= Goodloe =

Goodloe is the name of:

== Given name ==
- Goodloe Harper Bell (1832–1899), American teacher
- Goodloe Byron (1929–1978), American politician
- Goodloe Sutton (1939–2023), American newspaper editor, publisher, and owner

== Surname ==
- Abbe Carter Goodloe (1867–1960), American author
- Amy Goodloe (born 1967–68), American activist
- Don S.S. Goodloe (1878–1959), American teacher
- Hart Goodloe (1875–1954), American surgeon
- J. Mills Goodloe (born 1966), American film producer, screenwriter, director, and actor
- John M. Goodloe (1858–1942), American politician
- Paul Goodloe (born 1968), American television meteorologist
- Robert Goodloe (1936–2024), American baritone
- William C. Goodloe (1919–1997), chief justice of the Washington Supreme Court

== See also ==
- Goodloe, Virginia, unincorporated community in Lee County
- Goodloetown, section of Lexington, Kentucky
