= South Lancaster Academy =

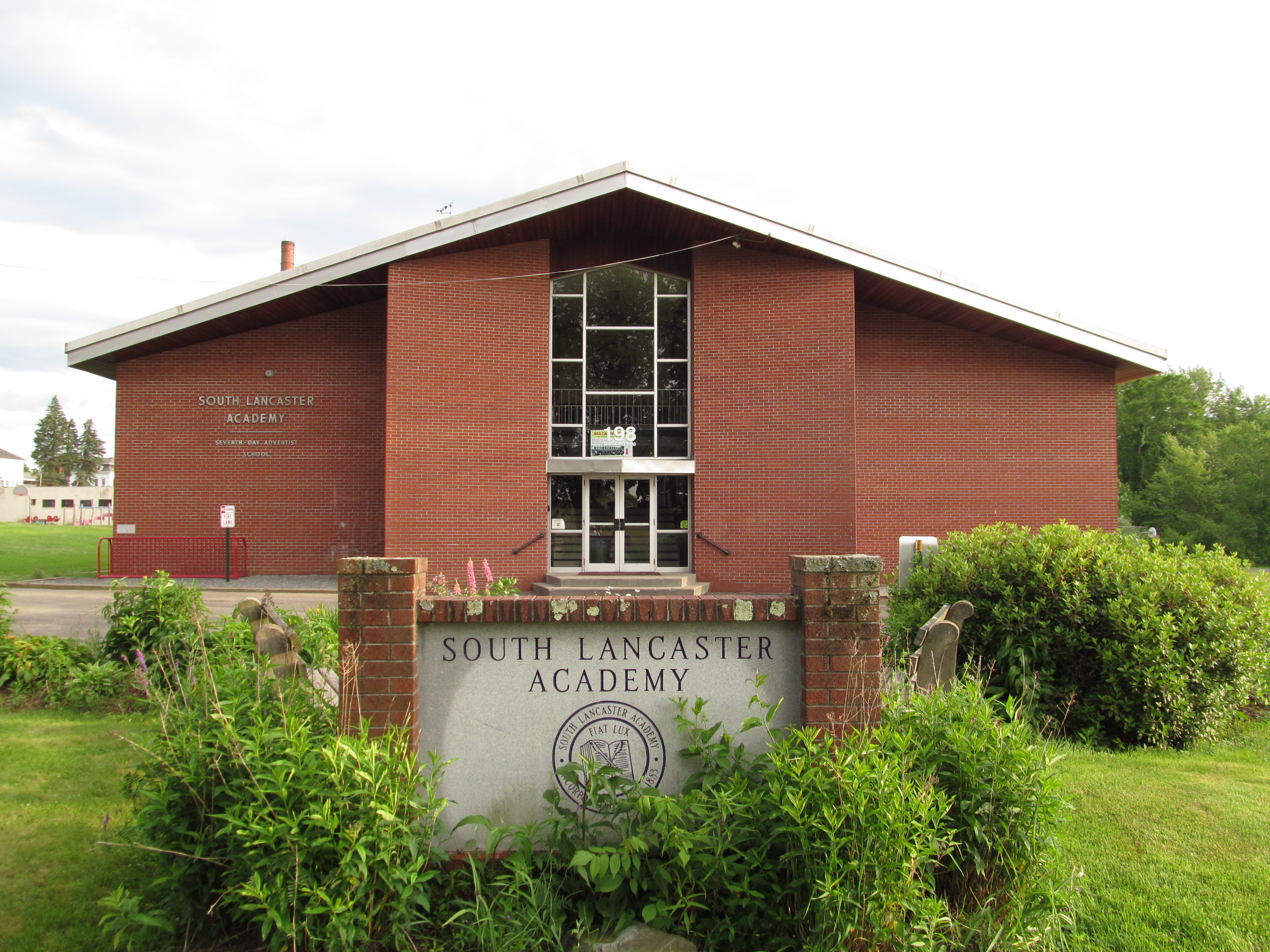

Location
- 198 George Hill Road; South Lancaster, MA 01523; United States; 42.444987°N 71.682873°W

Information
- Type: Private
- Motto: For God so loved the world that he gave His only son that whosoever believes in him shall not parish but have everlasting life
- Religious affiliation: Seventh-day Adventist Church
- Established: 1882
- Principal: Ollyce Gardner
- Faculty: 25
- Grades: Preschool - 12th
- Enrollment: 306
- Classes: 56
- Average class size: 20
- Student to teacher ratio: 12:1
- Campus size: 500 acres (2.0 km^{2})
- Color
- Athletics: Varsity Boys Basketball, Varsity Girls Basketball, Varsity Soccer, Varsity Girls Volleyball, Varsity Boys Volleyball, Co-Ed Cross Country
- Athletics conference: Southern New England
- Mascot: Crusaders
- Newspaper: The Pioneer
- Graduates (2019): 18
- Accreditation: Adventist Accrediting Association
- Website: www.mysla.org

South Lancaster Academy (SLA) is a co-educational preparatory day school, consisting of grades Preschool through 12, operated by Seventh-day Adventists in South Lancaster, Massachusetts. It is a part of the Seventh-day Adventist education system, the world's second largest Christian school system.

== History ==
On April 19, 1882, the "New England School", yet unnamed, opened its doors. Nineteen students started classes and five more joined these a few days later. Stephen Nelson Haskell (1833-1922) was the founder and builder of the school; Goodloe Harper Bell (1832-1899) was the first principal. The following year in 1883, the school was named South Lancaster Academy.

In 1885, the school expanded to include college preparatory. Teacher training was added in 1886, with development of a "normal school", the J. T. Browning Missionary and Industrial School.

In 1918, its standing as a junior college was formally recognized and the school name was changed to Lancaster Junior College.

In 1922 degree-granting powers were conferred by the Massachusetts legislature. Once more the school's name was changed to Atlantic Union College with the school beginning to operate on the senior college level, offering a four-year theological course. During the same period the college became a separate institute with the academy having its own board of trustees and faculty.

Since 1967, South Lancaster Academy has been a twelve-grade school. The academy attempts to maintain the historic ideals of Seventh-day Adventists on matters of morals, dress, and conduct, as its reasons for existence. South Lancaster Academy is operated by the SDA churches of Atlantic Union College, Leominster, South Lancaster Village, and Sterling. South Lancaster Academy is operated by the Southern New England Conference of Seventh-day Adventists and the Atlantic Union Conference of Seventh-day Adventists.

- 1882 Organized as a preparatory school on Feb 5th, under the leadership of Stephen Nelson Haskell (1833-1922)
- 1882 On April 19, first day of class for "that New England school"
- 1883 On Dec 12th, incorporated and formerly named as South Lancaster Academy
- 1887 In May, certificates were given to thirteen students who had completed the intermediate course of eight grades.
- 1888 On May 12, first SLA graduation ceremony was held.
- 1912 On Oct 27th the cornerstone was laid for the new Normal School.
- 1913 Browning Normal school dedicated
- 1918 Renamed Lancaster Junior College, after advanced work was carried on for several years in theology, teacher training, and business.
- 1922 Renamed Atlantic Union College, after offering a four-year theological course and being authorized degree-granting powers conferred by the Massachusetts legislature. The Academy and College became separate institutions with the Academy having its own board of trustees and faculty.
- 1965 With the opening of Pioneer Valley Academy, SLA was no longer used as a boarding school.
- 1965 Browning Elementary is re-situated at its current location on George Hill Road.
- 1967 South Lancaster Academy re-situated at its current location on George Hill Road in South Lancaster, MA.
- 1985 Administrations of Browning Elementary and South Lancaster Academy are combined into one.
- 2009 South Lancaster Academy/Browning Elementary is officially renamed to South Lancaster Academy with Browning Elementary being included as part of the school brand but not in title.

== See also ==
- List of Seventh-day Adventist secondary schools
- Seventh-day Adventist education
