= List of Phi Alpha Theta chapters =

Phi Alpha Theta is a North American honor society for history. It was founded in 1921 at the University of Arkansas. Following is a list of Phi Alpha Theta chapters, with active chapters indicted in bold and inactive chapers and institutions in italics.

Chapter	Charter date and range	Institution	Location	Status	Ref.
**Alpha**	March 14, 1921	University of Arkansas	Fayetteville, Arkansas	Active	
**Beta**	March 14, 1922	University of Pittsburgh	Pittsburgh, Pennsylvania	Active	
**Gamma**	1923	University of Pennsylvania	Philadelphia, Pennsylvania	Active	
**Delta**	1926	Florida State University	Tallahassee, Florida	Active	
**Epsilon**	1927	University of Illinois Urbana-Champaign	Urbana, Illinois	Active	
**Zeta**	1927	Ohio State University	Columbus, Ohio	Active	
**Eta**	1927	Southern Methodist University	Dallas, Texas	Active	
**Theta**	1928	Denison University	Granville, Ohio	Active	
**Iota**	1929	University of Northern Colorado	Greeley, Colorado	Active	
**Kappa**	1929	Muhlenberg College	Allentown, Pennsylvania	Active	
**Lambda**	1930	Pittsburg State University	Pittsburg, Kansas	Active	
**Mu**	1932	University of Central Arkansas	Conway, Arkansas	Active	
**Nu**	1932	Oklahoma State University	Stillwater, Oklahoma	Active	
**Xi**	1932	University of Southern California	Los Angeles, California	Active	
Omicron	1934	University of Nebraska Omaha	Omaha, Nebraska	Inactive	
**Pi**	1934	Northwestern State University	Natchitoches, Louisiana	Active	
**Rho**	1934	Southeastern Oklahoma State University	Durant, Oklahoma	Active	
Sigma	1936	University of New Mexico	Albuquerque, New Mexico	Inactive	
**Tau**	1937	University of Kentucky	Lexington, Kentucky	Active	
**Upsilon**	1937	Waynesburg University	Waynesburg, Pennsylvania	Active	
Phi	1937	University of Minnesota	Minneapolis, Minnesota	Inactive	
**Chi**	1938	University of California, Berkeley	Berkeley, California	Active	
**Psi**	1938	Kent State University	Kent, Ohio	Active	
**Omega**	1939	Gettysburg College	Gettysburg, Pennsylvania	Active	
**Alpha-Alpha**	1940	Lehigh University	Bethlehem, Pennsylvania	Active	
**Alpha-Beta**	1941	College of Wooster	Wooster, Ohio	Active	
Alpha-Gamma	1941	Bucknell University	Lewisburg, Pennsylvania	Inactive	
**Alpha-Delta**	1941	Marquette University	Milwaukee, Wisconsin	Active	
**Alpha-Epsilon**	1942	Southeast Missouri State University	Cape Girardeau, Missouri	Active	
**Alpha-Zeta**	1942	Stetson University	DeLand, Florida	Active	
Alpha-Eta	1943	Upsala College	East Orange, New Jersey	Inactive	(Note: The college closed in 1995.)
**Alpha-Theta**	1944	Hofstra University	Hempstead, New York	Active	
Alpha-Iota	1945	University of Nevada, Reno	Reno, Nevada	Inactive	
**Alpha-Kappa**	1945	University of Toledo	Toledo, Ohio	Active	
**Alpha-Lambda**	1945	University of North Texas	Denton, Texas	Active	
**Alpha-Mu**	1946	City College of New York	New York City, New York	Active	
**Alpha-Nu**	1946	Henderson State University	Arkadelphia, Arkansas	Active	
**Alpha-Xi**	1946	Westminster College	New Wilmington, Pennsylvania	Active	
**Alpha-Omicron**	1946	University of Kansas	Lawrence, Kansas	Active	
**Alpha-Pi**	1946	Augustana College	Rock Island, Illinois	Active	
**Alpha-Rho**	1946	University of Utah	Salt Lake City, Utah	Active	
**Alpha-Sigma**	1947	Washington & Jefferson College	Washington, Pennsylvania	Active	
**Alpha-Tau**	1947	Winthrop University	Rock Hill, South Carolina	Active	
**Alpha-Upsilon**	1947	Temple University	Philadelphia, Pennsylvania	Active	
**Alpha-Phi**	1947	Michigan State University	East Lansing, Michigan	Active	
**Alpha-Chi**	1947	Cedar Crest College	Allentown, Pennsylvania	Active	
**Alpha-Psi**	1947	Muskingum University	New Concord, Ohio	Active	
**Alpha-Omega**	1947	University of Rhode Island	Kingston, Rhode Island	Active	
**Beta-Alpha**	1947	University of Texas at Austin	Austin, Texas	Active	
Beta-Beta	1947	Stanford University	Palo Alto, California	Inactive	
Beta-Gamma	1947	William Jewell College	Liberty, Missouri	Inactive	
Beta-Delta	1948	University of Puerto Rico at Mayagüez	Mayagüez, Puerto Rico	Inactive	
**Beta-Epsilon**	1948	University of Colorado Boulder	Boulder, Colorado	Active	
**Beta-Zeta**	1948	Otterbein University	Westerville, Ohio	Active	
Beta-Eta	1948	Columbia University	New York City, New York	Inactive	
**Beta-Theta**	1948	Franklin & Marshall College	Lancaster, Pennsylvania	Active	
**Beta-Iota**	1948	Brigham Young University	Provo, Utah	Active	
**Beta-Kappa**	1948	San Diego State University	San Diego, California	Active	
**Beta-Lambda**	1948	San Jose State University	San Jose, California	Active	
**Beta-Mu**	1948	University of Richmond	Richmond, Virginia	Active	
Beta-Nu	1948	Davis & Elkins College	Elkins, West Virginia	Inactive	
**Beta-Xi**	1948	Lafayette College	Easton, Pennsylvania	Active	
**Beta-Omicron**	1948	University of Alabama	Tuscaloosa, Alabama	Active	
**Beta-Pi**	1948	Georgetown University	Washington, D.C.	Active	
**Beta-Rho**	1948	Carroll University	Waukesha, Wisconsin	Active	
**Beta-Sigma**	1948	Franklin College	Franklin, Indiana	Active	
**Beta-Tau**	1948	Queens College, City University of New York	New York City, New York	Active	
**Beta-Upsilon**	1948	University of North Dakota	Grand Forks, North Dakota	Active	
Beta-Phi	1948	Monmouth College	Monmouth, Illinois	Inactive	
**Beta-Chi**	1948	Drury University	Springfield, Missouri	Active	
**Beta-Psi**	1948	University of Montana	Missoula, Montana	Active	
**Beta-Omega**	1948	University of Maryland, College Park	College Park, Maryland	Active	
**Gamma-Alpha**	1948	Rutgers University–New Brunswick	New Brunswick, New Jersey	Active	
**Gamma-Beta**	1949	Bradley University	Peoria, Illinois	Active	
**Gamma-Gamma**	1949	Mississippi University for Women	Columbus, Mississippi	Active	
**Gamma-Delta**	1949	University of North Carolina at Greensboro	Greensboro, North Carolina	Active	
**Gamma-Epsilon**	1949	University of Texas at El Paso	El Paso, Texas	Active	
**Gamma-Zeta**	1949	Wittenberg University	Springfield, Ohio	Active	
**Gamma-Eta**	1949	University of Florida	Gainesville, Florida	Active	
Gamma-Theta	1949	University of Minnesota Duluth	Duluth, Minnesota	Inactive	
**Gamma-Iota**	1949	University of California, Santa Barbara	Santa Barbara, California	Active	
Gamma-Kappa	1949	Tulane University	New Orleans, Louisiana	Inactive	
**Gamma-Lambda**	1950	University of St. Thomas (Minnesota)	Saint Paul, Minnesota	Active	
**Gamma-Mu**	1950	Marietta College	Marietta, Ohio	Active	
**Gamma-Nu**	1950	Mississippi State University	Mississippi State, Mississippi	Active	
Gamma-Xi	1950	Utica University	Utica, New York	Inactive	
**Gamma-Omicron**	1950	Hope College	Holland, Michigan	Active	
**Gamma-Pi**	1950	University of Cincinnati	Cincinnati, Ohio	Active	
**Gamma-Rho**	1950	Wichita State University	Wichita, Kansas	Active	
**Gamma-Sigma**	1950	Georgetown College	Georgetown, Kentucky	Active	
**Gamma-Tau**	1950	Westminster College	Fulton, Missouri	Active	
**Gamma-Upsilon**	1950	Bowling Green State University	Bowling Green, Ohio	Active	
Gamma-Phi	1950	Interamerican University of Puerto Rico	San Germán, Puerto Rico	Inactive	
**Gamma-Chi**	1950	Marshall University	Huntington, West Virginia	Active	
**Gamma-Psi**	1950	Washington State University	Pullman, Washington	Active	
**Gamma-Omega**	1950	Texas A&M University–Kingsville	Kingsville, Texas	Active	
**Delta-Alpha**	1951	University of Miami	Coral Gables, Florida	Active	
Delta-Beta	1951	Occidental College	Los Angeles, California	Inactive	
Delta-Gamma	1951	Heidelberg University	Tiffin, Ohio	Inactive	
**Delta-Delta**	1951	Doane University	Crete, Nebraska	Active	
Delta-Epsilon	1951	Indiana University Bloomington	Bloomington, Indiana	Inactive	
**Delta-Zeta**	1951	University of the Ozarks	Clarksville, Arkansas	Active	
**Delta-Eta**	1951	University of Dayton	Dayton, Ohio	Active	
**Delta-Theta**	1951	Manhattan University	New York City, New York	Active	
**Delta-Iota**	1951	University of Washington	Seattle, Washington	Active	
**Delta-Kappa**	1952	University of Tulsa	Tulsa, Oklahoma	Active	
**Delta-Lambda**	1952	Salem College	Winston-Salem, North Carolina	Active	
**Delta-Mu**	1952	Boston University	Boston, Massachusetts	Active	
**Delta-Nu**	1952	West Virginia University	Morgantown, West Virginia	Active	
**Delta-Xi**	1952	Utah State University	Logan, Utah	Active	
**Delta-Omicron**	1952	University of Connecticut	Storrs, Connecticut	Active	
**Delta-Pi**	1952	University of North Carolina at Chapel Hill	Chapel Hill, North Carolina	Active	
Delta-Rho	1953	University of Iowa	Iowa City, Iowa	Inactive	
**Delta-Sigma**	1953	Kansas State University	Manhattan, Kansas	Active	
Delta-Tau	1953	University of Dubuque	Dubuque, Iowa	Inactive	
**Delta-Upsilon**	1953	Baldwin Wallace University	Berea, Ohio	Active	
**Delta-Phi**	1953	University of Wisconsin–Madison	Madison, Wisconsin	Active	
**Delta-Chi**	1953	University of Akron	Akron, Ohio	Active	
**Delta-Psi**	1953	Union University	Jackson, Tennessee	Active	
Delta-Omega	1953	Mount Mary University	Milwaukee, Wisconsin	Inactive	
**Epsilon-Alpha**	1953	North Carolina Central University	Durham, North Carolina	Active	
**Epsilon-Beta**	1954	Ohio University	Athens, Ohio	Active	
Epsilon-Gamma	1954	Wilmington College	Wilmington, Ohio	Inactive	
Epsilon-Delta	1954	Judson College	Marion, Alabama	Inactive	(Note: The college closed in 2024.)
Epsilon-Epsilon	1954	Central State University	Wilberforce, Ohio	Inactive	
**Epsilon-Zeta**	1954	Ohio Wesleyan University	Delaware, Ohio	Active	
**Epsilon-Eta**	1954	McPherson College	McPherson, Kansas	Active	
**Epsilon-Theta**	1954	Hunter College	New York City, New York	Active	
**Epsilon-Iota**	1954	Wagner College	Staten Island, New York	Active	
**Epsilon-Kappa**	1954	Oregon State University	Corvallis, Oregon	Active	
**Epsilon-Lambda**	1955	The Citadel	Charleston, South Carolina	Active	
**Epsilon-Mu**	1955	Eastern Illinois University	Charleston, Illinois	Active	
**Epsilon-Nu**	1955	University of Memphis	Memphis, Tennessee	Active	
**Epsilon-Xi**	1955	University of Louisiana at Lafayette	Lafayette, Louisiana	Active	(Note: Chapter formed at the University of Southwestern Louisiana, now the University of Louisiana at Lafayette.)
Epsilon-Omicron	1955	Pontifical Catholic University of Puerto Rico	Ponce, Puerto Rico	Inactive	
**Epsilon-Pi**	1956	University of Georgia	Athens, Georgia	Active	
**Epsilon-Rho**	1956	Samford University	Homewood, Alabama	Active	
**Epsilon-Sigma**	1956	Wake Forest University	Winston-Salem, North Carolina	Active	
**Epsilon-Tau**	1956	University of Louisiana at Monroe	Monroe, Louisiana	Active	(Note: Chapter formed at Northeast Louisiana State College, now the University of Louisiana at Monroe.)
**Epsilon-Upsilon**	1956	Pennsylvania State University	University Park, Pennsylvania	Active	
**Epsilon-Phi**	1956	Duquesne University	Pittsburgh, Pennsylvania	Active	
Epsilon-Chi	1956	Lipscomb University	Nashville, Tennessee	Inactive	
**Epsilon-Psi**	1956	American University	Washington, D.C.	Active	
Epsilon-Omega	1956	LIU Brooklyn	Brooklyn, New York	Inactive	
Zeta-Alpha	1956	Immaculate Heart College	Los Angeles, California	Inactive	(Note: The college closed in 1981.)
**Zeta-Beta**	1956	Abilene Christian University	Abilene, Texas	Active	
**Zeta-Gamma**	1956	Howard University	Washington, D.C.	Active	
**Zeta-Delta**	1956	Adelphi University	Garden City, New York	Active	
**Zeta-Epsilon**	1956	Thiel College	Greenville, Pennsylvania	Active	
**Zeta-Zeta**	1956	Lycoming College	Williamsport, Pennsylvania	Active	
Zeta-Eta	1956	Louisiana State University	Baton Rouge, Louisiana	Inactive	
**Zeta-Theta**	1957	University of Oklahoma	Norman, Oklahoma	Active	
**Zeta-Iota**	1957	Texas Tech University	Lubbock, Texas	Active	
Zeta-Kappa	1957	University of Houston	Houston, Texas	Inactive	
Zeta-Lambda	1957	Loras College	Dubuque, Iowa	Inactive	
**Zeta-Mu**	1957	University of South Dakota	Vermillion, South Dakota	Active	
Zeta-Nu	1957	University of Nebraska–Lincoln	Lincoln, Nebraska	Inactive	
**Zeta-Xi**	1958	Albion College	Albion, Michigan	Active	
Zeta-Omicron	1958	Park University	Parkville, Missouri	Inactive	
Zeta-Pi	1958	Eastern New Mexico University	Portales, New Mexico	Inactive	
Zeta-Rho	1958	University of the Philippines Diliman	Quezon City, Metro Manila, Philippines	Inactive	
**Zeta-Sigma**	1958	University of Detroit Mercy	Detroit, Michigan	Active	
Zeta-Tau	1958	Northeastern University	Boston, Massachusetts	Inactive	
**Zeta-Upsilon**	1958	West Texas A&M University	Canyon, Texas	Active	
**Zeta-Phi**	1958	University of North Georgia	Dahlonega, Georgia	Active	
**Zeta-Chi**	1958	Augustana University	Sioux Falls, South Dakota	Active	
**Zeta-Psi**	1958	Wayland Baptist University	Plainview, Texas	Active	
**Zeta-Omega**	1958	University of Arizona	Tucson, Arizona	Active	
Eta-Alpha	1959	John Carroll University	University Heights, Ohio	Inactive	
**Eta-Beta**	1959	East Texas A&M University	Commerce, Texas	Active	
**Eta-Gamma**	1959	West Virginia State University	Institute, West Virginia	Active	
**Eta-Delta**	1959	Peru State College	Peru, Nebraska	Active	
Eta-Epsilon	1959	Greenville University	Greenville, Illinois	Inactive	
Eta-Zeta	1959	Pepperdine University, Vermont Avenue Campus	Vermont Knolls, Los Angeles, California	Inactive	(Note: Pepperdine sold its Vermont Avenue Campus in 1981.)
**Eta-Eta**	1959	Northern Illinois University	DeKalb, Illinois	Active	
**Eta-Theta**	1959	Emmanuel College	Boston, Massachusetts	Active	
**Eta-Iota**	1959	Salisbury University	Salisbury, Maryland	Active	
**Eta-Kappa**	1959	Texas Christian University	Fort Worth, Texas	Active	
**Eta-Lambda**	1959	Case Western Reserve University	Cleveland, Ohio	Active	
Eta-Mu	1960	Texas Lutheran University	Seguin, Texas	Inactive	
**Eta-Nu**	1960	Texas Woman's University	Denton, Texas	Active	
**Eta-Xi**	1960	California State University, Los Angeles	Los Angeles, California	Active	
**Eta-Omicron**	1960	University of Mary Hardin–Baylor	Belton, Texas	Active	
**Eta-Pi**	1960	Western Kentucky University	Bowling Green, Kentucky	Active	
Eta-Rho	1960	Lewis & Clark College	Portland, Oregon	Inactive	
**Eta-Sigma**	1960	Stephen F. Austin State University	Nacogdoches, Texas	Active	
**Eta-Tau**	1960	East Stroudsburg University	East Stroudsburg, Pennsylvania	Active	
Eta-Upsilon	1960	University of Denver	Denver, Colorado	Inactive	
**Eta-Phi**	1960	Harding University	Searcy, Arkansas	Active	
**Eta-Chi**	1960	Arkansas State University	Jonesboro, Arkansas	Active	
**Eta-Psi**	1960	Fort Hays State University	Hays, Kansas	Active	
**Eta-Omega**	1960	Morgan State University	Baltimore, Maryland	Active	
**Theta-Alpha**	1960	Boston College	Boston, Massachusetts	Active	
**Theta-Beta**	1961	Towson University	Towson, Maryland	Active	
**Theta-Gamma**	1961	University of Tampa	Tampa, Florida	Active	
**Theta-Delta**	1961	Austin Peay State University	Clarksville, Tennessee	Active	
**Theta-Epsilon**	1961	Carson–Newman University	Jefferson City, Tennessee	Active	
**Theta-Zeta**	1961	Mississippi College	Clinton, Mississippi	Active	
Theta-Eta	1961	Creighton University	Omaha, Nebraska	Inactive	
**Theta-Theta**	1961	College of William & Mary	Williamsburg, Virginia	Active	
**Theta-Iota**	1961	University of Montevallo	Montevallo, Alabama	Active	
**Theta-Kappa**	1962	University of Southern Mississippi	Hattiesburg, Mississippi	Active	
**Theta-Kappa**	1962	University of Southern Mississippi Gulf Park	Biloxi, Mississippi	Active	
**Theta-Lambda**	1962	Suffolk University	Boston, Massachusetts	Active	
**Theta-Mu**	1962	Missouri State University	Springfield, Missouri	Active	(Note: Chapter formed at Southwest Missouri State College, now Missouri State University.)
**Theta-Nu**	1962	St. Francis College	Brooklyn, New York	Active	
Theta-Xi	1962	Old Dominion University	Norfolk, Virginia	Inactive	
**Theta-Omicron**	1962	Catholic University of America	Washington, D.C.	Active	
**Theta-Pi**	1962	California State University, Fullerton	Fullerton, California	Active	
**Theta-Rho**	1962	Aquinas College	Grand Rapids, Michigan	Active	
**Theta-Sigma**	1962	Southern Arkansas University	Magnolia, Arkansas	Active	
**Theta-Tau**	1962	California State University, Northridge	Northridge, Los Angeles, California	Active	
**Theta-Upsilon**	1962	University of California, Los Angeles	Los Angeles, California	Active	
Theta-Phi	1962	Newton College of the Sacred Heart	Newton Centre, Massachusetts	Inactive	(Note: The college merged into Boston College in 1974.)
**Theta-Chi**	1962	Colorado State University	Fort Collins, Colorado	Active	
**Theta-Psi**	1963	Mount St. Mary's University	Emmitsburg, Maryland	Active	
**Theta-Omega**	1963	Moravian University	Bethlehem, Pennsylvania	Active	
**Iota-Alpha**	1963	Miami University	Oxford, Ohio	Active	
**Iota-Beta**	1963	Guilford College	Greensboro, North Carolina	Active	
**Iota-Gamma**	1963	Arizona State University	Tempe, Arizona	Active	
**Iota-Delta**	1963	University of Wisconsin–Stevens Point	Stevens Point, Wisconsin	Active	
**Iota-Epsilon**	1963	Rider University	Lawrence Township, New Jersey	Active	
**Iota-Zeta**	1963	University of Arkansas at Little Rock	Little Rock, Arkansas	Active	
Iota-Eta	1964	West Virginia University Institute of Technology	Beckley, West Virginia	Inactive	
**Iota-Theta**	1964	Arcadia University	Glenside, Pennsylvania	Active	(Note: Chapter formed at Beaver College, now Arcadia University.)
**Iota-Iota**	1964	Frostburg State University	Frostburg, Maryland	Active	
**Iota-Kappa**	1964	Rutgers University–Newark	Newark, New Jersey	Active	
**Iota-Lambda**	1964	Canisius University	Buffalo, New York	Active	
**Iota-Mu**	1964	Troy University	Troy, Alabama	Active	
**Iota-Nu**	1964	Western Colorado University	Gunnison, Colorado	Active	
**Iota-Xi**	1964	Belhaven University	Jackson, Mississippi	Active	
**Iota-Omicron**	1964	Monmouth University	West Long Branch, New Jersey	Active	
**Iota-Pi**	1964	Fort Lewis College	Durango, Colorado	Active	
Iota-Rho	1964	Mount Saint Mary's University	Los Angeles, California	Inactive	
**Iota-Sigma**	1965	Marywood University	Scranton, Pennsylvania	Active	
**Iota-Tau**	1965	Dominican University	River Forest, Illinois	Active	(Note: Chapter formed at Rosary College, now Dominican University.)
Iota-Upsilon	1965	Colgate University	Hamilton, New York	Inactive	
**Iota-Phi**	1965	University of Pikeville	Pikeville, Kentucky	Active	
Iota-Chi	1965	Ripon College	Ripon, Wisconsin	Inactive	
Iota-Psi	1965	Bloomfield College	Bloomfield, New Jersey	Inactive	
Iota-Omega	1965	Centre College	Danville, Kentucky	Inactive	
**Kappa-Alpha**	1965	University of Mississippi	University, Mississippi	Active	
**Kappa-Beta**	1965	Albright College	Reading, Pennsylvania	Active	
Kappa-Gamma	1965	Whittier College	Whittier, California	Inactive	
Kappa-Delta	1965	University of Bridgeport	Bridgeport, Connecticut	Inactive	
Kappa-Epsilon	1965	Washington Adventist University	Takoma Park, Maryland	Inactive	(Note: Chapter formed at Columbia Union College, now Washington Adventist University.)
Kappa-Zeta	1965	St. Mary's University, Texas	San Antonio, Texas	Inactive	
**Kappa-Eta**	1965	University of Wisconsin–Oshkosh	Oshkosh, Wisconsin	Active	
Kappa-Theta	1965	Northern Arizona University	Flagstaff, Arizona	Inactive	
**Kappa-Iota**	1965	Iowa State University	Ames, Iowa	Active	
**Kappa-Kappa**	1965	Texas Southern University	Houston, Texas	Active	
**Kappa-Lambda**	1965	University of Central Missouri	Warrensburg, Missouri	Active	
Kappa-Mu	1965	United States International University	San Diego, California	Inactive	(Note: The university closed in 2001.)
Kappa-Nu	1965	Xavier University	Cincinnati, Ohio	Inactive	
**Kappa-Xi**	1965	Mary Baldwin University	Staunton, Virginia	Active	
**Kappa-Omicron**	1965	Westfield State University	Westfield, Massachusetts	Active	
**Kappa-Pi**	1965	Auburn University	Auburn, Alabama	Active	
**Kappa-Rho**	1965	University of Dallas	Irving, Texas	Active	
Kappa-Sigma	1965	St. Joseph's College	Emmitsburg, Maryland	Inactive	(Note: College closed in 1973)
**Kappa-Tau**	1965	Tennessee Technological University	Cookeville, Tennessee	Active	
**Kappa-Upsilon**	1965	Roosevelt University	Chicago, Illinois	Active	
**Kappa-Phi**	1965	San Francisco State University	San Francisco, California	Active	
**Kappa-Chi**	1966	Buena Vista University	Storm Lake, Iowa	Active	
**Kappa-Psi**	1966	Rhode Island College	Providence, Rhode Island	Active	
**Kappa-Omega**	1966	College of the Holy Cross	Worcester, Massachusetts	Active	
Lambda-Alpha	1966	University of Alberta	Edmonton, Alberta, Canada	Inactive	
**Lambda-Beta**	1966	Minnesota State University, Mankato	Mankato, Minnesota	Active	
**Lambda-Gamma**	1966	Syracuse University	Syracuse, New York	Active	
Lambda-Delta	1966	Tarkio College	Tarkio, Missouri	Inactive	(Note: The college closed in 1992.)
**Lambda-Epsilon**	1966	Seton Hall University	South Orange, New Jersey	Active	
**Lambda-Zeta**	1966	Merrimack College	North Andover, Massachusetts	Active	
**Lambda-Eta**	1966	East Carolina University	Greenville, North Carolina	Active	
**Lambda-Theta**	1966	Sul Ross State University	Alpine, Texas	Active	
**Lambda-Iota**	1966	Macalester College	Saint Paul, Minnesota	Active	
**Lambda-Kappa**	1966	Susquehanna University	Selinsgrove, Pennsylvania	Active	
**Lambda-Lambda**	1966	Saint Mary's University of Minnesota	Winona, Minnesota	Active	
Lambda-Mu	1966	Heritage University	Toppenish, Washington	Inactive	(Note: Chapter formed at Fort Wright College, now Heritage University.)
**Lambda-Nu**	1966	University of Wisconsin–River Falls	River Falls, Wisconsin	Active	
**Lambda-Xi**	1966	University of Wisconsin–Madison	Madison, Wisconsin	Active	
**Lambda-Omicron**	1966	University of Wisconsin–Eau Claire	Eau Claire, Wisconsin	Active	
**Lambda-Pi**	1966	University of Tennessee at Chattanooga	Chattanooga, Tennessee	Active	
**Lambda-Rho**	1966	Louisiana Tech University	Ruston, Louisiana	Active	
**Lambda-Sigma**	1966	Thomas More University	Crestview Hills, Kentucky	Active	
Lambda-Tau	1966	Eastern University	St. Davids, Pennsylvania	Inactive	
**Lambda-Upsilon**	1966	Santa Clara University	Santa Clara, California	Active	
Lambda-Phi	1966	Chaminade University of Honolulu	Honolulu, Hawaii	Inactive	
**Lambda-Chi**	1966	Spring Hill College	Mobile, Alabama	Active	
**Lambda-Psi**	1966	Alma College	Alma, Michigan	Active	
**Lambda-Omega**	1966	Luther College	Decorah, Iowa	Active	
**Mu-Alpha**	1966	Saint Louis University	St. Louis, Missouri	Active	
Mu-Beta	1967	Ball State University	Muncie, Indiana	Inactive	
**Mu-Gamma**	1967	Graceland University	Lamoni, Iowa	Active	
**Mu-Delta**	1967	King's College	Wilkes-Barre, Pennsylvania	Active	
**Mu-Epsilon**	1967	Bethany College	Bethany, West Virginia	Active	
**Mu-Zeta**	1967	Marist University	Poughkeepsie, New York	Active	
**Mu-Eta**	1967	Lewis University	Romeoville, Illinois	Active	
**Mu-Theta**	1967	Jacksonville University	Jacksonville, Florida	Active	
**Mu-Iota**	1967	University of Massachusetts Boston	Boston, Massachusetts	Active	(Note: College merged into the University of Massachusetts Boston in 1982.)
Mu-Kappa	1967	Dana College	Blair, Nebraska	Inactive	(Note: The college closed in 2010.)
**Mu-Lambda**	1967	Northwestern Oklahoma State University	Alva, Oklahoma	Active	
Mu-Mu	1967	University of Olivet	Olivet, Michigan	Inactive	
Mu-Nu	1967	Lincoln Memorial University	Harrogate, Tennessee	Inactive	
**Mu-Xi**	1967	Kutztown University	Kutztown, Pennsylvania	Active	
Mu-Omicron	1967	Ottawa University	Ottawa, Kansas	Inactive	
**Mu-Pi**	1967	Stony Brook University	Stony Brook, New York	Active	
**Mu-Rho**	1967	University of Scranton	Scranton, Pennsylvania	Active	
**Mu-Sigma**	1967	Norwich University	Northfield, Vermont	Active	
Mu-Tau	1967	Georgia State University	Atlanta, Georgia	Inactive	
**Mu-Upsilon**	1967	Illinois State University	Normal, Illinois	Active	
**Mu-Phi**	1967	Western Washington University	Bellingham, Washington	Active	
**Mu-Chi**	1967	Lamar University	Beaumont, Texas	Active	
**Mu-Psi**	1967	Commonwealth University-Bloomsburg	Bloomsburg, Pennsylvania	Active	(Note: Chapter formed at Bloomsburg State College, now Commonwealth University-Bloomsburg.)
**Mu-Omega**	1967	Saint Joseph's University	Philadelphia, Pennsylvania	Active	
**Nu-Alpha**	1967	University of Wyoming	Laramie, Wyoming	Active	
**Nu-Beta**	1967	University of Wisconsin–Whitewater	Whitewater, Wisconsin	Active	
**Nu-Gamma**	1967	Illinois Wesleyan University	Bloomington, Illinois	Active	
**Nu-Delta**	1967	Transylvania University	Lexington, Kentucky	Active	
**Nu-Epsilon**	1967	University of Mount Saint Vincent	New York City, New York	Active	
**Nu-Eta**	1967	Pace University	New York City, New York	Active	
**Nu-Eta**	1967	Pace University Pleasantville	Pleasantville, New York	Active	
**Nu-Zeta**	1967	Olivet Nazarene University	Bourbonnais, Illinois	Active	
Nu-Theta	1968	Pace University		Consolidated ?	
Nu-Iota	1968	Saint Mary-of-the-Woods College	Saint Mary-of-the-Woods, Indiana	Inactive	
**Nu-Kappa**	1968	Ohio Northern University	Ada, Ohio	Active	
**Nu-Lambda**	1968	New York University	New York City, New York	Active	
Nu-Mu	1968	Kentucky Wesleyan College	Owensboro, Kentucky	Inactive	
**Nu-Nu**	1968	Bridgewater State University	Bridgewater, Massachusetts	Active	
**Nu-Xi**	1968	University of Louisville	Louisville, Kentucky	Active	
**Nu-Omicron**	1968	State University of New York at Cortland	Cortland, New York	Active	
**Nu-Pi**	1968	Notre Dame of Maryland University	Baltimore, Maryland	Active	
**Nu-Rho**	1968	Stonehill College	Easton, Massachusetts	Active	
**Nu-Sigma**	1968	West Chester University	West Chester, Pennsylvania	Active	
Nu-Tau	1968	University of Charleston	Charleston, West Virginia	Inactive	
**Nu-Upsilon**	1968	Saint Elizabeth University	Morris Township, New Jersey	Active	
**Nu-Phi**	1968	Washington College	Chestertown, Maryland	Active	
**Nu-Chi**	1968	Truman State University	Kirksville, Missouri	Active	(Note: Chapter formed at Northeast Missouri State College, now Truman State University.)
**Nu-Psi**	1968	La Salle University	Philadelphia, Pennsylvania	Active	
Nu-Omega	1968	Purdue University	West Lafayette, Indiana	Inactive	
**Xi-Alpha**	1968	Belmont College	St. Clairsville, Ohio	Active	
**Xi-Beta**	1968	Indiana University of Pennsylvania	Indiana, Pennsylvania	Active	
**Xi-Gamma**	1968	Gonzaga University	Spokane, Washington	Active	
**Xi-Delta**	1968	Brigham Young University–Hawaii	Lāʻie, Hawaii	Active	
**Xi-Epsilon**	1968	Lander College for Men	Kew Gardens Hills, Queens, New York City, New York	Active	
**Xi-Zeta**	1968	Angelo State University	San Angelo, Texas	Active	
Xi-Eta	1968	College of Saint Mary	Omaha, Nebraska	Inactive	
**Xi-Theta**	1968	Eastern Kentucky University	Richmond, Kentucky	Active	
**Xi-Iota**	1968	Carthage College	Kenosha, Wisconsin	Active	
**Xi-Kappa**	1968	Barry University	Miami Shores, Florida	Active	
**Xi-Lambda**	1968	Murray State University	Murray, Kentucky	Active	
**Xi-Mu**	1968	Quincy College	Quincy, Massachusetts	Active	
**Xi-Nu**	1968	Saint Vincent College	Latrobe, Pennsylvania	Active	
Xi-Xi	1968	Concordia University Chicago	River Forest, Illinois	Inactive	
**Xi-Omicron**	1968	Southwestern Oklahoma State University	Weatherford, Oklahoma	Active	
Xi-Pi	1968	Upper Iowa University	Fayette, Iowa	Inactive	
**Xi-Rho**	1969	University of West Georgia	Carrollton, Georgia	Active	
**Xi-Sigma**	1969	University of Findlay	Findlay, Ohio	Active	
**Xi-Tau**	1969	State University of New York at Fredonia	Fredonia, New York	Active	
**Xi-Upsilon**	1969	Fitchburg State University	Fitchburg, Massachusetts	Active	
**Xi-Phi**	1969	University of South Carolina	Columbia, South Carolina	Active	
**Xi-Chi**	1969	Ithaca College	Ithaca, New York	Active	
**Xi-Psi**	1969	Millsaps College	Jackson, Mississippi	Active	
**Xi-Omega**	1969	Florida Atlantic University	Boca Raton, Florida	Active	
Omicron-Alpha	1969	Alaska Pacific University	Anchorage, Alaska	Inactive	(Note: Chapter formed at Alaska Methodist University, now Alaska Pacific University.)
Omicron-Beta	1969	Indiana University South Bend	South Bend, Indiana	Inactive	
**Omicron-Gamma**	1969	Chadron State College	Chadron, Nebraska	Active	
**Omicron-Delta**	1969	Fairleigh Dickinson University Teaneck	Teaneck, New Jersey	Active	
**Omicron-Epsilon**	1969	Berry College	Mount Berry, Georgia	Active	
**Omicron-Zeta**	1969	Ashland University	Ashland, Ohio	Active	
Omicron-Eta	1969	Clarkson University	Potsdam, New York	Inactive	
Omicron-Theta	1969	Albany State University	Albany, Georgia	Inactive	
Omicron-Iota	1969	Notre Dame College	South Euclid, Ohio	Inactive	
**Omicron-Kappa**	1969	University of Texas at Arlington	Arlington, Texas	Active	
**Omicron-Lambda**	1969	Andrews University	Berrien Springs, Michigan	Active	
Omicron-Mu	1969	Northern Michigan University	Marquette, Michigan	Inactive	
**Omicron-Nu**	1969	University of St. Francis	Joliet, Illinois	Active	
**Omicron-Xi**	1969	Siena University	Loudonville, New York	Active	
**Omicron-Omicron**	1969	Western Illinois University	Macomb, Illinois	Active	
Omicron-Pi	1969	Elizabethtown College	Elizabethtown, Pennsylvania	Inactive	
**Omicron-Rho**	1969	State University of New York at Geneseo	Geneseo, New York	Active	
**Omicron-Sigma**	1969	Winona State University	Winona, Minnesota	Active	
Omicron-Tau	1969	Adrian College	Adrian, Michigan	Inactive	
**Omicron-Upsilon**	1969	Chicago State University	Chicago, Illinois	Active	
**Omicron-Phi**	1969	Appalachian State University	Boone, North Carolina	Active	
**Omicron-Chi**	1969	Nicholls State University	Thibodaux, Louisiana	Active	
**Omicron-Psi**	1969	California State University, Long Beach	Long Beach, California	Active	
Omicron-Omega	1969	Central Michigan University	Mount Pleasant, Michigan	Inactive	
**Pi-Alpha**	1969	Georgia Southern University	Statesboro, Georgia	Active	
**Pi-Beta**	1969	Loyola Marymount University	Los Angeles, California	Active	
**Pi-Gamma**	1970	Northeastern Illinois University	Chicago, Illinois	Active	
**Pi-Delta**	1970	Montana State University Billings	Billings, Montana	Active	(Note: Chapter formed at Eastern Montana College, now Montana State University Billings.)
**Pi-Epsilon**	1970	Shepherd University	Shepherdstown, West Virginia	Active	
**Pi-Zeta**	1970	Sonoma State University	Rohnert Park, California	Active	
**Pi-Eta**	1970	St. Lawrence University	Canton, New York	Active	
**Pi-Theta**	1970	University of Idaho	Moscow, Idaho	Active	
**Pi-Iota**	1970	Defiance College	Defiance, Ohio	Active	
**Pi-Kappa**	1970	PennWest California	California, Pennsylvania	Active	(Note: Chapter formed at California State College, now PennWest California.)
**Pi-Lambda**	1970	University of Northern Iowa	Cedar Falls, Iowa	Active	
**Pi-Mu**	1970	East Texas Baptist University	Marshall, Texas	Active	
**Pi-Nu**	1970	University of Nebraska at Kearney	Kearney, Nebraska	Active	
**Pi-Xi**	1970	Virginia Tech	Blacksburg, Virginia	Active	
Pi-Omicron	1970	Salem University	Salem, West Virginia	Inactive	
**Pi-Pi**	1970	Saint Peter's University	Jersey City, New Jersey	Active	
Pi-Rho	1970	Russell Sage College	Troy, New York	Inactive	
**Pi-Sigma**	1970	Middle Tennessee State University	Murfreesboro, Tennessee	Active	
Pi-Tau	1970	Butler University	Indianapolis, Indiana	Inactive	
**Pi-Upsilon**	1970	Lehman College	Bronx, New York	Active	
Pi-Phi	1970	University of Missouri–Kansas City	Kansas City, Missouri	Inactive	
**Pi-Chi**	1970	Loyola University New Orleans	New Orleans, Louisiana	Active	
Pi-Psi	1970	Western Carolina University	Cullowhee, North Carolina	Inactive	
**Pi-Omega**	1970	University of San Diego	San Diego, California	Active	
**Rho-Alpha**	1970	William Paterson University	Wayne, New Jersey	Active	
**Rho-Beta**	1970	University of North Alabama	Florence, Alabama	Active	
**Rho-Gamma**	1970	Northeastern State University	Tahlequah, Oklahoma	Active	
Rho-Delta	1970	Lambuth University	Jackson, Tennessee	Inactive	
Rho-Epsilon	1970	Morehouse College	Atlanta, Georgia	Inactive	
**Rho-Zeta**	1970	New Mexico State University	Las Cruces, New Mexico	Active	
Rho-Eta	1970	Morehead State University	Morehead, Kentucky	Inactive	
**Rho-Theta**	1970	University of South Alabama	Mobile, Alabama	Active	
**Rho-Iota**	1970	Slippery Rock University	Slippery Rock, Pennsylvania	Active	
**Rho-Kappa**	1970	Tennessee State University	Nashville, Tennessee	Active	
**Rho-Lambda**	1971	University of Central Oklahoma	Edmond, Oklahoma	Active	
**Rho-Mu**	1971	West Virginia Wesleyan College	Buckhannon, West Virginia	Active	
**Rho-Nu**	1971	University of South Florida	Tampa, Florida	Active	
**Rho-Xi**	1971	California State University, Sacramento	Sacramento, California	Active	
**Rho-Omicron**	1971	William Penn University	Oskaloosa, Iowa	Active	
**Rho-Pi**	1971	University of Portland	Portland, Oregon	Active	
**Rho-Rho**	1971	New Jersey City University	Jersey City, New Jersey	Active	
Rho-Sigma	1971	Wright State University	Fairborn, Ohio	Inactive	
**Rho-Tau**	1971	William Woods University	Fulton, Missouri	Active	
Rho-Upsilon	1971	Southern University at New Orleans	New Orleans, Louisiana	Inactive	
**Rho-Phi**	1971	Southeastern Louisiana University	Hammond, Louisiana	Active	
**Rho-Chi**	1971	Winston-Salem State University	Winston-Salem, North Carolina	Active	
**Rho-Psi**	1971	University of Notre Dame	Notre Dame, Indiana	Active	
Rho-Omega	1971	Southern Benedictine College	Cullman, Alabama	Inactive	(Note: Chapter formed at St. Bernard College, which merged with Cullman College to become Southern Benedictine in 1976. The college closed in 1979.)
**Sigma-Alpha**	1971	Southern Adventist University	Collegedale, Tennessee	Active	
**Sigma-Beta**	1971	McMurry University	Abilene, Texas	Active	
**Sigma-Gamma**	1971	St. Bonaventure University	St. Bonaventure, New York	Active	
Sigma-Delta	1971	College of Saint Teresa	Winona, Minnesota	Inactive	(Note: College closed in 1989.)
Sigma-Epsilon	1971	Elms College	Chicopee, Massachusetts	Inactive	
**Sigma-Zeta**	1971	Texas State University	San Marcos, Texas	Active	
**Sigma-Eta**	1971	Western Connecticut State University	Danbury, Connecticut	Active	
**Sigma-Theta**	1971	Georgia Southern University–Armstrong Campus	Savannah, Georgia	Active	(Note: Chapter formed at Armstrong State College, now Georgia Southern University–Armstrong Campus.)
**Sigma-Iota**	1971	University of West Florida	Pensacola, Florida	Active	
**Sigma-Kappa**	1971	Southern Illinois University Carbondale	Carbondale, Illinois	Active	
**Sigma-Lambda**	1971	Bowie State University	Bowie, Maryland	Active	
Sigma-Mu	1971	Mundelein College	Chicago, Illinois	Inactive	
Sigma-Nu	1971	Indiana University Southeast	New Albany, Indiana	Inactive	
**Sigma-Xi**	1971	St. John Fisher University	Pittsford, New York	Active	
Sigma-Omicron	1971	Oklahoma City University	Oklahoma City, Oklahoma	Inactive	
Sigma-Pi	1971	Millikin University	Decatur, Illinois	Inactive	
**Sigma-Rho**	1971	Texas A&M University	College Station, Texas	Active	
Sigma-Sigma	1971	Oglethorpe University	Brookhaven, Georgia	Inactive	
**Sigma-Tau**	1971	Delaware State University	Dover, Delaware	Active	
**Sigma-Upsilon**	1972	University of San Francisco	San Francisco, California	Active	
**Sigma-Phi**	1972	Sam Houston State University	Huntsville, Texas	Active	
Sigma-Chi	1972	Mount St. Joseph University	Delhi Township, Ohio	Inactive	
**Sigma-Psi**	1972	West Liberty University	West Liberty, West Virginia	Active	
**Sigma-Omega**	1972	Saint Anselm College	Goffstown, New Hampshire	Active	
Tau-Alpha	1972	Cleveland State University	Cleveland, Ohio	Inactive	
**Tau-Beta**	1972	Baylor University	Waco, Texas	Active	
**Tau-Gamma**	1972	Midwestern State University	Wichita Falls, Texas	Active	
Tau-Delta	1972	Delta State University	Cleveland, Mississippi	Inactive	
**Tau-Epsilon**	1972	California State University, Dominguez Hills	Carson, California	Active	
Tau-Zeta	1972	Lakeland College	Sheboygan, Wisconsin	Inactive	
**Tau-Eta**	1972	Brenau University	Gainesville, Georgia	Active	
Tau-Theta	1972	Jacksonville State University	Jacksonville, Alabama	Inactive	
**Tau-Iota**	1972	Central Washington University	Ellensburg, Washington	Active	
**Tau-Kappa**	1972	Radford University	Radford, Virginia	Active	
**Tau-Lambda**	1972	York College, City University of New York	Jamaica, Queens, New York City, New York	Active	
**Tau-Mu**	1972	University of Baltimore	Baltimore, Maryland	Active	
Tau-Nu	1972	PennWest Edinboro	Edinboro, Pennsylvania	Inactive	(Note: Chapter formed at Edinboro State College, now PennWest Edinboro.)
**Tau-Xi**	1972	Nebraska Wesleyan University	Lincoln, Nebraska	Active	
**Tau-Omicron**	1972	Gwynedd Mercy University	Lower Gwynedd Township, Pennsylvania	Active	
**Tau-Pi**	1972	James Madison University	Harrisonburg, Virginia	Active	
**Tau-Rho**	1972	University of Texas–Pan American	Edinburg, Texas	Active	
**Tau-Sigma**	1972	Oklahoma Christian University	Oklahoma City, Oklahoma	Active	
Tau-Tau	1973	New Mexico Highlands University	Las Vegas, New Mexico	Active	
Tau-Upsilon	1973	Teikyo Westmar University	Le Mars, Iowa	Inactive	(Note: Chapter formed at Westmar College, which merged to form Teikyo Westmar University in 1990. The university closed in 1997.)
**Tau-Phi**	1973	Villanova University	Villanova, Pennsylvania	Active	
**Tau-Chi**	1973	University of Colorado Colorado Springs	Colorado Springs, Colorado	Active	
**Tau-Psi**	1973	The College of New Jersey	Ewing Township, New Jersey	Active	(Note: Chapter formed at Trenton State College, now The College of New Jersey.)
**Tau-Omega**	1973	University of Alabama in Huntsville	Huntsville, Alabama	Active	
**Upsilon-Alpha**	1973	Framingham State University	Framingham, Massachusetts	Active	
**Upsilon-Beta**	1973	Loyola University Maryland	Baltimore, Maryland	Active	
**Upsilon-Gamma**	1973	University of St. Thomas	Houston, Texas	Active	
**Upsilon-Delta**	1973	University of Mary Washington	Fredericksburg, Virginia	Active	
Upsilon-Epsilon	1973	University of Arkansas at Pine Bluff	Pine Bluff, Arkansas	Inactive	
**Upsilon-Zeta**	1973	North Carolina A&T State University	Greensboro, North Carolina	Active	
Upsilon-Eta	1973	Bethany College	Lindsborg, Kansas	Inactive	
**Upsilon-Theta**	1973	Salem State University	Salem, Massachusetts	Active	
Upsilon-Iota	1973	Indiana State University	Terre Haute, Indiana	Inactive	
**Upsilon-Kappa**	1973	Carnegie Mellon University	Pittsburgh, Pennsylvania	Active	
**Upsilon-Kappa**	1973	Carnegie Mellon University in Qatar	Education City, Al Rayyan, Qatar	Active	
**Upsilon-Lambda**	1973	California State Polytechnic University, Pomona	Pomona, California	Active	
Upsilon-Mu	1973	University of Virginia	Charlottesville, Virginia	Inactive	
**Upsilon-Nu**	1973	College of the Ozarks	Point Lookout, Missouri	Active	
Upsilon-Xi	1973	Rust College	Holly Springs, Mississippi	Inactive	
Upsilon-Omicron	1973	University of Saint Mary	Leavenworth, Kansas	Inactive	
**Upsilon-Pi**	1973	Montana State University	Bozeman, Montana	Active	
**Upsilon-Rho**	1973	Worcester State University	Worcester, Massachusetts	Active	
**Upsilon-Sigma**	1973	Montclair State University	Montclair, New Jersey	Active	
**Upsilon-Tau**	1973	Dillard University	New Orleans, Louisiana	Active	
**Upsilon-Upsilon**	1974	University of the Cumberlands	Williamsburg, Kentucky	Active	
**Upsilon-Phi**	1974	Hampton University	Hampton, Virginia	Active	
Upsilon-Chi	1974	Lincoln University	Jefferson City, Missouri	Inactive	
**Upsilon-Psi**	1974	Cabrini University	Radnor Township, Pennsylvania	Active	
**Upsilon-Omega**	1974	Roanoke College	Salem, Virginia	Active	
**Phi-Alpha**	1974	Illinois College	Jacksonville, Illinois	Active	
**Phi-Beta**	1974	Portland State University	Portland, Oregon	Active	
**Phi-Gamma**	1974	University of Maine	Orono, Maine	Active	
**Phi-Delta**	1974	DePaul University	Chicago, Illinois	Active	
**Phi-Epsilon**	1974	Prairie View A&M University	Prairie View, Texas	Active	
**Phi-Zeta**	1974	Mercy University	Dobbs Ferry, New York	Active	
**Phi-Eta**	1974	Westminster University	Salt Lake City, Utah	Active	
Phi-Theta	1974	University of North Carolina at Asheville	Asheville, North Carolina	Inactive	
Phi-Iota	1974	Sacred Heart University	Fairfield, Connecticut	Inactive	
Phi-Kappa	197x ?	University of Texas Permian Basin	Odessa, Texas	Inactive	
**Phi-Lambda**	1975	Pepperdine University	Malibu, California	Active	
**Phi-Mu**	1975	St. Joseph's University, Long Island Campus	Patchogue, New York	Active	
Phi-Nu	1975	Fort Valley State University	Fort Valley, Georgia	Inactive	
**Phi-Xi**	1975	University of New Haven	West Haven, Connecticut	Active	
**Phi-Omicron**	1975	Meredith College	Raleigh, North Carolina	Active	
**Phi-Pi**	1975	McNeese State University	Lake Charles, Louisiana	Active	
Phi-Rho	1975	Pfeiffer University	Misenheimer, North Carolina	Inactive	
Phi-Sigma	1975	Asbury University	Wilmore, Kentucky	Inactive	
**Phi-Tau**	1975	Emory University	Atlanta, Georgia	Active	
**Phi-Upsilon**	1975	Columbus State University	Columbus, Georgia	Active	
Phi-Phi	1975	Lincoln University	Lower Oxford Township, Pennsylvania	Inactive	
**Phi-Chi**	1975	George Washington University	Washington, D.C.	Active	
**Phi-Psi**	1975	Metropolitan State University of Denver	Denver, Colorado	Active	
Phi-Omega	1976	St. Mary's Dominican College	New Orleans, Louisiana	Inactive	(Note: The college closed in 1984.)
**Chi-Alpha**	1976	University at Buffalo	Buffalo, New York	Active	
**Chi-Beta**	1976	University of North Carolina at Charlotte	Charlotte, North Carolina	Active	
Chi-Gamma	1976	PennWest Clarion	Clarion, Pennsylvania	Inactive	
**Chi-Delta**	1976	University at Albany, SUNY	Albany, New York	Active	
Chi-Epsilon	1976	Oral Roberts University	Tulsa, Oklahoma	Inactive	
**Chi-Zeta**	1976	Valparaiso University	Valparaiso, Indiana	Active	
**Chi-Eta**	1976	Franklin Pierce University	Rindge, New Hampshire	Active	
**Chi-Theta**	1976	Ouachita Baptist University	Arkadelphia, Arkansas	Active	
**Chi-Iota**	1976	Central Connecticut State University	New Britain, Connecticut	Active	
**Chi-Kappa**	1976	Shippensburg University	Shippensburg, Pennsylvania	Active	
**Chi-Lambda**	1976	Georgia College & State University	Milledgeville, Georgia	Active	
**Chi-Mu**	1976	Loyola University Chicago	Chicago, Illinois	Active	
**Chi-Nu**	1976	Newberry College	Newberry, South Carolina	Active	
Chi-Xi	1976	Birmingham–Southern College	Birmingham, Alabama	Inactive	
**Chi-Omicron**	1976	University of Alabama at Birmingham	Birmingham, Alabama	Active	
Chi-Pi	1976	Douglass College	New Brunswick, New Jersey	Inactive	(Note: School closed as a degree-granting college in 2007.)
**Chi-Rho**	1976	Idaho State University	Pocatello, Idaho	Active	
Chi-Sigma	1976	St. Olaf College	Northfield, Minnesota	Inactive	
Chi-Tau	1976	Mars Hill University	Mars Hill, North Carolina	Inactive	
**Chi-Upsilon**	1976	Hillsdale College	Hillsdale, Michigan	Active	
**Chi-Phi**	1977	Fordham University	New York City, New York	Active	
**Chi-Chi**	1977	St. John's University (New York City)	New York City, New York	Active	
**Chi-Psi**	1977	Auburn University at Montgomery	Montgomery, Alabama	Active	
**Chi-Omega**	1977	University of Michigan–Flint	Flint, Michigan	Active	
Psi-Alpha	1977	University of Texas at Tyler	Tyler, Texas	Inactive	
**Psi-Beta**	1977	Valley City State University	Valley City, North Dakota	Active	
Psi-Gamma	1977	St. Augustine's University	Raleigh, North Carolina	Inactive	
**Psi-Delta**	1977	University of Maryland, Baltimore County	Catonsville, Maryland	Active	
Psi-Epsilon (see **Omicron-Delta)**	1977	Fairleigh Dickinson University, Rutherford	Rutherford, New Jersey	Consolidated	(Note: Chapter merged with the chapter at Fairleigh Dickinson University Teaneck. The Rutherford campus was closed and sold in 1993.)
**Psi-Zeta**	1977	California State University, Bakersfield	Bakersfield, California	Active	
**Psi-Eta**	1977	University of North Florida	Jacksonville, Florida	Active	
**Psi-Theta**	1977	Fairfield University	Fairfield, Connecticut	Active	
**Psi-Iota**	1977	Glassboro State College	Glassboro, New Jersey	Active	
**Psi-Kappa**	1977	Hollins University	Hollins, Virginia	Active	
**Psi-Lambda**	1978	Saint Mary's College	Notre Dame, Indiana	Active	
**Psi-Mu**	1978	Coastal Carolina University	Conway, South Carolina	Active	
**Psi-Nu**	1978	Elon University	Elon, North Carolina	Active	
**Psi-Xi**	1978	Erskine College	Due West, South Carolina	Active	
**Psi-Omicron**	1978	Fairmont State University	Fairmont, West Virginia	Active	
**Psi-Pi**	1978	University of New Hampshire	Durham, New Hampshire	Active	
**Psi-Rho**	1978	Hampden–Sydney College	Hampden Sydney, Virginia	Active	
**Psi-Sigma**	1978	University of Nevada, Las Vegas	Paradise, Nevada	Active	
**Psi-Tau**	1978	Elmira College	Elmira, New York	Active	
**Psi-Upsilon**	1978	Point Loma Nazarene University	Point Loma, San Diego, California	Active	
Psi-Phi	1978	Valdosta State University	Valdosta, Georgia	Inactive	
**Psi-Chi**	1978	University of Redlands	Redlands, California	Active	
**Psi-Psi**	1978	University of Missouri, St. Louis	St. Louis, Missouri	Active	
**Psi-Omega**	1978	LIU Post	Brookville, New York	Active	
**Omega-Alpha**	1979	Kean University	Union Township, New Jersey	Active	
**Omega-Beta**	1979	Jackson State University	Jackson, Mississippi	Active	
**Omega-Gamma**	1979	State University of New York at Oswego	Oswego, New York	Active	
Omega-Delta	1979	Houghton University	Houghton, New York	Inactive	
**Omega-Epsilon**	1979	University of Delaware	Newark, Delaware	Active	
**Omega-Zeta**	1979	Texas Wesleyan University	Fort Worth, Texas	Active	
**Omega-Eta**	1979	Carroll College	Helena, Montana	Active	
**Omega-Theta**	1979	Grand Valley State University	Allendale, Michigan	Active	
**Omega-Iota**	1980	Wilkes University	Wilkes-Barre, Pennsylvania	Active	
**Omega-Kappa**	1980	United States Naval Academy	Annapolis, Maryland	Active	
**Omega-Lambda**	1980	Wayne State University	Detroit, Michigan	Active	
Omega-Mu	1980	University of Wisconsin–Parkside	Kenosha, Wisconsin	Inactive	
Omega-Nu	1980	Yankton College	Yankton, South Dakota	Inactive	
**Omega-Xi**	1980	North Central College	Naperville, Illinois	Active	
**Omega-Omicron**	1980	Boise State University	Boise, Idaho	Active	
**Omega-Pi**	1980	Virginia Wesleyan University	Virginia Beach, Virginia	Active	
**Omega-Rho**	1980	Drexel University	Philadelphia, Pennsylvania	Active	
Omega-Sigma	1981	Talladega College	Talladega, Alabama	Inactive	
**Omega-Tau**	1981	Trinity University	San Antonio, Texas	Active	
**Omega-Upsilon**	1981	McDaniel College	Westminster, Maryland	Active	(Note: Chapter formed at Western Maryland College, now McDaniel College.)
**Omega-Phi**	1981	College of Charleston	Charleston, South Carolina	Active	
Omega-Chi	1981	Seattle Pacific University	Seattle, Washington	Inactive	
**Omega-Psi**	1981	Eastern Washington University	Cheney, Washington	Active	
**Omega-Omega**	1981	University of California, Davis	Davis, California	Active	
**Alpha-Alpha-Alpha**	1981	Biola University	La Mirada, California	Active	
**Alpha-Alpha-Beta**	1981	Saint Francis University	Loretto, Pennsylvania	Active	
**Alpha-Alpha-Gamma**	1981	Northwest Missouri State University	Maryville, Missouri	Active	
**Alpha-Alpha-Delta**	1982	University of Rio Grande	Rio Grande, Ohio	Active	
**Alpha-Alpha-Epsilon**	1982	Kennesaw State University	Kennesaw, Georgia	Active	
Alpha-Alpha-Zeta	1982	University of Michigan	Ann Arbor, Michigan	Inactive	
**Alpha-Alpha-Eta**	1982	Virginia State University	Ettrick, Virginia	Active	
**Alpha-Alpha-Theta**	1982	South Dakota State University	Brookings, South Dakota	Active	
**Alpha-Alpha-Iota**	1982	Liberty University	Lynchburg, Virginia	Active	
**Alpha-Alpha-Kappa**	1982	Cameron University	Lawton, Oklahoma	Active	
**Alpha-Alpha-Lambda**	1982	Grove City College	Grove City, Pennsylvania	Active	
Alpha-Alpha-Mu	1982	University of Texas at Brownsville	Brownsville, Texas	Inactive	(Note: UT Brownsville merged with UT–Pan American to form The University of Texas Rio Grande Valley in 2015.)
**Alpha-Alpha-Nu**	1982	Coppin State University	Baltimore, Maryland	Active	
**Alpha-Alpha-Xi**	1982	University of Mobile	Mobile, Alabama	Active	
**Alpha-Alpha-Omicron**	1983	Drew University	Madison, New Jersey	Active	
**Alpha-Alpha-Pi**	1983	Iona University	New Rochelle, New York	Active	
**Alpha-Alpha-Rho**	1983	Immaculata University	East Whiteland Township, Pennsylvania	Active	
**Alpha-Alpha-Sigma**	1983	Molloy University	Rockville Centre, New York	Active	
Alpha-Alpha-Tau	1983	Whitworth University	Spokane, Washington	Inactive	
**Alpha-Alpha-Upsilon**	1983	University of Indianapolis	Indianapolis, Indiana	Active	
**Alpha-Alpha-Phi**	1983	North Carolina State University	Raleigh, North Carolina	Active	
**Alpha-Alpha-Chi**	1983	Rockhurst University	Kansas City, Missouri	Active	
**Alpha-Alpha-Psi**	1983	University of Vermont	Burlington, Vermont	Active	
**Alpha-Alpha-Omega**	1983	Centenary College of Louisiana	Shreveport, Louisiana	Active	
**Alpha-Beta-Alpha**	1983	Randolph–Macon College	Ashland, Virginia	Active	
**Alpha-Beta-Beta**	1983	Washburn University	Topeka, Kansas	Active	
**Alpha-Beta-Gamma**	1983	University of Alaska Anchorage	Anchorage, Alaska	Active	
**Alpha-Beta-Delta**	1984	Western Michigan University	Kalamazoo, Michigan	Active	
**Alpha-Beta-Epsilon**	1984	University of Hawaiʻi at Mānoa	Honolulu, Hawaii	Active	
**Alpha-Beta-Zeta**	1984	Dickinson College	Carlisle, Pennsylvania	Active	
**Alpha-Beta-Eta**	1984	University of Massachusetts Amherst	Amherst, Massachusetts	Active	
**Alpha-Beta-Theta**	1984	State University of New York at Potsdam	Potsdam, New York	Active	
**Alpha-Beta-Iota**	1984	Vanderbilt University	Nashville, Tennessee	Active	
**Alpha-Beta-Kappa**	1984	Washington University in St. Louis	St. Louis, Missouri	Active	
Alpha-Beta-Lambda	1984	Athens State University	Athens, Alabama	Inactive	
**Alpha-Beta-Mu**	1984	Eastern Michigan University	Ypsilanti, Michigan	Active	
Alpha-Beta-Nu	1984	University of Missouri	Columbia, Missouri	Inactive	
Alpha-Beta-Xi	1984	Goshen College	Goshen, Indiana	Inactive	
**Alpha-Beta-Omicron**	1985	University of Hawaiʻi at Hilo	Hilo, Hawaii	Active	
**Alpha-Beta-Pi**	1985	Florida International University	Westchester, Florida	Active	
Alpha-Beta-Rho	1985	Oklahoma Panhandle State University	Goodwell, Oklahoma	Inactive	
Alpha-Beta-Sigma	1985	Clemson University	Clemson, South Carolina	Inactive	
**Alpha-Beta-Tau**	1985	Keene State College	Keene, New Hampshire	Active	
**Alpha-Beta-Upsilon**	1985	University of Lynchburg	Lynchburg, Virginia	Active	
**Alpha-Beta-Phi**	1985	Northern Kentucky University	Highland Heights, Kentucky	Active	
**Alpha-Beta-Chi**	1985	Tarleton State University	Stephenville, Texas	Active	
**Alpha-Beta-Psi**	1985	Simpson College	Indianola, Iowa	Active	
**Alpha-Beta-Omega**	1985	Massachusetts College of Liberal Arts	North Adams, Massachusetts	Active	(Note: Chapter formed at North Adams State College, now the Massachusetts College of Liberal Arts.)
**Alpha-Gamma-Alpha**	1985	State University of New York at Plattsburgh	Plattsburgh, New York	Active	
**Alpha-Gamma-Beta**	1985	Youngstown State University	Youngstown, Ohio	Active	
**Alpha-Gamma-Gamma**	1985	University of Colorado Denver	Denver, Colorado	Active	
Alpha-Gamma-Delta	1985	Berea College	Berea, Kentucky	Inactive	
**Alpha-Gamma-Epsilon**	1985	Colorado Mesa University	Grand Junction, Colorado	Active	
**Alpha-Gamma-Zeta**	1985	Emporia State University	Emporia, Kansas	Active	
**Alpha-Gamma-Eta**	1985	Briar Cliff University	Sioux City, Iowa	Active	
**Alpha-Gamma-Theta**	1985	Presbyterian College	Clinton, South Carolina	Active	
**Alpha-Gamma-Iota**	1985	LeMoyne–Owen College	Memphis, Tennessee	Active	
**Alpha-Gamma-Kappa**	1985	Queens University of Charlotte	Charlotte, North Carolina	Active	
**Alpha-Gamma-Lambda**	1986	State University of New York, Brockport	Brockport, New York	Active	
**Alpha-Gamma-Mu**	1986	Virginia Military Institute	Lexington, Virginia	Active	
**Alpha-Gamma-Nu**	1986	University of California, Irvine	Irvine, California	Active	
**Alpha-Gamma-Xi**	1986	Eastern Oregon University	La Grande, Oregon	Active	
**Alpha-Gamma-Omicron**	1986	Weber State University	Ogden, Utah	Active	
Alpha-Gamma-Pi	1986	University of Southern Maine	Gorham, Maine	Inactive	
**Alpha-Gamma-Rho**	1986	Mount Marty University	Yankton, South Dakota	Active	
**Alpha-Gamma-Sigma**	1987	Hastings College	Hastings, Nebraska	Active	
**Alpha-Gamma-Tau**	1987	Louisiana State University Shreveport	Shreveport, Louisiana	Active	
**Alpha-Gamma-Upsilon**	1987	George Mason University	Fairfax County, Virginia	Active	
**Alpha-Gamma-Phi**	1987	Ursinus College	Collegeville, Pennsylvania	Active	
**Alpha-Gamma-Chi**	1987	University of Central Florida	Orlando, Florida	Active	
**Alpha-Gamma-Psi**	1987	Hardin–Simmons University	Abilene, Texas	Active	
**Alpha-Gamma-Omega**	1987	University of Wisconsin–Green Bay	Green Bay, Wisconsin	Active	
**Alpha-Delta-Alpha**	1987	Rockford University	Rockford, Illinois	Active	
Alpha-Delta-Beta	1987	Saint Joseph's College	Collegeville, Indiana	Inactive	
**Alpha-Delta-Gamma**	1987	Sewanee: The University of the South	Sewanee, Tennessee	Active	
**Alpha-Delta-Delta**	1987	University of Tennessee at Martin	Martin, Tennessee	Active	
Alpha-Delta-Epsilon	1987	Whitman College	Walla Walla, Washington	Inactive	
**Alpha-Delta-Zeta**	1988	Georgian Court University	Lakewood Township, New Jersey	Active	
Alpha-Delta-Eta		University of Evansville	Evansville, Indiana	Inactive	
**Alpha-Delta-Theta**	1988	University at Buffalo	Buffalo, New York	Active	
**Alpha-Delta-Iota**	1988	Niagara University	Lewiston, New York	Active	
**Alpha-Delta-Kappa**	1988	University of Southern Indiana	Evansville, Indiana	Active	
**Alpha-Delta-Lambda**	1988	University of Oregon	Eugene, Oregon	Active	
**Alpha-Delta-Mu**	1988	LaGrange College	LaGrange, Georgia	Active	
**Alpha-Delta-Nu**	1988	California State University, San Bernardino	San Bernardino, California	Active	
**Alpha-Delta-Xi**	1988	University of North Carolina at Pembroke	Pembroke, North Carolina	Active	
**Alpha-Delta-Omicron**	1988	California State University, Chico	Chico, California	Active	
**Alpha-Delta-Pi**	1988	Ramapo College	Mahwah, New Jersey	Active	
**Alpha-Delta-Rho**	1989	University of Houston–Clear Lake	Houston, Texas	Active	
**Alpha-Delta-Sigma**	1989	Caldwell University	Caldwell, New Jersey	Active	
**Alpha-Delta-Tau**	1989	Skidmore College	Saratoga Springs, New York	Active	
**Alpha-Delta-Upsilon**	1989	Texas A&M University–Texarkana	Texarkana, Texas	Active	(Note: Chapter formed at East Texas State University Center at Texarkana, now Texas A&M University–Texarkana.)
**Alpha-Delta-Phi**	1989	Christian Brothers University	Memphis, Tennessee	Active	
Alpha-Delta-Chi	1989	Linfield University	McMinnville, Oregon	Inactive	
**Alpha-Delta-Psi**	1989	McKendree University	Lebanon, Illinois	Active	
Alpha-Delta-Omega	1989	University of Michigan–Dearborn	Dearborn, Michigan	Inactive	
**Alpha-Epsilon-Alpha**	1990	Missouri Southern State University	Joplin, Missouri	Active	
Alpha-Epsilon-Beta	1990	Brooklyn College	Brooklyn, New York City, New York	Inactive	
**Alpha-Epsilon-Gamma**	1990	Yale University	New Haven, Connecticut	Active	
**Alpha-Epsilon-Delta**	1990	Rhodes College	Memphis, Tennessee	Active	
**Alpha-Epsilon-Epsilon**	1990	East Tennessee State University	Johnson City, Tennessee	Active	
Alpha-Epsilon-Zeta	1990	Atlantic Union College	South Lancaster, Massachusetts	Inactive	
**Alpha-Epsilon-Eta**	1990	Furman University	Greenville, South Carolina	Active	
**Alpha-Epsilon-Theta**	1990	Purdue University Northwest	Hammond, Indiana	Active	(Note: Chapter formed at Purdue University North Central, now Purdue University Northwest.)
Alpha-Epsilon-Iota	1990	Mount Holyoke College	South Hadley, Massachusetts	Inactive	
**Alpha-Epsilon-Kappa**	1990	Wheaton College	Wheaton, Illinois	Active	
**Alpha-Epsilon-Lambda**	1990	California State University, Stanislaus	Turlock, California	Active	
**Alpha-Epsilon-Mu**	1990	United States Military Academy	West Point, New York	Active	
**Alpha-Epsilon-Nu**	1991	Saint Michael's College	Colchester, Vermont	Active	
**Alpha-Epsilon-Xi**	1991	Providence College	Providence, Rhode Island	Active	
**Alpha-Epsilon-Omicron**	1991	Brandeis University	Waltham, Massachusetts	Active	
**Alpha-Epsilon-Pi**	1991	Wabash College	Crawfordsville, Indiana	Active	
**Alpha-Epsilon-Rho**	1991	Assumption University	Worcester, Massachusetts	Active	
**Alpha-Epsilon-Sigma**	1991	Spelman College	Atlanta, Georgia	Active	
**Alpha-Epsilon-Tau**	1991	Ferrum College	Ferrum, Virginia	Active	
**Alpha-Epsilon-Upsilon**	1991	Hamilton College	Clinton, New York	Active	
**Alpha-Epsilon-Phi**	1991	Missouri University of Science and Technology	Rolla, Missouri	Active	(Note: Chapter formed at the University of Missouri–Rolla, now the Missouri University of Science and Technology.)
**Alpha-Epsilon-Chi**	1991	University of Maryland Global Campus	Adelphi, Maryland	Active	
**Alpha-Epsilon-Psi**	1991	University of Holy Cross	New Orleans, Louisiana	Active	(Note: Chapter formed at Our Lady of Holy Cross College, now the University of Holy Cross.)
Alpha-Epsilon-Omega	1991	St. Cloud State University	St. Cloud, Minnesota	Inactive	
Alpha-Zeta-Alpha	1991	South Carolina State University	Orangeburg, South Carolina	Inactive	
**Alpha-Zeta-Beta**	1991	Southern University	Baton Rouge, Louisiana	Active	
**Alpha-Zeta-Gamma**	1992	University of Washington Tacoma	Tacoma, Washington	Active	
**Alpha-Zeta-Delta**	1992	University of North Carolina Wilmington	Wilmington, North Carolina	Active	
**Alpha-Zeta-Epsilon**	1992	East Central University	Ada, Oklahoma	Active	
**Alpha-Zeta-Zeta**	1992	Wayne State College	Wayne, Nebraska	Active	
Alpha-Zeta-Eta	1992	St. John's University Grymes Hill campus	Staten Island, New York	Inactive	(Note: St. John's closed the Grymes Hill campus in the spring of 2024.)
Alpha-Zeta-Theta	1992	Pacific Union College	Angwin, California	Inactive	
**Alpha-Zeta-Iota**	1992	University of Illinois Springfield	Springfield, Illinois	Active	(Note: Chapter formed at Sangamon State University, now the University of Illinois Springfield.)
Alpha-Zeta-Kappa	1992	University of Tennessee	Knoxville, Tennessee	Inactive	
**Alpha-Zeta-Lambda**	1993	Mercer University	Macon, Georgia	Active	
**Alpha-Zeta-Mu**	1993	Christopher Newport University	Newport News, Virginia	Active	
**Alpha-Zeta-Nu**	1993	Capital University	Bexley, Ohio	Active	
Alpha-Zeta-Xi	1993	Williams Baptist University	Walnut Ridge, Arkansas	Inactive	
**Alpha-Zeta-Omicron**	1993	Mount Saint Mary College	Newburgh, New York	Active	
**Alpha-Zeta-Pi**	1993	Clark University	Worcester, Massachusetts	Active	
Alpha-Zeta-Rho	1993	Gannon University	Erie, Pennsylvania	Inactive	
**Alpha-Zeta-Sigma**	1993	Vanguard University	Costa Mesa, California	Active	(Note: Chapter formed at Southern California College, now Vanguard University.)
**Alpha-Zeta-Tau**	1993	United States Air Force Academy	El Paso County, Colorado	Active	
**Alpha-Zeta-Upsilon**	1993	Oakland University	Auburn Hills, Michigan	Active	
Alpha-Zeta-Phi	1993	Rollins College, Brevard Campus	West Melbourne, Florida	Inactive	(Note: Rollins closed its Brevard campus in August 2004.)
**Alpha-Zeta-Chi**	1993	California State University, San Marcos	San Marcos, California	Active	
Alpha-Zeta-Psi	1994	College of St. Joseph	Rutland County, Vermont	Inactive	
**Alpha-Zeta-Omega**	1994	St. Ambrose University	Davenport, Iowa	Active	
**Alpha-Eta-Alpha**	1994	Mercyhurst University	Erie, Pennsylvania	Active	
Alpha-Eta-Beta	1994	Marian University	Fond du Lac, Wisconsin	Inactive	(Note: Chapter formed at the Marian College of Fond du Lac, now Marian University.)
**Alpha-Eta-Gamma**	1994	Lenoir–Rhyne University	Hickory, North Carolina	Active	
**Alpha-Eta-Delta**	1994	Longwood University	Farmville, Virginia	Active	
**Alpha-Eta-Epsilon**	1994	University of Alaska Fairbanks	College, Alaska	Active	
**Alpha-Eta-Zeta**	1995	Southern Illinois University Edwardsville	Edwardsville, Illinois	Active	
Alpha-Eta-Eta	1995	Southern Utah University	Cedar City, Utah	Inactive	
Alpha-EtaTheta	1995	University of Massachusetts Dartmouth	Dartmouth, Massachusetts	Inactive	
**Alpha-Eta-Iota**	1995	Holy Family University	Philadelphia, Pennsylvania	Active	
**Alpha-Eta-Kappa**	1995	Roger Williams University	Bristol, Rhode Island	Active	
**Alpha-Eta-Lambda**	1995	Culver–Stockton College	Canton, Missouri	Active	
**Alpha-Eta-Mu**	1995	Widener University	Chester, Pennsylvania	Active	
**Alpha-Eta-Nu**	1995	Rollins College	Winter Park, Florida	Active	
**Alpha-Eta-Xi**	1995	Augusta State University	Augusta, Georgia	Active	
**Alpha-Eta-Omicron**	1995	Seattle University	Seattle, Washington	Active	
**Alpha-Eta-Pi**	1995	Concordia College	Moorhead, Minnesota	Active	
Alpha-Eta-Rho	1995	Alvernia University	Reading, Pennsylvania	Inactive	
**Alpha-Eta-Sigma**	1995	Elizabeth City State University	Elizabeth City, North Carolina	Active	
Alpha-Eta-Tau	1995	Central College	Pella, Iowa	Inactive	
Alpha-Eta-Upsilon		Clark Atlanta University	Atlanta, Georgia	Inactive	
**Alpha-Eta-Phi**	1996	Bridgewater College	Bridgewater, Virginia	Active	
**Alpha-Eta-Chi**	1996	Allegheny College	Meadville, Pennsylvania	Active	
**Alpha-Eta-Psi**	1996	Chestnut Hill College	Philadelphia, Pennsylvania	Active	
**Alpha-Eta-Omega**	1996	George Fox University	Newberg, Oregon	Active	
**Alpha-Theta-Alpha**	1996	Kansas Wesleyan University	Salina, Kansas	Active	
**Alpha-Theta-Beta**	1996	University of Pittsburgh at Johnstown	Johnstown, Pennsylvania	Active	
**Alpha-Theta-Gamma**	1996	Arkansas Tech University	Russellville, Arkansas	Active	
Alpha-Theta-Delta	1996	Limestone University	Gaffney, South Carolina	Inactive	(Note: The college closed in 2025.)
**Alpha-Theta-Epsilon**	1996	Binghamton University	Vestal, New York	Active	
**Alpha-Theta-Zeta**	1996	Francis Marion University	Florence, South Carolina	Active	
Alpha-Theta-Eta	1997	Norfolk State University	Norfolk, Virginia	Inactive	
Alpha-Theta-Theta	1997	Mississippi Valley State University	Mississippi Valley State, Mississippi	Inactive	
**Alpha-Theta-Iota**	1997	University of Texas at San Antonio	San Antonio, Texas	Active	
**Alpha-Theta-Kappa**	1997	Colorado State University Pueblo	Pueblo, Colorado	Active	(Note: Chapter formed at the University of Southern Colorado, now Colorado State University Pueblo.)
**Alpha-Theta-Lambda**	1997	Chowan University	Murfreesboro, North Carolina	Active	
Alpha-Theta-Mu	1997	Southwestern University	Georgetown, Texas	Inactive	
**Alpha-Theta-Nu**	1997	Claremont McKenna College	Claremont, California	Active	
**Alpha-Theta-Nu**	1997	Scribbs College	Claremont, California	Active	
**Alpha-Theta-Xi**	1997	State University of New York at New Paltz	New Paltz, New York	Active	
**Alpha-Theta-Omicron**	1997	University of West Alabama	Livingston, Alabama	Active	
**Alpha-Theta-Pi**	1997	Lyon College	Batesville, Arkansas	Active	
Alpha-Theta-Rho		Eastern Nazarene College	Quincy, Massachusetts	Inactive	(Note: The college closed in 2025.)
Alpha-Theta-Sigma		La Sierra University	Riverside, California	Inactive	
**Alpha-Theta-Tau**		York College of Pennsylvania	Spring Garden Township, Pennsylvania	Active	
**Alpha-Theta-Upsilon**		Wisconsin Lutheran College	Milwaukee, Wisconsin	Active	
**Alpha-Theta-Phi**		University of Rochester	Rochester, New York	Active	
**Alpha-Theta-Chi**	1998	Southern Connecticut State University	New Haven, Connecticut	Active	
**Alpha-Theta-Psi**	1998	Agnes Scott College	Decatur, Georgia	Active	
**Alpha-Theta-Omega**		Drake University	Des Moines, Iowa	Active	
**Alpha-Iota-Alpha**		Campbell University	Buies Creek, North Carolina	Active	
**Alpha-Iota-Beta**		Commonwealth University-Mansfield	Mansfield, Pennsylvania	Active	
Alpha-Iota-Gamma		Wheeling University	Wheeling, West Virginia	Inactive	
**Alpha-Iota Delta**		Misericordia University	Dallas, Pennsylvania	Active	
**Alpha-Iota-Epsilon**		Castleton University	Castleton, Vermont	Active	
Alpha-Iota-Zeta				Inactive	
Alpha-Iota-Eta				Inactive	
Alpha-Iota-Theta				Inactive	
**Alpha-Iota-Iota**		Anderson University	Anderson, Indiana	Active	
**Alpha-Iota-Kappa**		St. Mary's College of Maryland	St. Mary's City, Maryland	Active	
**Alpha-Iota-Lambda**		Plymouth State University	Plymouth, New Hampshire	Active	
Alpha-Iota-Mu				Inactive	
**Alpha-Iota-Nu**		Nelson University	Waxahachie, Texas	Active	
**Alpha-Iota-Xi**	2001	Western Oregon University	Monmouth, Oregon	Active	
Alpha-Iota-Omicron				Active	
**Alpha-Iota-Pi**	2001	Hiram College	Hiram, Ohio	Active	
**Alpha-Iota-Rho**		Fairleigh Dickinson University	Madison, New Jersey	Active	
**Alpha-Iota-Sigma**		Marymount University	Arlington County, Virginia	Active	
**Alpha-Iota-Tau**	2001	Milligan University	Milligan College, Tennessee	Active	
**Alpha-Iota-Upsilon**		Stockton University	Galloway Township, New Jersey	Active	
**Alpha-Iota-Phi**	2001	Greensboro College	Greensboro, North Carolina	Active	
**Alpha-Iota-Chi**		Union College	Schenectady, New York	Active	
**Alpha-Iota-Psi**		North Dakota State University	Fargo, North Dakota	Active	
Alpha-Iota-Omega				Inactive	
**Alpha-Kappa-Alpha**		Randolph College	Lynchburg, Virginia	Active	
**Alpha-Kappa-Beta**	2002	California State University, Fresno	Fresno, California	Active	
**Alpha-Kappa-Gamma**		Nazareth University	Pittsford, New York	Active	
**Alpha-Kappa-Delta**	2002	Hood College	Frederick, Maryland	Active	
Alpha-Kappa-Epsilon				Inactive	
Alpha-Kappa-Zeta				Inactive	
**Alpha-Kappa-Eta**		Lee University	Cleveland, Tennessee	Active	
Alpha-Kappa-Theta				Inactive	
**Alpha-Kappa-Iota**		State University of New York at Oneonta	Oneonta, New York	Active	
**Alpha-Kappa-Kappa**		Utah Valley University	Orem, Utah	Active	
**Alpha-Kappa-Lambda**		University of Virginia's College at Wise	Wise, Virginia	Active	
**Alpha-Kappa-Mu**		Columbia College	Columbia, Missouri	Active	
**Alpha-Kappa-Nu**		Oklahoma Baptist University	Shawnee, Oklahoma	Active	
**Alpha-Kappa-Xi**		Brigham Young University–Idaho	Rexburg, Idaho	Active	
**Alpha-Kappa-Omicron**		Rutgers University–Camden	Camden, New Jersey	Active	
**Alpha-Kappa-Pi**	2003	Duke University	Durham, North Carolina	Active	
**Alpha-Kappa-Rho**		Western New England University	Springfield, Massachusetts	Active	
**Alpha-Kappa-Sigma**	April 4, 2003	Messiah University	Grantham, Pennsylvania	Active	
Alpha-Kappa-Tau				Inactive	
**Alpha-Kappa-Upsilon**		Juniata College	Huntingdon, Pennsylvania	Active	
**Alpha-Kappa-Phi**		Georgia Tech	Atlanta, Georgia	Active	
**Alpha-Kappa-Chi**		Georgia Southwestern State University	Americus, Georgia	Active	
**Alpha-Kappa-Psi**	October 2003	Saint Leo University	St. Leo, Florida	Active	
**Alpha-Kappa-Omega**		Salve Regina University	Newport, Rhode Island	Active	
Alpha-Lambda-Alpha				Inactive	
**Alpha-Lambda-Beta**		Quinnipiac University	Hamden, Connecticut	Active	
Alpha-Lambda-Gamma				Inactive	
Alpha-Lambda-Delta				Inactive	
Alpha-Lambda-Epsilon				Inactive	
Alpha-Lambda-Zeta				Inactive	
**Alpha-Lambda-Eta**		Millersville University	Millersville, Pennsylvania	Active	
**Alpha-Lambda-Theta**		Florida Gulf Coast University	Fort Myers, Florida	Active	
**Alpha-Lambda-Iota**		Shenandoah University	Winchester, Virginia	Active	
**Alpha-Lambda-Kappa**	March 2004	Alfred University	Alfred, New York	Active	
Alpha-Lambda-Lambda				Inactive	
**Alpha-Lambda-Mu**		North Park University	Chicago, Illinois	Active	
**Alpha-Lambda-Nu**	2004	Lourdes University	Sylvania, Ohio	Active	
**Alpha-Lambda-Xi**		Madonna University	Livonia, Michigan	Active	
Alpha-Lambda-Omicron				Inactive	
**Alpha-Lambda-Pi**	2005	Dickinson State University	Dickinson, North Dakota	Active	
**Alpha-Lambda-Rho**		Florida A&M University	Tallahassee, Florida	Active	
**Alpha-Lambda-Sigma**		Missouri Western State University	St. Joseph, Missouri	Active	
Alpha-Lambda-Tau				Inactive	
Alpha-Lambda-Upsilon				Inactive	
**Alpha-Lambda-Phi**		Centenary University	Hackettstown, New Jersey	Active	
**Alpha-Lambda-Chi**		St. Norbert College	De Pere, Wisconsin	Active	
Alpha-Lambda-Psi				Inactive	
Alpha-Lambda-Omicron				Inactive	
**Alpha-Mu-Alpha**	May 10, 2005	Eastern Connecticut State University	Willimantic, Connecticut	Active	
**Alpha-Mu-Beta**	2005	Reinhardt University	Waleska, Georgia	Active	
**Alpha-Mu-Gamma**		Chapman University	Orange, California	Active	
Alpha-Mu-Delta				Inactive	
**Alpha-Mu-Epsilon**	2005	University of Massachusetts Lowell	Lowell, Massachusetts	Active	
Alpha-Mu-Zeta				Inactive	
**Alpha-Mu-Eta**	2005	Nichols College	Dudley, Massachusetts	Active	
**Alpha-Mu-Theta**		Hawaii Pacific University	Honolulu, Hawaii	Active	
**Alpha-Mu-Iota**		University of Texas at Dallas	Richardson, Texas	Active	
Alpha-Mu-Kappa				Inactive	
**Alpha-Mu-Lambda**		Augsburg University	Minneapolis, Minnesota	Active	
**Alpha-Mu-Mu**		Benedictine University	Lisle, Illinois	Active	
**Alpha-Mu-Nu**	2006	DePauw University	Greencastle, Indiana	Active	
**Alpha-Mu-Xi**		Penn State Altoona	Logan Township, Pennsylvania	Active	
Alpha-Mu-Omicron				Inactive	
**Alpha-Mu-Pi**		Xavier University of Louisiana	New Orleans, Louisiana	Active	
**Alpha-Mu-Rho**		Austin College	Sherman, Texas	Active	
**Alpha-Mu-Sigma**		Southern Virginia University	Buena Vista, Virginia	Active	
**Alpha-Mu-Tau**		Louisiana Christian University	Pineville, Louisiana	Active	
**Alpha-Mu-Upsilon**		Dominican University of California	San Rafael, California	Active	
**Alpha-Mu-Phi**		University of the Incarnate Word	San Antonio, Texas	Active	
Alpha-Mu-Chi				Inactive	
**Alpha-Mu-Psi**	2007	Maryville College	Maryville, Tennessee	Active	
**Alpha-Mu-Omega**		University of the Pacific	Stockton, California	Active	
**Alpha-Nu-Alpha**		New Jersey Institute of Technology	Newark, New Jersey	Active	
**Alpha-Nu-Beta**		University of New Orleans	New Orleans, Louisiana	Active	
**Alpha-Nu-Gamma**	200x ?	California Polytechnic State University, San Luis Obispo	San Luis Obispo, California	Active	
**Alpha-Nu-Delta**		St. Edward's University	Austin, Texas	Active	
Alpha-Nu-Epsilon				Inactive	
**Alpha-Nu-Zeta**		University of Arkansas at Monticello	Monticello, Arkansas	Active	
**Alpha-Nu-Eta**		Palm Beach Atlantic University	West Palm Beach, Florida	Active	
**Alpha-Nu-Theta**		Freed–Hardeman University	Henderson, Tennessee	Active	
**Alpha-Nu-Iota**	November 20, 2008	Trinity Washington University	Washington, D.C.	Active	
Alpha-Nu-Kappa				Inactive	
**Alpha-Nu-Lambda**		Bryant University	Smithfield, Rhode Island	Active	
**Alpha-Nu-Mu**		Touro University	New York City, New York	Active	
**Alpha-Nu-Nu**		Lindenwood University	St. Charles, Missouri	Active	
**Alpha-Nu-Xi**		Davidson College	Davidson, North Carolina	Active	
**Alpha-Nu-Omicron**		Aurora University	Aurora, Illinois	Active	
Alpha-Nu-Pi				Inactive	
**Alpha-Nu-Rho**		Ferris State University	Big Rapids, Michigan	Active	
**Alpha-Nu-Sigma**	2008	Walsh University	North Canton, Ohio	Active	
**Alpha-Nu-Tau**		Indiana University Northwest	Gary, Indiana	Active	
**Alpha-Nu-Upsilon**		University of Houston–Downtown	Houston, Texas	Active	
**Alpha-Nu-Phi**		University of New England	Biddeford, Maine	Active	
Alpha-Nu-Chi				Inactive	
**Alpha-Nu-Psi**		Clayton State University	Morrow, Georgia	Active	
**Alpha-Nu-Omega**		Flagler College	St. Augustine, Florida	Active	
Alpha-Xi-Alpha				Inactive	
**Alpha-Xi-Beta**		Dallas Baptist University	Dallas, Texas	Active	
**Alpha-Xi-Gamma**		Dominican University New York	Orangeburg, New York	Active	
**Alpha-Xi-Delta**		Southern Nazarene University	Bethany, Oklahoma	Active	
**Alpha-Xi-Epsilon**		Westmont College	Montecito, California	Active	
**Alpha-Xi-Zeta**		Fresno Pacific University	Fresno, California	Active	
**Alpha-Xi-Eta**	2010	University of Wisconsin–La Crosse	La Crosse, Wisconsin	Active	
**Alpha-Xi-Theta**	2010	College of Staten Island	Staten Island, New York	Active	
Alpha-Xi-Iota		Endicott College	Beverly, Massachusetts	Active	
**Alpha-Xi-Kappa**		California State University Channel Islands	Camarillo, California	Active	
**Alpha-Xi-Lambda**		High Point University	High Point, North Carolina	Active	
**Alpha-Xi-Mu**		Washington State University Vancouver	Vancouver, Washington	Active	
**Alpha-Xi-Nu**		North Greenville University	Tigerville, South Carolina	Active	
Alpha-Xi-Xi				Inactive	
**Alpha-Xi-Omicron**		Saint Joseph's College of Maine	Standish, Maine	Active	
**Alpha-Xi-Pi**		Spring Arbor University	Spring Arbor, Michigan	Active	
**Alpha-Xi-Rho**		Bellarmine University	Louisville, Kentucky	Active	
**Alpha-Xi-Sigma**		Campbellsville University	Campbellsville, Kentucky	Active	
**Alpha-Xi-Tau**	2012	Cumberland University	Lebanon, Tennessee	Active	
**Alpha-Xi-Upsilon**		Indiana University-Indianapolis	Indianapolis, Indiana	Active	
**Alpha-Xi-Phi**		Texas A&M University–San Antonio	San Antonio, Texas	Active	
**Alpha-Xi-Chi**		Wartburg College	Waverly, Iowa	Active	
**Alpha-Xi-Psi**	2012	California Lutheran University	Thousand Oaks, California	Active	
**Alpha-Xi-Omega**		State University of New York at Old Westbury	Old Westbury, New York	Active	
**Alpha-Omicron-Alpha**		Texas A&M University–Central Texas	Killeen, Texas	Active	
**Alpha-Omicron-Beta**	April 2013	Geneva College	Beaver Falls, Pennsylvania	Active	
**Alpha-Omicron-Gamma**		Georgia Gwinnett College	Lawrenceville, Georgia	Active	
**Alpha-Omicron-Delta**		Commonwealth University of Pennsylvania-Lock Haven	Lock Haven, Pennsylvania	Active	
**Alpha-Omicron-Epsilon**		Pacific Lutheran University	Parkland, Washington	Active	
**Alpha-Omicron-Zeta**		Penn State Erie, The Behrend College	Erie, Pennsylvania	Active	
**Alpha-Omicron-Eta**		Saint Xavier University	Chicago, Illinois	Active	
**Alpha-Omicron-Theta**		Young Harris College	Young Harris, Georgia	Active	
**Alpha-Omicron-Iota**		Farmingdale State College	East Farmingdale, New York	Active	
Alpha-Omicron-Kappa				Inactive	
**Alpha-Omicron-Lambda**		John Brown University	Siloam Springs, Arkansas	Active	
**Alpha-Omicron-Mu**		University of South Carolina Beaufort	Beaufort, South Carolina	Active	
**Alpha-Omicron- Nu**		Florida Southern College	Lakeland, Florida	Active	
**Alpha-Omicron-Xi**		Simpson University	Redding, California	Active	
Alpha-Omicron-Omicron				Inactive	
**Alpha-Omicron-Pi**		Dalton State College	Dalton, Georgia	Active	
**Alpha-Omicron-Rho**		Saginaw Valley State University	University Center, Michigan	Active	
Alpha-Omicron-Sigma				Inactive	
**Alpha-Omicron-Tau**		Azusa Pacific University	Azusa, California	Active	
**Alpha-Omicron-Upsilon**		Concord University	Athens, West Virginia	Active	
**Alpha-Omicron-Phi**		Morningside University	Sioux City, Iowa	Active	
**Alpha-Omicron-Chi**		Utah Tech University	St. George, Utah	Active	
**Alpha-Omicron-Psi**		Eckerd College	St. Petersburg, Florida	Active	
**Alpha-Omicron-Omega**		Lebanon Valley College	Annville, Pennsylvania	Active	
**Alpha-Pi-Alpha**	2015	Tusculum University	Tusculum, Tennessee	Active	
Alpha-Pi-Beta				Inactive	
**Alpha-Pi-Gamma**	2015	University of Tennessee Southern	Pulaski, Tennessee	Active	
**Alpha-Pi-Delta**		Tuskegee University	Tuskegee, Alabama	Active	
**Alpha-Pi-Epsilon**		Colorado College	Colorado Springs, Colorado	Active	
**Alpha-Pi-Zeta**		Rogers State University	Claremore, Oklahoma	Active	
**Alpha-Pi-Eta**		College of Idaho	Caldwell, Idaho	Active	
**Alpha-Pi-Theta**	2016	University of Science and Arts of Oklahoma	Chickasha, Oklahoma	Active	
Alpha-Pi-Iota				Inactive	
**Alpha-Pi-Kappa**		Schreiner University	Kerrville, Texas	Active	
Alpha-Pi-Lambda				Inactive	
**Alpha-Pi-Mu**	2019	Belmont Abbey College	Belmont, North Carolina	Active	
**Alpha-Pi-Nu**		University of La Verne	La Verne, California	Active	
Alpha-Pi-Xi				Inactive	
**Alpha-Pi-Omicron**		Trevecca Nazarene University	Nashville, Tennessee	Active	
**Alpha-Pi-Pi**		Covenant College	Lookout Mountain, Georgia	Active	
**Alpha-Pi-Rho**		Lewis–Clark State College	Lewiston, Idaho	Active	
**Alpha-Pi-Sigma**		Grambling State University	Grambling, Louisiana	Active	
**Alpha-Pi-Tau**		Nevada State University	Henderson, Nevada	Active	
**Alpha-Pi-Upsilon**		Savannah State University	Savannah, Georgia	Active	
**Alpha-Pi-Phi**	2020	Dartmouth College	Hanover, New Hampshire	Active	
**Alpha-Pi-Chi**		Malone University	Canton, Ohio	Active	
**Alpha-Pi-Psi**		Simmons University	Boston, Massachusetts	Active	
**Alpha-Pi-Omega**	2020	Taylor University	Upland, Indiana	Active	
**Alpha-Rho-Alpha**		University of Arkansas–Fort Smith	Fort Smith, Arkansas	Active	
**Alpha-Rho-Beta**		Marian University	Indianapolis, Indiana	Active	
**Alpha-Rho-Gamma**	2020	Lubbock Christian University	Lubbock, Texas	Active	
**Alpha-Rho-Delta**		St. Ambrose University	Davenport, Iowa	Active	
**Alpha-Rho-Epsilon**		Anderson University	Anderson, South Carolina	Active	
**Alpha-Rho-Zeta**		National Chapter	Florida	Active	
**Alpha-Rho-Eta**	2022	University of Illinois Chicago	Chicago, Illinois	Active	
**Alpha-Rho-Theta**	2022	California State University, East Bay	Hayward, California	Active	
**Alpha-Rho-Iota**		Cornell College	Mount Vernon, Iowa	Active	
**Alpha-Rho-Kappa**	2025	Bentley University	Waltham, Massachusetts	Active	
**Alpha-Rho-Lambda**		University of Wisconsin–Superior	Superior, Wisconsin	Active	
**Alpha-Rho-Mu**	2025	Lawrence University	Appleton, Wisconsin	Active	
**Upsilon-Nu-Omega**		American Military University	Charles Town, West Virginia	Active	
		Kentucky Christian University	Grayson, Kentucky	Active	
