= I Live My Life =

1935 film by W. S. Van Dyke

- Theatrical release poster
- Directed by: W. S. Van Dyke
- Written by: Gottfried Reinhardt; Ethel Borden
- Screenplay by: Joseph L. Mankiewicz
- Based on: "Claustrophobia"; 1926 in Scribner's Magazine by Abbe Carter Goodloe
- Produced by: Bernard H. Hyman
- Starring: Joan Crawford; Brian Aherne; Frank Morgan; Aline MacMahon
- Cinematography: George J. Folsey; William H. Daniels (uncredited)
- Edited by: Tom Held
- Music by: Dimitri Tiomkin
- Production company: Metro-Goldwyn-Mayer
- Distributed by: Loew's Inc.
- Release date: October 4, 1935 (United States)
- Running time: 97 minutes
- Country: United States
- Language: English
- Budget: $586,000
- Box office: $1,478,000

I Live My Life is a 1935 American romantic comedy drama film directed by W.S. Van Dyke starring Joan Crawford, Brian Aherne and Frank Morgan. It is based on the story Claustrophobia by A. Carter Goodloe.

== Plot ==
Bored socialite Kay Bentley travels to Greece on her wealthy father's yacht. While on land, she meets and begins a romance with idealistic archaeologist Terry O'Neill, who challenges her beliefs. However, Kay is not serious about him and tells him that she is Ann Morrison, secretary to the man who is actually her father.

After Kay returns to New York, Terry travels there to resume their affair but Kay harshly rejects him. When Terry learns her true identity, he excoriates her and storms away. However, his message causes Kay to reconsider her opinion of him, and she attends his lecture in order to see him again. They continue to bicker regarding her elevated social status and circle of elitist friends.

When Kay learns that her father has lost his fortune, she plans to marry her original fiancé, a man whose wealth will permit her to continue her life of privilege. However, her father is able to rescue his financial situation and Kay agrees to marry Terry. Her father hires Terry as an executive, but he is quickly bored with the position and feels claustrophobic in his office. Terry yearns to return to Greece and resume his archaeological work, but Kay balks at the notion of abandoning her comfortable life in New York. However, she soon changes her mind and realizes that she wants to be with Terry wherever he wants to live.

== Cast ==
- Joan Crawford as Kay Bentley
- Brian Aherne as Terence "Terry" O'Neill
- Frank Morgan as G. P. Bentley
- Aline MacMahon as Betty Collins
- Eric Blore as Grove, Bentley's Butler
- Fred Keating as Gene Piper
- Jessie Ralph as Kay's Grandmother
- Arthur Treacher as Gallup, Mrs. Gage's Butler
- Frank Conroy as Doctor
- Etienne Girardot as Professor
- Esther Dale as Brumbaugh, Mrs. Gage's Housekeeper
- Hale Hamilton as Uncle Carl
- Hilda Vaughn as Miss Ann Morrison
- Frank Shields as Outer Office Secretary
- Sterling Holloway as Max

== Reception ==
Andre Sennwald of the The New York Times wrote that the film "proves to be an entertaining effort to show that love is really a pretty democratic emotion, although gowns by Adrian have their definite value in stimulating it." Sennwald admits to not being an admirer of Joan Crawford and comments, "I have always suffered from myopia when it came to Miss Crawford's glamorous contributions to cinema art, but this time the distinguished glitter girl enjoys the help of W. S. Van Dyke's lively production and some uncommonly hilarious actors." Discussing the performances, Sennwald wrote, "Miss Crawford is rather self-consciously adequate to the needs of her part and Mr. Aherne is excellent ... Frank Morgan ... is superbly comic ... Jessie Ralph proves again that she is the best of the screen grandmothers. The photoplay also possesses the two funniest butlers in Hollywood, Eric Blore and Arthur Treacher, and even allows them a bit of acrimonious rivalry in one scene."

Variety noted that the film possesses all the ingredients "for a conventional Joan Crawford picture". It continued, "Cast is studded with sturdy players who know their stuff and the reason for much of the merriment can be found in the supporting troupe. Brian Aherne is aces opposite Crawford. His flamboyant Irishman in this film is vigorous, colorful trouping. Crawford won’t disappoint from a sartorial angle. On performance she’s also as usual, but if her eyelashes continue getting any longer her leading men will have to start wearing bumpers."

Modern Screen gave the film a four-star review praising the direction of Van Dyke, and the performances given by Morgan and Aherne. It said that Crawford was given "an opportunity to use the dramatic talent she once showed such generous signs of possessing" and that it was "the best Crawford picture in several seasons."

== Box office ==
According to MGM records, the film earned $921,000 in the U.S. and Canada and $557,000 in other markets, resulting in a profit of $384,000.
