= Pioneer Valley Academy =

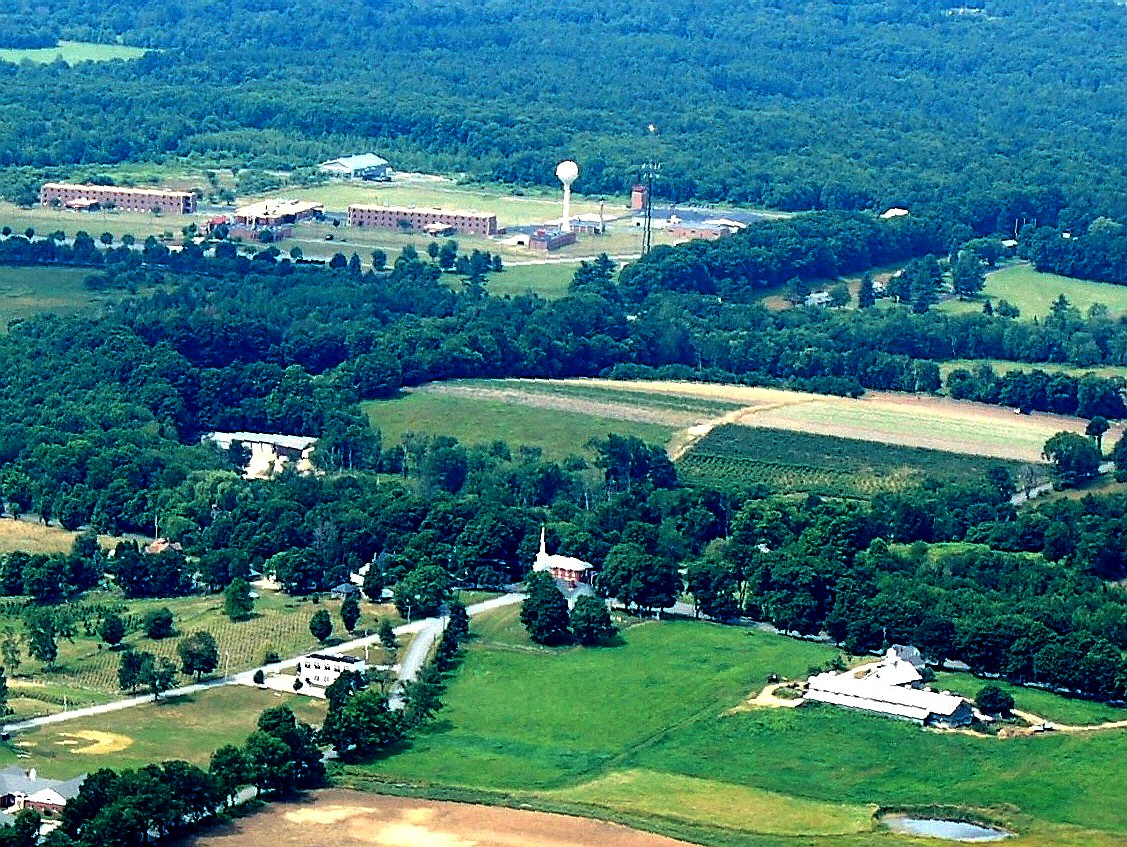
- Motto
- Type: Private Academy, Grades 9–12
- Active: 1965–1983
- Affiliations: Seventh-day Adventist Church
- Location: New Braintree, Massachusetts, USA
- Campus: Rural

Pioneer Valley Academy, located in New Braintree Massachusetts, opened its doors in September 1965 as a coed boarding school operated by the Southern New England Conference of Seventh-day Adventists. It educated hundreds of 9–12 students before its closing in June 1983. Pioneer Valley is now the police academy for the Massachusetts State Police.

== History ==
Former Southern New England Conference (SNEC) President Elder Merle L. Mills led the campaign to establish Pioneer Valley Academy. This began in 1958 when the Atlantic Union Conference asked SNEC to take over the SDA church's regional secondary educational boarding school responsibilities after the New England Accreditation of Schools and Colleges alerted the Atlantic Union College board that they'd not renew AUC's accreditation unless South Lancaster Academy and Atlantic Union College were separated. (SLA and AUC had occupied the same campus in South Lancaster, MA since AUC was established there in 1922).

The Conference endeavored to locate the academy in harmony with the counsel given by the Spirit of Prophecy of Ellen G. White. "It is a rural area away from the contaminating and deleterious influences of the city" stated Merle L. Mills, Southern New England Conference President.

The first phase of construction provided facilities for approximately 236 students at a cost of $3,000,000 in 1963 ($23,195,980 when adjusted for 2015 inflation). Provisions were also made to expand the facilities for up to 350 students. In the photo shown, one can see the school's former boys' and girls' dormitories (Ellis Hall and Mills Hall, respectively) with the cafeteria in between and the water tower to the right of the boys' dormitory, immediately next to the maintenance shop.

In late 1964, after just completing a $50,000 booster offering, the Southern New England Conference announced a "Million Penny Drive". Due to heavy expenditures that were not included in the original school construction budget and the decision to open the academy a year earlier than planned, an emergency round of fundraising was required. With hopes of raising $10,000, churches were encouraged to build "ingenious devices in which to gather your pennies". Unfortunately this fundraiser was done during a period when the U.S. Mint was experiencing a nationwide coin shortage.

With the opening of Pioneer Valley Academy in 1965, South Lancaster Academy was no longer used as the boarding school within the Southern New England Conference territory (technically, SLA was operated by the Atlantic Union Conference up until this time). SLA, along with another local secondary school within SNEC called Greater Boston Academy (GBA), were supposed to become ten grade schools (junior academies). Instead a new building erected next to AUC campus for SLA was continued as a twelve grade program. And GBA relocated from Newbury St. in Boston into a new facility on the SDA-owned New England Memorial Hospital grounds in Stoneham, MA and likewise continued operating as a twelve grade program. Neither SLA or GBA had dormitories and thus operated as local "day schools". PVA was the only conference-wide boarding school.

== Closure and sale ==
Opening enrollment for the school during its first year of operation totaled 233 students. However, by 1982, a strong recruitment program was planned with hopes of attracting only 100 students for 1983 school year.

Because of a SNEC politics and a drop in enrollment during the last year of operation in the 1982-83 school year, PVA ended the year with $150,000 ($363,000 when adjusted for 2013 inflation) in unpaid bills.

On September 29, 1983 The Southern New England conference committee voted to authorize the signing of a contract with Preview, Inc., a division of Coldwell Banker.

PVA was operated by the Southern New England Conference of SDAs from 1965 to 1983; it was closed in July 1983 and later sold in 1985 for approximately $2.5 million to wealthy Boston area developer Dr. Daniel Strair. The proceeds of PVA's sale were put into what has since become known as SNEC's "SET Fund" (Secondary Education Trust Fund), with most of the interest being used as conference-wide scholarships for SDA constituent youth attending any SDA academy, and the rest being added to the principle to offset inflationary erosion.

The 782 acre former PVA campus was obtained by the Commonwealth of Massachusetts in c1988, when Gov. Michael Dukakis tried to establish a new prison there. After a groundswell of grassroots opposition, Gov. William Weld, who had pledged to the people of New Braintree that he'd not make a prison out of PVA if he became governor, instead had the PVA campus converted into the new Massachusetts State Police Academy (Training Facility) in c1992, which it remains to this day.

The Massachusetts State Police still occupies the grounds and buildings as their training academy.
