= Nathaniel Thayer Estate =

Historic house in Massachusetts, United States

- U.S. National Register of Historic Places
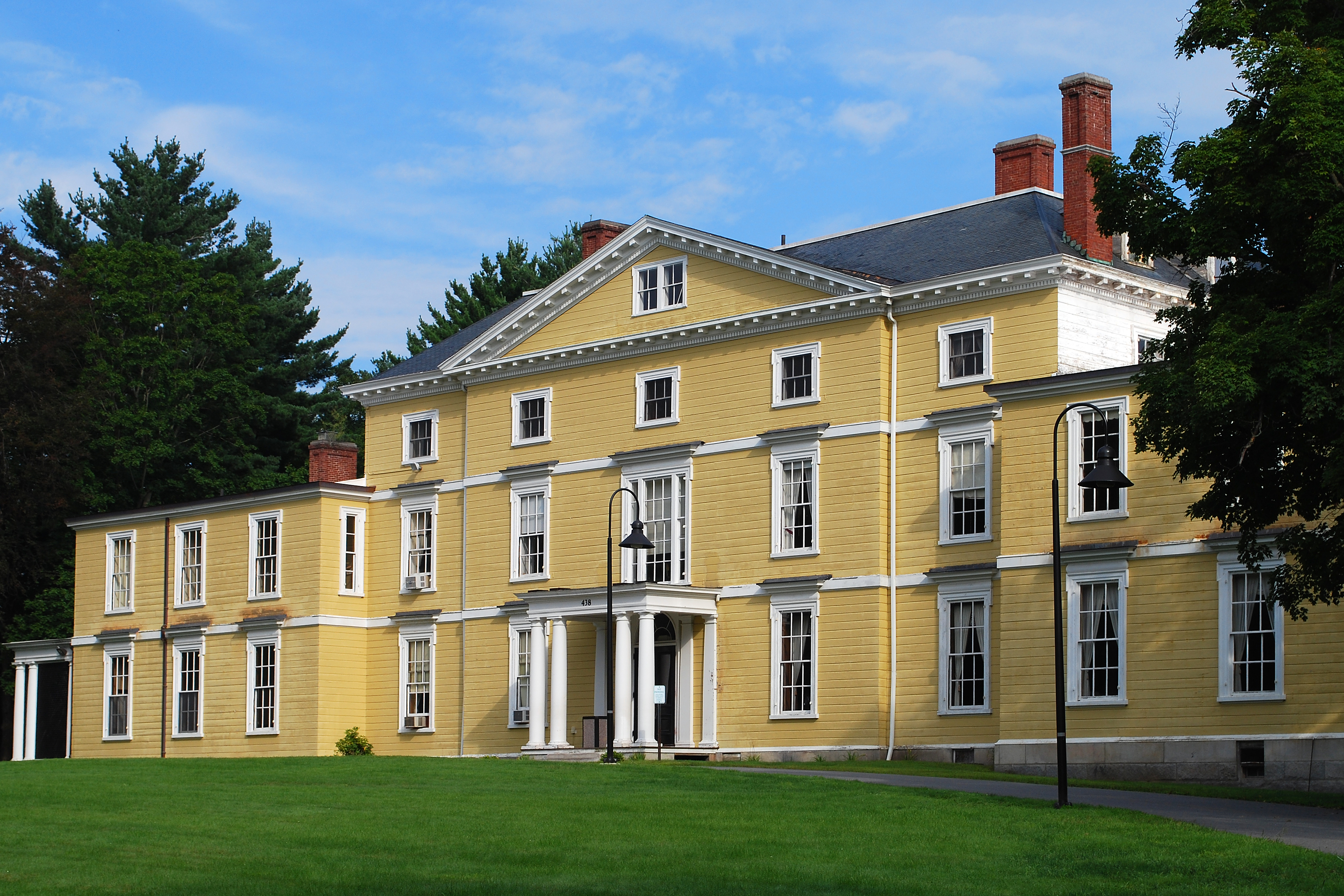

- Location within Massachusetts Location within the United States
- Location: 438 S. Main Street, Lancaster, Massachusetts
- Coordinates: 42°26′59″N 71°40′43″W
- Area: 25 acres (10 ha)
- Built: 1846; 1902 (remodeled)
- Architect: Ogden Codman Jr. (remodel)
- Architectural style: Colonial Revival
- NRHP reference No.: 76000302
- Added to NRHP: July 6, 1976

The Nathaniel Thayer Estate is a 21,802 sq ft (2,025.5 m^{2}) historic house in Lancaster, Massachusetts. Built in 1846 and extensively restyled in 1902, it is a particularly fine example of Georgian Revival architecture, and was added to the National Register of Historic Places in 1976. Since 1946, the estate has been owned by the Seventh-day Adventist Church, which operated Atlantic Union College there until its 2018 closure. The main house was home to Thayer Conservatory for several decades, bringing community together through music and the arts.

== Description and history ==
The Thayer Estate is located at the northern end of the former Atlantic Union College campus, roughly midway between the villages of South Lancaster and Lancaster on the west side of Massachusetts Route 70. It is a large wood-frame structure, with a central three-story block flanked by two-story wings that project forward of the main block's facade. The central block is five bays wide, and is covered by a truncated hip roof with modillioned cornice. The central three blocks project slightly, and are topped by a pedimented gable. The main entrance is at the center, sheltered by a flat-roof portico with paired Doric columns. The interior is richly decorated with marble and wood, and features a large drawing room (now a performance space) in one of the wings.

A house was built on the site in 1798 when Reverend Nathaniel Thayer (1769-1840) constructed his parsonage in South Lancaster. Thayer was the town's Congregationalist minister for 47 years. His son Nathaniel, who had made a fortune in business, took down the original home and developed the estate in 1846, building the core of the present house. It was enlarged and remodeled in 1902 by the architect and interior designer Ogden Codman Jr. to 42 rooms for Nathaniel Thayer III. After being sold out of the Thayer family and having its furnishings sold at auction, the house was sold to Atlantic Union College in 1943 at a cost of $12,500. It was used as the school's administration building between 1945 and 1951, and then as a dormitory until about 1970. From 1973 to 2021 the Nathaniel Thayer estate was home to Thayer Conservatory, Center for Music and the Arts. Thayer Conservatory is being run by the director Dr. Connie Rittenhouse Drexler.

== See also ==
- National Register of Historic Places listings in Worcester County, Massachusetts
