= Hart Goodloe =

American surgeon (1875–1954)

Hart Goodloe (January 31, 1875 – March 21, 1954) was a surgeon in the First World War who served at Saint-Mihiel and the Meuse-Argonne Offensive.

== Early life and education ==
Hart Goodloe was born in Danville, Kentucky in 1875. He is a graduate of University of Louisville's School of Medicine and a member of Phi Chi medical fraternity's Alpha Alpha-Gamma chapter serving as Grand Presiding Senior (President) of the Grand Chapter from 1900 to 1901.

== Army ==
On August 13, 1917, he enlisted in the U.S. Army at age 42. He was commissioned to the rank of major and was a surgeon in the army. By 1918 he was sent over to France and saw action at the Battle of Saint-Mihiel and Meuse-Argonne Offensive. He was discharged from service on March 18, 1919, and resided in St. Louis, Missouri. His war documents were destroyed in a fire at the St. Louis archives.

== Published works ==
In 2007 a novel titled "Goodloe - Blood Stains the Fury of the Coming Storm" by Patrick Bauer was published based on the life of Hart Goodloe. ISBN 978-1-4257-8225-2 (hardcover) ISBN 978-1-4257-8216-0 (softcover) available November 2007.

== Death ==
He died at Veterans Hospital, Biloxi, Mississippi, on March 21, 1954, at age 79.
