= Amy Goodloe =

- Born: 1967 or 1968 (age 58–59); Atlanta, Georgia
- Known for: Creating and maintaining web-based discussion spaces and resources geared toward lesbians
- Website: amygoodloe.com

Amy Goodloe is the creator of the websites Women Online and Lesbian.org, a non-profit organization focused on documenting activities and work by lesbians on the web. She also initiated and maintained mailing lists that served as online discussion spaces for LGBTQ communities. She was a professor of writing in the Women and Gender Studies department at the University of Colorado Boulder.

== Career ==
In the 1990s, Goodloe was responsible for starting and maintaining Usenet mailing lists for lesbians. She is considered to be a leading figure in creating online spaces that allowed lesbians to easily interact with each other. Goodloe has contended that participation in these spaces represents a form of activism.

By 1997, there were 46 e-mail lists available for lesbian audiences. Goodloe notes that many of these lists retained policies that restricted participation to women only, but discussion participants would frequently disagree over whether transgender or bisexual individuals should be included in these spaces. Goodloe created the website repository Lesbian.org between 1994 and 1995 to both provide a platform for lesbians and to demonstrate their increasing presence online. The website included resources such as literary journals, noticeboards, business listings, and information about art exhibitions featuring work by or about lesbians.
