= Goodloe, Virginia =

Unincorporated community in Virginia, United States

- Unincorporated community
- Location within Virginia Location within the United States
- Coordinates: 36°51′40″N 82°51′37″W
- Country: United States
- State: Virginia
- County: Lee
- Elevation: 2,162 ft (659 m)
- Time zone: UTC-5 (Eastern (EST))
  - Summer (DST): UTC-4 (EDT)
- GNIS feature ID: 1496520

Goodloe was an unincorporated community in Lee County, Virginia, United States.
