= Abbe Carter Goodloe =

American writer

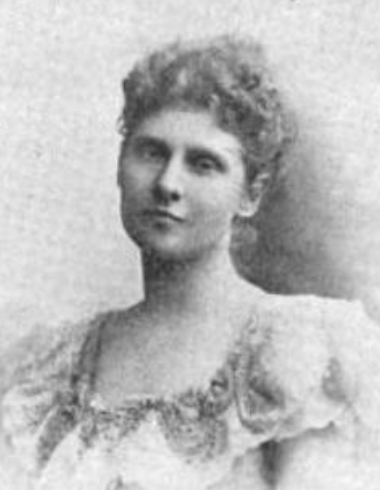
- Abbe Carter Goodloe, from a 1897 publication
- Born: Abbie Carter Goodloe; January 15, 1867; Versailles, Kentucky
- Died: October 8, 1960 (aged 93); New York, New York
- Other names: A. Carter Goodloe, Carter Goodloe
- Occupation: Writer
- Notable work: College Girls (1897)

Abbe (or Abbie) Carter Goodloe (January 15, 1867 – October 8, 1960) was an American writer, sometimes credited as A. Carter Goodloe or Carter Goodloe.

== Early life ==
College Girls by Abbe Carter Goodloe, illustrated by Charles Dana Gibson. LCCN2014650127

Abbie Carter was born in Versailles, Kentucky, the daughter of John Kemp Goodloe and Mary Lucretia Goodloe. Her mother was a clubwoman, and her father was a lawyer and a judge. She graduated from Wellesley College in 1898, and wrote the lyrics for two songs in the college songbook ("Mona Lisa" and "Le Pays du Tendre"). After college she went to France to improve her French language skills.

== Career ==
Goodloe was a writer who specialized in short stories, many of which were published in Scribner's Magazine. She also did translations for Scribner's. Books by Goodloe included Antinoüs: a tragedy (1891), College Girls (1895, a collection of her stories, illustrated by Charles Dana Gibson), Calvert of Strathore (1903, a novel), At the Foot of the Rockies (1905, more short stories), and The Star-Gazers (1910, a romance set in Mexico). Her style was described as "vivid", and "essentially clever and racy to a delightful degree", in an 1895 review. She also wrote plays. Her story "Claustrophobia" (Scribner's, 1926) won an O. Henry Award in 1927; it was made into a film titled I Live My Life (1935), starring Joan Crawford and Brian Aherne. Later in her career, she sold scenarios for television productions.

During World War I, she hosted fundraising events for war relief causes with the Wellesley Club of Kentucky.

== Personal life ==
Goodloe played golf. She died in 1960, aged 93 years, in New York City. Her stories are still anthologized in collections of American literature.
