= South Lancaster, Massachusetts =

- CDP
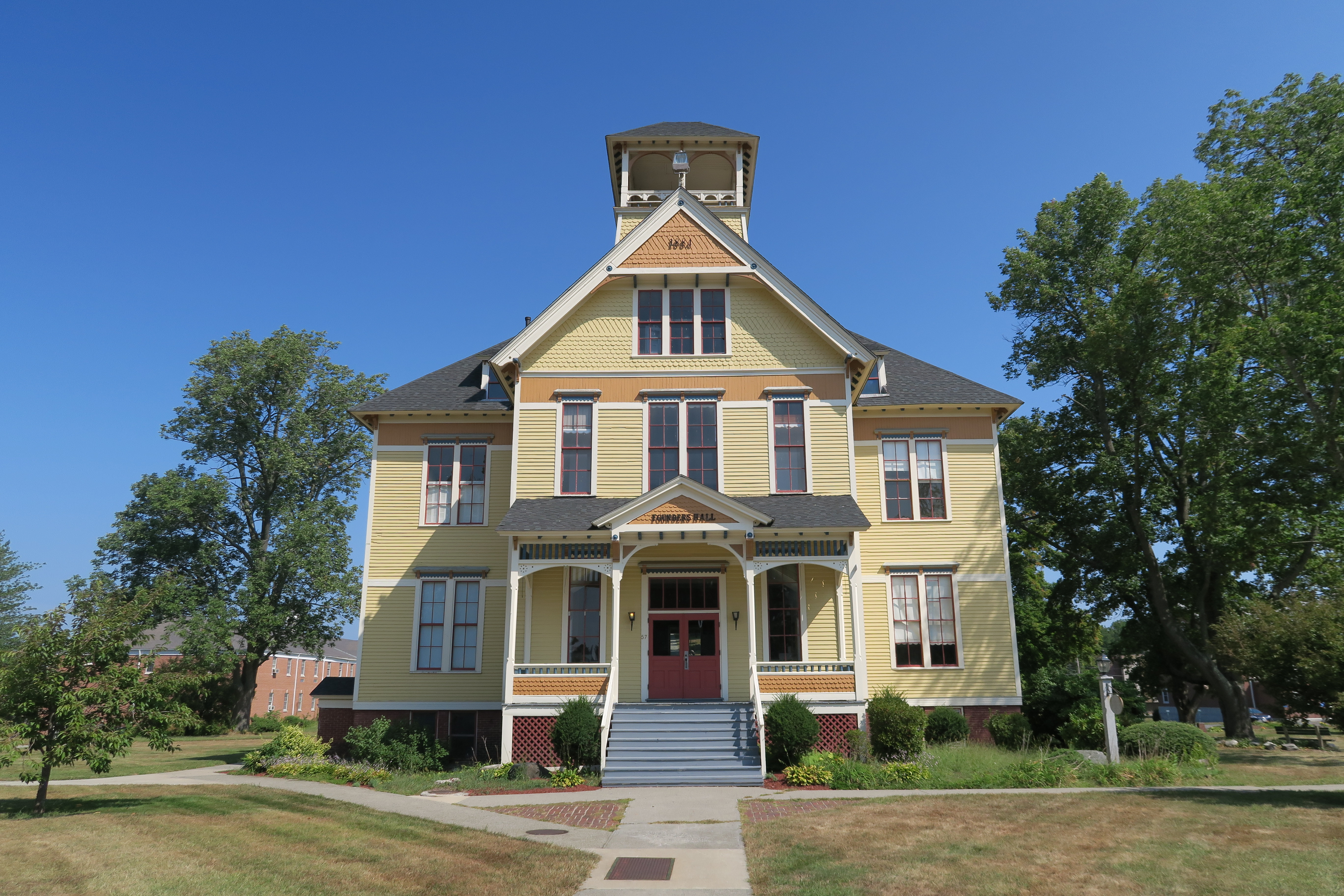
- Founders Hall, Atlantic Union College
- Nickname: North Clinton
- Location in Worcester County and the state of Massachusetts.
- Coordinates: 42°26′16″N 71°41′18″W
- Country: United States
- State: Massachusetts
- County: Worcester

Area
  - Total: 1.34 sq mi (3.47 km^{2})
  - Land: 1.33 sq mi (3.44 km^{2})
  - Water: 0.015 sq mi (0.04 km^{2})
- Elevation: 285 ft (87 m)

Population (2020)
  - Total: 1,642
  - Density: 1,385.7/sq mi (535.04/km^{2})
- Time zone: UTC-5 (Eastern (EST))
  - Summer (DST): UTC-4 (EDT)
- ZIP code: 01561
- Area code: 978
- FIPS code: 25-64460
- GNIS feature ID: 0610918

South Lancaster is a census-designated place (CDP) in the town of Lancaster and close to the Town of Clinton in Worcester County, Massachusetts, United States. The population was 1,642 at the 2020 census.

== Geography ==
South Lancaster is located at 42°26′16″N 71°41′18″W (42.437841, -71.688444).

According to the United States Census Bureau, the CDP has a total area of 3.4 km^{2} (1.3 mi^{2}), of which 3.4 km^{2} (1.3 mi^{2}) is land and 0.76% is water.

== Demographics ==
Historical population
| Census | Pop. | Note | %± |
|---|---|---|---|
| 2000 | 1,742 | | — |
| 2010 | 1,838 | | 5.5% |
| 2020 | 1,642 | | −10.7% |
U.S. Decennial Census

=== 2020 census ===
As of the 2020 census, South Lancaster had a population of 1,838. The median age was 42.6 years. 22.0% of residents were under the age of 18 and 18.3% of residents were 65 years of age or older. For every 100 females there were 91.3 males, and for every 100 females age 18 and over there were 86.1 males age 18 and over.

100.0% of residents lived in urban areas, while 0.0% lived in rural areas.

There were 735 households in South Lancaster, of which 31.8% had children under the age of 18 living in them. Of all households, 49.4% were married-couple households, 15.2% were households with a male householder and no spouse or partner present, and 28.7% were households with a female householder and no spouse or partner present. About 29.6% of all households were made up of individuals and 13.8% had someone living alone who was 65 years of age or older.

There were 799 housing units, of which 8.0% were vacant. The homeowner vacancy rate was 1.4% and the rental vacancy rate was 5.0%.

Racial composition as of the 2020 census
| Race | Number | Percent |
|---|---|---|
| White | 1,441 | 78.4% |
| Black or African American | 118 | 6.4% |
| American Indian and Alaska Native | 2 | 0.1% |
| Asian | 31 | 1.7% |
| Native Hawaiian and Other Pacific Islander | 0 | 0.0% |
| Some other race | 53 | 2.9% |
| Two or more races | 193 | 10.5% |
| Hispanic or Latino (of any race) | 176 | 9.6% |

=== 2000 census ===
As of the census of 2000, there were 1,742 people, 676 households, and 469 families residing in the CDP. The population density was 517.4/km^{2} (1,334.9/mi^{2}), amongst the lowest in the state. There were 695 housing units at an average density of 206.4/km^{2} (532.6/mi^{2}). The racial makeup of the CDP was 90.30% White, 6.43% African American, 0.06% Native American, 1.26% Asian, 1.49% from other races, and 0.46% from two or more races. Hispanic or Latino of any race were 5.45% of the population.

There were 676 households, out of which 32.7% had children under the age of 18 living with them, 57.0% were married couples living together, 8.7% had a female householder with no husband present, and 30.6% were non-families. 25.1% of all households were made up of individuals, and 14.5% had someone living alone who was 65 years of age or older. The average household size was 2.58 and the average family size was 3.11.

In the CDP, the population was spread out, with 24.9% under the age of 18, 6.6% from 18 to 24, 30.4% from 25 to 44, 24.2% from 45 to 64, and 14.0% who were 65 years of age or older. The median age was 39 years. For every 100 females, there were 93.6 males. For every 100 females age 18 and over, there were 84.6 males.

The median income for a household in the CDP was $48,750, and the median income for a family was $56,319. Males had a median income of $41,917 versus $31,429 for females. The per capita income for the CDP was $23,341. About 4.6% of families and 5.3% of the population were below the poverty line, including 1.9% of those under age 18 and 23.3% of those age 65 or over.

== Religion and education ==
A significant portion of life in the village centered around Atlantic Union College, a Seventh-day Adventist (SDA) institution of higher learning founded in 1882. The college was closed in 2018 after failing to rebuild after losing accreditation in 2011. The village is home to the Southern New England Conference of Seventh-day Adventists and the Atlantic Union Conference of Seventh-day Adventists, along with the SDA church owned South Lancaster Academy. The college music department was housed in the Nathaniel Thayer Estate, which was placed on the National Register of Historic Places in 1976 and was the Thayer Performing Arts Center until its closure in 2020.
