= Atlantic Union College =

Liberal arts college in South Lancaster, Massachusetts, US

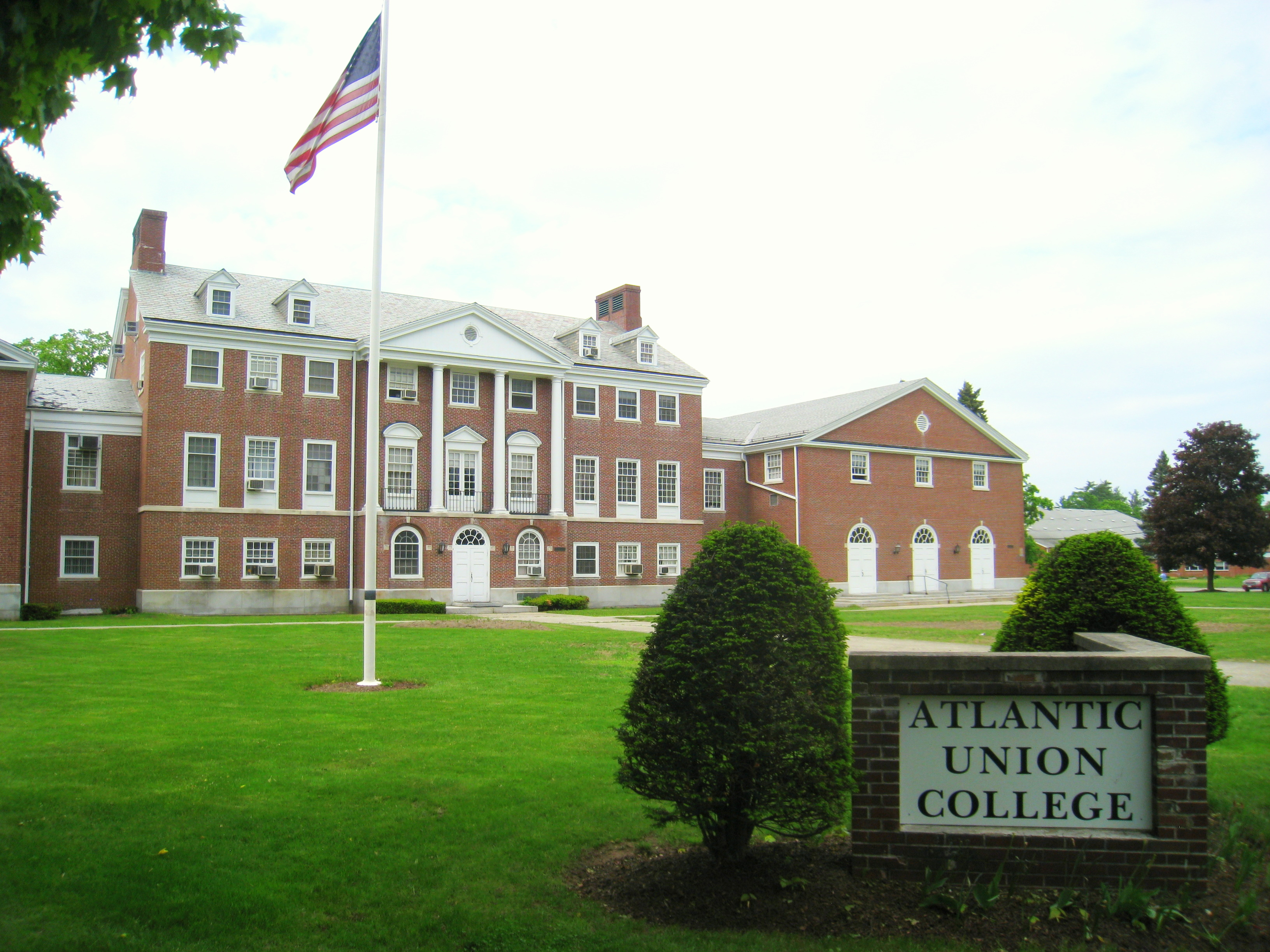
- Motto: Fiat Lux
- Motto in English: Let There Be Light
- Type: Private college
- Active: 1882 as a preparatory school, 1922 as a degree-granting college–2018
- Religious affiliation: Seventh-day Adventist Church
- Academic affiliations: COWC
- Location: South Lancaster, Massachusetts, US; 42°26′42.26″N 71°41′9.41″W
- Campus: Rural
- Website: auc.edu

Atlantic Union College (AUC) was a private Seventh-day Adventist college in South Lancaster, Massachusetts. It was founded in 1882. The college closed in 2018 due to accreditation and financial problems.

From 1933 to 2018, AUC was a four-year liberal arts college with a peak enrollment of over 700 students. After a financial crisis in 2011 it suspended bachelor's degree programs, then resumed them on a smaller scale in 2015. In February 2018, the college announced that it would permanently close after the spring 2018 semester. The campus was sold in 2021.

== History ==
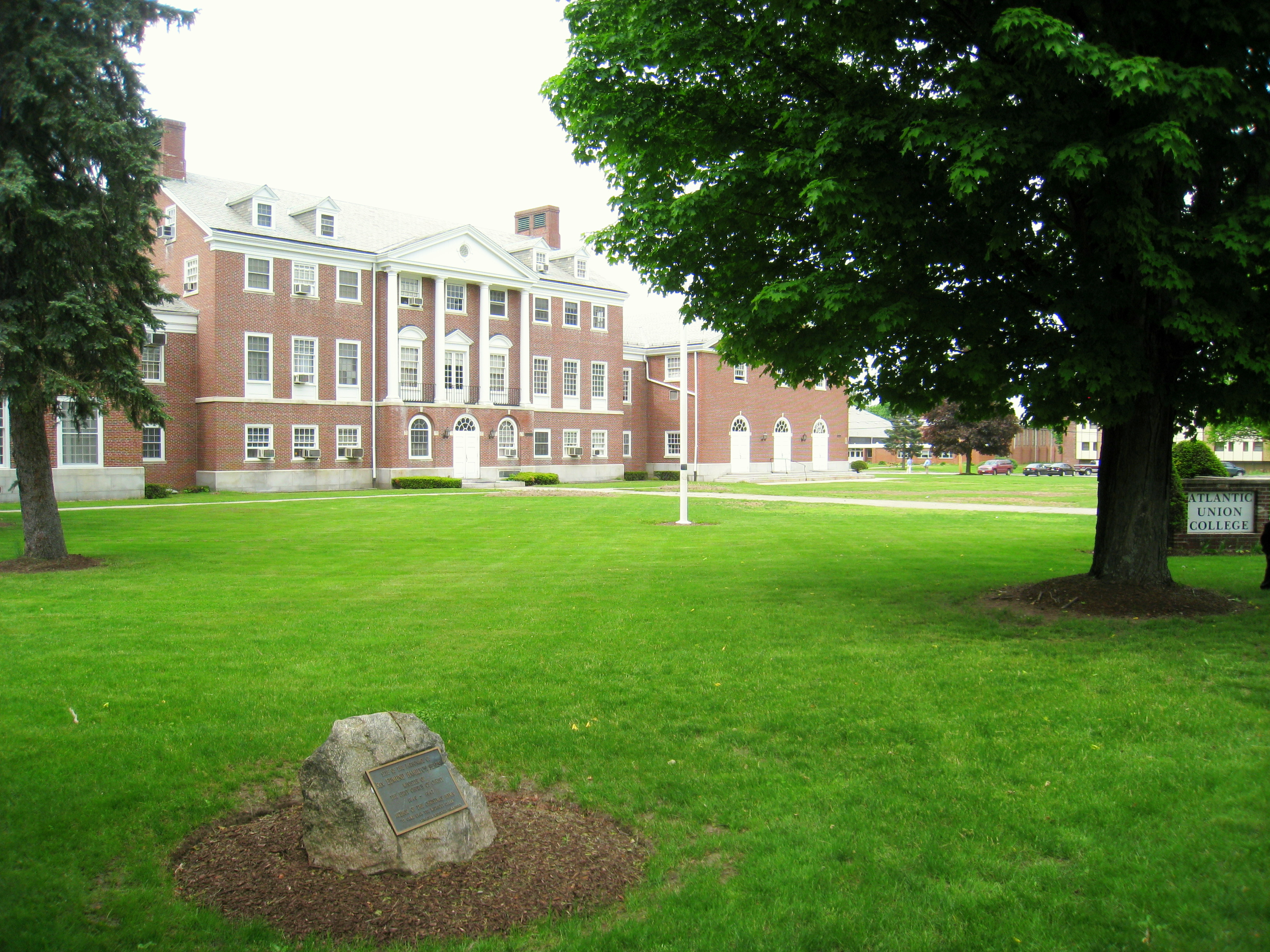
The plaque in the foreground reads: "Site of the Parsonage of Rev. Edmund Hamilton Sears, Minister of the First Church of Christ 1840–1847, Author of the Christmas Hymn 'It Came Upon a Midnight Clear'. Lancaster Historical Commission"

=== Origins ===
Founded in 1882, Atlantic Union College in South Lancaster, Mass. is the oldest campus in the Seventh-day Adventist worldwide educational system. In 1882, the school was organized as a preparatory school under the leadership of Adventist 'pioneer' Stephen Nelson Haskell to serve the needs of Adventist constituents in the northeastern part of the United States and Bermuda, and was named "That New England School". The next year, it was incorporated and renamed South Lancaster Academy. In 1918, it was renamed: Lancaster Junior College. Then, in 1922, it was yet again renamed Atlantic Union College after being authorized to grant degrees in the state of Massachusetts. That year, the academy and college separated. In 1933, Governor Joseph Ely granted AUC the right to confer the Bachelor of Arts degree. In 1945, the school was first accredited by the New England Association of Schools and Colleges (NEASC). In 1954, it was authorized to grant the Bachelor of Science degree. Herbert E. Douglass was president from 1967 to 1970. In 1990, Atlantic Union College was authorized to grant the Master of Education degree.

=== Lengthy legal & financial struggles ===
In October 1997, Bruce Wells, AUC's Dean, appointed by President Lashley, precipitated criticism for approaching selectmen in the neighboring town of Clinton for permission to use a Clinton address to sell used cars out of the college's parking lot in Lancaster. Six years later, Sylvan Lashley, left the college. There was an investigation by the U.S. Department of Education studied Title IV student aid funds, on which the vast majority of the college's 500 students were dependent at that time.

In 1993, with 82% of enrolled students receiving financial aid, there was a high default rate on student loans and enrollment was dropping well below projections. An auditor's report had shown the college was "essentially bankrupt" and at the time was at least $3 million in debt. By the Fall of 1994, another enrollment drop forced them to borrow $2 million to get through the 94–95 school year; a violation of North American Division working policy to borrow money for operating purposes. In May 1995, the AUC had $6.2 million in debt. Approximately $3 million was owed to the Atlantic Union Revolving Fund and $2.4 million owed to the General Conference. By August 1995, AUC met their first cash crunch and were forced to dip into the endowment funds to meet payroll. This process was repeated in November and December of the same year until the endowment funds were exhausted.

In 1998, the New England Association of Schools and Colleges issued 28 citations to Atlantic Union after an on-site visit. Most pertained to problems with finances, fund raising, the curriculum, student services, and faculty pay.

After a focused evaluation in 2001, the Massachusetts Commission on Institutions of Higher Education recommended to the board of trustees for NEASC that the college's accreditation be terminated. In December 2003, the Board of Trustees placed the college on probation.

In 2008, NEASC placed the college on probation status due to "failure to meet [its] Standard on Financial Resources". In February 2011, it was announced that Atlantic Union College would lose its accreditation on July 31, 2011.

The AUC board of trustees undertook negotiations with Washington Adventist University with the aim of establishing a branch campus of WAU on AUC's former campus. However. AUC President Norman Wendth announced in July that the plan had not gained approval from the Massachusetts Department of Education in time for the Fall 2011 school term. All 179 faculty and staff at AUC were laid off on July 31, 2011. Only one of the 450 enrolled students failed to find a new college in time for the fall semester, while all nursing students transferred to Mount Wachusett Community College in Gardner, Massachusetts. Adult degree program and distance learning students were not affected and automatically became students of Washington Adventist University.

In October 2011 the AUC board of trustees voted to suspend any further negotiations for a branch of WAU after the institutions were unable to reach an operating agreement.

=== Temporary restart ===
After 2011 some non-degree educational activities continued at Atlantic Union College. Performing arts instruction continued at the Thayer Performing Arts Center, and a certificate program in evangelism was instituted in 2013, the Northeast Evangelism Training School. Following a site visit by the Massachusetts Department of Higher Education (DHE) and the appointment of a new interim president late in 2012, the college won approval by the Massachusetts Board of Higher Education to offer two degrees beginning in 2013.

The college also began pursuing non-degree educational program. In 2013 it became the home of the Northeast Evangelism Training School. The following year, the college began offering three non-higher education programs.

In November 2014 Dr. Avis D. Hendrickson was appointed president of the college, the first woman to hold that post, and as it turned out the college's final president.

=== Final closure ===
Despite the new programs launched by the college, it continued to experience severe financial struggles. After receiving a report from an independent task force, the college's governing board voted in February 2018 to close the college. Degree programs closed at the end of the spring semester and certificate programs closed at the end of the summer.

The campus was sold in 2021.

== Campus ==
Atlantic Union College was located on 135-acres in Lancaster Massachusetts.

Founders Hall	Description
Atlantic Union College - Founder's Hall	The Gothic style/Queen Anne style hall was constructed in 1883/1884 under the direction of Stephen N. Haskell and foreman Chapin Henry Harris. It was added to the National Register of Historic Places in 1980.
Stephan H. Haskell Hall	Description
Haskell Hall	Haskell Hall was used as administration offices and classrooms, with the attached Machlan Auditorium. Plans for the building had been developed since 1938, but due to World War II, the shortage of materials prevented the building to be completed until 1952.
Preston Hall	Description
Picture Not Yet Available	Preston Hall was the women's dormitory. Construction began in 1939 and was completed in 1943. Two wing additions were added in 1963 and 1967. The building housed 240 women. The building was named after Rachel Oakes Preston, a Seventh-day Baptist in Washington, New Hampshire.
Lenheim Hall	Description
	Lenheim Hall had been the men's dormitory since it was completed in 1956. Unusual building techniques were used—entire floors were cast in concrete as one unit and then jacked up to their proper height and fastened to their vertical pillars. One floor unexpectedly collapsed and caused an expensive and timely setback. It was named in honor of Louis E. Lenheim, who was at the time the president of Atlantic Union Conference. Lenheim Hall can house 180 men. AUC's swimming pool is also in the basement.
Chan Shun Dining Commons	Description
	Chan Shun Dining Commons was the primary cafeteria used by students and faculty. It was built in 1995 largely through the generosity of the Chinese philanthropist Chan Shun. The main dining area had seating for 300.
Thayer Hall	Description
Thayer music building	Latterly known as the Thayer Performing Arts Center. The Nathaniel Thayer Estate mansion was purchased by the college in 1944. The mansion became known as Thayer Hall, and had housed the college administration building and library. South Lancaster Academy used it for a boys' dormitory for some years until Pioneer Valley Academy became the boarding academy for the conference. In 1972, the college moved the music department from Founder's Hall to Thayer, making it a music conservatory. A number of ensembles and orchestras, including the Atlantic Wind Symphony and the Youth Ensemble of New England, were based at Thayer Conservatory.
The G. Eric Jones Library	Description
	The G. Eric Jones Library was built in 1970.
W. G. Nelson Field House	Description
	The W. G. Nelson Field House was home to the athletic facilities and Physical Education department. Athletic fields for football and soccer were behind the center.

== Racial & ethnic profile ==
Atlantic Union College, coeducational since its founding, long served the full range of ethnicities of Seventh-day Adventists. While racial and ethnic proportions varied, during the college's last year of operation in 2011, ethnicity of the student body was 65.7% Black or African American, 16.7% Hispanic/Latino, 6.9% White, 5.9% Asian, 3.9% Race and/or ethnicity unknown and 1.0% Two or more races non-Hispanic/Latino.

During the 1990s, the administration of Dr. Sylvan Lashley was accused of infractions from racial discrimination to mishandling of student aid funds, which resulted in a federal investigation. In 2003 a former employee filed a complaint with the Massachusetts Commission on Discrimination, charging President Sylvan Lashley and assistant Dwight Carnegie with reverse discrimination.

In 2015, the AUC Board of Trustees created a "Reconciliation and Unity" committee to address the lingering effects of past tensions, both social and personal, approving a Resolution on Reconciliation and Unity.

== See also ==
- List of Seventh-day Adventist colleges and universities
- List of Seventh-day Adventist hospitals
- List of Seventh-day Adventist medical schools
- List of Seventh-day Adventist secondary schools
- Seventh-day Adventist education
- Seventh-day Adventist Church
- Seventh-day Adventist theology
- Adventist Colleges and Universities
- Christian school
- History of the Seventh-day Adventist Church
