= Goodloe Harper Bell =

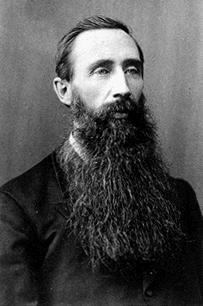
- Goodloe Harper Bell

Personal details
- Born: April 7, 1832 Watertown, New York
- Died: January 17, 1899 (aged 66) (age 66) Battle Creek, Michigan
- Occupation: Teacher, Author and Founder of the Seventh-day Adventist school system

Goodloe Harper Bell (April 7, 1832 – January 17, 1899), born to David and Lucy Bell, was the first teacher at the first Seventh-day Adventist school and co-founder of the Seventh-day Adventist school system. This first school was located on the first floor of the old Review and Herald building in Battle Creek, Michigan. Bell and his family lived on the second floor.

An original portrait of G. H. Bell resides at the Andrews University Museum. It was donated by Dr. Lavan C. and Junette Mapes.

Some of his early students include Edson and Willie White, sons of James and Ellen G. White. Ellen White was a great supporter and influence to G. H. Bell. Others included in the roster of his early students are two notable brothers, William K. Kellogg and John Harvey Kellogg.

== Genealogical information ==
Bell was the eldest of ten children born to David and Lucy Bell née Blodgett. Bell's sister Florilla and her husband Charles Miller are the great-grandparents of Burt Reynolds.

== Textbooks by Bell ==
- Bell's Language Series - Circa. 1896
  - Book 1/Primary Language Lessons
  - Book 2/Elementary Grammar
  - Book 3/Complete Grammar
  - Book 4/Rhetoric, Higher English
  - Book 5/Studies in English Lit
- Bible Lessons for the Sabbath School vol. 1 to 8 - Circa. 1887
- Progressive Bible Lessons for Children - Circa. 1872

== See also ==
- Seventh-day Adventist Church
- History of the Seventh-day Adventist Church
- Andrews University
