= List of people from Danville, Kentucky =

These noted people were born, raised or lived for a significant period of time in the city of Danville, Kentucky.

Name		Noted for
Michael F. Adams	b. 1948	President of the University of Georgia
Mary Hunt Affleck	1847–1932	American agrarian poet from Texas and a Confederate advocate
Sophia Alcorn	1883–1967	Educator; invented the Tadoma method of communication with people who are deaf and blind
William Anderson	1826–1861	U.S. Representative from Kentucky
Joshua Fry Bell	1811–1870	U.S. Representative, Kentucky Secretary of State; namesake of Bell County, Kentucky
James G. Birney	1792–1857	Abolitionist, politician and jurist
James M. Birney	1817–1888	Publisher and U.S. Ambassador to the Netherlands
William Birney	1819–1907	Professor, Union Army general during the American Civil War, attorney and author
Jeremiah Boyle	1818–1871	Lawyer, abolitionist, and brigadier general during the American Civil War
John Boyle	1774–1834	U.S. federal judge and U.S. Representative; namesake of Boyle County, Kentucky
John C. Breckinridge	1821–1875	U.S. Representative and U.S. Senator from Kentucky, Vice President of the United States, U.S. presidential candidate, Confederate States Secretary of War
Robert Breckinridge	1800–1871	Kentucky politician and Presbyterian minister
Neal Brown	b. 1980	College football coach and former player
Samuel D. Burchard	1812–1891	Clergyman
Michael Burns	b. 1947	Historian and actor
Jewel Carmen	1897–1984	Silent film actress
William Chrisman	1822–1897	Businessman and banker
James Clemens, Jr.	1791–1878	Businessman and banker
George B. Crittenden	1812–1880	Career Army officer who served in the Black Hawk War, the Army of the Republic of Texas, the Mexican–American War, and the Confederate States Army in the American Civil War
Joseph Daveiss	1774–1811	Lawyer and soldier
Todd Duncan	1903–1998	Baritone opera singer and actor
Milton J. Durham	1824–1911	Representative from Kentucky
Monroe Edwards	1808–1847	Slave trader, forger, swindler
John Fetterman	1920–1975	Pulitzer Prize-winning reporter
John Baptiste Ford	1811–1903	Industrialist and founder of the Pittsburgh Plate Glass Company
Harry Frankel	1888–1948	Minstrel performer and vaudevillian, "Singin' Sam, the Barbasol Man"
Helen Fisher Frye	1918–2014	Educator and civil rights activist
Speed S. Fry	1817–1892	Lawyer, judge, and U.S. Army officer during the Mexican–American War and American Civil War
William Arthur Ganfield	1873–1940	Educator
Alfred Goodrich Garr	1875–1944	Pentecostal Evangelist
Jordan Gay	b. 1990	American football player
Hart Goodloe	1875–1954	Surgeon in the First World War
Ashley Gorley	b. 1969	Songwriter and producer
Lewis W. Green	1806–1863	Presbyterian minister and educator
Willis Green	1818–1893	U.s. Representative
Christopher Greenup	1750–1818	U.S. Representative and Governor of Kentucky
Viola Rowe Gross	1921–2012	Teacher, businesswoman, clubwoman, and author
Aaron Harding	1805–1875	U.S. Representative from Kentucky
John Marshall Harlan	1833–1911	U.S. Supreme Court Justice, "The Great Dissenter"
Larnelle Harris	b. 1947	Gospel singer, songwriter and recording artist
Harvey Helm	1865–1919	U.S. Representative from Kentucky
Robby Henson	b. 1958	Film director and screenwriter
William R. Higgins	1945–1990	U.S. Marine Corps colonel captured and killed in 1988 while on a UN peacekeeping mission in Lebanon.
Edward W. Hoch	1849–1925	Governor of Kansas
Jesse Lynch Holman	1784–1842	Indiana lawyer, politician, jurist, novelist, poet, city planner, and preacher
Dennis Johnson	b. 1979	Football player
Elizabeth Topham Kennan	b. 1938	Academic, president of Mount Holyoke College
James Kerr	1790–1850	Politician in Missouri and Texas who was active in establishing the Republic of Texas
John Kincaid	1791–1873	U.S. Representative from Kentucky
J. Proctor Knott	1830–1911	U.S. Representative from Kentucky and Governor of Kentucky
Travis Leffew	b. 1983	Football player
Robert P. Letcher	1788–1861	U.S. Representative, diplomat, and Governor of Kentucky
Pierce Lively	1921–2016	U.S. federal judge
James Logan	1791–1859	Arkansas pioneer
Susan Shelby Magoffin	1827–1855	Diarist
Sara Mahan	1870–1966	Progressive era social reformer, early Democratic Party member
Maurice Manning	b. 1966	Poet
Jim Marshall	b. 1937	Football player
Claude Matthews	1845–1898	Governor of Indiana
Charles McDowell, Jr.	1926–2010	Political writer and television panelist
Ephraim McDowell	1771–1830	Physician, first to successfully remove an ovarian tumor
Samuel McDowell	1735–1817	Soldier and early political leader in Kentucky
John Gaines Miller	1812–1856	U.S. Representative from Missouri
E. Belle Jackson	1848–1942	Educator and abolitionist
Eddie Montgomery	b. 1963	Country music artist
John Michael Montgomery	b. 1965	Country music artist
Lottie Moon	1840–1912	Missionary to China
John Norvell	1789–1850	Newspaper editor and U.S. Senator from Michigan
Theodore O'Hara	1820–1867	Poet and soldier
William Owsley	1782–1862	Associate justice of the Kentucky Court of Appeals; Governor of Kentucky
Don Phelps	1924–1982	Professional American football player
Stephen Rolfe Powell	1951–2019	Glass artist
Scott Pruitt	b. 1968	Oklahoma Attorney General
James E. Rogers Jr.	1947–2018	President and CEO of Duke Energy
Joe Rue	1898–1984	Major League Baseball umpire
Willis Russell	1803–1852	Emancipated slave of Revolutionary War veteran Robert Craddock, founder of first school in Danville for African-American children
Alfred Ryors	1812–1858	President of Indiana University, Ohio University; professor at Centre College
Hugh L. Scott	1853–1934	Superintendent of West Point, Chief of Staff of the U.S. Army in World War I
Julia Green Scott	1839–1923	philanthropist, socialite, and businesswoman who served as President-General of the Daughters of the American Revolution
Isaac Shelby	1750–1826	First and fifth Governor of Kentucky
Jonathan Shell	b. 1987	Kentucky politician
Thomas A. Spragens	1917–2006	Educator, president of Centre College
King Swope	1893–1961	U.S. Representative from Kentucky
Albert G. Talbott	1808–1887	Kentucky politician
John G. Talbot	1844–1870	U.S. Navy officer
Albert G. Talbott	1808–1887	U.S. Representative from Kentucky
Jacob Tamme	b. 1985	Football player
Josh Teater	b. 1979	Professional golfer
Charles Stewart Todd	1791–1871	U.S. Army officer and U.S. Ambassador to Russia
Thomas Todd	1765–1826	U.S. Supreme Court Justice
Trey D.		Songwriter and composer, born Keith McGuffey
Frank X Walker	b. 1961	Kentucky's first African-American Poet Laureate
Margaret Anderson Watts	1832–1905	first Kentucky woman who wrote and advocated the equal rights of woman before the law
DeWitt Weaver	1939–2021	Professional golfer
Reed N. Weisiger	1838–1908	Texas State Senator, Confederate cavalry officer
Fess Williams	1894–1975	Jazz musician
Frances Harriet Williams	1898–1992	author, presidential advisor, activist, organizer for the National Association for the Advancement of Colored People and the YWCA
Phil Woolpert	1915–1987	College basketball coach
Craig Yeast	b. 1976	American and Canadian football player
John C. Young	1803–1857	Fourth president of Centre College

== See also ==
- List of people from Kentucky
