= Boyle County High School =

Location
- 1637 Perryville Rd. Danville, Boyle County, Kentucky 40422; United States; 37°38′34″N 84°46′40″W

Information
- School type: Public high school Public County School
- Established: 1963; 63 years ago
- School district: Boyle County Schools
- Superintendent: Mark Wade
- CEEB code: 180643
- Principal: David Christopher
- Teaching staff: 50.67 (FTE)
- Grades: 9–12
- Gender: Coeducational
- Enrollment: 869 (2024–2025)
- Student to teacher ratio: 17.15
- Campus type: Town
- Colors: Black & Vegas Gold
- Mascot: Rebels
- Nickname: Rebels / Lady Rebels
- Rivals: Danville Admirals; Lincoln County Patriots
- Newspaper: Big Rebel Nation News
- Feeder schools: Boyle County Middle School
- Website: bchs.boyle.kyschools.us

Boyle County High School is a public high school located in Danville, Kentucky, United States. It serves nearly 900 students in grades 9–12. The school opened to students in the 1963–1964 school year. The school was created to merge Perryville, Forkland, Junction City, and Parksville students into one school. Students came from four county schools that served grades 1–12 in the same building. Additionally, eighth graders from East End Elementary (grades 1–8) became part of the new high school.

== Students ==
Enrollment by Race/Ethnicity
American Indian / Alaska Native	Asian	Black	Hispanic	Native Hawaiian / Pacific Islander	White	Two or More Races
0.1%	1.6%	1.6%	2.7%	0	92.2%	1.7%

The makeup of the student body is 53.1% male and 46.9% female. 43.7% of students are eligible for the free or reduced-price lunch program. The student-teacher ratio is 16:1.

Boyle County was ranked top 15 among the 2017–18 Kentucky Department of Education student assessment at grade levels for students’ math and reading scores. It has been ranked among the top 50 in the state for “transition readiness” from middle school to college. It was ranked in the top 40 high schools for its “graduation rate” scores. It also excelled in ACT scores and advanced AP courses. The high school averaged a composite ACT score of 22 and 19 percent of the senior class scored a 28 or higher.

== Activities ==
Boyle County competes in the several interscholastic sports as the Rebels (boys) and Lady Rebels (girls). The school has rivalries with neighboring schools Danville High School and Lincoln County High School.

=== Football ===
Football history
Chuck Smith (1992–2004)
Year	Overall	District
1992	7–4	–
1993	2–8	–
1994	9–4	–
1995	10–3	–
1996	11–3	–
1997	11–1	–
1998	7–5	–
1999	(15–0)	–
2000	(15–0)	–
2001	(15–0)	–
2002	(13–2)	–
2003	(15–0)	–
2004	12–3	5–0
Chris Pardue (2005–2007)
2005	11–2	5–0
2006	6–6	4–1
2007	5–7	2–1
Larry French (2008–2013)
2008	13–1	3–0
2009	(15–0)	3–0
2010	(15–0)	3–0
2011	9–4	2–1
2012	7–5	2–1
2013	11–1	4–0
Chuck Smith (2014–2019)
2014	11–2	3–1
2015	10–2	2–1
2016	7–5	2–1
2017	(14–1)	3–0
2018	13–1	3–0
2019	14–1	3–0
Justin Haddix (2020–present)
2020	(11–0)	3–0
2021	(14–1)	3–0
2022	(13–2)	2–1
2023	(15–0)	4–0
2024	12–1	4–0
2025	(14–1)	4–0
State championship =

Boyle County has been Kentucky High School Athletic Association State Champion in football thirteen times. In 2009, Boyle County won their sixth title by rallying from a 22–7 to beat Lone Oak 42–39 in double overtime.

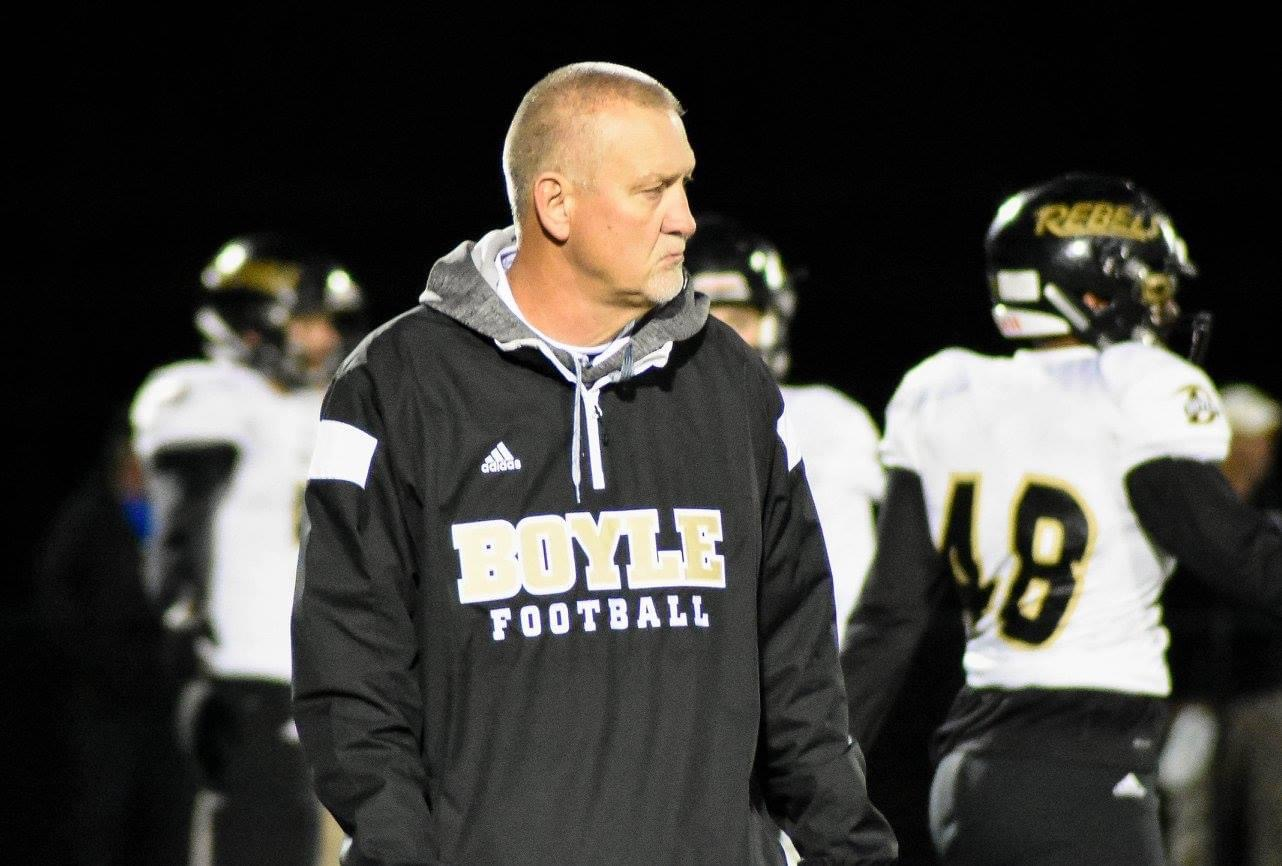
Under Chuck Smith's first stint at head coach, Boyle County won five straight championships from 1999 to 2004.

The 2017 championship was their first since 2010; they won 40–21 over Corbin. They were state runner-up in 2004 with a 13–2 record and then lost 22–6 to Highlands. From 2014 to 2019, their head coach was Chuck Smith. He was rehired after being Boyle County's head coach from 1992 to 2004. The team was also coached by Larry French; he started in 2008 and left for Southwestern High School in 2013. ShaDon Brown, recently hired as safeties coach for the Louisville Cardinals, served as an assistant coach for the team's 2007 season. In 2020, Justin Haddix was named the thirteenth head coach in program history. He has led the Rebels to five state championships in the past six seasons, and has amassed a 79–5 record since being hired.

=== Boys soccer ===
State tournament
Year	Finish
2003	Sweet 16
2005	Elite 8
2008	Elite 8
2014	Sweet 16
2020	Elite 8

=== Boys basketball ===
State tournament
Year	Finish
1998	Sweet 16
1999	Sweet 16
2006	Sweet 16
2015	Final 4
2021	Elite 8

=== Marching band ===
Under the direction of Tim Blevins, Boyle County has produced three state championship marching bands. The Marching Rebels were crowned the Kentucky Music Educators Association (KMEA) Class A State Champions in 2001, 2002, and 2003. KMEA classes are assigned based on enrollment at participating high school. The Marching Rebels were state finalists in 1996, 2004 (A), 2005 (AAA), 2006 (AAA), 2007 (AAA), 2008 (AAAA), 2009 (AAA), and 2010 (AAA).

=== Academic team ===
Boyle County High School
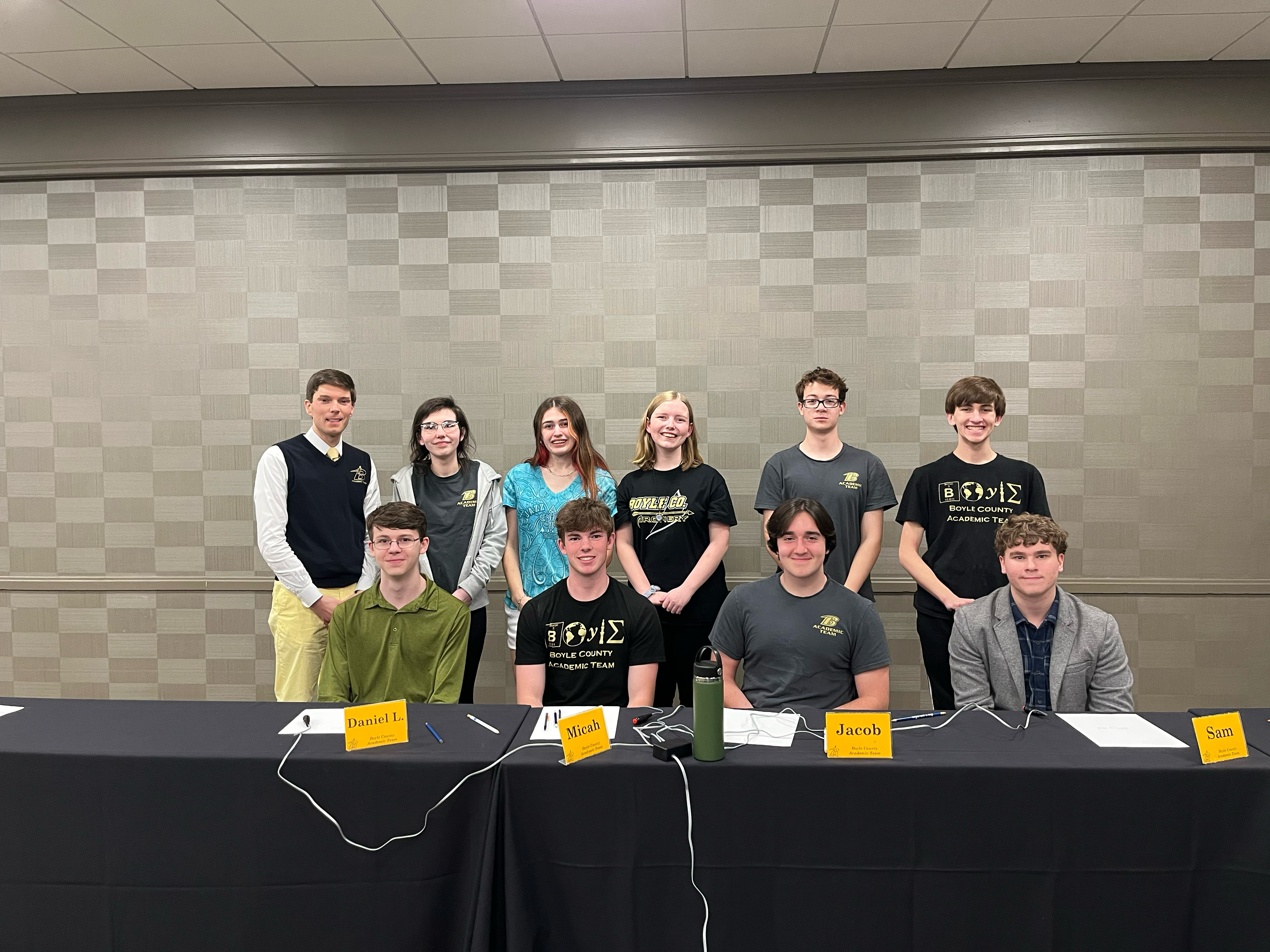
- 2025 Smart 16 team
- Head coach: Tyler Murphy

Governor's Cup Championships
- District Championships: 1986, 1987, 1988,1992, 1993, 1994, 1998, 2000, 2001, 2015, 2023, 2024, 2025, 2026
- Region Championships: 1988, 1998, 2014, 2024, 2025, 2026
- State Championships

Quick Recall Titles
- District Titles: 1992, 1993, 1994, 1995, 1998, 2000, 2024, 2025, 2026
- Region Titles: 2024, 2025, 2026
- State Smart 16: 2025, 2026

FPS Titles
- District Titles: 1993, 1994, 1997, 1999, 2000, 2001, 2002, 2003, 2015, 2016, 2017, 2018, 2019, 2020, 2023, 2024, 2025, 2026
- Region Titles: 2023, 2024, 2025, 2026

In 2025, the head coach of the Boyle County Middle School academic team, Tyler Murphy, also assumed the coaching responsibilities of the Boyle County High School academic team. Under Murphy, the team won two overall regional championships and two Quick Recall regional championships. The previous head coach had also secured a regional title, resulting in the program doubling its number of overall regional championships over a three-year period. The team made it the Smart 16 in both 2025 and 2026.

== Notable alumni ==
- Neal Brown – head football coach, University of North Texas; former offensive coordinator at Texas Tech and Kentucky; former head coach, West Virginia University.
- Travis Leffew – University of Louisville player, professional football player, and former Lincoln County head coach.
- Jacob Tamme – Indianapolis Colts, Denver Broncos, and Atlanta Falcons football player.
