= Kentucky College for Women =

Women's college in Danville, Kentucky (1860–1930)

- Former names: Caldwell Institute for Young Ladies (1860–1876); Caldwell Female College (1876–1887); Caldwell College (1887–1913)
- Type: Private women's
- Active: September 1860–1930
- Location: Danville, Kentucky, United States
- Nickname: Wahpanoochis

Kentucky College for Women, also known as Caldwell College, was a non-profit private women's college and preparatory school in Danville, Kentucky. It opened as the Caldwell Institute for Young Ladies in 1860. It merged with Centre College in 1930.

== History ==
=== Caldwell Institute ===
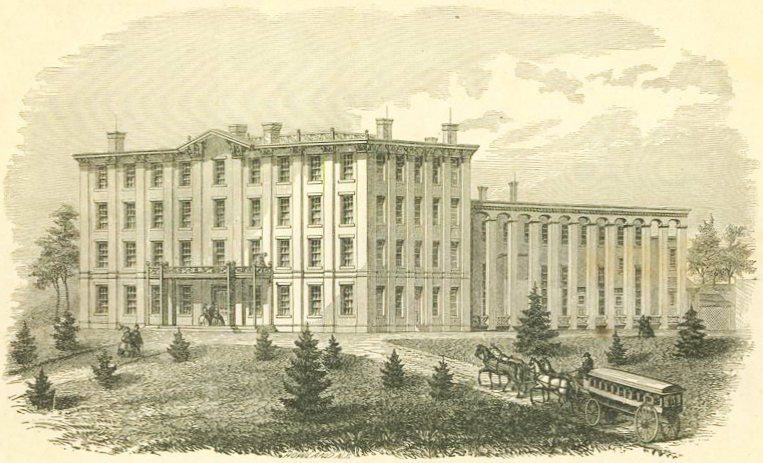
Caldwell Institute for Young Ladies, 1861

in 1854, the Kentucky legislature authorized a charter for the Henderson Female Institute. The institute's board of trustees selected a site for its campus and began to raise funds. A four-story brick building was constructed in 1859. That same year, Professor A. E. Sloan became the institute's president. When the school finally opened in September 1860, it name had changed to the Caldwell Institute for Young Ladies.

Caldwell Institute struggled to operate during the Civil War. Sloan resigned in 1864 and was replaced by Professor Augustine Hart. A year later, Hart was replaced by Rev. L. G. Barbour who was the institute's president until his resignation in 1874. The Second Presbyterian Church took over the school's operation in 1874.

=== Caldwell College ===
The Presbyterian Church changed the institute's name to Caldwell Female College in 1876. The college building was destroyed by fire in April 1876. Its trustees received insurance money but could not rebuild the college.

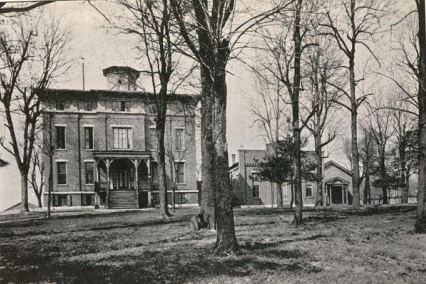
Main Building, Calwell College, Danville, Kentucky, 1898

In 1880, the trustees bought the former Danville Classical and Military Institute (now the site of Danville High School). Caldwell Female College reopened at its new location in September 1881. Its campus had limited accommodation for boarding students. It president was Rev. John Montgomery. In the 1882–83 school year, the college had 130 students. The college absorbed Bell Seminary, a local girls' school in 1885.

Charlotte A. Campbell became the college's president in 1886, serving until 1897. In early 1887, the college's name was shortened to Caldwell College. Dr. John C. Ely became its president in 1897. He was succeeded by John C. Acheson in 1902. Acheson expanded the college's curriculum, making it an accredited junior college. In June 1912, the college announced that it had raised $100,000 for campus improvements. Its trustees also adopted a plan for new buildings.

=== Kentucky College for Women ===
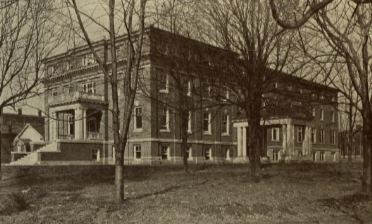
East Hall, c. 1914

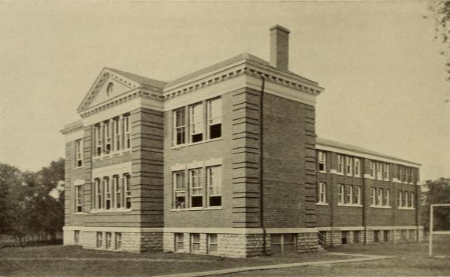
Gymnasium, c. 1914

On January 11, 1913, the board of trustees announced that the institution's name would change to Kentucky College for Women. The college had received a gift of $57,000 ($1,628,788 in 2022 money) from Dr. Nathaniel W. Conkling on New York, as well gifts totaling $175,000 ($5,700,758 in 2022 money) from other donors. The money was to help the non-profit college add buildings and grow into "one of the greatest colleges for higher education of women in the country". Conkling's gift was earmarked for Morgan Memorial Hall, honoring his friend, Mrs. Florence Morgan, who had supported women's education. He also required the name change to Kentucky College for Women as a condition of his gift.

President Acheson oversaw the addition of numerous buildings to the college campus, including East Hall, Morgan Hall, and the gymnasium. The Princeton Collegiate Institute of Princeton, Kentucky merged with the Kentucky College for Women in 1913. Frances Simrall Riker replaced Acheson as the college's president in 1914. The dean of the college in 1914 was Ruth Andrus. Riker was replaced by M. Marshall Allen in 1915. However, Acheson returned as the college's president in 1922. By 1922, the college had expanded its curriculum to offer four years of college and a Bachelor of Arts degree. Although the college seemed successful, it had financial problems. Acheson left in 1925 and was replaced by Paul B. Boyd.

Kentucky College for Women operated as a department of Centre College in 1926; it officially merged with Centre College in 1930 and operated as its women's division. In January 1962, the Centre campus became coed, resulting in the closure of the former Kentucky College for Women campus. Centre College maintains an archive of the records from Caldwell College and the Kentucky College for Women.

== Campus ==
Caldwell College was located in Danville, Kentucky on the site of today's Danville High School. Its main building was West Hall. The campus also included a small chapel designed by architect J. R. Carrigan in 1882. In 1882, the college could accommodate forty boarding students. A gymnasium was added in 1911. It included a basketaball court, a bowling alley, and a swimming pool. The campus was expanded to include East Hall which included dormitory rooms and a dining hall. Morgan Hall was added around 1914; it house the college's library. The campus also featured an aesthetic garden.

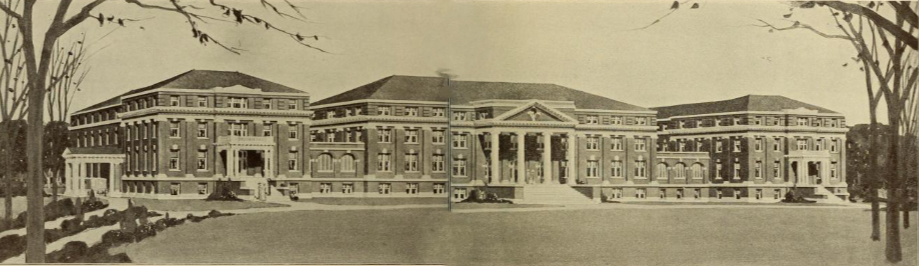
Morgan Hall, East Hall, and West Hall of Kentucky College for Women, Danville, Kentucky, c. 1914

== Academics ==
Before 1902, the college's curriculum focused on high school education and a college preparatory certificate. In 1902, it was also an accredited junior college. Its junior college coursework included English, history, Latin, mathematics, modern languages, and sciences. Students also had a choice of electives, including art and music. The music department taught harmony, music history, music theory, and instruction in the pianoforte, violin, and vocal performance. The college included a two-year program in home economics, with related classrooms and laboratories. The college began offering four years of college education and a B.A. degree in 1922.

== Student life ==
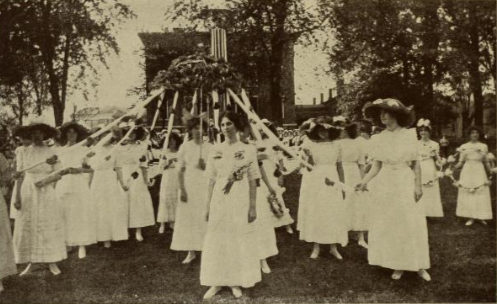
May Day Celebration, Kentucky College for Women, c. 1914

Caldwell College encouraged its students to participate in sports, including field hockey, soccer, and tennis. The college also had a Wahpanoochis intramural basketball team. In addition, there was the Caldwell College Broom Brigade, consisting of twenty members which drilled with brooms and a drummer. The students also participated in theatrical productions. Caldwell College had a chapter of Kappa Delta from June 1907 to 1908.

The Kentucky College for Women hosted an Artist Series that brought vocalists and instrumental artists to perform for the students. A dietitian to oversee the students' meals.

An alumnae association was established in 1882, during a reunion of graduates of Calwell Female Institute.

== Notable people ==
=== Alumnae ===
- Kate Breckenridge Karpeles, medical doctor, first woman to be appointed a contract surgeon by the United States Army

=== Board of Trustees ===
- Ormond Beatty, educator and seventh president of Centre College

== See also ==
- List of women's universities and colleges in the United States
- List of colleges and universities in Kentucky
