= WDFB =

WDFB can refer to:

- WDFB (AM), a radio station at 1170 AM licensed to Junction City, Kentucky
- WDFB-FM, a radio station at 88.1 FM licensed to Danville, Kentucky
