= Boyle County Schools =

School district in Kentucky, USA

Address
- 101 Citation Drive, Suite C Danville, (Boyle County), Kentucky, 40422; United States

District information
- Type: Public
- Motto: "Excellence in everything"
- Grades: K-12
- Superintendent: Mark Wade
- Budget: $27,000,000 annually

Students and staff
- Students: 2,650 (2018–19)
- Teachers: 185.20 (FTE) (2018–19)
- Student–teacher ratio: 14.77:1 (2018–19)

Other information
- Website: www.boyle.kyschools.us

Boyle County Schools is a school district located in Boyle County, Kentucky. The district is coterminous with the boundaries of the Boyle County except for the city of Danville, which has its own school district (Danville Schools). The district is about 168 square miles (440 km^{2}) in size. It comprises three elementary schools, one middle school, and one high school and provides educational programs for about 2600 students.

== Schools ==
Source (2018–19): National Center for Education Statistics
High school

- Boyle County High School (9–12) 884 students

Middle school

- Boyle County Middle School (6–8) 679 students

Elementary schools

- Junction City Elementary (PK–5) 420 students
- Perryville Elementary (PK–5) 294 students
- Woodlawn Elementary (PK–5) 660 students

== Board of education ==
The Board of Education has five members. Each member serves a four-year term. The current members of the Board of Education are:

- Jennifer Newby (Chairperson)
- Jesse Johnson (Vice-Chairperson)
- Ruth Ann Elliott
- Steve Tamme
- Laura Weddle

The superintendent is appointed by the Board and serves as secretary. The current superintendent is Mike LaFavers.
