= Constitution Square Historic Site =

Open-air museum in Kentucky, United States

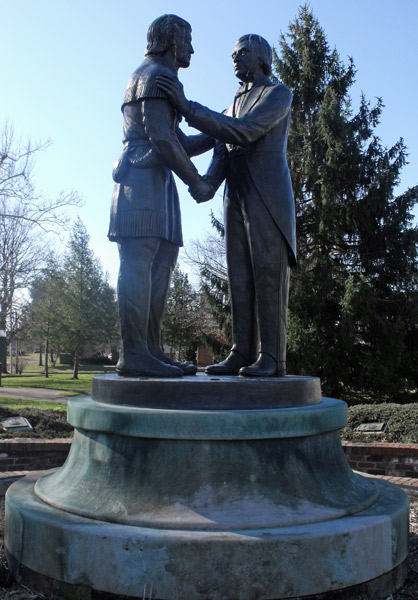
- Interactive map of Constitution Square Historic Site
- Type: County park
- Location: Danville, Kentucky
- Coordinates: 37.6453°N 84.7708°W
- Area: 3 acres (1.2 ha)
- Created: 1937
- Operator: Boyle County Fiscal Court
- Open: Year-round

Constitution Square Historic Site is a 3-acre (1.2 ha) park and open-air museum in Danville, Kentucky. From 1937 to 2012, it was a part of the Kentucky state park system and operated by the Kentucky Department of Parks. When dedicated in 1942, it was known as John G. Weisiger Memorial State Park, honoring the brother of Emma Weisiger, who donated the land for the park. Later, it was known as Constitution Square State Shrine and then Constitution Square State Historic Site. On March 6, 2012, the Department of Parks ceded control of the site to the county government of Boyle County, Kentucky, and its name was then changed to Constitution Square Historic Site.

The park celebrates the early political history of the U.S. state of Kentucky. It features replicas of three buildings that stood on the original city square, including the courthouse that housed ten constitutional conventions between 1785 and 1792; these conventions ultimately led to Kentucky's separation from Virginia. It also includes the original building that housed the first U.S. post office west of the Allegheny Mountains and several other early 19th century buildings of historical import. The site comprises the majority of the Constitution Square Historic District which was added to the National Register of Historic Places on April 2, 1976. Among the annual events held at the site are the Great American Brass Band Festival and the Soul of Second Street, a celebration of the African-American presence in the area around the park. The Kentucky State Barbecue Festival was held here for a few years.

== History ==
In 1774, a group of pioneers led by James Harrod constructed Fort Harrod (now Harrodsburg, Kentucky), the first permanent settlement in Kentucky. Three of these settlers – Thomas Harrod, John Crow, and James Brown – claimed the land in and around the present-day city of Danville, Kentucky, soon after. In 1784, Crow deeded 76 acres (31 ha) of land to Walker Daniel – Danville's namesake – to form the city proper. The city square was designated on a portion of this plot near its eastern end – not near the center, as was typical of other cities at the time. This location, about 500 feet (150 m) from John Crow's Station, provided an escape route in the event of an Indian attack.

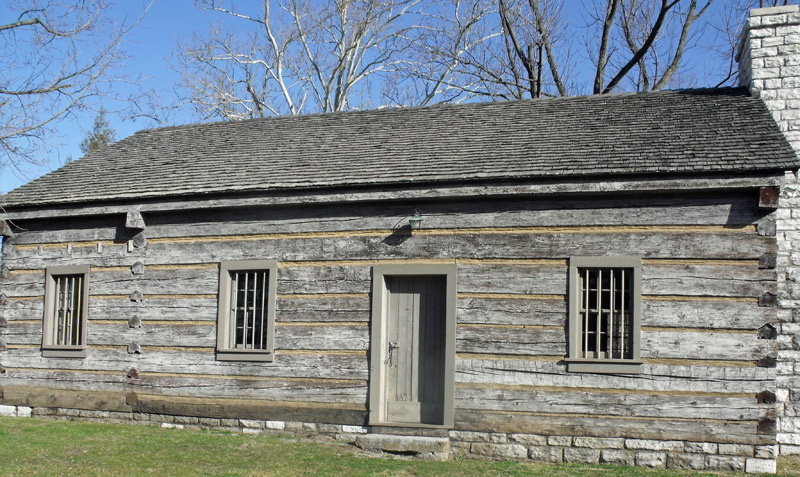
A replica of the district courthouse

The Virginia General Assembly created the Judicial District of Kentucky in 1783. Harrodsburg was designated as the district's first seat of justice, but because of inadequate facilities in Harrodsburg, the Supreme Court for the District of Kentucky moved its next session to Crow's Station and ordered the construction of a courthouse there. The courthouse was built on what is now Constitution Square in March 1785, and the court convened there regularly until its dissolution when Kentucky gained statehood in 1792.

The square fell into disuse after the district court disbanded, and, in 1817, the city's trustees sold half of the city square to raise money for the establishment of an educational institution known as Danville Academy. The money was to be used to buy at least 1 acre (0.40 ha) of land within 0.5 miles (0.80 km) of the square on which to locate the academy. On February 13, 1818, the trustees voted to sell the other half of the square and allocate the money to the same purpose. There is no record that Danville Academy was ever established, however; advocates of the academy's establishment apparently combined their efforts with those of the individuals who established Centre College in Danville, and the funds that had been designated for the founding of Danville Academy were re-allocated to Centre.

Danville's trustees also voted to give free use of the courthouse in the square to a group of Freemasons in 1817. The trustees sold another portion of the square near Main Street for the construction of private residences in 1823, and the Freemasons purchased the courthouse and the land it occupied in 1828. A group of Methodists purchased the land from the Freemasons in 1834, and they subsequently sold it to a Reverend Adams the following year. Adams purchased two adjacent plots and founded an all-female academy which ultimately failed. In 1854, the Danville Theological Seminary moved from the campus of Centre College to Constitution Square, occupying many of the buildings there. The brick courthouse became the main building of the seminary, and during the Civil War, it was used as a hospital to treat wounded soldiers – both Union and Confederate – in the aftermath of the Battle of Perryville. Danville Theological Seminary remained in operation until 1878. After its closure, the main building deteriorated and was eventually razed.

=== Creation of the park ===
On October 15, 1937, Danville resident Emma Weisiger donated the land that comprises Constitution Square Historic Site to the Commonwealth of Kentucky in memory of her brother, John. The state made the land into a state park; it was originally called Old Public Square, then Constitutional Square. Using a combination of state and local funds, the Danville Chamber of Commerce and the local chapter of the American Legion began constructing replicas of the jail, courthouse, and meetinghouse that originally occupied the square. At the time of the park's dedication on April 20, 1942, it was dubbed the John G. Weisiger Memorial State Park. Later, the name was changed to Constitution Square State Shrine. At the time of the dedication ceremony, all non-essential construction projects in the U.S. had been halted by the War Production Board due to the country's entry into World War II, and renovations to the park's attractions had consequently ceased. Dedication speeches by Governor Keen Johnson and Centre College president Robert L. McLeod Jr. contained reminders of the ongoing war and praise for the ideals of democracy. In addition, a plaque honoring the framers of the first Kentucky Constitution was dedicated by Louisville judge Lafon Allen and unveiled by Johnson's daughter, Judith, and Louise McDowell, a descendant of Judge Samuel McDowell, who presided over all ten constitutional conventions that took place in the original Constitution Square courthouse.

After the war ended with the defeat of Japan in 1945, the ban on nonessential construction was lifted, and the state restarted construction and restoration activities in Constitution Square in 1948. These activities included restoring and re-roofing the buildings, adding furniture to the buildings, constructing walkways, erecting signs, and adding landscaping to the park. The restorations were completed in 1955. From 1960 to 1968, the state added a fence around the site, installed a new lighting and diorama system, constructed a replica of the square's original pillory, and renovated several buildings, including an early 19th-century brick schoolhouse which became the caretaker's residence.

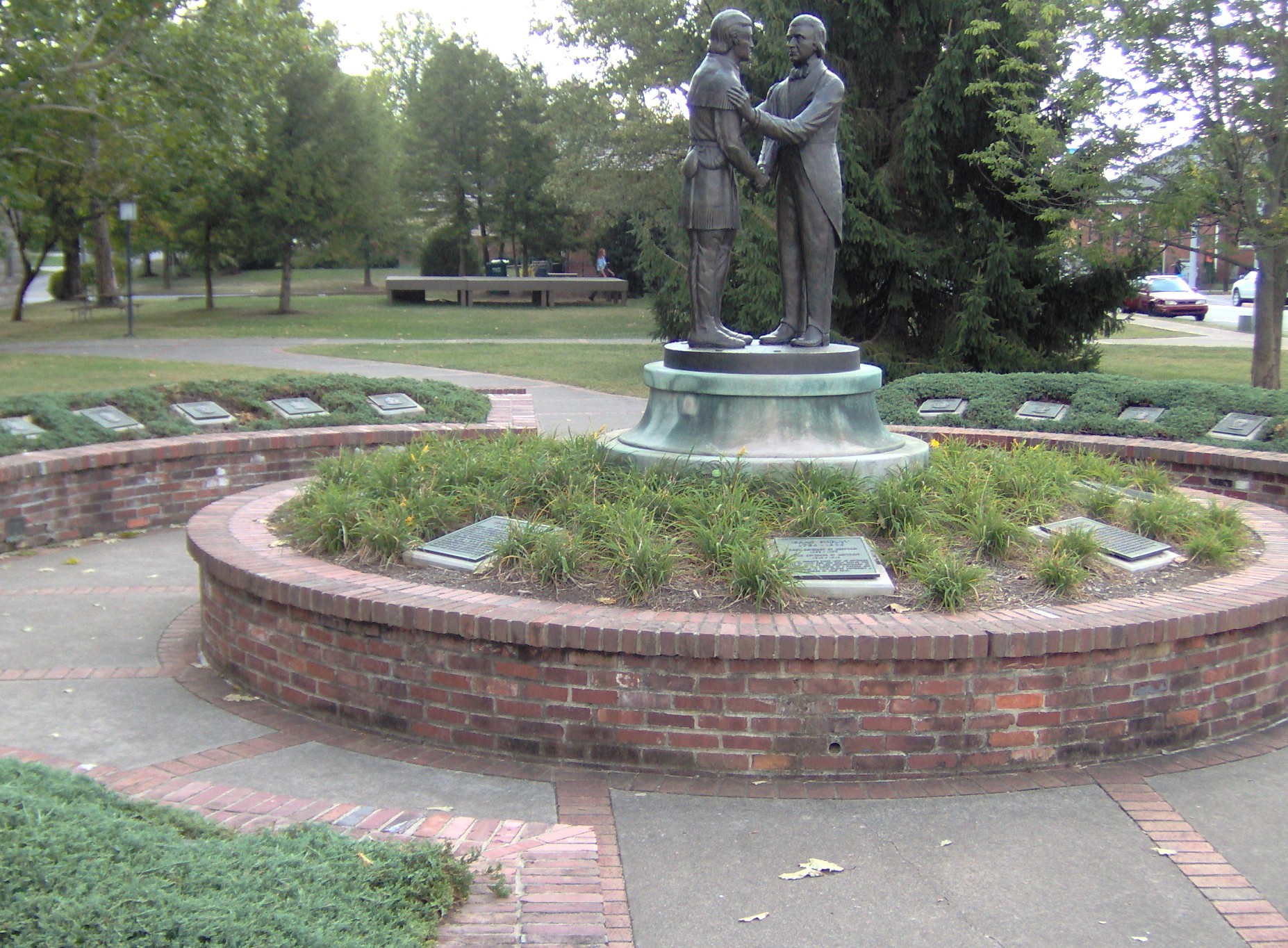
The Governor's Circle was added to the site in the 1970s.

In the 1970s, Centre College president Thomas A. Spragens began a series of urban renewal projects in Danville using grants from the U.S. Department of Housing and Urban Development. One such project was the expansion of Constitution Square and the restoration of some of its key features. Part of First Street was closed to accommodate the expansion, and the African-American business district, which lay on Constitution Square facing the Ephraim McDowell House, was razed. Grayson's Tavern, Fisher's row houses, the Goldsmith House, and the brick schoolhouse were renovated, and the Governor's Circle was added to the site. A bronze statue depicting two men shaking hands, a symbol taken from the state seal, stands in the middle of the Governor's Circle. Plaques that honor each governor of the state encircle the statue. The entirety of the Governor's Circle honors Isaac Shelby, Kentucky's first and fifth governor. Shelby is believed to be responsible for Kentucky's adoption of the motto "United we stand, divided we fall", which also appears on the state seal. The landscaping around the circle is maintained by the Garden Club of Danville.

In June 2011, the Kentucky Department of Parks began discussions with Boyle County officials concerning the possibility of transferring control of Constitution Square to the county government, and the transfer was completed March 6, 2012. In the interim, the county received a $500,000 grant from the Department of Housing and Urban Development to renovate many of the site's properties, turning Constitution Square into an economic hub for the area. Improvements to the site will include making the first floors of all buildings compliant with the Americans with Disabilities Act of 1990, upgrading the electrical and phone systems in many of the buildings, and installing a wireless network to turn the entire site into a Wi-Fi hotspot. The grant required that an archeological study of the area be completed prior to beginning these improvements; commencement of the study was delayed due to the vice-presidential debate hosted at nearby Centre College in October 2012.

In February 2013, the Kentucky Historical Society erected a historical marker in the park to commemorate the African-Americans who enlisted in the Union Army during the Civil War. In May 1864, the group of 250 men – mostly slaves, but including some freedmen – marched from Danville to nearby Camp Nelson in Jessamine County, where Colonel Andrew Clark allowed them to enlist after some initial hesitation. Arriving with wounds inflicted upon them in route, this group was the first to enlist at this site, where 10,000 United States Colored Troops trained.

On September 10, 2013, the Boyle County Fiscal Court voted to endow $100,000 with the Louisville-based Wilderness Trace Community Foundation for maintenance of the park. The fiscal court receives 4% of the endowment annually to spend on park maintenance.

== Buildings ==
Constitution Square lies between Main Street and Walnut Street on the north and south, respectively, and between First Street and Second Street on the east and west, respectively. It contains one original building – the post office – and replicas of the original courthouse, jail, and meetinghouse, which were constructed as authentically as possible based on available records.

=== Post office ===
The post office which lies at the north end of Constitution Square is an original structure. It was constructed sometime prior to 1792 and was the first U.S. post office built west of the Allegheny Mountains. Thomas Barbee, a member of a prominent early family in Danville, was commissioned as its first postmaster on August 20, 1792. The first mail was delivered to the post office on November 3, 1792. Originally located on Walnut Street, it was moved to its present location in 1950 by the Danville and Boyle County Historical Society and was dedicated to the Commonwealth of Kentucky on August 20, 1951.

=== Courthouse and jail ===
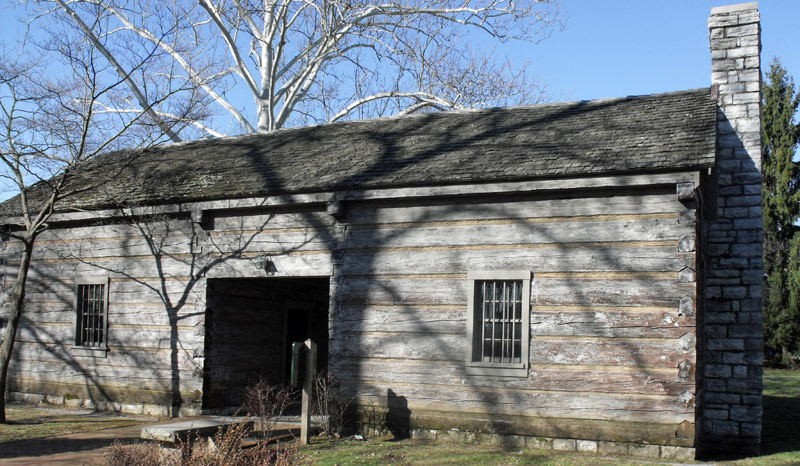
A replica of Isaac Hite's jail

The District of Kentucky and the Supreme Court of the District of Kentucky were both created in 1783. When the court moved to Danville in 1785, it ordered that two men determine the cost of constructing the buildings it needed to function, including a courthouse and jail. The report called for assessments to be made on the district's four counties for the construction of the buildings; Jefferson County was assessed £431, Nelson County £49, Fayette County £86, and Lincoln County £122. Isaac Hite was chosen to construct the buildings, which were finished in 1785. The jail was built in the center of the square, and the courthouse was situated between the jail and Walnut Street.

The district court held its first session in Hite's courthouse on March 14, 1785, and continued meeting there until its dissolution in 1792. Additionally, the Kentucky Council of War used the courthouse as its meeting place, and between 1785 and 1792, a series of ten constitutional conventions were held there. These conventions ultimately produced the first Kentucky Constitution, which was adopted in 1792. Soon after, the original courthouse was replaced with a two-story brick courthouse.

Little is known of the jail originally built by Isaac Hite. Court records show that it was to be built of hewn logs no less than 9 inches (230 mm) thick and have at least two cells. The replica courthouse that now stands in Constitution Square was completed in 1942. It houses several personal items belonging to Kentucky's first governor, Isaac Shelby, including his hunting bag, powder flask, surveyor's instruments, and the chair in which he died. The courthouse also contains a portrait of Shelby and some Native American artifacts found in the vicinity.

=== Presbyterian meetinghouse ===
Tradition holds that John Crow constructed a meetinghouse on the square in Danville prior to 1784, but the first meetinghouse described in surviving records was constructed in mid-1784 for use by Presbyterian minister David Rice. A replica of this meetinghouse was constructed in Constitution Square in 1942. The single-story log structure has a small bell tower on top. Rice's original meetinghouse was first used by the newly formed Concorde Presbyterian Congregation, the first Presbyterian congregation in what is now Kentucky. James Crawford and Tereh Templin, the first two Presbyterian ministers in Kentucky, were ordained at this meetinghouse on November 10, 1785.

=== Grayson's Tavern ===
Benjamin Grayson constructed Grayson's Tavern in Danville sometime around 1785. The asymmetrical, ell-shaped building faces south onto Walnut Street with a front entrance on the south and a side entrance on the west, which opens onto Constitution Square. The Mary Akin Memorial Herb Garden, located behind Grayson's Tavern, features a variety of herbs that were commonly cultivated in the area during the late 18th and early 19th century, including chives, fennel, honeysuckle, lavender, rosemary, sage, and thyme. The garden is maintained by the Garden Club of Danville and named for one of its long-time members.

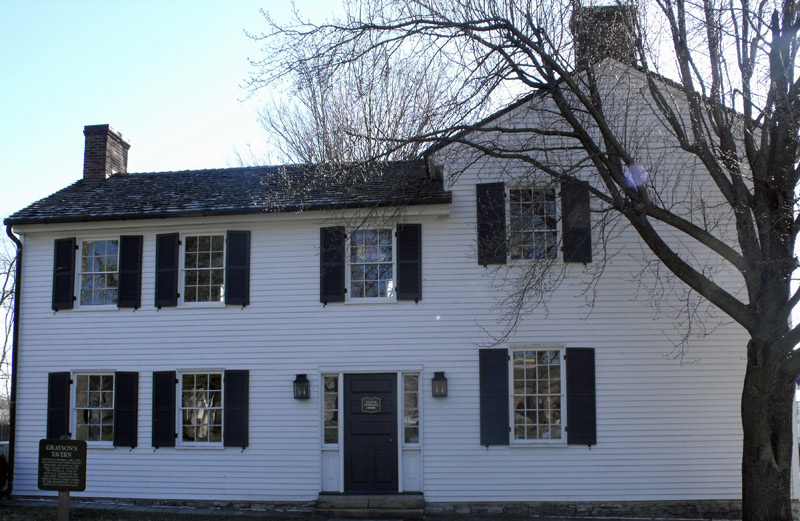
A replica of Grayson's Tavern

The Danville Political Club, a debating society which existed between 1786 and 1790, frequently held its meetings at the tavern. Many members of this society went on to become prominent political leaders at the state and national levels. Eleven of the club's thirty members would participate in at least one of the ten constitutional conventions that helped separate Kentucky from Virginia. Among the members were Kentucky's first Secretary of State (and future U.S. Senator from Louisiana), James Brown; its third governor, Christopher Greenup; chief justice of the Kentucky Court of Appeals, George Muter; federal judges Harry Innes, William McClung, and Samuel McDowell; Congressmen Willis Green, Stephen Ormsby, Thomas Speed, David Walker, and Matthew Walton; U.S. Senator John Brown; and Thomas Todd, a justice of the Supreme Court of the United States. The existence of the club was lost to history until Speed's grandson, Thomas Speed II, discovered extensive minutes of its meetings that his grandfather, the club secretary, had taken and stored in a desk drawer. The younger Speed later published these minutes with his own commentary about the club, in which he opined that "Full and complete biographies of some of the members would present a history of Kentucky from the beginning of its settlement past the first quarter of the ensuing century." One of the few extant references to the Club outside Speed's meeting minutes is an entry in the journal of a U.S. Army paymaster named Major Beatty; while staying overnight at Grayson's Tavern, Beatty recorded that he and his companions were "very much disturbed by a Political Club which met in the next house where we slept and kept us awake till 12 or 1 o'clock."

In 1787, Benjamin Grayson sold the tavern to Robert Craddock, who subsequently converted it into his private residence. The replica that stands in Constitution Square houses the offices of the Convention and Tourism Bureau and The Great American Brass Band Festival. When Boyle County took over Constitution Square, the fiscal court agreed to waive the rent paid by the Convention and Tourism Bureau in exchange for its in-kind services managing the park jointly with the Boyle County Industrial Foundation. Danville Mayor Bernie Hunstad opposed the arrangement, fearing that park management would dilute both organizations' primary missions of bringing jobs to the area. In March 2013, Hunstad resigned his ex-officio membership on the Boyle County Industrial Foundation in protest.

=== Schoolhouse ===
Little is known of the brick schoolhouse that faces west onto Constitution Square and stands between the Watts-Bell House and Grayson's Tavern. Local tradition holds that it dates to approximately the same time as the buildings near it and that it housed a private school. According to the Danville-Boyle County Convention and Visitors Bureau, it was constructed around 1820 and was the first brick schoolhouse west of the Allegheny Mountains. The single-story, two-room edifice is built upon a fieldstone foundation with brick laid in common bond and an off-center entrance with a transom above. While Constitution Square was a part of the state park system, the park manager lived in the schoolhouse. After the park's transfer to Boyle County, the schoolhouse was converted into a conference center with meeting space.

=== Fisher's Row Houses ===
Jeremiah Fisher constructed two row houses, joined by a common wall and constructed of brick laid in a Flemish bond, near the city square in 1817. These houses lay on Second Street and face west onto Constitution Square. Fisher owned and rented these houses until 1850, but after he sold them they were used as tenements until at least the 1940s. The Wilderness Trace Art League and Boyle County Historical Society Museum occupied the row houses, before the park's purchase by the county. It now houses the Danville-Boyle County Chamber of Commerce, the Arts Commission of Danville-Boyle County, and the communications department of the Danville Boyle-County Economic Development Partnership.

=== Watts–Bell House ===
The Watts–Bell House was originally constructed by William Watts for local merchant David Bell in 1816. It appears to have originally been constructed for some public use. Bell's son, future legislator and Lieutenant Governor Joshua Fry Bell, was reared in the house. It lies between Fisher's Row Houses and Grayson's Tavern on Second Street and also faces west onto Constitution Square. The two-story, asymmetrical house is laid in Flemish bond with queen closers. Beginning in 1839, the Danville Literary and Social Club met in the house. Before its dissolution about 2010, the Danville/Boyle County Historical Society Museum was headquartered here. It now contains executive offices and a conference room used by the Danville-Boyle County Economic Development Partnership.

=== Alban Goldsmith House ===
The Alban Goldsmith House was constructed sometime prior to 1820. The story-and-a-half brick edifice is laid in common bond with a Flemish bond facade on the front. Three gabled windows were added to the facade many years after its construction. Interior chimneys with corbels on top adorn each end of the house. It faces west onto Second Street, away from Constitution Square, and opposite the Ephraim McDowell House across the street.

The house was owned by Dr. Alban Goldsmith, who studied medicine with Ephraim McDowell. When McDowell performed the first ovariotomy, Goldsmith acted as his assistant. Goldsmith would later help found the Louisville Medical Institute. In 1827, Goldsmith sold the house to Jefferson Polk, then a newspaper publisher, but later a doctor who practiced briefly in Danville before moving to Perryville, Kentucky.

The Alban Goldsmith House contains the Constitution Square Museum Store and the Heart of Danville, a local economic development organization.

== Events ==
In April 1987, Danville's local newspaper, the Danville Advocate-Messenger, sponsored the first Rally on the Square, a political rally where candidates for statewide office can make speeches and meet area voters. Since then, the rally has been held every four years in April, in advance of the statewide primary elections in May. The first Rally on the Square featured a brass band from nearby Centre College, which inspired the city to hold the first Great American Brass Band Festival in 1990. The festival has been held annually in June ever since. Constitution Square is one of the locales used for outdoor performances during the festival.

The first Constitution Square Festival was held at Constitution Square State Historic Site in 1979. The event was held annually on the third weekend in September and featured historical reenactments, crafts, food, and music. In February 2009, the Kentucky Department of Parks announced that the festival would be suspended due to budget cuts prompted by the economic recession. Shortly after the announcement, three community organizations – the Heart of Danville, the Danville-Boyle County Convention and Visitors Bureau, and the Community Arts Center – volunteered to coordinate the festival without state funds. These groups gave the festival a more arts-centric focus and renamed it the Constitution Square Arts Festival. The event continued until 2011, but was suspended in 2012.

Constitution Square has hosted an annual charity run every year since 1978. After the opening of Danville's Community Arts Center in 2004, Ernst Crown-Weber, a local businessman, renamed the event Constitution Square 5K Run for the Arts and began organizing it as a way to raise money for the center. A local artist, Alison Craig, designs original awards to be presented to the winners.

In November 2011, the first Kentucky State Barbecue Festival was held in Constitution Square. The event, conceived just ten weeks prior by a local couple, proved very popular, and the following year the festival was moved to the September weekend previously reserved for the suspended Constitution Square Arts Festival. The Southeast Tourism Society named the festival one of its Top 20 Events in the Southeast for September 2013.
