= Warrenwood Manor =

Coordinates: 37.6009°N 84.7725°W

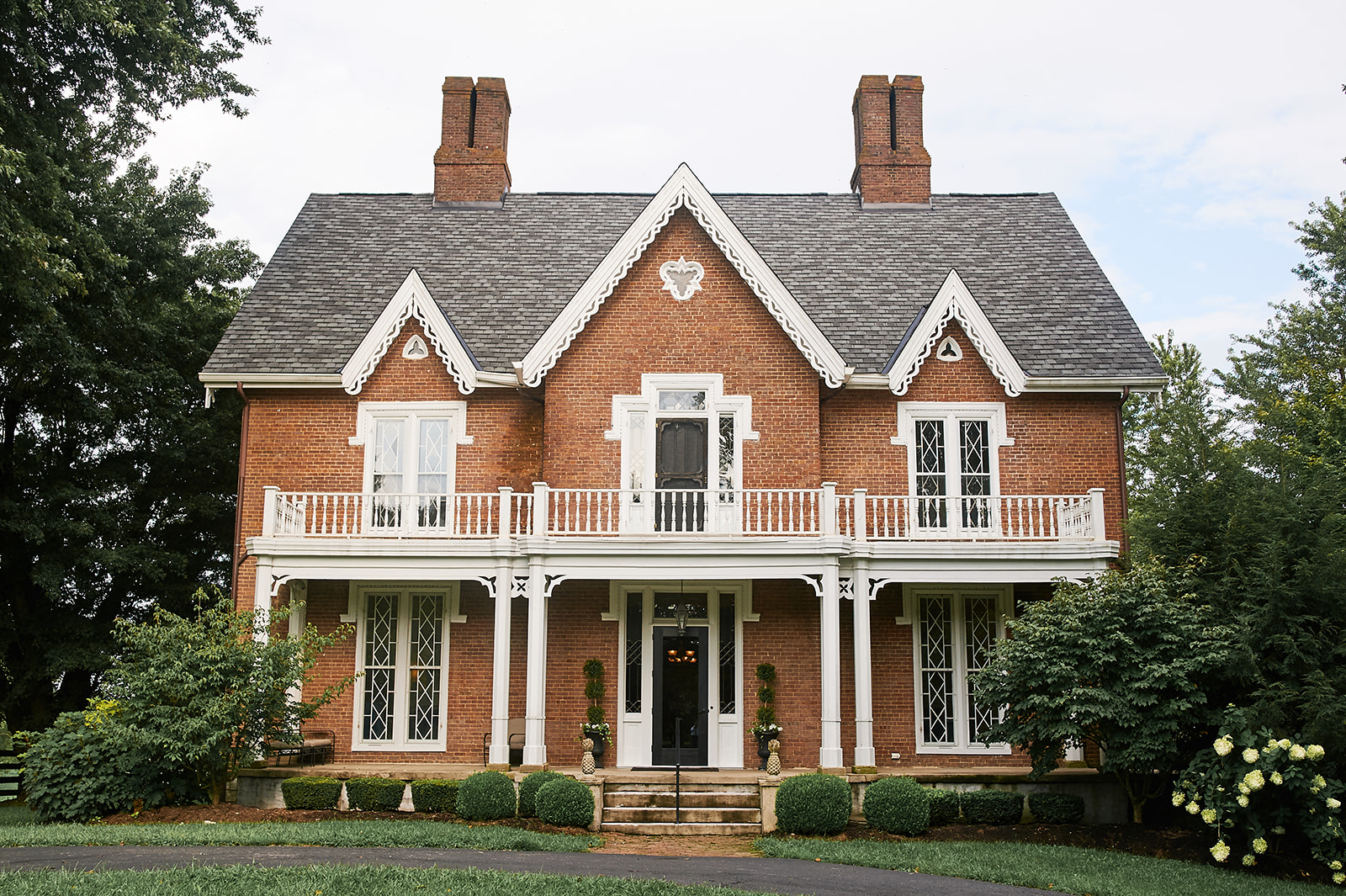
- Interactive map of the Warrenwood Manor area

General information
- Location: 3044 US Hwy 127 South Danville, KY 40422, Danville, KY, United States
- Construction started: 1840
- Completed: 1856

Design and construction
- Architects: Samuel and John Fourche Warren
- Awards and prizes: National Register of Historic Places

Warrenwood Manor is a historic property located in Danville, Kentucky, USA. The manor was built in 1856 by Samuel and John Fourche Warren, sons of the Revolutionary War veteran and legislator William Warren. The Warren family moved several times before finally locating upon the present site. The property has been occupied by prominent owners including the Reed, Warren and Shelby families, in the order in which they are named. The architecture of the home includes diamond shaped window panes across the front, a wide hand carved door and window facings and massive enameled white mantels.

== History ==
The construction of Warrenwood by the Warren brothers, John (1806–1863) and Samuel Warren (1807–1878), sons of William Warren (1771–1825), began in 1840 and was completed in 1856. Mrs. William Warren used the home to entertain guests such as the Card Club and Daughters of the American Revolution. The Warren family lived in the home until 1908, when it was sold. The name Warrenwood is derived from that of the original owner and builder. In 1933 Warrenwood was sold at auction to Henry Hudson, who purchased 379 acres for $53.05 per acre from the Joint Stock & Land Bank, Lexington. After his death, Hudson's widow and two daughters operated the Warrenwood farm. The property was in possession of the family for over 21 years. In 1976, Warrenwood was completely renovated by the H.C. Abbott family. Warrenwood was listed on the National Register of Historic Places in 1977. The fight to preserve Warrenwood came in 1990 when US Highway 127 was being widened to four lanes between Danville and Junction City. During this time, the owner of Warrenwood, Mary Oldham, fought to preserve her home and the entrance to her property. After Mary Oldham's attempts, the state reviewed the road work in order to lessen the impact on Warrenwood and preserve the property.

== Architecture ==
With its “gingerbread” style architecture, Warrenwood Manor is one example of Gothic Revival architecture in Kentucky. The house rests on a stone foundation that was constructed two years before the house was erected. Three gables on the front part of the house are trimmed in a white wood in the decorative “gingerbread” design. The roof of the porch, which extends nearly all the way across the three-story structure, is edged with a balustrade and is supported by eight slender columns. Three large limestone steps lead up to the house from the lawn. Double windows with diamond-shaped glass panes across the front of the structure carry out the style of architecture in the mid-1800 period of early America. The house walls are three bricks thick. The bricks for the home were made in kilns on the property and lumber from the forest on the lands was used in the interior of the home. The home also includes nine working fireplaces to heat each room. The rooms of the house are eighteen feet wide and ceilings fourteen feet high.

== The Farm ==
Warrenwood farm was originally 419 acres and was sold in 1932 by Danville Realty Company which subdivided the farm into three tracts of suitable sizes.
