= Danville High School (Kentucky) =

Location
- 203 E. Lexington Ave. Danville, KY 40422; United States
- Coordinates: 37.649°N 84.767°W

Information
- Type: public high school
- School district: Danville Schools
- CEEB code: 180645
- Principal: Danny Goodwin
- Teaching staff: 31.38 (FTE)
- Grades: 9–12
- Enrollment: 497 (2023–2024)
- Student to teacher ratio: 15.84
- Campus: Small city
- Colors: Blue and White
- Team name: Admirals
- Newspaper: The Log
- Feeder schools: Bate Middle School
- Website: Danville High School

Danville High School is a public high school serving the ninth through twelfth grades in Danville, Kentucky, United States. It is one of four schools and the only high school in the Danville School district.

Its boundary includes most of Danville.

== School information ==
The student-teacher ratio is 16, which matches the state average of 16. Spending per pupil is $9,310, higher than the state average of $7,639.

The makeup of the student body is 51% male, 49% female, 72% White, not Hispanic, 24% Black, not Hispanic, 3% Hispanic, and 1% Asian/Pacific Islander. 44% of students are eligible for free or reduced-price lunch program.

In 2006 American College Testing (ACT) Statistics were:

- Composite Score: 21.5
- Math Score: 20.6
- English Score: 21.8
- Reading Score: 21.9
- Science Score: 21.2

== Extracurricular activities ==
=== Athletics ===
Danville High School holds a long tradition of excellence in athletics, highlighted by 11 State Football Championships, 10 State Track and Field Championships (3 Boys', 7 Girls'), a number of State Cross Country Championships, and numerous Regional and District titles. Danville High School competes in the following interscholastic sports:

- Baseball
- Boys' basketball
- Girls' basketball
- Cheerleading
- Cross country
- Football
- Golf
- Boys' soccer
- Girls' soccer
- Softball
- Swimming
- Boys' tennis
- Girls' tennis
- Track
- Volleyball
- Wrestling

=== Clubs and organizations ===
Students participate in the following clubs and organizations:

- Art Club
- Band
- Book Club
- Choir
- DECA
- Diversity Club
- Drama Club
- Fellowship of Christian Athletes (FCA)
- Forensics
- French Club
- Governor's Cup
- HOSA
- Junior Statesmen
- MADD
- National Honor Society
- Pep Club
- Roots and Shoots
- Second Step
- Spanish Club
- Student Council
- STLP
- Teens Against Tobacco Use (TATU)
- The Log
- Upward Bound
- Young Achievers

=== Forensics ===
Danville High School's forensics team is nationally recognized for its excellence. Coach Steve Meadows resurrected the team in 1994 after its founding in the late 1940s. Since that time, the team has garnered the Founder's Award at the Catholic National Forensic League National Tournament (2002), the Schwan's School of Excellence Trophy at the National Forensic League National Tournament (2007), six Kentucky High School Speech League (KHSSL) state championships (2006, 2007, 2008, 2009, 2012, 2017), four Kentucky Educational Speech and Drama Association (KESDA) state championships (2008, 2011, 2012, 2017), and numerous regional and invitational tournaments. In 2008, it became the only team ever in Kentucky to capture championships in all four major state contests in the same year - KHSSL, KESDA, National Forensic League (NFL) Districts, and Catholic National Forensic League (CFL) Districts. It repeated this feat in 2012 and 2017. The team has produced ten CFL and NFL national finalists. The team has also produced numerous individual event state champions. It holds Chair 214 at the Barkley Forum for High Schools, a national invitational tournament in which it has excelled by producing eleven finalists since 2004.

== Notable alumni ==
- John Fetterman, Pulitzer Prize-winning reporter
- Ashley Gorley, songwriter and producer
- Larnelle Harris, Gospel singer and songwriter
- Maurice Manning, poet
- James E. Rogers Jr., president and CEO of Duke Energy
- Frank X. Walker, poet
