= Kate Breckenridge Karpeles =

American medical doctor (1887–1941)

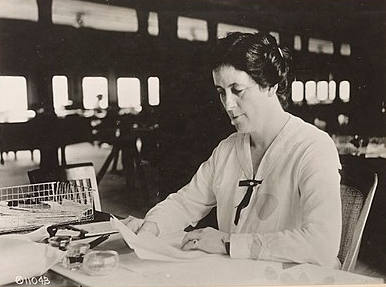
Kate Breckenridge Karpeles, from a 1918 photograph by the War Department, in the National Archives.

Kate Breckenridge Karpeles (née Bogle; October 1887 – August 15, 1941) was an American medical doctor. She was the first woman to be appointed a contract surgeon by the United States Army, during World War I, and she served as president of the American Medical Women's Association.

== Early life ==
Katherine Breckenridge Bogle was born in Danville, Kentucky, the daughter of Dr. John Cowan Bogle and Della MacFerran. Her father was a medical doctor. She attended Kentucky College for Women and completed undergraduate studies at Goucher College in 1909, and earned her medical degree at Johns Hopkins University in 1914.

== Career ==
As a new medical doctor, Kate Bogle had internships at Garfield Hospital (1914–1915) in Washington, D. C. In 1918, she became the first woman appointed as a contract surgeon with the United States Army, stationed in Washington, D. C. as assistant surgeon at the Emergency Dispensary, treating civilian employees of the War Department. She held the equivalent rank of first lieutenant.

After the war, in addition to her private practice and hospital affiliation, she worked with the Women's Bureau of the Metropolitan Police Department in Washington, and spoke to women's organizations. In 1932, she donated her medical services to the Bonus Army protesters and their families in their encampment. She was president of the American Medical Women's Association from 1938 to 1939. In that role, she petitioned Congress for women military doctors to receive the same pay, rank, and benefits as their male colleagues.

== Personal life ==
Kate Breckenridge Bogle married Simon Rufus Karpeles; Simon, also a medical doctor, was the son of Leopold Karpeles. They had two children, Della and Leopold. She was injured in a car accident in 1939. Kate Karpeles died in 1941, aged 54 years. Her remains are buried at Arlington National Cemetery.
