= Lincoln County High School (Kentucky) =

Coordinates: 37.512494°N 84.655440°W

- 60 Education Way, Stanford, KY 40484; United States

Information
- Type: Public School
- Established: 1974
- School district: Lincoln County Schools
- Principal: Micheal Godbey
- Teaching staff: 57.20 (FTE)
- Grades: 9 to 12
- Enrollment: 916 (2023–2024)
- Student to teacher ratio: 16.01
- Colors: Red and Blue
- Mascot: Patriots
- Website: https://www.lincoln.kyschools.us/o/lchs

Lincoln County High School is a public secondary school located in Stanford, Kentucky. It was opened in August 1974 for the 1974–1975 school year, after the consolidation of the local high schools of the towns of Lincoln County; Stanford, Crab Orchard, Hustonville, McKinney, and King's Mountain area (Memorial). In the 2016–2017 school year, 1027 students were enrolled at Lincoln County High School. An estimated 24,456 people live in Lincoln County as of 2017, so the students of Lincoln County High School represent 4.20% of the county's population.

The mascot is the "Patriot", a man clad in red, white and blue American Revolution era garb.

Across the board, the percentage of students of Lincoln County High School scoring "Proficient" or "Distinguished" in their standardized tests is higher than that of students in the district and the state. The graduation rate for students of Lincoln County High School is 96.2%, 3.1% more students than the district and 6.4% more students than the state.

Lincoln County High School's campus is located on Education Way. This campus is shared with Lincoln County Middle School and Lincoln County Area Technology Center.
