= James E. Rogers Jr. =

American businessman and author

- Born: September 20, 1947; Birmingham, Alabama, U.S.
- Died: December 17, 2018 (aged 71); Louisville, Kentucky, U.S
- Education: Emory University; University of Kentucky
- Occupation: Businessman
- Political party: Democratic; Republican
- Spouse(s): Robyn McGill (divorced); Mary Anne (M.A.) Rogers
- Children: 3

James Eugene Rogers Jr. (September 20, 1947 – December 17, 2018) was an American businessman and author. He was president and CEO of Duke Energy, the largest electrical utility in the U.S., from April, 2006 until July 1, 2013. He stayed on as chairman of the board until retiring the following December. His book, Lighting the World, which explores the issues involved in bringing electricity to over 1.2 billion people on earth who lack it, was published August 25, 2015, by St. Martin's Press. The book asserts that access to electricity should be recognized as a basic human right.

== Biography ==
=== Early life ===
Rogers was born on September 20, 1947, in Birmingham, Alabama and spent most of his childhood in Danville, Kentucky. He attended Emory University and graduated from the University of Kentucky with a Bachelor of Business Administration in 1970 and a Juris Doctor in 1974. Rogers lived in Charlotte, North Carolina with his wife, Mary Anne (M.A.) Rogers until his death.

=== Career ===
While in college, he worked full-time as a reporter for the Lexington Herald-Leader. He was a law clerk for the Supreme Court of Kentucky, and was an Assistant Attorney General of Kentucky. He was a trial attorney, and then assistant to the chief trial counsel, and later was deputy general counsel for litigation and enforcement, at the Federal Energy Regulatory Commission. He was a partner with the Washington, D.C., office of the Dallas-based law firm Akin Gump Strauss Hauer & Feld. He served as executive vice president of Interstate Pipelines for the Enron Gas Pipeline Group.

In 1988, he became president, chairman and CEO of PSI Energy. From 1995 to 2006, he served as president and CEO of Cinergy. In 2006 he oversaw the merger of Cinergy and Duke Energy, and became the combined company's president and CEO. Subsequently, he merged Duke Energy with Progress Energy, creating the largest utility in the U.S. He retired in 2013.

During his almost 25 years as a CEO in the utility industry, Rogers engineered a series of acquisitions and mergers that created the largest electric utility in the U.S., as measured by market capitalization. He delivered an average annual shareholder return of more than 12 percent by rousing on sustainable growth during his tenure as CEO. Duke Energy and its predecessor company, Cinergy, owned and/or operated assets in 17 countries in Africa, South Asia, Europe, and Central and Latin America.

In 2014 Rogers joined Duke University as a Rubenstein Fellow, to co-teach a graduate seminar, Renewables and the World’s Poor, focused on meeting the needs of the 1.2 billion people on earth who lack electrical power. He also lectured on this subject in the five graduate schools at Duke – engineering, business, environmental science, law, and public policy. He was on the advisory boards of Bloomberg’s New Energy Finance, Invenergy, and Broadscale. He recently served on the board of Energy Solar Association, and the Smart Electric Power Alliance (formerly the Solar Electric Power Association). He also served on the boards of The Aspen Institute, the Brookings Institution, the Asia Society, and the Nicholas Institute on Environmental Policy Solutions at Duke University, and the advisory committee for Sustainable Energy for All (United Nations), and was a member of the global board of the Nature Conservancy. He served on the board of directors of Cigna, a Fortune 500 company.

He spoke often on the subject of energy access, the future of the power industry and the role of renewables at utility executive gatherings, social policy workshops and international confederations. Newsweek magazine named him one of the 50 most powerful people in the world in 2009.

He died of sepsis while visiting family in Louisville, aged 71.

=== Climate Change and Electrical Power ===
Under Rogers' leadership, Duke Energy was recognized as a leader in sustainability. In 2010 and 2011, the company was named to the elite Dow Jones Sustainability World Index; it has been a part of the Dow Jones Sustainability Index for North America for the past nine years. In 2008 The New York Times Magazine explored the question of whether Jim Rogers was "A Green Coal Baron?"

Rogers advocated investing in energy efficiency and renewables such as solar and wind; modernizing the electric infrastructure; and pursuing advanced technologies and nuclear energy to grow the economy and transition to a low-carbon future. While at Duke Energy, he invested four billion dollars in wind and solar assets. He served as vice chairman of the World Business Council for Sustainable Development, and was a founding member of the U.S. Climate Action Partnership, a collaboration of leading businesses and environmental groups that came together to call on the federal government to enact legislation to reduce greenhouse gas emissions.

In 2011, along with Joe Hale, Rogers founded the Global Bright Light Foundation, a non-profit organization dedicated to bringing economically sustainable home solar lighting systems to people around the world who lack power.

=== Other Corporate and Non-Profit Boards ===
In the U.S., he was chairman of the Edison Electric Institute (EEI) when it changed its position to support federal climate change legislation in 2009. He was also the founding chairman of the Institute for Electric Efficiency, former co-chair of the Alliance to Save Energy and past co-chair of the National Action Plan for Energy Efficiency. He was formerly a member of the boards of the Institute of Nuclear Power Operations, the Nuclear Electric Institute, and the World Association of Nuclear Operators. He served on the board of directors of Applied Materials, Duke Realty Corporation, Bankers Life Holding Corporation, Indiana National Bank and Fifth Third Bancorp. He also served on the boards of the United States Chamber of Commerce, the Business Roundtable, the National Coal Council, the National Petroleum Council, the American Gas Association.

He is a past member of the honorary committee of the joint US-China cooperation on clean energy (JUCCE). He has spoken at symposia including the Aspen Institute, the Brookings Institution, Clinton Global Initiative and the World Economic Forum in Davos, Switzerland.

In 2012, he was co-chair of the host committee for the Democratic Convention in Charlotte.

=== Awards ===
Rogers was honored with numerous awards and recognitions, including six honorary degrees from a variety of US universities. In 2011, he was presented with the Ernst & Young Entrepreneur of the Year® Lifetime Achievement Award and the Charlotte Regional Partnership Jerry Award. The Charlotte Business Journal also named Rogers its Business Person of the Year for 2011. Also in 2011, Rogers received the Asia Society of Washington's International Business Leadership Award and the Committee of 100's Business Excellence Award for his efforts to improve business relations between the U.S. and China. He was also recognized by the U.S.-China Policy Foundation with their Global Executive Leadership Award.

In 2013, Rogers was awarded the Edison Electric Institute’s Distinguished Leadership Award by his industry peers. He was the 2013 recipient of the United States Energy Association Award. In 2014, he was inducted into the North Carolina Business Hall of Fame.

He was named the most influential person in the power generation industry by Power Engineering magazine and the energy industry's CEO of the Year by Platts. He was also named to the STEMconnector® List of 100 CEO Leaders in STEM.

Rogers was an active community leader and received a number of honors and awards for his service including the Boy Scouts of America Distinguished Honoree from the Mecklenburg County Council; the Ellis Island Medal of Honor from the National Ethnic Coalition of Organizations (NECO); the 1996 Energy Daily Corporate Leadership Award, the 1998 Hebrew Union College Cincinnati Associates Tribute Honoree, the 2004 National Conference for the Community and Justice (NCCJ) Distinguished Service Citation, the 2005 Ronald McDonald House Lifetime Achievement Award, the 2005 Keystone Center Leadership in Industry Award, and the 2006 Human Relations Award from the American Jewish Committee, Cincinnati Chapter.
