= Jacob Tamme =

American football player (born 1985)

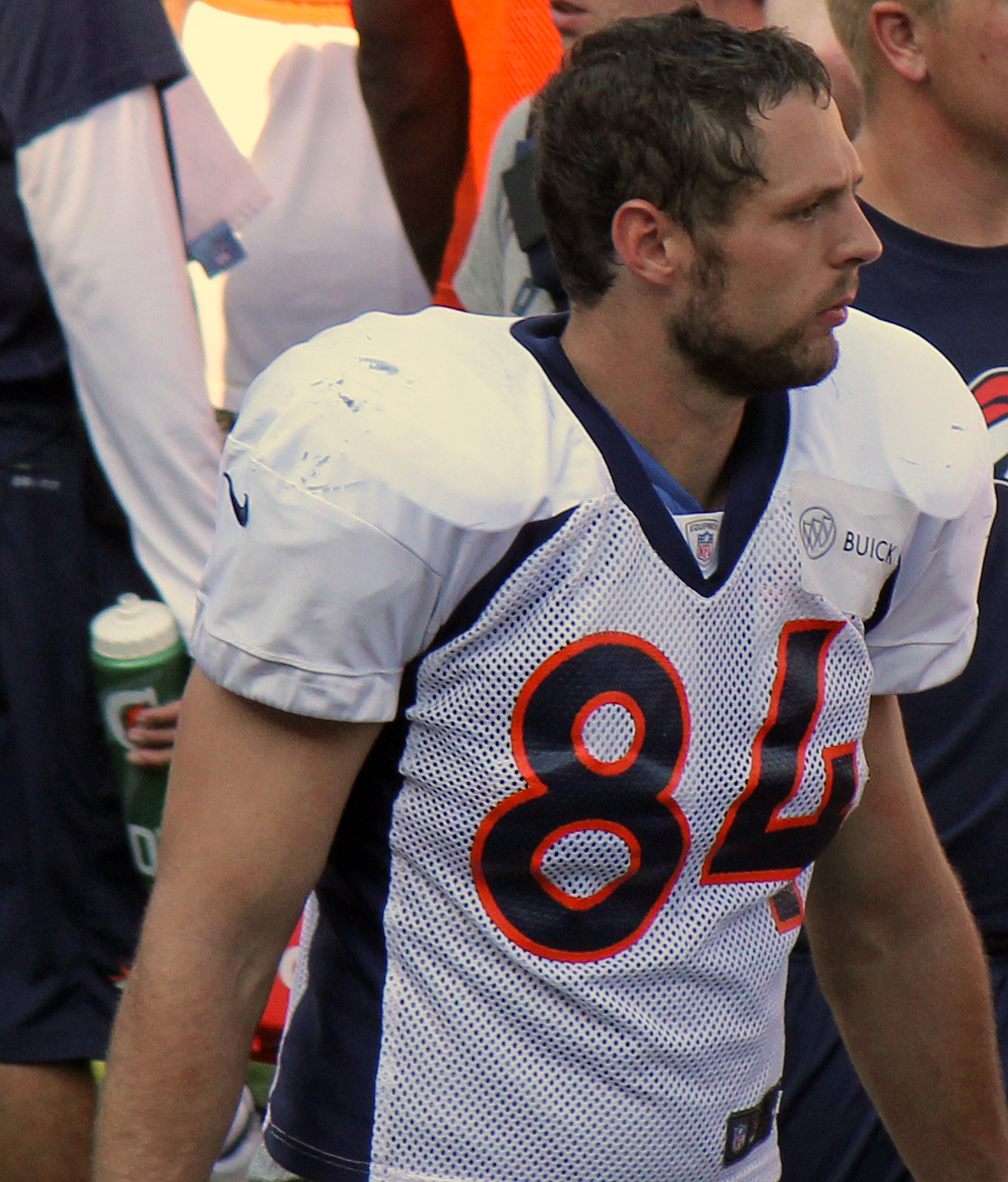
- Tamme with the Denver Broncos in 2014

No. 84, 83
- Position: Tight end

Personal information
- Born: March 15, 1985 (age 41); Lexington, Kentucky, U.S.
- Listed height: 6 ft 3 in (1.91 m)
- Listed weight: 230 lb (104 kg)

Career information
- High school: Boyle County (Danville, Kentucky)
- College: Kentucky (2003–2007)
- NFL draft: 2008: 4th round, 127th overall pick

Career history
- Indianapolis Colts (2008–2011); Denver Broncos (2012–2014); Atlanta Falcons (2015–2016)

Awards and highlights
- 2× First-team All-SEC (2006, 2007)

Career NFL statistics
- Receptions: 259
- Receiving yards: 2,570
- Receiving average: 9.9
- Receiving touchdowns: 14
- Stats at Pro Football Reference

Jacob Francis Tamme (/ˈtæmi/ TAM-ee; born March 15, 1985) is an American former professional football player who was a tight end in the National Football League (NFL). He played college football for the Kentucky Wildcats and was selected by the Indianapolis Colts in the fourth round of the 2008 NFL draft. Tamme also played for the Denver Broncos and Atlanta Falcons.

== Early life ==
Tamme graduated from Boyle County High School in Danville, Kentucky, where he was a multi-sport star in football, baseball, and basketball.

He was a four-year letterman and three-year starter at wide receiver and cornerback for Boyle County, who won four consecutive state championships, two in Class AA and two in Class AAA, and had a 58–2 record over those seasons. He was a first-team all-state selection as a senior by the Associated Press and Louisville's The Courier-Journal when he caught 46 passes for 797 yards, a 17.3-yard average, and 13 touchdowns. In addition, he was a finalist for the Kentucky "Mr. Football" Award, given to the top performer in high school football.

His career totals include 97 receptions for 1,866 yards, a 19.2-yard average, and 32 touchdowns. On defense, he intercepted 23 passes, including two returns for touchdowns. As a kick returner, he took 25 punts for 395 yards, a 15.8-yard average, and two touchdowns.

== College career ==
As a redshirt freshman, he played in all 11 games for the Kentucky Wildcats. He started three games at wide receiver before moving to his more natural position of tight end for the season-ending game at Tennessee, where he had two touchdowns. For the season, he had 16 catches for 161 yards. He was also named to the SEC Academic Honor Roll for excellent work in the classroom.

As a redshirt sophomore, he played in all 11 games, starting 10. He was second on the team in pass receptions with 29 catches for 253 yards and one touchdown. On special teams, he blocked punts against Louisville and Florida. He also earned a slot on the SEC Academic Honor Roll for the second straight year.

As a redshirt junior, he was voted to the All-SEC first-team by the SEC coaches and the Associated Press. He led SEC tight ends in receptions with 32, netting 386 receiving yards and two touchdowns. He made the SEC Academic Honor Roll for the third year in a row.

As a redshirt senior, he had 56 receptions for 619 yards and six touchdowns. For the second year in a row, he earned first-team All-SEC honors from both the Associated Press (unanimous decision) and coaches polls.

Tamme finished his career as Kentucky's all-time top pass-catching tight end and second in the history of all SEC tight ends with 133 catches for 1,417 yards.

=== Accolades ===
As one of the top scholar-athletes in the country, Tamme completed his degree in integrated strategic communications in only three years and earned his MBA just before entering the NFL.

Known for his contributions back to the community, in 2006, he was named to the National Good Works Team by the American Football Coaches Association, the SEC Community Service Team by the SEC Office, and to the Frank G. Ham Society of Character by UK Athletics.

In 2007, he was one of 15 finalists for the prestigious Draddy Trophy, which is presented to the top scholar athlete in the country. He gave the acceptance speech on behalf of the 15 finalists at the award ceremony in New York City.

Also in 2007, he was named the SEC Scholar Athlete of the Year and elected to the first-team Academic All-America squad by the College Sports Information Directors of America.

He was the 2007 recipient of the Bobby Bowden Award, a national honor presented by the Fellowship of Christian Athletes.

Tamme was inducted in 2018 to the University of Kentucky Athletics Hall of Fame.

== Professional career ==
Pre-draft measurables
Height	Weight	Arm length	Hand span	40-yard dash	10-yard split	20-yard split	20-yard shuttle	Three-cone drill	Vertical jump	Broad jump	Bench press
6 ft 3 1/2 in (1.92 m)	236 lb (107 kg)	33 1/8 in (0.84 m)	9 in (0.23 m)	4.58 s	1.56 s	2.62 s	4.27 s	6.99 s	30 in (0.76 m)	9 ft 1 in (2.77 m)	18 reps
All values from NFL Combine

=== Indianapolis Colts ===
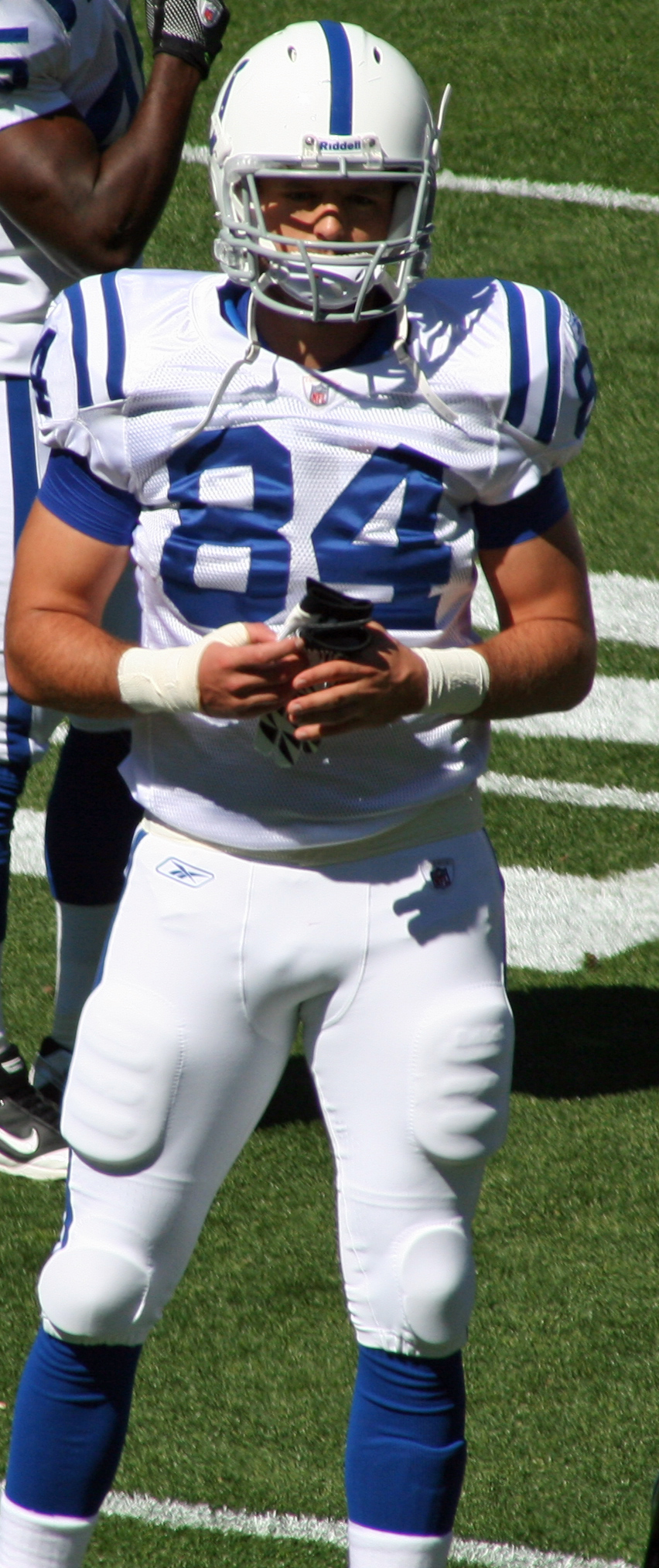
Tamme in 2010

The Indianapolis Colts selected Tamme in the fourth round (127th overall) of the 2008 NFL draft. Tamme was the ninth tight end drafted in 2008. He and the Colts agreed to a 4-year contract with undisclosed terms on July 23, 2008. As a rookie in 2008, Tamme appeared in 12 games and had three receptions for 12 receiving yards.

In 2009, Tamme appeared in all 16 games and started one. He totaled three receptions for 35 receiving yards. He played in Super Bowl XLIV but lost to the New Orleans Saints 31–17.

After Week 7 of the 2010 season, Dallas Clark was placed on Injured Reserve after an injury to the wrist and Tamme took over as the starting tight end. In Week 9, against the Philadelphia Eagles, he had 11 receptions for 108 receiving yards and one receiving touchdown in the 26–24 loss. Tamme finished the season with a career-high 67 receptions for 631 yards and four touchdowns.

Tamme's numbers declined in 2011 with the absence of Peyton Manning. He finished the year with 19 receptions for 177 receiving yards and a touchdown.

=== Denver Broncos ===
Tamme signed for three years and $9 million with the Denver Broncos on March 23, 2012. His contract included $3.5 million in guaranteed money. Tamme improved much in the 2012 season as Peyton Manning signed for the Broncos. Tamme finished the 2012 season with 52 receptions for 555 receiving yards and two touchdowns.

In 2013, Tamme was part of a Broncos offense that was franchise-setting, becoming the first time an NFL team scored over 600 points in 16 regular season games that year. For the 2013 year, Tamme produced 184 receiving yards and two touchdowns. Tamme scored a receiving touchdown in the AFC Championship victory over the New England Patriots. In the Super Bowl, Tamme had two catches for nine yards, but lost 43–8 to the Seattle Seahawks.

In 2014, Tamme played in 15 games and had 14 receptions for 109 yards and two touchdowns.

=== Atlanta Falcons ===
Tamme signed with the Atlanta Falcons on March 19, 2015. In Week 8, against the Tampa Bay Buccaneers, he had ten receptions for 103 receiving yards and one receiving touchdown. He finished the season with 59 catches for a career-high 657 yards and one touchdown.

Tamme was placed on injured reserve on November 21, 2016, after undergoing season-ending shoulder surgery. He finished the 2016 season with 22 receptions for 210 receiving yards and three touchdowns in eight games.

On November 23, 2017, Tamme announced his retirement from the NFL.

== NFL career statistics ==
Legend
**Bold**	Career high

=== Regular season ===
Year	Team	Games		Receiving					
Year	Team	GP	GS	Tgt	Rec	Yds	Avg	Lng	TD
2008	IND	12	0	5	3	12	4.0	6	0
2009	IND	**16**	1	10	3	35	**11.7**	21	0
2010	IND	**16**	**8**	**93**	**67**	631	9.4	30	**4**
2011	IND	**16**	5	31	19	177	9.3	29	1
2012	DEN	**16**	**8**	85	52	555	10.7	36	2
2013	DEN	**16**	1	25	20	184	9.2	15	1
2014	DEN	15	0	28	14	109	7.8	26	2
2015	ATL	15	**8**	81	59	**657**	11.1	**41**	1
2016	ATL	8	5	31	22	210	9.5	19	3
Career		130	36	389	259	2,570	9.9	41	14

=== Playoffs ===
Year	Team	Games		Receiving					
Year	Team	GP	GS	Tgt	Rec	Yds	Avg	Lng	TD
2008	IND	1	0	0	0	0	0.0	0	0
2009	IND	**3**	0	0	0	0	0.0	0	0
2010	IND	1	**1**	**8**	**5**	**46**	9.2	15	0
2012	DEN	1	0	3	3	44	**14.7**	21	0
2013	DEN	**3**	0	4	4	33	8.3	**23**	**1**
2014	DEN	1	0	0	0	0	0.0	0	0
Career		10	1	15	12	123	10.3	23	1

== Personal life ==
Tamme is a Christian. He has spoken about his faith saying, "My faith is important because it's the core of why I believe we exist as humans. Faith allows us to spend an eternity with God and it fuels my every day actions. I've seen how having faith in God can change lives and it certainly has changed mine."
