= WDFB-FM =

- Danville, Kentucky; United States
- Frequency: 88.1 MHz
- Branding: Lighthouse Radio Network

Programming
- Format: Christian radio

Ownership
- Owner: Alum Springs Educational Corporation

History
- First air date: 1992; 34 years ago

Technical information
- Licensing authority: FCC
- Facility ID: 1199
- Class: A
- ERP: 170 watts
- HAAT: 100.0 meters
- Transmitter coordinates: 37°35′46″N 84°50′19″W

Links
- Public license information: Public file; LMS
- Webcast: listen live
- Website: wdfb.com

WDFB-FM (88.1 FM) is a radio station broadcasting a Christian radio format. Licensed to Danville, Kentucky, United States. The station is currently owned by Alum Springs Educational Corporation.

== History ==
WDFB-FM went on-the-air in 1992 as a companion to AM station WDFB (1170). From its outset, it aired Gospel music.
