= Great American Brass Band Festival =

Coordinates: 37°38′39.7″N 84°46′41.3″W

The Great American Brass Band Festival is a music festival held each June in Danville, Kentucky since 1990. The open-air festival features a wide variety of brass bands, a hot air balloon race, a picnic, and other activities. Each year up to 40,000 people travel to the small town (population 15,000) for the event.

== Bands that have performed at the Festival ==
Bands that have performed at the event since 1990 include:

- 202nd Army Band (Kentucky Army National Guard), Frankfort, Kentucky (2002–2003, 2005–2006)
- 257th Army Band, Washington, DC (2003–2004)
- 8th Regiment Band, Rome, Georgia (2002–2003, 2006)
- Advocate Brass Band, Danville, Kentucky (1991–2012)
- Athena Brass Band Montgomery Village, Maryland (2005)
- Band of the Air Force Reserve, Robins AFB, Georgia (2002)
- Brass Band of Columbus, Columbus, Ohio (2007)
- BrassRoots, Mount Brydges, Ontario (2005)
- Boston Brass, (2006)
- Centre Trumpets, Danville, Kentucky (2005)
- Chicago Brass Band, Chicago, Illinois (2005, 2009)
- Cincinnati Brass Band, Cincinnati, Ohio (2002)
- Circle City Sidewalk Stompers (clown band), Indianapolis, Indiana (2002–2012)
- Danville Pipe Band, Danville, Kentucky (2003–2006)
- Dick Domek and the Walnut Street Ragtime Ramblers, Kentucky (2006)
- DiMartino/Osland Jazz Orchestra, Lexington, Kentucky (2005)
- Dixie Express (2002)
- Dixie Power Trio, Fredericksburg, Virginia (2002–2004)
- Dodworth Saxhorn Band, Ann Arbor, Michigan (2005)
- Euphouria (tuba/euphonium quartet), Cookeville, Tennessee (2002–2006)
- Federal City Brass Band, Baltimore, Maryland (2004)
- Fountain City Brass Band, Kansas City, Missouri (2008, 2010)
- Franconian Harmonics, Estenfeld, Germany (2004)
- Great Olympian Trad. Jazz Band, New Orleans, Louisiana (2005–2006)
- Indiana Wind Symphony, Indianapolis, Indiana (2006, 2011)
- Intrada Brass Band, Oakville, Ontario (2004)
- James Madison University Brass Band, Harrisonburg, Virginia (2006)
- Kentuckiana Brass and Percussion Ensemble, Kentucky/Indiana (1990)
- Lexington Brass Band, Lexington, Kentucky (2003, 2006)
- London Citadel Brass Band, London, Ontario (2006)
- Madison Community Band, Richmond, Kentucky (2012, 2016)
- Main Street Brass, Cynthiana, Kentucky (2002–2003)
- Millennium Brass Quintet (2002, 2004, 2006)
- Mississauga Temple Band, Mississauga, Ontario (2003)
- Mr. Jack Daniel's Silver Cornet Band, Murfreesboro, Tennessee (2004)
- Munich Trumpet Ensemble, Munich, Germany (2002)
- Musikverein Herforst 1933 e.V., Herforst, Germany (2000, 2002)
- National Capital Band of the S.A., Washington, DC (2005)
- New Columbian Wind Band (2002)
- Ohio Wheelmen, Findley, Ohio (2005–2006)
- Olde Towne Brass, Huntsville, Alabama (2002–2003)
- Olympia Brass Band, New Orleans, Louisiana (2002–2004)
- Piedmont Trombone Society, Atlanta, Georgia (2006)
- Rhythm & Brass, Waco, Texas (2005–2006)
- Saxton's Cornet Band, Kentucky (2004–2006)
- Sierra del Mar Divisional Band, San Diego, California (2004)
- Southern Territorial Band of the Salvation Army, Atlanta, Georgia (2002)
- St. James Tripolians Steel Orchestra, Trinidad (2002)
- The Disneyland Band (2002)
- The Federal City Brass Band, Baltimore, Maryland (2004)
- The Hellcats, West Point, New York (2003)
- The U.S. Air Force Band of Flight, Wright-Patterson AFB, Ohio (2004)
- The U.S. Coast Guard Band, New London, Connecticut (2003)
- U.S. Marine Band Brass Quintet, Washington, DC (2002)
- Triangle Youth Band, Raleigh, North Carolina (2003)
- Village Brass, Columbus, Ohio (2003)

== Other musicians and featured appearances ==
- Allen Vizzutti, Mercer Island, Washington (2005)
- Steve Sykes, Shepton Mallet, Somerset, UK (2001)
- Daniel Rodriguez, New York, New York (2002)
- Patricia Backhaus, Waukesha, Wisconsin (2005)
- Frederick Fennell, 1914–2004 (2001)
- Jens Lindemann, Los Angeles, California (2006)
- Scott Kirby, Sandpoint, Idaho (2003–2005)
- Steven Mead, Fenny Drayton, Warks, UK (2005)
- The Wheelmen, Ohio (2003–2004)
