= John Fetterman (reporter) =

American journalist (1920–1975)

- Born: February 25, 1920; Danville, Kentucky, U.S.
- Died: June 21, 1975 (aged 55); Louisville, Kentucky U.S.
- Occupation: Journalist
- Known for: Winning several Pulitzer Prizes

John Fetterman (February 25, 1920 – June 21, 1975) was an American journalist, a reporter for The Courier-Journal of Louisville, Kentucky. He won the Pulitzer Prize for local, general, or spot-news reporting for his 1968 story "Pfc. Gibson Comes Home", about the death of a soldier in Vietnam and the return of his body. It focused on (James T. Gibson) the young man's family in Knott County, Kentucky and the wider community. Fetterman also contributed to a Courier-Journal series on strip mining that won a Pulitzer Prize in 1967.

== Early life and education ==
Born in Danville, Kentucky, Fetterman served in the U.S. Navy before enrolling at Murray State University under the G.I. Bill. After his graduation in 1949, he served on the staffs of the Murray Ledger and Times and the Nashville Tennessean. After graduate school at the University of Kentucky, Fetterman joined the staff of the Louisville, Kentucky, newspaper.

== Journalism career ==
He was the author of the 1967 book Stinking Creek, about life around the creek of the same name in Knox County, Kentucky.

Fetterman's freelance writing also appeared in The Saturday Evening Post, National Geographic, Time, and Life.

Fetterman died from a heart attack in Louisville on June 21, 1975. His daughter Mindy, also a journalist, is known for her work as a reporter, columnist and financial editor of USA Today, and in 2008 wrote a follow-up story to Stinking Creek about the present conditions of the area.
