= Stephen Rolfe Powell =

American glass artist (1951–2019)

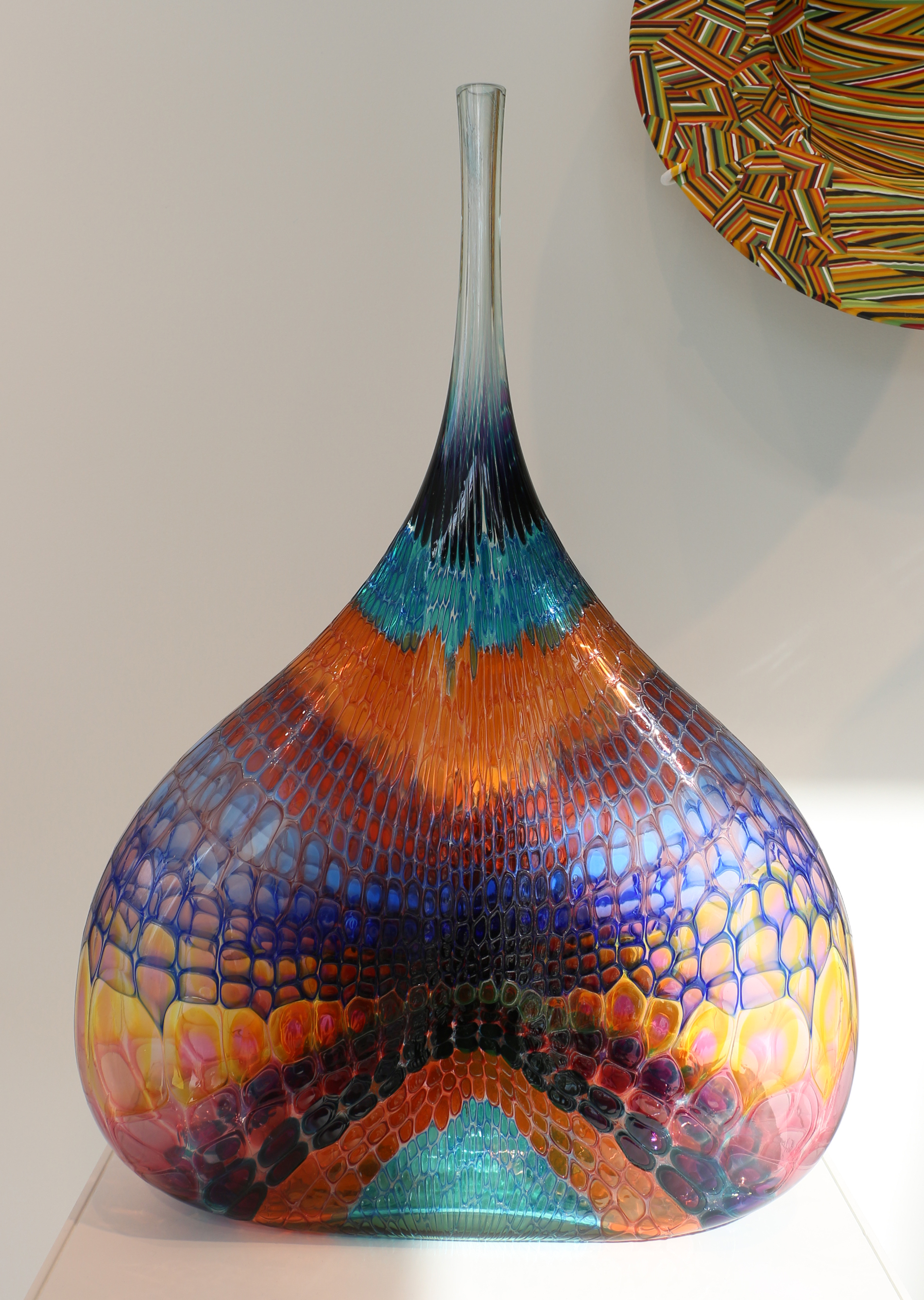
- Hendrix Sigh Johnson, Vase, 1992
- Born: November 26, 1951; Birmingham, Alabama
- Died: March 16, 2019 (aged 67); Boyle County, Kentucky
- Education: Centre College (BA); Louisiana State University (MFA)
- Known for: Glassblowing

Stephen "Steve" Rolfe Powell (November 26, 1951 – March 16, 2019) was an American glass artist based at Centre College in Danville, Kentucky, where he taught for more than 30 years. He often created elaborately colored three-foot glass vessels incorporating murrine.

== Early life and education ==
Powell was born November 26, 1951, in Birmingham, Alabama, to Anne and Arnold Powell. His father, who died in 1988 prior to the height of Powell's career, was a playwright and taught at Birmingham–Southern College, and his mother was a university administrator. He also had a sister, Pam. After receiving a Bachelor of Arts in painting and ceramics at Centre College in 1974, he worked as an art instructor at Draper State Prison, then at Indian Springs School. Powell pursued a Master of Fine Arts in ceramics at Louisiana State University in 1980–1983. While there, Powell had his first experience in glass blowing.

== Career ==
Powell dabbled in glass at the Penland School of Crafts and the Haystack Mountain School of Crafts but credits his time at Summervail Workshop for Art and Critical Studies at Colorado Mountain College as what solidifying his interest in glass. Though he was hired by Centre College in 1983 to teach ceramics and sculpture, he quickly founded the university's glass program and established its first studio on the roof of a campus building. In 1997, Powell designed and created a new glass studio, which Centre opened as part of their new Jones Visual Arts Center the following year. The studio's development was thanks in part to Corning Glass in Harrodsburg, Philips Lighting in Danville, and Corhart in Louisville, who provided help and materials.

In 1985, Powell was briefly an assistant to Dan Dailey and Lino Tagliapietra at the Pilchuck Glass School. In 1990, Powell taught and studied at the Muhkina Glass Institute in Leningrad and the Lvov Glass Factory and Art Institute in Ukraine. Little was known about Soviet glassmaking prior to his visit and he was the first American to be allowed to enter many of these spaces. Powell also co-produced "Lino Tagliapietra: Glass Maestro" in 2000 and published Stephen Rolfe Powell: Glassmaker a book about his career thus far, in 2007. In 2004, he became a founding member of the Community Arts Center, now called Art Center of the Bluegrass. Powell was also vice-president of the Glass Art Society.

In 1991, he severed nine tendons, an artery, and a nerve in his hand after putting his hand through a windowpane while shooing a pigeon from his studio. Though this threatened to end his career, he underwent surgery and extensive physical therapy and was back at work in three months.

Powell was given a number of awards throughout his career, including: Kentucky's Teacher of the Year award from the Council for Advancement and Support of Education and the Carnegie Foundation for the Advancement of Teaching (1999, 2000); the Acorn Award from the Kentucky Council on Postsecondary Education (2004); and the Distinguished Educator award from the James Renwick Alliance (2012). Among Powell's former students are Ché Rhodes, founder of the glass program at University of Louisville; Jackson Hawkins, assistant professor of glass at Southern Illinois University in Carbondale; and Patrick Martin, former head of the glass program at Emporia State University.

Powell's work is displayed in a number of places, including the Smithsonian American Art Museum, Speed Art Museum, Cincinnati Art Museum, Maker’s Mark Distillery, Tennessee Aquarium, Hermitage Museum, and KMAC Museum. In 2002, his work was exhibited at the Winter Olympics in Salt Lake City, Utah.

A large collection of Powell's work remains in Danville, in the GLASS National Art Museum at Art Center of the Bluegrass. Pieces in the Art Center's collection are on display in several galleries in the museum, where admission is free.

== Death and legacy ==
In lieu of presents at their wedding, Powell and his wife Shelley asked for donations to the Southern Poverty Law Center. The couple designed their Danville house and have two children: Piper and Oliver. Powell believed he was a direct descendent of Pocahontas and drew inspiration from this connection. He died unexpectedly on March 16, 2019, at his home in Danville, Kentucky.

Centre College dedicated the Stephen R. Powell Memorial Garden and Outdoor Classroom in October 2022. The centerpiece, a large glass sculpture, was built by former students and collaborators. In 2023, the Art Center of the Bluegrass announced an expansion project to start a glass museum and gallery in his honor.
