= Danville Schools =

School district in Kentucky, United States

Danville Independent Schools

Address
- 115 E. Lexington Ave Danville, Kentucky, 40422; United States

District information
- Type: Public
- Motto: Our mission is to provide authentic experiences that embrace diverse interests and prepare lifelong learners.
- Grades: K–12
- Superintendent: Ron Ballard

Students and staff
- Students: 1,850
- Teachers: 130
- Staff: 350

Other information
- Website: www.danvilleschools.net

Danville Independent Schools is a school district located in Danville, Kentucky. The district includes most of the boundaries of the city of Danville, about 15 square miles (39 km^{2}) in size. It comprises a primary school, intermediate school, one middle school, and one high school and provides educational programs for about 1,850 students.

The district employs around 350 professional and support staff, of which over 130 are teaching staff. It operates with a budget over $20,000,000. Taxes and other local revenues account for approximately 70% of the budget.

== Schools ==
=== High school ===
- Danville High School (9–12) 550 students

=== Middle school ===
- John W. Bate Middle School (6–8) 430 students

=== Elementary schools ===
- Mary G. Hogsett Primary (PK–1) 300 students
- Edna L. Toliver Intermediate (2–5) 600 students

== Elementary consolidation ==
The school district formerly had three elementary schools, however at the start of the 2018/19 school year a primary school, and an intermediate school opened. Talks of this had been going on since the 1990s, however the plans had fallen through. During a board meeting in the 2013/14 school year, the plans were restored, as the board decided to consolidate their elementary schools into a primary and intermediate school. They picked Edna L. Toliver Elementary School to host the intermediate grades because it was the biggest elementary school. Construction to add on and renovate the school began in the spring of 2016 and was completed in the summer of 2018. Jennie Rogers Elementary and Mary G. Hogsett Elementary remained as candidates to host the primary school. This sparked a debate about which school would be a better host for the primary school. After much consideration in the fall of 2017, Mary G. Hogsett was selected to host the primary school. This meant that the Board of Education would move into the Jennie Rogers building. Jennie Rogers Elementary School closed in May 2018, after being open for 53 years. However Hogsett needed renovations to suit primary students. The renovations would last a little over a year, so the Jennie Rogers building served as Mary G. Hogsett Primary School for the 2018/19 school year. Originally, Jennie Rogers was to be Danville Schools' new central office, but over the 2018/19 school year, the school district bought the American National University campus building, right beside Danville High School. Over the summer of 2019, this building was renovated as the district's new central office. Later that summer, Mary G. Hogsett reopened as the primary school. The Jennie Rogers building is now a community center.

== Board of education ==
The Board of Education has five at-large members. The current members of the Board of Education are:

- Esther Rugerio, Board Chair
- Jennifer Pusateri, Board Vice Chair
- Glenn Ball
- Steve Becker
- Leigh Ranson

The Superintendent also attends the meetings. Currently Ron Ballard is the superintendent.
