= Travis Leffew =

American football player (born 1983)

No. 60
- Position: Guard / Tackle

Personal information
- Born: January 27, 1983 (age 43); Danville, Kentucky, U.S.
- Listed height: 6 ft 4 in (1.93 m)
- Listed weight: 325 lb (147 kg)

Career information
- College: Louisville
- NFL draft: 2006: undrafted

Career history
- Chicago Bears (2006)*; Green Bay Packers (2006)*; Dallas Cowboys (2006); Green Bay Packers (2006–2007)*; Atlanta Falcons (2007)*; Kansas City Chiefs (2007); Cleveland Browns (2008)*
- * Offseason or practice squad member only

Awards and highlights
- Third-team All-American (2004); Second-team All-American (2005); 3 KHSAA State Championships (1999, 2000, 2001); Second-team All-Conference USA (2003); First-team All-Conference USA (2004); All-Big East (2005)

Travis Leffew (born January 27, 1983) is an American former professional football player who was an offensive lineman in the National Football League (NFL). He played college football for the Louisville Cardinals and was signed by the Chicago Bears as an undrafted free agent in 2006.

Leffew was also a member of the Green Bay Packers, Dallas Cowboys, Atlanta Falcons, Kansas City Chiefs, and Cleveland Browns.

Leffew is currently the assistant head coach of Kentucky 4A power Boyle County at which he formerly played, and has won several state championships. Leffew was also at one point the Head Coach at the local Lincoln County High School in Stanford, Kentucky.

== College career ==
=== Awards and honors ===
- 3 KHSAA State Championships
- Second-team All-Conference USA (2003)
- First-team All-Conference USA (2004)
- Third-team All-American (2004)
- Academic All-Big East (2005)
- All-Big East (2005)
- Second-team All-American (2005)
