= Danville, Kentucky =

- City
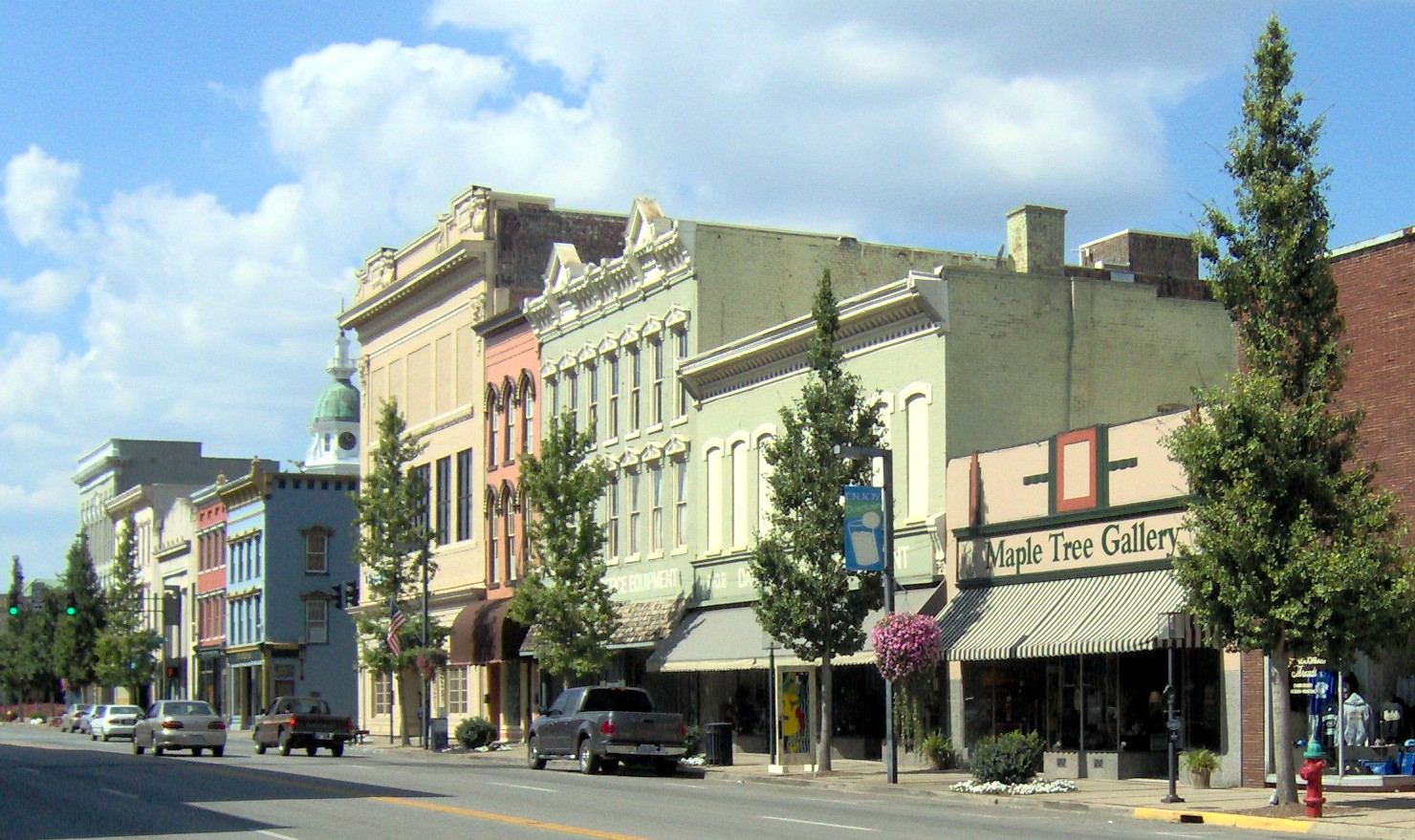
- Downtown Danville

- Flag Seal Logo
- Nicknames: "The City of Firsts"; "Birthplace of the Bluegrass"; "Title Town"
- Location of Danville in Boyle County, Kentucky.

- Location within Kentucky Location within the United States
- Coordinates: 37°38′45″N 84°46′21″W
- Country: United States
- State: Kentucky
- County: Boyle
- Settled: 1783
- Incorporated: 1787

Government
  - Type: Council–manager
  - Mayor: James (J.H.) Atkins
  - City Manager: Earl Coffey
  - Commissioners: Kevin Caudill; Jennie Hollon; Donna Peek; Rick Serres

Area
  - Total: 17.28 sq mi (44.76 km^{2})
  - Land: 17.18 sq mi (44.50 km^{2})
  - Water: 0.10 sq mi (0.26 km^{2})
- Elevation: 958 ft (292 m)

Population (2020)
  - Total: 17,234
  - Estimate (2022): 17,303
  - Density: 1,003.1/sq mi (387.29/km^{2})
- Time zone: UTC−5 (EST)
  - Summer (DST): UTC−4 (EDT)
- ZIP codes: 40422-40423
- Area code: 859
- FIPS code: 21-19882
- GNIS feature ID: 2404185
- Website: danvilleky.gov

Danville is a home rule-class city in and the county seat of Boyle County, Kentucky, United States. The population was 17,236 at the 2020 census. Danville is the principal city of the Danville Micropolitan Statistical Area, which includes all of the Boyle and Lincoln counties. In 2001, Danville received a Great American Main Street Award from the National Trust for Historic Preservation. Centre College in Danville was selected to host U.S. vice-presidential debates in 2000 and 2012.

== History ==
Within Kentucky, Danville is called the "City of Firsts":

- It housed the first courthouse in Kentucky.
- The first Kentucky constitution was written and signed here.
- It was the first capital of Kentucky.
- It had the first U.S. post office west of the Allegheny Mountains.
- It hosts the first state-supported school for the deaf.
- Ephraim McDowell completed the first known successful laparotomy here in 1809, removing an ovarian tumor from a woman patient without anesthesia.
- It is the home of Centre College, housing the oldest college administration building and campus west of the Allegheny Mountains.

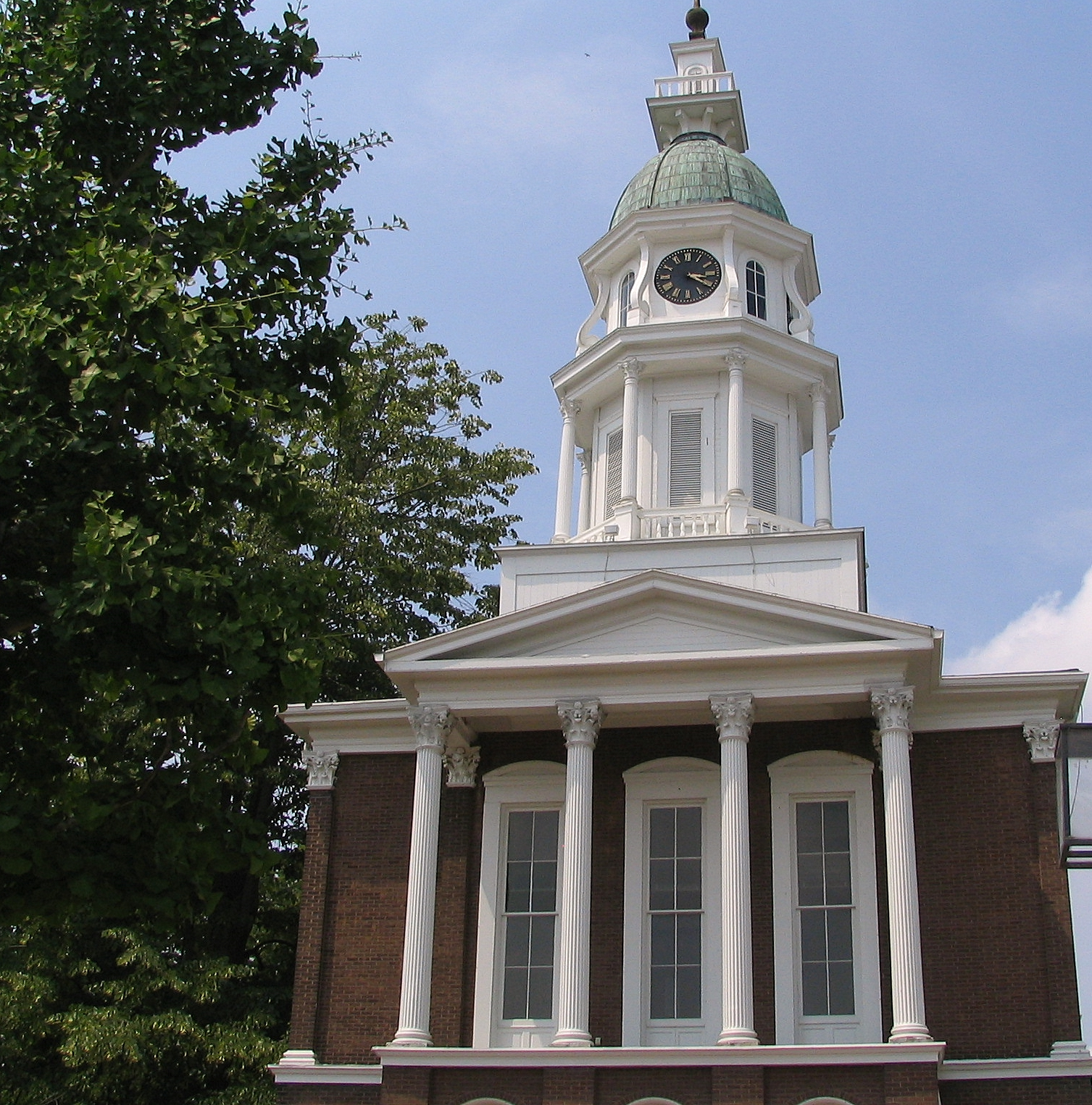
Boyle County Courthouse in Danville

Danville was part of the Great Settlement Area around Fort Harrod (present-day Harrodsburg), which was first settled in 1774. The site was originally known as Crow's Station for settler John Crow, but the town was surveyed and platted by Walker Daniel, Kentucky's first district attorney, who bought 76 acres (31 ha) near the Wilderness Road from Crow in 1783. The city was named for Daniel. The Virginia legislature officially established Danville on December 4, 1787.

Between 1784 and 1792, ten conventions were held in Danville to petition for better governance and ultimately to secure independence from Virginia. In 1786 the Danville Political Club was organized. It met each Saturday night at Grayson's Tavern to discuss the political, economic, and social concerns of the day. After a state constitution was adopted and separation was confirmed in 1792, the town ceased to be of statewide importance. Its leading citizens moved elsewhere.

Transylvania University was founded in Danville in 1783. It moved to Lexington in 1789. Centre College was founded in 1819. Danville Theological Seminary was founded in 1853; in 1901 it became part of the Louisville Presbyterian Theological Seminary. The Caldwell Institute for Young Ladies was founded in 1860. It became Caldwell Female College in 1876, Caldwell College in 1904, Kentucky College for Women in 1913, and merged into Centre College in 1926.

In November 1806, Meriwether Lewis, co-leader of the Lewis and Clark Expedition, visited Danville while traveling the Wilderness Road to Washington, D.C., to report on the expedition, which had returned from the Pacific Coast. In December 1806, William Clark visited his nephews in school in Danville before following Lewis to Washington.

The first school in Danville for African-American children was founded around 1840 by Willis Russell, an emancipated slave of Robert Craddock, a Revolutionary War veteran. Craddock deeded a log house in Danville to Russell. He moved to the town after Craddock's death and started a school for children. The house on Walnut Street no longer stands, though what was once believed to be his house is now the Willis Russell Memorial Cabin. Russell's house stood across the street, opposite St. James African American Methodist Church.

In 1842, Boyle County was formed from southern Mercer County and northern Lincoln County. Danville became its county seat.

In 1850, Danville and Boyle County backed construction of the Lexington and Danville Railroad. Money ran out when the railroad reached Nicholasville. John A. Roebling had already built towers for a railroad suspension bridge over the Kentucky River. (Roebling lived in Danville during the construction.) Despite the railroad not being completed to Danville, the county still owed the company $150,000. It completed payment on time in 1884.

In 1860, a fire devastated the city, destroying 64 buildings and causing more than $300,000 in damages. Boyle County's courthouse was destroyed; its replacement was completed in 1862.

After the Union Army won the Battle of Perryville in the Civil War on October 8, 1862, it appropriated many Danville buildings, including the courthouse, for use as hospitals. On October 11, a Union force drove Confederate forces from the county fairgrounds through Danville.

In May 1864, the group of 250 – mostly enslaved males but including some freedmen – marched from Danville to nearby Camp Nelson in Jessamine County, where Colonel Andrew Clark allowed them to enlist In the Union Army after some initial hesitation. Arriving with wounds inflicted upon them en route, this group was the first to enlist at this site, where 10,000 United States Colored Troops trained.

In 1775, Archibald McNeill planted Kentucky's first recorded hemp crop at Clark's Run Creek near Danville. By 1889 Boyle County was one of the ten Kentucky counties which together produced more than 90% of the US yield. It was the state's largest cash crop until 1915, when it lost its market to imported jute.

From the turn of the 20th century through the 1960s, Danville was home to a thriving African-American business sector located on and around 2nd Street on the western edge of what is now Constitution Square Historic Site. The city demolished this business sector under urban renewal in the 1970s to provide for the expansion of Constitution Square Park.

On October 5, 2000, Dick Cheney and Senator Joe Lieberman, candidates for Vice President of the United States, debated at Centre College during the 2000 presidential election. On October 11, 2012, Centre College again hosted the Vice-Presidential debate, this time between Vice President Joe Biden and Wisconsin Representative Paul Ryan.

== Geography ==
Danville is located in eastern Boyle County.

According to the United States Census Bureau, the city has a total area of 15.9 square miles (41.2 km^{2}), of which 15.8 square miles (41.0 km^{2}) is land and 0.077 square miles (0.2 km^{2}), or 0.58%, is water.

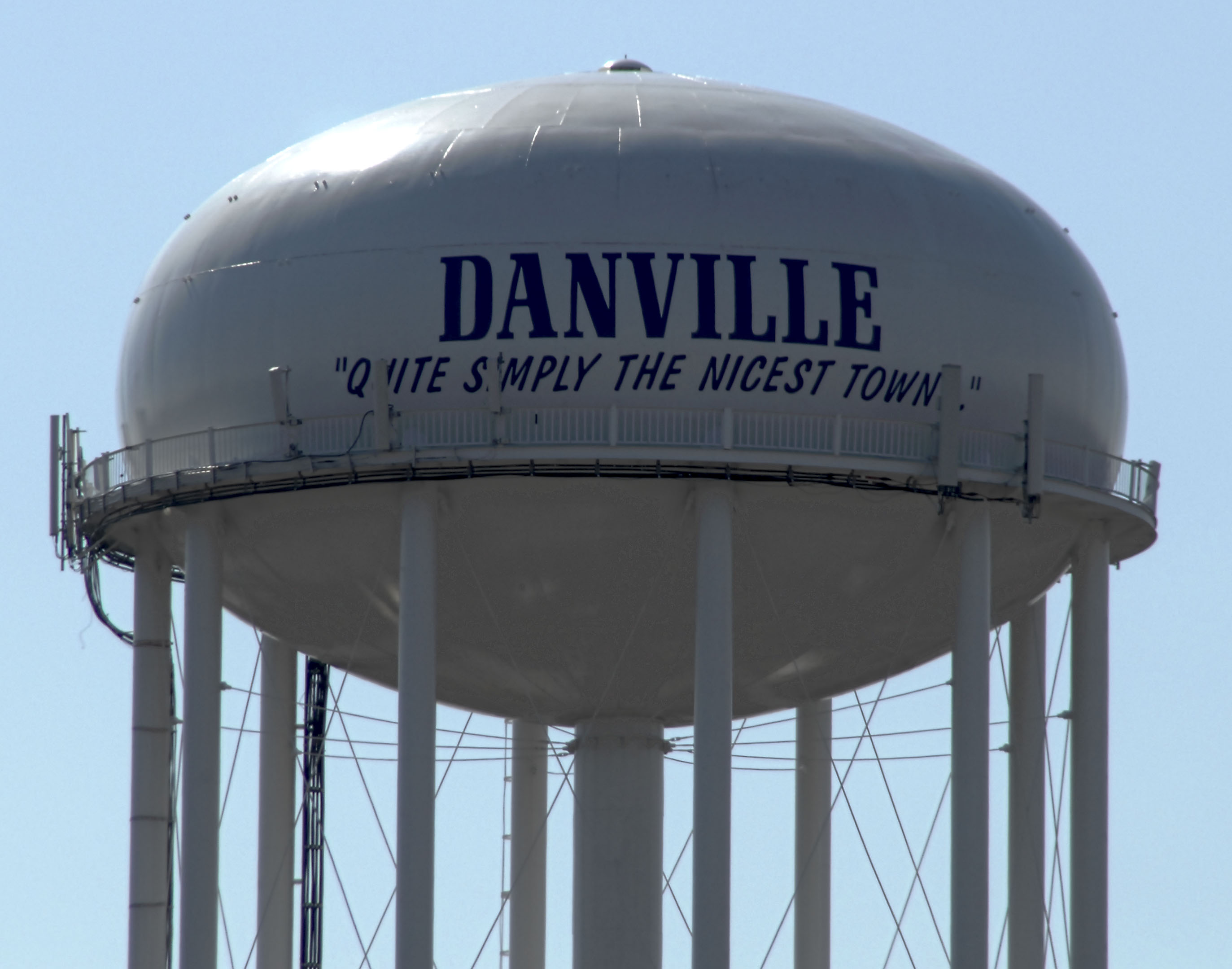
Danville, Kentucky Water Tower viewed from the north. Features the motto "Quite Simply the Nicest Town"

== Transportation ==
Bus

Blue Grass Community Action Partnership provides DanTran bus service inside Danville. BGCAP also connects Danville with Lexington, Stanford, Junction City, and Lancaster.

Road

- U.S. Route 127 bisects Danville northwest (Harrodsburg) to south (Liberty).
- U.S. Route 150 bisects Danville west (Perryville, Springfield) to southeast (Stanford).
- U.S. Route 127 Bypass encircles the Danville from on the west and south. It runs concurrently with U.S. Route 150 Bypass from its southernmost point to the U.S. Route 150 intersection.
- U.S. Route 150 Bypass encircles Danville on the west and south. It runs concurrently with U.S. Route 127 Bypass from the intersection with U.S. Route 127 to its westernmost point.
- Kentucky Route 33 enters Danville from north (Burgin, Versailles).
- Kentucky Route 34 connects Danville northeast to U.S. Route 27 and on to Lexington.
- Kentucky Route 37 connects Danville west to Kentucky Route 243 near Penn's Store.
- Kentucky Route 52 connects Danville east to Lancaster.
- Kentucky Route 2168 connects U.S. Route 127 with Kentucky Route 34 north of Danville.

Air

Stuart Powell Field (DVK), 3 miles (5 km) from downtown, serves as Danville's general aviation airport. Blue Grass Airport (LEX) in Lexington, 35 miles (56 km) away, provides the closest commercial service. More extensive commercial service is available from Louisville International Airport (SDF), 82 miles (132 km) away, and Cincinnati/Northern Kentucky International Airport (CVG), 127 miles (204 km) away.

Rail

Norfolk Southern Railway operates a freight rail yard in Danville. Its Louisville-Chattanooga line intersects with its Cincinnati-Chattanooga line just north of Danville.

== Climate ==
Danville has a humid subtropical climate (Köppen Cfa), with hot summers and moderately cold winters. Precipitation is abundant and well-spread, with an average of 47.85 inches (1,220 mm).

Climate data for Danville, Kentucky (1991–2020 normals, extremes 1933–2020)
Month	Jan	Feb	Mar	Apr	May	Jun	Jul	Aug	Sep	Oct	Nov	Dec	Year
Record high °F (°C)	79 (26)	79 (26)	87 (31)	90 (32)	95 (35)	107 (42)	103 (39)	105 (41)	104 (40)	96 (36)	83 (28)	78 (26)	107 (42)
Mean maximum °F (°C)	64.1 (17.8)	68.0 (20.0)	75.8 (24.3)	82.0 (27.8)	87.9 (31.1)	92.6 (33.7)	94.2 (34.6)	93.9 (34.4)	91.3 (32.9)	83.9 (28.8)	73.9 (23.3)	66.0 (18.9)	96.3 (35.7)
Mean daily maximum °F (°C)	42.7 (5.9)	47.1 (8.4)	56.3 (13.5)	67.5 (19.7)	75.4 (24.1)	83.4 (28.6)	86.5 (30.3)	86.0 (30.0)	80.2 (26.8)	68.6 (20.3)	55.8 (13.2)	46.1 (7.8)	66.3 (19.1)
Daily mean °F (°C)	33.0 (0.6)	36.4 (2.4)	44.8 (7.1)	55.5 (13.1)	64.7 (18.2)	72.4 (22.4)	75.9 (24.4)	74.8 (23.8)	68.5 (20.3)	56.7 (13.7)	44.9 (7.2)	37.1 (2.8)	55.4 (13.0)
Mean daily minimum °F (°C)	23.3 (−4.8)	25.8 (−3.4)	33.3 (0.7)	43.6 (6.4)	54.1 (12.3)	61.4 (16.3)	65.3 (18.5)	63.7 (17.6)	56.8 (13.8)	44.8 (7.1)	34.0 (1.1)	28.0 (−2.2)	44.5 (6.9)
Mean minimum °F (°C)	3.7 (−15.7)	9.1 (−12.7)	16.7 (−8.5)	27.9 (−2.3)	39.6 (4.2)	49.6 (9.8)	57.4 (14.1)	55.2 (12.9)	42.9 (6.1)	31.1 (−0.5)	19.2 (−7.1)	15.3 (−9.3)	−0.2 (−17.9)
Record low °F (°C)	−20 (−29)	−18 (−28)	−6 (−21)	17 (−8)	27 (−3)	41 (5)	47 (8)	42 (6)	32 (0)	21 (−6)	−3 (−19)	−18 (−28)	−20 (−29)
Average precipitation inches (mm)	3.68 (93)	3.69 (94)	4.61 (117)	4.21 (107)	4.42 (112)	4.66 (118)	5.00 (127)	3.18 (81)	3.72 (94)	3.47 (88)	3.01 (76)	4.20 (107)	47.85 (1,215)
Average precipitation days (≥ 0.01 in)	11.2	10.9	11.7	11.1	11.4	10.6	10.5	9.0	7.3	8.7	9.2	11.5	123.1
Source: NOAA

== Demographics ==
Historical population
Census	Pop.	Note	%±
1800	270		—
1810	432		60.0%
1830	849		—
1840	1,223		44.1%
1850	2,150		75.8%
1860	4,962		130.8%
1870	2,542		−48.8%
1880	3,074		20.9%
1890	3,766		22.5%
1900	4,285		13.8%
1910	5,420		26.5%
1920	5,699		5.1%
1930	6,729		18.1%
1940	6,734		0.1%
1950	8,686		29.0%
1960	9,010		3.7%
1970	11,542		28.1%
1980	12,942		12.1%
1990	12,420		−4.0%
2000	15,477		24.6%
2010	16,218		4.8%
2020	17,234		6.3%
2024 (est.)	17,562		1.9%
U.S. Decennial Census

=== 2020 census ===
As of the 2020 census, Danville had a population of 17,234. The median age was 38.6 years. 20.5% of residents were under the age of 18 and 20.1% of residents were 65 years of age or older. For every 100 females there were 87.5 males, and for every 100 females age 18 and over there were 83.8 males age 18 and over.

98.7% of residents lived in urban areas, while 1.3% lived in rural areas.

There were 6,887 households in Danville, of which 27.7% had children under the age of 18 living in them. Of all households, 40.0% were married-couple households, 17.2% were households with a male householder and no spouse or partner present, and 35.7% were households with a female householder and no spouse or partner present. About 34.3% of all households were made up of individuals and 15.5% had someone living alone who was 65 years of age or older.

There were 7,579 housing units, of which 9.1% were vacant. The homeowner vacancy rate was 2.7% and the rental vacancy rate was 8.9%.

Racial composition as of the 2020 census
Race	Number	Percent
White	13,430	77.9%
Black or African American	1,759	10.2%
American Indian and Alaska Native	39	0.2%
Asian	283	1.6%
Native Hawaiian and Other Pacific Islander	4	0.0%
Some other race	437	2.5%
Two or more races	1,282	7.4%
Hispanic or Latino (of any race)	944	5.5%

=== 2010 census ===
As of the 2010 census, there were 16,218 people, 6,405 households, and 3,903 families residing in the city. The population density was 1,020.0/sq mi (393.8/km^{2}). There were 7,180 housing units at an average density of 451.6/sq mi (174.4/km^{2}). The racial makeup of the city was 83.2% White, 10.9% African American, 0.2% Native American, 1.0% Asian, 1.8% from other races, and 2.8% from two or more races. Hispanics or Latinos of any race were 3.9% of the population.

Of the 6,405 households, 25.7% had children under the age of 18 living with them, 43.1% were married couples living together, 14.7% had a female householder with no husband present, and 37.8% were non-families. 33.0% of all households were made up of individuals, and 14.8% had someone living alone who was 65 years of age or older. The average household size was 2.25 and the average family size was 2.83.

20.8% of the population was under the age of 18, 61.8% from 18 to 64, and 18.0% who were 65 years of age or older. The median age was 39.4 years. Females made up 54.4% and males made up 45.6% of the population aged 18 or older.

=== 2000 census ===
As of 2000, the median income for a household was US $32,938, and the median income for a family was $40,528. Males had a median income of $35,327 versus $24,542 for females. The per capita income was $18,906. About 9.4% of families and 12.4% of the population were below the poverty line, including 17.6% of those under age 18 and 10.5% of those age 65 or over.

=== Crime ===
FBI crime statistics for 2009 list the crime rate (per 100,000 population) for Danville as follows:

Crime	Danville	Kentucky	United States
Violent crime	258	260	429
Murder	0	4	5
Forcible rape	32	35	29
Robbery	84	84	133
Aggravated assault	142	135	269
Property crime	3,587	2,513	3,061
Burglary	876	689	716
Larceny-theft	2,627	1,683	2,061
Motor vehicle theft	84	141	259

== Education ==
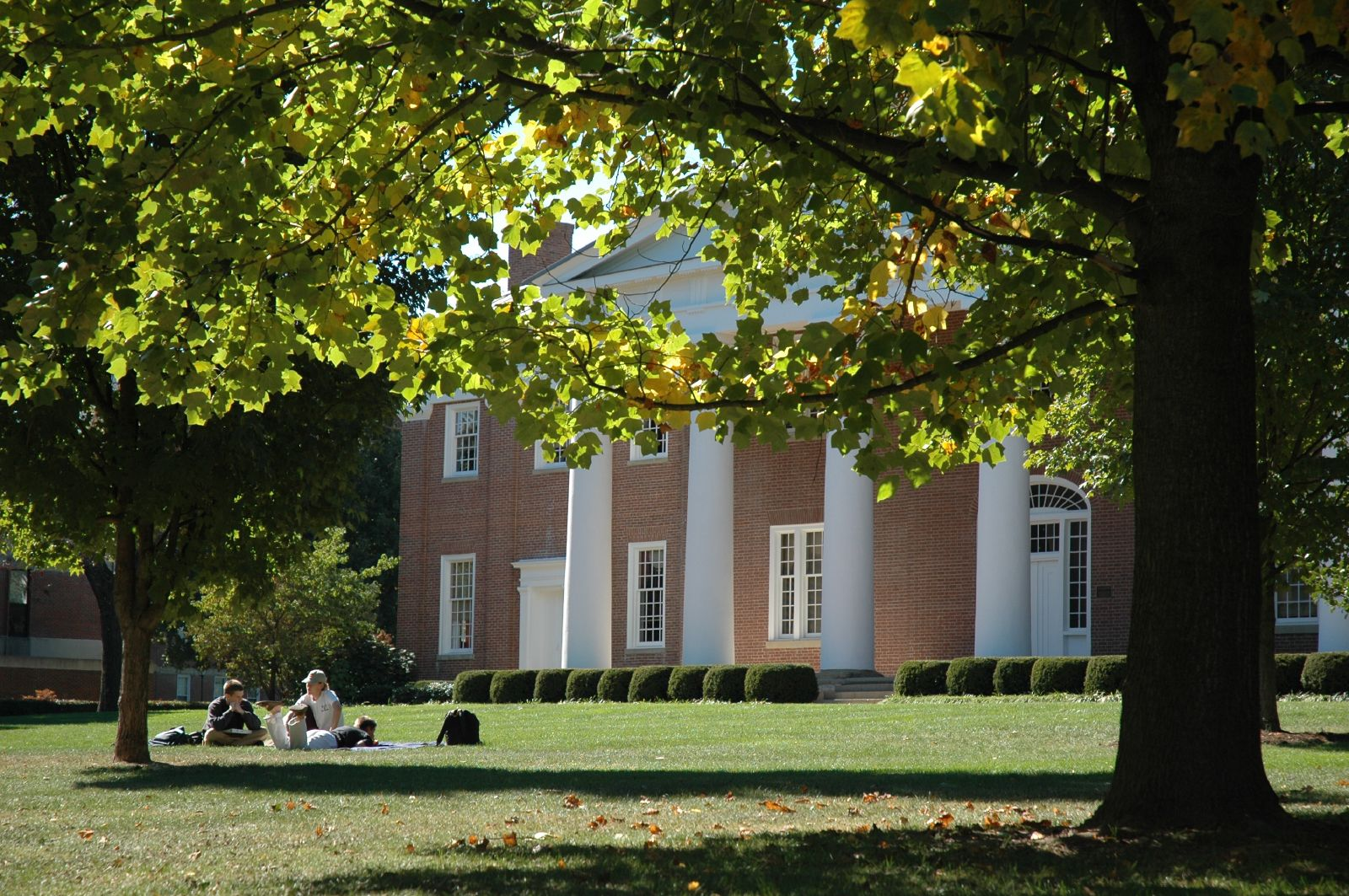
Centre College

Public schools

Danville Schools includes most of the city limits. It operates Mary G. Hogsett Primary School, Edna L. Toliver Intermediate School, John W. Bate Middle School, and Danville High School for the city of Danville. Boyle County Schools operates Woodlawn Elementary School, Junction City Elementary School, Perryville Elementary School, Boyle County Middle School, and Boyle County High School for portions of Danville and the remainder of Boyle County. Kentucky School for the Deaf provides education to Kentucky's deaf and hard-of-hearing children from elementary through high school.

A portion of Danville is in the Boyle County Schools district.

Private schools

Two private schools operate in Danville:

- Danville Christian Academy
- Danville Montessori School

Colleges and universities

Centre College, a nationally recognized liberal arts college, is located in Danville. Six other colleges and universities have (or had) campuses in Danville:

- American National University, Danville campus closed in 2019.
- Bluegrass Community and Technical College
- Eastern Kentucky University, Danville campus closed in May 2018
- Midway University, Danville campus is closed
- Kentucky College for Women, merged with Centre College in 1930.
- Transylvania University, moved to Lexington Kentucky in 1789.

Public library

Danville has a lending library, the Boyle County Public Library.

== Culture ==
On March 2, 2010, Danville voted to go "wet" (to permit sale of packaged alcohol and sale of alcohol by the drink without restriction by size of premises).

=== Places of interest ===
- Art Center of the Bluegrass is in the historic Beaux Arts building, formerly the Federal Building, that is a hub for local artist activity.
- Centre College is a top liberal arts college; it hosted the 2000 and 2012 Vice Presidential debates.
- Central Kentucky Wildlife Refuge is a 160-acre (65 ha) nature preserve.
- Confederate Monument was an early 20th-century statue dedicated to Kentucky's Civil War veterans; in 2021, it was moved to Meade County, Kentucky.
- Constitution Square is a park containing restored and recreated frontier buildings; the first Kentucky constitution was written and signed here. In February 2013, the Kentucky Historical Society erected a historical marker in the square to commemorate the African-Americans who enlisted in the Union Army during the Civil War.
- Crow-Barbee House is the oldest stone structure west of the Allegheny Mountains.
- Danville National Cemetery is located within Bellevue Cemetery and contains Union soldiers who died during the Battle of Perryville. A lot containing the burial of Confederate soldiers is adjacent to the National Cemetery.
- Ephraim McDowell House Museum is the house where Ephraim McDowell performed his groundbreaking ovariotomy.
- Great American Dollhouse Museum is a 6,000-square-foot (560 m^{2}) social history museum in miniature.
- Jones Visual Arts Center is a gallery and primary studio for internationally known glass artist Stephen Rolfe Powell.
- Millennium Park is a 126-acre park containing walking trails, baseball fields, soccer fields, softball fields, basketball courts, playgrounds, a skateboard park, a dog park, and covered shelters.
- Perryville Battlefield is a park that preserves a significant battlefield of the Civil War.
- Warrenwood Manor is a historic property built in a Gothic Revival style.
- Wilderness Trail Distillery produces bourbon, rye, rum, and vodka from locally grown grains.

=== Theater ===
Five venues for theatrical productions live in Danville.

- The Norton Center for the Arts is a state-of-the-art host for performing and visual arts events throughout the year.
- Pioneer Playhouse is the oldest outdoor theater in Kentucky, and the first theater officially designated as Kentucky's state theater. It features summer-stock productions using local and nationally known artists.
- West T. Hill Community Theatre is a community theater with an acclaimed company of actors.
- Gravely Hall Performing Arts Center is located in Danville High School and is home to the performing arts in the Danville Schools system.
- Boyle County Performing Arts Center is located in Boyle County Middle School and is home to the performing arts in the Boyle County Schools system as well as being a host for performing and visual arts events throughout the year.

=== Annual events ===
- The Great American Brass Band Festival (June) is a free, three-day outdoor festival that features performances from brass bands from throughout the country. Other events have joined the festival like picnics, wine festivals, bourbon tastings, and the Great American Balloon Race.
- The Boyle County Fair (June) is a county fair.
- Kentucky's Governor's School for the Arts (July) at Centre College provides an educational springboard for young artists from around the state.
- The Kentucky State BBQ Festival (September) provides good music and good food from some of the country's best BBQ pitmasters.
- Harvest Fest (September) closes Main Street for a celebration.
- The Forkland Heritage Festival (October) celebrates the culture of an historic community.
- Perryville Battle Reenactment (October) is an authentic reliving of one of Kentucky's most significant Civil War battles.
- Bourbon Chase (October) is a 200-mile relay footrace through central Kentucky. Danville is a major exchange point.

=== Media and books ===
The Advocate-Messenger, a twice-weekly (Tuesday and Friday) newspaper, serves Danville and surrounding counties.

Local radio stations include three AM stations: WDFB-AM (1170), WHBN (1420), WHIR (1230), and three FM stations: WDFB-FM (88.1), WLAI(107.1), and WRNZ (105.1).

WDKY-TV was licensed to Danville but its facilities are located in Lexington.

Danville and Boyle County Black history is the subject of a 2022 book published by Arcadia Press, as "African Americans in Boyle County."

Martha S. Jones opens her book Vanguard: How Black Women Broke Barriers, Won the Vote, and Insisted on Equality for All with her family story of three generations who resided in Danville. Great-great-great-grandmother Nancy Belle Graves was born enslaved in 1808. Nancy's daughter, Susan Davis, organized the Danville Domestic Economy Club for black women which encouraged voter participation and education. Susan and her husband, Sam, were both born enslaved. Fighting in the Civil War for the Union, Sam became emancipated upon his 1864 enlistment in the 114th United States Colored Troops at nearby Camp Nelson. After the passage of the Fifteenth Amendment to the U.S. Constitution, Sam voted in the 1870 election. Their daughter, Frances Harriet Williams, organized for the NAACP, the YMCA, and served as a presidential advisor.

=== Sister cities ===
Danville has one sister city, as designated by Sister Cities International:

- Carrickfergus, County Antrim, Northern Ireland

Danville Sister Cities won the 2019 Innovation Award for Arts and Culture from Sister Cities International.

== Notable people ==
The following are highly noted people from Danville. For a more complete list, see List of people from Danville, Kentucky.

- James G. Birney Abolitionist
- John Boyle (1774–1834), U.S. federal judge and U.S. Representative; Boyle County, Kentucky, was named after him
- John C. Breckinridge (1821–1875), U.S. Representative and U.S. Senator from Kentucky, U.S. Vice President, U.S. presidential candidate, Confederate States Secretary of War
- Neal Brown, college football coach
- Jacqueline Coleman, educator and Lieutenant Governor of Kentucky
- Todd Duncan, opera singer and actor
- Speed S.Fry (1817–1892) lawyer, judge, officer United States Army during the American-Mexican War and Civil War
- Jordan Gay, National Football League player
- John Marshall Harlan (1833–1911), U.S. Supreme Court Justice; "The Great Dissenter"
- Larnelle Harris (1947–), Grammy and Dove Award-winning gospel singer and songwriter
- Robby Henson, screenwriter and director
- Ephraim McDowell (1771–1830), physician, first to successfully remove an ovarian tumor
- John Michael Montgomery (born 1965), country singer
- Theodore O'Hara (1820–1867), poet and soldier
- Hugh L. Scott (1853–1934), Superintendent of West Point, U.S. Army Chief of Staff in World War I
- Isaac Shelby (1750–1826), first and fifth Governor of Kentucky, soldier in Lord Dunmore's War, the American Revolutionary War, and War of 1812
- Jacob Tamme, National Football League player
- Frank X Walker (born 1961), Kentucky's first African-American Poet Laureate
- Fess Williams (1894–1975), jazz clarinetist and saxophonist
- Phil Woolpert (1915–1987), Head coach of the University of San Francisco Dons Men's Basketball in the 1950s. He led them to consecutive NCAA Division I Championships in 1955 and 1956

== In popular culture ==
Much of the movie Raintree County was filmed in Danville in 1957. The 1997 feature film Lawn Dogs was also filmed in Danville.

Danville is the hometown of Johnny Joestar, the protagonist from the manga JoJo's Bizarre Adventure: Steel Ball Run.

== See also ==
- Junction City, Kentucky, a nearby city originally known as Danville Junction and South Danville
