= Elmwood (Perryville, Kentucky) =

- U.S. Historic district – Contributing property
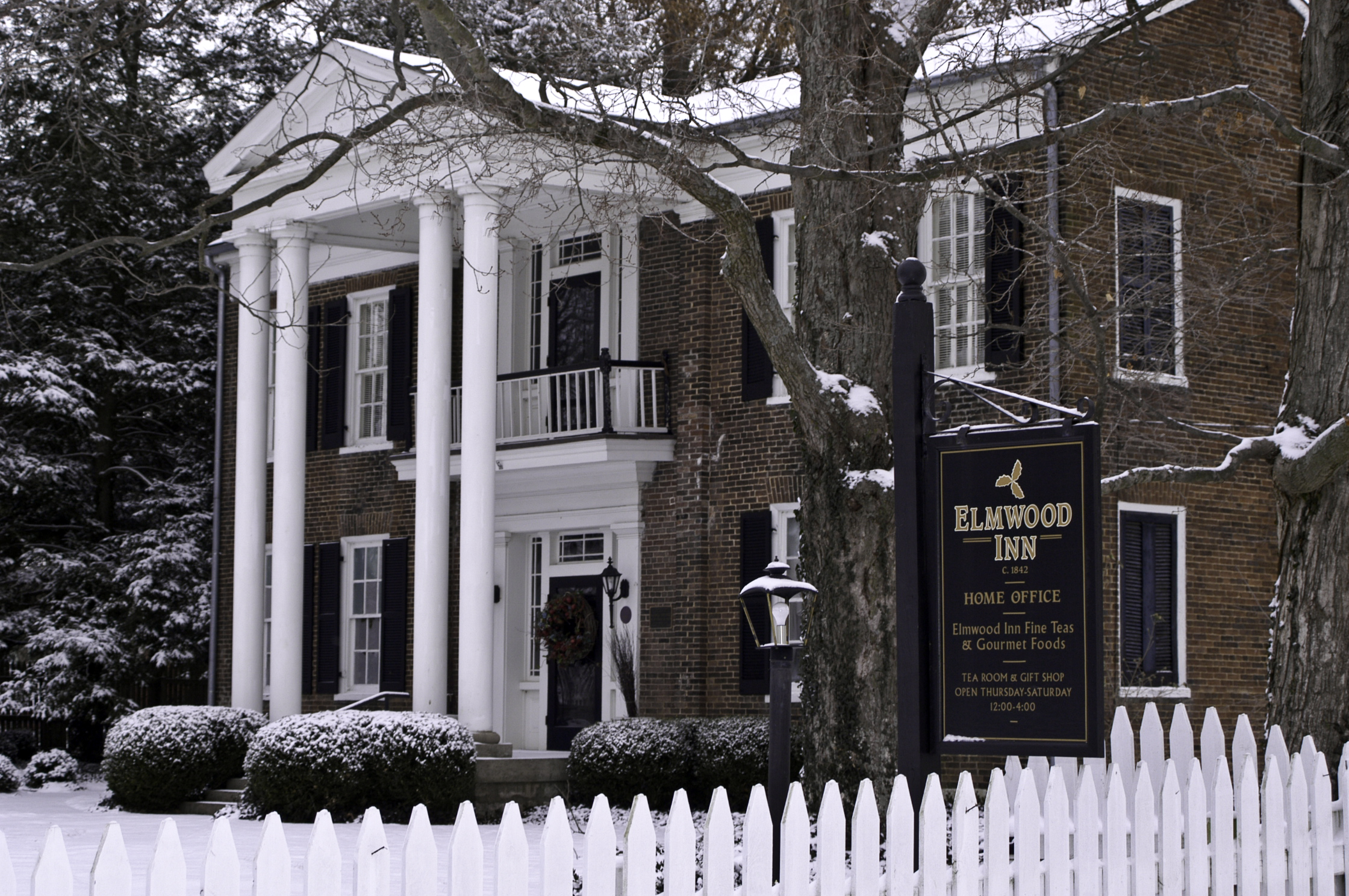
- The John Burton Mansion, later known as Elmwood Academy

- Location within Kentucky Location within the United States
- Location: E. 4th St. at the Chaplin River, Perryville, Kentucky
- Coordinates: 37.648458°N 84.950596°W
- Architectural style: Greek Revival
- Part of: Perryville Historic District (ID73000792)
- Designated CP: October 25, 1973

The Elmwood Inn in Perryville, Kentucky is a historic building which served as a mansion, a battlefield hospital in 1862, as an academy during 1891–1925, and later as a restaurant and as a tea house, and then again as a private residence.

Its facade illustrates tins of tea and recipe books distributed under the banner of the Elmwood Inn Fine Teas company.

Built in 1842 by local merchant John Burton, the Greek Revival mansion was used as a makeshift hospital during the 1862 Battle of Perryville in the American Civil War. The handsome building served as a boarding school, the Elmwood Academy, from 1896 until 1924 under the care of headmaster Thomas Poynter.

Elmwood was rescued by preservationists in 1974. It was placed on the National Register of Historic Places as a contributing building in the Perryville Historic District in 1973, and it was designated as a Kentucky landmark by Governor Wendell Ford. It served as a regional restaurant until 1989. Noted guests during that time included Ronald Reagan and KFC founder Colonel Harland Sanders. The inn was transformed into one of America's best-known tea houses in 1990 under the ownership of Bruce and Shelley Richardson. In 2002, Elmwood Inn was named by the UK Tea Council as the first American tea room to be included in their prestigious publication "Best Tea Places."

Elmwood closed to the public in 2004 and the grand house is now a private residence.

Elmwood Inn Fine Teas began importing, blending and packaging specialty teas in 1993 and now supplies teas to tea rooms, restaurants and gift shops in every state. Elmwood Inn's publishing division, Benjamin Press, is the publisher of over 17 books, mainly on the subject of tea.

The Elmwood Inn Fine Teas and Benjamin Press offices, blending and packaging operation is located at 135 North Second Street in Danville, Kentucky. A tea shop for retail and wholesale customers is located in that downtown facility.

The Elmwood Inn building was the Elmwood Academy from 1891 to 1925, built c.1850, served as a hospital in the Battle of Perryville.
