= Perryville Historic District =

Historic district in Kentucky, United States

- U.S. National Register of Historic Places
- U.S. Historic district
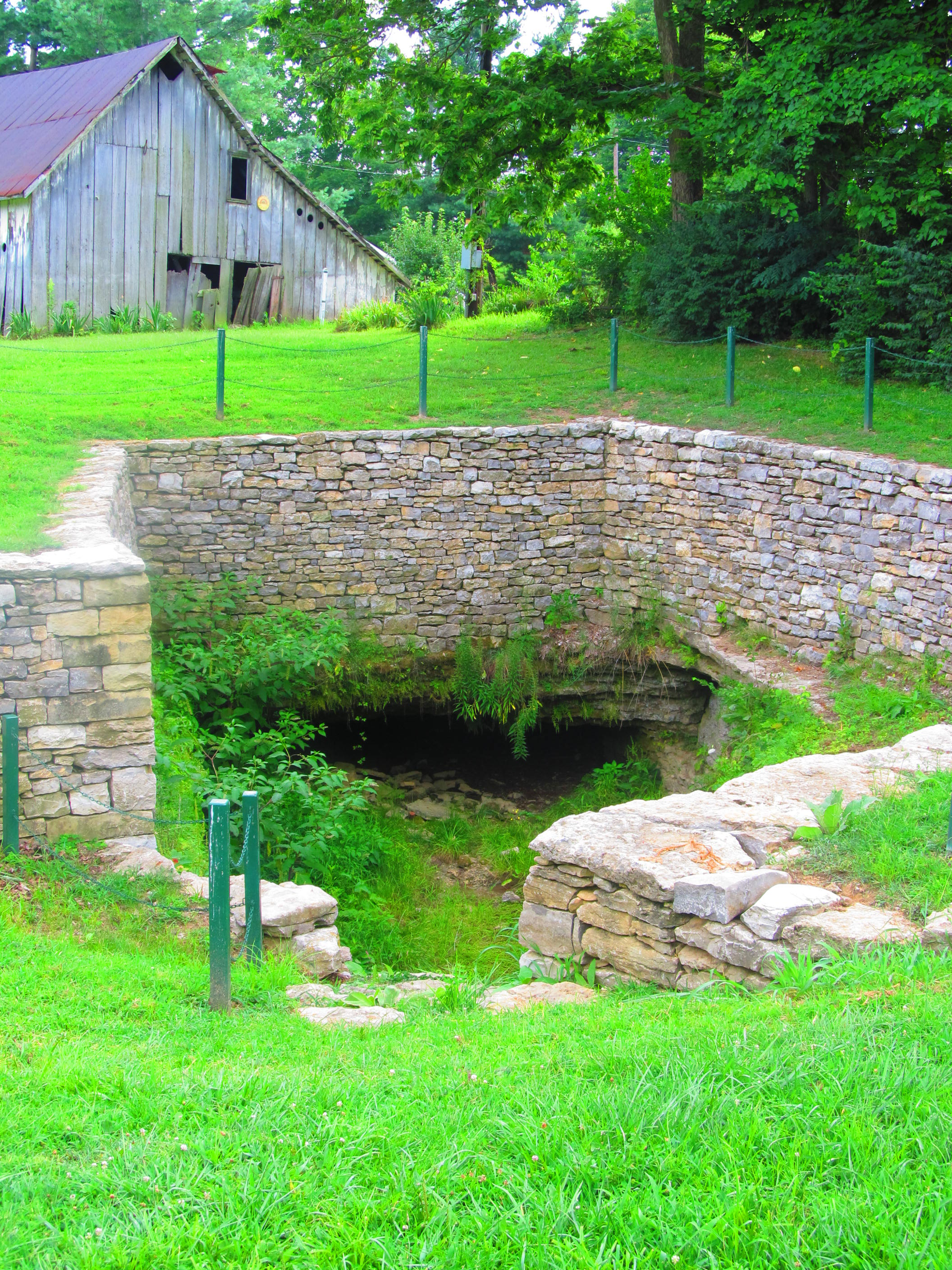
- Cave and spring within the district.

- Location within Kentucky Location within the United States
- Location: Roughly bounded by Sheridan Ave., Wood, Jefferson and 5th Sts., Perryville, Kentucky
- Coordinates: 37°38′58″N 84°57′04″W
- Area: 230 acres (0.93 km^{2})
- NRHP reference No.: 73000792
- Added to NRHP: October 25, 1973

Perryville Historic District is a 230-acre (0.93 km^{2}) historic district in Perryville, Kentucky which was listed on the National Register of Historic Places in 1973.

The district is roughly bounded by Sheridan Ave., Wood, Jefferson and 5th Streets. It included 55 contributing buildings, two contributing structures and four contributing sites.

It includes Elmwood Inn, which is the former Elmwood Academy from 1891 to 1923, built c.1850, served as a hospital in the Battle of Perryville. (Note: The Elmwood Academy is depicted in photos #1 and #12 accompanying NRHP nomination document.)
