= James Harbeson =

- Born: c. 1700 – c. 1760
- Died: c. 1783
- Cause of death: Beheading
- Known for: Founding Perryville

James Harbeson was an early American settler and founder of Harbeson's Station, now Perryville, Kentucky.

During the final stages of the American Revolution, Harbeson and a group of settlers crossed the blue mountains of Virginia into the Bluegrass region of Kentucky. Finding a suitable site alongside the Chaplin River, the settlers built a fort next to a spring and cave. Local legend holds that Harbeson disappeared after failing to reach the cave, which was used for defense against hostile Indians; his head, however, was discovered about a mile from the fort, likely severed in an attack. Dr. Jefferson J. Polk, physician to 19th century Perryville, relates in his autobiography that Harbeson's wife then "took the head and managed to keep it in a complete state of preservation for many years."
