= Perryville, Kentucky =

- City
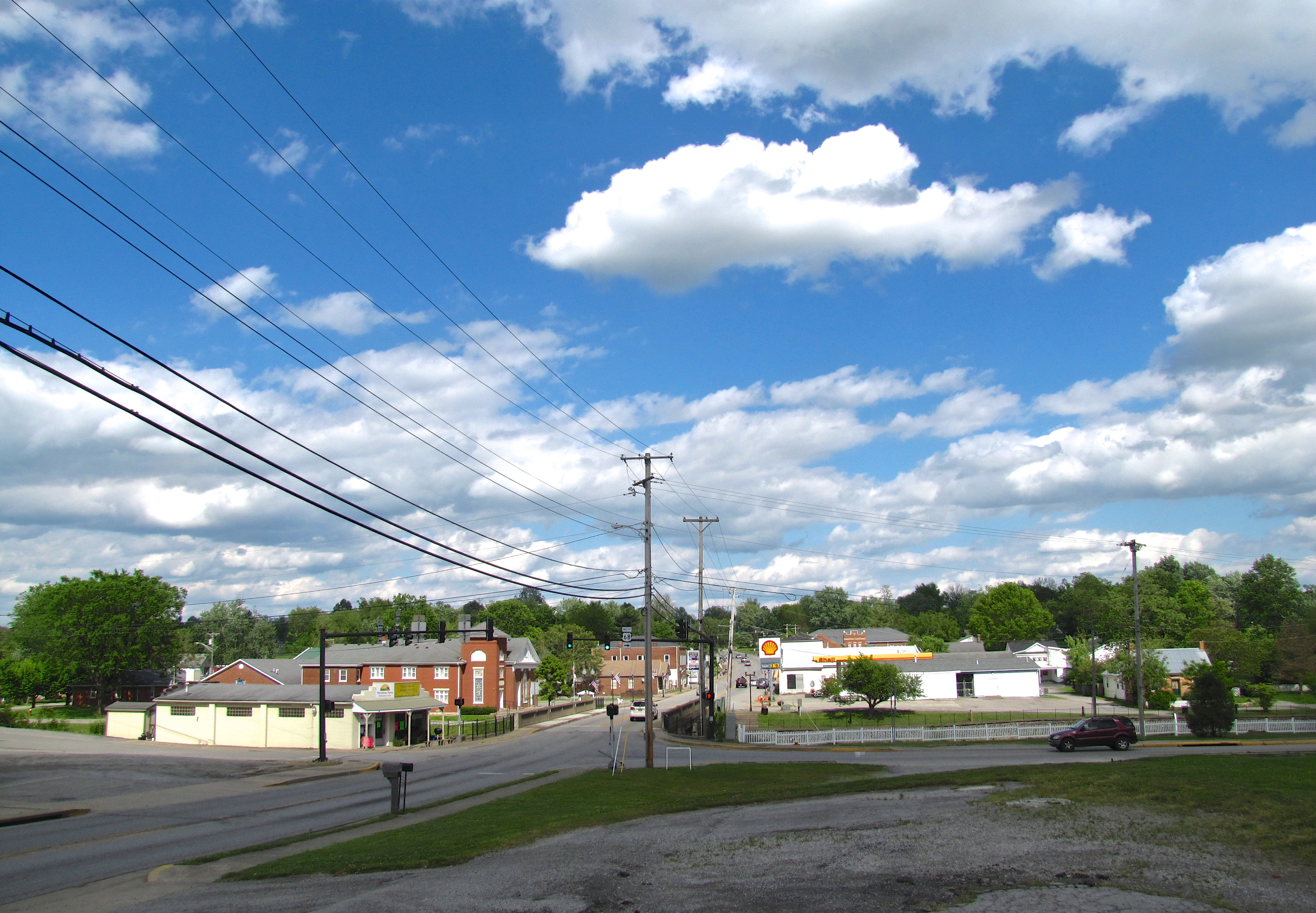
- View of Perryville along US-150 (2nd Street)

- Flag Seal

- Location of Perryville in Boyle County, Kentucky.
- Coordinates: 37°38′58″N 84°57′05″W
- Country: United States
- State: Kentucky
- County: Boyle
- Settled: January 17, 1817
- Incorporated: February 6, 1867
- Named for: Oliver Hazard Perry

Government
  - Mayor: Carlos Miller
  - City Council: Steve Bailey; Chasity Caldwell; Rob Kernodle; Mike Lankford; Jason Pruitt; Tim Simpson

Area
  - Total: 0.80 sq mi (2.06 km^{2})
  - Land: 0.78 sq mi (2.02 km^{2})
  - Water: 0.015 sq mi (0.04 km^{2})
- Elevation: 840 ft (260 m)

Population (2020)
  - Total: 782
  - Density: 1,001.3/sq mi (386.61/km^{2})
- Time zone: UTC-5 (Eastern (EST))
  - Summer (DST): UTC-4 (EDT)
- ZIP code: 40468
- Area code: 859
- FIPS code: 21-60258
- GNIS feature ID: 2404507
- Website: https://www.perryvilleky.gov/

Perryville (/ˈpɛrɪvəl, -vɪl/) is a home rule-class city along the Chaplin River in western Boyle County, Kentucky, in the United States. As of the 2020 census, Perryville had a population of 782. It is part of the Danville Micropolitan Statistical Area.

== History ==
The site was first settled by James Harbeson and a band of Virginians in the final stages of the American Revolution c. 1781. Harbeson's Fort or Station was located near a cave and spring to provide additional protection from Indian raids. The settlement's position beside the river and along roads leading to Harrod's Fort, Louisville, Lebanon, and Danville caused it to be renamed Harbeson's Crossing.

In 1815, Edward Bullock and William Hall laid out a new town at the site named for Cmdr. Oliver Hazard Perry, the hero of the 1813 Battle of Lake Erie during the War of 1812. Bullock started the post office the next year and the state legislature incorporated the city in 1817. In the late 1830s, a line of buildings next to the Chaplin River formed the basis of the village of Perryville. Now called "Merchants' Row", these buildings still stand.

The early nineteenth century revived interest in classical education for the small town. Many institutions of higher learning, mostly all-women's colleges, were established, including the Ewing Institute, the Elmwood Academy, and Harmonia College. One of Harmonia College's graduates achieved national prominence – Carrie Nation, the national temperance leader, boarded at the Karrick-Parks house while living in Perryville. As Nation "cleaned out" a number of local spots, it is believed that Perryville became the first location in the United States to exercise Local Option laws.

In October 1862, the fields west of town were the site of the Battle of Perryville, an important encounter in the American Civil War that ended the Kentucky Campaign of Confederate generals Braxton Bragg and Edmund Kirby Smith. The Perryville Battlefield is preserved as a state park, and is the site of a reenactment of the battle every year.

In 1961, Perryville and the surrounding area was made part of a National Historic Landmark area. In 1973, the entire town of Perryville, because of the contribution the village has made toward American history, was put on the National Register of Historic Places.

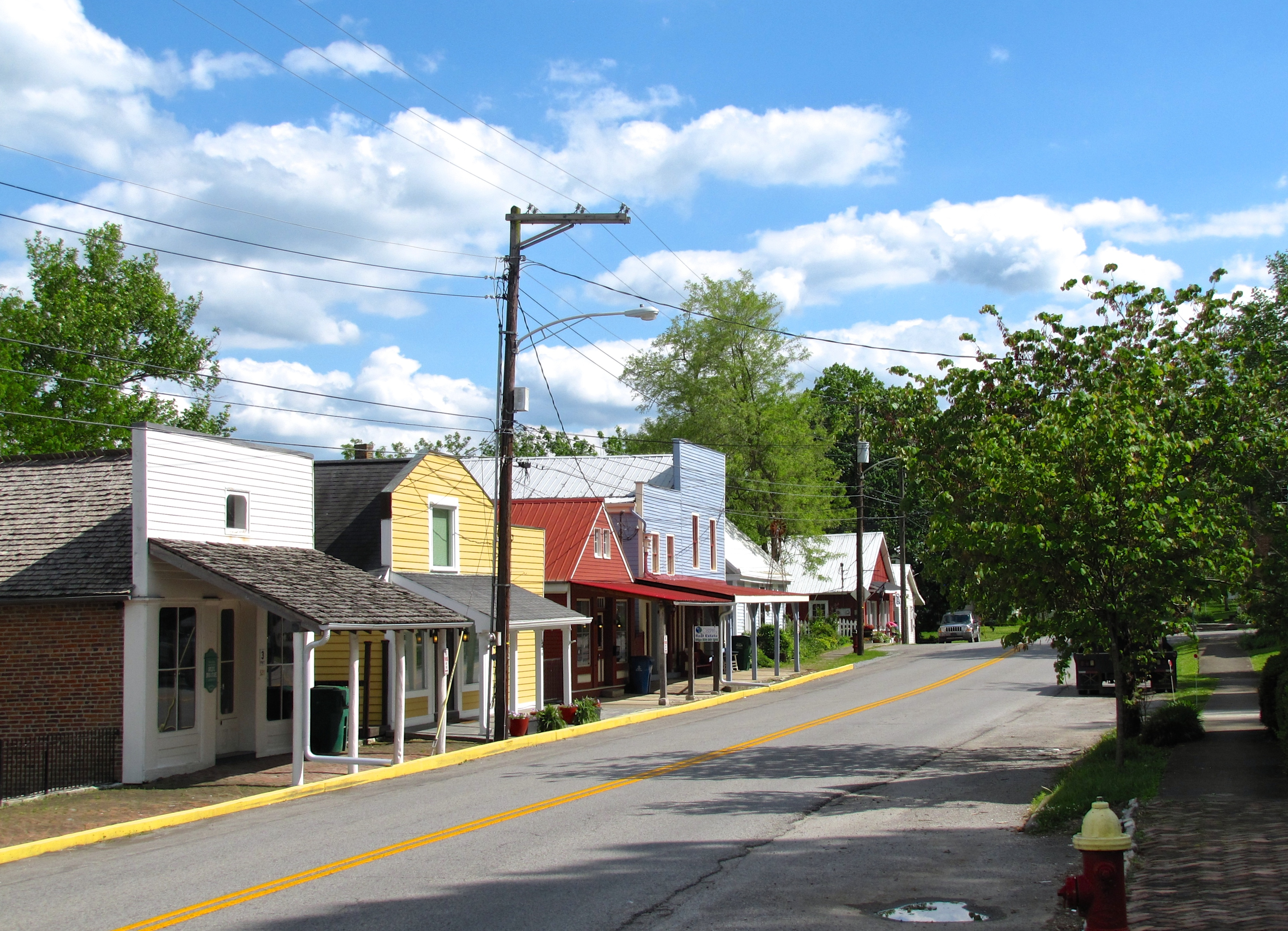
Merchants' Row, Perryville

== Geography ==
Perryville is located at the junction of US Route 68 and US Route 150.

According to the United States Census Bureau, the city has a total area of 0.81 square miles (2.1 km^{2}), of which 0.77 square miles (2.0 km^{2}) is land and 0.015 square miles (0.04 km^{2}), or 1.84%, is water.

== Demographics ==
Historical population
Census	Pop.	Note	%±
1830	283		—
1870	479		—
1880	498		4.0%
1890	436		−12.4%
1900	481		10.3%
1910	407		−15.4%
1920	631		55.0%
1930	349		−44.7%
1940	462		32.4%
1950	660		42.9%
1960	715		8.3%
1970	730		2.1%
1980	841		15.2%
1990	815		−3.1%
2000	763		−6.4%
2010	751		−1.6%
2020	782		4.1%
U.S. Decennial Census

As of the census of 2000, there were 763 people, 348 households, and 220 families residing in the city. The population density was 948.9 per square mile (366.4/km^{2}). There were 384 housing units at an average density of 477.5 per square mile (184.4/km^{2}). The racial makeup of the city was 93.18% White, 4.98% African American, 0.13% Native American, 0.13% Asian, and 1.57% from two or more races.

There were 348 households, out of which 27.6% had children under the age of 18 living with them, 44.8% were married couples living together, 15.5% had a female householder with no husband present, and 36.5% were non-families. 35.9% of all households were made up of individuals, and 21.3% had someone living alone who was 65 years of age or older. The average household size was 2.19 and the average family size was 2.81.

In the city, the population was spread out, with 24.1% under the age of 18, 5.8% from 18 to 24, 26.9% from 25 to 44, 22.0% from 45 to 64, and 21.2% who were 65 years of age or older. The median age was 39 years. For every 100 females, there were 79.5 males. For every 100 females age 18 and over, there were 74.4 males.

The median income for a household in the city was $28,594, and the median income for a family was $36,042. Males had a median income of $30,250 versus $25,938 for females. The per capita income for the city was $16,202. About 11.7% of families and 15.5% of the population were below the poverty line, including 19.3% of those under age 18 and 13.4% of those age 65 or over.

== Notable people ==
- E. Belle Jackson (1848–1942), first African-American educator at Camp Nelson, and co-founder of the Colored Orphans Industrial Home in Lexington, Kentucky
