= Chaplin River =

River in Kentucky, United States

Coordinates: 37.844229°N 85.278568°W

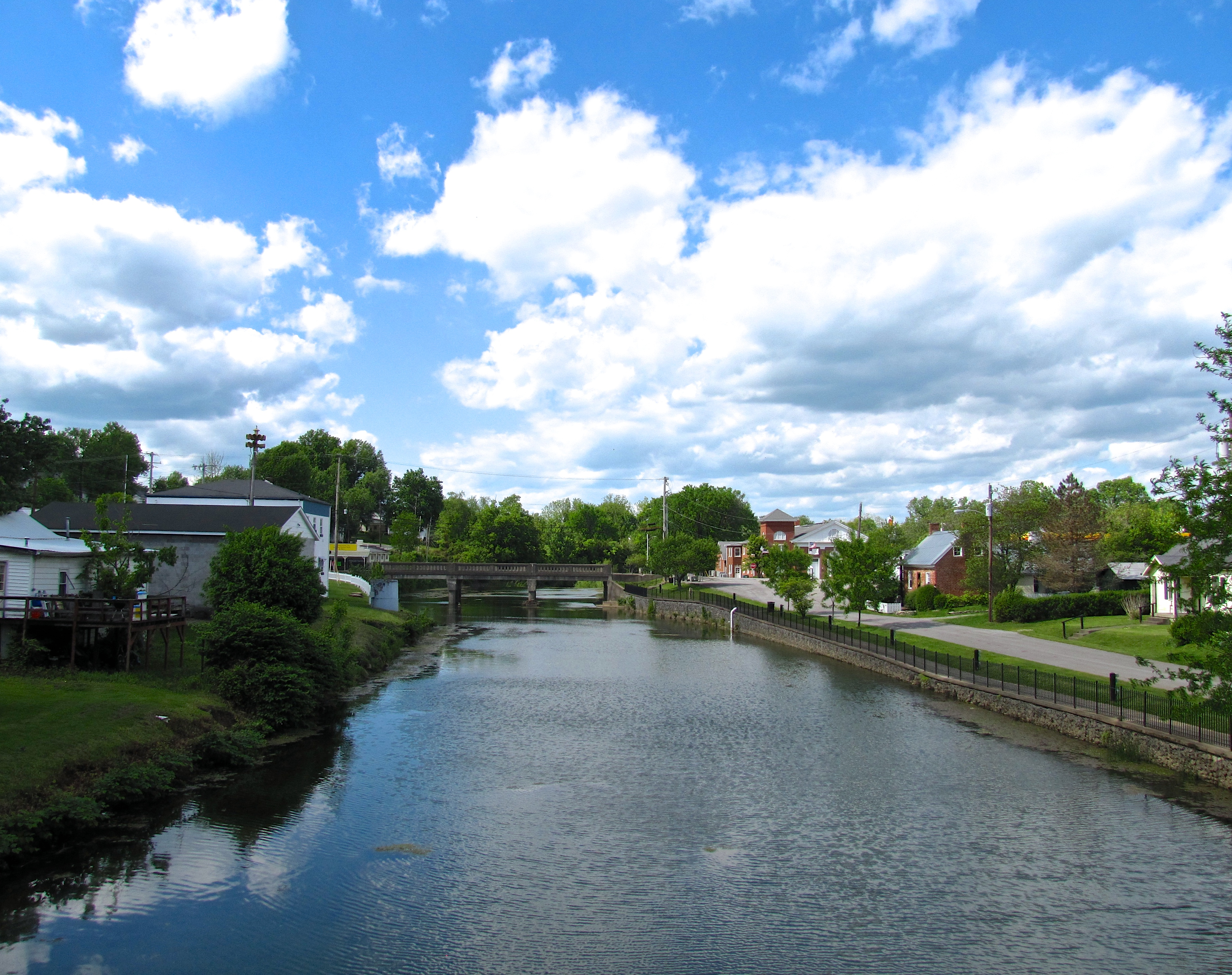
The Chaplin River in Perryville

The Chaplin River is an 85.6-mile-long (137.8 km) tributary of the Beech Fork of the Salt River in the U.S. state of Kentucky.

The name comes from Captain Abraham Chapline, an early explorer of the area.

The river's headwaters begin on the knob edges of the Pennyroyal Plateau near Parksville, Kentucky and the Parksville Knob, flow in parallel with the Salt River proper through the hilly Eden Shale belt and ending at the Beech Fork of the Salt River near the town of Chaplin. The river flows through the counties of Washington, Mercer, and Boyle.

The river flows through the middle of Perryville, the site of an 1862 American Civil War battle. The stream was a strategic natural resource used by both the Union and Confederate armies, though the river is but a large stream at this point in its journey.

== See also ==
- List of rivers of Kentucky
