= National Register of Historic Places listings in Boyle County, Kentucky =

Location of Boyle County in Kentucky

This is a list of the National Register of Historic Places listings in Boyle County, Kentucky.

This is intended to be a complete list of the properties and districts on the National Register of Historic Places in Boyle County, Kentucky, United States. The locations of National Register properties and districts for which the latitude and longitude coordinates are included below, may be seen in a map.

There are 100 properties and districts listed on the National Register in the county, including 3 that are National Historic Landmarks.

This National Park Service list is complete through NPS recent listings posted April 17, 2026.

== Current listings ==
	Name on the Register	Image	Date listed	Location	City or town	Description
1	Aliceton Camp Meeting Ground		April 9, 1998 (#98000329)	657 Ward's Branch Rd. 37°35′22″N 85°01′49″W	Gravel Switch	
2	John Barbee House		June 23, 1983 (#83002578)	Kentucky Route 34; 37°39′51″N 84°43′33″W	Bryantsville	
3	Thomas Barbee House		June 26, 2019 (#100004121)	204 E. Walnut St. 37°38′40″N 84°46′06″W	Danville	
4	H.P. Bottom House	H.P. Bottom House	January 1, 1976 (#76000851)	Northwest of Perryville on Old Mackville Rd. 37°39′52″N 84°58′14″W	Perryville	
5	Bower House		May 28, 1999 (#97001367)	Kentucky Route 34; 37°35′50″N 84°53′43″W	Parksville	
6	Boyle County Courthouse	Boyle County Courthouse	April 11, 1973 (#73000790)	Main and 4th Sts. 37°38′47″N 84°46′24″W	Danville	
7	Judge John Boyle House		November 25, 1980 (#80001485)	North of Danville on Bellows Mill Rd. 37°42′58″N 84°47′37″W	Danville	Demolished in 2017.
8	T. B. Bright House and Farmstead		November 19, 1997 (#97001356)	Kentucky Route 34, 1 mile (1.6 km) east of Danville; 37°39′52″N 84°43′38″W	Danville	
9	Nimrod I. Buster House and Farmstead		November 21, 1997 (#97001359)	0.2 miles (0.32 km) east of Buster Rd., 0.1 miles (0.16 km) south of Mercer County line 37°42′53″N 84°46′42″W	Danville	
10	Caldwell House		June 23, 1983 (#83002579)	Off U.S. Route 150; 37°38′07″N 84°51′13″W	Danville	
11	Charles W. Caldwell House		May 28, 1999 (#97001361)	0.2 miles (0.32 km) north of Kentucky Route 34, 0.6 miles (0.97 km) west of U.S Route 127; 37°37′47″N 84°48′38″W	Danville	
12	W. Logan Caldwell Farmstead		May 28, 1999 (#97001368)	Irvine Rd., 0.4 miles (0.64 km) north of Kentucky Route 34; 37°37′13″N 84°51′04″W	Danville	
13	Cambus-Kenneth Estate		November 17, 1977 (#77000602)	3 miles (4.8 km) northwest of Danville off U.S. Route 127; 37°40′13″N 84°47′59″W	Danville	
14	Carnegie Library	Carnegie Library	March 28, 1986 (#86000645)	Centre College campus 37°38′40″N 84°46′45″W	Danville	
15	Cincinnati Southern Railroad Culvert-CSRR		April 9, 1998 (#98000327)	Crossing of Norfolk Southern railroad line and Mocks Branch; 37°41′54″N 84°46′48″W	Danville	
16	Clemens-Caldwell House		April 3, 2026 (#100012876)	2011 Harrodsburg Road; 37°40′22″N 84°47′19″W	Danville	
17	Clifton Baptist Church Complex		February 12, 1998 (#98000085)	Clifton Rd., 1 mile (1.6 km) northeast of Kentucky Route 52; 37°38′49″N 84°41′30″W	Clifton	
18	Clifton Road Culvert		November 21, 1997 (#97001375)	Clifton Rd., 0.6 miles (0.97 km) north of Kentucky Route 52; 37°38′31″N 84°41′44″W	Clifton	
19	Confederate Monument in Danville	Confederate Monument in Danville	July 17, 1997 (#97000720)	Junction of Main and College Sts. 37°38′44″N 84°46′42″W	Danville	
20	Confederate Monument in Perryville	Confederate Monument in Perryville	July 17, 1997 (#97000722)	Perryville State Historic Site, 2.5 miles (4.0 km) northwest of Perryville; 37°40′29″N 84°58′17″W	Perryville	
21	Constitution Square Historic District	Constitution Square Historic District	April 2, 1976 (#76000847)	Bounded by Main and Walnut Sts., 1st and 2nd Sts. 37°38′42″N 84°46′14″W	Danville	
22	Crawford House	Crawford House	January 1, 1976 (#76000852)	Northeast of Perryville off U.S. Route 68; 37°39′45″N 84°56′24″W	Perryville	
23	William Crow House	William Crow House	June 23, 1983 (#83002581)	Off Kentucky Route 52; 37°38′21″N 84°44′46″W	Bryantsville	
24	Crow-Barbee House	Crow-Barbee House	June 23, 1983 (#83002580)	Stanford Rd. and Alta Ave. 37°38′30″N 84°45′39″W	Danville	
25	Henry Cutter Houses	Henry Cutter Houses	November 21, 1997 (#97001374)	678 and 690 Shelby St. 37°35′07″N 84°47′33″W	Junction City	
26	Danville Commercial District	Danville Commercial District	March 31, 1986 (#86000643)	W. Main between N. 5th and N. 1st, and area bounded by S. 3rd, W. Walnut, and S. 4th 37°38′43″N 84°46′19″W	Danville	
27	Danville National Cemetery	Danville National Cemetery	May 29, 1998 (#98000591)	277 N. 1st St. 37°39′13″N 84°46′15″W	Danville	
28	Dutch Barn		July 31, 1998 (#98000941)	Junction of Spears Ln. and Kentucky Route 33 east of Shakertown Rd. 37°40′44″N 84°45′15″W	Danville	
29	East Main Street Historic District	East Main Street Historic District	March 31, 1986 (#86000640)	419-619 E. Main St. 37°38′42″N 84°45′42″W	Danville	built between 1890 and 1930
30	First Christian Church	First Christian Church	April 9, 1998 (#98000331)	Junction of Shelby and Cemetery Sts. 37°35′05″N 84°47′29″W	Junction City	
31	First Presbyterian Church	First Presbyterian Church	March 31, 1986 (#86000638)	W. Main between N. 5th and N. 6th Sts. 37°38′44″N 84°46′38″W	Danville	
32	Forest Hill		October 16, 1989 (#89001712)	Kentucky Route 34, 3 miles (4.8 km) northeast of Danville; 37°40′09″N 84°43′47″W	Danville	
33	Forkland School and Gymnasium	Forkland School and Gymnasium	February 12, 1998 (#98000086)	Junction of Kentucky Route 37 and Curtis Rd. 37°33′06″N 84°59′06″W	Gravel Switch	
34	Gentry House		November 19, 1997 (#97001370)	Kentucky Route 150, 0.4 miles (0.64 km) south of its bypass 37°37′01″N 84°43′44″W	Danville	
35	Goodall Building	Goodall Building	January 8, 2014 (#13001047)	470 Stanford Rd. 37°38′28″N 84°45′50″W	Danville	
36	Granite Hill Farmstead	Granite Hill Farmstead	November 19, 1997 (#97001355)	2570 Lancaster Rd. 37°37′47″N 84°43′48″W	Danville	
37	Willis Grimes House		November 21, 1997 (#97001362)	8803 Kentucky Route 34; 37°37′14″N 84°49′36″W	Danville	
38	Guthrie-May House		May 28, 1999 (#98000336)	North of the junction of Kentucky Routes 37 and 243; 37°33′12″N 85°01′24″W	Gravel Switch	
39	Hankla-Walker House		July 31, 1998 (#98000931)	0.3 miles (0.48 km) northwest of Kentucky Route 1920, 0.6 miles (0.97 km) south of Whites Rd. 37°40′37″N 84°57′41″W	Perryville	
40	Harlan's Station Site		October 21, 1976 (#76000848)	5 miles (8.0 km) west of Danville on Salt River Rd. 37°40′21″N 84°52′21″W	Danville	
41	Elijah Harlan House		June 23, 1983 (#83002582)	U.S. Route 150; 37°40′07″N 84°52′09″W	Danville	
42	Harlan-Bruce House		November 14, 1978 (#78001304)	5 miles (8.0 km) east of Danville off Kentucky Route 52; 37°37′40″N 84°42′31″W	Danville	
43	Harrodsburg Pike Rural Historic District		December 21, 1998 (#98000942)	Western side of U.S. Route 127, 3.25 miles (5.23 km) south of the county line 37°40′49″N 84°48′31″W	Danville	
44	W.H. Haskins House	W.H. Haskins House	March 31, 1986 (#86000636)	420 Lexington Ave. 37°39′05″N 84°45′32″W	Danville	
45	A. Hutchings House		November 19, 1997 (#97001353)	Kentucky Route 52, 0.2 miles (0.32 km) west of its junction with Kentucky Route 590; 37°38′07″N 84°41′11″W	Danville	
46	Jacobs Hall, Kentucky School for the Deaf	Jacobs Hall, Kentucky School for the Deaf	October 15, 1966 (#66000354)	S. 3rd St. 37°38′29″N 84°46′18″W	Danville	
47	Junction City Municipal Building	Junction City Municipal Building	April 9, 1998 (#98000328)	Junction of Shelby and Lucas Sts. 37°35′14″N 84°47′49″W	Junction City	built in 1939
48	Abner Knox Farm		June 23, 1983 (#83002583)	U.S. Route 150; 37°38′59″N 84°51′51″W	Danville	
49	Lazy Acres Farm		May 28, 1999 (#97001372)	3910 Hustonville Rd. 37°35′22″N 84°46′27″W	Danville	
50	Lexington Avenue-Broadway Historic District	Lexington Avenue-Broadway Historic District	January 12, 1987 (#87000198)	W. and E. Lexington between N. 5th and Old Wilderness Rd. and area bounded by N. Larrimore, W. Broadway, and N. 5th 37°38′55″N 84°46′15″W	Danville	
51	Maple Avenue District	Maple Avenue District	June 16, 1987 (#87001241)	Both sides of Maple Ave. between W. Main and High; 37°38′59″N 84°46′57″W	Danville	
52	Marshall House		June 23, 1983 (#83002584)	Off Kentucky Route 34; 37°37′14″N 84°48′29″W	Junction City	
53	Marshall-Wallace House		March 16, 2021 (#100006268)	350 Harberson Ln. 37°36′04″N 84°53′58″W	Danville	
54	Peter Mason House		November 27, 1991 (#91001711)	Off U.S. Route 127, 3 miles (4.8 km) north of Danville; 37°41′55″N 84°48′42″W	Danville	
55	McClure-Barbee House	McClure-Barbee House	March 7, 1973 (#73000791)	304 S. 4th St. 37°38′36″N 84°46′26″W	Danville	
56	Dr. Ephraim McDowell House	Dr. Ephraim McDowell House	October 15, 1966 (#66000355)	125-127 S. 2nd St. 37°38′43″N 84°46′15″W	Danville	
57	McFerran House		November 21, 1997 (#97001360)	U.S. Route 127, 0.2 miles (0.32 km) south of Kentucky Route 150; 37°36′54″N 84°46′37″W	Danville	Demolished 2001.
58	McGrorty Avenue-Old Wilderness Road Historic District		March 7, 2019 (#100003476)	Wilderness Rd. between E. Broadway and Fitzpatrick St. 37°38′51″N 84°45′56″W	Danville	
59	Melrose		April 3, 1986 (#86000631)	U.S. Route 127; 37°41′19″N 84°47′43″W	Danville	
60	James P. Mitchell House and Farmstead		November 19, 1997 (#97001349)	Kentucky Route 34, 0.4 miles (0.64 km) from its junction with Kentucky Route 1856; 37°36′04″N 84°56′42″W	Mitchellsburg	
61	Mitchellsburg Louisville and Nashville Railroad Culvert		April 9, 1998 (#98000332)	L&N railroad grade over Buck Creek; 37°36′05″N 84°57′10″W	Mitchellsburg	
62	Randolf Mock Farm		June 23, 1983 (#83002585)	Off Kentucky Route 33; 37°41′44″N 84°45′06″W	Danville	
63	Christopher Collins Moore Farm		December 29, 1994 (#94001506)	3901 Harrodsburg Rd. 37°41′29″N 84°48′08″W	Danville	
64	J.J. Moore House		November 21, 1997 (#97001369)	Junction of Kentucky Routes 34 and 1822; 37°36′20″N 84°52′54″W	Parksville	
65	The Norton Center for the Arts	The Norton Center for the Arts	October 26, 2023 (#100009524)	600 West Walnut Street (Centre College campus); 37°38′43″N 84°46′45″W	Danville	
66	Old Centre, Centre College	Old Centre, Centre College	August 25, 1972 (#72000529)	W. Walnut St., Centre College campus 37°38′44″N 84°46′54″W	Danville	
67	Mary Simpson Oldham House		November 19, 1997 (#97001364)	2907 Perryville Rd. 37°39′20″N 84°49′12″W	Danville	
68	Penn's Store	Penn's Store	February 12, 1998 (#98000094)	0.1 miles (0.16 km) west of Kentucky Route 243, on Boyle-Casey County line 37°32′59″N 85°01′41″W	Gravel Switch	
69	Perryville Battlefield	Perryville Battlefield	October 15, 1966 (#66000356)	West of Perryville on U.S. Route 150; 37°40′35″N 84°58′04″W	Perryville	
70	Perryville Historic District	Perryville Historic District	October 25, 1973 (#73000792)	Roughly bounded by Sheridan Ave., Wood, Jefferson, and 5th Sts. 37°38′58″N 84°57′04″W	Perryville	Includes the Elmwood Inn.
71	Pleasant Vale		November 15, 1984 (#84000357)	Lexington Rd. 37°40′19″N 84°45′05″W	Danville	
72	Purdom-Lewis-Hutchison House		November 19, 1997 (#97001351)	Curtis Rd. at the Rolling Fork River; 37°32′37″N 84°58′57″W	Gravel Switch	
73	Rice-Worthington House		March 30, 1995 (#95000301)	0.3 miles (0.48 km) south of Faulconer Rd., on S. Buster Pike; 37°42′08″N 84°46′49″W	Danville	
74	James Robinson House		April 9, 1998 (#98000333)	Kentucky Route 1856, 1.5 miles (2.4 km) north of Kentucky Route 34; 37°37′04″N 84°57′16″W	Mitchellsburg	
75	Rosel Hotel	Rosel Hotel	November 21, 1997 (#97001371)	Junction of Shelby St. and White Oak Rd. 37°35′15″N 84°47′51″W	Junction City	
76	Roselawn		March 13, 1986 (#86000369)	U.S. Route 127; 37°40′54″N 84°47′18″W	Danville	
77	St. James A.M.E. Church	St. James A.M.E. Church	January 23, 2013 (#12001198)	124 E. Walnut St. 37°38′39″N 84°46′08″W	Danville	
78	St. Mildred's Court-West Lexington Avenue Historic District	St. Mildred's Court-West Lexington Avenue Historic District	January 28, 1994 (#93001582)	125-162 St. Mildred's Ct. and 797-852 W. Lexington Ave. 37°38′51″N 84°46′49″W	Danville	
79	Salt River Road		November 19, 1997 (#97001350)	Along Salt River Rd. 37°39′38″N 84°51′49″W	Danville	
80	Second Street Christian Church	Second Street Christian Church	January 23, 2013 (#12001197)	228 S. 2nd St. 37°38′38″N 84°46′15″W	Danville	
81	Spears-Craig House		November 21, 1997 (#97001358)	0.1 miles (0.16 km) west of Kentucky Route 33, 0.6 miles (0.97 km) south of Spears Ln. 37°40′22″N 84°45′59″W	Danville	
82	Spring Hill (Thomas Lillard House)		January 27, 1983 (#83002586)	South of Danville on U.S. Route 150; 37°36′47″N 84°43′14″W	Danville	
83	Stone Bridge at Chaplin Creek		April 9, 1998 (#98000335)	Junction of Cash Rd. and Old Mitchellsburg Rd. 37°35′51″N 84°54′38″W	Parksville	
84	Stone House on Old Stage Road		June 23, 1983 (#83002587)	Kentucky Route 34; 37°40′07″N 84°43′19″W	Bryantsville	
85	Tank Pond Railroad Underpass		April 9, 1998 (#98000334)	Junction of Tank Pond Rd. and Kentucky Route 34; 37°35′44″N 84°54′39″W	Mitchellsburg	
86	Terrace Court Historic District	Terrace Court Historic District	August 31, 2010 (#09001305)	North and south sides of Terrace Ct., west of Old Wilderness Rd. 37°38′46″N 84°46′01″W	Danville	
87	William Thompson House		June 23, 1983 (#83002588)	Off U.S. Route 68; 37°40′55″N 84°55′02″W	Perryville	
88	Three Gothic Villas	Three Gothic Villas	July 20, 1977 (#77000603)	Northwest of Danville off U.S. Route 127, 525 Maple Ave., and south of Danville off Kentucky Route 35; 37°39′16″N 84°47′03″W	Danville	
89	Todd-Montgomery Houses	Todd-Montgomery Houses	March 26, 1976 (#76000849)	229, 243, 251, and 305 N. 3rd St. 37°38′55″N 84°46′21″W	Danville	
90	Trinity Episcopal Church	Trinity Episcopal Church	September 15, 1977 (#77000604)	320 W. Main St. 37°38′43″N 84°46′24″W	Danville	
91	Union Monument in Perryville	Union Monument in Perryville	July 17, 1997 (#97000723)	Perryville Battlefield State Historic Site, 2.5 miles (4.0 km) northwest of Perryville; 37°40′30″N 84°58′17″W	Perryville	
92	Unknown Confederate Dead Monument in Perryville	Unknown Confederate Dead Monument in Perryville	July 17, 1997 (#97000721)	Address Restricted	Perryville	
93	J.S. and Nannie Vanarsdale House		November 19, 1997 (#97001376)	Kentucky Route 52 in Atoka; 37°38′54″N 84°51′40″W	Danville	
94	Vermillion House and Farmstead		August 14, 1998 (#97001373)	378 Salt River Rd. 37°41′26″N 84°52′50″W	Danville	
95	J.S. Wallace House		November 19, 1997 (#97001357)	Kentucky Route 34, 0.4 miles (0.64 km) south of the Mercer County line 37°42′31″N 84°45′46″W	Danville	
96	Warehouse District	Warehouse District	March 31, 1986 (#86000634)	Intersection of Harding and W. Walnut Sts. 37°38′42″N 84°47′03″W	Danville	
97	Waveland	Waveland	May 6, 1976 (#76000850)	0.5 miles (0.80 km) south of Danville; 37°37′28″N 84°46′06″W	Danville	
98	Wilson's Station	Wilson's Station	November 21, 1997 (#97001363)	3750 Lebanon Rd. 37°37′15″N 84°48′49″W	Danville	
99	Charles T. Worthington House		November 21, 1997 (#97001365)	0.3 miles (0.48 km) west of Bluegrass Rd., 0.6 miles (0.97 km) north of Gentry Ln. 37°41′01″N 84°50′06″W	Danville	
100	Samuel Yeager House		November 19, 1997 (#97001352)	Kentucky Route 590, 0.7 miles (1.1 km) south of its junction with Kentucky Route 52; 37°37′31″N 84°41′08″W	Danville	

== See also ==
- List of National Historic Landmarks in Kentucky
- National Register of Historic Places listings in Kentucky
