= Waveland =

Waveland may refer to:

in the Atlantic Ocean

- The islet of Rockall, designated as an independent state by Greenpeace

in the United States

- Waveland, Florida
- Waveland Avenue, a bordering street of Wrigley Field (left-field side), in Chicago, Illinois
- Waveland, Indiana
- Waveland State Historic Site, listed on the National Register of Historic Places in Fayette County, Kentucky
- Waveland (Danville, Kentucky), listed on the National Register of Historic Places in Boyle County, Kentucky
- Waveland, Mississippi, a town devastated by Hurricane Katrina in 2005
- Waveland (Marshall, Virginia), listed on the National Register of Historic Places in Fauquier County, Virginia
