= Kentucky Route 2168 =

State highway in Kentucky, United States

Kentucky Route 2168
- KY 2168 highlighted in red

Route information
- Maintained by KYTC
- Length: 3.088 mi (4.970 km)
- Existed: May 1993–present

Major junctions
- West end: US 127 near Danville
- East end: KY 34 in Danville

Location
- Country: United States
- State: Kentucky
- Counties: Boyle

Highway system
- Kentucky State Highway System; Interstate; US; State; Parkways
← KY 2167	→ KY 2169

Kentucky Route 2168 (KY 2168) is a 3.1-mile (5.0 km) state highway in Boyle County, Kentucky. It is mainly used as a connector between U.S. Route 127 (US 127), KY 33, and KY 34. The first roundabout in Boyle County was built at the junction of KY 2168 with KY 33. The route features a multi-use path between KY 33 and KY 34 with future plans to expand the path all the way to US 127.

== Major intersections ==
The entire route is in Boyle County.

Location	mi	km	Destinations	Notes
	0.000	0.000	US 127 – Danville, Harrodsburg	
Danville	1.463	2.354	KY 33 – Burgin	Roundabout
Danville	3.088	4.970	KY 34	
1.000 mi = 1.609 km; 1.000 km = 0.621 mi
