= Aliceton Camp Meeting Ground =

- U.S. National Register of Historic Places
- Location within Kentucky Location within the United States
- Nearest city: Gravel Switch, Kentucky
- Coordinates: 37°35′22″N 85°01′49″W
- Area: 10 acres (4.0 ha)
- MPS: Boyle MPS
- NRHP reference No.: 98000329
- Added to NRHP: April 9, 1998

The Aliceton Camp Meeting Ground, at 657 Ward's Branch Rd. in Boyle County, Kentucky near Gravel Switch, Kentucky, was listed on the National Register of Historic Places in 1998.

It is significant as "a camp meeting ground - a place where area residents could come and join together for a week during the summer for social interaction and religious fellowship. The period of significance extends from ca. 1900, the year that the meeting ground was established, to 1945, the end of the period of significance. The Aliceton Camp Meeting Ground was established in 1900, when this ten acre parcel of land was given as a permanent place for area residents to attend non-denominational camp meetings in the summer. A copy of the original document dated June 30, 1900 reads in part: "The people of Boyle County and adjacent counties around Aliceton, for the purpose of establishing a Holiness camp ground" give this land. "The object of the Camp Meeting ground is the propagation of what is known as Bible and Wesleyan doctrine of holiness of scripture and entire sanctification." The document established that the camp meeting would be held annually on the grounds..."

The mention of Wesleyan doctrine is suggestive of Methodism.

The listing included seven contributing buildings and one contributing structure on 10 acres (4.0 ha).

It includes:

- Tabernacle (1942)
- Board and Batten cottage (c.1900), one of two original cabins
- "Evangelist's Cottage" (c.1900), a one-room cottage
