= Northpoint Training Center =

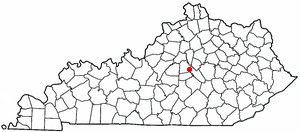

Location
- 710 Walter Reed Rd; Burgin, KY address 40422; United States
- Coordinates: 37°42′34″N 84°44′46″W

Information
- Type: Medium security prison
- Opened: 1983
- Authority: Kentucky Department of Corrections
- Warden: Abigail Caudill
- Staff: 285
- Enrollment: 1256 (2006)
- Campus size: 551 acres (223 ha)
- Accreditation: American Correctional Association
- Budget: $14,000,000
- Website: https://corrections.ky.gov/Facilities/AI/ntc/Pages/default.aspx

Northpoint Training Center is a medium-security prison located in unincorporated Boyle County, Kentucky, with a Burgin postal address, and near Danville. It opened in 1983 and had a prison capacity of 1,256 as of 2006.

== History ==
Northpoint was originally constructed as a state mental hospital called Kentucky State Hospital.

From 1941 to 1946, the U.S. Army controlled the facilities and renamed it Darnell Hospital. It was used to provide care for soldiers suffering from psychiatric illness and to contain German prisoners of war (POWs).

In 1946, the hospital was returned to state control for the sum of $1. The facilities were again operated as the Kentucky State Hospital until 1977.

From July 1977 through February 1983, the Kentucky Bureau of Social Services operated the facilities as the Danville Youth Development Center, a youth center for juvenile offenders.

In January 1983, the Kentucky Department of Corrections received control of the property and renamed it Northpoint Training Center. It was intended as a minimum-security institution for fewer than 500 inmates, but quickly changed to a medium-security institution with a proposed population of approximately 700 inmates.

== Status ==
Northpoint consists of 551 acres (223 ha) and approximately 50 structures. It has a bed capacity of 1,256 inmates, consisting of 1,108 general population medium-security beds, 60 special management beds, and 40 minimum-security beds. General population inmates are housed in six open-bay dormitories. Restricted Housing Unit inmates are housed in single cells in a 60-bed structure separated from the main compound.

The perimeter of the secure compound is a double fence 12 feet (3.7 m) high, with razor wire on the bottom and top. The inner perimeter fence has a sensor system that alerts the main control in the event of contact, four armed-wall-towers, an outside patrol, and a control center. Minimum-Security inmates are housed in two structures outside the secure perimeter.

== 2009 riot ==
On the evening of August 21, 2009, 60 to 80 inmates were involved in a riot at the facility. Five buildings were set on fire, including the kitchen, medical, visiting, canteen, and a multi-purpose building. By 10:30pm that night, the prison's Corrections Emergency Response Team had subdued the Inmates. Some inmates sustained minor injuries. Damage to the facility was so extensive that some of the 1,200 inmates at the prison were transported to other prisons. The prison had been on lockdown since August 18, when a black inmate and a white inmate were assaulted by 10-15 Hispanic inmates.
