= Kentucky Route 300 =

State highway in Kentucky, United States

Kentucky Route 300
- KY 300 highlighted in red

Route information
- Maintained by KYTC
- Length: 16.6 mi (26.7 km)

Major junctions
- West end: KY 34 / KY 1822 in Parksville
- KY 37 in Junction City; US 127 in Junction City; KY 78 in Stanford
- East end: US 150 in Stanford

Location
- Country: United States
- State: Kentucky
- Counties: Boyle, Lincoln

Highway system
- Kentucky State Highway System; Interstate; US; State; Parkways
← KY 299	→ KY 301

Kentucky Route 300 (KY 300) is a 16.6-mile-long (26.7 km) state highway in the U.S. state of Kentucky. The highway connects mostly rural areas of Boyle and Lincoln counties with Parksville, Junction City, and Stanford.

== Route description ==
=== Boyle County ===
KY 300 begins at an intersection with KY 34/KY 1822 (Lebanon Road) in Parksville, within Boyle County; however, only KY 34 is signed at this intersection. It travels to the east-southeast and leaves Parksville. It travels just north of Wilsonville. It curves to the east-northeast and enters Alum Springs, where it intersects the northern terminus of KY 3365 (Hogue Hollow Road). The highway curves to the southeast and begins a concurrency with KY 37 (Stewarts Lane). Almost immediately, they enter Junction City. They split, and KY 300 crosses over some railroad tracks of Norfolk Southern Railway. KY 300 then intersects U.S. Route 127 (US 127). It intersects the western terminus of KY 1273 (Hustonville Road). It turns right onto Hustonville Road, and travels to the south-southwest. At the intersection with the eastern terminus of York Lane and the western terminus of Short Acres Road, the highway leaves the city limits of Junction City. The highway then enters Lincoln County.

=== Lincoln County ===
KY 300 turns left onto Knob Lick Road and resumes its trek to the southeast and crosses over Knoblick Creek. It begins a curve to the south-southwest and crosses over the creek again. Then, the highway curves back to the southeast and crosses over Hanging Fork Creek. On the southeastern edge of Stanford, it intersects KY 78 (Hustonville Road). The two highways travel concurrently to the east and travel through Buffalo Springs Cemetery. They curve to the southeast and then back to the northeast. When they cross over St. Asaph Creek, they enter Stanford proper. They curve to the east-northeast and intersect the eastern terminus of KY 2319 (Helm Street). Almost immediately, they split. KY 300 travels to the north-northwest and meets its eastern terminus, an intersection with US 150 (Wilderness Road).

== Major intersections ==
County	Location	mi	km	Destinations	Notes
Boyle	Parksville	0.0	0.0	KY 34 / KY 1822 (Lebanon Road)	Western terminus
Boyle	Alum Springs	3.2	5.1	KY 3365 south (Hogue Hollow Road)	Northern terminus of KY 3365
Boyle		5.1	8.2	KY 37 east (Stewarts Lane)	Western end of KY 37 concurrency
Boyle	Junction City	5.7	9.2	KY 37 west (White Oak Road)	Eastern end of KY 37 concurrency
Boyle	Junction City	6.4	10.3	US 127 – Liberty, Danville	
Boyle	Junction City	6.7	10.8	KY 1273 east (Hustonville Road)	Western terminus of KY 1273
Lincoln	Stanford	14.5	23.3	KY 78 west (Hustonville Road)	Western end of KY 78 concurrency
Lincoln	Stanford	15.3	24.6	KY 2319 west (Helm Street)	Eastern terminus of KY 2319
Lincoln	Stanford	15.3	24.6	KY 78 east (West Main Street)	Eastern end of KY 78 concurrency
Lincoln	Stanford	16.6	26.7	US 150 (Wilderness Road) – Somerset, Danville	Eastern terminus
1.000 mi = 1.609 km; 1.000 km = 0.621 mi: Concurrency terminus
