= Statue of Ephraim McDowell =

Sculpture by Charles Henry Niehaus

Ephraim McDowell
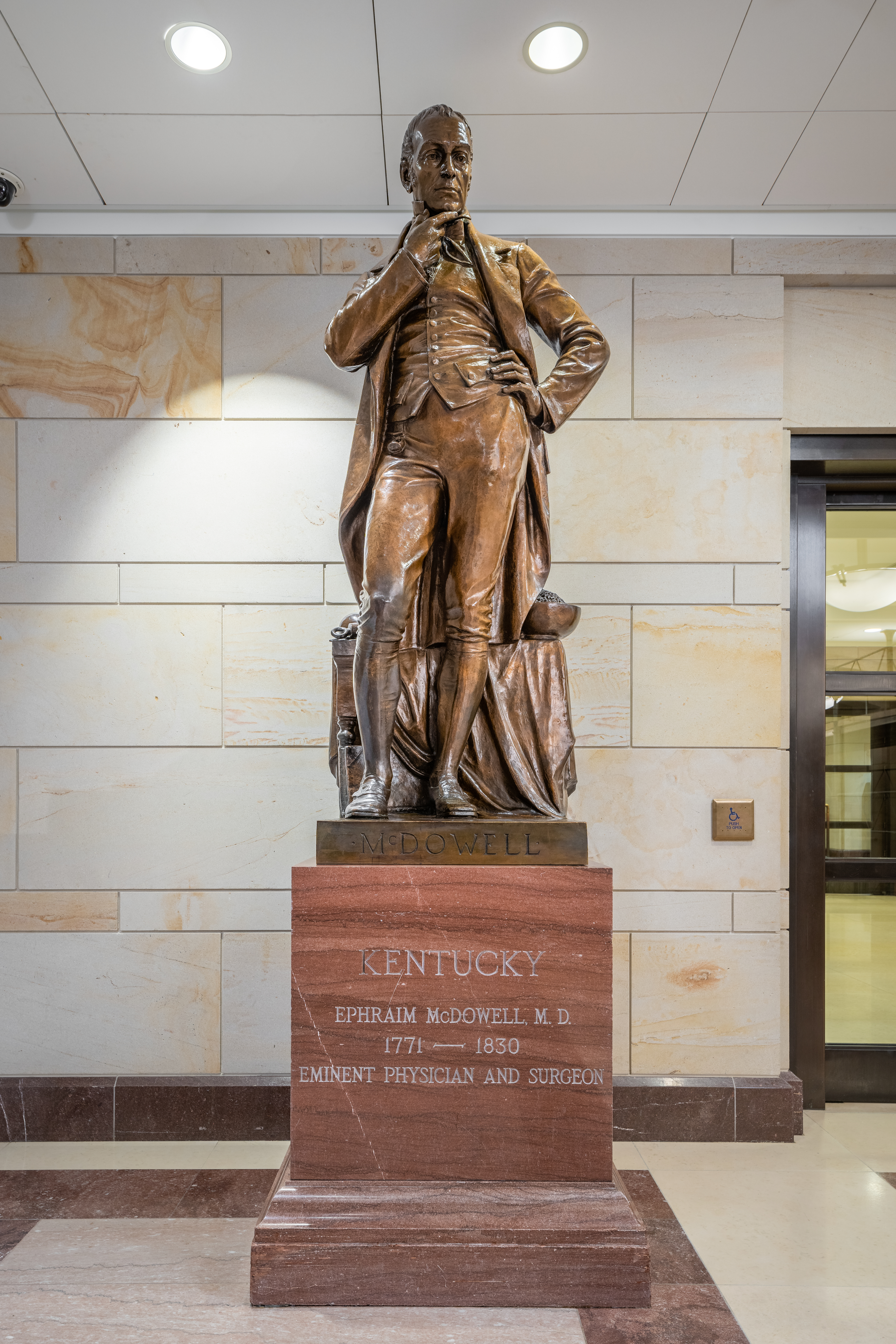
- The statue at the United States Capitol Visitor Center in 2023
- Artist: Charles Henry Niehaus
- Medium: Bronze sculpture
- Subject: Ephraim McDowell
- Location: Frankfort, Kentucky; Washington, D.C.

Ephraim McDowell is a bronze sculpture of the American physician and surgeon of the same name by Charles Henry Niehaus, installed in the United States Capitol Visitor Center, in Washington, D.C., as part of the National Statuary Hall Collection. The statue was gifted by the U.S. state of Kentucky in 1929.

Another copy is installed at the Kentucky State Capitol.

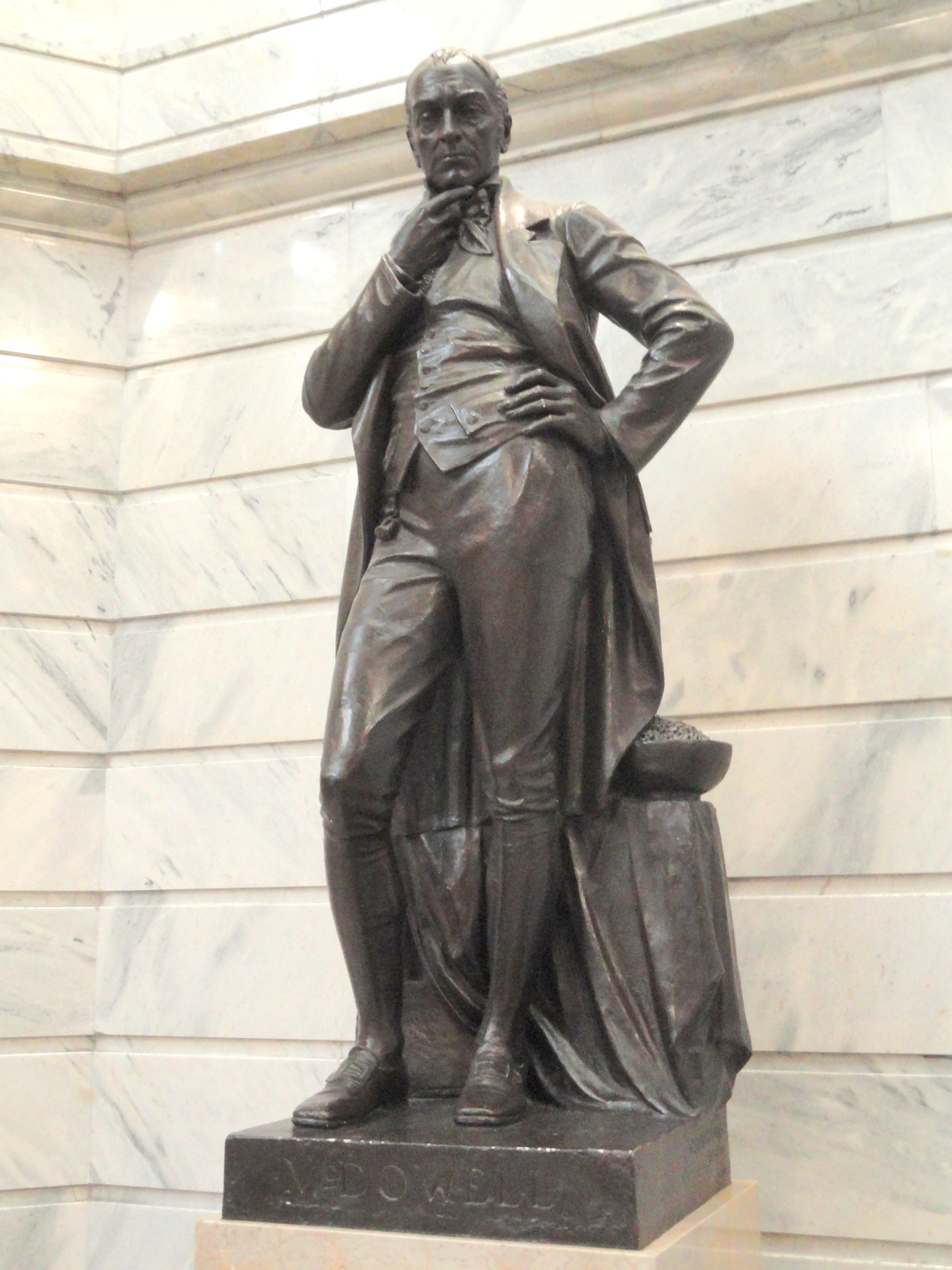
The statue in the Kentucky State Capitol

== See also ==
- 1929 in art
