= Kentucky Route 34 =

State highway in Kentucky, United States

Kentucky Route 34
- KY 34 highlighted in red

Route information
- Maintained by KYTC
- Length: 21.828 mi (35.129 km)

Major junctions
- West end: US 68 / KY 52 near Mitchellsburg
- KY 300 in Parksville; US 127 Byp. / US 150 Byp. west of Danville; US 150 / KY 52 in Danville; US 127 in Danville; US 27 east of Danville
- East end: Lexington Road east of Danville

Location
- Country: United States
- State: Kentucky
- Counties: Boyle, Garrard

Highway system
- Kentucky State Highway System; Interstate; US; State; Parkways
← KY 33	→ KY 35

Kentucky Route 34 (KY 34) is a 21.828-mile-long (35.129 km), east–west, 2-lane, state highway in Kentucky managed by the Kentucky Transportation Cabinet.

KY 34 begins at US 68 and KY 52 near Mitchellsburg and goes through Boyle and Garrard counties before terminating at Lexington Road (Old US 27) east of Danville just beyond US 27. KY 34 formerly terminated at US 27 before US 27 was rebuilt to the west. It serves as a primary connector between Danville and Lexington.

== Major intersections ==
County	Location	mi	km	Destinations	Notes
Boyle		0.000	0.000	US 68 (KY 52)	
Boyle	Brumfield	1.223	1.968	KY 1894 north (Brumfield Road)	former US 68 east
Boyle	Mitchellsburg	3.024	4.867	KY 1856 (Scrubgrass Road)	
Boyle	Mitchellsburg	3.273	5.267	KY 1108 south (Mitchellsburg Knob Road)	Northern terminus of KY 1108
Boyle	Parksville	6.115	9.841	KY 1822 south (Johnson Branch Road) / Harberson Lane	West end of KY 1822 overlap
Boyle	Parksville	6.298	10.136	KY 300 east (Alum Springs Road)	Western terminus of KY 300
Boyle		7.207	11.599	KY 1822 north (Parksville Cross Pike)	east end of KY 1822 overlap
Boyle	Danville	12.262	19.734	US 127 Byp. / US 150 Byp.	
Boyle	Danville	13.629	21.934	US 150 west / KY 52 west (Perryville Road)	West end of US 150 / KY 52 overlap
Boyle	Danville	13.893	22.359	US 127 north (Maple Avenue)	West end of US 127 overlap
Boyle	Danville			US 127 south (South 4th Street)	east end of US 127 south overlap (eastbound)
Boyle	Danville	14.469	23.286	KY 33 north (North 3rd Street)	East end of US 127 north overlap (westbound)
Boyle	Danville	14.801	23.820	US 150 east / KY 52 east (Stanford Avenue)	East end of US 150 / KY 52 overlap
Boyle	Danville	15.063	24.242	KY 2324 west (East Lexington Avenue)	Eastern terminus of KY 2324
Boyle	Danville	16.541	26.620	KY 1805 south (Goggin Lane)	Northern terminus of KY 1805
Boyle	Danville	16.703	26.881	KY 2168 west	Eastern terminus of KY 2168
Garrard		21.705	34.931	US 27 – Lexington, Lancaster	
Garrard		21.828	35.129	Camp Dick Road	former US 27
1.000 mi = 1.609 km; 1.000 km = 0.621 mi

== Alternate names ==
KY 34 has other names along its path:

- Lebanon Road from its western terminus into Danville.
- Main Street (US 150 and US 127) in Danville
- Wilderness Road in Danville
- Lexington Road from Danville to the Garrard County line
- Chenault Bridge Road in Garrard County

== Future ==
A new route (KY 2168) is planned to connect KY 34 and KY 33 northeast of Danville.
