= Ephraim McDowell =

American physician (1771–1830)

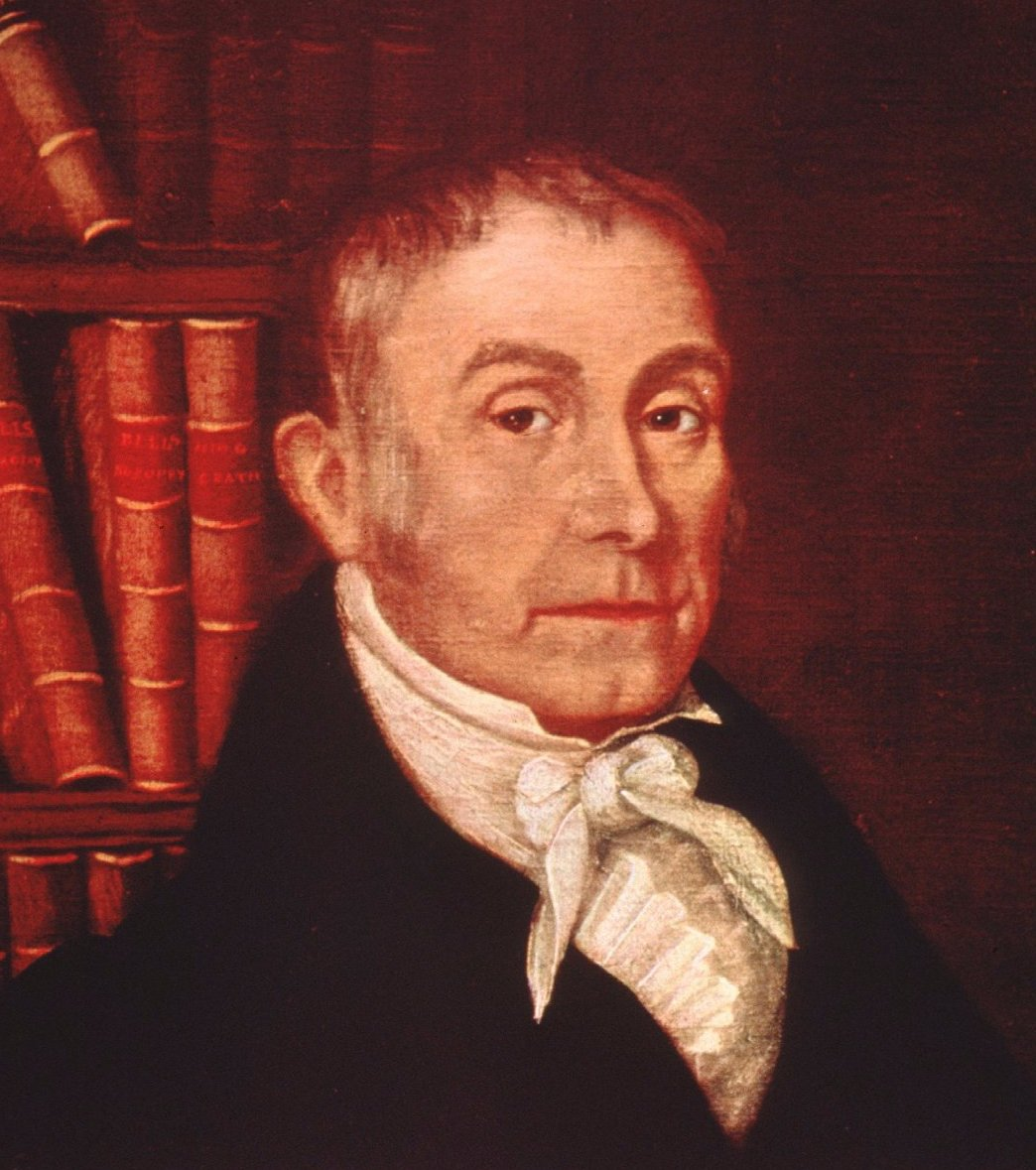
- Born: November 11, 1771; Rockbridge County, Virginia
- Died: June 25, 1830 (aged 58); Danville, Kentucky, U.S.
- Citizenship: United States
- Occupations: Physician; surgeon
- Known for: First successful ovariotomy
- Father: Samuel McDowell

Ephraim McDowell (November 11, 1771 – June 25, 1830) was an American medical doctor and pioneer surgeon. The first person to successfully remove an ovarian tumor, he has been called "the father of ovariotomy" as well as founding father of abdominal surgery.

== Early life ==
McDowell was born in Rockbridge County, Virginia, the ninth child of Samuel and Mary McDowell. His father was a veteran of the French and Indian War and a colonel during the American Revolution. In 1784 Samuel McDowell was appointed land commissioner and moved his family to Danville, Kentucky. There, he presided over ten conventions that resulted in the drafting of the Kentucky Constitution. Samuel was the 2nd great-grandfather of First Lady Mary Todd Lincoln, making her Ephraim McDowell's great-grandniece.

== Education ==
McDowell received his early education at the classical seminary of Worley and James, then spent three years as a medical student under Dr. Alexander Humphreys in Staunton, Virginia. He attended lectures in medicine at the University of Edinburgh, Scotland, from 1793 to 1794 and studied privately with John Bell. He never received a diploma, but in 1825, the University of Maryland conferred on him an honorary M.D. degree.

== Career ==
In 1795, McDowell returned from Scotland, settled in Danville, Kentucky, and began his practice as a surgeon. McDowell perfected the modern surgical technique of lithotomy, for removal of stones obstructing the urinary bladder. One of his most famous patients was James K. Polk, for whom he removed a urinary stone and repaired a hernia when Polk was a teenager.

=== Ovariotomies ===
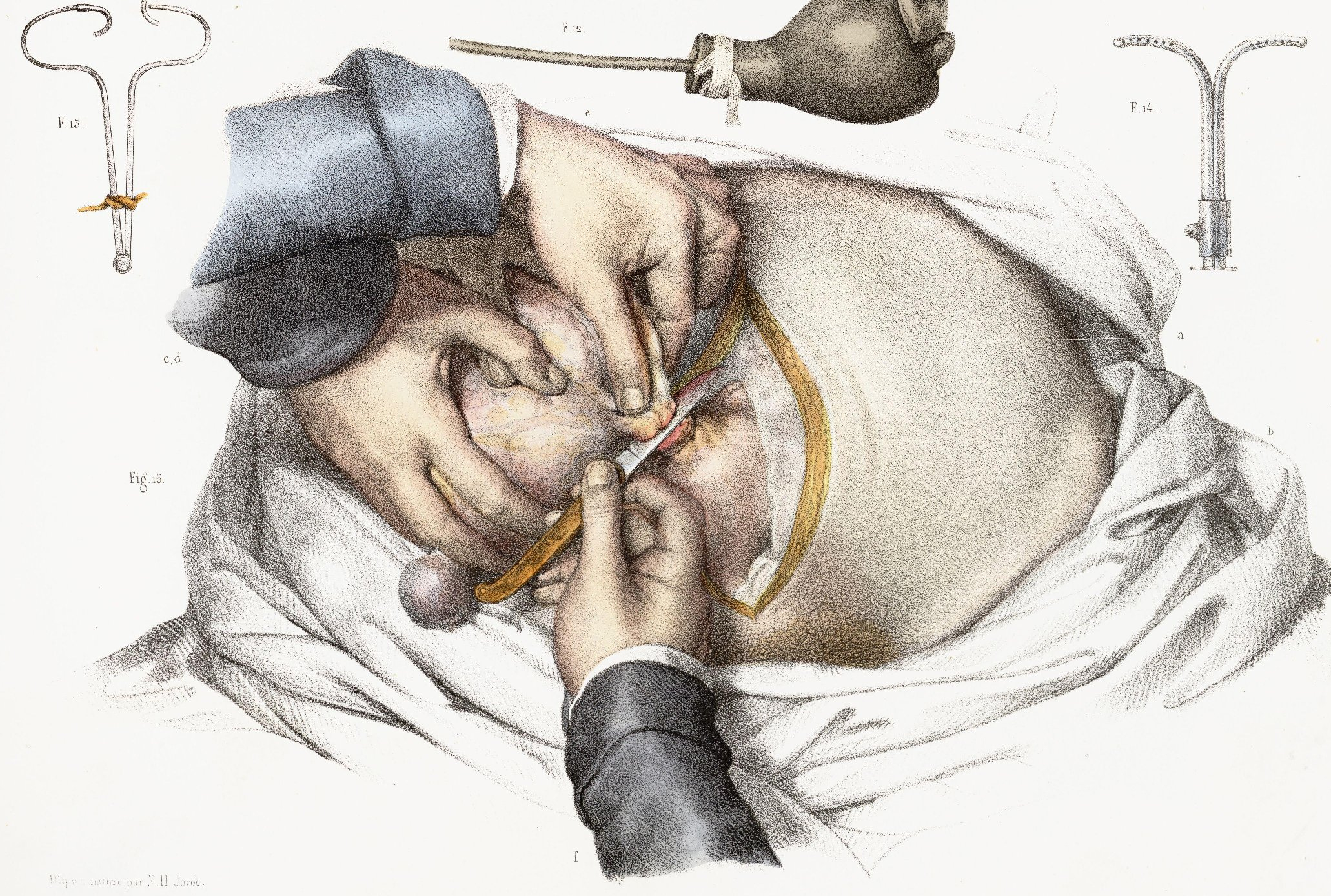
McDowell method to remove an ovarian cyst.

He developed his technique for performing ovariotomies through experimentation on the four women he enslaved.

On December 13, 1809, McDowell was called to see Jane Todd Crawford in Green County, Kentucky, 60 miles (97 km) from Danville. Her physicians thought that Mrs. Crawford was beyond term pregnant. McDowell diagnosed an ovarian tumor. Crawford begged him to keep her from a slow and painful death. He then described her condition and that an operation for cure had never been performed. He said that the best surgeons in the world thought it impossible. Crawford said she understood and wanted to proceed. McDowell told her he would remove the tumor if she would travel to his home in Danville. She agreed and rode the 60 miles on horseback.

On Christmas morning, 1809, McDowell began his operation. The surgery was performed without benefit of anesthetic or antisepsis, neither of which was then known to the medical profession. The tumor McDowell removed weighed 22.5 pounds (10.2 kg). He determined that it would be difficult to remove completely, so he tied a ligature around the fallopian tube near the uterus and cut open the tumor. He described the tumor as the ovarium and fimbrious part of the fallopian tube very much enlarged. The whole procedure took 25 minutes. Crawford made an uncomplicated recovery. She returned to her home in Green County 25 days after the operation and lived another 32 years. This was the first successful removal of an ovarian tumor in the world.

As a Presbyterian, McDowell's response to this event was recorded in one of his biographies:

How is it that I have been so peculiarly fortunate with my patients of this description?, I know not; for, from all the information I can obtain, there has not one individual survived who has been operated, on elsewhere, for diseased ovaria. I can only say that the blessing of God has rested on my efforts.

All attempts at abdominal exploration before 1809 had resulted in peritonitis and death. Descriptions of McDowell include phrases like "neat and clean" or "scrupulously clean." He was not only neat, but meticulous. In his report on the operation, he described the removal of blood from the peritoneal cavity and bathing the intestines with warm water.

McDowell did not publish a description of his procedure until 1817, after he had performed two more such operations. This was widely criticized in the English surgical literature. There is evidence that he performed at least 12 operations for ovarian pathology.

"Having never seen so large a substance extracted, nor heard of an attempt, or success attending any operation such as this required, I gave to the unhappy woman information of her dangerous situation. The tumor appeared full in view, but was so large we could not take it away entire. We took out fifteen pounds of a dirty, gelatinous looking substance. After which we cut through the fallopian tube, and extracted the sac, which weighed seven pounds and one half. In five days I visited her, and much to my astonishment found her making up her bed."

=== Later career ===
From 1809 and 1818, McDowell wrote about four separate ovariotomies following Crawford's. All four were performed on enslaved women, three of whom survived and one of whom died. It is unclear whether the enslaved women he performed surgeries on gave consent or received sufficient time to recover following the procedure.

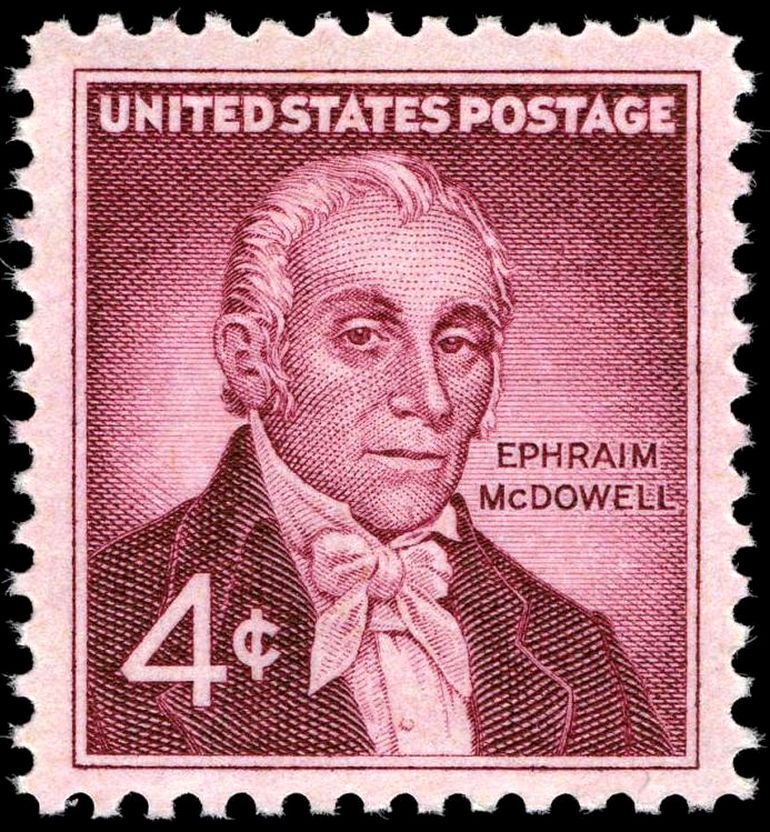
Commemorative stamp honoring Ephraim McDowell, issued December 3, 1959, the 150th anniversary of successful ovarian operation

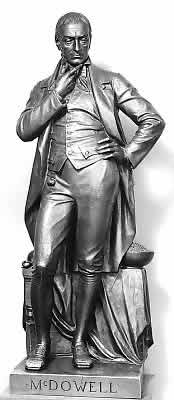
Ephraim McDowell's National Statuary Hall Collection statue

== Personal life ==
In 1802, McDowell married Sarah Shelby, daughter of war hero and two-time Kentucky governor Isaac Shelby. They had two sons and four daughters. He was a slaveholder.

McDowell played a prominent role in his community. He was also a founder, original corporator, and member of the primary board of trustees of Centre College in Danville. McDowell became a member of the Philadelphia Medical Society in 1817. McDowell was the great-great-grandfather of General John Campbell Greenway, whose statue was placed in the National Statuary Hall Collection by the state of Arizona in 1930. He was cousin to woman's suffrage leader Madeline McDowell Breckinridge.

McDowell was a Presbyterian but became an Episcopalian and founded Trinity Episcopal Church in Danville, Kentucky, having donated the land for its first building.

== Death ==
In June 1830, McDowell was stricken with an acute attack of violent pain, nausea, and fever. He died on June 25, most likely a victim of appendicitis. His wife died 18 years later. They were buried at "Traveller's Rest", the homestead of Isaac Shelby, south of Danville, Kentucky but were reinterred in 1879, near a monument dedicated to him in Danville.

== Honors ==
- In 1879, a monument in his honor was erected by the Medical Society of Kentucky in Danville.
- In 1929, Isaac Wolfe Bernheim donated a bronze statue of McDowell by Charles Henry Niehaus to the state of Kentucky for placement in the U.S. Capitol's National Statuary Hall Collection. The statue depicts the ovarian tumor that McDowell removed from Jane Crawford, sitting in a bowl on the table behind McDowell. An identical statue by the same artist stands in the rotunda of the Kentucky State Capitol in Frankfort, Kentucky.
- In 1959, on December 3, the U.S. Post office first issued a 4-cent commemorative stamp honoring McDowell, in the Danville, Kentucky, post office, marking the 150th anniversary of the first successful ovarian operation.
- McDowell's house, office, and apothecary in Danville are preserved as a museum and are designated a National Historic Landmark.
- Ephraim McDowell Regional Medical Center in Danville is named in his honor.
