= Ephraim McDowell House =

Historic house in Kentucky, United States

- Dr. Ephraim McDowell House
- U.S. National Register of Historic Places
- U.S. National Historic Landmark
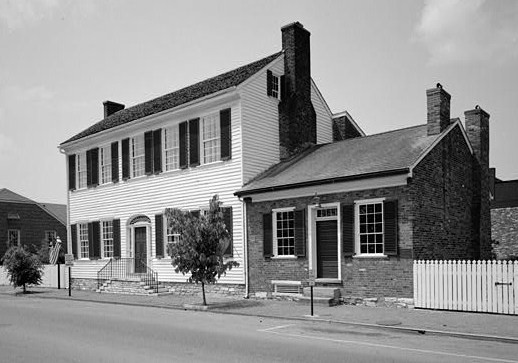
- Dr. Ephraim McDowell House and Apothecary

- Location within Kentucky Location within the United States
- Location: 125–127 S. 2nd St., Danville, Kentucky
- Coordinates: 37°38′42″N 84°46′16″W
- Area: less than one acre
- Built: 1795
- Architectural style: Federal style
- NRHP reference No.: 66000355

Significant dates
- Added to NRHP: October 15, 1966
- Designated NHL: January 12, 1965

The Dr. Ephraim McDowell House, also known as McDowell House, was a home of medical doctor Ephraim McDowell.

The home was declared a U.S. National Historic Landmark in 1966 for its role as the site of the world's first ovariotomy, performed without anesthesia by Dr. McDowell in 1809.

== Ephraim McDowell biography ==
Ephraim McDowell (November 11, 1771 – June 25, 1830) was an American physician.

He was born in Rockbridge County, Virginia and moved with his family to Danville, Kentucky in 1784. He studied under Dr. Humphrey in Staunton, Virginia, then attended lectures in medicine at the University of Edinburgh, Scotland, from 1793 to 1794 and studied privately with John Bell. In 1795. he returned from Scotland, settled in Danville, Kentucky and began his practice as a surgeon.

Dr. McDowell played a prominent role in his community. He was a founder of Trinity Episcopal Church in Danville and a founder and original corporator of Centre College in Danville. Dr. McDowell became a member of the Philadelphia Medical Society in 1817.

He removed a urinary stone and repaired a hernia for James K. Polk.

On December 13, 1809, Dr. McDowell diagnosed an ovarian tumor in Jane Todd Crawford of Green County, Kentucky, In his house on Christmas morning, 1809, Dr. McDowell removed a 22.5-pound (10.2 kg) tumor without anesthetic or antisepsis. Mrs. Crawford made an uncomplicated recovery, returning to her home 25 days later and living another 32 years. This was the first successful removal of an ovarian tumor in the world.

== House history ==
The house was built in three stages. A brick ell was constructed 1792–1795. Dr. McDowell purchased it in late 1802. He added the front, clapboard portion in 1803–1804 and the small brick office to the left of the back porch in 1820. The house was remodeled at the same time.

After McDowell's death in 1830 the house was sold. It was the home of a Centre College president for a short time. Later the entire area became slum and tenement property. The house deteriorated badly. Dr. August Schachner, of Louisville, led the efforts to buy the house for restoration. In 1921 he visited the house. "Since our last visit, the house has continued its downward course until it has reached a point where it now seems almost beyond redemption. The room that served as the original office of Dr. McDowell is now used as a shoe-shining booth for Negroes. The room in the rear of the corresponding front room on the second floor,"(the operating room) "which is on a lower level by several feet, is used as a dump for the ashes from the grates of the rooms on the second floor."

The Kentucky Medical Association bought the house in 1935 and deeded it to the state of Kentucky, who had it restored by Works Progress Administration (WPA). It was dedicated on May 20, 1939. In 1948, Kentucky returned the property to the Kentucky Medical Association.

The Kentucky Pharmaceutical Society restored the Apothecary Shop in the late 1950s with help from the Eli Lily Foundation. It was furnished by the Pfizer Laboratories. It was dedicated and presented to the Kentucky Medical Association on August 14, 1959.
