= Traveler's Rest (Shelby City, Kentucky) =

- U.S. National Register of Historic Places
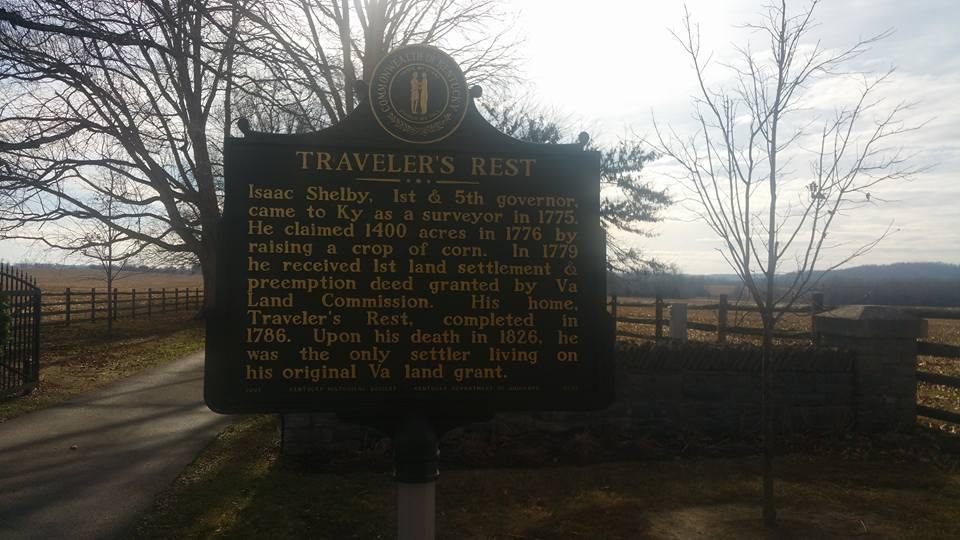
- Historical marker at entrance

- Location within Kentucky Location within the United States
- Location: Lincoln County, Kentucky
- Coordinates: 37.564386°N 84.783792°W
- Built: 1906
- Architectural style: Georgian, Federal Revival
- NRHP reference No.: 76000914
- Added to NRHP: May 3, 1976

Traveler's Rest in Lincoln County, Kentucky is the historic home place of Isaac Shelby, the first Governor of Kentucky. Shelby acquired the property as the first land settlement preemption deed in Kentucky as a reward for his surveying services. The original house was built in 1786 of limestone, three feet thick. It stood until a fire in 1905. On the same site, a brick two-story house was built by Shelby's descendants. Built in 1906 in the Georgian and Federal revival styles, it was accepted into the U.S. National Register of Historic Places in 1976 for its association with Shelby. Shelby's original brick slave's quarters still stand on the property. The Isaac Shelby Cemetery State Historic Site on the same property, where Shelby and his family are buried, is open to the public. The house at Traveler's Rest is privately owned and is not open to the public.

== See also ==
- National Register of Historic Places listings in Kentucky
