= Junction City, Kentucky =

- City
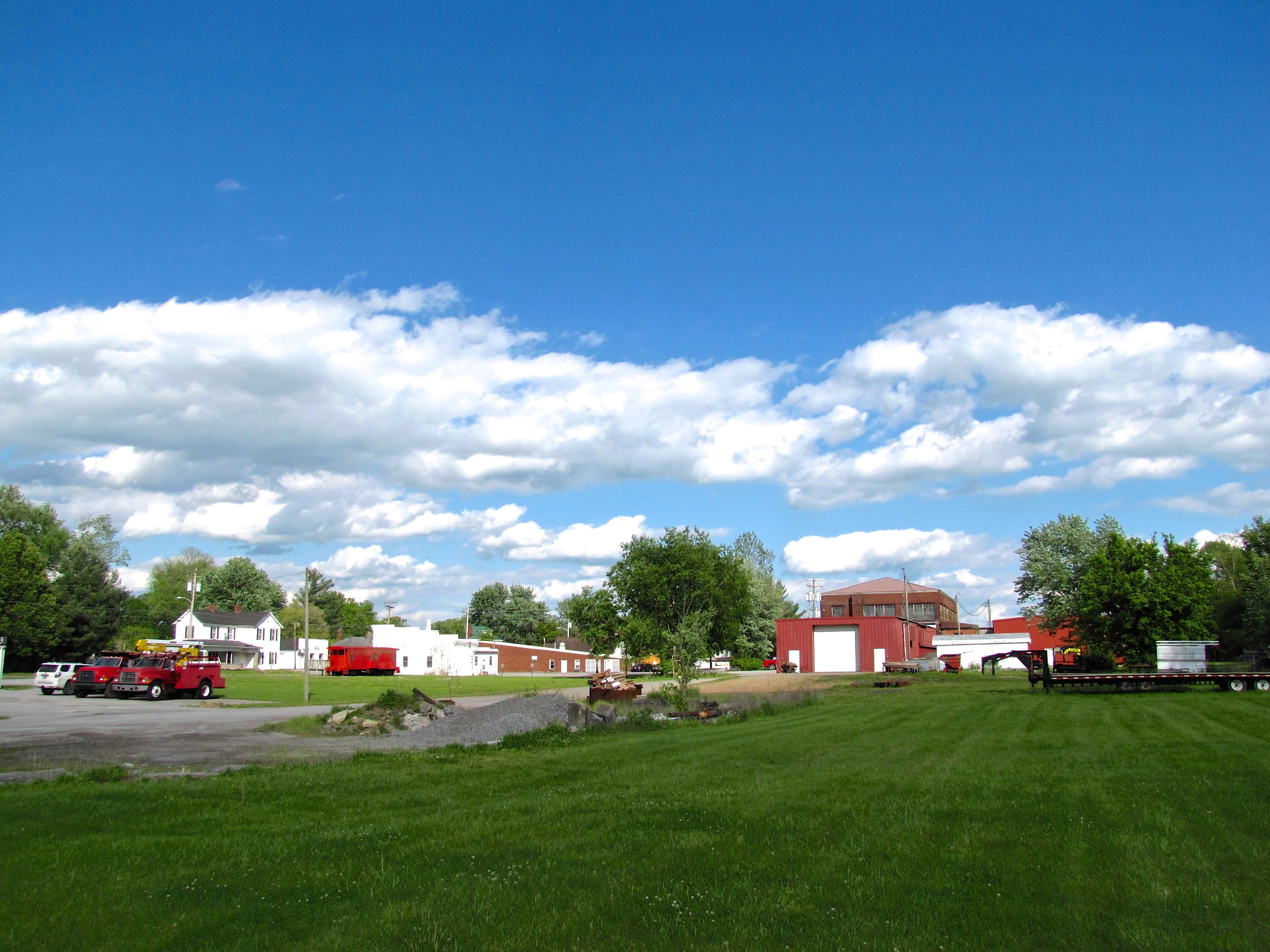
- Junction City

- Location of Junction City in Boyle County, Kentucky.
- Coordinates: 37°35′07″N 84°47′25″W
- Country: United States
- State: Kentucky
- Counties: Boyle
- Incorporated: April 8, 1882
- Named after: the L&N and Cincinnati Southern railroads

Government
  - Type: Mayor-council government

Area
  - Total: 2.01 sq mi (5.21 km^{2})
  - Land: 2.01 sq mi (5.20 km^{2})
  - Water: 0.0039 sq mi (0.01 km^{2})
- Elevation: 984 ft (300 m)

Population (2020)
  - Total: 2,268
  - Estimate (2022): 2,290
  - Density: 1,130.6/sq mi (436.54/km^{2})
- Time zone: UTC-5 (Eastern (EST))
  - Summer (DST): UTC-4 (EDT)
- ZIP code: 40440
- Area code: 859
- FIPS code: 21-41338
- GNIS feature ID: 2404815
- Website: jcky.us

Junction City is a home rule-class city in Boyle County, with a small portion extending into Lincoln County, in the U.S. state of Kentucky. As of the 2020 census, Junction City had a population of 2,268. It is part of the Danville Micropolitan Statistical Area.

== History ==
Junction City began when the Louisville and Nashville Railroad reached the area. It was originally known as "Goresburg" for the proprietors of the Gore Hotel. The Gore post office opened in 1880, and was renamed Goresburg in 1882. The town was renamed "Junction City" when the Cincinnati Southern Railway reached town later that year, its tracks intersecting those of the L&N. The city was formally incorporated April 8, 1882, by the state assembly. The L&N station there was known as "Danville Junction" for its proximity to the larger city of Danville.

The southeastern part of Junction City was once the separate town of Shelby City, incorporated in 1867, and named for Kentucky's first governor Isaac Shelby, who lived and was buried nearby. This community's separate post office was known as "South Danville" when it was established April 26, 1866, renamed Shelby City the next year (the eastern portion of Junction City is still known as Shelby City), and closed in 1926. It was also known as "Briartown" and its L&N station was called "Danville Station". The tomb of Kentucky's first governor, Isaac Shelby, and his homestead Traveler's Rest, is located across the Lincoln County line, just south of this part of town.

== Geography ==
According to the United States Census Bureau, the city has a total area of 1.9 square miles (4.8 km^{2}), all land.

The city lies in a broad valley south of Danville, and just north of the border between Boyle and Lincoln counties. Much of Junction City is concentrated along Shelby Street between the Cincinnati Southern tracks on the west and U.S. Route 127 on the east. The part of town east of US 127 is known as "Shelby City." Kentucky Route 37 and Kentucky Route 300 intersect in northwestern Junction City.

== Demographics ==
Historical population
| Census | Pop. | Note | %± |
|---|---|---|---|
| 1880 | 174 | | — |
| 1890 | 648 | | 272.4% |
| 1900 | 817 | | 26.1% |
| 1910 | 747 | | −8.6% |
| 1920 | 722 | | −3.3% |
| 1930 | 781 | | 8.2% |
| 1940 | 694 | | −11.1% |
| 1950 | 988 | | 42.4% |
| 1960 | 1,047 | | 6.0% |
| 1970 | 1,046 | | −0.1% |
| 1980 | 2,045 | | 95.5% |
| 1990 | 1,983 | | −3.0% |
| 2000 | 2,184 | | 10.1% |
| 2010 | 2,241 | | 2.6% |
| 2020 | 2,268 | | 1.2% |
| 2022 (est.) | 2,290 | | 1.0% |
U.S. Decennial Census

=== 2020 census ===
As of the 2020 census, Junction City had a population of 2,268. The median age was 39.5 years. 25.0% of residents were under the age of 18 and 16.1% of residents were 65 years of age or older. For every 100 females there were 92.2 males, and for every 100 females age 18 and over there were 83.0 males age 18 and over.

98.2% of residents lived in urban areas, while 1.8% lived in rural areas.

There were 928 households in Junction City, of which 33.6% had children under the age of 18 living in them. Of all households, 40.1% were married-couple households, 16.5% were households with a male householder and no spouse or partner present, and 35.9% were households with a female householder and no spouse or partner present. About 30.4% of all households were made up of individuals and 14.0% had someone living alone who was 65 years of age or older.

There were 1,018 housing units, of which 8.8% were vacant. The homeowner vacancy rate was 1.0% and the rental vacancy rate was 4.0%.

Racial composition as of the 2020 census
| Race | Number | Percent |
|---|---|---|
| White | 2,010 | 88.6% |
| Black or African American | 49 | 2.2% |
| American Indian and Alaska Native | 3 | 0.1% |
| Asian | 11 | 0.5% |
| Native Hawaiian and Other Pacific Islander | 0 | 0.0% |
| Some other race | 74 | 3.3% |
| Two or more races | 121 | 5.3% |
| Hispanic or Latino (of any race) | 126 | 5.6% |

=== 2000 census ===
As of the census of 2000, there were 2,184 people, 876 households, and 617 families residing in the city. The population density was 1,088.3 people per square mile (420.2 people/km^{2}). There were 945 housing units at an average density of 470.9 units per square mile (181.8 units/km^{2}). The racial makeup of the city was 97.53% White, 1.05% African American, 0.09% Native American, 0.27% Asian, 0.73% from other races, and 0.32% from two or more races. Hispanic or Latino of any race were 3.85% of the population.

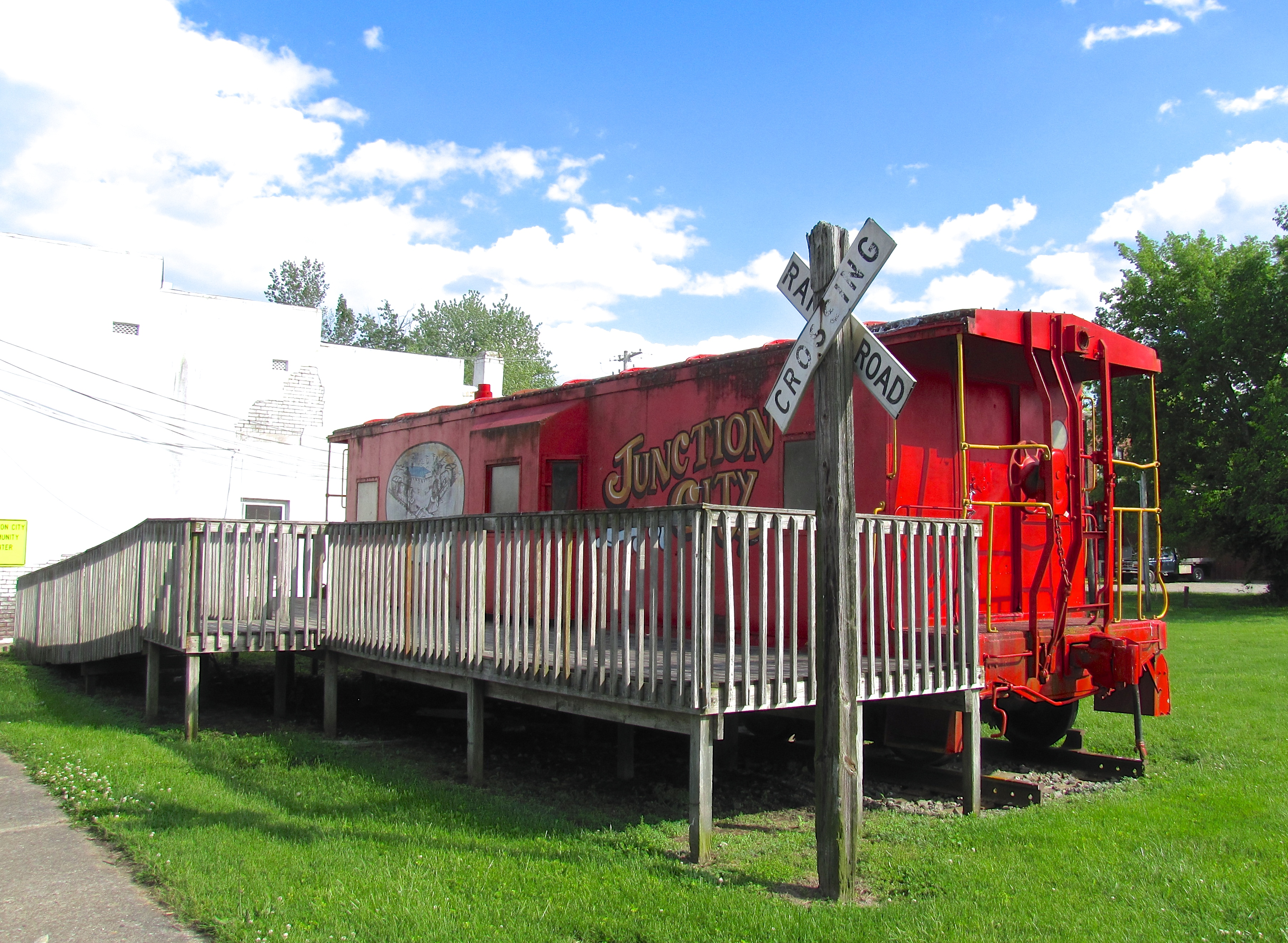
Caboose on display in Junction City

There were 876 households, out of which 34.8% had children under the age of 18 living with them, 47.4% were married couples living together, 18.8% had a female householder with no husband present, and 29.5% were non-families. 25.6% of all households were made up of individuals, and 12.3% had someone living alone who was 65 years of age or older. The average household size was 2.49 and the average family size was 2.93.

27.3% of the population was under the age of 18, 8.7% from 18 to 24, 30.1% from 25 to 44, 21.8% from 45 to 64, and 12.0% who were 65 years of age or older. The median age was 34 years. For every 100 females, there were 87.3 males. For every 100 females age 18 and over, there were 83.8 males.

The median income for a household in the city was US $29,569, and the median income for a family was $32,609. Males had a median income of $25,700 versus $21,688 for females. The per capita income for the city was $13,258. About 14.5% of families and 16.9% of the population were below the poverty line, including 19.5% of those under age 18 and 20.4% of those age 65 or over.

== Education ==
The Boyle County portion (the vast majority of the municipality) is in Boyle County Schools.

The Lincoln County portion is in the Lincoln County School District, which is the sole school district of that county.
