= Aliceton, Kentucky =

Unincorporated community in Kentucky, United States

Coordinates: 37°35′27″N 85°01′48″W

Aliceton is an unincorporated community in Boyle County, Kentucky, in the United States.

== History ==
Aliceton was a station on the railroad. A post office was established at Aliceton in 1866, and remained in operation until it was discontinued in 1941.
