= Wilsonville, Boyle County, Kentucky =

Unincorporated community in Kentucky, United States

Coordinates: 37°35′39″N 84°52′39″W

Wilsonville is an unincorporated community in Boyle County, Kentucky. It is part of the Micropolitan Statistical Area of Danville, Kentucky.

Former slave, Charlie Wilson, began purchasing land after the Civil War, then sold it to freed Blacks. By 1870 there was a Freedman's Bureau Freedmen's Bureau school with 48 students, and by 1880 there was an African Methodist Episcopal (AME) Church there, functions at the school raising money to build the church there.

The Wilsonville School operated from about 1876 until 1964 when it was closed. Wilson Chapel AME Church was in use until the mid-2010s, but is now defunct, all members having either died or moved out of the area.

The Wilsonville Cemetery, adjoining the church, is still somewhat active, receiving a few burials after 2000.

Former NFL player Jim Marshall was born in Wilsonville in 1937.
