= Waveland (Danville, Kentucky) =

Historic house in Kentucky, United States

- U.S. National Register of Historic Places
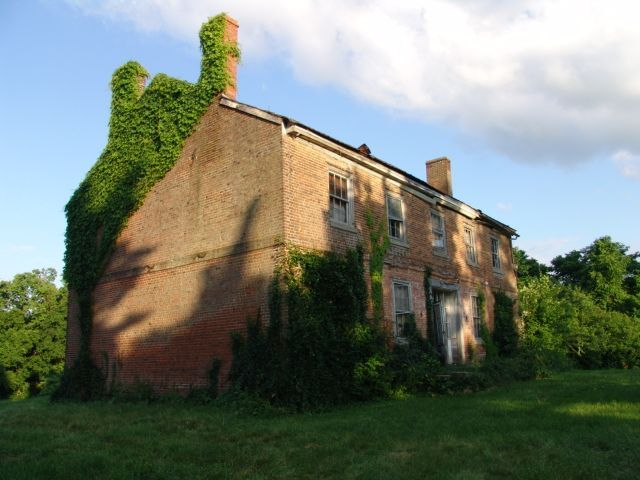
- Waveland House

- Location within Kentucky Location within the United States
- Location: 120 West Erskine Road
- Nearest city: Danville, Kentucky
- Coordinates: 37°37′28″N 84°46′6″W
- Area: 3 acres (1.2 ha)
- Built: 1797
- Architect: Green, Willis
- Architectural style: Georgian
- NRHP reference No.: 76000850
- Added to NRHP: May 06, 1976

Waveland, a historic estate located at 120 West Erksine Rd in Danville, Kentucky.

== History ==
Waveland is the ancestral home of the Green family. It was built between 1797 and 1800 by Willis Green. The Green lore, as related around Danville, in the Southern Bluegrass region of Kentucky, begins with Willis and Sarah Reed Green, the parents of John Green and grandparents of Thomas Marshall Green, whose direct descendants include Adlai Stevenson I, whose great-grandson is Adlai Stevenson IV.

Willis and Sarah, of Scotch-Irish descent, were born and reared in the Shenandoah Valley of Virginia, and were married near Danville in 1783. This is said to have been the first Christian marriage in Kentucky.

Willis had come to Kentucky in a surveying party, and had located for himself a tract of several thousand acres that struck his fancy a mile or two from the Danville settlement. Here he built, between 1797 and 1800, the fine large brick house for years called Waveland. The Willis Greens had twelve children, of whom the eldest, John, the lawyer, and the youngest, Lewis, the clergyman, are now most widely remembered.

Willis Green represented Kentucky County in the Virginia legislature, and later served also in Kentucky's own legislature. He held office, too, as clerk of the court of Lincoln County, which then included Danville and what is now Boyle County. History books note that he held other various important trusts and was one of the early valuable men of the Kentucky country.

Waveland was passed down from Willis Green to his son Lewis Warner Green, who is known as the fifth president of Centre College in Danville, Kentucky.
