= Kentucky Route 33 =

State highway in Kentucky, United States

Kentucky Route 33
- KY 33 highlighted in red

Route information
- Maintained by KYTC
- Length: 32.094 mi (51.650 km)

Major junctions
- South end: US 150 in Danville
- US 68 / KY 29 north of Burgin; US 68 / KY 29 west of Wilmore; Bluegrass Parkway south of Versailles
- North end: US 62 in Versailles

Location
- Country: United States
- State: Kentucky
- Counties: Boyle, Mercer, Jessamine, Woodford

Highway system
- Kentucky State Highway System; Interstate; US; State; Parkways
← KY 32	→ KY 34

Kentucky Route 33 (KY 33) is a 32.094-mile-long (51.650 km), two-lane, north–south state highway in Kentucky managed by the Kentucky Transportation Cabinet.

KY 33 begins at US 150 in Danville and proceeds north through Boyle, Mercer, Jessamine, and Woodford counties before terminating at US 62 in Versailles. It shares the road with US 68 in Jessamine and Mercer counties and crosses the Kentucky River near Wilmore.

== Major intersections ==
County	Location	mi	km	Destinations	Notes
Boyle	Danville	0.000	0.000	US 127 / US 150 / KY 34 / KY 52	Southern terminus
Boyle	Danville	0.220	0.354	KY 2324 east (West Lexington Avenue)	Western terminus of KY 2324
Boyle	Danville	2.279	3.668	KY 2168	
Boyle		4.407	7.092	KY 1896 west (Faulkner Lane)	Western terminus of KY 1896
Mercer	Burgin	7.719	12.423	KY 152	
Mercer	Burgin	8.219	13.227	KY 342 north (Curdsville Road)	Southern terminus of KY 342
Mercer		11.354	18.272	KY 342 south (Dix Dam Road)	Northern terminus of KY 342
Mercer		12.689	20.421	US 68 west (Lexington Road)	South end of US 68 overlap
Jessamine		21.311	34.297	US 68 east (Harrodsburg Road)	North end of US 68 overlap
Woodford		19.090	30.722	KY 1965 north (Mundys Landing Road)	Southern terminus of KY 1965
Woodford		21.312	34.298	KY 1267 east (Keene Troy Pike)	Western terminus of KY 1267
Woodford		28.929	46.557	KY 169 south (Pinckard Pike)	Northern terminus of KY 169
Woodford		30.170	48.554	Bluegrass Parkway – Lexington, Lawrenceburg, Elizabethtown	BG Pkwy exit 68
Woodford	Versailles	30.628	49.291	KY 2113 north (Falling Springs Boulevard) / Old Dry Ridge Road	Southern terminus of KY 2113
Woodford	Versailles	32.094	51.650	US 62 (Rose Hill Avenue / Main Street) / Morgan Street	Northern terminus
1.000 mi = 1.609 km; 1.000 km = 0.621 mi

== Alternate names ==
KY 33 has other names along its path:

- Third Street in Danville
- Shakertown Road in Boyle County and Danville
- Danville Burgin Road in Mercer County
- Danville Street in Burgin
- Pleasant Hill Road in Burgin and Mercer County
- Shakertown Road in Mercer County
- Lexington Road (US 68) in Mercer County
- Harrodsburg Road (US 68) in Jessamine County
- Pekin Pike in Woodford and Jessamine Counties
- Troy Pike in Woodford County
- Main Street in Versailles
