= Isaac Shelby Cemetery State Historic Site =

Park in Lincoln County, Kentucky

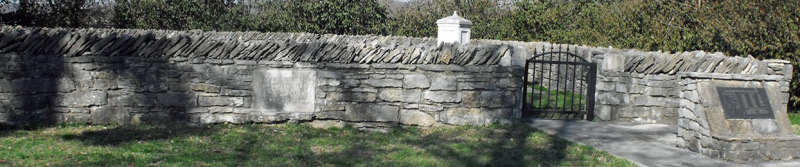

- Location within Kentucky Location within the United States
- Location: Lincoln County, Kentucky, United States
- Coordinates: 37°34′12″N 84°46′45″W
- Area: .5 acres (0.20 ha)
- Established: 1951
- Administrator: Kentucky Department of Parks
- Website: Official website

Isaac Shelby Cemetery State Historic Site is a park in Junction City, Kentucky, United States. It marks the estate and burial ground of Kentucky's first governor, Isaac Shelby. The site became part of the park system in 1951.
