= Parksville, Kentucky =

Unincorporated community in Kentucky, United States

Coordinates: 37.597852°N 84.891342°W

Parksville is a small unincorporated community on the Chaplin River in south central Boyle County, Kentucky, United States. It is located at the eastern end of Ky Route 300, where it intersects with Ky Route 34, near the US Post Office. The global position of Parksville is 37.597N latitude and -84.891W longitude. Elevation is 1,083 feet (330 m) above sea level. Current population is approximately 900 people. The ZIP Code for Parksville is 40464.

== History ==
Chapter 1916, of the Laws of Kentucky, 1867 says, in part: "AN ACT to incorporate the Town of Parksville, in Boyle County. Be it enacted by the General Assembly of the Commonwealth of Kentucky: 1. That the town, in the county of Boyle, situated on the Clark's Run and Salt River turnpike and the Lebanon extension of the Louisville and Nashville railroad, known as Parksville, be, and the same is hereby, incorporated and established as the town of Parksville. ... 10. The limits of said town shall extend one quarter of a mile in every direction from the center thereof at the crossroads at W. D. Latimer's storehouse." In 1880 (Laws of Kentucky, Chapter 617), the boundary was modified so as to include the cemetery and the Christian church, "the line to run north and south with the [sic] on the east side of said cemetery."

When the "Town of Parksville" was de-incorporated is not known at this time, but today Parksville is an unincorporated village.

Parksville was founded by James Parks who is buried in the Parksville Cemetery. It is located near the geographical center of the state of Kentucky at the intersection of Kentucky Route 300 and Kentucky Route 34.

Parksville had a major railroad depot for the county from 1866 until 1970. Passengers would travel 10 miles (16 km) from Danville to board the L&N Railroad car. Freight was also shipped from this depot. A small lake, known as Tank Pond, was built in 1920 by the railroad southwest of town for the purpose of refilling steam locomotive engines. Harbison Lane crossed under the L&N Railroad until October 1987, when the trains stopped running. The tracks have been removed.

Parksville High School was operating from about 1926 until the 1963, when Boyle County closed all the rural high schools, and from that time on Parksville was served by the Boyle County High School. The original building is now a private home, located less than a mile west of the post office on Ky Route 34.

Today, Parksville has a post office, a general store, a Baptist Church (founded in 1923), a Church of Christ, a small sit-down restaurant, and another under renovation, a two-engine fire department, a volunteer rescue squad, and several unoccupied commercial buildings. In addition, the Parksville Water District serves a large portion of western and southern Boyle County, as well as northern parts of Casey County.

Nearby is the Stone Bridge at Chaplin Creek. The 500-acre (2.0 km^{2}) Central Kentucky Wildlife Refuge lies 3 miles (4.8 km) south of Parksville, just off Ky Route 37, near the Forkland community.

Parksville is served by the Boyle County Sheriff's Department and the Danville/Boyle County Fire Department. The nearest hospital is Ephraim McDowell Regional Medical Center in the nearby county seat of Danville.

Media in Parksville include The Advocate-Messenger, local newspaper of Danville, and the three local AM/FM radio stations, including the Hometown Radio Network (WRNZ- Z105; 105.1FM/1230AM). Local television broadcast includes LEX-18 (Lexington) and FOX-56 (Lexington/Danville).
