= Mitchellsburg, Kentucky =

Unincorporated community in Kentucky, United States

- Unincorporated community
- Location within Kentucky
- Coordinates: 37°36′02″N 84°56′59″W
- Country: United States
- State: Kentucky
- County: Boyle
- Elevation: 997 ft (304 m)
- Time zone: UTC-5 (Eastern (EST))
  - Summer (DST): UTC-4 (EDT)
- ZIP code: 40452
- Area code: 859
- GNIS feature ID: 498457

Mitchellsburg is an unincorporated community in Boyle County, Kentucky, United States. Mitchellsburg is located on Kentucky Route 34 10.2 miles (16.4 km) west-southwest of Danville. Mitchellsburg had a post office until April 12, 2008; it still has its own ZIP code, 40452.
