= Brumfield, Kentucky =

Unincorporated community in Kentucky, United States

Coordinates: 37°36′15″N 84°58′56″W

Brumfield is an unincorporated community in Boyle County, Kentucky, in the United States.

== History ==
Brumfield was a station on the railroad. A post office was established at Brumfield in 1880, and remained in operation until it was discontinued in 1938.
