= Boyle County Courthouse =

- U.S. National Register of Historic Places
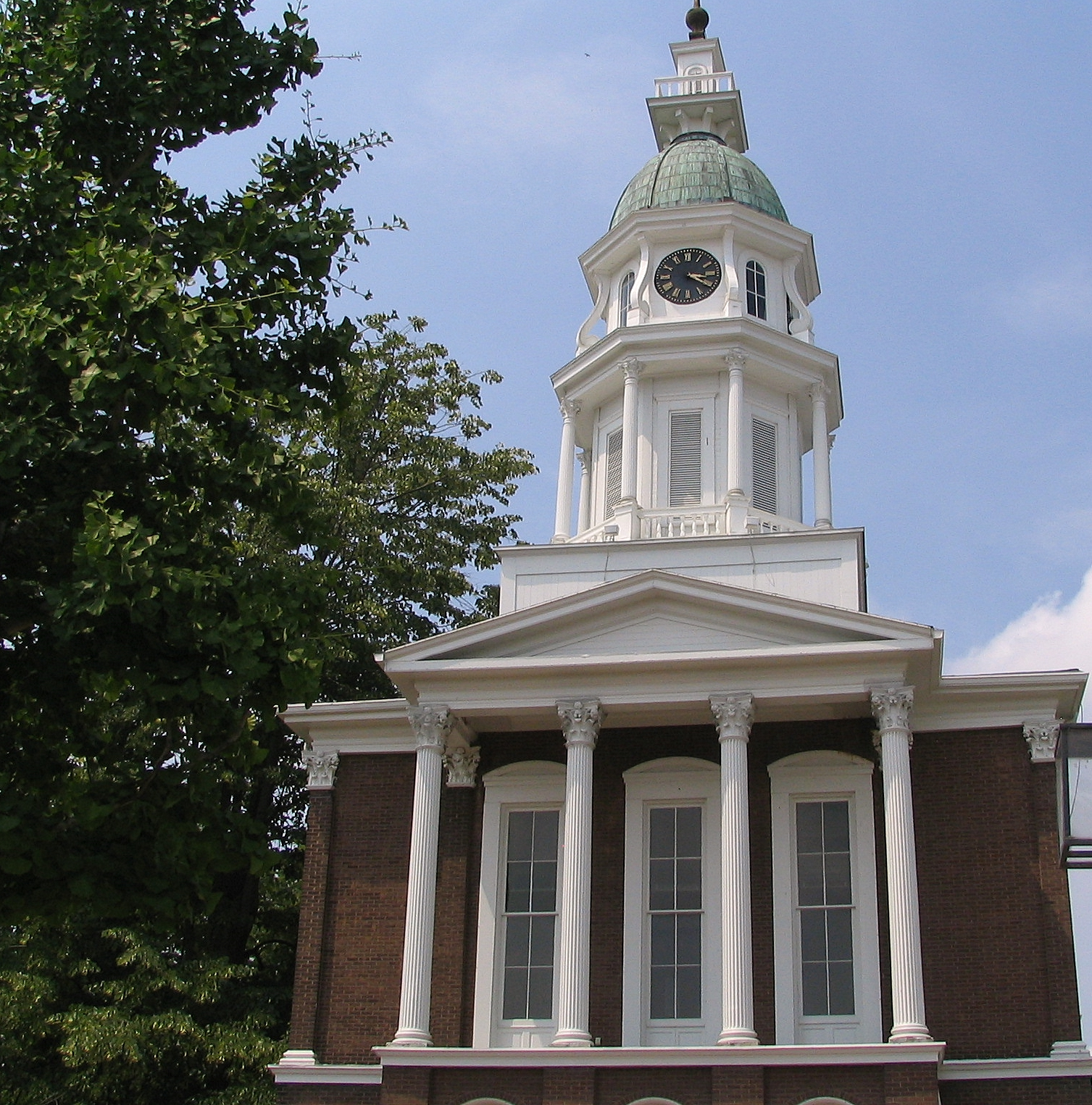

- Location within Kentucky Location within the United States
- Interactive map showing the location of Boyle County Courthouse
- Location: Main and 4th Sts., Danville, Kentucky
- Coordinates: 37°38′47″N 84°46′24″W
- Area: 1.5 acres (0.61 ha)
- Built: 1862
- Built by: James R. Carrigan
- Architect: James R. Carrigan
- Architectural style: Renaissance
- NRHP reference No.: 73000790
- Added to NRHP: April 11, 1973

The Boyle County Courthouse, at Main and 4th Sts. in Danville, Kentucky, was built in 1862. It was listed on the National Register of Historic Places in 1973.

The listing was for the two-building complex of the courthouse and the associated jail, built in 1875, and Mid-town Park, in between.

The courthouse was designed by architect James R. Carrigan to replace the former courthouse, destroyed in the Great Fire of 1860. Soon after the courthouse was completed, the bloodiest American Civil War battle in Kentucky occurred, the Battle of Perryville, on October 8, 1862. Like all other large buildings in town, the courthouse was commandeered to serve as a hospital. Court was held elsewhere in 1873, and some damage to the courthouse was still being repaired from 1873 to 1875.
