= Trinity Episcopal Church (Danville, Kentucky) =

- U.S. National Register of Historic Places
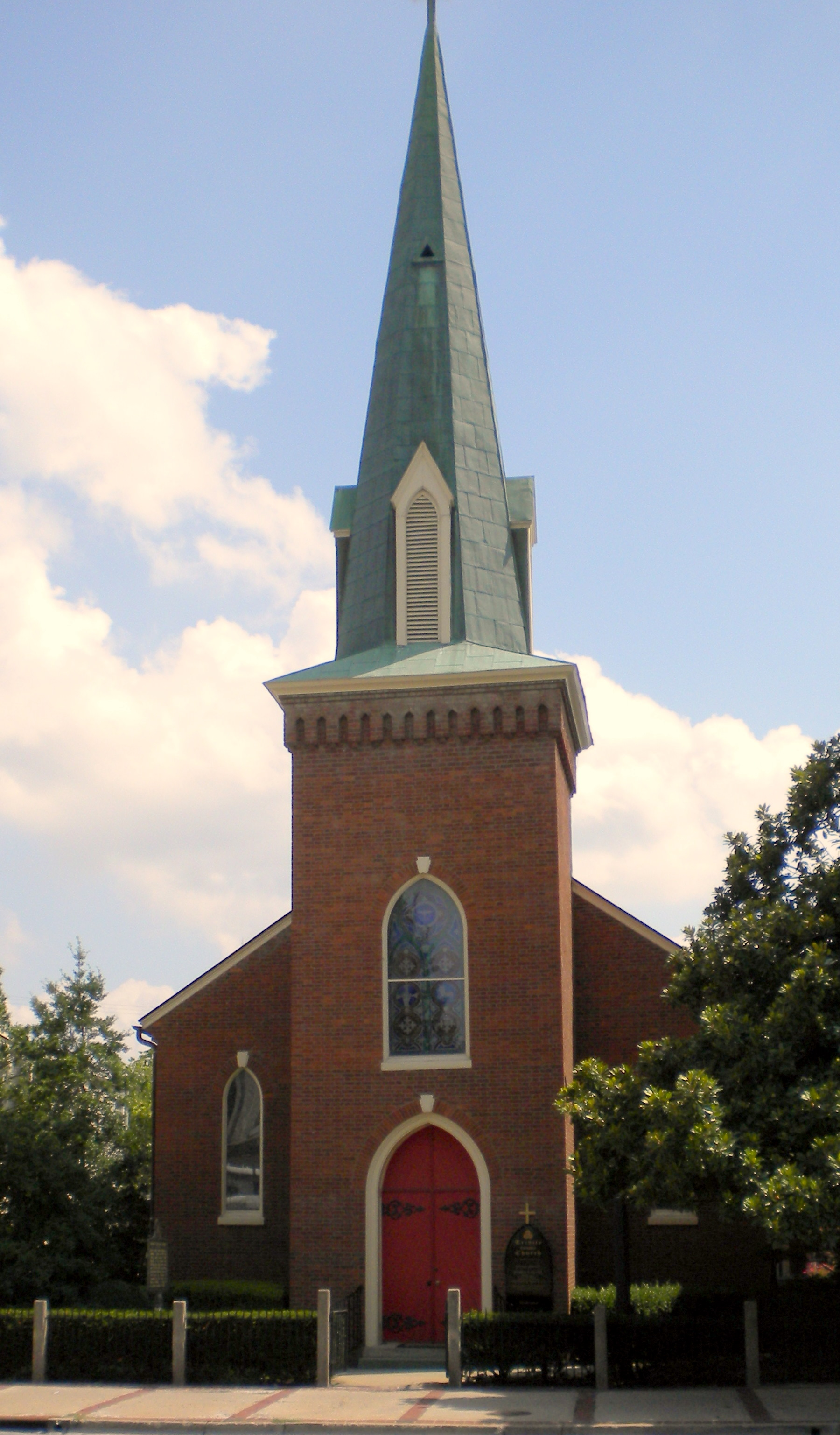

- Location within Kentucky Location within the United States
- Location: 320 W. Main Street; Danville, Kentucky
- Coordinates: 37°38′44″N 84°46′24″W
- Built: 1830
- Architect: Robert Russel, Jr.
- Architectural style: Gothic Revival
- NRHP reference No.: 77000604
- Added to NRHP: September 15, 1977

Trinity Episcopal Church in Danville, Kentucky, was one of the first churches organized in the Episcopal Diocese of Kentucky. Trinity Church is the oldest in-use church structure in Danville and the oldest continuously used Episcopal church building in the Episcopal Diocese of Lexington as well as the second oldest in Kentucky. It is listed in the National Register of Historic Places.

== History ==
The origin of the Episcopal church in Kentucky dates to 1796 when Christ Church in Lexington was organized. It wasn't until 1809, however, that the parish was formally established when the first vestry was elected. In 1822 a second Episcopal church was established in Louisville, it too being named Christ Church. The building, which is now Christ Church Cathedral, was completed in 1824. In 1829 Reverend George T. Chapman, rector of Lexington's Christ Church from 1820 to 1830, proposed the formation of a Diocese. In working towards this goal, Reverend Chapman visited Danville and organized a congregation. The group of local citizens who were instrumental in the formation of the new church were mostly physicians, lawyers, bankers, merchants, and landowners. Members of the committee formed to erect a church building included Dr. Ephraim McDowell and his wife, Sarah Shelby McDowell, daughter of Isaac Shelby, the first Governor of Kentucky. Another influential member and largest contributor to the church was James Birney, a wealthy merchant, who was the father of James G. Birney, the prominent abolitionist.

The new church building, completed in late 1830 or early 1831, was built by Robert Russel Jr., a local brick maker and mason. Russel, a native of Virginia, settled in Danville in 1805. He built almost all of the early brick buildings in Danville, including Old Centre in 1820. Russel's fees must have been modest for the vestry minutes indicate that it was decided to begin construction as soon as $1,500 had been subscribed. The new building was consecrated on June 3, 1831, by the Reverend William Meade, then assistant Bishop of the Diocese of Virginia, who was to become one of the most influential leaders of the Episcopal Church. The new Kentucky Diocese, having at this time no bishop of its own, had invited him to visit Kentucky to perform such functions as ordaining new clergy, confirming laymen, and consecrating churches.

The first rector of the parish was the Reverend Gideon McMilan. In addition to his duties as rector of Trinity Church, Reverend McMillan regularly traveled throughout the surrounding area on horseback, establishing missions in Harrodsburg and Lancaster. Reverend McMillan's service to the church was short lived, for he fell victim to the cholera epidemic of 1833, after ministering to the needs of the community. He was buried along the south wall of the church, which is now covered by the chancel.

Trinity Church continued to grow and to hold regular services. In 1860, however, the church was severely damaged in a fire which destroyed most of the Danville commercial district. The day after the fire, the building was inspected and it was determined that the four walls of the church and the vestibule which remained intact, were structurally sound. A new roof and bell tower were constructed, as well as a recessed chancel. Also at this time the original window openings were replaced by paired lancet windows with wooden tracery and a quatrefoil design centered above. The remodeled interior was plain with a balcony and organ over the entrance, and the nave was covered with simple open-timber roof. Thus, after the restoration was completed in 1861, the church which had been constructed in a modified Federal mode, was transformed into a fine Gothic Revival structure. The church, which has remained unaltered, continues to be a good example of a Gothic Revival ecclesiastical design.

For several months in 1862 the newly restored church was used as a hospital for Union troops wounded in the Battle of Perryville, which took place on October 8, 1862. A drawing of the reception of the Union troops into Danville after the battle, which appeared in the November 8, 1862 issue of Harper's Weekly Magazine, clearly shows the outline of Trinity Church.

== Description ==
The original church structure consisted of a rectangular block with a two-story vestibule projecting forward from the central bay of the facade. The walls of the vestibule, facade, and sides were laid in Flemish bond with queen closers at the corners. Two rectangular openings, filled with clear glass and Venetian shutters, were spaced along the sides. In 1842 a cupola was added to the vestibule to house the church bell. In the interior of the church, the ceiling was supported by two rows of three Doric columns. In the rear of the church (north wall) was a gallery for the organ and choir.

In 1860, the church was gutted and the roof destroyed in a fire. After the fire it was determined that the vestibule and the four walls that remained standing were structurally sound and that it would be safe to rebuild upon them. The reconstruction plans, implemented in 1860, called for several alterations which transformed the church into a Gothic Revival structure. The chancel was recessed and three lancet windows, the central opening being taller and broader than the others, were added over the altars. Two narrow lancet windows, designed to light the choir loft, were added in the facade, as well as one in the bell tower. The original rectangular openings were replaced by paired lancets, surmounted by a quatrefoil in a circle. All the windows were filled with stained glass and decorated with wooden tracery, with stone sills below and a keystone above.

The original cupola was replaced by a bell tower and a tall octagonal steeple which is crowned with a cross. Narrow louvered lancet openings are located on the four sides at the base of the steeple. Triangular vents are placed in the middle of the tower.
