= Burgin, Kentucky =

- City
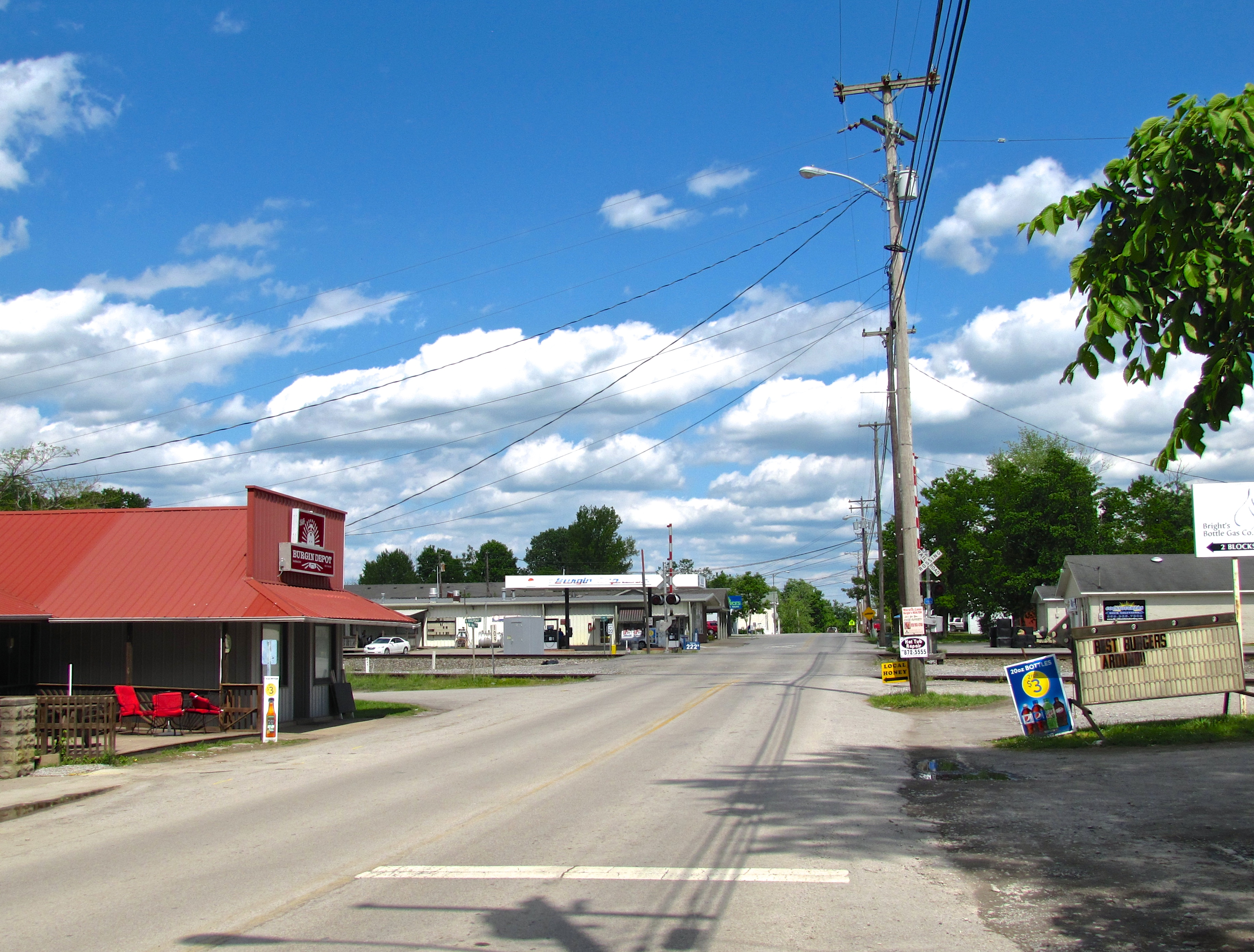
- Main Street (KY 152) in Burgin

- Location of Burgin in Mercer County, Kentucky.

- Location of Burgin, Kentucky
- Coordinates: 37°45′16″N 84°45′48″W
- Country: United States
- State: Kentucky
- County: Mercer
- Settled: 1877
- Incorporated: March 14, 1878; 148 years ago

Government
  - Mayor: Jamie Keebortz
  - City Council: Melinda Wofford; George Hensley; Sindicat Dunn; Sarah Morgan; Travis Irvin

Area
  - Total: 1.27 sq mi (3.28 km^{2})
  - Land: 1.25 sq mi (3.25 km^{2})
  - Water: 0.0077 sq mi (0.02 km^{2})
- Elevation: 863 ft (263 m)

Population (2020)
  - Total: 979
  - Density: 779.4/sq mi (300.94/km^{2})
- Time zone: UTC-5 (Eastern (EST))
  - Summer (DST): UTC-4 (EDT)
- ZIP code: 40310
- Area code: 859
- FIPS code: 21-11044
- GNIS feature ID: 2403954
- Website: https://cityofburgin.com/

Burgin is a home rule-class city in Mercer County, Kentucky, in the United States. Its population was 979 at the 2020 census.

== History ==
What is now Burgin was originally known as "Cane Run." In 1874, the Cincinnati Southern Railway obtained a right-of-way from local landowner Temple Burgin and opened Burgin Station. The town was established in 1877 and incorporated in 1878. The post office opened as "Bergen" in 1877 and changed its name to "Burgin" in 1886.

== Geography ==
The city is concentrated along Kentucky Route 152 (Main Street), with most of its public buildings lying just west of the highway's intersection with Kentucky Route 33 (Danville Street/Pleasant Hill Drive). Harrodsburg lies to the west of Burgin along KY 152, and Danville lies to the south along KY 33. Burgin is located at the headwaters of Cane Run, which flows eastward into the Dix River.

According to the United States Census Bureau, the city has a total area of 1.2 square miles (3.1 km^{2}), all land.

== Climate ==
The climate in this area is characterized by hot, humid summers and generally mild to cool winters. According to the Köppen Climate Classification system, Burgin has a humid subtropical climate, abbreviated "Cfa" on climate maps.

== Demographics ==
Historical population
Census	Pop.	Note	%±
1880	150		—
1890	303		102.0%
1900	703		132.0%
1910	679		−3.4%
1920	713		5.0%
1930	791		10.9%
1940	703		−11.1%
1950	777		10.5%
1960	879		13.1%
1970	1,002		14.0%
1980	1,008		0.6%
1990	1,009		0.1%
2000	874		−13.4%
2010	965		10.4%
2020	979		1.5%
U.S. Decennial Census

As of the census of 2000, there were 874 people, 372 households, and 258 families residing in the city. The population density was 750.8 per square mile (289.9/km^{2}). There were 407 housing units at an average density of 349.6 per square mile (135.0/km^{2}). The racial makeup of the city was 93.02% White, 3.89% African American, 0.34% Native American, 0.11% Pacific Islander, 0.69% from other races, and 1.95% from two or more races. Hispanic or Latino of any race were 0.69% of the population.

There were 372 households, out of which 29.8% had children under the age of 18 living with them, 55.6% were married couples living together, 9.9% had a female householder with no husband present, and 30.6% were non-families. 28.2% of all households were made up of individuals, and 14.5% had someone living alone who was 65 years of age or older. The average household size was 2.35 and the average family size was 2.87.

22.9% of the population was under the age of 18, 7.6% from 18 to 24, 28.0% from 25 to 44, 21.7% from 45 to 64, and 19.8% who were 65 years of age or older. The median age was 39 years. For every 100 females, there were 93.8 males. For every 100 females age 18 and over, there were 87.2 males.

The median income for a household in the city was US $34,135, and the median income for a family was $41,442. Males had a median income of $31,324 versus $21,400 for females. The per capita income for the city was $16,756. About 9.8% of families and 11.8% of the population were below the poverty line, including 13.4% of those under age 18 and 13.8% of those age 65 or over.

== Education ==
Burgin is served by Burgin Independent Schools.

== Notable natives ==
- Dillon Carmichael — singer
- Jack Coleman — basketball player
- Jacqueline Coleman — politician
- Marie McDonald — actress
