= Boyle County, Kentucky =

County in Kentucky, United States

- County
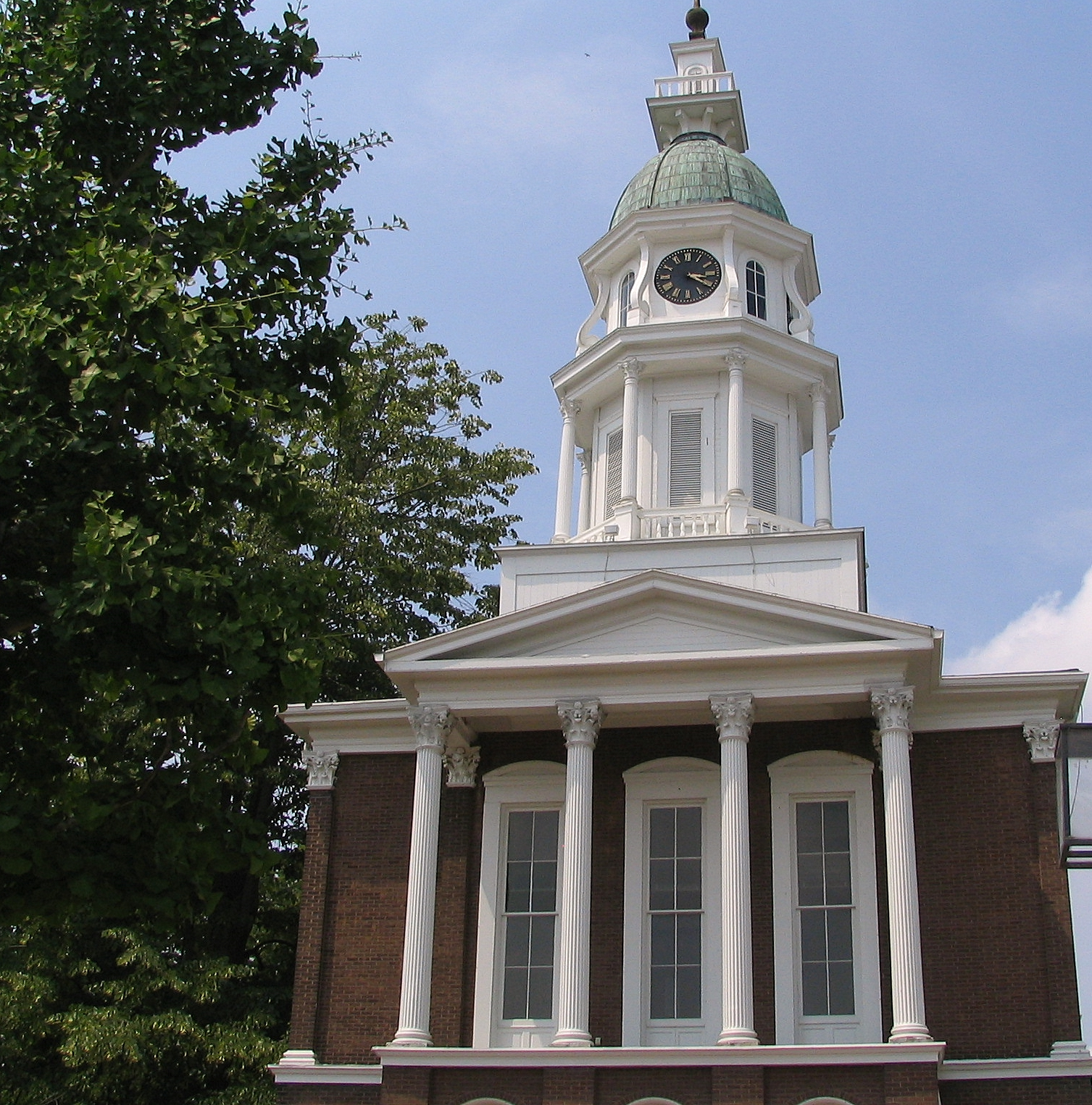
- Boyle County Courthouse in Danville

- Flag Seal

- Location within the U.S. state of Kentucky
- Coordinates: 37°37′N 84°52′W
- Country: United States
- State: Kentucky
- Founded: 1842
- Named for: John Boyle
- Seat: Danville
- Largest city: Danville

Government
  - Judge/Executive: Trille Bottom (D)

Area
  - Total: 183 sq mi (470 km^{2})
  - Land: 180 sq mi (470 km^{2})
  - Water: 2.5 sq mi (6.5 km^{2}) 1.4%

Population (2020)
  - Total: 30,614
  - Estimate (2025): 31,632 ▲
  - Density: 158/sq mi (61/km^{2})
- Time zone: UTC−5 (Eastern)
  - Summer (DST): UTC−4 (EDT)
- Congressional district: 1st
- Website: www.boylecountyky.gov

Boyle County is a county located in the central part of Kentucky. As of the 2020 census, the population was 30,614. Its county seat is Danville. The county was formed in 1842 and named for John Boyle (1774–1835), a U.S. Representative, chief justice of the Kentucky Court of Appeals, and later federal judge for the District of Kentucky, and is part of the Danville, KY Micropolitan Statistical Area.

== History ==
In 1820, a portion of Casey County, now south of KY Route 300, was annexed to Mercer County. This became part of Boyle County when Boyle County was formed on February 15, 1842, from sections of Lincoln County and Mercer County. It is named for John Boyle, Congressman, Chief Justice of the Kentucky Court of Appeals, and U.S. District Judge.

Associate Justice of the Supreme Court of the United States John Marshall Harlan, a supporter of civil rights and the sole dissenter in the Civil Rights Cases and Plessy v. Ferguson, was born in Boyle County in 1833.

A courthouse fire in 1860 resulted in the loss of some county records.

During the American Civil War, the Battle of Perryville took place here on October 8, 1862, fought between the Confederate Army of Mississippi and the Union Army of the Ohio. 7407 men fell in the battle.

== Geography ==
According to the United States Census Bureau, the county has a total area of 183 square miles (470 km^{2}), of which 180 square miles (470 km^{2}) is land and 2.5 square miles (6.5 km^{2}) (1.4%) is water.

=== Adjacent counties ===
- Mercer County (north)
- Garrard County (east)
- Lincoln County (southeast)
- Casey County (south)
- Marion County (southwest)
- Washington County (northwest)

=== Major highways ===
- U.S. Route 68
- U.S. Route 127
- U.S. Route 150
- Kentucky Route 33
- Kentucky Route 34
- Kentucky Route 37
- Kentucky Route 52
- Kentucky Route 300

== Demographics ==
Historical population
Census	Pop.	Note	%±
1850	9,116		—
1860	9,304		2.1%
1870	9,515		2.3%
1880	11,930		25.4%
1890	12,948		8.5%
1900	13,817		6.7%
1910	14,668		6.2%
1920	14,998		2.2%
1930	16,282		8.6%
1940	17,075		4.9%
1950	20,532		20.2%
1960	21,257		3.5%
1970	21,090		−0.8%
1980	25,066		18.9%
1990	25,641		2.3%
2000	27,697		8.0%
2010	28,432		2.7%
2020	30,614		7.7%
2025 (est.)	31,632	▲	3.3%
U.S. Decennial Census; 1790-1960 1900-1990; 1990-2000 2010-2020

=== 2020 census ===
As of the 2020 census, the county had a population of 30,614. The median age was 40.7 years. 20.5% of residents were under the age of 18 and 19.4% of residents were 65 years of age or older. For every 100 females there were 99.2 males, and for every 100 females age 18 and over there were 97.8 males age 18 and over.

The racial makeup of the county was 82.9% White, 7.2% Black or African American, 0.2% American Indian and Alaska Native, 1.2% Asian, 0.0% Native Hawaiian and Pacific Islander, 2.0% from some other race, and 6.6% from two or more races. Hispanic or Latino residents of any race comprised 4.9% of the population.

64.6% of residents lived in urban areas, while 35.4% lived in rural areas.

There were 11,746 households in the county, of which 28.9% had children under the age of 18 living with them and 30.6% had a female householder with no spouse or partner present. About 30.2% of all households were made up of individuals and 14.1% had someone living alone who was 65 years of age or older.

There were 12,929 housing units, of which 9.1% were vacant. Among occupied housing units, 64.7% were owner-occupied and 35.3% were renter-occupied. The homeowner vacancy rate was 2.0% and the rental vacancy rate was 8.5%.

=== 2000 census ===
As of the census of 2000, there were 27,697 people, 10,574 households, and 7,348 families residing in the county. The population density was 152 per square mile (59/km^{2}). There were 11,418 housing units at an average density of 63 per square mile (24/km^{2}). The racial makeup of the county was 87.77% White, 9.68% Black or African American, 0.19% Native American, 0.56% Asian, 0.03% Pacific Islander, 0.65% from other races, and 1.12% from two or more races. Hispanic or Latino of any race were 1.44% of the population.

There were 10,574 households, of which 31.00% had children under the age of 18 living with them, 53.70% were married couples living together, 12.50% had a female householder with no husband present, and 30.50% were non-families. 27.10% of all households were made up of individuals, and 12.10% had someone living alone who was 65 years of age or older. The average household size was 2.38 and the average family size was 2.87.

By age, 22.70% of the population was under 18, 11.00% from 18 to 24, 28.60% from 25 to 44, 23.70% from 45 to 64, and 14.10% were 65 or older. The median age was 37 years. For every 100 females, there were 98.30 males. For every 100 females age 18 and over, there were 96.00 males.

The median income for a household in the county was US $35,241, and the median income for a family was $42,699. Males had a median income of $33,411 versus $23,635 for females. The per capita income for the county was $18,288. About 9.10% of families and 11.90% of the population were below the poverty line, including 15.80% of those under age 18 and 12.10% of those age 65 or over.

== Politics ==
United States presidential election results for Boyle County, Kentucky
Year	Republican		Democratic		Third party(ies)	
Year	No.	%	No.	%	No.	%
1912	701	21.59%	1,798	55.37%	748	23.04%
1916	1,494	41.83%	2,052	57.45%	26	0.73%
1920	3,205	43.65%	4,099	55.83%	38	0.52%
1924	2,673	43.00%	3,197	51.42%	347	5.58%
1928	3,517	54.01%	2,992	45.95%	3	0.05%
1932	2,208	32.90%	4,473	66.65%	30	0.45%
1936	2,431	36.80%	4,148	62.79%	27	0.41%
1940	2,257	35.55%	4,081	64.28%	11	0.17%
1944	2,195	38.38%	3,490	61.02%	34	0.59%
1948	1,897	34.89%	3,338	61.39%	202	3.72%
1952	2,969	43.90%	3,771	55.76%	23	0.34%
1956	3,427	49.81%	3,436	49.94%	17	0.25%
1960	3,624	52.28%	3,308	47.72%	0	0.00%
1964	1,972	28.33%	4,976	71.47%	14	0.20%
1968	2,715	40.29%	2,663	39.52%	1,360	20.18%
1972	4,317	63.66%	2,395	35.32%	69	1.02%
1976	3,511	45.58%	4,095	53.16%	97	1.26%
1980	3,848	44.88%	4,429	51.66%	297	3.46%
1984	5,675	62.53%	3,378	37.22%	23	0.25%
1988	4,746	56.81%	3,575	42.79%	33	0.40%
1992	4,019	43.32%	3,894	41.97%	1,365	14.71%
1996	4,157	47.34%	3,877	44.15%	748	8.52%
2000	6,126	59.33%	3,963	38.38%	237	2.30%
2004	7,764	62.16%	4,646	37.20%	80	0.64%
2008	7,701	60.95%	4,769	37.74%	165	1.31%
2012	7,703	62.26%	4,471	36.14%	199	1.61%
2016	8,040	62.10%	4,281	33.07%	625	4.83%
2020	8,872	61.28%	5,298	36.59%	308	2.13%
2024	9,159	63.72%	4,990	34.72%	224	1.56%

The county voted "No" on 2022 Kentucky Amendment 2, an anti-abortion ballot measure, by 53% to 47% despite backing Donald Trump with 61% of the vote to Joe Biden's 37% in the 2020 presidential election.

=== Elected officials ===
==== State and Federal ====
Elected officials as of January 3, 2025
U.S. House	James Comer (R)	KY 1
Ky. Senate	Amanda Mays Bledsoe (R)	12
Ky. House	Daniel Elliott (R)	54

==== County ====
Elected officials as of January 2, 2023
Judge/Executive	Trille L. Bottom (D)
Magistrate District 1	Tom V. Ellis (R)
Magistrate District 2	Paula Bodner (R)
Magistrate District 3	Barry Harmon (R)
Magistrate District 4	Jason M. Cullen (R)
Magistrate District 5	Jamey Gay (D)
Magistrate District 6	Steve Sleeper (R)
Clerk	Casey McCoy (R)
Attorney	Christopher K. Herron (R)
Jailer	Brian Wofford (R)
Coroner	Eric Guerrant (R)
Surveyor	Richard Patrick Murphy
Property Value Admin.	Lacresha My Gibson (D)
Sheriff	Taylor Bottom (R)

==== Judicial ====
Elected officials as of March 4, 2025
Commonwealth's Attorney	Justin Johnson (R)
Circuit Court Clerk	Cortney Shewmaker (D)
20th Circuit, 1st division	Whitney Z. Johns (Note: Appointed by governor Andy Beshear to fill a vacancy.)
20th Circuit, 2nd division family court	Bruce Petrie
20th District	Patrick F. Barsotti

== Education ==
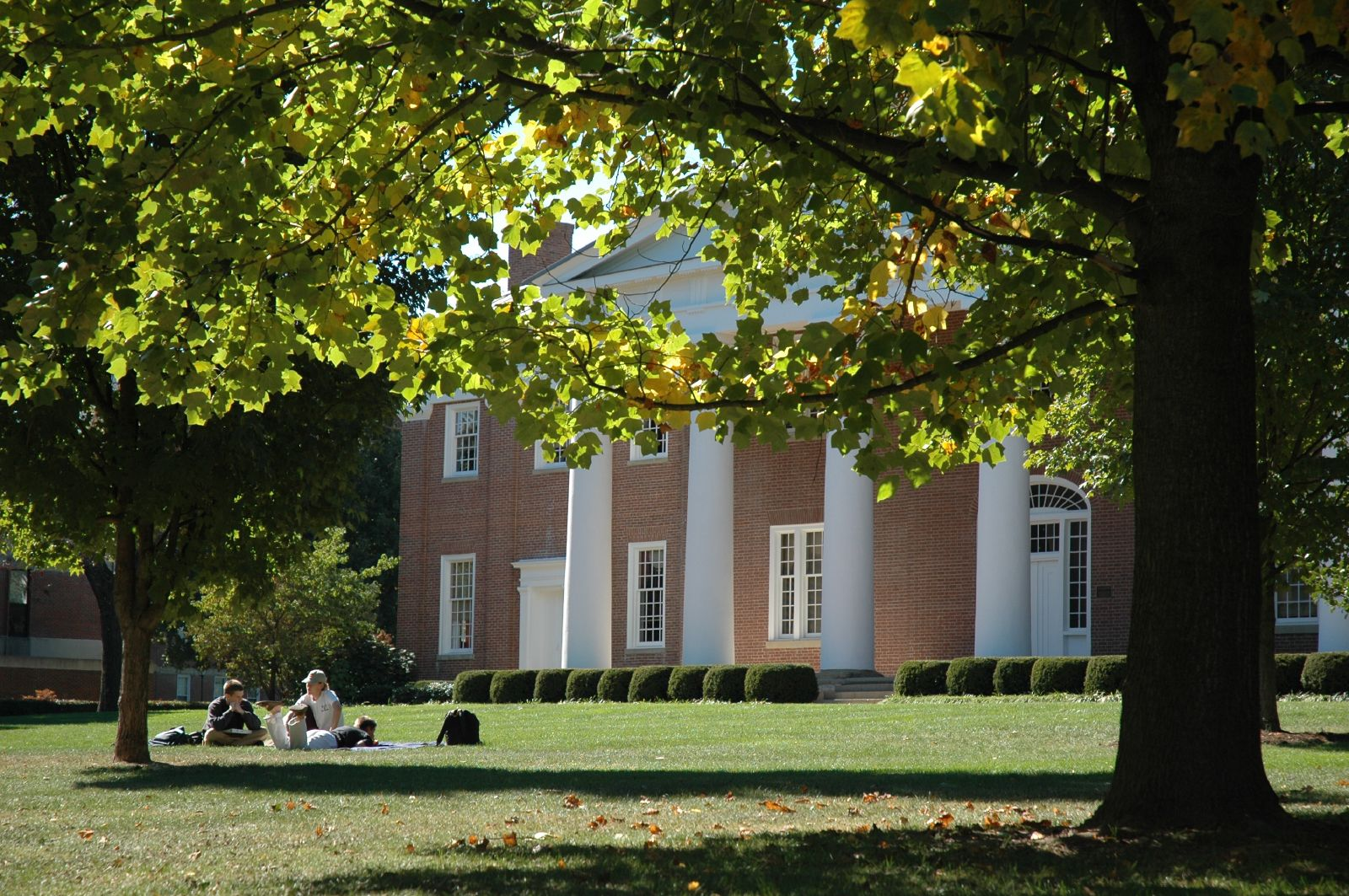
Centre College

=== Public schools ===
There are two school districts in the county.

Boyle County Schools is the school district that serves all of Boyle County except Danville with three elementary schools, one middle school, and one high school. Danville Schools is the school district that serves the city of Danville with three elementary schools, one middle school, and one high school.

Kentucky School for the Deaf, a state-operated school, provides education to Kentucky's deaf and hard-of-hearing children from elementary through high school

=== Private schools ===
Two private schools operate in Boyle County: Danville Christian Academy and Danville Montessori School.

=== Colleges and universities ===
Centre College, a nationally recognized liberal arts college, is located in Danville. Six other colleges and universities have (or had) campuses in Boyle County:

- American National University, Danville campus closed
- Bluegrass Community and Technical College
- Eastern Kentucky University, Danville campus closed in May 2018
- Midway University, Danville campus closed
- Kentucky College for Women, merged with Centre College in 1930.
- Transylvania University, moved to Lexington Kentucky in 1789.

== Communities ==
=== Cities ===
- Danville (county seat)
- Junction City (a small portion extends into Lincoln County)
- Perryville

=== Unincorporated places ===
- Aliceton
- Alum Springs
- Atoka
- Brumfield
- Clifton
- Forkland
- Little Needmore
- Mitchellsburg
- Needmore
- Parksville
- Wilsonville

== See also ==
- Northpoint Training Center - a medium security Kentucky Department of Corrections facility located in Boyle County.
- National Register of Historic Places listings in Boyle County, Kentucky
