= Gravel Switch, Kentucky =

Unincorporated community in Kentucky, United States

- Unincorporated community
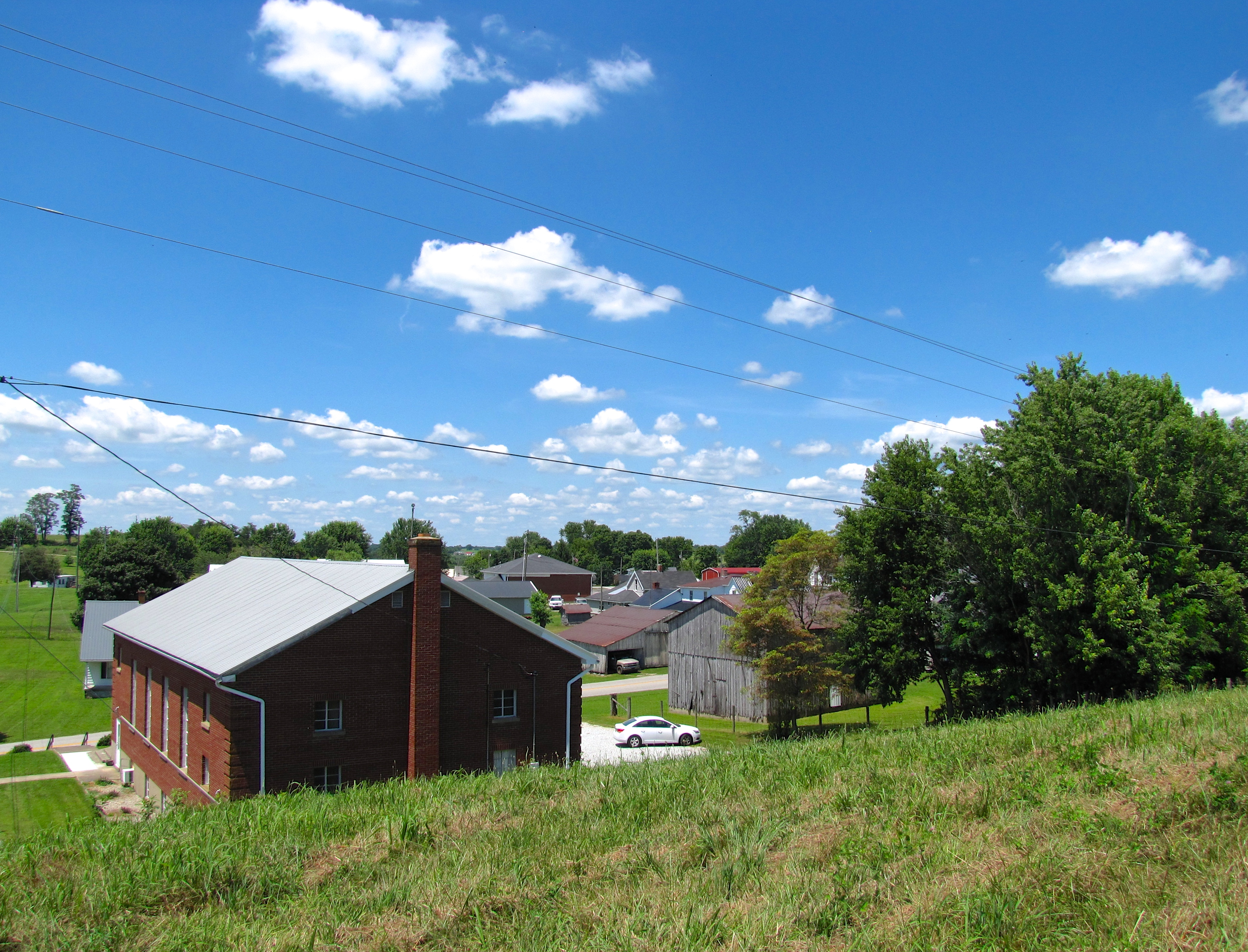
- Gravel Switch

- Location within Kentucky Location within the United States
- Coordinates: 37°34′43″N 85°3′7″W
- Country: United States
- State: Kentucky
- County: Marion
- Elevation: 909 ft (277 m)
- Time zone: UTC-5 (Eastern (EST))
  - Summer (DST): UTC-4 (EDT)
- ZIP codes: 40328
- GNIS feature ID: 493182

Gravel Switch is an unincorporated community within Marion County, Kentucky, United States. It is located along Kentucky Route 243, just south of its intersection with U.S. Route 68, southwest of Perryville and northeast of Bradfordsville.

A post office was established in the community in 1870, and it was named for a valuable gravel deposit to which the local railroad directed a railway track, on the Louisville and Nashville Railroad Lebanon Branch

The community is near Penn's Store, the oldest general store in Kentucky, geographically located in nearby Boyle County.
