= National Register of Historic Places listings in Clark County, Kentucky =

Location of Clark County in Kentucky

This is a list of the National Register of Historic Places listings in Clark County, Kentucky.

This is intended to be a complete list of the properties and districts on the National Register of Historic Places in Clark County, Kentucky, United States. The locations of National Register properties and districts for which the latitude and longitude coordinates are included below, may be seen in a map.

There are 68 properties and districts listed on the National Register in the county.

This National Park Service list is complete through NPS recent listings posted May 1, 2026.

== Current listings ==
	Name on the Register	Image	Date listed	Location	City or town	Description
1	Antioch Christian Church		August 1, 1979 (#79003566)	Off Muddy Creek Rd. at Four Mile Creek and Stone Branch; 37°54′28″N 84°10′06″W	Winchester	
2	Boone Creek Rural Historic District		August 19, 1994 (#94000839)	Roughly bounded by Interstate 75, Cleveland Rd., Athens-Boonesboro Rd. and Grimes Rd. 37°55′02″N 84°19′36″W	Lexington	Extends into Fayette County
3	Boot Hill Farm	Boot Hill Farm	March 1, 1985 (#85000374)	Athens-Boonesboro Pike (KY 418); 37°55′53″N 84°20′22″W	Athens	
4	Brock House		August 1, 1979 (#79003567)	Off Red River Rd. 37°52′09″N 84°06′11″W	Bloomingdale	
5	Brown-Proctoria Hotel	Brown-Proctoria Hotel	July 29, 1977 (#77000609)	Main St. and Lexington Ave. 37°59′28″N 84°10′42″W	Winchester	
6	Capt. Robert V. Bush House	Capt. Robert V. Bush House	August 1, 1979 (#79003568)	Combs Ferry Rd. 37°58′05″N 84°17′22″W	Becknerville	
7	V.W. Bush Warehouse		March 13, 2017 (#100000737)	127 N. Main St. 37°59′47″N 84°10′32″W	Winchester	No longer extant.
8	W. Bush-Dykes House	W. Bush-Dykes House	August 1, 1979 (#79003569)	U.S. Route 227; 37°55′02″N 84°15′26″W	Forest Grove	
9	Bybee House	Bybee House	August 1, 1979 (#79003570)	Bybee Rd. 37°54′55″N 84°11′05″W	Winchester	
10	Henry W. Calmes House		August 1, 1979 (#79003571)	U.S. Route 227; 37°58′45″N 84°18′51″W	Winchester	
11	Tarleton Chiles House	Tarleton Chiles House	August 1, 1979 (#79003598)	Jones Nursery Rd. 37°57′33″N 84°17′18″W	Becknerville	
12	Civil War Fort at Boonesboro		June 18, 2003 (#03000262)	0.6 miles north of Ford, west of Fort Hampton Rd. 37°53′24″N 84°15′32″W	Ford	
13	Clark County Court House	Clark County Court House	August 7, 1974 (#74000858)	Main St. 37°59′34″N 84°10′41″W	Winchester	
14	Gov. James A. Clark Mansion	Gov. James A. Clark Mansion	June 13, 1974 (#74000859)	Burns Ave. and Belmont St. 37°59′20″N 84°11′16″W	Winchester	
15	William Clinkenbeard House	William Clinkenbeard House	November 20, 1980 (#80001497)	Old Paris Pike; 38°02′48″N 84°10′42″W	Winchester	
16	Colby Tavern	Colby Tavern	August 1, 1979 (#79003572)	Junction of Colby and Becknerville Rds. 37°59′34″N 84°15′51″W	Winchester	
17	Corinth Christian Methodist Episcopal Church	Corinth Christian Methodist Episcopal Church	July 11, 2007 (#07000678)	1180 L E Junction Rd. 37°59′54″N 84°03′30″W	Winchester	
18	Couchman House		August 1, 1979 (#79003573)	Off Old Boonesboro Rd. 37°57′20″N 84°10′26″W	Winchester	
19	Frances Cullom, Jr. House		August 1, 1979 (#79003574)	Muddy Creek Rd. 37°55′08″N 84°09′50″W	Winchester	
20	Elkin House		August 1, 1979 (#79003576)	Off U.S. Route 227; 37°56′19″N 84°13′17″W	Winchester	
21	Achilles Eubank House		August 1, 1979 (#79003577)	Elkin Rd. 37°54′25″N 84°12′37″W	Winchester	
22	Jesse Fishback House		August 1, 1979 (#79003578)	Off Combs Ferry Rd. 37°58′50″N 84°18′56″W	Becknerville	
23	John Gibbs House		August 1, 1979 (#79003580)	Fox-Quisenberry Rd. 37°56′31″N 84°04′00″W	Pilot View	
24	David Gist House		August 1, 1979 (#79003581)	Stoner Rd. 38°05′01″N 84°06′47″W	Winchester	
25	Strauder Goff House		August 1, 1979 (#79003582)	Off Van Meter Rd. 38°02′48″N 84°11′54″W	Winchester	
26	Goshen Primitive Baptist Church	Goshen Primitive Baptist Church	August 1, 1979 (#79003583)	Goshen Rd. 38°01′08″N 84°04′15″W	Winchester	
27	Nathaniel Haggard House		August 1, 1979 (#79003584)	Off New Boonesborough Rd. 37°57′35″N 84°12′18″W	Winchester	
28	Jesse Hampton House		August 1, 1979 (#79003585)	Bybee Rd. 37°55′05″N 84°11′02″W	Winchester	
29	Gen. Thomas Hart House	Gen. Thomas Hart House	August 1, 1979 (#79003586)	Ecton Rd. 38°00′11″N 84°09′14″W	Winchester	
30	William Hickman House	William Hickman House	November 24, 1982 (#82001554)	31 W. Hickman St. 37°59′28″N 84°10′48″W	Winchester	
31	Hodgkins House	Hodgkins House	August 1, 1979 (#79003587)	Old Boonesborough Rd. 37°55′52″N 84°14′07″W	Winchester	
32	Dailey-Milton Holliday House		August 1, 1979 (#79003575)	Jones Nursery Rd. 37°57′00″N 84°18′42″W	Becknerville	
33	Hollywood Springs		August 1, 1979 (#79003588)	Off Kiddville Rd. 37°56′55″N 83°59′10″W	Kiddville	
34	Hood-Tucker House	Hood-Tucker House	January 4, 2007 (#06001201)	19 French Ave. 37°59′10″N 84°10′44″W	Winchester	
35	Indian Fort Earthworks (15CK7)		November 14, 1985 (#85002823)	Address Restricted	Goffs Corner	
36	Lampton House		August 1, 1979 (#79003589)	Muddy Creek Rd. 37°56′57″N 84°08′49″W	Winchester	
37	Alpheus Lewis House		August 1, 1979 (#79003590)	Off Wades Mill Rd. 38°04′32″N 84°06′54″W	Winchester	
38	Jonathan Bush House		August 1, 1979 (#79003591)	On Lower Howard's Creek; 37°55′44″N 84°16′33″W	Hootentown	Originally listed as the Martin House; renamed 2016-08-09.
39	Maj. John Martin House	Maj. John Martin House	April 29, 1982 (#82002680)	Basin Springs Rd. 37°59′23″N 84°17′14″W	Pine Grove	
40	Jonathan Bush Mill		November 20, 1980 (#80001498)	Address Restricted	Winchester	Originally listed as the Martin-Holder-Bush-Hampton Mill; renamed 2016-08-09.
41	Middle Reaches of Boone Creek Rural Historic District		May 31, 1996 (#96000429)	Roughly bounded by U.S. Route 421, Jones Nursery, Coombs Ferry, Sulpher Well Rds., and U.S. Route 25; 37°57′34″N 84°19′17″W	Lexington	Extends into Fayette County
42	Mound Hill Archeological Site	Mound Hill Archeological Site	August 25, 1978 (#78001308)	0.5 miles (0.80 km) west of the Devil's Backbone above Stoner Creek; 38°05′49″N 84°08′01″W	Winchester	
43	Oliver School	Oliver School	August 4, 2004 (#04000795)	30 Oliver St. 37°59′44″N 84°10′47″W	Winchester	
44	Owen-Gay Farm	Owen-Gay Farm	March 13, 1997 (#97000163)	Gay Rd., junction with Donaldson Rd. at the Bourbon County line 38°06′24″N 84°06′56″W	Winchester	Extends into Bourbon County
45	Parrish Place		August 1, 1979 (#79003592)	Todd-Colby Rd. 37°59′31″N 84°19′14″W	Pine Grove	
46	Col. Edmund Pendleton House		August 1, 1979 (#79003593)	Van Meter Rd. 38°03′24″N 84°15′09″W	Clintonville	
47	Maj. Walter Preston House	Maj. Walter Preston House	August 1, 1979 (#79003594)	Basin Springs Rd. 37°58′45″N 84°17′19″W	Becknerville	
48	Providence Baptist Church	Providence Baptist Church	May 13, 1976 (#76000864)	6 miles southwest of Winchester off KY 627; 37°56′15″N 84°14′45″W	Winchester	
49	W. Pruett House	W. Pruett House	November 20, 1980 (#80001499)	Ecton Rd. 38°00′40″N 84°02′50″W	Winchester	
50	J. Quisenberry House	J. Quisenberry House	August 1, 1979 (#79003596)	Quisenberry Rd. 37°55′43″N 84°15′04″W	Forest Grove	
51	Joel Quisenberry House		August 1, 1979 (#79003595)	Flanagan Station Rd. 37°56′06″N 84°12′57″W	Winchester	
52	Redmond House		August 1, 1979 (#79003597)	Off U.S. Route 60; 38°01′31″N 84°03′42″W	Winchester	
53	Robert Scobee House		November 20, 1980 (#80001500)	Off U.S. Route 60; 38°03′16″N 84°05′28″W	Winchester	
54	South Park Neighborhood	South Park Neighborhood	June 18, 2008 (#07001253)	Roughly bounded by Hickman St., an alley east of Kentucky St., the rear of properties facing Highland St., and French Ave. 37°59′16″N 84°10′56″W	Winchester	
55	Springhill	Springhill	February 17, 1978 (#78001309)	North of Winchester on Colby Rd. 38°00′30″N 84°17′11″W	Winchester	
56	Stipp House		November 20, 1980 (#80001501)	Van Meter Rd. 38°03′41″N 84°14′58″W	Winchester	
57	F. Taylor Mill		November 20, 1980 (#80001502)	Address Restricted	Winchester	
58	William Taylor House		August 1, 1979 (#79003600)	Lower Howard's Creek; 37°56′16″N 84°15′52″W	Becknerville	
59	Stanley F. Tebbs House	Stanley F. Tebbs House	August 1, 1979 (#79003579)	Todd's Rd. 38°00′02″N 84°17′04″W	Pine Grove	
60	Thomson Neighborhood District	Thomson Neighborhood District	January 17, 1992 (#91001925)	Roughly bounded by S. Main St., Moundale Ave., Boone Ave., S. Maple St. and W. Hickman St. 37°59′16″N 84°10′56″W	Winchester	
61	Upper Reaches of Boone Creek Rural Historic District	Upper Reaches of Boone Creek Rural Historic District	November 27, 2009 (#09000569)	Upper Boone Creek vicinity 38°00′14″N 84°18′14″W	Winchester	
62	Van Meter Distillery	Van Meter Distillery	August 1, 1979 (#79003599)	Van Meter Rd. 38°02′16″N 84°12′52″W	Winchester	
63	Victory Heights Elementary School	Victory Heights Elementary School	August 4, 2004 (#04000796)	160 Maryland Ave. 38°00′05″N 84°11′39″W	Winchester	
64	Vinewood	Vinewood	August 12, 1977 (#77000610)	4 miles northeast of Winchester on U.S. Route 60; 38°02′07″N 84°07′35″W	Winchester	
65	Wade Farmstead	Wade Farmstead	August 1, 1979 (#79003601)	Donaldson Rd. 38°06′26″N 84°05′07″W	Winchester	
66	Winchester Downtown Commercial District	Winchester Downtown Commercial District	April 28, 1982 (#82002681)	Roughly bounded by railroad tracks, KY 627, and Maple and Highland Sts. 37°59′34″N 84°10′38″W	Winchester	Includes the Kerr Building.
67	Woodford-Fishback-Venable Farm	Woodford-Fishback-Venable Farm	July 8, 2008 (#08000655)	5696 Combs Ferry Rd. 37°56′21″N 84°17′05″W	Winchester	
68	Wright-Evans House		March 5, 2019 (#100003474)	3800 Pretty Run Rd. 38°05′41″N 84°08′05″W	Winchester vicinity	

== See also ==
- List of National Historic Landmarks in Kentucky
- National Register of Historic Places listings in Kentucky
