= Antioch Christian Church =

Antioch Christian Church may refer to:

- Antioch International Movement of Churches
- Antioch Christian Church (Winchester, Kentucky), see National Register of Historic Places listings in Clark County, Kentucky
- Antioch Christian Church (Kansas City, Missouri), see National Register of Historic Places listings in Missouri, Counties C
- Antioch Christian Church (Allendale, South Carolina), see National Register of Historic Places listings in South Carolina
