= Helen Bickham =

Mexican artist (born 1935)

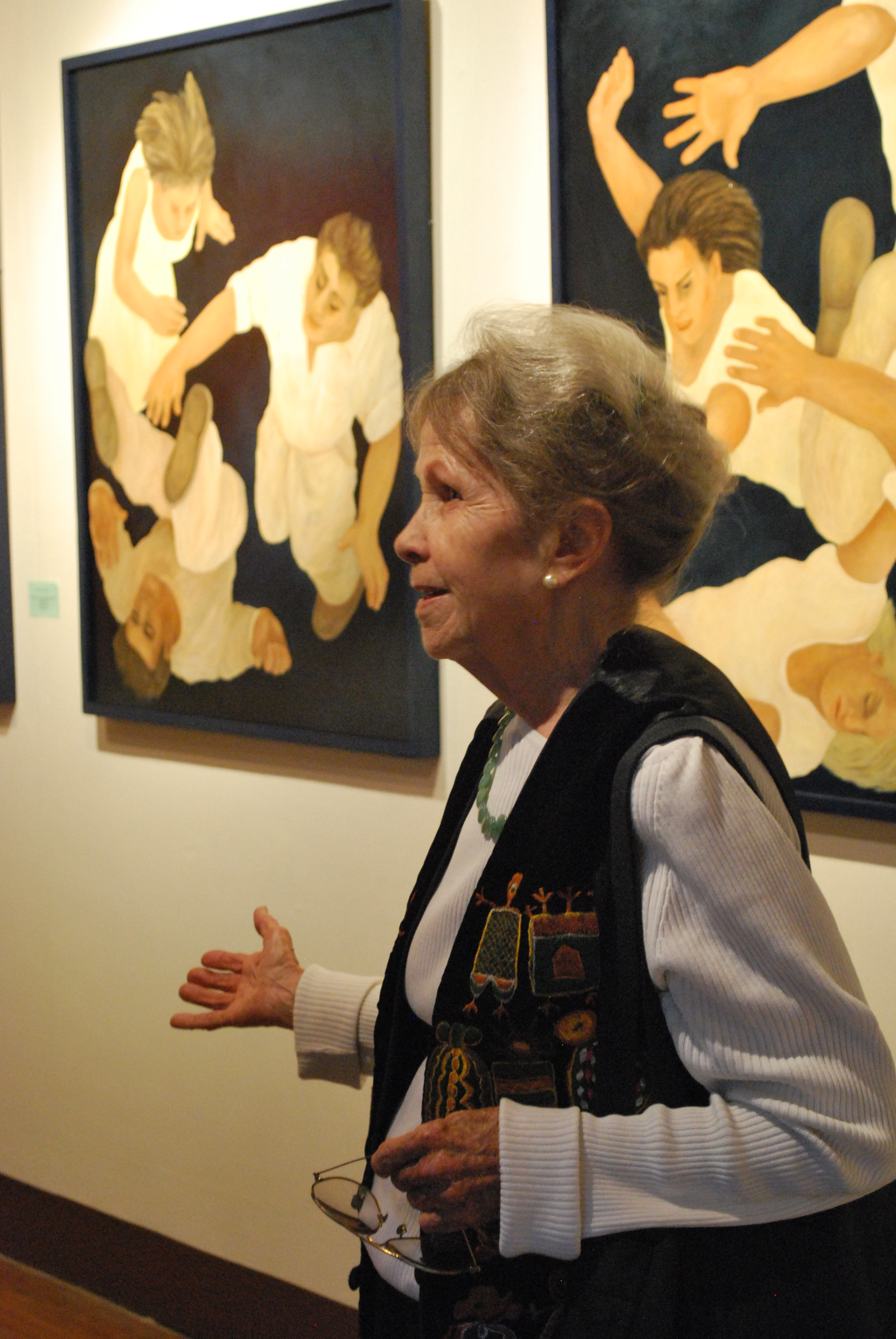
- Helen Bickham at opening in Valle de Bravo, Mexico
- Born: 9 June 1935; Harbin, Heilongjiang, China
- Died: September 30, 2024 (aged 89); Mexico City, Mexico
- Occupation: Artist

Helen Bickham (9 June 1935 – 30 September 2024) was a Mexican artist, from Eurasian with American parents who began painting professionally later in life. She was born in Harbin, moving to the United States during World War II. She lived in Europe for a while but settled in Mexico in 1962 after visiting the country. She began drawing at the age of six, drawing and painting non-professionally until 1975 when she considers her career to have begun. She has had seventy individual exhibitions, participated in over 300 collective ones and has been a member of the Salón de la Plástica Mexicana since 1997. Her work is figurative, generally one or more figures on one or more landscapes, and described as introspective, with the aim of conveying a feeling or mood rather than a person or object.

== Life ==
Interview with the artist at her home in Mexico City

Helen Bickham was born on June 9, 1935, in Harbin, Manchuria at the time of Japanese occupation. Her mother, Nadezna Ivanofnof Rachoak, was from a mixed Ukrainian/Asian family, and her maternal grandfather worked for the Trans-Siberian Railroad. Her father, Howard Montgomery, was an American officer with the U.S. Navy, who died in World War II when Bickham was only eight. Before his death, her mother and she left China for the United States, arriving just before the attack on Pearl Harbor

Bickham grew up in various parts of the United States as an only child. She and her mother had a difficult time adjusting to life in the United States. Her mother did not speak English and worked menial jobs such as sewing and housecleaning, socializing with other Euro-Asian refugees who spoke Russian. She was home alone a lot as a child, spending most of her time reading and drawing because her mother had to work.

Caught between cultures as a child, she often found herself as a lonely observer, drawing what she saw as early as age six. She remembers that as a child, the other children would often ask her to draw things for them such as a “mommy” or a “doctor.” If they did not specify, she would draw figures without clothes, like paper dolls, to add them later, but this caused one of the mothers to call her a “degenerate.” Her mother did not encourage her art; however, she did receive some support for her art at school. While she was in elementary school in Virginia, she was often excused from class to draw murals in the hall, usually with themes such as Thanksgiving, done on butcher paper.

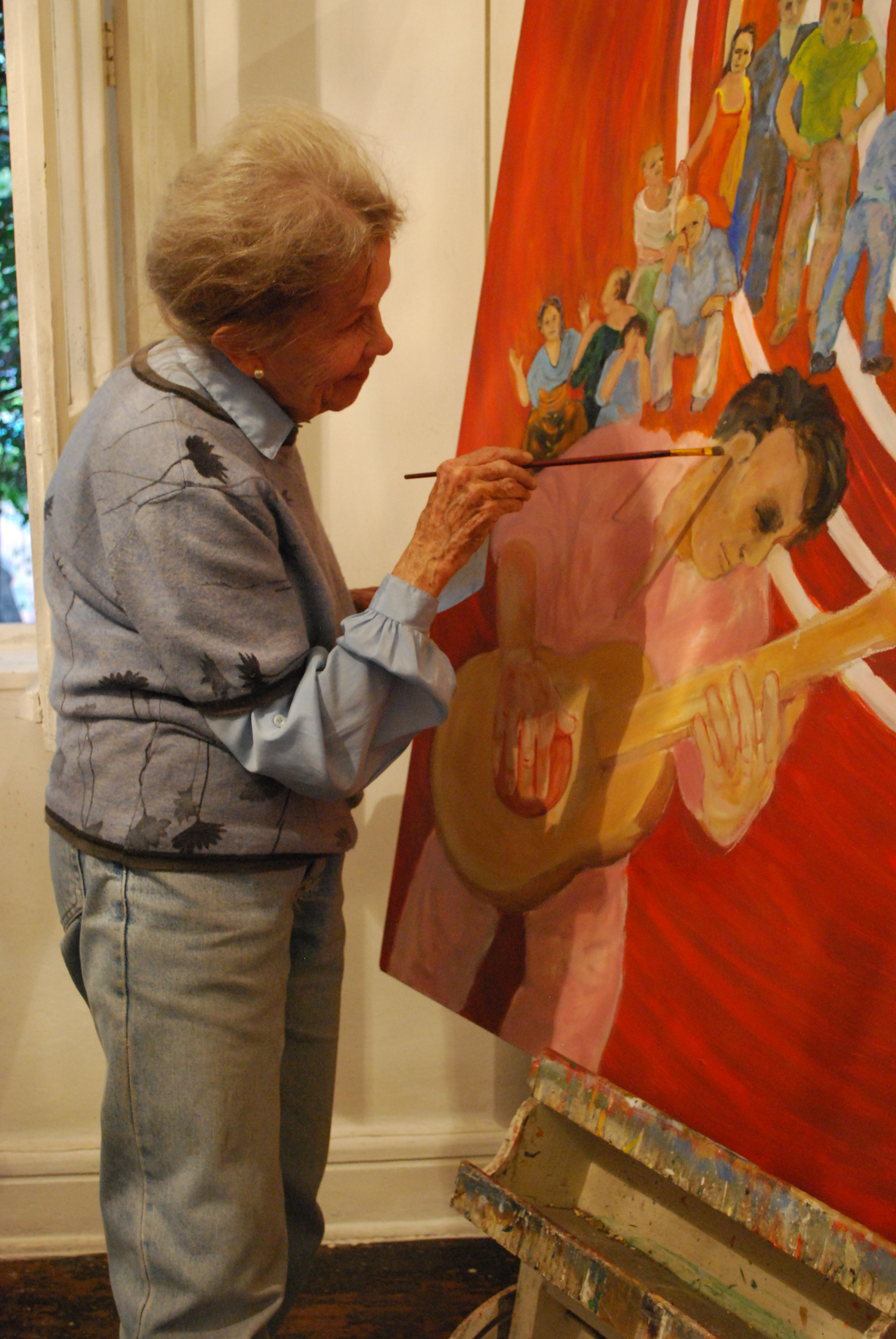
Bickham working on piece in her studio

She was also an inquisitive child and young adult often not satisfied with the answers provided by her family and religion. Although neither her mother nor her stepfather thought that university was appropriate for girls, she managed to go to the University of California, Berkeley on scholarship. There, she took classes simply because someone stated that they were the hardest, with classes in every discipline, as the university system allowed students to design their own majors. She decided on American civilization as she was an immigrant and wanted to understand the ideas of Europe brought over to the continent by the original settlers. She did not major in art, but she took an art appreciation class. This class had an assignment of creating a watercolor, and Bickham's desire to get the image just right caused the professor to comment that she was an artist. She was also required to visit a museum in San Francisco, a task she started grudgingly. However, after she saw her first real Édouard Manet painting, instead of a reproduction, she stood transfixed and returned home happy to show her ticket stub to her professor. She married in the late fifties and had her first son, Geoffrey just before the family left for Europe.

When she lived in Florence, Italy, she had a landlady was a painter. She also had a chance to see many famous art pieces in their original spending much of her time in Europe in the museums of Italy, France, Germany, the Netherlands and Belgium. She returned to the United States, where her second son, Brett, was born. She lived outside of Indianapolis, painting landscapes and still lifes.(revelation) At this time she met painter Bill Majors. He saw Bickham's watercolors saying she painted them as if they were oils and bought her a set of oil paints. In 1962, she went to Mexico for a six-week vacation. While she was gone, one of her friends in Indiana took three paintings from her home to enter in an art competition for her. These three were chosen to compete as part of a group of 600 from 6,000 and all three won prizes.

In Mexico, she says she fell in love with the country instantly and decided to stay permanently, wanting to provide a bicultural experience for her sons. Except for stays in the United States and Europe she has called Mexico home since. When she decided to live in Mexico, she was a single parent with one child who was ill and needed full-time care. She was not a privileged foreigner, but rather worked giving in English classes. She initially lived in a small town called San Lorenzo Acopilco located just west of Mexico City proper. It was difficult as the area was poor but she needed the peace and quiet it provided. She then moved to Mexico City because of the medical care that one of her sons needed. She became an English teacher in schools such as Garside and the Instituto Politecnico Nacional in Zacatenco. During these years, she never stopped painting but her focuses shifted from landscapes to people as she was impressed with the people she met in the country.

For much of her life, she never considered becoming a professional painter. It was a hobby and a passion, a way of expressing her inner feelings. From 1962 to 1975 she was busy teaching English and raising her children. However, because she was on a tight budget, she went to exhibition openings in her free time, meeting many artists, who after seeing her so many times, began to invite her to their homes. She quit teaching English at the Instituto Politécnico Nacional when she asked for leave to take her children to Europe for a year and they denied it. In England she represented Mexico, presenting a latter from noted curator Fernando Gamboa to the cultural attache at the Mexican embassy there. She was then officially invited to exhibit in the country as a Mexican artist. She continued to exhibit with success and since returning to Mexico, she has been a full-time painter.

Today, Bickham lives in the Colonia Roma neighborhood in Mexico City. Her apartment has large windows which face the Plaza de las Cibeles with its fountain and provides natural light. Her paintings cover most of the walls, with the exception of the bedroom because she found herself at night taking them down to retouch them. She paints every morning after she wakes up either next to a window in her apartment or up on the building's roof, often with coffee in hand. Physically, she has a fragile appearance but her eyes have been described as “laughing” and she often gets around Mexico City by bicycle. She says she has two great loves, people and nature. People and places that strike her can remain in her memory for years. She has traveled much of the world and believes that there are universal emotions that make us human. And also believes that a multiethnic, multicultural world where people live in peace is possible. She remains very attached to Mexico, saying that its people have a “real humanity” about them, capable of smiling and being polite even in trying economic circumstances. This has been an influence in her art, even an entire exhibition at UNAM called México a través del pincel de Helen Bickham” (Mexico through the brush of Helen Bickham) to demonstrate her impressions of Mexico.

Bickham died on 30 September 2024, at the age of 89.

== Career ==
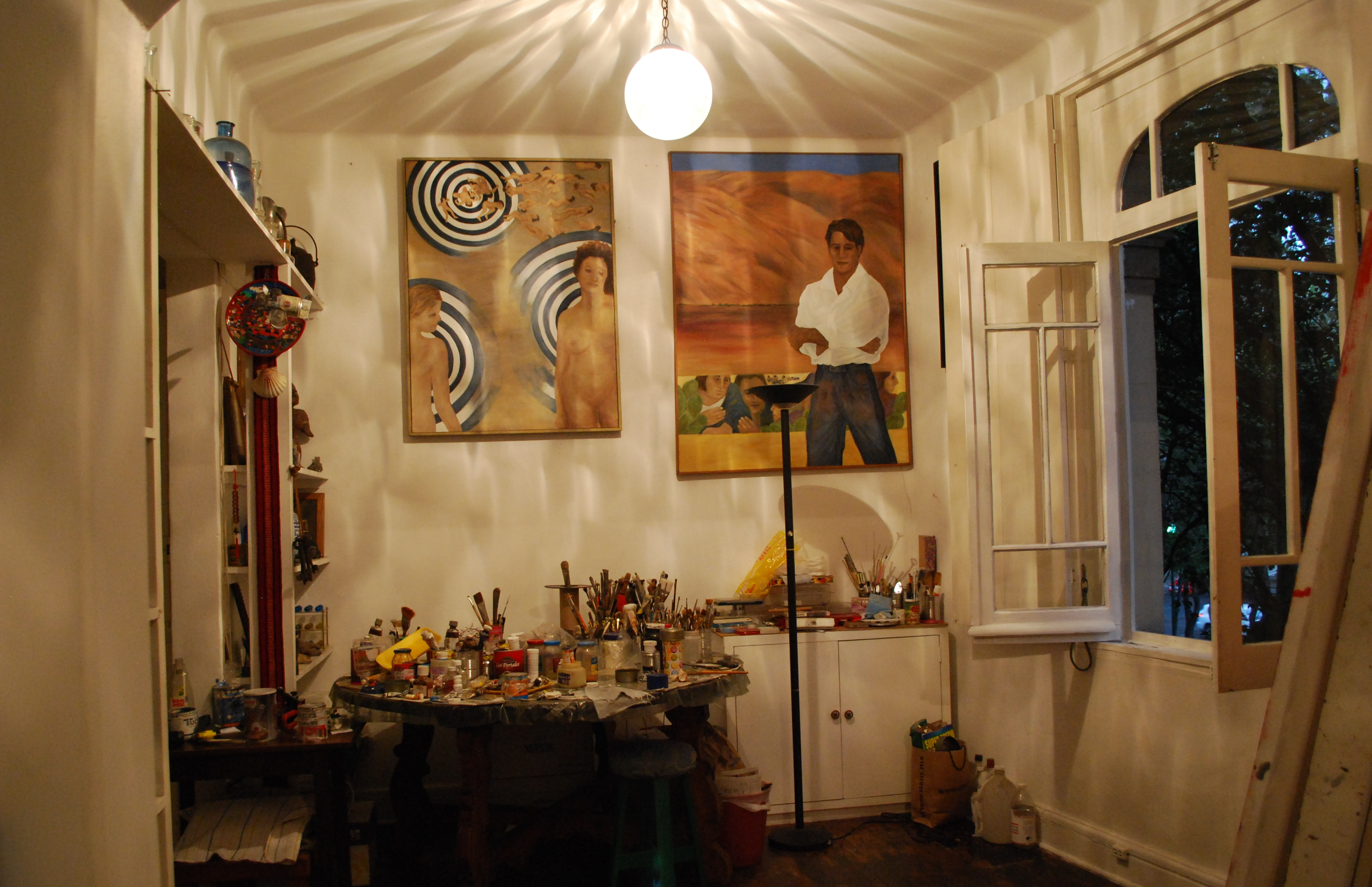
View of studio/apt in Colonia Roma

Her first exhibition of her work was in 1963, but she considered her career to have begun in 1975 when she began painting full-time. Since then she has had seventy individual exhibitions and participated in over 300 collective ones, in Mexican cities such as Mexico City, Monterrey, Acapulco and Puerto Vallarta as well as in the United States, England, Scotland, Switzerland, Argentina, and Canada.

Some of her more notable exhibitions have included those at the Arts Association of the State of Indiana (1963), Galería May Brooks in Mexico City (1965), Foreign Friends in Acapulco (1970), Thomoas V. Robinson Galleries in Houston TX (1978) Pacific Design Center in Los Angeles (1980), Hotel Ritz-Carlton, Boston (1982), Howard Coron Collection in New York (1985), Zum Blauen Gallery in Winterthur, Switzerland (1989) and the Galería de Arte Misrachi in Mexico City (1995), Universidad Autónoma Metropolitana Casa de la Primera Impresora in Mexico City (1996), Museo de la Ciudad de Querétaro in Querétaro (2003), Museo Ex Convento del Carmen in Guadalajara (2006), Galería Hecaro in Mexico City (2007) and the Forum in Xalapa (2010).

Some of her more notable works include En el Jardín del Desierto, En su Mente, Hacia el Abismo, Llegando al Fin del Día, Cuatro Puntos and a series called Cacería en el Norte.

In the 1960s, she was included in a University of Texas book about contemporary Mexican art. She was accepted as a member of the Salón de la Plástica Mexicana in 1997 and currently serves on its board.

== Artistry ==
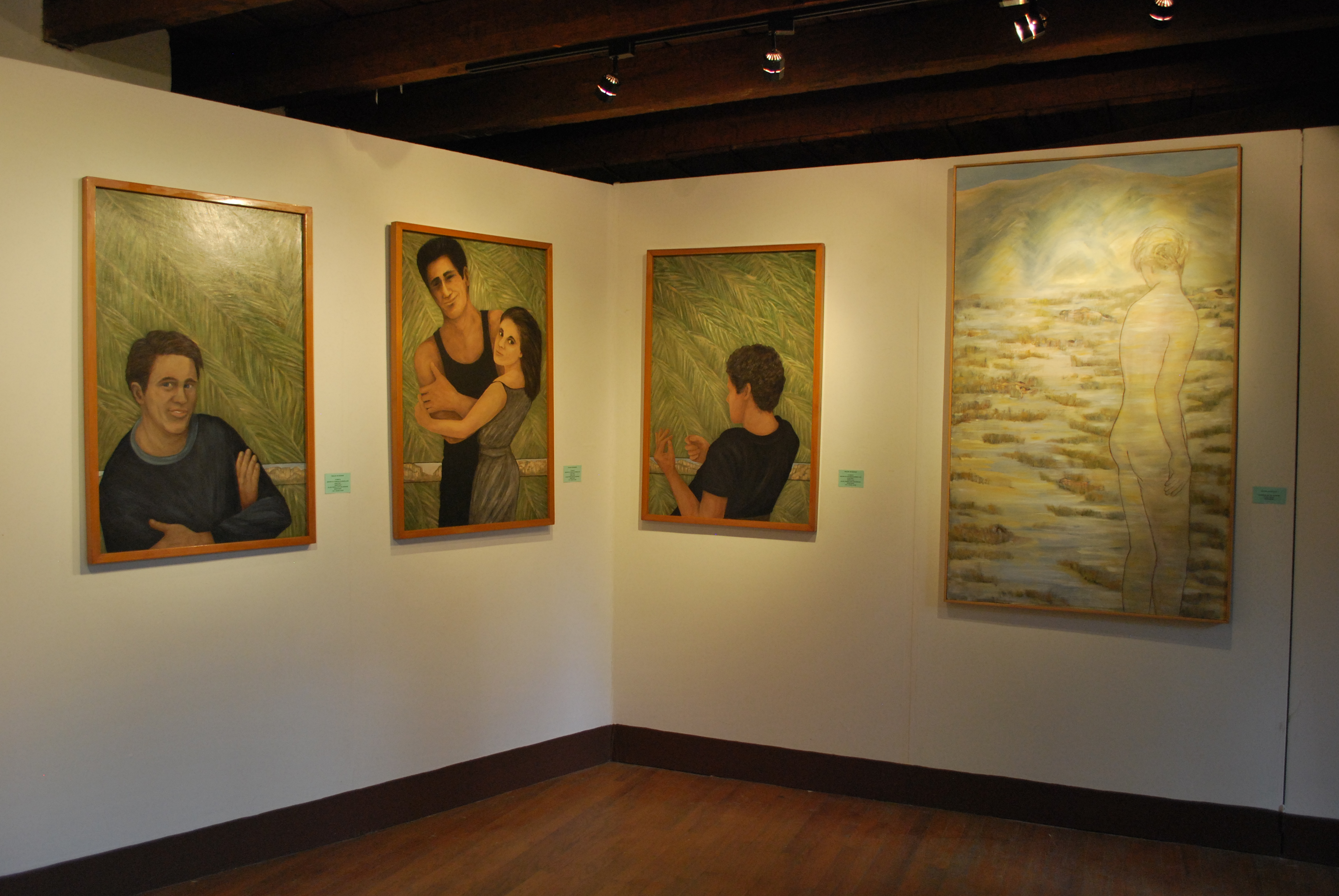
Paintings at the Valle de Bravo exhibit in 2012

Bickham has worked in a number of media including watercolor, oil, pencil, ink, lithography, engraving and paper embossing. She prefers medium to large size formats on canvas, fiberboard and museum board. She has also experimented with mixed media such as drawings over a wash and combining painting and drawing with embossing, such as with Palomas, where the doves are embossed on to the paper, flying away from the hands of a crouched woman who is drawn most exactly. She begins and erases and moves images around the canvas until she is satisfied. She considered all of her pieces to be works in progress as long as they are in her possession and for this reason does not date her work.

Her work has always focused more on common people, based on those she sees in daily life as they tend to be less reserved about their emotions. Her work is figurative, but her figures are not to photographic detail, preferring to capture a feeling rather than a subject. Her earlier work in Mexico often depicted characteristic images from Mexico, usually poor, such as street musicians, women bending over in their work, men collecting trash, people in traditional Mexican markets like La Merced, porters, farmers and more. The figures in her later work are more generic Westerners rather than Mexican but often the landscapes behind them remain Mexican. Her work has been compared to that of Diego Rivera, Rafael Coronel, and Marysole Wörner Baz.

The focus of her work is not depicting persons or landscapes, but rather to be introspective. The people in her works are anonymous composites which appear in the foreground and other elements usually one or two landscapes, in the background. The people in a work can be a single man or woman, pair or small group of people as they work, play or just exist in a natural setting. There nothing out of the ordinary about the settings but often there is something about the expression or body posture which indicates some kind of tension. She states that her goal is to express the inner emotions people have while in common activities. She has described her work as a “window on an instant”. One example of this is En el Jardin del Desierto (In the Garden of the Desert), where a man and woman stand next to each other but separated by the large thorny leaves of the maguey plant, unable to relate Often, as with this painting, the subjects of the works gaze at the onlookers as if to start a dialogue. Her work is narrative although the story may not be clear. They usually relate to relationships, isolation, introspection and readjustment She states that the goal of many of the paintings is to show a crossing, either physically or spiritually to represent personal development.

Her inspiration comes from observing people, when she can be struck by a look or movement of someone she feels has universal appeal. She has found this inspiration in various parts of Mexico, as well as Scotland and New York. Her paintings reflect her philosophical ideas from her life experiences such as travels, personal encounters, etc. She draws expressions to be understood universally, without cultural reference. “Human emotion crosses every frontier in the world.” said Bickham. “The human condition interests me. We all have such a such a hard time of it.”

As human relationships change, she has experimented with diptychs and even triptychs, paintings the pieces so that they can be rearranged and still coincide, but in a different way.

She has done some pieces in response to world events, such as the Bosnian War, the uprising in Chiapas and the murders of young women in Ciudad Júarez but does not believe in telling people how to interpret her work. She never paints violence or hate because she does not feel that they are fundamental to human nature, but rather aberrations.
