= Mound Hill Archaeological Site =

- Mound Hill Archeological Site
- U.S. National Register of Historic Places
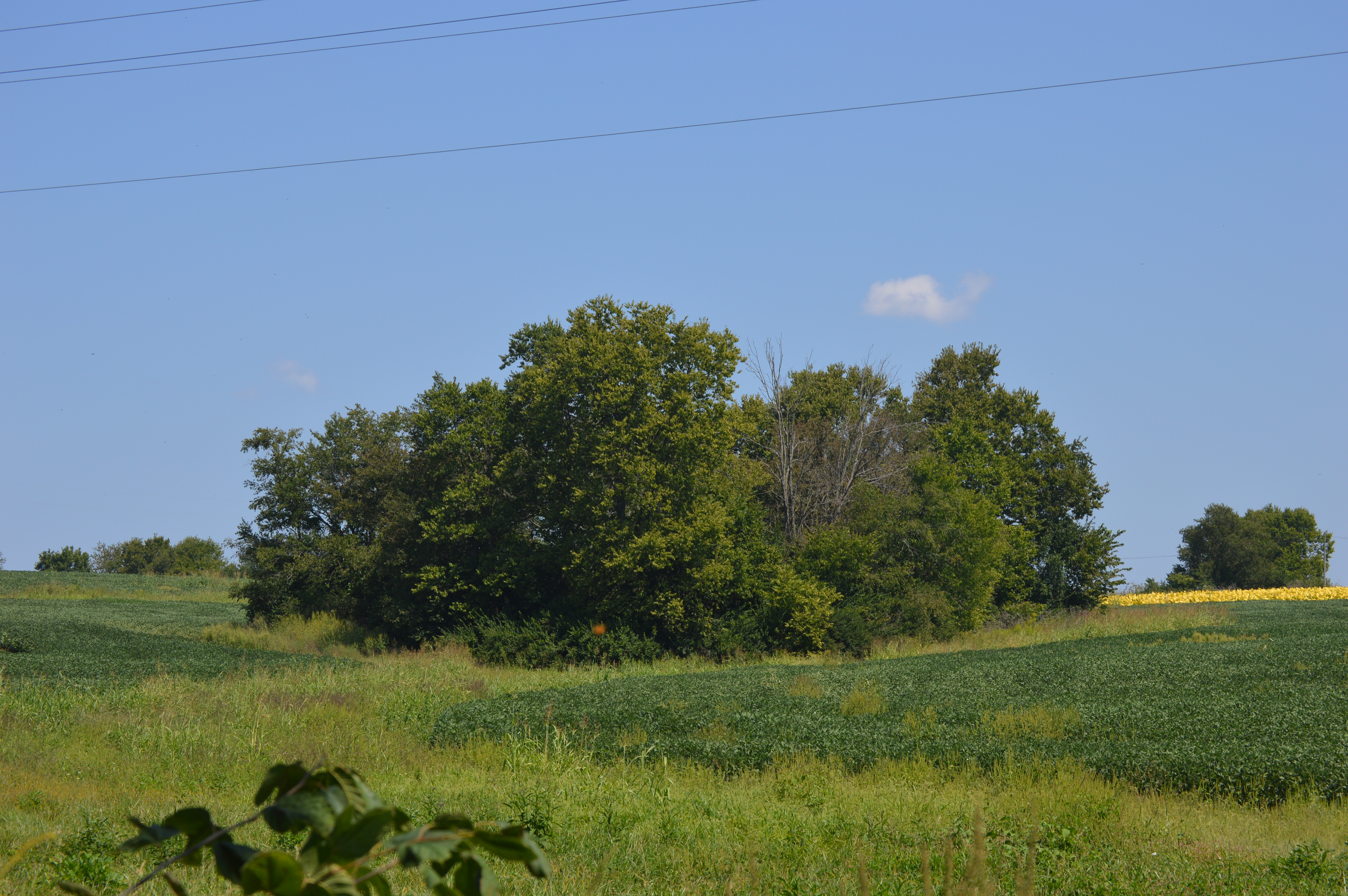
- Roadside view

- Location within Kentucky Location within the United States
- Location: 0.5 miles (0.80 km) west of the Devil's Backbone above Stoner Creek
- Nearest city: Winchester, Kentucky
- Coordinates: 38°5′49″N 84°8′1″W
- Area: 18 acres (7.3 ha)
- NRHP reference No.: 78001308
- Added to NRHP: August 25, 1978

Mound Hill (also known as the "Nelson Gay Mound") is an archaeological site in the Bluegrass region of the U.S. state of Kentucky. Located north of Winchester in far northern Clark County, the site is part of a group of Indian mounds lining Stoner Creek, although by far the largest of the group. The mound has frequently attracted attention from mapmakers and other surveyors, due to its large size; it was measured at 240 feet (73 m) (circumference) and 20 feet (6.1 m) (height) by an 1884 survey, which pronounced it a "romantic sight" due to its hilltop location between Stoner Creek and Pretty Run. The surveyors suggested that its linear shape with a central depression might have been the result of erosion or of the construction of multiple mounds that were later merged into one. It lies approximately 0.5 miles (0.80 km) west of the rest of the group, which occupies the summit of a narrow ridgeline known as the "Devil's Backbone." Digging at these mounds, which were seemingly related to Mound Hill, produced artifacts such as pottery and a pipe, as well as numerous stone box graves.

In 1978, Mound Hill was listed on the National Register of Historic Places. One of several Clark County archaeological sites on the Register, it was deemed to encompass an area of 18 acres (7.3 ha) for preservation purposes. It is believed to have been built by peoples of the Adena culture.
