= Log Lick, Kentucky =

Log Lick
- Unincorporated community
- Location within the state of Kentucky Log Lick (the United States)
- Coordinates: 37°51′29″N 84°1′37″W
- Country: United States
- State: Kentucky
- County: Clark
- Elevation: 751 ft (229 m)
- Time zone: UTC-6 (Central (CST))
  - Summer (DST): UTC-5 (CST)
- GNIS feature ID: 508490

Log Lick is an unincorporated community located in Clark County, Kentucky, United States.
