= Leeds Theater =

Coordinates: 37.99454°N 84.17617°W

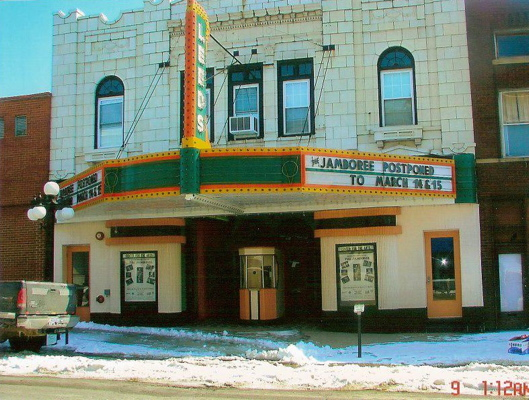
Leeds Theater, Wichester, Ky

The Leeds Theatre is a single-screen movie theater in downtown Winchester, Kentucky. One of Winchester's first movie houses, the theater was purchased by S.D. Lee, president of the Winchester Amusement Company on May 12, 1925, and opened with The Crowded Hour starring BeBe Daniels. It was later named in a contest after its first owner S.D Lee, by rearranging the letters of his name.

The theater declined in both attendance and general upkeep, closing its doors in 1986.

Shortly after, the Winchester Council for the Arts restored the theater to its original appearance. The theater reopened in 1990 as the "Leeds Center for the Arts" with new equipment, a larger stage, and the original paint color scheme of 1925. The theater remains one of Clark County's timeless treasures today, showing films from the Golden Age of Hollywood and highlighting various musical and drama performances.

== Leeds Center for the Arts ==
Leeds Center for the Arts is currently run by Executive Producer, Tracey Miller and operates as a nonprofit 501(3)(c) organization. Leeds Center for the Arts puts on yearly programming that includes master classes, plays and musicals, volunteer opportunities, and arts galleries.
