= James Clark (Kentucky politician) =

American politician (1779–1839)

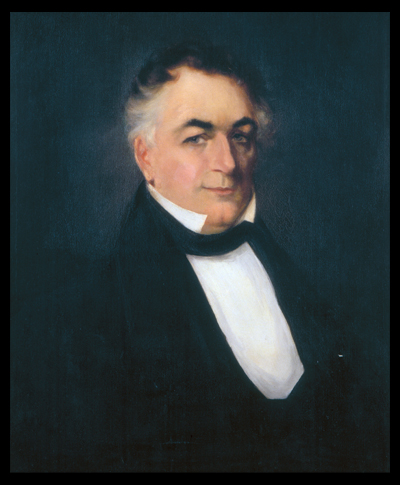
- 1908 portrait by Sophia DeButts Gray

13th Governor of Kentucky
- In office August 30, 1836 – August 27, 1839
- Lieutenant: Charles A. Wickliffe
- Preceded by: James Turner Morehead
- Succeeded by: Charles A. Wickliffe

Member of the U.S. House of Representatives from Kentucky's 3rd district
- In office August 1, 1825 – March 3, 1831
- Preceded by: Henry Clay
- Succeeded by: Chilton Allan

Member of the U.S. House of Representatives from Kentucky's 1st district
- In office March 4, 1813 – April 8, 1816
- Preceded by: Anthony New
- Succeeded by: Thomas Fletcher

Member of the Kentucky Senate
- In office 1832–1835

Member of the Kentucky House of Representatives
- In office 1807–1808

Personal details
- Born: January 16, 1779 Bedford County, Virginia
- Died: August 27, 1839 (aged 60) Frankfort, Kentucky
- Party: Whig
- Other political affiliations: Democratic Republican
- Spouse(s): Susan Forsythe; Margaret Buckner Thornton
- Relations: Brother of Christopher H. Clark; Uncle of John Bullock Clark
- Profession: Lawyer

James Clark (January 16, 1779 – August 27, 1839) was a 19th-century American politician who served in all three branches of Kentucky's government and in the U.S. House of Representatives. His political career began in the Kentucky House of Representatives in 1807. In 1810, he was appointed to the Kentucky Court of Appeals, where he served for two years before resigning to pursue a seat in the U.S. House of Representatives. He served two terms in that body, resigning in 1816.

Clark accepted an appointment to the circuit court of Bourbon and Clark counties in 1817. It was in this capacity that the most defining event of his career occurred. In 1822, he struck down a debt relief law in the case of Williams v. Blair on the basis that it impeded the obligation of contracts. His decision was unpopular with the legislature, who condemned the ruling and summoned Clark to appear before them and defend it. The following year, the Kentucky Court of Appeals upheld Clark's ruling. In retaliation, the legislature attempted to abolish the court and create a new one more sympathetic to their views. This event and its aftermath became known as the Old Court-New Court controversy.

In 1825, Clark was chosen to fill the congressional seat vacated by Henry Clay's elevation to Secretary of State. He served until 1831, but did not seek re-election that year. He became active in organizing the Whig Party in Kentucky and was rewarded for his efforts by being chosen as the party's nominee for governor in 1836. He won the election and laid out an ambitious platform to the legislature, which acted on only part of it. Clark's most significant accomplishment as governor was securing the creation of a state board of education and the establishment of public schools in every county in the state. Clark died in office in 1839. His estate, Holly Rood, was listed on the National Register of Historic Places in 1974.

== Early life and family ==
James Clark was born to Robert and Susannah (Henderson) Clark on January 16, 1779, near the Peaks of Otter in Bedford County, Virginia. In 1794, the family moved to Clark County, Kentucky, where Clark was educated by Dr. James Blythe (who later became a professor at Transylvania University) and attended Pisgah Academy in Woodford County. Clark then went to Virginia, where he studied law with his brother, Christopher. He was admitted to the bar in 1797. He briefly traveled to Vincennes, Indiana and St. Louis, Missouri looking for a place to open his practice, but finding none that suited him, he returned to Kentucky and commenced practice in Winchester.

Clark married Susan Forsythe on July 2, 1809, and the couple had four children. Susan Clark died in 1825. On March 3, 1829, James Clark married a widow named Margaret Buckner Thornton in Washington, D.C. Clark's second wife died August 15, 1836, just days after her husband was elected governor.

== Political career ==
Clark was elected to two consecutive terms in the Kentucky House of Representatives in 1807 and 1808. On March 29, 1810, he was appointed to the Kentucky Court of Appeals, and served in this capacity until his resignation in 1812. He was elected as a Democratic-Republican to the U.S. House of Representatives in 1812. He took a leave of absence on April 8, 1816, and by August 1816, had resigned his seat to accept an appointment as a circuit court judge.

=== Ruling in Williams v. Blair ===
From 1817 to 1824, Clark served on the circuit court for Clark and Bourbon counties. In the 1822 case of Williams v. Blair, he declared unconstitutional a law allowing debtors to escape bankruptcy by imposing a moratorium on their debts. He contended that the law "impaired the obligation of contracts" in violation of the Contract Clause of the U.S. Constitution. This decision was in keeping with the recent Supreme Court ruling in Dartmouth College v. Woodward.

Clark's ruling drew a resolution of condemnation from the Kentucky General Assembly. He was summoned to appear before the legislature, but opted to respond to their charges in writing instead. Incensed, the legislature attempted to remove him from office, but the vote of 59–35 fell short of the needed two-thirds majority. In October 1823, Clark's decision was upheld by the Kentucky Court of Appeals; that decision touched off the Old Court-New Court controversy, wherein the legislature attempted to abolish the Court of Appeals and replace it with a more sympathetic court.

In 1825, Clark was elected to fill the U.S. House seat left vacant by the elevation of Henry Clay to Secretary of State. He was twice re-elected, and chaired the Committee on Territories. He refused re-nomination in 1831.

Clark was then elected to the state Senate and served from 1832 to 1835. He was a member of the committee for Internal Improvements. Upon the death of Governor John Breathitt in 1834, Lieutenant Governor James Turner Morehead was elevated to governor. The office of lieutenant governor then being empty, the Senate had no presiding officer. In 1835, Clark was elected Speaker of the Senate, and presided in Morehead's absence.

=== Governor of Kentucky ===
Clark helped organize the Whig Party in Kentucky, and as a reward, he was chosen as the party's nominee for governor in 1836. He won the canvass, defeating Democrat Matthew Flournoy 38,587 to 30,491. In his first address to the legislature, he outlined an ambitious agenda of reforms, including the establishing a public school system, strengthening the office of state auditor, and combating an increase in crime. Believing that banks should be held to their responsibilities, he insisted that the state banks not suspend specie payments. A slave owner himself, he strongly believed in the rights of slave owners, and encouraged Ohio, Indiana, and Illinois to cooperate in returning escaped slaves.

The legislature heeded some of Clark's message. They added a second auditor in the office of the state auditor, and gave greater discretion to the state's sinking fund commission. They created a state board of education and the office of state superintendent. They also created county school commissioners in every county. In response to his remarks on slave property, the legislature enacted laws that raised the reward for apprehending a fugitive slave and made it illegal for stagecoach owners to allow fugitive slaves to use their coaches to escape.

However, they refused to restrict the publication and spread of abolitionist propaganda in the state, as Clark had requested, and they ignored most of his recommendations in other areas. Clark financed internal improvements in the state through the sale of bonds.

== Death ==
Clark died in office on August 27, 1839. He was buried in a private cemetery near his home in Winchester, Kentucky. The house was listed on the National Register of Historic Places on June 13, 1974.

== See also ==
- Governor Clark House
- Old Court – New Court controversy

Party political offices
First	Whig nominee for Governor of Kentucky; 1836	Succeeded by Robert P. Letcher
U.S. House of Representatives
Preceded by Anthony New	Member of the U.S. House of Representatives from Kentucky's 1st congressional district 1813–1816	Succeeded by Thomas Fletcher
Preceded by Henry Clay	Member of the U.S. House of Representatives from Kentucky's 3rd congressional district 1825–1831	Succeeded by Chilton Allan
Political offices
Preceded by James Morehead	Governor of Kentucky; 1836–1839	Succeeded by Charles A. Wickliffe
