= Pinchem, Kentucky =

Pinchem, Kentucky may refer to two unincorporated communities:

- Pinchem, Clark County, Kentucky
- Pinchem, Todd County, Kentucky
