= Bluegrass Heritage Museum =

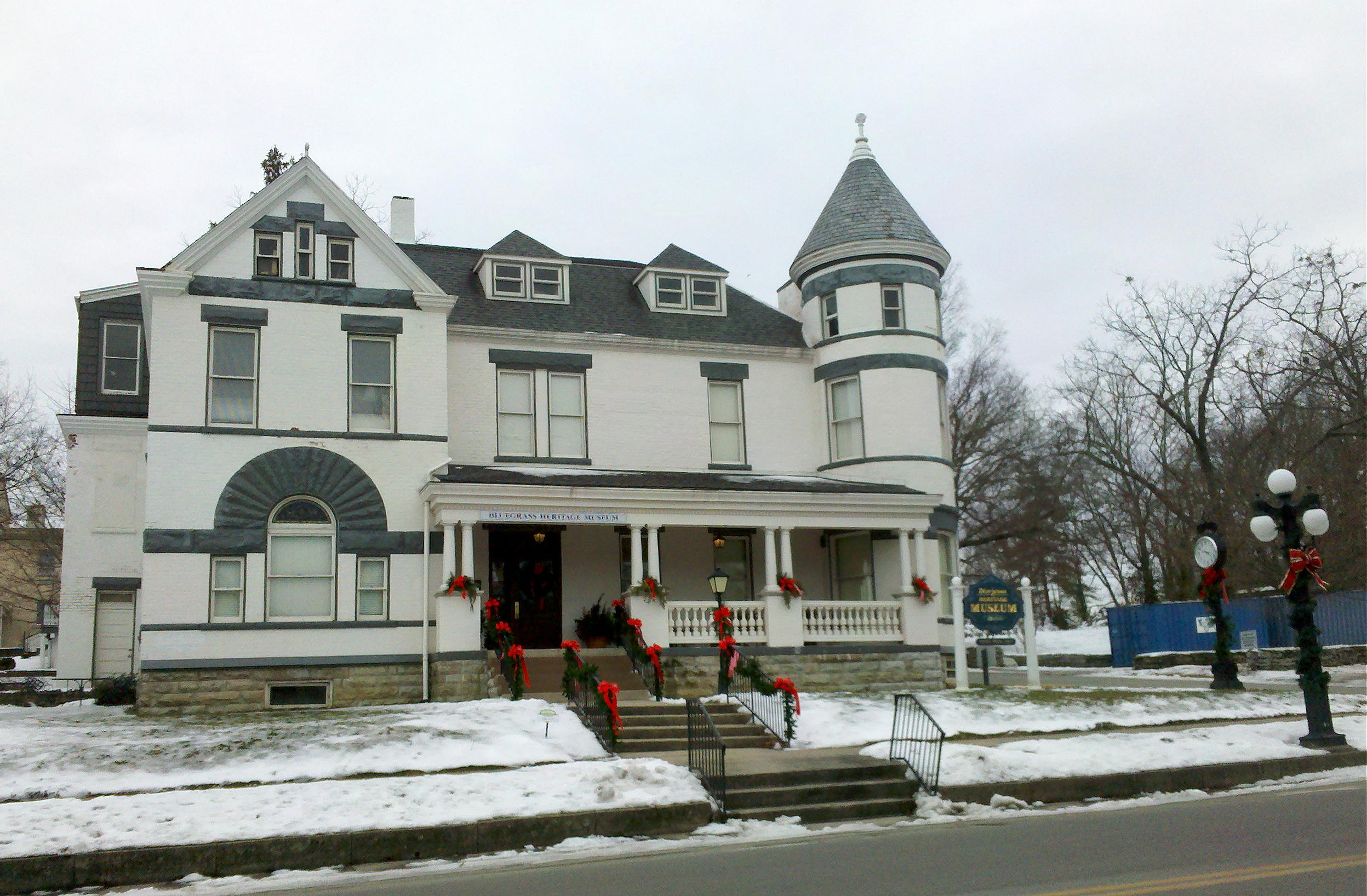

- Location in Kentucky
- Location: 217 South Main Street, Winchester, Kentucky
- Coordinates: 37.989840°N 84.178475°W
- Type: Local history museum
- Director: Sandra Stults
- Website: www.bgheritage.com

Bluegrass Heritage Museum is a local history museum in Winchester, Kentucky. The museum explores many eras, ranging from the Eskippakithiki Indian Village (a branch of the Shawnee), to Daniel Boone and his settlement of Boonesboro, and to the modern day. The exhibits are distributed across the building's three floors, and include the former use of the building as a medical clinic, local agricultural and military history, and collections of quilts and telephones. The museum also holds public programming related to Kentucky's Civil War heritage. The museum also houses the collections of the former Pioneer Telephone Museum.

== History ==
=== Building ===
The museum is housed in a former medical clinic whose architecture is considered to be Romanesque Revival. The earliest owner of the building was well respected physician, Dr. Ishmael. He opened his office in 1887 and practiced medicine up until his death in 1920. In 1927, Edward Putney Guerrant, a physician, turned the building into the Guerrant Clinic and Hospital, which it remained until the early 1970s. The Guerrant's son, Edward Owings Guerrant, joined the medical practice following his military service in World War II. Edward Putney Guerrant died on June 17, 1964. Edward Owings Guerrant practiced medicine until 1985 and died on May 9, 1993. The building last served as a clinic in 1989. The museum has preserved some of the clinic's medical instruments for display, as well as the third floor's operating room.

=== Telephone collection ===
In 2009, the museum became home to the collection of the Pioneer Telephone Museum, formerly located in Winchester's Bell South building. The collection includes antique crank phones, early switchboards, and other telephone memorabilia.

=== Preservation ===
Winchester community members began efforts, in 2000, to house a museum in the former clinic, which had been abandoned for eleven years. By then, the building had fallen into disrepair, and the museum board estimated it would cost half a million dollars to fully renovate the clinic. Via a partnership with city and county officials, the museum opened in stages: the first floor opened first, in 2004; the second and third floors were repaired and opened over the following six years.
