= Southeastern Christian College =

Former private college in Winchester, Kentucky

Coordinates: 37.9916°N 84.1870°W

Southeastern Christian College provided a two-year liberal arts degree and a three-year degree in biblical studies in Winchester, Kentucky from 1957 to 1979. Following its closure, the college formed a non-profit in 1983, the Southeastern Christian Education Corporation, to provide scholarships to students from a list of Churches of Christ congregations.

== History ==
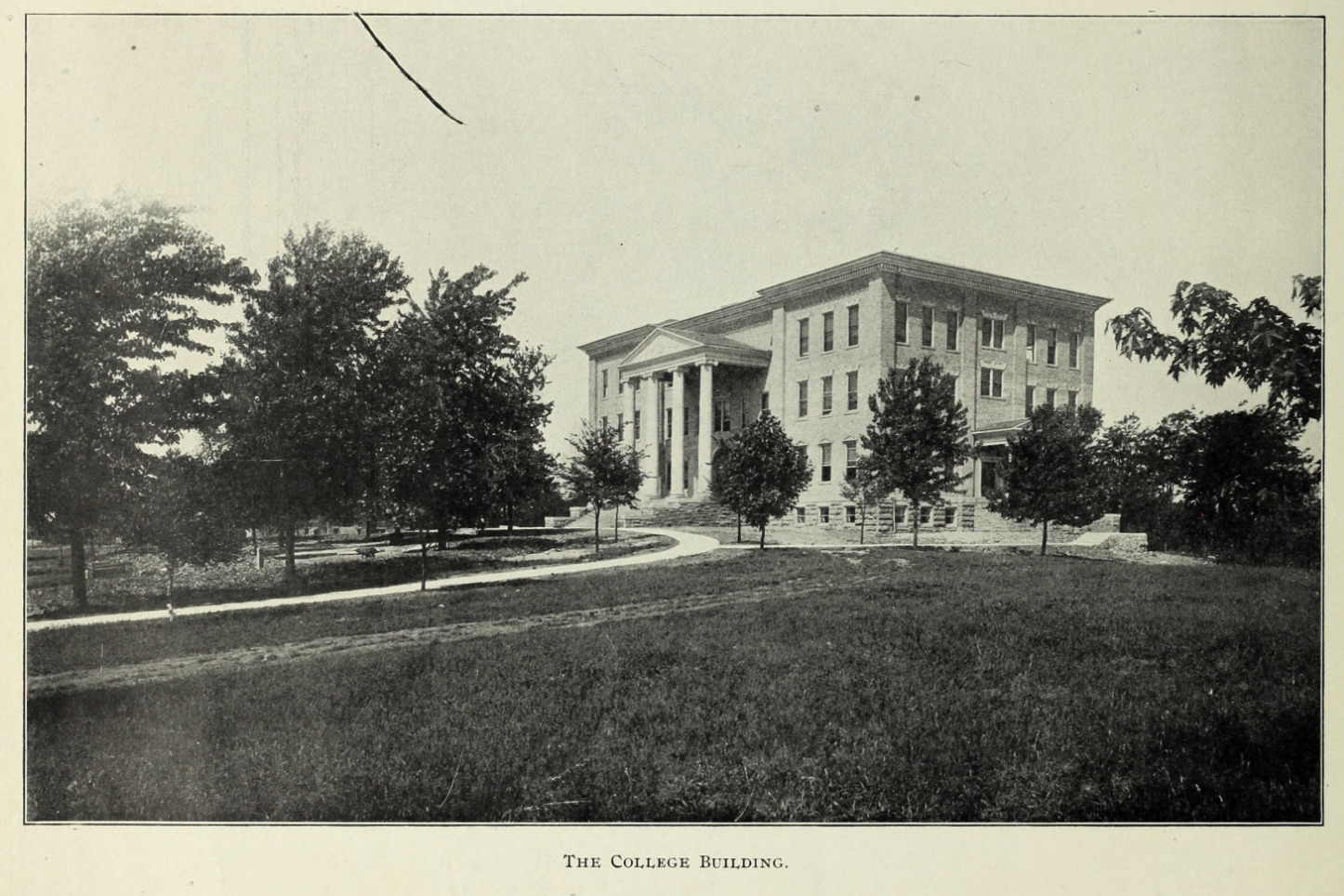
College Building, Kentucky Wesleyan College (Winchester, Kentucky) in 1909. The future administration building for Southeastern Christian College.

The origins of Southeastern Christian College began in 1949 in Louisville, Kentucky. It was first incorporated as "Kentucky Bible College" on March 23, 1950, at 2500 Portland Ave, Louisville, KY. At its founding it was co-located with Portland Avenue Church of Christ and the Portland Christian School. The filing for incorporation listed three people as the board of directors: Carl Vogt Wilson, Albert Von Allmen, and James H. Frazee. In its 1954 annual report to the state government, the college declared its plans to move to Winchester in September of that year to occupy the former location of Kentucky Wesleyan College on Wheeler Avenue. In 1957, the college's president, Winston N. Allen, notified the Commonwealth of Kentucky that Kentucky Bible College had been renamed to Southeastern Christian College.

Southeastern Christian College was accredited as a two-year college, but also offered a subsequent, three-year degree as a bible college. The college was established as an educational institution informed by the interests of the Churches of Christ that sympathized with premillennialism -- Robert Henry Boll, the minister at Portland Avenue Church of Christ from 1904 to 1956, was a key figure in both the establishment of the college and the premillennial movement in the Churches of Christ. The college provided a meeting place for many debates about the nature and direction of the Church of Christ movement. For example, in an effort to encourage unity in the churches, “Rightist” and “Centrist” leaders met on the campus in 1959 to address a “factional spirit” in the movement. However, the efforts to foster unity in the Churches of Christ sometimes resulted in controversy; in 1970 the president (LaVern Houtz) and ten of the college's fifteen faculty members were asked to resign for their acceptance a charismatic movement in American Christianity.

With approximately serving 3000 students in its thirty-year existence, Southeastern Christian College was always small; it struggled to support itself with tuition, grants, and gifts from the churches that funded it. The college closed in 1979 for lack of funds. Purchased by Clark County, Kentucky, most of the campus buildings have been demolished, but the site now serves as a municipal park, College Park.

== Publications ==
The college published an annual yearbook, The Beacon (later renamed The Torch), of enrolled students.

== College presidents ==
- Winston N. Allen, 1950
- Hall Crowder, Pres., Board of Directors, 1961
- N. Wilson Burks, 1962
- LaVern Houtz, 1964
- Victor N. Broaddus, 1970
