= Pilot View, Kentucky =

Pilot View
- Unincorporated community
- Location within the state of Kentucky Pilot View (the United States)
- Coordinates: 37°58′4″N 84°3′50″W
- Country: United States
- State: Kentucky
- County: Clark
- Elevation: 1,047 ft (319 m)
- Time zone: UTC-5 (Eastern (EST))
  - Summer (DST): UTC-4 (EST)
- GNIS feature ID: 500654

Pilot View is an unincorporated community located in Clark County, Kentucky, United States. Pilot View is situated along Kentucky Route 15 and is located 7 miles east of Winchester.

The name of the town was originally suggested to be Scholl-Goff, as the roads connected to the town go to Schollsville and Goffs Corner. After Maj. John N. Conkwright remarked "Is not this a grand view?", referencing the nearby Pilot Knob, a local storeowner suggested the name Pilot View. A post office was created for the town in 1893 but was closed in 1904.
