= Kerr Building =

- S. P. Kerr Building
- U.S. Historic district – Contributing property
- Location within Kentucky Location within the United States
- Location: Winchester, Kentucky
- Coordinates: 37.9936°N 84.1767°W
- Built: 1889
- Part of: Winchester Downtown Commercial District (ID82002681)
- Designated CP: April 28, 1982

The S. P. Kerr Building is a historic building on the northwest corner of North Main Street and West Broadway in Winchester, Kentucky. The building is listed in the National Register of Historic Places as a contributing property in the Winchester Downtown Commercial District. Built in 1889, it is a three-story brick building with stone sills and lintels and a rounded corner entrance flanked by rough-hewn stone columns. The building contains about 32,000 square feet (3,000 m^{2}) of space.

The Kerr Building originally housed Eclipse Mills, but in later years it was home to J. J. Newberry's and The Corner Drug Store. By 1999, the building was vacant and in disrepair. As a result of the deterioration, the Bluegrass Trust for Historic Preservation placed the Kerr Building on its "11th Hour" Most Endangered list. In 2001, the building was purchased by Union Properties and Bailey Associates, who began refurbishing the building in August 2002, including repairing water damage, leaks in the roof, and worn storefronts. The renovations took more than three years (it was completed in December 2005) and cost more than $2 million. The building now houses around 18,000 square feet (1,700 m^{2}) of senior living space and 9,000 square feet (840 m^{2}) of commercial space.

The wooden rooster on the roof of the building is said to have been placed there as the result of a bet involving the outcome of the 1932 presidential election. The original rooster eventually disappeared, but a replacement was installed during the 2002 renovation.

== See also ==
- Clark County Court House: also a contributing building to the historic district
- National Register of Historic Places listings in Clark County, Kentucky
