= Forest Grove, Kentucky =

Forest Grove
- Unincorporated community
- Location within the state of Kentucky Forest Grove (the United States)
- Coordinates: 37°56′44″N 84°13′28″W
- Country: United States
- State: Kentucky
- County: Clark
- Elevation: 1,047 ft (319 m)
- Time zone: UTC-5 (Eastern (EST))
  - Summer (DST): UTC-4 (EST)
- GNIS feature ID: 492319

Forest Grove is an unincorporated community located in Clark County, Kentucky, United States. It was also known as Germantown. Note that Germantown, Kentucky is not the same place.
