= Pinchem, Clark County, Kentucky =

Pinchem
- Unincorporated community
- Location within the state of Kentucky Pinchem (the United States)
- Coordinates: 37°55′34″N 84°9′36″W
- Country: United States
- State: Kentucky
- County: Clark
- Elevation: 794 ft (242 m)
- Time zone: UTC-6 (Central (CST))
  - Summer (DST): UTC-5 (CST)
- GNIS feature ID: 508822

Pinchem is an unincorporated community in Clark County, Kentucky, United States.
