= Winchester Downtown Commercial District =

Historic district in Kentucky, United States

- U.S. National Register of Historic Places
- U.S. Historic district
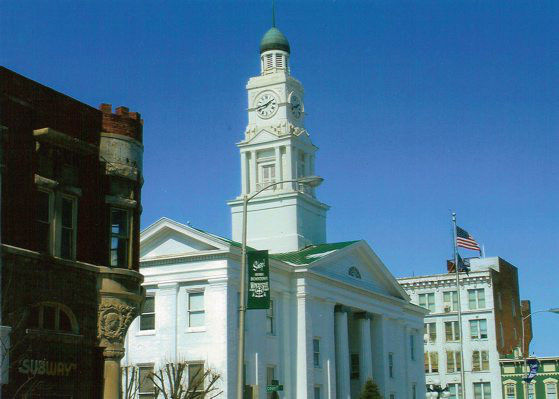
- Clark County Court House

- Location within Kentucky Location within the United States
- Location: Roughly bounded by RR tracks, KY 627, Maple and Highland Sts., Winchester, Kentucky
- Coordinates: 37.9935°N 84.17692°W
- Area: 21 acres (8.5 ha)
- Built: 1830
- Architect: Multiple
- Architectural style: Mixed (more than 2 styles from different periods)
- NRHP reference No.: 82002681
- Added to NRHP: April 28, 1982

The Winchester Downtown Commercial District is a 21 acres (8.5 ha) historic district that was listed on the National Register of Historic Places in 1982. It included 114 contributing buildings.

It includes both the 1853 Clark County Court House and the 1889 S. P. Kerr Building on the northwest corner of North Main Street and West Broadway. The building contains about 32,000 square feet (3,000 m^{2}) of space.
