= Middle Reaches of Boone Creek Rural Historic District =

Historic district in Kentucky, United States

- U.S. National Register of Historic Places
- Location within Kentucky Location within the United States
- Location: Roughly bounded by U.S. Route 421 (Kentucky), Jones Nursery, Coombs Ferry, Sulpher Well Rds., and U.S. Route 25, in the general vicinity of Lexington, Kentucky
- Coordinates: 37°57′34″N 84°19′17″W
- Area: 7,186 acres (29.08 km^{2})
- Built: 1820 and on
- Architectural style: Federal
- NRHP reference No.: 96000429
- Added to NRHP: May 31, 1996

The Middle Reaches of Boone Creek Rural Historic District in the Clark County, Kentucky and Fayette County, Kentucky is a historic district which was listed on the National Register of Historic Places in 1996.

It is a 7,186 acres (29.08 km^{2}) area roughly bounded by U.S. Route 421 (Kentucky), Jones Nursery, Coombs Ferry, Sulpher Well Rds., and U.S. Route 25. The listing included 38 contributing buildings, 97 contributing structures, and five contributing sites.

It includes three properties which were already separately listed on the National Register, all in Clark County:

- Boot Hill Farm,
- Dailey-Milton Holliday House, and
- Captain Robert V. Bush House.
