= Pine Grove, Kentucky =

Pine Grove
- Unincorporated community
- Location within the state of Kentucky Pine Grove (the United States)
- Coordinates: 38°00′7″N 84°18′57″W
- Country: United States
- State: Kentucky
- County: Clark
- Elevation: 958 ft (292 m)
- Time zone: UTC-5 (Eastern (EST))
  - Summer (DST): UTC-4 (EST)
- GNIS feature ID: 500679

Pine Grove is an unincorporated community located in Clark County, Kentucky, United States. Its post office is closed.
