= Clark Mansion (Winchester, Kentucky) =

Historic house in Kentucky, United States

- Gov. James A. Clark Mansion
- U.S. National Register of Historic Places
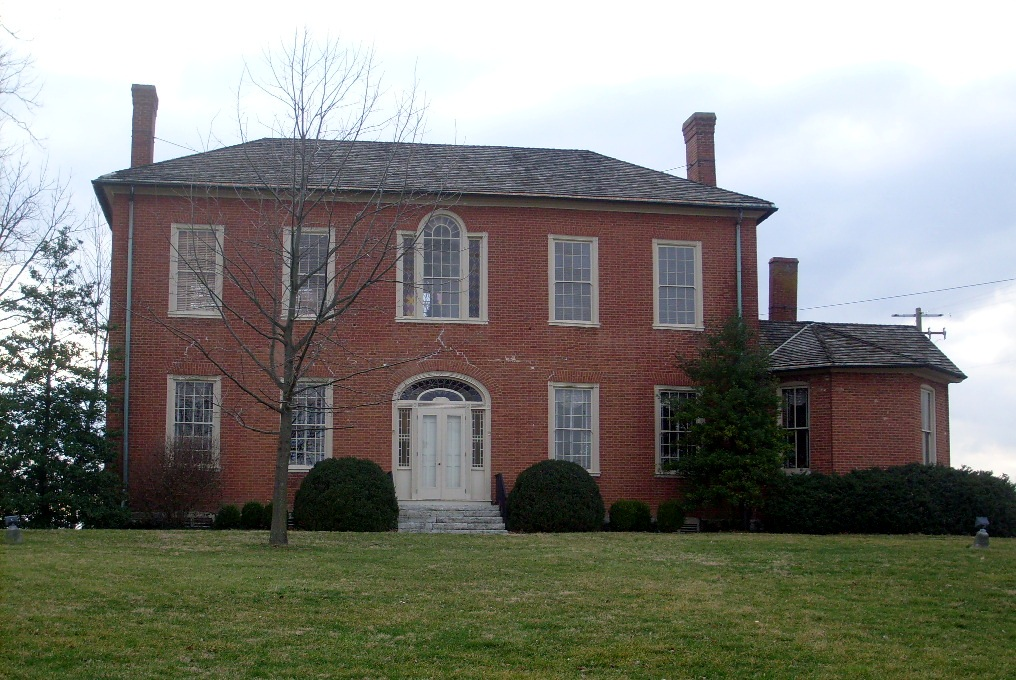
- Governor James Clark House

- Location within Kentucky Location within the United States
- Location: 28 Beckner St., Winchester, Kentucky
- Coordinates: 37°59′20″N 84°11′16″W
- Area: less than one acre
- Built: 1813–1814
- Architectural style: Georgian, Federal
- NRHP reference No.: 74000859
- Added to NRHP: June 13, 1974

Clark Mansion also known as Holly Rood or the Gov. James A. Clark Mansion, is one of the most historic homes in Clark County, Kentucky.

Construction began in 1813 for James Clark who was 13th governor of Kentucky and was finished in 1814. It was built specifically for James and his wife, who named it after her father. Clark Mansion is historically significant for its Federal architecture. It is a single building on less than 1-acre (4,000 m2) of land. It is a two-story brick painted red house with a wide front porch and Ionic columns. It also has a wide entrance and the 2nd story has a Palladian window.

Clark Mansion sits away from the road and has a huge front yard. It is located close to Hannah McClure Elementary, Library and College Park. The building was added to the National Register of Historic Places in 1974. As it is owned by the local government, people can tour the house and view its antique furniture. It is often used for formal events including weddings.

Clark was buried in a private burial ground in the old Clark home at Winchester, Clark County, Kentucky. A Monument was built in the place where he was buried.
