= George French Ecton =

American politician

- Ecton in 1887

Member of the Illinois House of Representatives
- In office 1888–1890

Personal details
- Born: c. 1846 Winchester, Kentucky, U.S.
- Died: September 19, 1929 (aged 82–83) Chicago, Illinois
- Party: Republican
- Spouse: Patti R. Allen (m. 1877)
- Occupation: Waiter, politician

George French Ecton (c. 1846 – September 19, 1929) was a civil rights activist and the second African American state legislator in Illinois. He was born a slave in Winchester, Kentucky, in about 1846 to Antonio Ecton and Martha George. In June 1865, after the American Civil War and the abolition of slavery, George and a friend received free papers in the mail and set off to escape slavery, as they were still being held in bondage. When they arrived in Cincinnati, Ohio, they were hired as deck hands on the steam packet Sherman, working a route between Cincinnati and Wheeling, West Virginia. Later, in Cincinnati, George worked at hotels, including the Broadway House, Walnut Street House, Burnett House, and Spencer House. He became ill with smallpox while at the Walnut Street House, but recovered. He also began to attend night school taught by Luella Brown. He was reported to be a college graduate.

On October 28, 1873, he moved to Chicago and took charge of the dining room at the Hotel Woodruff. In 1877 he married Patti R. Allen, also from Winchester. In Chicago, Ecton became active in Republican politics. He held his job as a waitor until being elected to the Illinois General Assembly, serving from 1887 to 1889. Ecton was elected from the third district to the Illinois House of Representatives, and replaced John W. E. Thomas, Illinois' first black state representative. He introduced legislation that protected former slaves. After his term, he became owner of a baseball league. He continued to be a leader in Chicago Republican politics into the 1910s.

In Chicago, he was a member of Bethesda Baptist Church and was a freemason. He died on September 19, 1929, in Chicago.
