= Walter Speedy Sr. =

American golfer

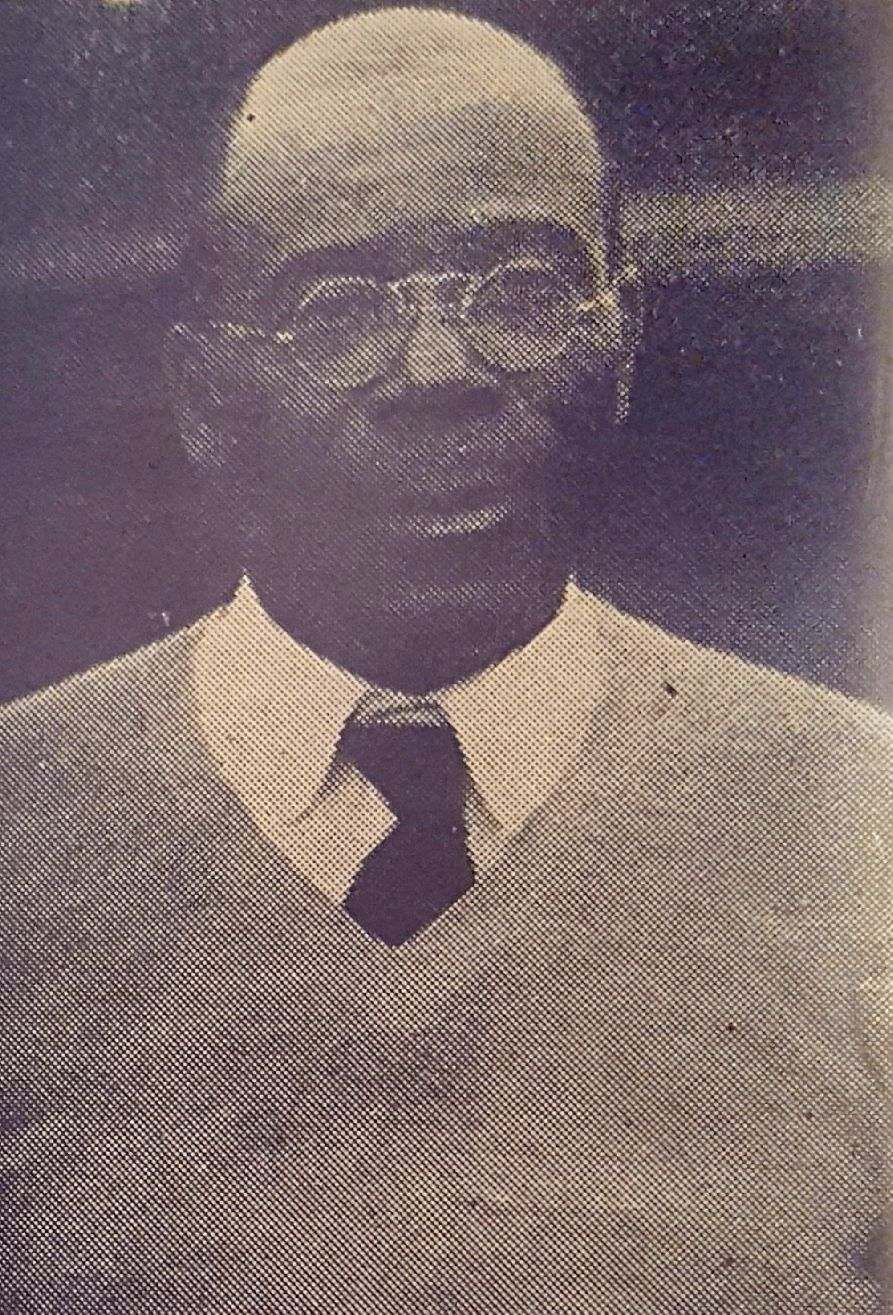
Walter Speedy

Walter Speedy Sr. (1878–1943) was an American golfer noted for his contributions to African-American golf play. He was coined as the "Father of African-American Golf".

== Early golfing ==
It was believed that his passion for golf began as a caddie in his home state, where he was born in 1878 in Concordia Parish, Louisiana. In 1900, at the age of twenty-two, he relocated to Chicago, Illinois and became one of the city's best African-American male golfers. He was a pioneering crusader in the pursuit of competitive playing opportunities for black golfers and stayed interested in national and local issues pertaining to African-Americans in golf until the 1940s.

== Personal life ==
He was married to The Chicago Defender journalist and the reportedly, first African-American woman to play golf, Nettie George Speedy.

== Early involvement in combating discrimination in the Chicago golf scene ==
Walter and Nettie both took the lead in the fight for African-Americans to be able to play golf on Chicago's public courses. As early as 1910, Walter Speedy and three other black golfers hired a lawyer to defend them from the people who would not let them play in the Chicago city golf tournament at Jackson Park.

On October 7, 1915, Walter Speedy won the first Golf Tournament ever hosted in the US by expert "Race" golfers (African-American) and was held at Marquette Golf Links.

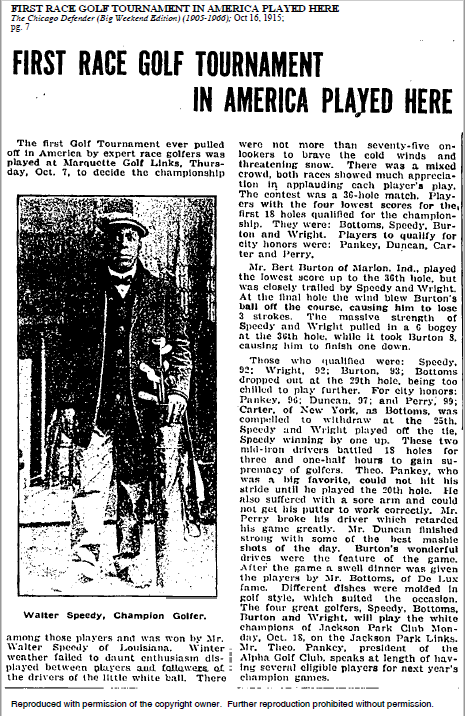
The First Tournament

On the 23rd day of October 1915, an article in The Chicago Defender stated that the golf champion Walter Speedy had been challenged to play a match. "The Lincoln A.C. wants to put the McDougal brothers against Speedy and Wright or put Horace McDougal against Walter Speedy for the Championship."

== Alpha Golf Club ==
Speedy was one of a group of African-American men who, in 1915, founded another organization that they called the Alpha Golf Club in response to their frustration at not being able to compete against a wider range of golfers in formal competitions."If their playing is sufficient enough for them to qualify with the field of players, the Alpha Club will be pleased to accept the challenge. If they wish a private match with either Mr. Speedy or Wright, they will be pleased to play with you. Further, writing to Mr. Burton, secretary of the Alpha Club, 3732 Forest Avenue.", was the response to the challenge according to Young (journalist) in his report in the Chicago Defender on November 16, 1915.

== Windy City Golf ==
According to Dawkins and Kinloch's book, African American Golfers During the Jim Crow Era, most African Americans founded golf clubs on the East Coast and in the Midwest, with a handful in the South. Despite the fact that Alpha Golf Club was founded before to World War I, a dozen additional clubs emerged in the 1920s. The Chicago Defender announced on July 31, 1920, that the Windy City Golf Association was awarded a charter for the first time in history an all-black golf club. The club's stated mission is "to generate excitement and interest in the game of golf." Horace McDougal served as vice president, Robert Ball as financial secretary, Nettie George Speedy as recording secretary, and Henry B. Johnson as the club's treasurer, all under the leadership of club president Walter Speedy. Typical of golf clubs, meetings to organize outings and festivities were conducted in club members' homes or local pharmacies, and players played on public courses.

According to a Chicago Defender article, in 1921, Walter Speedy represented the Windy Golf Association with South Park Commissioners Foster regarding the participation of the Windy Golf Association's members in the City Golf competition to be held at Jackson Park. Members of Windy City Golf claim that discrimination prevented them from participating in the competition. When they applied for reservations, they were given permission to take part in the competition, but when they were about to "tee off," the golfers realized that their names had been changed and replaced in the registration books.

For many years, the Chicago Amateur Championship was held at Jackson Park, and up until 1920, there were no rules about who could play. When V. K. Brown became superintendent in 1920, a new rule went into effect: only members of the Western Golf Association (WGA), a club for white people, could play in the city tournament. Yet, George Hartman, a white player, won the tournament in 1920, even though he was not a member of the WGA. Again in 1922, the same rule was enforced: only WGA members could participate. The Windy City Golf Association said it would fight the policy in court because Jackson Park was a public course.

In 1923, through its president, Walter Speedy, the Windy City Golf Club challenged the Shady Rest Golf and Country Club to play for the United States championship. Members of any other organized golf club in the country were given the challenge.

== Pioneer Golf Club ==
The Pioneer Golf Club (previously Windy City) of Chicago discussed the UGA national tournament in late August and early September in mid-February 1930. Chicago was ready to show off its golf skills with the first two tournaments in Maple Dale in Massachusetts and the third and fourth at Shady Rest in New Jersey. President Walter Speedy of the Pioneer Club and Dr. E. J. Ricks, Vice President of the National Golf Association, planned the fifth national competition and recognized the strength of golfers from Philadelphia, Boston, Washington, and other locations. "Organized golf is still among the newer sports for our people, and this will be the largest gathering for golf yet," the Chicago Defender remarked.

== Chicago Trophy Golfer's Club ==
In 1937 Chicago Trophy Golfer's Club, which replaced the Pioneer Golf Club, elected Matthew Bivens as President, Ralph Chilton as Vice President, and Al Monroe, the Chicago Defender's sports editor, and publicity director, but no women to the executive committee. The Chicago Defender said nearly 2,000 Chicago golfers sought "greater outlets for their golfing talents." Three weeks later, Pat Ball told a Defender writer that Chicago would do well in golf this season. "We plan to give Walter Speedy, the father of golf in this city, and Joe Louis lifetime honorary memberships," said President Bivens. Bivens urged a clubhouse for members, wives, and visitors, suggesting the new club would welcome women and start a women's division immediately.

== Death and legacy ==
Walter Speedy suffered pneumonia and died in November 1943. Numerous friends, many of them golfers, attended his funeral in Chicago. In Springfield, Ohio, where she resided until her death a few years later, his wife Nettie interred his remains next to her parents. The Chicago Women's Club changed the name of its annual tournament to the "Walter Speedy Memorial Tournament" in honor of the man who was influential in the club's formation.

Nettie and Walter had a son named Walter Speedy Jr., who was born in Chicago, Illinois on November 14, 1915 and died in January 1993.

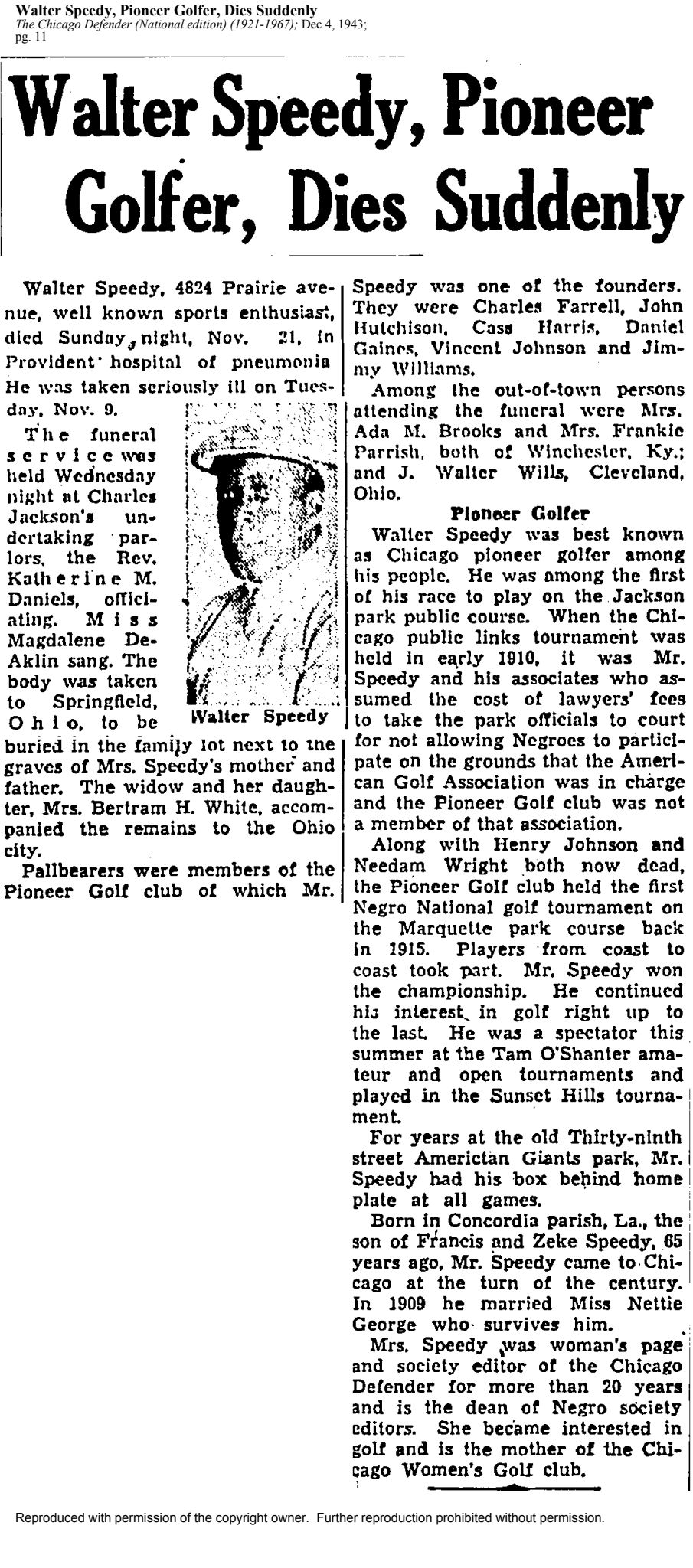
Walte Speedy, golfer, Dies
