= Winchester Opera House =

Opera house in Winchester, Kentucky

Coordinates: 37.9915°N 84.1777°W

The Opera House in Winchester, Kentucky, United States was designed in 1873 by the first Mayor of Winchester, J. D. Simpson. The opera house was a gift from the mayor to Winchester's citizens so they could enjoy performing arts. It hosted off-Broadway and classical concerts.

The building fell to industrialization and became rundown from years of neglect. It was bought by Edward and Vanessa Ziembroski in 2003, who renovated the building.
