= Nettie George Speedy =

American journalist and golfer (1878–1957)

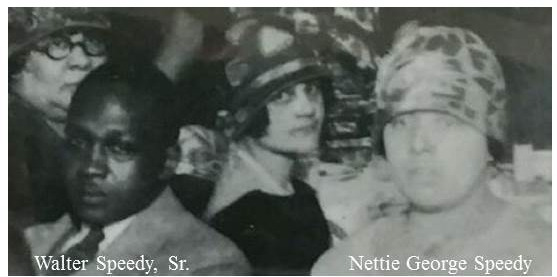
Picture of Walter Speedy and Nettie George Speedy

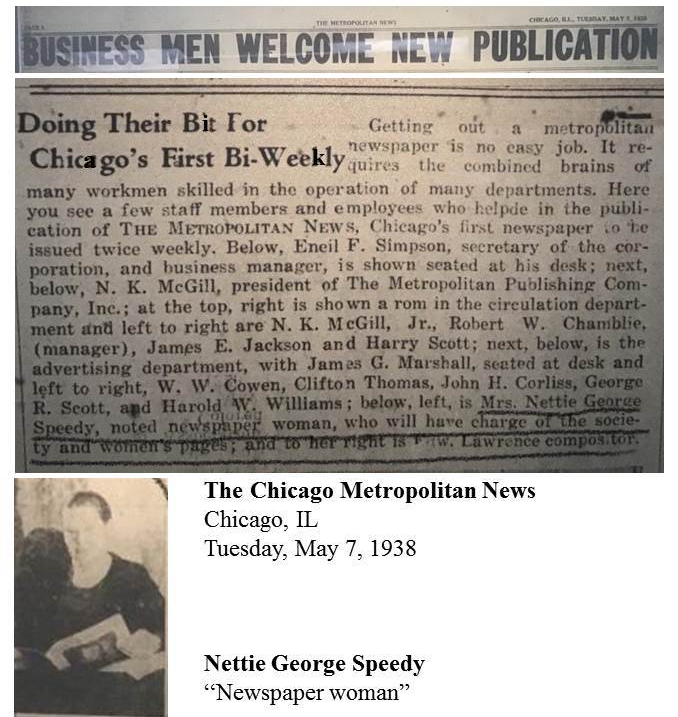
Nettie George Speedy

Nettie George Speedy (née George; November 3, 1878 – July 7, 1957) was an American journalist and golfer. She worked for the Chicago Defender and The Metropolitan Post. Speedy was the first Black woman to play golf in Chicago and among the first to play anywhere in the United States. She founded the Chicago Women's Golf Club, and was the first woman to sit on the trustee board of Lane College in Jackson, Tennessee.

== Early life and education ==
She was born in Winchester, Kentucky to Hubbard, a carpenter, and Ruth Wills George. Her family moved to Springfield, Ohio in 1879, and her mother died in 1883. Her father remarried Dora Wade in May 1886 and died six months later. Nettie returned to Winchester, Kentucky, following the deaths of her parents, before migrating to Kansas with her sister Nora in 1895 and enrolling at Parsons High School. By 1900, she had returned to Winchester, Kentucky, where she taught school. Nettie relocated from Kentucky to Chicago to live with her brother, Frank P. George.

She married Walter Speedy Sr., a tailor with a passion for golf. They are both pioneers of African American golf.

== Career ==
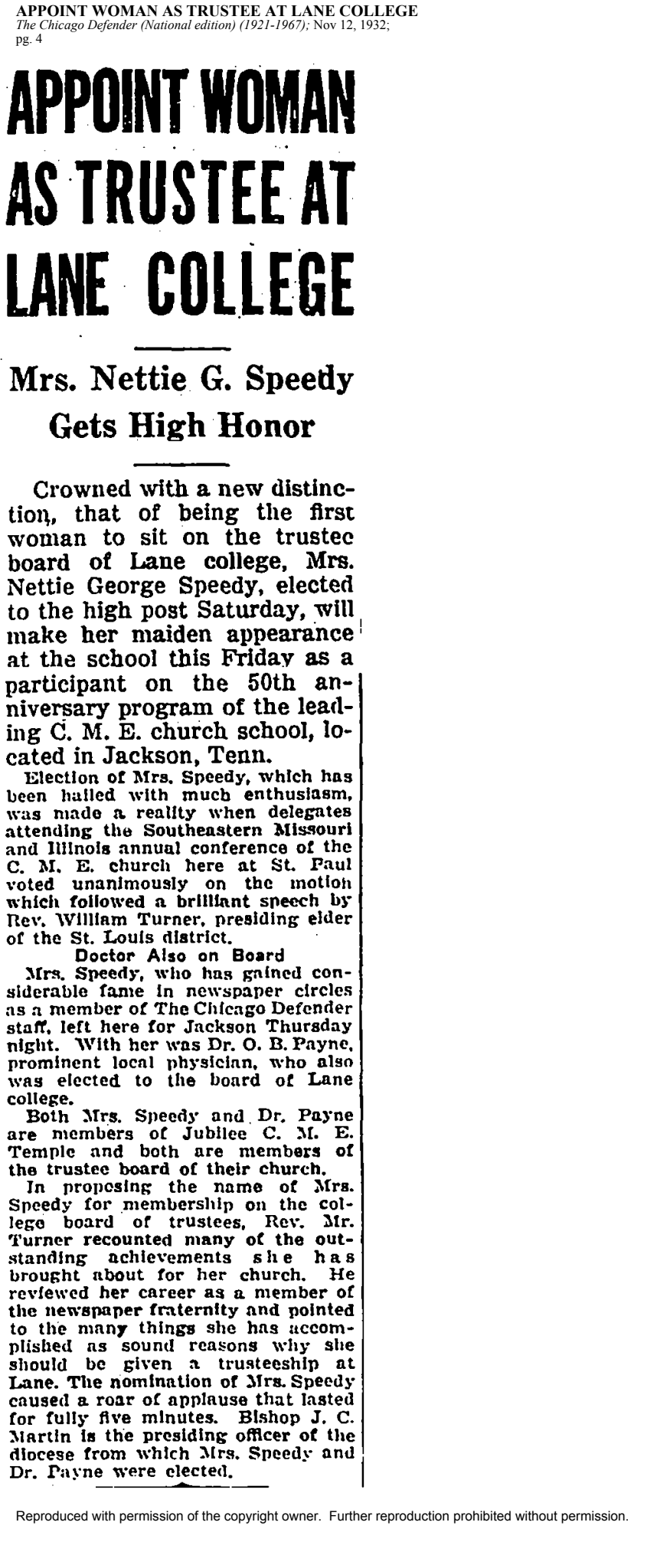
First woman appointed as a trustee

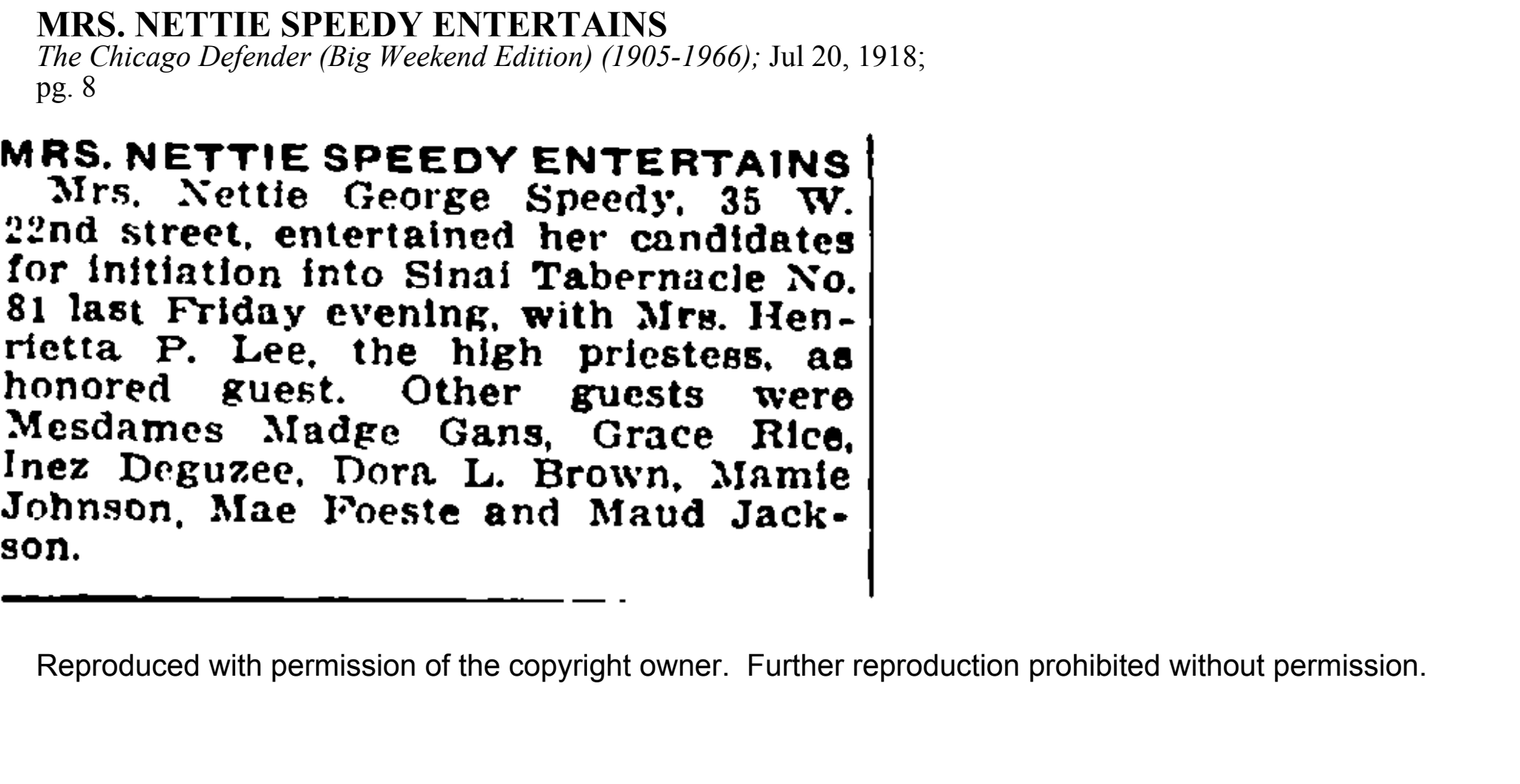
Nettie Speedy Entertains

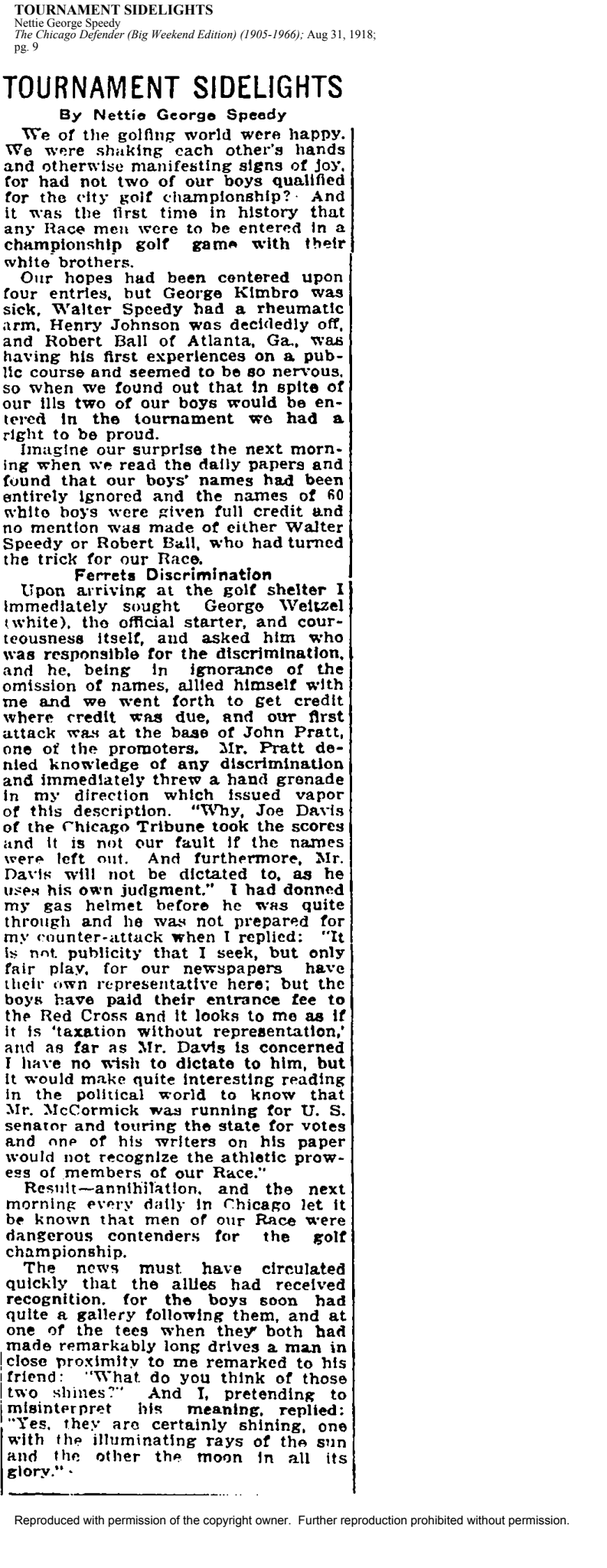
"The Sidelight" by Nettie George Speedy"

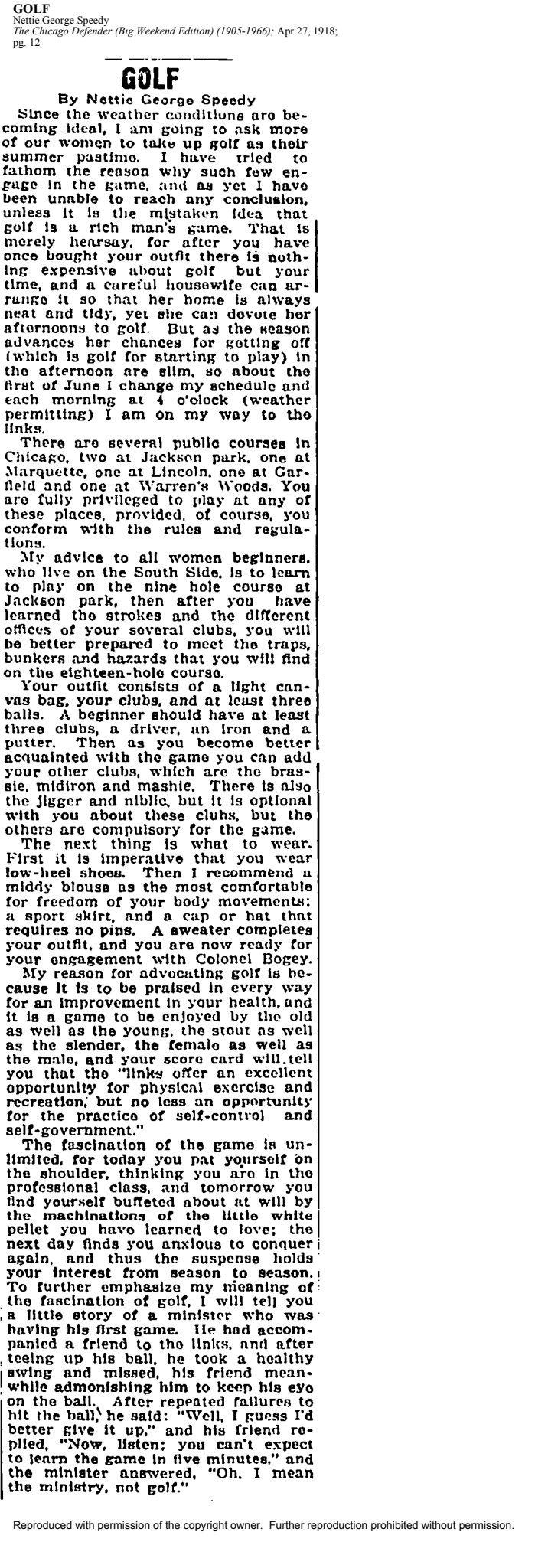
Golf By Nettie Speedy.

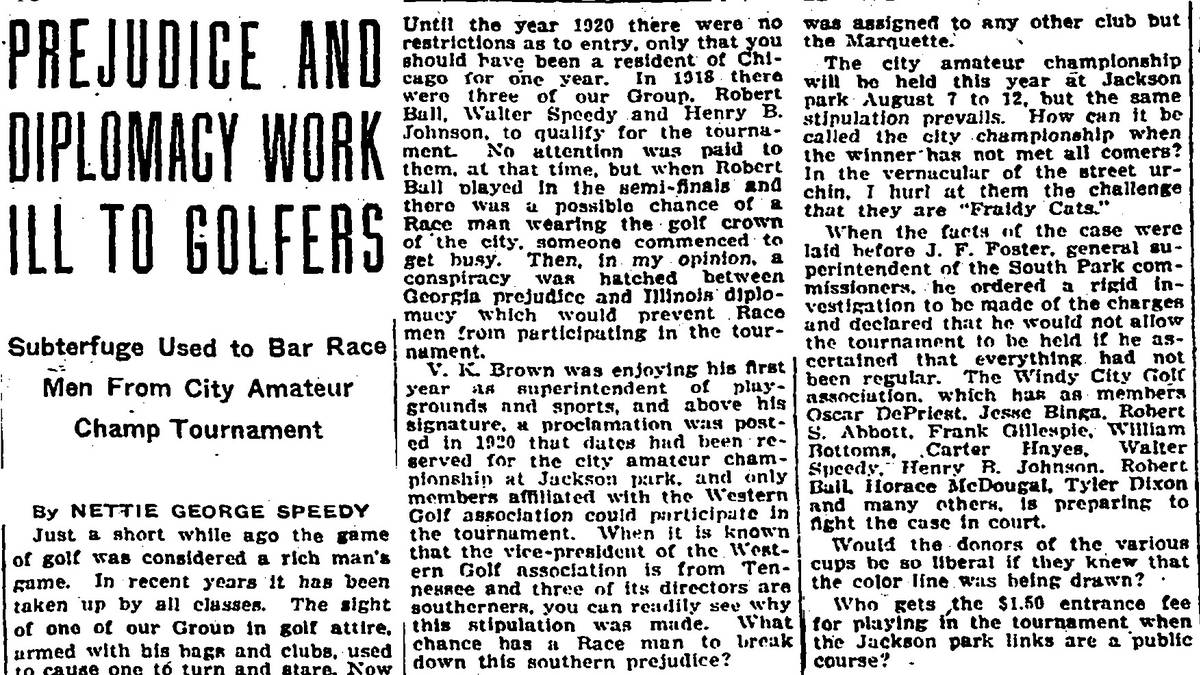
A newspaper article written by Nettie George Speedy in The Chicago Defender in 1922. (The Chicago Defender)

=== Journalism with The Chicago Defender ===
Nettie George Speedy was a prominent journalist with The Chicago Defender, one of the most influential African American newspapers of the early 20th century. She began her career covering a range of topics, including courts, crime, theater, and sports. Speedy quickly gained a reputation as a strong advocate for African Americans, particularly African American women, and used her writing to push for equal representation and opportunities. Her work earned her the nickname “Dean of Women Journalists” by her peers.

Speedy became a trailblazer in 1926 when she was honored at a banquet for the Chicago Press Club, where she was the only woman among other prominent journalists. Her contributions to The Chicago Defender included a number of influential columns, such as "Scrapbook of Doers," which celebrated the accomplishments of African American women. She continued writing for the newspaper for 14 years until she took temporary leave in 1927 due to health issues.

=== Advocacy for African Americans in golf ===
Speedy was an avid golfer and a pioneer in promoting the sport among African Americans. Her influence extended beyond journalism, as she encouraged African American men and women to take up golf at a time when the sport was largely segregated and inaccessible to Black communities. In April 1918, she wrote a passionate editorial urging women to embrace golf, praising it as "a game that can be played by people of all ages, sizes, and genders" with both health and social benefits.

In the early 1920s, Speedy and her husband, Walter Speedy, played in Chicago-area tournaments, facing racial discrimination but persisting in their advocacy. She documented these experiences in her columns, often highlighting the obstacles that African American golfers faced. In 1922, she wrote about how racial prejudice limited opportunities for African Americans in competitive golf. Despite these challenges, Speedy continued to promote the sport, eventually co-founding the Chicago Women’s Golf Club in 1937, which became one of the leading Black women's social organizations in the city. In 1956, the club became a United States Golf Association (USGA) Member Club, allowing its members to compete in USGA tournaments.

=== Community leadership and feminist advocacy ===
Speedy was also active in community organizations that supported African American women. She founded the Xenias club in 1929 with the motto "Fine Womanhood," aiming to mentor women and young girls in career development. The club was exclusive, with only twelve members allowed, and encouraged women to explore professional paths like journalism.

Throughout her career, Speedy consistently highlighted the achievements of African American women. She was a feminist advocate who used her platform to showcase the contributions of Black women and challenge societal norms. Her columns, "Scrapbook of Doers" and the "Woman's Page," celebrated women's accomplishments and offered guidance on issues facing Black women in Chicago.

After a brief retirement in 1927, Speedy returned to journalism and joined The Metropolitan Post, a newly launched African American newspaper, in 1938. Her column, “Women and Their Activities,” focused on the community achievements and social issues that affected African American women.

Speedy’s dedication to community work continued throughout her life. She was involved in organizing social programs and funding athletic clubs in Chicago, such as the Cynco Athletic Club in 1933.

== Personal Life and Family ==
Nettie and her husband Walter Speedy were active participants in Chicago’s social and athletic communities. She was the first woman to become a trustee at Lane College in Tennessee, reflecting her influence and commitment to advancing educational opportunities.

== Death and legacy ==
Speedy died on July 7, 1957, in Hardin County, Ohio, and was buried at the same cemetery as her parents, Ferncliff Cemetery, in Springfield, Ohio.
