= Antioch Christian Church (Kansas City, Missouri) =

Historic church in Missouri, United States

- U.S. National Register of Historic Places
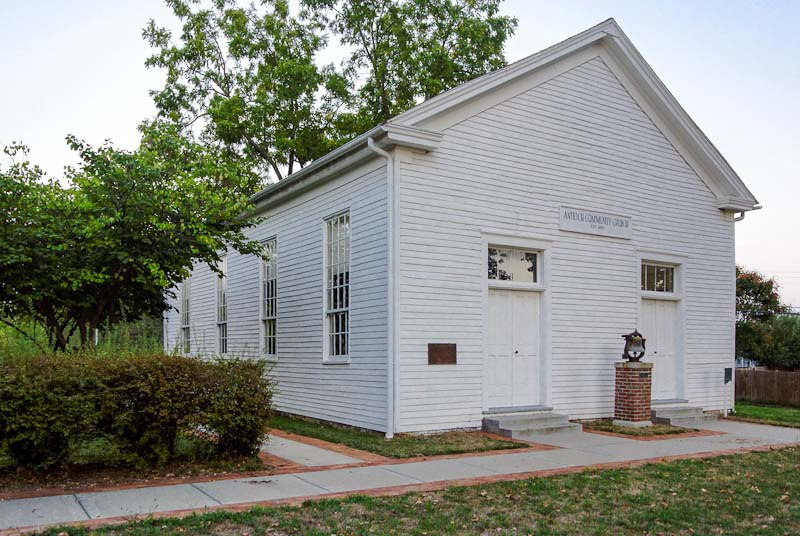

- Location within Missouri Location within the United States
- Location: 4805 NE Antioch Rd., Kansas City, Missouri
- Coordinates: 39°10′53″N 94°32′52″W
- Area: less than one acre
- Built: 1859
- Architect: Ricketts, Ben
- NRHP reference No.: 79001358
- Added to NRHP: April 2, 1979

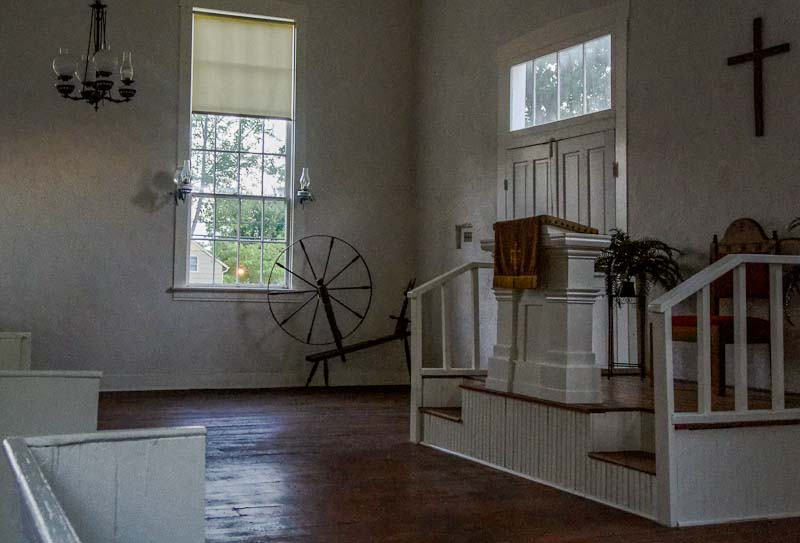
Interior view

Antioch Christian Church is a historic church located at 4805 NE Antioch Road in Kansas City, Missouri. It was built in 1859, and is a one-story, frame building sheathed in clapboard siding. It has a front gable roof and measures approximately 33 feet wide and 51 feet, 6 inches, deep. It was moved to its present location in 1968.

== History ==
The church was founded in 1853 by evangelist Moses E. Lard. Its sanctuary was built in 1859. The congregation used the original sanctuary until 1957, and it still uses it for weddings and other events.

The church was listed on the National Register of Historic Places in 1979.
