= Bloomingdale, Kentucky =

Bloomingdale
- Unincorporated community
- Location within the state of Kentucky Bloomingdale (the United States)
- Coordinates: 37°53′13″N 84°7′37″W
- Country: United States
- State: Kentucky
- County: Clark
- Elevation: 633 ft (193 m)
- Time zone: UTC-6 (Central (CST))
  - Summer (DST): UTC-5 (CST)
- GNIS feature ID: 507526

Bloomingdale is an unincorporated community in Clark County, Kentucky, United States. The community is part of the Lexington–Fayette Metropolitan Statistical Area.
