= Clark County Court House (Kentucky) =

- Clark County Courthouse
- U.S. National Register of Historic Places
- U.S. Historic district – Contributing property
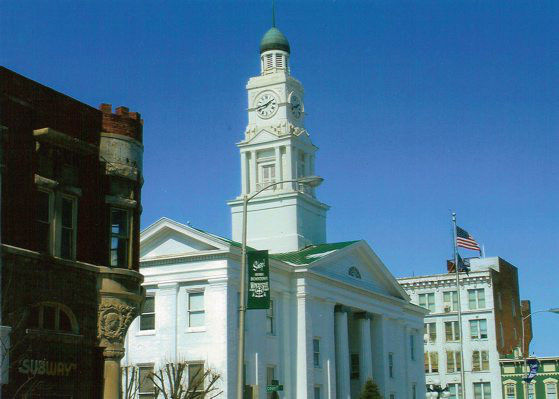
- Clark County Court House, Winchester, KY

- Location within Kentucky Location within the United States
- Location: Winchester, Kentucky; United States
- Coordinates: 37°59′34″N 84°10′41″W
- Built: 1855
- Architect: John McMurtry
- Architectural style: Greek Revival
- Part of: Winchester Downtown Commercial District (ID82002681)
- NRHP reference No.: 74000858

Significant dates
- Added to NRHP: August 7, 1974
- Designated CP: April 28, 1982

The Clark County Court House is a Greek Revival courthouse in downtown Winchester, Kentucky, United States.

Built in 1853, it is the fourth building on this site, and still houses the Circuit Courtroom and Family Courtroom for the Administrative Office of the Courts.

The building was added to the National Register of Historic Places in 1974.

It is the centerpiece of the Winchester Downtown Commercial District, also NRHP-listed.

== See also ==
- Kerr Building: also a contributing building to the historic district
- National Register of Historic Places listings in Clark County, Kentucky
