= Antioch Christian Church (Winchester, Kentucky) =

Historic church in Kentucky, United States

- U.S. National Register of Historic Places
- Location within Kentucky Location within the United States
- Nearest city: Winchester, Kentucky
- Coordinates: 37°54′28″N 84°10′6″W
- Built: 1834
- MPS: Clark County MRA
- NRHP reference No.: 79003566
- Added to NRHP: August 1, 1979

The Antioch Christian Church in Winchester, Kentucky is a historic church. It was built in 1834 and added to the National Register in 1979.

It was built as a stone, one-story, two-entrance church. It was later converted to a barn with a gambrel roof.

== See also ==
- National Register of Historic Places listings in Kentucky
