= Oakwood Estate =

Historic house in Kentucky, United States

- Alpheus Lewis House
- U.S. National Register of Historic Places
- Location within Kentucky Location within the United States
- Nearest city: Winchester, Kentucky
- Coordinates: 38°4′32″N 84°6′54″W
- Built: 1820
- MPS: Clark County MRA
- NRHP reference No.: 79003590
- Added to NRHP: August 1, 1979

The Oakwood Estate is a house in Winchester, Kentucky. It was listed on the National Register of Historic Places in 1979 as Alpheus Lewis House. It is a one-story home on a raised basement, with Greek Revival details.

The Oakwood house, on the Lewis Estate, has a history that dates from the ante-bellum era. The house is on the banks of Stoner Creek, about some miles off of Wades Mill Rd.

At the time the house was built, it was home to Alpheus Lewis Sr., his wife and nine children. He was born in 1799. His father was a veteran of the Revolutionary War and a member of the House of Burgesses and acquired 3,000 acres (12 km^{2}) of land which he eventually divided among his sons. Alpheus built his house, which he later named Oakwood. He created a wine business known as "A. Lewis and Sons". Lewis' son, Alpheus ("Ack") Lewis Jr's time in the Civil War, made Lewis and his home well known in Kentucky.

The condition of Oakwood today is deteriorating with major instabilities in the structure. The backyard however may still have a rail fence made completely of stone, a rarity. Behind it are the graves of Alpheus Lewis Sr. and his wife Theodosia.
