= Becknerville, Kentucky =

Unincorporated town in Kentucky, US

- Unincorporated community
- Location within Kentucky Location within the United States
- Coordinates: 37°57′59″N 84°16′46″W
- Country: United States
- State: Kentucky
- County: Clark
- Elevation: 961 ft (293 m)
- Time zone: UTC-5 (Eastern (EST))
  - Summer (DST): UTC-4 (EDT)
- ZIP code: 40391
- Area code: 859
- GNIS feature ID: 507471

Becknerville is an unincorporated town in southern Clark County, Kentucky, United States. It is situated along Kentucky Route 1923 (Waterworks Road/Combs Ferry Road). It is part of the Lexington–Fayette Metropolitan Statistical Area.

The town was originally named Hayden's Corner after local landowner Samuel Hayden. The town was later renamed to Becknerville, after judge and politician William Morgan Beckner. The Becknerville post office was opened in 1884 and closed in 1904.
