= Museum board =

Museum board is a type of paperboard. Specifically, it is a white, acid free cardboard that bends fairly easily in one direction but is fairly stiff in the other, due to the grain of the paper fibers.
