= Goffs Corner, Kentucky =

Goffs Corner
- Unincorporated community
- Location within the state of Kentucky Goffs Corner (the United States)
- Coordinates: 37°55′43″N 84°00′24″W
- Country: United States
- State: Kentucky
- County: Clark
- Elevation: 801 ft (244 m)
- Time zone: UTC-5 (Eastern (EST))
  - Summer (DST): UTC-4 (EST)
- GNIS feature ID: 508104

Goffs Corner is an unincorporated community located in Clark County, Kentucky, United States.
