= Winchester, Kentucky =

- City
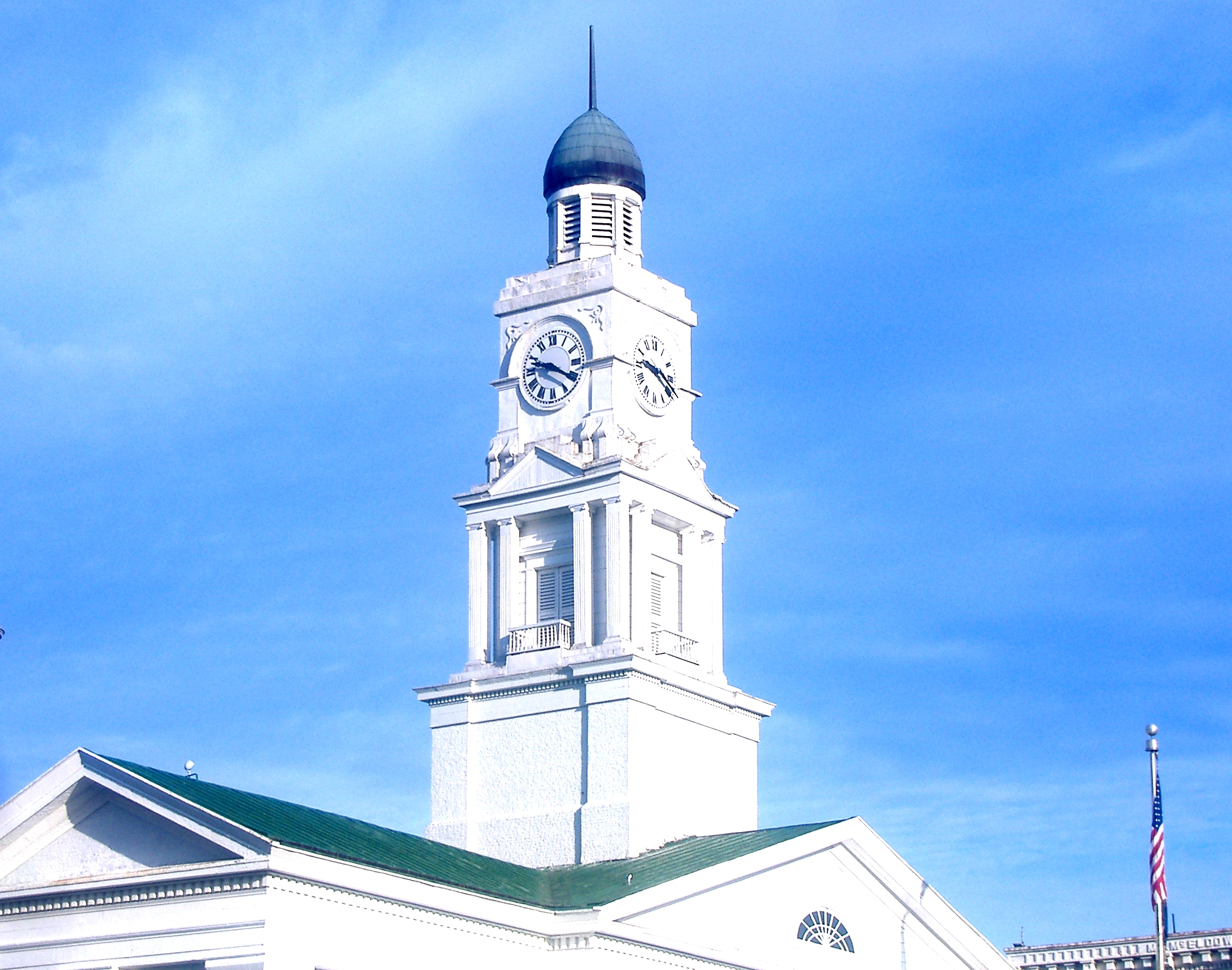
- Main Street
- Motto: Rich in History and Ready for the Future
- Location of Winchester in Clark County, Kentucky.
- Coordinates: 37°59′41″N 84°11′3″W
- Country: United States
- State: Kentucky
- County: Clark

Area
  - Total: 9.25 sq mi (23.97 km^{2})
  - Land: 9.15 sq mi (23.70 km^{2})
  - Water: 0.10 sq mi (0.27 km^{2})
- Elevation: 994 ft (303 m)

Population (2020)
  - Total: 19,134
  - Estimate (2022): 19,142
  - Density: 2,090.9/sq mi (807.31/km^{2})
- Time zone: UTC−5 (Eastern (EST))
  - Summer (DST): UTC−4 (EDT)
- ZIP codes: 40391-40392
- Area code: 859
- FIPS code: 21-83676
- GNIS feature ID: 0506924
- Website: winchesterky.com

Winchester is a city in and the county seat of Clark County, Kentucky, United States. The population was 19,134 at the 2020 census. It is part of the Lexington-Fayette, KY Metropolitan Statistical Area. Winchester is located roughly halfway between Lexington and Mt. Sterling. Winchester is a home-rule class city under Kentucky law.

== History ==
It was named after Winchester, Virginia.

== Geography ==
Winchester is located northwest of the center of Clark County, 18 miles (29 km) east of Lexington and 15 miles (24 km) west of Mt. Sterling. Kentucky Route 1958 (Bypass Road) is an outer loop around the town. Kentucky Route 627 (Boonesborough Road) leads towards Richmond, 21 miles (34 km) to the south and Paris to the north. U.S. Route 60 (Winchester-Lexington Road/Lexington Avenue) runs through downtown Winchester. Interstate 64 passes through the northern part of the city, with access from exits 94 and 96. The Mountain Parkway turns off I-64 just northeast of Winchester and leads 75 miles (121 km) east to Salyersville.

According to the United States Census Bureau, Winchester has a total area of 7.9 square miles (20.4 km^{2}), of which 7.8 square miles (20.3 km^{2}) is land and 0.04 square miles (0.1 km^{2}), or 0.67%, is water.

=== Climate ===
The climate in this area is characterized by hot, humid summers and generally mild to cool winters. According to the Köppen Climate Classification system, Winchester has a humid subtropical climate, abbreviated "Cfa" on climate maps.

== Demographics ==
Historical population
Census	Pop.	Note	%±
1800	130		—
1810	538		313.8%
1830	620		—
1840	1,047		68.9%
1860	1,142		—
1870	1,616		41.5%
1880	2,277		40.9%
1890	4,519		98.5%
1900	5,964		32.0%
1910	7,156		20.0%
1920	8,333		16.4%
1930	8,233		−1.2%
1940	8,594		4.4%
1950	9,226		7.4%
1960	10,187		10.4%
1970	13,402		31.6%
1980	15,216		13.5%
1990	15,799		3.8%
2000	16,724		5.9%
2010	18,368		9.8%
2020	19,134		4.2%
2024 (est.)	19,413		1.5%
U.S. Decennial Census

=== 2020 census ===
As of the 2020 census, Winchester had a population of 19,134. The median age was 38.0 years. 23.0% of residents were under the age of 18 and 15.3% of residents were 65 years of age or older. For every 100 females there were 92.4 males, and for every 100 females age 18 and over there were 88.2 males age 18 and over.

99.9% of residents lived in urban areas, while 0.1% lived in rural areas.

There were 8,020 households in Winchester, of which 30.1% had children under the age of 18 living in them. Of all households, 36.9% were married-couple households, 19.7% were households with a male householder and no spouse or partner present, and 34.1% were households with a female householder and no spouse or partner present. About 32.3% of all households were made up of individuals and 12.8% had someone living alone who was 65 years of age or older.

There were 8,758 housing units, of which 8.4% were vacant. The homeowner vacancy rate was 2.4% and the rental vacancy rate was 7.8%.

Racial composition as of the 2020 census
Race	Number	Percent
White	15,974	83.5%
Black or African American	1,394	7.3%
American Indian and Alaska Native	66	0.3%
Asian	147	0.8%
Native Hawaiian and Other Pacific Islander	15	0.1%
Some other race	518	2.7%
Two or more races	1,020	5.3%
Hispanic or Latino (of any race)	1,057	5.5%

=== 2000 census ===
As of the 2000 census, there were 16,724 people, 6,907 households, and 4,620 families residing in the city. The population density was 2,187.6 per square mile (844.6/km^{2}). There were 7,400 housing units at an average density of 968.0 per square mile (373.7/km^{2}). The racial makeup of the city was 88.94% White, 8.83% African American, 0.22% Native American, 0.25% Asian, 0.01% Pacific Islander, 0.81% from other races, and 0.94% from two or more races. Hispanic or Latino of any race were 1.60% of the population.

There were 6,907 households, out of which 31.4% had children under the age of 18 living with them, 47.0% were married couples living together, 16.4% had a female householder with no husband present, and 33.1% were non-families. 28.5% of all households were made up of individuals, and 12.6% had someone living alone who was 65 years of age or older. The average household size was 2.39 and the average family size was 2.93.

In the city, the population was spread out, with 24.9% under the age of 18, 9.9% from 18 to 24, 30.0% from 25 to 44, 21.1% from 45 to 64, and 14.0% who were 65 years of age or older. The median age was 35 years. For every 100 females, there were 88.7 males. For every 100 females age 18 and over, there were 84.4 males.

The median income for a household in the city was $31,254, and the median income for a family was $36,797. Males had a median income of $31,295 versus $21,747 for females. The per capita income for the city was $15,611. About 13.1% of families and 15.5% of the population were below the poverty line, including 21.1% of those under age 18 and 14.4% of those age 65 or over.

== Economy ==
Winchester's top 10 employers in manufacturing, service, and technology (2016)
Employer	Number of employees	Year established in Winchester
Fayette Electrical Service, Inc.	105	2019
Catalent Pharma	400	1992
East Kentucky Power Cooperative	300	1941
General Dynamics Information Technology	208	2014
Infiltrator Water Technologies	182	1986
Leggett & Platt	250	1910
Save-A-Lot Distribution Center	210	1998
The Freeman Corporation	223	1913
Walle Corporation	140	1991
Winchester Farms Dairy	183	1982

=== Small business ===
Ale-8-One, a Kentucky-specific brand of soft drink, has been bottled in Winchester since 1926.

== Arts and culture ==
=== Beer Cheese Festival ===
Winchester is home to the Beer Cheese Festival held annually in June. Beer Cheese was developed in Clark County near Winchester in the 1940s.

=== Historic sites ===
- Bluegrass Heritage Museum
- Clark County Court House
- Clark Mansion (Gov. Clark House)
- Indian old fields
- Kerr Building
- Leeds Theater
- Oakwood Estate
- Old Providence Church
- Winchester Opera House

== Education ==
Oliver School (1892–1969) was in Winchester and served as both a high school campus, and later an elementary school campus for Black students. The former Oliver School campus is listed on the National Register of Historic Places since 2004. After racial integration in 1956, the Oliver High School students were bussed to Winchester High School, which had been an all-White school prior.

=== High school ===
Winchester students attend George Rogers Clark High School, located southwest of Winchester in Clark County.

=== Higher education ===
Winchester has been home to several higher education establishments. Kentucky Wesleyan College was located in the city from 1890 to 1954. When Kentucky Wesleyan left, the local Churches of Christ organized Southeastern Christian College on the former Kentucky Wesleyan campus. After Southeastern Christian College folded in 1979, the campus was preserved as a public park. Today, Clark County is home to the Winchester Campus of Bluegrass Community and Technical College.

=== Public library ===
Winchester has a lending library, the Clark County Public Library.

== Transportation ==
Interstate 64 runs east–west through the northern part of Winchester. U.S. Route 60 runs east–west through Winchester. Kentucky Route 627 runs north–south through Winchester.

Blue Grass Airport, 29 miles to the west, in the western part of Lexington, is one of the busiest commercial airports in the state.

The Louisville and Nashville Railroad had run trains east–west and north–south through Winchester. The last L&N passenger train was an unnamed Cincinnati - Atlanta remnant of the former Cincinnati - Jacksonville Flamingo; it was discontinued on March 7, 1968.

== Notable people ==
- Armstead M. Alexander (1834–1892), congressman from Missouri
- Chilton Allan (1786–1858), congressman from Kentucky
- Yeremiah Bell, safety for the New York Jets NFL team
- Rex Burkhead, running back for the Houston Texans NFL Team
- George French Ecton, second African-American state legislator in Illinois
- John E. Fryer, psychiatrist whose speech in 1972 as "Dr. Henry Anonymous" helped to get homosexuality removed as a mental disease from the American Psychiatric Association's Diagnostic and Statistical Manual
- Matt Ginter, Professional Baseball 1999–2010 (11 years)
- William Harrow (1822–1871), Union general in the Civil War
- Joel Tanner Hart (1810–1877), sculptor
- Joseph Jackson (screenwriter), screenwriter and publicist.
- Preston Knowles, basketball player for the University of Louisville
- Homer Ledford (1927–2006), instrument maker and bluegrass musician
- Matt Long, TV's "Jack & Bobby", "Mad Men", "Helix".
- Nettie George Speedy (1878–1957), journalist of Chicago Defender, founder of Chicago Women's Golf Club, the first woman to sit on the trustee board of Lane College, and the Pioneer of African American golf.
- Claude Sullivan, sports broadcaster
- Allen Tate (1899–1979), poet associated with the Agrarians, a group of Southern poets, and most noted for "Ode to the Confederate Dead"
- Helen Thomas, White House press correspondent
- Frank L. Winn, U.S. Army major general
- John S. Winn, U.S. Army brigadier general

== In popular culture ==
A 2018 episode of The Dead Files was filmed in Winchester.

== Sister cities ==
Winchester has two sister cities, as designated by Sister Cities International:

- Ibarra, Imbabura, Ecuador
- Etawah, Uttar Pradesh, India
