= Clark County, Kentucky =

County in Kentucky, United States

- County
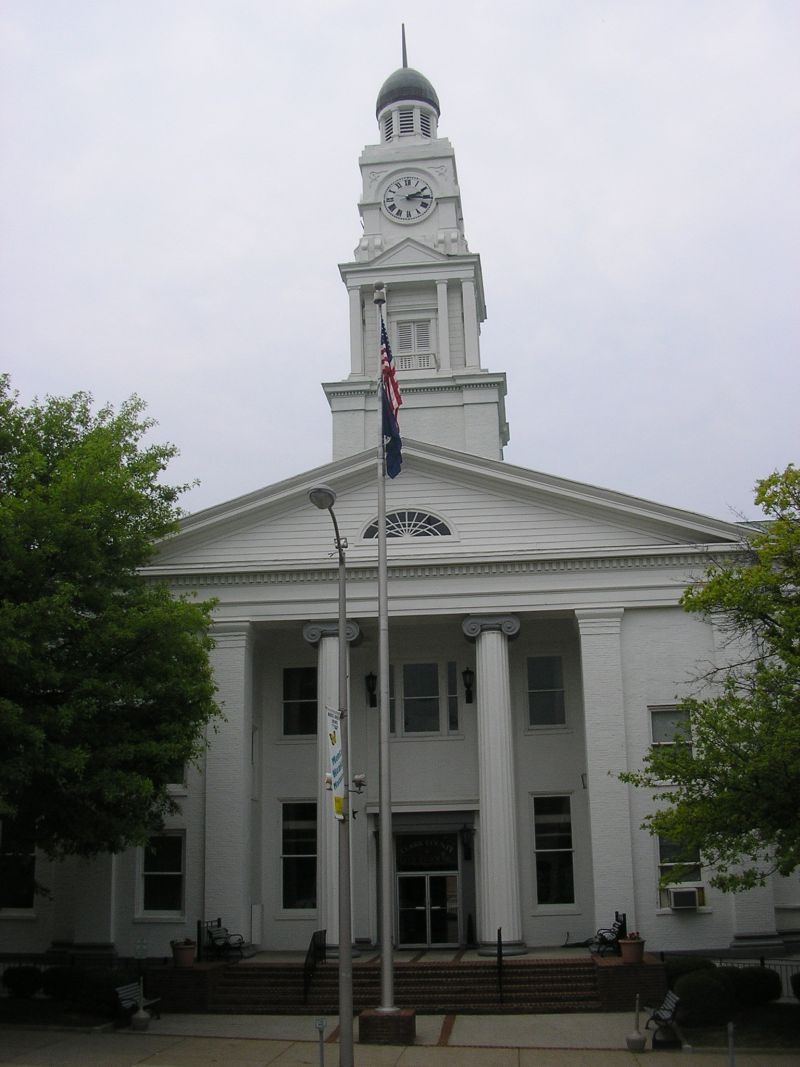
- Clark County Courthouse in Winchester

- Location within the U.S. state of Kentucky
- Coordinates: 37°58′N 84°09′W
- Country: United States
- State: Kentucky
- Founded: 1792
- Named for: George Rogers Clark
- Seat: Winchester
- Largest city: Winchester

Government
  - Judge/Executive: R. J. Palmer (D)

Area
  - Total: 255 sq mi (660 km^{2})
  - Land: 252 sq mi (650 km^{2})
  - Water: 2.7 sq mi (7.0 km^{2}) 1.1%

Population (2020)
  - Total: 36,972
  - Estimate (2025): 37,888 ▲
  - Density: 147/sq mi (56.6/km^{2})
- Time zone: UTC−5 (Eastern)
  - Summer (DST): UTC−4 (EDT)
- Congressional district: 6th
- Website: www.clarkcoky.com

Clark County is a county located in the U.S. state of Kentucky. As of the 2020 census, the population was 36,972. Its county seat is Winchester. The county was created in 1792 from Bourbon and Fayette counties and is named for Revolutionary War hero George Rogers Clark. Clark County is part of the Lexington-Fayette, KY Metropolitan Statistical Area.

== History ==
European settlement is known in this area as early as 1753. Many pioneers traveled through nearby Fort Boonesborough (alternatively known as Fort Boonesboro) in Madison County, Kentucky, before establishing permanent settlements in Clark County. At least nineteen pioneer stations (settlements) are believed to have been established in the area during the American Revolution. These included Strode's Station (1779), near Winchester; McGee's Station (ca. 1780), near Becknerville; Holder's Station (1781), on Lower Howard's Creek; and Boyle's Station (ca. 1785), one mile South of Strode's Station. Among the early settlers was a group of forty Baptist families led by Capt. William Bush, who settled on Lower Howard's Creek in 1775. In 1793 they erected the Old Stone Meeting House. Another early group founded the Tracy settlement, erecting a church building in the 1790s that survived into the early 20th century.

When the indigenous threat ended, commercial and agricultural enterprises began. Wharfs for loading flatboats were located along the Kentucky River and its tributaries. In the early 19th century, Clark County farmers began importing European livestock. Industries such as distilleries and mills thrived all through the county until 1820, when they began to be concentrated around Winchester.

Clark County began in 1785 as Bourbon County, Virginia, when it was created from Fayette County, Kentucky (also then in Virginia). It was much larger in area than present-day Bourbon County, as its original territory is now divided among Bracken, Boone, Campbell, Clark, Estill, Fleming, Floyd, Greenup, Harrison, Kenton, Mason, Montgomery, Lewis, Nicholas, Pendleton, Powell, and Robertson. Bourbon whiskey's name evolved from Bourbon County.

Notable residents of early Clark County were Gov. Charles Scott (1808–12), Gov. James Clark (1836–39), Jane Lampton, the mother of Mark Twain, and sculptor Joel T. Hart.

The Civil War divided the county, and about 1,000 of its men joined either the Confederate or Union forces. Confederate General John Hunt Morgan led his Confederate cavalry through the county on raids in both 1862 and 1864.

The Elizabethtown, Lexington & Big Sandy Railroad reached Clark County in 1873, followed by the Kentucky Central in 1881, and the Kentucky Union (later abandoned) in 1883. The railroads helped make Winchester a transportation, commercial, and educational center, and gave rise to small service communities such as Hedges Station, six miles east of Winchester, and Ford, a once-prosperous mill town on the Kentucky River.

A number of agricultural changes occurred in the postbellum years through World War II. When Clark County shorthorn cattle were not able to compete with the vast numbers of western cattle being hauled to market by the railroads, several county fortunes were lost and many farmers turned towards burley tobacco as a substitute. Hemp, which was grown to make rope, suffered from foreign competition and vanished as a cash crop around World War I. The crop was brought back during World War II and a processing plant was built in the county. When the war ended, so did the revival of hemp.

In the 1950s and 1960s, industry began moving to the county, mostly around Winchester, aided by the completion of I-64 and the Mountain Parkway, which by the mid-1960s formed a junction near Winchester. By 1986 manufacturing positions accounted for 25 percent of the employed labor force while another 25 percent was employed in other counties, many in nearby Fayette. The county remains a rich agricultural area, with farms occupying 95 percent of the land.

Clark County is the birthplace of beer cheese, a regional delicacy that is growing in popularity across the country. Winchester hosts the annual Beer Cheese Festival in celebration of this Kentucky original treat.

== Geography ==
According to the United States Census Bureau, the county has a total area of 255 square miles (660 km^{2}), of which 252 square miles (650 km^{2}) is land and 2.7 square miles (7.0 km^{2}) (1.1%) is water. The topography of the county is gently rolling. Tobacco is a major farm crop, and livestock are also raised there. Water sources include the Kentucky River, Red River, Lulbegrud Creek, and Boone's Creek. Lulbegrud Creek is named for Lorbrulgrud, the capital city of Brobdingnag, the land of giant people in Jonathan Swift's Gulliver's Travels.

=== Adjacent counties ===
- Bourbon County (north)
- Montgomery County (northeast)
- Powell County (southeast)
- Estill County (southeast)
- Madison County (southwest)
- Fayette County (northwest)

== Demographics ==
Historical population
| Census | Pop. | Note | %± |
|---|---|---|---|
| 1800 | 7,653 | | — |
| 1810 | 11,519 | | 50.5% |
| 1820 | 11,449 | | −0.6% |
| 1830 | 13,051 | | 14.0% |
| 1840 | 10,802 | | −17.2% |
| 1850 | 12,683 | | 17.4% |
| 1860 | 11,484 | | −9.5% |
| 1870 | 10,882 | | −5.2% |
| 1880 | 12,115 | | 11.3% |
| 1890 | 15,434 | | 27.4% |
| 1900 | 16,694 | | 8.2% |
| 1910 | 17,987 | | 7.7% |
| 1920 | 17,901 | | −0.5% |
| 1930 | 17,640 | | −1.5% |
| 1940 | 17,988 | | 2.0% |
| 1950 | 18,898 | | 5.1% |
| 1960 | 21,075 | | 11.5% |
| 1970 | 24,090 | | 14.3% |
| 1980 | 28,322 | | 17.6% |
| 1990 | 29,496 | | 4.1% |
| 2000 | 33,144 | | 12.4% |
| 2010 | 35,613 | | 7.4% |
| 2020 | 36,972 | | 3.8% |
| 2025 (est.) | 37,888 | ▲ | 2.5% |
U.S. Decennial Census; 1790-1960 1900-1990; 1990-2000 2010-2020

=== 2020 census ===
As of the 2020 census, the county had a population of 36,972. The median age was 41.5 years. 22.4% of residents were under the age of 18 and 17.9% of residents were 65 years of age or older. For every 100 females there were 95.3 males, and for every 100 females age 18 and over there were 91.5 males age 18 and over.

The racial makeup of the county was 88.1% White, 4.5% Black or African American, 0.3% American Indian and Alaska Native, 0.6% Asian, 0.0% Native Hawaiian and Pacific Islander, 1.9% from some other race, and 4.7% from two or more races. Hispanic or Latino residents of any race comprised 4.0% of the population.

71.0% of residents lived in urban areas, while 29.0% lived in rural areas.

There were 14,917 households in the county, of which 30.6% had children under the age of 18 living with them and 27.5% had a female householder with no spouse or partner present. About 26.9% of all households were made up of individuals and 11.5% had someone living alone who was 65 years of age or older.

There were 16,116 housing units, of which 7.4% were vacant. Among occupied housing units, 65.6% were owner-occupied and 34.4% were renter-occupied. The homeowner vacancy rate was 1.9% and the rental vacancy rate was 7.1%.

=== 2000 census ===
As of the census of 2000, there were 33,144 people, 13,015 households, and 9,553 families residing in the county. The population density was 130 per square mile (50/km^{2}). There were 13,749 housing units at an average density of 54 per square mile (21/km^{2}). The racial makeup of the county was 93.60% White, 4.77% Black or African American, 0.17% Native American, 0.20% Asian, 0.01% Pacific Islander, 0.53% from other races, and 0.71% from two or more races. 1.19% of the population were Hispanic or Latino of any race.

There were 13,015 households, out of which 33.40% had children under the age of 18 living with them, 57.90% were married couples living together, 12.10% had a female householder with no husband present, and 26.60% were non-families. 22.80% of all households were made up of individuals, and 9.40% had someone living alone who was 65 years of age or older. The average household size was 2.51 and the average family size was 2.95.

In the county, the population was spread out, with 24.80% under the age of 18, 8.10% from 18 to 24, 30.30% from 25 to 44, 24.30% from 45 to 64, and 12.40% who were 65 years of age or older. The median age was 37 years. For every 100 females, there were 93.60 males. For every 100 females age 18 and over, there were 89.80 males.

The median income for a household in the county was $39,946, and the median income for a family was $45,647. Males had a median income of $35,774 versus $24,298 for females. The per capita income for the county was $19,170. About 8.40% of families and 10.60% of the population were below the poverty line, including 14.60% of those under age 18 and 11.70% of those age 65 or over.

== Politics ==
United States presidential election results for Clark County, Kentucky
| Year | Republican | | Democratic | | Third party(ies) | |
| Year | No. | % | No. | % | No. | % |
|---|---|---|---|---|---|---|
| 1912 | 1,056 | 26.07% | 2,321 | 57.31% | 673 | 16.62% |
| 1916 | 1,731 | 39.45% | 2,620 | 59.71% | 37 | 0.84% |
| 1920 | 3,105 | 38.88% | 4,846 | 60.67% | 36 | 0.45% |
| 1924 | 2,703 | 40.78% | 3,857 | 58.18% | 69 | 1.04% |
| 1928 | 3,495 | 50.25% | 3,460 | 49.75% | 0 | 0.00% |
| 1932 | 1,981 | 28.56% | 4,920 | 70.93% | 35 | 0.50% |
| 1936 | 2,246 | 33.73% | 4,396 | 66.02% | 17 | 0.26% |
| 1940 | 2,136 | 34.87% | 3,970 | 64.82% | 19 | 0.31% |
| 1944 | 1,929 | 34.67% | 3,608 | 64.85% | 27 | 0.49% |
| 1948 | 1,508 | 30.06% | 3,292 | 65.63% | 216 | 4.31% |
| 1952 | 2,592 | 41.73% | 3,620 | 58.27% | 0 | 0.00% |
| 1956 | 3,030 | 45.48% | 3,609 | 54.16% | 24 | 0.36% |
| 1960 | 3,317 | 52.31% | 3,024 | 47.69% | 0 | 0.00% |
| 1964 | 2,019 | 32.37% | 4,205 | 67.42% | 13 | 0.21% |
| 1968 | 2,698 | 39.63% | 2,385 | 35.03% | 1,725 | 25.34% |
| 1972 | 4,506 | 68.43% | 2,020 | 30.68% | 59 | 0.90% |
| 1976 | 3,114 | 40.09% | 4,575 | 58.90% | 79 | 1.02% |
| 1980 | 4,302 | 44.42% | 5,071 | 52.36% | 312 | 3.22% |
| 1984 | 6,130 | 62.82% | 3,595 | 36.84% | 33 | 0.34% |
| 1988 | 5,329 | 55.38% | 4,252 | 44.19% | 41 | 0.43% |
| 1992 | 4,625 | 40.16% | 4,892 | 42.48% | 2,000 | 17.37% |
| 1996 | 4,739 | 43.49% | 4,987 | 45.77% | 1,170 | 10.74% |
| 2000 | 7,297 | 58.50% | 4,918 | 39.43% | 258 | 2.07% |
| 2004 | 9,540 | 62.28% | 5,661 | 36.96% | 116 | 0.76% |
| 2008 | 9,664 | 61.84% | 5,749 | 36.79% | 215 | 1.38% |
| 2012 | 9,931 | 64.42% | 5,228 | 33.91% | 257 | 1.67% |
| 2016 | 10,710 | 66.09% | 4,706 | 29.04% | 789 | 4.87% |
| 2020 | 11,811 | 65.11% | 6,004 | 33.10% | 324 | 1.79% |
| 2024 | 11,950 | 66.82% | 5,639 | 31.53% | 296 | 1.66% |

The county voted "No" on 2022 Kentucky Amendment 2, an anti-abortion ballot measure, by 51% to 49%, and backed Donald Trump with 65% of the vote to Joe Biden's 33% in the 2020 presidential election.

=== Elected officials ===
Elected officials as of January 3, 2025
| U.S. House | Andy Barr (R) | KY 6 |
| Ky. Senate | Greg Elkins (R) | 28 |
| Ky. House | Ryan Dotson (R) | 73 |

== Communities ==
=== Cities ===
- Winchester (county seat)

=== Unincorporated communities ===
- Becknerville
- Bloomingdale
- Colby
- Combs Ferry
- Ford
- Goffs Corner
- Lyndale
- Pilot View
- Trapp

== See also ==
- National Register of Historic Places listings in Clark County, Kentucky
- Eskippakithiki: the last known Native American settlement in the state of Kentucky.
