= Roy Kidd =

American football player and coach (1931–2023)

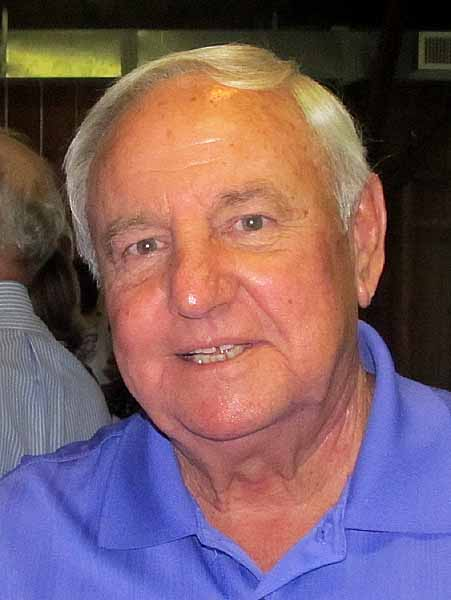
- Kidd in 2011

Biographical details
- Born: December 4, 1931; Corbin, Kentucky, U.S.
- Died: September 12, 2023 (aged 91); Richmond, Kentucky, U.S.

Playing career
- 1950–1953: Eastern Kentucky
- Position: Quarterback

Coaching career (HC unless noted)
- 1954: Eastern Kentucky (SA)
- 1956–1960: Madison-Model HS (KY)
- 1961: Madison HS (KY)
- 1962: Morehead State (assistant)
- 1963: Eastern Kentucky (assistant)
- 1964–2002: Eastern Kentucky

Administrative career (AD unless noted)
- 1991–1995: Eastern Kentucky

Head coaching record
- Overall: 314–124–8 (college); 54–11–1 (high school)
- Bowls: 1–0
- Tournaments: 0–1 (NCAA D-II playoffs); 15–15 (NCAA D-I-AA playoffs)

Accomplishments and honors

Championships
- 2 NCAA D-I-AA National (1979, 1982); 16 OVC (1967–1968, 1974, 1976, 1981–1984, 1986–1988, 1990–1991, 1993–1994, 1997)

Awards
- 10× OVC Coach of the Year (1967, 1974, 1976, 1981–1983, 1988, 1990–1991, 1997)
- College Football Hall of Fame; Inducted in 2003 (profile)

Roy Lee Kidd (December 4, 1931 – September 12, 2023) was an American collegiate football league player and coach. He served as the head coach at Eastern Kentucky University from 1964 to 2002, compiling a record of 314–124–8. Kidd's Eastern Kentucky Colonels won NCAA Division I-AA Football Championships in 1979 and 1982 and were runners-up in 1980 and 1981. His 314 career victories are second-most in NCAA Division I-AA/FCS history, trailing only those of Grambling State's Eddie Robinson. Kidd was inducted into the College Football Hall of Fame as a coach in 2003.

== Early life and playing career ==
Kidd was a star football, basketball, and baseball player at Corbin High School in the Whitley County portion of Corbin, Kentucky. At Corbin, Kidd was a basketball teammate of college All-American Frank Selvy. There is a street, Roy Kidd Ave., named in his honor in Corbin. He graduated from Corbin in 1950 after being chosen as a first team All-State football player for the 1949 season by The Courier-Journal of Louisville. Kidd was signed to a football scholarship by Eastern Kentucky State College and played quarterback at the Richmond school from 1950 to 1953. Kidd actually turned down a scholarship to play for Bear Bryant at the University of Kentucky because his favorite sport was baseball and the football coaches at Eastern Kentucky were willing to let him play both sports. Kidd received four varsity letters in football and baseball at Eastern. He established a dozen records as quarterback of the Maroons (each of these has since been tied or broken), was an All-Ohio Valley Conference selection, and was honored as a "Little All-American" choice in 1953. Kidd was also a star center fielder for Eastern, bettering the .300 mark four consecutive seasons. Kidd served as a student assistant on the staff of Glenn Presnell's 1954 Eastern team which went undefeated, won the OVC and lost 7–6 to Omaha in the Tangerine Bowl.

== Coaching career ==
=== Madison-Model ===
In 1955, Kidd was hired as the assistant basketball and head baseball coach at Madison Central High School in Richmond, Kentucky. In August 1956, A. L. Lassiter, the superintendent of Richmond city schools, offered Kidd the position of head football coach at Madison-Model High School. Kidd accepted and spent the next six years as coach of the Royal Purples. Model discontinued its partnership with Madison after the 1960–61 school year and Kidd coached Madison for one season, 1961–62 school year, before moving to the college level.

Kidd took over a Madison-Model program that produced a 23–36–12 record from 1947 to 1955. He led the Purples to a 54–11–1 record from 1956 to 1961. His 54 wins rank him as the third winningest coach in Madison football history behind Lassiter (86 wins in 20 years) and Monty Joe Lovell (77 wins in 11 years). Kidd's .818 winning percentage is the best in Richmond Madison football history. His first team (1956) reeled off nine wins to finish the regular season undefeated and collected the most wins of any Madison team since the sport was initiated at the Richmond high school in 1921.

Under his tutelage, Madison-Model put together a 27-game winning streak (1959–1961) and was not scored upon in 15 consecutive regular season games during that span. They captured three Central Kentucky Conference (CKC) titles, in 1956, 1960 and 1961. The Royal Purples were Recreation Bowl champions in 1957 and 1961. Madison-Model went 11–0 in 1960, but, under a controversial point system, was not awarded a berth in the state playoffs. Kidd was chosen Kentucky High School Coach of the Year in his last season (1961) as his Purples went 13–1. Madison finished as the Class AA state runner-up to Fort Thomas' Highlands High School that season as Kidd's squad fell to the Bluebirds 12–0. Future college and NFL coach, Homer Rice, coached Highlands.

=== Eastern Kentucky ===
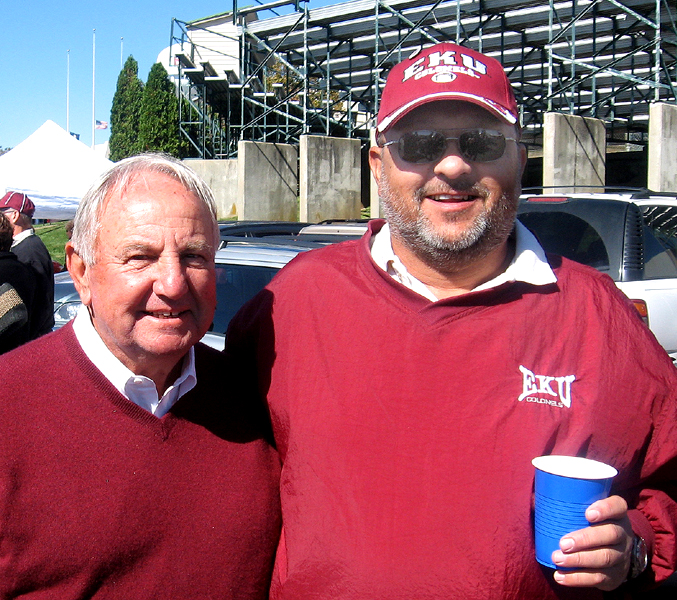
Kidd with a former player

In 1962, he was hired as an assistant coach at Morehead State College. The next year, he ventured back to Richmond to serve as an assistant coach at his alma mater and served under his mentor, Glenn Presnell. After the 1963 season, Presnell retired and Kidd was hired as Eastern's head football coach 1964.

In 1967, Kidd led the Colonels to the first of 16 Ohio Valley Conference titles during his tenure, as well as a victory in the Grantland Rice Bowl over Ball State. After being classified in the new Division I-AA (now Division I FCS) in 1978, EKU and Kidd made appearances in four straight national championship games, winning in 1979 and 1982, and finishing as runner-up in 1980 and 1981. Following the national championships, Kidd's teams never suffered a losing campaign. He led the school to 18 playoff appearances, including a stretch of making the postseason in 16 out of 17 seasons. All told, Kidd led the Colonels to 16 Ohio Valley Conference titles and a national record 17 NCAA Division I-AA playoff appearances. He won the OVC Coach of the Year honor ten times and was twice honored as the NCAA Division I-AA national coach of the year.

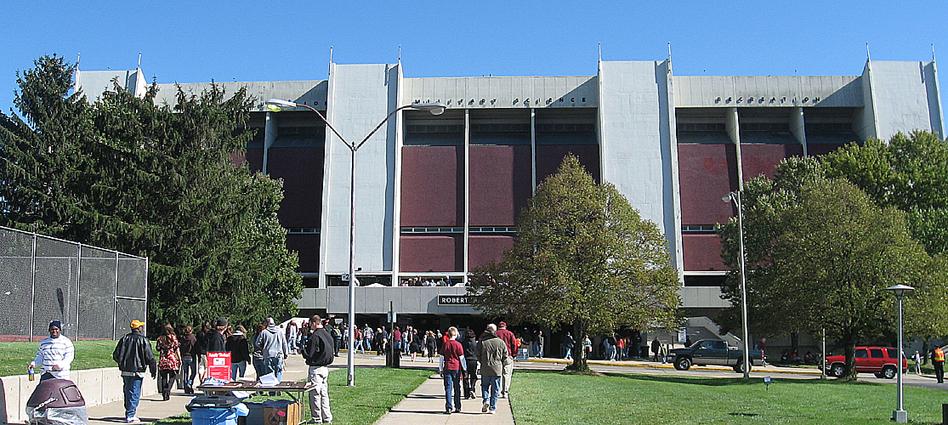
Roy Kidd Stadium

Over the course of his career, Kidd had a record of 314–124–8, a .713 winning percentage. He was inducted into the College Football Hall of Fame in 2003. At retirement, Kidd was the sixth all-time winningest coach in NCAA history with 314 victories. Kidd retired with the most wins for a head coach at the Division I FCS level, with 223, a record now held by Jimmye Laycock. He recorded 37 non-losing seasons, including a streak of 25 straight seasons with a winning record. Kidd coached 55 All-Americans, 202 First Team All-OVC selections and 41 student-athletes who signed National Football League contracts. A member of the OVC and Kentucky Athletics Hall of Fame, the Colonels' stadium was named Roy Kidd Stadium in his honor. The street that fronts the stadium has been renamed "Roy and Sue Kidd Way" in honor of Kidd and his wife, Susan Purcell Kidd.

== Death ==
Roy Kidd died on September 12, 2023, at the age of 91.

== Head coaching record ==
=== College ===
Year	Team	Overall	Conference	Standing	Bowl/playoffs
Eastern Kentucky Maroons/Colonels (Ohio Valley Conference) (1964–2002)
1964	Eastern Kentucky	3–5–1	2–4–1	7th	
1965	Eastern Kentucky	4–4–1	4–2–1	3rd	
1966	Eastern Kentucky	7–3	4–3	T–3rd	
1967	Eastern Kentucky	8–1–2	5–0–2	1st	W Grantland Rice
1968	Eastern Kentucky	8–2	7–0	1st	
1969	Eastern Kentucky	6–4	4–3	T–3rd	
1970	Eastern Kentucky	8–2	5–2	2nd	
1971	Eastern Kentucky	6–4–1	3–4	6th	
1972	Eastern Kentucky	5–6	3–4	5th	
1973	Eastern Kentucky	7–4	4–3	T–3rd	
1974	Eastern Kentucky	8–2	6–1	1st	
1975	Eastern Kentucky	8–2–1	5–2	3rd	
1976	Eastern Kentucky	8–3	6–1	1st	L NCAA Division II Quarterfinal
1977	Eastern Kentucky	5–5	4–3	T–3rd	
1978	Eastern Kentucky	8–2	5–1	2nd	
1979	Eastern Kentucky	11–2	5–1	2nd	W NCAA Division I-AA Championship
1980	Eastern Kentucky	10–3	5–2	2nd	L NCAA Division I-AA Championship
1981	Eastern Kentucky	12–2	8–0	1st	L NCAA Division I-AA Championship
1982	Eastern Kentucky	13–0	7–0	1st	W NCAA Division I-AA Championship
1983	Eastern Kentucky	7–3–1	6–1	1st	L NCAA Division I-AA First Round
1984	Eastern Kentucky	8–4	6–1	1st	L NCAA Division I-AA First Round
1985	Eastern Kentucky	8–3	5–2	T–2nd	
1986	Eastern Kentucky	10–3–1	6–1	T–1st	L NCAA Division I-AA Semifinal
1987	Eastern Kentucky	9–3	5–1	T–1st	L NCAA Division I-AA Quarterfinal
1988	Eastern Kentucky	11–3	6–0	1st	L NCAA Division I-AA Semifinal
1989	Eastern Kentucky	9–3	5–1	2nd	L NCAA Division I-AA First Round
1990	Eastern Kentucky	10–2	5–1	T–1st	L NCAA Division I-AA First Round
1991	Eastern Kentucky	12–2	7–0	1st	L NCAA Division I-AA Semifinal
1992	Eastern Kentucky	9–3	7–1	2nd	L NCAA Division I-AA First Round
1993	Eastern Kentucky	8–4	8–0	1st	L NCAA Division I-AA First Round
1994	Eastern Kentucky	10–3	8–0	1st	L NCAA Division I-AA Quarterfinal
1995	Eastern Kentucky	9–3	7–1	2nd	L NCAA Division I-AA First Round
1996	Eastern Kentucky	6–5	6–2	T–2nd	
1997	Eastern Kentucky	8–4	7–0	1st	L NCAA Division I-AA First Round
1998	Eastern Kentucky	6–5	4–3	T–4th	
1999	Eastern Kentucky	7–4	4–3	T–3rd	
2000	Eastern Kentucky	6–5	3–4	5th	
2001	Eastern Kentucky	8–2	5–1	2nd	
2002	Eastern Kentucky	8–4	4–2	T–3rd	
Eastern Kentucky:		314–124–8	206–61–4		
Total:		314–124–8			
National championship Conference title Conference division title or championship game berth

== See also ==
- List of college football career coaching wins leaders
