= Madison-Model High School =

Former secondary school in Kentucky, United States

Coordinates: 37°44′42.6″N 84°17′44.3″W

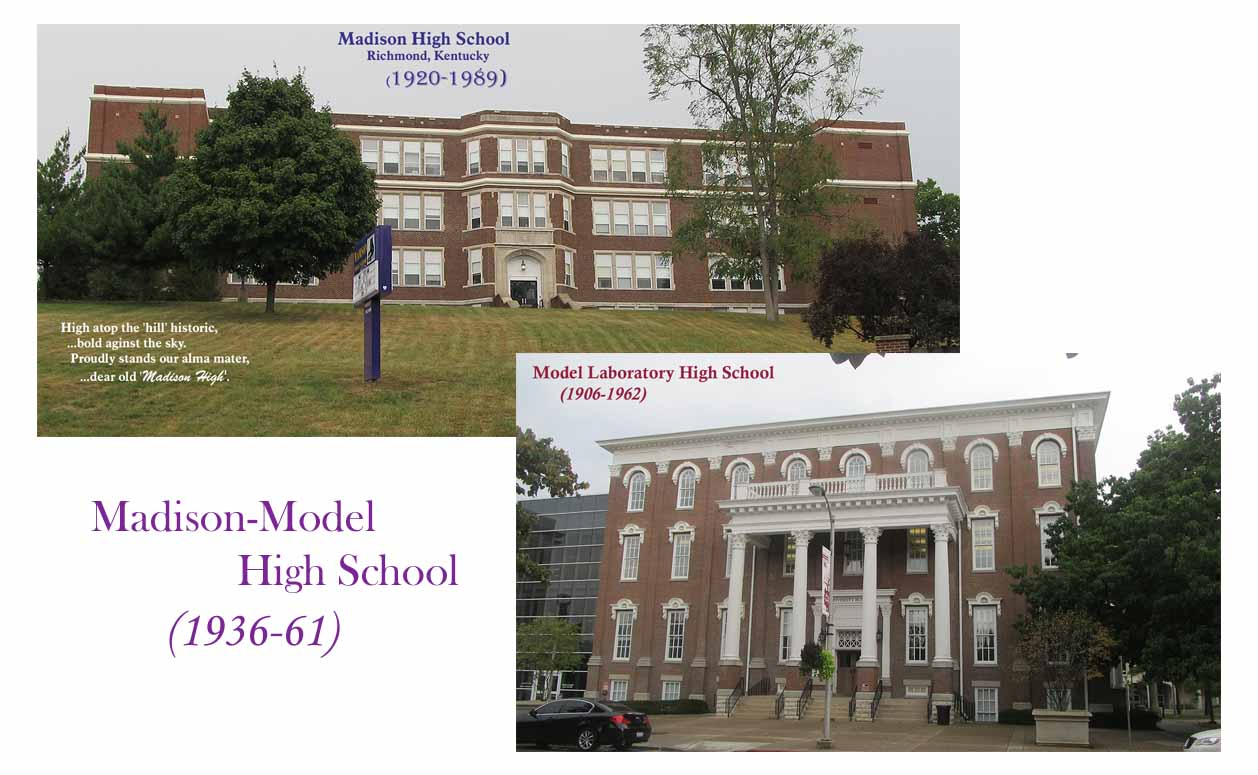
- Richmond, KY 40475; USA

Information
- Type: Public
- Established: 1936
- Closed: 1961
- Colors: Purple and White
- Song: Washington and Lee Swing
- Nickname: Royal Purples

Madison-Model High School was a secondary school located in Richmond, Kentucky.

From 1936 to 1961, a unique relationship was formed with Eastern Kentucky State College's Model Laboratory School and Richmond, Kentucky's public high school, Madison. This was accomplished through the efforts of then Eastern president Herman L. Donovan and Richmond City Schools superintendent William F. O'Donnell. The two divisions were combined to enrich their programs and to avoid a duplication of efforts. They were accredited jointly by the Southern Association of Secondary Schools as Madison-Model High School. They retained their respective organizations, but combined such activities as commencement, athletics, and music. Enrollment of both high schools (combined) averaged between 400 and 500 students. The joint relationship was terminated after the 1960−61 school year.

Over its 25-year existence, no Madison-Model competed in athletics as a member of the Kentucky High School Athletic Association. Its baseball teams were twice state runner-up (1945, 1946) and its basketball teams competed in the state tournament four times (1939, 1944, 1945 and 1947) as the 11th Region champion. Its football teams were coached by Roy Kidd from 1956 to 1960. Kidd went 41−10−1 over that five-year span.

Model Laboratory still exists today. Madison High School was consolidated with Madison Central High School after the 1988−89 school year and its physical plant (on north 2nd St.) is now occupied by Madison Middle School.
