= Madison County Schools (Kentucky) =

Public school district in Madison County, Kentucky

Location
- Madison County, Kentucky United States
- Coordinates: 37.7669°N 84.3192°W

District information
- Type: Public
- Motto: On Fire for Their Future
- Grades: PreK-12
- Established: 1932
- Superintendent: Randy Neeley (As of Jan. 1st, 2025)
- NCES District ID: 2103720

Students and staff
- Students: 11,065
- Teachers: 843.70 (on FTE basis)
- Student–teacher ratio: 13.11:1

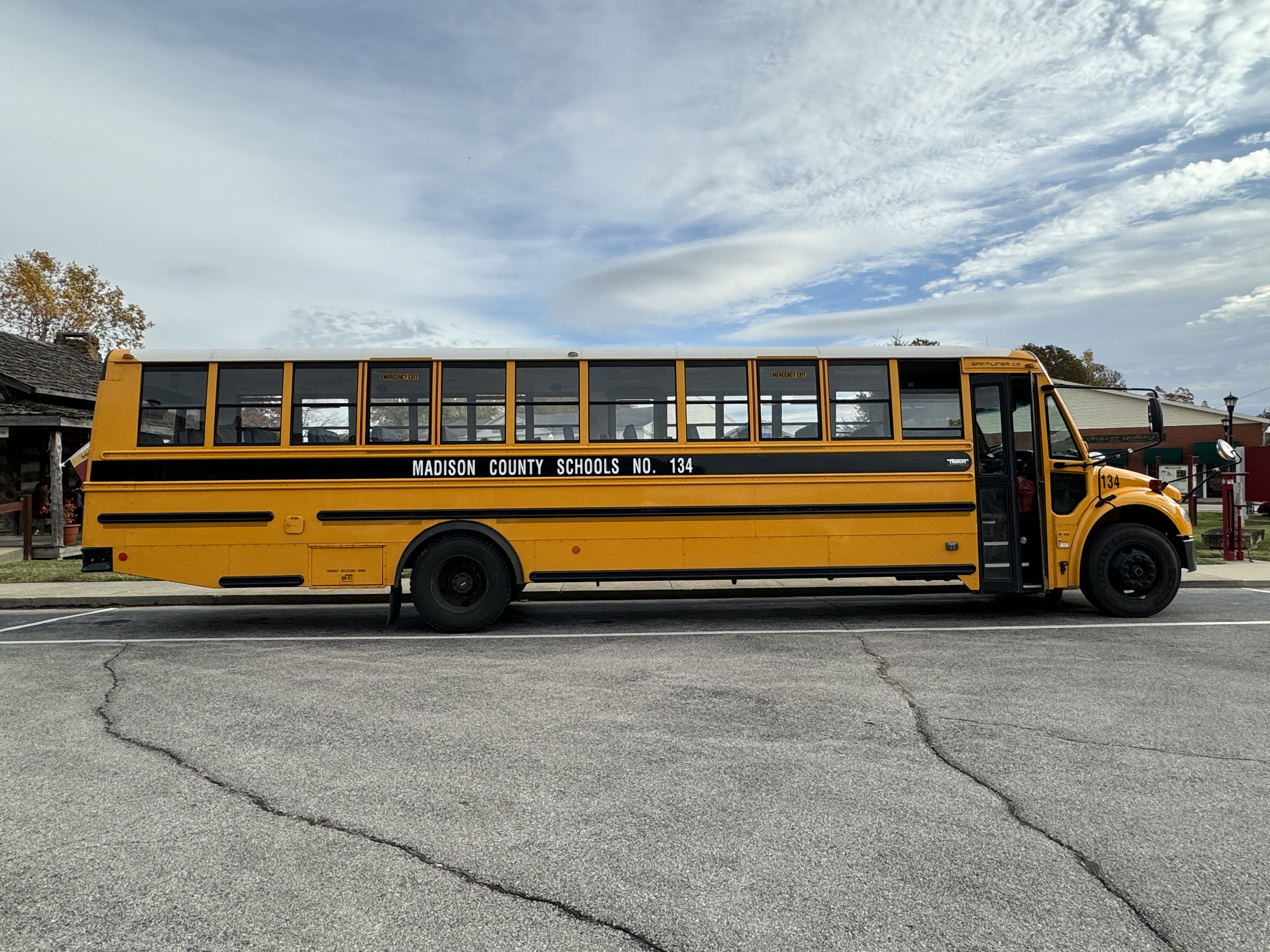
A Madison County school bus in Berea, Kentucky in 2023.

The Madison County School District is a public school district based in Richmond, Kentucky (USA). In addition to Richmond and Berea, the district serves the communities of Kingston, Kirksville, Waco, and all rural areas in Madison County.

== Elementary schools ==
- Boonesborough Elementary School
- Daniel Boone Elementary School
- Glenn Marshall Elementary School
- Kingston Elementary School
- Kirksville Elementary School
- Kit Carson Elementary School
- Shannon Johnson Elementary School
- Silver Creek Elementary School
- Waco Elementary School
- White Hall Elementary School
- Madison Kindergarten Academy (Kindergarten Only)

== Middle schools ==
- Foley Middle School
- Farristown Middle School
- Madison Middle School
- Clark-Moores Middle School
- B. Micheal Caudill Middle School

== High schools ==
- Madison Central High School
- Madison Southern High School

In 1988, the Richmond Independent School District merged into the Madison County school district.

== Ignite academies ==
Madison County Schools recently established in 2020, two academies named Ignite South in Berea and Ignite North in Richmond, primarily serving the students of Madison Southern High School, Madison Central High School, Berea Community High School, Model Laboratory School and Estill County High School. The Ignite Academies allow the students at the listed schools to enroll in programs that are not served in the main campus of the schools.

Ignite South introduced the following programs:

- Allied Health
- Business and Marketing
- Culinary Arts
- Diesel Mechanics
- Engineering
- Industrial Maintenance
- Welding
- Law and Public Safety

Ignite South currently serves Madison Southern, Madison Central and Berea Independent.

Ignite North introduced the following programs:

- E-Commerce Marketing
- Management and Entrepreneurship
- Health Science
- Engineering and Architecture
- Electrical Technology
- Welding Technology
- Automotive Technology
- Residential Carpentry
- Machine Tool – CNC (Computer Numerically Controlled)

Ignite North currently serves Madison Southern, Madison Central, Berea Independent, Model Laboratory and Estill County

== Proposed schools ==
The below schools are schools that Madison County Schools has proposed to build in their District Facility Plan. These school proposals have been approved by the Kentucky Department of Education.

- New Waco Elementary School
- New High School in the Richmond area (Possible to be named Madison Northern High School)
- New elementary school in the Berea area

== Former schools ==
- Model Laboratory School (monitored by EKU since foundation, formerly joint-controlled by Madison County Schools and Eastern Kentucky University)
- Madison High School (Defunct since 1988, Now Madison Middle School)
- Richmond High School (Defunct after Richmond Independent Schools merged with Madison County Schools)
