= LaFontaine Preparatory School =

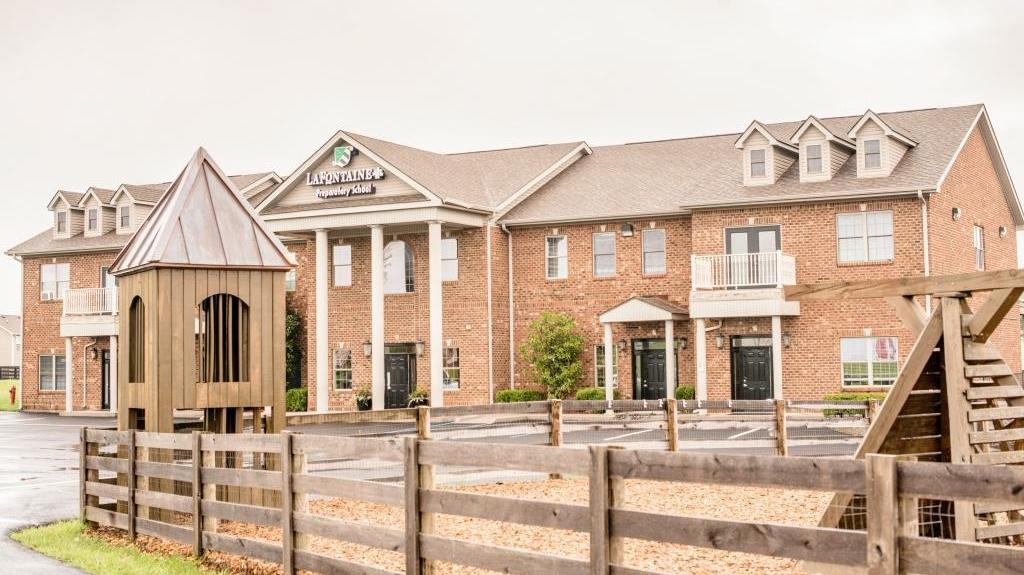
- Front of LaFontaine Preparatory School

Location
- 993 Four Mile Road; Richmond, Kentucky 40475; United States; 37°45′36″N 84°16′18″W

Information
- School type: Private, nonsectarian school
- Student to teacher ratio: 11:2

LaFontaine Preparatory School (abbreviated LPS) is a private, nonsectarian school located in Richmond, Kentucky, serving students from Pre-Kindergarten to 5th grade.

Within the school's first year of being open, the school enrolled 13 Pre-Kindergarten students. Over time, LaFontaine Preparatory School became a non-profit Private school and added more grades as the school grew.

== Educational philosophy ==
LaFontaine describes its approach as "dynamic learning experiences" in a "microschool" setting, with small class sizes, so teachers can deeply understand each student's strengths, challenges, and passions.

Some outstanding features of LaFontaine's educational program include:

- Three recesses per day to encourage movement and student engagement
- Montessori-inspired learning in the early grades for social development and critical thinking
- Engineering education introduced as early as 2nd grade, with four sessions per week
- Monthly field trips to extend learning outside the classroom

Family involvement is emphasized, and LPS reports high attendance (around 95%) at parent-teacher conferences.

== Developments ==
In 2023, there was a proposal and public discussion for LPS to become a charter school with Madison County Public Schools potentially becoming Kentucky's first charter school, however, the proposal was declined by the Madison County Public School Board of Education.
