= Matthew Campbell =

Matthew Campbell may refer to:

- Matthew Campbell (Australian footballer) (born 1964), Australian rules footballer with Brisbane and commentator
- Matt Campbell (Australian footballer) (born 1987), Australian rules footballer with North Melbourne
- Matt Campbell (offensive lineman) (born 1972), American football offensive lineman
- Matt Campbell (American football coach) (born 1979), American football coach and former player
- Matt Campbell (racing driver) (born 1995), Australian racing car driver
- Matthew Campbell (civil servant) (1907–1998), British civil servant
- Matthew Campbell (minister) (1823–1897), American Baptist preacher
- Matt Campbell (darts player) (born 1989), Canadian darts player
- Matty Campbell (born 1995), English bodybuilder and gladiator in Gladiators
