= Luke Stocker =

American football player and coach (born 1988)

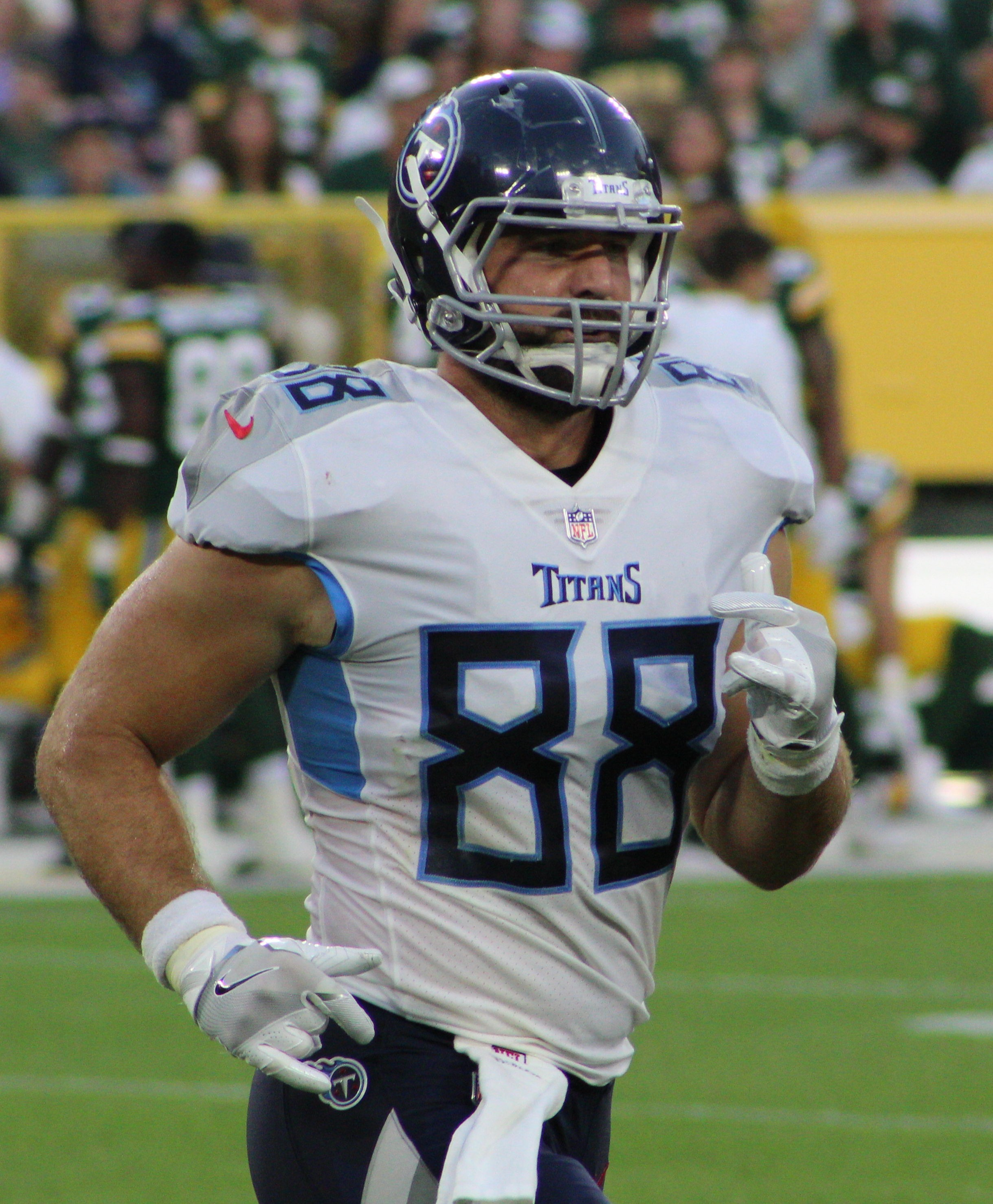
- Stocker with the Tennessee Titans in 2018

Tennessee Titans
- Title: Tight ends coach

Personal information
- Born: July 17, 1988 (age 38); Berea, Kentucky, U.S.
- Listed height: 6 ft 5 in (1.96 m)
- Listed weight: 253 lb (115 kg)

Career information
- Position: Tight end (No. 88, 80, 35)
- High school: Madison Southern (Berea)
- College: Tennessee (2006–2010)
- NFL draft: 2011: 4th round, 104th overall pick

Career history

Playing
- Tampa Bay Buccaneers (2011–2017); Tennessee Titans (2017–2018); Atlanta Falcons (2019–2020); Tennessee Titans (2021)*; Minnesota Vikings (2021)
- * Offseason or practice squad member only

Coaching
- Tennessee Titans (2023–present); Offensive assistant (2023); Assistant tight ends coach (2024); Tight ends coach (2025–present)

Career NFL statistics
- Receptions: 85
- Receiving yards: 705
- Receiving touchdowns: 5
- Stats at Pro Football Reference

Lucas Aaron Stocker (July 17, 1988) is an American professional football coach and former tight end and fullback who is currently the tight ends coach for the Tennessee Titans of the National Football League (NFL). He played college football for the Tennessee Volunteers and was selected by the Tampa Bay Buccaneers in the fourth round of the 2011 NFL draft. Stocker also played for the Titans, Atlanta Falcons, and Minnesota Vikings.

== Early life ==
Stocker was born on July 17, 1988, in Berea, Kentucky. He attended Madison Southern High School in Berea, where he was an honor student and three-year starter.

== College career ==
Stocker played tight end at the University of Tennessee for the Volunteers from 2007 to 2010. He scored his first college touchdown in a game against Alabama in the 2007 season. During the 2009 season opener against Western Kentucky, Stocker caught two touchdowns in the win.

Stocker finished his collegiate career with 85 receptions for 956 yards and eight touchdowns.

== Professional career ==
Pre-draft measurables
Height	Weight	Arm length	Hand span	Wingspan	40-yard dash	10-yard split	20-yard split	20-yard shuttle	Three-cone drill	Vertical jump	Broad jump	Bench press
6 ft 4 3/4 in (1.95 m)	258 lb (117 kg)	33 in (0.84 m)	9 3/4 in (0.25 m)	6 ft 6 1/2 in (1.99 m)	4.70 s	1.59 s	2.71 s	4.40 s	7.03 s	33.0 in (0.84 m)	9 ft 7 in (2.92 m)	27 reps
All values from the NFL Combine/Pro Day

=== Tampa Bay Buccaneers ===
==== 2011 season ====
Stocker was selected in the fourth round (104th overall) of the 2011 NFL draft by the Tampa Bay Buccaneers and signed his contract worth four years on July 28, 2011. Stocker suffered his first injury on the first day he practiced and was out for a few weeks recovering from a hip injury. Stocker recorded his first career reception on a 17-yard pass from Josh Freeman during a Week 2 24–20 road victory over the Minnesota Vikings. Stocker finished his rookie year with 12 receptions for 92 yards and no touchdowns in 14 games and nine starts.

==== 2012 season ====
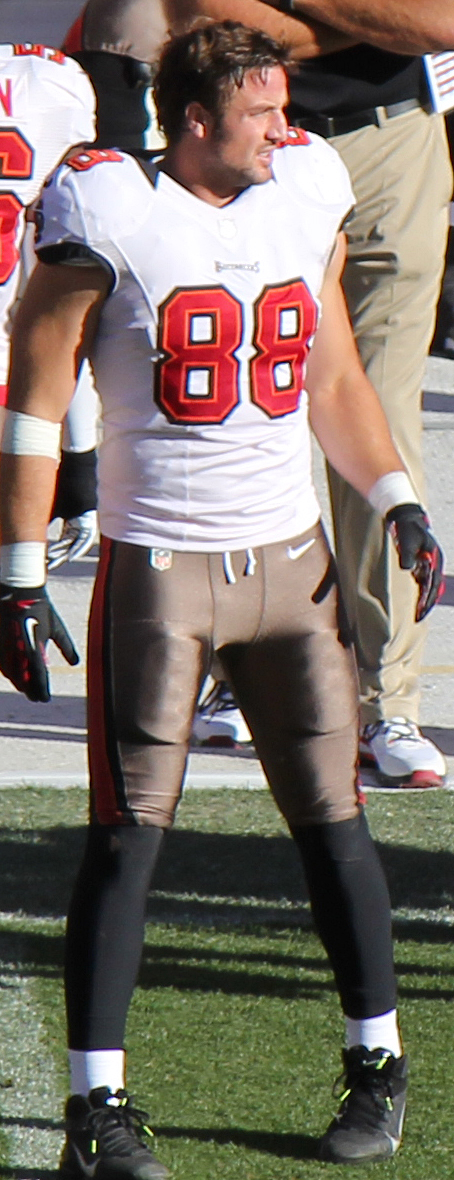
Stocker in 2012

During the 2012 season under new head coach Greg Schiano, Stocker saw some slight improvement in play. He also was praised for being a good interior blocker but again had a season shortened by injuries.

Stocker finished his second professional season with 16 receptions for 165 yards and a touchdown in 16 games and 11 starts.

==== 2013 season ====
In 2013, Stocker played in two games and recorded no statistics before going on injured reserve.

==== 2014 season ====
Stocker was healthy for most of the season as he only missed two games late in the season due to a concussion. Although his receiving stats were a low seven receptions for 41 yards and no touchdowns, Stocker's game took a turn in a more positive direction as an interior blocker as well as moving to fullback in place of a suspended and injured Javorskie Lane. Stocker's ability to be an effective lead blocker earned great praise and a new role as a blocking full back after the team let the previous season's lead blocking machine Erik Lorig go via free agency. Stocker was also a solid contributor on special teams.

==== 2015 season ====
On March 9, 2015, after a strong performance at full back and on special teams, the Buccaneers signed Stocker to a three-year contract extension. He finished the 2015 season with nine catches for 61 yards and a touchdown in 14 games and 13 starts.

==== 2016 season ====
In 2016, Stocker recorded five receptions for 23 yards in 12 games and 10 starts.

==== 2017 season ====
On November 28, 2017, Stocker was released by the Buccaneers. Before he was released, Stocker had three receptions for 18 yards and a touchdown in nine games and four starts.

=== Tennessee Titans (first stint) ===
==== 2017 season ====
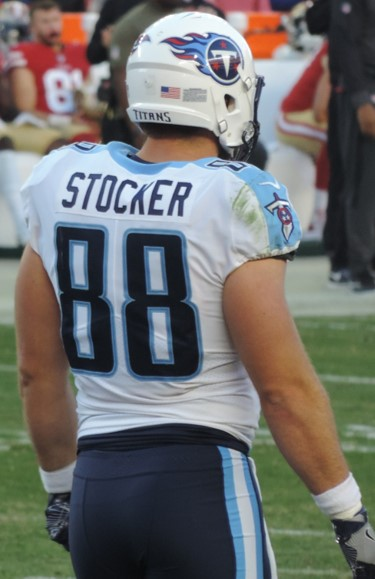
Stocker in 2017

On December 4, 2017, Stocker signed a two-year contract with the Tennessee Titans. He caught his first reception as a Titan in the regular season finale against the Jacksonville Jaguars for 12 yards during the 15–10 victory. The Titans finished second in the AFC South with a 9–7 record and made the playoffs as a Wild Card team. Stocker appeared in his first two postseason games that season but made no receptions in either game.

==== 2018 season ====
During the season-opening 27–20 road loss to the Miami Dolphins, Stocker recorded two receptions for 37 yards, including a season-long reception of 31 yards. During Week 7 against the Los Angeles Chargers in London, he caught two passes for 11 yards and his first touchdown as a Titan on a one-yard pass from quarterback Marcus Mariota in the narrow 20–19 loss. In the season finale against the Indianapolis Colts on Sunday Night Football, Stocker had a 22-yard touchdown reception from backup quarterback Blaine Gabbert during the 33–17 loss.

Stocker finished the 2018 season with 15 receptions for 165 yards and a career-high two touchdowns in 16 games and 11 starts.

=== Atlanta Falcons ===
On March 14, 2019, Stocker signed a two-year contract with the Atlanta Falcons. Stocker finished the 2019 season with eight receptions for 53 yards in 15 games and nine starts.

On March 16, 2020, Stocker was released. However, he was re-signed on August 14. Stocker finished the 2020 season with seven receptions for 63 yards in 16 games and 13 starts.

=== Tennessee Titans (second stint) ===
On July 31, 2021, Stocker re-signed with the Titans. He was released on September 2.

=== Minnesota Vikings ===
On October 13, 2021, Stocker was signed to the Minnesota Vikings practice squad. He was promoted to the active roster on November 4. Stocker finished the 2021 season with two receptions for 12 yards in 12 games and no starts.

== NFL career statistics ==
Legend
**Bold**	Career high

=== Regular season ===
Year	Team	Games		Receiving					Rushing					Fumbles	
Year	Team	GP	GS	Rec	Yds	Avg	Lng	TD	Att	Yds	Avg	Lng	TD	Fum	Lost
2011	TB	14	9	12	92	7.7	24	0	0	0	0.0	0	0	0	0
2012	TB	**16**	11	**16**	**165**	10.3	**33**	1	0	0	0.0	0	0	0	0
2013	TB	2	2	0	0	0.0	0	0	0	0	0.0	0	0	0	0
2014	TB	13	7	7	41	5.9	11	0	0	0	0.0	0	0	0	0
2015	TB	14	**13**	9	61	6.8	14	1	0	0	0.0	0	0	0	0
2016	TB	12	10	5	23	4.6	11	0	0	0	0.0	0	0	0	0
2017	TB	9	3	3	18	6.0	8	1	0	0	0.0	0	0	0	0
2017	TEN	3	2	1	12	**12.0**	12	0	0	0	0.0	0	0	0	0
2018	TEN	**16**	11	15	**165**	11.0	31	**2**	**1**	0	0.0	0	0	0	0
2019	ATL	15	9	8	53	6.6	18	0	0	0	0.0	0	0	**1**	0
2020	ATL	**16**	**13**	7	63	9.0	25	0	0	0	0.0	0	0	0	0
2021	MIN	12	0	2	12	6.0	7	0	0	0	0.0	0	0	0	0
Career		142	91	85	705	8.3	33	5	1	0	0.0	0	0	1	0

=== Postseason ===
Year	Team	Games		Receiving					Rushing					Fumbles	
Year	Team	GP	GS	Rec	Yds	Avg	Lng	TD	Att	Yds	Avg	Lng	TD	Fum	Lost
2017	TEN	2	0	0	0	0.0	0	0	0	0	0.0	0	0	0	0
Career		2	0	0	0	0.0	0	0	0	0	0.0	0	0	0	0

== Coaching career ==
On July 18, 2023, Stocker was hired as a quality control coach for the Titans. He was named the assistant tight ends coach in 2024 under new head coach Brian Callahan and was promoted to tight ends coach the following season. Following the firing of Callahan and the end of the 2025 season, new head coach Robert Saleh chose to keep Stocker on his staff.

== Personal life ==
Stocker and his wife, Daine, have three children: Liam, Collins, and Laurel. He is an avid bass fisherman.
