= Max Good =

American basketball coach (born 1941)

Biographical details
- Born: July 16, 1941 (age 85)
- Education: Eastern Kentucky University

Coaching career (HC unless noted)
- 1970–1973: Madison HS (JV)
- 1973–1976: Madison HS
- 1976–1981: Eastern Kentucky (assistant)
- 1981–1989: Eastern Kentucky
- 1989–1999: Maine Central Institute
- 1999–2000: UNLV (assistant)
- 2000–2001: UNLV (interim HC)
- 2001–2008: Bryant
- 2008–2009: Loyola Marymount (assistant)
- 2009–2014: Loyola Marymount
- 2016–2017: Pratt CC

Head coaching record
- Overall: 318–341 (college); 14–22 (junior college)

Accomplishments and honors

Awards
- OVC Coach of the Year (1987); WCC Coach of the Year (2012)

Max Good (born July 16, 1941) is an American basketball coach. He was head men's basketball coach at Maine Central Institute, Bryant University, Loyola Marymount University, and Pratt Community College.

== Early life and education ==
Good grew up in Monticello, Maine and attended Gardiner Area High School. He spent a prep year at Maine Central Institute before attending Transylvania University in Kentucky, where he was coached by Lee Rose. He graduated from Eastern Kentucky University with a master's degree.

== Coaching career ==
=== Madison High School ===
Good began his coaching career at Madison High School in Richmond, Kentucky in 1970. He served as the junior varsity coach for three seasons (1970–1973) and then served three seasons (1973–1976) as the head coach. His 1975 team finished 23–6 and was ranked as a top ten team in Kentucky by the Associated Press.

=== Eastern Kentucky University ===
He was the assistant coach at Eastern Kentucky University in Richmond, Kentucky for five seasons (1976–1981). He replaced Ed Bhyre as head coach in 1981 and served through 1989. His overall record at EKU was 96–129 (.427). He carded a 19–11 record in 1987 and was named the Ohio Valley Conference Coach of the Year. In 1988, the Colonels went 18–11.

=== Maine Central Institute ===
Good served as the head coach at Maine Central Institute (MCI) for 10 seasons (1989–1999). He compiled a 275–30 (.902) record over that span. Among the players coached by Good at MCI was future NBA player and television analyst Caron Butler, who joined MCI for the 1998-99 season. MCI was five times the New England Prep School Athletic Conference champion during his tenure. MCI captured back-to-back conference championships (1997–1999). They were 69–4 over those two years (35–0 and 34–4). Good's MCI teams went undefeated three times (26–0 in 1989–90, 24–0 in 1990–91, and 35–0 in 1997–98). From 1989 to 1992, Maine Central Institute compiled 79 straight victories. His 1992 squad was 29–1.

=== University of Nevada, Las Vegas ===
Good joined the UNLV staff in 1999–00 as an assistant coach. He spent the 2000–01 season as the interim head coach at the University of Nevada, Las Vegas (UNLV) after Bill Bayno was dismissed as head coach. He posted a record of 13–9 in his one season with the Runnin' Rebels.

=== Bryant University ===
Good spent seven seasons as the head coach at Bryant University, where he led the Bulldogs to a 132–86 record in eight seasons. When Good was named head coach at Bryant in 2001, he inherited a program that had four straight losing seasons. He posted a 17–14 record in his second season and Bryant was named Most Improved team by the New England Basketball Coaches. By 2004 season, Good lead the Bulldogs to 23 wins, earning the school's first NCAA tournament berth in 24 years, after which they advanced to the Sweet Sixteen. In his fourth year, Good led Bryant to a 25–9 record. They made a total of five-straight NCAA Division II Sweet 16 finishes. In 2004–05, they played in NCAA Division II Championship and lost to Virginia Union in the title game 63–58.

=== Loyola Marymount University ===
After leading the Loyola Marymount University Lions to an 18–15 overall record (9–7 in conference), Good was named West Coast Conference Coach of the Year for 2009–10 season by Collegeinsider.com. He was Coach of the year again for the 2011-12 season. The 18 wins were the most by Loyola Marymount since 1996. The 15-game turnaround from last season's 3–24 campaign was the second-largest in the nation, as well as the second-largest turnaround in LMU history.

On March 17, 2010, Good led the Lions against the University of the Pacific Tigers at LMU's Gersten Pavilion. This was the Lions' first post-season tournament under Good and its first since 1990.

=== University of Nevada, Las Vegas ===
In 2014 Good returned to UNLV as special assistant to head coach Dave Rice.

=== Pratt Community College ===
In 2016, became head coach of the Pratt Community College Beavers. He led the team to advance to the Kansas Jayhawk Community College Conference in 2017. He announced his resignation in the 2017-18 season so that he could spend more time with his wife Phyllis. He was replaced by assistant coach Sean Flynn.

In 2019, Good was inducted into the Maine Basketball Hall of Fame.

== Personal life ==
He lives in Henderson with his wife Phyllis, and their dogs.
