= Bobtown, Kentucky =

Hamlet in Madison County, Kentucky

Bobtown, Kentucky Joe Lick, Joe's Lick Knob
- Unincorporated community
- Location within Kentucky Location within the United States
- Coordinates: 37.618°N 84.229°W
- Country: United States
- State: Kentucky
- County: Madison
- Established: 1769

Bobtown, also known as Joe Lick, is a rural hamlet outside Berea, Madison County, Kentucky, United States. Founded around 1769, since the mid-19th century it has been a predominantly African-American community. It is located 12 miles south of Richmond, Kentucky, and roughly 5 miles northeast of the city center of Berea, Kentucky; and is near Farristown and Middletown, two other African American communities.

== History ==
It was founded c. 1769 as Joe Lick, or Joe's Lick Knob, and is said to be named after an early settler who had carved his name on a stone fence. One of the first houses was built for Capt. Phillipps in the early 1800s, on the Berea and Kingston Road.

Starting in 1865 after the American Civil War, African Americans were allowed to purchase land and settled in this area. In 1872, the settlement was renamed Bobtown in honor of "Uncle Bob" Fitch, a long-time African-American resident. The community was tied together as a community by the formation of the New Liberty Baptist Church (1866), and with schools, and stores.

Rev. Matthew Campbell (1823–1896) founded the New Liberty Baptist Church in 1866; and Rev. Thomas H. Broaddus was the pastor for many years in Bobtown and for the surrounding towns. In the early history of the community they had separate White and Black elementary schools. In the 1930s with a merger of schools, the Black students were bussed to the Middletown Consolidated School and Richmond High School; and White students attended schools in Kingston. The railroad industry and farming industry were the largest employers in the early history. Pigs, cattle, and tobacco were farmed locally.
