= Eastern Kentucky Colonels women's basketball =

Collegiate women's basketball team

2025–26 Eastern Kentucky Colonels women's basketball team
- University: Eastern Kentucky University
- Head coach: Greg Todd (5th season)
- Location: Richmond, Kentucky
- Arena: Baptist Health Arena (capacity: 6,500)
- Conference: UAC
- Nickname: Colonels
- Colors: Maroon and white

NCAA Division I tournament appearances
- 1997, 2005

Conference tournament champions
- Kentucky Women's Intercollegiate Conference; 1972, 1973, 1974, 1975, 1976 Ohio Valley Conference; 1997, 2005

Conference regular-season champions
- 1995, 1997, 1998, 2002, 2005, 2026

Uniforms
Home	Away

The Eastern Kentucky Colonels women's basketball team is a women's college basketball team at Eastern Kentucky University, located in Richmond, Kentucky. After having played women's basketball in the Ohio Valley Conference since it began sponsoring women's sports in 1977, EKU joined the Atlantic Sun Conference in July 2021. The 2024–25 season will mark EKU's fourth season as a member institution in the ASUN Conference. Home games are played at Baptist Health Arena, seating 6,500 fans for basketball contests.

== History ==
Eastern Kentucky began play in 1971. They won the Kentucky Women's Intercollegiate Conference (KWIC) Tournament in 1972, 1973, 1974, 1975, and 1976. They joined the Ohio Valley Conference when that conference started sponsoring women's sports in 1977, they won five regular season championships (1995, 1997, 1998, 2002, 2005) and two tournament championships (1997, 2005). The Colonels have made the postseason five times, with two being in the NCAA Tournament (1997, 2005), two in the Women's National Invitational Tournament (2002, 2024), and one in the Women's Basketball Invitational (2013). As of the end of the 2023–24 season, they have an all-time record of 720–730.

In 2021, Greg Todd was named the 10th head basketball coach in program history. He led the program to a 22–12 overall record during the 2023–24 season, the first 20-win season since 2004–05. EKU appeared in the Atlantic Sun Conference Women's Basketball Tournament for the third consecutive season, defeating Lipscomb 99–68 on the road in the quarterfinals, ultimately helping the team receive an at-large bid to the 2024 Women's Basketball Invitational Tournament, losing to Purdue Fort Wayne 83–75 in the opening round on the road.

== Postseason ==
=== NCAA tournament results ===
The Colonels have made the NCAA Division I women's basketball tournament twice. They have a record of 0–2.

Year	Round	Opponent	Result
1997	First Round	Georgia	L, 55–91
2005	First Round	Arizona State	L, 65–87

=== Women's National Invitational results ===
The Colonels have made the Women's National Invitational Tournament (WNIT) twice. They have a record of 1–2.

Year	Round	Opponent	Result
2002	First Round	Missouri State	W, 72–65 (OT)
2002	Second Round	Alabama	L, 77–99
2024	First Round	Purdue Fort Wayne	L, 75–83

=== Women's Basketball Invitational results ===
The Colonels have made the Women's Basketball Invitational (WBI) once. They have a record of 0–1.

Year	Round	Opponent	Result
2013	First Round	Elon	L, 61–68
