= Estill County High School =

Public high school in Kentucky, US

Location
- 397 Engineer Rd; Irvine, KY, Estill County, KY, Kentucky 40336; United States; 37°44′10″N 83°59′20″W

Information
- School type: Public high school
- Established: c. 1917
- Status: Open (as of 2023)
- School district: Estill County Schools
- NCES District ID: 2101760
- Superintendent: Charlie Brock
- Principal: Trent Singleton
- Teaching staff: 41.00 (FTE)
- Grades: 9–12
- Enrollment: 647 (2023–2024)
- Student to teacher ratio: 15.78
- Language: English and Spanish
- Colors: Royal blue, black and white
- Team name: Engineers
- Website: https://hs.estill.kyschools.us/

Estill County High School is a public high school located in Irvine, Kentucky, United States. The school mascot is the Engineers - often referred to informally as "Neers". The school's colors are blue, white, and black. It is the only high school in Estill County, Kentucky, serving approximately 630 students. Estill County High School is also a participant in Madison County Schools' Ignite Academy.

== Athletic awards ==
- Marching band: Kentucky Music Educators Association State Champion – Class AA – 2015, 2016, 2024 Class AAA – 2022
- Emma Winkle: 2022 Miss Kentucky Softball

== Notable alumni ==
- Kevin Richardson – member of the Backstreet Boys
- Sullivan Canaday White – American theater director, producer and educator in Lexington, Kentucky
