= Greg Todd (basketball) =

American college basketball coach

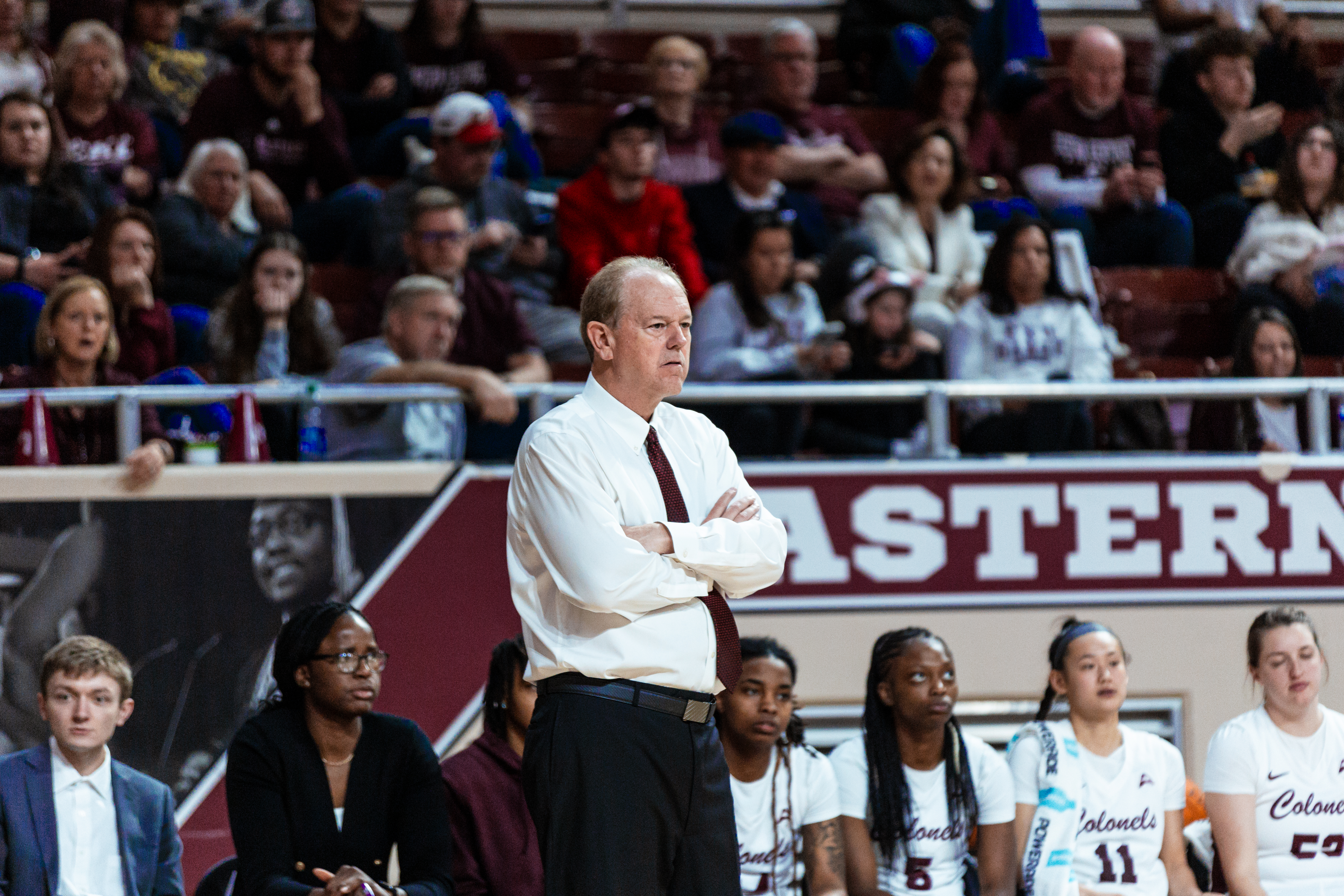
- Todd coaching in 2024

Current position
- Title: Head coach
- Team: Eastern Kentucky
- Conference: UAC
- Record: 101–63 (.616)

Biographical details
- Born: Berea, Kentucky, U.S.
- Education: Eastern Kentucky ('84)

Coaching career (HC unless noted)
- 1992–1999: Berea Community HS
- 1999–2006: Lexington Catholic HS
- 2006–2014: Transylvania
- 2014–2021: Morehead State
- 2021–present: Eastern Kentucky

Head coaching record
- Overall: 363–233 (.609) (college); 391–82 (.827) (high school)

Accomplishments and honors

Championships
- ASUN regular season (2026)

Awards
- EA Sports National HS Girls Basketball Coach of the Year (2006); 4× Heartland Collegiate Athletic Conference Women's Basketball Coach of the Year; Kentucky High School Basketball Hall of Fame (2017); Berea Community School Athletics Hall of Fame (2019); Lexington Catholic High School Hall of Fame (2019); Herald Leader Kentucky Women's Coach of the Year (2023); Kentucky High School Athletic Association Hall of Fame (2025); ASUN coach of the year (2026)

Greg Todd is an American college basketball coach and is currently in his fifth season as the women's basketball head coach at Eastern Kentucky University, which is located in Richmond, Kentucky and is a member of the United Athletic Conference in the NCAA's Division I.

== Biography ==
Todd is a native of Berea, Kentucky and a 1978 graduate Berea Community High School. As a student-athlete at Berea Community High School, Todd starred on the basketball court where he set still-standing school records for scoring (1,683) and rebounding (966). Following high school career, Todd attended Eastern Kentucky University where he graduated in 1984. He and his wife, Renee, have three children, Brooke, Katie, and Robert (Robby).

Both his daughters, Katie and Brooke, are graduates of Morehead State University. Brooke played four seasons for her father with the Morehead State women's team from 2014 to 2018; she departed the school second in career blocked shots and is now a physician assistant specializing in orthopedic surgery and sports medicine in Lexington, Kentucky. Katie graduated from the University of Kentucky and is now a first-year resident physician with the UK Pediatric Residency program. Robby currently attends the University of Pikeville and is on a full-ride scholarship with the men's basketball team, prior to Pikeville, he spent two seasons with the Eastern Kentucky University men's basketball team under head coach A. W. Hamilton.

== Coaching career ==
Todd began his head coaching career at his alma mater, Berea Community High School. From 1992 to 1999, Todd led the Lady Pirates to a record of 166–54 and seven 20-win seasons. Todd's 1998 BCHS team achieved the best finish in school history during the 1997–98 campaign as it advanced to the semi-final round of the 1998 KHSAA Sweet Sixteen Tournament where it fell to eventual champion, Elizabethtown. In 1999, Todd took over the women's basketball program at Lexington Catholic High School. From 1999 to 2006, the coach compiled a stellar 225–26 record which included three KHSAA State Championships (2001, 2005, 2006) and two runner-up finishes. Todd's 2005–06 team would earn the coach national recognition as the EA Sports National Coach of the Year award as it finished 35–1 on its way to a championship and a KHSAA record No. 3 ranking in the final USA Today national girls' basketball poll. The team featured five All-State players and seven players that signed scholarships to play in Division I. Todd finished his 14 seasons coaching in the high school ranks with a combined record of 391–80 (.830) and is the only coach in KHSAA girls' basketball history to win over 375 games and have less than 100 losses.

In July 2017, Todd's achievements coaching high school basketball were recognized as he was inducted into the Kentucky High School Basketball Hall of Fame in Owensboro, Kentucky. In 2019, Todd was inducted into the Berea Community School Athletics Hall of Fame as well as the Lexington Catholic High School Hall of Fame.

Following his run at Lexington Catholic, Todd moved into the collegiate coaching ranks at Division III Transylvania University beginning in 2006–07 season. Todd took over a team that had a losing record the previous season and immediately improved them to a 19–9 record and a third-place finish in the Heartland Collegiate Athletic Conference. After nearly upsetting conference champion Manchester in the conference tournament final, Transylvania received the first of the three invitations to the NCAA Women's Division III Basketball Championship it would get during Todd's tenure. In his eight seasons at Transylvania, his teams won three conferences regular season and two tournament championships, accumulating a record of 157–64.

Todd then accepted the same position at Morehead State University, leading the Morehead State Eagles, his team was picked to finish last in the twelve-team race, but finished 8–8 and in sixth place after fading from an early third place. In 2018–2019 Todd had arguably his best season as a coach as he led the Eagles to a 24–11 year capped off by a Women's National Invitational Tournament bid, only the second ever in program history. In the opening round, the Eagles traveled to Columbus, Ohio, to play the Ohio State Buckeyes of the Big Ten Conference. After trailing most of the first half, Todd's team fought back to score an upset win over the Buckeyes 71–61, which many would consider being the program's biggest victory in the modern era. Todd's Eagles then traveled to Bowling Green, Kentucky to face Western Kentucky and eventually lost in heartbreaking fashion against the Hilltoppers in the round of 32 by a score of 68–65.

While at Morehead State, Todd coached five players to First-Team All-OVC honors, two players to Second-Team All-OVC honors, two All-OVC Newcomer Team members, and one All-OVC Tournament Team member. He helped the program achieve unparalleled recruiting victories as it has signed four previous ESPN Top 100 players.

Todd left Morehead State at the end of the 2020–2021 season to accept the same position at his alma mater, Eastern Kentucky, who in the same year departed the Ohio Valley Conference for the Atlantic Sun Conference, a league which MSU remained in.

In his first season, Todd led EKU to a 15–16 overall record, which improved the team's win total by six wins from the previous year. EKU earned a home game in the 2021–22 Atlantic Sun Conference Women's Basketball Tournament, defeating 6-seed Kennesaw State by a score of 71–57 to advance to the quarterfinals.

During the 2022–23 season, Todd signed a total of six players out of the transfer portal, including Marquette's Antwainette Walker, who helped lead the program to an 18–14 overall record and its second consecutive trip to the Atlantic Sun Conference Women's Basketball Tournament. In the regular season, EKU would travel to Dublin, Ireland to compete in the 2022 MAAC/ASUN Dublin Challenge, defeating Rider 85–64 in the historic National Basketball Arena, home of the Ireland National Basketball programs and the Basketball Ireland headquarters. Additionally, the Colonels visited Army West Point and defeated the women's team by a vast 83–62 final score. EKU would go on to win 11 games in Atlantic Sun Conference play, ending the season with a 73–55 loss to Austin Peay in the conference quarterfinals. Antwainette Walker was named to the National Basketball Hall of Fame Ann Myers Drysdale Shooting Guard of the Year Award as well as the Dawn Staley Late Season Watchlist, both awards recognizing the top guards across NCAA Division I. She finished the season named the ASUN Newcomer of the Year and Kentucky Herald Leader Women's Player of the Year. Todd was named the Kentucky Herald Leader Women's Coach of the Year, the first honor of his career.

In 2023–24, Todd coached the Colonels to a 22–12 overall record and 9–7 mark in ASUN Conference play, EKU's first 20-win season since 2004–05. Eastern Kentucky opened the regular season with a 9–2 record, the best start to a season in program history, only suffering losses to the Tennessee Lady Vols coached by Kellie Harper on the road, cutting the deficit to just one point in the fourth quarter in Food City Center, and nationally ranked No. 4 Utah Utes in the 2023 Great Alaska Shootout Championship in Anchorage, Alaska. Todd earned his 700th career win as a head coach as the team upset UAB in the first round of the shootout. Todd and the Colonels won nine games in league play, earning the 5-seed in the Atlantic Sun Conference Women's Basketball Tournament, defeating Lipscomb 99–68 in the quarterfinals, the team's third consecutive season making the tournament. Two players were named All-Conference, including Antwainette Walker who was named the ASUN Preseason Player of the Year and Becky Hammon Mid-Major Player of the Year Watchlist. Todd became the fastest coach in Eastern Kentucky program history to record 50 wins, doing so in just three short seasons. He led EKU to its first appearance in the Women's National Invitational Tournament since 2002 and the first national postseason tournament since 2013, falling to Purdue Fort Wayne 83–75 in the opening round, Todd's third WNIT as an Division I head coach. Eastern Kentucky spent a program record eight weeks receiving votes in the CollegeInsider.com Women's Mid-Major Top 25 Poll, released on each Tuesday during the regular season. Also, Todd pushed the program to a then record No. 162 ranking in the NCAA NET poll on Jan. 26, 2024.

In 2024–25, Todd guided the Colonels to a 21–12 overall record and 10–8 mark in ASUN Conference play, marking consecutive 20-win seasons for Eastern Kentucky for the first time since 2001–02. After suffering three losses in the team's first four games, two of those to the No. 7 LSU coached by hall of famer Kim Mulkey and Michigan State, the Colonels proceeded to win their next 10 games from November 17 to January 1 heading into the new year. In the stretch, Todd and Eastern Kentucky picked up several notable non-conference victories over Northern Kentucky, Indiana State, Northern Illinois, and University of Hawaiʻi at Hilo on the road. Todd guided the Colonels to double-digit win totals in conference play, including two three-game winning streaks, leading to a fourth-place finish and host-seed bid in the Atlantic Sun Conference Women's Basketball Tournament. Eastern Kentucky defeated 5-seed Stetson in the opening round at Baptist Health Arena on March 8, 2025, before falling on the road in the semifinals at No. 1-seed Florida Gulf Coast. The Colonels received votes in two weeks of the CollegeInsider.com Women's Mid-Major Top 25 poll and reached a school record No. 123 ranking in the NCAA NET poll on December 1, 2024. Three players received All-Atlantic Sun Conference recognition, including point guard Alice Recanati who departed the school as Eastern Kentucky's all-time leader in career assists, game played, games started, and minutes played. She signed a professional contract with Herner TC in Germany a part of the Damen-Basketball-Bundesliga league.

The 2025–26 season marks Todd's fifth season at the helm. Entering the year, he is currently holds the highest winning percentage of any coach in Eastern Kentucky women's basketball history. In the last three years, he's guided the Colonels to over 60 total wins, which is the second most among all Kentucky NCAA Division I schools behind the University of Louisville and second most in the Atlantic Sun Conference behind Florida Gulf Coast. Todd also became one of two coaches, joining hall of fame head coach Rick Insell with Middle Tennessee Blue Raiders, in NCAA history to have over 325 wins at the high school and collegiate ranks.

== Head coaching record ==
Record table
Season	Team	Overall	Conference	Standing	Postseason
1992–99	Berea Community HS	166–54			
1999–2006	Lexington Catholic HS	225–28			3 State Champions
2 High Schools:		391–82			
Transylvania University (Heartland Collegiate Athletic Conference) (2006–2014)
2006–07	Transylvania	19–9	12–4	3rd	NCAA Division III 1st Round
2007–08	Transylvania	15–12	10–6	3rd	
2008–09	Transylvania	23–6	14–2	1st	NCAA Division III 2nd Round
2009–10	Transylvania	19–7	13–4	2nd	
2010–11	Transylvania	20–8	13–5	2nd	
2011–12	Transylvania	14–13	11–7	4th	
2012–13	Transylvania	21–6	16–2	1st	
2013–14	Transylvania	26–3	17–1	1st	NCAA Division III 2nd Round
Transylvania Pioneers:		157–64 (.710)	106–31 (.774)		
Morehead State University (Ohio Valley Conference) (2014–2021)
2014–15	Morehead State	12–18	8–8	6th	
2015–16	Morehead State	10–20	4–12	11th	
2016–17	Morehead State	21–10	11–5	2nd	WNIT 1st Round
2017–18	Morehead State	21–11	12–6	4th	
2018–19	Morehead State	24–11	13–5	2nd	WNIT 2nd Round
2019–20	Morehead State	10–20	6–12	9th	
2020–21	Morehead State	7–16	6–13	10th	
Morehead State Eagles:		105–106 (.498)	60–61 (.496)		
Eastern Kentucky University (ASUN Conference) (2021–2026)
2021–22	Eastern Kentucky	15–16	7–9	7th	
2022–23	Eastern Kentucky	18–14	11–7	5th	
2023–24	Eastern Kentucky	22–12	9–7	5th	WNIT 1st Round
2024–25	Eastern Kentucky	21–12	10–8	4th	
2025–26	Eastern Kentucky	25–9	15–3	1st	WBIT Second Round
Eastern Kentucky Colonels:		101–63 (.616)	52–34 (.605)		
Total:		363–233 (.609)			
National champion Postseason invitational champion Conference regular season champion Conference regular season and conference tournament champion Division regular season champion Division regular season and conference tournament champion Conference tournament champion

- OVC Women's Basketball Standings
- Morehead State Schedule
- EKU Schedule
