= Estill County Schools =

School district in Kentucky, United States

Address
- 253 Main Street Irvine, Estill County, Kentucky, 40336; United States
- Coordinates: 37°42′12″N 83°58′35″W

District information
- Type: Public
- Grades: Pre-K-12
- Superintendent: Charlie Brock
- NCES District ID: 2101760

Students and staff
- Students: 2,144 (2021–2022)
- Student–teacher ratio: 14:71

Other information
- Website: www.estill.kyschools.us

The Estill County School District is a school district based within Irvine, Kentucky. Currently, all of the schools in Estill County Schools are based within Irvine. Estill County Schools is made up of 5 schools, including one high school, one middle school, two elementary schools, and one preschool facility.

== Preschool facilities ==
- South Irvine Early Learning Center

== Elementary schools ==
- West Irvine Elementary School
- Estill Springs Elementary School

== Middle schools ==
- Estill County Middle School

== High schools ==
- Estill County High School
