= Madison Southern High School =

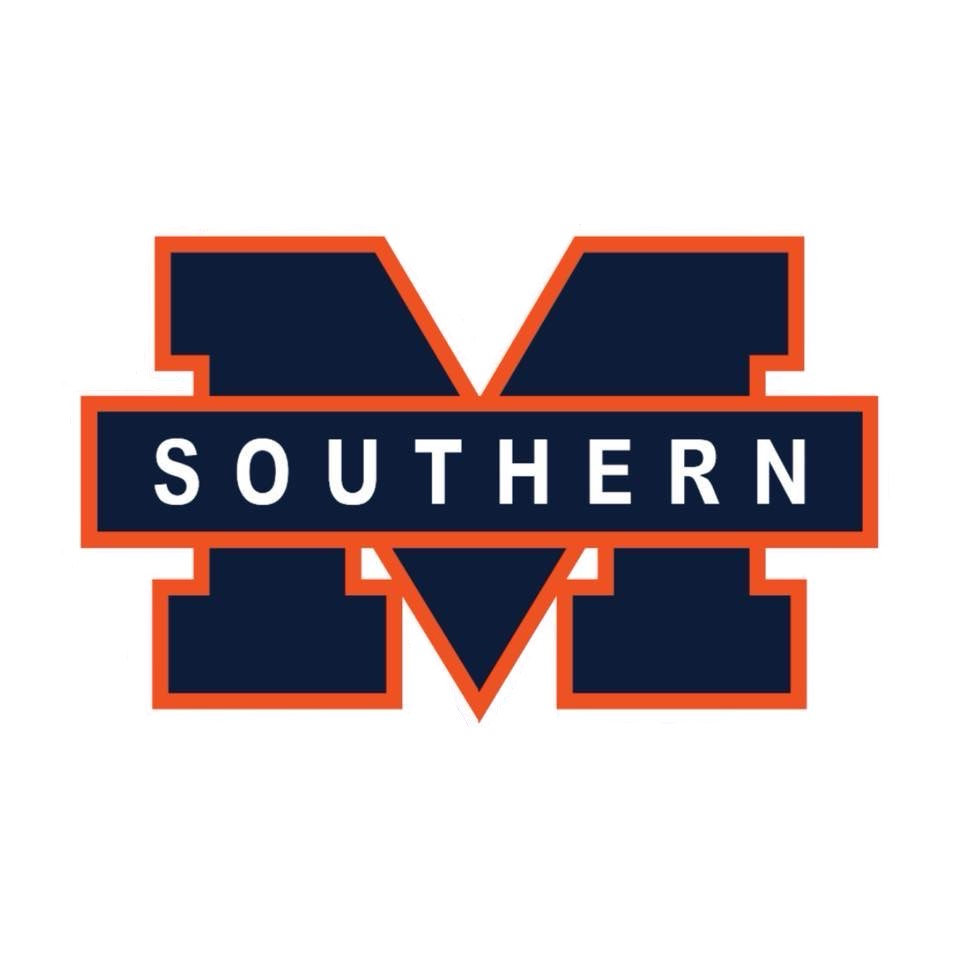

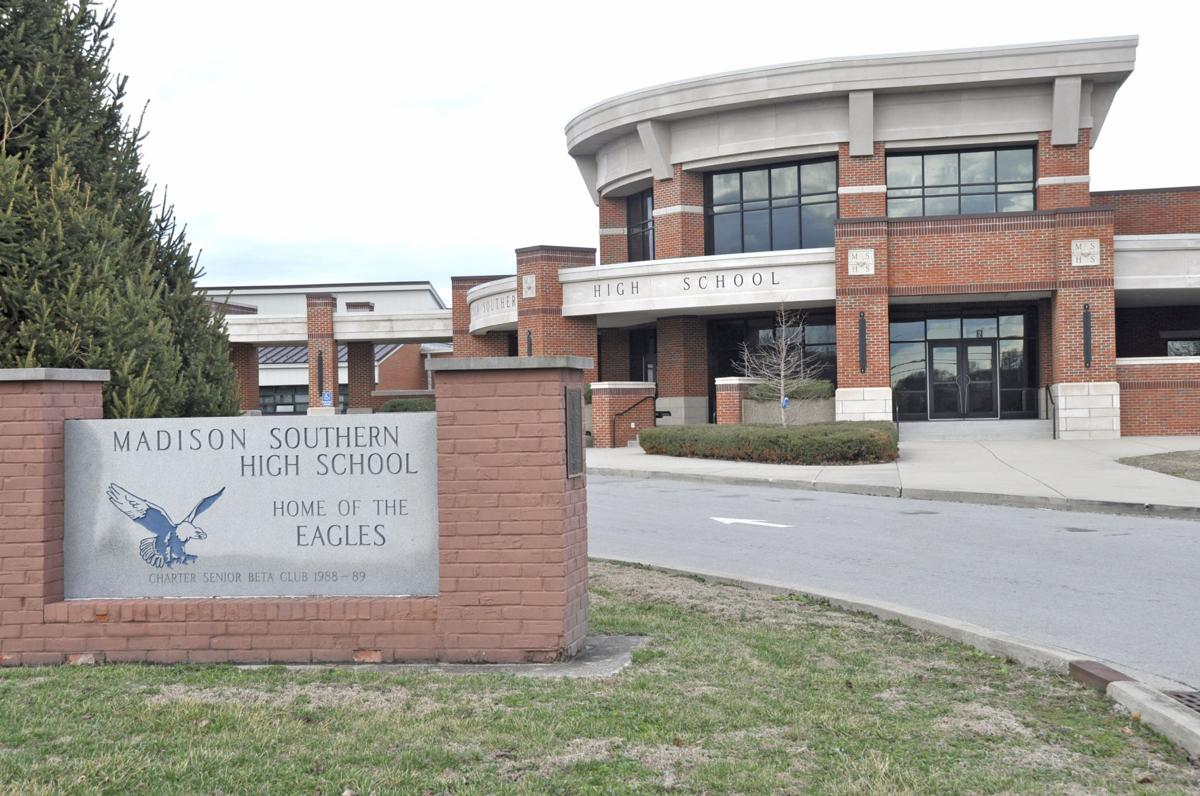
- The Front of Madison Southern High School with the 1988 Beta Club Marker

Location
- 279 Glades Road; Berea, Kentucky 40403; United States; 37°35′15″N 84°17′18″W

Information
- Type: Public high school
- Motto: "Home of the Madison Southern Eagles"
- Opened: c. 1987
- Status: Open
- School district: Madison County Schools
- Superintendent: Randy Neely
- Head Principal: Jeremy Phillips
- Teaching staff: 66.75 (on an FTE basis)
- Grades: 9-12
- Secondary years taught: 9th-12th
- Gender: Co-educational
- Enrollment: 1,230 (2023-24)
- Student to teacher ratio: 18.43
- Language: English and Spanish
- Hours in school day: 7 hours
- Colors: orange, navy blue
- Fight song: Madison Southern Fight Song
- Athletics conference: KMEA District 11 Class 4A KHSAA District 44 KHSAA 5A District 7 KHSAA Region Nine
- Sports: Archery, baseball, basketball, bowling, bass fishing, cheerleading, cross country, dance, football, golf, tennis, track, soccer, softball, swimming, volleyball, wrestling, marching band and winter guard (Marching band and winter guard are considered sports at Madison Southern.)
- Mascot: Southern Eagle
- Nickname: Eagles and Lady Eagles
- Rival: Madison Central High School
- National ranking: 2,343rd (by US News)
- Yearbook: The Talon
- School fees: USD$45 per educational year
- Feeder schools: Farristown Middle School and Foley Middle School
- Website: mshs.madison.kyschools.us

Madison Southern High School is a public high school located in Berea, Kentucky, United States. The school mascot is the Eagles, with the school colors being orange and navy blue. It is one of four high schools in Madison County, Kentucky. It is one of two high schools in the Madison County School System. According to the US News and as of 2025, Madison Southern ranks 2,343rd place in Best High Schools in the US, 61st in Best Kentucky High Schools and 1st in the Richmond, KY Metro Area High Schools. Madison Southern has a variety of nicknames amongst the student body and overall, The Commonwealth of Kentucky, having their school nicknames being Mad South, MadiSouth, "The cousin down South (usually for students attending Madison Central)" and Southern. Madison Southern also has the commonly mistaken alias of "Madison Central", usually at sporting events where the school is judged, like in Cheerleading or Marching Band.

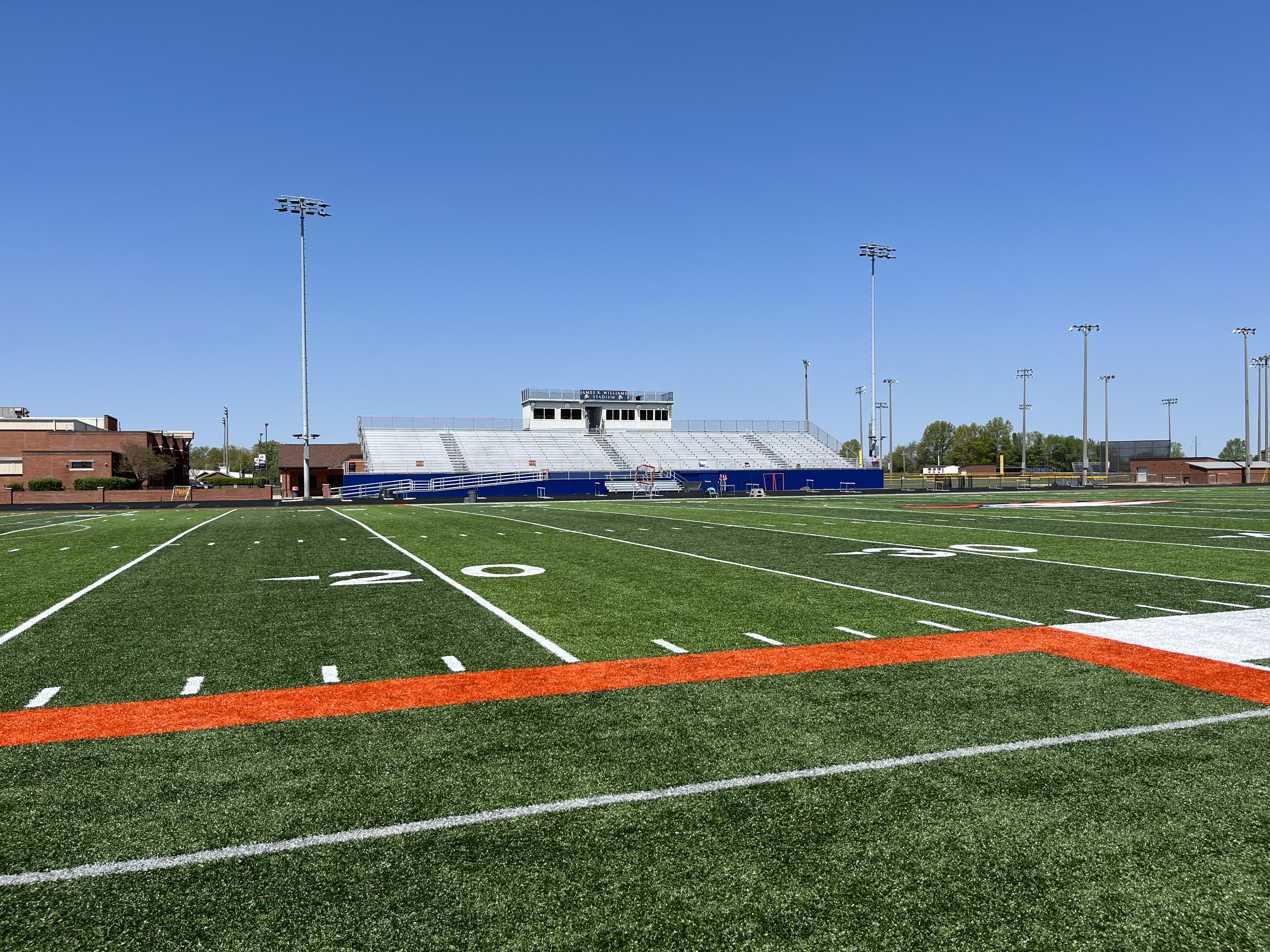
James R. Williams Stadium at the Eagles Football field

== Notable alumni ==
- Luke Stocker, tight end for the University of Tennessee
- Damien Harris, retired running back for the New England Patriots and Buffalo Bills
- Jared Carpenter, Republican member of the Kentucky Senate, All-state basketball player for Madison Southern.

== Stadiums ==
- The Eagles Football Stadium is named after former Madison County Schools Board Member James R. Williams after the school's expansion project in circa. 1990s, naming the football field "James R. Williams Stadium".
- The Eagles Basketball Gymnasium is named "J. B. Moore Stadium"

== Awards ==
Madison Southern Marching Band Directors with KMEA State Championships Appearances (3)

- David J. Thompson (1989, 1990, 1991, 1992, 1994)
- David M. Ratliff (2006, 2007, 2008, 2009, 2010, 2011, 2012, 2013, 2014, 2015, 2016, 2017, 2018, 2019, 2021, 2023, 2024)
- Martina N. Sanders (incumbent) (2025)

Madison Southern KMEA Marching Band Championships (2)

Class A

- 1991 (84.35)
- 1992 (87.28)

Madison Southern KMEA Marching Band Distinguished Rankings (14)

To receive a distinguished trophy from KMEA, The band MUST get a score of 80 or higher at a state-sanctioned competition.

Class A (6)

- 1989 (Semifinals, 83.28)
- 1991 (Semifinals and Round Champion, 90.70)
- 1991 (Finals and State Champion, 84.35)
- 1992 (Semifinals and Reserve Champion, 86.83)
- 1992 (Finals and State Champion, 87.28)
- 1994 (Semifinals, 82.50)

Class AAA (3)

- 2021 (Quarterfinals and Reserve Champion, 87.30)
- 2021 (Semifinals, 81.55)
- 2021 (Finals, 84.55)

Class AAAA (6)

- 2010 (Semifinals, 81.98)
- 2013 (Semifinals, 80.20)
- 2014 (Quarterfinals, 83.40)
- 2014 (Semifinals, 85.45)
- 2023 (Quarterfinals, 81.20)
- 2025 (Semifinals, 83.40)

Boys Basketball (3)

District Champion

- 2016/2017 (vs. Madison Central)
- 2021/2022 (vs. Madison Central)
- 2023/2024 (vs. Madison Central)

Girls Basketball (6)

District Champion

- 2006/2007 (vs. Berea Community)
- 2014/2015 (vs. Model Laboratory)
- 2018/2019 (vs. Madison Central)
- 2020/2021 (vs. Madison Central)
- 2021/2022 (vs. Berea Community)
- 2025/2026 (vs. Berea Community)
