= Damien Harris =

American football player (born 1997)

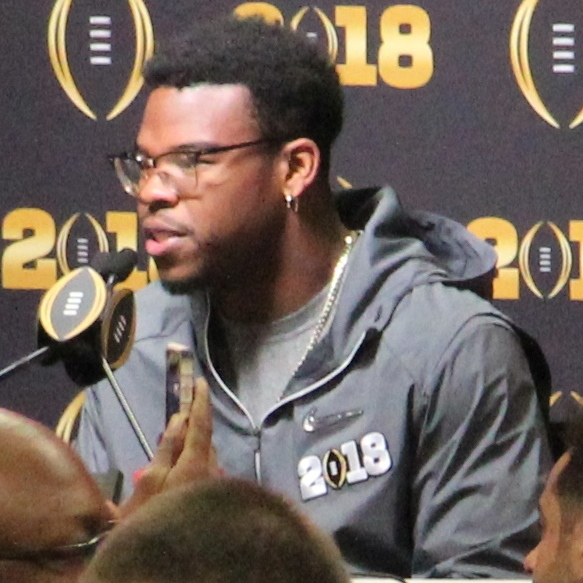
- Harris in 2018

No. 37, 22
- Position: Running back

Personal information
- Born: February 11, 1997 (age 29); Richmond, Kentucky, U.S.
- Listed height: 5 ft 11 in (1.80 m)
- Listed weight: 213 lb (97 kg)

Career information
- High school: Madison Southern (Berea, Kentucky)
- College: Alabama (2015–2018)
- NFL draft: 2019: 3rd round, 87th overall pick

Career history
- New England Patriots (2019–2022); Buffalo Bills (2023)

Awards and highlights
- 2× CFP national champion (2015, 2017); Second-team All-SEC (2018)

Career NFL statistics
- Rushing yards: 2,188
- Rushing average: 4.6
- Rushing touchdowns: 21
- Receptions: 42
- Receiving yards: 297
- Stats at Pro Football Reference

Damien Harris (born February 11, 1997) is an American former professional football player who was a running back in the National Football League (NFL). He played college football for the Alabama Crimson Tide, where he was a two-time national champion. He was selected by the New England Patriots in the third round of the 2019 NFL draft, and played five seasons in the National Football League (NFL) for the Patriots and Buffalo Bills.

== Early life ==
Harris attended Madison Southern High School in Berea, Kentucky. During his high school football career, he rushed for 6,748 yards with 122 touchdowns. He was rated by the Rivals.com recruiting network as a five-star recruit. Harris was ranked as the top running back and the eighth best overall player in his class. Harris committed to the University of Alabama to play college football under head coach Nick Saban.

== College career ==
Harris was a backup to Derrick Henry as a true freshman at Alabama in 2015. He played in 12 games and rushed for 157 yards on 46 carries.

With Henry leaving for the NFL, Harris became Alabama's starting running back in 2016, beating out Bo Scarbrough. In his first career start against USC in the season opener, he rushed for 138 yards on nine carries. In the third game, against Ole Miss, Harris carried 16 times for 144 yards, including a 67-yard run in which he out-muscled two defenders. A sprained knee against Kent State on September 24 caused him to sit out the rest of the game, but he returned the following week against Kentucky. Against Arkansas on October 8, Harris had 122 yards rushing, 60 yards receiving, and a touchdown reception. Harris had his fourth 100-yard game of the season against Texas A&M, rushing for 125 yards on 18 carries. He finished the 2016 season with 120 carries for 790 yards and one touchdown.

On September 23, 2017, in a 59–0 win over Vanderbilt, Harris had 12 carries for 151 yards and three touchdowns. On October 14, against Arkansas, he had nine carries for 125 yards and two touchdowns in the 41–9 victory. In the 2017 season, Harris finished with 135 carries for 1,000 yards and 11 touchdowns in 14 games.

On October 6, 2018, Harris had 15 carries for 111 yards and two touchdowns in a 65–31 win on the road at Arkansas. In the 2018 season, Harris finished with 150 carries for 876 yards and nine touchdowns in 15 games. He had an expanded role in the receiving game with 22 receptions for 204 yards.

Harris graduated in December 2018.

== Professional career ==
Pre-draft measurables
Height	Weight	Arm length	Hand span	Wingspan	40-yard dash	10-yard split	20-yard split	Vertical jump	Broad jump	Bench press
5 ft 10 1/8 in (1.78 m)	216 lb (98 kg)	30 3/4 in (0.78 m)	9 3/4 in (0.25 m)	6 ft 0 7/8 in (1.85 m)	4.57 s	1.56 s	2.71 s	37 in (0.94 m)	10 ft 1 in (3.07 m)	16 reps
All values from NFL Combine

=== New England Patriots ===
Harris was selected by the New England Patriots in the third round with the 87th overall pick of the 2019 NFL draft. He made his professional debut in the team's Week 7 33–0 victory over the New York Jets, rushing for 12 yards on four carries. It would be his only carries for the season as he was a healthy scratch for most of his rookie season.

On September 7, 2020, Harris was placed on injured reserve with a broken finger. He was activated on October 5, 2020. In Week 4 against the Kansas City Chiefs, he had 17 carries for 100 rushing yards in the 26–10 loss. In Week 8, against the Buffalo Bills, he had 16 carries for 102 rushing yards and his first career rushing touchdown in the 24–21 loss. In Week 10, Harris rushed the ball 22 times for 121 yards, both career highs, helping lead the Patriots to a 23–17 upset victory over the Baltimore Ravens on Sunday Night Football. He was placed back on injured reserve on January 2, 2021. He finished the season as the Patriot's leading rusher with 691 yards and two touchdowns through 10 games.

Harris was the team's primary starter for the 2021 season. He started the first nine games of the season, though a concussion sustained in Week 9 kept him out of the Week 10 game against the Cleveland Browns. He returned as the starter for Week 11. He had 100+ yard performances in Week 1 against the Miami Dolphins, Week 6 against the Dallas Cowboys, and Week 7 against the New York Jets. He was mostly ineffectual, however, during the Week 3 and 4 losses against the New Orleans Saints and the Tampa Bay Buccaneers respectively, being held to only 10 total yards rushing combined between the two games. Starting in Week 8, he began to split carries with backup Rhamondre Stevenson. He finished the season with a career-high 929 rushing yards and was second in the league with 15 rushing touchdowns.

Harris entered the 2022 season as the Patriots starting running back, with Rhamondre Stevenson close behind him. A hamstring injury suffered in Week 5 slowed down his production and allowed Stevenson to overtake him as the lead back, but still split carries with the second-year player. He suffered a thigh injury in Week 12 and missed the next four games. He finished the season with 462 rushing yards and three touchdowns.

=== Buffalo Bills ===
On March 21, 2023, Harris signed a one-year, $1.7 million contract with the Buffalo Bills. Harris scored his first touchdown as a Bill during a 38–10 Buffalo win against the Las Vegas Raiders in week 2. During week 6 against the New York Giants, Harris was injured after he collided with Giants linebacker Bobby Okereke on what would be his only carry of the game. He was taken off the field via ambulance and was later diagnosed with a neck sprain. He was placed on injured reserve on October 20. He became a free agent after the 2023 season.

Harris announced his retirement from professional football via Instagram on March 25, 2024.

== Personal life ==
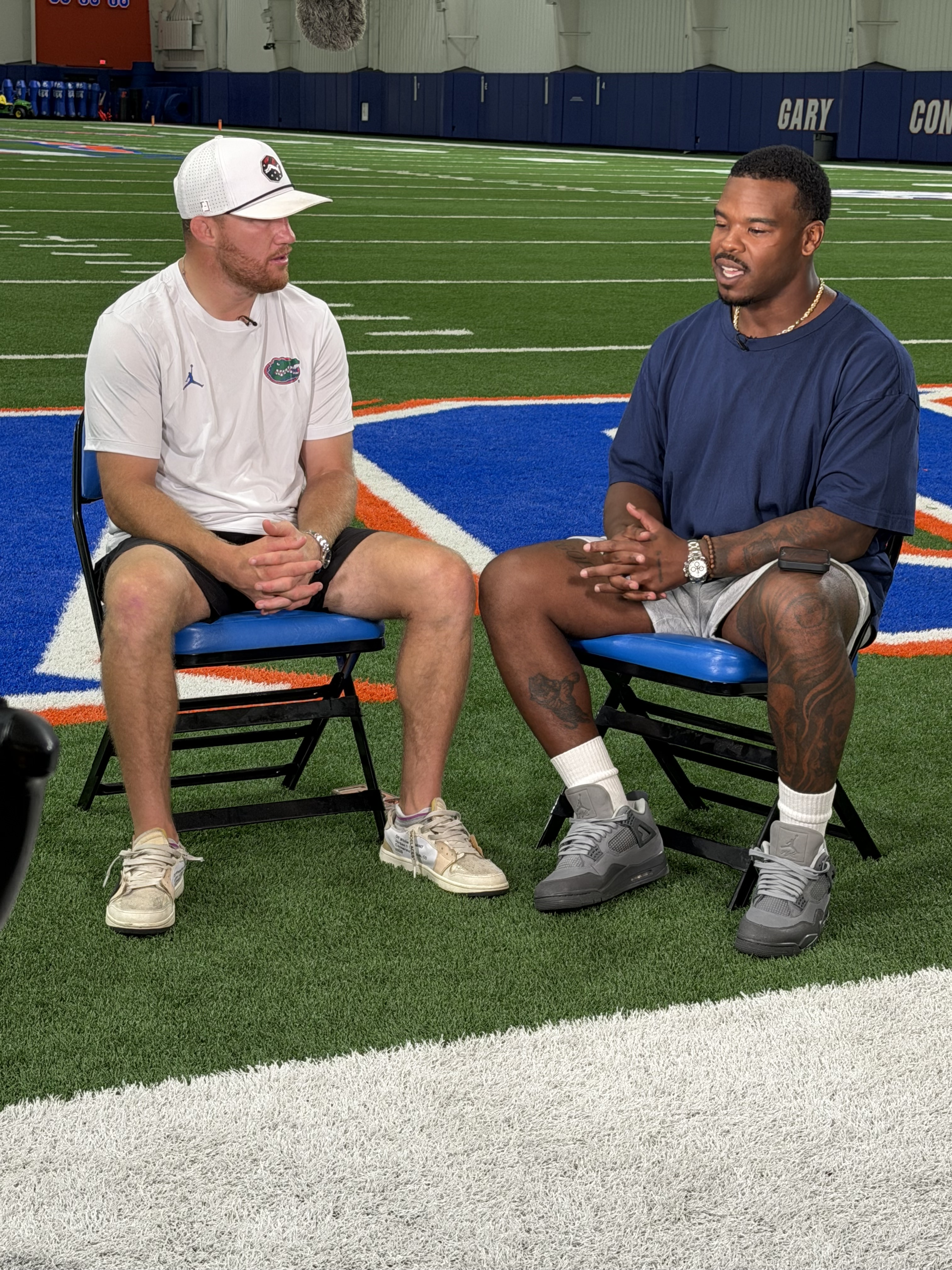
Damien Harris interviewing Justin Gaethje with CBS Sports

Damien Harris is a college football and NFL analyst with CBS Sports and CBS Sports HQ.

== Career statistics ==
=== NFL ===
==== Regular season ====
Year	Team	Games		Rushing					Receiving					Fumbles	
Year	Team	GP	GS	Att	Yds	Avg	Lng	TD	Rec	Yds	Avg	Lng	TD	Fum	Lost
2019	NE	2	0	4	12	3.0	13	0	0	0	0.0	0	0	0	0
2020	NE	10	10	137	691	5.0	41	2	5	52	10.4	15	0	1	0
2021	NE	15	15	202	929	4.6	64	15	18	132	7.3	21	0	2	2
2022	NE	11	9	106	462	4.4	30	3	17	97	5.7	15	0	0	0
2023	BUF	6	0	23	94	4.1	11	1	2	16	8.0	13	0	0	0
Career		44	34	472	2,188	4.6	64	21	42	297	7.1	21	0	3	2

==== Postseason ====
Year	Team	Games		Rushing					Receiving					Fumbles	
Year	Team	GP	GS	Att	Yds	Avg	Lng	TD	Rec	Yds	Avg	Lng	TD	Fum	Lost
2021	NE	1	1	9	30	3.3	14	0	1	7	7.0	7	0	0	0
2023	BUF	0	0	Did not play due to injury											
Career		1	1	9	30	3.3	14	0	1	7	7.0	7	0	0	0

=== College ===
Season	Team	GP	Rushing					Receiving				
Season	Team	GP	Att	Yds	Avg	Lng	TD	Rec	Yds	Avg	Lng	TD
2015	Alabama	10	46	157	3.4	41	1	4	13	3.3	8	0
2016	Alabama	15	145	1,040	7.2	73	2	14	99	7.1	56	2
2017	Alabama	14	135	1,000	7.4	75	11	12	91	7.6	17	0
2018	Alabama	15	150	876	5.8	73	9	22	204	9.3	52	0
Career		54	477	3,070	6.4	75	23	52	407	7.8	56	2
