= Irvine, Kentucky =

- City
- Downtown Irvine

- Location of Irvine in Estill County, Kentucky.
- Coordinates: 37°41′49″N 83°58′1″W
- Country: United States
- State: Kentucky
- County: Estill
- Named for: William Irvine, an area pioneer

Area
  - Total: 1.53 sq mi (3.97 km^{2})
  - Land: 1.46 sq mi (3.78 km^{2})
  - Water: 0.073 sq mi (0.19 km^{2})
- Elevation: 679 ft (207 m)

Population (2020)
  - Total: 2,360
  - Estimate (2022): 2,311 ▼
  - Density: 1,620/sq mi (624/km^{2})
- Time zone: UTC-5 (Eastern (EST))
  - Summer (DST): UTC-4 (EDT)
- ZIP codes: 40336, 40472
- Area code: 606
- FIPS code: 21-39646
- GNIS feature ID: 0512925
- Website: https://www.irvinekentucky.gov/

Irvine (locally /ˈɜːrvən, ˈɜːrvaɪn/) is a home rule-class city in and the county seat of Estill County, Kentucky, in the United States. As of the 2020 census, Irvine had a population of 2,360.

== Geography ==
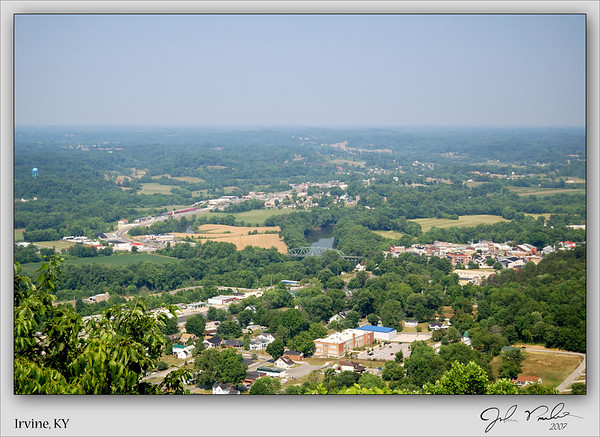
Panorama from atop Rockhouse Mountain

Irvine is located in the center of Estill County at 37°41′49″N 83°58′1″W (37.696835, -83.966895). The city limits are on the northeast side of the Kentucky River, and the city is bordered by Ravenna to the southeast. According to the United States Census Bureau, Irvine has a total area of 1.49 square miles (3.85 km^{2}), of which 1.41 square miles (3.65 km^{2}) is land and 0.077 square miles (0.20 km^{2}), or 5.13%, is water.

== History ==
Another panorama from atop Rockhouse Mountain

Gen. Green Clay established the town of Irvine on 20.5 acres (8.3 ha) of his land on January 28, 1812, four years after Estill County was separated from Madison County. It was named for Col. William Irvine, a pioneer settler of Madison County. The post office was established in 1813, and the city was incorporated by the state legislature in 1849.

== Demographics ==
Historical population
Census	Pop.	Note	%±
1830	91		—
1860	234		—
1870	224		−4.3%
1900	260		—
1910	272		4.6%
1920	2,705		894.5%
1930	3,640		34.6%
1940	3,631		−0.2%
1950	3,259		−10.2%
1960	2,955		−9.3%
1970	2,918		−1.3%
1980	2,889		−1.0%
1990	2,836		−1.8%
2000	2,843		0.2%
2010	2,715		−4.5%
2020	2,360		−13.1%
2022 (est.)	2,311		−2.1%
U.S. Decennial Census

=== 2020 census ===
As of the 2020 census, Irvine had a population of 2,360. The median age was 42.8 years. 22.8% of residents were under the age of 18 and 20.1% of residents were 65 years of age or older. For every 100 females there were 83.9 males, and for every 100 females age 18 and over there were 79.8 males age 18 and over.

99.8% of residents lived in urban areas, while 0.2% lived in rural areas.

There were 1,071 households in Irvine, of which 28.0% had children under the age of 18 living in them. Of all households, 32.6% were married-couple households, 19.4% were households with a male householder and no spouse or partner present, and 40.7% were households with a female householder and no spouse or partner present. About 37.1% of all households were made up of individuals and 15.8% had someone living alone who was 65 years of age or older.

There were 1,272 housing units, of which 15.8% were vacant. The homeowner vacancy rate was 3.6% and the rental vacancy rate was 4.9%.

Racial composition as of the 2020 census
Race	Number	Percent
White	2,286	96.9%
Black or African American	9	0.4%
American Indian and Alaska Native	9	0.4%
Asian	0	0.0%
Native Hawaiian and Other Pacific Islander	0	0.0%
Some other race	3	0.1%
Two or more races	53	2.2%
Hispanic or Latino (of any race)	29	1.2%

=== 2000 census ===
As of the 2000 census, there were 2,843 people, 1,259 households, and 793 families residing in the city. The population density was 1,871.7/sq mi (722.7/km^{2}). There were 1,409 housing units at an average density of 927.6/sq mi (358.1/km^{2}). The racial makeup of the city was 99.26% White, 0.04% African American, 0.21% Native American, 0.04% from other races, and 0.46% from two or more races. Hispanic or Latino of any race were 0.56% of the population.

There were 1,259 households, out of which 26.9% had children under the age of 18 living with them, 42.7% were married couples living together, 17.2% had a female householder with no husband present, and 37.0% were non-families. 33.7% of all households were made up of individuals, and 17.5% had someone living alone who was 65 years of age or older. The average household size was 2.22 and the average family size was 2.82.

22.9% of the population was under the age of 18, 8.0% from 18 to 24, 27.7% from 25 to 44, 23.0% from 45 to 64, and 18.5% who were 65 years of age or older. The median age was 39 years. For every 100 females, there were 83.9 males. For every 100 females age 18 and over, there were 77.2 males.

The median income for a household in the city was $20,286, and the median income for a family was $25,046. Males had a median income of $28,988 versus $17,194 for females. The per capita income for the city was $14,075. About 20.9% of families and 28.2% of the population were below the poverty line, including 25.4% of those under age 18 and 22.0% of those age 65 or over.

== Economy ==
Major employers include Carhartt. Mercy Health Partners operates Marcum and Wallace Memorial Hospital in Irvine.

== Notable people ==
- Harry Dean Stanton – American actor (1926–2017)

== Education ==
Irvine has a lending library, the Estill County Public Library.

The Estill County Schools includes Estill County High School.
