= Berea Independent Schools =

School district in Kentucky, United States

Coordinates: 37.57907°N 84.29440°W

Location
- 3 Pirate Pkwy Berea, KY, 40403; United States

District information
- Grades: PK–12
- Superintendent: Diane Hatchett
- Schools: 3
- NCES District ID: 2100480

Students and staff
- Students: 1,094 (2021-22)
- Teachers: 77 (FTE)
- Student–teacher ratio: 15.06

Berea Independent Schools is a school district serving Berea, Kentucky, United States. The superintendent was Dr. Dianne Hatchet until she announced her retirement in January, 2025. The school sports teams are called "Pirates".

== Elementary schools ==
Berea Community Elementary School (Grades PK-5)

== Middle schools ==
Berea Community Middle School (Grades 6–8)

== Berea Community High School ==
Berea Community High School (Berea Community, BCHS or sometimes Berea Independent) is located in Berea, Kentucky, United States. Current attendance is approximately 350-400 students for grades 9 through 12.

School sports include varsity Baseball, Archery, Cheerleading, Cross Country, Softball, swimming, Volleyball, American football, soccer, basketball, tennis, track and field, golf, and academic team, which competes at Governor's Cup.

The school also offers many clubs for students, including National Beta Club, Student Council, National Honor Society, FCA, GSA, FCCLA, FBLA, FEA, and Spanish Club.

Berea Community is also a participant in Madison County Schools' Ignite Academy

=== History ===
In the late 1960s, the city of Berea and Berea College worked together to build a new school to replace the city system schools, Berea Elementary and High School, and the college owned schools, Knapp Hall and Berea Foundation School. College-owned property along Walnut Meadow road was chosen as the site for the new school. Construction of the high school (and, concurrently, the elementary school) began in 1969 and was completed in time for the 1969–1970 school year.

=== Present day ===
Berea added a second gym, mainly for the use of the elementary, to complement the current Berea gym, Singleton Gym. A wing of classrooms for middle school was also added, and nicknamed "The Pirate Cove". Walls were also added to both the elementary, middle school, and high school classrooms. During the same year, a proposal was made to implement random student drug testing. Drug testing began in 2009.

In late 2009, the Conkin Gym was completed, as was the other construction. Both basketball teams now play in the Conkin Gym.

=== Berea Pirate athletics ===
The 1998 Lady Pirate basketball team finished the year placing third in the state championship competition. The head coach was Greg Todd, who currently is the head basketball coach at Morehead State University in Morehead. On January 19, 2008, the team was reunited, for the first time ever, for their 10th anniversary at the halftime of Berea vs. Madison Central.

The Berea Lady Pirates Basketball team returned to their old reputation of victorious play in the 2018–2019 season under Coach Dammian Stepp. The team defeated cross-county rival Madison Central for the first time in over a decade on December 17, 2018. The Pirates then went to compete in the 11th region All-A tournament, defeating Model Laboratory in the semi-finals, and then an energetic bunch from Frankfort Independent in the final. The Lady Pirates hadn't brought home the trophy since 2008, but they then went on to beat Wolfe County at the All-A State Tournament. Unfortunately, the young team was defeated by the Lady Comets of West Carter on January 25, 2019.

The cross country and track teams have seen great successes, with individual state champions numerous times throughout the late 1970s and early 1980s. After a long dry spell, the cross country team took the regional runner-up in 2011 and h took the title in 2012. and 2013. In the 2000s, the cross country team has finished as high as 11th at the KHSAA state cross country championships, and finished 16th in 2013.
