= Matthew Campbell (minister) =

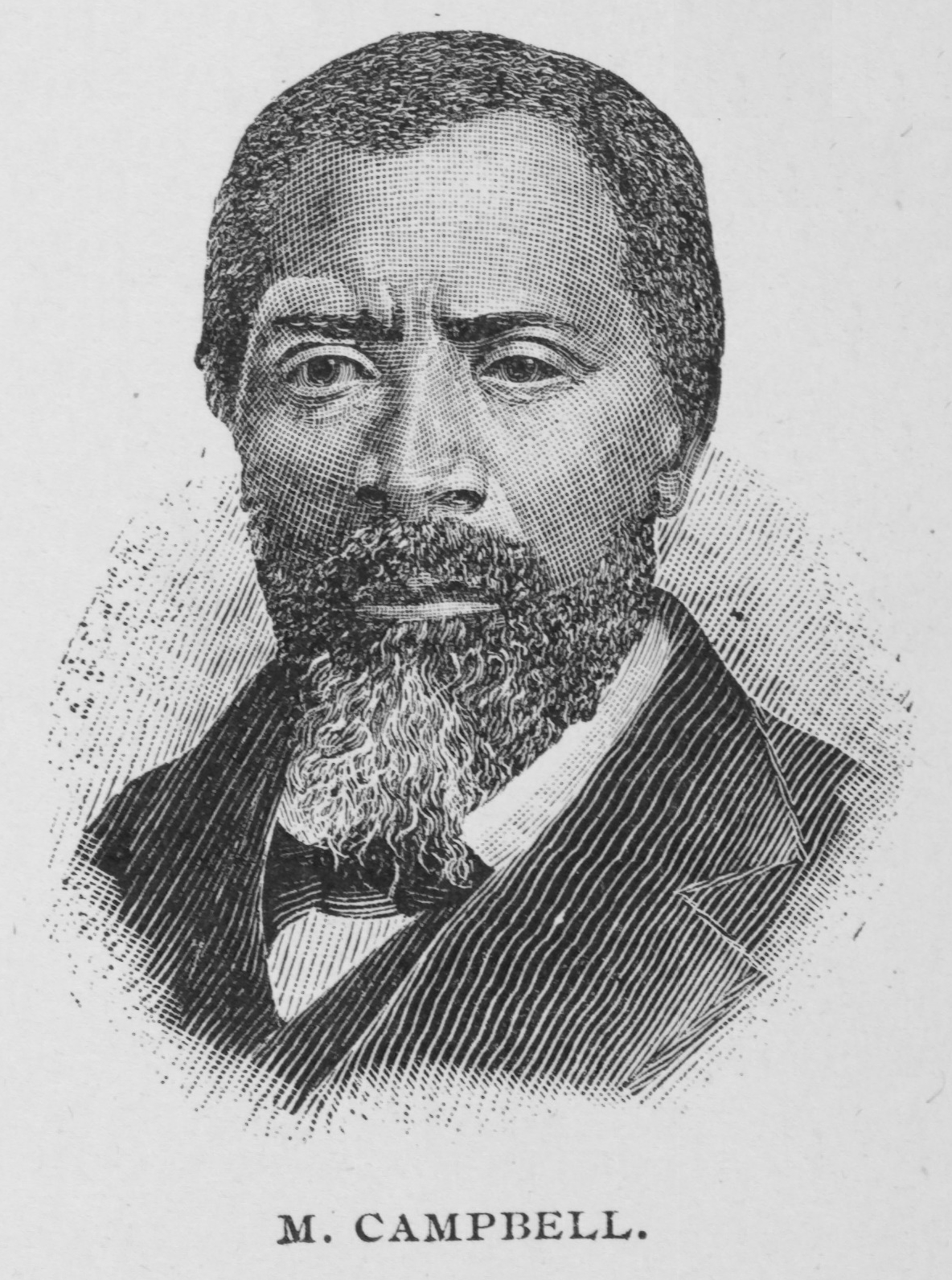
- Campbell in 1887
- Born: September 1, 1823; Madison County, Kentucky, U.S.
- Died: September 19, 1897 (aged 74); Madison County, Kentucky, U.S.
- Other name: Madison Campbell
- Occupation: Minister
- Political party: Republican
- Spouses: Polly Woods Ballard, Roxana Moberly

Religious life
- Religion: Baptist

Matthew Campbell, or Madison Campbell (September 1, 1823 – September 19, 1897), was a Baptist preacher in Richmond, Kentucky. He was a local religious and political leader and helped organize a number of churches.

== Early life ==
Matthew Campbell was born a slave to Jackson and Lucy Campbell on September 1, 1823, in Madison County, Kentucky. Jackson was born January 15, 1797, and Lucy in 1803. Campbell lived near his extended family. His maternal grandfather, Aaron, and maternal great-grandparents, Tobias and Mato, lived nearby and all were emancipated before their deaths, Aaron purchasing his freedom and Tobias and Mato being emancipated in their old age. Campbell's paternal grandparents were named Daniel and Lydia. The master of the family was Audley Campbell.

Campbell joined the Baptist church on September 16, 1841, under the influence of Edmund Martin in Richmond, Kentucky, but his master, who was a Methodist, required him to hold that denomination. In August 1842, Campbell began to preach and in 1844 he was licensed to preach in the Methodist Church. He preached at the interracial Bethlehem Methodist Church for about a decade. His master died in 1851 and he joined the Baptist church and in 1856 Campbell was baptized by Rev. Jacob Bush, who had followed Martin as pastor. In August 1857, he was ordained in Lincoln County, Kentucky, by a council of the Tates Creek Association of (white) Baptists which included Rev. G. W. Broadus, Rev. Andrew Broadus, and Rev. John Higgins. On June 20, 1858, he became pastor of the First Colored Baptist Church in Richmond, following Rev. Bush. He learned to read and write later in life with the aid of his father and white children in the neighborhood. Campbell and his congregation faced frequent violent attacks during this period.

== Family ==
January 21, 1843, Campbell married Polly Woods Ballard. Polly died in 1894 and Campbell remarried the widowed Roxana Moberly. He was the father of fourteen children.

== Freedom and career ==
In 1863, during the American Civil War (1861 to 1865), Campbell purchased his freedom for $233 and hired his wife. Campbell and his wife worked for government clerks in Nicholasville, Kentucky, near Camp Nelson, with half of his wife's earnings going to her slaveholder. Campbell was a very active leader in the church and organized three other churches at Mt. Pleasant, Otter Creek, Mt. Nebo, New Liberty Baptist in Bobtown (in 1866), Kirksville, and Goodloe Chapel. He helped establish the Baptist Church South Elkhorn District and the Mt. Pleasant District Association, and was involved in the 1870 meeting of the General Association of Baptists in Kentucky which led to the formation of Simmons College of Kentucky. In 1892, he was awarded a doctor of divinity degree by the school. He was active in Republican politics and attended several local Republican Conventions. He also kept meticulous track of his activities as a minister. when he died it was reported that during his career he ordained 125 ministers and deacons, baptized 5,000, traveled 33,900 miles, and raised thousands of dollars. In 1895 he wrote an autobiography.

== Death ==
Campbell died on September 19, 1897, of gangrene. His funeral was conducted by Rev. T. H. Broaddus and Elder Smother. After he died, Judge Scott of the Circuit Court ordered the Adjournment of the Court in his honor, the first time such an honor was performed for a black person in Kentucky.

== Bibliography ==
- Madison Campbell, Autobiography of Eld. Madison Campbell: Pastor of the United Colored Baptist Church, Richmond, Kentucky, Pantograph Job Rooms, 1895

== Sources ==
- Lucas, Marion Brunson. A history of Blacks in Kentucky: From slavery to segregation, 1760–1891. Vol. 1. University Press of Kentucky, 2003.
