= Madison High School (Richmond, Kentucky) =

Coordinates: 37°44′42.6″N 84°17′44.3″W

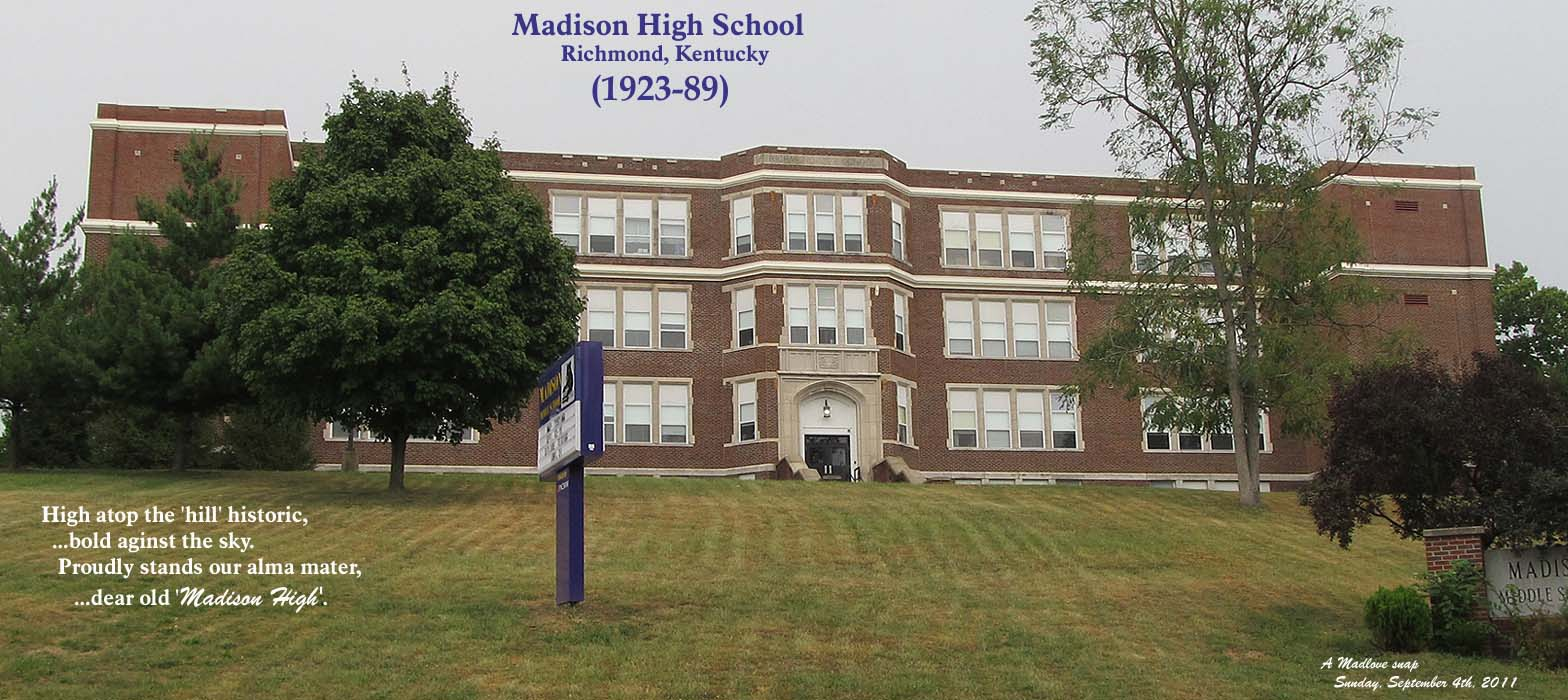

Location
- 101 Summit Street; Richmond, Kentucky 40475; United States

Information
- Other name: Madison High and Elementary School; Madison Female Institute
- Type: Public
- Established: 1921
- Closed: 1989 (Re-opened as Madison Middle School)
- Colors: Purple and White
- Song: Washington and Lee Swing
- Nickname: Royal Purples

Madison High School (1921–1989) was a public high school in Richmond, Kentucky (Madison County, Kentucky). The school's enrollment (grades 9–12) never exceeded 400 and it never graduated a class of more than 85 students in its 68-year existence. The official name of the school was Madison High and Elementary School.

== History ==
The transition from private to public school was rather gradual in Richmond. Between 1789 and 1910, several prominent academies flourished, but the public school system generally began on May 20, 1890, in an act of the general assembly of Kentucky. In that year the Richmond City School acquired the Madison Academy property, on which a new eight room building was dedicated in 1894. Several years later, two more rooms were added; and this building, known as Caldwell High School, was used for school purposes until 1921, when it was destroyed by fire.

On July 5, 1919, the Richmond city Board of Education leased the property of the Madison Female Institute for ninety-nine years. The Female Institute had been a famous southern finishing school for girls. Following the Civil War era Battle of Richmond, the building was used for hospital wards, where both Union and Confederate soldiers were cared for by teachers and students.

Caldwell was destroyed by fire on Wednesday, March 9, 1921. The Board of Education voted in favor of an $80,000 bond in order to erect a new building on the Madison Female Institute property. For the remainder of the school year and through the next two years (1921–1923), the school was forced to use the county courthouse and churches to hold classes. In the fall of 1923, the Madison High School building was completed at a cost of $250,000. At that time, it had thirty-one classrooms, one music room, a science laboratory, three rooms for domestic science and manual training, a large cafeteria, a library, two office rooms, an auditorium capable of seating about 900. An 800-seat gymnasium was added in 1927. In 1950, new classrooms were added to provide more space, but by 1955 the entire building was so crowded that it was necessary to have double sessions in several grades. Later some of the churches were used for the first grade students until the new elementary schools (Bellevue and Mayfield) were completed in 1959. In 1962, a $135,000 renovation of the building was initiated. New dressing and shower rooms were added to the gymnasium. A new cafeteria and superintendent office were completed in 1963.

For twenty-five years (1936 to 1961), the school formed a unique relationship with then Eastern Kentucky State Teachers College and its laboratory school, model. This was accomplished through the efforts of then EKSC president Herman L. Donovan and Richmond City Schools superintendent William F. O'Donnell. O'Donnell had been superintendent of Richmond City Schools since 1925 and later became President of Eastern in 1940. The schools were accredited jointly by the Southern Association of Secondary Schools as Madison-Model High School. The two divisions retained their respective organizations, but combined such activities as commencement, athletics, and music until the schools were separated after the 1960–1961 school year.

Through the 1955–1956 school year, Madison High was a segregated school. Richmond's African-American students attended Richmond High School (located on East Main Street). In the fall of 1956, Richmond High was integrated into Madison as the Richmond City Board of Education carried out the Supreme Court's Brown decision. A gradual integration program was initiated that year as sophomores, juniors and seniors from Richmond High were enrolled at Madison. By 1960, freshmen were admitted as well.

Richmond Junior High and Elementary remained open through the 1972–1973 school year. Beginning with the 1973–1974 school year through its closing after the 1988–1989 school year, the fifth through twelfth grades attended Madison. Bellevue Elementary was used exclusively for first and second graders while Mayfield Elementary housed the third and fourth grades. The Richmond City Board of Education received national recognition for this innovative move that integrated the entire district.

As Richmond grew and many citizens began to move to suburban locations on the outskirts of the Richmond City Schools district lines, a steady decline in enrollment gradually took place. By the 1980s, the school graduated (on the average) about 35 students a year. A combination of losing students to the Laboratory School, inability to expand the city school district (which resulted in a dwindling tax base) and the demographic trend known as white flight led to the decision to consolidate with the county system in 1989.

The school nickname (adopted in 1925) was the 'Royal Purples'. Its physical plant is now the site of Madison Middle School, which opened in the fall of 1992 (after extensive renovation) and is one of five middle schools (grades 6–8) in the Madison County school system. Initially, the Madison County Board of Education voted to adopt green and white as the new school colors, but (after protests from several Madison High alumni) changed the decision and opted to keep the old school colors (purple and white). They did, however, decide to change the school's nickname to Panthers.

== Notable alumni ==
- Garvice Kincaid, banker, attorney, financier, insurance company executive
- Goebel Ritter, professional basketball player
- Keith Bosley, professional football player

== Athletics ==
Madison-Model fielded several excellent football teams in its last five years before their partnership was dissolved.

New Eastern president Robert R. Martin took over from O'Donnell in the fall of 1960 and ended the partnership at the close of the school year. Roy Kidd had become the football coach in 1956 and the Purples recorded a 41–10–1 record over the next five years (1956–60). In their first year after separating from Model, Kidd's Royal Purples went 13–1 in 1961 and finished as the Class AA state-runner up to Fort Thomas Highlands. Three years later, coach Bobby Harville took Madison to the Class AA title game and again the Purples lost to Highlands (10–4 record).

In the 1970s, coach Monty Joe Lovell led the Royal Purples to the Class A state playoffs four times. The Purples lost in the state semi-finals in 1972 (12–1), 1978 (9–4) and finished as state-runner up to Bellevue in 1979 (10–3).

In its early football history, Madison finished as champions of central Kentucky in 1925. In 1924 and 1925, the Purples had a combined 15–4 record and defeated highly regarded Highlands in Thanksgiving Day matchups both seasons. Coach Velmar Miller led Madison to its last playoff appearance in 1985.

Madison participated in Kentucky's well-known State Basketball Tournament six times. This was quite an accomplishment when consideration of their placement in the KHSAA's 11th Region is taken into account. The 11th Region then included schools in Lexington (and continues to do so today), and along with the 6th and 7th Regions that include Louisville schools, is one of the most competitive in the state. Madison's initial trip to the tournament was in 1939 when coach Ralph Carlisle took the Purples to the state quarter-final round. Consecutive trips followed (then as Madison-Model) in 1944 and 1945 under coach Bob Ackerman. Ackerman led the Royal Purples to the 1947 11th Region title as well. Coach Ray Vencill led Madison to consecutive 11th Region championships in 1969 and 1970. In 1970, the underdog Purples nearly pulled off an upset in the state title game as they fell to powerful Male High School of Louisville 70–69 and finished as Kentucky's state runner-up. Forward Robert Brooks was named Kentucky's Mr. Basketball.

Madison-Model also participated in the state baseball tournament multiple times and finished as Kentucky state-runner-up in 1945 and 1946 (losing in the finals to parochial schools Louisville St. Xavier '45 and Newport Catholic '46). Led by coach Gwen Long, the Madison High girls' track and field team won first place at the Regional CKC championship in 1976, 1977, and in 1978 was crowned the Class A Kentucky state champion.

== Notable coaches ==
- Roy Kidd, football coach (1956–1961)
- Max Good, basketball coach (1970–1976)

=== State Football Playoffs ===
- 1961
- 1964
- 1971
- 1972
- 1978
- 1979
- 1985

=== State Basketball Sweet 16 ===
- 1939
- 1944
- 1945
- 1947
- 1969
- 1970

=== Football Bowl Appearances ===
Recreation Bowl Champion

- 1957
- 1961

Recreation Bowl Runner-Up

- 1958
- 1965

Big Sandy Bowl Runner-Up

- 1956

Scholarship Bowl Champion

- 1958

Laurel Bowl Champion

- 1973

CKC Champion

- 1956
- 1960
- 1961
- 1972

CKC Bowl Champion

- 1960
- 1961
- 1975

CKC Bowl Runner-Up

- 1964

Optimist Bowl Champion

- 1980

=== State Runner-Up ===
Class AA Football

- 1961
- 1964

Class A Football

- 1979

Basketball

- 1970

Baseball

- 1945
- 1946

=== State Champion ===
Girls' Track

- 1978
