= Madison Central High School (Kentucky) =

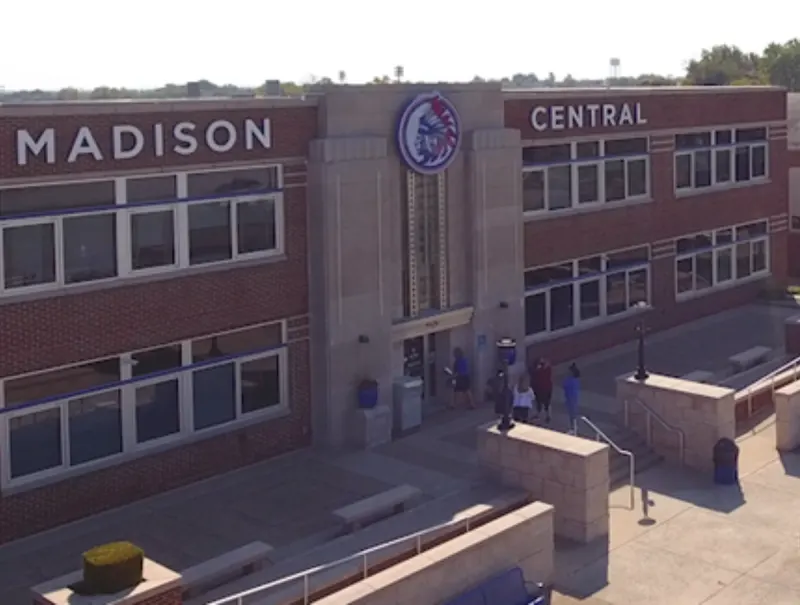
- The Front of Madison Central High School

Location
- 705 North Second Street; Richmond, Kentucky 40475; United States
- Coordinates: 37°45′21″N 84°17′27″W

Information
- Former name: Central High School (1908-1974)
- Type: Public high school
- School district: Madison County School District
- Superintendent: Randy Neeley
- CEEB code: 182278
- Principal: Brandon Fritz
- Teaching staff: 114.36 (on an FTE basis)
- Grades: 9–12
- Gender: Co-educational
- Enrollment: 2,250 (2023–2024)
- Student to teacher ratio: 19.67
- Colors: Red, blue, white
- Mascot: Indians
- Rival: Madison Southern High School
- Website: mchs.madison.kyschools.us

Madison Central High School is a public high school located in Richmond, Kentucky, United States. The school had an enrollment of 2,226 in the 2022–2023 year. Madison Central has a variety of nicknames amongst the student body and overall, The Commonwealth of Kentucky, having their school nicknames being Mad Cent, Mad Central, MadiCentral, "The cousin up North (usually for students attending Madison Southern)" and Central.

== History ==
The original Central High School was built in 1908 and was one of several small high schools in Madison County. Additions were made to the school beginning in 1953 and Madison Central (consolidated) High School was opened in the fall of 1954. Central was a consolidation of four Madison County system high schools (Central, Kingston, Waco and Kirksville). It was the lone high school in the county system until Madison Southern High School was opened in the fall of 1988. In 1989, Richmond's city high school (Madison) was dissolved and its students were moved to Central. Madison Central currently serves the citizens of Richmond and the northern sector of Madison County.

In 2003, the school underwent a major renovation project, which included a new cafeteria. In 2005–2006, an auditorium was built on the school campus, as well as remodeling the hallway section that leads to it and the health building gymnasium, and new sets of classrooms and a lecture hall under the auditorium.

Madison Central won its first basketball state title in 2013.

== Athletic awards ==
Marching Band:

- KMEA State Champion (6)
  - Class 2A - 1989
  - Class 3A - 2004
  - Class 5A - 2014, 2015, 2016, 2022
