= Richmond High School (Richmond, Kentucky) =

African American school in Richmond, Kentucky (1900–1973)

Richmond High and Elementary School
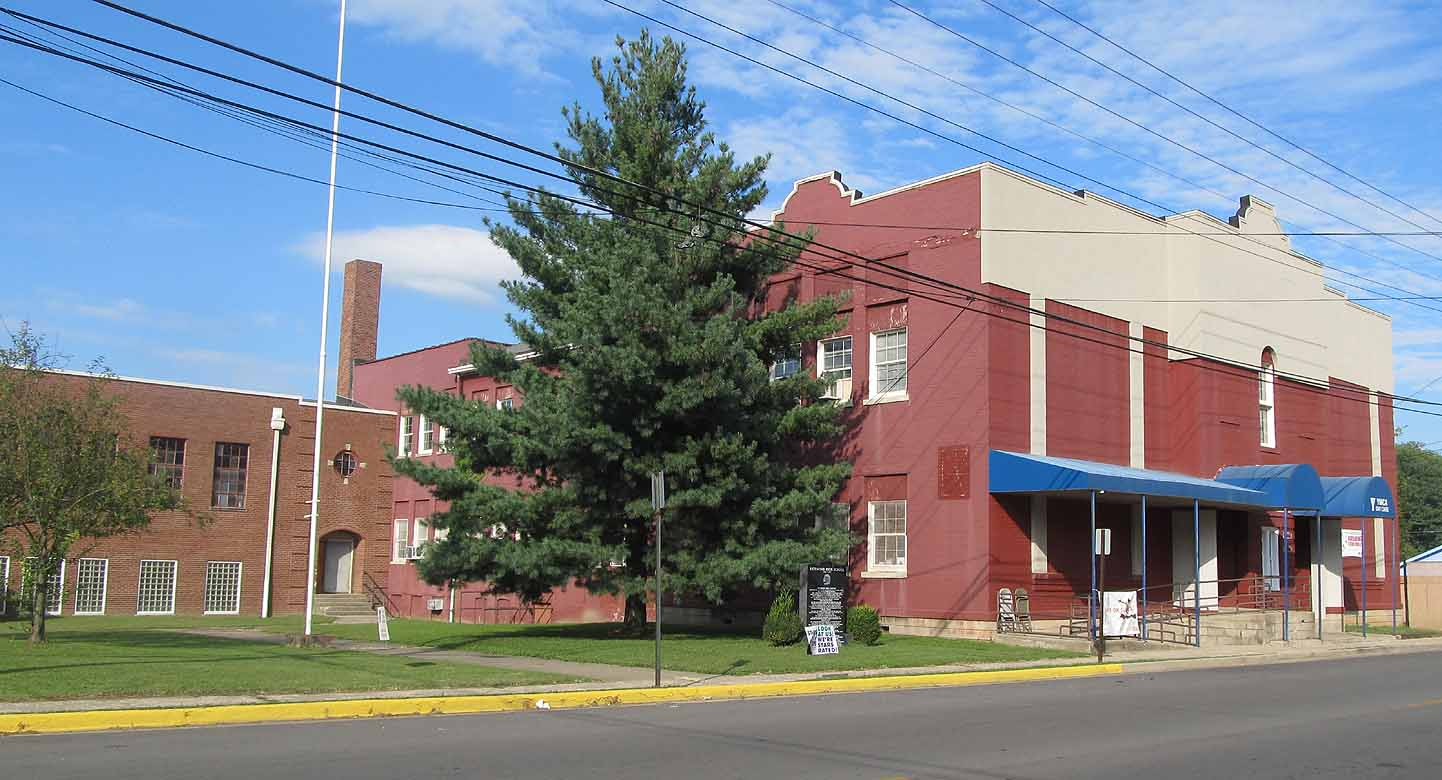

Location
- 1100 East Main Street; Richmond, Kentucky 40475; United States
- 37.7433623°N 84.2825508°W

Information
- Other names: Richmond High and Elementary School; Richmond High and Junior High School
- Former name: Richmond City (Colored) School for African-American Children (1896 to 1900)
- Type: Public
- Established: 1896
- Closed: 1973
- Colors: Blue and White
- Nickname: Ramblers

Richmond High School (1900–1973), was a segregated public high school for African-American students in Richmond, Kentucky (Madison County, Kentucky). The school offered classes for grades 9-12 and enrollment never exceeded 150. It never graduated a class of more than 50 students in its existence. The official name of the school was Richmond High and Elementary School.

In 1956, Richmond High was integrated into the city high school for white students (Madison) as the Richmond City Board of Education carried out the Supreme Court's Brown decision. A gradual integration program was initiated that year as sophomores, juniors and seniors from Richmond High were enrolled at Madison High. By 1960, freshmen were admitted as well. Richmond Junior High and Elementary remained open through the 1972–73 school year.

It was then closed and was soon occupied by Richmond's Telford Community Center, and later the Telford YMCA Community Center.

== History ==
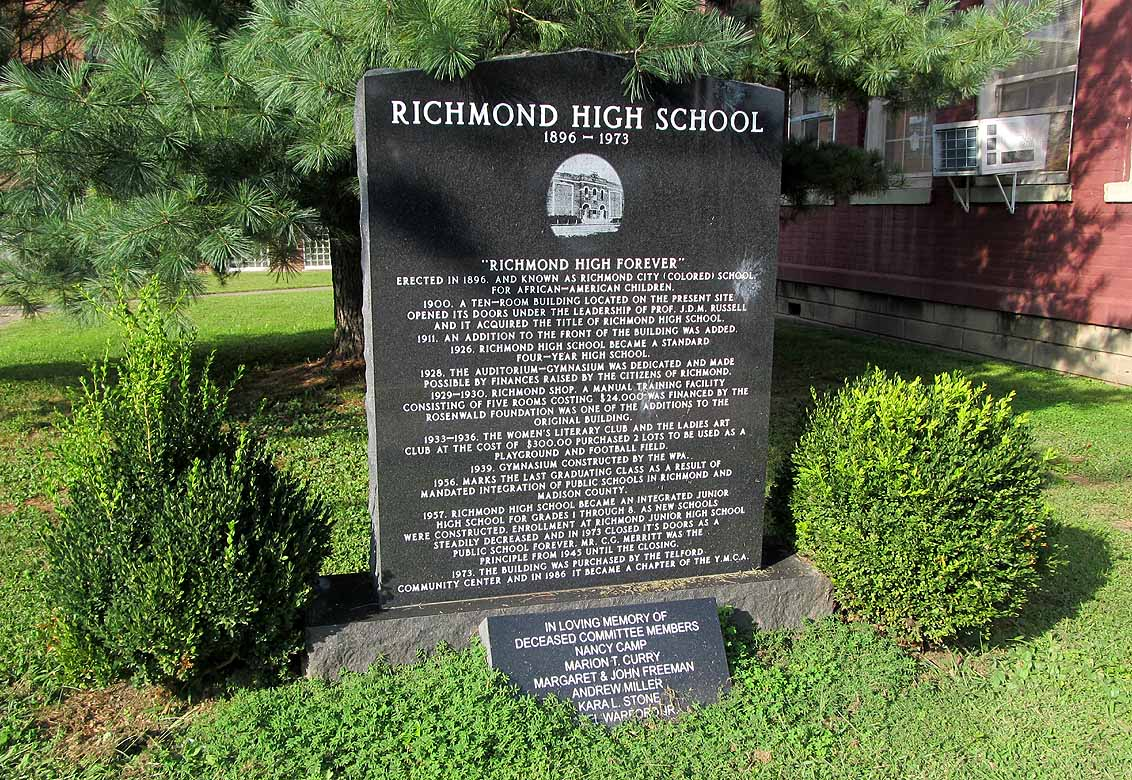
"Richmond High Forever" monument

A monument has been placed in front of the old high school (now the Telford YMCA Community Center) and provides the following condensed history of the school: Richmond High School was originally erected in 1896 and became known as Richmond City (Colored) School for African-American children. In 1900, a ten-room building located on the present site opened its doors under the leadership of Prof. J. D. M. Russell and it acquired the title of Richmond High School. In 1911, an addition to the front of the building was added and by 1926, Richmond became a standard four-year high school. In 1928, the auditorium-gymnasium (made possible by finances raised by the citizens of Richmond) was dedicated. In 1929–30, a manual training facility (consisting of five rooms and costing $24,000) was financed by the Rosenwald Foundation and added to the original building.

In the 1930s, African American students from the rural hamlet of Bobtown were bused to Richmond High School and Middletown Consolidated School.

In 1933–36, the Women's Literary Club and the Ladies Art Club purchased 2 lots (at a cost of $300) to be used as a playground and a football field. In 1939, the gymnasium was constructed by the Work Progress Administration (WPA).

As a result of mandated integration of public schools in Richmond and Madison County in 1955, the 1956 school year marked the last graduating class at Richmond High School, before the school was renamed Richmond Elementary School. In 1957, the building became Richmond Junior High (for grades 1–8). As new schools were constructed, enrollment at Richmond Junior steadily decreased, and in 1973, it closed its doors as a public school forever.

Mr. C. G. Merritt was the principal of Richmond High and Junior High from 1945 to 1973.

== Gymnasium (1939) ==
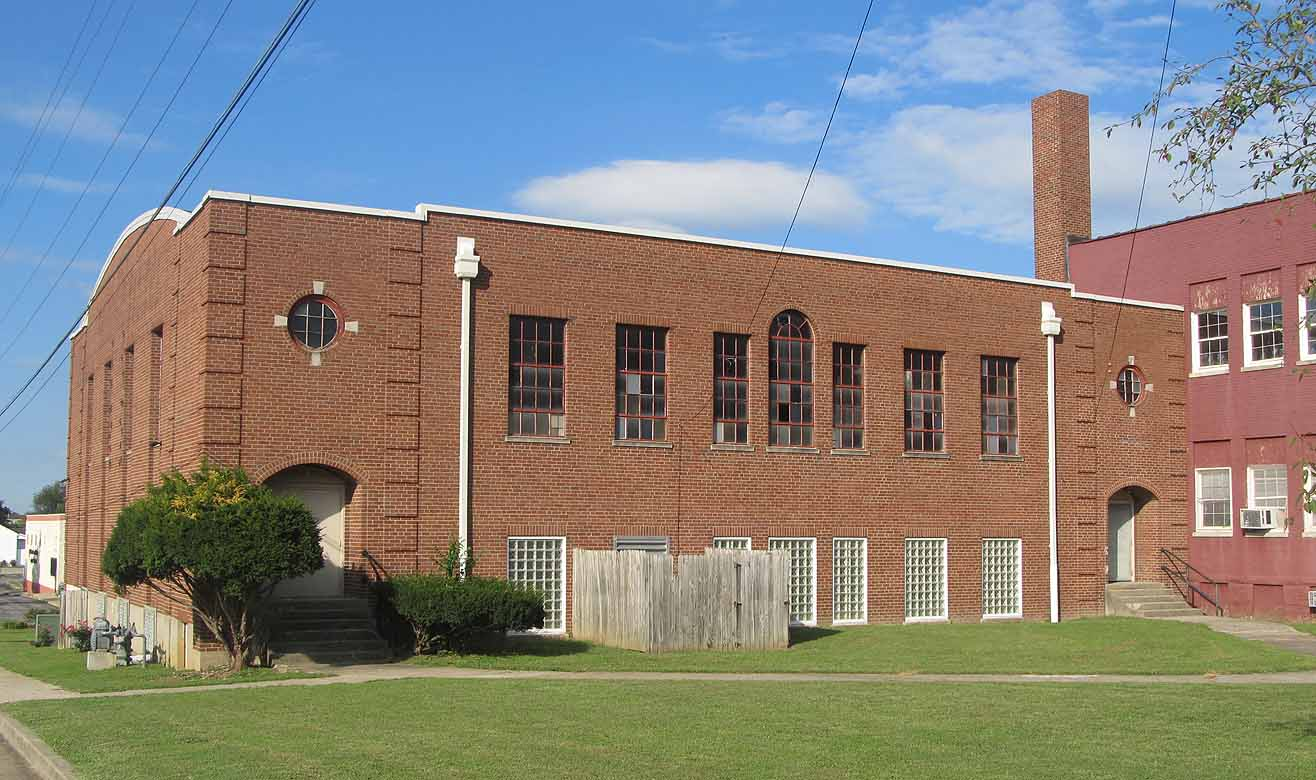
Richmond High Gymnasium erected in 1939 by the WPA

After the construction of a new gymnasium by the Works Progress Administration (WPA) in 1939, Richmond High became one of the KHSAL (Kentucky High School Athletic League) basketball powers. Under Coach Joseph G. Fletcher, the Ramblers won Kentucky state basketball titles in 1940, 1942, and 1943.

== Closure ==
The building was purchased by the Telford Community Center in 1973 and in 1986, it became a chapter of the Young Men's Christian Association (YMCA). On January 31, 2019, the 122-year-old school building was demolished. The gymnasium (added in 1939) was not destroyed. It continues to be used by the YMCA.

== See also ==
- History of African Americans in Kentucky
