= Model Laboratory Schools =

Coordinates: 37.73819°N 84.30413°W

- 521 Lancaster Avenue; Richmond, Kentucky 40475

Information
- Type: Laboratory School
- Established: 1906
- Superintendent: John R. Williamson, Ph.D.
- Principal: Amber Catron (Elementary) Hollli Hunt, Ed.D. (Secondary)
- Grades: P-12
- Enrollment: 725
- Colors: maroon and navy
- Mascot: Patriot
- Information: 859-622-4000
- Website: School website

Model Laboratory Schools is the only remaining laboratory school in the state of Kentucky. It is located on the campus of Eastern Kentucky University, in Richmond, Kentucky, United States.

Model Laboratory Schools is home to around 720 students in grades Pre-K through 12. Enrollment is open to the public, and families of prospective students may submit an application to attend. Model High School was identified as a U.S. News 2019 Best High School and one of seven 5 star schools according to the Kentucky Department of Education which also features a 98% graduation rate with graduating classes racking up millions in college scholarships every year.

== History ==
Model is the first laboratory school established in Kentucky. It opened its doors on September 11, 1906 (four months prior to the opening of Eastern Kentucky State Normal School). It was initially organized as a private school to provide its students with facilities and opportunities of a superior level, as a demonstration school to acquaint college students with the methods of teaching, and as a training school to give prospective teachers practical experience in teaching.

The school was located on the property of Walters Collegiate Institute and was housed in the Central University Building. Col. E. H. Crawford was appointed the first director of the school, but due to his late arrival, J. A. Sharon was made acting principal and actually served as its first administrator. Colonel Crawford served one terms as director, followed by Professor Ira Waite Jayne (1907–09) and E. George Payne (1909–1910). Dr. John Grant Crabbe, then President of the college, assumed the duties of the directorship and held that position until he retired in 1918.

R. A. Edwards served as director of the Training School from 1918 to 1954 and as principal of the high school until he was succeeded in 1935 by Dr. J. Dorland Coates. Dr. Coates served as principal of Model High School from 1935 until 1954, when he succeeded Edwards as director of the entire laboratory school. Dr. Henry Martin was appointed the director of the Elementary Training Center in 1954. With the completion of a new school plan in 1961, "Laboratory" was added to Model's name, and the elementary and high school divisions were combined. Dixon A. Barr was made the director of the new Model Laboratory School.

The school's mascot was formerly the Rebels, but was changed to the Patriots by the student council in 1976 (in contradiction to the student vote for the nickname Raiders).

Plans for the new Model Laboratory School were initiated in 1959 by President William F. O'Donnell and the Eastern Board of Regents. The new building replaced the Cammack Building and the historic University Building which had housed "old Model" since 1906. The current building was named for Dr. H. L. Donovan, President of Eastern from 1928 until 1941, and was occupied in September 1961. The school was integrated in the fall of 1967.

== Athletics ==
Model currently offers a wide variety of athletics including swimming, diving, volleyball, tennis, golf, soccer, baseball, basketball, softball, track, archery, and cross-country. Model also has many clubs and organizations available to its students, including one of the oldest Key Clubs in the country.

As early as 1911, Model was participating in basketball, baseball, and track, and was a participant in the first Kentucky High School Basketball Tournament. The school progressed in modes and methods of public education in spite of many hindrances such as changes in enrollment and the dropping and re-establishment of the high school grades. In 1936, Model High School and the city school, Madison High, combined to enrich their programs and to avoid a duplication of efforts. The schools were accredited jointly by the Southern Association of Secondary Schools as Madison-Model High School. The two divisions retained their respective organizations, but combined such activities as commencement, athletics, and music until the schools were separated in 1961.

== Current ==
Model is the only laboratory school in the state of Kentucky. In the summer of 2019, the school debuted The Center for Educator Excellence, its professional development organization, which hosted the first ever AP Summer Institute with the goal of providing high school teachers the best practices to teach college-level content.

In 2024 Model Laboratory Schools was recognized in the 2024 Advanced Placement Program (AP) School Honor Roll, earning Platinum distinction. The school saw high levels of students taking advanced placement classes and taking the tests. This achievement means great college preparedness for the high school students.

Model is also a member of the Laboratory School Association or NALS: The International Association of Laboratory and University Affiliated Schools.

Model Laboratory Schools has funding for a new school building. Model plans to break ground in early 2025 and have the school to open in fall of 2027.
