= National Register of Historic Places listings in Madison County, Kentucky =

Location of Madison County in Kentucky

This is a list of the National Register of Historic Places listings in Madison County, Kentucky.

This is intended to be a complete list of the properties and districts on the National Register of Historic Places in Madison County, Kentucky, United States. The locations of National Register properties and districts for which the latitude and longitude coordinates are included below, may be seen in a map.

There are 82 properties and districts listed on the National Register in the county; 2 of these are National Historic Landmarks.

This National Park Service list is complete through NPS recent listings posted August 28, 2026.

== Current listings ==
| | Name on the Register | Image | Date listed | Location | City or town | Description |
|---|---|---|---|---|---|---|
| 1 | Archeological Site 15 Ma 24 | Archeological Site 15 Ma 24 | August 18, 1980 (#80001651) | At Round Hill; 37°40′46″N 84°25′00″W | Round Hill | |
| 2 | Archeological Site No. 15MA25 | | April 28, 1983 (#83002816) | Address Restricted | Bighill | |
| 3 | Arlington | Arlington | October 13, 1983 (#83003778) | Lexington Rd. 37°45′40″N 84°19′19″W | Richmond | |
| 4 | Battle of Richmond Historic Areas | Battle of Richmond Historic Areas | August 22, 1996 (#94000844) | Two discontiguous areas: one northeast of the junction of U.S. Routes 25 and 421, and one southeast of the junction of U.S. Route 25 and Rose Ln. 37°40′10″N 84°15′07″W | Richmond | |
| 5 | Berea College Forest | Berea College Forest | November 4, 2003 (#02000343) | Kentucky Route 21, 2 miles (3.2 km) east of the Berea College campus 37°32′00″N 84°13′41″W | Berea | |
| 6 | Berea College Square Commercial Historic District | | December 9, 2020 (#100005899) | Main St. (100 blk.), Short St. (200 blk.), Center St. (100 blk., 204 Center), Jackson St., (103-105) and Prospect St. 37°34′20″N 84°17′17″W | Berea | |
| 7 | Berea Downtown Commercial and Residential Historic District | Berea Downtown Commercial and Residential Historic District | December 10, 2020 (#100005909) | Roughly bounded by Chestnut St. (300-400), North Broadway St. (100-200), Adams St. (200), Parkway Ave. (100), Pasco St. (100), and Bond St. 37°34′05″N 84°17′53″W | Berea | |
| 8 | Blair Park | Blair Park | October 13, 1983 (#83003779) | 108 Rosedale St. 37°45′16″N 84°18′27″W | Richmond | |
| 9 | Blythewood | Blythewood | February 8, 1989 (#88003330) | Junction of Peytontown and Duncanon Rds. 37°40′16″N 84°19′21″W | Richmond | |
| 10 | Bogie Circle | | March 28, 1983 (#83002814) | Address Restricted | Ruthton | |
| 11 | Bogie Houses and Mill Site | | August 13, 1976 (#76000920) | 8 miles (13 km) west of Richmond on Silver Creek; 37°43′42″N 84°25′28″W | Richmond | |
| 12 | Boone Tavern Hotel | Boone Tavern Hotel | January 11, 1996 (#95001527) | 100 Main St. 37°34′19″N 84°17′19″W | Berea | |
| 13 | Judge Daniel Breck House | Judge Daniel Breck House | November 7, 1976 (#76000921) | 312 Lancaster Ave. 37°44′47″N 84°18′00″W | Richmond | |
| 14 | Bronston Place | Bronston Place | October 13, 1983 (#83003781) | Woodland Ave. 37°45′06″N 84°17′41″W | Richmond | |
| 15 | Burnamwood | Burnamwood | January 3, 1984 (#84001801) | Burnam Ct. 37°45′07″N 84°18′21″W | Richmond | |
| 16 | Campbell House | | February 8, 1989 (#88003334) | Kentucky Route 52 near Paint Lick; 37°37′47″N 84°24′10″W | Paint Lick | |
| 17 | Cane Springs Primitive Baptist Church | | December 22, 1978 (#78001381) | North of College Hill; 37°49′37″N 84°07′51″W | College Hill | |
| 18 | Chenault House | | February 8, 1989 (#88003339) | 200 Dr. Robert R. Martin Bypass; 37°46′28″N 84°18′11″W | Richmond | |
| 19 | Churchill Weavers | Churchill Weavers | January 8, 2014 (#13001054) | 100 Churchill Dr. 37°34′42″N 84°16′52″W | Berea | |
| 20 | Brutus and Pattie Field Clay House | Brutus and Pattie Field Clay House | June 13, 1990 (#88003341) | Lexington Rd. west of Richmond; 37°45′55″N 84°18′31″W | Richmond | |
| 21 | Whitney Cobb House | | February 8, 1989 (#88003312) | Kentucky Route 388; 37°50′26″N 84°15′48″W | Richmond | |
| 22 | Cornelison Mound | | February 12, 1998 (#98000090) | Address Restricted | Ruthton | |
| 23 | Cornelison Pottery | Cornelison Pottery | July 24, 1978 (#78001380) | Kentucky Route 52; 37°43′58″N 84°07′29″W | Bybee | |
| 24 | Covington House | | February 8, 1989 (#88003329) | Southwest of Richmond on Kentucky Route 595; 37°41′17″N 84°20′12″W | Richmond | |
| 25 | Coy Site Complex | | February 12, 1998 (#98000091) | Address Restricted | Richmond | |
| 26 | Downtown Richmond Historic District | Downtown Richmond Historic District | September 30, 1976 (#76000922) | Main St. and Courthouse Sq. 37°44′52″N 84°17′43″W | Richmond | Includes the Glyndon Hotel. |
| 27 | Dozier-Guess House | | May 1, 1989 (#88003343) | Kentucky Route 388, Red House Rd. 37°47′02″N 84°16′28″W | Richmond | |
| 28 | Duncannon | | September 17, 1980 (#80001650) | South of Richmond on John Parrish Lane; 37°40′38″N 84°17′46″W | Richmond | |
| 29 | Eastern Kentucky University Historic District | Eastern Kentucky University Historic District | January 3, 1984 (#84001804) | Lancaster, Crabbe Sts. and University Dr. 37°44′30″N 84°18′00″W | Richmond | |
| 30 | Elk Garden | | February 8, 1989 (#88003326) | South of Kirksville off Kentucky Route 595; 37°38′34″N 84°23′48″W | Kirksville | |
| 31 | Elmwood | Elmwood | August 6, 2012 (#84003927) | Lancaster Ave. 37°44′38″N 84°18′11″W | Richmond | |
| 32 | Farmers Bank of Kirksville | Farmers Bank of Kirksville | June 13, 1990 (#88003324) | Near the junction of Kentucky Route 595 and County Road 1295; 37°39′55″N 84°24′31″W | Kirksville | |
| 33 | Fort Boonesborough Townsite Historic District | Fort Boonesborough Townsite Historic District | April 14, 1994 (#94000303) | 4375 Old Boonesborough Rd. 37°53′18″N 84°16′03″W | Richmond | |
| 34 | Griggs House | | February 8, 1989 (#88003316) | North of Waco; 37°44′43″N 84°08′34″W | Waco | |
| 35 | Hagan House | | February 8, 1989 (#88003337) | Hagans Mill Rd. 37°41′29″N 84°21′46″W | Richmond | |
| 36 | Hakins-Stone-Hagan-Curtis House | | February 8, 1989 (#88003327) | 1875 Curtis Pike; 37°41′50″N 84°22′57″W | Kirksville | |
| 37 | Nathan Hawkins House | | June 23, 1983 (#83002815) | Curtis Rd. 37°41′46″N 84°23′08″W | Kirksville | |
| 38 | William Holloway House | William Holloway House | October 13, 1983 (#83003783) | Hillsdale St. 37°44′45″N 84°17′18″W | Richmond | |
| 39 | Homelands | | February 8, 1989 (#88003332) | Northwest of Richmond on U.S. Route 25; 37°49′43″N 84°19′39″W | Richmond | |
| 40 | Irvinton | Irvinton | May 6, 1975 (#75000798) | 319 Lancaster Ave. 37°44′40″N 84°17′58″W | Richmond | |
| 41 | Merritt Jones Tavern | Merritt Jones Tavern | April 2, 1973 (#73000817) | 1 mile (1.6 km) south of Bighill on U.S. Route 421; 37°39′05″N 84°45′32″W | Bighill | |
| 42 | Karr House | | February 8, 1989 (#88003313) | Lost Fork Rd. 37°50′37″N 84°17′17″W | Richmond | |
| 43 | Kellogg and Company Warehouse | | August 2, 2017 (#100001424) | 131 Orchard St. 37°44′43″N 84°17′11″W | Richmond | |
| 44 | Kirksville Christian Church | Kirksville Christian Church | February 8, 1989 (#88003325) | Kentucky Route 595; 37°39′47″N 84°24′27″W | Kirksville | |
| 45 | Lincoln Hall | Lincoln Hall | December 2, 1974 (#74000892) | Berea College campus 37°34′19″N 84°17′26″W | Berea | |
| 46 | Louisville and Nashville Railroad Passenger Depot | Louisville and Nashville Railroad Passenger Depot | August 22, 1975 (#75000797) | Broadway at Adams St. 37°34′17″N 84°17′58″W | Berea | |
| 47 | Madison County Courthouse | Madison County Courthouse | May 12, 1975 (#75000800) | Main St. between N. 1st and N. 2nd Sts. 37°44′51″N 84°16′59″W | Richmond | |
| 48 | Mason House | | February 8, 1989 (#88003320) | South of Richmond off Meneleus Pike; 37°39′25″N 84°18′27″W | Richmond | |
| 49 | William M. Miller Farm | | January 4, 2001 (#00001599) | 1099 Parrish Rd. 37°40′18″N 84°17′35″W | Richmond | |
| 50 | William M. Miller House | | July 16, 1979 (#79003602) | South of Richmond; 37°40′08″N 84°17′45″W | Richmond | |
| 51 | Moberly House | Moberly House | February 8, 1989 (#88003315) | 0.3 miles (0.48 km) north of Old Kentucky Route 52; 37°44′43″N 84°09′58″W | Moberly | |
| 52 | John Moberly House | | June 23, 1983 (#83002817) | Gum Bottom Rd. 37°39′41″N 84°10′40″W | Moberly | |
| 53 | Morrison House | | February 8, 1989 (#88003340) | East of Kirksville off Kentucky Route 595; 37°39′38″N 84°23′16″W | Kirksville | |
| 54 | Mt. Pleasant | Mt. Pleasant | October 13, 1983 (#83003784) | 2nd and Water Sts. 37°44′46″N 84°17′44″W | Richmond | |
| 55 | Mt. Pleasant Christian Church | | February 8, 1989 (#88003331) | North of Richmond on U.S. Route 25; 37°50′16″N 84°19′35″W | Richmond | |
| 56 | Mt. Zion Christian Church | Mt. Zion Christian Church | February 8, 1989 (#88003318) | U.S. Route 421 south of its junction with U.S. Route 25; 37°40′25″N 84°15′14″W | Richmond | |
| 57 | Stephen Murphy House | | June 23, 1983 (#83002818) | Off Kentucky Route 39; 37°45′30″N 84°30′40″W | Little Hickman | |
| 58 | Newby Country Store | | April 14, 2025 (#100011680) | 435 Newby Road; 37°45′43″N 84°24′57″W | Richmond | |
| 59 | Isaac Newland House | | June 23, 1983 (#83002819) | Off U.S. Route 25; 37°47′55″N 84°19′56″W | Richmond | |
| 60 | Noland Mound (15-Ma-14) | | January 27, 1983 (#83002820) | Address Restricted | Richmond | |
| 61 | Old Central University | Old Central University | June 19, 1973 (#73000818) | University Dr. on Eastern Kentucky University campus 37°44′27″N 84°18′04″W | Richmond | |
| 62 | Richmond Armory | Richmond Armory | March 24, 2000 (#00000282) | Junction of 2nd St. and Moberly Ave. 37°45′04″N 84°17′32″W | Richmond | No longer extant. |
| 63 | Richmond Cemetery | Richmond Cemetery | October 13, 1983 (#83003785) | E. Main St. 37°44′32″N 84°17′23″W | Richmond | |
| 64 | Robbins Mound | | February 12, 1998 (#98000092) | Address Restricted | Ruthton | |
| 65 | Rolling Meadows | | February 8, 1989 (#88003321) | Kentucky Route 595 north of Round Hill; 37°41′27″N 84°25′29″W | Round Hill | |
| 66 | Shearer Store | | June 13, 1990 (#88003314) | Kentucky Route 1936 at Union City; 37°47′52″N 84°11′51″W | Richmond | |
| 67 | Simmons House | | February 8, 1989 (#88003323) | Arbuckle Lane off County Road 1295; 37°41′14″N 84°23′13″W | Richmond | |
| 68 | Stephenson House | | February 8, 1989 (#88003322) | North of Round Hill on Kentucky Route 595; 37°40′57″N 84°25′05″W | Round Hill | |
| 69 | Tate Building | Tate Building | September 13, 2006 (#06000814) | 444 Chestnut St. 37°34′05″N 84°17′55″W | Berea | |
| 70 | Tates Creek Baptist Church | | February 8, 1989 (#88003333) | Kentucky Route 627/Boonesborough Rd. 37°50′49″N 84°19′06″W | Richmond | |
| 71 | Taylor House | | February 8, 1989 (#88003336) | North of Baldwin; 37°48′24″N 84°25′49″W | Baldwin | |
| 72 | Taylor House | Taylor House | October 13, 1983 (#83003787) | 216 Water St. 37°44′49″N 84°17′47″W | Richmond | |
| 73 | Tevis House | | February 8, 1989 (#88003335) | Kentucky Route 627/Boonesborough Rd. 37°51′24″N 84°17′32″W | Richmond | |
| 74 | Turner House | | February 8, 1989 (#88003338) | Southeast of Richmond on Curtis Pike; 37°42′01″N 84°22′24″W | Richmond | |
| 75 | Turner-Fitzpatrick House | | February 8, 1989 (#88003328) | Off Mule Shed Rd. 37°44′26″N 84°21′46″W | Richmond | |
| 76 | Squire Turner House | Squire Turner House | October 13, 1983 (#83003786) | 302 N. 2nd St. 37°44′46″N 84°17′44″W | Richmond | |
| 77 | Union Bus Station | Union Bus Station | April 10, 2007 (#07000285) | 127 S. 3rd St. 37°44′58″N 84°17′49″W | Richmond | |
| 78 | Viney Fork Baptist Church | | February 8, 1989 (#88003317) | Junction of County Roads 374 and 499; 37°40′26″N 84°10′38″W | Speedwell | |
| 79 | Walker House | Walker House | October 13, 1983 (#83003789) | 315 Lancaster Ave. 37°44′45″N 84°17′57″W | Richmond | |
| 80 | William Walker House | | February 8, 1989 (#88003319) | Duncannon Rd. 37°40′44″N 84°18′27″W | Richmond | |
| 81 | West Richmond Historic District | West Richmond Historic District | January 12, 1984 (#84001815) | Roughly W. Main St. between Church and Norwood Sts. 37°44′59″N 84°18′00″W | Richmond | |
| 82 | Whitehall | Whitehall | March 11, 1971 (#71000352) | 7 miles (11 km) north of Richmond on Clay Lane off U.S. Route 25; 37°49′58″N 84°21′08″W | Richmond | |

== See also ==
- List of National Historic Landmarks in Kentucky
- National Register of Historic Places listings in Kentucky
