= Boone's Station (disambiguation) =

Boone's Station may refer to a number of sites related to American frontiersman Daniel Boone (1734–1820):

- Boonesborough, Madison County, Kentucky, originally known as "Boone's Station" (1775)
  - Fort Boonesborough State Park, the recreated stockade nearby
- Boone Station, Fayette County, Kentucky, known as "New Boone Station" (1776), established by Daniel's son Israel
  - Boone Station State Historic Site, a Kentucky State Historic Site there
- Squire Boone's Station, Shelby County, Kentucky (1779), established by Daniel's brother Squire
- Booneville, Owsley County, Kentucky, named in Boone's honor although he did not found it

NB: Today, the Fayette County site is the most commonly referred to by this name.
