= Bybee =

Bybee may refer to:

== Places ==
United States

- Bybee, Illinois
- Bybee, Kentucky
- Bybee, Tennessee
- Bybee, Virginia

== Other uses ==
- Bybee (surname)
- Bybee Bridge
- Smith and Bybee Wetlands Natural Area
- Bybee–Howell House
- Bybee Pottery
