= Bibey (surname) =

Bibey is a surname. Notable people with the surname include:

- Alan Bibey (born 1964), American mandolinist, singer-songwriter, and band leader
- Ricky Bibey (born 1981), British rugby league footballer

== See also ==
- Bybee (surname)
