= Tates Creek Baptist Church =

Historic church in Kentucky, United States

- U.S. National Register of Historic Places
- Location within Kentucky Location within the United States
- Nearest city: Richmond, Kentucky
- Coordinates: 37°50′49″N 84°19′6″W
- Area: 2.1 acres (0.85 ha)
- Built: 1851
- Architectural style: Greek Revival
- MPS: Madison County MRA
- NRHP reference No.: 88003333
- Added to NRHP: February 8, 1989

The Tates Creek Baptist Church is a Baptist church organized in 1783. In May 1775 the first recorded religious service took place in Fort Boonesborough. It met in a stone building around Shallow Ford until it burned down around 1850. The current building was finished in 1851. Several members of the congregation were delegates to a convention held in September 1786 regarding separating Kentucky from Virginia. Tates Creek Baptist Church is listed on the National Register of Historic Places. It is affiliated with the Southern Baptist Convention.

== Rev. Andrew Tribble ==
The founding pastor of the Tates Creek Baptist Church, Andrew Tribble, was a friend of Thomas Jefferson and may have helped shape his political philosophy.

According to church historian Ms. Edith Ratliff, Tribble came to Madison County from Virginia and helped found the church between 1783 and 1785, and organized the church in 1786. Tribble was Tates Creek Baptist's pastor until 1819. He died in 1821 and is buried off Colonel Road, south of the church.

A monument to Tribble, placed by the North Carolina–based Baptist Church Preservation Society, highlights the persecution of Tribble and other Baptists suffered in colonial Virginia, when only members of the Anglican clergy were allowed to preach.

In addition to erecting the monument, the preservation society also did restorative work on the stone wall that surrounds Tribble's grave site, said local historian James Neale, a descendant of Tribble.

== Influence on founding fathers ==
It has been claimed in print from the nineteenth century onward that Thomas Jefferson's ideas of democracy were influenced by Baptist congregations, and in particular by Andrew Tribble. Calvin Coolidge also alluded to this claim in a 1926 speech. The earliest known source is an anonymous article published in the Christian Watchman ten days after Jefferson's death in 1826, but no first-hand evidence of communications between Tribble and Jefferson has been found.

The Baptists' petitions against their persecution are said to have gained a receptive hearing from such founding fathers as George Washington, Patrick Henry and Thomas Jefferson, and played a role in the statute of religious freedom drafted by Jefferson and adopted by Virginia after the colonies gained independence.

While in Virginia, Tribble pastored a church near Thomas Jefferson's estate, Monticello. Records indicate that Jefferson sometimes attended the church's services and at least once a business session. About ten years before the Revolution, the future president invited Tribble home for Sunday dinner, after which the preacher asked Jefferson what he thought of the denomination's democratic form of government.

All church members, including men, women and children, had equal votes.

Jefferson, who later drafted the Declaration of Independence, is said to have remarked it was "the only form of pure democracy that then existed in the world" and "it would be the best plan of government for the American colonies."

According to stories handed down over the years, Tribble often made mention of Jefferson in his sermons, Ms. Edith Ratliff said.

== See also ==
- Fort Boonesborough State Park
- National Register of Historic Places listings in Madison County, Kentucky
