= Kentucky Route 388 =

State highway in Kentucky

Kentucky Route 388

Route information
- Maintained by KYTC
- Length: 12.937 mi (20.820 km)

Major junctions
- South end: US 25 Bus. / KY 52 / South Second Street in Richmond
- North end: KY 627 at Boonesborough

Location
- Country: United States
- State: Kentucky
- Counties: Madison

Highway system
- Kentucky State Highway System; Interstate; US; State; Parkways
← KY 387	→ KY 389

Kentucky Route 388 (KY 388) is a 12.937-mile (20.820 km) state highway in Madison County, Kentucky, that runs from U.S. Route 25 Business, Kentucky Route 52, and South Second Street in downtown Richmond to Kentucky Route 627 just to the west of Boonesborough. The route passes through Fort Boonesborough State Park, and also comes within 0.5 miles (0.80 km) of Clark County.

== Major intersections ==
The entire route is in Madison County.

Location	mi	km	Destinations	Notes
Richmond	0.000	0.000	US 25 Bus. / KY 52 (West Main Street) / South Second Street	Southern terminus; continues as South Second Street beyond US 25 Bus. / KY 52
	1.967	3.166	KY 1986 (Union City Road) – Union City, Doylesville	
Redhouse	6.259	10.073	KY 3377 west (Lost Fork Road)	Eastern terminus of KY 3377
Boonesborough	12.937	20.820	KY 627 (Boonesborough Road)	Northern terminus
1.000 mi = 1.609 km; 1.000 km = 0.621 mi
