= Kentucky Route 499 =

State highway in Kentucky, United States

Kentucky Route 499
- KY 499 highlighted in red

Route information
- Maintained by KYTC
- Length: 21.190 mi (34.102 km)

Major junctions
- West end: US 25 near Richmond
- US 421 near Richmond; KY 52 near Irvine
- East end: KY 89 near Irvine

Location
- Country: United States
- State: Kentucky
- Counties: Madison, Estill

Highway system
- Kentucky State Highway System; Interstate; US; State; Parkways
← KY 498	→ KY 500

Kentucky Route 499 (KY 499) is a 21.190-mile-long (34.102 km) state highway in Estill and Madison County, Kentucky that runs from U.S. Route 25 south of Richmond to Kentucky Route 89 northwest of Irvine via Speedwell and Witt.

== Major intersections ==
County	Location	mi	km	Destinations	Notes
Madison		0.000	0.000	US 25 (Berea Road)	Western terminus
Madison		1.449	2.332	US 421 south (Battlefield Memorial Highway)	West end of US 421 overlap
Madison		1.483	2.387	US 421 north (Battlefield Memorial Highway)	East end of US 421 overlap
Madison	Speedwell	6.413	10.321	KY 374 north (Speedwell Road)	Southern terminus of KY 374
Estill		16.152	25.994	KY 594 west (Pea Ridge Road)	West end of KY 594 overlap
Estill		16.201	26.073	KY 594 east (Maupin Hill Road)	East end of KY 594 overlap
Estill		17.042	27.426	KY 3328 south (Red Lick Road)	Northern terminus of KY 3328
Estill		18.767	30.203	KY 52 east (Richmond Road) / Shady Lane	West end of KY 52 overlap
Estill		18.827	30.299	KY 3326 west (Cedar Grove Road)	Eastern terminus of KY 3326
Estill		19.593	31.532	KY 3327 south (Stacy Lane Road) / North Stacy Lane Road	Northern terminus of KY 3327
Estill		19.716	31.730	KY 52 west (Richmond Road)	East end of KY 52 overlap
Estill		21.190	34.102	KY 89 (Winchester Road)	Eastern terminus
1.000 mi = 1.609 km; 1.000 km = 0.621 mi: Concurrency terminus
