= Battle of Richmond =

1862 battle of the American Civil War

- Part of the American Civil War
Date	August 29–30, 1862
Location	Madison County, Kentucky 37.6848°N 84.2594°W
Result	Confederate victory

Belligerents
Confederate States	United States (Union)

Commanders and leaders
(Confederate States of America) E. Kirby Smith	(United States) William Nelson (WIA)

Units involved
Army of Kentucky	Army of Kentucky

Strength
6,850 (Note: Values of Confederate strength given by various sources are: 6,850 engaged by Livermore (1900) (p. 89), and 8,000 by Bodart (1908) (p. 526).)	6,500 (Note: Values of Union strength given by various sources are: 6,500 engaged by Livermore (1900) (p. 89).)

Casualties and losses
451 total (78 killed 372 wounded 1 missing)	5,353 total (206 killed 844 wounded 4,303 captured/missing)
- Location within Kentucky

The Battle of Richmond, fought August 29–30, 1862, was one of the most complete Confederate victories in the American Civil War. It was fought by Major General E. Kirby Smith against Union major general William Nelson's forces, which were defending the town. It was the first major battle in the Kentucky Campaign. The battle took place on and around what is now the grounds of the Blue Grass Army Depot, outside Richmond, Kentucky.

== Background ==
In the summer of 1862, two Confederate armies moved on separate paths into Kentucky, hoping to put back into power the shadow government of Kentucky which had lost control over most of the state in early 1862, threaten Union cities along the Ohio River, and recruit men to join the Confederate Army. First to move was Smith, leading the Confederate Army of Kentucky, whose ideas provided the initiative for the offensive. General Braxton Bragg, commanding the Army of Mississippi, moved on a roughly parallel track to the west. Smith departed Knoxville on August 13, and Bragg left Chattanooga on August 27.

== Battle ==
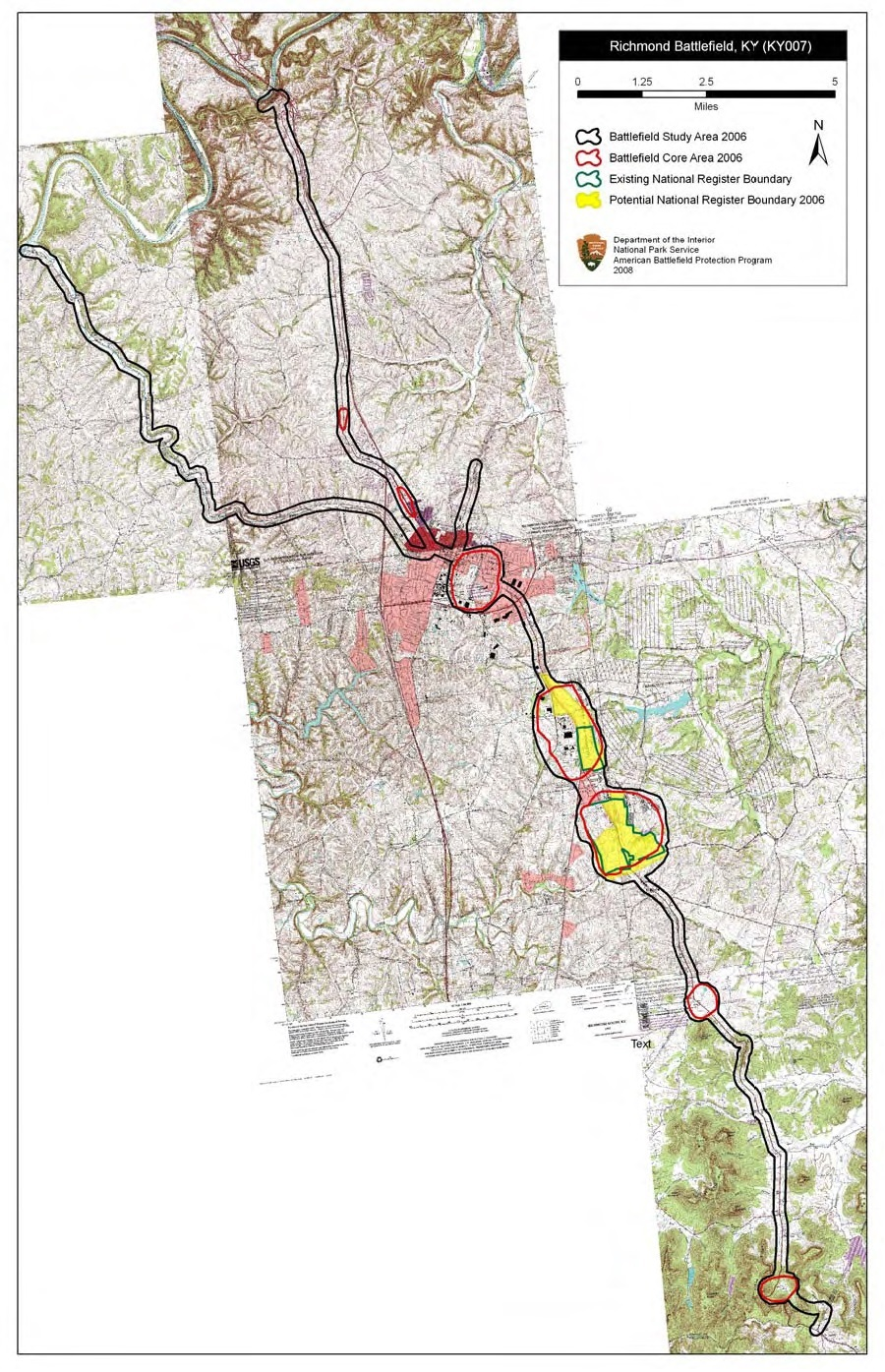
Map of the battlefield core and study areas by the American Battlefield Protection Program

Brigadier General Patrick Cleburne led Smith's advance, with Colonel John S. Scott's cavalry out in front. The Confederate cavalry, while moving north from Big Hill on the road to Richmond, Kentucky on August 29, encountered Union troopers and began skirmishing. After noon, Union artillery and infantry joined the fray, forcing the Confederate cavalry to retreat to Big Hill.

At that time, Brigadier General Mahlon D. Manson, who commanded Union forces in the area, commanded a brigade to march to Rogersville, Kentucky towards the rebels. Fighting for the day stopped after pursuing Union forces briefly skirmished with Cleburne's men in the late afternoon. That night, Manson informed his superior, William Nelson, of his situation, and he ordered another brigade to be ready to march in support when required. Manson arrayed his four regiments to the south of Mt Zion church and had them prepare for an attack.

Smith ordered Cleburne to attack in the morning and promised to hurry reinforcements (Brigadier General Thomas J. Churchill's division). Cleburne started early, marching north, passed through Kingston, dispersed Union skirmishers, and approached Manson's battle line near Zion Church. As the day progressed, additional troops joined both sides. Following an artillery duel, the battle began, and Mason reinforced the Union left flank which he thought was weakening. But Churchill's troops used a hidden ravine to come up on his right, and after a concerted Confederate attack on the Union right, the Union troops gave way. Retreating into Rogersville, they made another futile stand at their old bivouac.

By now, Smith and Nelson had arrived and taken command of their respective armies. Nelson rallied some troops in the cemetery outside Richmond, but they were routed.

== Aftermath ==
Nelson and some of his men escaped, but the Confederates captured over 4,300 Union troops. Total casualties were 5,353 (206 killed, 844 wounded, and 4,303 captured or missing) on the Union side, and 451 (78 killed, 372 wounded, and one missing) for the Confederates. The way north towards Lexington and Frankfort was open.

Civil War historian Shelby Foote remarked that Smith "accomplished in Kentucky the nearest thing to a Cannae ever scored by any general, North or South, in the course of the whole war."

== Battlefield preservation ==
- Battle of Richmond Historic Areas
- U.S. National Register of Historic Places
- U.S. Historic district
- Location within Kentucky Location within the United States
- Nearest city: Richmond, Kentucky
- Area: 214 acres (87 ha)
- NRHP reference No.: 94000844
- Added to NRHP: August 22, 1996

The American Battlefield Trust and its partners have acquired and preserved 365 acres of the Richmond Battlefield as of mid-2023.

The Mt. Zion Christian Church, which served as a hospital during the battle and has cannonballs embedded in its brick walls, is listed on the National Register of Historic Places.

Two discontinuous areas totalling 214 acres (87 ha) were listed on the National Register of Historic Places as Battle of Richmond Historic Areas in 1996. These included four contributing buildings.

== See also ==
- List of battles fought in Kentucky
