= Waco, Kentucky =

Unincorporated community in Kentucky, United States

- Unincorporated community
- Location within Kentucky Location within the United States
- Coordinates: 37°44′33″N 84°08′39″W
- Country: United States
- State: Kentucky
- County: Madison
- Elevation: 824 ft (251 m)
- Time zone: UTC-5 (Eastern (EST))
  - Summer (DST): UTC-4 (EDT)
- ZIP code: 40385
- Area code: 859
- GNIS feature ID: 506078

Waco is an unincorporated community located in Madison County, Kentucky, United States. There are less than 3,000 living arrangements. The community is part of the Richmond–Berea Micropolitan Statistical Area. It is located at the junction of Kentucky Route 52 and Kentucky Route 977, and is located between Madison and Estill County. Waco consists of small towns and roads including the most well-known Elliston, College Hill, and Bybee. The Kentucky River runs through College Hill Road with a boat accessible ramp.

== History ==
A post office called Waco has been in operation since 1861. The community was named after Waco, Texas by Phil A. Huffman and Thomas Thorp Jr. Waco was most known for Serial killer Glen Edward Rogers who was arrested in Waco after a high speed chase on November 13, 1995.

Waco used to be called Viney Fork in 1837, but was then changed to Ogg's Mill by John Martin in 1846, then changed to Elliston by Thomas C. Ellis in 1850.

== Pottery ==
Bybee and Waco built their towns from pottery and manufacturing in mid-nineteenth century. It was named Bybee town in 1859 and its post office closed in 1977 and merged with Waco's postal. Bybee Pottery is registered under the U.S. National Register of Historic Places. It was a pottery company established in 1809 by Webster Cornelison, and the family generations have continued to make and sell pottery until 2011. Bybee Pottery was considered the oldest pottery shop operating in West Appalachia. As of 2019, the family still sells pottery in a new shop in Middletown, Kentucky. College Hill, a road in Waco, was the site of a Texas Seminary which is supposedly what the town was named after. Waco area has a significant amount of white and gray clay deposits, explaining why pottery became a popular trade for the area. Waco was a home to many traditional potters including the Cornelison Family of Bybee 1845, The Grinsteads in 1837, Valentine Baumstark who was from Germany in 1850, Baumstark's nephew, Dennis Zittle in 1854. The ceramic history shows when potters began shifting from salt-glazed stoneware to colorful glazes.

== Local community ==
Waco also shares with the city of Richmond, Eastern Kentucky University's (EKU) Meadowbrook farm. Meadowbrook is a 720-acre farm used for hands on learning for the agriculture department at EKU. The property contains barns, cattle, numerous crops, and is considered a self-sustaining farm.

== Schools ==
Waco holds one of the eleven elementary schools in all the Madison County area. Waco Elementary School is a PK-5 public school and has a total enrollment of 428 students. In 1912, Waco School serviced all grade levels and was built as a two-story brick building. It merged with Kingston and Kirksville High in 1955. In the 90s, Waco elementary made the shift to elementary education only, while the older grades moved to Clark Moores Middle School and Madison Central High School.

Waco Elementary holds 31 full-time teachers and has a total enrollment of 428 students. Waco Elementary holds 31 full-time teachers and is ranked #402 in Kentucky Elementary schools and #8 out of the 10 Madison County Elementary schools. 40% of students score at or above the proficient level for math and 50% scored at/above proficient level for reading. The school enrolls 57% of economically disadvantaged students.
