= Andrew Tribble =

African-American comedian

Andrew Tribble (1879–1935) was an American actor, comedian and female impersonator of the early 20th century who played a variety of female characters at Chicago's Pekin Theatre, on Broadway and in touring companies throughout the United States. He is best known for his characters Lily White, a washerwoman, and Ophelia Snow, from Cole and Johnson's production The Red Moon. He has been described as "a real genius" and "one of the greatest female impersonators".

== Early life ==
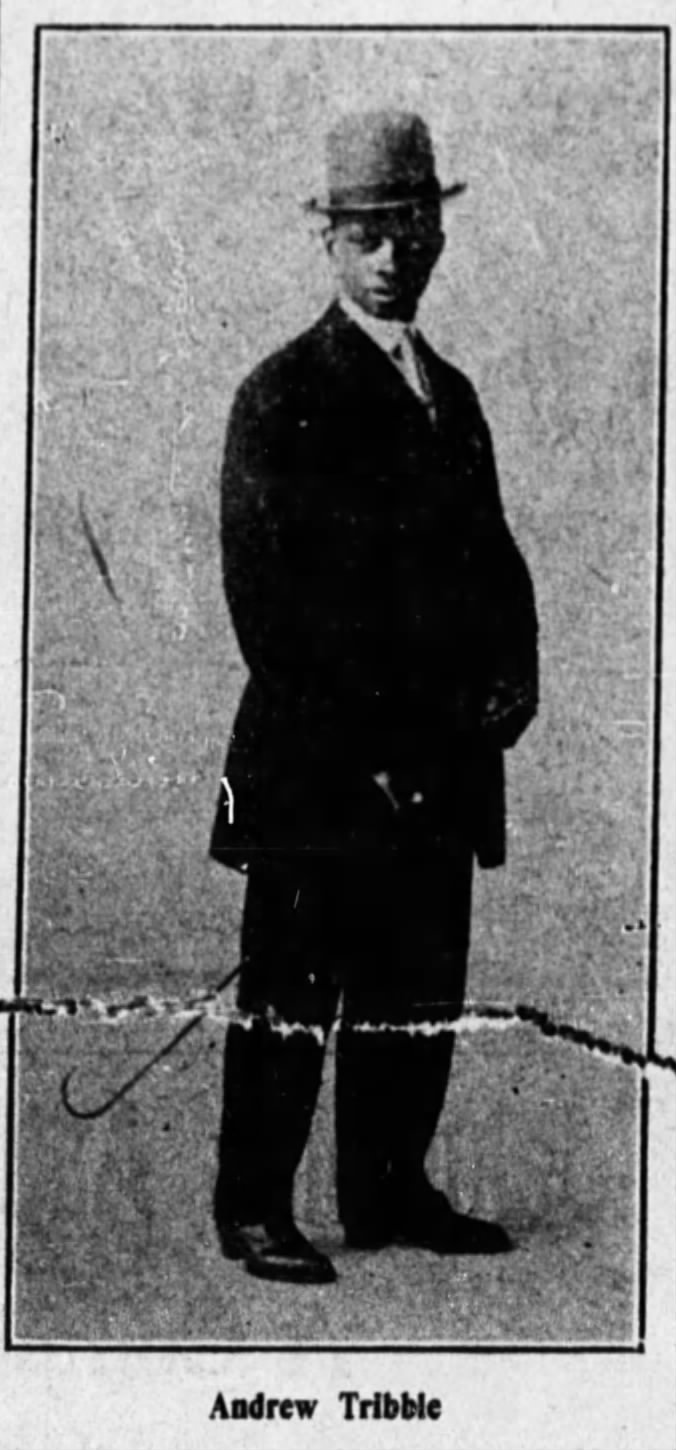
Photo of Vaudeville comedian Andrew Tribble New York Age 1908

Andrew Tribble was born in Union City, Kentucky (Madison County, Kentucky) in 1879. He had one brother, Amos. His father, also named Andrew Tribble, was the grandson of a white preacher with the same name. In 1880, census records show he was boarding with his brother and his mother Alice with a family in Union City.

The Tribble family moved to Richmond, Kentucky in 1882 where he attended school. He started in show business as a young child, in a musical group of black children that was then called a 'pickaninny band', in the minstrel show "Old Kentucky". When he got too old to be in the band, he quit show business for a while.

He married Bessie Asbury, in Marion, Indiana on October 11, 1899.

During his time away from show business, he tried being a jockey, but was scared off from the profession when he got thrown from a horse.

== Career ==
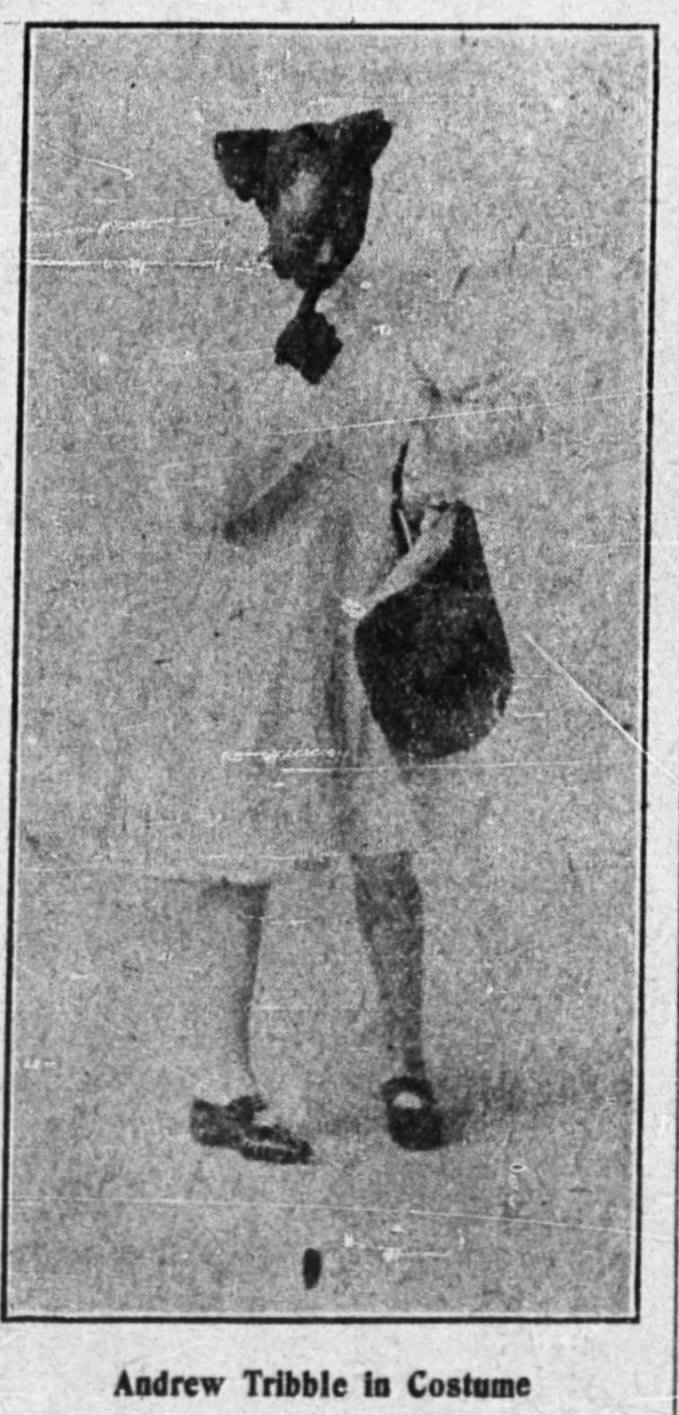
Andrew Tribble playing one of his female characters, 1908

In 1904, Tribble began performing a comedy act with his brother Amos in a theater on State Street in Chicago. His brother quit the business and Andrew eventually moved to the city's well known and black-owned Pekin Theatre, where he initially performed with his wife Bessie.

One night he appeared in a dress to enthusiastic audience response, and from then on he started incorporating drag shows into his performance. The Vaudeville performers and producers Robert Cole and J. Rosamond Johnson saw his show and invited him to join their musical production as Ophelia in the show "Shoo-Fly Regiment".

Tribble, sometimes referred to as "Andy", went on to perform a variety of female characters, One of his most popular was Lilly White, a washerwoman, in Johnson and Cole's "Red Moon" (1908–1910). In this show, he sang the song, "I Ain't Had No Lovin In a Long Time" to delighted audiences. Interviewed after a performance as Ophelia in 1909, Tribble said, "It's a fine thing to have a chance to work up in the world, as I feel I am doing now. It seems that a fellow is happiest when he is busy trying to reach the top round."

In 1911, he was featured as "The Colored Etinge" at New York's Majestic Theater on Broadway in S.H. Dudley's "The Smart Set", along with Aida Overton Walker in "His Honor the Barber." This production billed itself as 'the only colored company in New York City' and advertised that "colored patrons" would be admitted to all parts of the theater. With the Smart Set, a travelling comedy show, Tribble received good reviews as "the irrepressible Babe Johnson", Dudley's performing partner. One reviewer noted that Tribble was careful to always appear in the latest fashion, which at that time was a hobble skirt.

In the 1920s, Tribble continued to play on Broadway and in touring companies throughout the country. In 1928, he created his own successful comedy revue, "Ophelia Snow from Baltimo", which also featured blues singer Clara Smith. Tribble's character Ophelia was described as "a single-minded woman, careless, kindly, tough and above all desirous for an affair of the heart just the same as her sisters blessed with more beauty." Tribble also appeared in other productions, including a 1924 performance of Eubie Blake's Shuffle Along.

Reviewers described Tribble as 'screamingly funny' and "the greatest protean artist his race has ever produced." Fellow female impersonator Julian Etinge called him 'a real genius' and complimented him on 'the studiousness of his dress.' He was also noted for his skills in costume design for fellow actors.

Tribble's successful acting career continued into the early 1930s. In 1930, he played George Brown in the musical comedy the Brown Buddies, which featured Bill "Bojangles" Robinson. In 1931, he appeared at the black-owned Lafayette Theater in Harlem in two comedy reviews: one called "Candyland", which also featured Maud Russell, Tim Moore and Florence Hill, and another called "Pep and Ginger." That same year, Tribble acted in the 1931 film, "The Darktown Revue", directed by African American filmmaker Oscar Micheaux. In 1932, he continued at the Lafayette Theater in the comedy revue "Magnolia Time." In 1934, he was cast as "Flatfoot Mobly" in the three-act comedic play "Brain Sweat" by John C. Brownelle at the Longacre Theater on Broadway, which received positive reviews. Also in 1934, he appeared at the Apollo Theater accompanying jazz great Fletcher Henderson in a radio skit with Eddie Hunter and Speedy Smith. The reviewer noted that the comedy skit received a rare burst of spontaneous applause from the audience.

== Death and legacy ==
Tribble fell ill while performing onstage in 1935. He died at his home in Baltimore, Maryland on October 15, 1935 He was survived by his wife Bessie, a son, Atwood, and four siblings.

The early comedy duo he started with his brother Amos is said to have formed the basis for The Amos and Andy radio comedy show.

In 1953, Ida Forsyne listed Tribble in a column for the New York Age as one of the 'spotlight immortals' she remembered performing with early in her career.

In 2019, a memorial marker for Tribble was placed during a tribute celebration in Tribble's hometown, in Union City Park. In an interview with radio station WEKU, Kentucky resident Rusty Reichenbach, who worked to get the marker placed, praised Tribble's ability to make people laugh and his work laying the groundwork for 21st century American comedians.

== See also ==
- African-American musical theater
- Black Vaudeville
- List of drag queens
