= Redhouse, Kentucky =

Unincorporated community in Kentucky, United States

- Unincorporated community
- Location within Kentucky Location within the United States
- Coordinates: 37°49′56″N 84°16′19″W
- Country: United States
- State: Kentucky
- County: Madison
- Elevation: 719 ft (219 m)
- Time zone: UTC-5 (Eastern (EST))
  - Summer (DST): UTC-4 (EDT)
- ZIP code: 40475
- Area code: 859
- GNIS feature ID: 508915

Redhouse is an unincorporated community in Madison County, Kentucky, in the United States. It is located at the junction of Kentucky Route 388 and Kentucky Route 3377.

Redhouse was settled in the 1840s. The origin of the name is debated, as it could have been named after the nearby Red House Tavern, or a large red brick house. A post office for the town opened in 1883, and closed in 1954.

== Geography ==
Redhouse is located 4 miles north of Richmond, the county seat.
