= Kentucky Route 1958 =

State highway in Kentucky, United States

Kentucky Route 1958
- Bypass Road, Veterans Memorial Parkway
- KY 1958 highlighted in red

Route information
- Maintained by KYTC
- Length: 5.325 mi (8.570 km)

Western segment
- Length: 2.953 mi (4.752 km)
- South end: KY 627 / Hubbard Road in Winchester
- Major intersections: US 60 in Winchester; I-64 in Winchester
- North end: KY 2888 / Revilo Road / Rolling Hills Lane near Winchester

Eastern segment
- Length: 2.372 mi (3.817 km)
- South end: KY 89 near Winchester
- Major intersections: US 60 in Winchester
- North end: KY 627 / Old Paris Pike in Winchester

Location
- Country: United States
- State: Kentucky
- Counties: Clark

Highway system
- Kentucky State Highway System; Interstate; US; State; Parkways
← KY 1957	→ KY 1959

Kentucky Route 1958 (KY 1958) is a 5.325-mile-long (8.570 km) state highway in Clark County, Kentucky, that serves as a bypass route around Winchester. It is split into two segments, one on the west side of Winchester and the second on the east side. The western segment, which is 2.953-mile-long (4.752 km), runs from Kentucky Route 627 in southwestern Winchester to Kentucky Route 2888, Revilo Road, and Rolling Hills Lane northwest of Winchester. The eastern segment, which is 2.372-mile-long (3.817 km), runs from Kentucky Route 89 east of Winchester to Kentucky Route 627 in northern Winchester.

== Route description ==
From KY 627, the eastern segment of KY 1958 heads clockwise around Winchester to Kentucky Route 89. The western segment, KY 1958 starts at KY 627 and follows the highway clockwise around the perimeter of the city to KY 2888 a short distance from the I-64 interchange.

Officially, KY 1958 begins on the east side of Winchester at KY 627 and runs clockwise around to KY 2888 on the northwest side, using concurrences on KY 89, US 60, and KY 627 to connect the eastern and western segments. However, the concurrences are unsigned and the eastern segment's signed cardinal directions are opposite of those on the official log.

== History ==
The western bypass was originally a connector route between I-64, Van Meter Road, Rockwell Road and US 60, but was extended south and southeast to KY 627 south of the city and, later, to its present terminus north of Winchester.

In 2006, the eastern Winchester bypass opened from KY 627 just south of Interstate 64 to KY 89. It will be extended westward to the western bypass, making for a semi-loop around the city.

== Major intersections ==
=== Western segment ===
The entire route is in Clark County.

Location	mi	km	Destinations	Notes
Winchester	0.000	0.000	KY 627 (Boonesboro Road / Boone Avenue) / Hubbard Road	Southern terminus; south end of KY 627 Truck overlap; continues as Hubbard Road beyond KY 627
Winchester	0.832	1.339	KY 1927 (Colby Road)	
Winchester	2.473	3.980	US 60 (West Lexington Avenue)	
	2.719– 2.837	4.376– 4.566	I-64 / KY 627 Truck north to Mountain Parkway – Ashland, Lexington	North end of KY 627 Truck overlap; I-64 exit 94
	2.953	4.752	KY 2888 west (Rockwell Road) / Revilo Road / Rolling Hills Lane	Northern terminus; eastern terminus of KY 2888; continues as Rolling Hills Lane beyond KY 2888 / Revilo Road
1.000 mi = 1.609 km; 1.000 km = 0.621 mi: Concurrency terminus

=== Eastern segment ===
The entire route is in Clark County.

Location	mi	km	Destinations	Notes
	0.000	0.000	KY 89 (Irvine Road)	Southern terminus
	0.741	1.193	KY 15 (Ironworks Road)	
	1.140	1.835	KY 1960 (Ecton Road)	
Winchester	1.945	3.130	US 60 (Mt. Sterling Road)	
Winchester	2.372	3.817	KY 627 (North Maple Street / Paris Road) to I-64 / Old Paris Pike	Northern terminus; continues as Old Paris Pike beyond KY 627
1.000 mi = 1.609 km; 1.000 km = 0.621 mi
