= Blythewood (Richmond, Kentucky) =

Historic house in the US

- U.S. National Register of Historic Places
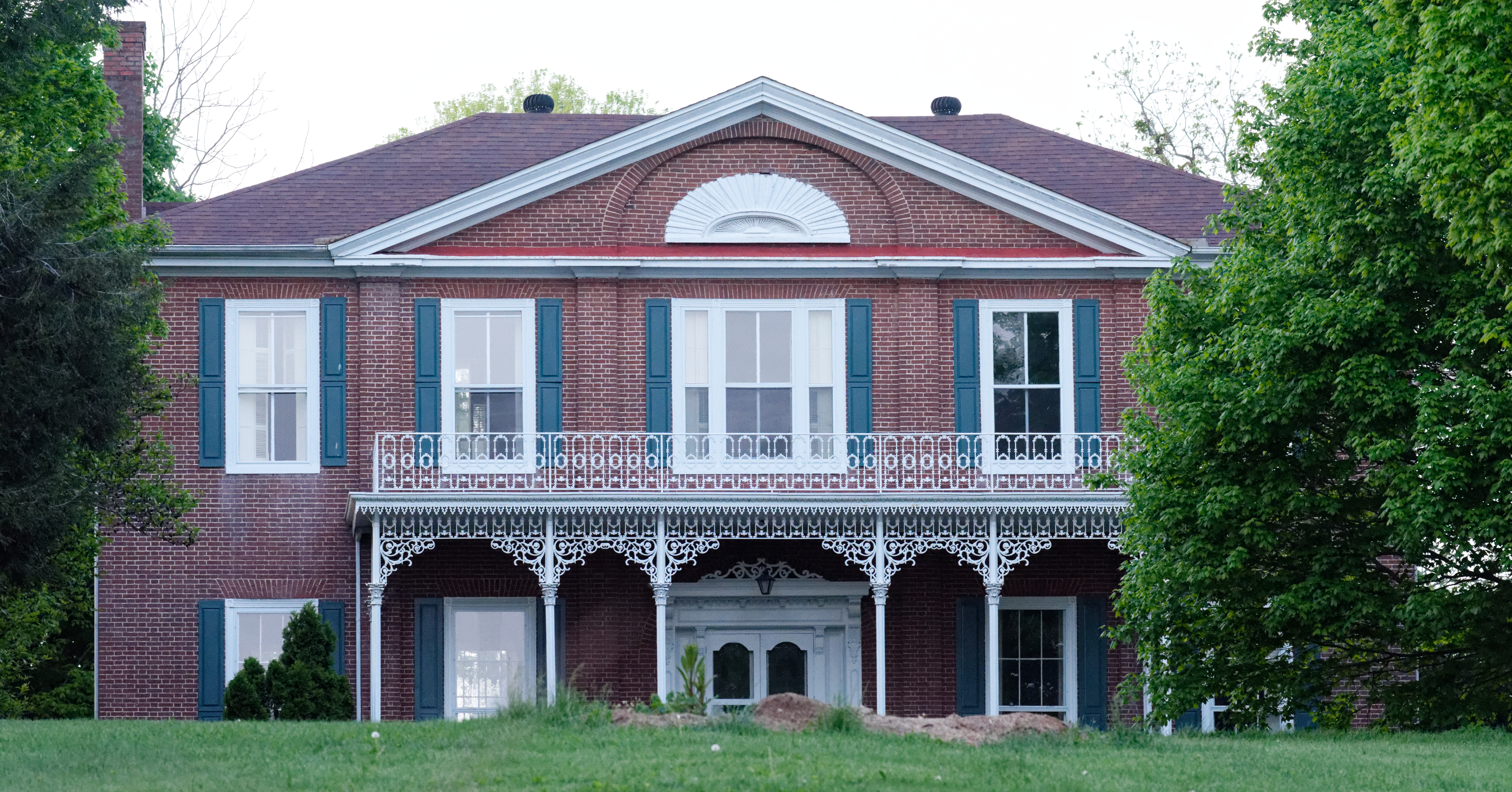
- Blythewood in 2018

- Location within Kentucky Location within the United States
- Location: Junction of Peytontown and Duncanon Rds., near Richmond, Kentucky
- Coordinates: 37°40′16″N 84°19′21″W
- Area: 8.6 acres (3.5 ha)
- Built: c.1840, 1870
- Built by: Maj. James Blythe
- Architectural style: Greek Revival, Italianate, Federal
- MPS: Madison County MRA
- NRHP reference No.: 88003330
- Added to NRHP: February 8, 1989

Blythewood, in Richmond in Madison County, Kentucky, was built circa 1840 and expanded in 1870. The property, including four contributing buildings, was listed on the National Register of Historic Places in 1989.

It is a two-story, five-bay brick house with brick chimneys. Its front facade has five bays and is built with a Flemish bond brick pattern; five-course common bond is used elsewhere.

Its current owners are Carroll and Charlotte Sutton. There is a large private Kentucky Derby party every year.
