= Kentucky Route 89 =

State highway in Kentucky, United States

Kentucky Route 89
- KY 89 highlighted in red

Route information
- Maintained by KYTC
- Length: 73.355 mi (118.053 km)

Major junctions
- South end: KY 490 near Livingston
- US 421 by McKee; US 60 in Winchester
- North end: KY 627 in Winchester

Location
- Country: United States
- State: Kentucky
- Counties: Rockcastle, Jackson, Estill, Clark

Highway system
- Kentucky State Highway System; Interstate; US; State; Parkways
← KY 88	→ KY 90

Kentucky Route 89 (KY 89) is a 73.355-mile-long (118.053 km) north–south two-lane state highway that runs from Kentucky Route 490 east of Livingston to Kentucky Route 627 in Winchester in the U.S. state of Kentucky. The highway goes through McKee, Irvine.

The route intersects with U.S. Route 421, Kentucky Route 52, Kentucky Route 499, Kentucky Route 974, and U.S. Route 60.

== Major intersections ==
County	Location	mi	km	Destinations	Notes
Rockcastle		0.000	0.000	KY 490 (S Upper River Road)	Southern terminus
Jackson		8.903	14.328	KY 2002 south	Northern terminus of KY 2002
Jackson		18.860	30.352	US 421 north	Southern end of US 421 concurrency
Jackson	McKee	19.407	31.233	US 421 south (Main Street)	Northern end of US 421 concurrency
Jackson		28.520	45.898	KY 3446 west (Lower Dry Fork Road)	Eastern terminus of KY 3446
Estill		39.721	63.925	KY 1209 east (Wagersville Road)	Western terminus of KY 1209
Estill		46.040	74.094	KY 851 south (Doe Creek Road)	Northern terminus of KY 851
Estill		46.891	75.464	KY 52 west (Richmond Road)	Southern end of KY 52 concurrency
Estill		46.965– 47.115	75.583– 75.824	Bridge over the Kentucky River	
Estill	Irvine	47.160	75.897	KY 52 east (River Drive)	Northern end of KY 52 concurrency
Estill	Irvine	47.200	75.961	KY 2461 east (Broadway Street)	Western terminus of KY 2461
Estill		48.599	78.213	KY 499 west (Joseph Proctor Memorial Bypass)	Eastern terminus of KY 499
Estill		48.896	78.690	KY 1705 north (White Oak Road)	Southern terminus of KY 1705
Estill		49.231	79.230	KY 1840 west (Winchester Road)	Eastern terminus of KY 1840
Estill		52.191	83.993	KY 794 south (Dry Branch Road)	Northern terminus of KY 794
Estill		53.599	86.259	KY 82 north (Spout Springs Road) to Mountain Parkway – Spout Springs, Clay City	Southern terminus of KY 82
Estill		55.594	89.470	KY 1886 west (Cressy Road)	Eastern terminus of KY 1886
Clark		61.137	98.390	KY 1028 west (Mina Station Road)	Eastern terminus of KY 1028
Clark		63.031	101.439	KY 974 east (Irvine Road) to KY 3369	Southern end of KY 974 overlap
Clark		66.878	107.630	KY 974 west (White Conkwright Road)	Northern end of KY 974 overlap
Clark		72.728	117.044	KY 1958 north (Veterans Memorial Parkway)	Southern terminus of KY 1958
Clark	Winchester	74.078	119.217	US 60 (North Main Street)	
Clark	Winchester	74.171	119.367	KY 627 (North Maple Street) to US 60	Northern terminus
1.000 mi = 1.609 km; 1.000 km = 0.621 mi
