= Kentucky Route 490 =

State highway in Kentucky, United States

Kentucky Route 490
- KY 490 highlighted in red

Route information
- Maintained by KYTC
- Length: 18.997 mi (30.573 km)

Major junctions
- South end: US 25 near East Bernstadt
- North end: US 25 in Livingston

Location
- Country: United States
- State: Kentucky
- Counties: Laurel, Rockcastle

Highway system
- Kentucky State Highway System; Interstate; US; State; Parkways
| ← KY 489 | → KY 491 |

Kentucky Route 490 (KY 490) is a 18.997-mile-long (30.573 km) state highway in Kentucky that runs from U.S. Route 25 southwest of East Bernstadt to U.S. Route 25 again in Livingston via East Bernstadt.

== Major intersections ==
| County | Location | mi | km | Destinations | Notes |
|---|---|---|---|---|---|
| Laurel | | 0.000 | 0.000 | US 25 (North Laurel Road) | Southern terminus |
| Laurel | East Bernstadt | 1.021 | 1.643 | KY 3094 east | South end of KY 3094 overlap |
| Laurel | East Bernstadt | 1.198 | 1.928 | KY 3094 west / School Street | North end of KY 3094 overlap |
| Laurel | East Bernstadt | 2.338 | 3.763 | KY 1376 east | Western terminus of KY 1376 |
| Laurel | | 2.955 | 4.756 | KY 3434 south (Old Richmond Road) | Northern terminus of KY 3434 |
| Laurel | | 3.635 | 5.850 | KY 1394 east | Western terminus of KY 1394 |
| Laurel | | 6.140 | 9.881 | KY 578 east (Greenmount Victory Road) | Western terminus of KY 578 |
| Laurel | | 8.161 | 13.134 | KY 1228 north | Southern terminus of KY 1228 |
| Rockcastle | | 11.558 | 18.601 | KY 89 north (Indian Creek Road) | Southern terminus of KY 89 |
| Rockcastle | Livingston | 18.872 | 30.372 | KY 1955 north (Red Hill Road) | Southern terminus of KY 1955 |
| Rockcastle | Livingston | 18.997 | 30.573 | US 25 (Main Street) | Northern terminus |
1.000 mi = 1.609 km; 1.000 km = 0.621 mi: Concurrency terminus
