= Union City, Kentucky =

Community in Madison County, KY

Coordinates: 37.797°N 84.198°W

Union City is a community in Madison County, Kentucky. An 1880 Gazetteer describes it as a post-village of Madison County 7 miles northeast of Richmond, Kentucky.

Vaudevillian Andrew Tribble was born in Union City. A historical marker commemorates his life at Union City Park.

Union City is home to Union City Baptist Church, a grocery store, and a Ruritan club.

In 1905 a railroad company was formed to connect it to Tiptonville in Lake County, Tennessee.

1905 Railroad statement is not true. Most likely it is confused with Union City, Tennessee which is in the county beside Lake County in North Western Tennessee. There has never been a railroad in Union City, Kentucky.

Union City is at the junction of Union City Road, 374, Walker Parke Road, and Doylesville Road.
