= Newby, Kentucky =

Unincorporated community in Kentucky, United States

- Unincorporated community
- Location within Kentucky Location within the United States
- Coordinates: 37°45′47″N 84°24′55″W
- Country: United States
- State: Kentucky
- County: Madison
- Elevation: 970 ft (300 m)
- Time zone: UTC-5 (Eastern (EST))
  - Summer (DST): UTC-4 (EDT)

Newby is an unincorporated community in Madison County, Kentucky. It is located 6 miles west of Richmond along Kentucky Route 1984.

== History ==
A post office called Newby was established in 1891, and remained in operation until 1939. The community is named after a prominent family from the area.
