= Cane Springs Primitive Baptist Church =

Historic church in Kentucky, United States

- U.S. National Register of Historic Places
- Location within Kentucky Location within the United States
- Nearest city: College Hill, Kentucky
- Coordinates: 37°49′37″N 84°7′51″W
- Area: 1 acre (0.40 ha)
- Built: c.1812-13
- NRHP reference No.: 78001381
- Added to NRHP: December 22, 1978

Cane Springs Primitive Baptist Church is a historic Primitive Baptist church in College Hill, Kentucky. It was built in c.1812-1813 and added to the National Register of Historic Places in 1978.

It is a one-and-a-half-story brick structure, with brick laid in common bond, built on a fieldstone foundation. It has a two-bay front gable facade, and is three bays along the sides.

The congregation was organized in 1803 as part of the Great Awakening, and built a log church structure that year. This brick church, built on land donated later, is the oldest church building in Madison County. The church belonged to the North District Association of Separate Baptists.

The church is located on College Hill Road, about 8 miles (13 km) east of Richmond, Kentucky.
