= Kentucky Route 627 =

Highway in Kentucky, United States

Kentucky Route 627
- KY 627 highlighted in red

Route information
- Maintained by KYTC
- Length: 30.367 mi (48.871 km)
- Existed: 1972–present

Major junctions
- South end: US 25 / US 421 at Richmond
- I-75 at Richmond; US 60 at Winchester; I-64
- North end: US 68 Bus. in downtown Paris

Location
- Country: United States
- State: Kentucky
- Counties: Madison, Clark, Bourbon

Highway system
- Kentucky State Highway System; Interstate; US; State; Parkways
← KY 626	→ KY 628

Kentucky Route 627 (KY 627) is a 30.367-mile-long (48.871 km) north–south state highway in east-central Kentucky, United States. It traverses portions of northern Madison, Clark, and southern Bourbon counties.

== Route description ==
KY 627 begins in northern Madison County at the concurrently running part of highways U.S. Route 25 and U.S. Route 421 (US 25/US 421) north of Richmond. Just east of that is an interchange with Interstate 75 (I-75). The state highway continues northward to pass near Fort Boonesborough State Park (KY 388 provides access to that destination) and enters Clark County.

KY 627 arrives at Winchester, where it crosses US 60, and later I-64. The state highway goes further north to enter Bourbon County and into the city of Paris, where it terminates in downtown at a junction with a one-way couplet in US 68 Business.

== History ==
The routing of KY 627 from near Fort Boonesborough to Paris, along with much of KY 388 in Madison County was originally part of US 227 when it existed from 1928 until the U.S. Route's 1972 decommissioning. The KY 627 designation was assigned by the Kentucky Department of Highways the same year as the decommissioning of US 227.

The original KY 627 ran from KY 234 to US 231 in Bowling Green; this was given to the city of Bowling Green, but became part of KY 880 on February 9, 1983.

== Major intersections ==
County	Location	mi	km	Destinations	Notes
Madison		0.000	0.000	To US 25 / US 421 / I-75 – Richmond, Lexington	Southern terminus
Madison		0.220	0.354	KY 2878 (Simpson Lane)	
Madison		1.613	2.596	KY 3377 – Redhouse	Northern terminus of KY 3377
Madison		5.688	9.154	KY 388 (Red House Road) – Fort Boonesborough State Park, Richmond	Northern terminus of KY 388; original alignment of US 227 (1928-1972)
Clark	Boonesborough	6.183	9.951	KY 418 west / KY 1924 east (Ford Road)	Eastern terminus of KY 418
Clark	Forest Grove	9.858	15.865	KY 1923 (Waterworks Road)	
Clark	Winchester	12.457	20.048	KY 1958 (Winchester Bypass) to KY 627 Truck / I-64	Southern terminus of KY 627 truck; southern end of KY 1958 concurrency
Clark	Winchester	13.478	21.691	KY 1927 (Colby Road)	
Clark	Winchester	13.771	22.162	KY 1923 (South Maple Street)	Northern terminus of KY 1923
Clark	Winchester	13.925	22.410	US 60 (Lexington Avenue) – Lexington, Mount Sterling	
Clark	Winchester	14.185	22.829	KY 89 (Washington Street) / KY 1958	Northern terminus of KY 89; northern end of KY 1958 concurrency
Clark	Winchester	15.114	24.324	KY 1958 (Old Paris Pike)	
Clark	Winchester	15.334	24.678	To I-64 east / Mountain Parkway – Ashland	Eastbound off ramps from I-64 east and on ramps to I-64 east
Clark	Winchester	15.389	24.766	I-64 west / KY 627 Truck south – Lexington	Westbound off ramps from I-64 west and on ramps to I-64 west; northern terminus of KY 627 Truck
Bourbon		22.204	35.734	KY 57 – Lexington, North Middletown	
Bourbon		23.230	37.385	KY 3364	Western terminus of KY 3364
Bourbon	Paris	30.323	48.800	US 68 Bus. east to US 460 – Georgetown, Maysville, Mount Sterling	One way-street, no left turn
Bourbon	Paris	30.367	48.871	US 68 Bus. to US 27 / US 68 – Lexington	Northern terminus; one-way street, no right turn
1.000 mi = 1.609 km; 1.000 km = 0.621 mi: Concurrency terminus; Incomplete access

== Kentucky Route 627 Truck ==
Kentucky Route 627 Truck
- Location: Winchester
- Length: 4.732 mi (7.615 km)

Kentucky Route 627 Truck (KY 627 Truck) is a 4.372-mile-long (7.036 km) truck route of KY 627 around Winchester. It follows KY 1958 (Winchester Bypass) on the west side of town, and I-64 between exits 94 and 96 on the north side of town.

=== Major intersections ===
The entire route is in Winchester, Clark County.

mi	km	Exit	Destinations	Notes
0.000	0.000		KY 627 (Boonesboro Road / Boone Avenue)	Southern terminus; southern terminus of western segment of KY 1958; south end of KY 1958 overlap; continues as Hubbard Road beyond KY 627
0.832	1.339		KY 1927 (Colby Road)	
2.473	3.980		US 60 (West Lexington Avenue)	
2.719– 2.837	4.376– 4.566	94	KY 1958 north (Van Meter Road) / To Rockwell Road I-64 west – Lexington	North end of KY 1958 overlap; south end of I-64 overlap
4.732	7.615	96	KY 627 – Paris, Winchester I-64 east – Ashland	Northern terminus; north end of I-64 overlap; continues as I-64 beyond KY 627
1.000 mi = 1.609 km; 1.000 km = 0.621 mi: Concurrency terminus
