= Boone Station =

Historic site in Fayette County, Kentucky, U.S.

Coordinates: 37°57′11″N 84°21′18″W

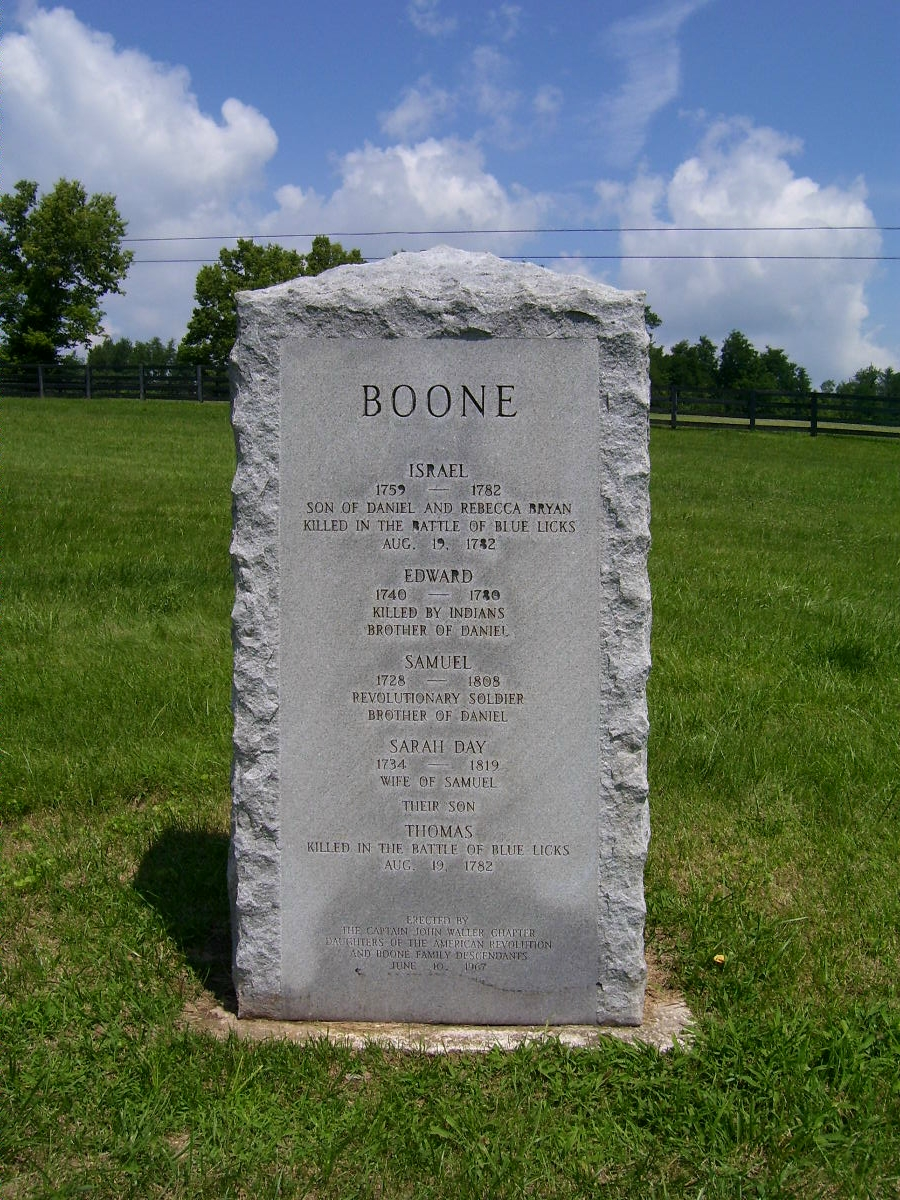
This monument, placed in 1967 by the Daughters of the American Revolution, marks the site of Boone Station. On the monument are the names of five Boone family members thought at the time to have been buried there. Three of the men listed were killed elsewhere and were probably buried where they died.

Boone Station State Historic Site was a 46-acre (190,000 m^{2}) Kentucky State Historic Site on Boone's Creek near Athens in Fayette County, Kentucky, USA.

== Boone's New Station ==
Boone's Station, initially known as Boone's New Station to distinguish it from the fort which is now known as Boonesborough, was the home of Daniel Boone, the famed frontiersman, from 1779 until 1782. Athens at the time was named "Cross Plains" and Boone's son Israel established the fort nearby in 1776.

During the American Revolution, Daniel moved to his son Israel's settlement, which consisted at its height of 15 to 20 families. Like other "stations" in frontier Kentucky, Boone's Station probably consisted of a number of cabins which shared a common outside wall to defend against American Indian raids. Unlike Boonesborough, Boone Station saw little action during the Revolutionary War, although a number of Boone's Station residents were killed in the war at nearby locations. Daniel's brother Edward was killed by Shawnee in 1780 while hunting with Daniel in present-day Bourbon County. Boone's son Israel and his nephew Thomas were killed at the Battle of Blue Licks in 1782.

Boone eventually lost or sold his title to the station land as a result of the chaotic, overlapping land claim system of frontier Kentucky. Exactly when he moved away is uncertain. In 1783, he either resettled his family in a cabin at nearby Marble Creek, where he lived for a couple of years, or he relocated to Limestone (now part of Maysville), near the Ohio River. Boone Station ceased to exist as a community by 1791.

Boone moved with his family to St. Charles County, Missouri in 1799, after losing the last of his land claims. It was then under Spanish rule, but was acquired by the United States in 1803 under the Louisiana Purchase. This area was east of the Missouri River in its north–south orientation. Boone lived there, in what became known as Defiance, Missouri, for the last 20 years of his life.

The site was transferred to David's Fork Baptist Church in December 2018.

== See also ==
- Boonesborough, the original Boone's Station
  - Fort Boonesborough State Park, the recreated stockade nearby
- Booneville, also known as Boone's Station in the 19th century
- Squire Boone's Station, a settlement established by Daniel's brother
