= Mt. Pleasant Christian Church =

Historic church in Kentucky, United States

- U.S. National Register of Historic Places
- Location within Kentucky Location within the United States
- Nearest city: Richmond, Kentucky
- Coordinates: 37°50′16″N 84°19′35″W
- Area: 2 acres (0.81 ha)
- Built: c.1849
- Architectural style: Gothic Revival
- MPS: Madison County MRA
- NRHP reference No.: 88003331
- Added to NRHP: February 8, 1989

The Mt. Pleasant Christian Church in Richmond, in Madison County, Kentucky is a historic church. It was built in c.1849 and added to the National Register of Historic Places in 1989.

It was deemed significant "as an example of how Madison County builders used some of the elements of the Gothic Revival style such as the steeplypitched roof and double-lancet windows to ornament a rural church building."
