= Moberly, Kentucky =

Unincorporated community in Kentucky, United States

- Unincorporated community
- Location within Kentucky Location within the United States
- Coordinates: 37°44′30″N 84°10′58″W
- Country: United States
- State: Kentucky
- County: Madison
- Elevation: 879 ft (268 m)
- Time zone: UTC-5 (Eastern (EST))
  - Summer (DST): UTC-4 (EDT)
- GNIS feature ID: 498460

Moberly is an unincorporated community located in Madison County, Kentucky, United States. A post office was opened in 1891, named after its first postmaster, local landowner John Sterling Moberly. The post office closed in 1957. It is located at the intersection of Kentucky Route 52 and Kentucky Route 374.
