= Mt. Zion Christian Church =

Historic church in Kentucky, United States

- U.S. National Register of Historic Places
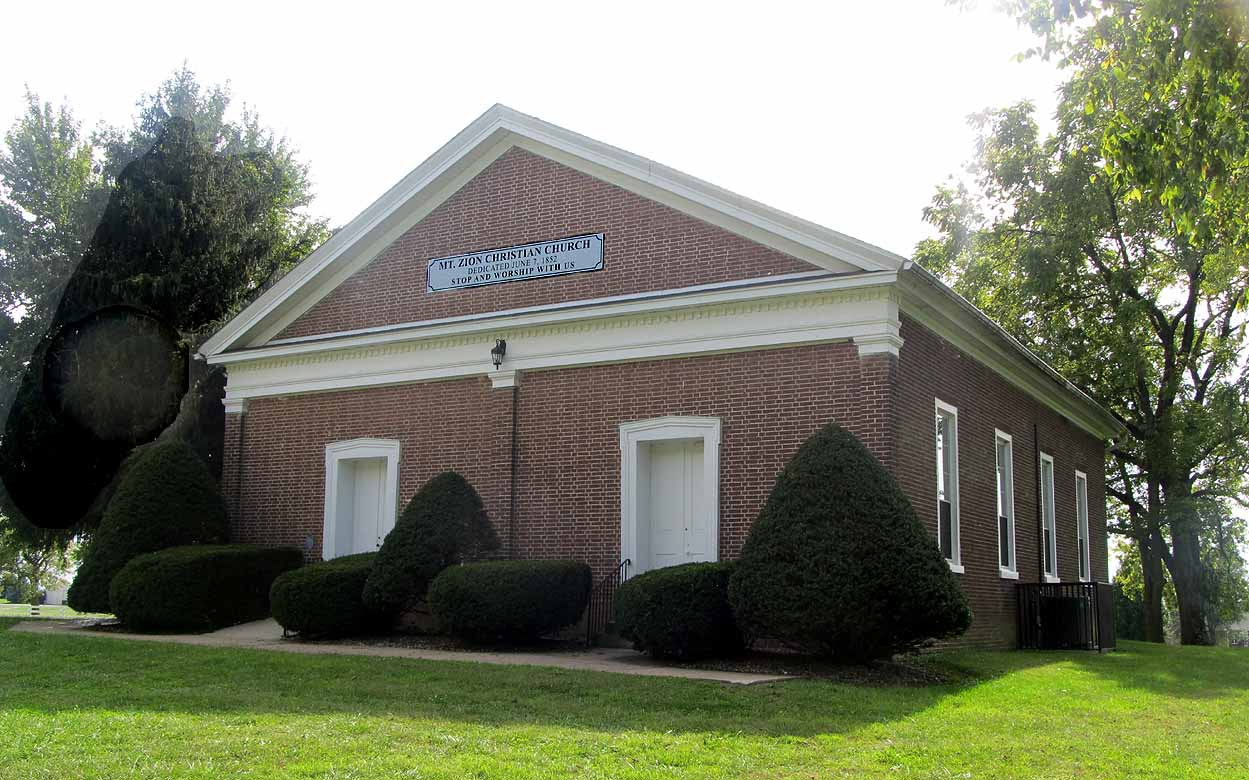

- Location within Kentucky Location within the United States
- Nearest city: Richmond, Kentucky
- Coordinates: 37°40′25″N 84°15′14″W
- Area: 0.8 acres (0.32 ha)
- Built: 1852
- Architectural style: Greek Revival
- MPS: Madison County MRA
- NRHP reference No.: 88003318
- Added to NRHP: February 8, 1989

The Mt. Zion Christian Church in Richmond, Kentucky, was completed in 1852 and added to the National Register of Historic Places in 1989.

Church attendees included slaveholders and their slaves.

It has cannonballs embedded in its south wall, from the American Civil War's Battle of Richmond on August 29 and 30, 1862. The church was used as a hospital.

It is a brick structure, with brick laid in double-stretcher Flemish bond and in American bond. Its facade has three pilasters supporting an entablature which gives a pedimented appearance, consistent with Greek Revival style, but the church's Jack arches are elements of Federal style.
