= Bybee, Virginia =

Unincorporated community in Virginia, United States

Coordinates: 37°55′33″N 78°12′20″W

Bybee is an unincorporated community in Fluvanna County, in the U.S. state of Virginia.
