= Speedwell, Kentucky =

Unincorporated community in Kentucky, United States

- Unincorporated community
- Location within Kentucky Location within the United States
- Coordinates: 37°40′27″N 84°10′31″W
- Country: United States
- State: Kentucky
- County: Madison
- Elevation: 928 ft (283 m)
- Time zone: UTC-5 (Eastern (EST))
  - Summer (DST): UTC-4 (EDT)
- GNIS feature ID: 504047

Speedwell is an unincorporated community located in Madison County, Kentucky, United States. A post office was opened for the community in 1852, and closed in 1939. It is located at the junction of Kentucky Route 374 and Kentucky Route 499.

The community is named for Congressman John Speed Smith.

The Viney Fork Baptist Church on the National Register of Historic Places is located within the community.
