= College Hill, Kentucky =

Unincorporated community in Kentucky, United States

- Unincorporated community
- Location within Kentucky Location within the United States
- Coordinates: 37°47′12″N 84°7′24″W
- Country: United States
- State: Kentucky
- County: Madison
- Elevation: 892 ft (272 m)
- Time zone: UTC-5 (Eastern (EST))
  - Summer (DST): UTC-4 (EDT)
- GNIS feature ID: 507730

College Hill is an unincorporated community located in Madison County, Kentucky, United States. Its post office is closed. It was also known as Texas. It is located on Kentucky Route 977 north of Waco.

The Cane Springs Primitive Baptist Church on the National Register of Historic Places is located within the community.
