= Confederate Army of Kentucky =

Army of Kentucky
- Battle Flag of the Army of Kentucky
- Active: August 25, 1862–October 8, 1862
- Disbanded: Incorporated into Army of Tennessee
- Country: Confederate States
- Branch: Confederate army
- Garrison/HQ: Knoxville, Tennessee
- Engagements: Confederate Heartland Offensive

Commanders
- Notable commanders: Edmund Kirby Smith

The Army of Kentucky was a Confederate army during the American Civil War.

The designation "Army of Kentucky" was given August 25, 1862 to the field army Kirby Smith led into eastern Kentucky during the Confederate Heartland Offensive. The army was drawn from troops of the Confederate Department of Eastern Tennessee, which had been created with Smith as commander in February 1862.

The army consisted of the infantry divisions of Henry Heth, Patrick Cleburne, Thomas J. Churchill and Carter L. Stevenson and two small cavalry brigades under John Hunt Morgan and John S. Scott. After the Battle of Perryville, Kirby Smith was promoted and given command of the Department of Trans-Mississippi, and the army was incorporated into the Army of Tennessee.
