= Viney Fork Baptist Church =

Historic church in Kentucky, United States

- U.S. National Register of Historic Places
- Location within Kentucky Location within the United States
- Nearest city: Speedwell, Kentucky
- Coordinates: 37°40′26″N 84°10′38″W
- Area: 0.7 acres (0.28 ha)
- Built: 1802
- Architectural style: Antebellum vernacular
- MPS: Madison County MRA
- NRHP reference No.: 88003317
- Added to NRHP: February 8, 1989

Viney Fork Baptist Church is a historic Baptist church in Speedwell, Kentucky, United States. The church is located at the intersection of Kentucky Route 374 and Kentucky Route 499. It was built in 1802 and added to the National Register of Historic Places in 1989.

The church is a one-and-a-half-story cut sandstone building. Its gable end has a short, squared wooden bell tower. It was deemed "an example of a rural country church notable for its use of windows whose blunted arched shape represent a local interpretation of the Gothic style."

== History ==
The congregation of Viney Fork Baptist Church was organized on March 25, 1797, under the guidance of Peter Woods and Christopher Harris from Dreaming Creek and Andrew Tribble and Isaac Newland from Tates Creek. The initial log structure, likely the first church building constructed by white settlers in Kentucky, was replaced by the current sandstone building in 1802.

The church was founded as and remained a Primitive Baptist congregation until 1845, when it transitioned to a Missionary Baptist Church. The upstairs balcony of the church, used as a school during the week and as a place for slaves to worship on Sundays, was removed in 1866. Following the Civil War, the church supported the establishment of Goodloe's Chapel for freed slaves, which remains an active black Baptist church today.
