= Kirksville Christian Church =

Historic church in Kentucky, United States

- U.S. National Register of Historic Places
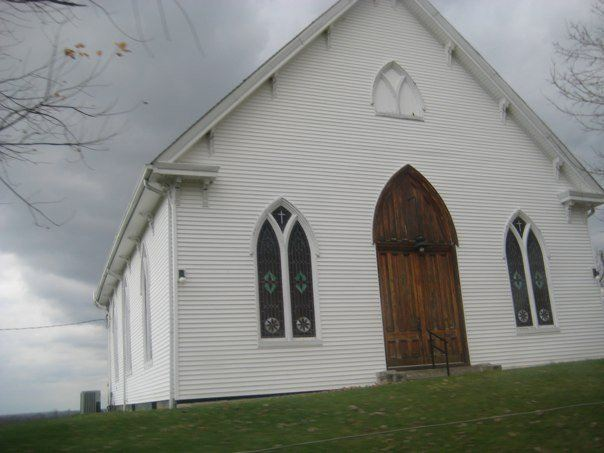

- Location within Kentucky Location within the United States
- Location: KY 595, Kirksville, Kentucky
- Coordinates: 37°39′47″N 84°24′27″W
- Area: 0.8 acres (0.32 ha)
- Built: 1878
- Architectural style: Gothic
- MPS: Madison County MRA
- NRHP reference No.: 88003325
- Added to NRHP: February 8, 1989

Kirksville Christian Church is a historic Disciples of Christ church building in Kirksville, Kentucky. It was built in 1878 and added to the National Register of Historic Places in 1989.

== History ==
The Kirksville congregation of Disciples of Christ was founded in 1849, with the present frame building constructed in 1878. The Gothic Revival church features a steep gable roof with narrow angled brackets under the eaves and at the gable ends. One gable end forms the front facade that contains two Gothic-arched windows with stained-glass, a Gothic-arched double-leaf entrance, and a pointed lunette. On each side facade three pointed-arched windows also contain stained glass. Although replaced in 1975, the design of the glass is based on that found in two original windows in the apse on the rear facade. The pipe organ, used in the First Christian Church of Lancaster, Kentucky, from 1904 to 1952, originally was pumped by hand.

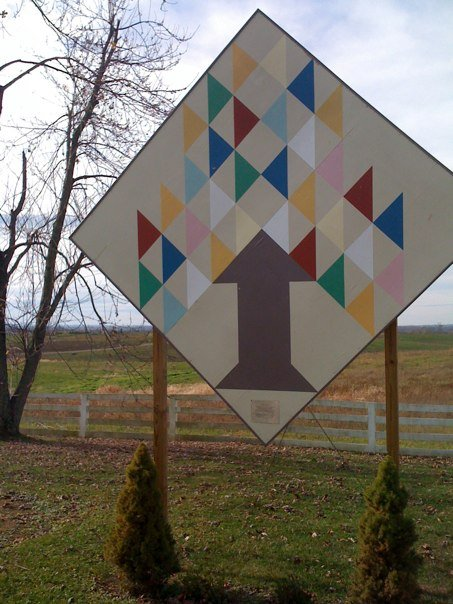
Kirksville Christian Church quilt

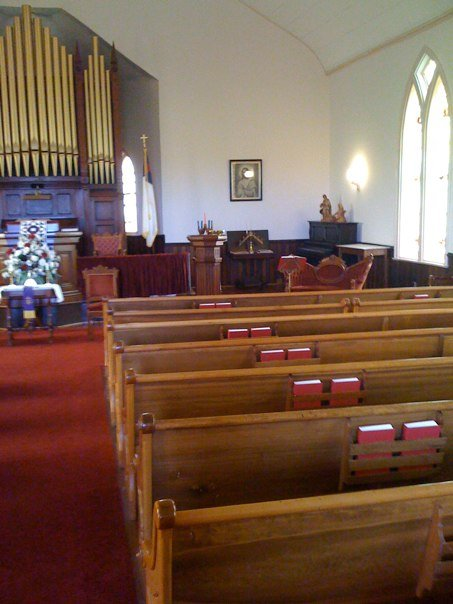
Kirksville Christian Church - inside

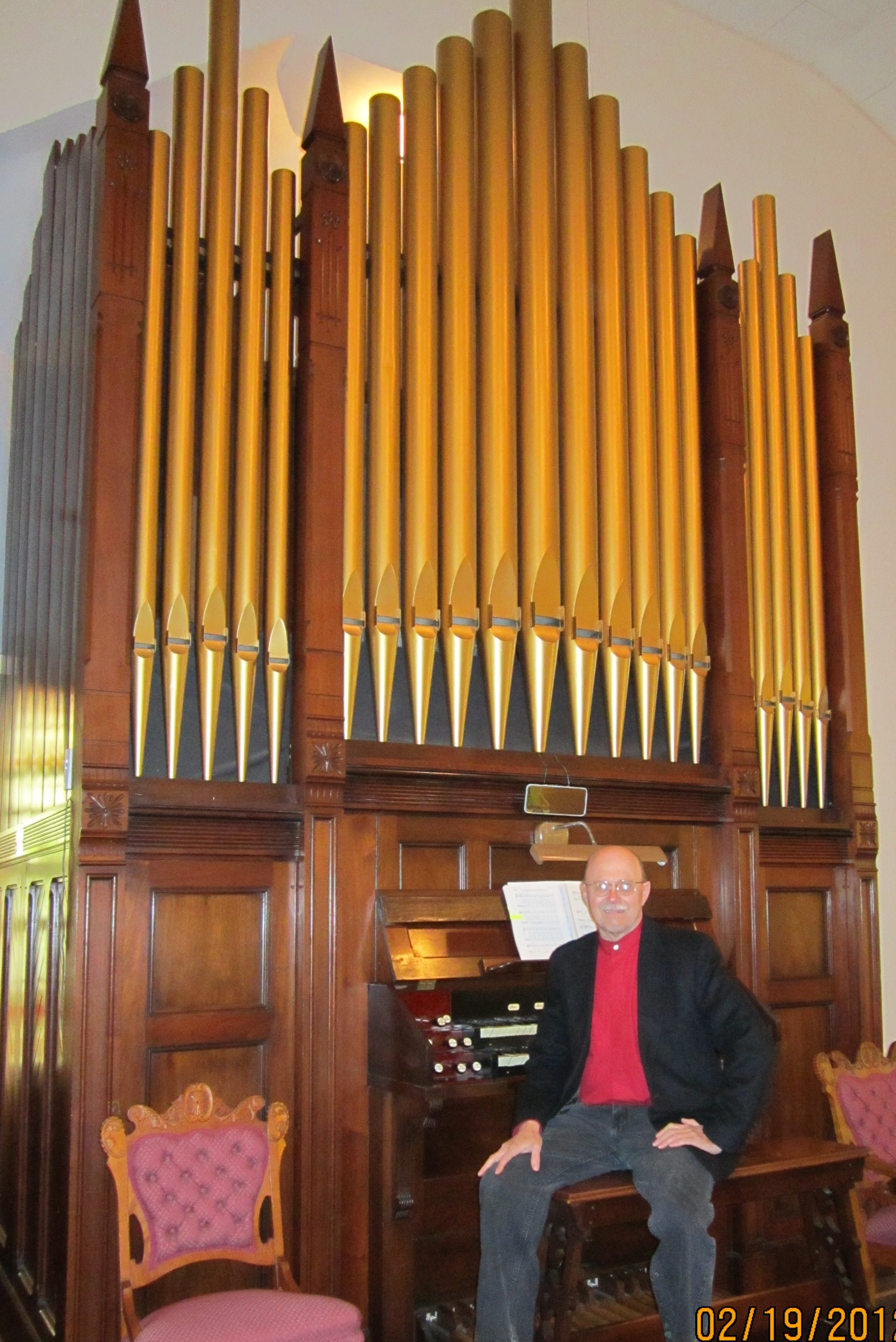
Pipe organ at Kirksville Christian Church
