= Bybee Pottery =

Pottery company in Kentucky, US

- U.S. National Register of Historic Places
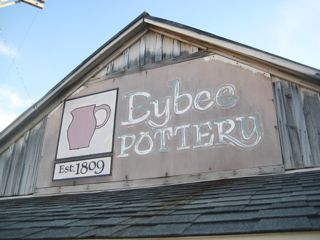

- Location within Kentucky Location within the United States
- Location: Kentucky Route 52, Bybee, Kentucky
- Coordinates: 37°43′58″N 84°7′29″W
- Area: 2 acres (0.81 ha)
- Built: c.1845
- NRHP reference No.: 78001380
- Added to NRHP: July 24, 1978

Bybee Pottery was a pottery company based in Bybee, a community in Madison County, Kentucky, USA. It was founded in 1809 by Webster Cornelison. Members of the same Cornelison family continued to make and sell pottery until 2011. Bybee Pottery sold a wide variety of products, with a focus on utilitarian ware, and encouraged customers to interact with the artisans and tour the building that had survived six generations and the Civil War.

Located in a vernacular structure with the appearance of a barn, Bybee Pottery was considered the oldest pottery operation in the United States west of the Appalachian Mountains. Employees procured the yellow clay from a nearby source close to the banks of the Kentucky River.

The pottery's earliest years are undocumented; the earliest clear references to the facility are sales records from 1845, but even this date demonstrates that Cornelison is Madison County's oldest industry. Pottery was first thrown at Cornelison by a local farmer, James Eli Cornelison, who observed that his farm contained substantial amounts of high-quality clay that was ready for industrial purposes without any preparation. A family cousin, Ron Stambaugh, owned a retail outlet that sold Bybee pottery among other items under the name, A Little Bit of Bybee.

Bybee Pottery Company sold pieces at the pottery itself, as well as through catalogs. A line of Bybee ware, known as the Selden-Bybee line, was sold alongside several other small pottery companies by Howard G. Selden from a New York showroom.

The pottery facility was listed on the National Register of Historic Places in 1978 as Cornelison Pottery. The fifth and sixth generations of the Cornelison family in the business continued to operate the pottery on a commercial basis.

In February 2011, Bybee Pottery laid off its eight remaining employees, sold off remaining in-store inventory, and suspended operations. While it was neither producing nor selling products at the time, the owners stated that there was product formed that could be fired. As of 2019 new pieces were still being produced, but at a much smaller rate, and sold out of a new shop in Middletown, Kentucky.

== Style ==
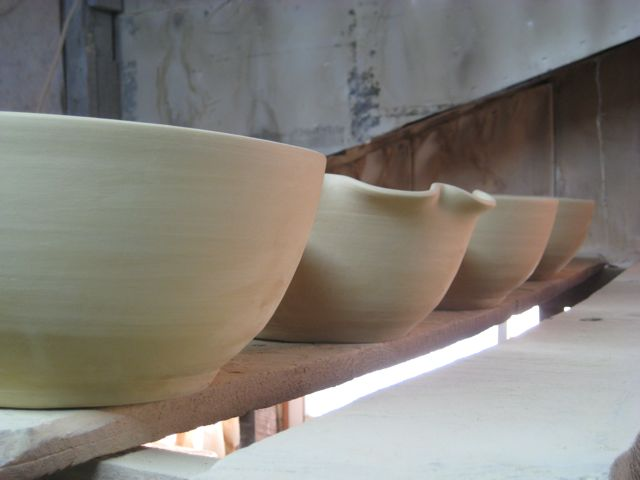
Unglazed Bybee Pottery bowls.

The majority of Bybee production focused on utilitarian ware. In advertisements, they emphasized the waterproof function of their glazes. A line of dinnerware produced by Ernest Cornelison was the most predominant of the utilitarian ware produced after the 1940s. However, for a period mostly between 1915 and the 1940s, the company also produced patio and garden ware in bright glazes.

Bybee utilitarian ware was produced with a combination of methods, including some use of jiggering- soft clay turned in a mold of a throwing wheel- as well as traditional throwing methods. The use of molds produced uniform shapes of pots, but the glazes of the pottery were often layered and distinct. In particular, a specialized type of glaze referred to as Bybee Blue was distinctive for the pottery. This shade of blue was compared by the pottery itself to a Delft, with some variation in lightness and darkness. The ware produced by Bybee tended to be thicker and heavier than the average piece of artisan utilitarian ware, a stylistic marker of the Cornelison tradition.
