= Boonesborough, Kentucky =

Historic site in Kentucky

Coordinates: 37°54′30″N 84°16′19″W

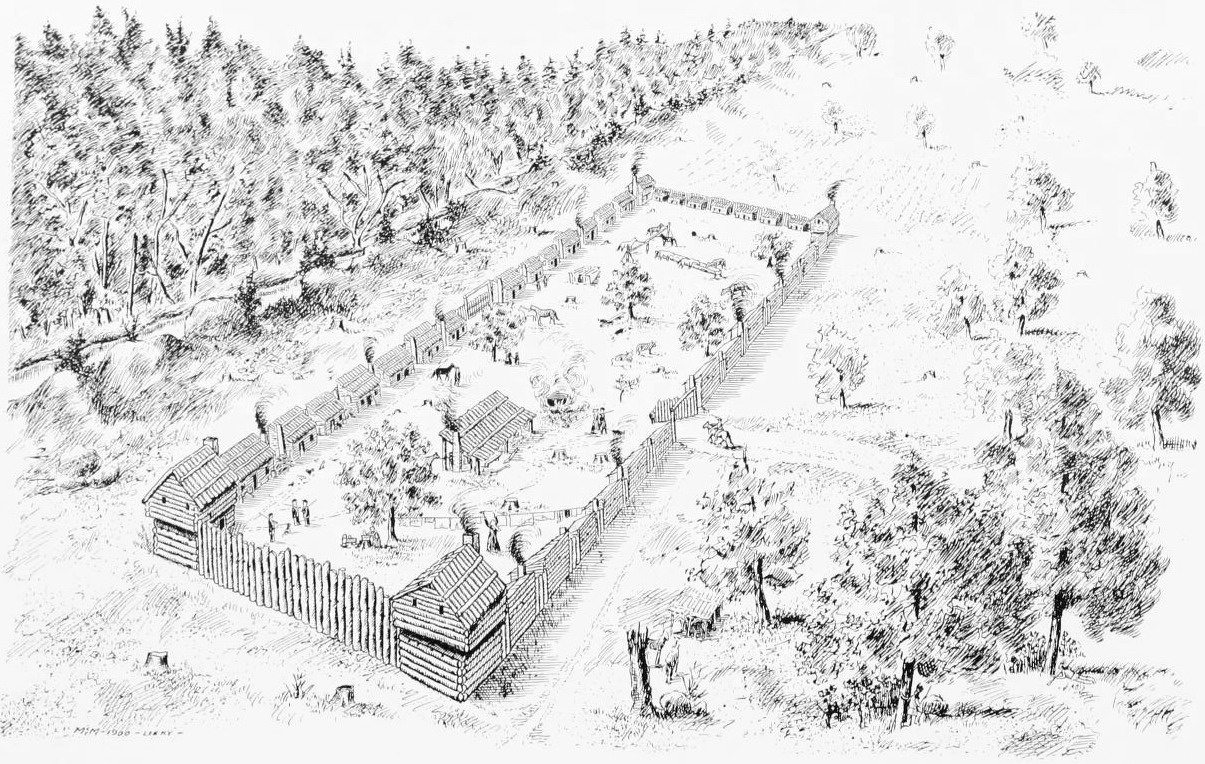
Boonesborough in 1778 (from Boonesborough... by George Washington Ranck, 1901).

Boonesborough or Boonesboro is an unincorporated community in Madison County, Kentucky, United States. Founded by famed frontiersman Daniel Boone in 1775 as one of the first English-speaking settlements west of the Appalachian Mountains, Boonesborough lies in the central part of the state along the Kentucky River and is the site of Fort Boonesborough State Park, which includes the Kentucky River Museum. The park site has been rebuilt to look like a working fort of the time that Boone resided there.

Boonesborough is part of the Richmond-Berea micropolitan area. It is located at the junction of Kentucky Route 388 and Kentucky Route 627.

== History ==
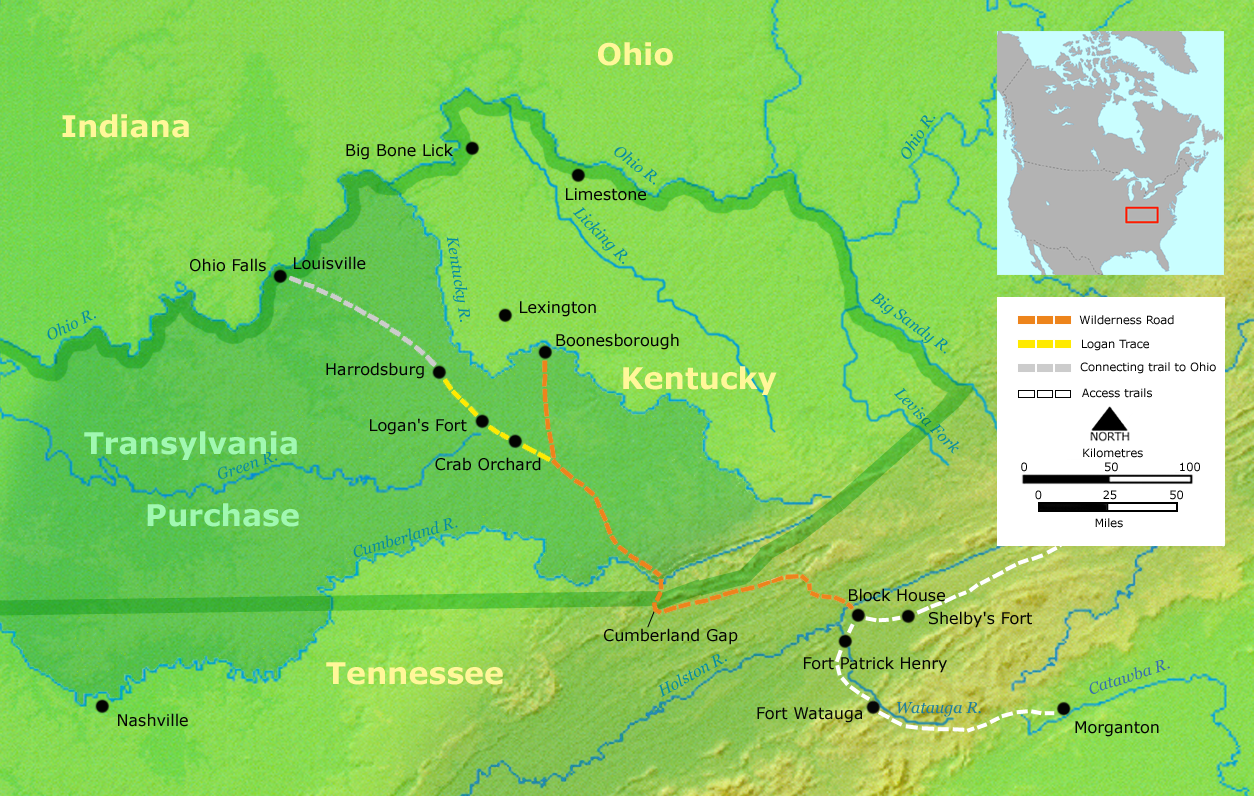
The Transylvania Purchase at Sycamore Shoals in Elizabethton, Tennessee and the Wilderness Road into Kentucky.

Boonesborough was founded as Boone's Station by the frontiersman Daniel Boone while working for Richard Henderson and Nathanial Hart of the Transylvania Company. Boone led a group of settlers (which included a number of enslaved African Americans) through the mountains from Fort Watauga (present-day Elizabethton in Tennessee), carving the Wilderness Road through the Cumberland Gap, and established Fort Boonesborough. Boone lived there from 1775 to 1779. The region was at that time part of the Commonwealth of Virginia, which officially chartered Boonesborough in October 1779. It was one of the first English-speaking communities west of the Appalachian Mountains. Boone successfully led his fellow settlers during the Siege of Boonesborough in 1778. He then moved to his son Israel's settlement at Boone's New Station near present-day Athens, Kentucky.

Although the town served as a way-station for pioneers venturing further into Kentucky during the 1780s and 1790s, it never attracted a significant long-term population, and thus slowly declined. By 1877, Boonesborough had "almost disappeared as a village".

== See also ==
- Boone's New Station, now Boone Station State Historic Site
- Booneville, originally known as Boone's Station
- Squire Boone's Station, established by Daniel's brother
