= Squire Boone's Station =

Coordinates: 38°14′52″N 85°12′49″W

Squire Boone's Station, also known as Painted Stone Station, was an 18th-century settlement in Kentucky in the United States. It was established in late 1779 or in the spring of 1780 by Squire Boone, Daniel Boone's pioneer brother, on the Clear Fork of Brashear's Creek 2 miles (3.2 km) north of present-day Shelbyville. Its alternate name came from the creekside rock painted with Boone's name and the date of his visit in 1776 when he was first scouting and claiming the area. Squire Boone's Station was the first large settlement in present-day Shelby County and counted Capt. Robert Tyler among its residents.

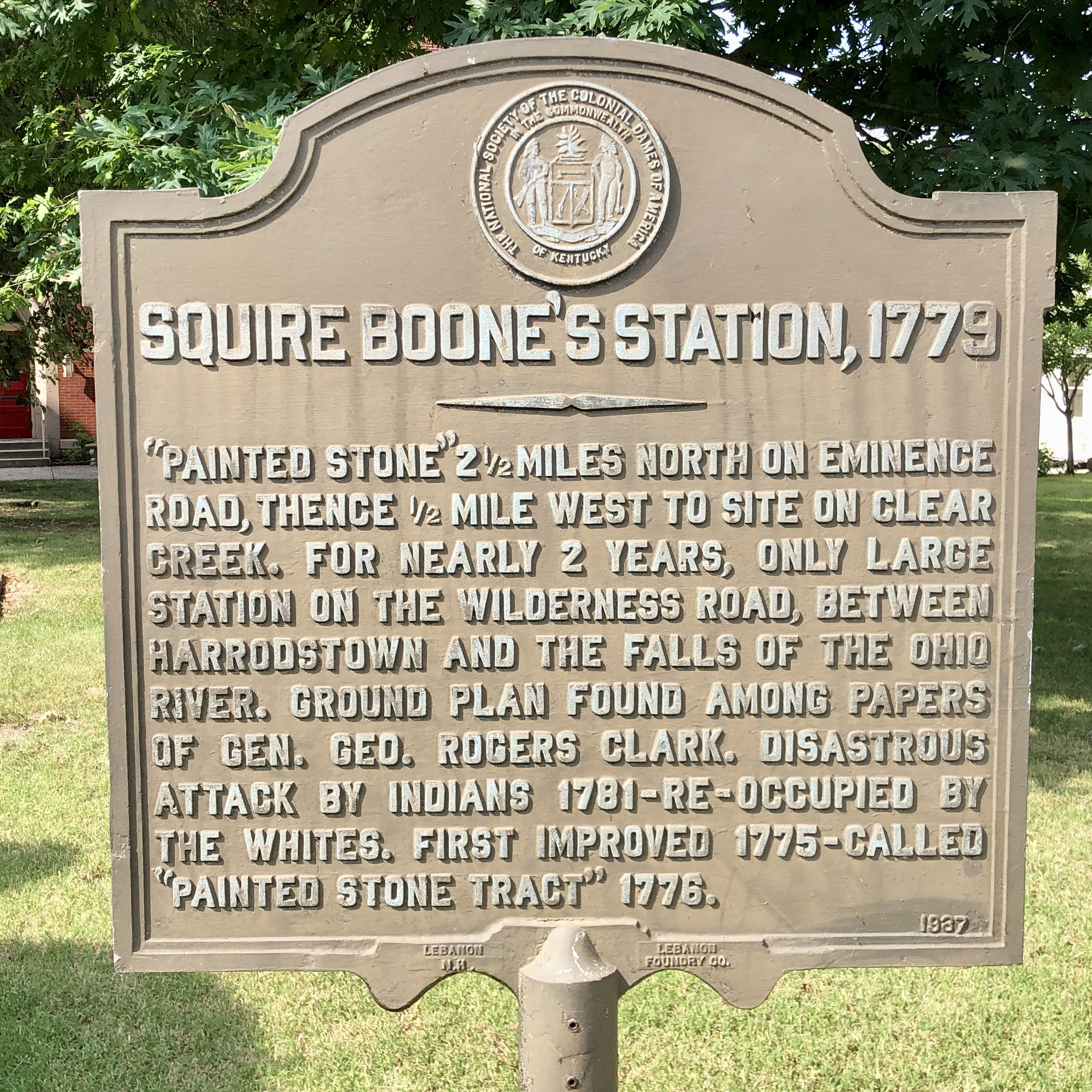
Historical marker in Shelbyville, Kentucky about Squire Boone's Station.

The fortified settlement was attacked by about 20 Indians in April 1781. Boone was hit twice, once in his right side and once through the bones in his right arm, injuries which appeared fatal and required months of recovery. His right arm was 1.5 inches (38 mm) shorter than his left for the rest of his life. In September, warned of an imminent attack by Maj. Bland Ballard, most settlers abandoned the site for Linn's Station, but Squire Boone's injury forced his family to remain; a shortage of packhorses also caused the widow Hinton's family to remain as well. The refugees were attacked roughly two-thirds of the way to Linn's Station by Indians and British soldiers under Capt. Alexander McKee in the Long Run Massacre. The families at Squire Boone's Station were rescued a few days later by a 300-man party from the Falls. An attempt at returning to the station two or three weeks later failed when he ran into an Indian party; he spent the winter at Low Dutch Station and later settled at Fort Harrod.

Squire Boone returned to the station in late 1783 with several families including his cousin Samuel Boone's. They arrived in the middle of winter to find the entire site burnt to the ground. The Boones remained and over the next year Squire built a grist- and sawmill.

Boone's land speculation succeeded for a number of years before failing in 1786, resulting in the loss of all of his property (including the station) to his creditors and his removal to Well's Station. In 1786, Squire Boone's Station was turned over to a Colonel Lynch, and its name was changed to "Lynch’s Station".

Upon the creation of Shelby County in 1792, Squire Boone's Station was considered as a site for the county court but that honor was given to Shelbyville after local landowner William Shannon donated land for the erection of public buildings.

== See also ==
- Station, a frontier defensive structure
- Boone's Station, now known as "Boonesborough", founded by Daniel Boone
- Boone's New Station, now known as "Boone Station State Historic Site", founded by Daniel Boone
- Boone's Station, now known as "Booneville", named in Daniel Boone's honor
