= Ruthton, Kentucky =

Unincorporated community in Kentucky, United States

- Unincorporated community
- Location within Kentucky Location within the United States
- Coordinates: 37°43′58″N 84°26′1″W
- Country: United States
- State: Kentucky
- County: Madison
- Elevation: 705 ft (215 m)
- Time zone: UTC-5 (Eastern (EST))
  - Summer (DST): UTC-4 (EDT)
- GNIS feature ID: 508991

Ruthton is an unincorporated community located in Madison County, Kentucky, United States. A post office for the community was opened in 1884, but closed down in 1915.
