= Churchill Weavers =

Defunct American handweaving company

Churchill Weavers was a handweaving company that operated from 1922 to 2007 in Berea, Kentucky, an area of Appalachia long associated with handcrafts.

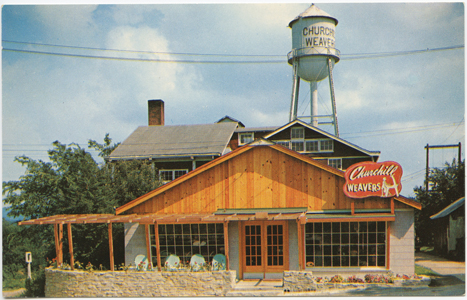
Color postcard showing the Churchill Weavers building, ca. 1950

It was the first company to mass-produce handwoven products for a national market.

== Background ==
David Carroll (D.C.) Churchill (1873 – 1969) and Eleanor Franzen Churchill (1888 – 1981) started Churchill Weavers in part to bring employment opportunity to Appalachian women and men. They previously were not entrepreneurs, but they had a thorough understanding of weaving from both an engineer's and a weaver's viewpoint. They brought to their work the combined skills of mechanical engineering, design, marketing and business management.

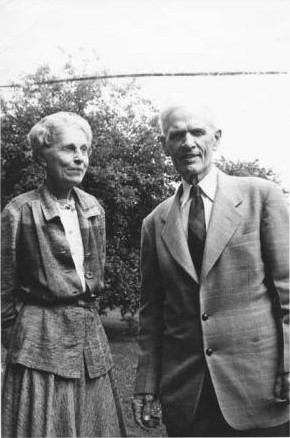
Photograph of David Carroll Churchill and his wife, Eleanor Franzen Churchill, 1953

== Work in India ==
D.C., a native of Oberlin, Ohio, studied engineering at Massachusetts Institute of Technology and graduated at the top of his class before going to India as a missionary. There, he worked as an industrial engineer with the Marathi Mission, which was affiliated with the Congregational Church.

Eleanor, the daughter of a Lutheran minister, was a native of Connecticut and a Wellesley College graduate. She was teaching in India at the Clarke-Abbott School and Home for Indian Boys when she and D.C. met. In 1914, two years after D.C.'s first wife died, she and D.C. married. In the early part of the 20th century, handweaving was the second-largest industry in India, but individual weavers found it difficult to compete with mechanized textile companies. D.C. studied the home weaving industry and developed a new type of fly-shuttle loom that allowed weavers to produce twice as much cloth as they could produce using their old looms. By 1911, his subsequent modifications allowed 36 people to do the work that it previously had taken 200 to accomplish and allowed them to compete in the mechanized marketplace. The British government in India twice gave D.C. a grant to study hand-weaving methods worldwide while en route to and from the United States. The first time was when he returned home for a one-year furlough in 1910; the second time was in 1917 when he and Eleanor decided that it was impractical to stay in India because of World War I. While the British government expected D.C. to return and use what he had learned in India, circumstances prevented that and the family remained in the United States.

== Start of Churchill Weavers ==
When they returned to the United States in 1917, the Churchills settled in Oberlin, Ohio. D.C. worked at Garford Manufacturing Co. and aided the war effort by developing the first practical retractable airplane landing gear for the U.S. Army — one of several inventions he had that were not associated with weaving. The family moved to Berea, Kentucky, in 1920 when D.C.'s longtime friend William J. Hutchins, president of Berea College, invited him to teach physics there. At the same time, D.C. planned to develop his own business designing and selling looms for handweavers. The arrangement with Berea College lasted only two years. In 1922, D.C. left the college — in part because it would not fund an engineering department — and also because policy changes would not allow him to work part-time on his own business. The Churchills decided to stay in Berea and start their own company to produce handwoven goods.

D.C. brought to the company his engineering and business skills. He evaluated the production process for efficiency, made fly-shuttle looms and worked to perfect new devices to minimize the physical strain on workers while maximizing output throughout the business. Eleanor brought firsthand weaving experience, a designer's eye, marketing and business management skills.

=== Innovation ===
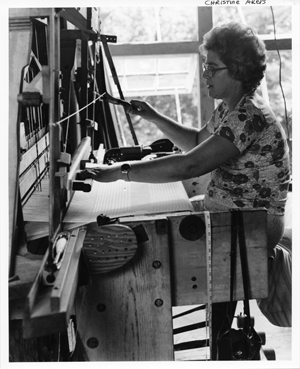
Christine Akers weaving at a handloom at Churchill Weavers, 1977

From the beginning, "most aspects of Churchill Weavers … set them apart from the rest of the mountain weaving ventures…." Unlike other mountain weaving enterprises Churchill Weavers employed both women and men and by the late 1940s provided jobs to as many as 150 people. Women tended to dominate other handweaving operations. D.C.'s efficiency analysis led Churchill Weavers to organize its process so that workers came into a central location with departmentalized tasks; in other mountain areas, one weaver carried out all aspects of making the item and worked alone in her home.

Churchill Weavers made an array of items, from baby blankets and couch throws — its signature pieces — to clothing. Other mountain weavers generally produced only placemats and finger towels. Under Eleanor's marketing direction, Churchill Weavers made for itself a national and urban market in such places as New York, Chicago, Detroit and Los Angeles before there was a market in those areas for hand-woven goods. Eleanor used such techniques as in-store demonstrations and professional models in the company catalogs.

=== Products ===
Besides clothing, throws and baby blankets, Churchill Weavers also created special-use fabric on commission. Among those commissions:

B.F. Goodrich commissioned Churchill Weavers to produce fabric for space flight in 1960. The company made 50 yards of anti-thermal fabric to be considered for use in coveralls for Mercury Mission astronauts to wear over a pressurized high altitude suit. For nearly a decade in the 1970s and 1980s, internationally known fiber artist Gerhardt Knodel commissioned Churchill Weavers to produce fabric for several textile installations, including "Free Fall" at Detroit's Renaissance Center; "Sky Ribbon: An Oklahoma Tribute" (1978) at the Alfred P. Murrah Federal Building, Oklahoma City (destroyed in 1995 by a bomb blast) and "Grand Exchange" (1981) at Cincinnati Bell.

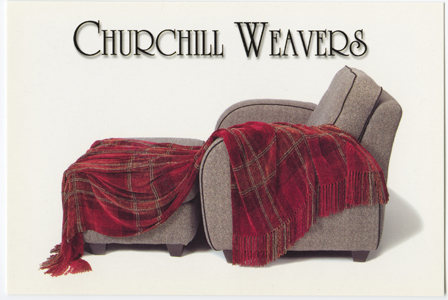
Advertisement showing a red Churchill Weavers throw draped over a chair and ottoman, ca. 1995

Churchill Weavers operated under the Churchill family for more than half a century. In 1973, Eleanor, then a widow of four years, asked Lila and Richard Bellando to take over its operation. Richard was the sole employee for the Kentucky Guild of Artists and Craftsmen and organized its fair. Lila was an educator who had studied art at Berea College. The Bellandos operated Churchill Weavers as a family business until 1996 when they sold the company to Crown Craft in Georgia. Their reasons for selling were "to bring additional resources for production, corporate expertise in business matters, and better benefits for employees." Lila continued to manage the business for another 11 years.

Churchill Weavers continues to produce its distinctive handwoven items and has done so since its sale to an Indiana entity in 2007. It never ceased production.

== Historic recognition ==
In 2007, the Kentucky Historical Society acquired the Churchill Weavers' archive with funding from the KHS Foundation and donor Joan Cralle Day, a Kentucky philanthropist and activist. The collection is a nearly complete representation of every Churchill Weavers product and weave pattern, with a fabric archive that contains more than 30,000 textiles. The collection also contains warping cards, design books and construction notes dating to the 1920s; sales brochures and catalogs; business records and correspondence; original photographs; vintage advertising signs; two antique looms that D.C. designed and built; scrapbooks containing the company's history; and other items.

In January 2014, the Churchill Weavers building in Berea was listed on the National Register of Historic Places, qualifying both because of its significant place in the local Arts and Crafts movement and because of its connection to David Carroll Churchill.

== Sources ==
- Alvic, Philis. Weavers of the Southern Highlands. University Press of Kentucky. 2003.
- Alvic, Philis. "Churchill Weavers 80 Years of American Handweaving" (2003). Textile Society of America Symposium Proceedings. Paper 428. digitalcommons.unl.edu/tsaconf/428
- Chamberlain, Ernest Barrett. The Churchills of Oberlin. Oberlin, OH: The Ohio *Historical and Improvement Organization, 1965.
- Churchill Chronicle. 10 October 1997.
- Kentucky Historical Society. "The Kentucky Historical Society presents a Preservation Exhibition Magic in the Weaving, the Churchill Weavers Collection *Revealed," an insert of "The Chronicle," Spring/Summer 2008.
