= Bybee (surname) =

Bybee is a surname. Notable people with the surname include:

- Ariel Bybee (born 1943), American mezzo-soprano with a distinguished career as a soloist, voice teacher and university opera director
- Jay Bybee (born 1953), federal judge on the United States Court of Appeals
- Joan Bybee (born 1945), American linguist
