= Bybee, Kentucky =

Unincorporated community in Kentucky, United States

- Unincorporated community
- Location within Kentucky Location within the United States
- Coordinates: 37°43′59″N 84°7′29″W
- Country: United States
- State: Kentucky
- County: Madison
- Elevation: 909 ft (277 m)
- Time zone: UTC-5 (Eastern (EST))
  - Summer (DST): UTC-4 (EDT)
- GNIS feature ID: 488554

Bybee is an unincorporated community in Madison County, Kentucky, United States. It was named Bybeetown in 1859, Its post office was established in July 1902, and it closed in 1977. It is on Kentucky Route 52 east of Waco.

The town was named after the Bybee family.
