= Fort Boonesborough State Park =

State park in Kentucky, United States

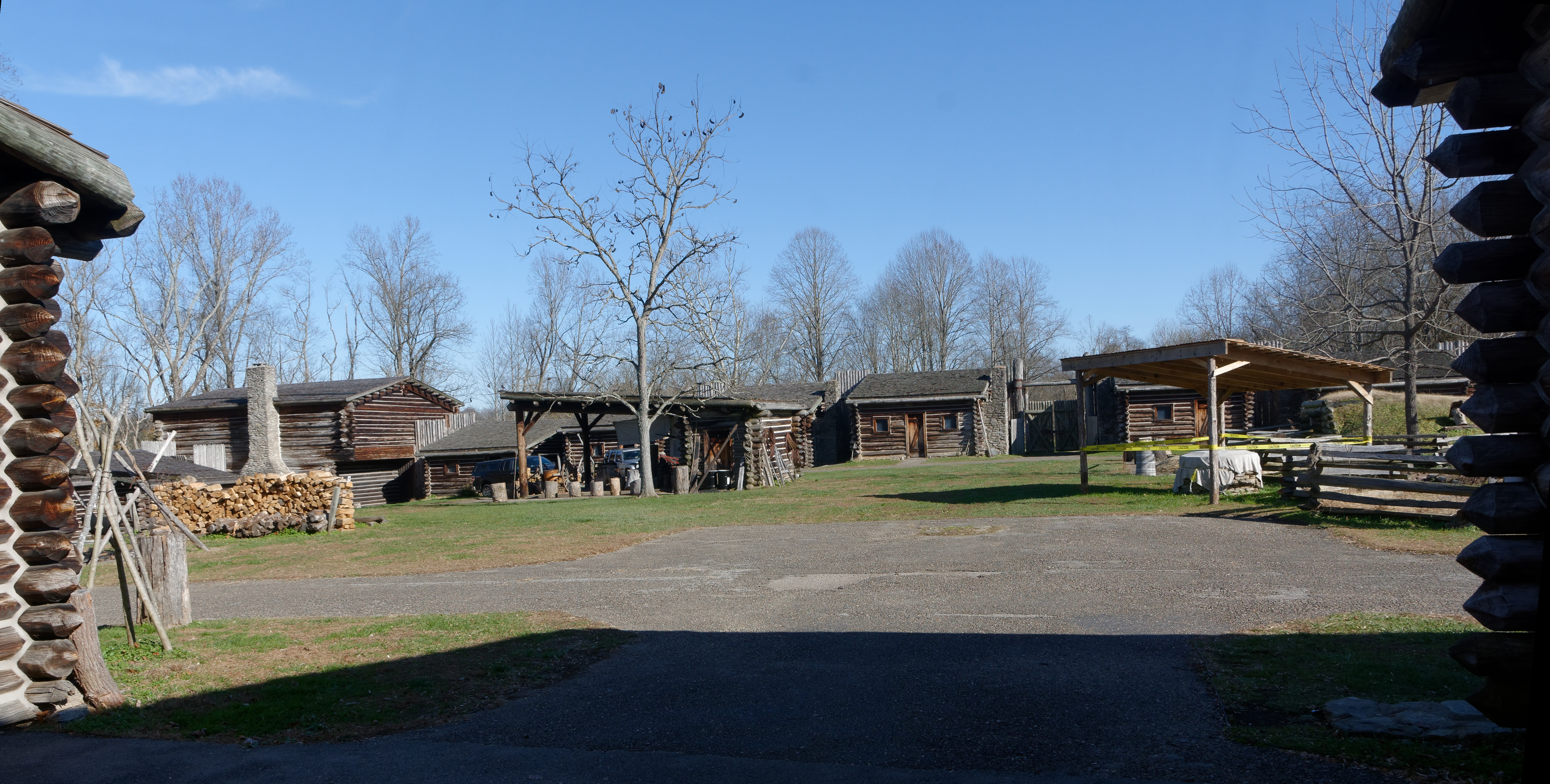
- The park's reproduction of Fort Boonesborough

- Location within Kentucky Location within the United States
- Type: Kentucky state park
- Location: Madison County, Kentucky, United States
- Coordinates: 37°54′2″N 84°16′6″W
- Area: 153 acres (62 ha)
- Established: June 14, 1963
- Administrator: Kentucky Department of Parks
- Website: Official website
- Fort Boonesborough Townsite Historic District
- U.S. National Register of Historic Places
- U.S. National Historic Landmark
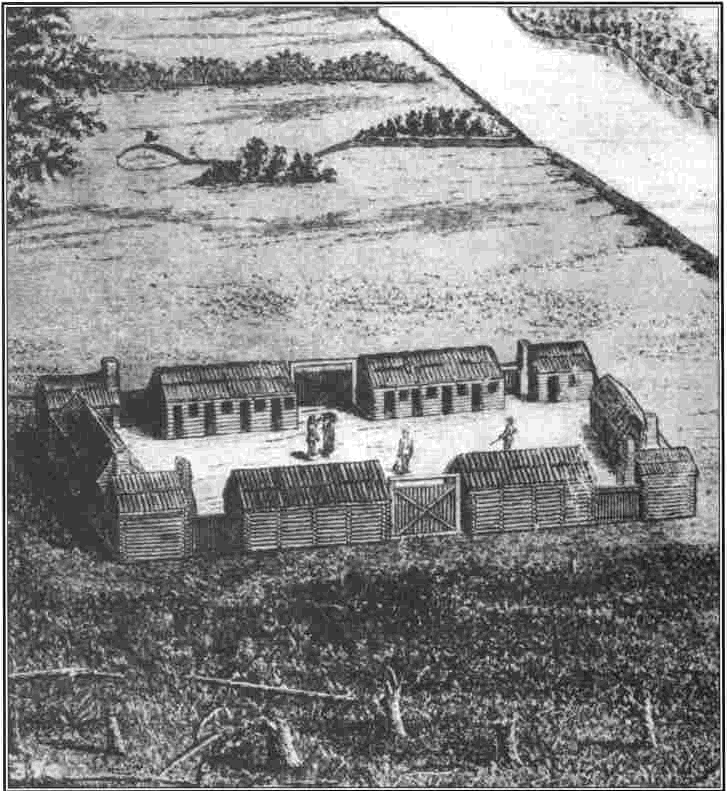
- Fort Boonesborough
- Nearest city: Richmond, Kentucky / Winchester, Kentucky
- Area: 352 acres (142 ha) (NR-listed area); 1.8 acres (0.73 ha) (NHL area)
- Built: 1775
- Architect: Richard Henderson; Daniel Boone
- NRHP reference No.: 94000303

Significant dates
- Added to NRHP: April 14, 1994
- Designated NHL: June 19, 1996

Fort Boonesborough was a frontier fort in Kentucky, founded by Daniel Boone and his men following their crossing of the Kentucky River on April 1, 1775. The settlement they founded, known as Boonesborough, Kentucky, is Kentucky's second oldest European-American settlement. It served as a major frontier outpost during the American Revolutionary War, and survived into the early 19th century before its eventual abandonment. A National Historic Landmark now administered as part of Fort Boonesborough State Park, the site is one of the best-preserved archaeological sites of early westward expansion by British colonists in that period. It is located in Madison County, Kentucky off Kentucky Route 627.

== Description ==
Fort Boonesborough State Park is located southeast of Lexington, Kentucky, on the west bank of the Kentucky River in rural Madison County. It has a reproduction of Fort Boonesborough, rebuilt as a working fort, containing cabins, bunkhouses and furnishings. The park offers history programs in conjunction with the Fort Boonesborough Foundation, During the in-season, the fort houses resident artisans such as blacksmiths and potters who do open demonstrations to give visitors a taste of what pioneer life in Kentucky was like.

The Kentucky River Museum is located in the park, at the former lock operator's home. The museum focuses on the impact of the river on area families and commerce and tells about the locks and dams in the 1900s.

== History ==
The Fort Boonesborough area was occupied by Native Americans prior to the arrival of European explorers and colonial settlers, with a small village of Fort Ancient residents known to have lived there c. 1400 AD. The area that is now Kentucky had been scouted by Daniel Boone as early as 1769, and became the subject of an illegal colonial settlement attempt orchestrated by Richard Henderson and his Transylvania Company. Boone was hired by Henderson to cut a road into the territory, which he did, arriving with his expedition near this site at the beginning of April 1775. Henderson followed later in the month, and oversaw the establishment of Boonesborough and construction of its fortifications.

The first form of representative government in Kentucky was held here in May 1775. By that summer, Boonesborough consisted of 26 one-story log cabins and four blockhouses.

The fort was the scene of much action during the western theater of the American Revolutionary War. In September 1778, the fort withstood an attack by American Indians in what would later be called "The Great Siege."

After the war, the settlement became a travel stop for westward-bound settlers, and also became involved as a transit point for the flourishing tobacco trade. By 1820, it had ceased to be of significant importance, and it was eventually abandoned. The area did not undergo intensive archaeological investigation until the 1980s, when major elements of the site were identified, including Daniel Boone's initial station, the Fort Boonesborough fortification, several water springs, the foundational remains of tobacco warehouses, and the Fort Ancient village site.

Most of the park was listed on the National Register of Historic Places as a historic district of archaeological importance in 1994. The site of Fort Boonesborough was designated a National Historic Landmark in 1996.

== See also ==
- National Historic Landmarks in Kentucky
- National Register of Historic Places listings in Madison County, Kentucky
