= Madison County, Kentucky =

County in Kentucky, United States

- County
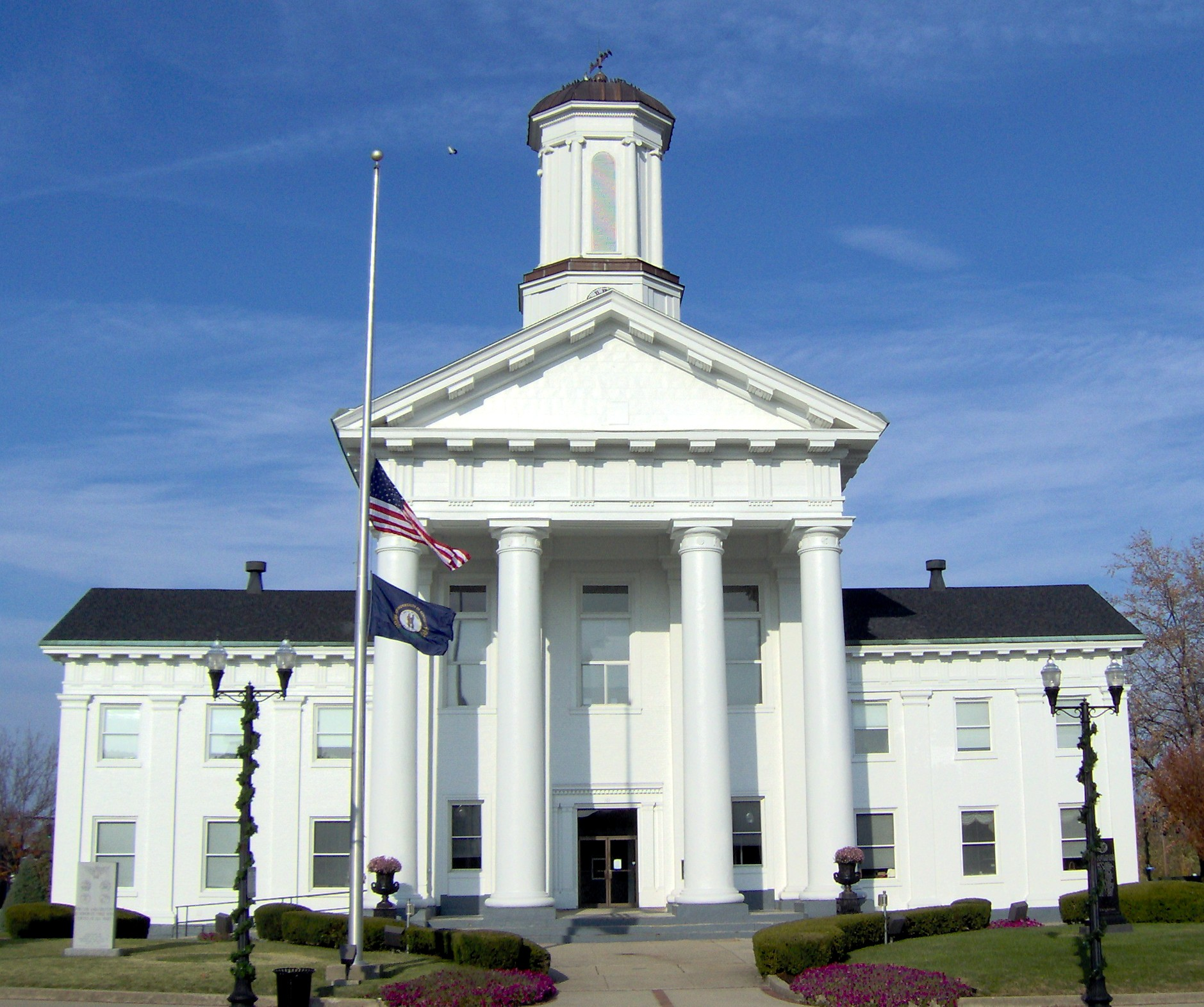
- Madison County Courthouse in Richmond

- Location within the U.S. state of Kentucky
- Coordinates: 37°43′N 84°17′W
- Country: United States
- State: Kentucky
- Founded: December 15, 1785
- Named for: James Madison
- Seat: Richmond
- Largest city: Richmond

Government
  - Judge/Executive: Reagan Taylor (R)

Area
  - Total: 443 sq mi (1,150 km^{2})
  - Land: 437 sq mi (1,130 km^{2})
  - Water: 6.0 sq mi (16 km^{2}) 1.3%

Population (2020)
  - Total: 92,701
  - Estimate (2025): 101,698 ▲
  - Density: 212/sq mi (81.9/km^{2})
- Time zone: UTC−5 (Eastern)
  - Summer (DST): UTC−4 (EDT)
- Congressional district: 6th
- Website: madisoncountyky.gov

Madison County is a county located in the central part of the U.S. state of Kentucky. At the 2020 census, its population was 92,701. Its county seat is Richmond. The county is named for Virginia statesman James Madison, who later became the fourth President of the United States.

The county is part of the Richmond-Berea, KY Micropolitan Statistical Area which is also included in the Lexington-Fayette–Richmond–Frankfort, KY combined statistical area.

Madison County was considered a moist county, meaning that although the county prohibited the sale of alcoholic beverages (and is thus a dry county), it contained a city where retail alcohol sales are allowed. Nevertheless, two of the county's 19 precincts are completely dry. Alcohol can also be sold by the drink in Berea, Richmond, and at Arlington and The Bull golf clubs. In 2023, the county voted to become wet.

Madison County is home to Eastern Kentucky University, Berea College, and historic Boone Tavern. Famous pioneer Daniel Boone lived in Madison County and built Fort Boonesborough, now a state historic site.

== History ==
Indian trader John Findley, Daniel Boone, and four others first came into the area that is now Madison County in 1769 on a hunting and exploring expedition. In 1774, the Transylvania Company, led by Judge Richard Henderson of North Carolina, purchased 20,000,000 acres (8,100,000 ha) of land west of the Appalachians (including present-day Madison County) from the Cherokee Nation. Daniel Boone was hired to cut a trail through the Cumberland Gap and establish a settlement on the Kentucky River. The settlement at Fort Boonesborough began in April 1775.

In 1785, Madison County was established from a portion of Lincoln County, Virginia.

== Geography ==
According to the United States Census Bureau, the county has a total area of 443 square miles (1,150 km^{2}), of which 437 square miles (1,130 km^{2}) is land and 6.0 square miles (16 km^{2}) (1.3%) is water.

=== Major highways ===
- Interstate 75
- U.S. 25
- U.S. 421
- KY 52

=== Adjacent counties ===
- Fayette County (north)
- Clark County (northeast)
- Estill County (east)
- Jackson County (southeast)
- Rockcastle County (south)
- Garrard County (southwest)
- Jessamine County (northwest)

== Demographics ==
Historical population
Census	Pop.	Note	%±
1790	5,772		—
1800	10,490		81.7%
1810	15,540		48.1%
1820	15,954		2.7%
1830	18,751		17.5%
1840	16,355		−12.8%
1850	15,727		−3.8%
1860	17,207		9.4%
1870	19,543		13.6%
1880	22,052		12.8%
1890	24,348		10.4%
1900	25,607		5.2%
1910	26,951		5.2%
1920	26,284		−2.5%
1930	27,621		5.1%
1940	28,541		3.3%
1950	31,179		9.2%
1960	33,482		7.4%
1970	42,730		27.6%
1980	53,352		24.9%
1990	57,508		7.8%
2000	70,872		23.2%
2010	82,916		17.0%
2020	92,701		11.8%
2025 (est.)	101,698	▲	9.7%
U.S. Decennial Census; 1790-1960 1900-1990; 1990-2000 2010-2020

=== 2020 census ===
As of the 2020 census, the county had a population of 92,701. The median age was 35.6 years. 20.9% of residents were under the age of 18 and 14.9% of residents were 65 years of age or older. For every 100 females there were 93.9 males, and for every 100 females age 18 and over there were 91.5 males age 18 and over.

The racial makeup of the county was 86.9% White, 4.3% Black or African American, 0.3% American Indian and Alaska Native, 1.1% Asian, 0.1% Native Hawaiian and Pacific Islander, 1.3% from some other race, and 6.1% from two or more races. Hispanic or Latino residents of any race comprised 3.3% of the population.

63.8% of residents lived in urban areas, while 36.2% lived in rural areas.

There were 36,148 households in the county, of which 29.6% had children under the age of 18 living with them and 26.3% had a female householder with no spouse or partner present. About 28.1% of all households were made up of individuals and 9.7% had someone living alone who was 65 years of age or older.

There were 39,319 housing units, of which 8.1% were vacant. Among occupied housing units, 59.5% were owner-occupied and 40.5% were renter-occupied. The homeowner vacancy rate was 1.6% and the rental vacancy rate was 9.0%.

=== 2000 census ===
As of the census of 2000, there were 70,872 people, 27,152 households, and 18,218 families residing in the county. The population density was 161 per square mile (62/km^{2}). There were 29,595 housing units at an average density of 67 per square mile (26/km^{2}). The racial makeup of the county was 93.01% White, 4.44% Black or African American, 0.28% Native American, 0.72% Asian, 0.02% Pacific Islander, 0.34% from other races, and 1.19% from two or more races. 0.97% of the population were Hispanics or Latinos of any race.

There were 27,152 households, out of which 31.50% had children under the age of 18 living with them, 53.10% were married couples living together, 10.70% had a female householder with no husband present, and 32.90% were non-families. 25.20% of all households were made up of individuals, and 7.60% had someone living alone who was 65 years of age or older. The average household size was 2.42 and the average family size was 2.90.

By age, 21.90% were under 18, 18.80% from 18 to 24, 29.40% from 25 to 44, 20.10% from 45 to 64, and 9.80% 65 or older. The median age was 31 years. Both the relatively large 18-to-24 population and the relatively low median age can be explained by the presence of Eastern Kentucky University, and to a considerably lesser extent Berea College. For every 100 females, there were 93.30 males. For every 100 females age 18 and over, there were 90.20 males.

The median income for a household in the county was $32,861, and the median income for a family was $41,383. Males had a median income of $31,974 versus $22,487 for females. The per capita income for the county was $16,790. About 12.00% of families and 16.80% of the population were below the poverty line, including 17.80% of those under age 18 and 17.10% of those age 65 or over.

== Economy ==
=== Military ===
The Blue Grass Army Depot (BGAD) is located just south of Richmond.

In February 2026, U.S. Senator Mitch McConnell announced a nearly $1 billion in federal funding for BGAD as part of the FY 2026 Defense Appropriations bill. Energetics Manufacturing received $903 million to expand manufacturing capacity for energetics materials, (explosives materials). Plus an additional $64+ million towards other BGAD improvements.

=== Civilian ===
Hitachi Astemo Americas Inc., has been making major automotive investments in Berea, since 2023.

== Politics ==
United States presidential election results for Madison County, Kentucky
Year	Republican		Democratic		Third party(ies)	
Year	No.	%	No.	%	No.	%
1912	2,094	34.67%	2,992	49.54%	953	15.78%
1916	3,017	47.56%	3,295	51.94%	32	0.50%
1920	6,012	51.21%	5,647	48.10%	80	0.68%
1924	5,276	51.26%	4,895	47.56%	121	1.18%
1928	6,325	57.03%	4,736	42.71%	29	0.26%
1932	5,811	45.10%	6,957	54.00%	116	0.90%
1936	6,034	48.76%	6,259	50.58%	82	0.66%
1940	5,789	46.91%	6,484	52.54%	67	0.54%
1944	5,468	48.36%	5,769	51.02%	70	0.62%
1948	4,619	45.48%	5,344	52.62%	193	1.90%
1952	5,886	49.82%	5,901	49.94%	28	0.24%
1956	5,955	50.85%	5,670	48.42%	85	0.73%
1960	6,692	54.35%	5,621	45.65%	0	0.00%
1964	4,266	38.09%	6,877	61.40%	57	0.51%
1968	5,325	44.83%	3,884	32.70%	2,669	22.47%
1972	8,659	65.60%	4,328	32.79%	212	1.61%
1976	6,581	46.63%	7,299	51.71%	234	1.66%
1980	8,437	47.74%	8,208	46.45%	1,026	5.81%
1984	11,309	63.09%	6,509	36.31%	108	0.60%
1988	9,958	59.39%	6,672	39.79%	136	0.81%
1992	8,719	43.94%	8,005	40.35%	3,117	15.71%
1996	9,212	48.23%	8,142	42.62%	1,748	9.15%
2000	13,682	57.81%	9,309	39.33%	675	2.85%
2004	18,922	61.62%	11,525	37.53%	260	0.85%
2008	19,694	60.53%	12,392	38.09%	451	1.39%
2012	21,128	63.41%	11,512	34.55%	682	2.05%
2016	23,431	62.70%	11,793	31.56%	2,147	5.75%
2020	27,356	62.23%	15,581	35.45%	1,020	2.32%
2024	29,130	64.26%	15,180	33.49%	1,019	2.25%

The county voted "No" on 2022 Kentucky Amendment 2, an anti-abortion ballot measure, by 52% to 48%, and backed Donald Trump with 62% of the vote to Joe Biden's 35% in the 2020 presidential election.

=== Local government ===
The Madison County courthouse is located at 135 W Irvine Street in Richmond.

   County Judge-Executive: Reagan Taylor
   County Clerk: Kenny Barger
   Sheriff: Mike Coyle
   Coroner: Jimmy Cornelison
   Jailer: Steve Tussey
   County Attorney: Jennie Haymond
   Circuit Clerk: David M. Fernandez
   County Property Valuation Administrator (PVA): Billy Ackerman
   County Surveyor: Stuart W. Spencer

=== Elected officials ===
Elected officials as of January 3, 2025
U.S. House	Andy Barr (R)	KY 6
Ky. Senate	Jared Carpenter (R)	34
Ky. House	Josh Bray (R)	71
Ky. House	Deanna Gordon (R)	81
Ky. House	Timmy Truett (R)	89
Ky. House	Bill Wesley (R)	91

== Education ==
=== Schools ===
Madison County is served by two school districts:

- Madison County Schools, currently consisting of 11 elementary, 5 middle, 2 high schools, and 2 Ignite Academies.
- Berea Independent Schools, currently consisting of 1 elementary, 1 middle, and 1 high school.

The county is also served by Model Laboratory Schools which is part of Eastern Kentucky University.

=== Colleges and universities ===
- Eastern Kentucky University, located in Richmond
- Berea College, located in Berea
- National College of Business & Technology, located in Richmond

== Communities ==
=== Cities ===
- Berea
- Richmond (county seat)

=== Unincorporated communities ===
- Baldwin
- Bighill
- Bobtown
- Boonesborough
- Buggytown
- Bybee
- College Hill
- Dreyfus
- Kingston
- Kirksville
- Million
- Moberly
- Newby
- Redhouse
- Round Hill
- Ruthton
- Speedwell
- Union City, Kentucky, where vaudevillian Andrew Tribble was born A historical marker commemorates his life at Union City Park.
- Valley View
- Waco

== Notable people ==
- Frances Estill Beauchamp (1860–1923), temperance activist, social reformer, lecturer
- Daniel S. Bentley (1850–1916), American minister, writer, newspaper founder
- Daniel Boone - American frontiersman and explorer of Kentucky.
- Kit Carson - Christopher Houston Carson (December 24, 1809 – May 23, 1868), better known as Kit Carson, was an American frontiersman.
- Mary Kavanaugh Eagle (1854–1903), American activist, clubwoman, book editor.
- Lonnie Napier (1940–2023) – former representative for House District 36 in the Kentucky House of Representatives.

== Sister communities ==
- Hokuto City, Yamanashi, Japan (since 1990)

== See also ==
- National Register of Historic Places listings in Madison County, Kentucky
