= Exit numbers in the United States =

Conventions on assigning numbers to highway exits in the United States

Exit Numbers in the United States by State as of August 2021

Exit numbers in the United States are assigned to freeway junctions, and are usually numbered as exits from freeways. Exit numbers generally are found above the destinations and route number(s) at the exit, as well as a sign in the gore. Exit numbers typically reset at political borders such as state lines. Some major streets also use exit numbers. Freeway exits in the United States are usually numbered in two formats: distance-based and sequential.

== Interstate Highways ==
An example of a green exit number plaque for two exits at the same interchange

An example of a green exit number plaque for a left exit with a yellow "left" panel

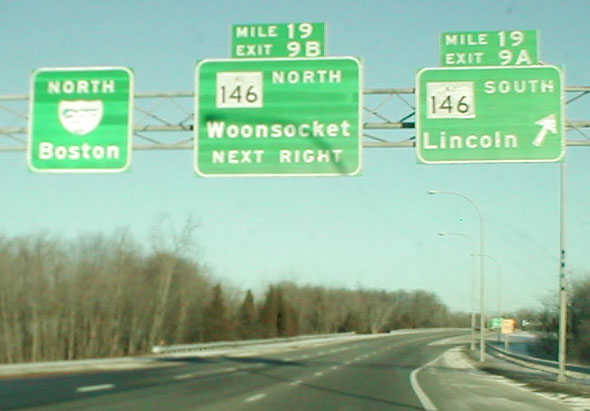
Old mile tabs on I-295 in Rhode Island, several other states did this. As of September 2007, these signs have been replaced and use only the sequential exit number scheme. Exit numbers on I-295 have since been converted to mile-based numbers as of 2017.

The Federal Highway Administration (FHWA) generally requires exit numbers (mile-based or sequential) on the Interstate Highway System; the FHWA established that requirement in 1970. The Manual on Uniform Traffic Control Devices (MUTCD) encouraged use of mileposts and exit numbering by 1961. The MUTCD mandated exit numbering in 1971. The FHWA granted California an exception due to the cost of installing and maintaining additional signage; the state was able to obtain a waiver because it had already built most of its freeways, although some freeways in Los Angeles County received junction numbers: Interstate 10 (I-10) was the only freeway in the county that had a complete set of junction numbers. I-5, US Route 101 (US 101), and then State Route 11 (now I-110/SR 110) were numbered for short distances from downtown Los Angeles. Freeway connections were unnumbered, and junction numbers were only shown on plates, not on gore signs. In 2002, the Cal-NExUS program began to completely number California's junctions. The program is not well-funded, especially because of California's budget woes, so exits are only being signed with numbers when signs need to be replaced. As the efficiency of an exit numbering system for navigational purposes depends on all exits being consistently numbered, the usefulness of the system while only some exits are numbered is limited. Originally, the initial completion date for this project was set as November 2004. The deadline was then extended to 2008. However, the 2006 edition of the California Manual on Uniform Traffic Control Devices removed any sort of compliance deadline for the exit numbers.

As of June 2008, nine states—mostly in the Northeast—and the District of Columbia used sequential numbering schemes on at least one highway, although the 2009 edition of the MUTCD requires these jurisdictions to transition to distance-based numbering. Although a ten-year compliance period was proposed for the new edition of the MUTCD, a compliance date for this change was ultimately not adopted with the 2009 edition, meaning that the transition is accomplished through a systematic upgrading of existing signing and there is no specific date by which the change must be implemented. However, the FHWA has required that all federally funded routes with sequential numbering eventually be converted to mileage-based exit numbers. To that end, the FHWA has required each state that currently uses sequential exit numbering to submit a plan to eventually transition to distance-based exit numbers. Some of the states that currently have sequential numbering either have or intend to request a waiver from the Federal Highway Administration to retain their current numbering systems, while others have planned a gradual transition to mileage-based exit numbering over time as existing signage reaches the end of its serviceable life and is replaced.

The mile-based requirement mandates multiple exits in the same mile to use a letter suffix in alphabetical order. This also applies to divided interchanges, where two exits are used for opposite directions of the road, for example on full cloverleaf interchanges. Older exit numbering schemes sometimes use cardinal directions (E, S, N, W, often E-W or S-N) depending on the directionality of the cross route(s), for example I-93 in New Hampshire uses exits 15E and 15W for the cloverleaf interchange with US 202 in Concord which is signed east and west at the interchange. Many exits in the Northeastern states which currently or formerly used sequential numbering schemes had these directional abbreviations, but most have converted to A-B schemes. (As of 2019, New Hampshire is the only state to have never used distance-based exits, including experimental dual exit/mile numbers/letters.)

The New Jersey Turnpike mainline splits into an Eastern Spur and Western Spur between interchanges 15 and 18. Because of this, E and W suffixes are present on these spurs (15E-16E-18E and 15W-16W-18W) to differentiate the interchange and roadway. One interchange on the Eastern Spur was constructed at a later time between 15E and 16E, creating an exit 15X. The letter X was used to represent access to the Secaucus Junction rail station (in the planning stages as Secaucus Transfer, or Xfer), and to avoid an Interchange 15EA designation.

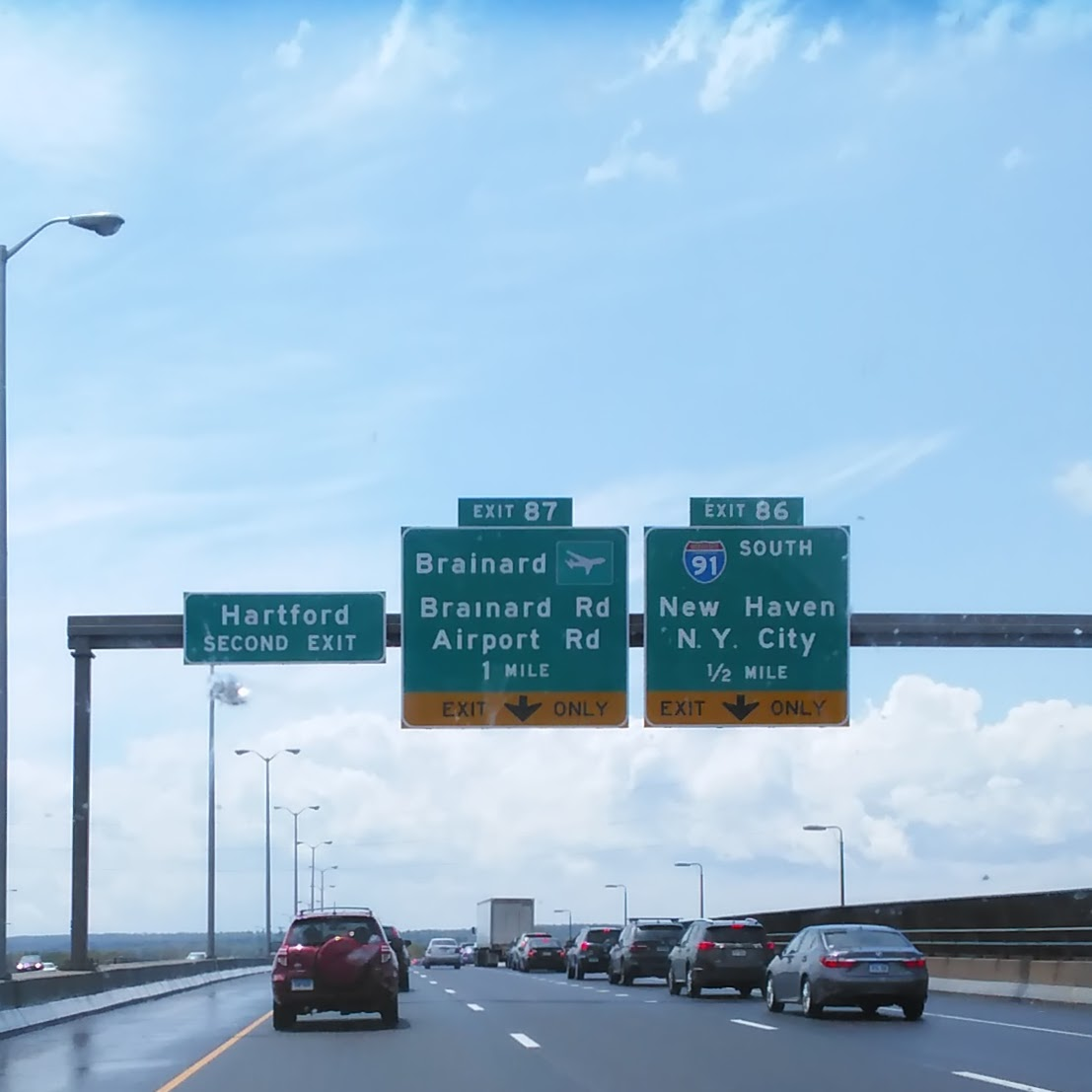
An example of sequentially-numbered exits in Connecticut on the Charter Oak Bridge, Route 15/US 5; the state has begun the federally mandated conversion to mile-based exits.

Several states still maintain systems other than the MUTCD-standard mileage based systems; among these are:

- Alaska: Exits on freeway portions of Alaska's Interstate Highways are currently unnumbered.
- Connecticut: I-84, I-91, and I-95 are currently sequential within the state. The state currently plans to convert all interstate highways in the state to mile-based exit numbers by 2029. Connecticut planned to convert I-91 to mileage-based exit numbering in 1974, however, ConnDOT abandoned that initiative due to objections from local businesses.
- Delaware: Exit numbers are sequential on I-95 and I-495. I-295 has no exit numbers at all, however, DelDOT has made a reference on a 2016 construction notice referring to the exit to I-495 north as exit 2.
- District of Columbia: Historically, the only exit numbers posted in the District consisted of sequential numbers on I-295. The other freeways within the District of Columbia did not have exit numbers, but in 2008 the District began posting sequential numbers on I-395. As of June 2008, not all interchanges had received numbers. The close proximity of the interchanges on this short freeway, coupled with the lack of space for new interchanges, renders the sequential system more practical than the mileage-based.
- Florida: Interstate 110 uses sequential exit numbering.
- Kentucky and Indiana: While both states use the mile-log system for their Interstate highways, the ongoing renumbering of exits on Interstate 265 around Louisville, set for completion in fall 2026, will deviate from MUTCD standards in one respect. Numbering will start at the intersection of I-265 and I-65 in Kentucky and run continuously to the road's northern terminus at I-64 in Indiana, not resetting at the state line.
- Maine: The first nine exits on I-295 through Portland and South Portland, as well as I-395 thru Bangor and Brewer are sequentially numbered.
- Massachusetts: Mileage based. I-291 and I-391 near Springfield, along with the Lowell Connector in Lowell, and Route 213 in Methuen are sequentially numbered. However, those roadways are short and have exits that are generally spaced in one-mile increments, closely matching the existing mile markers. The Lowell Connector does not have any mile markers currently posted along the roadway.
- Mississippi: Exits on I-69 are unnumbered.
- New Hampshire: All sequential. New Hampshire DOT has reportedly received permission to use federal funding to convert to mileage-based, but has yet to announce a formal plan for conversion. The New Hampshire General Court has considered legislation authorizing and directing the conversion to mile-based exit numbers, but former Governor Chris Sununu repeatedly stated his opposition to eliminating New Hampshire's existing sequential exit numbering system.
- New Jersey: Mileage-based with the exception of I-676, I-278, and the New Jersey Turnpike (part of which is concurrent with I-95), which are sequential.
- New York: Mostly sequential; exceptions include I-781 (Fort Drum spur), I-890 in Schenectady, I-99, and I-84. I-95 mostly uses sequential numbering, however, exit numbers in The Bronx south of the New England Thruway are mile-based. I-81 uses mile-based numbering. The mainline of the New York State Thruway utilizes a separate exit-numbering scheme separate from its Interstates; non-Thruway sections of I-87 and I-90 each use three independent (currently sequential) exit-numbering schemes.
- Pennsylvania: Interstates are numbered by milepost with the exception of I-579 and I-676; both are short urban freeways with no exit numbers at all.
- Rhode Island: Rhode Island experimented with dual exit/mile tabs in the 1970s. The state was denied a waiver from the FHWA to retain its sequential numbering system. The state completed renumbering all exit numbers from sequential to mile-based on November 3, 2022, with I-95 being the last interstate to do so.
- Texas: Exits on completed sections of I-69W, I-169, and I-369 are currently unnumbered.
- Vermont: Sequential, with no plans as of late 2018 to change to mile-based. Governor Phil Scott reached an agreement with the FHWA to use a dual sequential/mile-based exit numbering system starting in 2020. Under the agreement, existing sequential numbers will be retained, and supplemental signs added to each exit sign assembly indicating the mile-based exit number.

Two highways (I-19 in Arizona and Delaware Route 1 [DE 1]) have metric numbering, because they were constructed during the time when the US was thought to be completely converting to metric. DE 1 has used standard mileposts since 2003 when the metric-based posts were replaced, and several exit numbers (79, 83, 86, 88, 119) do not coincide with either the milemarker nor its kilometer conversion as they are offset by miles from a kilometer-based exit. I-19 currently has all exit numbers and distances in kilometers, but speed limits in miles per hour. The road has received funding for the distances to be changed back to miles, but in response to local opposition against exit number changes, the Arizona Department of Transportation had decided to spend the money on other roads instead.

== Other highways ==
Exit numbering on non-Interstate highways is less consistent. For example, Texas, which normally uses mile-based exit numbering, uses sequential numbering on US 75 between downtown Dallas and the Oklahoma border. Similarly, the US 54 freeway from El Paso to the New Mexico state line also uses sequential exit numbering.

- Alaska: the Johansen Expressway has three interchanges with sequential exit numbers.
- In Arizona, many of its non-Interstate freeways utilize exit numbers such as the freeway loops (SR 101 and SR 202) around Phoenix, US 60 and SR 51.
- In Arkansas, US 67 (Future I-57), Arkansas Highway 549 (AR 549), and US 70 on the Hot Springs bypass are the only non-Interstate freeways to have exit numbers. Currently, I-49 from I-40 in Alma to Bentonville in northwest Arkansas follows the old numbering system off its old designation I-540. The exit numbers and mileage are derived from their distance from where the Fort Smith section of I-540 begins at the Oklahoma state line.
- California uses exit numbers on most of its non-Interstate highways statewide when they are built to freeway standards. The notable exceptions are the Ojai Freeway section of SR 33 in and near Ventura, the westernmost section of SR 37 near Novato, the Westside Parkway section of SR 58 in Bakersfield, all but one of the freeway-style interchanges on SR 152 in central California (an interchange with SR 33 north near Santa Nella is numbered as exit 60), the small freeway section of SR 330 in Highland, and the freeway-style interchanges on the southern segment of US 395 in the southeastern part of California (an interchange in the northern segment of US 395 is numbered as exit 8 for SR 70, measured from the California-Nevada state line where US 395 re-enters California near Cold Springs, Nevada). However, like its Interstate Highways, the state's budget concerns have caused exits on these routes to only be signed with numbers when signs need to be replaced.
  - On the expressway section of SR 86 near Thermal, the exit for Airport Boulevard is numbered as exit 16, measured from the start of the old SR 86S (S for "supplemental") at 81st Avenue near Oasis (where SR 86 and SR 86S used to split). SR 86S was decommissioned in 2012 as SR 86 was rerouted onto the expressway alignment of former SR 86S. It is the only numbered exit on SR 86, despite the distance conflict.
  - On a very small section of freeway of SR 126 near Santa Clarita, the exit for Commerce Center Drive is sequentially numbered as exit 13, as exit 12 is 27 miles (43 km) away in Santa Paula near the eastern end of the Santa Paula Freeway section of SR 126. It is the only known instance of a sequential numbered exit in California.
- Colorado does not use exit numbers on non-Interstate highways. The exception is E-470 and the Northwest Parkway, which are separate toll highways.
- Connecticut had used sequential exit numbers on longer non-Interstate freeways, such as Route 2, Route 8, Route 11, Route 25, and US 7. Previously, shorter freeway sections, such as the US 6 Windham Bypass, Route 20 (Bradley Airport Connector), and freeway sections of Route 17 lacked exit numbers. As of August 2025, all non-Interstate freeways in Connecticut have mileage-based exit numbers, except for US 7, which still has sequentially numbered exits, and Route 20 (Bradley Airport Connector) has no exit numbers. Before its conversion to mileage-based numbering in August 2025, Route 15's exit numbers were originally a continuation of exit numbers from the Hutchinson River Parkway in New York.
- In Delaware, US 301 uses mileage-based exit numbers and DE 141 uses sequential exit numbers. DE 1 uses kilometer-based exit numbers despite using milemarkers since 2003 (and newer exits use numbers making no sense to either system, such as exit 86 in Frederica not being 86 miles or kilometers from the Maryland line).
- In Florida, the Turnpike and other expressways owned and operated by the Florida's Turnpike Enterprise use distance-number exits. Toll roads under the Central Florida Expressway Authority also use distance-number exits. The Lee Roy Selmon Expressway in Tampa uses a sequential-based exit numbering system. Expressways under the authority of the Miami-Dade Expressway Authority have no exit numbers.
- Georgia does not carry exit numbers on non-Interstate expressways except for SR 400 and Stone Mountain Freeway, which run on a sequential system, and SR 10 Loop, running on a distance-number system.
- The state of Illinois uses exit numbers on three freeways, on Illinois Route 6 (IL 6) between in Peoria, IL 390 in the northwestern suburbs of Chicago, and IL 255 in the suburbs of St. Louis.
- The state of Indiana uses exit numbers on two highways with freeway segments, on US 31 between Indianapolis and South Bend and SR 912 in northwest Indiana.
- The state of Iowa uses exit numbers on non-Interstate expressways, such as Iowa 163 or the non-Interstate portions of the Avenue of the Saints.
- Kentucky does not limit exit numbers to Interstate Highways.
  - Exits on the controlled-access portion of New Circle Road (KY 4), which surrounds the urban core of Lexington, are numbered on the standard distance-based system. Numbering increases in clockwise order, starting and finishing at the interchange with Nicholasville Road (US 27) near New Circle's southernmost point.
  - All roads within the state's parkway system of former toll roads (some of which have been converted to Interstates, with others in the process of conversion) use the same distance-based numbering system used on interstates.
    - One exception is the Plano Road (KY 622) exit of the William H. Natcher Parkway (KY 9007) outside of Bowling Green. Originally, the William Natcher Parkway connected I-65 at exit 20 to US 60 in Owensboro. In 2011, the Natcher Parkway was extended 2.1 miles (3.4 km) to terminate at Scottsville Road (US 231). This caused a renumbering of the Natcher Parkway and adding the Plano Road exit as exit 1. However, in 2019 the Natcher Parkway was upgraded to Interstate standards and redesignated as I-165. According to Interstate regulations, Interstates and Interstate spurs should not terminate at a traffic signal. This redefined the highway to once again begin at the I-65 interchange. The remaining 2.1 miles (3.4 km) of the highway remained as KY 9007. This left the question on how to number the Plano Road exit located approximately halfway along the remaining highway. To prevent confusion in directionality and numbering conventions, the Plano Road exit was renumbered with the rare exit 0 designation.
  - In addition to these instances, several smaller cities, mainly in the southeastern and south-central portions of the Commonwealth, mark traffic lights on a main commercial road with sequential numbers, usually beginning at an intersection with a primary highway:
    - Berea — KY 21, starting at the I-75 interchange until KY 21 meets US 25. Numbering continues on US 25 until the road leaves the city limits. Throughout this stretch, numbering increases as one travels north.
    - Corbin — US 25E, starting at the I-75 interchange at North Corbin and continuing for approximately five miles (8.0 km) until its intersection with KY 830 east of Corbin. Numbering increases as one travels east (which is signed as south on US 25E).
    - London has two sets of numbered lights. The Hal Rogers Parkway, starting at KY 192 (which is not numbered, as it is a flashing yellow light for parkway traffic instead of a fully controlled signal) and ending at US 25, uses increasing westbound numbering. KY 192, starting at the I-75 interchange, uses increasing eastbound numbering until the Hal Rogers Parkway.
    - Manchester — US 421, starting at the Hal Rogers Parkway and increasing as one travels north through the city.
    - Middlesboro — KY 74 through the downtown area, with numbering increasing as one travels west.
    - Monticello — KY 90, starting at the northern end of the city and increasing until exiting the city.
    - Radcliff — US 31W, also known as Dixie Highway, starting at an intersection at the city's border with Elizabethtown and increasing as one travels north until reaching the main entrance to Fort Knox.
    - Richmond also has two sets of numbered lights. US 25 Business uses exit numbers through downtown numbers lights 1–6 from KY 52 at Lancaster Avenue and the next five consecutive lights south; however, the lights south of the railroad tracks and north of the KY 52 concurrency are not numbered. The bypass route wrapping east around Richmond uses exit numbers from KY 876 (locally known as Eastern Bypass) east of I-75 exit 87, and continues onto Dr. Robert R. Martin Highway US 25/US 421 to I-75 exit 90; however, the traffic lights at the Interstate are not numbered.
    - Somerset — US 27, starting at the northern limits of the city and increasing as one travels south. The numbering continues even after the road leaves the city limits, with the final numbered intersection occurring shortly before US 27 enters the city of Burnside.
- Maine has exit numbers only on Interstates; its other limited-access highways with limited exceptions lack mile markers.
- In Maryland, there are three state highways that use exit numbers. Maryland Route 200 (MD 200) continues the distance-based exits from its parent I-370. MD 32 has a peculiar distance-based exit set up in that the exits are numbered from east to west from I-97 to MD 108 so that the eastern terminus of MD 32 starts at mile 0. MD 100 uses distance-based exits until Edwin Raynor Boulevard (exit 20).
- Minnesota distance-numbers its exits on Interstates, but left other freeways or expressways with unnumbered exits. The first exception was US 52's freeway portion through Rochester, which received mileage-based exit numbers in 2004 as part of a major widening project. In 2016, MnDOT started adding exit numbers to previously unnumbered exits during sign replacement projects or new freeway construction, starting with US 169 in Shakopee. As of January 2023, portions of MN 62, MN 610, MN 77, US 10, US 12, US 212, US 61, portions of US 52 between Rochester and downtown St. Paul, and most left exits at major junctions, have gained numbers.
- In Mississippi, exits on non-Interstate freeways are not currently numbered.
- In Missouri, non-Interstate Highways do not have exit numbers, the exceptions being Route 364 and Route 370 in St. Charles and St. Louis counties, which use mile-based exit numbers.
- In New England, except for Maine (which assigned exit numbers based on mileage), exit numbers are posted on express highways of any significant length, regardless of designation. Some at-grade intersections have posted numbers, such as on Route 9 in Middletown, Connecticut.
- New Hampshire does not assign numbers to exits to junctions with Interstates (with the exception of I-393 in Concord, in which exit 15W from I-93 connected to the US 4/US 202 interchange prior to the construction of I-393). For example, I-293's southern exit from I-93 is between exits 5 and 6, but is not numbered, NH-101 eastbound, however, despite being an interstate grade freeway, is assigned Exit 7. NH 101's own exit to I-95 in Hampton is between exits 12 and 13, but is also not numbered.
- In New Jersey, the New Jersey Turnpike and Palisades Interstate Parkway are numbered sequentially. All other highways are mile-based, except for the Brigantine Connector in Atlantic City, which uses letters for exits. Many New Jersey freeways lack exit numbers.
- New Mexico initially did not assign exit numbers on non-Interstate highways. In the mid-2000s, the state's Department of Transportation began posting mile-based exit numbers whenever an at-grade intersection is upgraded to an interchange.
  - US 84/US 285 between Pojoaque and Santa Fe became the first non-Interstate highway in the state to use exit numbers when that stretch was upgraded to freeway standards in 2005; there is also a numbered interchange (exit 180) on the expressway segment of the same highway between Pojoaque and Española. The NM 502 interchange in Pojoaque isn't numbered; and the interchange with NM 599 near Santa Fe is only numbered going southbound as they were both built in the late 1990s and early 2000s, respectively.
  - NM 599 has two (mile-based) numbered interchanges, at Jaguar Drive (exit 2) and at County Road 62 (exit 6). However, the interchanges at Camino La Tierra and Ridgetop Road are not numbered at all.
  - The US 70/US 285 Relief Route around Roswell has an interchange with two exits marked exit A and exit B.
  - Other freeways (US 70 east of Las Cruces and NM 423 in Albuquerque) have no exit numbers due to their relatively short lengths. Previously, New Mexico did not assign exit numbers on non-Interstate highways.
- In New York, most highways in the New York City metro region of this type use sequential numbering (an exception is the Belt Parkway system, which uses directional suffixes (N, S, E, W) and alphabetical suffixes). Expressways and freeways without Interstate designations upstate have unnumbered interchanges. In addition:
  - All parkways on Long Island, except the Southern State Parkway, Heckscher State Parkway, and Northern State Parkway preface exit numbers with a one- or two-letter prefix indicating the parkway's name. For example, exits on the Meadowbrook Parkway are numbered M1 through M10, and exits on the Sunken Meadow Parkway are numbered SM1 through SM5. Some of these exits have a letter suffix as well (usually N, S, E, and/or W).
  - Some at-grade intersections (level junctions) have posted numbers; former examples are the Taconic State Parkway, NY 17, and within New York City, NY 27 along only the section of Linden Boulevard east of Kings Highway. Current examples are the Bronx River Parkway, Saw Mill River Parkway, and, within New York City, NY 27 along Conduit Avenue only.
  - The Taconic State Parkway formerly numbered exits and at-grade intersections sequentially by county, with a one-letter prefix indicating the county. Interchanges in Westchester County were prefixed with W (e.g., W5), Putnam with P, Dutchess with D, and Columbia with C. The Taconic Parkway received mile-based exit numbers in the summer of 2017 as part of an ongoing sign replacement project.
  - Exits on the Berkshire Spur (part of which is I-90) of the New York Thruway are B1, B2, and B3, as the spur is part of the mainline ticket system. (Exits 1, 2, and 3 on the mainline Thruway are in Yonkers).
- North Carolina uses mileage-based exit numbers on all freeways. Additionally, exit numbers are often assigned to major grade-separated interchanges, even if the road is not a freeway, such as the interchange between the boulevard-grade US 70 and I-540 in Wake County.
- Oklahoma posts exit numbers on its turnpike system.
- Oregon originally did not post exit numbers on any of its non-Interstates. In the 1990s, the Oregon Department of Transportation began numbering most sections of its freeways with mile-based exits, starting with US 26 and OR 217 west of Portland. As of 2013, almost all Oregon freeway interchanges are numbered; new interchanges are also numbered. (These exits are based on internal limited-access road mileage; see State highways in Oregon for an explanation on these differences.)
- Pennsylvania's non-Interstate highways that have numbered exits are still numbered sequentially (such as the freeway portion of PA 28 between Pittsburgh and Kittanning) with the exception of the toll roads that are part of the Pennsylvania Turnpike system. PA 60 was one of these roads, but the numbers were converted to the mileage-based system (since reversed) in November 2009 when I-376 replaced PA 60 to Mercer County. The Lehigh Valley Thruway (US 22) through Bethlehem and US 30 between York and Lancaster have no exit numbering, but do have mileposts that reflect the appropriate distance from the West Virginia border. Additionally, freeway sections can have independent milepost systems that apply exclusively to the freeway: an example of this being the Robert Casey Highway-US 6 extending northeast of Scranton, which has mileposts reflecting the length of the freeway section.
- Rhode Island has mile-based exit numbers on Route 99 as of December 2017, on Route 4, Route 78, Route 403, and the Airport Connector as of December 2018, on Route 146 as of summer 2019, and on Route 10, Route 24, and Route 37 as of February 2020.
- Tennessee generally does not post exit numbers on its non-Interstate freeways, with the exceptions of Nashville's partial beltway SR 155 (Briley Parkway) and the controlled-access segment of SR 386 (Vietnam Veterans Boulevard).
- Texas currently has four non-interstates that use exit numbers. US 75 uses a sequential scheme. Due to a major reconstruction project in the 1990s, which combined many exits, these jump from 8B to 20B. A stretch of US 82 from Whitesboro to Honey Grove in North Texas has exits 622 through 686. US 54 in El Paso uses sequential exits, starting at exit 20. SH 130 uses mile-based exits starting at 497 and decreases to 411 at its northern terminus. Exits on other freeways are based on a statewide reference system where the exit number is determined by the distance from either the northernmost (northwest corner of the Texas Panhandle, for north-south routes) or westernmost (Texas–New Mexico–Mexico tripoint, near El Paso, for east-west routes) geographic reference point in Texas.
- Utah's higher-density freeways have exit numbers, including SR 154 (Bangerter Highway),SR 201, and SR 67 (Legacy Parkway). Ten miles of US 89 in Davis County and US 40/US 189 between I-80 and SR 32 are signed with exit numbers. Also, US 6/US 191 in Price is signed with exit numbers using US 6 mileage.
- Vermont does not use the mileage-based system on non-Interstates, although supplemental "Milepoint Exit" placards indicating the mile-based exit number are being added to existing signage, with two exceptions: VT 127 and VT 289 in the Burlington area. The numbers would have been continuous if the Chittenden County Circumferential Highway were completed. The numbers start at Manhattan Drive just north of Burlington and end at Interstate 89 near Williston. Freeway sections of US 4 and US 7 in the western part of the state use sequential numbering.
- Washington state does not number most of its non-Interstate freeway exits. Three exceptions are SR 14 from Vancouver to Camas (since the 1990s), SR 16 from Tacoma to its western terminus at SR 3 in Gorst (since 2006, with the numbering extending along SR 3 north to Silverdale), all milepost-based. It is unclear if other freeways will receive numbers in the future.
- West Virginia has only one non-Interstate with exit numbers, the US 22 freeway in Weirton.
- Wisconsin has exit numbers on the freeway and expressway portions of US 10, US 12, Wisconsin Highway 16 (WIS 16), WIS 26, WIS 29, WIS 30, WIS 64, US 41, US 45, US 51, US 53, WIS 145, and US 151.

== States that renumbered exits ==
Many states formerly used sequential numbers, and in some cases used exit numbers sparingly, if at all. The following states have introduced mile-based exit numbering on some or all of their highways:

- California: Began widespread exit numbering in January 2002, although some exits in Los Angeles received mile-based numbers in the 1970s. California was the only state not to require exit numbers or mileposts, because most of their highway system was built prior to the enactment of the federal requirement. Before adopting exit numbering, California relied on its system of county-based mileposts on all highways, without having explicitly numbered exits. Originally, the initial completion date for installing exit numbers statewide was set for November 2004. But because of California's budget concerns, exits (especially in the Greater Los Angeles and San Francisco Bay areas) have generally been numbered only when signs needed to be replaced. The state may eventually replace all older overhead signs (and thus add exit numbers) as part of an energy-saving measure: in 2014, Roads & Bridges reported that the California Department of Transportation was testing types of reflective sheeting to eliminate the need for electrical-sign lighting. In addition, these new signs do not require the use of a catwalk with electrical lamps, greatly reducing the chance of the signs being vandalized.
- Colorado: Initially sequential, used dual mile/sequential plates in the mid-1970s.
- Connecticut: Started a gradual transition from sequential to mileage-based exit numbers in 2015, with SR 695 and I-395 converted that year, and Route 2A in early 2016 under the same contract. As of April 2023, I-691, Route 9, Route 17 (Middletown section), Route 72, Route 82, and SR 571 have been converted to mile-based exits as part of ongoing sign replacement projects. The next freeways to be converted are Route 40 in 2023; Route 2, Route 3, Route 11, and Route 17 (Glastonbury section) in 2024; followed by Route 8 and Route 25, also scheduled for 2024. Two short freeways whose exits were previously unnumbered, Route 184 and Route 349 in Groton received mileage-based exit numbers starting in 2018 as part of a sign replacement project that includes I-95 from New London to the Rhode Island state line (this section of I-95 will retain sequential exit numbers for the time being until signs along the entire length of I-95 are updated and ready for conversion). Exit numbers on other highways will be converted to mile-based numbering by 2030 as existing highway signs reach the end of their serviceable life and are replaced with new signage. As highways are converted to mile-based exit numbers, sequential numbers will be posted on "Old Exit XX" placards on advance guide signs and gore signs for at least two years following the conversion.
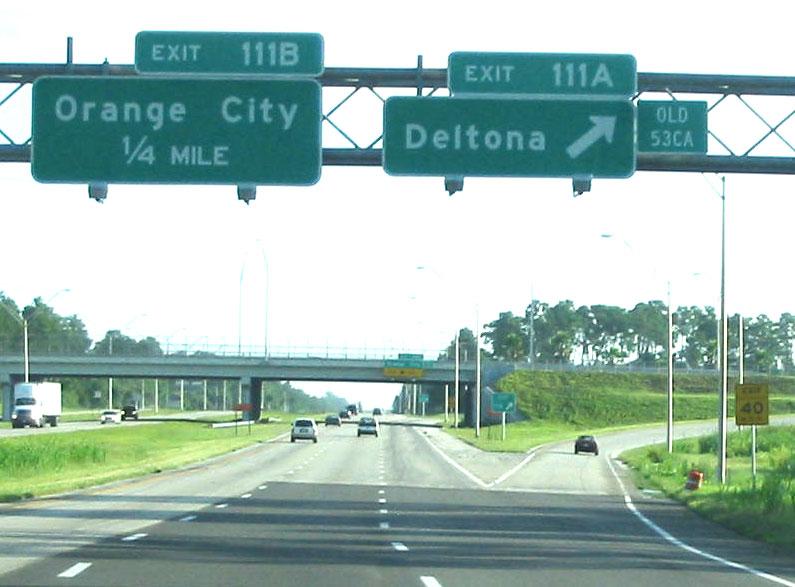
  Mile-based exit numbers on I-4 in Volusia County, Florida, circa 2003. In this case, mile-based exits 111A and 111B had been sequential exits 53CA and 53CB, as the tab shows. The extra tabs have been removed and the signs now solely use the mileage based exits.
- Florida: Began January 28, 2002, now complete. However, I-110 retained its sequential exit numbers.
- Georgia: Began January 4, 2000, now complete, no former exit signs were used in the renumbering. (Interstate highways only).
- Illinois formerly did not number exits on its original Illinois Tollways, including those overlaid with Interstate Highways. Starting with I-355 (a toll road from its inception in 1989), toll roads began to be numbered according to standard mile-based exit signage. From the 1990s through the 2010s, Illinois gradually added exit numbers to its remaining toll Interstates.
- Indiana: Around 1980. Exits on I-69 between Indianapolis and the Michigan state line underwent a second renumbering in 2012, when the first portion of the I-69 extension to Evansville opened that year.
- Iowa: Adopted distance-based exit numbering in 1977.
- Kentucky and Indiana: While both states have long used the mile-log system for their Interstate highways, the two states are in the process of renumbering exits along Interstate 265, which will eventually form a partial loop around Louisville. While the highway has been continuous since the 2016 opening of the Lewis and Clark Bridge across the Ohio River, the portion between Interstate 71 in Kentucky and Interstate 65 in Indiana has been signed as state highways (KY 841 and IN 265). Notably, both the Kentucky and Indiana segments of I-265 had an Exit 10. Indiana started its numbering at the intersection of I-265 and I-64, with the highway's interchange with SR 62 as exit 10. Kentucky started its numbering at the southern terminus of KY 841 with Dixie Highway (US 31W), with its exit 10 at the interchange with I-65. With the renumbering, set for completion in fall 2026, I-265 will have a continuous exit numbering sequence, starting with the Kentucky I-65 interchange and not resetting at the river.
- Maine: May 15, 2004 (experimented with dual exit/mile tabs in the 1970s). Sequential exit numbers were retained for two years on yellow "Formerly Exit XX" placards below advance guide signs, which have since been removed.
- Maryland - All Interstates use mileage-based exits except for the unsigned I-595, it uses miles based on US 50 starting with the District of Columbia border.
- Massachusetts - Completed conversion to mileage-based exit numbers in August 2021. The state had planned to start transition from sequential to mile-based exit numbers in 2016, but was halted due to local opposition from residents of Cape Cod. After being denied a waiver from the Federal Highway Administration to retain its sequential numbering, MassDOT announced in November 2019 that transition to mileage-based exit numbers would begin in 2020. There will be a transition period where the sequential exit numbers will be posted on "OLD EXIT XX" placards below advance guide signs and exit gore signs for at least 2 years.
- Mississippi: 1980s.
- New Jersey: Around 1970. The New Jersey Turnpike kept sequential exit numbering.
- New York: New Interstates (I-781 and I-99) have mileage-based exit numbers. The state has no timeline for converting its remaining highways to mileage-based numbering, although it appears that NYSDOT and NYSTA will gradually transition to mile-based exit numbers through sign replacement projects, as evidenced by a sign replacement and exit numbering contract for the Taconic State Parkway completed in 2017, and a similar contract to replace signs and renumber exits on I-84 that was completed in 2019. Exit numbers on the Hutchinson River Parkway were converted from sequential to mileage-based in the summer of 2021. Bills directing the NYSDOT and the New York State Thruway Authority to renumber exits from sequential to mile-based have been introduced into the state legislature since 2008, none of which have been approved by both chambers. On routes where exit numbers are converted, "Old Exit XX" placards will be placed alongside advanced guide signs for a period of time for motorists to adjust to the new numbering system. Interstate 81, Interstate 690, and New York State Route 481 have been renumbered to distance based interchange numbers when I-81 was relocated in the Syracuse area. In September 2026, NYSDOT announced they would be changing the exit numbers on I88 to the mile based system with work expected to be completed by the end of 2026.
- North Dakota: 1980s.
- Ohio: I-475 was its first highway to receive mileage-based exit numbers, in October 1974. The Ohio Turnpike used both systems from January 1998 to September 2002.
- Pennsylvania: Began April 2001 on Interstates and all highways of the Pennsylvania Turnpike system. Prior to renumbering, junctions solely between two-digit interstates were not numbered (for example, the junction of I-79 and I-80). Sequential numbering skipped these junctions. Signage approaching many interchanges still includes former sequential numbers on "Old Exit XX" placards below the exit signs. Neither Interstate 579 nor Interstate 676 have exit numbers.
- Rhode Island: Transition was supposed to occur in four phases starting in 2016, with the full conversion scheduled for completion by the end of 2019. Interstate 295 was the first highway in Rhode Island to receive mile-based exit numbers, starting in November 2017. Mile-based exit numbers have been added to Route 146 as part of a sign replacement project. Conversion completed in November 2022, with I-95 the last remaining highway in the state.
- Texas: Late 1970s.
- Utah: New exit numbers were implemented for interchanges in the northern counties of Juab, Utah, Salt Lake, Davis, Weber, and Box Elder due to a surveying error when I-15 was first built in Utah. The route originally curved around the west of Nephi, but was changed to the east. The original surveyor measurements did not reflect this change, and UDOT corrected this error after GPS systems began to give wrong mileage directions.
- Vermont reached an agreement with the FHWA in 2019 to use dual sequential/mile-based exit numbers. Under the approved plan, existing sequential exit numbers will be retained for at least the next decade, but a supplemental mile-based exit number will be added to each exit sign starting in the spring 2020. The agreement stipulates that Vermont must convert to mile-based exit numbers during the next round of sign replacements, planned for some point in the 2030s.
- Virginia: Early 1990s, exceptions include SR 267 (suburban Washington, D.C.), I-581 (Roanoke), and I-664 (Newport News - Chesapeake). I-581 and I-664 both utilize sequential exit numbers, furthermore, exit 1 is at the highways' northern ends. Virginia did not post temporary placards indicating the former exit numbers after the conversion.

== Early exit numbers ==
- In April 1938, the New York City Department of Parks installed exit numbers on New York City's parkways, specifically:
  - Grand Central Parkway: 1 at Triborough Bridge to 11 at Kew Gardens, and on to 24 at Marcus Avenue, then continuing from 25 (Lakeville Road) on the Northern State Parkway (run by the Long Island State Park Commission, which also planned numbers on its other parkways)
  - Interborough Parkway (now the Jackie Robinson Parkway): 4 at Pennsylvania Avenue to 11 at Kew Gardens (exits 1, 2, and 3 were intended for a formerly proposed extension to Belt Parkway)
  - Henry Hudson Parkway: 9 at 72nd Street to 19 at Mosholu Parkway (exits 1-8 being along the West Side Highway, starting at The Battery)
  - Hutchinson River Parkway: beginning with 7 in Pelham Bay Park
- As other New York-area parkways were completed, they too received numbers.
  - Connecticut's Merritt Parkway (Route 15) received sequential numbers in 1948, continuing the numbers of the Hutchinson River Parkway. The Merritt Parkway's lowest-numbered exit remains exit 27, although the Hutchinson exits were renumbered; traveling towards Connecticut, exit 30 is encountered at the border (also the beginning of Route 15), where the number resets to 27 before reascending. The remainder of Route 15's exit numbers (on the Wilbur Cross Parkway and Wilbur Cross Highway) continue the Merritt sequence.
- The Pennsylvania Turnpike had sequential numbers when its first section opened on October 1, 1940, eventually using exits 1 to 30 for the mainline from Ohio to New Jersey. When the Northeast Extension was opened in the 1950s, it numbered the exits from 31 to 38 (and later 39). Only exit 31 retained its original number when the exits were renumbered.
- The New Jersey Turnpike had sequential numbers when it opened in late 1951.
- In the early 1950s, New Jersey's Garden State Parkway opened, probably the first road to use distance-based exit numbers.
- The Gulf Freeway (US 75, later I-45) in Houston, Texas, had sequential numbers by 1956. The numbering scheme started at the freeway's northern end in downtown Houston, and counted up towards the southeast and Galveston.
- Massachusetts started handing out exit numbers in the 1950s to its freeways in and around the Boston area, with an uncommon system of making sure every freeway's intersection with Route 128 was exit 25, numbers increasing away from Boston. Starting in 1976, these freeways started to receive more conventional numbering. As of 2023, Massachusetts has converted to a mileage based system, and all such freeways have since been renumbered using mileage-based exits.
