= U.S. Route 25 in Kentucky =

Highway in Kentucky

U.S. Route 25
- US 25 highlighted in red

Route information
- Maintained by KYTC
- Length: 176.882 mi (284.664 km)
- Existed: November 11, 1926–present

Major junctions
- South end: US 25E / US 25W in North Corbin
- Hal Rogers Parkway in London; I-75 near Mount Vernon; I-75 in Mount Vernon; I-75 in Richmond; US 60 in Lexington; US 68 in Lexington; US 42 / US 127 in Florence; I-275 in Crestview Hills; I-71 / I-75 in Fort Mitchell; I-71 / I-75 in Covington
- North end: US 42 / US 127 just past Ohio state line in Covington

Location
- Country: United States
- State: Kentucky
- Counties: Laurel, Rockcastle, Madison, Fayette, Scott, Grant, Boone, Kenton

Highway system
- United States Numbered Highway System; List; Special; Divided; Kentucky State Highway System; Interstate; US; State; Parkways
← I-24	→ KY 26

U.S. Route 25 (US 25) runs for 176.882 miles (284.664 km) across the state of Kentucky from the split between US 25E and US 25W in North Corbin to US 42/US 127 at the Ohio state line in Covington.

== Route description ==
US 25 technically crosses the Tennessee state line in two places—near Jellico, Tennessee, and near Middlesboro—where a split US 25 enters Kentucky as US 25W and US 25E respectively. In North Corbin, the two suffixed highways meet to reform US 25. US 25 runs primarily northward, paralleling Interstate 75 (I-75) along the entire route. From North Corbin, US 25 heads north, passing through London and then heading northwest toward Mount Vernon. After going through Livingston and Mount Vernon, US 25 continues to run northward, passing through Berea. US 25 then meets US 421, which begins a long concurrency with US 25, and the two routes go around Richmond on a bypass.

North of Richmond, US 25/US 421 runs concurrently with I-75 to cross the Kentucky River. Just north of the river, US 25/US 421 splits from I-75 and runs northwesterly into Lexington. In Lexington, US 25 meets US 60 and US 27, and US 68 before US 421 splits off to the northwest. US 25 continues north through Georgetown, where it meets US 62 and US 460. The highway continues through Corinth, Williamstown, Dry Ridge, Crittenden, and Walton. In Florence, US 25 meets US 42 and US 127, both of which run concurrently with US 25.

The three routes run northeast through Erlanger, Edgewood, Crestview Hills, Lakeside Park, Fort Mitchell, Fort Wright, Park Hills, and Covington, and intersect I-275 in Crestview Hills and I-71 and I-75 twice in Fort Mitchell and Covington. In Covington, the three routes begin to cross the Ohio River on the Clay Wade Bailey Bridge. At the Ohio state line, US 25 ends, and US 42/US 127 continues into downtown Cincinnati.

== Major intersections ==
County	Location	mi	km	Destinations	Notes
Laurel	North Corbin	0.000	0.000	US 25E south (Cumberland Gap Parkway) / US 25W south (West Dixie Highway) to I-75	US 25 south splits into US 25E and US 25W
Laurel		0.774	1.246	KY 2392 north	Southern terminus of KY 2392
Laurel		1.965	3.162	KY 1223 west / KY 3431 south (Hopewell Road)	Southern end of KY 1223 concurrency; northern terminus of KY 3431
Laurel		2.098	3.376	KY 1223 east (Springcut Road)	Northern end of KY 1223 concurrency
Laurel		2.787	4.485	KY 2392 south	Northern terminus of KY 2392
Laurel		4.822	7.760	KY 552 west	Eastern terminus of KY 552
Laurel		6.953	11.190	KY 1189 east (Rocky Branch Road)	Western terminus of KY 1189
Laurel	London	9.028	14.529	KY 1006 (Old Whitley Road / Levi Jackson Mill Road)	
Laurel	London	9.530	15.337	KY 2069 west (Middleground Highway)	Eastern terminus of KY 2069
Laurel	London	10.505	16.906	KY 192	
Laurel	London	10.972	17.658	KY 2391 north (South Dixie Street) / Armory Street	Southern terminus of KY 2391
Laurel	London	11.255	18.113	KY 229 south (Barbourville Street)	Northern terminus of KY 229
Laurel	London	11.893	19.140	KY 363 south (West Dixie Street)	Northern terminus of KY 363
Laurel	London	12.119	19.504	KY 80 east (East Fourth Street) / West Fourth Street	Southern end of KY 80 concurrency
Laurel	London	12.163	19.574	KY 1006 south (West Fifth Street) / East Fifth Street	Northern terminus of KY 1006
Laurel	London	12.641	20.344	KY 1769 north (Moren Road)	Southern terminus of KY 1769
Laurel	London	12.916	20.786	KY 3432 west (West 16th Street)	Eastern terminus of KY 3432
Laurel	London	13.505	21.734	KY 6259 south (CVB Drive)	Northern terminus of KY 6259
Laurel	London	13.621	21.921	KY 80 west / Hal Rogers Parkway east to I-75 – Hazard, Manchester	Northern end of KY 80 concurrency; historic western terminus of Hal Rogers Pkwy.
Laurel		15.147	24.377	KY 3434 north	Southern terminus of KY 3434
Laurel		15.821	25.461	KY 2041 south (Glenview Road)	Northern terminus of KY 2041
Laurel		16.383	26.366	KY 490 north	Southern terminus of KY 490
Laurel		17.358	27.935	KY 3094 east / Violet Lane	Western terminus of KY 3094
Laurel		17.596	28.318	KY 3010 north (Dean Hundley Road)	Southern terminus of KY 3010
Laurel		19.515	31.406	KY 3008 west (Bentley Road) / Old Hare Road	Eastern terminus of KY 3008
Laurel		23.512	37.839	KY 909 south to I-75	Northern terminus of KY 909
Rockcastle		24.092	38.772	KY 1329 west (Upper River Road) – Luner	Eastern terminus of KY 1329
Rockcastle	Livingston	28.649	46.106	KY 490 south (South Upper River Road) to KY 1955 / School Street	Northern terminus of KY 490
Rockcastle	Burr	35.616	57.318	KY 1004 east (Orlando Road) / Commercial Lane – Orlando	Western terminus of KY 1004
Rockcastle	Burr	35.713	57.475	I-75	I-75 exit 59
Rockcastle		36.193	58.247	KY 3274 south (Old Chestnut Ridge Road)	Northern terminus of KY 3274
Rockcastle		36.821	59.258	KY 2224 south	Northern terminus of KY 2224
Rockcastle	Mount Vernon	37.462	60.289	KY 1326 west (East Main Street)	Eastern terminus of KY 1326
Rockcastle	Mount Vernon	37.718	60.701	KY 2323 north (Church Street)	Southern terminus of KY 2323
Rockcastle	Mount Vernon	37.831	60.883	US 150 west (Crab Orchard Road) / KY 1249 south (Sand Springs Road) – Stanford, Pongo	Eastern terminus of US 150; northern terminus of KY 1249
Rockcastle	Mount Vernon	37.879	60.960	KY 1326 (Main Street) – Brodhead	
Rockcastle	Mount Vernon	38.967	62.711	KY 461 south (Cumberland Lake Parkway) – Somerset	Northern terminus of KY 461
Rockcastle	Mount Vernon	39.727– 39.746	63.934– 63.965	I-75 – Knoxville, Lexington	I-75 exit 62
Rockcastle	Renfro Valley	40.436	65.075	KY 2793 (Green Hill Road / Doc Wolfe Road) – Lake Linville	
Rockcastle		43.185	69.500	KY 3275 north (Hurricane School Road) / Ladyslipper Lane, Green Hill Cemetery Road	Southern terminus of KY 3275
Rockcastle		44.433	71.508	KY 1617 north (Scaffold Cane Road) to KY 1786 east (Wildie Road) – Berea, Wildie	Southern terminus of KY 1617
Rockcastle		46.603	75.000	KY 1505 south (Brindle Ridge Road) – Brodhead	Northern terminus of KY 1505
Madison	Berea	53.864	86.686	KY 21 west (Chestnut Street) to I-75 – Wallaceton	Southern end of KY 21 concurrency
Madison	Berea	54.811	88.210	KY 21 east (Prospect Street) – Bighill	Northern end of KY 21 concurrency
Madison	Berea	54.895	88.345	KY 595 (Main Street) – Buggytown	
Madison	Berea	55.321	89.031	KY 1016 north (Estill Street) – Bobtown	Southern terminus of KY 1016
Madison	Berea	56.857	91.502	KY 956 west to I-75 / KY 595	Eastern terminus of KY 956
Madison	Berea	59.033	95.004	KY 1983 south (White Station Road)	Northern terminus of KY 1983
Madison		60.571	97.480	KY 499 east (Crooksville Road) – Irvine	Western terminus of KY 499
Madison	Terrill	63.028	101.434	US 421 south	Southern end of US 421 concurrency
Madison		64.029	103.045	KY 2872 west (Duncannon Lane) to I-75	Eastern terminus of KY 2872
Madison	Richmond	66.443	106.930	US 25 Bus. north / US 421 Bus. north (Big Hill Avenue) / KY 876 west (Eastern Bypass)	Southern terminus of US 25 Bus./US 421 Bus.; eastern terminus of KY 876
Madison	Richmond	67.200	108.148	KY 52 (East Main Street) – Lancaster, Irvine	
Madison	Richmond	69.699	112.170	KY 1986 north to KY 388 (Red House Road) / Transport Court – Union City, Redhouse	Southern terminus of KY 1986
Madison		70.875	114.062	US 25 Bus. south / US 421 Bus. south (Lexington Road) / KY 2875 north (McCord Lane)	Northern terminus of US 25 Bus./US 421 Bus.; southern terminus of KY 2875
Madison	Richmond	71.179	114.551	I-75 – Lexington, Knoxville	I-75 exits 90A-B
Madison	Richmond	71.965	115.816	KY 1156 north (Jacks Creek Road) – Valley View	Southern terminus of KY 1156
Madison		73.458	118.219	KY 2878 north	Southern terminus of KY 2878
Madison	Blue Grass	76.374	122.912	KY 627 north / KY 3055 south (White Hall Shrine Road) – Winchester, White Hall State Historic Site	Southern terminus of KY 627; northern terminus of KY 3055
Madison		78.797	126.811	KY 2328 north (Lexington Road)	Southern terminus of KY 2328
Madison		79.039– 79.162	127.201– 127.399	I-75 south / KY 2884 east (Igo Road) – Knoxville	Southern end of I-75 concurrency; western terminus of KY 2884; I-75 exit 97
Fayette	Lexington	79.975– 80.051	128.707– 128.830	I-75 north / KY 2328 south (Old Richmond Road)	Northern end of I-75 concurrency; northern terminus of KY 2328; I-75 exit 99
Fayette	Lexington	82.520	132.803	KY 1973 north (South Cleveland Road)	Southern terminus of KY 1973
Fayette	Lexington	84.807	136.484	KY 1975 north (Jacks Creek Pike)	Northern terminus of KY 1975
Fayette	Lexington	88.115	141.807	KY 418 east (Athens Boonesboro Road)	Western terminus of KY 418
Fayette	Lexington	90.710– 90.811	145.984– 146.146	KY 4 (New Circle Road)	KY 4 exit 15
Fayette	Lexington	93.408	150.326	US 60 east (Midland Avenue)	Southern end of US 60 concurrency
Fayette	Lexington	94.144	151.510	US 27 / US 68 / US 60 west (South Broadway)	Northern end of US 60 concurrency
Fayette	Lexington	94.420	151.954	KY 1928 west (Jefferson Street) / Jefferson Street	Eastern terminus of KY 1928
Fayette	Lexington	94.607	152.255	US 421 west (West Main Street) / KY 922 south (Oliver Lewis Way)	Northern end of US 421 concurrency; southern end of KY 922 concurrency
Fayette	Lexington	95.108	153.061	KY 922 north (Newtown Pike) / West Fourth Street	Northern end of KY 922 concurrency
Fayette	Lexington	96.081– 96.191	154.627– 154.804	KY 4 (New Circle Road)	KY 4 exit 8
Fayette	Lexington	98.239	158.100	KY 1977 west (Spurr Road) / Spurr Road	Eastern terminus of KY 1977
Fayette	Lexington	99.390	159.953	KY 2886 west (Kearney Road)	Eastern terminus of KY 2886
Fayette	Lexington	101.649	163.588	KY 1973 south (Ironworks Pike) to I-75	Southern end of KY 1973 concurrency
Fayette	Lexington	102.186	164.452	KY 1963 north (Lisle Road) / KY 1973 north (Ironworks Road)	Northern end of KY 1973 concurrency; southern terminus of KY 1963
Scott	Georgetown	104.299	167.853	US 62 (McClelland Circle) / US 460 Byp.	
Scott	Georgetown	106.181	170.882	US 460 (Main Street)	
Scott	Georgetown	108.311	174.310	KY 32 (Champion Way / Long Lick Road)	
Scott		110.848	178.393	KY 620 east (Burton Pike)	Southern end of KY 620 concurrency
Scott		111.088	178.779	KY 620 west (Cherry Blossom Way) to I-75	Northern end of KY 620 concurrency
Scott		112.808	181.547	KY 620 west (Rogers Gap Road)	Eastern terminus of KY 620
Scott		116.429	187.374	KY 2910 south (Hayden Lane)	Northern terminus of KY 2910
Scott		117.236	188.673	KY 620 east (Double Culvert Road)	Southern end of KY 620 concurrency
Scott		117.245	188.688	KY 620 west (Double Culvert Road)	Northern end of KY 620 concurrency
Scott		118.842	191.258	KY 32 west (Porter Road) to I-75	Southern end of KY 32 concurrency
Scott		119.098	191.670	KY 32 east	Northern end of KY 32 concurrency
Scott		119.961	193.059	KY 2907 west (Eagle Spring Road)	Eastern terminus of KY 2907
Scott		122.862	197.727	KY 608 west (Frogtown Road)	Eastern terminus of KY 608
Scott		122.893	197.777	KY 356 east (Stone Lane)	Western terminus of KY 356
Grant	Corinth	127.859	205.769	KY 330 west to I-75	Southern end of KY 330 concurrency
Grant	Corinth	128.103	206.162	KY 330 east (Corinth Road)	Northern end of KY 330 concurrency
Grant		130.557	210.111	KY 2936 west (Keefer Road)	Eastern terminus of KY 2936
Grant		132.780	213.689	KY 1993 west (Lawrenceville Road)	Eastern terminus of KY 1993
Grant	Williamstown	135.828	218.594	KY 2937 west (Hickory Road) / Cherry Grove Road	Eastern terminus of KY 2937
Grant	Williamstown	136.627	219.880	KY 36 east (Cordova Road)	Southern end of KY 36 concurrency
Grant	Williamstown	138.075	222.210	KY 36 west to I-75	Northern end of KY 36 concurrency
Grant	Williamstown	138.998	223.696	KY 22 east (Paris Street) / Court Street	Southern end of KY 22 concurrency
Grant	Williamstown	139.257	224.112	KY 3025 north (Helton Road)	Southern terminus of KY 3025
Grant	Williamstown	141.096	227.072	US 25 Bus. north (KY 22 Bus. west / Arnie Risen Road)	Southern terminus of US 25 Bus./KY 22 Bus.
Grant	Dry Ridge	141.987	228.506	KY 2501 south	Northern terminus of KY 2501
Grant	Dry Ridge	142.210	228.865	KY 467 east (Knoxville Road) / Knoxville Road	Southern end of KY 467 concurrency
Grant	Dry Ridge	143.404	230.786	KY 22 west / KY 467 west (Dry Ridge Bypass)	Northern end of KY 22/KY 467 concurrency
Grant	Dry Ridge	143.620	231.134	US 25 Bus. south (North Main Street)	Northern terminus of US 25 Bus.
Grant	Sherman	147.068	236.683	KY 1994 west	Eastern terminus of KY 1994
Grant	Crittenden	149.321	240.309	KY 2942 west (Crittenden-Mt. Zion Road)	Eastern terminus of KY 2942
Grant	Crittenden	149.899	241.239	KY 491 east (Gardnersville Road)	Southern end of KY 491 concurrency
Grant	Crittenden	150.858	242.782	KY 491 west (Violet Road) to I-75	Northern end of KY 491 concurrency
Kenton		152.811	245.925	KY 2046 east (Bagby Road)	Western terminus of KY 2046
Kenton		153.509	247.049	KY 14 east (Bracht-Piner Road)	Southern end of KY 14 concurrency
Kenton		154.374	248.441	KY 2043 north (Green Road)	Southern terminus of KY 2043
Boone	Walton	156.947	252.582	KY 14 west / KY 16 north (Mary Grubbs Way) to I-71 / I-75 / Mary Grubbs Way	Northern end of KY 14 concurrency; southern end of KY 16 concurrency
Boone	Walton	158.741	255.469	KY 16 north (Walton-Nicholson Road)	Northern end of KY 16 concurrency
Boone		159.059	255.981	KY 2951 west (Chambers Road) / Old Lexington Pike	Eastern terminus of KY 2951
Boone	Richwood	161.335	259.644	KY 338 north (Richwood Road) to I-75 / Richwood Road	Interchange; Southern terminus of KY 338
Boone		162.238	261.097	KY 3060 west (Frogtown Road) / East Frogtown Road	Eastern terminus of KY 3060
Boone		164.120	264.126	KY 536 (Mt. Zion Road) to I-71 / I-75	
Boone		164.925	265.421	KY 842 east (Weaver Road) / Richardson Road	Western terminus of KY 842
Boone	Florence	165.475	266.306	KY 2847 west (Empire Drive)	Eastern terminus of KY 2847
Boone	Florence	165.745	266.741	KY 1829 (Industrial Road)	
Boone	Florence	167.080	268.889	US 42 west / US 127 south / Main Street	Southern end of US 42/US 127 concurrency
Boone	Florence	167.481	269.535	KY 1017 west (Turfway Road) / Main Street	Eastern terminus of KY 1017
Kenton	Erlanger	168.982	271.950	KY 236 (Commonwealth Avenue / Stevenson Road)	
Kenton	Erlanger	169.681	273.075	KY 2373 north (Kenton Lands Road)	Southern terminus of KY 2373
Kenton	Crestview Hills	170.445	274.305	I-275 to I-71 / I-75 – Airport	I-275 exit 83
Kenton	Lakeside Park	171.112	275.378	KY 1303 south (Turkey Foot Road) / Hudson Avenue	
Kenton	Lakeside Park	171.489	275.985	KY 371 north (Buttermilk Pike) / Huckleberry Hill Drive	Southern end of KY 371 concurrency
Kenton	Fort Mitchell	171.573	276.120	KY 371 south (Orphanage Road)	Northern end of KY 371 concurrency
Kenton	Fort Mitchell	172.708– 172.837	277.947– 278.154	I-71 / I-75 – Cincinnati, Lexington, Louisville	I-75 exit 188
Kenton	Fort Mitchell	173.746	279.617	KY 1072 south (Kyles Lane) to I-71 / I-75	Southern end of KY 1072 concurrency
Kenton	Fort Mitchell	173.901	279.867	KY 1072 (Sleepy Hollow Road)	Northern end of KY 1072 concurrency
Kenton	Covington	175.614– 175.662	282.623– 282.701	I-71 / I-75 – Lexington, Louisville, Cincinnati	I-75 exit 191
Kenton	Covington	176.274	283.686	5th Street (KY 8 east)	One-way street
Kenton	Covington	176.356	283.817	4th Street (KY 8 west)	One-way street
Ohio River		176.882	284.664	US 42 north / US 127 north (Clay Wade Bailey Bridge)	National northern terminus at state line; northern end of US 42/US 127 concurrency; highway continues into Ohio as US 42/US 127 north
1.000 mi = 1.609 km; 1.000 km = 0.621 mi: Concurrency terminus

== See also ==
U.S. Route 25
Previous state: Tennessee	Kentucky	Next state: Terminus
