= Kentucky Route 52 =

State highway in Kentucky, United States

Kentucky Route 52
- KY 52 highlighted in red

Route information
- Maintained by KYTC
- Length: 167.399 mi (269.403 km)

Major junctions
- West end: US 62 in Boston
- Bluegrass Parkway near Boston
- East end: KY 30 near Jackson

Location
- Country: United States
- State: Kentucky
- Counties: Nelson, LaRue, Marion, Boyle, Garrard, Madison, Estill, Lee, Breathitt

Highway system
- Kentucky State Highway System; Interstate; US; State; Parkways
← US 52	→ KY 53

Kentucky Route 52 (KY 52) is a 167-mile-long (269 km) east–west state highway in Kentucky, United States, managed by the Kentucky Transportation Cabinet (KYTC).

Its western terminus is at US Route 62 (US 62) near Boston. It goes through Nelson, LaRue, Marion, Boyle, Garrard, Madison, Estill, Lee, and Breathitt counties. Its eastern terminus is at KY 30 in Breathitt County. It runs through Lebanon, Danville, Lancaster, Richmond, and Beattyville.

In 2005, the four-mile (6.4 km), five-lane stretch of KY 52 in Madison County was completed. It now goes from the Richmond By-Pass to Charle Norris Road in Robinsville. Plans are underway to widen the highway from Richmond to Irvine. The road has also received improvements from Lancaster to Interstate 75 (I-75). In Boyle County, the concrete deck of a bridge was recently replaced.

== Major intersections ==
County	Location	mi	km	Destinations	Notes
Nelson		0.000	0.000	US 62 to KY 61 / I-65 – Elizabethtown, Boston	
Nelson		2.161	3.478	Bluegrass Parkway – Elizabethtown, Lexington	Bluegrass Parkway exit 10
Nelson		5.160	8.304	KY 46 east (Nat Rogers Road)	Western terminus of KY 46
Larue		8.644	13.911	KY 583 north	Southern terminus of KY 583
Nelson	New Haven	11.223	18.062	US 31E north (North Main Street) – Bardstown	Northern end of US 31E concurrency
Nelson	New Haven	11.475	18.467	US 31E south (South Main Street) – Hodgenville	Southern end of US 31E concurrency
Nelson		12.402	19.959	KY 247 south	Western end of KY 247 concurrency
Nelson		14.642	23.564	KY 247 north (Monks Road)	Eastern end of KY 247 concurrency
Nelson		16.416	26.419	KY 457 north	Western end of KY 457 concurrency
Nelson	New Hope	17.302	27.845	KY 457 south (JT Riggs Road)	Eastern end of KY 457 concurrency
Marion	St. Francis	22.176	35.689	KY 527	
Marion	Loretto	23.933	38.516	KY 49 north	Western terminus of KY 49 concurrency
Marion	Loretto	24.473	39.385	KY 49 south	Eastern terminus of KY 49 concurrency
Marion		29.425	47.355	KY 49 north	Western terminus of KY 49 concurrency
Marion		30.762	49.507	KY 327 south	Northern terminus of KY 327
Marion	Lebanon	34.893	56.155	KY 84 west (St. Marys Road)	Eastern terminus of KY 84
Marion	Lebanon	34.999	56.325	KY 2154 (Veterans Memorial Highway) – Springfield, Campbellsville	
Marion	Lebanon	35.928	57.821	KY 55 south (West Walnut Street)	Southern end of KY 55 concurrency
Marion	Lebanon	36.081	58.067	KY 55 north (West Walnut Street)	Northern end of KY 55 concurrency
Marion	Lebanon	36.362	58.519	US 68 west (West Main Street) / KY 49 south (South Proctor Knott Avenue)	Eastern end of KY 49 concurrency; western end of US 68 concurrency
Marion	Lebanon	37.488	60.331	KY 2154 north (Corporate Drive)	Southern terminus of KY 2154
Marion	Lebanon	38.325	61.678	KY 1404 north (Green Valley Drive)	Southern terminus of KY 1404
Marion		38.921	62.637	KY 1195 north (Short Line Pike)	Southern terminus of KY 1195
Marion		47.600	76.605	KY 243 south (Gravel Switch Road)	Northern terminus of KY 243
Boyle		50.941	81.982	KY 34 east (Lebanon Road)	Western terminus of KY 34
Boyle		53.304	85.784	KY 1894 south (Brumfield Road)	Northern terminus of KY 1894
Boyle	Perryville	55.296	88.990	US 150 west (West 2nd Street) – Perryville Battlefield	Western end of US 150 concurrency
Boyle	Perryville	55.315	89.021	US 68 east (North Bragg Street) / KY 1856 south (South Bragg Street)	Eastern end of US 68 concurrency; northern terminus of KY 1859
Boyle		58.845	94.702	KY 1822 north (Quirks Run Road)	Western end of KY 1822 concurrency
Boyle		59.384	95.569	KY 1822 south (Parksville Cross Pike)	Eastern end of KY 1822 concurrency
Boyle	Danville	62.855	101.155	KY 3366 north (Bluegrass Pike)	Southern terminus of KY 3366
Boyle	Danville	63.298	101.868	US 127 Byp. / US 150 Byp. east (Danville Bypass)	B
Boyle	Danville	64.216	103.346	KY 34 west (Quisenberry Avenue)	Western end of KY 34 concurrency
Boyle	Danville	64.744	104.195	US 127 north (Maple Avenue)	Western end of US 127 concurrency; Centre College south of intersection
Boyle	Danville	65.320	105.122	US 127 south (South 4th Street) / KY 33	Eastern end of US 127 concurrency
Boyle	Danville	66.228	106.584	KY 34 east (Wilderness Road)	Eastern end of KY 34 concurrency
Boyle	Danville	67.489	108.613	US 150 east (Stanford Avenue)	Eastern end of US 150 concurrency
Boyle		69.075	111.165	KY 1805 north (Goggin Lane)	Southern terminus of KY 1805
Boyle		69.208	111.379	KY 1273 west (Chrisman Lane)	Eastern terminus of KY 1273
Boyle	Hedgeville	70.362	113.237	KY 590 south (Hubble Road)	Northern terminus of KY 590
Garrard	Lancaster	75.934	122.204	KY 1150 west (Old Danville Road)	Eastern terminus of KY 1150
Garrard	Lancaster	76.785	123.573	US 27 / KY 39 (Lexington Road/Stanford Street) – Nicholasville, Stanford	
Garrard	Hyattsville	80.103	128.913	KY 1295 east (Kirksville Road) – Kirksville	Western terminus of KY 1295
Garrard		84.653	136.236	KY 1972 south (Walker Pike)	Northern terminus of KY 1972
Garrard		84.983	136.767	KY 954 east (Cartersville Road)	Western terminus of KY 954
Madison	Paint Lick	88.529	142.474	KY 21 east	Western terminus of KY 21
Madison		90.242	145.230	KY 595 north (Poosey Ridge Road) – Kirksville, Round Hill, Edenton	Western end of KY 595 concurrency
Madison		91.090	146.595	KY 595 south (Walnut Meadow Road) – Buggytown, Berea	Eastern end of KY 595 concurrency
Madison		93.856	151.047	KY 1295 west (Moran Mill Road) – Kirksville	Eastern terminus of KY 1295
Madison	Caleast	95.477	153.655	KY 2881 south (Caleast Road)	Northern terminus of KY 2881
Madison	Richmond	99.237	159.706	KY 876 (Eastern Bypass) to I-75 – Lexington, Berea	Eastern Kentucky University north of intersection
Madison	Richmond	100.223	161.293	US 25 Bus. / US 421 Bus. north (West Main Street)	Western end of US 25 Bus./US 421 Bus. concurrency
Madison	Richmond	100.369	161.528	KY 388 north (North 2nd Street)	Southern terminus of KY 388
Madison	Richmond	100.976	162.505	US 25 Bus. / US 421 Bus. south (Big Hill Avenue)	Eastern end of US 25 Bus./US 421 Bus. concurrency
Madison	Richmond	102.803	165.445	US 25 / US 421 (Eastern Bypass)	
Madison		105.596	169.940	KY 374 north (Charlie Norris Road) – Union City	Western end of KY 374 concurrency; entrance to Blue Grass Army Depot directly south of intersection
Madison	Moberly	106.855	171.966	KY 374 south (Speedwell Road) – Speedwell	Eastern end of KY 374 concurrency
Madison	Waco	108.862	175.196	KY 977 north (College Hill Road) – College Hill	Southern terminus of KY 977
Estill		122.102	196.504	KY 1353 east	Western terminus of KY 1353
Estill		122.795	197.619	KY 3325 east	Western terminus of KY 3325
Estill		124.089	199.702	KY 1353 / KY 3325 west	Eastern terminus of KY 1353 and KY 3325
Estill		125.643	202.203	KY 594 west	Eastern terminus of KY 594
Estill		127.387	205.010	KY 1457 north	Southern terminus of KY 1457
Estill	West Irvine	127.748	205.590	KY 499 east	Western end of KY 499 concurrency
Estill	West Irvine	127.871	205.788	KY 3327 south (Stacy Lane Road)	Northern terminus of KY 3327
Estill	West Irvine	128.637	207.021	KY 3326 west (Cedar Grove Road)	Eastern terminus of KY 3326
Estill	West Irvine	128.697	207.118	KY 499 west	Eastern end of KY 499 concurrency
Estill		129.268	208.037	KY 89 south (South Irvine Road)	Western end of KY 89 concurrency
Estill	Irvine	129.537	208.470	KY 89 north (Main Street)	Eastern end of KY 89 concurrency
Estill	Irvine	129.769	208.843	KY 1645 (Estill Avenue/Kirkland Avenue)	
Estill	Ravenna	131.429	211.514	KY 1571 east (Main Street)	Western terminus of KY 1571
Estill		136.337	219.413	KY 213 north (Furnace Junction Road)	Southern terminus of KY 213
Estill		139.163	223.961	KY 1182 north (Cobhill Road) to KY 975	Southern terminus of KY 1182
Estill		140.630	226.322	KY 1571 west (Millers Creek Road)	Eastern terminus of KY 1571
Lee		144.742	232.940	KY 1746 north	Southern terminus of KY 1746
Lee		146.513	235.790	KY 2453 west (Old Landing Road)	Eastern terminus of KY 2453
Lee		147.848	237.938	KY 399 south – Heidelberg, Yellow Rock, Youth Haven Bible Camp	Northern terminus of KY 399
Lee		150.291	241.870	KY 498 east to KY 11 – Lee County Area Technology Center, Lee Adjustment Center	Western terminus of KY 498
Lee		153.012	246.249	KY 3331 south (Belle Point Road)	Northern terminus of KY 3331
Lee	Beattyville	155.465	250.197	KY 1144 north (Center Street)	Southern terminus of KY 1144
Lee	Beattyville	155.745	250.647	KY 11 north (Broadway Street)	Western end of KY 11 concurrency
Lee	Beattyville	156.063	251.159	KY 11 south – Booneville	Eastern end of KY 11 concurrency
Lee		160.260	257.913	KY 2016 north	Southern terminus of KY 2016
Lee		163.632	263.340	KY 2017 east – Primrose, Vada	Western terminus of KY 2017
Lee		163.881	263.741	KY 708 north	Western end of KY 708 concurrency
Lee	Tallega	165.716	266.694	KY 708 south	Eastern end of KY 708 concurrency
Breathitt		168.225	270.732	KY 2469 east (Upper Fork Road) – Highland, Shoulderblade	Western terminus of KY 2469
Breathitt		172.362	277.390	KY 541 north	Southern terminus of KY 541
Breathitt		177.401	285.499	KY 30 – Jackson, Booneville	
1.000 mi = 1.609 km; 1.000 km = 0.621 mi: Concurrency terminus
