= Richmond, Kentucky =

- City
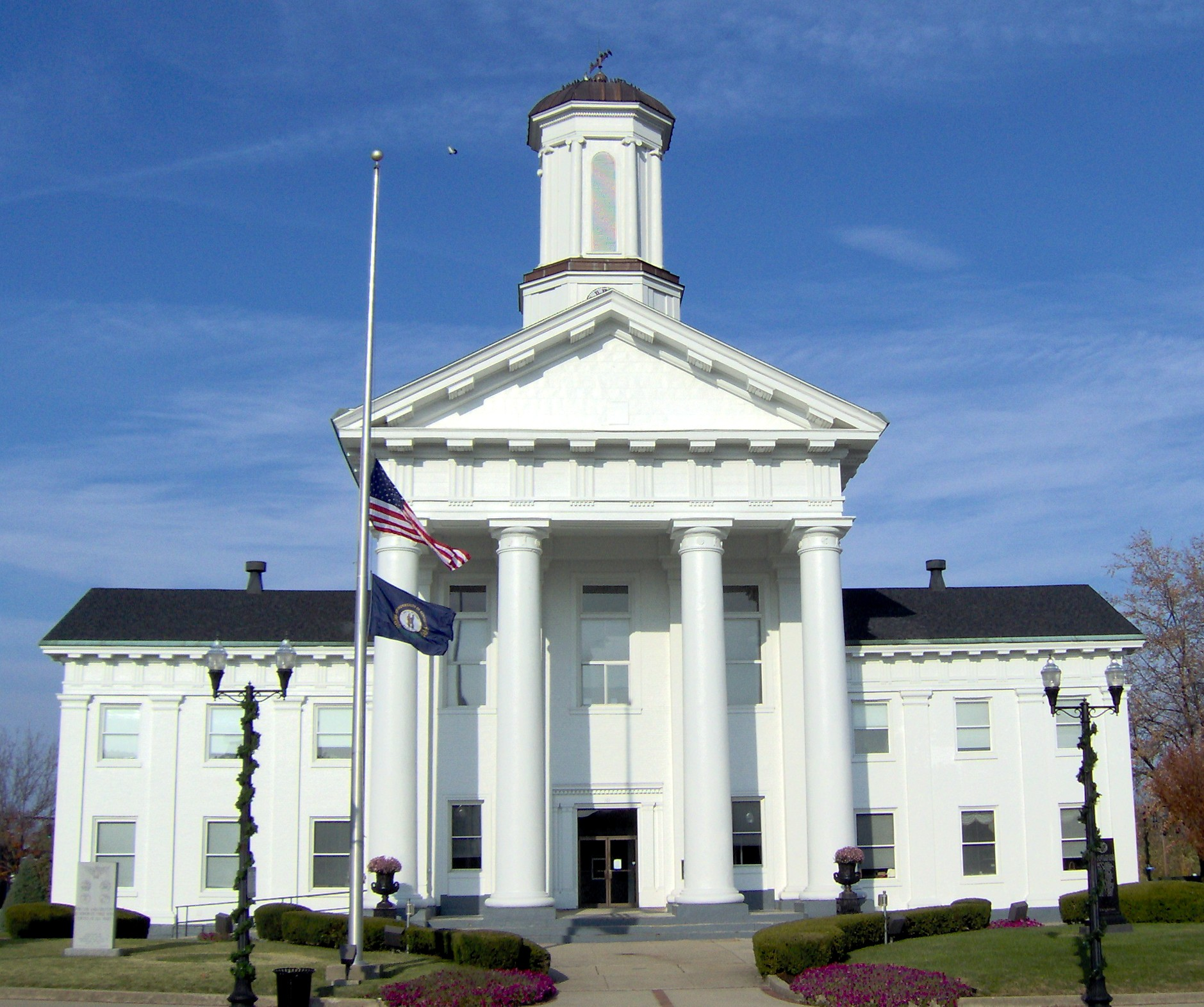
- Madison County courthouse, Richmond, with flags at half-staff in honor of Veterans Day (2007)

- Flag Seal
- Interactive map of Richmond, Kentucky
- Location within Kentucky Location within the United States
- Coordinates: 37°43′52″N 84°17′38″W
- Country: United States
- State: Kentucky
- County: Madison
- Established: 1798
- Named for: Richmond, Virginia

Government
  - Type: City Mayor/Manager
  - Mayor: Robert Blythe

Area
  - Total: 20.57 sq mi (53.28 km^{2})
  - Land: 20.32 sq mi (52.63 km^{2})
  - Water: 0.25 sq mi (0.65 km^{2})
- Elevation: 978 ft (298 m)

Population (2020)
  - Total: 34,585
  - Estimate (2022): 36,129
  - Density: 1,701.9/sq mi (657.12/km^{2})
- Demonym(s): Richmonder, Richmondian
- Time zone: UTC−5 (EST)
  - Summer (DST): UTC−4 (EDT)
- ZIP codes: 40475-40476
- Area code: 859
- FIPS code: 21-65226
- GNIS feature ID: 2404614
- Website: https://richmondky.gov/

Richmond is a city in Madison County, Kentucky, United States. The population was 34,585 as of the 2020 census, making it the state's seventh-largest city. It is the principal city of the Richmond–Berea micropolitan area, which includes all of Madison and Rockcastle counties and had 123,000 residents in 2020.

The city is named after Richmond, Virginia and is home to Eastern Kentucky University. Richmond is the county seat of Madison County and serves as the center for work and shopping in south-central Kentucky. Richmond is home to numerous festivals, notably the Millstone Festival.

== History ==
Richmond was founded in 1798 by Colonel John Miller from Richmond, Virginia. A British American, Miller served with the rebels in the Revolutionary War. According to lore, he was attracted to the area by its good spring water and friendly Native Americans.

With the original county seat of Madison County being Milford, Kentucky, Miller successfully lobbied the Kentucky legislature to move it from Milford to present-day Richmond. Although the residents of Milford strongly opposed the move, the county approved the transfer in March 1798. On July 4, 1798, the new town was named Richmond in honor of Miller's Virginia birthplace. Richmond was incorporated in 1809.

Kentucky was a southern border state during the Civil War and remained mostly in the Union, even though early in the war, 68 of 110 Kentucky counties seceded to join the Confederacy; however, the state largely came back under U.S. control after early 1862. On August 30, 1862, the Battle of Richmond took place. Confederate General Edmund Kirby Smith routed the Union General William Nelson, capturing or killing 5,300 of his 6,500 men. One historian called this battle "the nearest thing to a Cannae ever scored by any general, North or South, in the course of the whole war."

In 1906, Eastern Kentucky State Normal School was founded in Richmond to train teachers. The school graduated its first class of 11 teachers in 1909. In 1922, it was established as a four-year college and in 1935 added a graduate degree program. In 1965, the institution was renamed Eastern Kentucky University.

In the late 1990s and early 2000s, Richmond had significant growth, becoming the state's seventh-largest city in 2009.

== Geography ==
Richmond is located in Madison County in the Bluegrass region of the state. The Blue Grass Army Depot lies to the southeast of the city. The city is served by Interstate 75, U.S. Routes 25 and 421, and Kentucky Routes 52, 169 and 388. I-75 runs to the west of downtown, with access from exits 83, 87, and 90. Via I-75, downtown Lexington, Kentucky is 25 mi (40 km) northwest, and Knoxville, Tennessee is 147 mi (237 km) south. U.S. Route 25 forms the eastern bypass around the city, leading northwest to Lexington and south 14 mi (23 km) to Berea. U.S. Route 421 parallels U.S. 25 on the eastern bypass of the city, leading northwest to Lexington (with U.S. 25 and I-75) and southeast 34 mi (55 km) to McKee.

According to the United States Census Bureau, the city has a total area of 19.2 square miles (50 km^{2}), of which 19.1 square miles (49 km^{2}) is land and 0.1 square miles (0.26 km^{2})(0.73%) is water.

=== Climate ===
The climate in this area is characterized by hot, humid summers and generally mild to cool winters. According to the Köppen Climate Classification system, Richmond has a humid subtropical climate, abbreviated "Cfa" on climate maps.

== Demographics ==
Historical population
Census	Pop.	Note	%±
1800	110		—
1810	366		232.7%
1830	947		—
1840	822		−13.2%
1850	411		−50.0%
1860	845		105.6%
1870	1,629		92.8%
1880	2,909		78.6%
1890	5,073		74.4%
1900	4,653		−8.3%
1910	5,340		14.8%
1920	5,622		5.3%
1930	6,495		15.5%
1940	7,335		12.9%
1950	10,268		40.0%
1960	12,168		18.5%
1970	16,861		38.6%
1980	21,705		28.7%
1990	21,155		−2.5%
2000	27,152		28.3%
2010	31,364		15.5%
2020	34,585		10.3%
2025 (est.)	40,663		17.6%
U.S. Decennial Census

=== 2020 census ===
As of the 2020 census, Richmond had a population of 34,585. The median age was 29.1 years. 18.2% of residents were under the age of 18 and 11.7% of residents were 65 years of age or older. For every 100 females there were 91.0 males, and for every 100 females age 18 and over there were 89.0 males age 18 and over.

96.4% of residents lived in urban areas, while 3.6% lived in rural areas.

There were 14,294 households in Richmond, of which 25.6% had children under the age of 18 living in them. Of all households, 30.8% were married-couple households, 25.0% were households with a male householder and no spouse or partner present, and 33.5% were households with a female householder and no spouse or partner present. About 37.4% of all households were made up of individuals and 10.2% had someone living alone who was 65 years of age or older.

There were 15,899 housing units, of which 10.1% were vacant. The homeowner vacancy rate was 2.3% and the rental vacancy rate was 9.9%.

Racial composition as of the 2020 census
Race	Number	Percent
White	27,961	80.8%
Black or African American	2,603	7.5%
American Indian and Alaska Native	102	0.3%
Asian	496	1.4%
Native Hawaiian and Other Pacific Islander	30	0.1%
Some other race	631	1.8%
Two or more races	2,762	8.0%
Hispanic or Latino (of any race)	1,470	4.3%

=== 2000 census ===
As of the census of 2000, there were 27,152 people, 10,795 households, and 5,548 families residing in the city. The population density was 1,420.4 inhabitants per square mile (548.4/km^{2}). There were 11,857 housing units at an average density of 620.3 per square mile (239.5/km^{2}). The racial makeup of the city was 88.30% White, 8.27% African American, 0.29% Native American, 1.09% Asian, 0.03% Pacific Islander, 0.43% from other races, and 1.58% from two or more races. Hispanic or Latino of any race were 1.21% of the population.

There were 13,351 households, out of which 24.4% had children under the age of 18 living with them, 35.2% were married couples living together, 12.8% had a female householder with no husband present, and 48.6% were non-families. 34.7% of all households were made up of individuals, and 8.8% had someone living alone who was 65 years of age or older. The average household size was 2.14 and the average family size was 2.78.

In the city, the population was spread out, with 17.5% under the age of 18, 31.7% from 18 to 24, 27.5% from 25 to 44, 13.8% from 45 to 64, and 9.5% who were 65 years of age or older. The median age was 25 years. For every 100 females, there were 90.4 males. For every 100 females age 18 and over, there were 87.8 males.

=== Income ===
The median household income in Richmond was $63,295 as of 2023.

== Government ==
Richmond is a home-rule class city, and operates under a council–manager government. The citizens elect a mayor and four city commissioners who form the Board of Commissioners. The Board of Commissioners is the legislative body of the city government and represents the interests of the citizens when applicable. The Board of Commissioners appoints a city manager, who administers the day-to-day operations of the city.

The mayor is elected for a term of four years. Each city commissioner is elected for a term of two years. The term of the city manager is indefinite.

== Education ==
Richmond is served by the Madison County Public School System. In 1988 the Richmond Independent School District merged into the Madison County school district. Below are the schools found in the Richmond Area that are part of Madison County Schools.

Elementary schools

- Daniel Boone Elementary School
- Glenn Marshall Elementary School
- Kit Carson Elementary School
- Madison Kindergarten Academy
- White Hall Elementary School

Middle schools

- Madison Middle School
- B. Michael Caudill Middle School
- Clark Moores Middle School

=== High schools ===
- Model Laboratory School (Associated with Eastern Kentucky University)
- Madison Central High School

=== Ignite Academy ===
- Ignite Academy North

=== Higher education ===
- Eastern Kentucky University

=== Public library ===
Richmond has a lending library, a branch of the Madison County Public Library.

== Media ==
=== Newspaper ===
The Richmond Register is published on Tuesday through Saturday publication. The Eastern Progress is a weekly student publication of Eastern Kentucky University.

=== Radio stations ===
- WEKY (1340 AM)
- WCBR (1110 AM)
- WEKU (88.9 FM)
- WLXX (101.5 FM)

== Transportation ==
=== Roads ===
Interstate 75 passes through western Richmond, and connects the city to Lexington in the north and Knoxville, Tennessee in the south. I-75 has three exits in the city: U.S. Route 25, State Route 876, and S.R. 2872.

Richmond is located on a concurrency with U.S. Route 25 and 421. The two routes run north to Lexington and diverge approximately five miles south of the city. U.S. 25 connects the city to Berea and Mount Vernon in the south. U.S. 421 connects to McKee in the south east.

State Route 52 connects to Lancaster in the west and Irvine in the east. State Route 169 heads northwest toward Nicholasville. State Route 388 runs north of the city to the north end of the county and Boonesborough. State Route 876 serves as a bypass around the business district of the city and heads west toward Kentucky Route 595, which continues to Round Hill and Kirksville. State Route 1156 heads northeast and connects with State Route 169 at Valley View. State Route 1986 runs northeast of Richmond to Union City and Doylesville. The U.S. 25 connector, signed as S.R. 2872 and commonly known as Duncannon Lane, connects I-75 to U.S. 25 south of the city. State Route 2881 connects at State Route 52 at Caleast, runs through southern Richmond, and heads south to Berea.

=== Air ===
Central Kentucky Regional Airport is a public airport located in Madison County between Richmond and Berea. It consists of a 5,001 by 100 ft asphalt runway.

=== Bus ===
Foothills Express, operated by the Kentucky River Foothills Development Council, provides the Richmond Transit Service bus service within Richmond, the Big E Transit Service on the EKU campus, Madison County Connector service to Berea, and local and intercity demand-responsive transport.

=== Railroad ===
CSX Railroad operates a north–south rail line through Richmond, which also serves the Bluegrass Army Depot, near the southern part of the city.

== Notable people ==
- Daniel Boone (November 2, 1734 – September 26, 1820), born in Birdsboro, Pennsylvania; he was an American pioneer who established Fort Boonesborough, in Madison County, Kentucky along the Kentucky River
- Kit Carson, pioneer frontiersman, born near Richmond in Madison County, Kentucky, but grew up in Franklin, Missouri
- Brutus J. Clay II, son of Cassius M. Clay and Minister to Switzerland
- Cassius Marcellus Clay, planter, abolitionist and politician; Minister to Spain and Russia, a founder of the Republican Party
- Earle Combs, New York Yankees player, Baseball Hall of Fame member; longtime resident of the area
- David R. Francis, Mayor of St. Louis, Governor of Missouri and U.S. Secretary of the Interior; born in Richmond
- Odon Guitar, brigadier general in the Union Missouri State Militia in the American Civil War
- Leigh Ann Hester of the Kentucky Army National Guard, first woman in United States military history to be cited for valor in close quarters combat, for action near Salman Pak, Iraq on March 20, 2005; she is the first woman to receive the Silver Star Medal for valor in combat
- Keen Johnson, editor of the Richmond Daily Register (1925–39); Lieutenant Governor of Kentucky (1935–39); Governor of Kentucky (1939–43); Undersecretary of Labor (1946–47); longtime resident of the area.
- James B. McCreary, United States Senator and two-term Governor of Kentucky
- Samuel Freeman Miller, U.S. Supreme Court Justice
- Fiddlin' Doc Roberts (April 26, 1897 – August 4, 1978), old-time bluegrass fiddler
- Jimmy Stokley (October 18, 1943 – August 13, 1985), lead singer, co-founder and member of the band Exile
- Samuel Hanson Stone, Kentucky politician, born near Richmond
- William J. Stone, Governor of Missouri, born near Richmond
- Montez Sweat, NFL player (2019-)
- Ken Upchurch, member of the Kentucky House of Representatives from Wayne County; born in Richmond in 1969
- Larry Warford, NFL offensive lineman (1991-)
- John Reid Wolfskill, a Mexican American pioneer in California

== See also ==
- Other places named Richmond
