= Kentucky Route 1295 =

State highway in Kentucky, United States

Kentucky Route 1295
- Kirksville Road, Moran Mill Road
- KY 1295 highlighted in red

Route information
- Maintained by KYTC
- Length: 11.501 mi (18.509 km)

Major junctions
- West end: KY 52 near Hyattesville
- East end: KY 52 / Hagan Mill Road near Richmond

Location
- Country: United States
- State: Kentucky
- Counties: Garrard, Madison

Highway system
- Kentucky State Highway System; Interstate; US; State; Parkways
← KY 1294	→ KY 1296

Kentucky Route 1295 (KY 1295) is an 11.501-mile-long (18.509 km) state highway in Kentucky that runs from Kentucky Route 52 immediately southwest of Hyattsville to Kentucky Route 52 again southwest of Richmond. It serves Hyattsville and Kirksville. It is mainly used as a time saver for traffic between Richmond and Lancaster. It is notorious among locals as being a very dangerous highway as many accidents have occurred on that highway. It is known as Moran Mill Road in Madison County, and Kirksville Road in Garrard County.

== Major intersections ==
County	Location	mi	km	Destinations	Notes
Garrard		0.000	0.000	KY 52	Western terminus
Garrard		0.769	1.238	KY 563 north (Perry Rodgers Road)	Southern terminus of KY 563
Garrard		4.464	7.184	KY 1131 west (Nina Ridge Road)	Eastern terminus of KY 1131
Madison	Kirksville	8.388	13.499	KY 595 (Kirksville Road)	
Madison		11.501	18.509	KY 52 (Lancaster Road)	Eastern terminus
1.000 mi = 1.609 km; 1.000 km = 0.621 mi
