= Kentucky Route 620 =

State highway in Scott County, Kentucky, U.S.

Kentucky Route 620
- KY 620 highlighted in red

Route information
- Maintained by KYTC
- Length: 20.577 mi (33.115 km)

Major junctions
- West end: US 62 in Georgetown
- I-75 near Delaplain
- East end: US 25 near Rogers Gap

Location
- Country: United States
- State: Kentucky
- Counties: Scott

Highway system
- Kentucky State Highway System; Interstate; US; State; Parkways
← KY 619	→ KY 621

Kentucky Route 620 (KY 620) is a 19.3-mile-long (31.1 km) state highway in Scott County that runs from U.S. Route 62 (US 62) in far northwestern Georgetown adjacent to Toyota Motor Manufacturing Kentucky to U.S. Route 25 (US 25) and Harbor Village Drive west of Rogers Gap via Delaplain, Biddle, Double Culvert, Turkey Foot, and Rogers Gap. The road ended at KY 3487 and Delaplain Road until August 5, 2021, when the road was extended along the entire length of KY 3487 to US 62.

== Major intersections ==
The entire route is in Scott County.

Location	mi	km	Destinations	Notes
Georgetown	0.000	0.000	US 62	Western terminus
	2.781– 2.837	4.476– 4.566	I-75 – Lexington, Cincinnati	I-75 exit 129
	3.410	5.488	US 25 north (Cincinnati Road) / KY 1143 south (McClelland Circle)	West end of US 25 overlap
	3.650	5.874	US 25 south (Cincinnati Road)	East end of US 25 overlap
	4.727	7.607	KY 1143 (McClelland Circle)	
Biddle	9.746	15.685	KY 1636 north (Indian Creek Road)	Southern terminus of KY 1636
Double Culvert	12.772– 12.781	20.555– 20.569	US 25 (Cincinnati Road)	
	16.788	27.018	KY 922 south (Muddy Ford Road)	Northern terminus of KY 922
	20.577	33.115	US 25 (Cincinnati Road) / Harbor Village Drive	Eastern terminus; continues as Harbor Village Drive beyond US 25
1.000 mi = 1.609 km; 1.000 km = 0.621 mi: Concurrency terminus
