= Kentucky Route 2872 =

State highway in Kentucky, United States

Kentucky Route 2872
- Duncannon Lane
- KY 2872 highlighted in red

Route information
- Maintained by KYTC
- Length: 4.3 mi (6.9 km)

Location
- Country: United States
- State: Kentucky

Highway system
- Kentucky State Highway System; Interstate; US; State; Parkways
← KY 2871	→ KY 2873

Kentucky Route 2872 (KY 2872) is a 4.3-mile-long (6.9 km) state highway entirely within Madison County in the U.S. state of Kentucky. The road is known as Duncannon Lane for its entire length and has an interchange with Interstate 75 (I-75) at exit 83.

== Major intersections ==
The entire route is in Richmond, Madison County.

mi	km	Destinations	Notes
0.0	0.0	KY 2881 (Caleast Road) – Central Kentucky Regional Airport	Western terminus
0.6	0.97	I-75 – Lexington, Knoxville	I-75 exit 83
4.3	6.9	US 421 / US 25 (Berea Road)	Eastern terminus
1.000 mi = 1.609 km; 1.000 km = 0.621 mi
