= Hyattsville, Kentucky =

Unincorporated community in Kentucky, United States

- Unincorporated community
- Location within the state of Kentucky Hyattsville (the United States)
- Coordinates: 37°36′18″N 84°31′21″W
- Country: United States
- State: Kentucky
- County: Garrard
- Elevation: 1,040 ft (320 m)
- Time zone: UTC-5 (Eastern (EST))
  - Summer (DST): UTC-4 (EDT)
- GNIS feature ID: 508302

Hyattsville is an unincorporated community in Garrard County, Kentucky, United States. It lies along Routes 52 and 1295 east of the city of Lancaster, the county seat of Garrard County. Its elevation is 1,040 feet (317 m).

A post office in the community was operational from 1869 to 1917. Hyattsville was named after Allen Hiatt, the original owner of the town site.
