= Kentucky Route 49 =

State highway in Kentucky, United States

Kentucky Route 49
- KY 49 highlighted in red

Route information
- Maintained by KYTC
- Length: 57 mi (92 km)

Major junctions
- West end: US 150 in Bardstown
- US 68 in Lebanon
- East end: KY 70 in Liberty

Location
- Country: United States
- State: Kentucky
- Counties: Nelson, Marion, Casey,

Highway system
- Kentucky State Highway System; Interstate; US; State; Parkways
← KY 48	→ US 51

Kentucky Route 49 (KY 49) is a 57-mile-long (92 km) state highway in the U.S. state of Kentucky.

== Route description ==
KY 49 begins at an intersection with U.S. Route 150 (US 150) in Bardstown and travels south towards Loretto. It then heads east-southeast concurrent with KY 52 to Lebanon. It splits with KY 52 in Lebanon and goes southeast to Bradfordsville. After that, it terminates in Liberty, at an intersection with KY 70.

== History ==
The road has seen improvements from Bradfordsville to Lebanon in recent years which has made the corridor safer and less curvy.

The Kentucky Route 49 Bridge is located in Bradfordsville and spans the Rolling Fork River. It is the oldest Whipple-Murphy bridge in Kentucky.

== Major intersections ==
County	Location	mi	km	Destinations	Notes
Casey	Liberty	0.000	0.000	KY 70 Bus. (Campbellsville Street)	Southern terminus
Casey	Liberty	0.114	0.183	Hustonville Street (KY 2314 north)	Southern terminus of KY 2314
Casey		2.551	4.105	KY 1552 east (Brush Creek Road)	Western terminus of KY 1552
Casey		8.008	12.888	KY 1547 south	Northern terminus of KY 1547
Casey		11.337	18.245	KY 78 east (Bradfordsville Road)	Western terminus of KY 78
Marion	Bradfordsville	21.179	34.084	KY 337 north (East Main Street) – Gravel Switch	Southern end of KY 337 overlap
Marion		22.424	36.088	KY 337 south (Mannsville Road)	Northern end of KY 337 overlap
Marion		23.053	37.100	KY 1157 west	Eastern terminus of KY 1157
Marion	Lebanon	29.696	47.791	KY 3321 west (Country Club Drive) – National Cemetery, Metts Drive Industrial Park	Eastern terminus of KY 3321
Marion	Lebanon	30.323	48.800	US 68 / KY 52 west (West Main Street) – Campbellsville, Perryville	South end of KY 52 overlap; 68 both ways, 52 to the east
Marion	Lebanon	30.604	49.252	KY 55 north (West Walnut Street) – Springfield	South end of KY 55 overlap
Marion	Lebanon	30.757	49.499	KY 55 south (West Walnut Street) – Campbellsville, Columbia	North end of KY 55 overlap
Marion		31.686	50.994	KY 2154 (Veterans Memorial Highway)	
Marion		31.792	51.164	KY 84 west (St Mary's Road) – St. Mary, Marion Adjustment Center	Eastern terminus of KY 84
Marion		35.923	57.812	KY 327 south – St. Mary	Northern terminus of KY 327
Marion		37.243	59.937	KY 52 east – Historic Landmark Maker's Mark Distillery	North end of KY 52 overlap
Marion	Loretto	40.026	64.416	KY 52 west	South end of KY 52 overlap
Marion	Loretto	40.566	65.285	KY 52 east	East end of KY 52 overlap
Marion		41.757	67.201	KY 152 east – Sisters of Loretto Motherhouse Nerinx	Western terminus of KY 152
Marion		43.888	70.631	KY 1183 east (Manton Road)	Western terminus of KY 1183
Marion	Holy Cross	46.762	75.256	KY 457 south (New Haven Road)	Northern terminus of KY 457
Marion	Holy Cross	46.812	75.337	KY 527 south (St. Francis-Holy Cross Road)	Northern terminus of KY 527
Nelson		49.444	79.572	KY 46 west (Balltown Road) – Bardstown	Eastern terminus of KY 46
Nelson		50.695	81.586	KY 2735 south (Roberts Road)	Northern terminus of KY 2735
Nelson		53.224	85.656	KY 2735 (Roberts Road)	
Nelson	Bardstown	56.908	91.585	US 150 (Springfield Avenue/East Stephen Foster Avenue) to US 62 / Bluegrass Parkway – Springfield, Mt. Washington, Elizabethtown, My Old Kentucky Home State Park	Northern terminus; 62 and state park to the west, parkway to the east
1.000 mi = 1.609 km; 1.000 km = 0.621 mi: Concurrency terminus
