= Kentucky Route 595 =

State highway in Kentucky, United States

Kentucky Route 595
- KY 595 highlighted in red

Route information
- Maintained by KYTC
- Length: 24.653 mi (39.675 km)

Major junctions
- South end: KY 1617 near Berea
- US 25 in Berea; I-75 near Berea; KY 52 south of Kirksville
- North end: Poosey Ridge Road in rural Madison County

Location
- Country: United States
- State: Kentucky
- Counties: Madison

Highway system
- Kentucky State Highway System; Interstate; US; State; Parkways
← KY 594	→ KY 596

Kentucky Route 595 is a north- south route running through Madison County, Kentucky, United States. Its northern terminus is at the Kentucky River near Valley View and it southern terminus is at the intersection of Kentucky Route 1617 2 miles south of Berea. From the northern terminus to its intersection with Kentucky Route 876 it follows Silver Creek.

== Route description ==
From the intersection with Kentucky Route 876 it passes through the communities of Round Hill and Kirksville. Four miles south of Kirksville its meets up with Kentucky Route 52 for a mile east until Happy Landing and then it turns towards Berea going through Buggytown along the way. Upon entering Berea it intersects with Interstate 75, then intersects with Kentucky Route 956 (Berea Bypass) and Mayde Road. Kentucky Route 595 turns at the light onto Walnut Meadow Pike on into Berea, passing by the Artisan Center and Berea Community Schools and though Berea. At the center of Berea it meets with US Route 25 and Kentucky Route 21. After that, it becomes Scaffald Cane Road and runs two more miles before ending at Kentucky Route 1617. Kentucky Route 1617 maintains Scaffald Cane Road until its end with US Route 25 in Rockcastle County. Future extensions are aspired and KYTC will expand it to freeway and end somewhere and turn and overlap with other highways and have exits and intersections from its current end.

== Major intersections ==
The entire route is in Madison County.

Location	mi	km	Destinations	Notes
Berea	0.000	0.000	KY 1617	
Berea	2.321	3.735	KY 21	
Berea	2.397	3.858	US 25	
Berea	3.745	6.027	KY 1983 north	
Berea	4.471	7.195	KY 956 west	
Berea	4.811	7.743	I-75	I-75 exit 77
Berea	5.005	8.055	KY 2874	
	10.785	17.357	KY 52 east	South end of KY 52 overlap
KY 595 mileage not counted along KY 52
	10.785	17.357	KY 52 west	North end of KY 52 overlap
Kirksville	12.820	20.632	KY 1295	
	16.063	25.851	KY 876	
	24.653	39.675	Poosey Ridge Road	End state maintenance
1.000 mi = 1.609 km; 1.000 km = 0.621 mi: Concurrency terminus
