= Richmond–Berea micropolitan area =

Richmond–Berea Micropolitan Area
- Micropolitan Statistical Area
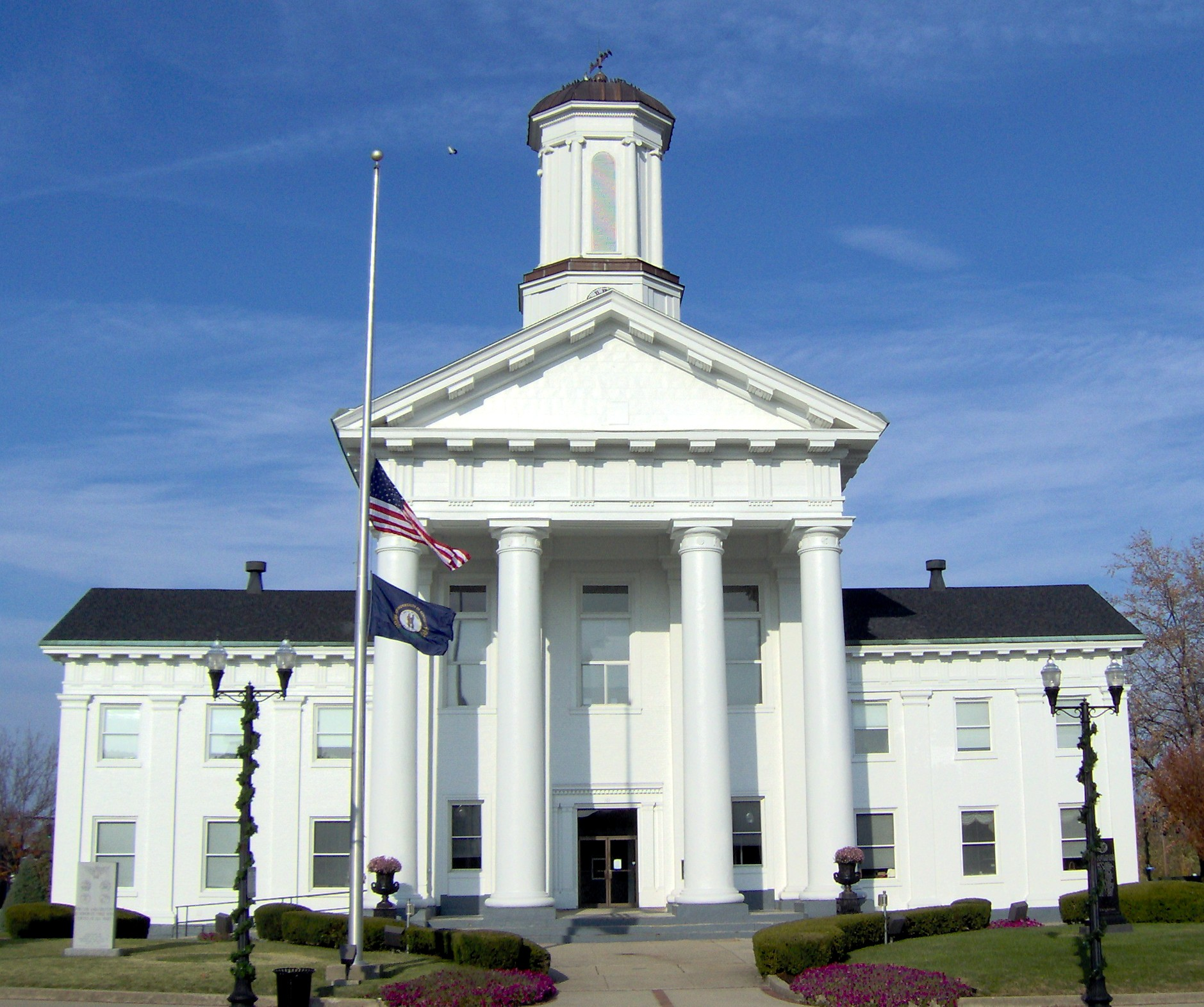
- Madison County courthouse, Richmond, with flags at half-staff in honor of Veterans Day (2007).
Map of Lexington-Fayette–Frankfort–Richmond, KY CSA
City of Richmond
City of Berea
Richmond–Berea µSA
Other Counties in the Lexington, KY CSA
- Country: United States
- State: Kentucky
- Largest city: Lexington

Area
  - MSA: 1,484.07 sq mi (3,843.7 km^{2})

Population (2020)
  - Total: 516,811 ▲(109th)
- Time zone: UTC−5 (EST)
  - Summer (DST): UTC−4 (EDT)
- Area codes: 859, 502

The Richmond-Berea Micropolitan Statistical Area, as defined by the United States Census Bureau, is an area consisting of two counties in Kentucky, anchored by the cities of Richmond and Berea. As of the 2000 census, the μSA had a population of 87,454 (though a July 1, 2019 estimate placed the population at 107,093). The Richmond-Berea Micropolitan Statistical Area is part of the Lexington-Fayette–Richmond–Frankfort combined statistical area.

== Counties ==
- Madison
- Rockcastle

== Communities ==
=== Incorporated places ===
- Berea (Principal city)
- Brodhead
- Livingston
- Mount Vernon
- Richmond (Principal city)

=== Unincorporated places ===
- Bighill
- Boonesborough
- Bybee
- Kirksville
- Waco
- Valley View
- Doylesville

== Demographics ==
As of the census of 2000, there were 87,454 people, 33,696 households, and 22,982 families residing within the μSA. The racial makeup of the μSA was 94.41% White, 3.65% African American, 0.27% Native American, 0.61% Asian, 0.02% Pacific Islander, 0.28% from other races, and 1.08% from two or more races. Hispanic or Latino of any race were 0.90% of the population.

The median income for a household in the μSA was $28,168, and the median income for a family was $35,831. Males had a median income of $29,372 versus $20,438 for females. The per capita income for the μSA was $14,564.

== See also ==
- Kentucky census statistical areas
