= Kentucky Route 956 =

Highway in Kentucky, United States

Kentucky Route 956

Route information
- Maintained by KYTC
- Length: 1.383 mi (2.226 km)

Major junctions
- West end: KY 595 north of Berea
- East end: US 25 north of Berea

Location
- Country: United States
- State: Kentucky
- Counties: Madison

Highway system
- Kentucky State Highway System; Interstate; US; State; Parkways

Kentucky Route 956 (KY 956) is a state secondary highway in Madison County, Kentucky, United States, located north of Berea. At just under 1 1/2 miles (2.4 km) in length, KY 956 serves as a connector between Interstate 75 (I-75) and U.S. Route 25 (US 25).

== Route description ==
KY 956 begins at an intersection with Kentucky Route 595 and Mayde Road, just east of exit 77 of I-75. KY 956 travels east one half-mile (0.80 km) before crossing a CSX Transportation line. Two-tenths of a mile (0.32 km) later, the road intersects Menelaus Road, which carries Kentucky Route 1983, a rural secondary highway. From Menelaus Road, KY 956 travels another 3/4 mile (1.2 km) to reach its eastern end at US 25.

== Major intersections ==
The entire route is in Berea, Madison County.

mi	km	Destinations	Notes
0.000	0.000	KY 595 (Walnut Meadow Road) to I-75 / Mayde Road	
0.466	0.750	KY 1983 (Menelaus Road)	
1.383	2.226	US 25 (Richmond Road)	
1.000 mi = 1.609 km; 1.000 km = 0.621 mi
