= Round Hill, Kentucky =

Unincorporated community in Kentucky, United States

Coordinates: 37°40′44″N 84°24′58″W

- Archeological Site 15 Ma 24
- U.S. National Register of Historic Places
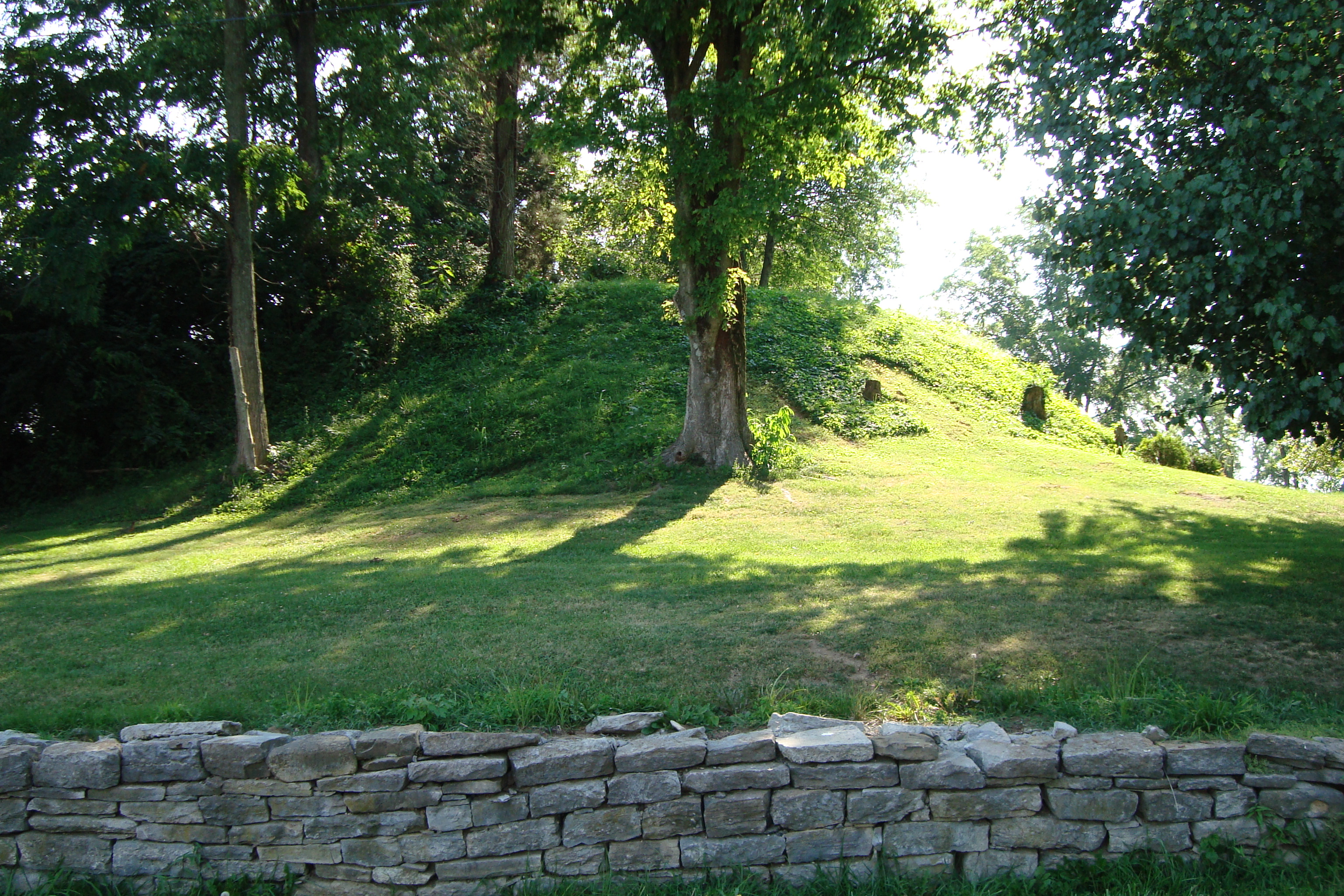
- Adena Mound at Round Hill, Kentucky

- Location within Kentucky Location within the United States
- Nearest city: Round Hill, Kentucky
- Area: 0.2 acres (0.081 ha)
- NRHP reference No.: 80001651
- Added to NRHP: August 18, 1980

Round Hill is an unincorporated community in Madison County, Kentucky, United States. It lies 10 miles southwest of Richmond on Kentucky Route 595. Round Hill is part of the Richmond–Berea Micropolitan Statistical Area.

A burial mound attributed by the National Register of Historic Places to the Adena culture is the central feature of the village. The ovoid earthwork has a base of roughly 150 by 90 feet and a height of 25 feet. Unsystematic excavations in the early twentieth century by local residents produced flint tools and human remains. The mound stands on private property but is visible from the road.
