= Bighill, Kentucky =

Unincorporated community in Kentucky, United States

- Unincorporated community
- Location within Kentucky Location within the United States
- Coordinates: 37°33′16″N 84°12′30″W
- Country: United States
- State: Kentucky
- County: Madison
- Elevation: 801 ft (244 m)
- Time zone: UTC-5 (Eastern (EST))
  - Summer (DST): UTC-4 (EDT)
- ZIP code: 40405
- GNIS feature ID: 510711

Bighill is an unincorporated community located in Madison County, Kentucky, United States. It lies east of Berea at the junction of Kentucky Route 21 and U.S. Route 421. The community is part of the Richmond–Berea Micropolitan Statistical Area.

== History ==
Bighill, Kentucky was involved in the Civil War.
