= Kentucky Route 21 =

State highway in Kentucky, United States

Kentucky Route 21

Route information
- Maintained by KYTC
- Length: 17.284 mi (27.816 km)

Major junctions
- West end: KY 52 near Paint Lick
- I-75 in Berea; US 25 in Berea; US 421 in Bighill
- East end: Jackson County line

Location
- Country: United States
- State: Kentucky
- Counties: Madison

Highway system
- Kentucky State Highway System; Interstate; US; State; Parkways
← KY 20	→ KY 22

Kentucky Route 21 (KY 21) is a 14.196-mile (22.846 km) west–east highway in Madison County, running from the Garrard County line near Paint Lick to Bighill, east of Berea.

It begins at KY 52 at the Garrard County line at the Paint Lick Creek Bridge. The road passes through Wallaceton and traverses over Interstate 75 in Berea, where KY 21 shortly runs along with US 25. After US 25 breaks away and goes north toward the Blue Grass Army Depot, KY 21 continues to the east and intersects US 421 in Bighill before ending at the Jackson County line.

== Route description ==
KY 21 begins at an intersection with KY 52 near Paint Lick in Madison County, heading southeast as two-lane undivided Paint Lick Road. The road passes through farmland with some trees and homes, curving south before heading back to the southeast. The route continues south and then southeast through more rural areas and comes to an intersection with the eastern terminus of KY 954. Following this, KY 21 heads east into wooded areas with some fields and residences, curving to the northeast. The road heads into Berea and enters commercial areas, curving east and coming to an interchange with I-75, at which point it is five lanes wide with a center left-turn lane. Past this interchange, the route becomes Chestnut Street and becomes a four-lane divided highway, intersecting US 25.

At this point, US 25 joins KY 21 for a concurrency and the two routes pass through residential areas as a two-lane undivided road. The road passes over a CSX railroad line and heads northeast into the downtown area of Berea before it passes more homes. KY 21 splits from US 25 by heading east on Prospect Street and immediately intersects KY 595. The road runs through more residential areas with some businesses and curves to the southeast. The route becomes Big Hill Road and curves east to leave Berea, heading through farmland with some homes and crossing KY 1617. KY 21 turns to the southeast and continues east through dense forests with some fields and residences. The route continues east to US 421 in Bighill, where it turns south to form a short concurrency with that route on McKee Road before heading east on Owsley Fork Road. KY 21 passes through more farmland and woodland and winds southeast to its eastern terminus at the county line between Madison County and Jackson County.

== Major intersections ==
The entire route is in Madison County.

Location	mi	km	Destinations	Notes
	0.000	0.000	KY 52	
	6.176	9.939	KY 954 west (Cartersville Road) – Cartersville, Maywoods	
Berea	8.596	13.834	I-75 – Lexington, Knoxville	I-75 exit 76
Berea	9.115	14.669	US 25 south (Mt. Vernon Road)	West end of US 25 overlap
Berea	10.062	16.193	US 25 north (Chestnut Street)	East end of US 25 overlap
Berea	10.098	16.251	KY 595 (Scaffold Cane Road)	
Berea	12.013	19.333	KY 1617 (Blue Lick Road / Gabbardtown Road)	
Bighill	15.143	24.370	US 421 north	West end of US 421 overlap
Bighill	15.308	24.636	US 421 south	East end of US 421 overlap
	17.284	27.816	Jackson County line	
1.000 mi = 1.609 km; 1.000 km = 0.621 mi
