= Delaplain, Kentucky =

Unincorporated community in Kentucky, United States

Delaplain
- Unincorporated community
- Location within the state of Kentucky Delaplain (the United States)
- Coordinates: 37°20′6″N 84°32′55″W
- Country: United States
- State: Kentucky
- County: Scott
- Elevation: 869 ft (265 m)
- Time zone: UTC-5 (Eastern (EST))
  - Summer (DST): UTC-4 (EDT)
- GNIS feature ID: 490791

Delaplain is an unincorporated community located in Scott County, Kentucky, United States.
