= Kentucky Route 876 =

State highway in Kentucky, United States

Kentucky Route 876
- Eastern Bypass or The Bypass (locally)

Route information
- Maintained by KYTC
- Length: 9.959 mi (16.027 km)

Major junctions
- West end: KY 595 west of Richmond
- I-75 in Richmond
- East end: US 25 / US 421 in Richmond

Location
- Country: United States
- State: Kentucky
- Counties: Madison

Highway system
- Kentucky State Highway System; Interstate; US; State; Parkways
← KY 875	→ KY 877

Kentucky Route 876 (KY 876) is a 10-mile-long (16 km) state highway in the Richmond, Kentucky area. The western terminus of the route is at KY 595 southeast of Cottonburg. The eastern terminus is at U.S. Route 25 (US 25) and US 421 in Richmond.

== Route description ==
The route starts at KY 595 (Kirksville Road) and heads east as the two-lane Barnes Mill Road. Just before it crosses Interstate 75 (I-75) at exit 87, KY 876 widens to four lanes and becomes the Eastern Kentucky University (EKU) Bypass (Eastern Bypass). Now in Richmond, the bypass turns to the east-southeast at KY 52 (Lancaster Avenue) before resuming an easterly progression at Boggs Lane. Past Boggs, the route makes a slight northward arc to its eastern terminus at US 25 and US 421. In previous years, KY 876 ran concurrently with US 25 and US 421 to the intersection with KY 52 east of Richmond.

== History ==
Prior to the construction of the Dr. Robert R. Martin By-Pass, an extension of the Eastern By-Pass around eastern and northern Richmond, KY 876 ended at KY 52 (East Main Street). When the new By-Pass opened, US 25 and US 421 were routed onto the new northern bypass between KY 876 and I-75 exit 90, and KY 876 was truncated to the intersection with US 25/US 421.

== Major intersections ==
The entire route is in Madison County.

Location	mi	km	Destinations	Notes
	0.000	0.000	KY 595 (Kirksville Road / Poosey Ridge Road)	
Richmond	7.149	11.505	I-75 – Lexington, Knoxville	Exit 87 (I-75)
Richmond	8.146	13.110	KY 52 (Lancaster Avenue) – Richmond, Lancaster, Eastern Kentucky University	
Richmond	9.959	16.027	US 25 / US 421 (Berea Road) / US 25 Bus. north / US 421 Bus. north (Big Hill Avenue)	
1.000 mi = 1.609 km; 1.000 km = 0.621 mi
