= Buggytown, Kentucky =

Unincorporated community in Kentucky, United States

- Unincorporated community
- Location within Kentucky Location within the United States
- Coordinates: 37°38′8″N 84°22′9″W
- Country: United States
- State: Kentucky
- County: Madison
- Elevation: 919 ft (280 m)
- Time zone: UTC-5 (Eastern (EST))
  - Summer (DST): UTC-4 (EDT)
- GNIS feature ID: 488340

Buggytown is an unincorporated community located in Madison County, Kentucky, United States. It was also called Buckettown and Buggtown. It is located on Kentucky Route 595 northwest of Berea.
