= Kirksville, Kentucky =

Unincorporated community in Kentucky, United States

- Unincorporated community
- Location within Kentucky Location within the United States
- Coordinates: 37°39′55″N 84°24′33″W
- Country: United States
- State: Kentucky
- County: Madison
- Elevation: 984 ft (300 m)
- Time zone: UTC-5 (Eastern (EST))
  - Summer (DST): UTC-4 (EDT)
- GNIS feature ID: 495804

Kirksville is an unincorporated community located in Madison County, Kentucky, United States. It was formerly known as Centerville; the new name honored local store owner Samuel Kirkendall. It is located at the junction of Kentucky Route 595 and Kentucky Route 1295.
