= Valley View, Kentucky =

Unincorporated community in Kentucky, United States

- Unincorporated community
- Location within Kentucky Location within the United States
- Coordinates: 37°50′46″N 84°25′50″W
- Country: United States
- State: Kentucky
- County: Madison
- Elevation: 577 ft (176 m)
- Time zone: UTC-5 (Eastern (EST))
  - Summer (DST): UTC-4 (EDT)
- GNIS feature ID: 505950

Valley View is an unincorporated community in Madison County, Kentucky, United States. The community is part of the Richmond–Berea Micropolitan Statistical Area. It is located at the junction of Kentucky Route 169 and Kentucky Route 1156. It is the location of the Valley View Ferry. Valley View, Kentucky, is a quiet village in Madison County, located approximately 14 miles northwest of Richmond, Kentucky, along KY-168 at the mouth of Tate's Creek. The name “Valley View” is believed to come from the top hill of the Fayette County side of the river.

== Early life ==
Valley View started with the establishment of the Valley View Ferry in 1784. The ferry is the oldest continuously operating business in Kentucky, founded by John Craig under perpetual license from the Virginia assembly. The ferry remained privately owned for over 200 years. Before, the ferry charged a fee for passengers, but now the toll has been removed to encourage Kentucky residents to use the ferry. Captain Will Horn, who has operated the ferry for eight years, explains that there has been a 25-30% increase in passengers since dropping the admission fee.

For more than 200 years, the Valley View Ferry has carried people across the Kentucky River and, in 1998, received $200,000 in renovations to keep it running in the future. The renovation, which started in January, included replacing two 55-foot towers on both sides of the Kentucky River and installing 1,700 feet of cable to guide the ferry across the river. This was important because it had no rudder during its three-minute trips.

== Industrial growth ==
Valley View is home to the oldest business in Kentucky, the Valley View Ferry. Valley View was a popular destination for river excursions, getting passengers' attention on vessels such as Falls City ii and various showboats. Valley View was the final stop for the Falls City ii. After visiting various locations along its route, including High Bridge, the steamboat would dock at the Valley View, its business, before returning and heading to Louisville. Strother Million built Valley View's first house in the mid-19th century near the river. He also operated a general store, which was lost due to flooding in 1889. There were only a few houses and stores for years, but the arrival of the R. N. I. & amp and B railroad in 1888 helped the village grow tremendously. 10 years later, it brought river transportation, passenger and freight rail services, one hotel, one church, three general stores, a post office, two sawmills, and more. The population around this time numbered around 500. By 1890, the Southern Lumber Company, which operated a steam-powered band sawmill three stories high, got its electric light plant and telephone system, which connected the mill, the office, the four boom docks, a store, and the freight depot. The population of the village by this time exceeded 1,000 people. However, in the 1920s, logging decreased, and the depression of the 1930s ended the lumber and railroad business.

== Letters concerning Valley View ==
A letter was sent to Mr. Claude C. Howard, who was involved with getting a historical marker for the Valley View Ferry from W.A Wentworth, the Chairman of the Kentucky Highway Marker Program, regarding establishing Kentucky Marker for the Valley View Ferry. The letter discusses the proposed inscription for the marker, including the suggested changes Mr. Howard gave them. The letter also mentions that Mr. Howard needs to pay $190 to cover the cost of creating the marker. The chairman, W. A Wentworth, ends the letter by stating once they receive his check, they can proceed and move on with everything discussed about the marker. A letter from Hallmark Insurance Company was also sent to Felix Green. This letter is a response regarding Claim No. 30309, which is related to an incident that occurred on March 5, 1975, regarding the loss of cargo involving the Valley View Ferry. The letter mentions some details of the incident. The truck was driven by Lynn Rakoczy, owned by Hery Schooling, and leased by Harry Crawford. The truck was having trouble leaving the ferry, but the truck was already having mechanical issues. The engine would repeatedly stall/die, which would cause it to slide backward. The letter informs Mr. Green that, based on the evidence, the insurance company will not pay for the cause of the cargo loss.

== Transportation challenges ==
As of 2024, there have been ongoing traffic delays caused by 18-wheelers traveling on Tates Creek Road to the Valley View Ferry, even though several signs leading up to the dock prohibit it. Captain Clayton Embly explains that truck drivers rely too much on GPS instead of the road signs themselves. The delays can last up to two hours, and if the issue continues, it will only get worse because of two buildings being constructed on both sides of the river.
