= National Register of Historic Places listings in Garrard County, Kentucky =

Location of Garrard County in Kentucky

This is a list of the National Register of Historic Places listings in Garrard County, Kentucky.

It is intended to be a complete list of the properties and districts on the National Register of Historic Places in Garrard County, Kentucky, United States. The locations of National Register properties and districts for which the latitude and longitude coordinates are included below, may be seen in a map.

There are 67 properties and districts listed on the National Register in the county. Another property was once listed but has been removed.

This National Park Service list is complete through NPS recent listings posted May 2, 2025.

== Current listings ==
| | Name on the Register | Image | Date listed | Location | City or town | Description |
|---|---|---|---|---|---|---|
| 1 | John Arnold House | | June 23, 1983 (#83002777) | Off Kentucky Route 1295; 37°36′45″N 84°28′49″W | Paint Lick | |
| 2 | Billy Ball House | Billy Ball House | March 26, 1984 (#84001434) | 209 Richmond St. 37°37′10″N 84°34′34″W | Lancaster | Log structure built in 1830s; vacant in 1983; may no longer exist. |
| 3 | Barlow House | | June 17, 1985 (#85001276) | Danville Rd. 37°38′08″N 84°36′54″W | Lancaster | |
| 4 | Calvin Blakeman House | | June 17, 1985 (#85001277) | Polly's Bend Rd. 37°48′13″N 84°38′21″W | Lancaster | |
| 5 | Bonta-Owsley House | | June 17, 1985 (#85001278) | Junction of Boone's Creek and Kentucky Route 52; 37°37′53″N 84°37′00″W | Lancaster | |
| 6 | Boyle-Robertson-Letcher House | Boyle-Robertson-Letcher House | April 14, 1975 (#75000761) | 106 W. Maple St. 37°37′15″N 84°34′47″W | Lancaster | |
| 7 | Gov. William O. Bradley House | Gov. William O. Bradley House | November 5, 1974 (#74000876) | Lexington St. 37°37′19″N 84°34′41″W | Lancaster | |
| 8 | Bryantsville Methodist Church | Bryantsville Methodist Church | June 17, 1985 (#85001279) | U.S. Route 27; 37°42′48″N 84°39′03″W | Lancaster | |
| 9 | Bryantsville Post Office and Store | | June 17, 1985 (#85001280) | Off U.S. Route 27; 37°42′46″N 84°39′00″W | Bryantsville | |
| 10 | Calico & Brown General Store | Calico & Brown General Store | June 17, 1985 (#85001281) | Kentucky Route 52; 37°37′02″N 84°24′30″W | Paint Lick | |
| 11 | Dalton House | | June 17, 1985 (#85001282) | Kentucky Route 39; 37°35′36″N 84°34′21″W | Lancaster | |
| 12 | Denny Place | Denny Place | March 26, 1984 (#84001439) | 217 Lexington St. 37°37′25″N 84°34′43″W | Lancaster | |
| 13 | Dunn-Watkins House | | June 17, 1985 (#85001283) | Danville Rd. 37°37′54″N 84°36′04″W | Lancaster | |
| 14 | Dr. Edwards House | | November 25, 2008 (#08000650) | 572 Danville St. 37°37′20″N 84°35′36″W | Lancaster | |
| 15 | John Floyd House | | August 28, 1975 (#75000762) | Northwest of Lancaster on Burdett's Knob Rd. off U.S. Route 27; 37°41′14″N 84°38′29″W | Lancaster | |
| 16 | Garrard County Jail | Garrard County Jail | March 26, 1984 (#84001442) | Stanford St. 37°37′06″N 84°34′43″W | Lancaster | |
| 17 | Garrard Mills | Garrard Mills | March 26, 1984 (#84001447) | 205 E. Buford St. 37°37′05″N 84°34′35″W | Lancaster | Opened for business September 19, 1900 |
| 18 | Gulley Farm | | June 17, 1985 (#85001284) | U.S. Route 27; 37°41′39″N 84°39′43″W | Lancaster | |
| 19 | Hamilton House | Hamilton House | March 26, 1984 (#84001449) | 107 Maple Ave. 37°37′14″N 84°34′48″W | Lancaster | |
| 20 | Roscoe Hamilton House | | June 17, 1985 (#85001285) | Buena Vista Rd. 37°46′07″N 84°40′21″W | Lancaster | |
| 21 | J.C. Hemphill House | J.C. Hemphill House | March 26, 1984 (#84001451) | 211 Lexington St. 37°37′23″N 84°34′43″W | Lancaster | |
| 22 | Dr. Oliver Perry Hill House | Dr. Oliver Perry Hill House | March 26, 1984 (#84001455) | 106 Hill Court; 37°37′29″N 84°34′39″W | Lancaster | |
| 23 | John Hutcherson House | | June 23, 1983 (#83002778) | Off Kentucky Route 39; 37°40′21″N 84°32′17″W | Buckeye | |
| 24 | Jennings-Salter House | Jennings-Salter House | February 21, 1980 (#80001531) | 208 Danville St. 37°37′11″N 84°34′51″W | Lancaster | |
| 25 | Thomas Kings, III House | | June 23, 1983 (#83002782) | Off Kentucky Route 39; 37°31′50″N 84°30′51″W | Lancaster | |
| 26 | Lancaster Cemetery | Lancaster Cemetery | March 26, 1984 (#84001458) | Campbell, Crab Orchard, and Richmond Sts. 37°37′00″N 84°34′30″W | Lancaster | |
| 27 | Lancaster Commercial Historic District | Lancaster Commercial Historic District | March 26, 1984 (#84001461) | Danville, Lexington, Richmond, and Stanford Sts. 37°37′10″N 84°34′46″W | Lancaster | |
| 28 | Lane Farm | | June 17, 1985 (#85001286) | Polly's Bend Rd. 37°46′42″N 84°39′26″W | Lancaster | |
| 29 | Judge V.A. Lear House | Judge V.A. Lear House | March 26, 1984 (#84001464) | 222 Lexington St. 37°37′24″N 84°34′38″W | Lancaster | |
| 30 | John Leavell Quarters | | June 23, 1983 (#83002779) | Off Kentucky Route 753; 37°43′38″N 84°39′58″W | Bryantsville | |
| 31 | Male Academy | Male Academy | March 26, 1984 (#84001467) | 108 S. Campbell St. 37°37′05″N 84°34′40″W | Lancaster | |
| 32 | Sue Shelby Mason House | Sue Shelby Mason House | March 26, 1984 (#84001470) | 213 Lexington St. 37°37′24″N 84°34′43″W | Lancaster | |
| 33 | Isaac Metcalf House | | June 17, 1985 (#85001287) | Broadus Branch Rd. 37°38′18″N 84°25′57″W | Lancaster | |
| 34 | Methodist Episcopal Church | Methodist Episcopal Church | July 2, 1984 (#84001473) | Stanford St. 37°37′05″N 84°34′45″W | Lancaster | |
| 35 | William Miller Place | | June 17, 1985 (#85001288) | Junction of Kentucky Routes 21 and 52; 37°36′58″N 84°24′23″W | Paint Lick | |
| 36 | Mt. Olivet Methodist Church | | June 17, 1985 (#85001289) | Off Kentucky Route 152; 37°44′47″N 84°39′07″W | Lancaster | |
| 37 | Carry A. Nation House | Carry A. Nation House | December 16, 1977 (#77000620) | West of Lancaster on Fisher Ford Rd. 37°42′48″N 84°43′13″W | Lancaster | Childhood home of temperance movement leader Carrie Nation. |
| 38 | Gov. William Owsley House | Gov. William Owsley House | May 6, 1975 (#75000763) | 0.5 miles south of Lancaster on U.S. Route 27; 37°36′33″N 84°34′50″W | Lancaster | |
| 39 | Paint Lick Commercial District | | February 24, 2014 (#14000017) | Roughly along Richmond Rd. 37°37′03″N 84°24′29″W | Paint Lick | |
| 40 | Paint Lick Presbyterian Church | | June 17, 1985 (#85001290) | Kentucky Route 52; 37°35′12″N 84°26′11″W | Paint Lick | |
| 41 | Paint Lick School | | April 10, 2007 (#07000284) | 10973 Richmond Rd. 37°36′35″N 84°24′52″W | Paint Lick | |
| 42 | Parke-Moore House | | June 17, 1985 (#85001291) | U.S. Route 27; 37°39′18″N 84°36′23″W | Lancaster | |
| 43 | William Parks House | | June 17, 1985 (#85001292) | Locust Lane; 37°40′38″N 84°37′08″W | Lancaster | |
| 44 | Peacock House | Peacock House | March 26, 1984 (#84001481) | 215 Buford St. 37°37′05″N 84°34′55″W | Lancaster | |
| 45 | Peacock-Miller House | Peacock-Miller House | March 26, 1984 (#84001482) | 212 Danville St. 37°37′11″N 84°34′54″W | Lancaster | |
| 46 | Lucien Perkins Farm | | September 28, 1989 (#85003767) | Crab Orchard Rd. 4.3 miles south of Lancaster; 37°34′13″N 84°32′44″W | Lancaster | |
| 47 | Perkins-Daniel House | Perkins-Daniel House | June 17, 1985 (#85001293) | Gilbert's Creek; 37°34′22″N 84°34′01″W | Lancaster | |
| 48 | Petrie House | | March 26, 1984 (#84001484) | 404 Danville St. 37°37′16″N 84°35′21″W | Lancaster | |
| 49 | Proctor House | | June 23, 1983 (#83002780) | U.S. Route 27; 37°44′39″N 84°37′41″W | Bryantsville | |
| 50 | Rankin Place | Rankin Place | June 17, 1985 (#85001294) | 2596 Old Danville Rd. 37°36′19″N 84°37′20″W | Lancaster | |
| 51 | Ray House | | June 17, 1985 (#85001295) | Jess Ray Rd. 37°41′05″N 84°32′47″W | Lancaster | |
| 52 | Tom Salter House | Tom Salter House | June 17, 1985 (#85001296) | Kentucky Route 39; 37°34′56″N 84°33′46″W | Lancaster | |
| 53 | Sebastian Log House | | June 17, 1985 (#85001297) | Nina Ridge; 37°41′05″N 84°28′37″W | Lancaster | |
| 54 | Sharp House | | June 17, 1985 (#85001298) | Fisher Ford Rd. 37°42′18″N 84°43′19″W | Lancaster | |
| 55 | Smith House | | June 17, 1985 (#85001299) | Junction of Kentucky Routes 52 and 1647; 37°35′32″N 84°29′58″W | Paint Lick | |
| 56 | James Smith Tanyard | | June 23, 1983 (#83002781) | Off U.S. Route 27; 37°43′18″N 84°40′12″W | Bryantsville | |
| 57 | Spring Garden-John Leavell | | June 17, 1985 (#85001300) | Ballard Lane-Tanyard Branch; 37°43′38″N 84°39′58″W | Bryantsville | |
| 58 | Stapp Homeplace | | June 17, 1985 (#85001301) | Kentucky Route 39; 37°44′56″N 84°31′15″W | Lancaster | |
| 59 | Paris Teater House | | June 17, 1985 (#85001303) | Kentucky Route 39; 37°45′25″N 84°31′32″W | Lancaster | |
| 60 | William Teater House | | June 17, 1985 (#85001302) | Kentucky Route 39; 37°40′29″N 84°30′52″W | Teatersville | |
| 61 | Smith Thompson Log House | | June 17, 1985 (#85001304) | Wolf Trail Road (Kentucky Route 563); 37°44′32″N 84°32′28″W | Lancaster | |
| 62 | Walden Place | | June 17, 1985 (#85001305) | Sugar Creek; 37°44′02″N 84°33′38″W | Lancaster | |
| 63 | Walker House | | June 17, 1985 (#85001306) | Kentucky Route 1295; 37°38′44″N 84°27′45″W | Lancaster | |
| 64 | Michael Wallace House | | June 23, 1983 (#83002783) | Broadus Branch Rd. 37°37′33″N 84°26′09″W | Kirksville | |
| 65 | Wearren Place | | March 26, 1984 (#84001490) | Stanford St. 37°36′55″N 84°34′53″W | Lancaster | |
| 66 | Wherritt House | Wherritt House | March 26, 1984 (#84001494) | 210 Lexington St. 37°37′16″N 84°34′42″W | Lancaster | |
| 67 | Paul Wilson Place | | June 17, 1985 (#85001307) | Off Polly's Bend Rd. 37°45′55″N 84°40′05″W | Lancaster | |

== Former listing ==
| | Name on the Register | Image | Date listed | Date removed | Location | City or town | Description |
|---|---|---|---|---|---|---|---|
| 1 | Camp Dick Robinson Headquarters | | December 12, 1976 (#76000888) | December 7, 1990 | 7 miles northwest of Lancaster on U.S. Route 27 | Lancaster | Delisted due to significant alteration. |

== See also ==
- List of National Historic Landmarks in Kentucky
- National Register of Historic Places listings in Kentucky
