= Arnold House =

Arnold House may refer to:

in Britain

- Arnold House School, London
- Arnold House, Llanddulas, Conwy, north Wales
- Arnold House Preparatory School, Chester
- Arnold School, Blackpool

in the United States

(by state, then city)

- George Arnold House, Kenton, Delaware, listed on the National Register of Historic Places (NRHP)
- Willcoxon-Arnold House, Newnan, Georgia, listed on the NRHP in Coweta County, Georgia
- Thomas P. Arnold House, Palmetto, Georgia, listed on the NRHP in Fulton County, Georgia
- Dr. John Arnold Farm, Rushville, Indiana, listed on the National Register of Historic Places (NRHP) in Rush County
- Dr. John Arnold Farm, Union Township, Indiana, listed on the NRHP in Rush County, Indiana
- Philip Arnold House, Elizabethtown, Kentucky, listed on the NRHP in Hardin County, Kentucky
- John Arnold House (Paint Lick, Kentucky), listed on the NRHP in Garrard County
- Francis Arnold House, near St. Cloud, Minnesota, listed on the NRHP in Stearns County, Minnesota
- Benjamin Walworth Arnold House and Carriage House, Albany, New York, NRHP-listed
- Arnold Homestead, Dayton, Ohio, NRHP-listed
- Arnold–Park Log Home, Portland, Oregon, NRHP-listed
- Eleazer Arnold House, Lincoln, Rhode Island, an NRHP-listed house and also a museum
- Israel Arnold House, Lincoln, Rhode Island, NRHP-listed
- Mitchell-Arnold House, Pawtucket, Rhode Island, NRHP-listed
- Arnold-Palmer House, Providence, Rhode Island, NRHP-listed
- John Waterman Arnold House, Warwick, Rhode Island, NRHP-listed
- John Arnold House (Woonsocket, Rhode Island), listed on the NRHP
- Arnold-Harrell House, Murfreesboro, Tennessee, listed on the NRHP in Rutherford County, Tennessee
- Arnold-Torbet House, Georgetown, Texas, listed on the NRHP in Williamson County, Texas
- Russell-Arnold House, Lufkin, Texas, listed on the NRHP in Angelina County, Texas
- Arnold-Simonton House, Montgomery, Texas, listed on the NRHP in Montgomery County, Texas
- E. Clarke and Julia Arnold House, Columbus, Wisconsin, NRHP-listed
- Capt. Alexander A. Arnold Farm, Galesville, Wisconsin, NRHP-listed

== See also ==
- John Arnold House (disambiguation)
