= John Arnold House =

John Arnold House may refer to:

- Dr. John Arnold Farm, Rushville, Indiana, listed on the National Register of Historic Places (NRHP) in Rush County
- John Arnold House (Paint Lick, Kentucky), listed on the NRHP in Garrard County
- John Waterman Arnold House, Warwick, Rhode Island, listed on the NRHP
- John Arnold House (Woonsocket, Rhode Island), listed on the NRHP

== See also ==
- Arnold House (disambiguation)
