= Dalton House =

Dalton House may refer to:

- Dalton House (Dalton, Pennsylvania), US
- Dalton House (Lancaster, Kentucky), US
- Dalton House (Newburyport, Massachusetts), US
- Dalton House (Brisbane, Queensland, Australia), part of John Dalton's Residential Architecture
- Dalton House with St Michaels, Bristol, UK, later merged into Trinity College, Bristol
