= John Hutcherson House =

Historic house in Kentucky, United States

- U.S. National Register of Historic Places
- Location within Kentucky Location within the United States
- Location: Off Kentucky Route 39, near Buckeye, Kentucky
- Coordinates: 37°40′21″N 84°32′17″W
- Area: 1.3 acres (0.53 ha)
- Built: c.1800
- Architectural style: Federal
- MPS: Early Stone Buildings of Central Kentucky TR
- NRHP reference No.: 83002778
- Added to NRHP: June 23, 1983

The John Hutcherson House, in Garrard County, Kentucky near Buckeye, is a historic stone house built around 1800. It was listed on the National Register of Historic Places in 1983.

It is a one-and-a-half-story five bay dry stone house with a central passage plan layout.
