= Dunn-Watkins House =

Historic house in Kentucky, United States

- U.S. National Register of Historic Places
- Location within Kentucky Location within the United States
- Nearest city: Lancaster, Kentucky
- Coordinates: 37°37′54″N 84°36′04″W
- Area: 0.3 acres (0.12 ha)
- Architectural style: Italianate
- MPS: Garrard County MRA
- NRHP reference No.: 85001283
- Added to NRHP: June 17, 1985

The Dunn-Watkins House, located on Danville Rd./Kentucky Route 52 northwest of Lancaster in Garrard County, Kentucky, was listed on the National Register of Historic Places in 1985.

It is a two-story four-bay brick house with some elements of Italianate style, including rounded arch windows. It has a central chimney and a rear ell.

It has also been known as Watkins Farm.
