= Dalton House (Lancaster, Kentucky) =

Historic house in Kentucky, United States

- U.S. National Register of Historic Places
- Location within Kentucky Location within the United States
- Location: Kentucky Route 39 2.2 miles (3.5 km) south of Lancaster, Kentucky
- Coordinates: 37°35′36″N 84°34′21″W
- Area: less than one acre
- Built: 1820
- Architectural style: Federal
- MPS: Garrard County MRA
- NRHP reference No.: 85001282
- Added to NRHP: June 17, 1985

The Dalton House in Garrard County, Kentucky, located on Kentucky Route 39 near Lancaster, was built in 1820. It was listed on the National Register of Historic Places in 1985.

It is a one-story, five-bay, brick Federal-style house with a porch added in the 1900s.
