= Bryantsville United Methodist Church =

Historic church in Kentucky, United States

- Bryantsville Methodist Church
- U.S. National Register of Historic Places
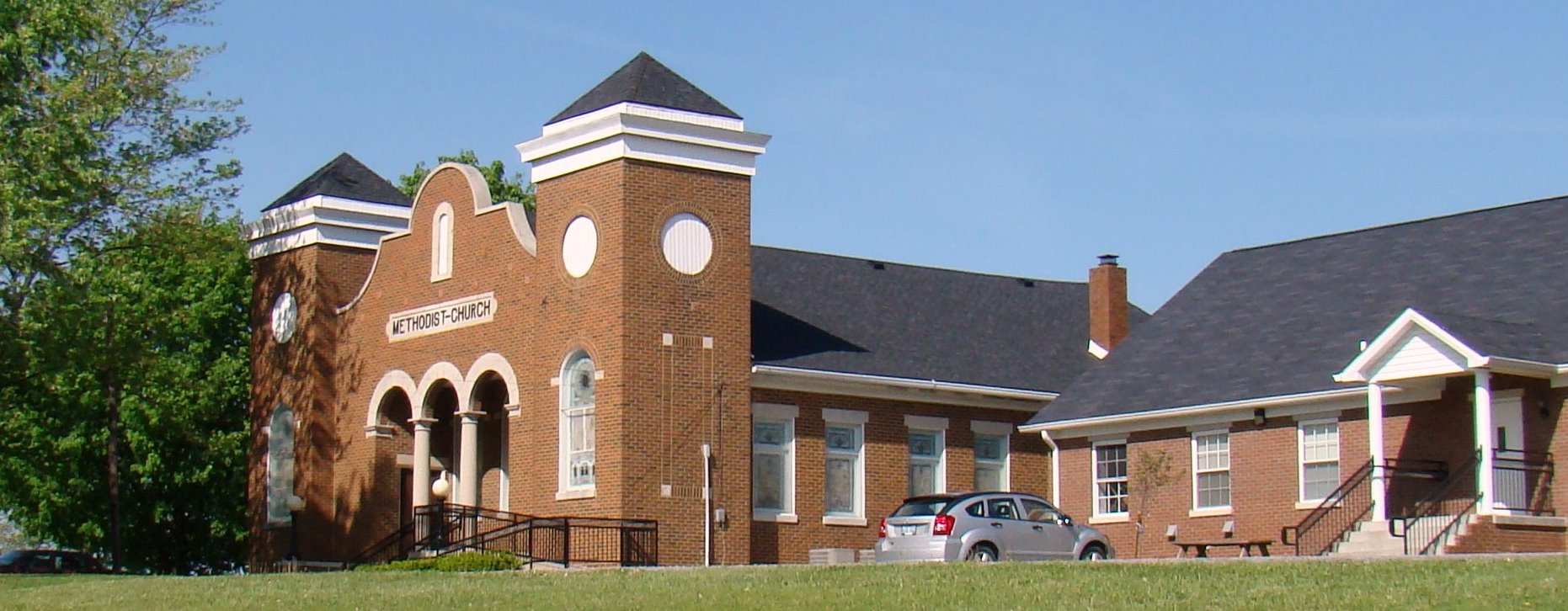
- Bryantsville Methodist Church

- Location within Kentucky Location within the United States
- Nearest city: Lancaster, Kentucky
- Coordinates: 37°42′48″N 84°39′3″W
- Architect: James and Watkins
- Architectural style: Romanesque
- MPS: Garrard County MRA
- NRHP reference No.: 85001279
- Added to NRHP: June 17, 1985

Bryantsville United Methodist Church, formerly known as Bryantsville Methodist Church, is a United Methodist church located in the area named Bryantsville in Garrard County, Kentucky near Lancaster. The Romanesque style building was added to the United States National Register of Historic Places in 1985. The records of this congregation date back at least to 1857, and the present structure was largely completed in 1920.
