= National Register of Historic Places listings in Montgomery County, Texas =

Location of Montgomery County in Texas

This is a list of the National Register of Historic Places listings in Montgomery County, Texas.

This is intended to be a complete list of properties listed on the National Register of Historic Places in Montgomery County, Texas. There are two properties listed on the National Register in the county; another was once listed but has been removed. The former property is a Recorded Texas Historic Landmark.

This National Park Service list is complete through NPS recent listings posted October 23, 2026.

== Current listings ==
The locations of National Register properties may be seen in a mapping service provided.

	Name on the Register	Image	Date listed	Location	City or town	Description
1	Kirbee Kiln Site	Kirbee Kiln Site	August 28, 1973 (#73001970)	Address Restricted	Montgomery	Manufacturing Site of mid-19th-century Texas stoneware pottery. 41MQ38
2	Montgomery County Hospital		April 12, 2024 (#100010230)	301 S. 1st Street; 30°18′29″N 95°27′10″W	Montgomery	

== Former listing ==
	Name on the Register	Image	Date listed	Date removed	Location	City or town	Description
1	Arnold-Simonton House	Arnold-Simonton House	December 11, 1979 (#79002996)	February 23, 2015	770 Clepper Dr. 30°23′33″N 95°41′25″W	Montgomery	Recorded Texas Historic Landmark; early Texas Greek Revival structure built in 1845; moved from original site on Rankin St. to Stewart St. in 1977 and moved again in 2010 to Fernland Historical Park

== See also ==
- National Register of Historic Places listings in Texas
- Recorded Texas Historic Landmarks in Montgomery County
