= Old Garrard County Jail =

- Garrard County Jail
- U.S. National Register of Historic Places
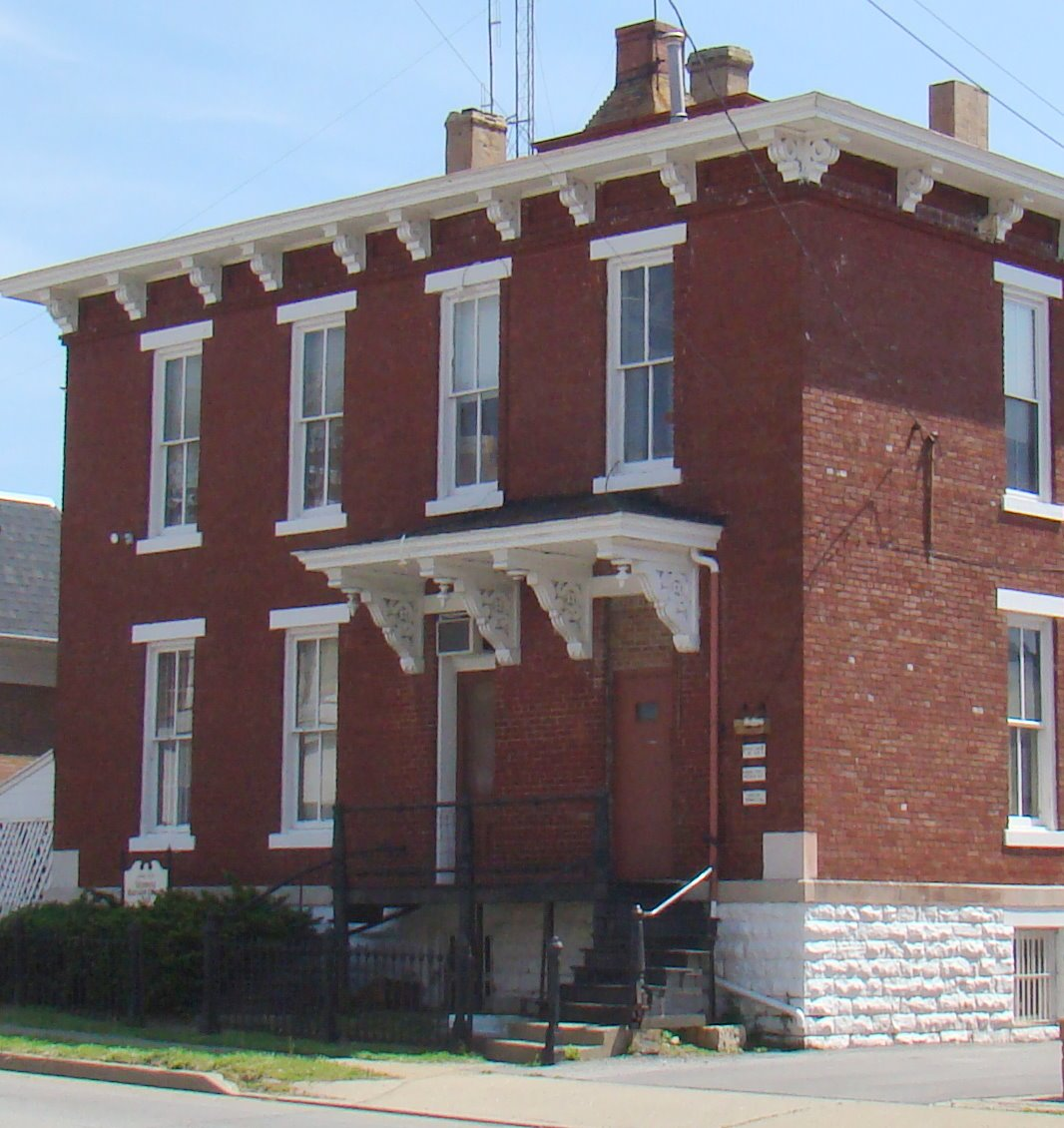
- The Old Garrard County Jail

- Location within Kentucky Location within the United States
- Location: Lancaster, Kentucky
- Coordinates: 37°37′6″N 84°34′43″W
- Built: 1873
- Architect: May, Edwin; Goshern, J. S.
- Architectural style: Italianate
- MPS: Lancaster MRA
- NRHP reference No.: 84001442
- Added to NRHP: March 26, 1984

The Old Garrard County Jail is a historic Italianate-style building in Lancaster, Kentucky that was added to the United States National Register of Historic Places in 1984.

It is a two-story four bay building. It has been deemed a "Good example of Italianate style."

It was used as the county jail from 1873 to 1986. The building is currently used as a museum known as the Garrard County Jail Museum. Visitors can view the cells, a display commemorating USS Garrard, and local historic and military memorabilia.
