= Zophar Carpenter's Fort =

Carpenter's Fort on McKenzie's Fork of Paint Lick Creek in Kentucky was established by Zophar Carpenter, a native of New York colony who migrated to western Virginia in the 1750s and to Kentucky about 1788. The fort is also referred to as Zophar Carpenter's Station, and placed "near Suck Fork Creek". Zophar Carpenter served as a drummer in Captain Dickenson's Company of Virginia Rangers in the French & Indian War. He appeared on a 1792 tax list in Madison Co. KY with Edward Carpenter and John Carpenter. He died on February 6, 1798, at age 65 and is interred in the Carpenter Graveyard near Paint Lick, Garrard County, Kentucky.
