= Barlow House (Lancaster, Kentucky) =

Historic house in Kentucky, United States

- U.S. National Register of Historic Places
- Location within Kentucky Location within the United States
- Location: Off Danville Rd. (Kentucky Route 52), about 5 miles west of Lancaster, Kentucky
- Coordinates: 37°38′08″N 84°36′54″W
- Area: 0.4 acres (0.16 ha)
- Built: c.1850
- Architectural style: Greek Revival
- MPS: Garrard County MRA
- NRHP reference No.: 85001276
- Added to NRHP: June 17, 1985

The Barlow House, on Danville Rd. in Garrard County, Kentucky, near Lancaster, is a Greek Revival-style house built c.1850. It was listed on the National Register of Historic Places in 1985.

It is a two-story three-bay frame and log house. It was deemed "One of the county's best examples of the mid 19th century I-houses related to agricultural development."
