= Walker House (Lancaster, Kentucky) =

Historic house in Kentucky, United States

- U.S. National Register of Historic Places
- Location within Kentucky Location within the United States
- Location: Kentucky Route 1295, Garrard County, Kentucky
- Nearest city: Lancaster, Kentucky
- Coordinates: 37°38′48.2″N 84°27′43.6″W
- Area: 24.79 acres (10.03 ha)
- Built: 1880
- Architectural style: Italianate
- MPS: Garrard County MRA
- NRHP reference No.: 85001306
- Added to NRHP: June 17, 1985

The Walker House in Garrard County, Kentucky is a historic house on Kentucky Route 1295 about 7.5 miles (12.1 km) north of Lancaster, Kentucky. It was added to the National Register of Historic Places in 1985.

It is a two-story, 14-room central hall plan Italianate-style house built in 1824.

It was home of the Walker family who developed the "Walker hounds" for fox hunting. It has also been deemed Garrard County's "best example of a brlck Italianate residence."

== Further information ==
- Powell, Helen (1983). "Walker House" (PDF). Kentucky Historic Resources Inventory.
