= Jennings-Salter House =

Historic house in Kentucky, United States

- U.S. National Register of Historic Places
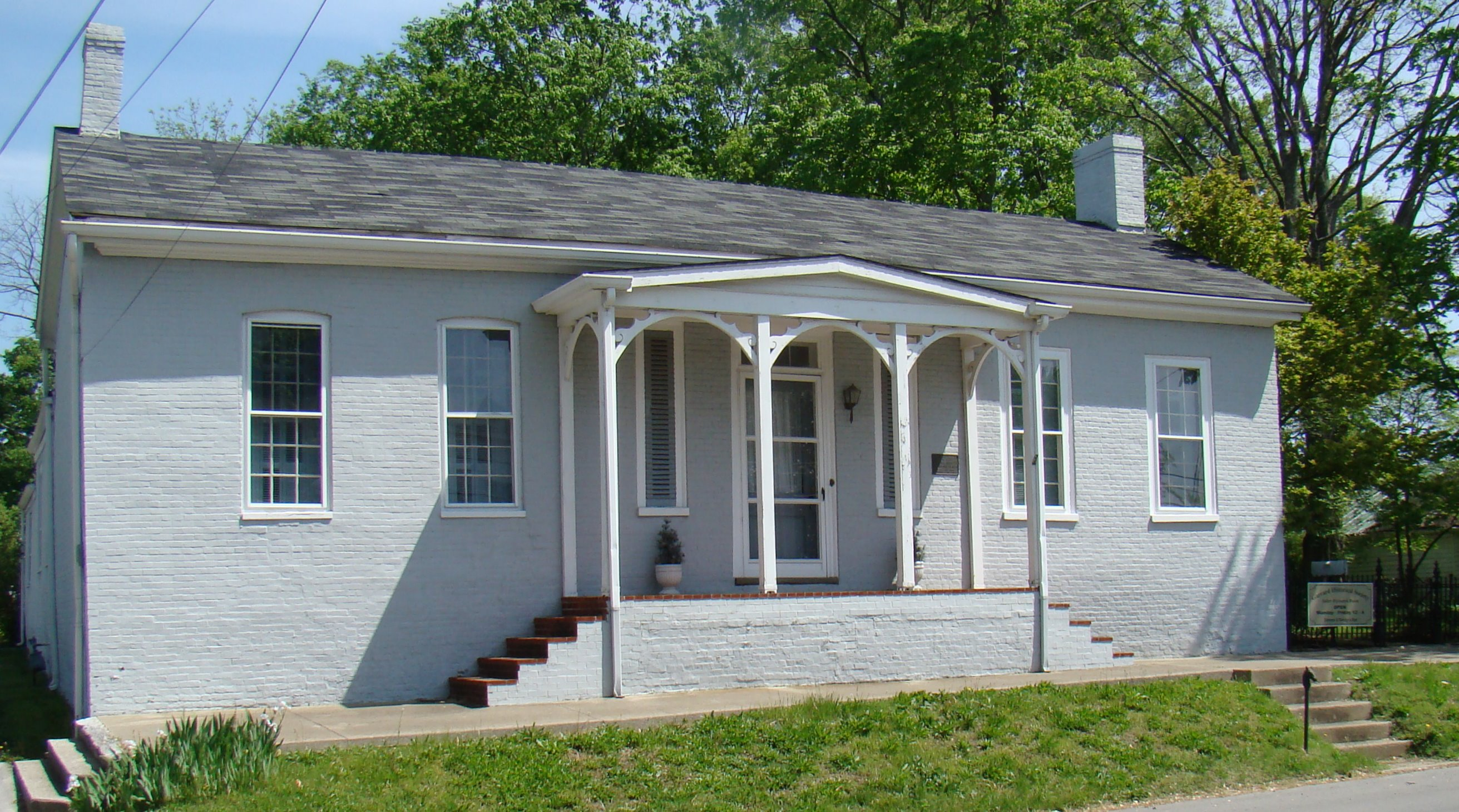
- Jennings-Salter House

- Location within Kentucky Location within the United States
- Location: Lancaster, Kentucky
- Coordinates: 37°37′11″N 84°34′51″W
- Built: 1821
- Architectural style: Federal
- NRHP reference No.: 80001531
- Added to NRHP: February 21, 1980

The Jennings-Salter House, also known as the Michael Salter House, is a historic house located in Lancaster, Kentucky. The house was placed on the United States National Register of Historic Places in 1980.

It was built during 1821 to 1826. It is a one-story, five-bay, Federal-style structure built of brick laid in Flemish bond.

At some point, it came to house the Garrard County Historical Society.
