= Teatersville, Kentucky =

Unincorporated community in Kentucky, United States

- Unincorporated community
- Location within the state of Kentucky
- Coordinates: 37°41′20″N 84°30′25″W
- Country: United States
- State: Kentucky
- County: Garrard
- Elevation: 951 ft (290 m)
- Time zone: UTC-5 (Eastern (EST))
  - Summer (DST): UTC-4 (EDT)
- GNIS ID: 509191

Teatersville is an unincorporated community in Garrard County, Kentucky, United States. Its post office is closed.
