= Roscoe Hamilton House =

Historic house in Kentucky, United States

- U.S. National Register of Historic Places
- Location within Kentucky Location within the United States
- Nearest city: Lancaster, Kentucky
- Coordinates: 37°46′07″N 84°40′21″W
- Area: 1.1 acres (0.45 ha)
- Built: c.1855
- Architectural style: Greek Revival
- MPS: Garrard County MRA
- NRHP reference No.: 85001285
- Added to NRHP: June 17, 1985

The Roscoe Hamilton House, on Buena Vista Rd. near Lancaster, Kentucky, is a Greek Revival-style house. It was listed on the National Register of Historic Places in 1985.

It is a two-story, five bay central passage plan frame house with brick interior end chimneys. It has a pedimented portico and a one-story ell. It dates from c.1850-1860.
