= USS Garrard =

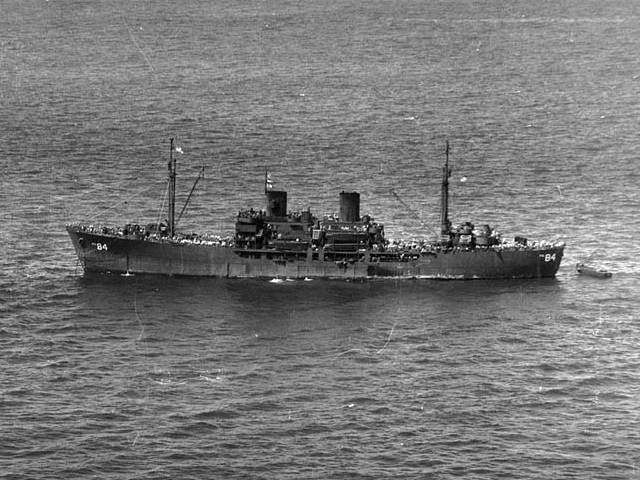

History

United States
- Name: USS Garrard
- Namesake: Garrard County, Kentucky
- Builder: Consolidated Steel
- Laid down: 28 October 1944
- Launched: 13 January 1945
- Sponsored by: Mrs. Stephen Royce
- Acquired: 2 March 1944
- Commissioned: 3 March 1945
- Decommissioned: 21 May 1946
- Stricken: May 1946
- Identification: APA-84
- Honours and awards: Two battle stars for World War II
- Fate: Sold for scrap, 3 June 1963

General characteristics
- Class & type: Gilliam-class attack transport
- Displacement: 4,247 tons (lt), 7,080 t.(fl)
- Length: 426 ft (130 m)
- Beam: 58 ft (18 m)
- Draft: 16 ft (4.9 m)
- Propulsion: Westinghouse turboelectric drive, 2 boilers, 2 propellers, Design shaft horsepower 6,000
- Speed: 16.9 knots (31.3 km/h; 19.4 mph)
- Capacity: 47 officers, 802 enlisted
- Crew: 27 officers, 295 enlisted
- Armament: 1 x 5"/38 caliber dual-purpose gun mount, 4 x twin 40 mm gun mounts, 10 x single 20 mm gun mounts
- Notes: MCV Hull No. ?, hull type S4-SE2-BD1

USS Garrard (APA-84) was a Gilliam-class attack transport that served with the United States Navy from 1945 to 1946. She was scrapped in 1963.

== History ==
Garrard was named after Garrard County, Kentucky. She was laid down under Maritime Commission contract by Consolidated Steel at Wilmington, Los Angeles on 28 October 1944. Launched 13 January 1945, acquired by the Navy 2 March 1945 and commissioned at San Pedro 3 March 1945.

=== World War II ===
After shakedown and amphibious training along the California Coast, Garrard embarked sailors and Army Aviation Engineers and departed Seattle 3 May for the Western Pacific. Steaming via Pearl Harbor, Eniwetok, and Guam, she arrived Ulithi, Carolines, 28 May.

==== Invasion of Okinawa ====
She sailed 20 June for Okinawa and reached Hagushi Beach the 24th. As her gunners helped repel Japanese air attacks, she landed men and cargo of the 854th Aviation Engineers before departing for Leyte, Philippine Islands, 28 June.

Garrard embarked fleet replacements, loaded cargo and mail, and departed 8 July as a logistics support ship to supply the 3d Fleet off the Japanese coast. She rendezvoused 17 July; and, after completing transfer of men and cargo by highline, she sailed 22 July for Eniwetok, where she arrived the 26th.

=== After hostilities ===
After serving as a receiving ship, Garrard departed 13 August to once more carry men and cargo to the 3rd Fleet. She rendezvoused 17 August, embarked sailors and marines at sea for occupation duty in Japan, then steamed for Japan 20 August with Task Force 31. Arriving Tokyo Bay 27 August, she debarked her troops at Yokosuka 30 August. Between 10 and 15 September she steamed to Sendai, Japan, and back to transport liberated prisoners of war. After embarking 726 veterans, she departed Yokosuka 13 October and sailed to the United States, where she arrived Portland, Oregon, 25 October.

==== Operation Magic Carpet ====
Assigned to Operation Magic Carpet, the massive sealift to take demobilizing soldiers home, Garrard departed San Francisco for the Philippines 19 November. Reaching Manila 11 December, she embarked 905 homebound troops and sailed for San Francisco 14 December. Arriving 3 January 1946, she entered Mare Island Naval Shipyard before sailing for Seattle 6 February.

=== Decommissioning ===
After completing an inactivation overhaul at Puget Sound Naval Shipyard, she decommissioned at Bellingham, Washington, 21 May 1946. Transferred to the War Shipping Administration on 29 June, she entered the National Defense Reserve Fleet at Olympia, Washington. She was sold to Zidell Exploration Company Inc. of Portland, Oregon, for scrapping 3 June 1963. The ship was de-constructed and the metal was used to build several large barges for exploration uses by Zidell Exploration Company. The remainder of the ships metal and other materials were sold to several private corporations.

Garrard received two battle stars for World War II service.
