= Michael Wallace House =

Historic house in Kentucky, United States

- U.S. National Register of Historic Places
- Location within Kentucky Location within the United States
- Nearest city: Kirksville, Kentucky
- Coordinates: 37°37′33″N 84°26′09″W
- Area: 0.3 acres (0.12 ha)
- Built: c.1795
- Architectural style: Federal
- MPS: Early Stone Buildings of Central Kentucky TR
- NRHP reference No.: 83002783
- Added to NRHP: June 23, 1983

The Michael Wallace House on Broadus Branch Rd. in Garrard County, Kentucky, near Kirksville, was listed on the National Register of Historic Places in 1983.

It was built in the 1790s. It is a one-and-a-half-story four-bay dry stone house of saltbox shape.

It was built by pioneer Michael Wallace. Wallace also built and operated a grist mill on Paint Lick Creek below the house.
