= Paint Lick Presbyterian Church =

Historic church in Kentucky, United States

- U.S. National Register of Historic Places
- Location within Kentucky Location within the United States
- Location: KY 52, Paint Lick, Kentucky
- Coordinates: 37°35′12″N 84°26′11″W
- Area: 0.4 acres (0.16 ha)
- Built: 1879
- Architectural style: Gothic Revival
- MPS: Garrard County MRA
- NRHP reference No.: 85001290
- Added to NRHP: June 17, 1985

The Paint Lick Presbyterian Church is a historic church at KY 52 in Paint Lick, Kentucky. The Gothic Revival church was built in 1879 and added to the National Register of Historic Places in 1985.

It was deemed significant as "Garrard County's best example of a rural Italianate brick sanctuary as well as housing one of the area's oldest Presbyterian congregations" (founded in 1782).
