= Methodist Episcopal Church (Lancaster, Kentucky) =

Historic church in Kentucky, United States

- U.S. National Register of Historic Places
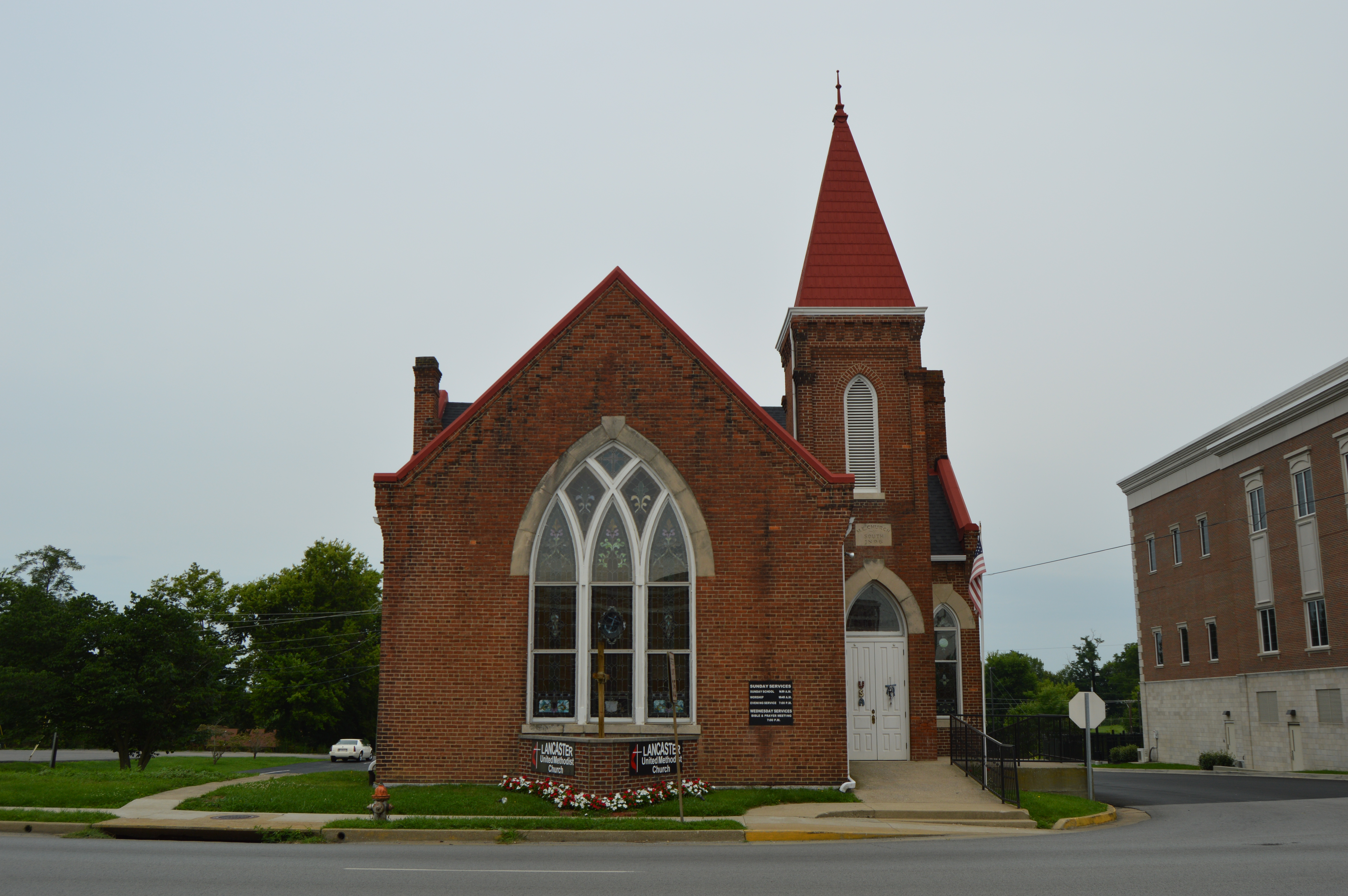

- Location within Kentucky Location within the United States
- Location: Stanford St., Lancaster, Kentucky
- Coordinates: 37°37′5″N 84°34′45″W
- Area: 0.1 acres (0.040 ha)
- Built: 1896
- Architectural style: Gothic
- MPS: Lancaster MRA
- NRHP reference No.: 84001473
- Added to NRHP: July 2, 1984

The Methodist Episcopal Church in Lancaster, Kentucky is a historic Methodist Episcopal church. Located on Stanford Street, it has also been known as the Lancaster United Methodist Church. It was built in 1896 and added to the National Register in 1984.

The Methodist congregation dated back to at least 1815. It acquired this church's property from the Presbyterian church in 1878 and rebuilt the church starting in 1894, with foundation dated 1896. It was deemed notable as one of two remaining brick Gothic Revival churches in Lancaster.
