= Garrard Mills =

- U.S. National Register of Historic Places
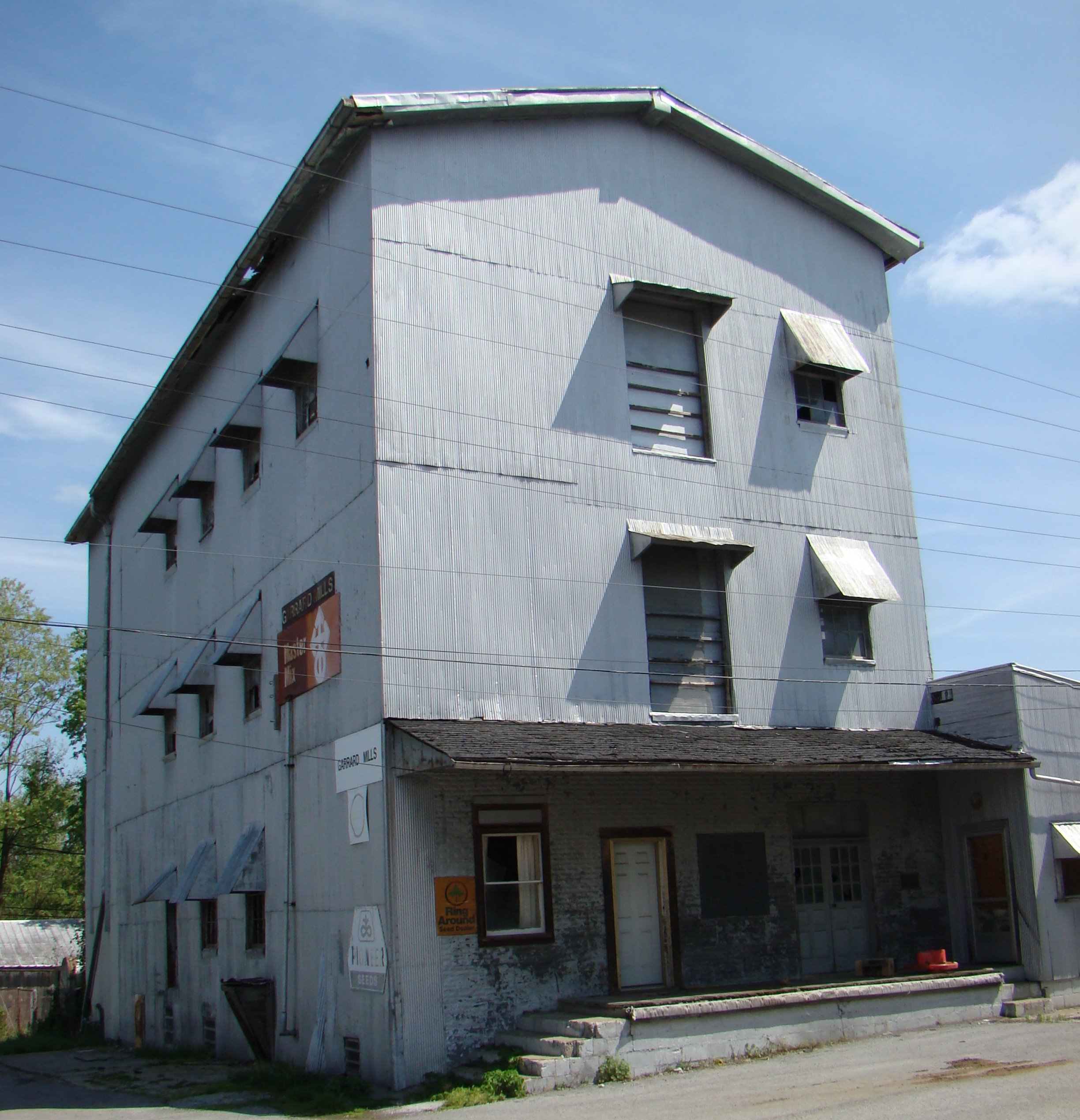
- Garrard Mills

- Location within Kentucky Location within the United States
- Location: Lancaster, Kentucky
- Coordinates: 37°37′5″N 84°34′35″W
- Built: 1901
- MPS: Lancaster MRA
- NRHP reference No.: 84001447
- Added to NRHP: March 26, 1984

Garrard Mills is a gristmill in Lancaster, Kentucky. The property was listed on the National Register of Historic Places in 1984.

It is a flour and feed mill which was built in 1900.
