= Wherritt House =

Historic house in Kentucky, United States

- U.S. National Register of Historic Places
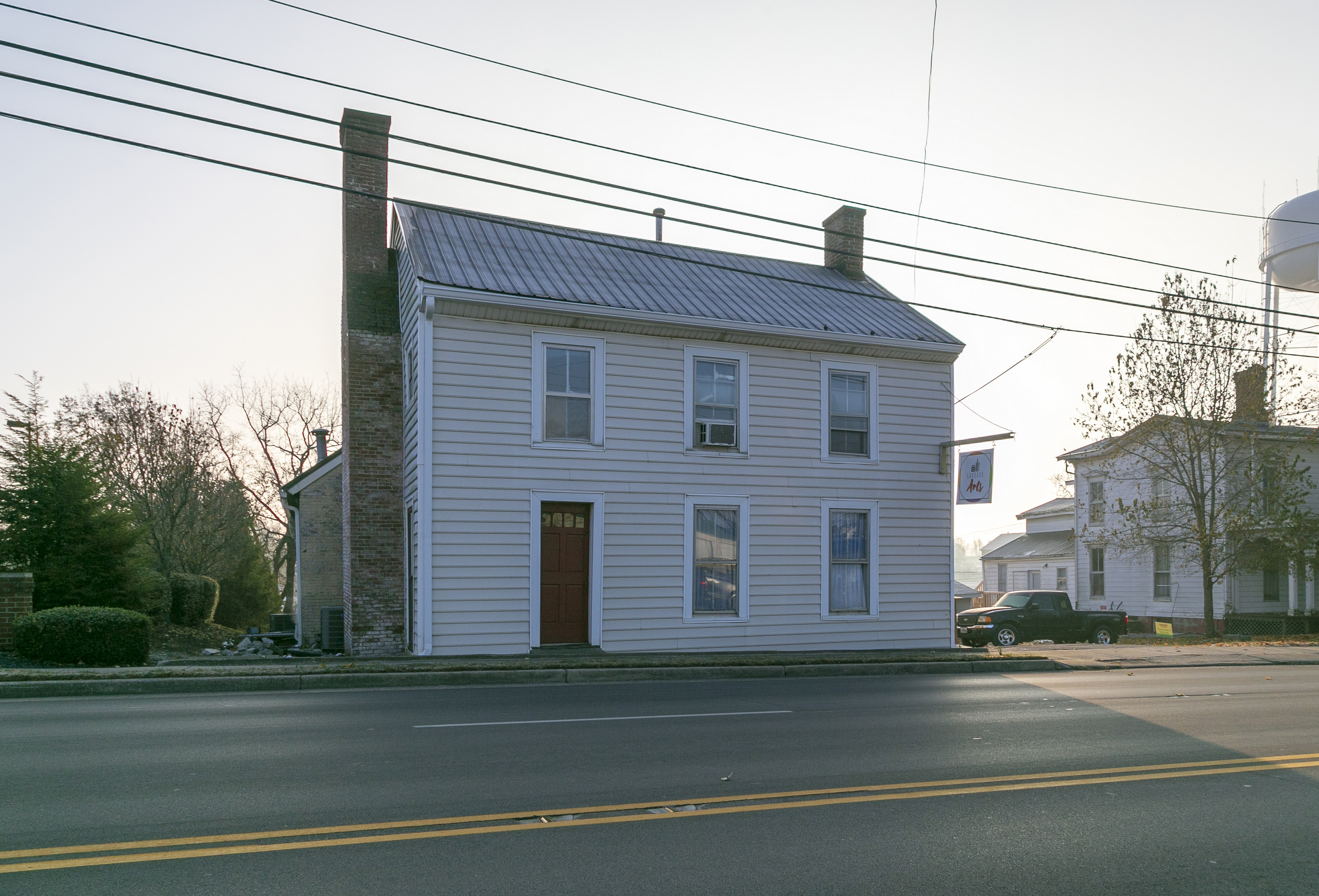

- Location within Kentucky Location within the United States
- Location: 210 Lexington St. Lancaster, Kentucky
- Coordinates: 37°37′16″N 84°34′42″W
- Area: 0.1 acres (0.040 ha)
- Built: 1801
- Architectural style: Federal
- MPS: Lancaster MRA
- NRHP reference No.: 84001494
- Added to NRHP: March 26, 1984

The Wherritt House, located at 210 Lexington St. in Lancaster, Kentucky, was listed on the National Register of Historic Places in 1984.

It is a two-story three-bay house with a gable roof on a stone foundation, built in the early 1800s. The original portion of the house is built of logs and is 30 by 20 feet (9.1 m × 6.1 m) in plan. A brick addition was added in 1830.
