= Mt. Olivet Methodist Church =

Church in Kentucky

- U.S. National Register of Historic Places
- Location within Kentucky Location within the United States
- Nearest city: Lancaster, Kentucky
- Coordinates: 37°44′47″N 84°39′7″W
- Area: 2 acres (0.81 ha)
- Built: 1886; 140 years ago
- Architectural style: Italianate
- MPS: Garrard County MRA
- NRHP reference No.: 85001289
- Added to NRHP: June 17, 1985

Mt. Olivet Methodist Church is a historic church in Lancaster, Kentucky. It was built in 1886 and added to the National Register of Historic Places in 1985.

It is Italianate in style. Brackets supporting overhanging eaves of its gable roof. It has round-arched stained glass windows.

The current pastor is Darin Gary. It donates to the United Methodist Children's Home frequently.
