= Billy Ball House =

Historic house in Kentucky, United States

- U.S. National Register of Historic Places
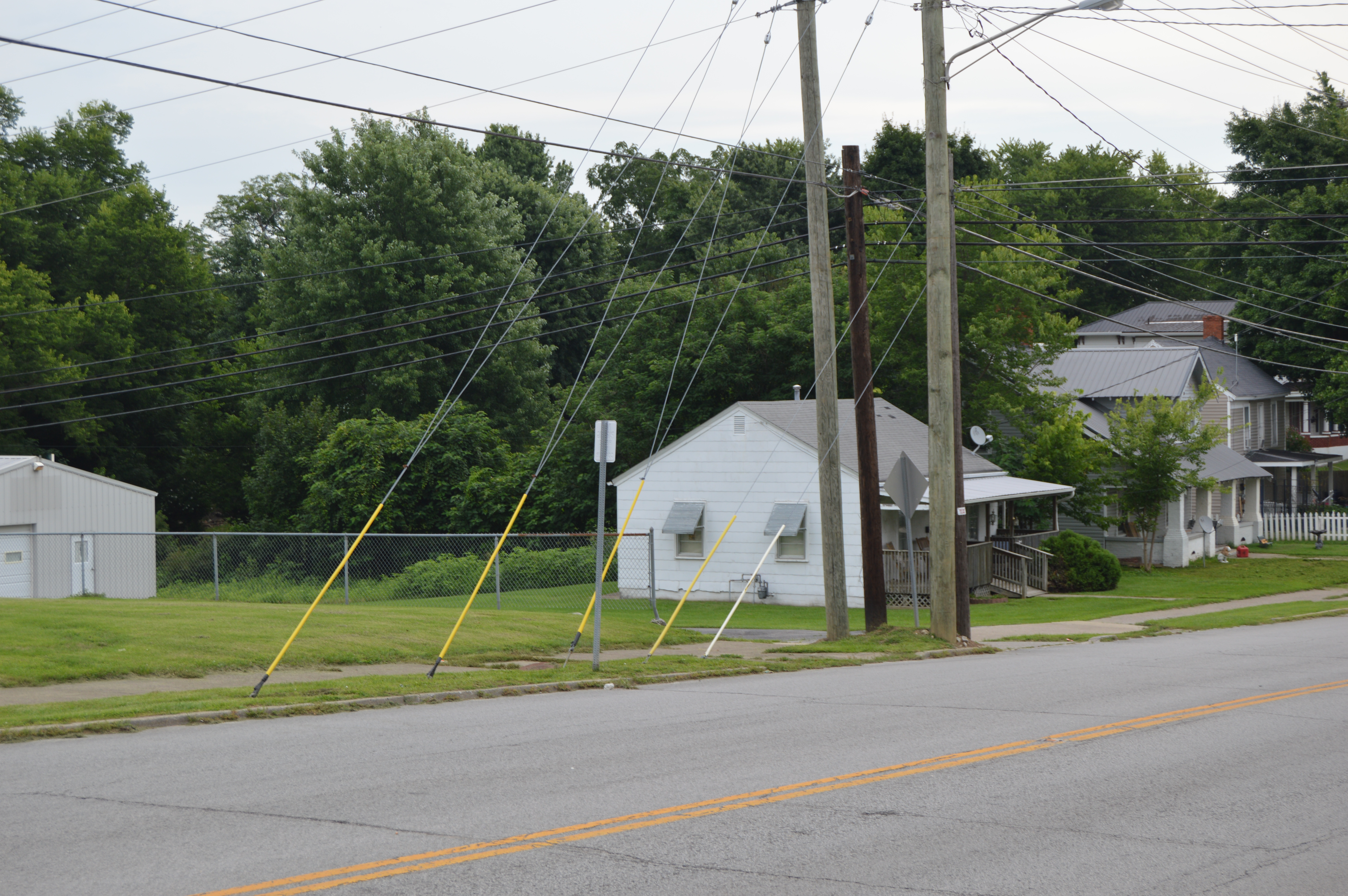
- Photo asserted to be at site of former house

- Location within Kentucky Location within the United States
- Location: 209 Richmond St., Lancaster, Kentucky
- Coordinates: 37°37′09″N 84°34′34″W
- Area: 0.2 acres (0.081 ha)
- Built: c.1835
- MPS: Lancaster MRA
- NRHP reference No.: 84001434
- Added to NRHP: March 26, 1984

The Billy Ball House, located at 209 Richmond St. in Lancaster, Kentucky, was a historic house built in 1830. Also known as Edna Reynold's House, it was listed on the National Register of Historic Places in 1984.

It was built during the 1830s. It is or was a two-story three-bay frame building on a limestone foundation, with a 27 by 18 feet (8.2 m × 5.5 m) log structure underneath its siding. In 1983, it was one of only seven log structures surviving in Lancaster, and it was vacant.

The house seems no longer to exist.
