= Buckeye, Kentucky =

Unincorporated community in Kentucky, United States

- Unincorporated community
- Location within the state of Kentucky Buckeye (the United States)
- Coordinates: 37°42′56″N 84°30′20″W
- Country: United States
- State: Kentucky
- County: Garrard
- Elevation: 955 ft (291 m)
- Time zone: UTC-5 (Eastern (EST))
  - Summer (DST): UTC-4 (EDT)
- GNIS feature ID: 507605

Buckeye is an unincorporated community in Garrard County, Kentucky, United States. It lies along Route 39 northeast of the city of Lancaster, the county seat of Garrard County. Its elevation is 955 feet (291 m).
