= Denny Place =

- U.S. National Register of Historic Places
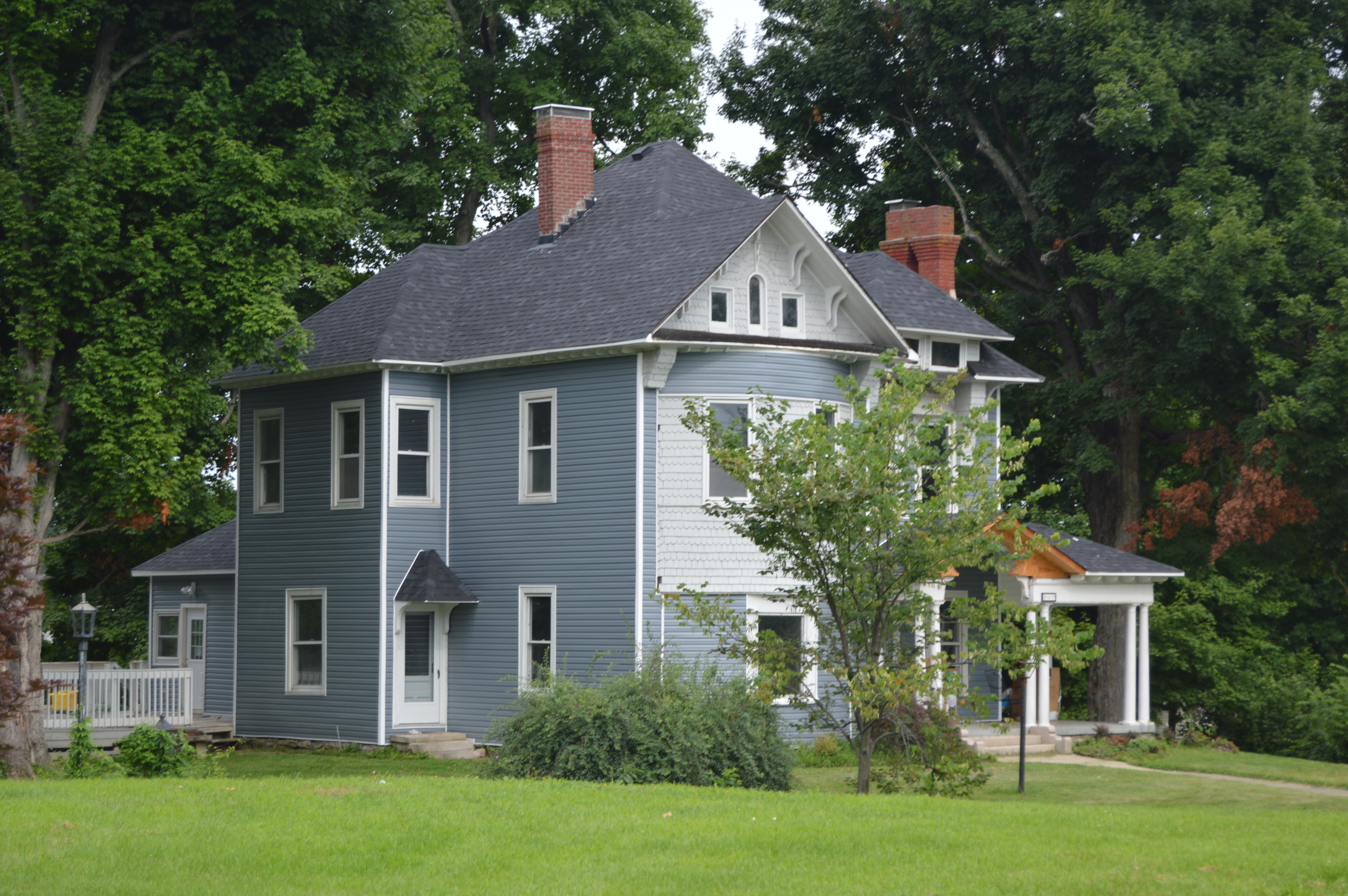
- House in 2014; siding apparently covers brick

- Location within Kentucky Location within the United States
- Location: 217 Lexington St., Lancaster, Kentucky
- Coordinates: 37°37′25″N 84°34′43″W
- Area: 0.1 acres (0.040 ha)
- Built: 1899
- Architectural style: Queen Anne
- MPS: Lancaster MRA
- NRHP reference No.: 84001439
- Added to NRHP: March 26, 1984

Denny Place, at 217 Lexington St. in Lancaster, Kentucky, is a historic house built in 1899. It was listed on the National Register of Historic Places in 1984.

It is a two-story four bay brick and wood shingle house with a high hipped roof. It has overhanging eaves supported by decorative brackets. It is the only brick Queen Anne style house remaining in Lancaster.

It was built for Samuel Cabell Denny. Denny was cashier of the National Bank of Lancaster for 30 years, then president for 10 years. His wife survived him and lived in the house until 1966.
