= Bryantsville, Kentucky =

Unincorporated community in Kentucky, United States

- Unincorporated community
- Location within the state of Kentucky Bryantsville (the United States)
- Coordinates: 37°42′52″N 84°38′57″W
- Country: United States
- State: Kentucky
- County: Garrard
- Elevation: 942 ft (287 m)
- Time zone: UTC-5 (Eastern (EST))
  - Summer (DST): UTC-4 (EDT)
- ZIP codes: 40410
- GNIS feature ID: 488178

Bryantsville is an unincorporated community in Garrard County, Kentucky, United States. It lies along U.S. Route 27 northwest of the city of Lancaster, the county seat of Garrard County. Its elevation is 942 feet (287 m). It has a post office with the ZIP code 40410.

== Demographics ==
As of 2018, Bryantsville had a population of 6,928. 96.7% of residents were White, 0.9% were Native American, 0.1% were Black, 0.3% were some other race, and 1.9% were two or more races.

== Education ==
Bryantsville is served by Garrard County Public Schools.
