= Dalton House (Newburyport, Massachusetts) =

Historic house in Massachusetts, United States

- U.S. National Register of Historic Places
- U.S. Historic district – Contributing property
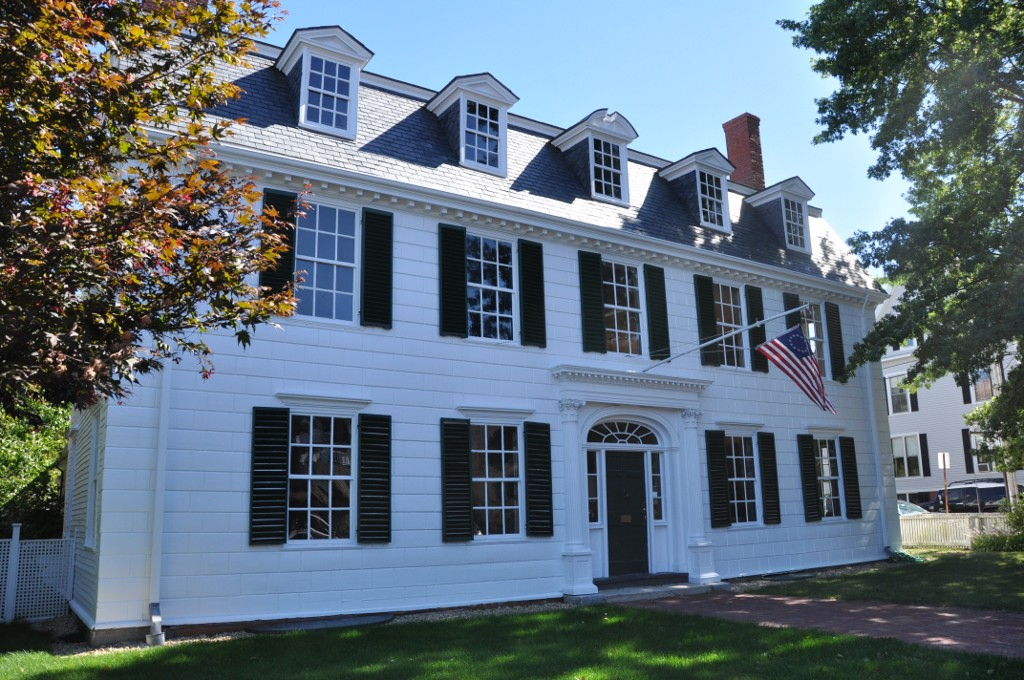

- Location within Massachusetts Location within the United States
- Location: 95 State Street, Newburyport, Massachusetts
- Coordinates: 42°48′29″N 70°52′18″W
- Built: 1746
- Architectural style: Georgian
- Part of: Newburyport Historic District (ID84002411)
- NRHP reference No.: 78000464

Significant dates
- Added to NRHP: March 29, 1978
- Designated CP: August 2, 1984

The Dalton House is a historic colonial house in Newburyport, Massachusetts. The 2 1/2-story wood-frame house was built c. 1746, and is one of the best preserved Georgian houses in the city. It was built by Michael Dalton, a mariner and merchant who settled in Newburyport in 1735. Dalton's son Tristram was a major local figure during the American Revolutionary War, and was one of the first United States senators from Massachusetts. As such, the house was visited by a number of luminaries of early American history, including George Washington and the Marquis de Lafayette. The house was acquired by the Dalton Club, a men's social club, in 1898.

The house was listed on the National Register of Historic Places in 1978, and included in the Newburyport Historic District in 1984.

== See also ==
- National Register of Historic Places listings in Essex County, Massachusetts
