= Kirbee Kiln Site =

- U.S. National Register of Historic Places
- Location: Address restricted
- Built: c. 1849
- NRHP reference No.: 73001970
- Added to NRHP: August 28, 1973

The Kirbee Kiln Site is a 19th-century kiln ruin located in Montgomery County, Texas, where stoneware was manufactured by the Kirbee family. It is one of the largest groundhog kilns ever recorded in the American South. The exact location of the site is restricted. It was listed on the National Register of Historic Places in 1973.

== History ==
The Kirbee Kiln was founded and operated by James Kirbee, who was originally from Edgefield, South Carolina, and had relatives and acquaintances who were also potters. One of his acquaintances might have been David Drake, a potter who was enslaved by Kirbee's associate Rev. John Landrum. By 1830, Kirbee and his family had relocated to Georgia; and by 1840, they had migrated to Montgomery County, Texas. The kiln itself was likely built around 1849, as it appeared in the 1850 Schedule of Industry and Manufacture. James was likely assisted by his sons M.J. and Louis. The annual value of the stoneware produced did not exceed $500, much lower than other local kilns. The kiln likely ceased operations in the 1860s.

The site was one of several kilns surveyed by the Texas Historical Commission between 1973 and 1974. It was listed on the National Register of Historic Places on August 28, 1973. It was the first site from in the area to be added to the NRHP.

== Architecture and pottery ==
At the time of the archaeological surveys in the 1970s, the Texas Historical Commission named the Kirbee Kiln Site as the largest groundhog kiln that had then been excavated in Texas, and it remains one of the largest ever recorded in the American South. It measured 39 feet (12 m) across and 8 to 10 inches wide and was constructed of brick. The kiln was rectangular in shape, consisting of an opening at the very front for loading and firing, a depressed firebox, the loading shelf in the middle, and a fireplace-shaped chimney at the very back. A unique feature of this kiln was the presence of a second firing box located midway along the loading shelf; a side door would have provided access. The chimney is believed by the excavators to have decreased in width towards its top. The buttresses of the Kirbee Kiln were large and angled but also included several smaller ones, a rare feature that could have functioned to support its size, offer resistance against the sloped ground, and double as a retaining wall. The entire floor of the kiln was sandy soil.

Kirbee's stoneware had similarities to techniques observed elsewhere in Georgia and South Carolina, particularly the alkaline glaze that was characteristic of contemporary Edgefield stoneware; and the vessels were also comparable in features such as their handles and shape. This style of pottery is very similar to Catawba Valley Pottery, which was developed in nearby North Carolina. The trademarks on the Kirbee stoneware were a round stamp resembling the letter "O".
