= Governor William Owsley House =

Historic house in Kentucky, United States

- U.S. National Register of Historic Places
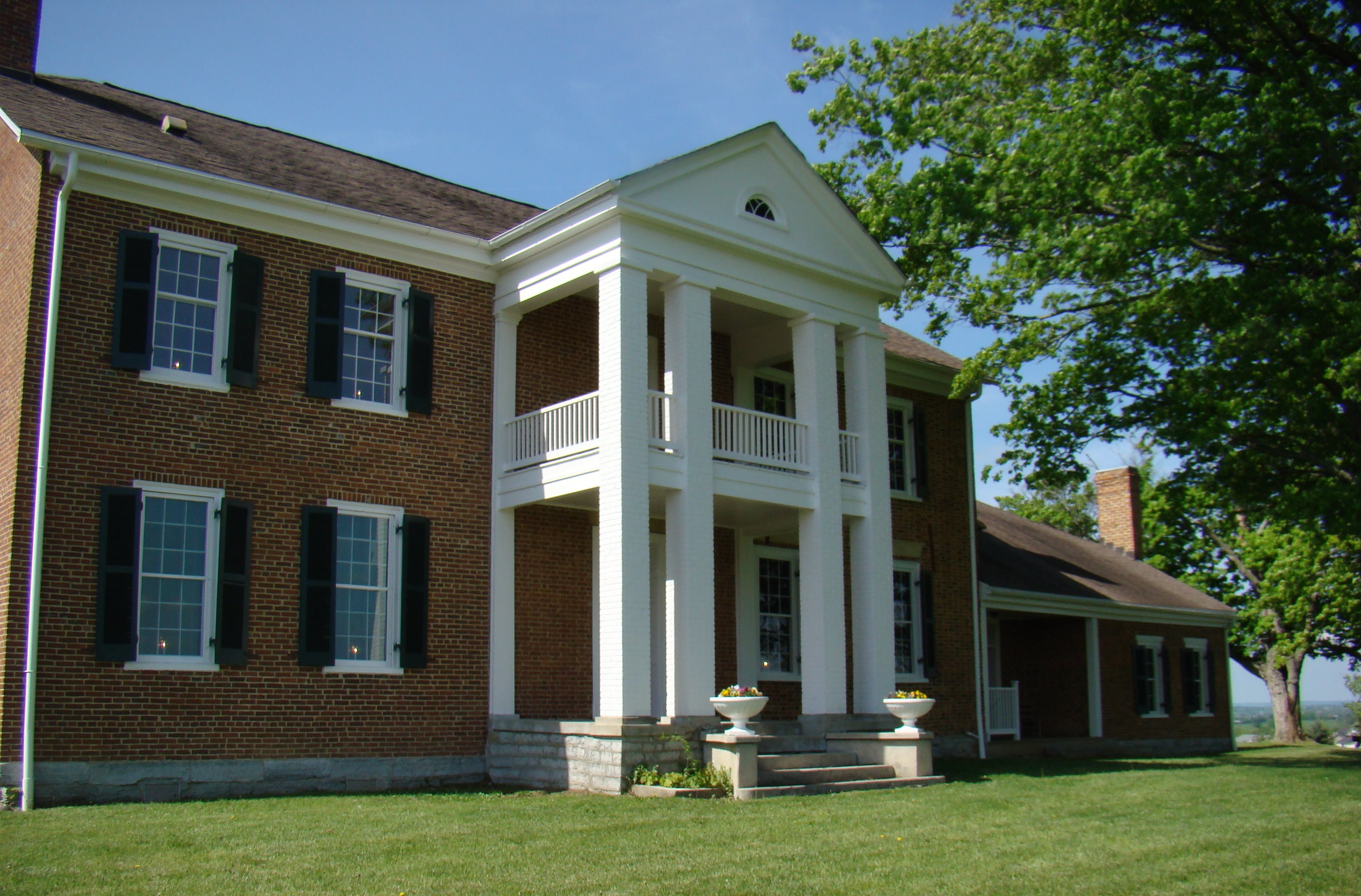
- Governor William Owsley House

- Location within Kentucky Location within the United States
- Nearest city: Lancaster, Kentucky
- Coordinates: 37°36′31.6″N 84°34′48.4″W
- Area: 4 acres (1.6 ha)
- Built: 1804
- Architectural style: Federal-style
- NRHP reference No.: 75000763
- Added to NRHP: May 6, 1975

Governor William Owsley House, also known as Pleasant Retreat, is a historic house located in Lancaster, Kentucky on U.S. 27. The house was the home of Kentucky Governor William Owsley. The property has been restored and is now a museum.

== History ==
The three-story Federal-style house was built in 1804.

== Current ==
The house was added to the U.S. National Register of Historic Places in 1975.

In April 1994, the Garrard County Historical Society purchased the property; and after restoration, Pleasant Retreat opened as a museum in June 1997. It is now (2021) currently owned by a Garrard County local couple. They own the restaurant next to it, they have murder mysteries and hold teas at the mansion to uphold its classic and historic background.
