= Garrard County High School =

Coordinates: 37.602°N 84.570°W

- 599 Industry Road; Lancaster, Kentucky 40444; United States

Information
- Type: Public high school
- School district: Garrard County Schools
- Principal: Michael Anderson
- Faculty: 51.09 (FTE)
- Grades: 9-12
- Enrollment: 801 (2022-2023)
- Student to teacher ratio: 15.68
- Color
- Team name: Golden Lions
- Rival: Lincoln County High School
- Website: Official Website

Garrard County High School is a high school located in Lancaster, Kentucky, United States.

The school is no longer at its West Maple Avenue location, as a new facility was built in 2011. The new Garrard County High School is located at 599 Industry Road, Lancaster, Kentucky.

Garrard County is located in Kentucky's 45th district and 12th region and is a AAA school.
