= William Owsley =

Lawyer, legislator, and 16th governor of Kentucky

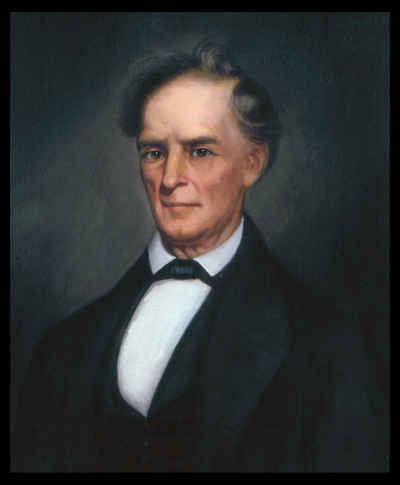

16th Governor of Kentucky
- In office September 4, 1844 – September 6, 1848
- Lieutenant: Archibald Dixon
- Preceded by: Robert P. Letcher
- Succeeded by: John J. Crittenden

23rd Secretary of State of Kentucky
- In office March 1835 – February 1836
- Governor: James Turner Morehead
- Preceded by: John J. Crittenden
- Succeeded by: Austin P. Cox

Member of the Kentucky House of Representatives
- In office 1810-1811

Personal details
- Born: March 24, 1782 Virginia, US
- Died: December 9, 1862 (aged 80) Boyle County, Kentucky, US
- Resting place: Bellevue Cemetery, Danville, Kentucky, US
- Party: Whig
- Spouse: Elizabeth Gill
- Occupation: Teacher, Surveyor
- Profession: Lawyer

William Owsley (March 24, 1782 – December 9, 1862) was an American politician and judge who was the 16th governor of Kentucky from 1844 to 1848. He also served in both houses of the Kentucky General Assembly and was Kentucky Secretary of State under Governor James Turner Morehead.

Owsley studied law under John Boyle. After briefly serving in the state legislature, he was appointed by Governor Charles Scott to serve alongside Boyle on the Kentucky Court of Appeals. During his service on the court, Owsley was involved in the Old Court – New Court controversy. In 1824, the state legislature, unhappy with the court's rulings against debt relief legislation, attempted to abolish the court and replace it with a new court. For a time, both courts operated simultaneously, and both claimed to be the court of last resort in the state. Supporters of the old court won control of the legislature and abolished the new court in 1826. Owsley resigned from the Court of Appeals two years later.

In 1831, Owsley returned to the state legislature, where he served until Governor Morehead appointed him secretary of state in 1834. He resumed his legal practice in 1836 and in 1843, retired from that profession. The next year, he was nominated for governor on the Whig ticket and defeated William O. Butler in the general election. Through fiscally conservative policies, he was able to reduce the state's debt. In spite of his opposition to the Mexican–American War, large numbers of Kentucky's citizens volunteered for military service. Owsley's popularity declined sharply when he attempted to remove Benjamin Hardin as Secretary of State. Hardin successfully challenged his removal in court, then resigned in protest of Owsley's actions and charged him with practicing nepotism in his appointments. After his term as governor, Owsley never again sought public office. He died December 9, 1862, and was buried in Belleview Cemetery in Danville, Kentucky.

== Early life ==
William Owsley was born March 24, 1782, in Virginia. He was the third of thirteen children born to William and Catherine (Bolin) Owsley. Owsley was a first cousin to U.S. Representative Bryan Owsley, whose father Anthony was the elder William Owsley's brother. In 1783, his family relocated to Lincoln County, Kentucky, settling between the settlements of Crab Orchard and Stanford. He was of English ancestry. Owsley was dedicated to his studies in the public schools of the area, and obtained a better education than most of his peers. On March 30, 1802, he was appointed adjutant of the 26th Regiment of the Kentucky Militia.

For a time, Owsley taught at a country school, and in 1803, he married Elizabeth Gill, one of his students. Gill was almost seventeen; Owsley was twenty-one. The couple had six children. During his time as a teacher, Owsley also studied surveying and eventually became a deputy surveyor. Later, he served as a deputy sheriff under his father, who was High Sheriff of Lincoln County. While in this capacity, he attracted the attention of John Boyle, who offered Owsley the use of his library. Owsley availed himself of this opportunity, and read law with Boyle. In 1809, Owsley opened a legal practice in Garrard County.

== Kentucky Court of Appeals ==
Owsley's political career began in 1809 when he was elected to the Kentucky House of Representatives, serving one term. Governor Charles Scott appointed him to the Kentucky Court of Appeals in 1810, where he served alongside his teacher, John Boyle. Soon after Owsley's appointment, the legislature reduced the number of justices on the court, and Owsley resigned his seat. He was elected to the state House again in 1811. When a vacancy on the Court of Appeals occurred in 1813, Governor Isaac Shelby re-appointed Owsley to the court.

One of the court's most crucial decisions during Owsley's tenure was in the case of Commonwealth of Kentucky v. James Morrison, which held that the Bank of the United States did not have the right to establish branches in Kentucky. The Supreme Court of the United States later overturned this ruling.

A second important decision in which Owsley was a participant was the case of Blair, etc. v. Williams, which invalidated the Kentucky Replevin Act of 1820. This law granted debtors a two-year grace period in repaying their debts unless their creditors would accept notes from the Bank of Kentucky. Owsley and his colleagues opined that this law was in violation of the Contract Clause of the U.S. Constitution. The decision was extremely unpopular with the Commonwealth's citizens, but it was re-affirmed by the court's opinion in the related case of Lapsley v. Brashcars and Barr.

Following these decisions, the General Assembly attempted to remove all three justices from their positions, but lacked the two-thirds majority required for impeachment. The Assembly then attempted to abolish the Court of Appeals and create a new one, beginning the Old Court-New Court controversy. The members of the existing court – Owsley, John Boyle, and Benjamin Mills – continued functioning in that role, while a new court of four pro-relief justices was organized by the legislature. For a time, both courts claimed to be the court of last resort in Kentucky, but by 1826, supporters of the Old Court won control of the legislature and abolished the New Court.

Having seen the court through the Old Court-New Court controversy, Chief Justice Boyle resigned in 1826. In December 1828, Mills and Owsley also resigned. Their resignations were an attempt to silence criticism from the defeated New Court faction that they held their seats in defiance of the will of the people. Old Court supporters hoped both men would be re-nominated and re-confirmed by the legislature, making the New Court's charge less credible. Accordingly, newly elected governor Thomas Metcalfe submitted both men to the legislature for confirmation, but the nominations were defeated in the state senate. Thus ended Owsley's tenure on the court. It was, at the time, the longest tenure of any Court of Appeals justice except John Boyle. Owsley returned to his legal practice, and his case load soon compelled him to move to Frankfort.

== Governor of Kentucky ==
Owsley returned to the state House in 1831, and served in the state senate from 1832 to 1834. He also served as a presidential elector for Henry Clay in 1833. When James Turner Morehead ascended to the governorship upon the death of John Breathitt, he appointed Owsley Secretary of State for his shortened term from 1834 to 1836. In 1843, Owsley retired from the practice of law and purchased a farm in Boyle County.

In 1844, Owsley was elected governor on the Whig ticket, defeating Democrat William O. Butler by a vote of 59,792 to 55,089. A fiscal conservative, Owsley reduced the state's deficit slightly, and was reluctant to rebuild the state penitentiary, which was damaged by fire. Despite his reluctance to spend, he urged the General Assembly to increase funding for public education. "Nothing but money will do it," proclaimed Owsley, "and it is left to the appropriate department – the legislature – to determine on the expediency or inexpediency of raising it." In response, the Assembly passed only a small tax to benefit public education. Education made progress during Owsley's tenure, largely due to his appointment of Robert J. Breckinridge as public school superintendent in 1847. Breckinridge is credited as the architect of Kentucky's antebellum educational system.

In 1845, Secretary of War William L. Marcy requested that Kentucky provide militiamen to bolster Zachary Taylor's forces in the new state of Texas. Owsley all but refused the request, but when word of Marcy's request reached the citizens of the state, they volunteered in great numbers and rushed to reinforce Taylor. Owsley was similarly lethargic in responding to Marcy's call for troops for service in the Mexican–American War. He joined fellow Kentucky Whigs John J. Crittenden and Henry Clay in deriding the conflict as "Mr. Polk's War". However, postal workers in the state opened Marcy's letter before delivering it to Owsley and had spread the word that the federal government had once again requested troops. By the time Owsley made the formal call for volunteers on May 22, 1846, an entire regiment of Kentucky troops had already been organized. Despite his personal opposition to the war, Owsley boasted in his report to Marcy that the Commonwealth had raised 13,700 volunteers, more than five times the number requested of him.

Later, Owsley's tenure would be marred by a conflict with Benjamin Hardin, his Secretary of State. Hardin believed that by supporting Owsley in the gubernatorial election, he would obtain some influence in Owsley's choices for other appointments. Tensions between Hardin and Owsley worsened as Hardin became increasingly frustrated with his lack of influence. On September 1, 1846, Owsley removed Hardin from his cabinet, charging that Hardin had abandoned his duties because he did not reside in Frankfort. Hardin challenged this premise for his removal, and when Owsley nominated George B. Kinkead to replace Hardin, the state senate voted 30—8 that no vacancy existed. The Kentucky Court of Appeals upheld this decision. Vindicated, Hardin then resigned, charging Owsley with practicing nepotism. In the Kentucky Constitution of 1850, the governor was stripped of his power to remove the Secretary of State from office.

Following his term as governor, Owsley retired to his farm in Danville, Kentucky, where he lived until the death of his wife in 1858. After this, he lived with his children until he died December 9, 1862. He is buried at Bellevue Cemetery in Danville. Owsley County, Kentucky, is named in his honor. Pleasant Retreat, his home in Garrard County during his early political career, is listed on the National Register of Historic Places.

Party political offices
Preceded by Robert P. Letcher	Whig nominee for Governor of Kentucky; 1844	Succeeded by John J. Crittenden
Political offices
Preceded by John J. Crittenden	Secretary of State of Kentucky; 1835–1836	Succeeded by Austin P. Cox
Preceded by Robert P. Letcher	Governor of Kentucky; 1844–1848	Succeeded by John J. Crittenden
