= Lancaster Commercial Historic District (Lancaster, Kentucky) =

Historic district in Kentucky, United States

- U.S. National Register of Historic Places
- U.S. Historic district
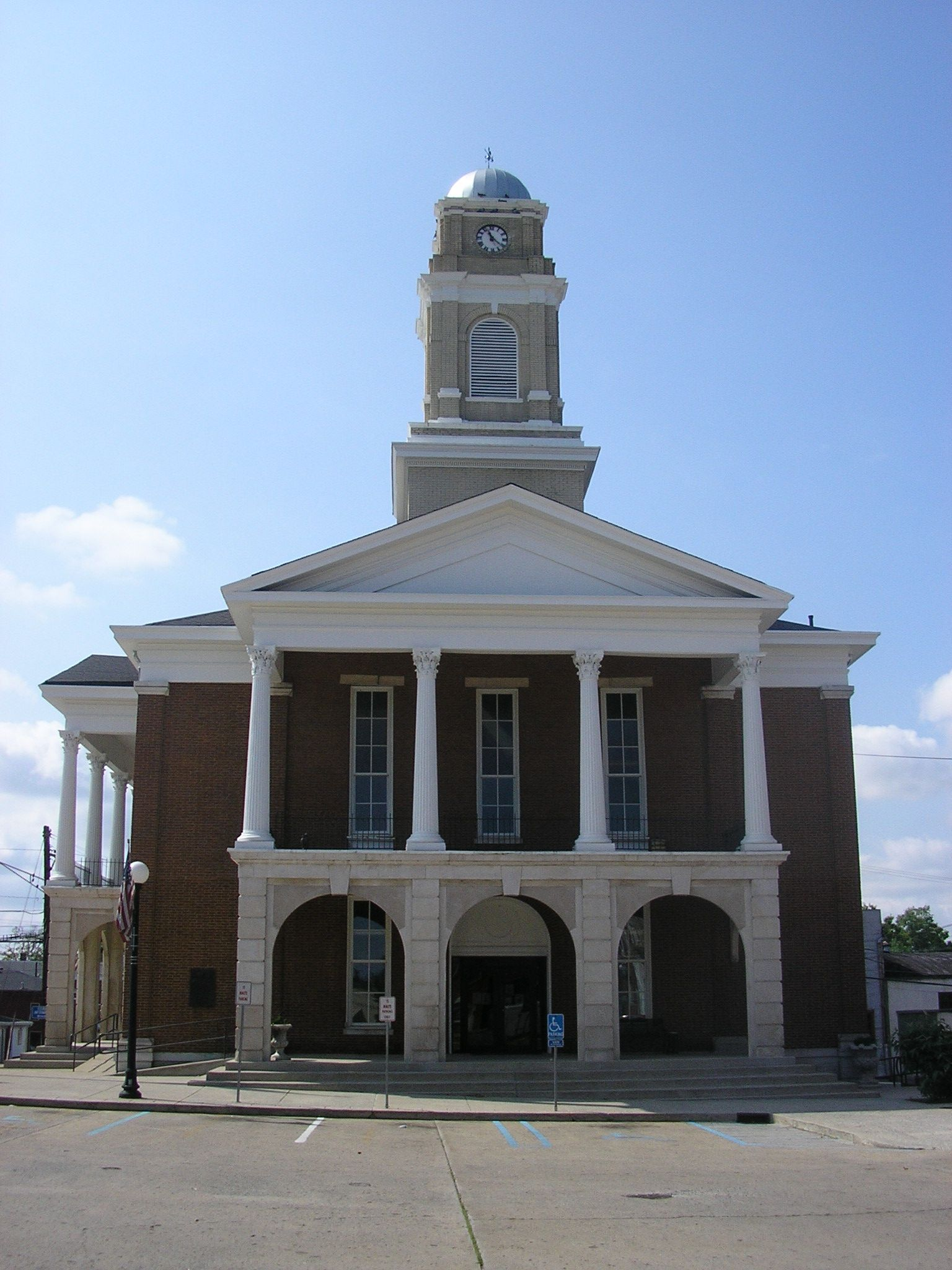
- The Garrard County Courthouse is the tallest building in the district

- Location within Kentucky Location within the United States
- Location: Lancaster, Kentucky
- Coordinates: 37°37′10″N 84°34′46″W
- Built: 1810
- Architectural style: Italianate, Federal
- MPS: Lancaster MRA
- NRHP reference No.: 84001461
- Added to NRHP: March 26, 1984

The Lancaster Commercial Historic District is a registered historic district located in Lancaster, Kentucky that was added to the United States National Register of Historic Places in 1984.

It includes the Garrard County Courthouse, built in 1868, which was the third-built courthouse of the area.

The district was deemed notable as containing "Lancaster's best contiguous collection of buildings illustrating Lancaster's commercial and architectural development. In a six block area there are Federal log and brick structures, Gothic Revival church, Italianate cast iron store fronts, Queen Anne bay windows, and symmetrical Classical Revival detailing."
