= Paint Lick, Kentucky =

Unincorporated community in Kentucky, United States

- Unincorporated community
- Paint Lick, Kentucky
- Location within the state of Kentucky Paint Lick (the United States)
- Coordinates: 37°37′0″N 84°24′34″W
- Country: United States
- State: Kentucky
- County: Garrard
- Elevation: 820 ft (250 m)

Population (2020)
  - Total: 3,154
- Time zone: UTC-5 (Eastern (EST))
  - Summer (DST): UTC-4 (EDT)
- ZIP codes: 40461
- GNIS feature ID: 500117

Paint Lick is an unincorporated community in Garrard County, Kentucky, United States. It lies along Routes 21 and 52 east of the city of Lancaster, the county seat of Garrard County. In 2015, a new route for KY 52 opened, bypassing the town. Its elevation is 820 feet (250 m). It has a post office with the ZIP code 40461. Historic sites within the community include Paint Lick Presbyterian Church (1879).

Paint Lick has been noted for its unusual place name. It was named for the creek that serves as a boundary between Garrard County and Madison County. According to some sources, the name was inspired by the rocks and trees painted by Native Americans to mark prime hunting spots for the animals who came to visit the salt lick.

== Education ==
Paint Lick is served by the Garrard County Schools. Paint Lick Elementary School is located in the community.
