= John Arnold House (Paint Lick, Kentucky) =

Historic house in Kentucky, United States

- U.S. National Register of Historic Places
- Location within Kentucky Location within the United States
- Nearest city: Paint Lick, Kentucky
- Coordinates: 37°36′45″N 84°28′49″W
- Area: 0.5 acres (0.20 ha)
- Built: early 1800s
- Architectural style: Federal
- MPS: Early Stone Buildings of Central Kentucky TR
- NRHP reference No.: 83002777
- Added to NRHP: June 23, 1983

The John Arnold House, located off Kentucky Route 1295 in Garrard County, Kentucky, near Paint Lick, was listed on the National Register of Historic Places in 1983.

It is a one-and-a-half-story three-bay central passage plan dry stone house built in the early 1800s. It has a rare three-room arrangement (one of only two known in Kentucky).
