= Dalton House (Dalton, Pennsylvania) =

Historic house in Pennsylvania, United States

- Formerly listed on the U.S. National Register of Historic Places
- Location: E. Main St., Dalton, Pennsylvania
- Area: 0.7 acres (0.28 ha)
- Built: 1855
- NRHP reference No.: 78002410

Significant dates
- Added to NRHP: May 22, 1978
- Removed from NRHP: November 11, 2002

Dalton House was a historic home located at Dalton, Lackawanna County, Pennsylvania. It was built in 1810, and was a two-story, frame dwelling. It featured a two-story, full-length front porch with Stick/Eastlake style ornamentation.

It was added to the National Register of Historic Places in 1978. It was delisted in 2002, after being demolished in 1999.
