= John Waterman Arnold House =

Historic house in Rhode Island, United States

- U.S. National Register of Historic Places
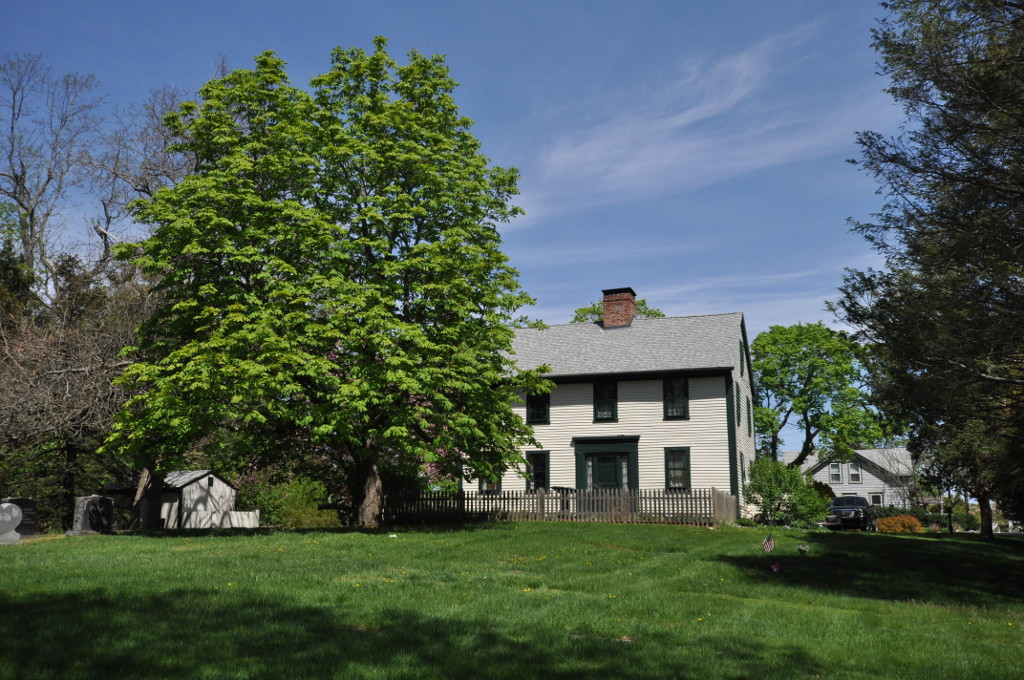

- Location within Rhode Island Location within the United States
- Location: 11 Roger Williams Ave., Warwick, Rhode Island
- Coordinates: 41°45′18″N 71°23′56″W
- NRHP reference No.: 71000013
- Added to NRHP: September 10, 1971

The John Waterman Arnold House, home to the Warwick Historical Society, is an historic house at 11 Roger Williams Avenue in Warwick, Rhode Island. Built in the late 18th century, it is a two-story five-bay wood-frame structure with a central chimney, and a two-story ell extending to the rear.

The home has a fireplace in its cellar, suggesting this area was once used as a kitchen. The main entrance has 19th-century Greek Revival treatment.

The house was listed on the National Register of Historic Places in 1971. The property is now owned by the Warwick Historical Society, and is open to the public.

== See also ==
- National Register of Historic Places listings in Kent County, Rhode Island
- List of historical societies in Rhode Island
