= Kentucky Route 39 =

Highway in Kentucky, U.S.

Kentucky Route 39
- KY 39 highlighted in red

Route information
- Maintained by KYTC
- Length: 61.425 mi (98.854 km)

Major junctions
- South end: KY 1247 in Somerset
- US 150 in Crab Orchard; US 27 in Lancaster; KY 563 near Cottonburg Kentucky River near Cottonburg
- North end: US 27 BUS/KY 29 in Nicholasville

Location
- Country: United States
- State: Kentucky
- Counties: Pulaski, Lincoln, Garrard, Jessamine

Highway system
- Kentucky State Highway System; Interstate; US; State; Parkways
← KY 38	→ KY 40

Kentucky Route 39 (KY 39) is a state highway in the U.S. state of Kentucky. The route, part of the State Secondary System, exists in two segments, separated at the Madison-Jessamine county line by the Kentucky River. While there is a boat ramp on each side, there is no bridge or ferry carrying vehicular traffic across the waterway. The southernmost terminus of the route is at Kentucky Route 1247 in Somerset. The northernmost terminus is at U.S. Route 27 Business and Kentucky Route 29 in Nicholasville.

The northern terminus of the southern segment is at Kentucky Route 563 in Garrard County 1.5 miles (2.4 km) south of the Kentucky River. Although KY 39 ends, the roadway continues north to the south bank of the river at the confluence of Paint Lick Creek; there is a concrete boat landing at the site of an old ferry crossing. The segment between Lancaster and the river is locally called Buckeye Pike. The southern terminus of the northern segment is at the boat launch on the north bank.

== Major intersections ==
County	Location	mi	km	Destinations	Notes
Pulaski	Somerset	0.000	0.000	KY 1247	Southern terminus
Pulaski	Somerset	0.200	0.322	KY 2296 south (College Street)	Northern terminus of KY 2296
Pulaski	Somerset	0.286	0.460	KY 80 (Hal Rogers Parkway) to US 27 – Somerset	Somerset to the east, US 27 to the west
Pulaski	Somerset	0.525	0.845	KY 1575 west (East University Drive)	Eastern terminus of KY 1575
Pulaski	Dabney	6.465	10.404	KY 635 west	Eastern terminus of KY 635
Pulaski	Dabney	6.816	10.969	KY 1317 east (Pine Hill Road)	Western terminus of KY 1317
Pulaski		9.207	14.817	KY 452 west	Eastern terminus of KY 452
Pulaski	Woodstock	12.809	20.614	KY 934 east	Western terminus of KY 934
Pulaski		14.382	23.146	KY 935 east	Western terminus of KY 935
Pulaski	Randy	15.128	24.346	KY 70 to US 150 / US 27	US 150 to the east, US 27 to the west
Pulaski		17.029	27.406	KY 3267 (Arnie Gentry Road)	
Pulaski		17.438	28.064	KY 328 west	Southern end of concurrency
Pulaski	Bee Lick	17.713	28.506	KY 328 east (Bee Lick Road)	Northern end of concurrency
Lincoln	Dog Walk	21.109	33.972	KY 618 east	Southern end of concurrency
Lincoln		21.691	34.908	KY 618 west	Northern end of concurrency
Lincoln		22.649	36.450	KY 3245 east	Western terminus of KY 3245
Lincoln		26.798	43.127	US 150 to I-75	I-75 to the east
Lincoln	Crab Orchard	26.965	43.396	KY 2750 east (Main Street)	Southern end of concurrency
Lincoln	Crab Orchard	27.483	44.230	KY 643 west (Elm Street)	Eastern terminus of KY 643
Lincoln	Crab Orchard	27.572	44.373	KY 2750 west (Stanford Street)	Northern end of concurrency
Lincoln		29.680	47.765	KY 3246 east – Fall Lick, Maywoods	Western terminus of KY 3246
Garrard		38.500	61.960	KY 1972 east (Crab Orchard Road)	Western terminus of KY 1972
Garrard	Lancaster	39.429	63.455	US 27 south (Stanford Street)	Southern end of US 27 concurrency
Garrard	Lancaster	39.438	63.469	KY 52 (Danville Road/Richmond Road) to I-75 – Danville, Richmond	Danville Road to the west, Richmond Road to the east
Garrard	Lancaster	40.354	64.943	US 27 north (Lexington Road)	Northern end of concurrency; 27 continues north while 39 turns east over Maple Avenue
Garrard		43.629	70.214	KY 563 east (Perry Rodgers Road)	Southern end of concurrency
Garrard		44.644	71.848	KY 563 west (Poor Ridge Pike)	Northern end of concurrency
Garrard	McCreary	45.713	73.568	KY 1131 east (Bethel Road)	Western terminus of KY 1131
Garrard		52.068	83.795	KY 563 south (Dave Simpson Road) / Buckeye Road	Northern terminus of KY 563; northern terminus of southern section of KY 39
Road continues 1.5 miles north to old boat ramp / former ferry crossing at the Kentucky River. KY 39 continues on the other side of the river
Jessamine		52.188	83.988	KY 1541 north (River Road)	Southern terminus of KY 1541
Jessamine		54.522	87.745	KY 1268 north (Little Hickman Road)	Southern terminus of KY 1268
Jessamine	Nicholasville	57.295	92.207	KY 3374 west (Hoover Pike)	Eastern terminus of KY 3374
Jessamine		59.618	95.946	KY 1541 south (Chrisman Mill Road)	Northern terminus of KY 1541
Jessamine	Nicholasville	61.472	98.930	US 27 Bus. (North Main Street/South Main Street) / KY 29 west (West Maple Street)	Northern terminus of KY 39; eastern terminus of KY 29
1.000 mi = 1.609 km; 1.000 km = 0.621 mi

== History ==
From 1958 to 1981 the southern terminus was located at US 27, via University Drive, this changed back to Kentucky 1247.
