= John Arnold House (Woonsocket, Rhode Island) =

Historic house in Rhode Island, United States

- U.S. National Register of Historic Places
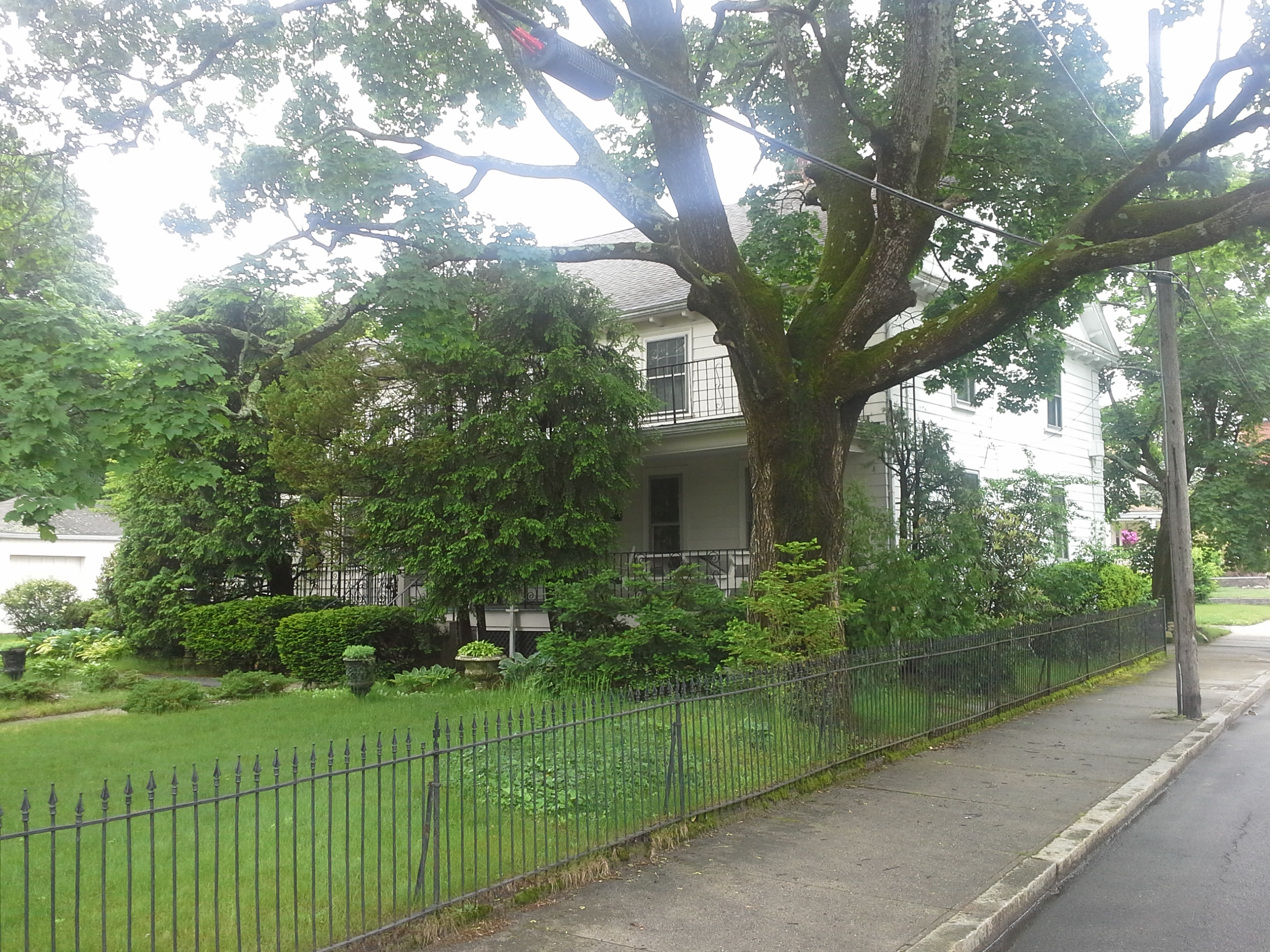

- Location within Rhode Island Location within the United States
- Location: Woonsocket, Rhode Island
- Coordinates: 41°59′41″N 71°31′22″W
- Built: 1712
- MPS: Woonsocket MRA
- NRHP reference No.: 82000132
- Added to NRHP: November 24, 1982

The John Arnold House is an historic house on 99 Providence Street in Woonsocket, Rhode Island. The main block of this two-story wood-frame house is conventionally believed to have been built in 1712, but there is architectural evidence parts of it may be even older. There are two additions: a two-story gable-roof section extending south (dating to the early 20th century), to which a mid-20th-century addition has been made. Elements of the house's antiquity remain in the main block despite its conversion to multiunit housing. The house is presumed to have been built by John Arnold, grandson of early Rhode Island settler William Arnold.

The house was listed on the National Register of Historic Places on November 24, 1982.

== See also ==
- National Register of Historic Places listings in Providence County, Rhode Island
