= Arnold–Simonton House =

- Formerly listed on the U.S. National Register of Historic Places
- Recorded Texas Historic Landmark
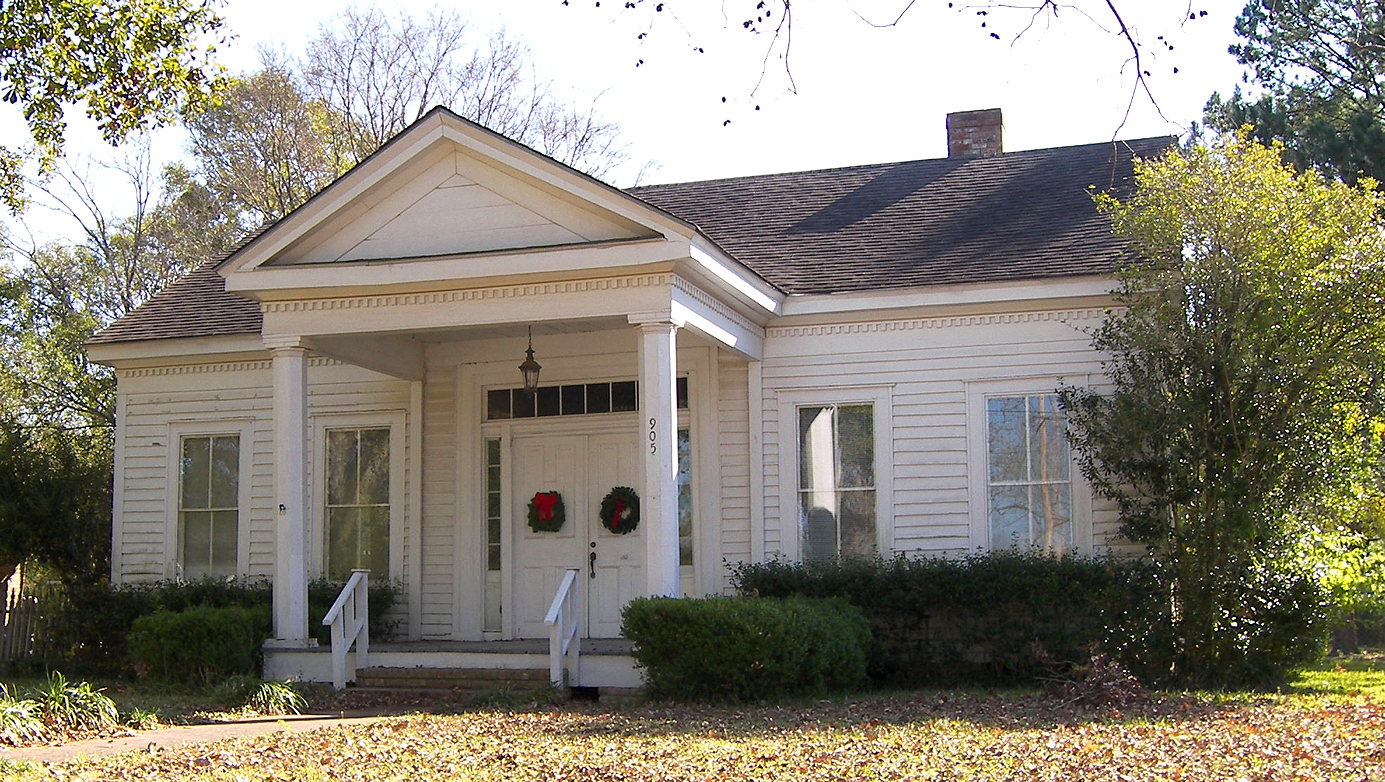
- Arnold–Simonton House in 2008

- Location within Texas Location within the United States
- Location: 770 Clepper Drive, Montgomery, Texas, United States
- Coordinates: 30°23′12″N 95°42′04″W
- Area: less than one acre
- Built: 1845
- Architectural style: Greek Revival
- Website: www.fernland.org/simonton-house/
- NRHP reference No.: 79002996
- RTHL No.: 7901

Significant dates
- Added to NRHP: December 11, 1979
- Designated RTHL: 1964
- Removed from NRHP: February 23, 2015

The Arnold–Simonton House is a historic house in Montgomery, Texas, United States. Built in 1845 by Epaphras Joseph Arnold, it is the oldest house in Montgomery. It became a Recorded Texas Historic Landmark in 1964 as the Frontier Colonial Home and was listed in the National Register of Historic Places in 1979; however, it was delisted in 2015. Today, it serves as the museum for the Fernland Historical Park.

== History ==
Epaphras Joseph Arnold was a settler from Connecticut who arrived in Texas in 1835. He settled in Montgomery, working as a physician, and originally built a log cabin on the site before replacing it with the current house in 1845; the old cabin became his office. Arnold went on to become a member of the Medical Censors for the Republic of Texas, served as justice of the peace, and oversaw the establishment of Montgomery Academy.

Following Arnold's death in 1858, the house passed to his daughter and son-in-law, Ludie and Reuben Simonton. It remained in the Simonton family until 1976, when it was donated to the Montgomery Historical Society. The following year, it was moved to a lot on Rankin Street and was used as the Montgomery City Hall. It was later moved to its current site at the Fernland Historical Park, where it serves as a museum.

In 1964, it became a Recorded Texas Historic Landmark. It was listed on the National Register of Historic Places on December 11, 1979.
