= Dr. John Arnold Farm =

- U.S. National Register of Historic Places
- U.S. Historic district
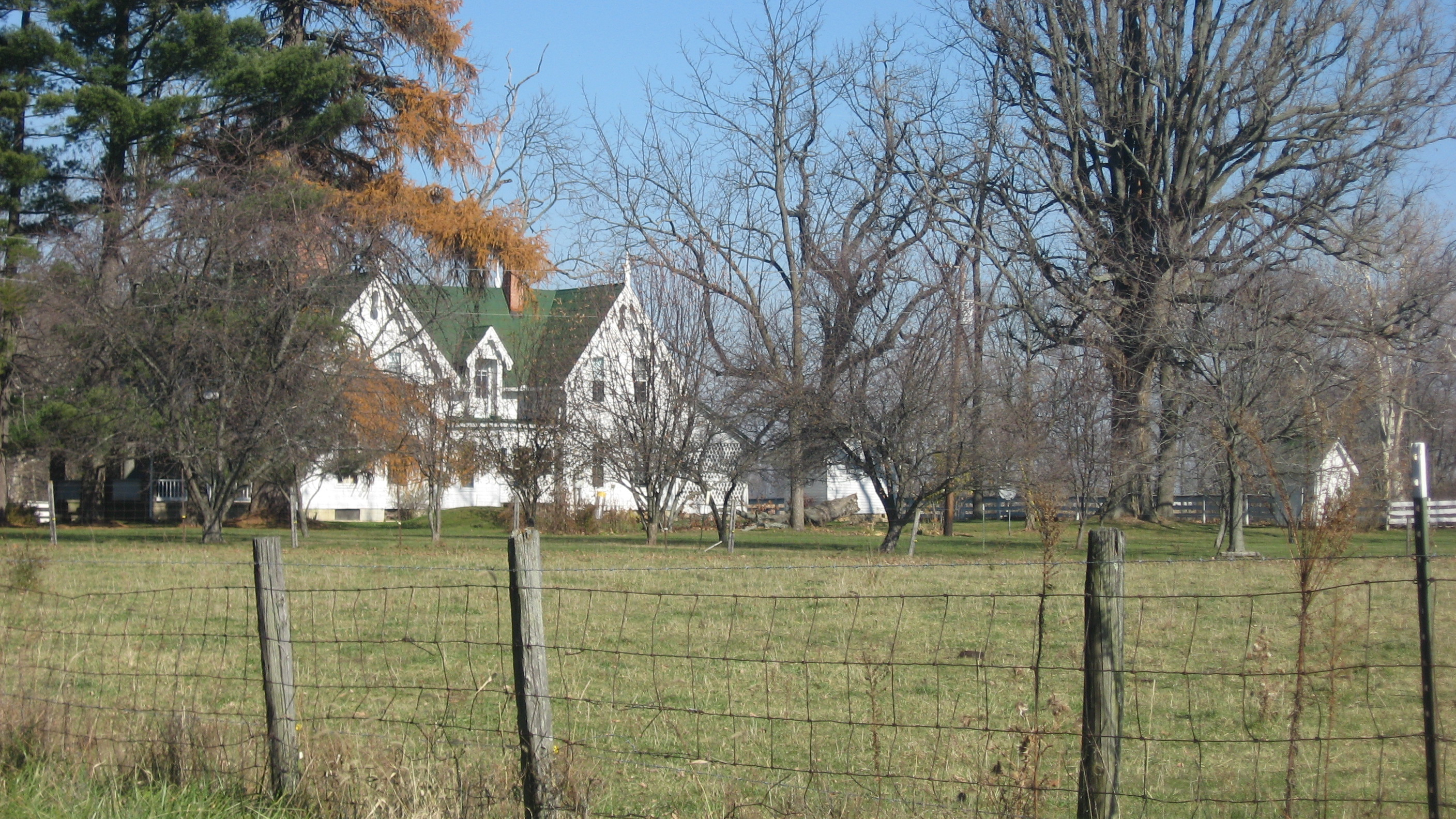
- Dr. John Arnold Farmhouse, November 2012

- Location within Indiana Location within the United States
- Location: West of Glenwood and northeast of Rushville in Union Township, Rush County, Indiana
- Coordinates: 39°38′14″N 85°21′30″W
- Area: 160 acres (65 ha)
- Built: c. 1820, 1853
- Built by: Smith, Tom; Smith, William E.
- Architectural style: Gothic Revival, Midwest three portal barn
- NRHP reference No.: 89001409
- Added to NRHP: September 14, 1989

Dr. John Arnold Farm is a historic home and farm and national historic district located in Union Township, Rush County, Indiana. The farmhouse was built in 1853, and is two-story, Gothic Revival style frame dwelling. It is sheathed in clapboard and has a five-gabled roof forming a double crossed "T"-plan. It features a wraparound front porch added about 1900, and a decorative vergeboard. Also, on the property are the contributing remains of an early settlement established in the 1820s, including the remains of the original John Arnold cabin, tomb, and cemetery. Other contributing buildings and structures include a smokehouse, milk house, privy, tool shed, buggy shed / garage, chicken house, granary, corn crib / shed, cattle barn, calf shed, and two additional corn cribs.

It was listed on the National Register of Historic Places in 1989.

== See also ==
- William W. Arnold (ornithologist), son of Dr. John and Sarah Arnold
