= Garrard County, Kentucky =

County in Kentucky, United States

- County
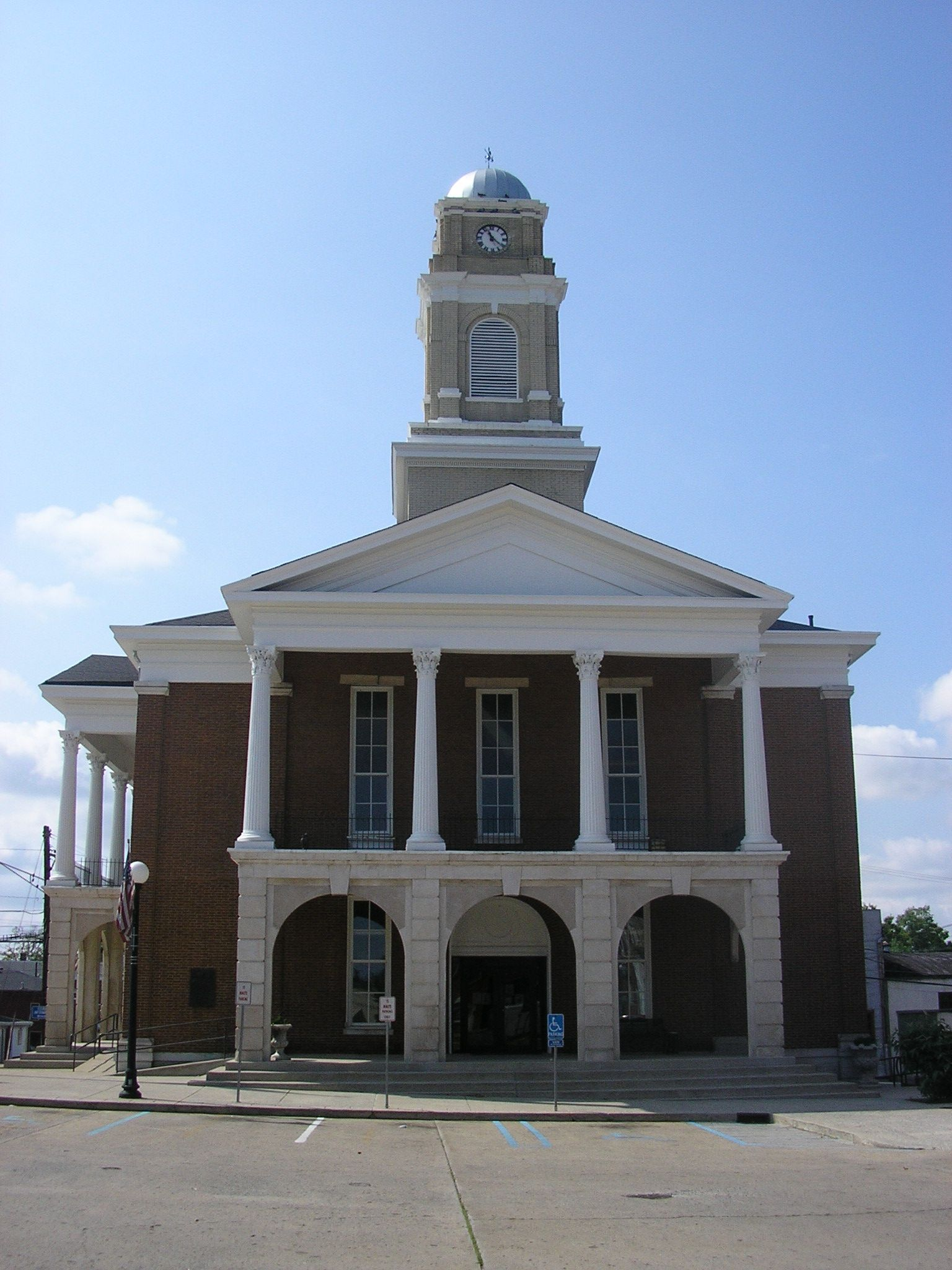
- Garrard County Courthouse in Lancaster

- Location within the U.S. state of Kentucky
- Coordinates: 37°38′22″N 84°32′15″W
- Country: United States
- State: Kentucky
- Founded: December 17, 1796
- Named for: James Garrard
- Seat: Lancaster
- Largest city: Lancaster

Government
  - Judge/Executive: Chris Elleman (R)

Area
  - Total: 234 sq mi (610 km^{2})
  - Land: 230 sq mi (600 km^{2})
  - Water: 3.9 sq mi (10 km^{2}) 1.7%

Population (2020)
  - Total: 16,953
  - Estimate (2025): 18,207 ▲
  - Density: 74/sq mi (28/km^{2})
- Time zone: UTC−5 (Eastern)
  - Summer (DST): UTC−4 (EDT)
- Congressional district: 2nd
- Website: garrardcountyky.gov

Garrard County (/ˈɡærərd/ GARR-ərd) is a county located east-central Kentucky. As of the 2020 census, the county's population was 16,953. Its county seat is Lancaster. The county was formed in 1796 and was named for James Garrard, Governor of Kentucky from 1796 to 1804. One of the earliest settlers was Harman Back Jr. (1737–1797). He, his wife Katherine, and their three sons (Joseph, Harman Jr., and Jacob) had migrated there, in 1789, from Little Fork, Virginia.

It was a prohibition or dry county until November 7, 2023, when voters approved to allow alcohol sales countywide.

Lancaster was founded as a collection of log cabins in 1776 near a spring that later provided a constant source of water to early pioneers. It is one of the oldest cities in the Commonwealth. Boonesborough, 25 miles to the east, was founded by Daniel Boone in 1775. Lexington, 28 miles to the north, was founded in 1775. Stanford, originally known as St. Asaph, is 10 miles south of Lancaster. It too was founded in 1775. The oldest permanent settlement in Kentucky, Harrodsburg, was founded in 1774 and is 18 miles to the west. Garrard's present day courthouse is one of the oldest courthouses in Kentucky that is in continuous use.

== History ==
The area presently bounded by Kentucky state lines was a part of the U.S. State of Virginia, and was established as Kentucky County by the Virginia legislature in 1776, before the British colonies separated themselves in the American Revolutionary War. In 1780, the Virginia legislature divided Kentucky County into three counties: Fayette, Jefferson, and Lincoln. In 1785, parts of Lincoln County were divided off to create Mercer and Madison Counties.

In 1791 the previous Kentucky County was incorporated into the new nation as a separate state, Kentucky. This change became official on June 1, 1792. In 1796, a portion of the remaining Lincoln County was combined with areas split off from Mercer and Madison Counties to form Garrard County. It was the 25th county to be formed in the new state. It was named for Col. James Garrard, second Governor of Kentucky and acting governor at the time of the county's establishment.

Harriet Beecher Stowe, author of the powerful antebellum novel Uncle Tom's Cabin, visited the Thomas Kennedy home located in the Paint Lick section of Garrard County in her only visit to the South while gathering material for the book. The cabin that formed the basis of her novel was an actual structure behind the plantation house. In 2008, Garrard County officials announced their intention to recreate the slave cabin on the grounds of the Governor William Owsley House. However, in 2018 newspaper articles showed the proposed site abandoned and grown over; a memorial in another Kentucky county (Mason) was continuing to honor the memory and contribution of Stowe.

Garrard County is historically a Whig and Republican County. Its early political leaders were outspoken supporters of Henry Clay. It was strongly pro-Union during the Civil War and has remained a Republican stronghold in the Bluegrass Region which was, until recently, largely Democratic.

Garrard County is the home of Camp Dick Robinson, the first Federal base south of the Ohio River during the Civil War.

== Geography ==
According to the United States Census Bureau, the county has a total area of 234 square miles (610 km^{2}), of which 230 square miles (600 km^{2}) is land and 3.9 square miles (10 km^{2}) (1.7%) is water.

Located in east-central Kentucky, most of the county lies in the rolling hills of the Bluegrass region. The southeastern end of the county near the Cartersville community is in the Knobs region. Garrard County is considered to be part of Appalachia.

=== Adjacent counties ===
- Jessamine County (north)
- Madison County (northeast)
- Rockcastle County (southeast)
- Lincoln County (southwest)
- Boyle County (west)
- Mercer County (northwest)

== Demographics ==
Historical population
Census	Pop.	Note	%±
1800	6,186		—
1810	9,186		48.5%
1820	10,851		18.1%
1830	11,871		9.4%
1840	10,480		−11.7%
1850	10,237		−2.3%
1860	10,531		2.9%
1870	10,376		−1.5%
1880	11,704		12.8%
1890	11,138		−4.8%
1900	12,042		8.1%
1910	11,894		−1.2%
1920	12,503		5.1%
1930	11,562		−7.5%
1940	11,910		3.0%
1950	11,029		−7.4%
1960	9,747		−11.6%
1970	9,457		−3.0%
1980	10,853		14.8%
1990	11,579		6.7%
2000	14,792		27.7%
2010	16,912		14.3%
2020	16,953		0.2%
2025 (est.)	18,207	▲	7.4%
U.S. Decennial Census; 1790-1960 1900-1990; 1990-2000 2010-2020

=== 2020 census ===
As of the 2020 census, the county had a population of 16,953. The median age was 43.3 years. 23.2% of residents were under the age of 18 and 18.8% of residents were 65 years of age or older. For every 100 females there were 98.5 males, and for every 100 females age 18 and over there were 94.3 males age 18 and over.

The racial makeup of the county was 91.9% White, 1.8% Black or African American, 0.2% American Indian and Alaska Native, 0.3% Asian, 0.1% Native Hawaiian and Pacific Islander, 1.0% from some other race, and 4.7% from two or more races. Hispanic or Latino residents of any race comprised 2.7% of the population.

0.0% of residents lived in urban areas, while 100.0% lived in rural areas.

There were 6,584 households in the county, of which 32.0% had children under the age of 18 living with them and 22.2% had a female householder with no spouse or partner present. About 22.7% of all households were made up of individuals and 11.3% had someone living alone who was 65 years of age or older.

There were 7,254 housing units, of which 9.2% were vacant. Among occupied housing units, 76.8% were owner-occupied and 23.2% were renter-occupied. The homeowner vacancy rate was 1.3% and the rental vacancy rate was 5.6%.

=== 2000 census ===
As of the census of 2000, there were 14,792 people, 5,741 households, and 4,334 families residing in the county. The population density was 64 per square mile (25/km^{2}). There were 6,414 housing units at an average density of 28 per square mile (11/km^{2}). The racial makeup of the county was 95.75% White, 3.06% Black or African American, 0.13% Native American, 0.04% Asian, 0.43% from other races, and 0.59% from two or more races. 1.32% of the population were Hispanic or Latino of any race.

There were 5,741 households, out of which 33.40% had children under the age of 18 living with them, 62.60% were married couples living together, 9.40% had a female householder with no husband present, and 24.50% were non-families. 21.10% of all households were made up of individuals, and 9.50% had someone living alone who was 65 years of age or older. The average household size was 2.56 and the average family size was 2.95.

By age, 24.40% of the population was under 18, 8.10% from 18 to 24, 30.90% from 25 to 44, 23.60% from 45 to 64, and 13.00% were 65 or older. The median age was 37 years. For every 100 females there were 96.80 males. For every 100 females age 18 and over, there were 93.00 males.

The median income for a household in the county was $34,284, and the median income for a family was $41,250. Males had a median income of $30,989 versus $21,856 for females. The per capita income for the county was $16,915. About 11.60% of families and 14.70% of the population were below the poverty line, including 19.10% of those under age 18 and 17.00% of those age 65 or over.

== Communities ==
=== City ===
- Lancaster (county seat)

=== Unincorporated communities ===
- Bryantsville
- Buckeye
- Cartersville
- Davis Town
- Hyattsville
- Paint Lick

== Politics ==
United States presidential election results for Garrard County, Kentucky
Year	Republican		Democratic		Third party(ies)	
Year	No.	%	No.	%	No.	%
1912	481	17.33%	1,232	44.40%	1,062	38.27%
1916	1,628	53.78%	1,375	45.42%	24	0.79%
1920	2,994	54.74%	2,434	44.51%	41	0.75%
1924	2,592	54.63%	2,126	44.81%	27	0.57%
1928	2,862	62.34%	1,729	37.66%	0	0.00%
1932	2,276	46.84%	2,582	53.14%	1	0.02%
1936	2,252	49.66%	2,276	50.19%	7	0.15%
1940	2,148	49.75%	2,162	50.07%	8	0.19%
1944	2,042	53.46%	1,764	46.18%	14	0.37%
1948	1,890	51.12%	1,725	46.66%	82	2.22%
1952	2,398	55.37%	1,927	44.49%	6	0.14%
1956	2,311	55.92%	1,798	43.50%	24	0.58%
1960	2,759	60.78%	1,780	39.22%	0	0.00%
1964	1,828	46.45%	2,092	53.16%	15	0.38%
1968	2,205	56.15%	1,000	25.46%	722	18.39%
1972	3,143	67.49%	1,441	30.94%	73	1.57%
1976	2,045	51.28%	1,887	47.32%	56	1.40%
1980	2,585	57.70%	1,774	39.60%	121	2.70%
1984	3,284	67.21%	1,566	32.05%	36	0.74%
1988	2,681	60.18%	1,710	38.38%	64	1.44%
1992	2,359	49.18%	1,730	36.06%	708	14.76%
1996	2,540	58.11%	1,486	34.00%	345	7.89%
2000	4,043	69.43%	1,713	29.42%	67	1.15%
2004	4,784	71.85%	1,841	27.65%	33	0.50%
2008	5,118	70.98%	2,012	27.91%	80	1.11%
2012	5,310	75.03%	1,661	23.47%	106	1.50%
2016	5,904	77.45%	1,453	19.06%	266	3.49%
2020	6,754	77.58%	1,830	21.02%	122	1.40%
2024	7,086	79.47%	1,719	19.28%	112	1.26%

Garrard County is governed by the Garrard County Fiscal Court, composed of the Judge Executive, who is elected countywide, and five Magistrates who are elected in magisterial districts representing different geographic areas of the county. Each member of the Fiscal Court is elected to a four-year term, pursuant to the Kentucky Constitution. Magistrates are addressed by the honorific "Squire." The Fiscal Court is represented by the County Attorney. The County Clerk archives all court records and keeps the minutes of meetings.

Garrard County lies at the northeastern end of the historically Unionist belt of Kentucky, covering the eastern Pennyroyal Plateau, the southern tip of the Bluegrass Plateau, and the southwestern part of the Eastern Coalfield. Although it only provided a modest level of volunteers for the Union Army during the Civil War and had a very high proportion of slave owners amongst its 1860 electorate, Garrard County nonetheless came to form the northernmost border of the rock-ribbed Republican bloc of south-central Kentucky that includes such counties as Clinton, Cumberland, Russell, Casey, Pulaski, Laurel, Rockcastle, Monroe, McCreary, Clay, Jackson, Owsley and Leslie. The only Democratic presidential candidates to carry Garrard County since the end of Reconstruction have been Woodrow Wilson in 1912, Franklin D. Roosevelt in 1932, 1936 and 1940, and Lyndon Johnson in 1964, and Roosevelt only won by 24 votes over Alf Landon and 14 votes over Wendell Willkie. Since 1944, when Thomas Dewey defeated Franklin Roosevelt by 278 votes, Garrard has voted Democratic in a presidential contest only once.

=== Elected officials ===
Elected officials as of January 3, 2025
U.S. House	Andy Barr (R)	KY 6
Ky. Senate	Donald Douglas (R)	22
Ky. House	David Meade (R)	80

== Popular culture ==
- John Michael Montgomery's 1995 hit "Sold (The Grundy County Auction Incident)" was filmed at the Garrard County Stockyards.
- Portions of John Michael Montgomery's 1997 hit "I miss you a little" were filmed in Garrard County.
- Portions of the 1957 movie "Raintree County" were filmed in Garrard County.
- In 2009, Garrard Economic Development Director Nathan Mick and local filmmaker Parker Young produced a short video titled: "It's Garrard County" a community effort to introduce the county to the world using new media.

== Notable residents ==
- Simeon H. Anderson (1802–1840), United States Representative from Garrard County, Kentucky; son-in-law of 16th Kentucky Governor William Owsley
- John Boyle (1774–1834), member of the U.S. House of Representatives and Chief Justice of the Kentucky Court of Appeals
- William O. Bradley (1847–1914), American politician and lawyer, native of Garrard County, first Republican governor of Kentucky; second Republican U.S. senator from Kentucky
- Kenny Davis (1949–), American former basketball player, Georgetown College, 1972 U.S. Olympic Basketball Team
- Bradley Kincaid (1895–1989), American folk singer and radio entertainer, first major country music star in the U.S.
- Robert P. Letcher (1788–1861), American governor of Kentucky
- Eddie Montgomery (1963–), American country music artist with Montgomery Gentry
- John Michael Montgomery (1965–), American country music artist with Montgomery Gentry
- Carrie (or Carry) Amelia Nation (1846–1911), American temperance advocate, native of Garrard County
- Jody Payne, American singer-songwriter, guitarist with Willie Nelson for 34 years
- Cicero Price (1805–1888), United States admiral, commander of the East India Squadron
- William Owsley (1782–1862), lawyer, legislator, and 16th Governor of Kentucky
- Henry Smith (1788–1851), American-born Governor of the Mexican territory of Texas, early leader in the Texas independence movement

== Historical Sites ==
- National Register Listings of Historical Places in Garrard County, Kentucky
- Garrard County Historical Society, 208 Danville St, Lancaster, KY

== Attractions ==
- Wherritt House Gift Shop, Locally crafted and artisan gifts, books and more AND Garrard Arts Center, Art exhibits, art classes & art competitions, 206 Lexington Street, Lancaster, KY
- Garrard County and Lancaster Kentucky Celebration of America's 250th Birthday
- Garrard County Rural Heritage Tobacco Festival - Every September

== See also ==
- Garrard County High School
