= Lancaster, Kentucky =

- City
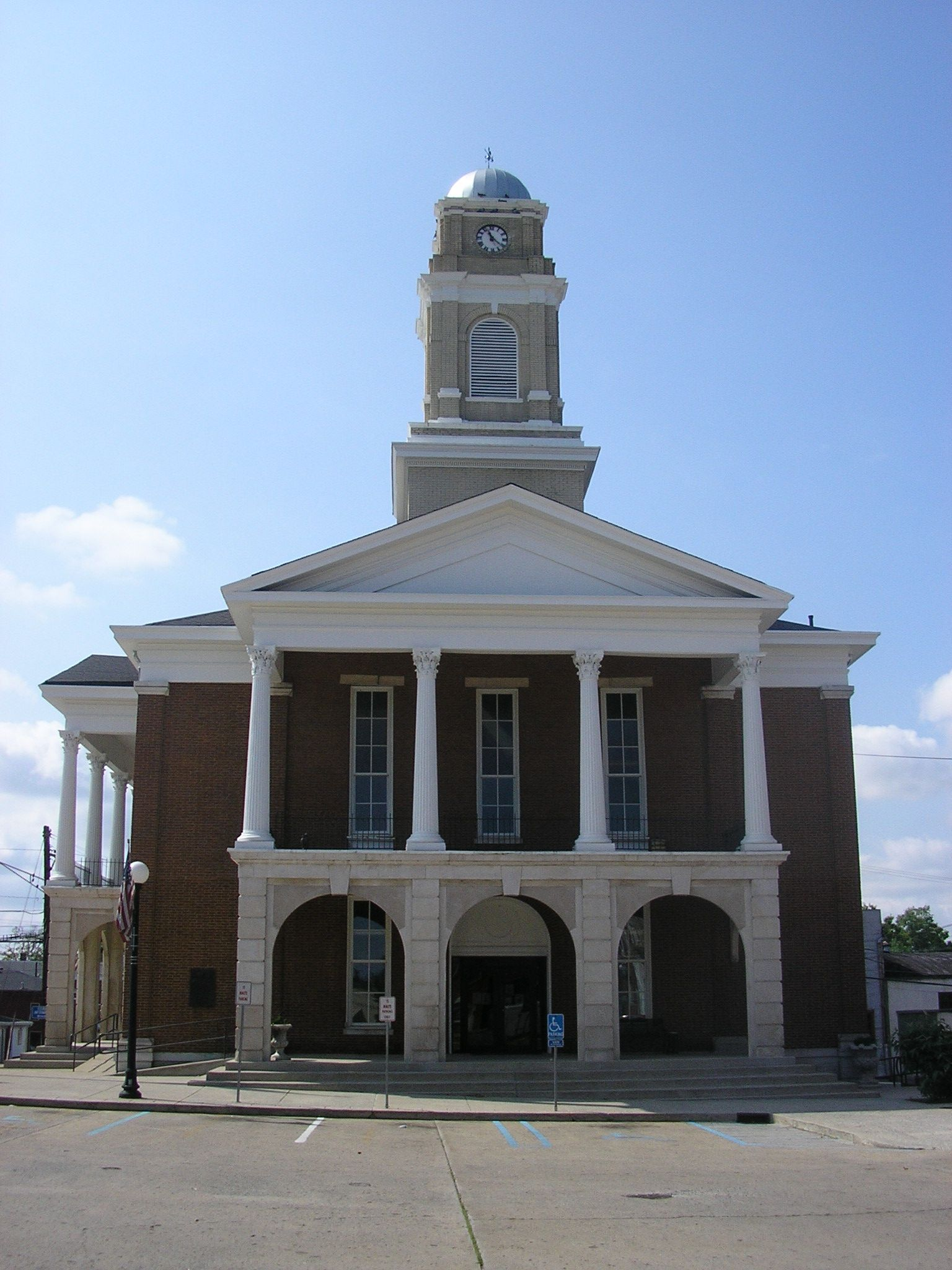
- Garrard County courthouse in Lancaster

- Location of Lancaster in Garrard County, Kentucky.
- Coordinates: 37°36′53″N 84°34′53″W
- Country: United States
- State: Kentucky
- County: Garrard
- Established: 1797
- Incorporated: 1837
- Named after: Lancaster, Pennsylvania

Government

Area
  - Total: 2.30 sq mi (5.96 km^{2})
  - Land: 2.28 sq mi (5.91 km^{2})
  - Water: 0.019 sq mi (0.05 km^{2})
- Elevation: 1,007 ft (307 m)

Population (2020)
  - Total: 3,899
  - Estimate (2024): 4,083
  - Density: 1,709.7/sq mi (660.13/km^{2})
- Time zone: UTC-5 (Eastern (EST))
  - Summer (DST): UTC-4 (EDT)
- ZIP codes: 40444, 40446
- Area code: 859
- FIPS code: 21-43840
- GNIS feature ID: 2404880
- Website: www.cityoflancasterky.com

Lancaster locally /ˈleɪŋkəstər/ is a home rule-class city in Garrard County, Kentucky, in the United States. It is the seat of its county. As of the year 2020 U.S. census, the city population was 3,901.

Located south of Lexington, Lancaster is the site of the Kennedy House, sometimes said to have been the setting for Uncle Tom's Cabin. The Civil War training base Camp Dick Robinson was located nearby.

== Geography ==
Lancaster is located west of the center of Garrard County. U.S. Route 27 passes through the city, leading north 35 miles (56 km) to Lexington and south 39 miles (63 km) to Somerset. Kentucky Route 52 crosses US 27 in the center of Lancaster, leading east and northeast 23 miles (37 km) to Richmond, and west 11 miles (18 km) to Danville. Lancaster is 3 miles (5 km) east of the Dix River, a north-flowing tributary of the Kentucky River.

According to the United States Census Bureau, Lancaster has a total area of 1.9 square miles (5.0 km^{2}), all land.

=== Climate ===
The climate in this area is characterized by hot, humid summers and generally mild to cool winters. According to the Köppen Climate Classification system, Lancaster has a humid subtropical climate, abbreviated "Cfa" on climate maps.

== History ==
In 1797, Captain William Buford donated land for the establishment of a town around the site of Major Andrew Wallace's settlement at Wallace Crossroads. The surveying and platting was completed over the next year by Joseph Bledsoe Jr., and the community was named "Lancaster" for the Pennsylvania town, either because one of its settlers came from there or because the town was designed on a similar plan. The post office was established in 1801 and operated under the name "Lancaster Court House" until 1811. The city was formally incorporated by the state assembly in 1837.

Lancaster was briefly occupied by the Confederate States of America before being expelled after the Battle of Perryville.

== Demographics ==
Historical population
Census	Pop.	Note	%±
1800	103		—
1810	260		152.4%
1830	570		—
1840	480		−15.8%
1860	721		—
1870	741		2.8%
1880	1,234		66.5%
1900	1,640		—
1910	1,507		−8.1%
1920	2,166		43.7%
1930	1,630		−24.7%
1940	1,999		22.6%
1950	2,402		20.2%
1960	3,021		25.8%
1970	3,230		6.9%
1980	3,365		4.2%
1990	3,421		1.7%
2000	3,734		9.1%
2010	3,442		−7.8%
2020	3,899		13.3%
2024 (est.)	4,083		4.7%
U.S. Decennial Census

=== 2020 census ===
As of the 2020 census, Lancaster had a population of 3,899. The median age was 39.1 years. 25.2% of residents were under the age of 18 and 18.2% of residents were 65 years of age or older. For every 100 females there were 86.0 males, and for every 100 females age 18 and over there were 79.4 males age 18 and over.

0.0% of residents lived in urban areas, while 100.0% lived in rural areas.

There were 1,548 households in Lancaster, of which 32.9% had children under the age of 18 living in them. Of all households, 36.8% were married-couple households, 18.2% were households with a male householder and no spouse or partner present, and 36.1% were households with a female householder and no spouse or partner present. About 31.3% of all households were made up of individuals and 15.1% had someone living alone who was 65 years of age or older.

There were 1,751 housing units, of which 11.6% were vacant. The homeowner vacancy rate was 2.5% and the rental vacancy rate was 7.3%.

Racial composition as of the 2020 census
Race	Number	Percent
White	3,337	85.6%
Black or African American	222	5.7%
American Indian and Alaska Native	16	0.4%
Asian	14	0.4%
Native Hawaiian and Other Pacific Islander	4	0.1%
Some other race	68	1.7%
Two or more races	238	6.1%
Hispanic or Latino (of any race)	152	3.9%

=== 2000 census ===
As of the 2000 census, there were 3,734 people, 1,585 households, and 1,020 families residing in the city. The population density was 2,100.4 inhabitants per square mile (811.0/km^{2}). There were 1,758 housing units at an average density of 988.9 per square mile (381.8/km^{2}). The racial makeup of the city was 88.14% White, 9.61% African American, 0.08% Native American, 1.12% from other races, and 1.04% from two or more races. Hispanic or Latino of any race were 1.96% of the population.

There were 1,585 households, out of which 29.1% had children under the age of 18 living with them, 45.2% were married couples living together, 15.6% had a female householder with no husband present, and 35.6% were non-families. 32.5% of all households were made up of individuals, and 17.1% had someone living alone who was 65 years of age or older. The average household size was 2.29 and the average family size was 2.89.

In the city, the population was spread out, with 23.0% under the age of 18, 9.6% from 18 to 24, 26.5% from 25 to 44, 19.7% from 45 to 64, and 21.1% who were 65 years of age or older. The median age was 38 years. For every 100 females, there were 83.5 males. For every 100 females age 18 and over, there were 76.6 males.

The median income for a household in the city was $26,175, and the median income for a family was $31,355. Males had a median income of $26,849 versus $21,108 for females. The per capita income for the city was $13,793. About 16.9% of families and 21.1% of the population were below the poverty line, including 27.0% of those under age 18 and 17.5% of those age 65 or over.

== Education ==
Public education in Lancaster is administered by Garrard County Schools, which operates Garrard County High School, Garrard Middle School, and Lancaster Elementary School within the city limits.

Lancaster has a lending library, the Garrard County Public Library.

== Notable people ==
- Simeon H. Anderson was a U.S. congressman from Kentucky.
- Elizabeth Fouse was an activist dedicated to gaining equality for African American women.
- William J. Landram was an attorney and the colonel of the 19th Kentucky Infantry; brevet brigadier general, March 13, 1865.
- William Owsley was a politician and jurist who became the sixteenth governor of Kentucky.
- Jonathan Shell is the former representative for House District 36 in the Kentucky House of Representatives.
- Lewis L. Walker was a U.S. congressman from 1928 to 1930.

== Historical Sites ==
- National Register Listings of Historical Places in Garrard County, Kentucky
- Garrard County Historical Society, 208 Danville St, Lancaster, KY (6) Facebook

== Attractions ==
- Wherritt House Gift Shop, Locally crafted and artisan gifts, books and more AND Garrard Arts Center, Art exhibits, art classes & art competitions, 206 Lexington Street, Lancaster, KY
- Garrard County and Lancaster Kentucky Celebration of America's 250th Birthday
- Garrard County Rural Heritage Tobacco Festival - Every September
