= List of Kentucky women in the civil rights era =

This is a historical list of women from Kentucky who were involved in civil rights activism from 1920 until the 1970s. This was a time period in the twentieth century when the civil rights movement impacted Kentucky's history of women and was enriched by Kentucky women. The civil rights era was one of the most significant sources of social change in the United States during the twentieth century.

The University of Kentucky administers an Open Knowledge Initiative on this particular time period in the history of Kentucky women that is hosted by the MATRIX at Michigan State University.

This list does not include any of the U.S. abolitionists (1790s-1860s) or those involved only in the woman's suffrage movement in the U.S. (1790s-1920) who dropped out of their activism once the 19th Amendment was ratified. Instead, this list showcases Kentucky women and their roles in civil rights efforts after the 19th Amendment (1920) - including actions to enhance civil liberties in the U.S. - and up through the first stirrings of the Women's Liberation Movement that emerged from the Civil Rights Movement. For this reason, this list of biographical entries of Kentucky women is limited to those women whose civil rights activism is somewhere in the time period that starts with the 1920s and ends with the 1970s.

== A ==
- Sophia Alcorn (rights of people with disabilities)

== B ==
- Anna Simms Banks (women's rights, African Americans' rights)
- Joyce Hamilton Berry (women's rights, African-Americans' rights)
- Sallie Bingham (women's rights)
- Joy Bale Boone (women's rights)
- Anne Braden (women's rights, African Americans' rights, workers' rights)
- Madeline McDowell Breckinridge (women's rights)
- Sophonisba Breckinridge (women's rights, juvenile rights)
- Mary E. Britton (women's rights, African Americans' rights)

== C ==
- Anna Mac Clarke (women's rights)
- Laura Clay (women's rights)
- Emma Guy Cromwell (women's rights)
- Peggy McDowell Curlin (women's rights)

== D ==
- Dolores Delahanty (women's rights)
- Alice Allison Dunnigan (women's rights, African Americans' rights)

== F ==
- Mary Elliott Flanery (women's rights)
- Elizabeth Fouse (African Americans' rights)

== G ==
- Audrey Grevious (African Americans' rights)
- Viola Rowe Gross (African Americans' rights)

== H ==
- Eliza Calvert Hall (women's rights)
- Josephine K. Henry (women's rights)
- Julia Britton Hooks (African Americans' rights)

== K ==
- Kidd, Mae Street (women's rights, African Americans' rights)

== L ==
- Katherine G. Langley (women's rights)
- Julia E. Lewis (African American rights)

== M ==
- Sara Mahan (women's rights)

== P ==
- Mary Virginia Cook Parrish (women's rights, African Americans' rights)
- Judi Patton (women's rights)
- Katherine Pettit (women's rights)
- Lena Madesin Phillips (women's rights)
- Suzy Post (African Americans' rights)
- Georgia Davis Powers (women's rights, African Americans' rights)
- Jeanette Brooks Priebe (women's rights)

== S ==
- Thelma Stovall (women's rights)
- Carol Sutton (African Americans' rights)
- Mary E. Sweeney (women's rights, juvenile rights)

== W ==
- Helen Cary Caise Wade (African-American rights)

== See also ==
- History of Kentucky
- Kentucky Women Remembered
