= Frank Stanley =

Frank Stanley may refer to:

- Frank C. Stanley (1868–1910), bass-baritone vocalist
- Frank Stanley (cinematographer) (1922–1999), American cinematographer
- Frank L. Stanley Sr. (1906–1974), publisher of Louisville Defender newspaper, political activist, civil rights advocate, drafted the 1950 legislation that led to integration of Kentucky's public universities.
- Frank L. Stanley Jr. (1937–2007), civil rights leader in Louisville, Kentucky, involved in efforts towards desegregation of public accommodations and the 1964 March on Frankfort which drew 10,000 activists.
