= Jefferson County Sunday School Association =

Church-based organization in Kentucky

The Jefferson County Sunday School Association was a church-based organization founded in 1925 in Louisville, Kentucky. It played a pivotal role in local civil rights activities and was part of the grassroots effort for anti-discrimination campaigns with an emphasis on employment opportunities for African-Americans.

== Origins ==
The JCSSA began as a religious education group. It wasn't until the 1930s that the organization began to shift its focus to job discrimination of African-Americans. This began with a particular instance when a Louisville phone company refused to hire African-Americans as employees, so Frank Stanley Sr. — editor and publisher of the Louisville Defender — urged readers to pay their phone bills with pennies. After this incident, the JCSSA initiated a drive to get the Louisville Transit Company to hire black drivers.

The JCSSA also held rallies consisting of various African-American religious groups and partnered with other organizations helping African-Americans, such as Operation Breadbasket. In 1939, the JCSSA health committee launched a campaign to create training facilities for nurses and doctors, in order to improve the health of African-Americans. Unfortunately, the campaign was soon abandoned because of disagreements concerning the leadership of the committee.

Interracial cooperation in Louisville during the post-war civil rights movement took the form of leadership by three overlapping coalitions: left-wing and labor unions, secular and government-sponsored agencies, and church youth groups. Various groups within each would gain more influence at certain periods. A few, including the JCSSA, were seen as being led by charismatic individuals who brought people out for protest campaigns.

== Reverend Daniel J. Hughlett ==
Reverend Daniel J. Hughlett was one of the prominent leaders of the JCSSA. He was appointed to lead the A.M.E. Zion Church located at 22nd and Chestnut streets in Louisville in 1930. Hughlett was a secretary under President Jackson, before turning the association into one that addresses race relations under his leadership. During Hughlett's thirty-year leadership as a pastor, the church became a symbol of hope in the community. Youth programs flourished under Rev. Hughlett's ministry, along with serving the economic, spiritual, and physical needs of the surrounding community.

In addition, during Hughlett's pastorship, the church started a Well Baby Clinic and a Credit Union as part of the ministry. This allowed the church to grow in congregation and building size. A basement annex was added for spiritual and educational activities, as well as for the use of meetings and special events by various community groups.

== Role of Louisville black churches in Civil Rights Movement ==
Many churches, along with the A.M.E. Zion Church, would advertise their services in the Louisville Leader and pastors would even write articles about their events. Churches would also come together and have meetings or conventions, especially among the pastors and their wives. Oftentimes, these women served as the backbone of the different church ministries, serving in smaller committees that planned various church-sponsored events.

Conventions held at different churches mainly served as a hub for spreading new ideas about ways to improve ministries and serve the community. In fact, activities and programs of churches acted as uniting mechanisms in the black community. Churches also served as a school for literacy and an instrument for social change. Members would not only worship together, but also gather together for protests.

An example would include a 1942 conference directed by Rev. Hughlett at the A.M.E. Zion Church, bringing together the directors of the Religious Education of the Madisonville District. He "explained the new religious education set up, as outlined in the 1941 discipline, and gave suggestions for making the church program serve the needs of the people in a larger way." Rev. Hughlett also participated in a debate at Trinity A.M.E. Zion Church titled, "which hinders the Negro most, his color or his conduct."

== Women's roles ==
Despite the majority of congregations and Sunday schools being composed mostly of women, men often held administrative positions in the church. Women were not left out of the association though. They often took interest in projects working to improve the church and the community. In addition, the pastors' wives sometimes formed their own committees to plan for church events. Many African-American women also served as Sunday school teachers in their churches, often educating adults and children how to read and write along with Biblical lessons. Sunday schools emerged for the sole purpose of increasing literacy in the black community.

Within the church, women also took charge of fundraising to support many African-American institutions in and outside of the church, such as businesses, newspapers, and educational institutions. Though there weren't many roles for women in the church, the positions they were allowed to take on provided them with organizational and speaking skills necessary in the development of various female associations and groups such as the NAACP. In fact, women often used churches as a launching point for activism because of the networks and support from the church family. In addition, older active women in the church were seen as "community mothers" who would care for people in the African-American community and other church members. These women were seen as a symbol of strength among women, though they were still under the authority of the men who filled the higher religious positions in the church.

== See also ==
- African Methodist Episcopal Zion Church
- Civil Rights Movement
- History of Louisville, Kentucky
- NAACP in Kentucky
