= R. S. Lewis Funeral Home =

Funeral Home in Memphis, Tennessee, U.S.

Coordinates: 35°8′7.6″N 90°2′57.53″W

R.S. Lewis & Sons Funeral Home
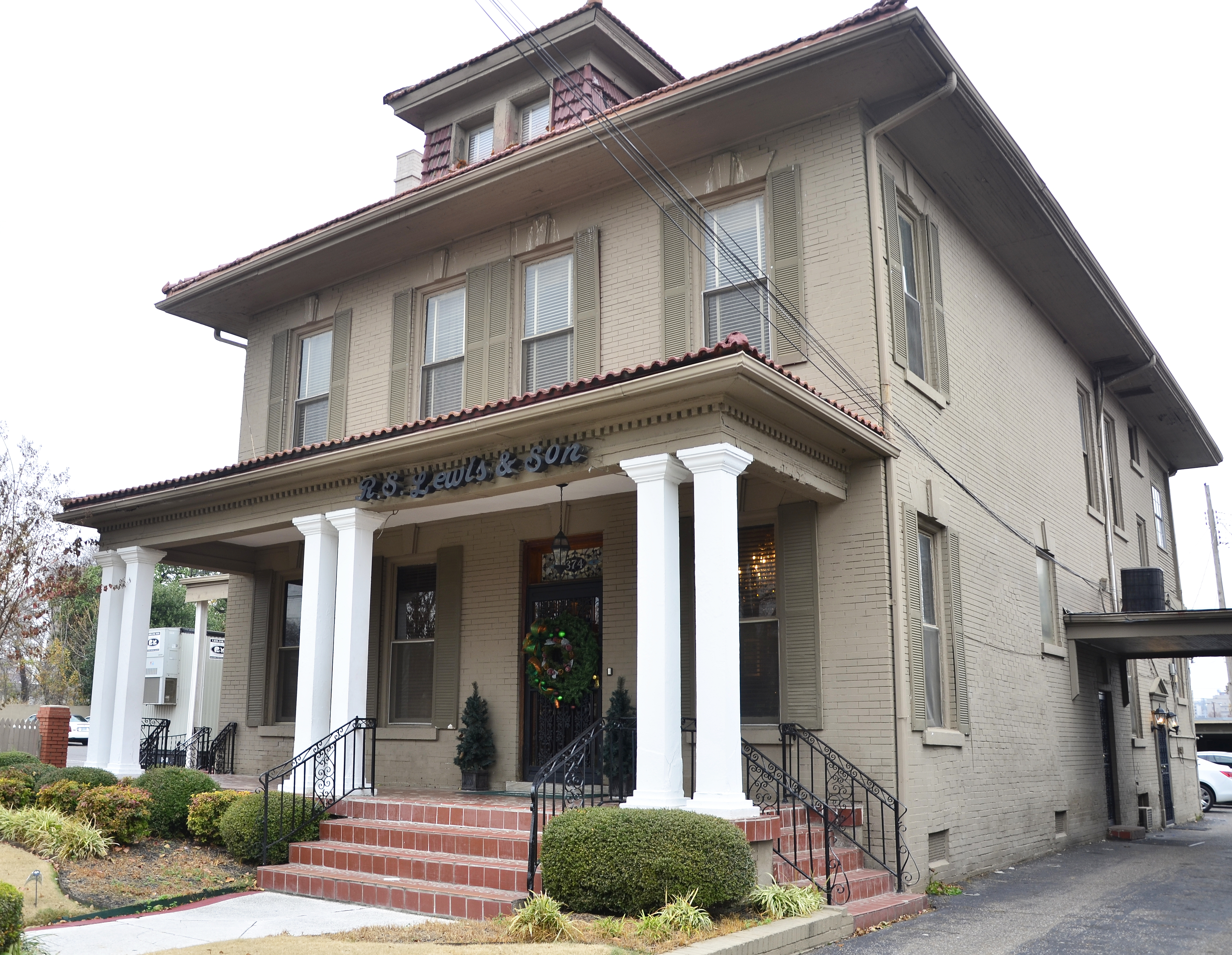
- R.S. Lewis & Sons Funeral Home
- Type: Private
- Industry: Funeral services
- Founded: 1914; 112 years ago
- Founder: Robert Lewis Sr.
- Headquarters: 374 Vance Avenue, Memphis, Tennessee, United States
- Number of locations: 2
- Website: rslewisandsonsfuneralhome.com

R.S. Lewis & Sons Funeral Home has operated continuously in downtown Memphis, Tennessee since 1914.

The home has held services for many prominent African-Americans, including Benjamin Hooks and Martin Luther King Jr.

The Lewis family was known for its civic leadership.

== Civic leadership ==
Robert Lewis Sr. opened the funeral home at the corner of Beale and Fourth Street in downtown Memphis in 1914. In 1922, Lewis purchased the Memphis Red Sox, a baseball team in the Negro leagues. He also financed the construction of Martin Stadium (sometimes called "Lewis Park") in Memphis. At the time, the city's hotels were racially segregated, and opposing team members were lodged at the funeral home.

Lewis' sons Clarence Lewis and Robert Lewis Jr. took over the family business. Robert Lewis Jr. became a business leader in Memphis, and was noted for his efforts at establishing T. O. Fuller State Park. Other noted achievements include advocating for the hiring of the first African-American firefighters in Memphis in 1955, being the first African-American appointed to the city's Alcohol Beverage Commission, and establishing the first Cotton Makers Jubilee.

== Martin Luther King Jr. ==
Martin Luther King Jr. was assassinated in Memphis on the evening of April 4, 1968. During King's visit to Memphis, the Lewis funeral home had provided him with a chauffeured limousine. The driver, Solomon Jones, an employee of the Lewis Funeral Home, was one of the last people to speak to King before he was shot, and also attempted to chase the shooter, to no avail.

After the shooting, King was taken by ambulance to the emergency ward at St. Joseph's Hospital, where he was pronounced dead at 7:05 p.m. Within an hour, his body was taken to the office of the Chief Medical Examiner at John Gaston Hospital, where Dr. Jerry Francisco performed an autopsy.

King's closest aides contacted Robert Lewis Jr. to retrieve the body and prepare it for viewing. The autopsy was completed at around 11:00 p.m., and at 11:15 p.m. King's body arrived at the R.S. Lewis & Sons Funeral Home. The assassins' bullet, as well as the subsequent autopsy, had caused significant damage to King's neck and face, and both Robert Lewis Jr. and Clarence Lewis labored through the night embalming, grooming and preparing King's body, while listening to crackling recordings of King's speeches. Ralph Abernathy commented "the body appeared unblemished. The morticians had done their job well."

King's primary wake was held on April 5 in the home's chapel, which filled with thousands of mourners wishing to view the body. King's casket was then flown to Atlanta for two more funeral services, which the R.S. Lewis & Sons Funeral Home co-directed.

== Change of ownership ==
Robert Lewis Jr. was director of the funeral home until his death in 2011. The home then operated under the leadership of Andre Jones and Richard Flowers, until it was purchased in 2012 by Tyrone Burroughs.

== Historic plaque ==
On the R. S. Lewis Funeral Home's 100th anniversary in 2014, a historic plaque was placed there by the Shelby County Historical Commission.
