= List of baseball parks in Memphis, Tennessee =

This is a list of venues used for professional baseball in Memphis, Tennessee. The information is a compilation of the information contained in the references listed.

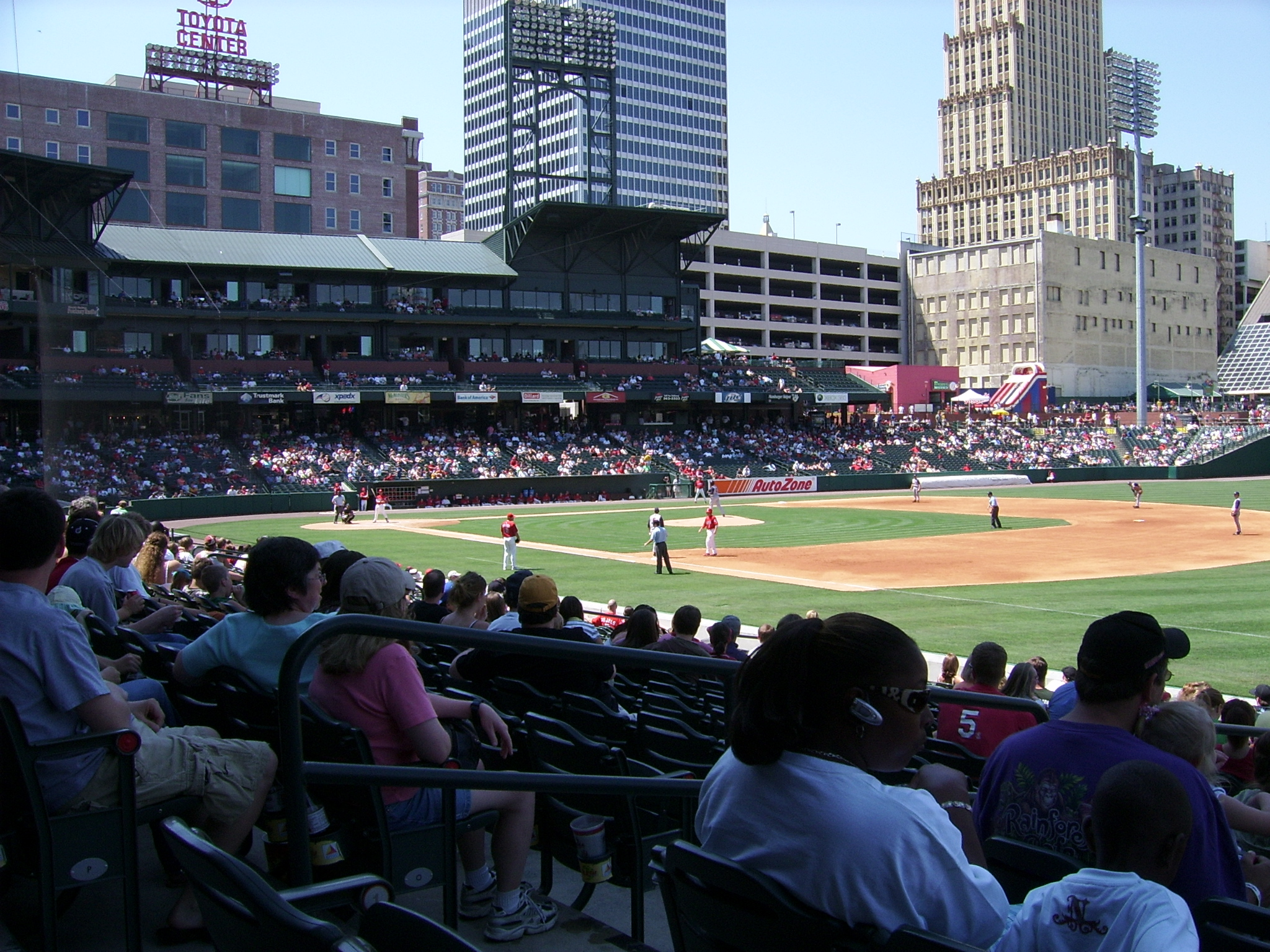
AutoZone Park

Central Park
Home of: Memphis Red Stockings or Reds League Alliance 1877
Location: "Dunlap Street, corner Marshall Avenue or Pigeon Roost Road"

Pigeon Roost Road (southwest, right field corner); Spring Street (south, first base); Middle Street (extension of Dunlap) (east, right field); Dubose Street (north, left field); Walnut Street (west, third base)

Currently: parking lot

Olympic Park later Citizens' Park
Home of: Memphis Reds / Memphis Giants / Memphis Leaguers / Grays / Giants SL 1884–1889, 1892–1895
Location: "North Side of Ohio Avenue (L. & N. Railroad); between Marley, Brinkley and Spring Avenues". Streets were renamed: Ohio became Autumn Avenue; Marley became Ayers Street; Brinkley became Decatur Street; and Spring became Galloway Avenue.
Currently: residential and commercial buildings

Russwood Park
Home of:

Memphis Chicks Southern Association 1901–1959 (destroyed by fire April 17–18, 1960, just before season opener)

Location: 914 Madison Avenue (south, home plate); Dunlap Street (west, left field); Jefferson Avenue beyond bordering buildings (north, center field); creek (later covered to make a parking lot) outside right field fence
Currently: University of Tennessee College of Medicine

Martin Stadium orig. Lewis Park
Home of: Memphis Red Sox NNL 1924–1925, 1927, 1929–30 NSL 1932 NAL 1937–1941, 1943–1950
Location: 476 Iowa Avenue (now E.H. Crump Boulevard) (south, first base); Driver Street and South Danny Thomas Avenue/Boulevard (orig. South Wellington Street or LaRose) (west, third base); South Lauderdale Street (east, right field); buildings and East Railroad Avenue (north, left field)
Currently: Truck terminal (Tri-State Truck Center is on NE corner) 494 East E.H. Crump

Hodges Field
Temporary home of: Memphis Chicks 1960, a few games after the fire
Location: 1030 Jefferson Avenue (south) – a football field a couple of blocks northeast of the Russwood site

Tobey Park
Temporary home of: Memphis Chicks 1960, remainder of the home schedule
Location: Central Avenue (south); South Hollywood Street teeing into Central from the south; Flicker Street (east)

Tim McCarver Stadium orig. Blues Stadium, also Chicks Stadium – opened 1963 as American Legion Park
Home of:

Memphis Blues Texas League 1968–1973 / International League 1974–1976
Memphis Chicks Southern League 1978–1997
Memphis Redbirds Pacific Coast League 1998–1999

Location: 800 Home Run Lane (east, right field); Raymond Skinner Drive (south, first base); Early Maxwell Boulevard (west, third base); Seelbinder Drive (north, left field); within the former Mid-South Fairgrounds
Currently: vacant lot (demolished 2005)

AutoZone Park
Home of: Memphis Redbirds 2000–present
Location: 200 Union Avenue (south, first base); South 4th Street (east, right field); Madison Avenue (north, left field); buildings and South B.B. King Boulevard (orig. South 3rd Street) (north, left field); less than two miles straight east along Madison from the Russwood site

FedExPark orig. Nat Buring Field
Home of: University of Memphis Tigers, Metro Conference 1972 – present
Location: East Getwell Loop Street (east, right field); parking lots and South Park Loop (north, left field)

== See also ==
- Lists of baseball parks
