= Funeral of Martin Luther King Jr. =

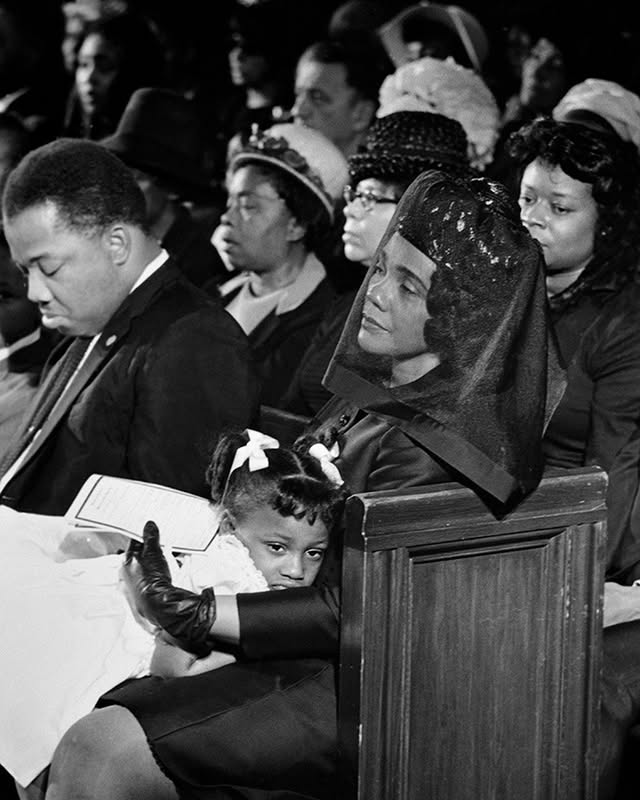
- Coretta Scott King at the funeral of Martin Luther King Jr., comforting their 5-year-old daughter, Bernice King.
- Date: April 9, 1968
- Location: Private funeral service: Ebenezer Baptist Church Atlanta, Georgia Public funeral service: Morehouse College Atlanta, Georgia

The first memorial service following the assassination of Martin Luther King Jr. on April 4, 1968, took place the following day at the R.S. Lewis Funeral Home in Memphis, Tennessee. This was followed by two funeral services on April 9, 1968, in Atlanta, Georgia, the first held for family and close friends at Ebenezer Baptist Church, where King and his father had both served as senior pastors, followed by a three-mile procession to Morehouse College, King's alma mater, for a public service.

President Lyndon B. Johnson declared a national day of mourning for King on April 7.

== Background ==
Martin Luther King Jr., a civil rights activist, Baptist preacher, and Nobel Peace Prize laureate, was assassinated on April 4, 1968, by a gunshot wound to the right side of his jaw, neck and shoulder in Memphis, Tennessee, where he had been leading a strike of waste management workers. The news of the murder sent shockwaves of emotion in many African American communities in a number of cities, resulting in deadly riots between the day of the murder and the day of the funeral.

A state funeral or lying in state was refused to King by then-governor of Georgia Lester Maddox, who had considered King an "enemy of the country" and had stationed 64 riot-helmeted state troopers at the steps of the state capitol in Atlanta to protect state property. He also initially refused to allow the state flag to be lowered at half staff, but was compelled to do so when told that the lowering was a federal mandate.

There were concerns that U.S. president Lyndon Johnson might be the subject of protests, over the conduct of the war in Vietnam, which would disrupt the funeral. Vice President Hubert Humphrey attended on his behalf.

== Service in Memphis ==
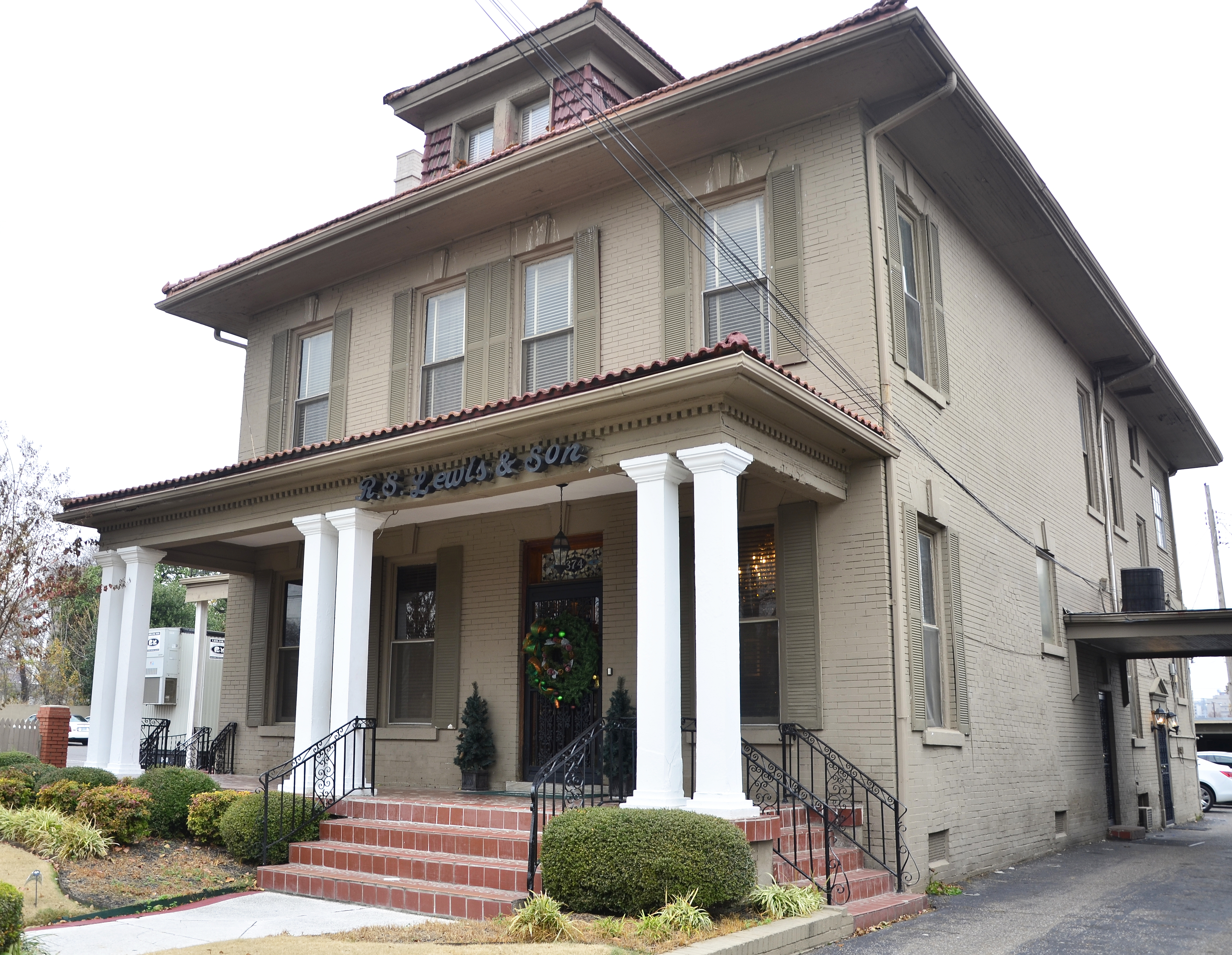
King's first funeral took place on April 5, 1968, at R.S. Lewis Funeral Home in Memphis

After the shooting, King was taken by ambulance to the emergency room at St. Joseph's Hospital and was pronounced dead at 7:05 p.m. King's closest aides contacted Robert Lewis Jr.—a local funeral director who had first met King two days prior—to retrieve the body and prepare it for viewing.

Coretta Scott King arrived in Memphis the following morning on a plane personally arranged by Robert F. Kennedy. Hundreds began arriving at the funeral home, where a viewing and memorial service took place. Ralph Abernathy offered a prayer, while tears streamed down Andrew Young's face. Time magazine wrote:

In Memphis, before it was carried south toward home, King's body lay in state at the R.S. Lewis & Sons Funeral Home in an open bronze casket, the black suit tidily pressed, the wound in the throat now all but invisible. Many of those who filed past could not control their tears. Some kissed King's lips; others reverently touched his face. A few people threw their hands in the air and cried aloud in ululating agony. Mrs. King was a dry-eyed frieze of heartbreak.

Later that day, police and National Guardsmen escorted the long procession of cars which carried King's body to the airport for the flight to Atlanta.

== Services in Atlanta ==
The first, private service began at 10:30 a.m. EST at Ebenezer Baptist Church, and was filled with some 1,300 people; among the dignitaries present were labor leaders, foreign dignitaries, entertainment and sports figures and leaders from numerous religious faiths. The service began with Reverend Ralph Abernathy delivering a sermon which called the event "one of the darkest hours of mankind".

At his widow's request, King eulogized himself: His last sermon at Ebenezer Baptist Church, a recording of his famous "Drum Major Instinct" sermon, given on February 4, 1968, was played at the funeral. In that sermon he makes a request that at his funeral no mention of his awards and honors be made, but that it be said that he tried to "feed the hungry", "clothe the naked", "be right on the [Vietnam] war question", and "love and serve humanity".

Per King's request, his good friend Mahalia Jackson sang his favorite hymn, "Take My Hand, Precious Lord" (the hymn that King requested to musician Ben Branch to play at a meeting moments before his assassination), though not as part of the morning funeral service but later that day at a second open-air service at Morehouse College.

=== Procession ===
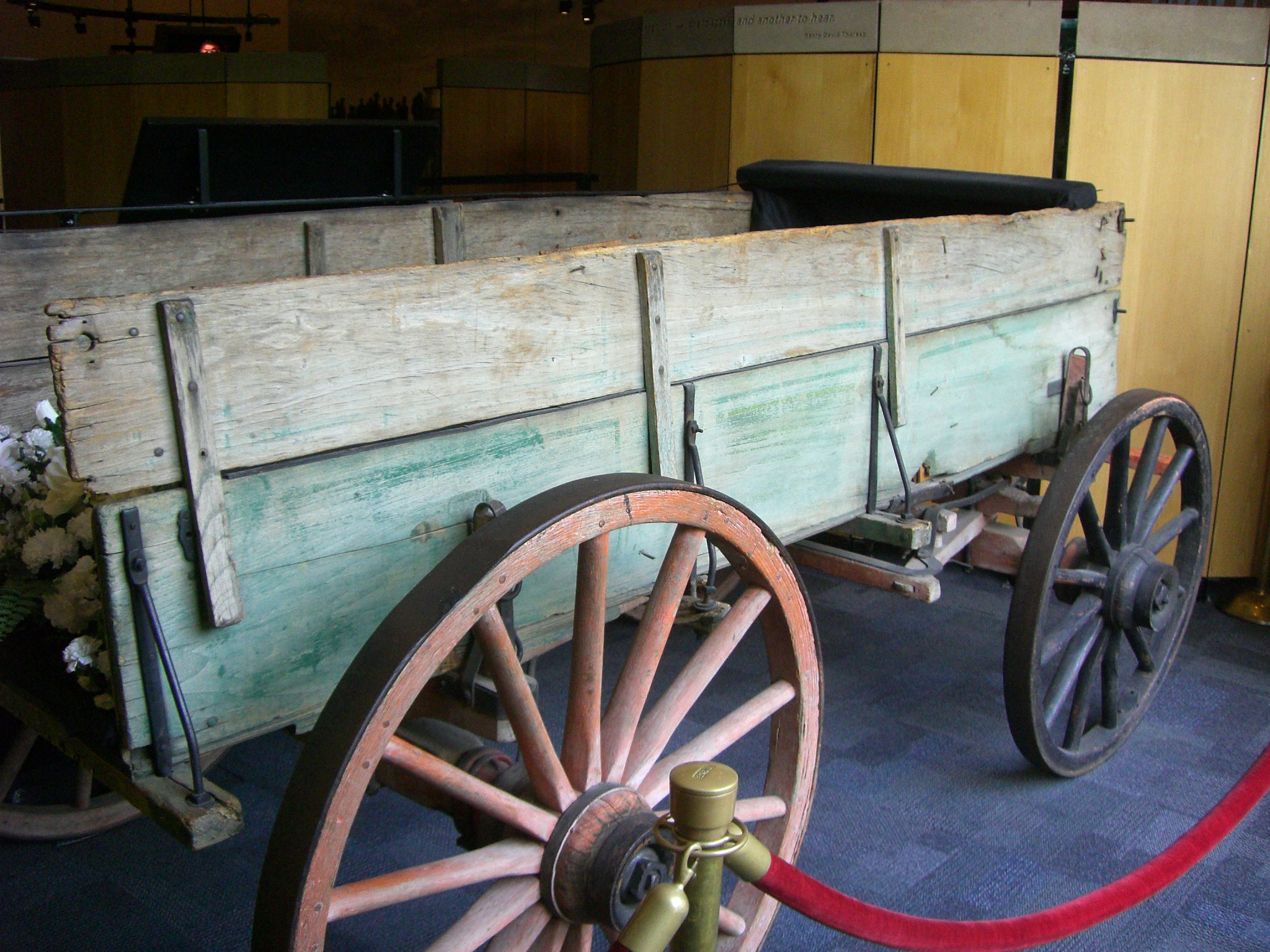
Funeral wagon at the Martin Luther King Jr. National Historic Site in Atlanta

The private funeral was followed by the loading of King's casket onto a simple wooden farm wagon pulled by two mules named Belle and Ada from Gee's Bend. The procession down the three-and-a-half miles from Ebenezer Baptist Church to Morehouse College was observed by over 100,000 people; the Southern Christian Leadership Conference commissioned a security detail to manage the crowd, while the Atlanta Police Department limited their participation to management of automobile traffic and to accompany dignitaries attending the events. The procession was silent, although it was accompanied on occasion by the singing of freedom songs which were frequently sung during the marches in which King had participated.

Among the persons leading the procession, besides the immediate family of the civil rights leader, were Jesse Jackson, who held the flag of the United Nations, John Lewis, and Andrew Young the future mayor of Atlanta and ambassador to the United Nations. Labor leader and civil rights activist Walter Reuther also participated in King's funeral procession.

The procession passed by the Georgia State Capitol building.

At the conclusion of the ceremony, the group sang "We Shall Overcome".

=== Morehouse ===
The public and final service was held at Morehouse College, where King was eulogized by college president Benjamin Mays, who had given the benediction after King's "I Have a Dream" speech.

Following the funeral, King's casket was loaded into a hearse for his final trip to South-View Cemetery, a burial place predominantly reserved for African Americans. His remains were exhumed in 1970 and reburied at their current location at the plaza between the King Center and Ebenezer, and his widow Coretta was buried next to him in 2006.
