= Louisville Leader =

Newspaper published in Kentucky, US

- Type: Weekly newspaper
- Owner(s): I. Willis Cole, Rosa Cole
- Publisher: I. Willis Cole, Rosa Cole
- Editor: I. Willis Cole
- Founded: November 1917
- Ceased publication: September, 1950
- Language: English
- Headquarters: 930 West Walnut Street (now West Muhammad Ali Boulevard) Louisville, Kentucky

The Louisville Leader was a weekly newspaper published in Louisville, Kentucky, from 1917 to 1950.

== History ==
The Louisville Leader was a weekly African American newspaper founded by I. Willis Cole in November 1917. By the 1930s, Cole employed twenty people and had a circulation reaching 20,000.

Cole died in February 1950 and his wife tried to continue to publish the newspaper until it eventually stopped that September.

In 1954, the Louisville Defender had called the Leader "one of the largest Negro newspaper organizations" in Louisville. View Jefferson County Sunday School Association for examples of how important this newspaper was in connecting various organizations and keeping everyone aware of local civil rights activities.

== See also ==
- History of Louisville, Kentucky
