= Julia Britton Hooks =

American musician, activist and educator

- Born: Julia Ann Amanda Moorehead Britton; May 4, 1852; Frankfort, Kentucky, United States
- Died: March 9, 1942 (aged 89); Memphis, Tennessee
- Resting place: Zion Christian Cemetery; Memphis, Tennessee
- Occupations: musician, educator, social worker, civil rights activist
- Spouse(s): Sam Wertles; Charles F. Hooks
- Children: 2

Julia Britton Hooks (May 4, 1852 – March 9, 1942), known as the "Angel of Beale Street," was a musician and educator whose work with youth, the elderly, and the indigent was highly respected in her family's home state of Kentucky and in Memphis, Tennessee, where she lived with her second husband, Charles F. Hooks. She was a charter member of the Memphis branch of the National Association for the Advancement of Colored People (NAACP), and her example served as an inspiration for her grandson, Benjamin Hooks, executive director of the NAACP from 1977 to 1992. Julia was also a leader for African-American women and active in the civil rights movement.

== Background and early life ==
Julia Ann Amanda Moorehead Britton was born in Frankfort, Kentucky, on May 4, 1852. Her mother Laura Marshall was a gifted singer and musician, and well-educated even though she grew up as a slave in the household of a relation to her father, the Kentucky statesman Thomas F. Marshall. Laura, nearly white, was emancipated at the age of sixteen. Julia's father, Henry Harrison Britton, was a carpenter and free born. So, Julia was born in a slave state as a free person. She was raised in Lexington where she became well known as a musical prodigy at an early age, playing in parlor concerts for wealthy white families. In 1859 with her younger sister Mary E. Britton (who later became the first African-American, female physician in Kentucky), she attended a branch school in Lexington started by Mr. William H. Gibson of Louisville, Kentucky.

At the age of eighteen, Hooks attended Berea College where she was one of the first African-American women to attend college in the state of Kentucky. Not only did she attend college as a student, but also became the first African-American on the faculty at Berea College. She was active in musical groups such as the Liszt Mullard club which performed classical music in the community during the 1880s. She taught music at the school from 1870 to 1872 (the first African-American to teach white students at Berea College), and graduated in the class of 1874.

== Education and civil rights activism ==
After graduating from college she moved to Greenville, Mississippi, to work as a teacher. There she met and married Sam Wertles. She worked to get Blanche K. Bruce elected to the Senate. After her husband died in a yellow fever epidemic, she moved in 1876 to Memphis, Tennessee. She lived in musicians' paradise, Beale Street, and became known for her local social service work. By 1881 she began teaching again in public schools.

Julia married her second husband, Charles F. Hooks, in Memphis. But an argument between her husband and her 23-year-old sister, Hattie, led to Hattie's suicide in June 1891. The newspapers reported that Charles had accused her of "immorality" and she shot herself "instead of going to church."

Julia's grandson, Benjamin Hooks remembered her from his youth as "born to rebel," and he recalled during the that there were several instances when she was arrested for disobeying Jim Crow laws. While attending a performance at a Memphis theatre, she was told to sit in the "colored balcony" instead of where she had sat in the main section for many other performances. She refused to leave and eventually had to be carried out of the theatre by two policemen. Julia was arrested for disorderly conduct and fined five dollars. Julia battled segregation in public schools, inequality of facilities and the discriminatory treatment of African American children.

Hooks not only acted for African American civil rights but put her hard work and compassion to good use in other areas. She and her husband, a truant officer, were given supervision of a juvenile detention center in Memphis in 1907. She treated these children with compassion and continued to do so even after her husband was killed in 1913 by one of the detainees. She was admired by the community for her hard work and compassion for others, and her work as an officer of the juvenile court then later as a consultant of the juvenile court judge. She organized the fundraising for the Old Folks and Orphans Home, opened a private kindergarten and elementary school in her own home for African-American children, and founded the Hooks School of Music.

In 1909 she became involved in the National Association for the Advancement of Colored People (NAACP). She participated in the suffrage movement, helping women gain the right to vote, and served as president of the Lexington Women's Improvement Club in Kentucky.

Hooks was admired by friends and family and even had family members follow in her footsteps. Ida B. Wells also came to the attention of Julia, as an activist and a musician, even though Hooks was senior to Wells by ten years the two worked together with the same drive and passion for equality.

== See also ==
- Mary E. Britton
- NAACP in Kentucky
