= J.C. McHaskell =

American baseball player (1902–1970)

- First baseman
- Born: July 31, 1902; Pine Bluff, Arkansas
- Died: March, 1970 (aged 67); Detroit, Michigan
- Batted: Unknown Threw: Left

Negro league baseball debut
- 1927, for the Memphis Red Sox

Last appearance
- 1929, for the Memphis Red Sox

Teams
- Memphis Red Sox (1927–1929)

Julius C. McHaskell (July 31, 1902 – March 1970) was an American professional baseball first baseman in the Negro leagues during the 1920s.

A native of Pine Bluff, Arkansas, McHaskell made his Negro leagues debut in 1927 with the Memphis Red Sox. He went on to play three more seasons with Memphis through 1929. McHaskell died in Detroit, Michigan in 1970 at age 67.
