= Joyce Hamilton Berry =

Kentucky woman during the Civil Rights Era

- Born: 1937 (age 88–89); Lexington, Kentucky, U.S.
- Education: University of Kentucky
- Occupation: clinical psychologist

Joyce Hamilton Berry (born 1937), is an American clinical psychologist with her own practice in the Washington D.C. area. She grew up during the time of segregation, attended graduate school during the height of the Civil Rights Movement, and became the first female African-American to earn a Ph.D. from the University of Kentucky in 1970. She was married to David Berry, also from Kentucky.

She has been a regular contributor to many magazines such as Ebony, Essence, and Cover Girl. Berry has also appeared on The Geraldo Rivera Show to give advice and counsel.

== Early life and education ==
Born Joyce Hamilton in 1937 in Lexington, Kentucky, she grew up in what is now called the Martin Luther King Jr. neighborhood. Her grandfather, Charles Hamilton, owned his own land in central Kentucky. Her father was a barber who owned the Sterling Barber Shop on Deweese Street, and her mother was a homemaker. She grew up in a house owned by her father at 260 East 4th Street. She had a great zeal for learning and was an outstanding student at Paul Laurence Dunbar High School (Lexington, Kentucky), graduating early at the age of fifteen. She and her brother were encouraged to work hard in school by their parents, but her motivation for success came from the larger African-American community. The two major Lexington newspapers at the time (the Herald and the Leader) published an insert called the "Colored News and Notes." This section mentioned current news and activities relevant to the local Black community, including the honor roll from the high school. When Joyce failed to make the honor roll one semester, she remembers being questioned by every neighbor in her community about it. Not wanting to face a similar situation in the future, she worked harder in school and never missed the honor again.

== Influences ==
Her mother and father encouraged her to attend Hampton Institute instead of Howard University. The decision to be a teacher was made after lengthy discussions with her parents. John Smith, the first African-American to earn a Ph.D. from the University of Kentucky, was her English teacher at Dunbar High School, also had a profound influence on her educational aspirations. She also had great self-confidence that was instilled by her parents. On one occasion while seeking to join a civil rights protest against segregation of public places in downtown Lexington, Kentucky, her father asked her why she wanted to go to a place and spend her money where she was not welcomed. This made her hesitate about joining in public protests during the 1960s, but did not stop her from taking a strong stand for civil rights of African-Americans.

== Education ==
She attended Hampton Institute, now Hampton University, and graduated as an English major. In Virginia, she first encountered segregation on a larger scale. Unlike her hometown of Lexington, Kentucky, the buses were segregated, with Blacks having to pay at the front, then walk to the back to enter. She never rode the bus again in Virginia after that initial incident. After graduating from Hampton, she returned home and taught school in Lancaster, Kentucky, and at her alma mater Dunbar High School before attending graduate school at the University of Kentucky in 1962. She received her master's degree in 1964, then went on in 1970 to be the first female African-American to earn a Ph.D. in Psychology from the University of Kentucky. She served briefly on the faculty at Kentucky State University before moving to Columbia, Maryland.

== Contributions to her community ==
Berry served her community in a number of ways during the Civil Rights Movement. She was a member of the Congress of Racial Equality and the Urban League. Her experiences as a graduate student at the University of Kentucky and later as a social services worker led her often to speak out against discrimination on the basis of her race and her gender. She was a member of the Lexington-Fayette County Merger Commission in the early 1970s that formed the Lexington Fayette Urban County Government.

In the late 1970s, Berry moved to Columbia, Maryland, to work for the federal government. She later established a private psychology practice in Washington, D.C., where she has continued to work, specializing in marriage, family, and relationship counseling.
