= Suzy Post =

American civil rights activist

- Born: Suzanne Kling; March 19, 1933; Louisville, Kentucky
- Died: January 2, 2019 (aged 85); Louisville, Kentucky
- Education: University of California Berkeley; Indiana University
- Spouse: Edward Post
- Children: 5

Suzanne Post (March 19, 1933 – January 2, 2019) was a civil rights activist in the struggle against discrimination and social injustice in Kentucky. She was born to Morris and Betty Kling in Louisville, Kentucky on March 19, 1933. She joined a student branch of the National Association for the Advancement of Colored People while a student at Indiana University Bloomington, and continued her student activism at the University of California Berkeley. In her long career, she advocated for social justice and led the way in the battle for civil rights, women's rights and reproductive freedom, LGBTQ rights, and equity in housing and education. Her Uncle Arthur Kling helped found the Kentucky Civil Liberties Union in 1955 and served on the Board of the Louisville Urban League. Michael Aldridge, a former ACLU director, in an article for the Louisville Courier Journal, wrote "the Kling family 's own personal experience with bigotry, and a shared memory of historic oppression and violence, made them fight all prejudice and restrictions on the civil liberties of others".

On May 29, 1953, she married attorney Edward M. Post of Louisville.

She earned a degree in English literature from the University of California, Berkeley in 1955, and returned to Kentucky in her late 20s to live near her extended family in Louisville.

== Civil rights leadership ==
Post was a social justice advocate since the 1950s when the Civil Rights Movement was first organized in Louisville. Sit-ins at segregated businesses were followed by the open housing movement which challenged the cultural norms in real estate transactions that kept homeowners separated by race and religion.

In 1969 Post became President of the Kentucky Civil Liberties Union (later the American Civil Liberties Union of Kentucky). The KCLU provided legal representation for those arrested at many open housing marches, and Post worked with others to raise bail before an open housing law was finally adopted.

=== Equal Rights Amendment ===
While President of the KCLU, Post organized the first statewide women's conference and served as chair of the Kentucky Pro-Equal Rights Amendment Alliance. Representatives came from a cross section of Louisville's social justice community, and Mayor Harvey I. Sloane afterwards provided the Louisville-Jefferson County Human Relations Commission with funds to hire staff to monitor discrimination against women. Post worked for the local Commission for eight years.

=== School integration ===
By 1972 the KCLU and the Kentucky Commission on Human Rights both filed a school desegregation lawsuit against the Louisville-Jefferson County Board of Education which led finally to the development of a controversial busing plan in 1975. As the mother of five children in public schools at that time, Post was seen by the group advised by Robert Sedler (KCLU's volunteer general counsel and tenured law professor at the University of Kentucky) to be the best candidate to serve as the plaintiff. By 1975 the court-ordered desegregation policy for the Jefferson County Public School system was one of the first in the country. Post also monitored the educational institutions' compliance with Title IX prohibiting sex discrimination in education. When she was elected to the National American Civil Liberties Union (ACLU) Board of Directors, she organized a women's caucus to improve the status of women on the national board, and directed the strategy planning in 1972 whereby the National ACLU made women's rights its top priority.

=== Support for Anti-war movement ===
As part of the 1960s and 70s anti-war movement in Louisville, made famous by the nation's best-known dissident Muhammad Ali, Suzy Post mentored and sheltered soldiers going AWOL, draft protesters and other youth who opposed the war in Vietnam.

As the chair of the KCLU she worked to protect the rights of the protesters, but also at times, along with other radicals like Anne and Carl Braden, broke the law personally by hiding soldiers fleeing from nearby Fort Knox. Providing space for meetings and access to printing machines, the Bradens and Post served as a sort of Underground Railroad for Kentuckians seeking to avoid military service in Vietnam.

=== Metropolitan Housing Commission ===
After leaving the Human Relations Commission in 1982, Post became the director of KCLU. She stayed there until 1990 when she accepted a job as founding director of the Metropolitan Housing Coalition (MHC) where she organized a Fair Housing Committee to monitor local compliance with fair housing law. She resigned from MHC in 2006, and remained its director emeritus. She has received numerous awards from many state and local organizations, including the Kentucky Commission on Human Rights Hall of Fame 2007. She remained a member of the NAACP, the ACLU of Kentucky, and the Kentucky Alliance Against Racist and Political Repression.

Suzy Post died on January 2, 2019, at her home in Louisville.

== See also ==
- NAACP in Kentucky
