= Memphis Red Sox =

Negro League baseball team (1923–1950)

Information
- League: Negro Southern League (1921–1924); Negro National League (I) (1924–1925); Negro Southern League (1926); Negro National League (I) (1927–1930); Negro Southern League (1931–1936); Negro American League (1937–1959)
- Location: Memphis, Tennessee
- Ballpark: Fay Park; Russwood Park (1945-47); Field's Park; Lewis Park (1923-32); Martin Stadium (1923-59)
- Established: 1920
- Disbanded: 1959
- League titles: 1938

The Memphis Red Sox were an American Negro league baseball team that was active from 1920 to 1959. Originally named the Barber College Baseball Club, the team was initially owned and operated by Arthur P. Martin, a local Memphis barber. In the late 1920s the Martin brothers, all three Memphis doctors and businessmen, purchased the Red Sox. J. B. Martin, W. S. Martin, and B. B. Martin, would retain control of the club till its dissolution in 1959. The Red Sox played as members, at various times, of the Negro Southern League, Negro National League, and Negro American League. The team was never a titan of the Negro leagues like wealthier teams in northern cities of the United States, but sound management led to a continuous thirty-nine years of operation, a span that was exceeded by very few other teams. Following integration the team had five players that would eventually make the rosters of Major League Baseball teams and two players that were inducted into the Baseball Hall of Fame.

== Founding ==
In 1921 Memphis had two main Negro baseball clubs, the Memphis Union Giants and the A. P. Martin's Barber Boys Baseball Club. The Union Giants were owned by real estate salesman and bookkeeper Sherman G. King. The Union Giants were managed by Chick Cummings who was also a player on the team. The A. P. Martin's Barber Boys, also known as the A. P. Martin's Barber College Team, was the creation of a Memphis barber named Arthur Peterson Martin. The team was a way for Martin to promote his two barber shops which were located in Memphis on Main and Beale Street and his barber college.

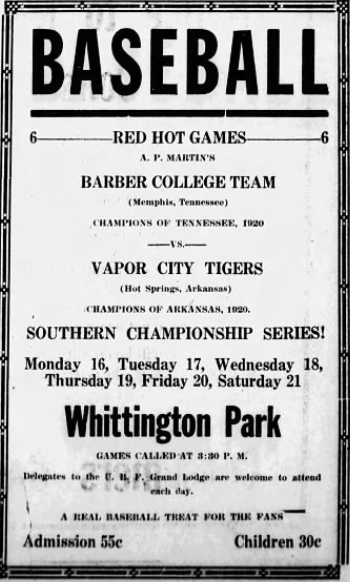
Baseball advertisement for the A.P. Martin and Vapor City Baseball Teams in the Hot Springs New Era Newspaper

The A. P. Martin's Barber College Team had been in existence since at least 1920. They played home games at Russwood Park. The park was home to the white minor league Memphis Chicks. Toward the end of the summer of 1920 a promotion in the Arkansas newspaper the Hot Spring New Era invited readers to come out and watch the “Championship of the South” as the champions of Tennessee, A.P. Martin's Barber College Team face the champions of Arkansas, the Vapor City Tigers. An article in the same paper states that, “the Memphis club has beat everything in Tennessee and Alabama.” The results of the games were not published.

The Memphis Union Giants or Memphis Giants had existed in some form since at least 1907. They played throughout the region. The Giants played members of the National Association of Colored Baseball Clubs in 1908 and 1909. They are mentioned in local newspapers until 1915. From 1915 till 1920 there is very little mention of them or any other black teams from Memphis. The team appears to have disbanded during these years as the announcement for the 1921 team said the city was "... reorganizing the famous Memphis Union Giants known in times gone by as one of the fastest Colored team in the country."

Of these two teams the Union Giants were billed as "the toughest team in the south", but the Barber Boys Ball Club was the preeminent team due to their membership in the Negro Southern League. The Barber College Team played the Chicago American Giants as the northerns toured the south in early April 1921. The Barber Boys lost 2–1 in eleven innings. The Chicago Tribune's short write-up of the game lists Martin's team by name. Southern newspapers, though, often referred to the team as simple “Memphis” or one of several other names. The Montgomery Advertiser referred to the team as the Memphis Stars and the New Orleans Times-Picayune listed the team as the Memphis Black Chicks. It wasn't till late July that the newspaper, the Tennessean, published an article about Elite Giants who were to play a four-game series against the Memphis Red Sox.

At the start of the 1922 baseball season the team representing Memphis in the Negro Southern League was no longer the A. P. Martin's Barber Boys Baseball Club but rather the Memphis Red Sox. Players on the Memphis Red Sox were a combination of players from the Barber Boys and the Union Giants. John W. Miller was the team president and Chick Cummings, the former manager of the Union Giants, was manager of the new club. The team played their first game at Russwood Park on May 3 against Birmingham Black Barons. Memphis won the game against the Barons 4–0. The Red Sox played the rest of their 1922 season home games at Russwood and Field's Park.

With the new team name came new owners, John Miller (also the team president) and Moses Dandridge. Miller and Dandridge were co-owners of the Liberty Auto Repair of Memphis. They purchased the Barber College Team from A. P. Martin in 1921. The two would own the team for less than two seasons. By 1923 they had sold the team and Dandridge was no longer listed as a co-owner of the auto repair shop.

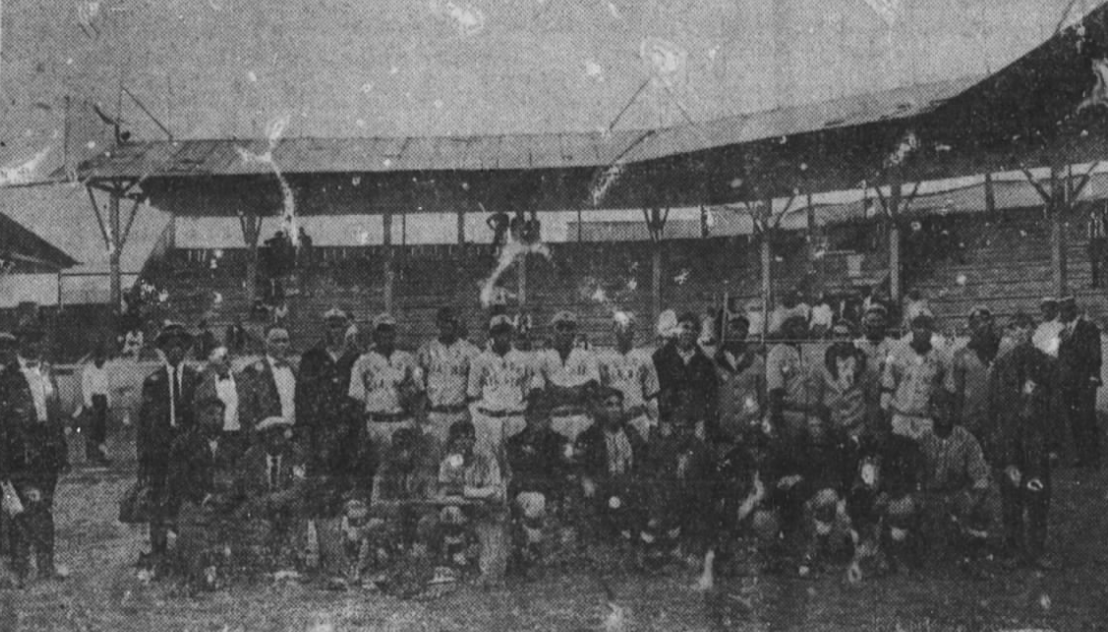
The Memphis Red Sox and the Dallas Black Giants, at the Colored Dixie Series

The Negro Southern League was under severe strain during the 1922 season due to financial problems and bad management. The league was reorganized in 1923 to try to fix these issues. This led to the Red Sox not playing teams in the Negro Southern League after mid-July, and instead play teams from the Negro National League. The team played both the St. Louis Stars and the Chicago American Giants at home. They swept a five-game series with Chicago. Chicago would later go on to win the Negro National League pennant for the third straight year. Both the Commercial Appeal and the Dallas Express newspaper refer to Memphis as the winners of the Southern Negro League pennant, but the Nashville Elite Giants appeared to have had the best record. Despite the discrepancy in September, Memphis played in the first annual Colored Dixie Classic. The series was a playoff between the winner of the Southern Negro League and the winner of the Texas Negro League. In newspaper ads it was promoted as the “Championship of the South” and “A Little World Series.” Memphis won the series against the Dallas Black Giants. The Giants took only three games of the nine-game series. The Dallas Express newspaper, at the conclusion of the Dixie Series, said the following about the victorious Red Sox. “A well balanced base ball machine made up of experience, brain, team work, team play, and inside base ball is the only way to characterize the strength and playing ability of the formidable baseball combination the Memphis Red Sox.”

== 1923–1928 ==
Richard Stevenson Lewis was the owner of the Red Sox at the start of the 1923 season. Lewis was the owner and operation of R. S. Lewis Funeral Home on Vance Avenue in Memphis. It is not clear when Lewis bought the team from Miller and Dandridge. During the Dixie Colored Series of 1922 he is listed in The Dallas Express as the team's president.

On May 15, the Memphis Red Sox dedicated their new stadium at Lewis Park. Built by the team's new owner, the stadium held approximately 3,000 people. It consisted of a grandstand behind home plate, a set of bleachers that ran down the third base line, and a fence that enclosed the remainder of the field.

The Red Sox are one of only a few teams in the Negro leagues that owned their stadium. Among them, the St. Louis Stars owned Star Park, the Pittsburgh Crawford's owned Greenlee Field in Pittsburgh, the Nashville Giants owned Tom Wilson Park in Nashville, and the Claybrook Tigers owned Tiger Stadium in Claybrook, Arkansas. Since the Red Sox now owned their stadium the expense of leasing a ballpark, which could sometime cost up to 20 percent of the gate receipts, was eliminated. Teams that leased stadiums also had to arrange their schedules around the owning team's schedule, which lead to difficulties scheduling league games and coordinating road games. Memphis would retain its Negro league stadium till the team played its last game in 1959.

In 1923 the Toledo Tigers ball club, a member of the Negro National League, was dissolved in mid season. The Cleveland Tate Stars, who were expected to fill the Tiger's spot, could not raise the money for the deposit that the league required. This created an opening for a team in the Negro National League. The two top teams in the Negro Southern League, the Memphis Red Sox and the Birmingham Black Barons, were considered the top contenders to fill the spot. Joe Rush owner of the Black Barons and R. S. Lewis owner of the Red Sox both travelled to Chicago to meet with the president of the Negro National League, Andrew "Rube" Foster, in late July. Neither team was selected to fill the vacancy created by the departure of the Toledo club, but both were granted associate membership to the league. This benefitted both Birmingham and Memphis by preventing National Negro League clubs from enticing players on the Red Sox or Barons roosters to abandon their team and play for the northern teams. It also allowed both southern teams to play the Negro National League teams at a regular interval, which translated to more profit due to higher attendance.

The Negro Southern League with the loss Memphis and Birmingham did not post second half season standings. The league appears to have folded after the first half of 1923. Memphis had 15 wins to 16 losses as the first half of the Negro Southern League wrapped up. They were second to Birmingham, the dominant club in the league, who had 24 wins and 8 losses. Memphis played 19 games as an associate member of the Negro National League against such teams as the Milwaukee Bears, Toledo Tigers, and St. Louis Stars. The team won 13 of those games and lost 6. Memphis finished the season as they had in 1922 by playing the Dallas Black Giants of the Negro Texas League. The Black Giants swept Memphis in three games at Dallas.

The Memphis Red Sox remained an associate member of the Negro National League in 1924. During the league's winter meetings in December 1923 Birmingham, though, had been made a full member. The Negro Southern League, which disbanded in 1923 with the loss of its two best teams, did not reform in 1924. Former teams in the Negro Southern League were left to play independently.

The first preseason game of 1924 at Lewis Stadium was not played due to weather. The game was scheduled for March 30 was cancelled after a storm hit the city. The same storm impacted almost half the country. Severe thunderstorms, tornadoes, hail, gales force wind, flooding and blizzard conditions lead to the death of at least 23 people across the country. After the cancellation of their first home game The Red Sox faced the Chicago American Giants in three exhibition games in mid April. The Red Sox lost the first two games of the series, but won the third game with a 6–4 score. The win was significant since it broke the Chicago American Giants 19 game win streak.

Memphis first game of the regular Negro National League season was May 3. The team played the Cuban All-Stars. The Cuban All-Stars were the only team in the Negro National League that did not have a home ballpark and were a road team for the entire season. Memphis and the Cuban Stars split the two-game series. Memphis's schedule though May and into June included St. Louis, Indianapolis, and Birmingham.

On June 26 the Indianapolis A.B.C's were dropped from the Negro National League. Indianapolis had lost ten players over the winter to the Eastern Colored League. The loss of veteran players devastated the team. In their first seven home games the A.B.C's won only one game. Due to the team's poor performance it was designated as an associate team and Memphis took Indianapolis's place in the league.

The Red Sox also assumed Indianapolis A.B.C.'s dismal record of 3–19, but by July the league had decided to changes the team's initial record to 12–12. The Red Sox were ranked fourth in the league with the adjustment. From August 2 to the end of the season Memphis would win only 5 games while losing 14. Memphis finished the season with an average of .439 in 5th place in the league.

In early January 1926 Negro National League Winter meeting was held in Philadelphia. At the meeting the league announced that Memphis would be dropped as a member. The Associated Negro Press also reported that the Red Sox and the Birmingham Black Barons had withdrawn from the league. In April, the owners of eight southern clubs, including the Red Sox and the Black Barons, met in Memphis and created a new Negro Southern League with the first game featuring the Red Sox versus the New Orleans Ads to be played May 1 in Memphis.

Birmingham won the 1st half championship and by early September the Red Sox with 20 wins and 7 losses were declared the second half champs. The two teams met for the first game of a best of nine Negro Southern League Championship playoff series on September 11 at Lewis Park. The first game was called due to darkness after 12 innings ending in a 2–2 tie. In game two Birmingham batters bunched hits in the fourth and sixth innings scoring four runs in each inning . The Barons won the game 9–4. Game three ended 1–0 in a Birmingham victory after catcher William Poindexter scored the winning run in the 7th inning.

With Black Barons leading with two wins, the series moved to Rickwood Field in Birmingham. Game four was another 1–0 win for the Black Barons. The game was scoreless till the bottom of the 9th inning. Game five was called in the 9th inning due to darkness with the score tied. Birmingham won game six 2–0. It was also Birmingham pitcher Jim Jefferies second shutout of the series.

The series returned to Memphis on September 25. Game seven was the third tie of the series. Called due to darkness in the 11th inning, the game was a shutout for both Drake throwing for Memphis and Birdine who pitched for Birmingham. Memphis was able to take the next two games by shutting out the Black Barons 2–0 and 1–0. Finally on September 29 at Lewis Park, Birmingham closed the series out by winning its fifth game 9–3. The Birmingham Black Barons were declared the champions of the Negro Southern League.

The failure of the largest African American owned bank in Memphis over the winter of 1927 and the drop in attendance over the preceding years lead Red Sox owner R. S. Lewis to incorporate the ball club prior to the 1928 season. The partnership included A. M. McCullough, M. B. Burnett, C. B. King, W. H. Cole and Dr. E. E. Nesbitt. The background of the men varied greatly. McCullough owned a variety of Memphis business. Burnett worked in insurance, banking, and investment. King was the director at a life insurance company. Cole was a timber contractor. Nesbitt was a physician working out of the same building from which Lewis ran his funeral home. Incorporating the team raised fifty thousand dollars for Red Sox operation and stadium maintenance while protect it against the financial woos of one single investor.

== 1929–1930 ==
Dr. J.B. Martin and Dr. W. S. Martin purchased the Red Sox in 1929. They were two of four college-educated brothers that lived in Memphis. Dr. J. B. Martin would go on to be owner of the Chicago American Giants and president of the Negro American League. The brothers had lent money to R. S. Lewis and he used the Red Sox and Lewis Stadium as collateral for the loan. In the spring of 1929 when Lewis could not repay the brothers they took possession of the ball club. News reports from the year also list Dr. E. E. Nesbitt as president of the Red Sox.

The Red Sox opened the 1929 season against the Birmingham Black Barons. Memphis won the game 2–0. Memphis pitcher Carl Glass held the Black Barons to only one hit. Despite the season opener, Memphis would finish the first half of the season near the bottom of the league with the lowest batting average and most errors of any team. The club's dysfunction was so bad that at one point, a fight between the pitcher, Robert Poindexter, and first baseman, J.C. McHaskell, lead to Poindexter shooting McHaskell in the foot. The Red Sox would finish the season in last place.

On April 25, 1930, Memphis opened the season with a four-game series against the Cuban Stars. The Star and the Red Sox split the series kicking-off a losing year for Memphis. By September, the team had won just 29 games while losing 45. They finished fifth in the league.

The Great Depression brought two changes to the game in 1930. On June 20 the start time for the first game against the Birmingham Black Barons was pushed back from the normal 3:00 to 3:30 time to 5:00. The later start time for these “twilight games” meant more people would be off work and able to come. The other change was the product of J. L. Wilkinson, owner of the Kansas City Monarchs. The Monarchs were touring the country with a portable lighting system. The lights allowed games to be played at night for the first time. On May 12 approximately 4,000 people packed Lewis Park to see the Memphis Red Sox play their first night game. They lost the game 8–4.

== 1931–1939 ==
Memphis, the Nashville Elite Giants and the Birmingham Black Barons withdrew from the Negro National League in 1931. The teams, along with Chattanooga, Montgomery and New Orleans, formed a new Negro Southern League. The league was based solely in the southeast which limited the high cost of transportation. The first half championship was claimed by both the Elite Giants and the Red Sox. Memphis though would play the Grey Sox, the second half champions, in the league championship series. With the series tied three games each, game seven scheduled for September 21 was canceled. No reason was given for the cancellation and the 1931 season ended with no clear Southern League Champion.

Two Negro leagues started the 1932 season: the Negro Southern League, of which Memphis was a member, and the East-West League. Only the Negro Southern League would finish out the year.

Memphis started the 1932 season in last place and by mid-June was accused of fielding players who were owned by other teams. League President Jackson threatened to throw Memphis out of the league. The dispute appeared to have been between Memphis and Birmingham over a first baseman named West. West left the Black Barons, whose team collapsed halfway through the season and was placed on the Memphis roster. West, though, was never properly released from Birmingham, but by mid season the matter had been settled. Memphis added several new players throughout the summer, but finished in third place, behind Nashville and Chicago.

The Red Sox were once again member of the Negro Southern League in 1933. The team finished in first place for the first half of the season, with a record of 32 wins and 10 losses. However, after the first half of the season there is no clear record of the rest of the season. Memphis spent most of August barnstorming though Iowa and Nebraska. In the towns they played, the local newspapers claimed that they were the southern league champions. The New Orleans Crescent Stars also claimed the championship.

The next year Memphis once again started in the Negro Southern League, but by July the team was barnstorming in cities throughout the Midwest. The team participated and won the Class A Council Bluffs, Iowa, semi-pro tournament. In early October five Red Sox players were chosen to represent the South in the North–South All-Star game between the Negro National League and the Negro Southern League.

In 1935 Memphis spent a large part of the year barnstorming. The team competed in the National Baseball Congress's First Annual Semi-Pro Tournament in Wichita, Kansas, placing seventh and in September they played the Claybrook Tigers for the Negro Southern League Championship. Claybrook won the series four games to three games. Game seven was played at Martin Stadium where the Red Sox lost 5–2.

In 1937, the Red Sox became a charter member of the Negro American League. The following year they were first half champions with a 21–4 record. As was the case in a handful of Negro league baseball seasons, the first and second half winners would be matched up in a postseason series. Memphis played the second half champion Atlanta Black Crackers for the Negro American League pennant. In that series, the first two games were to be in Memphis, followed by one game in Birmingham, and then to finish with three games in Atlanta. The Red Sox won both games played in Memphis, but those would be the only games played. The Black Crackers did not arrive at the Birmingham ballpark until 8:30 that night, which was deemed too late to start by the league president. The series then moved to Atlanta, but the minor league Atlanta Crackers had home games scheduled for the same days as the series games. The Black Crackers attempted to reschedule the games, but Memphis owner Dr. B. B. Martin refused to reschedule citing the high cost that would be incurred if the team's stay were extended in Atlanta. At the league's winter meetings it was decided that the Red Sox had won the Negro American League pennant due to Memphis's two wins and the forfeiture of the Black Crackers in game three of the series.

== 1940–1949 ==
In 1940 the team finished second in the Negro American League, but events that occurred after the season lead to a change in teams front office. Memphis police, starting in late October, began to harass one of the Red Sox co-owners and the president of the Negro American League, J. B. Martin. The police commissioner claimed that Martin was selling narcotics in his Memphis drug stores and placed police outside the stores to search all people entering. This was in retaliation for Martin's support of Republican politicians, a stance that was in opposition of the powerful former mayor of Memphis, Edward H. Crump. Due to the continuing police presence at his stores and threats of prosecutions J. B. Martin left Memphis in early December. He settled in Chicago leaving control of the Red Sox to his brothers and co-owners B. B. Martin and W. S. Martin.

In the first half of the 1940s World War II, and the United States entry into the conflict, impacted the team in many different ways. The Red Sox had several players that joined or were drafted into the armed forces. Robert Sharpe, Olan Taylor, Leonard Randolph, Joe Scott, Bob Boyd, Riley Stewart were all Memphis players that served in the Army. Marlin Carter served in the Coast Guard. Walter Johnson served in the Navy. Neal Robinson, outfielder for the Red Sox, and players from several other teams was stuck for a short time in Puerto Rico as they finished playing winter baseball in early 1942. The players, who used ships to get to the main land from the island, were stopped due to fears of German U-boats attacking their transports. Tires and gas were rationed which lead several clubs to play closer to home and in the first half of 1943 the Office of Defense Transportation ruled that in order to save fuel league teams could not use their buses. The government agreed to let the teams travel by bus during the second half of the season after fans and owners appealed to have the ban lifted.

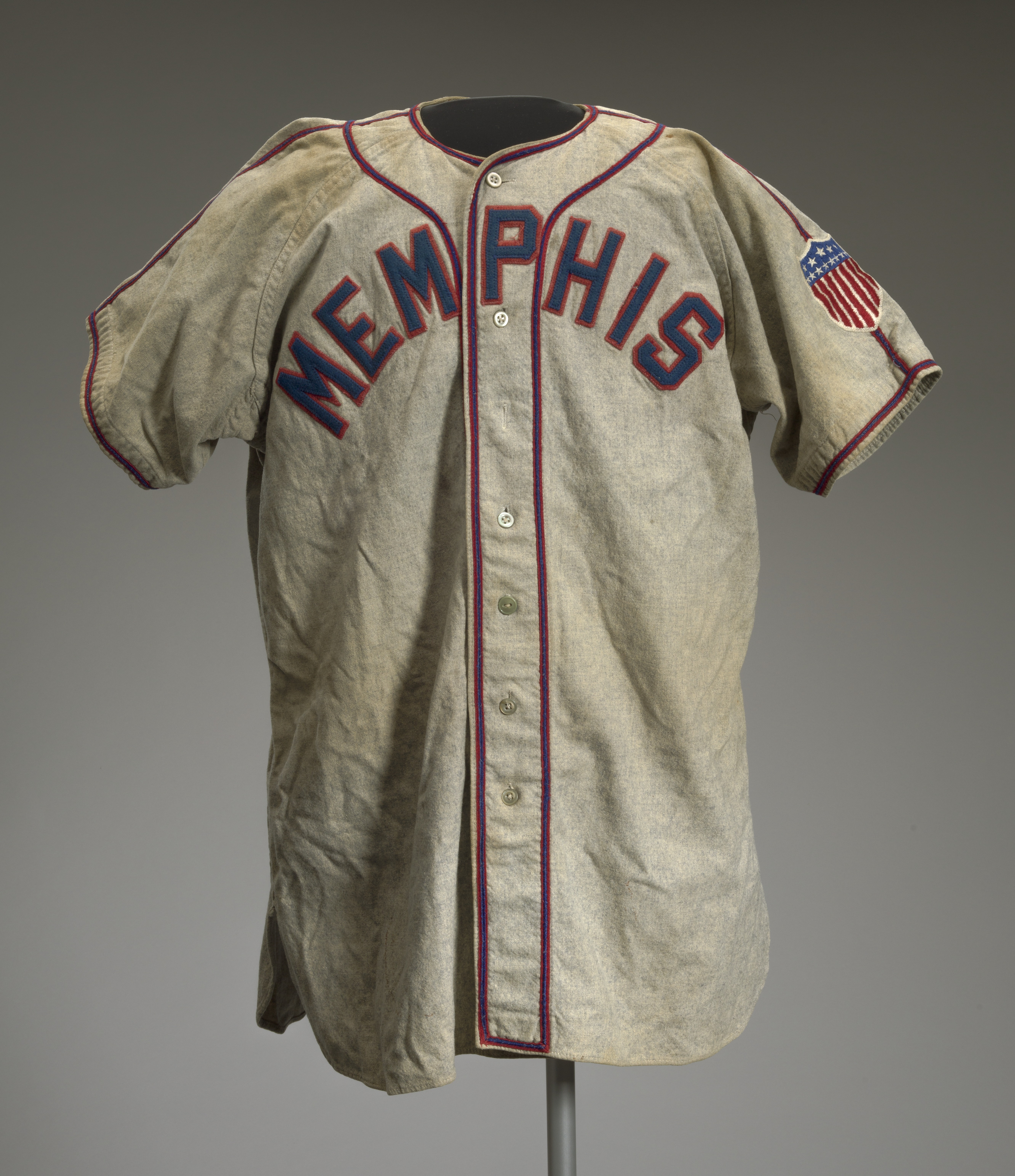
Neil Robinson's Memphis Red Sox Jersey

The early 1940s saw several other challenges for Memphis. At the start of the 1943 season several players under contract by the Red Sox were enticed to join the Negro National League's Philadelphia Stars. The player dispute between the leagues was not resolved until the beginning of July when the Stars released pitcher Verdell Mathis and four other Red Sox players back to Memphis. A year later the Red Sox lost all-star pitcher Porter Moss when he was shot and killed as the team travelled back to Memphis by train following a game at Nashville. As the World War II ended in 1945 the team saw one of its worst regular season records ever. The Red Sox managed only 17 wins in 78 games. Surprisingly though, the early 1940s would be the most profitable period the team would ever see.

The winning pitcher for the Chicago East-West Games in 1946 and 1947 was a right handed Memphis starter, Dan Bankhead. Bankhead's pitching in 1947 attracted the attention of the Brooklyn Dodgers. Branch Rickey, the Dodgers’ General Manager, and George Sisler, a Dodgers’ scout and former player, flew to Memphis in late August to look at the Red Sox pitcher. Bankhead threw for the Memphis Red Sox at Martin Stadium with Ricky and Sisler watching. Memphis played the Black Barons. Bankhead struck out eleven batters and the Red Sox won the game 7 to 2. In 1947, Bankhead struck out a total of 113 batters in 109 innings and had an ERA of 2.16 in Negro league games. After watching Bankhead, Rickey purchased his contract from B. B. Martin for a reported $15,000. Bankhead made his major league debut on August 26, 1947. Later in year after both the Major League and American Negro League seasons had concluded, Bankhead returned to Memphis and played in several exhibition games. In Memphis, 6000 fans turned out to see Bankhead pitch as the Red Sox celebrated Dan Bankhead Day. Bankhead talked to reporters about his time with Memphis, “Sometimes they'd play three (games) in one day, and I'd be in all of them.” He also told reporters that even if his career in Major League Baseball did not work out that he did not intend to return to Memphis. “Once last year they pitched me six straight days. I either started or relieved. I was so tired my tongue was hanging out. We rode all night in those dinky buses and then they made you pitch your head off in towns like Grand Rapids, Michigan, and Peoria, Illinois, and other places.”

The Red Sox performance slowly declined throughout the decade. They only finished above 500 two times in the ten-year span. The first time was in 1940 when the team finished in second place. A playoff series was not required that year though because the Kansas City Monarchs won first place in both the first and second half of the season and claimed the Negro American League Championship. Memphis also finished in second place in the league standings in 1943, but was not in first place in either the first or second half of the season. The Kansas City Monarchs and Chicago American Giants played against each other for the championship. By 1949 the team would only finish in ninth place ahead of only the Louisville Buckeyes.

== 1950–1960 ==
On August 4, 1950, the Chicago White Sox bought the contract of Bob Boyd from the Red Sox for $12,000. Boyd was a walk on for Memphis in 1947 and played first base for the team. He appeared in two East–West Games and never had a batting average below .350 during his time with the team. The transaction was brokered between the White Sox General Manager, Frank Lane, and the Red Sox General Manager and part owner, B. B. Martin. The sale though occurred without the authorization of W. S. Martin, the controlling owner and president of the club. W. S. Martin immediately sued the White Sox who he claimed had enticed Boyd to leave the Red Sox. W.S. Martin also claimed that he received no money from the transaction. Memphis filed for $35,000 in damages in U.S. District Court. In late December it was reported that B. B. Martin had stepped down as general manager of the Red Sox and would have no more involvement with the team. In February 1951 J. B. Martin announced that he had spoken to both his brothers and that they had reached a settlement in the Boyd dispute. W. S. Martin dropped his lawsuit against the Chicago White Sox. Details of the settlement were not disclosed. Boyd was promoted from the White Sox minor league Colorado club to the Chicago White Sox the following week.

On May 17, 1958, the Red Sox president and primary owner, William S. Martin, died following a yearlong illness. Martin was 77 years old. At the time of his death he was vice-president of the Negro American League. He also was president and superintendent of the Collins Chapel Hospital where he had been a physician since 1920. While superintendent of the hospital he funded the institution personally during financially difficult periods and even supplied the hospital with food from his farm during the Depression. He obituary stated that, “his only recreation was attending Red Sox games.” After W. S. Martins death his widow, Eva Cartman Martin, and his brother, B. B. Martin took over operation of the Red Sox. The team completed the 1958 season, but the Martins still owed money on the Martin Stadium mortgage. At the end of 1958 the new team owners entertained offers on the stadium, but could not reach a deal with any interested buyer.

On May 28, 1960, Dr. B.B. Martin announced he was dissolving the Red Sox for financial reason. “It has been a losing proposition for the past four or five years...,” Dr. Martin said. The Negro American League would continue on for just a couple more years before it dissolved completely.

== Notable players ==
=== Red Sox Hall of Fame Players ===
- Norman "Turkey" Stearnes played center field, left field and first base. He was only with Memphis for the 1922 season. In his 13-year career he had a BA of .346 and an OBP of .407. Stearnes played in four All-Star games, and was inducted into the Baseball Hall of Fame in 2000.
- William "Willie" Hendrick Foster was a pitcher. He played with Memphis in 1923, 1924, and 1938. Foster was the half brother of Andrew "Rube" Foster, owner of the Chicago American Giants and one of the founders of the Negro National League. In his eleven-year career he had an ERA of 2.77. On July 2, 1923, while with Memphis, Foster pitched a no hitter against the independent Hot Spring black baseball club. Foster was inducted into the Baseball Hall of Fame in 1996.
- Willie “El Diablo” Wells was one of the best short stops in the Negro Leagues. Over a twenty-five-year career he appeared in eight East-West games and ended his major Negro League career with a .326 batting average. Wells played in 1948 with the Red Sox at third base. During that year, he took the field with his son Willie Wells Jr, who played short stop. A father and son duo on the same major league team would not occur again until 1987 when Ken Griffey and Ken Griffey Jr took the field for the Seattle Mariners. Wells was inducted into the Baseball Hall of Fame in 1997.
- John “Buck” O'Neil was a player and coach in the major Negro Leagues and was the first black coach on an MLB team in 1967 for the Chicago Cubs. He played his rookie year with the Memphis Red Sox in 1937. O’Neil played for the Kansas City Monarchs in both the 1942 and 1946 Negro League World Series. Later in life, O’Neil helped found the Negro League Baseball Museum in Kansas City, Missouri and served as its chairman. Buck O’Neil was awarded the Presidential Medal of Freedom in 2008, inducted into the Chicago Cubs Hall of Fame in 2022, and inducted into the Baseball Hall of Fame in 2022.

=== Red Sox Players that also played in Major League Baseball ===
- Daniel Robert Bankhead was a right-handed pitcher who played for the Birmingham Black Barons from 1940 to 1945 and the Memphis Red Sox in 1946 and 1947. In the middle of the 1947 season Brooklyn Dodgers president, Branch Rickey, bought Bankhead's contract from the Red Sox for $15,000. Bankhead made his major league debut on August 26, 1947, in a game at Ebbets Field against the Pittsburgh Pirates. With that appearance he became the first black player to pitch in modern major league baseball. In his relief appearance he allowed 15 hits and 8 runs in 3.1 innings. Bankhead did not pitch for the Dodgers in the 1947 World Series, but he did score a run as a pitch runner. After 1947, the Dodgers sent Dan down to the minor leagues. He returned to play for the Brooklyn Dodgers in 1950 and part of 1951. He left major league baseball with a career ERA of 6.52 in 153.1 innings pitched.
- Jehosie“Jay” Heard was a left-handed pitcher who played primarily for the Birmingham Black Barons and the Houston (New Orleans) Eagles. In the spring of 1949 the Memphis Red Sox bought his contract, but it is unclear if he played for the team. In 1952 the St. Louis Browns acquired Heard and placed him in their minor league system. The Browns were sold to Baltimore attorney Clearance Miles in 1953. In 1954 the team was moved to Baltimore and the team's name was changed to the Orioles. Heard was called up from the minors to play on the new Orioles team. He only pitched two games, 3.1 innings. In that time he gave up 6 hits and 5 runs.
- Marshall “Sheriff” Bridges was a left-handed pitcher who played for Memphis prior to his major league debut. In eight years with the major leagues he played for the St Louis Cardinals, Cincinnati Reds, New York Yankees, and Washington Senators. In 345.1 innings pitched his career ERA was 3.75. He pitched in relief during game 4 of the 1962 World Series for the Yankees.
- Bob “Rope” Boyd was a left-handed first baseman that played for the Memphis Red Sox in 1947 and 1948. In 1950 he was the first African American to sign with the Chicago White Sox. Over ten years Boyd played for the White Sox, Baltimore Orioles, Kansas City Athletics, and Milwaukee Braves. His career batting average with 1935 at bats was .293. Later in life Boyd continued to play baseball with the semi-pro Wichita Dreamliners. He was awarded the National Baseball Congress World Series MVP in 1965 when the Dreamliners won the NBC championship.
- Vibert Ernesto “Webbo” Clarke was a left-handed pitcher who played for the Cleveland Buckeyes from 1946 to 1949, the Memphis Red Sox from 1950 to 1953, and the Pampa Oilers of the West Texas - New Mexico League in 1954. Clarke debuted with the Washington Senators on September 4, 1955. He pitched in seven games and started two. In 21.1 innings pitched he had an ERA of 4.64. Clarke was sent to the minor league Charlotte Hornets at the beginning of the 1956 season and never returned to the major leagues.

=== Other Star Red Sox Players ===
- Verdell Mathis, left hand pitcher who also played first base and the outfield. Mathis pitched in two North-South Negro League All Star games and he was the winning pitcher in two East-West All-Star games. In nine years with Memphis his ERA was 3.20.
- Marlin "Pee Wee" Carter played shortstop, second base, and third base. He had a BA of .257 and an OBP of .317 in his time with Memphis. He also played in the 1942 East-West All-Star game.
- Cornelius "Neal" Randall Robinson played shortstop, second base, center field and left field. Over the eleven years he played Memphis, he played in eight East-West All-Star games. In the 1938 All-Star game he hit a 3 run inside the park home run that lead the West to a 5–4 victory over the East. He had a career BA of .310 and an OBP of .377 over 14 years.
- Country singer Charley Pride also played for the team in 1953 and 1958 as a pitcher and outfielder.

== Notable games ==
=== No hitters ===
Date	Pitcher	Opponent	Score
07-02-23	Willie Foster	Arkansas Travelers	7–0
07-27-31	Homer Curry	Little Rock	12–0
09-05-31	Homer Curry	Birmingham	6–0
07-09-33	Son Harvey	Nashville	1–0
09-27-43	Porter Moss	Cincinnati Clowns	5–0
08-05-50	Isiah Harris	Kansas City Monarchs	1-0
