= Viola Rowe Gross =

American businesswoman

- Born: August 25, 1921; Danville, Kentucky
- Died: February 20, 2012 (aged 90); Versailles, Kentucky
- Occupations: teacher, clubwoman and businesswoman, author
- Spouse(s): Dr. Rodney T. Gross, Jr.
- Children: Rodney T. Gross III and Dr. Gregory Allen Gross
- Parent(s): Robert Rowe, Sr. and Hortense Moore Rowe

Viola Denisa Rowe Gross (August 25, 1921 – February 20, 2012) from Danville, Kentucky, was a teacher, businesswoman, clubwoman and author. She served on many local, state and national organizations and associations in support of African American civil rights and human rights in general. She and her husband Dr. Rodney Gross Jr. were partners at Gross Veterinary Clinic, which opened in Grayson, Kentucky in 1962. They were the first African-Americans to hold professional degrees in Carter County, Kentucky.

== Family, community and early life ==
Viola Rowe Gross was born to Robert Rowe Sr. and Hortense Moore Rowe in Danville, Kentucky. She attended the segregated Bate High School and then the historically black liberal arts college, Knoxville College. She later transferred to Kentucky State University where she graduated with degrees in both English and social studies. She married Rodney T. Gross Jr. and they had two children, Rodney T. Gross III and Dr. Gregory Allen Gross. Gross was involved many organizations including the NAACP, the State Veterinary Medical Association and the United Methodist Women of the United Methodist Church. She was an active member of a local church in each town where she lived, including the St. John African Methodist Episcopal Church in Frankfort.

== Career ==
After graduating from Kentucky State University, Gross moved to Missouri where she taught for a year, then moved to Columbus, Ohio to live with her aunt. While in Ohio she met and married Rodney T. Gross Jr. After he graduated from Ohio State University the two moved to Tuskegee, Alabama where Dr. Gross would graduate from the Tuskegee Institute with a doctorate in veterinary medicine in 1954. While living in Tuskegee, Viola worked at the Veterans Administration Hospital as an assistant agent cashier. The Veteran's Hospital was the fifth largest in the nation and operated by only Blacks. Living in Tuskegee raised her awareness about the violent effects of segregation, and she learned of the uprisings in the Deep South to promote equal rights such as boycotts of buses, department stores, and groceries, which resulted in financial problems for whites. In 1957 the Grosses moved to Grayson, Kentucky where their children were born. They opened Gross Veterinary Clinic in 1962. They were the first African-Americans in Carter County to hold professional degrees. At the time, African-Americans were not allowed to teach in white schools where the pay was more lucrative, so Viola ended her teaching career to become a partner in her husband's practice. However, she remained active in school issues, serving as vice-president of the Prichard Elementary PTA in the 1970s. She was also active in the Bagby Memorial Methodist Church in Grayson. She worked as an office manager in the Gross Veterinary Clinic until 1992 when her husband died. In June 1995 the clinic was sold to Dr. Donald Gibson who moved to Grayson from Maysville.

== African American family genealogy ==
After her husband's death, Gross moved to Frankfort and in 2003 Kinnersley Press published her genealogical work in a book entitled, Two Hundred Years of Freedom: A Genealogy and History of the Doram, Rowe, Barbee and Allied Families. The book includes a detailed history and lineage of the Doram, Rowe and Barbee families. The book includes information such as careers, marriages, owned property, and ledgers dating back over 200 years. An index of names and primary sources such as photos, marriage certificates, and emancipation documents are included in the book. There is also information regarding the restoration of the portraits of Dennis and Didamia Dorham. [3] The portraits are very rare and are possibly the only pair of 19th century portraits of an African-American couple in the U.S. still left intact. [5] Since the height of the Jim Crow era, white women traced their lineage to prove their standing in prestigious organizations such as the Daughters of the American Revolution. Black women's organizations also emphasized genealogical research as a way to establish a respectable standing in society. The Moynihan Report of 1965 blamed single-parent families in black communities for their own poverty and violence-laden lives, voicing a common belief at the time of a race-based pathology inherent to black families. The powerful impact of Alex Haley's book and subsequent television series, Roots, in the 1970s and the reentry of the story of Thomas Jefferson's private life with the Hemings family (now clinched with DNA evidence) fueled more work in black families' genealogies than ever before. Today there are many black genealogical or historical societies to support this long neglected work. Viola Rowe Gross stated that the purpose of her book was to provide information about her family's history to future generations. In 2005 she donated sixty-five original documents pertaining to the Doram-Rowe family to the Thomas D. Clark Center for Kentucky History (KHS) in Frankfort, Kentucky. The documents supported the historical significance to two extremely rare portraits of a free African American couple from Kentucky, Dennis and Diademia Doram, painted by Patrick Henry Davenport before the Civil War. One of the documents donated to the KHS were freedom papers dated 1836 that confirmed the emancipation in 1814 of Diademia, her siblings and her mother, Cloe. Dennis Doram was a respected landowner and businessman in Danville, with a rope factory and a hemp business as well as running the Caldwell School for Women.

== Honors and awards ==
She received the Frankfort/Franklin County Branch of the NAACP "Woman of the Year" award the same year. After her death, the Kentucky General Assembly passed resolutions in the House of Representatives (HB 12 RS BR 1988) and in the Senate (12 RS BR 2019) on February 28, 2012, in her honor.

== Death ==
Toward the end of her life, she lived in Frankfort near her son Rodney T. Gross III and enjoyed her three grandchildren, a great-grandson, and a great many others in her extended family. She died at the age of 90 in the Taylor Manor Nursing Home on February 20, 2012, in Versailles.
