= NAACP in Kentucky =

Civil rights organization

The NAACP in Kentucky is very active with branches all over the state, largest being in Louisville and Lexington. The Kentucky State Conference of NAACP continues today to fight against injustices and for the equality of all people.

The National Association for the Advancement of Colored People was founded in 1909 as a civil rights organization for African-Americans during some of the most violent times of segregation in the United States. With locations across the United States, it grew to ensure the rights for all people within the country no matter race or ethnicity: "to fight for social justice for all Americans.". Branches are set up in different states and work together for the common goal of equality. There are also different branches within the states. In Kentucky, there are over 55 branches located throughout the entire state.

== History of the NAACP in Kentucky ==
Kentuckians played a large role in the NAACP. William English Walling from Louisville, Kentucky (1877–1936), an American labor reformer and socialist educated at the University of Chicago, the Hull House and Harvard Law School, brought his interest in women's rights to his work with the American Federation of Labor and founded the National Women's Trade Union League. A few years later, the Springfield Race Riot of 1908 in Illinois informed his work with Mary White Ovington and Henry Moskowitz to form the NAACP.

The Kentucky branch of the NAACP gained national recognition as early as 1940 in Louisville, Kentucky. The NAACP had already supported several court cases to protest the unequal pay of African Americans teachers. Vallateen Virginia Dudley Abbington (1907–2003), one of several school teachers in Louisville who petitioned against the differential in pay, became a plaintiff in an NAACP suit argued by Thurgood Marshall that led to the removal of a 15 percent salary discrepancy between black and white teachers in the Louisville public schools. The case, Abbington v Board of Education of Louisville (KY), filed on December 5, 1940, caused the School board to agree to equal pay, but only if Mrs. Abbington from Jackson Junior High School dropped the lawsuit. The lawsuit was dropped and the salaries of teachers in Louisville no longer differed on the basis of race.

The Kentucky branch of the NAACP also fought against other discrimination through the civil rights movement and beyond. In the case of Eilers v. Eilers, attorney James Crumlin Sr. of the NAACP Legal Defense and Educational Fund, helped Anna sue for custody of her five children from her ex-husband, George Eilers of Jefferson County, Kentucky. In 1964 Eilers had successfully sued his former wife (a white woman from New Haven, Kentucky) after she married Marshall C. Anderson, an African American man, gaining custody of their children since interracial marriage was illegal in Kentucky at the time. Another important leadership role of the NAACP in Kentucky was in the 1970s when the NAACP of Louisville and the Kentucky Civil Liberties Union worked together to fight segregation in the Jefferson County Public Schools.

== Women in the Kentucky NAACP ==
Women had leadership roles in the state and local branches. Osceola A. Dawson served as secretary to the Kentucky NAACP and Audrey Grevious was the president of the Lexington Chapter. Other accomplishments within the NAACP included the first woman prosecutor in Kentucky (1964), Alberta Jones, who also was the first African American woman to pass the Kentucky Bar (1959). With the help of Julia Etta Lewis, Grevious was able to join the Lexington Congress of Racial Equality together to increase their efforts towards equality. Other notable African American women in Kentucky's NAACP throughout history include:

- Olive Burroughs (1951–2003), the first African-American woman elected to the Owensboro, Kentucky City Commission
- Rev. Rhondalyn Randolph, President of NAACP Owensboro Branch 3107 2014–present. First woman pastor of Pleasant Point Missionary Baptist Church. First African-American woman to pastor a Baptist church in western Kentucky.
- Elizabeth (Lizzie) Beatrice Cooke Fouse (1875–1952), served as the national organization's principal correspondent from Lexington, Kentucky
- Rebecca Craft (1887–1945), a schoolteacher from Versailles, Kentucky, who formed the San Diego Women's Civic Organization and was president of the local branch NAACP
- Daisy Jones, escaped from slavery in Kentucky to live in Canada, trained to be a nurse and when she moved to Denver, Colorado in 1904, she became one of the organizers of the NAACP there
- Jennie B. Liggin (1904–1977), founded the first AME Girl Scout troop in Kentucky and with her husband, Reverend Clyde Absalom Liggin, in 1938 led a successful membership campaign of the Louisville Branch of the NAACP
- Frances Harriet Williams (1899–1992), born in Danville, Kentucky was active in the YWCA and the NAACP
- Ann Wagner

Women within the Kentucky branches of the NAACP also received several notable awards in the organization such as the NAACP Magistrate Daniel Massie award for NAACP Involvement Above and Beyond the Call of Duty and the NAACP Herman E. Floyd Award along with other community awards for their participation. Women in the NAACP also helped to organize fundraisers and other events to help fund their causes and struggle.

== Local branches ==
For more information on each of the branches below, see the national NAACP website.

- Ashland - Boyd County Branch
- Bowling Green-Warren County Branch
- Covington Holmes High School Chapter
- Cynthiana & Harrison County Branch
- Danville Youth Council
- Danville-Boyle County Branch
- Falmouth-Pendleton County Branch
- Frankfort (Franklin County) Branch
- Hamilton/Fairfield West Chester Branch
- Hardin County Branch
- Hardin County Youth Council
- Hazard Perry County Branch
- Kentucky State University
- La Grange Reformatory Branch
- Lebanon Branch
- Lexington (Fayette County) Branch
- Louisville Branch
- Louisville Unit
- Madison City Branch
- Madison County (Richmond) Branch
- Maysville Mason County Branch
- Muhlenberg County Branch
- Nelson County Branch
- New Albany Branch
- Northern Kentucky Branch
- Northern Kentucky University Cc
- Owensboro-Daviess County Branch
- Oxford
- Paducah-McCracken Branch
- Paris-Bourbon Branch
- Scott County Branch
- Shelby County Branch
- Springfield Branch
- University Of Kentucky
- University Of Louisville
- Winchester (Clark Co)
- Woodford County (Versailles) Branch

== See also ==
- Audrey Grevious
- Loving v. Virginia
- National Association for the Advancement of Colored People
- NAACP Legal Defense and Educational Fund
- Jefferson County Sunday School Association
