= Martin Stadium (Memphis) =

Former baseball ground

- Interactive map of Martin Stadium
- Former names: Lewis Park
- Address: Memphis, Tennessee
- Coordinates: 35°7′28″N 90°2′48″W
- Owner: W.S. Martin

Construction
- Built: 1923
- Expanded: 1947
- Demolished: 1961
- Cost: $200,000 (1947)

Tenant
- Memphis Red Sox (1923-1959)

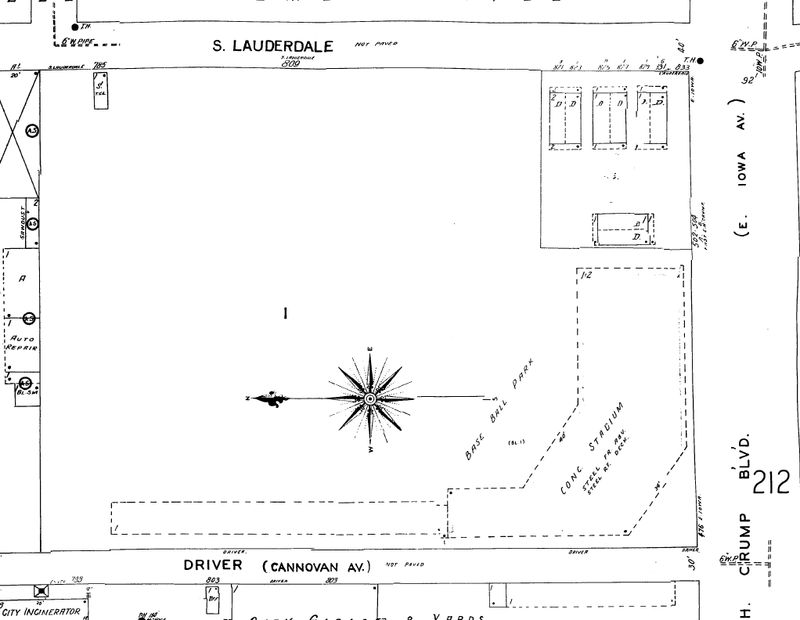
A map of Lewis Park in 1927 used for a fire insurance filing

Martin Stadium, originally known as Lewis Park, was a baseball park in Memphis, Tennessee, which served as the home stadium of the Memphis Red Sox, a Negro league baseball team, in the 1920s through 1959. The park was built in 1923 by the team owner, local businessman Robert S. Lewis. The Red Sox were one of only a few teams in the Negro leagues to have owned their own stadium, allowing them scheduling flexibility not widely enjoyed by their peers and removing the cost of gate fees on leased facilities.

As shown in the 1907 Sanborn map, the ballpark was bounded by Iowa Avenue (now E.H. Crump Boulevard) (south, first base); Driver Street and South Danny Thomas Avenue/Boulevard (orig. South Wellington Street or LaRose) (west, third base); South Lauderdale Street (east, right field); and buildings and East Railroad Avenue (north, left field).

The ballpark was included in the 1927 sale of the baseball team from Lewis to the Martin brothers, including W.S. Martin and J.B. Martin, resulting in the name being changed to reference the new owners. The facility was enlarged, and the stadium was built in 1947 at a cost of US$200,000. After spending decades more acting as the home of the Red Sox and as a space for community events, the Martin brothers sold the stadium in 1960 after disbanding the baseball team, whereupon it was demolished the next year. The site is now home to a semi-truck dealer and has a historical marker.

== See also ==
- List of baseball parks in Memphis, Tennessee
