= Peggy McDowell Curlin =

American women's health advocate

Peggy McDowell Curlin (2 January 1940 – 24 September 2005) was an American women's health advocate from Harlan, Kentucky.

== Early life ==
Curlin was born in 1940 in Harlan, Kentucky and attended Centre College, a liberal arts college in Danville, Kentucky. There, she obtained a bachelor's degree. Also at Centre College, she met her husband, George Curlin who later became a physician with the U.S. Public Health Service.

== Career ==
Curlin spent the majority of her career advocating for the women's health initiative. On a trip to Bangladesh, Curlin noticed the disadvantage women in poorer conditions had. Upset, Curlin wanted to change the condition the women were in. They no access to necessary health vaccinations and care needed. From there, she began fighting for them. Peggy Curlin set up teams of female health advocates to volunteer to give women and children the necessary vaccines that were not being provided. When Curlin returned to the United States, she joined the Centre for Development and Population Activities (CEDPA) in Washington D.C. From that point, she took on the title of President from 1989 to 2003.

== Accomplishments ==
When Curlin joined the CEDPA, she was only a programs officer but quickly moved up her post to vice president, and then president. Peggy Curlin was so passionate and such a great leader that during her presidency, CEDPA became one of the world's most successful non-governmental organizations. Peggy Curlin working for CEDPA can be credited to establishing basic needs for thousands of women in several countries.
