= Frank L. Stanley Sr. =

American publisher and civil rights leader

- Born: 1906; Chicago, Illinois, U.S.
- Died: October 19, 1974; Louisville, Kentucky, U.S.
- Education: Atlanta University
- Occupations: Newspaper publisher; Editor
- Years active: 1933–1971
- Known for: Editor and publisher of The Louisville Defender newspaper
- Spouse: Vivian Clark Stanley

Frank L. Stanley Sr. (1906 – October 19, 1974) was an American newspaper publisher and editor. Stanley co-founded and became sole publisher of The Louisville Defender, the city's leading Black newspaper that he led for 38 years. The Louisville Defender published in the face of regular threats and attacks, persevering under Stanley's belief that "racism is not insoluble." Stanley was general president of Alpha Phi Alpha and a civil rights activist. He drafted the resolution that led to desegregation of higher education in Kentucky, and chaired desegregation committees for the U.S. Secretary of War. Stanley was selected twice as a juror for the Pulitzer Prize Award committee.

== Biography ==
=== Early life and education ===
Stanley was born in 1906, in Chicago, Illinois to Helen Stanley from Louisville, Kentucky and his father from Cicero, Illinois, then moved with his mother back to her hometown. Mrs. Stanley was in the restaurant business and ran the Allen Hotel at 26th and Madison Streets. Stanley graduated from Central High School in 1925 and then attended Atlanta University on a football scholarship. Before graduating in 1929, he was voted All-American in football in addition to being captain of the basketball team, editor of the student paper, and president of the student council. He later received his Master of English degree from the University of Cincinnati.

== Career ==
Stanley began his career as a teacher. Before getting his master's, he taught for two years at Jackson State University (then named Jackson College). After graduate school, he returned to his high school alma mater, where he taught English and advised the student newspaper. In 1933, Stanley joined the staff of a fledgling newspaper first established in 1925 by Robert Sengstacke Abbott, founder of The Chicago Defender, the highest-circulation black-owned newspaper in the country. Abbott had recruited local editorial staff to develop The Louisville Defender that was owned by Abbott and printed in Chicago, but covered Louisville from a Black perspective. By 1936, Stanley was the paper's general manager.

=== Louisville Defender ===
After Robert Abbott died in 1940, the Defender incorporated as its own private business with Stanley as one of three co-owners. According to his son, Kenneth Stanley, there were three other Black papers at the time and the Defender was known for "its militancy," earning scorn from white Louisville. Stanley weathered continuous threats, including an ultimatum from the mayor to leave town in 48 hours. The offices were bombed. Trucks were burned. Windows were shot up. An entire edition was torched. Advertisers walked out.

Nevertheless, during Stanley's time as the Defender's publisher, it earned more than 35 journalism awards. Among them were the President's Special Service Award of the National Newspaper Publishers Association and the Wendell Willkie Award for Public Service from Harry S. Truman. His column, "People, Places and Problems" was nationally syndicated. In 1950, the city's major newspaper, The Courier-Journal, wrote,“Much of the credit for the even and amiable pace Kentucky has maintained in its working out of race relations problems must be given the Defender.”

=== Civil rights leadership ===
After World War II ended, the U.S. Secretary of War James Forrestal named Stanley to a panel of inspectors to review troop conditions in occupied Europe in 1946. Two years later, Stanley returned for a second inspection that informed the order to desegregate the Army. In 1950, Stanley authored the Commonwealth Senate Resolution Bill #53 in the Kentucky General Assembly, leading to the end of institutional segregation in higher education. Stanley was elected national president of Alpha Phi Alpha in 1955 and there had correspondence with fraternity member Martin Luther King Jr. Kentucky Governor Bert Combs commissioned Stanley to explore the establishment of a human rights commission for the commonwealth, which was established by law in 1960.

=== Posthumous honors ===
Stanley was inducted into the University of Kentucky Journalism Hall of Fame in 1983, as well as into the inaugural class of the Kentucky Human Rights Commission Hall of Fame in 2000. The Frank L. Stanley Papers are at the University of Louisville Libraries' Special Collections and Archives.
