= Elizabeth Fouse =

American activist

- Born: May 14, 1875; Lexington, Kentucky
- Died: October 22, 1952 (aged 77)
- Education: University of Cincinnati
- Spouse: William Henry Fouse (m. 1898)

Elizabeth Beatrice Cooke Fouse (May 14, 1875 – October 22, 1952) was a woman from Kentucky, dedicated to gaining equality for African American women on both local and national levels. She founded as well as became the head of many organizations, with the ultimate goal of ending discrimination. Her Christian faith was critical to her activities in social and church-related clubs.

== Background ==
Fouse was born in Lancaster, Kentucky to William and Mary (Kennedy) Cook. She was an only child. Her family raised her within the Baptist church. Fouse grew up in Lexington, Kentucky. She attended both Simmons University and Eckstein-Norton University. She graduated from the University of Cincinnati. She started her teaching career in 1893 in a segregated high school in Corydon, Indiana. She also taught penmanship to white students at Harrison County Institute, and played clarinet in a band though she was the only Black person.

She married William Henry Fouse (1868–1944), a school principal, on August 10, 1898.

== Social activism ==
Fouse was well known for her membership in the National Association of Colored Women (NACW), and became the President of the Kentucky Association of Colored Women (KACW). During her time in the KACW, Fouse started and maintained a scholarship loan fund, which she sustained for over 40 years. Papers from the NAACP showed Fouse as the Principal Correspondent for the Lexington, Kentucky chapter. Her writings included "Women as branch leaders; burglary case results in death penalty; police brutality; rape of minors; and anti-lynching."

In 1920, Fouse founded the Phyllis Wheatley Y.W.C.A. She held the officer position at many organizations, including the Acme Art and Culture Club, the Women's Improvement Club and Day Nursery, the Women's auxiliary of the Emancipation League, and the Baptist Women's Educational Convention. "In opposition to discrimination, segregation, and limited public assistance, Fouse followed a strategy that encouraged self-help, self-sufficiency, and respectable behavior. Although it served the community, club work also allowed black women to cultivate leadership skills and establish a base of organizational strength. Through their civic activism, women like Fouse created and sustained institutions that enabled the Black community not only to survive racism, but demand civic and political rights."

Another important aspect of Fouse's activism was temperance. The first state convention of the Kentucky Woman's Christian Temperance Union (KWCTU), was held in Lexington in 1881. Membership was not open to African American women, though there was some cross-organizational work with Black women's clubs in Kentucky. During the KWCTU Executive Committee Meeting in 1905, local branches were requested to organize auxiliary unions for African-American women to join. In 1907 the newly created Lexington Negro Woman's Christian Temperance Union established a Colored industrial school in the former Good Samaritan Hospital on East Short Street. The school had a day nursery and a vocational training school for children. In addition, Fouse and a Mrs. Ballard led the Lexington Sojourner Truth WCTU. In 1945, all the auxiliary branches separated from the KWCTU and created a separate Kentucky Sojourner Truth Woman's Christian Temperance Union, with Fouse as president.

Fouse was a member of the Zeta Phi Beta sorority.

She was a leader of the Woman's Convention, an auxiliary to the National Baptist Convention, USA, Inc. gathering delegates from local churches, district associations and states to promote charity work and missions abroad and at home. She became a member of Church Women United, a group of denominational women's organizations founded in 1941.

In 1944 Governor Simeon Willis appointed Fouse to serve on the Kentucky Commission for the Study of Negro Affairs.

== See also ==
- NAACP in Kentucky
- National Association of Colored Women
