= Audrey Grevious =

American civil rights activist

- Born: Audrey Louise Ross; September 30, 1930; Lexington, Kentucky
- Died: January 6, 2017 (aged 86)
- Known for: president of the Lexington NAACP.

Audrey Louise Grevious (née Ross; September 30, 1930 – January 6, 2017) became one of the central leaders in the local civil rights movement in Lexington and the Commonwealth of Kentucky.

== Early life ==
Audrey Louise Ross was born in Lexington, Kentucky. As a young child, Grevious lived a one parent home which she shared with her mother, Martha Ross from Monticello, Kentucky, and younger brother, Robert Jefferson.

Her father was from Lexington but did not live with them and she described her upbringing as being raised not only by her mother, but the entire African American community.

When I hear people talk bad about what happens to children who are raised by one parent, you know, I look at them like they're crazy ... I can look at myself and at my brother and say that our mother did an excellent job of raising us, as many of the other mothers did in our neighborhood during that time.

Grevious spent most of her youth helping her mother and trying to stay out of trouble. Her mother was a domestic servant: "I guess you would call her a nanny, but she was not called a nanny then. But she did the things that the nannies are doing now and being paid very well for. She raised up children." Grevious attended Constitution Elementary School and then Dunbar Junior and High School, both segregated schools, almost always bringing home good grades. She credited her mother with giving her the drive and self-confidence to succeed: "She instilled in us that we needed to be the very best that we could. That we needed to have a goal and that that goal would mean that we had to depend on other people to help us get there; which meant we couldn't waste our time and energy doing stupid things, getting into trouble."

Grevious participated in Girl Scouts and was involved in many social functions at the Charles Young Community Center, including dances, arts and crafts activities and talent shows. From an early age, she was inspired to become a teacher, citing her math teachers at Dunbar, Mrs. Claire Winda Taylor and Mrs. Ada Taylor ("the unofficial principal of Dunbar High school") as her role model for a future career in teaching. Grevious graduated in 1948 and remained active in fundraising efforts of the Dunbar Alumni Association which offers scholarships to promising students.

== College years ==
After graduating from Dunbar, she enrolled in Kentucky State University in Frankfort, Kentucky, in the fall of 1948. She would travel home every weekend, and seeing how tired her mother was from trying to support her, she quit school the following year to get a job. She worked as a secretary in the printing shop for the Town Crier, a Black newspaper in Lexington. It was during this time that Grevious began to realize the depth of racism and everyday discrimination in Kentucky: "It made me aware of how limited black America was within Lexington's society."

In 1955, after her brother returned from military service he had enough money to send himself, his wife and his sister to Kentucky State. Grevious graduated in 1957 with a degree in elementary education. During her college years she had become a member of the National Association for the Advancement of Colored People (NAACP) branch chapter in Lexington, elected as secretary, and she was forced to give up her job at the Town Crier as well as another job she had at a department store.

When she graduated from college, she became president of the Lexington NAACP. She attended the NAACP national convention in New York, and with some members from Ohio, agreed to participate in an experiment that would test White America's racism. She agreed that she would travel with some male NAACP members by car from New York to Lexington through Virginia and Maryland—and back again to New York. On the way to Kentucky, they drove "a fairly good little old car, not fancy or anything, just a good, old running car" and were dressed in their regular business professional clothes. Grevious described the reactions from White business owners when they stopped: "We weren't served any place. Now a couple of places said they would fix us some food in a box, in a sack if we came around to the back door to get it. Of course, naturally you were not going to do this. Then the plan was to get back to Lexington, the NAACP rented a limousine for us, furs for me, jewelry -- not African dress like they do now so much, but different. And I was to sit in the back, one young man was to be dressed up in a suit all the time and the other was to be the chauffeur. And we were to head back and stop at the very same places all the way back to New York. And we were served at every place that we stopped except one. And the conclusion that we came to was that they weren't quite sure who I was. Same people, we were still clean when we went before only this time I had some furs in the hot summertime wrapped around me and jewelry... so they were quite sure whether this was a foreigner coming through and they served us. ... this is what really got me into the serious part of making a change ... got me into the Movement one hundred and ten percent."

== Educator and civil rights activist ==
Grevious started teaching at a school for delinquent youths, Kentucky Village Reform School—later called Greendale Reformatory (now the Blackburn Correctional Complex). While teaching grade school there she noticed how segregated the institution was and challenged the "separate but equal" policy by going with her students to eat lunch in the Whites-only cafeteria. Although she met with the superintendent many times, she was never fired, and eventually earned the position of head principal.

While working at Kentucky Village, Grevious remained an active member of the NAACP and led many "picket line" protests against Lexington businesses that refused to hire or serve Blacks. In doing this she spurred a movement that led African Americans to positions they never held before. She was able to do all of this free of any crowd violence. Grevious worked closely with Julia Lewis, president of the local Congress on Racial Equality (CORE) chapter, and eventually became the vice-president of CORE also, bringing the two organizations together in order to establish social and economic justice.

After leading many protests that displayed the inequality of African Americans in Lexington, Mrs. Grevious was able to accomplish what had not been possible in most areas across the south. She retired from teaching after she became principal at Maxwell Elementary School, and she remained an active NAACP member. Audrey Grevious recalled her legacy in several oral history interviews conducted by the Louie B. Nunn Center for Oral History at the University of Kentucky Libraries. She died on January 6, 2017, at the age of 86.

== See also ==
- NAACP in Kentucky

== Additional resources ==
- "Living the Story: The Civil Rights Movement in Kentucky – Audrey Grevious". Kentucky Educational Television: Education, Public Affairs, Arts and Culture, Online Video. Ed. Betsy Brinson, Tracy K'Meyer, Arthur Rouse, and Joan Brannon. Kentucky Oral History Commission, 2001. Accessed 16 September 2010.
- Oral History Interviews with Audrey Louise Grevious, Louie B. Nunn Center for Oral History, University of Kentucky Libraries
- Johnson, Larry. "An Unsung Hero: Audrey Rice Grevious". Kentucky Women in the Civil Rights Era. Accessed December 5, 2010.
- "NAACP (National Association for the Advancement of Colored People)". Notable Kentucky African Americans Database, University of Kentucky Libraries. Accessed December 5, 2010.
