= Benjamin Hooks =

American civil rights leader and minister

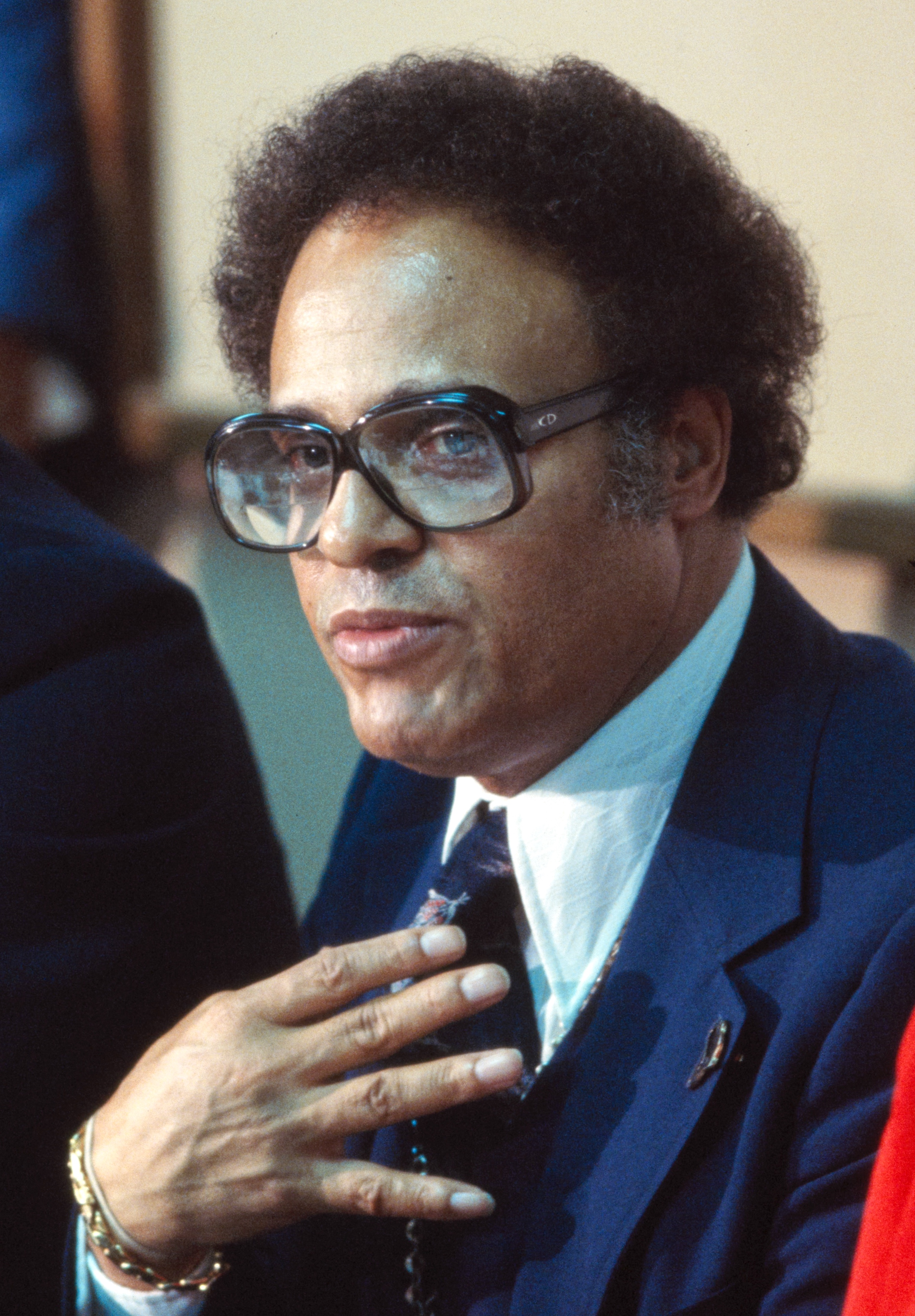
- Hooks in the 1970s

Executive Director of the National Association for the Advancement of Colored People
- In office 1977–1992
- Preceded by: Roy Wilkins (Executive Secretary)
- Succeeded by: Benjamin Chavis

Personal details
- Born: January 31, 1925 Memphis, Tennessee, U.S.
- Died: April 15, 2010 (aged 85) Memphis, Tennessee, U.S.
- Resting place: Elmwood Cemetery
- Spouse: Frances Dancy
- Children: 1
- Relatives: Julia Britton Hooks (parental grandmother)
- Education: LeMoyne-Owen College; Howard University (BA); DePaul University (JD)

Military service
- Allegiance: United States
- Branch/service: United States Army
- Years of service: 1944–1945
- Rank: Staff Sergeant
- Battles/wars: World War II

Benjamin Lawson Hooks (January 31, 1925 – April 15, 2010) was an American civil rights leader and government official. A Baptist minister and practicing attorney, he served as executive director of the National Association for the Advancement of Colored People (NAACP) from 1977 to 1992.

Throughout his career, Hooks was a vocal campaigner for civil rights in the United States, and served from July 5, 1972 – July 25, 1977 as the first African American member of the Federal Communications Commission (FCC).

== Early life ==
Benjamin Hooks was born in Memphis, Tennessee. Growing up on South Lauderdale and Vance, he was the fifth son of Robert B and Bessie White Hooks. He had six siblings. His father was a photographer and owned a photography studio with his brother Henry, known at the time as Hooks Brothers, and the family was fairly comfortable by the standards of black people for the day. He recalled that he had to wear hand-me-down clothes and that his mother had to be careful to make the dollars stretch to feed and care for the family.

Young Benjamin's paternal grandmother, Julia Britton Hooks (1852–1942), graduated from Berea College in Kentucky in 1874 and was only the second American black woman to graduate from college. She was a musical prodigy. She began playing piano publicly at age five and at age 18, joined Berea's faculty, teaching instrumental music 1870–72. Her sister, Dr. Mary E. Britton, also attended Berea, and became a physician in Lexington, Kentucky.

With such a family legacy, young Benjamin was inspired to work hard on his academic career, with hopes of being able to make it to college. In his youth, he felt a calling to the Christian ministry. His father, however, did not approve and discouraged Benjamin from such a calling.

Benjamin was a member of the Omega Psi Phi fraternity.

In 1952 he married Frances Dancy, a 24-year-old science teacher.

== Education ==
Hooks enrolled in LeMoyne-Owen College, in Memphis, Tennessee. There he undertook a pre-law course of study 1941–43. In his college years he became more acutely aware that he was one of a large number of Americans who were required to use segregated lunch counters, water fountains, and restrooms. "I wish I could tell you every time I was on the highway and couldn’t use a restroom," he would later recall. "My bladder is messed up because of that. Stomach is messed up from eating cold sandwiches."

After graduating in 1944 from Howard University, he joined the Army and had the job of guarding Italian prisoners of war. He found it humiliating that the prisoners were allowed to eat in restaurants from which he was barred. He was discharged from the Army after the end of the war with the rank of staff sergeant.

After the war he enrolled at the DePaul University College of Law in Chicago to study law. No law school in his native Tennessee would admit him. He graduated from DePaul in 1948 with his Juris Doctor (J.D.) degree.

== Legal career ==
Upon graduation Hooks immediately returned to his native Memphis. By this time he was thoroughly committed to breaking down the practices of racial segregation that existed in the United States. Fighting prejudice at every turn, he passed the Tennessee bar exam and set up his own law practice. "At that time you were insulted by law clerks, excluded from white bar associations and when I was in court, I was lucky to be called Ben," he recalled in an interview with Jet magazine. "Usually it was just ‘boy.’ [But] the judges were always fair. The discrimination of those days has changed and, today, the South is ahead of the North in many respects in civil rights progress." In 1949 Hooks was one of only a few black lawyers in Memphis.

Hooks was a friend and associate of Dr. T.R.M. Howard, the head of the Regional Council of Negro Leadership (RCNL), a leading civil rights organization in Mississippi. Hooks attended the RCNL's annual conferences in the all-black town of Mound Bayou, Mississippi which often drew crowds of ten thousand or more. In 1954, only days before the U.S. Supreme Court handed down Brown v. Board of Education of Topeka, he appeared on an RCNL-sponsored roundtable, along with Thurgood Marshall, and other black Southern attorneys to formulate possible litigation strategies.

== Other endeavors ==
Hooks always felt drawn to the Christian church, and in 1956 he was ordained as a Baptist minister and began to preach regularly at the Greater Middle Baptist Church in Memphis, while continuing his busy law practice. He joined Martin Luther King Jr., and other leaders, at the initial January 1957 Southern Negro Leaders Conference on Transportation and Nonviolent Integration, which organized itself, by August, as the Southern Christian Leadership Conference (SCLC), with whom he became an active participant in the NAACP-sponsored restaurant sit-ins and other boycotts of consumer items and services.

In addition to his other roles, he decided to enter Tennessee state politics and ran unsuccessfully for the state legislature in 1954 and for juvenile court judge in 1959 and 1963.Though he did not win, he attracted the support of many black voters and liberal whites as well. In 1965 Tennessee Governor Frank G. Clement appointed him to fill a vacancy in the Shelby County criminal court. With this he became the first black criminal court judge in Tennessee history. His temporary appointment to the bench expired in 1966 but he campaigned for, and won election to a full term in the same judicial office.

By the late 1960s Hooks was a judge, a businessman, a lawyer, and a minister, but he continued to do more. Twice a month he flew to Detroit to preach at the Greater New Mount Moriah Baptist Church. He also continued to work with the NAACP in civil rights protests and marches. Fortunately for Hooks, his wife Frances matched him in energy and stamina. She became her husband's assistant, secretary, advisor, and traveling companion, even though it meant sacrificing her own career. "He said he needed me to help him", she told Ebony. "Few husbands tell their wives that they need them after 30 years of marriage, so I gave it up and here I am, right by his side."

Hooks had been a producer and host of several local television shows in Memphis in addition to his other duties and was a strong supporter of Republican political candidates. In 1972, President Richard Nixon appointed Hooks to be one of the five commissioners of the Federal Communications Commission (FCC). The Senate confirmed the nomination, and Benjamin and Frances Hooks moved to Washington, D.C. in 1973. As a member of the FCC, Hooks addressed the lack of minority ownership of television and radio stations, the minority employment statistics for the broadcasting industry, and the image of blacks in the mass media. Hooks completed his five-year term on the board of commissioners in 1978, but he continued to work for black involvement in the entertainment industry.

== Fraternal Organizations ==
Hooks was involved with several Black fraternal organization often serving in leadership roles. He served as the Supreme Chancellor of the Knights of Pythias, Grand Secretary of the Grand Lodge of Tennessee, Prince Hall, honorary Past Imperial Potentate of the Ancient Egyptian Arabic Order of the Nobles of the Mystic Shrine, a 33rd degree Scottish Rite mason, and was a member and received the Elks' Elijah Parish Lovejoy Award in 1989 from the Improved Benevolent and Protective Order of Elks of the World.

== The NAACP ==
On November 6, 1976, the 64-member board of directors of the NAACP elected Hooks executive director of the organization. In the late 1970s the membership had declined from a high of about 500,000 to only about 200,000. Hooks was determined to add to the enrollment and to raise money for the organization's severely depleted treasury, without changing the NAACP's goals or mandates. "Black Americans are not defeated," he told Ebony soon after his formal induction in 1977. "The civil rights movement is not dead. If anyone thinks that we are going to stop agitating, they had better think again. If anyone thinks that we are going to stop litigating, they had better close the courts. If anyone thinks that we are not going to demonstrate and protest, they had better roll up the sidewalks."

In his early years at the NAACP, Hooks had some bitter arguments with Margaret Bush Wilson, chairwoman of the NAACP's board of directors. At one point in 1983, Wilson summarily suspended Hooks after a quarrel over the organization's policy. Wilson accused Hooks of mismanagement but the charges were never proven. A majority of the board backed Hooks and he never officially left his post In 1980, Hooks explained why the NAACP was against using violence to obtain civil rights:

There are a lot of ways an oppressed people can rise. One way to rise is to study, to be smarter than your oppressor. The concept of rising against oppression through physical contact is stupid and self-defeating. It exalts brawn over brain. And the most enduring contributions made to civilization have not been made by brawn, they have been made by brain.

== Views on equality ==
Early in 1990 Hooks and his family were among the targets in a wave of bombings against civil rights leaders. Hooks visited President George H. W. Bush in the White House to discuss the escalating tensions between races. He emerged from that meeting with the government's full support against racially motivated bomb attacks, but he was very critical of the administration's apparent lack of action concerning inner city poverty and lack of support for public education.

On the other hand, Hooks would not lay all the blame for America's ills at the feet of its elected officials. He had been a staunch advocate of self-help among the black community, urging wealthy and middle-class blacks to give time and resources to those less fortunate. "It’s time today... to bring it out of the closet: No longer can we proffer polite, explicable, reasons why Black America cannot do more for itself," he told the 1990 NAACP convention delegates. "I’m calling for a moratorium on excuses. I challenge black America today—all of us—to set aside our alibis."

By 1991 some younger members of the NAACP thought that Hooks had lost touch with black America and ought to resign. One newspaper wrote: "Critics say the organization is a dinosaur whose national leadership is still living in the glory days of the civil rights movement." Dr. Frederick Zak, a young local NAACP president, was quoted as saying, "There is a tendency by some of the older people to romanticize the struggle—especially the marching and the picketing and the boycotting and the going to jail."

Hooks felt that the perilous times of the civil rights movement should never be taken for granted, especially by those who were born in the aftermath of the movement's gains. "A young black man can’t understand what it means to have something he’s never been denied,’ Hooks told U.S. News & World Report. "I can’t make them understand the mental relief I feel at the rights we have. It almost infuriates me that people don’t understand what integration has done for this country."

== Retirement ==
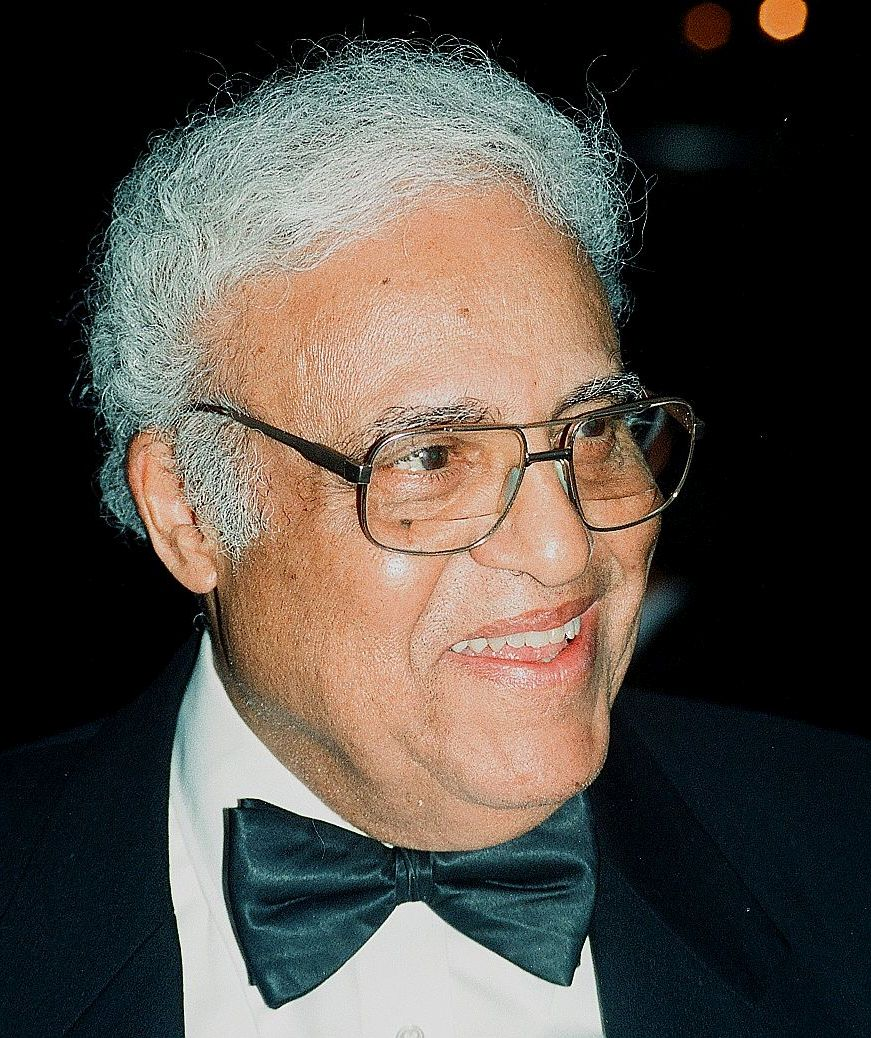
Hooks in 1995

Hooks and his wife handled the NAACP's business and helped to plan for its future for more than 15 years. He told the New York Times that a "sense of duty and responsibility" to the NAACP compelled him to stay in office through the 1990s, but eventually the demands of the executive director position proved too great for a man of his age. In February 1992, at the age of 67, he announced his resignation from the post, calling it "a killing job," according to the Detroit Free Press. Hooks stated that he would serve out the 1992 year and predicted that a change in leadership would not jeopardize the NAACP's stability: "We’ve been through some little stormy periods before. I think we’ll overcome it."

Hooks served as a distinguished adjunct professor for the Political Science department of the University of Memphis. Hooks also resumed preaching at the Greater Middle Baptist Church in Memphis where he had begun preaching in 1956. On March 24, 2001, Benjamin Hooks and Frances Hooks renewed their wedding vows for the third time, after nearly 50 years of marriage. The ceremony was held in the Greater Middle Baptist Church in Memphis . Hooks died on April 15, 2010, at 85 years old. His funeral was held at Temple of Deliverance Church of God in Christ on April 21, 2010.

== The Benjamin L. Hooks Institute for Social Change at the University of Memphis ==
Founded in 1996 by Hooks and faculty of the department of political science at the University of Memphis, the Benjamin L. Hooks Institute for Social Change at the University of Memphis is dedicated to preserving the history of the civil rights movement and continuing the struggle for equality championed by its namesake. The Hooks Institute is housed within the College of Arts and Sciences at the University of Memphis. The mission of the Hooks Institute is teaching, studying and promoting civil rights and social change. This mission is implemented through a variety of programs focused on scholarship of the civil rights movement, public policy research and scholarship, commemorations and grants focused on continuing scholarship of the civil rights movement, public events focused on civil rights and social change, media focused on the civil rights movement including documentary films and websites, and direct engagement programs to improve the conditions of marginalized communities.

== Professional memberships ==
- American Bar Association
- National Bar Association
- Tennessee Bar Association
- Southern Christian Leadership Conference
- Tennessee Council on Human Relations

== Honors and awards ==
- Hooks was awarded the Spingarn Medal from the National Association for the Advancement of Colored People, 1986.
- In 1988, Hooks received an honorary doctorate at Central Connecticut State University.
- In 1992, Hooks received the Adam Clayton Powell Award from the Congressional Black Caucus Foundation
- NAACP created the Benjamin L. Hooks Distinguished Service Award, which is awarded to persons for efforts in implementing policies and programs which promote equal opportunity.
- University of Memphis created the Benjamin L. Hooks Institute for Social Change. The Hooks Institute is committed to bringing scholars together to advance the goals of the civil rights movement, to promote human rights and democratic government worldwide, and to honor the lifetime of work of Hooks.
- Hooks received the Presidential Medal of Freedom from President George W. Bush in November 2007.
- Was inducted in the International Civil Rights Walk of Fame at the Martin Luther King, Jr. National Historic Site on January 12, 2008
- The Memphis Public Library's main branch is named in his honor.
- The University of Memphis Cecil C. Humphreys School of Law Alumni Chapter honored Hooks as a 2007 Pillar of Excellence.

== See also ==
- List of African-American jurists
- List of first minority male lawyers and judges in Tennessee
