= Mary E. Britton =

African-American physician (1855–1925)

Dr. Mary Ellen Britton
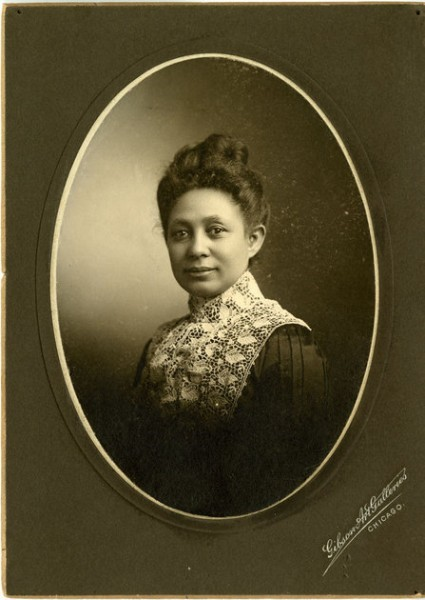
- Born: April 05, 1855; Lexington, Kentucky, US
- Died: August 27, 1925 (aged 70); Lexington, Kentucky, US
- Burial place: Cove Haven Cemetery
- Education: Berea College, American Missionary Medical College of Chicago
- Known for: First African-American female physician in Lexington, Kentucky
- Medical career
- Field: Hydrotherapy, electrotherapy

Mary Ellen Britton (1855–1925) was an American physician, educator, suffragist, journalist and civil rights activist from Lexington, Kentucky. Britton was an original member of the Kentucky Negro Education Association, which formed in 1877. She was president of the Lexington Woman's Improvement Club and later served as a charter member of the Ladies Orphan Society which founded the Colored Orphan Industrial Home in Lexington, in 1892. During her lifetime she accomplished many things through the obstacles she faced. After teaching black children in Lexington public schools, she worked as a doctor from her home in Lexington. She specialized in hydrotherapy, electrotherapy and massage; and, she was officially granted her license to practice medicine in Lexington, Kentucky in 1902, making her the first woman doctor to be licensed in Lexington.

== Background and early life ==
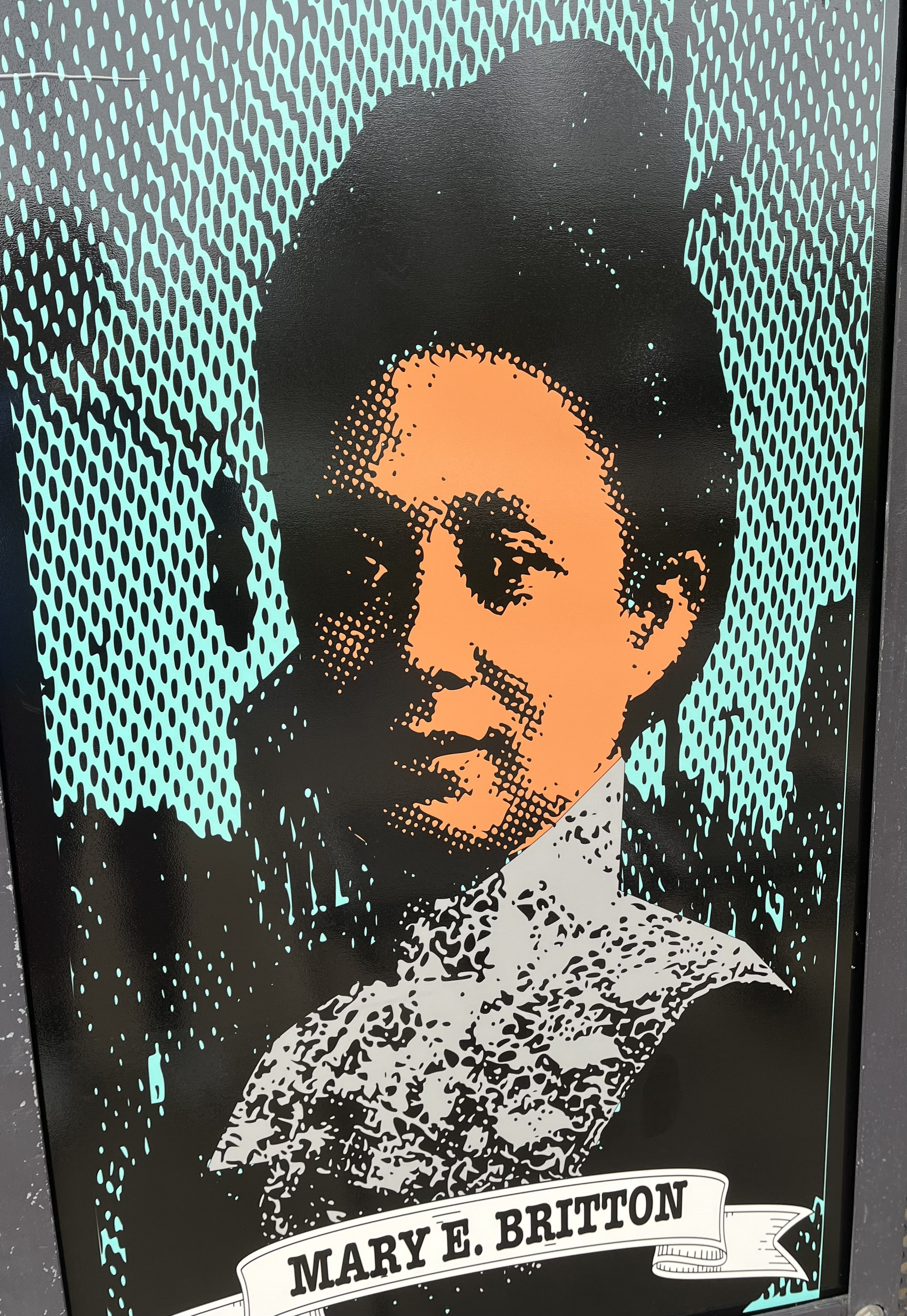
Public art portray of Britton located at the intersection of Third St, and Elm Tree Lane in Lexington KY.

Mary Ellen Britton was born as a free person of color on April 5, 1855, the only one of her siblings for whom a record of birth can be located. She was one of seven children of Laura and Henry Britton who lived on Mill Street, somewhere between Second and Third Streets which is now in the Gratz Park Historical District of Lexington, Kentucky. Contrary to the limited opportunities many other African-Americans of the time were allowed, she and her siblings—Susan J. (born 1850), Julia (born 1852), Joseph (also known as Josiah, born 1856), Robert H. (born 1857), Martha (born 1860), William (born 1867) and Hattie (born 1868), Lucy (born ca. 1872), and Thomas Marshall (born 1873) — all acquired a classical education. Her father Henry was a freeborn carpenter (born around 1824) of Spanish/Indian heritage who later became a barber in Lexington and Berea. Her mother, Laura Trigg, was a gifted singer and musician who had been well-educated under the protection of her mother who was an enslaved mistress to Kentucky statesman Thomas F. Marshall. Laura had been emancipated at the age of sixteen.

At a young age Britton was offered the best education possible for African American children in that time - attending private schools created out of subscriptions from Lexington's African-American professional class. In 1859, along with older sister Julia Britton Hooks (later known as a gifted musician and educator, as well as Berea's first African American teacher), Britton attended a branch school in Lexington started by Mr. William H. Gibson of Louisville, Kentucky. The family later moved to Berea, Kentucky where Laura Britton was hired as a matron at Berea College.

From 1871 to 1874, Mary E. Britton attended Berea College, the first institution of higher learning to admit blacks in the state of Kentucky. At the time the only profession offered to an educated woman of any race was teaching. While she was there as a student, she was also a part of the faculty teaching instrumental music - making her the first African-American to teach white students at Berea. After the death of both her parents (within four months of each other in 1874), Britton left Berea in order to seek employment. She taught in the Lexington School System beginning around 1876 and ending in August 1897.

== Professional career ==
After leaving Berea, Britton taught in several schools in central Kentucky and advocated for the improvement of pedagogy in African-American schools. Her paper entitled "Literary Culture of the Teacher" was presented at the second meeting of the Kentucky Negro Education Association (KNEA) in Louisville in 1879. At the Ninth Annual Convention of the KNEA in Danville, she gave two speeches, the second of which (on July 6, 1887), she spoke out on behalf of woman suffrage. In her speech, which later was published as "Woman's Suffrage: A Potent Agency in Public Reform," she argued that women, like men, had a right to define their own fate within the laws of the land, and that laws should be equally applied to both women and men. She wrote: "If woman is the same as man then she has the same rights, if she is distinct from man then she has a right to the ballot to help make laws for her government." In 1894 she presented "History and Science of Teaching" before the American Association of Educators of Colored Youth in Baltimore, Maryland.

On April 15, 1892, Britton presented a speech to the joint Railroad Committee of the Kentucky General Assembly on behalf of a delegation of women protesting the Separate Coach bill. In her speech, she questioned the white supremacists' assumptions about their monopoly on virtue, intelligence, and aestheticism - reminding the legislators of the horrors of slavery and atrocities by whites that were allowed. She also decried the segregationist approach of punishing a whole group of people simply because of their shared color of skin when only one African-American was convicted and punished for a crime committed. Britton argued on behalf of all Americans and their right to "life, liberty, and the pursuit of happiness" concluding that a law based solely on race was unjust and un-American.

That same year, Britton and 19 other women met at St. Paul A.M.E. Church to establish the Ladies Orphans' Home Society. This group raised the money and created the Colored Orphan Industrial Home in Lexington, Kentucky. This organization provided food, shelter, education and training to destitute orphans and elderly, homeless women until it closed in 1988.

In 1893 Britton tested whether the grand "White City" in Chicago for the World's Columbian Exposition of 1893 was open to blacks. African-American participation in the exhibits had been very limited, leading to calls for protests. According to Karen Cotton McDaniel, Britton was curious if the Kentucky building in the Exposition would allow her entrance. Her open defiance of white supremacy at the door of the Kentucky exhibit—and subsequent "humiliation, indignation and other strains she experienced" was highly publicized.

She resigned from teaching in 1897 to work at the Battle Creek Sanitarium in Michigan where she learned about hydrotherapy, phototherapy, thermotherapy, electrotherapy and mechanotherapy—the strategies and health principles advocated by the Seventh-day Adventist Church to which she belonged. She attended classes there with the American Medical Missionary College and took classes in Chicago, graduating in 1902. She returned home and became the first African-American woman licensed to practice medicine in Lexington, Kentucky. After about a year, she built home and office at 545 North Limestone Street (fronting Rand Avenue) where she practiced for over twenty years.

== Other accomplishments and attributions ==
Britton was an original member of the Kentucky Negro Education Association which was formed in 1877 to improve schools for African-American children and to make statewide changes through legislative action. She was also President of the Lexington Woman's Improvement Club. The initial goal for this club was the "elevation of women, the enriching and betterment of home, and the encitement of proper pride and interest in race." For many years, the Club managed a Day Nursery for the children of working mothers.

Her writings on moral and social reform can be found in local newspapers such as the Lexington American Citizen and the Lexington Daily Transcript—she wrote a regular women's column in the Lexington Herald (signed "Meb"). She also wrote for the Cleveland Gazette, the Indianapolis World, the Baltimore Ivy and the American Catholic Tribune in Cincinnati.

== Death ==
Dr. Britton never married nor had children. Most of her siblings died before her, most at an early age. Martha and Joseph died in childhood sometime after 1860; Hattie shot herself in the head at the age of 23 while living with sister Julia in Memphis. Thomas, her youngest brother, went on to become a successful jockey, but in 1901 at the age of 28 and banned from many racetracks he committed suicide by drinking carbolic acid. Lucy had married Will F. "Monk" Overton (a jockey whose career was also overturned by Jim Crow), but died in her early thirties from acute nephritis. In 1914 the eldest sister, Susan who was the wife of a prominent African-American barber in Lexington named Benjamin Franklin, died. Dr. Britton retired from her medical practice at the age of 68 in 1923.

Mary E. Britton died in Lexington's St. Joseph Hospital on August 27, 1925, only a few hours after she had been admitted. The Blue Grass Medical Society published a proclamation in the Lexington Leader (August 30, 1925) describing their esteem for her work and character.

She willed most of her estate to her sister Julia Britton Hooks and Julia's sons, and she gave her library to the Seventh-day Adventist Church.

A middle school under construction in Lexington KY to be opened in 2025 is named in her honor.

== Bibliography ==
- Apbasova, Sona (23 February 2014). "Mary E. Britton". Hutchins Library Highlights: The Official Blog for Hutchins Library at Berea College.
- Eblen, Tom (February 14, 2012). "Mary Britton Was A Woman Ahead Of Her Time". Lexington Herald Leader.
- McDaniel, Karen Cotton (December 5, 2015). "Mary Ellen Britton: A Potent Agent for Public Reform". H-Net: Humanities & Social Sciences Online.
- Smith, Gerald L. "African-Americans & the Struggle for Equality". Kentucky African American Encyclopedia.
- Wilkinson, Doris (1992). Britton, Mary E. The Kentucky Encyclopedia. p. 125. ISBN 0813128838.
