= Louisville Defender =

American weekly newspaper

Coordinates: 38.226°N 85.792°W

- Type: Weekly newspaper
- Format: Broadsheet
- Editor: Yvonne Bach
- General manager: Clarence Leslie
- Founded: 1933
- Language: American English
- Headquarters: 1720 Dixie Highway, Louisville, Kentucky, United States
- Circulation: 1,115
- OCLC number: 10644972
- Website: Official website

Louisville Defender is a weekly newspaper in Louisville, Kentucky.

== History ==
Louisville Defender was founded in 1933 by Alvin H. Bowman of Louisville and John Sengstacke of Chicago, as an affiliate of the Chicago Defender. It joined The Louisville Leader and Louisville News as African-American newspapers in the city.

Frank L. Stanley Sr. bought Sengstacke's share in 1936, and published the paper for the next 37 years. By 1942, the newspaper had reached its target circulation of 15,000. The paper became profitable after purchasing its own printing press in 1956. Circulation dipped in 1953 when it became a tabloid, and dropped to 10,000 in the 1960s when other major newspapers started hiring African Americans to cover civil right issues in their papers.

Stanley's column, "Being Frank", became nationally syndicated in the 1940s. During the 1950s the paper covered issues related to integrated public accommodation, and in the 1950s and 1960s it covered open housing, equal job opportunities, and desegregated schools.

After Stanley's death in 1974, his wife and sons became co-publishers. Circulation dropped to 2,600 weekly by 1985, and the family sold its ownership to Consumer Communications Industries Corporation headed by Clarence Leslie. As of 2020, weekly circulation was listed as 1,115.

=== Photography ===
Bud Dorsey was a full-time photographer for the Defender for more than 20 years when he retired in 2002.
