= List of museums in Kentucky =

This list of museums in Kentucky is a list of museums, defined for this context as institutions (including nonprofit organizations, government entities, and private businesses) that collect and care for objects of cultural, artistic, scientific, or historical interest and make their collections or related exhibits available for public viewing. Museums that exist only in cyberspace (i.e., virtual museums) are not included.

== Museums ==
Name	Image	Location	County	Region	Area of study	Summary
1817 Saddle Factory Museum		Russellville	Logan	South Central Kentucky	Industry	History of the saddle factory, its workers and products, operated by Historic Russellville
Abraham Lincoln Birthplace National Historical Park		Hodgenville	LaRue	Derby Region	Biographical	Preserves two farm sites where Abraham Lincoln lived as a child.
Adsmore		Princeton	Caldwell	Western Waterlands	Living	Victorian home with "living" tours by season
African American Heritage Center		Franklin	Simpson	South Central Kentucky	African American	website, African American achievements in Simpson County and Kentucky
Alexander Arthur Museum		Middlesboro	Bell	Daniel Boone Country	Biographical	Display of personal items owned by Alexander Arthur and his family
American Cave Museum		Horse Cave	Hart	South Central Kentucky	Natural history	website, caves, groundwater, pollution and tour of Hidden River Cave
American Saddlebred Museum		Lexington	Fayette	Bluegrass	Local history	website, part of Kentucky Horse Park, history of the American Saddlebred, art, trophies, photographs, tack
Ashland, The Henry Clay Estate		Lexington	Fayette	Bluegrass	Historic house	Plantation of the 19th-century Kentucky statesman Henry Clay
Atkinson-Griffin Log House		Campbellsville	Taylor	Daniel Boone Country	Historic house	Served as a Confederate hospital after the Battle of Tebbs Bend
Auburn Museum		Auburn	Logan	South Central Kentucky	Local history	website, operated by the Auburn Historical Society
Aviation Heritage Park		Bowling Green	Warren	South Central Kentucky	Aviation	website, park display of an F-4 Phantom II, planned display of other aircraft
Aviation Museum of Kentucky		Lexington	Fayette	Bluegrass	Aviation	Historic airplanes, photos, documents and training equipment
Bardstown Historical Museum		Bardstown	Nelson	Derby Region	Local history	Located in Spalding Hall along with the Oscar Getz Museum of Whiskey History
Barlow House Museum		Barlow	Ballard	Western Waterlands	Historic house	Late 19th-century house
Barthell Coal Mining Camp		Whitley City	McCreary	South Central Kentucky	Mining	Open-air museum includes museum, barber shop, bath house, doctor's office, machine shop, mining motor displays, school/church house, 1890s reconstructed log cabin and mine tour
Behringer-Crawford Museum		Covington	Kenton	Northern Kentucky	Local history	website, regional history of Northern Kentucky
Bell County Coal House and Museum		Middlesboro	Bell	Daniel Boone Country	Mining	House made of coal and outdoor display on local coal mines
Bell County Historical Society Museum		Middlesboro	Bell	Daniel Boone Country	Local history	website, operated by the Bell County Historical Society
Ben E. Clement Mineral Museum		Marion	Crittenden	Western Waterlands	Natural history	website, minerals including large collection of fluorite specimens
Bibb House Museum		Russellville	Logan	South Central Kentucky	Historic house	Open by appointment with Historic Russellville
Big Bone Lick State Park		Big Bone	Boone	Northern Kentucky	Natural history	Visitor center includes fossils found in the park, and the Outdoor Museum features a recreated bog diorama with extinct animals
Big Sandy Heritage Center Museum		Pikeville	Pike	Big Sandy River watershed	Regional history	Emphasis on Hatfield-McCoy Feud
Bill Monroe Museum		Rosine	Ohio	Bluegrass, Blues & Barbecue region	Biographical	Life of Bill Monroe and the early foundations of bluegrass music
BitterSweet Cabin Museum		Renfro Valley	Rockcastle	Daniel Boone Country	Open-air	website, log cabin museum village and stores
Black History Gallery		Elizabethtown	Hardin	Derby Region	African American	Display of photos, articles and biographies of black Americans
Blue Heron Coal Mining Camp		Blue Heron	McCreary	South Central Kentucky	Mining	Restored former company town
Bluegrass Heritage Museum		Winchester	Clark	Bluegrass	Local history	
Bluegrass Motorcycle Museum		Rosine	Ohio	Bluegrass, Blues & Barbecue region	Transportation	Private collection of over 20 vintage, American made motorcycles and memorabilia, open by appointment
Bluegrass Railroad and Museum		Versailles	Woodford	Bluegrass	Railroad	Heritage railroad and museum
Blue Licks Battlefield State Park		Mount Olivet	Robertson	Northern Kentucky	Local history	Pioneer Museum includes exhibits about the battle during the American Revolution, local natural and cultural history
Bobby Davis Museum and Park		Hazard	Perry	Daniel Boone Country	Local history	
Breathitt County Museum		Jackson	Breathitt	Daniel Boone Country	Local history	
Breckinridge County Historical Society Museum		Hardinsburg	Breckinridge	Derby Region	Local history	website
Brennan House & Medical Office Museum		Louisville	Jefferson	Derby Region	Historic house	Victorian mansion
Brown-Pusey House		Elizabethtown	Hardin	Derby Region	Historic house	Includes the Pusey Room Museum with a replica of a late 19th-century medical office, a genealogical library, and meeting rooms
Bullitt County History Museum		Shepherdsville	Bullitt	Derby Region	Local history	website, operated by the Bullitt County Genealogical Society
Butler-Turpin State Historic House		Carrollton	Carroll	Northern Kentucky	Historic house	Located in General Butler State Resort Park, mid-19th-century house
Caldwell County Railroad Museum		Princeton	Caldwell	Western Waterlands	Railroad	website, railroad artifacts and memorabilia.
Camp Breckinridge Museum & Arts Center		Morganfield	Union	Bluegrass, Blues & Barbecue region	Historic site	website, former officer's club, features murals painted by a German POW
Camp Nelson Civil War Heritage Park		Nicholasville	Jessamine	Bluegrass	Civil War	Union Army supply depot and recruiting station for African American soldiers
Cane Ridge Meeting House & Barton Warren Stone Museum		Paris	Bourbon	Bluegrass	Religious	History of the former camp meeting site
Capital City Museum		Frankfort	Franklin	Bluegrass	Local history	website
The Carnegie		Covington	Kenton	Northern Kentucky	Art	website, multidisciplinary arts venue with galleries
C.B. Caudill Store & History Center		Blackey	Letcher	Daniel Boone Country	Local history	website
Civil War Museum		Bardstown	Nelson	Derby Region	Multiple	Five attractions, including Civil War Museum of the Western Theater, Old Bardstown Village Village with 10 log cabins, Women's Civil War Museum, Wildlife Museum and War Memorial of Mid America
Cloverfork Museum		Evarts	Harlan	Daniel Boone Country	Local history	website, located in Highsplint, a former coal town
Cloverport Depot Museum		Cloverport	Breckinridge	Derby Region	Local history	
Columbus-Belmont State Park		Columbus	Hickman	Western Waterlands	Civil War	Civil War history of the area and local natural and cultural history
Conrad-Caldwell House		Louisville	Jefferson	Derby Region	Historic house	Late 19th-century mansion
Constitution Square Historic Site		Danville	Boyle	Bluegrass	Open-air	Includes replica of 1785 log courthouse, jail and meetinghouse, 1792 post office
Coal Miners' Museum		Van Lear	Johnson	Kentucky's Appalachians	Mining	Local coal mining history
Creation Museum		Petersburg	Boone	Northern Kentucky	Religious	
Crittenden County Historical Museum		Marion	Crittenden	Western Waterlands	Local history	website
Cumberland Gap National Historical Park		Middlesboro	Bell	Daniel Boone Country	History	Includes the Visitor Center with museum exhibits about the area's natural and cultural history, and Hensley Settlement, an open-air mountain community
Cumberland Inn & Museum		Williamsburg	Whitley	Daniel Boone Country	Multiple	Natural history, collections of crosses, coins, stamps, arrowheads and nutcrackers
Cynthiana Museum		Cynthiana	Harrison	Bluegrass	Local history	website
David A. Zegeer Coal-Railroad Museum		Jenkins	Letcher	Daniel Boone Country	Mining	Coal mining and railroad history
Dawson Springs Museum and Art Center		Dawson Springs	Hopkins	Bluegrass, Blues & Barbecue region	Local history	Local history and art
Dinsmore Homestead		Burlington	Boone	Northern Kentucky	Historic house	1840s house on 30 acres (120,000 m^{2})
Don F. Pratt Memorial Museum		Fort Campbell	Christian	Western Waterlands	Military	History of Fort Campbell and the 101st Airborne Division Air Assault the "Screaming Eagles"
Duncan Tavern		Paris	Bourbon	Bluegrass	Historic site	website, state headquarters of the Kentucky Society, NSDAR; 18th-century tavern
East Kentucky Science Center		Prestonsburg	Floyd	Kentucky's Appalachians	Science	Includes exhibit hall, planetarium and laser dome
Elkhorn City Railroad Museum		Elkhorn City	Pike	Kentucky's Appalachians	Railroad	History of railroads in Kentucky's Eastern Mountain Coal Fields region
Embroidery Museum and Resource Center		Louisville	Jefferson	Derby Region	Textile	Operated by the Embroiderer's Guild of America, exhibits of embroidered items
Ephraim McDowell House		Danville	Boyle	Bluegrass	Historic house	Early 19th-century doctor's office, house and apothecary shop
Explorium of Lexington		Lexington	Fayette	Bluegrass	Children's	website, formerly known as the Lexington Children's Museum
Fairholme (John Street Home)		Cadiz	Trigg	Western Waterlands	Historic house	website, tours by appointment, also known as the John L. Street Home
Farmington Historic Home		Louisville	Jefferson	Derby Region	Historic house	Early 19th-century plantation home
Federal Hill		Bardstown	Nelson	Derby Region	Historic house	Also known as My Old Kentucky Home, early 19th-century mansion, part of My Old Kentucky Home State Park
The Filson Historical Society		Louisville	Jefferson	Derby Region	Local history	Includes a museum of local history and art exhibits
Fleming County Covered Bridge Museum		Flemingsburg	Fleming	Bluegrass	Local history	
Fordsville Depot Museum		Fordsville	Ohio	Bluegrass, Blues & Barbecue region	Multiple	website, includes local history, railroad and rural life displays
Forkland Community Center Lincoln Museum		Forkland	Boyle	Bluegrass	Local history	website, community heritage, including local connections to Lucey Shipley Hanks Sparrow, who was the grandmother of Abraham Lincoln
Fort Boonesborough State Park		Boonesborough	Madison	Bluegrass	Fort	Reconstructed pioneer fort with artisans
Francis M. Stafford House		Paintsville	Johnson	Kentucky's Appalachians	Historic house	19th-century house, open by appointment
Frazier History Museum		Louisville	Jefferson	Museum Row	Kentucky History	Where the World meets Kentucky Kentucky history, culture and people.
Friendship School		Campbellsville	Taylor	Daniel Boone Country	Education	1918 one room schoolhouse
Garrard County Jail Museum		Lancaster	Garrard	Bluegrass	Prison	
General George Patton Museum of Leadership		Fort Knox	Hardin	Derby Region	Biographical	
Georgetown & Scott County Museum		Georgetown	Scott	Bluegrass	Local history	website
Georgetown College Fine Art Galleries		Georgetown	Scott	Bluegrass	Art	website, includes the Jacobs Gallery, Cochenour Gallery, Anne Wright Wilson Fine Art Gallery, and Live. Learn. Believe. Sculpture Exhibition
Glema Mahr Center for the Arts		Madisonville	Hopkins	Bluegrass, Blues & Barbecue region	Art	website, part of Madisonville Community College, features the Anne P. Baker Gallery of fine art
Governor William Owsley House		Lancaster	Garrard	Bluegrass	Historic house	Also known as Pleasant Retreat
Great American Dollhouse Museum		Danville	Boyle	Bluegrass	Toy	website, over 200 dollhouses, miniature buildings and room boxes
Green River Female Academy		Elkton	Todd	Western Waterlands	Education	19th-century female seminary
Hancock County Museum		Hawesville	Hancock	Bluegrass, Blues & Barbecue region	Local history	website, housed in the old railroad station
Hardin County History Museum		Elizabethtown	Hardin	Derby Region	Local history	website
Harland Sanders Café and Museum		Corbin	Laurel	South Central Kentucky	Food	Birthplace of Kentucky Fried Chicken
Harriet Beecher Stowe Slavery to Freedom Museum		Maysville	Mason	Northern Kentucky	Biographical	Located in the Marshall Key House, said to be where author Harriet Beecher Stowe got some of the ideas for her book Uncle Tom's Cabin
Hart County Historical Museum		Munfordville	Hart	South Central Kentucky	Local history	website, operated by the Hart County Historical Society
Headley-Whitney Museum		Lexington	Fayette	Bluegrass	Art	website, decorative arts including jewelry, bibelots and mounted semi-precious stones, doll houses, shell grotto, changing exhibits
Hickman County Museum		Clinton	Hickman	Western Waterlands	Local history	
Hiestand House Museum		Campbellsville	Taylor	Daniel Boone Country	Historic house	1823 German stone house with exhibits about county history House was hit by 1863 Morgan's Raid.
Highlands Museum and Discovery Center		Ashland	Boyd	Kentucky's Appalachians	History	Local history and specialized science displays
Historical Society of Hopkins County Museum		Madisonville	Hopkins	Bluegrass, Blues & Barbecue region	Local history	website, includes Ruby Laffoon cabin
Historic Locust Grove		Louisville	Jefferson	Derby Region	Historic house	55 acre 18th-century farm homestead
Historic Railpark and Train Museum		Bowling Green	Warren	South Central Kentucky	Railroad	Historic railroad station, locomotives and railroad equipment
Homeplace on Green River		Campbellsville	Taylor	Daniel Boone Country	Farm	website, 19th-century period demonstration farm on 227 acres
Hopewell Museum		Paris	Bourbon	Bluegrass	Local history	website, history and culture of Bourbon County and Central Kentucky
Hunt-Morgan House		Lexington	Fayette	Bluegrass	Historic house	18th-century home, includes Alexander T. Hunt Civil War Museum
International Bluegrass Music Museum		Owensboro	Daviess	Bluegrass, Blues & Barbecue region	Music	History of bluegrass music
Irvinton House Museum		Richmond	Madision	Bluegrass	Local history	Located in Irvine-McDowell Park
Jack Jouett House Historic Site		Versailles	Woodford	Bluegrass	Historic house	website, late 18th-century home of American Revolutionary hero Jack Jouett
James A. Ramage Civil War Museum		Fort Wright	Kenton	Northern Kentucky	History	History of Cincinnati and Northern Kentucky's involvement in the American Civil War
Janice Mason Art Museum		Cadiz	Trigg	Western Waterlands	Art	website, part of the Cadiz Community Arts Center, changing exhibits of art in all forms
Jefferson Davis State Historic Site		Fairview	Todd	Western Waterlands	Biographical	Monument and museum about Confederate leader Jefferson Davis
John James Audubon State Park		Henderson	Henderson	Bluegrass, Blues & Barbecue region	Art	Includes the Audubon Museum with art by John James Audubon and the John James Audubon Nature Center
Kentucky Coal Mining Museum		Benham	Harlan	Daniel Boone Country	Mining	Coal mining and life of the coal miner and family
Kentucky Derby Museum		Louisville	Jefferson	Derby Region	Sports	American Thoroughbred horse racing museum
Kentucky Folk Art Center		Morehead	Rowan	Kentucky's Appalachians	Art	Part of Morehead State University, self-taught art, exhibits of folk art, fine art, textiles, photography, and historical content
Kentucky Gateway Museum Center		Maysville	Mason	Northern Kentucky	Multiple	website, includes regional history dioramas and artifacts, an art gallery and Kathleen Savage Browning Miniatures Collection
Kentucky Governor's Mansion		Frankfort	Franklin	Bluegrass	Historic house	
Kentucky Museum		Bowling Green	Warren	South Central Kentucky	Multiple	On the campus of Western Kentucky University, Kentucky and US cultural history, decorative arts, Duncan Hines
Kentucky Military History Museum		Frankfort	Franklin	Bluegrass	Military	Operated by the Kentucky Historical Society
Kentucky Museum of Art and Craft		Louisville	Jefferson	Derby Region	Art	Art and craft heritage of Kentucky
Kentucky Music Hall of Fame		Renfro Valley	Rockcastle	Daniel Boone Country	Music	website
Kentucky Railway Museum		New Haven	Nelson	Derby Region	Railroad	History and heritage of Kentucky's railroads and the people who built them, includes model trains, heritage railroad
Kentucky River Museum		Boonesborough	Madison	Bluegrass	Transportation	Impact of the river, locks and dams on the area's family and commerce, open on a limited basis
Kentucky Science Center		Louisville	Jefferson	Derby Region	Science	Formerly the Louisville Science Center, hands-on science exhibits, natural history displays
Knox Historical Museum		Barbourville	Knox	Daniel Boone Country	Local history	website
La Grange Railroad Museum and Learning Center		La Grange	Oldham	Derby Region	Railroad	website
Laurel Gorge Cultural Heritage Center		Sandy Hook	Elliott	Kentucky's Appalachians	Local history	Facebook site
Lexington History Center		Lexington	Fayette	Bluegrass	Multiple	Currently closed and developing traveling displays; included the Lexington History Museum, Lexington Public Safety Museum, Isaac Scott Hathaway Museum and the Kentucky Renaissance Pharmacy Museum
Liberty Hall Historic Site		Frankfort	Franklin	Bluegrass	Historic house	Includes both Liberty Hall and Orlando Brown House
Lincoln Heritage House		Elizabethtown	Hardin	Derby Region	Historic house	Log home of Thomas Lincoln
Lincoln Homestead State Park		Springfield	Washington	Derby Region	Historic house	Includes the home of Nancy Hanks, mother of Abraham Lincoln, the replica log house of his grandmother, and the restored home of his uncle, Mordecai Lincoln
Lincoln Museum of Kentucky		Hodgenville	LaRue	Derby Region	Biographical	website, features dioramas with wax figures depicting important events in Lincoln's life and Lincoln artwork
Lloyd Tilghman House & Civil War Museum		Paducah	McCracken	Western Waterlands	History	Focuses on Kentucky and the western theater of the American Civil War
Lone Oak House Museum		Hopkinsville	Christian	Western Waterlands	Historic house	Open by appointment
Louisville Slugger Museum & Factory		Louisville	Jefferson	Derby Region	Sports	Baseball and the history of the baseball bat
Louisville Visual Art Association		Louisville	Jefferson	Derby Region	Art	website, changing art exhibits, located in the Louisville Water Tower
Ludlow Heritage Museum		Ludlow	Kenton	Northern Kentucky	Local history	
Lyon County Museum		Eddyville	Lyon	Western Waterlands	Local history	website, also known as Rose Hill Museum
Magoffin County Pioneer Village and Museum		Salyersville	Magoffin	Kentucky's Appalachians	Open-air	Reconstructed log buildings, operated by the Magoffin County Historical Society
Mammoth Cave Wildlife Museum		Cave City	Barren	South Central Kentucky	Natural history	website, mounted animal dioramas
Marie Stewart Museum & Craft Shop		Hindman	Knott	Daniel Boone Country	Local history	History of the Hindman Settlement School
Mary Todd Lincoln House		Lexington	Fayette	Bluegrass	Historic house	1840s family home of Mary Todd Lincoln
McCreary County Museum		Stearns	McCreary	South Central Kentucky	Local history	Adjacent to Big South Fork Scenic Railway, history and culture of McCreary County and the Stearns Coal & Lumber Company
McLean County History & Genealogy Museum		Calhoun	McLean	Bluegrass, Blues & Barbecue region	Local history	website, housed in the old railroad station
Mill Springs Battlefield Visitors Center and Museum		Nancy	Pulaski	South Central Kentucky	Civil War	Commemorates the January 1862 Battle of Mill Springs
Morgan County History Museum		West Liberty	Morgan	Kentucky's Appalachians	Local history	
Mountain Homeplace		Staffordsville	Johnson	Kentucky's Appalachians	Living	Mid-19th-century working farm with Museum Of Appalachian History, includes farmstead, church, school, and blacksmith shop.
Mountain Life Museum		London	Laurel	Daniel Boone Country	Open-air	Part of Levi Jackson Wilderness Road State Park, recreated pioneer village and a restored McHargue's Mill
Muhammad Ali Center		Louisville	Jefferson	Derby Region	Biographical	Life and ideals of boxer Muhammad Ali
Museum of Physical Security		Nicholasville	Jessamine	Bluegrass	Commodity	website, operated by Lockmasters Security Institute, collection of safe locks
Museum of the American Printing House for the Blind		Louisville	Jefferson	Derby Region	History	History of the education of people who are blind, and how the American Printing House for the Blind has contributed to that history
National Corvette Museum		Bowling Green	Warren	South Central Kentucky	Automotive	Showcases the Chevrolet Corvette
National Dirt Late Model Hall of Fame		Walton	Boone	Northern Kentucky	Sports	American drivers of dirt late model racecars
National Quilt Museum		Paducah	McCracken	Western Waterlands	Textile	Quilts and fiber art
National Underground Railroad Museum		Maysville	Mason	Northern Kentucky	Historic house	website, located in the Bierbower House, a safe house for the Underground Railroad
Northeastern Kentucky Museum		Olive Hill	Carter	Kentucky's Appalachians	Local history	
NKU Museum of Anthropology		Highland Heights	Campbell	Northern Kentucky	Anthropology	website, part of Northern Kentucky University, display cases on the second floor of Landrum Academic Center
Octagon Hall Museum		Franklin	Simpson	South Central Kentucky	Historic house	website
Ohio County Museum		Hartford	Ohio	Bluegrass, Blues & Barbecue region	Open-air	Includes a historic log cabin, one-room school house, historic home
Ohio County Veterans' Museum		Hartford	Ohio	Bluegrass, Blues & Barbecue region	Military	
Old Fort Harrod State Park		Harrodsburg	Mercer	Derby Region	Open-air	Reconstructed fort and museum
Old Washington Historic Village		Washington	Mason	Northern Kentucky	Open-air	website, 1780s frontier village, includes the Paxton House, a restored 1810 historical residence, historic houses, log cabins, churches, Slavery to Freedom Museum, carriage museum
Oldham County History Center		La Grange	Oldham	Derby Region	Local history	website, operated by the Oldham County Historical Society, includes the Peyton Samuel Head Family Museum, J.C. Barnett Archives and Library, and the Robb Morris Chapel
Old State Capitol		Frankfort	Franklin	Bluegrass	Historic site	Operated by the Kentucky Historical Society
Oscar Getz Museum of Whiskey History		Bardstown	Nelson	Derby Region	Food	History of American whiskey from Colonial days through the 1960s; located in Spalding Hall along with the Bardstown Historical Museum
Owen County Historical Museum		Owenton	Owen	Northern Kentucky	Local history	website, operated by the Owen County Historical Society
Owensboro Area Museum of Science & History		Owensboro	Daviess	Bluegrass, Blues & Barbecue region	Multiple	website, natural history, science, local history, motor sports, children's area and government
Owensboro Museum of Fine Art		Owensboro	Daviess	Bluegrass, Blues & Barbecue region	Art	website, collection features American, European and Asian fine and decorative arts dating from the 15th century to the present
Paducah Railway Museum		Paducah	McCracken	Western Waterlands	Railroad	website
Paradise Park Museum Complex		Powderly	Muhlenberg	Bluegrass, Blues & Barbecue region	Open-air	Includes Merle Travis birthplace, Coal Mines Shotgun House, a replica of a 1920s coal mining town and a two-room schoolhouse
Parker Warner Historic Museum		Providence	Webster	Bluegrass, Blues & Barbecue region	Local history	website
Pennyroyal Area Museum		Hopkinsville	Christian	Western Waterlands	Local history	website, includes exhibits about Edgar Cayce, area African American history, a pioneer living set, and a military exhibit
Perryville Battlefield State Historic Site		Perryville	Boyle	Bluegrass	Civil War	Site of the Battle of Perryville
Portland Museum		Louisville	Jefferson	Derby Region	Local history	History of Portland, Louisville's riverside community
Railway Museum of Greater Cincinnati		Covington	Kenton	Northern Kentucky	Railroad	Features over 80 historic railroad equipment located on a 4-acre (16,000 m2) site
Red River Museum		Clay City	Powell	Daniel Boone Country	Local history	website, local mining, logging and railroad industries, operated by the Red River Historical Society
River Discovery Center		Paducah	McCracken	Western Waterlands	Maritime	website, river transportation, steamboats, captains, locks and dams, natural history and habitats
Riverside, The Farnsley-Moremen Landing		Louisville	Jefferson	Derby Region	Historic house	1840s house, archaeological excavations, gardens
Riverview at Hobson Grove		Bowling Green	Warren	South Central Kentucky	Historic house	Mid-19th-century home
Rob Morris Home		La Grange	Oldham	Derby Region	Historic house	Home of Rob Morris, the second and last poet laureate of Freemasonry and the founder of the Order of the Eastern Star
Robert Penn Warren Birthplace Museum		Guthrie	Todd	Western Waterlands	Biographical	website, birthplace of poet Robert Penn Warren
Rosemary Clooney Museum		Augusta	Bracken	Northern Kentucky	Biographical	Home of singer Rosemary Clooney
Royal Spring Park		Georgetown	Scott	Bluegrass	Historic house	Park that includes 1874 log cabin
Rowan County Historical Veterans Museum		Morehead	Rowan	Kentucky's Appalachians	Military	website
Samuel May House Living History Museum		Prestonsburg	Floyd	Kentucky's Appalachians	Historic house	Early 19th-century house
Shaker Museum at South Union		Auburn	Logan	South Central Kentucky	Religious	History of the South Union Shaker Village and Shaker folklife and material culture
Shaker Village of Pleasant Hill		Pleasant Hill	Mercer	Bluegrass	Living	19th-century Shaker village
Scott County Arts & Cultural Center		Georgetown	Scott	Bluegrass	Art	Located in the Scott County Jail Complex
Simpson County Archives and Museum		Franklin	Simpson	South Central Kentucky	Local history	website, operated by the Simpson County Historical Society, housed in an old jail and jailer's residence; also known as Old Stone Jail - Simpson County Archives
Sisters of Loretto Heritage Center and Archives		Nerinx	Marion	Central Kentucky	Religious	website, History of the Sisters of Loretto and archives of the congregation.
Sons of the American Revolution		Louisville	Jefferson	Derby Region	Military	Displays on the early history of the United States and the American Revolution in its library
South Central Kentucky Cultural Center		Glasgow	Barren	South Central Kentucky	Local history	website, also known as Museum of the Barrens
Speed Art Museum		Louisville	Jefferson	Derby Region	Art	
Swamp Valley Museum		Frenchburg	Menifee	Daniel Boone Country	Local history	
Swope's Cars of Yesteryear Museum		Elizabethtown	Hardin	Derby Region	Automotive	website, historic automobiles
Thistle Cottage		Greenville	Muhlenberg	Bluegrass, Blues & Barbecue region	Multiple	website, formerly the Duncan Center Museum & Art Gallery, operated by the Muhlenberg County Public Library, art exhibits and area coal history displays
Thomas D. Clark Center for Kentucky History		Frankfort	Franklin	Bluegrass	History	Operated by the Kentucky Historical Society, over 12,000 years of Kentucky history
Thomas Edison House		Louisville	Jefferson	Derby Region	Biographical	
Thomas Merton Center		Louisville	Jefferson	Derby Region	Biographical	Works and memorabilia of Thomas Merton, an American Catholic monk, writer and mystic
Three Forks Historical Center		Beattyville	Lee	Daniel Boone Country	Local history	
University of Kentucky Art Museum		Lexington	Fayette	Bluegrass	Art	European and American artwork ranging from Old Masters to contemporary, and a selection of Non-Western objects
U.S. 23 Country Music Highway Museum		Paintsville	Johnson	Kentucky's Appalachians	Music	Exhibits on the country music entertainers who grew up near U.S. Route 23.
Vent Haven Museum		Fort Mitchell	Kenton	Northern Kentucky	Puppet	Only museum devoted to the art of ventriloquism
Ward Hall		Georgetown	Scott	Bluegrass	Historic house	19th-century Greek Revival mansion
WaterWorks Museum at Louisville Water Tower Park		Louisville	Jefferson	Derby Region	Technology	Restored 19th-century pumping station with steam engines, exhibits about its technology
Waveland State Historic Site		Lexington	Fayette	Bluegrass	Historic house	19th-century plantation home
Wayne County Museum		Monticello	Wayne	Daniel Boone Country	Local history	website, also known as the William Crenshaw Kennedy, Jr. Memorial Museum, operated by the Wayne County Historical Society
Whitehall House & Gardens		Louisville	Jefferson	Derby Region	Historic house	website
White Hall State Historic Site		Richmond	Madison	Bluegrass	Historic house	1860s mansion
Whitney Young Birthplace and Museum		Simpsonville	Shelby	Derby Region	Biographical	Home of civil rights leader Whitney Young, open by request
Wickland		Bardstown	Nelson	Derby Region	Historic house	Early 19th-century house that was home to three state governors, two for Kentucky and one in Louisiana
Wickliffe Mounds		Wickliffe	Ballard	Western Waterlands	Archaeology	
William Clark Market House Museum		Paducah	McCracken	Western Waterlands	Local history	website
William Arnold Log Home		Williamstown	Grant	Northern Kentucky	Historic house	1811 log house, operated by the Grant County Historical Society
William S. Webb Museum of Anthropology		Lexington	Fayette	Bluegrass	Anthropology	website, research collection of the University of Kentucky
William Whitley House State Historic Site		Stanford	Lincoln	Bluegrass	Historic house	Late 18th-century pioneer brick home
Wolfe County Historical Museum		Campton	Wolfe	Daniel Boone Country	Local history	
Woody Winfree Fire-Transportation Museum		Hopkinsville	Christian	Western Waterlands	Transportation	website, includes fire trucks, automobiles, wagons, buggies, a sleigh, license plates and local fire memorabilia
Wrather West Kentucky Museum		Murray	Calloway	Western Waterlands	Local history	website, part of Murray State University, history of West Kentucky and the Jackson Purchase
Yeiser Art Center		Paducah	McCracken	Western Waterlands	Art	website

== Defunct museums ==
- Charles Jackson Circus Museum, Hopkinsville, collections now at the Pennyroyal Area Museum
- Alben W. Barkley Museum, Paducah
- Barren River Imaginative Museum of Science, Bowling Green, closed in 2012
- Floyd Collins Museum, Cave City, closed in 2013
- Morris Toy Museum, Carrsville
- Schmidt Museum of Coca-Cola Memorabilia, Elizabethtown, closed in 2012

== See also ==
- Aquaria in Kentucky (category)
- List of historical societies in Kentucky
- Nature Centers in Kentucky
