= Smocking =

Craft embroidery technique

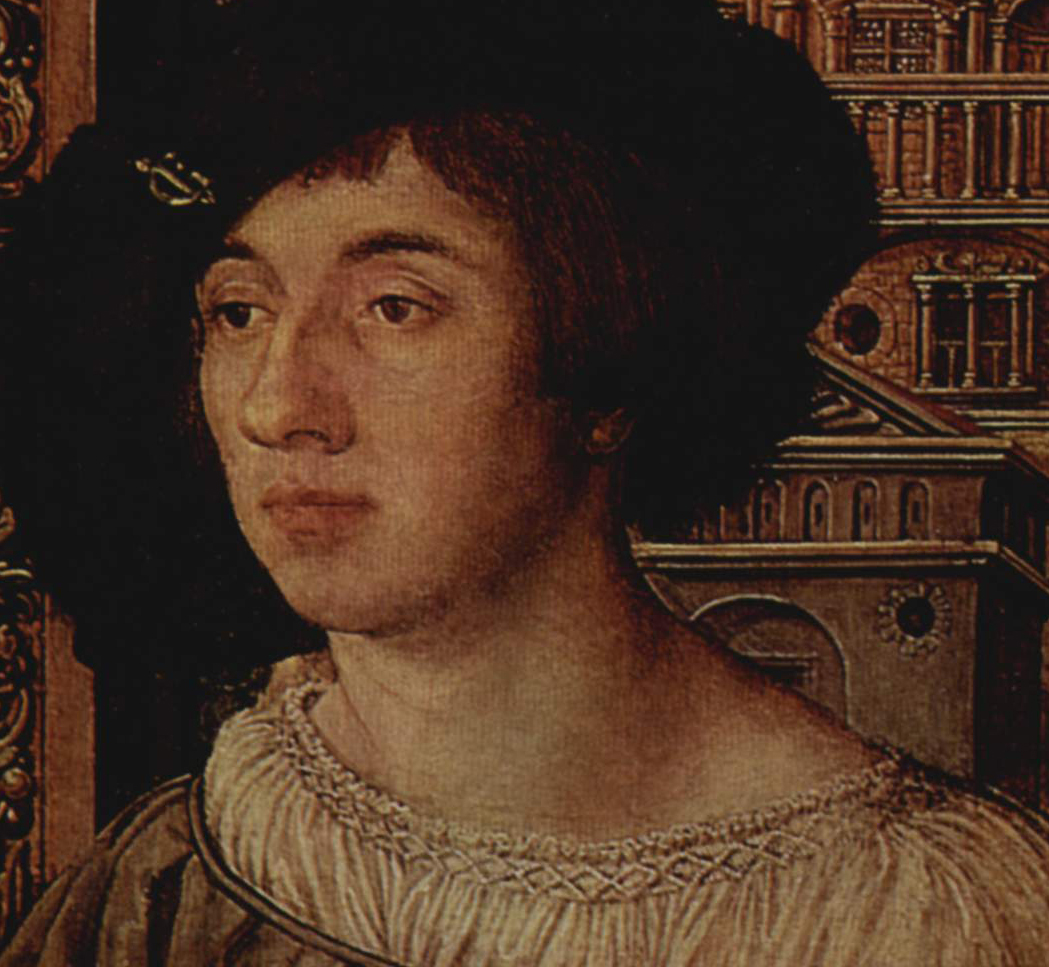
Smocking on the collar of a sixteenth-century garment

Smocking is an embroidery technique used to gather fabric so that it can stretch. Before elastic, smocking was commonly used in cuffs, bodices, and necklines in garments where buttons were undesirable. Smocking developed in England and has been practised since the Middle Ages and is unusual among embroidery methods in that it was often worn by labourers. Other major embroidery styles are purely decorative and represented status symbols. Smocking was practical for garments to be both form fitting and flexible, hence its name derives from smock — an agricultural labourer's work shirt. Smocking was used most extensively in the eighteenth and nineteenth centuries.

== Materials ==
Smocking requires lightweight fabric with a stable weave that gathers well. Cotton and silk are typical fiber choices, often in lawn or voile. Smocking is worked on a crewel embroidery needle in cotton or silk thread and normally requires three times the width of initial material as the finished item will have. Historically, smocking was also worked in piqué, crepe de Chine, and cashmere. According to Good Housekeeping: The Illustrated Book of Needlecrafts, "Any type of fabric can be smocked if it is supple enough to be gathered."

Fabric can be gathered into pleats in a variety of ways.

Early smocking, or gauging, was done by hand. Some embroiderers also made their own guides using cardboard and an embroidery marking pencil. By 1880, iron-on transfer dots were available and advertised in magazines such as Weldon's. The iron-on transfers places evenly spaced dots onto the wrong side of the fabric, which were then pleated using a regular running stitch.

Since the early 1950s, pleating machines have been available to home smockers. Using gears and specialty pleater needles, the fabric is forced through the gears and onto the threaded needles. Pleating machines are typically offered in 16-row, 24-row and 32-row widths.

== Methods ==
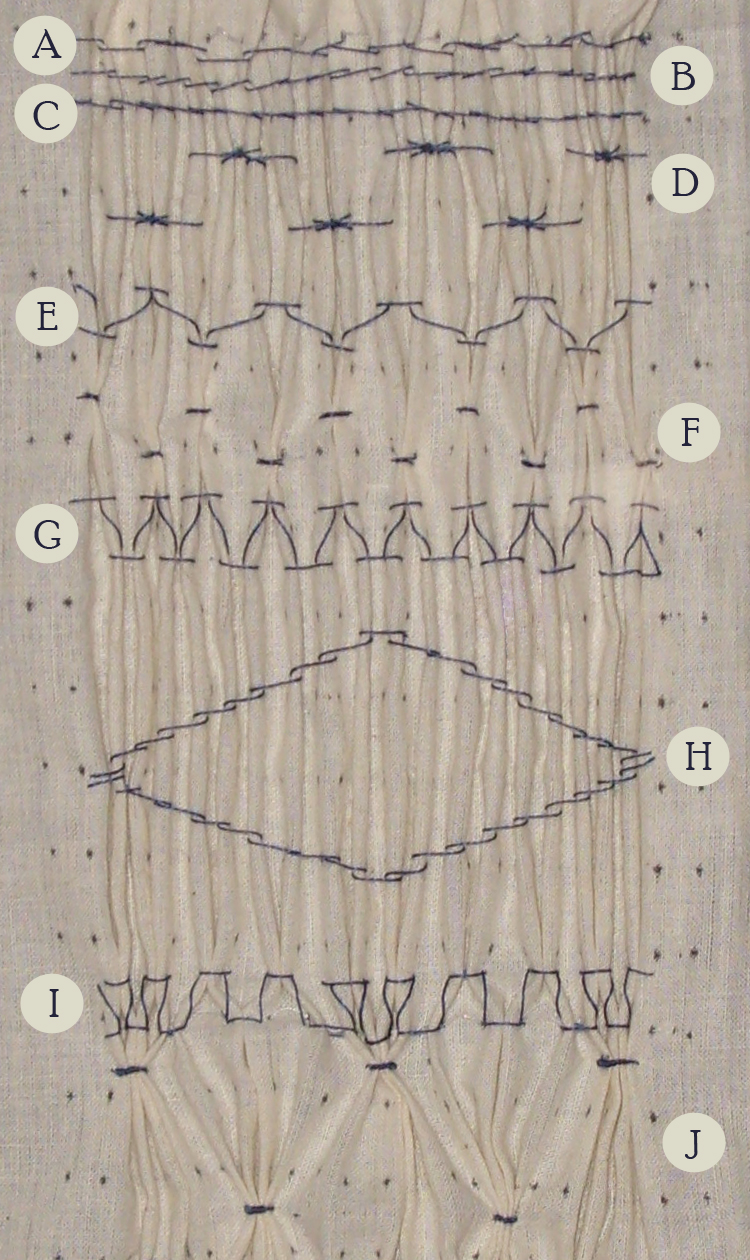
A smocking sampler demonstrating various stitches: A) cable stitch B) stem stitch C) outline stitch D) cable flowerette E) wave stitch F) honeycomb stitch G) surface honeycomb stitch H) trellis stitch I) vandyke stitch J) bullion stitch.

Smocking refers to work done before a garment is assembled. It usually involves reducing the dimensions of a piece of fabric to one-third of its original width, although changes are sometimes lesser with thick fabrics. Individual smocking stitches also vary considerably in tightness, so embroiderers usually work a sampler for practice and reference when they begin to learn smocking.

Traditional hand smocking begins with marking smocking dots in a grid pattern on the wrong side of the fabric and gathering it with temporary running stitches. These stitches are anchored on each end in a manner that facilitates later removal and are analogous to basting stitches. Then a row of cable stitching (see "A") stabilizes the top and bottom of the working area.

While smocking may be done in simple gridded patterns, such as with the cable and stem stitches, smocking is also done in many sophisticated patterns. More complex stitches include variations of the honeycomb stitch, which may be used to make 'flowerettes' in the smocking. These stitches are all most often finished off with a Smocker's Knot technique.

== Organizations ==
Smocking organizations and groups include the Smocking Arts Guild of America (SAGA), the Smocking Arts Guild of NSW, and the Embroiderers' Guild of America. The V and A East Storehouse in London has many examples of smocking that can be viewed upon request.

== See also ==
- Smock-frock
