= Ann Stewart Anderson =

American artist (1935–2019)

Ann Stewart Anderson (March 3, 1935 – March 4, 2019) was an American artist from Louisville, Kentucky whose paintings "focused on the rituals of being a woman." Anderson is known for her part in creating the collective work, the "Hot Flash Fan," a fabric art work about menopause funded by the National Endowment for the Arts. She was the executive director of the Kentucky Foundation for Women.

== Early life and education ==
Ann Stewart Anderson was born in Frankfort, Kentucky. Along with her two sisters, Ann Stewart was a “PK,” a Preacher's Kid, the daughters of Olof Anderson and Martha Ward Jones Anderson. Rev. Anderson led Presbyterian congregations in Lebanon and Richmond, KY., before moving his family to Louisville to head Harvey Browne Memorial Presbyterian Church. She graduated from Wellesley College with a B.A. in History of Art in 1957, and earned a Master in Art (Painting) from The American University in 1961. She attended the Corcoran School of Art and the School of the Art Institute of Chicago.

== Career ==
Anderson worked at the Corcoran Gallery of Art in the late 1950s and taught art in the Montgomery County, Maryland schools before relocating to Chicago. From 1964 to 1975, she was employed by the School of the Art Institute of Chicago, where she quickly rose to become dean of students, a position that tempered her spirit and tested her diplomatic skills as she dealt with students involved in the heady days of the late 1960s, including the protests around the Democratic Convention of 1968. After two unsuccessful attempts at applying for the Mary Elvira Stevens Traveling Fellowship, awarded to Wellesley alumnae, she won the fellowship in 1975, when she was 40. With the Stevens Fellowship, Ann Stewart spent a year in Egypt working on a photographic project, finding scenes of daily life from modern-day Cairo and Egyptian villages (plowing, planting, harvesting; making beer and bread and mud-bricks; plucking ducks; fishing with nets in the river delta) that mirrored those depicted in Pharaonic-era tomb paintings from 3, 000 years ago. After returning to Kentucky in 1975, Anderson served as artist-in-residence at St. Francis High School in Louisville and later as executive director of the Kentucky Foundation for Women. In 1985, she collaborated on an NEA-funded project called Hot Flash Fan with the feminist artist Judy Chicago, a giant multi-media project addressing menopause that included work by over 50 artists. A 60-year retrospective exhibition of her work, "Looking Back/Moving Forward," was mounted at PYRO Art Gallery in Louisville in 2009.

== Death ==
Anderson died on March 4, 2019, one day after her 84th birthday.

== Awards ==
2002: Individual Grant, The Kentucky Foundation for Women, 1998: Professional Development Grant, Kentucky Arts Commission, 1998: Sallie Bingham Award, Kentucky Foundation for Women, 1991: Southern Arts Federation, New Forms Regional Initiative Grant, 1988: Purchase Award, Kentucky Graphics, 1987: Individual Grant, The Kentucky Foundation for Women, 1986: Charles Logan Memorial Prize, Water Tower Art Association, Water Tower Annual, 1985: Robert Cooke Enlow Memorial Purchase Award, Evansville Museum of Art and Science, 1975: Mary Elvira Stevens Traveling Fellowship, Wellesley College,

== Collections ==
Citizens Bank, Glasgow KY; Homequity Wilton, CT; Drake Hotel, Chicago; Turtle Wax Company, Chicago; Brown Foreman Distillers; Atlantic Richfield Corporation; Alabama Power Company; Colwell Financial; Central Bank, Lexington; Hilliard Lyons, Louisville; University of Kentucky Art Museum

== Exhibits ==
1958 13th Area Exhibition, The Corcoran Gallery of Art, Washington DC
1959 14th Area Exhibition, The Corcoran Gallery of Art, Washington DC
1960 Pyramid Gallery, Richmond VA
1960 LaRue Gallery, Washington D.C.
1962 15th Area Exhibition, The Corcoran Gallery of Art, Washington DC
1962 American Art League Show, Smithsonian Institution, Washington DC
1962 La Boheme, Arlington VA
1963 Art Center Gallery, Louisville KY
1966 National Show of Drawings, Mulvane Art Center, Topeka KS
1966 Artists of Kentucky Area, J. B. Speed Art Museum, Louisville KY
1967 National Drawing and Small Sculpture Exhibition, Ball State University, Muncie IN
1973 Montgomery Gallery, Rockville MD
1975 New Horizons, North Show Art League, Chicago IL
1977 Hyatt Regency Exhibition, J.B. Speed Art Museum, Louisville KY
1981 J.B. Speed Art Museum, Louisville KY
1982 Mid America Biennial, Owensboro Fine Arts Museum, Owensboro KY
1983 The Flower, J.B. Speed Art Museum, Louisville KY
1983 Fire I, Art Center Association, Louisville KY
1983 Woman Art, Living Art and Science Center, Lexington KY
1983 Kentucky Art, University of Kentucky Art Museum, Lexington KY
1985 38th Annual Mid-States Art, Evansville Museum of Arts and Science, Evansville IN
1985 Vanities, Swearingen Gallery, Louisville KY
1985 Collaborative Effort "Hot Flash Fan" (with Judy Chicago) Martha White Gallery, Louisville KY
1986 Showcase '86, Water Tower Art Association, Louisville KY
1986 Women's Sensibilities, WARM Gallery, Minneapolis MN
1986 Kentucky Show, J.B. Speed Art Museum, Louisville KY
1986 Todd Capp Gallery, New York NY
1987 Last Hurrah, First Hooray, LOHO Gallery, Louisville KY
1987 State of Mind, traveling show by Kentucky artists
1988 Thanatopsis, Louisville Visual Art Association, Louisville KY
1988 Fanfares, SOHO20 Gallery, New York NY
1988 The Experienced Eye, Owensboro Museum of Fine Arts, Owensboro KY
1988 ME: Artists' Self Portraits, Liberty Gallery, Louisville KY
1988 Mid America Biennial, Owensboro Museum of Fine Arts, Owensboro KY
1988 Kentucky Graphics, Headley-Whitney Museum, Lexington KY
1989 The Human Figure, Atlanta Festival, Atlanta GA
1989 Ladies' Room, McGrath Gallery, Louisville KY
1989 Regional Exhibit, Indianapolis Art League, Indianapolis IN
1989 Two woman exhibit, J.B. Speed Art Museum, Louisville KY
1990 Transformations: Feminist Art by Louisville Artists, Louisville Visual Art Association, Louisville KY
1990 Fanfares, Headley Whitney Museum, Lexington KY
1991 Kingman Gallery, Quito, Ecuador
1991 Collective Contrasts . Zephyr Gallery, Louisville KY
1991 Trumbull Art Gallery, Ohio
1992 Refiguration, Gallery 10, Washington D.C.
1992 Ladies Lunch, Contemporary Art Gallery, New Harmony, IN,
1994 The Shopping Experience, Liberty Gallery, Louisville KY
1994 Wise Woman, Woman Made Gallery, Chicago IL
1994 Red Clay Exhibit, Huntsville Museum of Art, Hunstsville AL
1995 New Paintings, Steinway Gallery, Chapel Hill NC
1995 The Education of the Artist, Capitol Arts Center, Bowling Green KY
1996 What I Ate and When, Art Center of Douglas County, Castle Rock CO
1996 Art Festival, Decatur GA
1996 Woman, the Artists' View, Bennington Center for the Arts, Bennington VT
1997 Original Stories, Louisville Visual Art Association, Louisville KY
1998 New Works: Ann Stewart Anderson and Jeanne Dueber, Capitol Arts Center, Bowling Green KY
1998 Americans: A Satirical Parade, J. B. Speed Art Museum, Louisville KY
1999 Made in Kentucky II, University of Kentucky Art Museum, Lexington KY
2000 The Mythology of Womanhood, Indianapolis Art Center, Indianapolis IN
2000 By Invitation, Belknap Gallery, University of Louisville, Louisville KY
2000 Nature Revisited, Tower Cerlan Gallery, Lexington KY
2001 Inequitable Conditions, Montgomery Gallery, Mt. Sterling KY
2001 Image is Everything: Women and Issues of Beauty, Kentucky Theatre Gallery, Louisville KY
2001 Kentucky Women Artists: 1850–2000, Owensboro Museum of Fine Arts, Owensboro KY
2001 The Box, Images Friedman Gallery, Louisville KY
2001 Breakfastworks, Louisville Visual Art association, Louisville KY
2002 Mythic Women, University of Kentucky Art Museum, Lexington KY
2002 Mythic Women, Actor's Theatre of Louisville, Louisville KY
2002 Water Tower Annual, Louisville Visual Art Association, Louisville KY
2003 Here and There, Brunz-Rosowsky Gallery, Las Vegas, NV
2003 Helen and Clytemnestra, Princeton Theological Seminary, Princeton NJ
2005-6 Mythic Women Juxtaposed, Actors Theatre of Louisville, Louisville KY
2006 IDo! I Do!, Louisville Visual Art Association, Louisville KY
