= Kentucky Foundation for Women =

- Founded: 1985
- Founder: Sallie Bingham
- Type: 501(c)3 Private, Independent Foundation
- Purpose: KFW funds two grant programs, Artist Enrichment and Art Meets Activism, awarding $200,000 in grants annually. They also own and operate Hopscotch House, an artist retreat center.
- Location: Louisville, Kentucky
- Method: Applications for grants in both categories are reviewed by panels of independent grant reviewers. Each grant review panel consists of three reviewers, two from Kentucky and one from out-of-state, who are all highly qualified artists and activists from a range of disciplines.
- Key people: Judith Jennings, Ph.D., Executive Director; Sherry Hurley, Hopscotch House Program Director; Rae Strobel, Grant Program Administrator; Sue Massek, Administrative Assistant; Katie Anderson, Hopscotch House Property Manager

The Kentucky Foundation for Women promotes feminist art and social justice by awarding grants to individual artists and organizations, providing time and space for artists and activists at its retreat center, sharing information, and building alliances.

The Kentucky Foundation for Women is a 501(c)3 private, independent foundation that was established in 1985 by author Sallie Bingham of Louisville, Kentucky. At the time, Ms. Bingham's philanthropic gift of $10 million was the largest endowment to any women's fund in the United States. The mission of the Kentucky Foundation for Women is "to promote positive social change by supporting varied feminist expression in the arts."

The foundation funds two grant programs annually, they are Artist Enrichment and Arts Meets Activism. Both grant programs are artist-centered, feminist in nature, and demonstrate high artistic quality. Applicants to both programs are expected to be able to express their commitment to feminism and their understanding of the relationship between art and social change.

Grant awards range from $1,000 to $7,500 per project. Social change, as defined by the foundation, includes "eliminating societal barriers to women: neutralizing discrimination against women based on age, ethnicity, sexual orientation, physical ability, economic condition, and geographic origin; and producing actions, conditions, policies, attitudes, and behaviors that benefit women."

Between 1985 and 2005 the Kentucky Foundation for Women awarded 1298 grants to individuals and organizations totaling $7,140,831.

Hopscotch House is a program of the Kentucky Foundation for Women; it is first and foremost an artist retreat center for feminist artists. It is also used by a variety of groups and organizations that are working to better the lives of women and girls in Kentucky.

Hopscotch House was purchased by the Kentucky Foundation for Women in 1987 and was first used by a group of women writers known as the Wolf Pen Writer's Colony. In the early 1990s Hopscotch House became available to other women artists and women's groups. Over the years, Hopscotch House has served hundreds of women including artists, activists, feminists, eco-feminists, art critique groups, drumming circles, quilting groups, social justice groups, girls' empowerment groups, arts organizations, and social service organizations.

The property is considered a "classic" Kentucky farmstead and is located 13 miles east of downtown Louisville. The house has five bedrooms, six bathrooms, a library of women's literature and reference works, a large living room/dining area, a sun room, and a deck. The large kitchen is fully furnished and well equipped so that residents can prepare their own meals. Separate studio space for artists is available upon request.

== Other activities and support ==
The Kentucky Foundation for Women has provided financial gifts for special projects such as the National Sculpture Conference: Works by Women held in Cincinnati, Ohio in 1987. The conference honored American women sculptors ages 67–88. The honorees were: Selma Burke, Elizabeth Catlett, Clyde Connell, Dorothy Dehner, Louise Bourgeois, Claire Falkenstein, Sue Fuller, Louise Nevelson and Claire Zeisler.

The Hot Flash Fan, purchased by the foundation, was a collaborative project completed by more than 50 artists. "The project is a fan incorporating needlework, knotting, quilting, and painting in an expression of feelings associated with menopause." Lead artists for the project were: Judy Chicago, facilitator; Ann Stewart Anderson, originator and principal coordinating artist; Ada O'Connor, principal embroidery artist/coordinator; Judith Myers, quilting coordinator. The Hot Flash Fan was on display at the Water Tower, home of the Louisville Visual Art Association, before being added to the Foundation's permanent collection.

The Kentucky Foundation for Women published 50 issues of the literary journal The American Voice, which featured international and Kentucky writers. The editor of the Pan-American journal was Frederick Smock and was published trianually from 1986 to 1999. During that time The American Voice published two stories that were awarded the Pushcart Prize that honors the best poetry, short fiction, and essays published in the small presses. It was a feminist publication that was known for featuring works by well-known authors such as Joyce Carol Oates, Isabel Allende, and Reynolds Price alongside Kentuckians Wendell Berry, James Still, and Sena Jeter Naslund. The journal also nurtured the work of less established, home-grown talent and published early work by the award-winning poet Aleda Shirley, novelist Barbara Kingsolver, playwright Naomi Wallace, and children's author George Ella Lyon.

=== Sallie Bingham Award ===
The Sallie Bingham Award was established in 1996 to recognize individuals and groups who have made outstanding contributions toward changing the lives of Kentucky women through feminist expression in the arts. Recipients are given a $500 cash award, a gold-plated Ginko pin and plaque. The award is announced at KFW Day, an annual celebration held each fall at Hopscotch House.

Past recipients

- Mary Jefferson, author
- Alma Lesch, textile artist
- Ann Stewart Anderson, visual artist
- Laverne Zabielski, author
- Nana Yaa Asantewaa, storyteller
- Pat Buster, poet and longtime KFW staff member
- Lorna Littleway, theatre artist
- Kentucky Feminist Writers Series, Elizabeth Oakes and Jane Olmsted, editors
- Kentucky Women Writers Conference
- Judy Sizemore, poet
- Carridder Jones, author
- Gail Burrus Martin, activist and KFW board member

== See also ==
- National Museum of Women in the Arts
