= Jacob Hiestand House =

- U.S. National Register of Historic Places
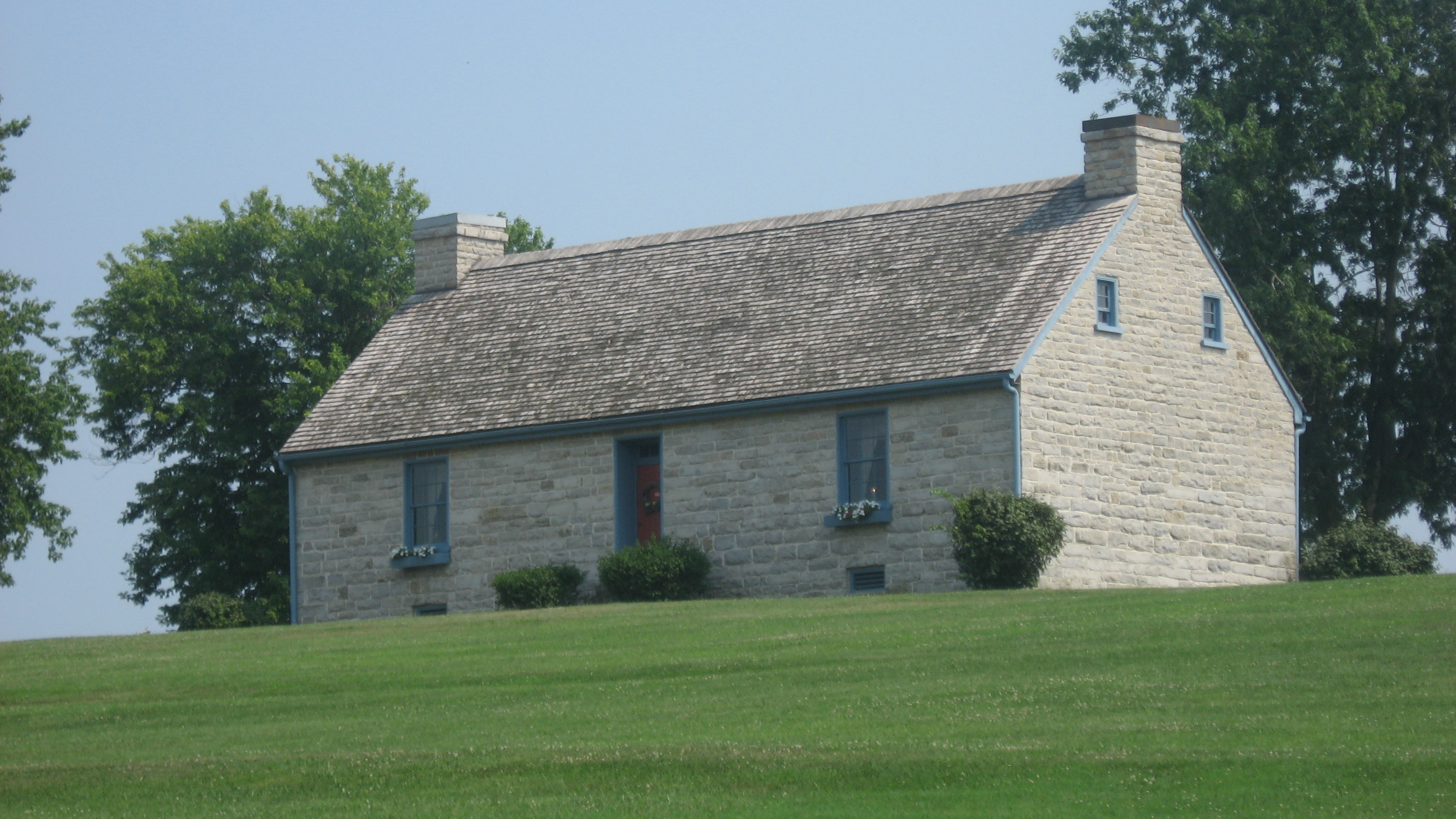

- Location within Kentucky
- Location: West of Campbellsville, Kentucky off Kentucky Route 210
- Coordinates: 37.3497°N 85.3753°W
- Area: less than one acre
- Built: 1823-25
- NRHP reference No.: 83002877
- Added to NRHP: February 10, 1983

The Jacob Hiestand House, in Taylor County, Kentucky west of Campbellsville, Kentucky, was built from 1823 to 1825. It is one of 12 German stone houses surviving in the state, It was listed on the National Register of Historic Places in 1983.

The house is a one-story, three-bay central hall plan house built of coursed limestone. Construction was by "the dry construction method of clay sealed with lime mortar." It is about 24 by 52 feet (7.3 m × 15.8 m) in plan, with a cellar; each of its two rooms, on either side of its hall, has an arched stone fireplace.

It was home of Jacob Hiestand, who was born in York County, Pennsylvania, who moved to Kentucky around 1816 and built this house in 1823. A daughter, Araminta, and her husband Joseph H. Chandler, an attorney and state senator, were living in the house when it was hit by Morgan's Raid, the rambling 1000-mile long 1863 Civil War raid of Confederate General John Hunt Morgan into Indiana, Kentucky, Ohio and West Virginia.

The property included a separated 12 by 14 feet (3.7 m × 4.3 m) stone kitchen, a stone springhouse, a dug well, and a .25 acres (0.10 ha) cemetery.

Development of a shopping plaza in the area in 1988, threatened the house; the house and its cemetery were both moved about .5 miles (0.80 km) to their present locations. The house is now a museum, the Hiestand House-Taylor County Museum.
