= Magoffin County Pioneer Village and Museum =

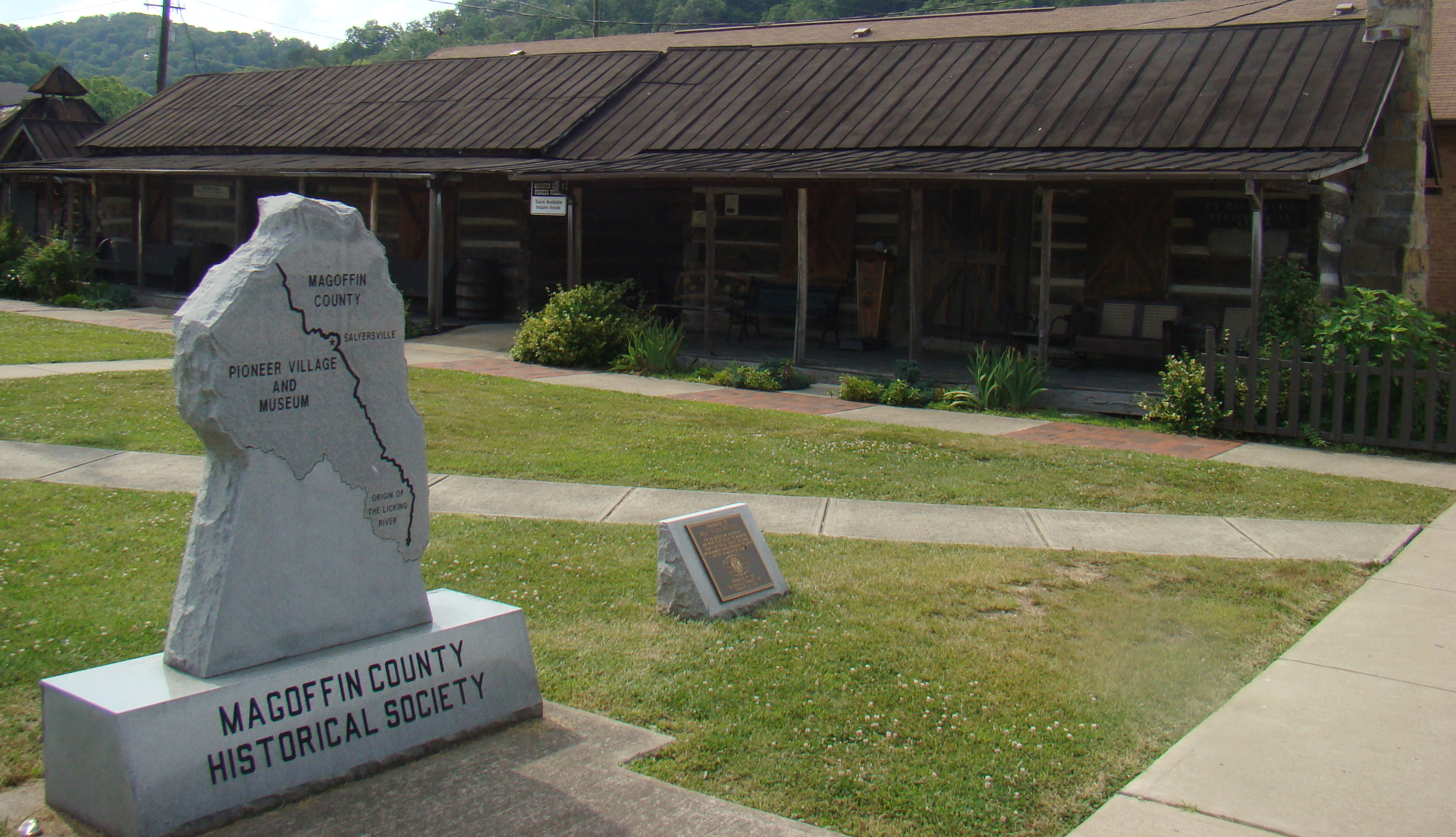

- Location within Kentucky
- Location: 239 South Church Street, Salyersville, Kentucky
- Coordinates: 37.75035°N 83.06804°W
- Type: Open-air museum
- Director: Todd Preston
- Website: Museum website

Magoffin County Pioneer Village and Museum is museum in downtown Salyersville, Kentucky that exhibits a collection of reconstructed log buildings from, mostly, the eastern region of Kentucky. The Magoffin County Historical Society maintains a Library and Archives Center with a collection of genealogical and historical material at the site.

Most of the cabins displayed in the reconstructed village date back to the early 19th century. The structures use all original materials from the log buildings. The buildings are disassembled and then transported to the Pioneer Village for reassembly on site.

== Gallery ==
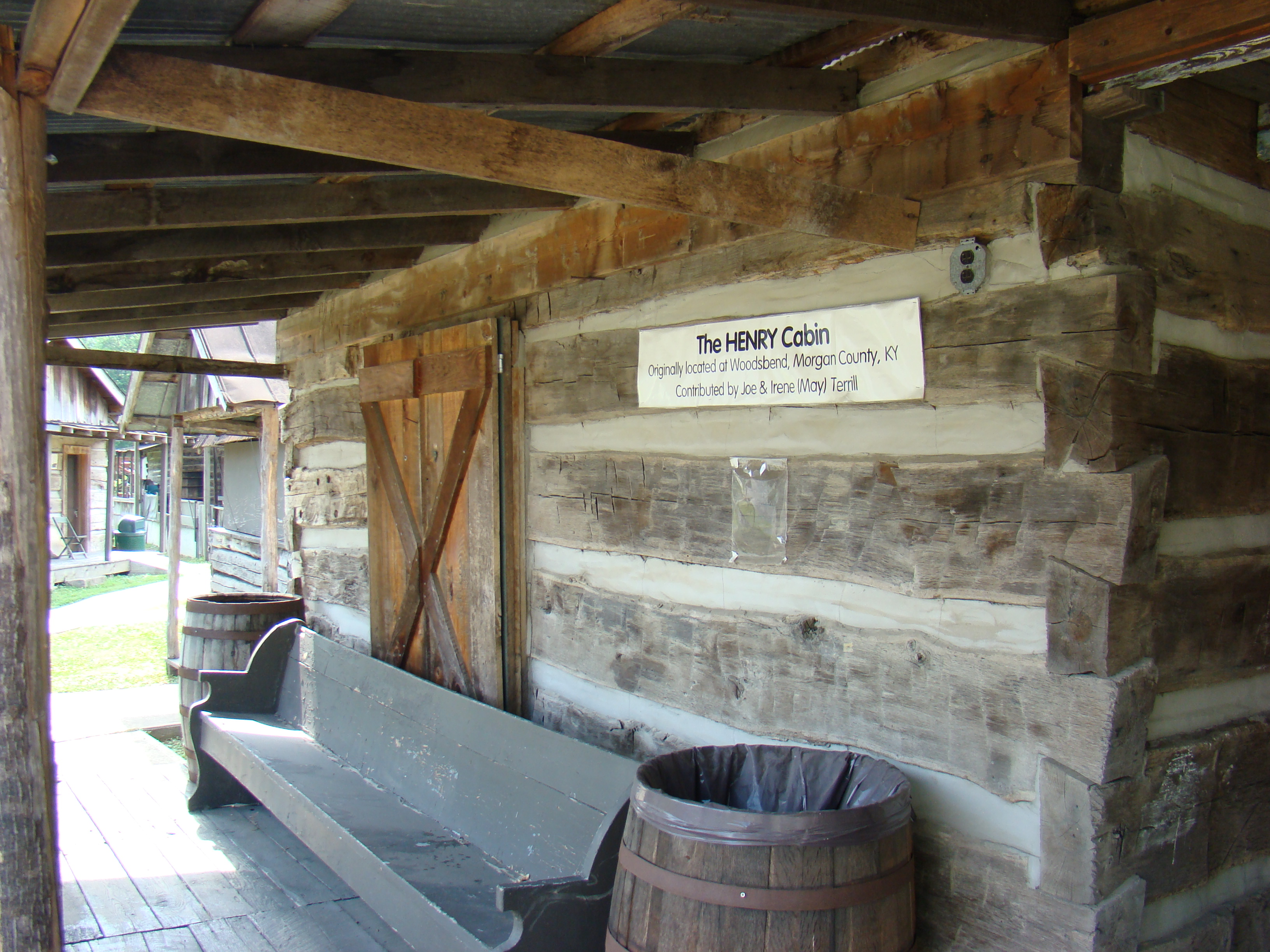
The Henry Cabin was originally located in Woodsbend, in Morgan County, Kentucky

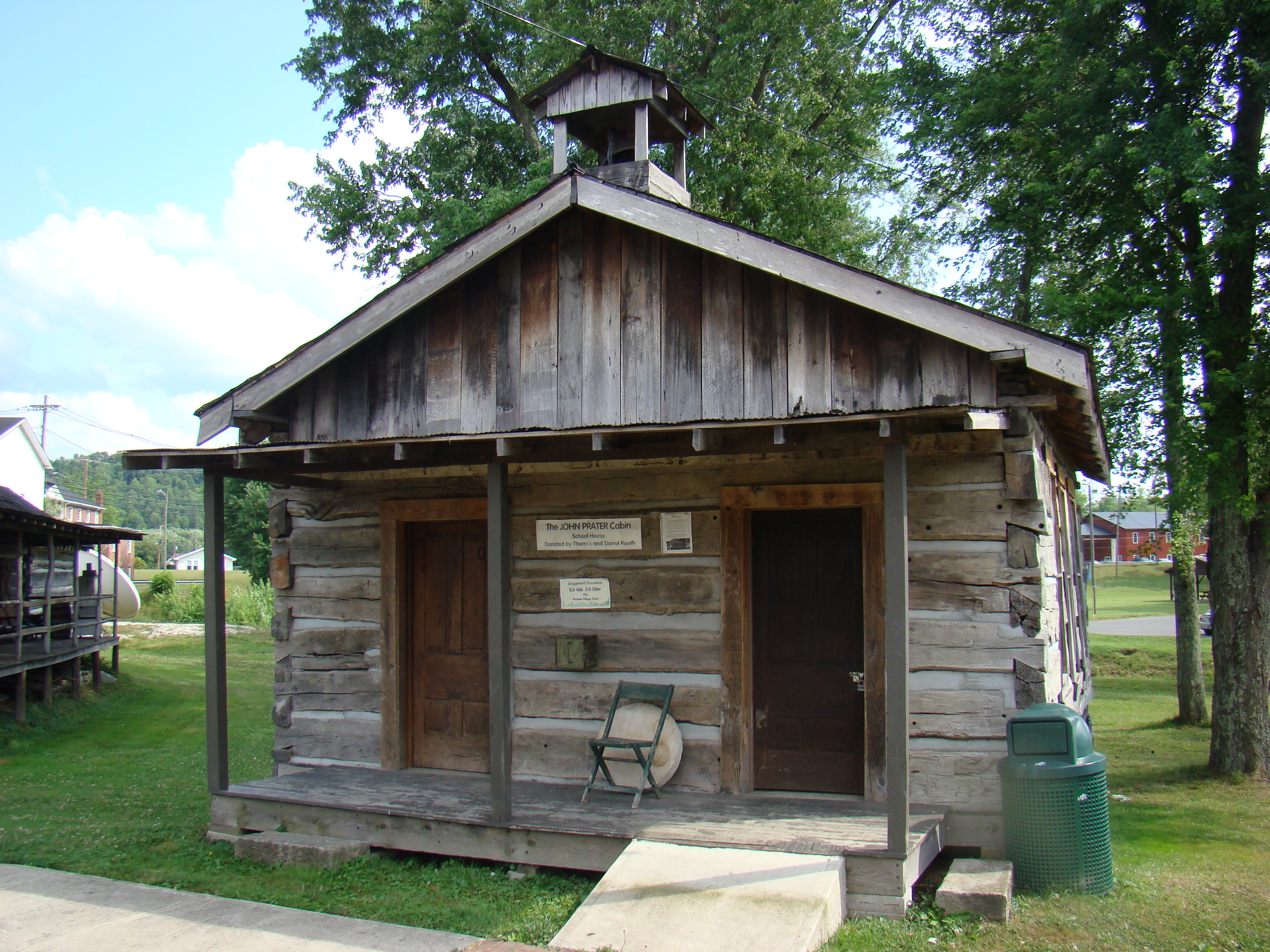
The John Prater Cabin is a log school house

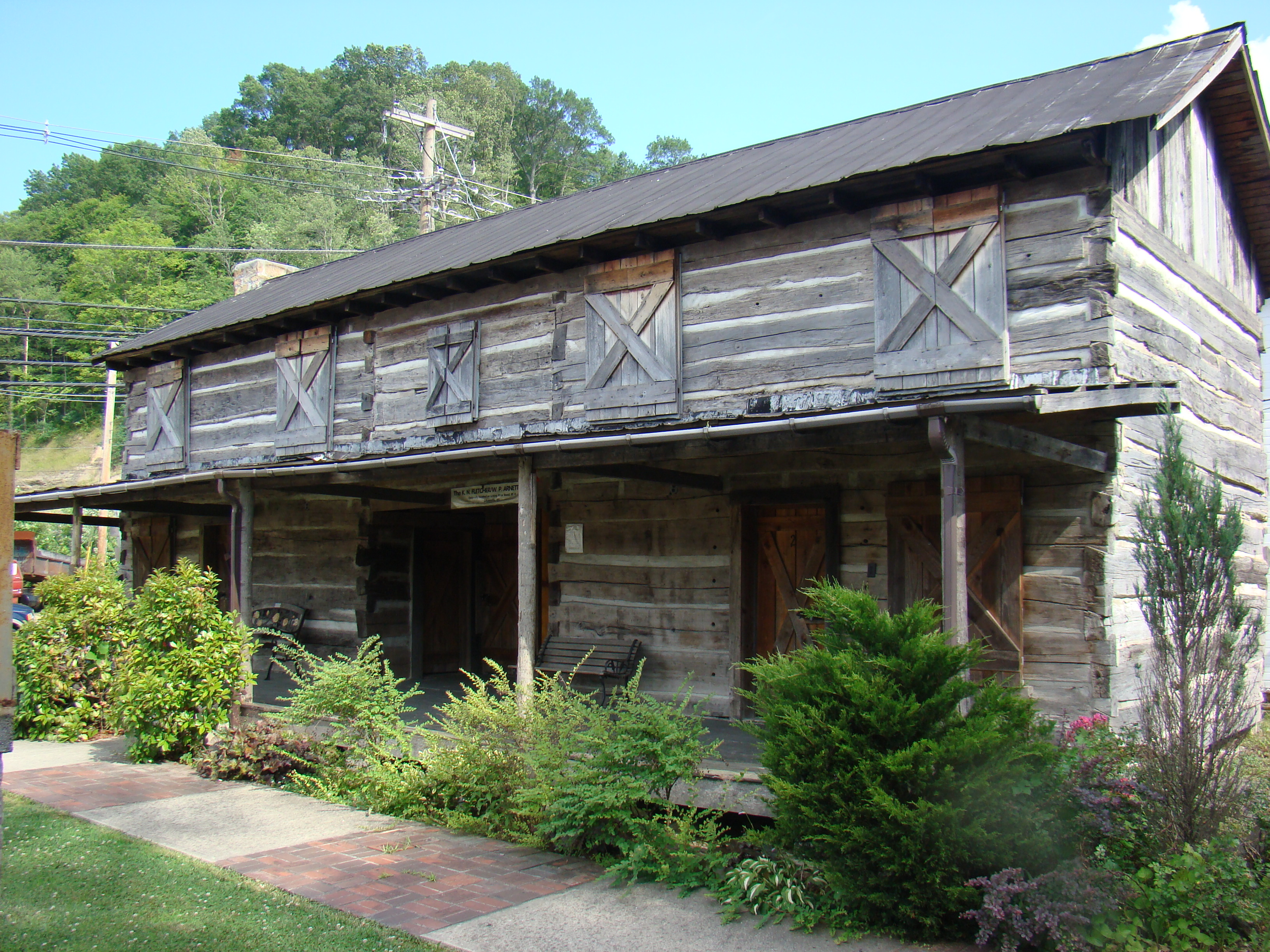
The Fletcher-Arnett Cabin is a two-story, two-pen log cabin built by Kelsey N. Fletcher and originally located near Lakeville in Magoffin County
