= Barlow House Museum =

Museum

Coordinates: 37.0514°N 89.0455°W

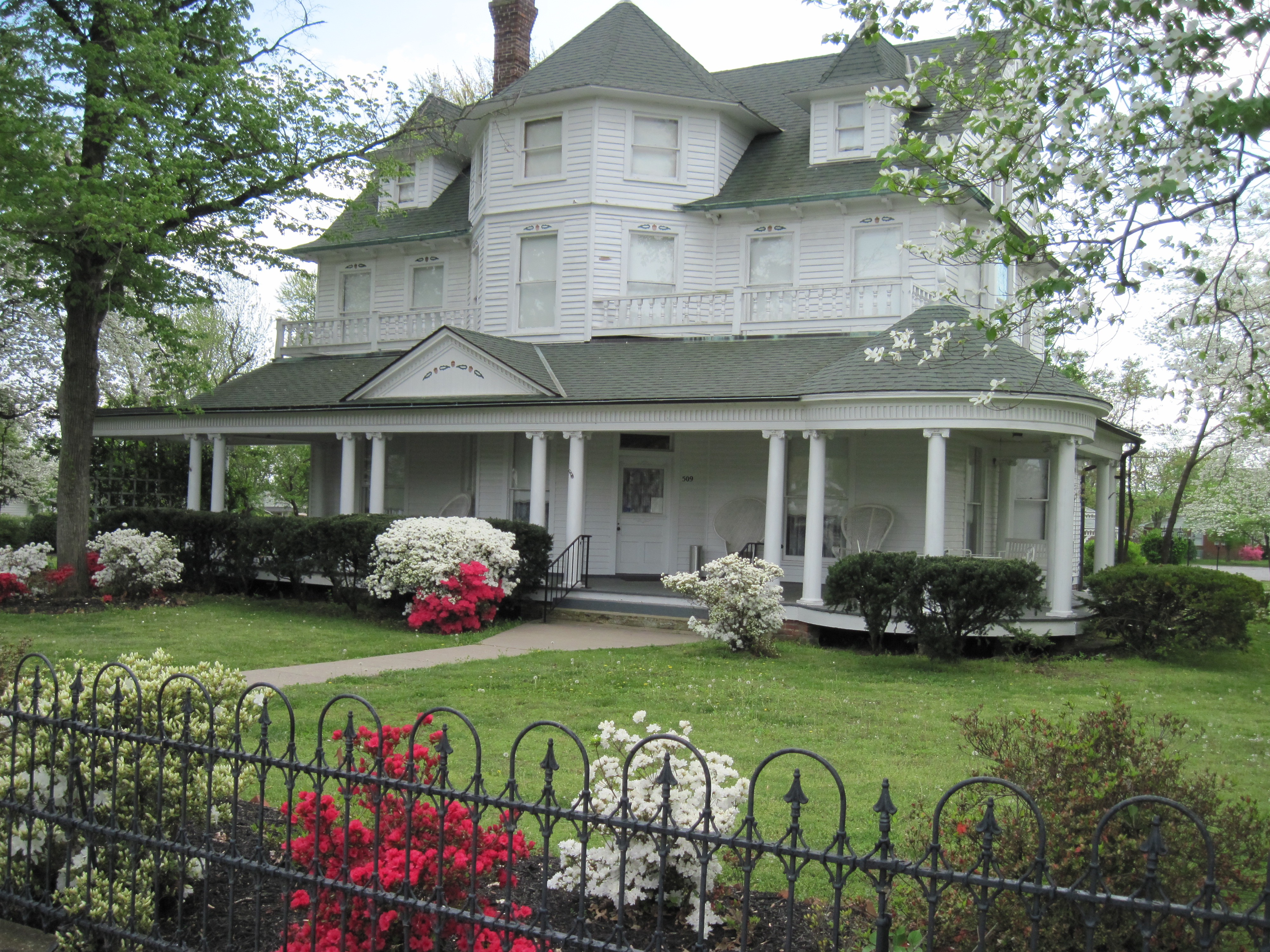
The Barlow House Museum in Barlow, Kentucky

The Barlow House Museum is a nationally registered historic house located in Barlow, Kentucky near the confluence of the Mississippi and Ohio Rivers.

== History ==
Thomas Jefferson Barlow and his wife left Georgetown, KY in the spring of 1849 to settle in the “wilderness” of Ballard County. Barlow purchased 400 acres for $4/acre in territory later incorporated as the town of Barlow. Near the railroad depot he built a log cabin and there on November 18, 1849, his son Clifton Jesse Barlow was born. Later employed as a tariff collector on the Mississippi river Clifton Barlow married Carrie Mae Miller and in 1903 built the Victorian home that now houses the Barlow Family Museum. They went on to raise their six children here, Vivian, Victor, Ruby, Conway, Norma, and Thomas.

The house passed to the eldest son Vivian, who used it as a summer residence while residing in Connecticut teaching piano at the Choate Rosemary Hall. Vivian Barlow spent his summers traveling the world collecting the memorabilia and artifacts that comprise the museum's collection.

The house was listed in the National Register of Historic Places in 1991. Vivian Barlow left the house in his will to the US Bank Foundation, to be administered as a public benefit for the people of Ballard County.

The house is currently administered as a museum, with public visiting hours.
