= University of Kentucky Art Museum =

Coordinates: 38.037614°N 84.501171°W

- Established: 1976
- Location: 405 Rose St, Lexington, Kentucky
- Type: Art museum
- Curator: Janie M. Welker
- Website: finearts.uky.edu/art-museum

The University of Kentucky Art Museum is an art museum in Lexington, Kentucky, located in the Singletary Center for the Arts building. The collection includes European and American artwork ranging from Old Masters to contemporary, as well as a selection of Non-Western objects. Featured artists include Alexander Calder, Agostino Carracci, Jean Dubuffet, Julien Dupré, Sam Gilliam, Edward Melcarth, Louise Nevelson, and Gilbert Stuart, among others.

The Art Museum is located on the University of Kentucky campus in the Singletary Center for the Arts, Rose Street and Euclid Avenue.

== See also ==
- List of museums in Kentucky
