= Embroiderers' Guild of America =

Needlework organization

- Formation: 1970
- Founded at: New York City
- Tax ID no.: 131914577

The Embroiderers' Guild of America, headquartered in Louisville, Kentucky, is an organization dedicated to "fostering the art of needlework and associated arts." Its members practice any and all forms of needlework, and are dedicated to education and community outreach. EGA has chapters throughout the United States. Chapters are organized into regions. Events are organized at all levels of the organization.

Membership in EGA is open to anyone interested in embroidery from the beginner to the professional. Members work within local chapters or a member-at-large network to improve their skills and knowledge. Also, the organization and individual members are involved with museums for education and preservation purposes. EGA offers individual and group correspondence courses, teacher and judge certification programs as well as master craftsman programs.

The Guild's definition of embroidery is intentionally un-confining: anything made "using a needle with an eye in it". In 2020 the national guild has over 8,800 national and international members organized in 260 local chapters in 13 regions, as well as 3 online chapters.

== History ==
=== 1957: needlework class ===
Three women, Dorothy (Mrs. F. Huntington) Babcock (formerly Dorothy Doubleday), Margaret (Mrs. Daryl) Parshall, and Miss Sally Behr (later Pettit) form a needlework class in Mrs. Babcock's New York City apartment. The following year this group launched the American Branch, Embroiderers' Guild of London.

The Guild was created in 1958, in New York City, as a branch of Embroiderers' Guild of London. In 1970 the Guild withdrew from the London Guild and established The Embroiderers' Guild of America.

The organization's head office in Louisville includes a gallery for displays from its permanent collection and changing exhibits of embroidery.
