= Kentucky Women Remembered =

Kentucky Women Remembered is an exhibit in the Kentucky State Capitol that honors the contributions of women from the Commonwealth. The exhibit consists of over 60 watercolor portraits of outstanding Kentucky women. The Kentucky Commission on Women receives nominations and selects two to four honorees each year to be included. The exhibit includes famous Kentucky musicians Loretta Lynn and Rosemary Clooney as well as civic leaders Mae Street Kidd and Georgia Davis Powers.

Governor Edward T. Breathitt established a commission on the status of Kentucky women in April 1964. The commission determined that Kentucky women's status would be improved through a permanent agency and Governor Louie Nunn signed an executive order establishing the Kentucky Commission on Women in November 1968. Legislative action made the Commission official in 1970. In 1978, the Kentucky Commission on Women started a campaign to recognize Kentucky women that history had overlooked. The exhibit "Kentucky Women Excel" began at that year's Kentucky State Fair. In 1996 the exhibit was moved to a first floor hallway of the west wing of the Capitol building. The first 17 portraits were created by artist Paula Jull. Other portrait artists that have created works for the exhibit include Alison Davis Lyne and Mary Lou Hall.

The Kentucky Women Remembered Committee accepts nominations for new honorees. Nominees may be living or deceased and must have been born in Kentucky or spent a significant part of their lives living in the state. Candidates are required to be role models, to have strengthened Kentucky or the United States through their work, and to have shown leadership in elevating the status of women. New portraits are typically unveiled at a ceremony that takes place during Women's History Month in March.

== Honorees ==
Kentucky Women Remembered
Name	Image	Birth–Death	Year honored	Area of achievement
Lilialyce Akers		(1927–2008)	2005	Lilialyce Akers was a Kentucky educator and prominent advocate for women who taught women's studies and sociology at the University of Louisville. She encouraged her students to support the Kentucky Equal Rights Amendment and bussed an entire class to the 1977 National Women's Conference in Houston. Akers left $500,000 of her estate to the UofL to create the Lilialyce Akers Scholarship Fund.
Sophia Alcorn		(1883–1967)	1996	Sophia Alcorn was a Kentucky educator who invented the Tadoma method of communicating with deafblind students. She developed the technique while teaching at the Kentucky School for the Deaf in Danville. She was also the first woman elder in the Stanford Presbyterian Church.
Lonnie Ali		(1950s–)	2023	Wife of Muhammad Ali and advocate for Parkinson's research.
Mary Willie Arvin		(1879–1947)	2006	Mary Arvin is Kentucky's most highly decorated female veteran of World War I. A general practice nurse, she received the British Royal Red Cross, the French Croix de Guerre and a Purple Heart.
Hannah Hume Baird		(1939–2004)	2004	Hannah Hume Baird was a community activist and advocate for women. She was a member of President Carter's National Advisory Council on Economic Opportunity and chaired the Kentucky Women's Political Caucus as well as the Kentucky Commission on Women. She also helped to restore the Dinsmore Homestead.
Nelda Lambert Barton-Collings		(1929–2014)	2007	Nelda Lambert Barton-Collings was a community leader and licensed nursing home administrator. She had been a delegate to the Republican National Committee and was appointed to the Federal Council on Aging.
Jane Beshear		(1946–)	2023	Former First Lady of Kentucky, breast cancer awareness activist.
Anne Braden		(1924–2006)		Anne Braden was a civil rights activist, organizer and writer who advocated for racial equality, school desegregation, social justice, fair housing and LGBT rights. She received national media attention in 1954 when she and her husband bought a house for an African American couple in an all-white neighborhood close to Shively.
Carolyn Bratt		(1943–)	2004	Carolyn Bratt is a Kentucky attorney and professor at the University of Kentucky College of Law. She was the first chair of the University of Kentucky President's Commission on Women and helped to found the Women's Studies Program at the University of Kentucky.
Madeline McDowell Breckinridge		(1872–1920)	1996	Madeline McDowell Breckinridge was a leader of the women's suffrage movement and one of Kentucky's leading Progressive reformers. She was president of the Kentucky Equal Rights Association and vice president of the National American Woman Suffrage Association.
Mary Carson Breckinridge		(1881–1965)	1996	Mary Carson Breckinridge was an American nurse-midwife who founded the Frontier Nursing Service to provide care for mothers and infants in Kentucky's eastern counties. A deeply religious woman, Breckinridge was a pioneer of home health care and started a midwifery school.
Sally Shallenberger Brown		(1911–2011)	2008	The granddaughter of Ashton C. Shallenberger, Sally Brown was a conservationist and the namesake of the Crutcher and Sally Brown Nature Preserves in the Kentucky River Palisades. A longtime champion of environmental protection, she advocated for the Kyoto Protocol and the Arctic National Wildlife Refuge in Alaska.
Willa Beatrice Brown		(1906–1992)	2012	Willa Brown was an aviator and educator. She was the first African American woman licensed to fly in the United States.
Claire Louise Caudill		(1912–1998)	1999	Claire Louise Caudill was a country doctor from Rowan County who delivered 8000 babies and founded a hospital during her five-decade career.
Anna Mac Clarke		(1919–1944)		Anna Mac Clarke was a member of the Women's Army Corps during World War II. She was the first African American women to be a commanding officer of an otherwise all-white regiment, breaking gender and racial barriers at a time when the United States military was still segregated.
Laura Clay		(1849–1941)	1996	Laura Clay was a leader of the American women's suffrage movement and the co-founder and first president of the Kentucky Equal Rights Association. She was active in the Democratic Party, a powerful orator and had important leadership roles in local, state and national politics, and in 1920 at the Democratic National Convention was the first woman to be nominated for the presidency by a major political party.
Rosemary Clooney		(1928–2002)	2003	Rosemary Clooney was a singer and actress. She came to prominence in the early 1950s with the novelty hit "Come On-a My House", which was followed by other pop numbers such as "Botch-a-Me", "Mambo Italiano", "Tenderly", "Half as Much", "Hey There" and "This Ole House". She also had success as a jazz vocalist and continued recording until her death in 2002. She is the aunt of actor George Clooney.
Martha Layne Collins		(1936–2025)		Martha Layne Collins is a former businesswoman and politician who was Kentucky's 56th Governor from 1983 to 1987. Prior to her election as Governor, she was the 48th Lieutenant Governor of Kentucky, under John Y. Brown, Jr. Her election made her the highest-ranking Democratic woman in the U.S. The state experienced record economic growth under Collins' leadership. She taught at several universities after her governorship and from 1990 to 1996, she was the president of Saint Catharine College near Springfield.
Jane Todd Crawford		(1763–1842)	1996	Jane Todd Crawford was the first woman to undergo an oophorectomy. Physician Ephraim McDowell performed the surgery.
Emma Guy Cromwell		(1869–1952)	1996	Emma Guy Cromwell was a suffragist, women's rights activist, and early female Democratic Party politician. Cromwell became the first woman to hold a statewide office in Kentucky when she was elected state librarian in 1896 by a vote of the Kentucky State Senate. In 1923, Cromwell was elected Secretary of State of Kentucky in an election against two other women. She went on to be elected Kentucky State Treasurer in 1927, and because of her conservative handling of state money, which was heavily criticized at the time, Kentucky's state funds remained secure during the Great Depression.
Sharon Currens			2023	First executive director of the Kentucky Coalition Against Domestic Violence (now ZeroV).
Dolores Delahanty		(1929–)	2002	Dolores Delahanty is a social activist and political leader in Louisville, Kentucky. She was a founding member of the National Women's Political Caucus during the early Civil Rights Movement, and she was critical to the success of Kentucky's Fair Credit Law. Delahanty has devoted her life to improving the lives of others, primarily those of Kentucky women and children.
Hannah Drake			2023	Activist, author, podcast host and poet.
Alice Allison Dunnigan		(1906–1983)	2007	Alice Allison Dunnigan was an African-American journalist, civil rights activist and author. She was the first African-American female correspondent to receive White House credentials, and the first black female member of the Senate and House of Representatives press galleries.
Mary Elliott Flanery		(1867–1933)	2005	Mary Elliott Flanery was a progressive era social reformer, suffragist, politician, and journalist who is best remembered as the first women elected to the Kentucky General Assembly and first women elected to a state legislature south of the Mason–Dixon line. She was an advocate for equal rights for women, and actively worked to pass legislation that would give women the right to vote.
Lois Howard Gray		(1920–2012)	2013	Lois Howard Gray was a Kentucky physician. She founded the Rural Kentucky Medical Scholarship Fund. She was a WAVES officer in the Navy during World War II.
Mary (Cissy) Peterson Gregg		(1903–1966)	1996	Mary Gregg was a Kentucky cookbook author and daily food columnist for the Courier-Journal. She encouraged the inclusion of more green vegetables in the American diet and argued that it should include less potatoes, meat, and bread.
Eula Hall		(1927–2021)	1999	Eula Hall is a prominent Appalachian activist and healthcare pioneer who founded Grethel's Mud Creek Clinic in Floyd County, Kentucky. During President Johnson's War on Poverty she joined the VISTA (Volunteers in Service to America) program and later became one of two local Appalachian Volunteers working in the area.
Josephine Henry		(1843–1928)	1999	Josephine Kirby Henry was a progressive era women's rights leader, suffragist, social reformer, and writer from Versailles, Kentucky. She was a strong advocate for women and a leading proponent of legislation that would grant married women property rights. Henry lobbied hard for the adoption of the Kentucky 1894 Married Woman's Property Act, and is credited for being instrumental in its passage. Henry was the first woman to campaign publicly for a statewide office in Kentucky.
Allie Hixson		(1924–2007)		Allie Corbin Hixson was a women's rights activist and important leader in the effort to secure an Equal Rights Amendment for the United States Constitution. She is presumed to have been the first woman to earn a doctorate in English from the University of Louisville.
Julia Britton Hooks		(1852–1942)	1996	Julia Britton Hooks was a musician, educator, and leader for African-American women. She was a charter member of the Memphis branch of the National Association for the Advancement of Colored People (NAACP), and her example served as an inspiration for her grandson, Benjamin Hooks, executive director of the NAACP from 1977 to 1992.
Nelle Pitcock Horlander		(1929–2008)	2009	Nelle P. Horlander was a labor leader and advocate for women. She started her career as an operator for Southern Bell and was a longtime member of the Communications Workers of America.
Marie Caldwell Humphries		(1919–2017)	2014	First chair of the Kentucky Commission on Women
Louise Gilman Hutchins		(1911–1996)	2004	Born to missionaries in China, Louise Gilman Hutchins was a physician who devoted herself to maternal and child health in Kentucky. She was a pediatrician in Berea and was the medical director of Berea's Mountain Maternal Health League for five decades.
Margaret Ingels		(1892–1971)	1996	Margaret Ingels was an engineer and air conditioning specialist. In 1916 she became the first woman to earn a mechanical engineering degree from the University of Kentucky and the second woman engineering graduate in the United States.
Grace Marilynn James		(1923–1989)	2010	Grace Marilynn James was a Louisville physician who was committed to the African American community. A pediatrician, she was the first African American woman on the Louisville Children's Hospital staff.
Alberta Odell Jones		(1930–1965)	2024	Attorney and civil rights activist.
Mae Street Kidd		(1904–1999)	1997	Mae Street Kidd was a businesswoman, civic leader, and politician. She served in the Red Cross during World War II, and was a member of the Kentucky House of Representatives from 1968 to 1984. She sponsored a bill in 1972, later known as the Mae Street Kidd Act, which created the Kentucky Housing Corporation (KHC). She also led the campaign for Kentucky to ratify the United States Constitution's 13th (abolishing slavery), 14th (defining citizenship) and 15th (granting all men the right to vote regardless of race, color, or previous condition of servitude) Amendments.
Katherine G. Langley		(1888–1948)	2006	Katherine Gudger Langley was the first woman elected to Congress from Kentucky. She was member of United States House of Representatives during the Seventieth and Seventy-first sessions of Congress. She was the wife of John W. Langley and daughter of James M. Gudger, Jr.
Ada Limón		(1976–)	2024	United States Poet Laureate.
Lucille Caudill Little		(1909–2002)	2002	Lucille Caudill Little was a patron of the arts and philanthropist who served as president of the W. Paul and Lucille Caudill Little Foundation in Lexington. She gave more than $21 million to arts and education causes.
Crit Luallen		(1952–)	2012	Crit Luallen is a former Lieutenant Governor and Auditor of Public Accounts for the Commonwealth of Kentucky. She served in Governor Wendell Ford's executive cabinet and was Secretary of the Executive Cabinet for Governor Paul E. Patton.
Loretta Lynn		(1932–2022)	2004	Loretta Lynn is a country music singer-songwriter and author. She became a part of the country music scene in Nashville in the 1960s, and in 1967 charted her first of 16 number-one hits that include "Don't Come Home A' Drinkin' (With Lovin' on Your Mind)", "You Ain't Woman Enough", "Fist City", and "Coal Miner's Daughter". She focused on blue collar women's issues with themes about philandering husbands and persistent mistresses, and pushed boundaries in the conservative genre of country music by singing about birth control ("The Pill"), repeated childbirth ("One's on the Way"), double standards for men and women ("Rated "X""), and being widowed by the draft during the Vietnam War ("Dear Uncle Sam"). Country music radio stations often refused to play her songs. Nonetheless, she became known as "The First Lady of Country Music". Her best-selling 1976 autobiography was made into an Academy Award-winning film, Coal Miner's Daughter.
Amanda Matthews		(1968–)	2024	Sculptor and creator of the Kentucky COVID Memorial.
Ouita Michel		(1963–)	2025	Chef and restaurateur.
Michael Leo Mullaney		(1922–2018)	2006	Sister Michael Leo Mullaney is a retired hospital administrator. She was the president of Lexington's Saint Joseph Hospital. Mullaney was a nun with the Sisters of Charity of Nazareth and the first woman to serve on the boards of the First Security National Bank & Trust and the Federal Reserve Board of Cleveland.
Mary Margaret Mulvihill		(1942–2020)	2023	City of Louisville 4th Ward Alderwoman (1975–1977).
Jacqueline Noonan		(1928–2020)	2008	Jacqueline Anne Noonan is a pediatric cardiologist best known for her characterization of a genetic disorder now called Noonan syndrome. She was also the original describer of hypoplastic left heart syndrome.
Beula Cornelius Aspley Nunn		(1914–1995)	2007	Beula Cornelius Nunn was First Lady of Kentucky and wife to Governor Louie B. Nunn. She worked to preserve Kentucky history and established the Kentucky Mansion Preservation Foundation.
Clara Sanford Oldham		(1921–2005)	2009	Clara Sanford Oldham was an advocate for women in Kentucky. In 1977 she founded Citizens Against Rape. She was co-founder of Owensboro National Organization for Women and was active with the American Association of University Women.
Peggy Purdom Patterson			2023	First woman federal judge appointed in Kentucky.
Judi Patton		(1940–)	2003	Judi Patton is a former First Lady of Kentucky, wife to Governor Paul E. Patton, and an advocate for the safety of women and children. She created the Office of Child Abuse and Domestic Violence Services and was responsible for over 20 pieces of legislation.
Katherine Graham Peden		(1926–2006)	2003	Katherine Peden was a broadcasting executive and Kentucky Commissioner of Commerce. She served on John F. Kennedy's Presidential Commission on the Status of Women and was a member of the Kerner Commission. She was the Democratic candidate to represent Kentucky in the United States Senate in the 1968 elections.
Mary T. Meagher Plant		(1964–)		Mary T. Meagher is a swimmer, Olympic champion, and world record-holder. In 1981 she bettered her own existing world records in the 100-meter butterfly (57.93) and 200-meter butterfly (2:05.96). These times stood as the respective world records for 18 and 19 years, and are considered to be among the greatest sports performances ever.
Georgia Davis Powers		(1923–2016)		Georgia Davis Powers served for 21 years as a member of the Kentucky Senate. When elected in 1967, she became the first person of color and the first woman elected to that body.
Lillian Henken Press		(1924–2020)	2010	Lillian Press is a former public relations executive and newspaper reporter. She worked at WVLK before organizing the Kentucky Regional Mental Health Board and the Commonwealth's first Comprehensive Care Centers. She directed the Kentucky Governor's Scholars Program and chaired the National Conference of Governor's Schools. In 2002, she organized The Women's Network.
Sara Frances Price		(1849–1903)	1996	Sara F. Price was a naturalist and artist. She published botanical papers and documented the woody plants, ferns and flora of Kentucky. Price's potato-bean and Aster priceae are named for her.
Lyda Ramey		(1909–1991)	2008	Lyda "Gertrude" Ramey was orphaned when her family died of influenza during the 1918 flu pandemic. She spoke out for the welfare of orphans and in 1943 founded the Ramey Home in Catlettsburg, Kentucky.
Kim Michele Richardson			2024	Author and advocate.
Sarah Felt Richardson		(1871–1941)	1996	Sarah Felt Richardson was a Kentucky physician who practiced in Hart County for over four decades. She performed the first recorded surgery to treat breast cancer.
Joan Riehm		(1945–2008)	2012	Mary Joan Riehm was the Deputy Mayor of Louisville and an expert in local government reorganization. She was an advocate for sustainability. The Joan Riehm Environmental Leadership Award and the Joan Riehm Memorial Garden are named for her.
Jean Ritchie		(1922–2015)	2003	Jean Ritchie was an American folk music singer, songwriter, and Appalachian dulcimer player. She was known as "The Mother of Folk" and was awarded a Fulbright scholarship to trace the links between American ballads and the songs of the British Isles.
Verna Mae Slone		(1914–2009)	2010	Verna Mae Slone was an Appalachian author from Knott County. She wrote What My Heart Wants to Tell and made dolls and quilts.
Lucy Harth Smith		(1888–1955)	1996	Lucy Harth Smith was a Kentucky educator and a champion of African-American history. She was the only woman to serve as president of the Kentucky Negro Education Association and was principal of the Booker T. Washington Grade School from 1935 to 1955.
Catherine Spalding		(1793–1858)	1997	Catherine Spalding was elected leader of six women forming a new religious community, the Sisters of Charity of Nazareth, at a time when no education for girls, private health care, or organized social services existed on the Kentucky frontier, On January 6, 2003, The Courier-Journal named her the one woman among the sixteen "most influential people in Louisville/Jefferson County history."
Louise Southgate		(1857–1941)		Louise Southgate was a women's rights activist and physician. She practiced in Covington. Southgate assisted young women in the juvenile court system and was an advocate for birth control in Northern Kentucky.
Ann Stokes		(1907–1997)	1999	Ann Stokes helped to form the Kentucky Nursing Home Association and was a champion for the elderly. She opened nursing home facilities in Corbin, Frankfort, Greensburg, Louisville, and Stanford and lobbied on behalf of strict laws for nursing homes that would support residents' rights.
Thelma Stovall		(1919–1994)	2013	Thelma Stovall was a member of the Kentucky House of Representatives, Secretary of State of Kentucky, Kentucky State Treasurer, and the 47th Lieutenant Governor of Kentucky. In 1978, when Governor Julian Carroll was out of the Commonwealth, she invoked her powers as acting governor and vetoed the Kentucky Legislature's attempt to repeal of its ratification of the Equal Rights Amendment.
Carol Sutton		(1934–1985)	1997	Carol Sutton was a journalist and the first woman to be managing editor of The Courier-Journal. She was cited as an example of female achievement in journalism when Time named American Women as the 1975 People of the Year. During her tenure at the C-J, it was awarded the 1976 Pulitzer Prize for Feature Photography for its coverage of school desegregation in Louisville.
Caroline Burnam Taylor		(1855–1917)	1996	Caroline Burnam Taylor was a Kentucky dressmaker. In 1903, she purchased land for her business, the Mrs. A.H. Taylor Company. The company was Kentucky's largest employer of women.
Julia A. Tevis		(1799–1880)	1996	Julie Ann Tevis founded the Science Hill Female Academy in Shelbyville in 1825. She ran the academy from her home, favoring woman teachers. Over 3000 students matriculated at the academy.
Jeannette Bell Thomas		(1881–1982)	2005	Jean Thomas was an Appalachian musician and folklorist from Ashland. She organized the first American Folk Song Festival and founded the American Folk Song Society. Her field recordings became a part of the Anthology of American Folk Music.
Harriet Drury Van Meter		(1910–1997)	1999	Harriet Drury Van Meter founded the International Book Project in 1966 in her Lexington basement. The organization has distributed over five million books. She was a finalist for the 1986 Nobel Peace Prize.
Gloria Watkins		(1952–2021)	2023	Author and social activist better known by her pen name bell hooks.
Delia Webster		(1817–1904)	1996	Delia Webster was an abolitionist imprisoned and tried with Calvin Fairbank for assisting black slaves in their escape to free states. She founded the Lexington Female Missionary Society girls school and ran a safe house that was part of the Underground Railroad.
Myrtle Weldon		(1890–1971)	1996	Myrtle Weldon was the leader of the University of Kentucky's home demonstration program for 31 years. She toured Kentucky organizing home demonstration clubs and promoting educational home economics programs that taught food preservation. She also promoted the Woman's Land Army of America during World War II.
Judy Moberly West		(1941–1991)	2002	Judge Judy Moberly West was the first woman to be appointed to the Kentucky Court of Appeals. She founded the Hope Cottage Guild and also served as a member of the Prichard Committee for Academic Excellence. In 1987 she was named one of the Outstanding Women of Northern Kentucky.
Mary Wharton		(1912–1991)	2013	Mary E. Wharton was a botanist and conservationist. She chaired Georgetown College's Department of Biological Sciences from 1947 to 1974. She co-founded the Land and Nature Trust of the Bluegrass and worked to preserve Paris Pike and Red River Gorge.
Esther Whitley		(1755–1833)		Esther Whitley was an American pioneer and the spouse of William Whitley. She was a talented markswoman and owned one of the first brick houses in Kentucky, which is now a part of the William Whitley House State Historic Site.
Doris Y. Wilkinson		(1936–2024)	2009	Doris Wilkinson is a professor of sociology at the University of Kentucky who has done pioneering work on critical race theory. She was one of the first African American students to enroll at the University of Kentucky and was the first African American woman to become a full-time faculty member there. She founded the university's African American Studies and Research Program and directs the Project on the African American Heritage.
Enid Yandell		(1869–1934)	1996	Enid Yandell was a sculptor. She studied with Rodin and her work was part of the 1892–3 World's Columbian Exposition. She was part of a group of woman sculptors at the exposition called the White Rabbits and wrote the book Three Girls in a Flat based on her experiences there. A large collection of her work is held by the Speed Art Museum.

== See also ==
- Kentucky Foundation for Women
- List of Kentucky women in the civil rights era
