= Whitley (surname) =

Whitley is a surname. Notable people with the surname include:

- Alice Whitley (1913–1990), Australian chemist and educator
- Benton Whitley (born 1999), American football player
- Charles Orville Whitley (1927–2002), Democratic U.S. Congressman from North Carolina
- Chris Whitley (1960–2005), American singer, songwriter and guitarist
- E. J. Whitley (born 1982), American football player
- Edward Whitley (environmentalist), British financial advisor and philanthropist,
- Edward Whitley (politician) (1825–1892), English solicitor and Conservative Member of Parliament
- Esther Whitley (1755–1833), American pioneer
- Forrest Whitley (born 1997), American baseball player
- Gilbert Percy Whitley (1903–1975), British-born Australian ichthyologist
- Heather Whitley, American physicist
- Henry Charles Whitley (1906–1976), Church of Scotland minister and author
- Herbert Whitley (died 1955), British millionaire and animal breeder who established Paignton Zoo
- Hiram C. Whitley (1834–1919), Second Chief of the United States Secret Service
- Hobart Johnstone Whitley (1847–1931), American land developer
- James Whitley (disambiguation), several people
- Jeff Whitley (born 1979), Zambian-born Northern Irish professional football player
- Jim Whitley (born 1975), Zambian-born Northern Irish professional footballer
- John Whitley (disambiguation), several people
- June Whitley, Canadian actress
- Keith Whitley (1955–1989), American country music singer
- Kevin Whitley (born 1970), American football coach
- Kodi Whitley (born 1995), American baseball player
- Kym Whitley (born 1961), American actress and comedian
- Marissa Whitley, Miss Teen USA 2001, representing the state of Missouri
- Norman Whitley (1890–1982), British Army officer, judge and Olympic silver medalist in lacrosse
- Ray Whitley (singer-songwriter) (1901–1979), American Country and Western singer, radio and Hollywood movie star
- Ray Whitley (songwriter) (1943–2013), American beach music composer and singer-songwriter
- Richard Whitley (born 1948) American screenwriter and producer
- Taylor Whitley (1980–2018), offensive guard in the National Football League
- William Whitley (1749–1813), early American pioneer
