= Ray Whitley =

Ray Whitley may refer to:

- Ray Whitley (singer-songwriter) (1901–1979), American country singer and actor
- Ray Whitley (songwriter) (1943–2013), American beach music composer and singer-songwriter

== See also ==
- Whitley (surname)
