= Tom Dorman State Nature Preserve =

Protected area of Kentucky

Coordinates: 37.765°N 84.627°W

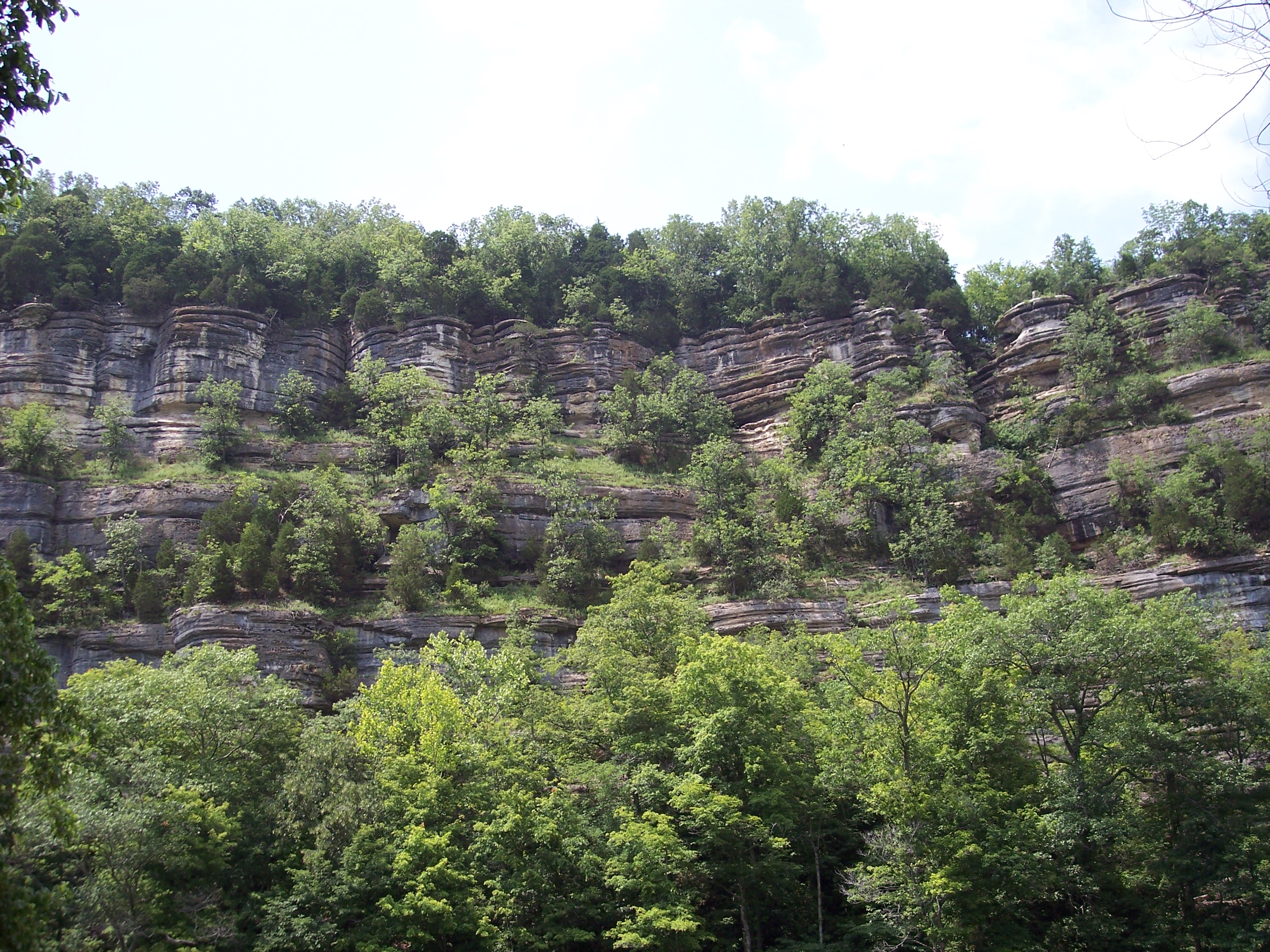
View of the inaccessible Jessamine county section.

Tom Dorman State Nature Preserve is located in both Garrard and Jessamine county Kentucky and protects a section of the Kentucky River Palisades. The preserve is owned by the Office of Kentucky Nature Preserves, and encompasses 880 acres (3.6 km^{2}) of cliffs, bluffs, and bottomland. In 2007, the Kentucky State Parks announced the purchase of 90 acres (360,000 m2) adjacent to Tom Dorman State Nature Preserve for the creation of the new Palisades State Park, but that property was subsequently incorporated into the State Nature Preserve.

The Palisades harbor many rare species for the Bluegrass due to the unusual landscape. The state endangered plants found on Tom Dorman's cliffs are starry cleft phlox (Phlox bifida var. stellaria), Eggleston's violet (Viola egglestonii), and tufted hair-grass (Deschampsia cespitosa); the latter being one of only two populations known in the state. The plants listed as state threatened found here are Kentucky viburnum (Viburnum molle) and False melic (Schizachne purpurascens). The rare Yellowwood tree is also found in this preserve.

This preserve is open to the public. It features a strenuous two mile (3 km) loop following an old stage coach route to the river.
