= Crutcher and Sally Brown Nature Preserves =

Protected areas in Kentucky, US

Coordinates: 37.81481°N 84.68649°W

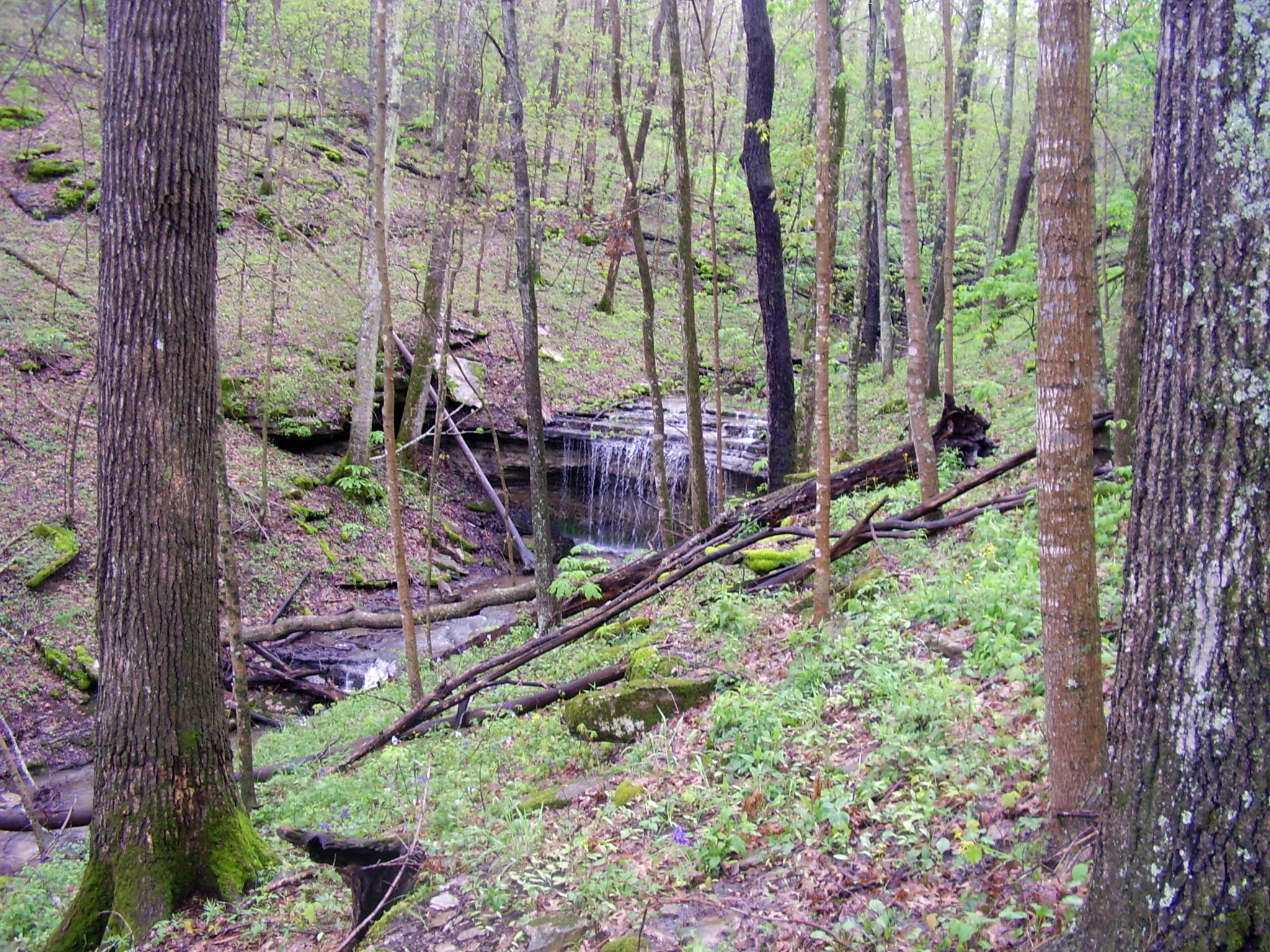
Waterfall in Sally Brown section

Crutcher Nature Preserve and Sally Brown Nature Preserve are two adjacent tracts located in Garrard and Jessamine county Kentucky that also serve to protect a large section of the Kentucky River Palisades. They are owned by The Nature Conservancy, a US charitable environmental organization working to preserve the plants, animals, and natural communities that represent the diversity of life on Earth.

The preserves are open to the public and share a parking lot. They each feature a loop trail providing views of the gorge.

== Flora and fauna ==
The Palisades harbor many rare species for the Bluegrass due to the unusual landscape. Rare plants found in the Crutcher section include the Kentucky viburnum (Viburnum molle) and purple melic grass (Schizachne purpurascens), a northern disjunct finding refuge in the cliffs. Abundant spring wildflowers include Trillium, Virginia Bluebells, and Fringed Phacelia.
