= Esther Whitley =

American pioneer (1755–1833)

Esther Whitley (1755–1833) was an American pioneer who was the third woman of European descent to cross the Cumberland Mountains. Traveling with her husband, William Whitley, she came to Kentucky on Wilderness Road. They built the first brick house in Kentucky which is maintained at the William Whitley House State Historic Site in Crab Orchard, Kentucky.

== Early life ==
Esther Gill Fullen was born in Augusta County, Virginia. Fullen married William Whitley in Virginia, and together they had eight daughters and three sons.

In November 1775, she began the trip west along Wilderness Road with her husband and their family.

== Sportman Hill ==
The Whitleys built an estate called Sportman Hill which contained the first brick house in Kentucky. Sportman Hill had an oval racetrack for horse racing that ran in a counterclockwise direction, differing for the direction of British horse racing.

== Death ==
Esther died at the home of her daughter, Ann Harper, in Woodford County, Kentucky, on November 20, 1833.
