= Louise Southgate =

- Born: February 20, 1857; Walton, Kentucky, US
- Died: August 14, 1941 (aged 84); Walton, Kentucky, US
- Education: Western College, Laura Memorial College
- Occupations: physician, birth control advocate and educator, child welfare advocate and suffragist

Louise Southgate (February 20, 1857 – August 14, 1941) was one of the first women physicians in Northern Kentucky where she advocated for girls in the juvenile court system and was an early proponent of birth control. Besides her medical practice and outreach, she led many efforts for the American women's suffrage movement through her local clubs and the Kentucky Equal Rights Association.

== Early life ==
Louise Southgate was born February 20, 1857, in Walton, Kentucky. She was educated at Western College in Oxford, Ohio, then graduated with a medical degree from Laura Memorial College in Cincinnati, Ohio. She then spent two years studying in hospitals in New York and Europe, traveling as far as to the Pasteur Institute in France for advanced work. She lived with her younger sister Virginia and never married.

== Professional career ==
Dr. Southgate started practicing medicine at the Presbyterian Hospital in Cincinnati in 1893 and also taught at the Laura Memorial College in 1894. She then left for Europe where she practiced medicine for two years. Returning to the U.S. she took up as a clinician again at the Presbyterian Hospital and to the Laura Memorial College where she taught surgical pathology in 1897. She became a member of the American Medical Association, Cincinnati chapter. In 1910 she purchased her maternal grandmother's ancestral home, (the old Thomas Kennedy Home at 124 Garrard Street) and used it also for her private practice. Later, she also worked at the Booth Memorial Hospital as well as its auxiliary. She wrote scholarly articles, including for the State Medical Journal of Kentucky.

=== Community medicine outreach ===
Dr. Southgate was part of the growing movement in women's reproductive health and family planning of the time. She spoke on hygiene ("Care of the Growing Girl"), birth control and eugenics ("Sociological Status of Women"), connecting this with women's rights (e.g., "Women's Duties in Civil Affairs") for women's clubs, Mothers' meetings, as well as for the Woman's Christian Temperance Union. Her work with schools and local clinics helped start the requirements for physical examinations for schoolchildren in Covington.

In 1905, Dr. Southgate spent some time at the Hindman Settlement School in Knott County, eastern Kentucky, where she taught classes and practiced medicine. She was advocating for women's health concerns there long before the more famous Mary Carson Breckinridge of the Frontier Nursing Service or Jean Tachau worked in this area.

=== Women's clubs and suffrage organizations ===
Her work with women's clubs and suffrage organizations was extensive. A partial list of her memberships follows:

- Emergency Association of Covington, president
- General Federation of Women's Clubs
- Kentucky Equal Rights Association, served as KERA press superintendent and State Historian
- Kentucky State Federation of Women's Clubs
- National Equal Rights Association
- Ohio State Federation of Women's Clubs
- Woman's Club of Cincinnati

In 1910 she spoke at the 21st Kentucky Equal Rights Association (KERA) state convention in Covington on the "Sisterhood of Women." She offered a resolution at that meeting that the KERA "extend cordial greetings to the Ky. State Federations of Colored Women's Clubs." Dr. Southgate's influence was revealed in that it was also resolved at that convention that KERA formally requested that the State Board of Charitable Institutions appoint a woman physician at the state asylum for the Insane at Hopkinsville and that each local chapter would begin lobbying for establishing a juvenile court if there wasn't one already in that county.

In 1912 she spoke for suffrage in Cincinnati during the campaign for a suffrage amendment of the Ohio Constitution.

== Hobbies ==
Dr. Southgate was an avid Egyptologist and collected many artifacts that decorated her historic home in Covington (now known as the Kennedy-Southgate House).

== Death ==
After a long illness and at 84 years old, she died on August 14, 1941, at the home of her sister Eleanor Green in Walton, Kentucky. She was buried in Linden Grove Cemetery in Covington. The St. Luke Hospitals named their Women's Center after her in 1990, and her legacy was honored by an entry in the Kentucky Women Remembered collection by the Kentucky Commission on Women in 2000.

== Works ==
- Southgate, M.D., Louise (1905). "Prevalence and Mortality of Epidemic Pneumonia". Virginia Medical Semi-monthly. IX: 107–108.

== See also ==
- Kentucky Equal Rights Association

== Bibliography ==
- Daniels, Betty Maddox (2014). "Louise Southgate". In Tenkotte, Paul A. (ed.). The Encyclopedia of Northern Kentucky. Lexington: University Press of Kentucky. pp. 842–43.
- Mueller, Jan (September 2004). "Dr. Louise Southgate". The Journal of Kentucky Studies. 21: 144–54.
- Poweleit, Alvin C. (1977). Bicentennial of Physicians in Northern Kentucky Past and Present. Newport, Kentucky: Vesper Printing. p. 78.
- Leonard, John William, ed. (1914). "Southgate, Louise". Woman's Who's Who of America: A Biographical Dictionary of Contemporary Women of the United States and Canada, Volume 1. New York: The American Commonwealth Co. p. 767.
