= Allie Hixson =

Allie Corbin Hixson
- Born: May 28, 1924
- Died: October 30, 2007 (aged 83)
- Occupation: Feminist advocate

Allie Corbin Hixson (May 28, 1924 – October 30, 2007) was a feminist advocate working for women's rights and the passage of the Equal Rights Amendment to the United States Constitution. Hixson is credited with being the first woman to earn a Ph.D. in English from the University of Louisville in 1961. Her portrait was hung in the Kentucky State Capitol Rotunda as part of the Kentucky Women Remembered exhibit.

== Early life and education ==
Allie Corbin was born in southern Kentucky on May 28, 1924. She relocated to Louisville, Kentucky, where she married William Forrest Hixson, and they had three children together. She is credited with being the first woman to earn a Ph.D. in English from the University of Louisville.

== Women's rights and ERA ==
Later in life, at age 51, Hixson became an advocate for women's rights and the passage of the Equal Rights Amendment to the United States Constitution. She was a vice chair of the National Women's Conference in Houston in 1977. In 1986, Hixson and Riane Eisler co-authored ERA Facts and Guide, a handbook about the Equal Rights Amendment. In 1992, Hixson became the founding chair of the Equal Rights Amendment Summit. Hixson was also the founder of the Louisville chapter of the Older Women's League. She was a founder of the Louisville Chapter of the Older Women's League and was active in the American Association of University Women, Business and Professional Women, and Rural American Women.

== Death and legacy ==
Hixson advocated for the passage of the ERA until the time of her death on October 30, 2007. Her work for women's rights was recognized by the Kentucky Women Remembered exhibit, with her portrait hung in an exhibit in the Kentucky State Capitol Rotunda.
