= Mary Willie Arvin =

American nurse and WWI veteran

Margaret (Mary) Willie Arvin ARRC (April 21, 1879 – September 9, 1947) was a nurse from Henderson, Kentucky, who served in the First World War in France at a British Army Hospital, and was one of the few women who was honored by all three of the major allied countries, France, Britain and the United States. Arvin was the most decorated Kentucky woman veteran serving in World War I. She was awarded the British Royal Red Cross (2nd Associate) Medal, the U. S. Army citation for exceptionally meritorious and conspicuous service (later exchanged for a Purple Heart), and the French Croix de guerre. Arvin was one of the first women to earn a Purple Heart. In 2006, Arvin was honored by the Kentucky Women Remembered and her portrait hangs in an exhibit at the Kentucky State Capital Rotunda.

== Early life and education ==
Margaret Willie Arvin, known as Mary, was born on April 21, 1879, to William and Bettie Arvin, of Henderson, Kentucky. Arvin graduated from Owensboro City Hospital School of Nursing in 1904. She worked as a nurse in Memphis, Tennessee.

== First World War ==
In June 1917, Arvin joined the American Red Cross and was stationed at The Harvard Unit, Base Hospital #5, a hospital unit staffed by physicians and nurses from the Harvard University Hospital, in Boston, Massachusetts. The Harvard Unit was deployed to support the British Expeditionary Forces in France, and Arvin joined the unit in Pas-de-Calais, France in July 1917.

On September 4, 1917, Base Hospital # 5 was attacked during a night raid by German bombers, and the first American battlefield casualties of the First World War were members of Base Hospital # 5. Arvin cared for her patients during the attack. Another night bombing attacked occurred on June 30, 1918, to Base Hospital # 5. For her service Arvin received official letters of commendation from General John Pershing.

In a letter of commendation, General John Pershing wrote, "My Dear Miss Arvin: Please accept my heartiest congratulations and sincere appreciation of the fine work you did on the night of June 30, 1918, when your hospital was a target of German airplane bombs. Your presence of mind and courage in quieting your patients was, under the circumstances, deserving of the highest praise. I am proud to have in the American Expeditionary Forces a nurse whose devotion to duty is of such high character as yours."

For her outstanding work, Arvin received the French Croix de guerre.

On November 11, 1918, World War I ended, and by March 1919 Arvin was back in her hometown of Henderson, Kentucky. In April she received the United States Army's citation for exceptionally meritorious and conspicuous service from General Pershing. At a ceremony held in Washington, D.C., on November 13, 1919, Arvin received her British Royal Red Cross (2nd Associate) Medal from Prince Edward. Arvin is one of few American women to be honored by all three of the major allied countries, France, Britain and the United States.

In October 1919, she began a job as a Red Cross welfare worker in Hopkinsville, Kentucky.

== Later life and marriages ==
Arvin relocated to Orlando, Florida where she worked in as a nurse in a hospital. On March 28, 1925, she married William H. Tiller, a World War I veteran and Orlando realtor. And after his death, in 1932 she remarried of Robert H. Sissons, another World War I veteran.

== Death and legacy ==
Arvin died on September 9, 1947, in Henderson, Kentucky. She was buried in the Fernwood Cemetery in Henderson. In 2010, a Kentucky historical marker that describes her service to her country was placed by her grave in the Fernwood Cemetery.

In 2006, Arvin was selected to be honored as Kentucky Women Remembered and her portrait hangs in an exhibit at the Kentucky State Capital Rotunda.
