= Murphy's Pond =

Coordinates: 36.741°N 88.856°W

Murphy's Pond (sometimes referred to as Murphy Pond) is a wetlands complex located in Hickman County, Kentucky, United States. While only about 175 acres (71 hectares) in size, the pond is notable for being one of the largest bald cypress swamps remaining in Kentucky and for its high cottonmouth snake (Agkistrodon piscivorus) population density.

To protect the pond from the effects of surrounding commercial development, the pond and its immediate surroundings were added to the 1,402 acres (567 hectares) Obion Creek Wildlife Management Area by the Office of Kentucky Nature Preserves in 2005, forming the Obion Creek and Murphy's Pond State Nature Preserve, which further grew to 1,601 acres (648 hectares) in 2007. The pond itself is owned and managed by Murray State University, located 30 miles east in Murray, Kentucky. Murray State acquired the property in 1975 with a grant from The Nature Conservancy. Access to the pond is restricted for scientific research purposes only and requires written permission from the university. Students seeking a degree in fisheries or aquatic biology at Murray State use the pond for field investigations.

Murphy's Pond is mostly swampland, with only small sections of open water. The pond and the surrounding lowlands, formed by Obion Creek and its tributaries, support one of the highest concentrations of cottonmouths in the United States. The pond is near the northernmost point of the snake's range.
