= Pilot Knob State Nature Preserve =

Nature preserve in Powell County, Kentucky

Coordinates: 37.911°N 83.936°W

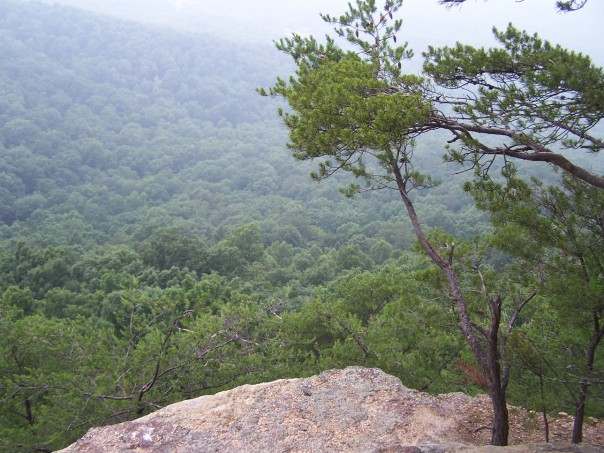

Pilot Knob State Nature Preserve is located in Powell County, Kentucky, US. It is a 1,257.93-acre nature preserve in Eastern Kentucky.

A 730-foot (220 m) outcrop, known as Pilot Knob, is believed to be the place where legendary frontiersman Daniel Boone and his companion John Finley first looked out over the area in 1769.

It is owned and managed by the Office of Kentucky Nature Preserves.

== Geography and nature ==
Pilot Knob State Nature Preserve initially consisted of 308 acres that were dedicated on September 26, 1985, while an additional 949.93 acres were later added by the Kentucky Land Heritage Conservation Fund, bringing the total to 1,257.93 acres. The highest point of the preserve, Pilot Knob, sits at an elevation of 730 feet (220 m). Pilot Knob is also sometimes referred to as "Boone's Overlook". The Cumberland Plateau, the Knobs region and the Bluegrass region can be seen from this vantage point. Pilot Knob itself is made of Pennsylvanian conglomerate sandstone. Many different types of sediments are embedded into the rock as a result of an ancient stream that used to flow there. Parts of this conglomerate rock were quarried and used for millstones.

The preserve has an oak-hickory secondary forest and consists of many different forest communities that vary due to elevation, soil inconsistencies and variances in sunlight and moisture levels. The Blackjack oak and Virginia pine trees towards the top of the summit are stunted in growth after adapting to being exposed to harsher conditions such as elevated sunlight and winds.

The Kentucky Ornithological Society recognizes Pilot Knob State Nature Preserve as an Eastern Kentucky birding location.

== History ==
It is believed that on June 7, 1769, Daniel Boone and John Finley first looked out across what is now the Bluegrass region from the summit of Pilot Knob before setting up camp and preparing to explore the surrounding area. John Finley referred to the view from the outcrop as "the beautiful level of Kentucky". John Filson later became Daniel Boone's ghostwriter for his autobiography. He writes that Daniel Boone says about his experience at Pilot Knob, "I had gained the summit of a commanding ridge...beheld the ample plains, the beauteous tracts below."

The Kentucky Historical Society recognizes June 7 as "Boone Day" in honor of this historic moment.

== Recreation ==
Pilot Knob State Nature Preserve is considered a recreation area for hiking, studying nature, geology and birding. There are two main hiking trails located on the preserve. There is a strenuous ascent to the summit along the 2.4-mile Oscar Geralds, Jr. Trail. There is also 2.0-mile trail that loops around the base of the area, known as Sage Point Trail, that is also considered strenuous. The main dangers of this recreation area are cliffs and venomous snakes that reside there. Camping, rock climbing, mountain biking and bringing pets are not permitted so as to not disturb the nature preserve. The preserve is open for recreation from sunrise to sundown.
