= William Whitley House State Historic Site =

- Interactive map of William Whitley House State Historic Site
- Location: Lincoln, Kentucky, United States
- Coordinates: 37°28′05″N 84°33′00″W
- Elevation: 938 ft (286 m)
- Established: 1938
- Governing body: Kentucky Department of Parks
- Website: William Whitley House State Historic Site
- William Whitley House State Shrine
- U.S. National Register of Historic Places
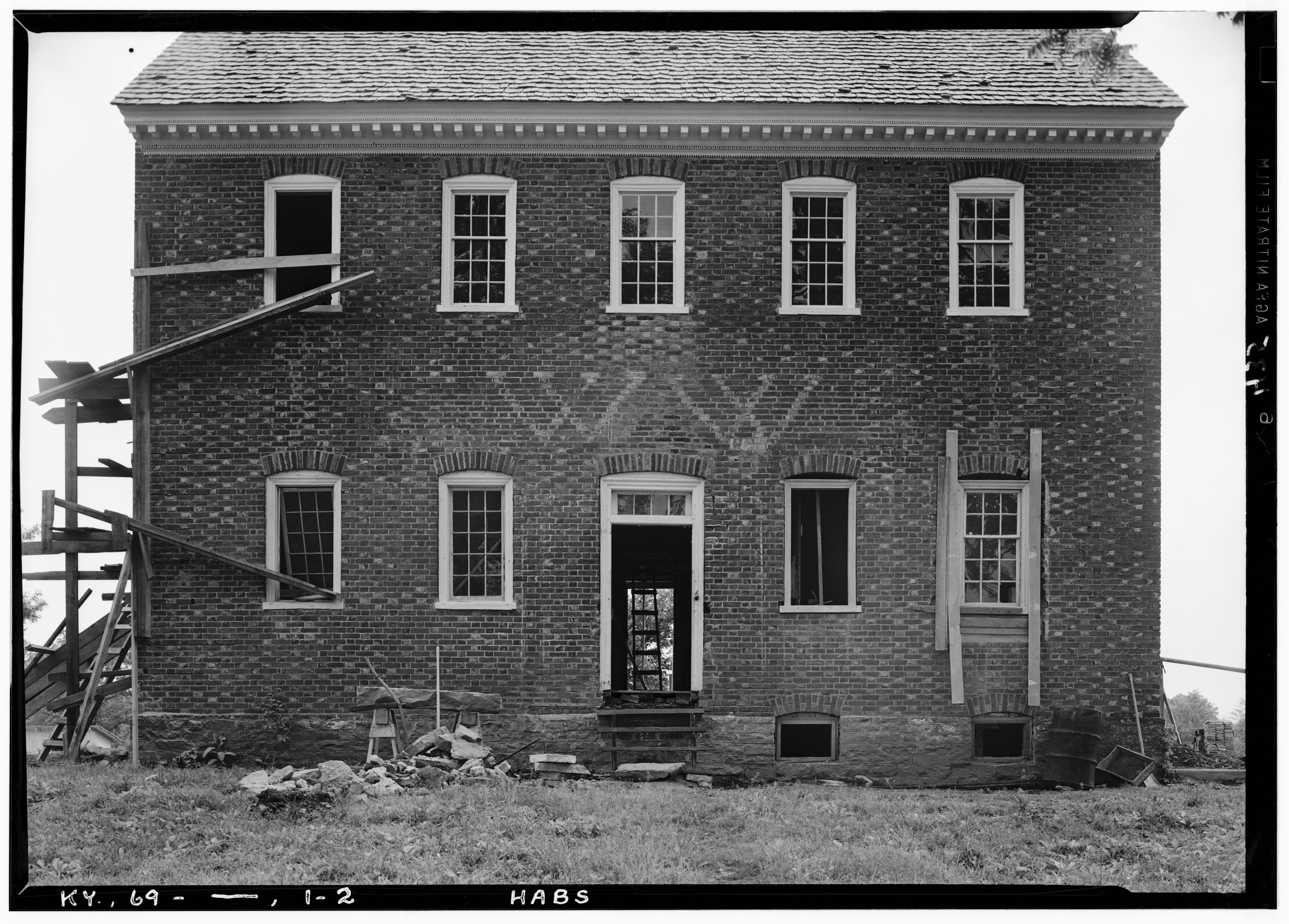
- Front of the house as it appeared in 1940

- Location within Kentucky Location within the United States
- Nearest city: Crab Orchard, Kentucky
- Built: 1787
- Architect: William Whitley
- NRHP reference No.: 73000814
- Added to NRHP: April 11, 1973

William Whitley House State Historic Site is a park in Crab Orchard, Kentucky. It features the home of Kentucky pioneer William Whitley and his wife, sharpshooter Esther Whitley. The home was built as a fortress against Indian attacks sometime between 1787 and 1794. The first brick house in Kentucky, its construction marked a transition in the area from log cabins to more formal homes. The site became part of the park system in 1938, and the house was restored by locals between 1948 and 1955. Additional property has been purchased for the park by the Office of Kentucky Nature Preserves' Kentucky Heritage Land Conservation Fund, including Sportsman's Hill, the first horse racing track west of the Appalachians. In 2019 management of the site was adopted by the Lincoln County Fiscal Court with assistance from local historians.

== See also ==
- List of the oldest buildings in Kentucky
