= Claire Louise Caudill =

American physician (1912–1998)

- Claire Louise Caudill (left) with Susie Halbleib (right), April 28, 1957
- Born: August 19, 1912; Morehead, Kentucky, U.S.
- Died: December 31, 1998 (aged 86); Lexington, Kentucky, U.S.
- Education: Ohio State University (BS); University of Louisville
- Parent(s): Daniel Boone Caudill; Rosetta Proctor
- Relatives: Lucille Caudill Little (sister)

Claire Louise Caudill (August 19, 1912 – December 31, 1998) was an American physician from Rowan County, Kentucky. She and her nurse Susie Halbleib co-founded the St. Claire Regional Medical Center in Morehead, Kentucky. It is estimated that she delivered over 8,000 babies between 1957 and 1998.

== Biography ==
Claire Louise Caudill was born on August 19, 1912, in Morehead, Kentucky. She was one of five children of Daniel Boone Caudill and Rosetta Proctor. From 1930 to 1934, she attended Ohio State University, where she earned a Bachelor of Science in education. While attending Ohio State, she was a member of Pi Beta Phi. In 1946, Caudill received her medical doctorate from the University of Louisville.

After receiving her medical doctorate, Caudill traveled to Oneida, Kentucky, where she met Susie Halbleib, a nurse at Oneida Maternity Hospital. She and Halbleib traveled to Caudill's hometown of Morehead, where they opened a medical practice. The pair spent most of their time visiting homes, delivering babies, and advocating for advances in healthcare in Eastern Kentucky.

At the time, there was no hospital in the area. People across the region had to go to Lexington, Ashland, or Cincinnati to receive healthcare. Caudill was determined to ensure quality healthcare for people in the region, and she played a significant role in the establishment of the St. Claire Regional Medical Center in 1961. The hospital is named in her honor.

Caudill delivered an estimated 8,000 during the 50 years she practiced medicine. She would continue to practice medicine until her death in 1998. In 1994, she received the country doctor of the year award. She was chosen over 100 nominees that practiced medicine in rural areas. Caudill was interviewed by CBS, and was featured in USA Today. In 1999, her portrait was installed in the Kentucky Women Remembered exhibit at the Kentucky State Capitol in Frankfort.

Morehead State University awards the C. Louise Caudill Scholarship for women. The scholarship is for female students wishing to enter a career in medicine or healthcare.

== Bibliography ==
- Gish, Shirley (1999). "Country Doctor: The Story of Dr. Claire Louise Caudill". UKnowledge. The University Press of Kentucky.
