= Office of Kentucky Nature Preserves =

The Office of Kentucky Nature Preserves is an agency of the Commonwealth of Kentucky in the United States dedicated to the protection of Kentucky's natural heritage. The agency's primary focus is protecting rare and endangered species habitats. It oversees a statewide program of nature preserves, the Kentucky Wild Rivers Program, and the "Nature's Finest" license plate program of the Kentucky Heritage Land Conservation Fund Board. The program was formerly known as the "Kentucky State Nature Preserves Commission", from 1976 until a reorganization in 2018.

As of July 1, 2018, Office of Kentucky Nature Preserves programs include:

- 19,217 acres owned by KNP in 41 State Nature Preserves;
- 6,245 acres owned by KNP in 6 State Natural Areas;
- 7,324 acres dedicated by KNP in 22 State Nature Preserves owned by partnering agencies;
- 11,894 acres in conservation easements at 52 KHLCF natural areas owned by local concerns;
- 59,556 acres of deed-restricted property in 26 KHLCF natural areas owned by other state agencies;
- 8,260 acres owned by private landowners and other agencies in 59 Registered Natural Areas;
- 26,382 acres owned by private landowners and other agencies in 9 Wild Rivers Corridors.

The total of 112,000 acres in these programs is only 0.44% of Kentucky's 25 million acres.

Statewide Nature Preserve / Natural Area List:

- Abbey of Gethsemane Registered Natural Area
- Axe Lake Swamp State Nature Preserve
- Bad Branch Falls State Nature Preserve
- Bat Cave and Cascade Caverns State Nature Preserves
- Beargrass Creek State Nature Preserve
- Bissell Bluff SNA
- Blackacre Nature Preserve and Historic Homestead
- Blanton Forest State Nature Preserve
- Blue Licks State Nature Preserve
- Boone County Cliffs SNP
- Bouteloua Barrens SNP
- Brigadoon State Nature Preserve
- Camp Nelson Heritage National Monument
- Chaney Lake SNP
- Crooked Creek Barrens SNP
- Cumberland Falls SPNP
- Cypress Creek SNP
- Dinsmore Woods SNP
- Drennon Creek State Nature Preserve
- Eastview Barrens SNP
- Flat Rock Glade SNP
- Floracliff SNP
- Frances Johnson Palk SNP
- Goodrum Cave SNP
- Hi Lewis Pine Barrens SNP
- James E. Bickford SNP
- Jesse Stuart SNP
- Jim Scudder SNP
- John B. Stephenson Memorial Forest SNP
- John James Audubon State Park State Nature Preserve
- Julian Savanna SNP
- Kingdom Come State Park State Nature Preserve
- Logan County Glade SNP
- Lower Howard's Creek Heritage Park and SNP
- Martin's Fork SNA
- Metropolis Lake SNP
- Natural Bridge State Park State Nature Preserve
- Newman's Bluff SNA
- Obion Creek SNP including Murphy's Pond
- Perryville Battlefield State Historic Site
- Pilot Knob State Nature Preserve
- Pine Mountain SPNP
- Quiet Trails SNP
- Raymond Athey Barrens SNP
- River Cliffs SNP
- Short's Goldenrod SNP
- Six Mile Island State Nature Preserve
- Springhouse Barrens SNP
- Stone Mountain SNA
- Terrapin Creek SNP
- Thompson Creek Glades SNP
- Three Ponds SNP
- Tom Dorman SNP
- Vernon-Douglas SNP
- Woodburn Glade SNP
- SNP indicates State Nature Preserve
- SPNP indicates State Park Nature Preserve
- SNA indicates State Natural Area

== Projects ==
- Kentucky River Palisades
