= Brigadoon State Nature Preserve =

State nature preserve in Kentucky, United States

- Location within Kentucky Location within the United States
- Location: Barren County, Kentucky, United States
- Nearest city: Glasgow, Kentucky
- Coordinates: 36.8977°N 85.9811°W
- Area: 184 acres (74 ha)
- Established: March 14, 1985
- Website: Official website

Brigadoon State Nature Preserve is a state nature preserve located in Barren County, Kentucky adjacent to Barren River Lake.

The Office of Kentucky Nature Preserves purchased 92 acres (37 ha) of mostly mature forest from the Nature Conservancy that was dedicated into the preserve system on March 14, 1985. An additional 88 acres (36 ha) were dedicated on June 12, 2001. Including another 4-acre (1.6 ha) tract, a total of 184 acres (74 ha) are protected.

The forest is dominated by American beech, maple, and tulip poplar, with an array of spring wildflowers, including several species that are considered rare or uncommon in Kentucky. There is also habitat for numerous migratory and resident birds in the preserve. The preserve is open to the public and includes at 1 mile (1.6 km) trail.
