= Alberta Odell Jones =

African-American attorney and civil rights icon

- Born: November 12, 1930; Louisville, Kentucky, U.S.
- Died: August 5, 1965 (aged 34); Louisville, Kentucky, U.S.
- Education: Louisville Municipal College; Howard University School of Law
- Occupations: Attorney, Activist

Alberta Odell Jones (November 12, 1930 – August 5, 1965) was an African-American attorney and civil rights icon. She was one of the first African-American women to pass the Kentucky bar and the first woman appointed city attorney in Jefferson County. She was murdered by an unknown person.

== Early life and education ==
Alberta Odell Jones was born in Louisville, Kentucky, on November 12, 1930, to Odell and Sarah (Sadie) Crawford Jones.

Jones graduated from Louisville Central High School in 1948. She then attended Louisville Municipal College (LMC), which later merged with the University of Louisville during desegregation, and majored in accounting. Jones graduated third in her class. She attended the University of Louisville Law School for one year, transferring to Howard University School of Law for her degree, graduating fourth in her class in 1959. During her time at Howard University, Jones served on the staff of the Howard Law journal and worked as a student counselor. Upon graduating, she had several interviews in Washington and Senator John Sherman Cooper offered his office as a study space for the bar exam.

== Career and activism ==
In 1959, upon admission to the Kentucky bar the same year she received her law degree, Jones became Kentucky's first practicing African-American woman attorney. The day after receiving the notification that she had passed the bar, Jones had already accepted her first case. As she explained to The Courier-Journal, "This girl I know asked me four years ago – when she separated from her husband – to handle her divorce. I promised I would if I made the grade."

In 1960, Jones eventually took on a prominent client early in her career, a young boxer who later changed his name from Cassius Clay to Muhammad Ali, introducing him to trainer Archie Moore of California. She was appointed in February 1965 to the Louisville Domestic Relations Court, where she was a prosecutor.

=== Activism ===
Jones was active in the civil rights movement, taking part in protest marches in Louisville and attending the March on Washington in August 1963. Upon returning from Washington she formed the Independent Voters Association of Louisville and was very involved with the Louisville chapter of the Urban League. She rented voting machines and taught African Americans how to use the machines to vote. She was also active in the National Association for the Advancement of Colored People. Another of her causes was a fundraising effort to pay the medical bills of a young man, James "Bulky" Welch, who lost his arms saving his dog trapped under a train, purchasing him prosthetic arms by auctioning a car.

== Unsolved murder ==
On August 5, 1965, Jones was murdered. Her killing was first attributed to drowning and her body was retrieved from the Ohio River. However, her car was found several blocks from the Sherman Minton Bridge with blood inside and a subsequent autopsy determined that she had been subjected to several severe blows to the head before entering the water.

Jones' murder was one of six unsolved murders in the area that year. On September 28, 1965, a Courier-Journal headline declared "300 Interviewed in Jones Murder" and the article announced Police Chief William E. Bindner's plan to increase police patrols in Louisville's West End. The investigation determined that she had been beaten unconscious with a brick and witnesses recalled seeing a body tossed by three unidentified men from the bridge, where her purse was later found.

In 2017, efforts were made to reopen the Jones case and it became a cause célèbre. Detectives involved in the initial investigation were interviewed in the hope that new leads had surfaced over the 52 years since the killing. Professor and attorney Lee Remington, who was doing research for a biography, found clues to the murder and sent a letter to the Louisville police, who agreed to reopen the case. The civil rights division of the Department of Justice also began an investigation. The investigation is funded by a new law, the Emmett Till Unsolved Civil Rights Crime Act, which provides $13.5 million annual funds to the Department of Justice, the Federal Bureau of Investigation, and state and local law enforcement agencies to investigate and prosecute pre-1970 killings. Her killing remains unsolved.

== Legacy ==
In October 2022, Louisville Central High School presented the first ever Alberta O. Jones award to Laura Rothstein, a retired University of Louisville law professor who helped start the high school's law and government magnet program. The award, which may not be given annually, is said to be intended for "those who have worked as hard as Jones to make their community a better place."

The Alberta O. Jones Park in the California neighborhood of Louisville was dedicated in November 2023, featuring a photomosaic mural of Jones.

A statue of Jones was unveiled in Louisville, Kentucky, on May 15, 2026.

Jones is among four women who will be added to the Kentucky Women Remembered exhibit, located in the West Wing of the Kentucky State Capitol. This was recommended unanimously by a selection panel, and Governor Andy Beshear announced it in November 2024. Organized by the Kentucky Commission on Women, the exhibit began at the 1978 Kentucky State Fair, and in 1996 relocated to the Capitol.

== See also ==
- List of unsolved murders (1900–1979)
