= John Whitley =

John Whitley could refer to:

- John Robinson Whitley (1843–1922), British entrepreneur
- John Henry Whitley (1866–1935), British politician
- John Whitley (RAF officer) (1905–1997), British Air Marshal
- John Whitley (prison warden) (born 1944), American corrections official
- John E. Whitley (born 1970), American government official
