= Lucille Caudill Little =

American patron of the arts (1909–2002)

Mary Lucille Caudill Little
- Born: August 20, 1909; Morehead, Kentucky
- Died: October 8, 2002 (aged 93); Lexington, Kentucky
- Occupation: Philanthropist
- Spouse: W. Paul Little
- Parent(s): Rosetta Proctor and Daniel Boone Caudill
- Relatives: Claire Louise Caudill (sister)

Lucille Caudill Little (August 20, 1909 – October 8, 2002) was an American patron of the arts and philanthropist who served as president of the W. Paul and Lucille Caudill Little Foundation in Lexington, Kentucky.

== Biography ==
Mary Lucille Caudill was born in 1909 in Morehead, the county seat of Rowan County, Kentucky. She was one of five children (sisters Dr. Claire Louise Caudill and Patricia Caudill Eubank; and brothers Boone Proctor Caudill and Dr. Charles Milton Caudill) of Rosetta Proctor and Judge Daniel Boone Caudill. Her father was a lawyer and a banker as well as a popular circuit judge of the Twenty-First District.

She attended elementary and high school in Morehead and graduated from Hamilton College, a girls finishing school in Lexington, Kentucky. In the 1920s she attended eleven colleges, including Transylvania College, the University of Kentucky, Morehead College (now Morehead State University), and studied voice at Stetson College in Florida. She was a member of Pi Beta Phi, having been initiated into the chapter at the Ohio State University. In 1932 she earned a bachelor's degree in voice from Ohio State University, took graduate courses at Columbia University and then at Juilliard School of Music (where she earned a scholarship). She continued her studies in New York with vocal scientist Dr. Douglas Stanley, with Lily Pons as accompanist. After performing in New York, she served on the faculty of Morehead State Teachers College where she taught speech and started up the department of theatre. Later, she served as a volunteer teacher at a P-12 private school in Lexington, Sayre School.

She married W. Paul Little, a businessman and thoroughbred breeder, in 1937 at the age of 28 and they made Lexington, in the heart of the Bluegrass state, their home. Paul Little was a successful thoroughbred breeder and owner, having bred Wild Again and 28 other stakes winners.

In 1979 she was kidnapped by a young man whose father worked at Paul Little's tobacco warehouse in Lexington, Kentucky. She went to the bank to collect her own ransom of $85,000 and told the police. They followed and, while she was on the floor in the backseat of her own car, exchanged fire with the kidnapper.

After her husband's death in 1990, Mrs. Little was the sole heir to a large fortune. In 1999, the W. Paul & Lucille Caudill Little Foundation was the 9th-ranked foundation in Kentucky by total dollars donated.

== Philanthropy ==
Because of her training in the arts, Little focused the Paul & Lucille Caudill Little Foundation in the areas of the arts and education. The purpose of the foundation is to develop creativity mainly through the fine arts. The Foundation's funds were originally administered by the Bank of the Bluegrass and Trust Company, and today by the Blue Grass Community Foundation. Gifts were awarded quarterly to nonprofit organizations that had been in existence for at least three years. The organizations must have served in and around Central and Eastern Kentucky, specifically Fayette, Rowan or Elliott County. Grants tended to range in amount from $5,000 to $1 million. In May 2011, however, the Foundation announced the largest awards ever presented: $2.5 million each for the Lexington Children's Theatre (Shooting Star Youtheatre outreach to Rowan and Elliott Counties) and for Morehead State University's scholarships for students primarily from Rowan or Elliott County who pursue a Bachelor of Arts degree in art, music or theatre. The final awards of the Paul & Lucille Little Foundation were made in July 2011.

Little's involvement in the cultural life of central Kentucky led to the establishment of several entities. She founded and led the following:

- Lexington Children's Theatre, founded in 1939 (director in 1940),
- Studio Players, founded in 1952 (director),
- Lexington Council on Social Planning (president),
- Lexington Symphony (board member),
- Lexington Philharmonic, founded in 1961 as the Central Kentucky Philharmonic Orchestra (board member),
- Bluegrass Girl Scout Council, now Wilderness Road Council (president),
- Society of Fellows of the Lexington Arts and Cultural Council, created out of 21 organizations in 1972 (board member),
- ArtsPlace (board member),
- Central Kentucky Youth Orchestra, founded in 1947 (board member),
- Living Arts & Science Center, founded in 1968 (board member)

Her leadership was invaluable to the following organizations:

- National Society of Arts and Letters
- Board of Trustees at Transylvania University
- Board of Trustees at Midway College
- Board of Directors of the Bank of the Bluegrass
- University of Kentucky Library Associates Executive Committee
- Lexington Opera Society
- Board of Directors, The Henry Clay Memorial Foundation at Ashland, the Henry Clay Estate.

She also enjoyed singing as the soprano soloist at Central Christian Church in Lexington.

Numerous Kentucky entities have benefited from her generous contributions, including the Lexington Ballet, the Opera Guild of Central Kentucky, the Headley-Whitney Museum, the Central Kentucky Women's Club, Hospice of the Bluegrass, the Salvation Army, United Campus Ministries, Lexington Theological Seminary, Midway College, First Christian Church, St. Clair Medical Center in Morehead, the Lexington Arts and Cultural Council, Lexington Musical Theatre and the Actors Guild of Lexington. The Foundation established a permanent endowment at Kentucky Educational Television to integrate the performing arts into Kentucky's elementary education.

Even larger projects include a $1-million donation to the University of Kentucky in the 1990s to establish a combined fine arts library, which opened in 2000 as the Lucille Caudill Little Fine Arts Library. Her gifts were matched by Mr. William T. Young and the Kentucky Council on Postsecondary Education's Research Challenge Initiative, resulting in the creation of a Library Endowment Fund. The Little Library is the home of the John Jacob Niles Gallery.

The Lucille C. Little Theater at Transylvania University, where Little was a member of the class of 1928, was completed in 1999. Another gift of $1 million to the Kentucky Horse Park Foundation will endow the International Museum of the Horse with the W. Paul Little Cultural and Learning Center. She endowed the Lillian H. Press Distinguished Speakers Series at Centre College and gave $100,000 to the Commonwealth Institute for Parent Leadership.

Mrs. Little conceived the horse-themed pendulum clock which was installed in the central branch of the Lexington Public Library in 2001.

When asked why she chose to give her donations to art organizations, she replied:

I wish people could feel the power of the arts. That the arts can be in their living. It has been such a power in my life and has led me into such beautiful pathways, that I would like everybody to have the experience.

== Awards ==
Little received honorary doctorate degrees from Transylvania University, Georgetown College, the University of Kentucky, and Morehead State University. She was awarded the Lexington Optimist Club Cup. Her portrait was installed in the Kentucky capitol in the Kentucky Commission on Women's Kentucky Women Remembered exhibit in March 2002.

== Bibliography ==
- Lane, Ed G. (October 2001). "Lucille Caudill: 'I Have Called Myself a College Tramp'". One-on-One. The Alexander Stewart Family of Kentucky. Archived from the original on 6 November 2016.

== See also ==
- Margaret I. King Library
- Morehead State University
