= Crab Orchard, Kentucky =

- City
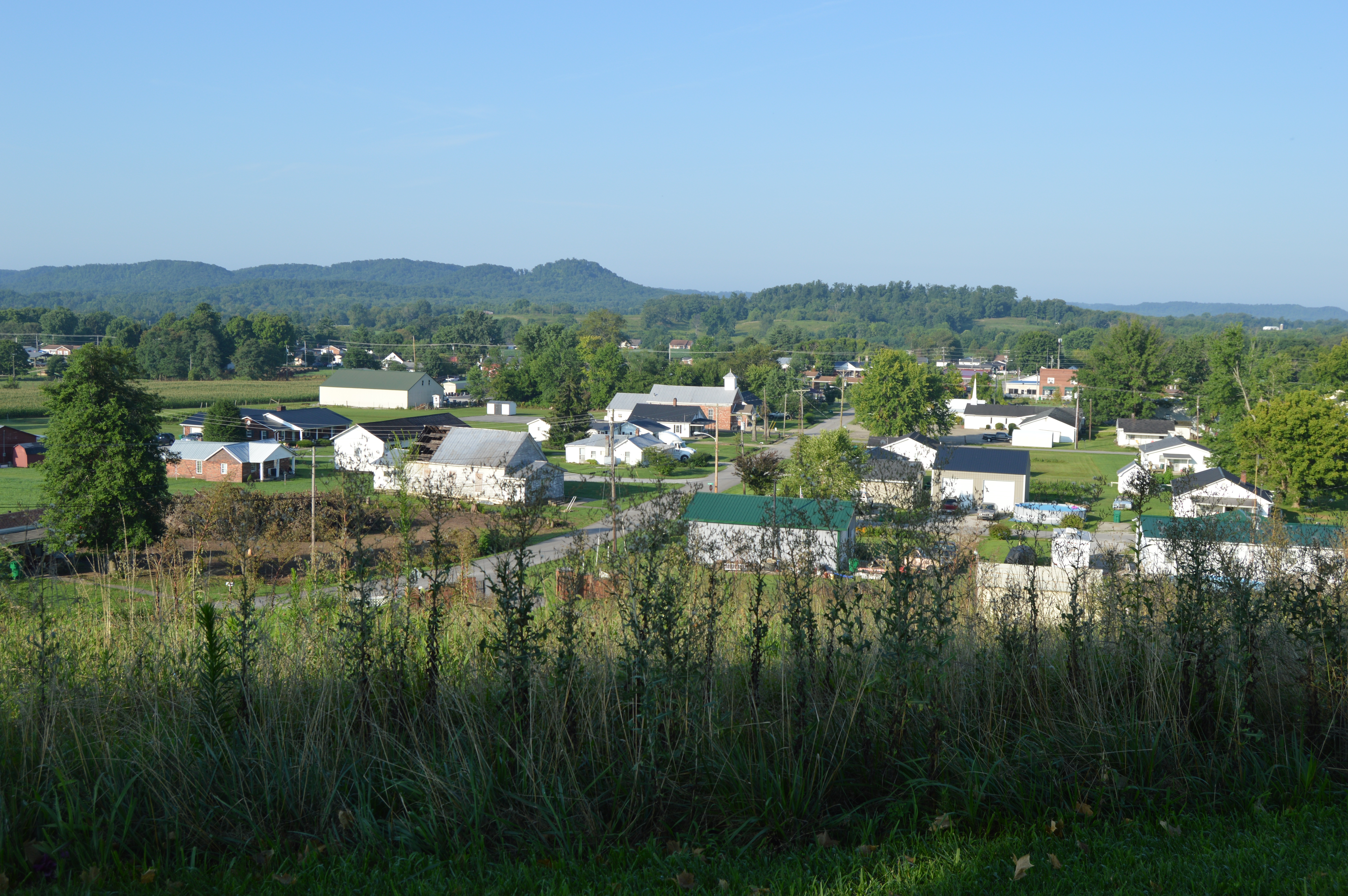
- View from the city cemetery
- Interactive map of Crab Orchard, Kentucky
- Location within Kentucky Location within the United States
- Coordinates: 37°27′46″N 84°30′24″W
- Country: United States
- State: Kentucky
- County: Lincoln
- Post Office opened: 1815

Area
  - Total: 1.76 sq mi (4.6 km^{2})
  - Land: 1.75 sq mi (4.5 km^{2})
  - Water: 0.012 sq mi (0.031 km^{2})
- Elevation: 942 ft (287 m)

Population (2020)
  - Total: 744
  - Density: 426.2/sq mi (164.6/km^{2})
- Time zone: UTC-5 (EST)
  - Summer (DST): UTC-4 (EDT)
- ZIP code: 40419
- Area code: 606
- FIPS code: 21-17956
- GNIS feature ID: 2404143
- Website: https://craborchard.ky.gov/

Crab Orchard is a home rule-class city in Lincoln County, Kentucky, United States. The population was 744 as of the 2020 census. It is part of the Danville micropolitan area.

== History ==
Crab Orchard was near the end of the Logan Trace of the Wilderness Road and was an early pioneer station. It was named for a large stand of crab apple trees located by early pioneer Henry Long Hunter Skaggs. The post office was established in 1815, with Archibald Shanks its first postmaster.

There are several mineral springs in the area, and from 1827 until 1922, taverns and hotels were located at Crab Orchard Springs. Crab Orchard was also a station on the Louisville and Nashville Railroad.

== Geography ==
Crab Orchard is located in eastern Lincoln County in the Knobs 3 miles west of the Rockcastle County line. U.S. Route 150 passes around the southern and western edges of the city, leading northwest 11 miles (18 km) to Stanford, the county seat, and southeast 13 miles (21 km) to Mount Vernon. Kentucky Route 39 passes through Crab Orchard as Main Street, leading north 12 miles (19 km) to Lancaster and south 28 miles (45 km) to Somerset.

According to the United States Census Bureau, Crab Orchard has a total area of 1.8 square miles (4.6 km^{2}), of which 0.01 square miles (0.03 km^{2}), or 0.66%, are water. The city is 1 mile (1.6 km) southwest of the Dix River, a northwest-flowing tributary of the Kentucky River.

== Demographics ==
Historical population
Census	Pop.	Note	%±
1830	234		—
1860	364		—
1870	631		73.4%
1880	538		−14.7%
1890	453		−15.8%
1900	385		−15.0%
1910	467		21.3%
1920	493		5.6%
1930	576		16.8%
1940	705		22.4%
1950	757		7.4%
1960	808		6.7%
1970	861		6.6%
1980	843		−2.1%
1990	825		−2.1%
2000	842		2.1%
2010	841		−0.1%
2020	744		−11.5%
U.S. Decennial Census

As of the census of 2000, there were 842 people, 373 households, and 227 families residing in the city. The population density was 607.9 per square mile (234.7/km^{2}). There were 435 housing units at an average density of 314.1/sq mi (121.3/km^{2}). The racial makeup of the city was 97.15% White, 1.54% African American, 0.24% Native American, 0.24% from other races, and 0.83% from two or more races. Hispanic or Latino of any race were 0.59% of the population.

There were 373 households, out of which 29.5% had children under the age of 18 living with them, 42.4% were married couples living together, 12.9% had a female householder with no husband present, and 38.9% were non-families. 36.2% of all households were made up of individuals, and 21.7% had someone living alone who was 65 years of age or older. The average household size was 2.26 and the average family size was 2.93.

In the city, the population was spread out, with 25.9% under the age of 18, 8.4% from 18 to 24, 24.5% from 25 to 44, 20.8% from 45 to 64, and 20.4% who were 65 years of age or older. The median age was 37 years. For every 100 females, there were 89.2 males. For every 100 females age 18 and over, there were 77.3 males.

The median income for a household in the city was $21,184, and the median income for a family was $31,111. Males had a median income of $26,607 versus $18,889 for females. The per capita income for the city was $11,706. About 17.7% of families and 27.9% of the population were below the poverty line, including 35.1% of those under age 18 and 27.8% of those age 65 or over.

== Arts and culture ==
Crab Orchard was home to the Howard Theater. The William Whitley House State Historic Site lies just outside the city and, built sometime between 1787 and 1794, was the first brick house in Kentucky. The Confederate Monument at Crab Orchard commemorates the fallen Confederate soldiers of nearby states.

== Transportation ==
- U.S. Route 150 bypasses the southern and western edges of the city, leading northwest 11 miles (18 km) to Stanford and southeast 13 miles (21 km) to Mount Vernon.
- Kentucky Route 39 passes directly through the center of the city as Main Street, leading north 12 miles (19 km) to Lancaster and south 28 miles (45 km) to Somerset.

== Notable people ==
- Thomas L. Smith (1801–1866), mountain man who served as a guide for many early expeditions into the American Southwest and who helped explore parts of New Mexico
