= John Whitley (prison warden) =

American prison warden

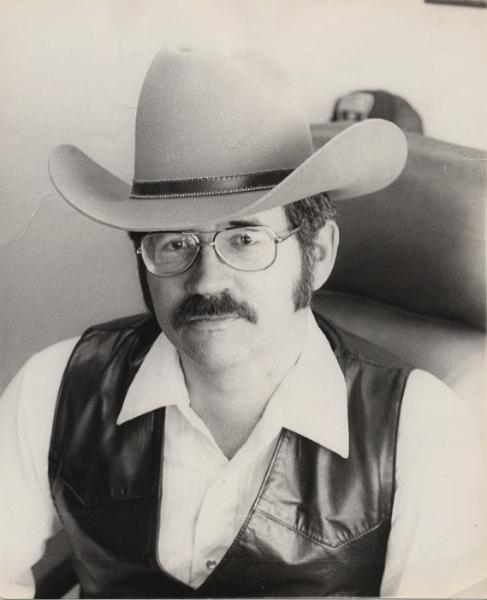
Warden John Whitley

John P. Whitley (born January 1944 in Hammond, Louisiana) is a former Louisiana corrections officer who served as the warden of Louisiana State Penitentiary (or Angola Prison), the largest maximum-security in the United States, from 1990 to 1995. Time magazine credited Warden Whitley with turning around hopelessness and violence at Angola with "little more than his sense of decency and fairness."

== Early life and education ==
John Whitley attended Southeastern Louisiana University in Hammond, Louisiana, and graduated in 1968. He enlisted in the United States Army that year, and served during the Vietnam War before his discharge in 1970. Shortly after, he began his career in corrections.

== Career ==
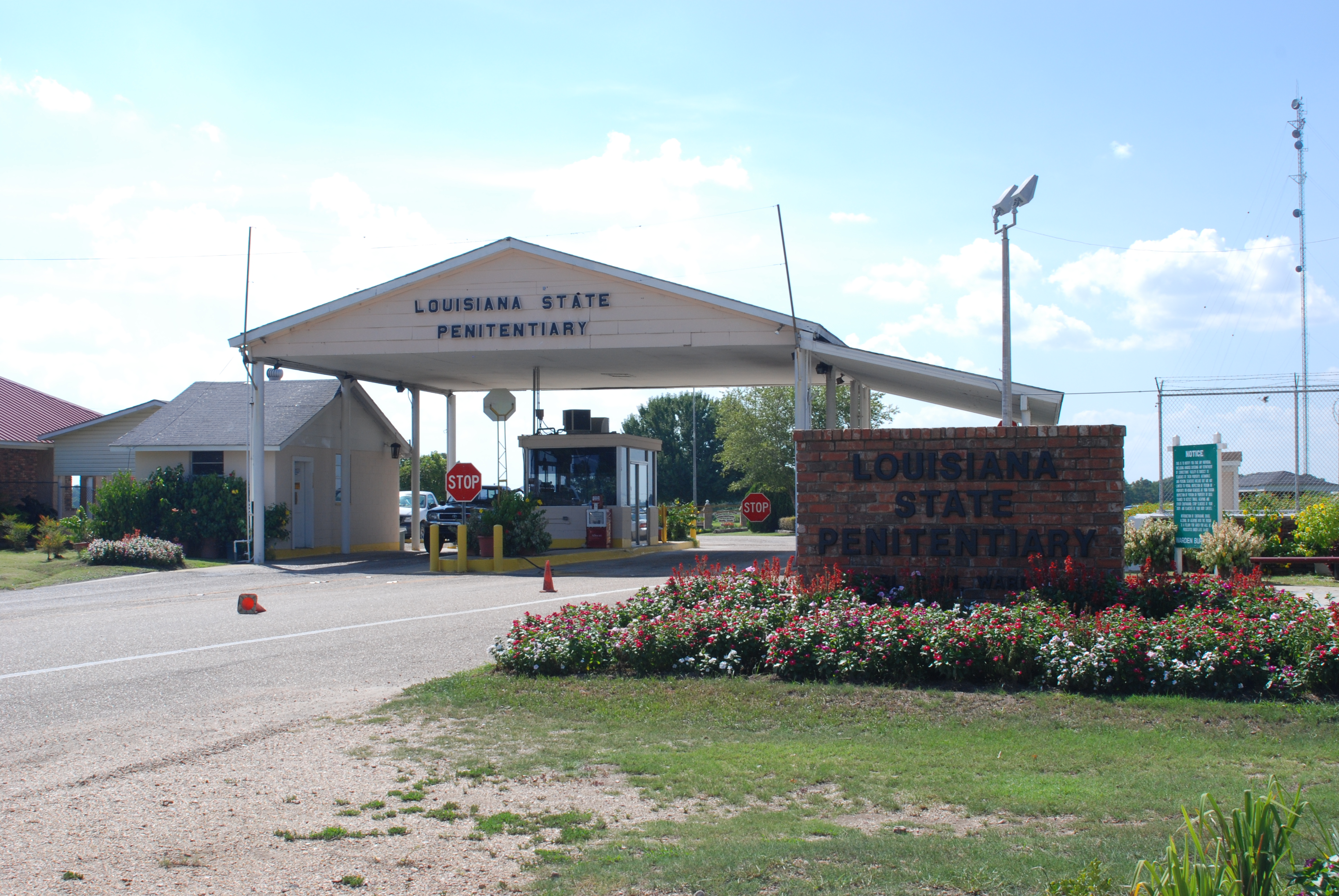
Louisiana State Penitentiary

Whitley started his career as a corrections officer at Angola in 1970. He rose through the ranks during the prison's most violent years, becoming Deputy Warden.

He was promoted to warden of another Louisiana prison, Hunt Correctional Center, and left the state to run a private prison in Texas. In 1990 Louisiana recruited him to return to Angola to restore order. At a time of frequent stabbings, suicides and escapes, a United States Federal Judge declared a state of emergency at the prison in response to an ACLU suit against the state for the horrendous conditions.

Within two years, Whitley had stemmed the violence. He established incentives for good behavior, such as extra visits, and increased educational opportunities with literacy tutoring, and computer and paralegal courses. He enabled some trustworthy and deserving inmates to travel outside the prison as part of athletic teams and inmate bands that provided entertainment for churches, nursing homes, and other charitable organizations.

Whitley launched an outreach program to all criminal justice programs in the State of Louisiana. He offered to send both prison officials and inmates to college classrooms to help both students and faculty better understand the realities of prison management and prison life.

== Philosophy ==
Like several Louisiana wardens before him, Whitley was committed to an open door policy with the media. He told editors of the inmate-produced newsmagazine, The Angolite, that he would continue the decades-long policy of lack of censorship. This had enabled the inmates to produce reporting on difficult issues and to win major national journalism awards for investigating problems at the prison.

He also said that he would continue to welcome outside media and cooperate with them: "We're not going to have anything to hide in Angola," he said. "And, if there's something that's wrong in the prison, I want to know about it, and my staff better correct it—because I intend to be proud of this prison and the way we operate it." Under Whitley, The Angolite began to produce material for uncensored radio and television journalism. Whitley believed these efforts were related to the prison's other outreach programs designed to educate the public about prison life and issues. As he explained to National Public Radio's Fresh Air host, Terry Gross, about his philosophy that lay behind the lack of censorship: "We want … different views of prison. Some of the views, I don't like. It upsets me sometimes, but it's true. We're looking for the truth."

== Challenge ==
In July 1991, inmate welders were ordered by a corrections department employee to build a "hospital examining table". They soon learned that it was a gurney to enable executions by lethal injection. This took place hours after an execution by electric chair had taken place. One of the welders had a brother who had been executed at the prison. Learning of these plans, hundreds of fellow inmates staged a work strike.

When Whitley learned what was happening, he locked up the strikers. He also brought in SWAT teams to prepare for the strike. But he also told the media that deceiving the inmate workers was wrong and the work order should never have been issued. He understood that it put the inmates in a bad position, and he was not going to subject them to building the lethal injection gurney. With that statement, he ended the strike without violence and gained the respect of both the inmate population and his security force.

Even the conservative Baton Rouge Morning Advocate commended him in two editorials for admitting the prison had erred and correcting the mistake. "It's refreshing to see a high-ranking government official admit mistakes and attempt to rectify them. It's a sign of integrity and responsibility." Time magazine invited Whitley to New York City to share his management philosophy with its corporate officers and editors, and profiled him in a three-page feature. He is the only American prison warden to be so profiled. The Russian language magazine, Amerika, followed suit with a six-page profile of Whitley.

== Accomplishments ==
Angola first earned accreditation from the American Correctional Association during Whitley's tenure. This was a concrete measure of the success of reforms he had enacted to increase the safety under which both inmates and employees live and work on the prison farm.

Having accomplished his goal of turning Angola into the safest maximum security in America, Whitley retired as warden in 1995. In what "may have been a first in the history of U. S. prisons," more than 100 inmate leaders pooled their money to throw Whitley a farewell party. It was attended by prison employees and officials, and covered by news media throughout Louisiana.

After leaving Angola, Whitley ran a private prison in Florida. He was called back to Louisiana to serve as the Court Expert for the U.S. Middle District Court of Louisiana. It continued to oversee the state's prisons compliance with a 1975 federal court order about conditions. He served in that position until 2003.

== Recognition ==
Whitley received numerous awards and honors during his tenure as Warden. Several of those were: Profile in "Time" Magazine, December 1992; Alumni of the Year" Southeastern Louisiana University 1993; Profile in "AMERICA", a Russian-Language Magazine, January 1994; Panelist, Time/Warner forum on Crime & Punishment - Feb. 1994; Profile by CBS News (Mike Wallace) - "In the Killing Fields of America" - Jan. 1995
