= James Whitley =

James Whitely may refer to:

- James Whitley (alpine skier) (born 1997), British Paralympic skier
- James Whitley (American football) (born 1979), American football player
- James Whitley (archaeologist), British archaeologist
- James L. Whitley (1872–1959), American politician

== See also ==
- Jim Whitley (born 1975), Northern Irish former footballer
