= Logan Trace =

Wilderness trail in Kentucky, USA

Coordinates: 37°29′36″N 84°34′36″W

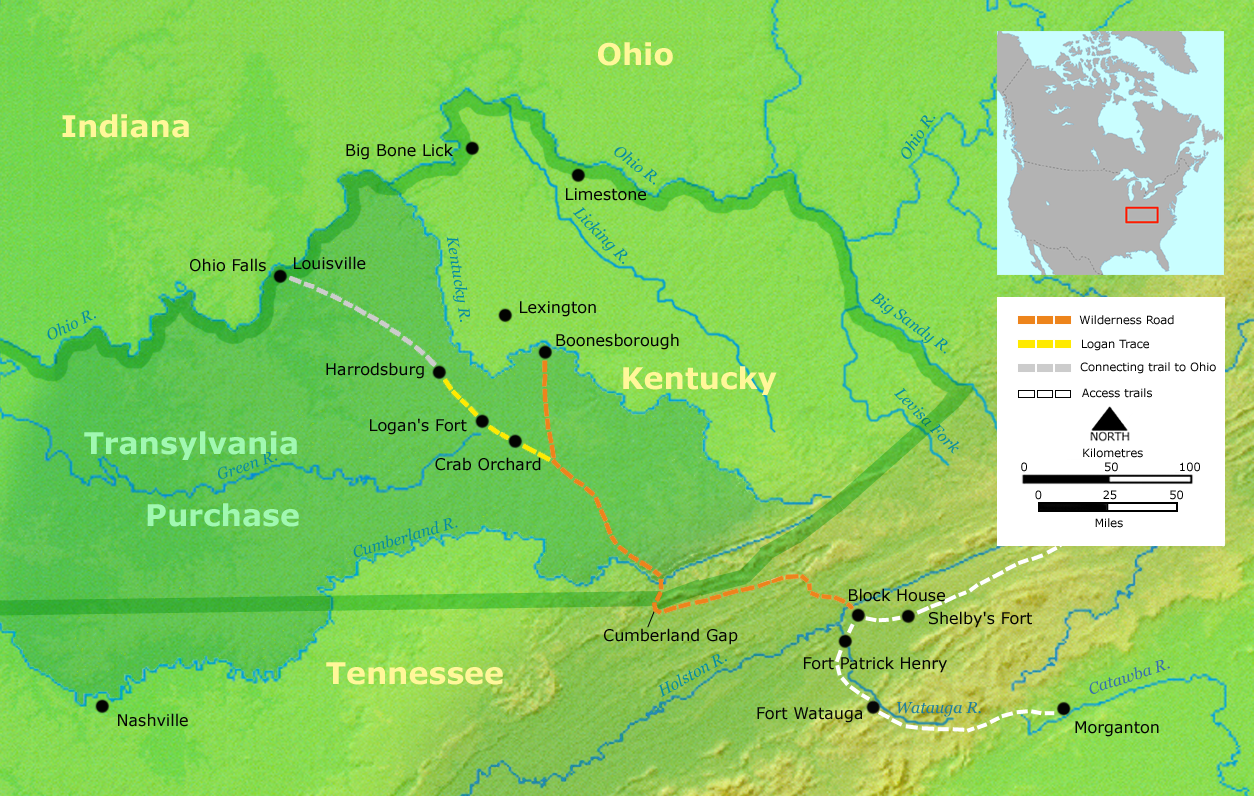
The Logan Trace (in yellow) and the Wilderness Road.

The Logan Trace was a wilderness trail through central Kentucky, a branch of Daniel Boone's Wilderness Road. It was named after its originator, Colonel Benjamin Logan. Logan came over the mountains with Boone in 1775, but went west toward Buffalo Spring instead of north. Its terminus was northwest of present-day Stanford, Kentucky, where Logan built a fort known as Logan's Station or St. Asaph. Stanford eventually emerged from Logan's original settlement.
