= International Book Project =

American educational organization

The International Book Project (IBP) is a registered 501 (c)(3) not-for-profit organization, founded by Harriet Van Meter in 1966, which has sent more than 7 million books abroad. Its mission is to promote education and literacy while broadening Americans' understanding of their neighbors, which it achieves by annually sending more than 300,000 books to schools, libraries, churches, and Peace Corps volunteers throughout the developing world and in the United States. The project is based in Lexington, Kentucky, in a warehouse it has owned since 1983.

== History ==
Harriet Drury Van Meter visited India in 1965 by invitation of the United States Department of State. While in India, she witnessed long lines of people waiting just to borrow a book to study from. She returned to Kentucky and placed an inquiry in the English-speaking Indian newspaper The Hindu, offering books. A large number of people responded, so Harriet Van Meter started sending books from her basement. In 1986, Harriet Van Meter was nominated for a Nobel Peace Prize for her efforts, and she was a finalist.

In 2006, Kentucky Educational Television aired the documentary Harriet Van Meter: A Life Extraordinary.

The International Book Project has sent over 7 million books worldwide since 1966. The organization celebrated its 50th anniversary in 2016.

== Mission ==
By providing needed quality books to the people of the developing world, the International Book Project seeks:

- To promote education and literacy in developing countries and in areas of need within the United States
- To broaden Americans' understanding of their neighbors, and
- To foster global friendships and strengthen world unity

== Shipping methods ==
IBP sends books in the following ways:

- Small Shipment – 35-pound boxes of books, which can be sent to anyone in the developing world with a postal address
- Pallet – A pallet typically contains 700–1,000 books. It is often sent to organizations that need more books than a small shipment can provide, but do not need or have funding for a sea container.
- Sea Container – 20' or 40' containers that travel by sea, containing 10,000–40,000 books and can stock a university library or provide textbooks for an entire school district.

=== Volunteer opportunities ===
IBP was started when volunteers started sending books from Mrs. Van Meter's basement, and IBP still needs help. IBP is a small organization, a staff of four, with just three full-time employees.

== Programs ==
=== Books Out ===
Books Out is a self-service program in which representatives from organizations abroad or in areas of need within the United States come to select books at the IBP warehouse and deliver them personally.

=== Books as Bridges ===
Books as Bridges is an international pen-pal program which partners Central Kentucky classrooms with classrooms in developing countries around the world. Through shared artwork and letters of participants, the program encourages students to develop higher reading levels, cultural awareness, and international friendships. By fostering international friendships, Books as Bridges hopes to spark a passion for social change among Central Kentucky youth.

The classrooms in Central Kentucky receive cultural lessons about their partner classrooms. In the developing world, the classrooms receive a box of books as an impetus to continue in the program.

== Peace Corps ==
IBP often sends books to Peace Corps Volunteers. In 1992, IBP was named "A Partner for Peace" by the US Peace Corps.
