= Lucy Harth Smith =

American political activist (1888–1955)

- Born: 1888; Roanoke, Virginia, U.S.
- Died: September 22, 1955 (aged 66–67)
- Occupation: Political activist

Lucy Harth Smith (1888 – September 22, 1955) was an educator, writer and activist who worked to challenge inequality in the Kentucky public school system. She was born in Roanoke, Virginia, and graduated from Hampton Institute. She taught in the Roanoke city school system from 1908 until 1910, when she moved to Lexington, Kentucky. She was the principal of Booker T. Washington Elementary School in Lexington, Kentucky for 37 years.

Smith was the second female president of the Kentucky Negro Education Association and was instrumental in having textbooks concerning black Americans placed in Kentucky's public schools. When a new school building was being remodeled she protested at the inclusion of a separate back entrance for black students. Her protest was successful and the entrance was placed at the front of the building.

Smith worked in her spare time to improve the lives of Kentucky's black children at a youth camp she founded in 1942. She also helped form the National Association of Colored Girls.
