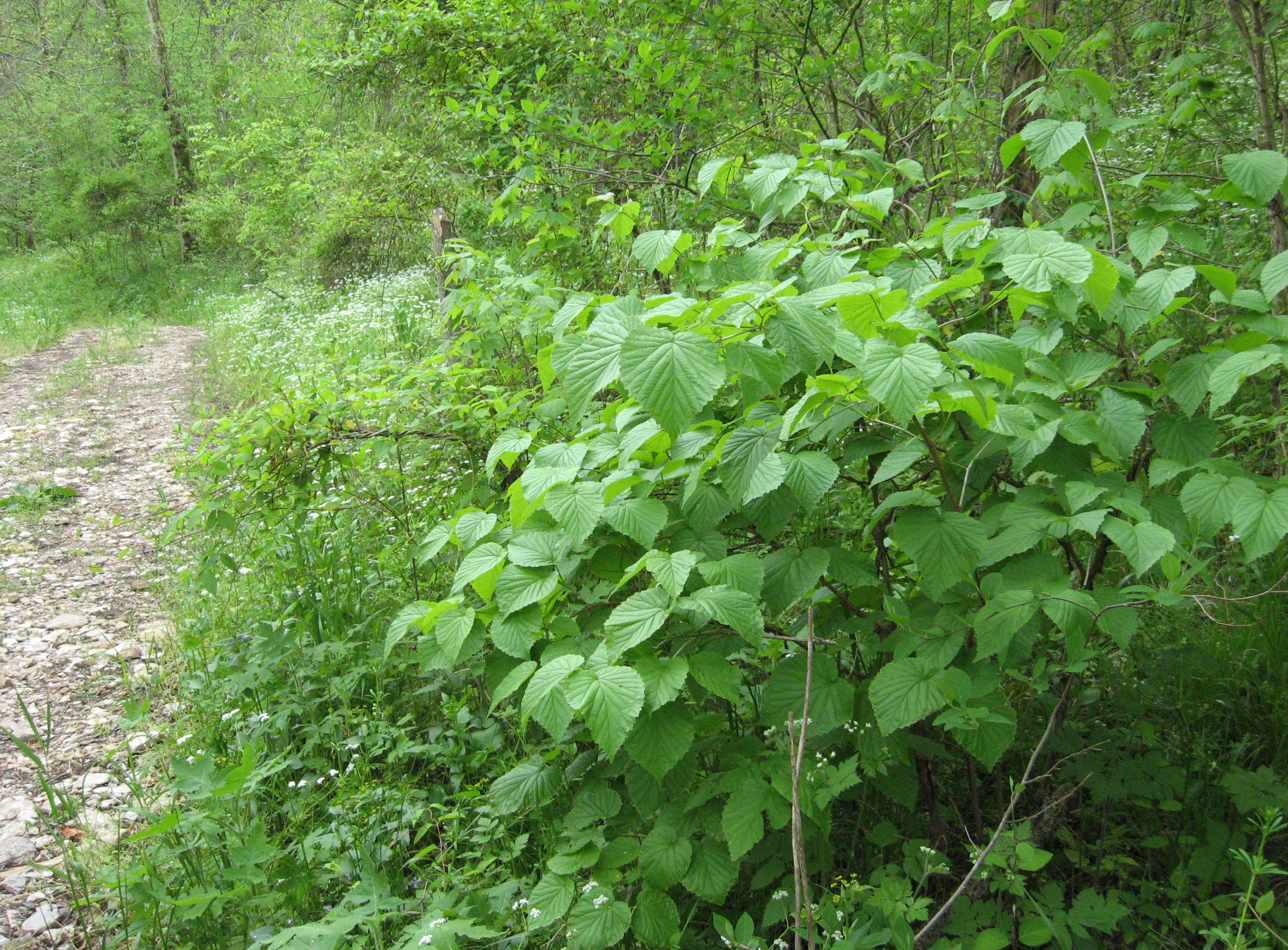

Scientific classification
- Kingdom: Plantae
- Clade: Embryophytes
- Clade: Tracheophytes
- Clade: Spermatophytes
- Clade: Angiosperms
- Clade: Eudicots
- Clade: Asterids
- Order: Dipsacales
- Family: Viburnaceae
- Genus: Viburnum
- Species: V. molle

Binomial name
- Viburnum molle Michx.

= Viburnum molle =

Species of flowering plant

Viburnum molle, commonly called softleaf arrowwood, is a species of flowering plant in the family Viburnaceae. It is native to the eastern United States, where it restricted to the Midwest and Upper South. Its distribution is scattered, and populations occur in disjunct clusters. Its natural habitat is in rocky bluff forests over calcareous soil, and in adjacent bottomlands.

Viburnum molle is a woody shrub that spreads by underground runners. It produces clusters of small white flowers in late spring. It has distinctive papery bark which peels off in sheets. Although it bears a superficial resemblance to the more widespread Viburnum dentatum, it can be distinguished by its ovate-orbicular leaves with strictly cordate leaf bases, its prominent long-filiform stipules, and its ellipsoid fruit.
