= William Whitley =

American pioneer and politician

William Whitley (August 4, 1749 – October 5, 1813), was an American pioneer in what became Kentucky, in the colonial and early Federal period. Born in Virginia, he was the son of Scottish Presbyterian immigrants from northern Ireland, then the Ulster Plantation. He was important to the early settlement of the U.S. Commonwealth of Kentucky, where he moved with his family from Virginia. He served with the Kentucky militia during the Northwest Indian War.

He was married and his eleven children lived to adulthood, settling as far West as Oregon. At the age of 64, Whitley signed up to serve in the War of 1812. He was killed in Canada at the Battle of the Thames; some accounts credit him with killing Tecumseh, a Shawnee leader allied with the British.

== Early life and family ==
William Whitley was the son of Solomon Whitley and Elizabeth Barnett, Presbyterian Scottish or Scots-Irish immigrants from Carrickfergus, Ireland (in what is today Northern Ireland and was then the Ulster Plantation) who settled in Augusta County, Virginia. He was the oldest of four sons and is thought to have had five sisters as well.

About 1771 or as late as 1775, Whitley married Esther Fullen, also from Virginia. A few years later, he proposed that they move from Virginia to the western frontier across the Appalachian Mountains. When she approved, he organized an expedition with his brother-in-law, George Clark.^{[b]} The pair met another party of seven pioneers; the two parties combined and continued with their expedition. After scouting a location near a branch of the Dix River called Cedar Creek, they returned to Virginia to prepare for a permanent move west.

The families left Virginia in November 1775, shortly before the beginning of the American Revolutionary War. When they reached their new site, Whitley planted 10 acres (40,000 m^{2}) of corn to establish his claim to the land. He and his family moved to the safety of St. Asaph's fort (present-day Stanford, Kentucky), as the local Shawnee and Cherokee resisted European-American encroachment in their territory. In 1763, the British had promised the Native Americans that this area west of the mountains would be a reserve for them and prohibited to colonists.

Not feeling safe, the Whitley and Benjamin Logan families moved to the protection of Fort Harrod, near present-day Harrodsburg, Kentucky. In this period, Whitley saw the body of William Ray, who he said had been scalped by Native Americans. Many years later, when dictating his memoir to his son-in-law, Phillip Soublett, Whitley said that Ray's body was the first he had seen scalped. He was horrified and considered the Native people brutal for what he considered mutilation. During the Revolutionary War in 1779, Whitley discovered the mutilated bodies of the Starnes family near Blue Lick (south of Boonesborough, Kentucky) and documented the find. There was continued warfare with Cherokee in the region during the revolution.

== Military career ==
After the Revolutionary War, Whitley volunteered for service in George Rogers Clark's expedition against Indians in the Northwest Territory. He was assigned to Captain John Montgomery's Company, which accompanied Clark's forces. During his military career, Whitley was known to scalp many natives as a militia leader and frontiersman. By 1779, Whitley had returned for his family and permanently settled on the land he had claimed years earlier in what is now Kentucky.

By the 1790s, the settlement at St. Asaph's developed into the town of Stanford. Whitley and his family built a large brick house outside town, near what would later become Crab Orchard, Kentucky. The plantation was named Sportsman's Hill. It was the first brick house built in Kentucky and still stands, preserved as the William Whitley House State Historic Site. The house includes a secret passage for escape and survival during raids by Native Americans. The plantation originally included a racetrack. This racetrack set several traditions for horse racing in the United States. It had the first clay (instead of turf) track in the United States and here horses were raced counterclockwise (instead of clockwise, as was the British tradition).

In 1792, Isaac Shelby, the newly elected governor of Kentucky, commissioned Whitley as a major in the 6th Regiment of the Kentucky militia. He was promoted to lieutenant colonel the following year. In 1794, he led 200 militiamen in a highly successful raid against a Chickamauga village in Tennessee. The Chickamauga were a band of Cherokee, referred to by the geographic area where they lived.

In 1813, at the age of 64, Whitley returned to military service. He volunteered in the Kentucky Mounted Infantry during the War of 1812 with Great Britain. In the Battle of the Thames, on October 5, 1813, he led the "Forlorn Hope" charge against Tecumseh's forces. Both Tecumseh and Whitley were killed in the battle. Whitley was buried near the battleground, in Chatham, Ontario. Militia colleagues returned his horse, Emperor, his powder horn, strap, and rifle to his wife in Kentucky after the war. The rifle is currently on display at the William Whitley House State Historic Site.

Some primary accounts suggest that Whitley was likely the person who killed Tecumseh. Richard Mentor Johnson is generally credited with killing the Shawnee leader. James A Drain Sr. published an autobiography, Single Handed (1927), in which he recounts Whitley's granddaughter telling their family tradition that Whitley and Tecumseh killed each other simultaneously.

== Political career ==
In 1797, Whitley served a single term in the Kentucky House of Representatives. He also represented Lincoln County as a commissioner of the Kentucky River Company in 1801.

== Legacy and honors ==
- In 1818, Whitley County, Kentucky, and its county seat, Williamsburg, were named for the colonel.
- A plaque on the Whitley County Courthouse credits Colonel Whitley with killing the last Indian (probably Cherokee) in the county.
- In addition, the census-designated place Whitley City, Kentucky, is named after the colonel.
- In 1838, Whitley County, Indiana, was named after him.
- One of his grandsons was William L. Sublette, a fur trader who became co-owner of the Rocky Mountain Fur Company with Jedediah Smith and David Edward Jackson. Sublette was a member of the original fur-trapping expedition known as Ashley's Hundred.
- The 20th-century Andromeda-class attack cargo ship USS Whitley was named for the Whitley counties in Kentucky and Indiana.

== Family ==
William and Esther Whitley had eleven children, all of whom survived to maturity.

These were:

1. Elizabeth (Mrs. Robert Stevenson) b Augusta, Virginia, 1772, d Huntsville, Alabama, 1830.
2. Isabella (Mrs. Phillip Sublette), b Virginia, about 1774, d Kentucky about 1820. Phillip and Isabella's first-born son, William, was notable as a mountain man and fur trader, known as Bill Sublette. Areas of Wyoming were named for him.
3. Levisa (Mrs. James McKinney), b Harrodsburg, KY, February 24, 1777. Moved to Missouri.
4. Solomon, b Kentucky 1770, moved to Missouri.
5. William, b Kentucky, Apr 20. 1782 - d Lincoln Co., KY, August 23, 1849.
6. Andrew, b Kentucky 1784 - d Lincoln Co. 1844.
7. Esther (Mrs. Samuel Lewis), b 1786 - d Woodford Co., KY 1815.
8. Mary (called Polly), (Mrs. James Gilmour), b Kentucky 1788, moved to Illinois; later to Colorado and Oregon.
9. Nancy (Mrs. John Owlsey), b 1790 - d prior to 1820 near Crab Orchard., KY
10. Sally (Mrs. Henley Middleton), b 1792 - d 1845 near Crab Orchard.
11. Ann (Mrs. William Harper), b 1795 - d Woodford Co., KY after 1870

Esther Whitley died at the home of her daughter, Ann Harper, in Woodford County, Kentucky, November 20, 1833.

== Representation in other media ==
- Since 2006, Whitley has been portrayed by Matt Bryant of Mount Vernon, Kentucky at the William Whitley House State Historic Park and elsewhere. Bryant also played the role of Whitley in the film William Whitley: Guardian of the Kentucky Road. It was which was produced by That's Just Muggs Productions.

== Notes ==
- ^[a] The Biographical Cyclopedia gives the name as Esther Fuller and the marriage date as 1775.
- ^[b] The Biographical Cyclopedia gives the name as George Clark.
