= Kentucky River Palisades =

Coordinates: 37.765°N 84.627°W

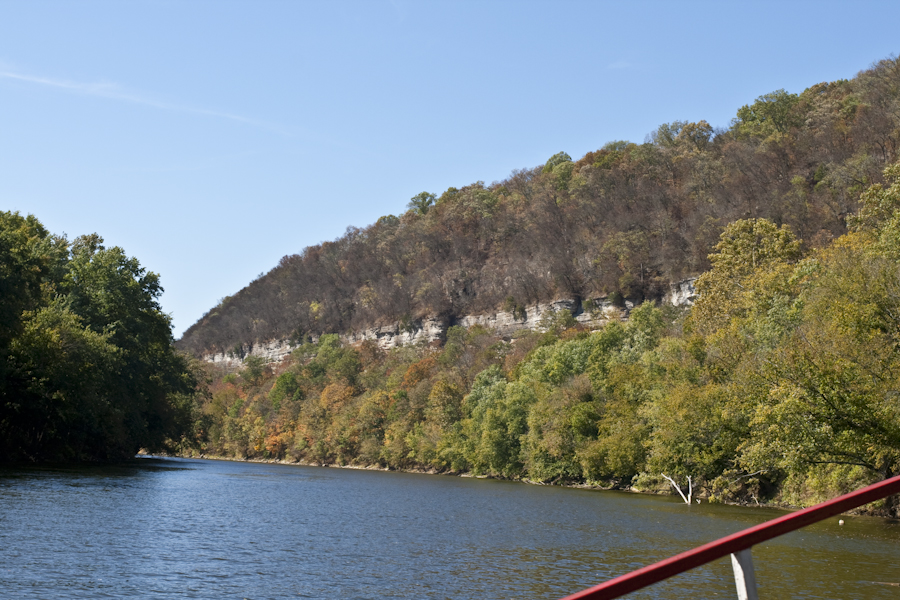
The Kentucky River Palisades, 2008

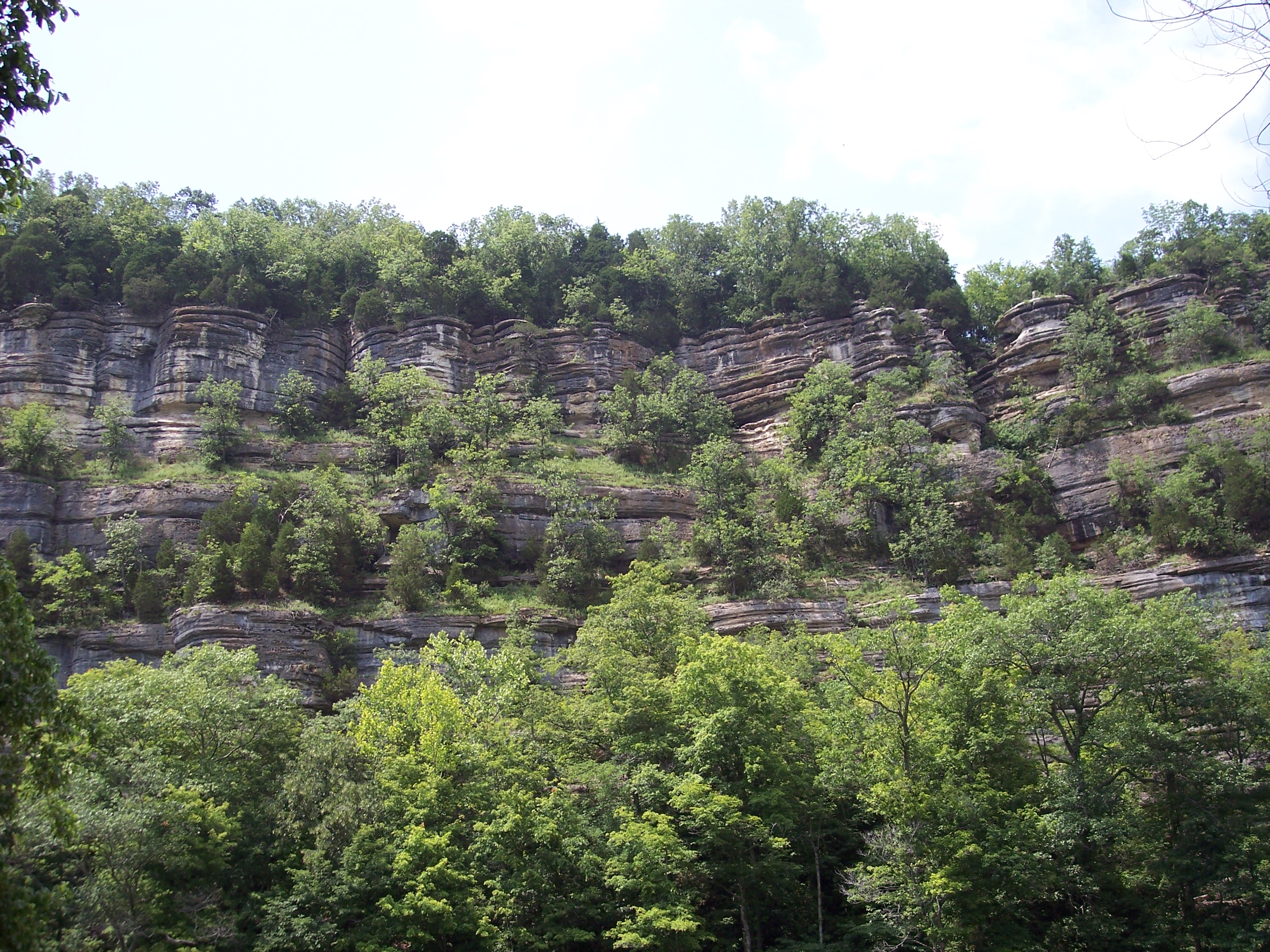
Vantage point from Tom Dorman Nature Preserve

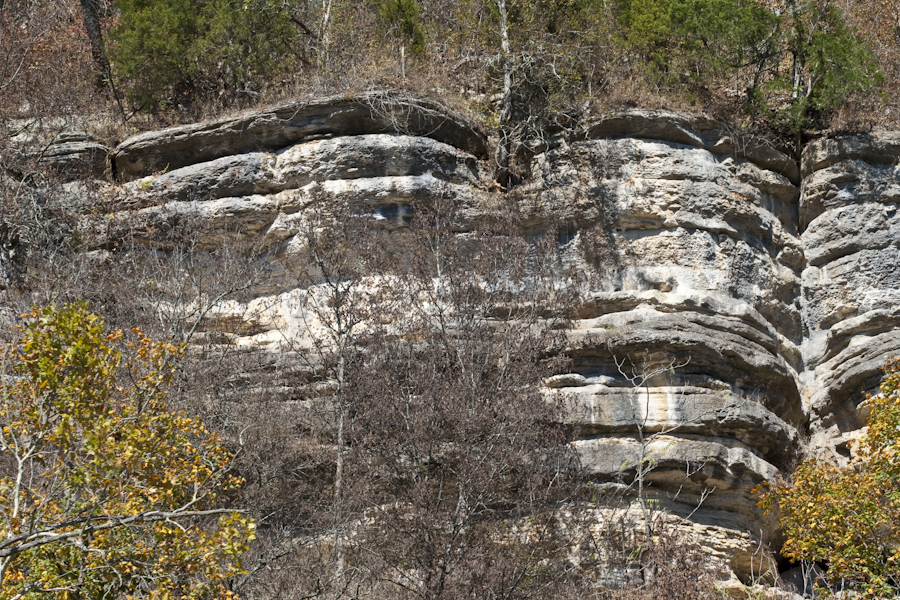
Close up of sedimentary layers of the Kentucky River Palisades

The Kentucky River Palisades are a series of steep, scenic gorges and limestone outcroppings that stretch for approximately 100 miles (160 km) along the Kentucky River in central Kentucky in the United States.

== Geology ==
The Kentucky River Palisades is a cliff-lined entrenched meander. The meanders originally formed on the Lexington Peneplain. As sea-level lowered during the Quaternary Period, base level lowered and the meander-form river eroded downward into Ordovician-age limestones, shales, and dolomites in the Central Bluegrass Region. The Lexington Limestone, which covers most of this area, is composed of interbedded shales and thin limestones. Erosion of these lithologies usually form gentle to moderate slopes. However, the Kentucky River Fault system, part of which runs along the Palisades, provides another controlling factor. Movement along the fault has been largely vertical. Strata on the north side of the fault were raised several hundred feet relative to those on the south side. The thick dolomites and limestones of the High Bridge Group (Tyrone, Oregon, and Camp Nelson formations) are resistant to erosion and tend to be cliff-forming. As downward erosion hit the Camp Nelson Group rocks, meander-shaped cliffs were formed. Daniel Boone's Fort Boonesborough was sited close to the fault and the eastern end of the Palisades.

== Ecology ==
The Palisades are considered by environmentalists to form a unique ecosystem in the region. Its topography, soil, and tree composition are different from the surrounding rolling plains. The display of spring ephemeral wildflowers is especially extravagant due to the rich limestone soils. The deep cliffs provide a habitat for four species of endangered bats as well as several rare and endangered plant species. The steep cliffs surrounding the Kentucky River harbor the largest concentration of forest within the Inner Bluegrass, which is otherwise developed or cleared. Blue ash (Fraxinus quadrangulata), chinquapin oak (Quercus muehlenbergii) and sugar maple (Acer saccharum) are abundant on the steep limestone slopes, along with less common trees like rock elm (Ulmus thomasi), yellowwood (Cladrastis lutea) and yellow buckeye (Aesculus octandra). Sites on old sandy river terraces and bluff-top ridges have more acid or infertile soils and harbor beech (Fagus) and tulip poplar (Liriodendron tulipifera) trees more common in Appalachian Kentucky. Other uncommon woody species found in the Palisades include Paxistima, Chokecherry, and various types of Viburnums.

== Nature preserves ==
- Clyde E. Buckley Wildlife Sanctuary
- Crutcher and Sally Brown
- Floracliff (by guided hike only)
- Jim Beam
- Dupree
- Lower Howard's Creek
- Raven Run
- Tom Dorman State Nature Preserve

In 2007 the Kentucky State Parks announced the purchase of 90 acres (360,000 m^{2}) adjacent to Tom Dorman State Nature Preserve for the creation of the new Palisades State Park.
