= U.S. Route 150 in Kentucky =

Section of U.S. Numbered Highway in Kentucky, United States

U.S. Route 150
- US 150 highlighted in red

Route information
- Maintained by KYTC
- Length: 121.097 mi (194.887 km)
- Existed: 1934–present

Major junctions
- West end: I-64 / US 150 in Louisville
- I-264 in Louisville; I-64 in Louisville; US 31W / US 60 in Louisville; I-65 in Louisville; US 31E in Louisville; I-264 in Louisville; I-265 in Louisville; US 31E / US 62 in Bardstown; US 68 in Perryville; US 27 in Stanford
- East end: US 25 / KY 1249 in Mount Vernon

Location
- Country: United States
- State: Kentucky
- Counties: Jefferson, Bullitt, Spencer, Nelson, Washington, Boyle, Lincoln, Rockcastle

Highway system
- United States Numbered Highway System; List; Special; Divided; Kentucky State Highway System; Interstate; US; State; Parkways
← KY 149	→ KY 151

U.S. Route 150 (US 150) in Kentucky is a 121.097-mile-long (194.887 km) east–west highway that runs from the Indiana state line above the Ohio River to US 25/KY 1249 at Mount Vernon.

== Route description ==
=== Louisville/Jefferson County ===
Starting on the Sherman Minton Bridge over the Ohio River, I-64 and US 150 enter the city of Louisville. Shortly after going through the bridge, both routes encounter I-264 at a directional T interchange. The freeway continues as an elevated freeway along the riverfront, passing the nearby McAlpine Locks and Dam. On the next exit, US 150 leaves the freeway and enters onto 22nd Street. The route runs through the neighborhood of Portland and Russell along this street. South of Griffiths Avenue, US 150 splits into a one-way pair, with eastbound traffic continuing to use 22nd Street and westbound traffic using Dr. W. J. Hodge (21st) Street and 22nd Street Connector. South of Main Street and Market Street, US 150 runs concurrently with US 31W and US 60. US 150 then turns eastward along Broadway, departing from US 31W/US 60.

In downtown, US 150 encounters I-65 between 1st Street and Brook Street. However, there are no direct connections to northbound and from southbound I-65. Just west of the Cave Hill Cemetery, US 150 turns southeast along US 31E (Baxter Avenue). Both routes soon turn southeast on Bardstown Road. The two routes then serve Strathmoor Manor, Strathmoor Village, Wellington, I-264 (Watterson Expressway), West Buechel, and I-265/KY 841 (Gene Snyder Freeway). South of I-265, the road becomes a four-lane divided roadway. The road reaches the city limit of Louisville shortly after intersecting with KY 660.

=== Mount Washington to Mount Vernon ===
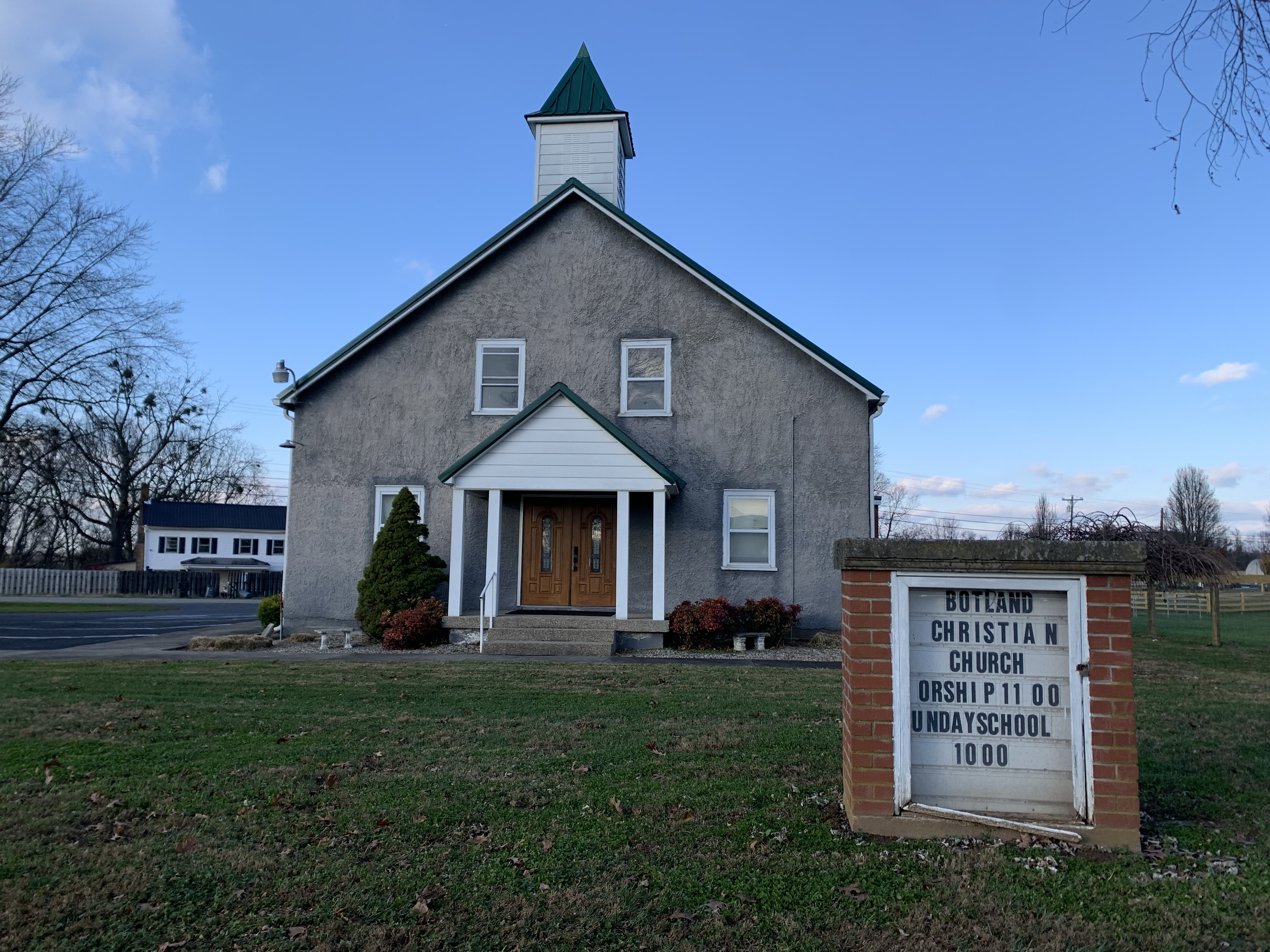
Botland Christian Church in Nelson County along US 150

After leaving Louisville and Jefferson County, US 31E/US 150 begins to bypass downtown Mount Washington. Just before intersecting with KY 44, the road downgrades to a four-lane undivided highway. Shortly thereafter, it then downgrades to two lanes. The two routes then serve Coxs Creek, and Nazareth. In Bardstown, both US 31E and US 150 split at a roundabout. At the same intersection, US 150 begins running concurrently with US 62 for around 1/2 mile (0.80 km). Then, US 150 meets the Bluegrass Parkway (BG 9002) at a diamond interchange. The route then serves Fredericktown, St. Catharine, Springfield, and Texas. In Perryville, the route runs concurrently with US 68 for less than two blocks. KY 52 also begins to run concurrently with US 150.

In Danville, US 150 and KY 52 intersect US 127 Byp./US 150 Byp. (Danville Bypass). As both routes approach downtown, KY 34 and later US 127 briefly join in. After leaving downtown, KY 52 leaves US 150. After that, US 150 then enters onto a four-lane divided highway. This configuration is a continuation of the Danville Bypass. In Stanford, the route intersects with US 27 before returning to a two-lane undivided road. The route then serves Crab Orchard and Brodhead. In Mount Vernon, US 150 intersects with US 25/KY 1249. At this point, US 150 ends here.

== Major intersections ==
County	Location	mi	km	Exit	Destinations	Notes
Ohio River		0.000	0.000		I-64 west / US 150 west – New Albany, St. Louis	Continuation into Indiana
Ohio River		0.000	0.000	Sherman Minton Bridge		
Jefferson	Louisville	0.818	1.316	1	I-264 east – Shively	I-64 exit 1; I-264 exit 0
Jefferson	Louisville	2.704	4.352		I-64 east – Lexington	Eastern end of I-64 overlap; US 150 east follows exit 3
Jefferson	Louisville	2.829	4.553		KY 3064 west (Portland Avenue)	Eastern terminus of unsigned KY 3064; one-way westbound only
Jefferson	Louisville	2.954	4.754		KY 3082 (Bank Street)	Eastern terminus of unsigned KY 3082; KY 3082 is one-way eastbound onto US 150 only
Jefferson	Louisville	3.444	5.543		US 31W north / US 60 east (West Market Street)	Western end of US 31W / US 60 overlap
Jefferson	Louisville	4.134	6.653		US 31W south / US 60 west (South 22nd Street)	Eastern end of US 31W / US 60 overlap
Jefferson	Louisville	5.869	9.445		KY 1020 south (South Third Street)	
Jefferson	Louisville	5.954	9.582		KY 1020 north (South Second Street)	
Jefferson	Louisville	6.101	9.819		I-65 south – Nashville	No direct access to northbound and from southbound I-65
Jefferson	Louisville	6.359	10.234		KY 61 south (South Preston Street)	
Jefferson	Louisville	6.469	10.411		KY 61 north (South Jackson Street)	
Jefferson	Louisville	6.799	10.942		KY 864 south (South Shelby Street)	
Jefferson	Louisville	6.909	11.119		KY 864 north (South Campbell Street)	
Jefferson	Louisville	7.488	12.051		US 31E north (Baxter Avenue)	Western end of US 31E overlap
Jefferson	Louisville	7.736	12.450		KY 1703 south (Baxter Avenue)	Northern terminus of KY 1703
Jefferson	Louisville	7.966	12.820		KY 2860 (Grinstead Drive)	
Jefferson	Louisville	8.763	14.103		US 60 Alt. (Eastern Parkway)	
Jefferson	Louisville	10.263	16.517		KY 155 south (Taylorsville Road)	Northern terminus of KY 155
Jefferson	Louisville	11.345	18.258		I-264 (Watterson Expressway)	I-264 exit 16
Jefferson	Louisville	12.238	19.695		Bardstown Road (KY 2251 south) - Buechel Business District	Northern terminus of unsigned KY 2251
Jefferson	Louisville	12.415	19.980		Hikes Lane (KY 2052 south)	Northern terminus of unsigned KY 2052
Jefferson	Louisville				Progress Boulevard	Interchange
Jefferson	Louisville	13.488	21.707		Bardstown Road (KY 2251 north) - Buechel Business District	Southern terminus of unsigned KY 2251
Jefferson	Louisville	14.695	23.649		KY 1932 north (Breckenridge Lane)	Southern terminus of KY 1932
Jefferson	Louisville	16.144	25.981		KY 1747 (South Hurstbourne Parkway)	
Jefferson	Louisville	17.828	28.691		KY 1065 (Beulah Church Road / Seatonville Road)	
Jefferson	Louisville	18.317– 18.618	29.478– 29.963		I-265 (Gene Snyder Freeway)	I-265 exit 7
Jefferson	Louisville	21.467	34.548		KY 2053 west (Thixton Lane)	Eastern terminus of KY 2053
Jefferson	Louisville	23.32	37.53		KY 660 east (Waterford Road)	Western terminus of KY 660
Bullitt		23.688	38.122		US 31EX south – Mount Washington Business District	Northern terminus of US 31EX
Bullitt	Mount Washington	25.257	40.647		KY 44 – Mount Washington Business District	
Bullitt	Mount Washington	25.93	41.73		US 31EX north	Southern terminus of US 31EX
Bullitt		27.759	44.674		KY 2674 north	Southern terminus of KY 2674
Spencer	No major junctions					
Nelson	Highgrove	31.646	50.929		KY 48 east – Fairfield, Bloomfield	Western terminus of KY 48
Nelson		32.547	52.379		KY 480 west	Eastern terminus of KY 480
Nelson		33.5	53.9		KY 523	
Nelson	Coxs Creek	37.923	61.031		KY 509 – Fairfield	
Nelson	Bardstown	41.73	67.16		KY 332 (Old Nazareth Road)	
Nelson	Bardstown	43.059	69.297		KY 245 / US 31E Truck south / US 150 Truck east to I-65 / Bluegrass Parkway	Northern terminus of US 31E Truck; western terminus of US 150 Truck
Nelson	Bardstown	43.847	70.565		KY 1430 west (West Beall Avenue)	Eastern terminus of KY 1430
Nelson	Bardstown	44.264	71.236		US 31E south / US 62 west (West Stephen Foster Avenue) to Bluegrass Parkway west – Airport	Eastern end of US 31E overlap; western end of US 62 overlap; traffic circle around Old Courthouse Building
Nelson	Bardstown	44.206	71.143		US 62 east (Bloomfield Road) – Bloomfield	Eastern end of US 62 overlap
Nelson	Bardstown	44.646	71.851		KY 49 south – Loretto	
Nelson	Bardstown	45.903	73.874		KY 245 north / US 31E Truck north / US 150 Truck west	Western end of US 31E Truck overlap
Nelson	Bardstown	46.155	74.279		Bluegrass Parkway / US 31E Truck south – Lexington, Elizabethtown	Bluegrass Parkway exit 25; eastern end of US 31E Truck overlap
Nelson		48.065	77.353		KY 605 north	Western end of KY 605 overlap
Nelson	Botland	48.939	78.760		KY 605 south	Eastern end of KY 605 overlap
Washington	Fredericktown	52.372	84.285		KY 1872 (Fredricktown Road)	
Washington		55.969	90.073		KY 1030 (Bearwallow Road)	
Washington		57.068	91.842		KY 1724 (Cartwright Road)	
Washington		58.416	94.011		US 150 Bus. east – St. Catharine, Springfield	
Washington		59.684	96.052		KY 55 – Bloomfield	
Washington		60.174	96.841		KY 528 – Springfield, Lincoln Homestead State Park	
Washington	Springfield	61.044	98.241		KY 555 to Bluegrass Parkway – Springfield, Lebanon	
Washington		61.158	98.424		KY 1584	
Washington		62.309	100.277		KY 152 – Mackville, Springfield	
Washington		62.959	101.323		US 150 Bus. west – Springfield	
Washington	Rineltown	65.721	105.768		KY 2758 (Simmstown Road)	
Washington		66.544	107.092		KY 1195 (Short Line Road)	
Washington		72.144	116.105		KY 442 north	
Boyle	Perryville	77.073	124.037		KY 1920 west (Jackson Street) – Perryville Battlefield State Historic Site	
Boyle	Perryville	77.149	124.159		US 68 west / KY 52 west	Western end of US 68 / KY 52 overlap
Boyle	Perryville	77.258	124.335		US 68 east / KY 1856 south (Bragg Street)	Eastern end of US 68 overlap
Boyle		80.897	130.191		KY 1822 north (Quirks Run Road)	Western end of KY 1822 overlap
Boyle	Needmore	81.436	131.059		KY 1822 south (Parksville Cross Pike)	Eastern end of KY 1822 overlap
Boyle	Danville	84.907	136.645		KY 3366 north (Bluegrass Pike)	
Boyle	Danville	85.35	137.36		US 127 Byp. / US 150 Byp. east	
Boyle	Danville	86.268	138.835		KY 34 west (Lebanon Road)	Western end of KY 34 overlap
Boyle	Danville	86.532	139.260		US 127 north (Maple Avenue)	Western end of US 127 overlap
Boyle	Danville	86.986	139.990		US 127 south (South 4th Street)	Eastern end of US 127 south overlap (eastbound)
Boyle	Danville	87.108	140.187		KY 33 north (North 3rd Street)	Eastern end of US 127 north overlap (westbound)
Boyle	Danville	87.44	140.72		KY 34 east (Old Wilderness Road)	Eastern end of KY 34 overlap
Boyle	Danville	88.701	142.750		KY 52 east (Lancaster Road)	Eastern end of KY 52 overlap
Boyle		90.041	144.907		US 150 Byp. west	
Boyle		91.169	146.722		KY 1273 east (Chrisman Lane)	Western end of KY 1273 overlap
Boyle		92.077	148.184		KY 1273 west (Airport Road)	Eastern end of KY 1273 overlap
Lincoln		94.626	152.286		KY 3248 – Hubble	
Lincoln	Stanford	96.452	155.224		KY 300	
Lincoln	Stanford	97.572	157.027		US 27 – Lancaster, Stanford	
Lincoln		99.974	160.893		KY 78 – Stanford	
Lincoln		100.234	161.311		KY 1770 (Old US 150)	
Lincoln		106.045	170.663		KY 1369 – William Whitley House State Historic Site	
Lincoln		106.632	171.608		KY 2750 – Crab Orchard	
Lincoln		107.534	173.059		KY 643	
Lincoln		108.536	174.672		KY 39 – Crab Orchard	
Lincoln		110.55	177.91		KY 2750 (Copper Creek Road)	Western end of KY 2750 overlap
Lincoln		110.86	178.41		KY 2750	Eastern end of KY 2750 overlap
Rockcastle		112.752	181.457		Fort Harrod Way	Former KY 2750
Rockcastle		113.273	182.295		KY 2250 (West Main Street) – Brodhead	
Rockcastle		114.837	184.812		KY 2250 (East Main Street) / KY 3245 – Brodhead	
Rockcastle		115.209	185.411		KY 1229 (Dug Hill Road)	
Rockcastle		115.72	186.23		KY 70 west	
Rockcastle		116.481	187.458		KY 1250 (Spiro Road)	
Rockcastle	Maretburg	118.391	190.532		KY 2108 (Maretburg Road)	
Rockcastle		119.282	191.966		KY 461 to I-75 – Renfro Valley, Berea, Somerset	
Rockcastle		120.011	193.139		KY 2549 (White Rock Road)	
Rockcastle	Mount Vernon	121.097	194.887		US 25 / KY 1249 – London, Berea	Eastern terminus of US 150
1.000 mi = 1.609 km; 1.000 km = 0.621 mi: Concurrency terminus; Incomplete access

U.S. Route 150
Previous state: Indiana	Kentucky	Next state: Terminus
