= U.S. Route 150 =

Highway in the Midwestern United States

U.S. Route 150
- US 150 highlighted in red

Route information
- Auxiliary route of US 50
- Length: 571 mi (919 km)
- Existed: 1926–present

Major junctions
- West end: US 6 in Moline, IL
- I-55 in Bloomington, IL; I-57 in Champaign, IL; I-74 in Danville, IL; I-70 in Terre Haute, IN; I-69 in Washington, IN; I-64 / SR 62 in New Albany, IN; I-264 in Louisville, KY; I-65 in Louisville, KY; I-264 near Wellington, KY; I-265 in Fern Creek, KY
- East end: US 25 / KY 1249 in Mount Vernon, KY

Location
- Country: United States
- States: Illinois, Indiana, Kentucky

Highway system
- United States Numbered Highway System; List; Special; Divided

U.S. Route 150 (US 150) is a 571-mile (919 km) long northwest–southeast United States highway, signed as east–west. It runs from U.S. Route 6 outside of Moline, Illinois, to U.S. Route 25 in Mount Vernon, Kentucky.

== Route description ==
=== Illinois ===
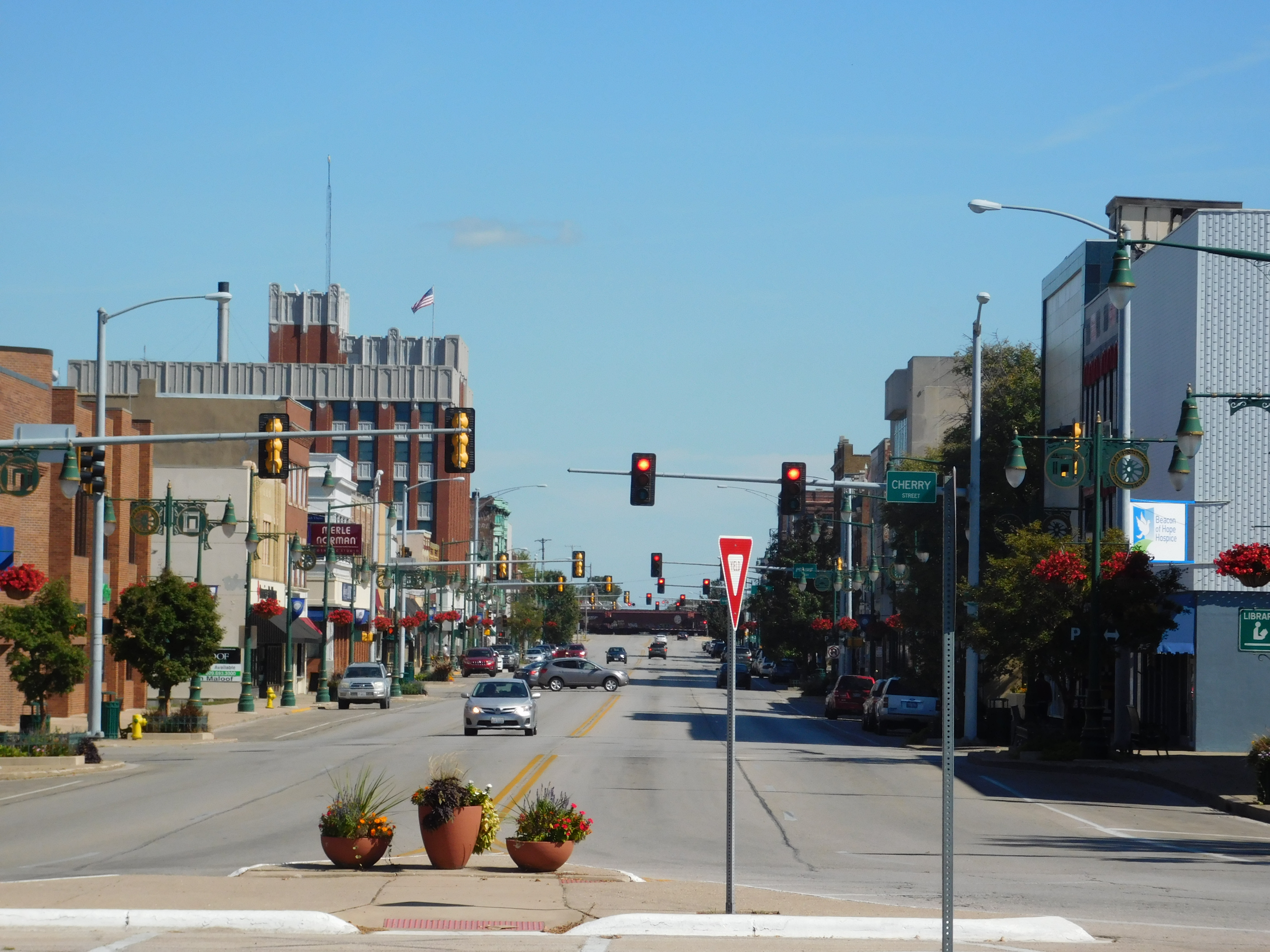
US 150 through downtown Galesburg

In the state of Illinois, U.S. 150 runs from the Quad Cities International Airport at U.S. Route 6 southeast to near Vermilion. U.S. 150 in Illinois is 267.47 miles (430.45 km) long.

Between Moline and Danville, Route 150 closely parallels Interstate 74.

=== Indiana ===
In the state of Indiana, U.S. 150 runs south with U.S. Route 41 from Terre Haute. It is then concurrent with its parent, U.S. Route 50 from Vincennes to Shoals. It then runs east to New Albany before overlapping Interstate 64 into Kentucky. Between Vincennes and New Albany the road follows the original route of the Buffalo Trace.

=== Kentucky ===
U.S. 150 runs concurrently with I-64 as it enters Kentucky from Indiana, crossing the Ohio River into Louisville on the Sherman Minton Bridge and exiting the I-64 freeway at North 22nd Street in the Portland neighborhood. From there, U.S. 150 runs south to West Broadway (westbound U.S. 150 follows Dr. W. J. Hodges Street from West Broadway to West Main Street, then runs along the 22nd Street Connector to its merge with North 22nd near Garfield Avenue); U.S. 150 follows Broadway across downtown to Baxter Avenue; after a brief run along Baxter, It then follows Bardstown Road, a major radial artery running southeasterly from downtown, with interchanges at Interstates 264 and 265.

Between West Main and West Broadway in Louisville, U.S. 150 is concurrent with U.S. Route 31W; from East Broadway and Baxter to Bardstown, Kentucky, it is concurrent with U.S. Route 31E. The route along Baxter Avenue and Bardstown Road follows the former Louisville and Bardstown Turnpike through the Highlands district of Louisville and past the historic Farmington plantation at the interchange with the Watterson Expressway (I-264).

U.S. routes 150 and 31E separate at Bardstown near the Martha Layne Collins Blue Grass Parkway. U.S. 150 then continues southeast, around the city of Danville before terminating at Mount Vernon.

== History ==
=== Illinois ===
Before 1936, Illinois Route 39 ran from Bloomington to Champaign on the current routing of U.S. 150. In 1936, US 150 extended due northwest from Shoals, Indiana, to the Quad Cities. As a result, IL 39 and IL 91 were decommissioned. Not only that, IL 16, IL 80, and IL 121 were truncated. In 1954, a portion of US 150 in Peoria moved from the Franklin Street Bridge to the McClugage Bridge. As a result, US 150 City, later US 150 Bus., appeared in Peoria from 1954 to 1964. In 1971, the decision to remove a portion of US 150 from US 67 in Rock Island to I-74 in Danville failed. However, in 1976, the decision to truncate US 150 from US 67 in Rock Island to US 6 near the Quad City Airport was approved.

=== Indiana ===
Initially, US 150 ran from Shoals, Indiana, to Louisville, Kentucky. In 1936, US 150 extended due northwest from Shoals to the Quad Cities in Illinois. This caused IN 46 to cut back from the Illinois state line to Terre Haute.

=== Kentucky ===
U.S. Route 168
- Location: Louisville–Mount Vernon
- Existed: 1926–1934

U.S. Route 168 was created in 1926 from Louisville to Mount Vernon, Kentucky, overlapping US 68 between Bardstown and Perryville. In 1934, US 150 absorbed US 168.

== Major intersections ==
State	County	Location	mi	km	Destinations	Notes
Illinois	Rock Island	Moline	0.0	0.0	US 6 to I-74 / I-280 – Moline, Rock Island, Geneseo	
Illinois	Henry		13.4	21.6	IL 81 east / CR 7 to I-74 – Andover, Cambridge, Kewanee, Sherrard	
Illinois	Henry	Alpha	19.9	32.0	IL 17 west – New Windsor, Aledo	Western end of IL 17 overlap
Illinois	Henry	Alpha	21.4	34.4	IL 17 east to I-74 – Galva	Eastern end of IL 17 overlap
Illinois	Knox	Galesburg	35.3	56.8	US 34 / IL 110 (CKC) to I-74 – Kewanee, Monmouth	Interchange
Illinois	Knox	Galesburg	37.9	61.0	To US 34 west / West Main Street	
Illinois	Knox	Galesburg	39.5	63.6	To I-74 / East Main Street	
Illinois	Knox		46.0	74.0	IL 97 south – Havana, Maquon	
Illinois	Knox		46.4	74.7	I-74 – Galesburg, Peoria	I-74 exit 54
Illinois	Peoria		59.2	95.3	IL 180 north – Williamsfield	
Illinois	Peoria		63.7	102.5	IL 78 north – Kewanee	Western end of IL 78 overlap
Illinois	Peoria		66.7	107.3	IL 78 south – Elmwood, Canton	Eastern end of IL 78 overlap
Illinois	Peoria		67.0	107.8	CR R18 south to I-74 – Peoria, Galesburg	
Illinois	Peoria	Brimfield	70.5	113.5	CR R25 (Maher Road) to I-74 – Oak Hill	
Illinois	Peoria	Kickapoo	77.6	124.9	CR R40 south (Kickapoo Edwards Road) to I-74 – Wildlife Prairie Park	
Illinois	Peoria	Peoria	81.8	131.6	IL 91 north – Dunlap	
Illinois	Peoria	Peoria	82.1	132.1	IL 6 to I-74 / I-474 – Chillicothe	IL 6 exit 2
Illinois	Peoria	Peoria	85.7	137.9	I-74 – Bloomington, Galesburg	I-74 exit 89; no direct access from US 150 east to I-74 west or I-74 east to US 150 west
Illinois	Peoria	Peoria	87.5	140.8	IL 40 (Knoxville Avenue) – Sterling	
Illinois	Peoria	Peoria	89.7	144.4	IL 29 (Adams Street) – Chillicothe	Interchange
Illinois	Illinois River		89.9– 90.6	144.7– 145.8	McClugage Bridge	
Illinois	Tazewell	East Peoria	91.1	146.6	US 24 east / IL 116 east – Washington, Metamora, Illinois Central College	Interchange; western end of US 24 / IL 116 overlap; US 150 and US 24 switch carriageways
Illinois	Tazewell	East Peoria	95.0	152.9	I-74 / IL 29 north – Bloomington, Peoria	I-74 exit 95A; western end of IL 29 overlap
Illinois	Tazewell	East Peoria	95.2	153.2	US 24 west / IL 8 west / IL 29 south / IL 116 west (North Main Street)	Eastern end of US 24 / IL 29 / IL 116 overlap; western end of IL 8 overlap
Illinois	Tazewell	East Peoria	95.6	153.9	I-74 west – Peoria	I-74 exit 95B; eastbound exit and westbound entrance
Illinois	Tazewell	East Peoria	96.1	154.7	IL 8 east (East Washington Street) – Washington	Eastern end of IL 8 overlap
Illinois	Woodford	Goodfield	112.8	181.5	IL 117 to I-74 – Eureka	
Illinois	McLean		127.7	205.5	I-74 – Champaign, Peoria	I-74 exit 125
Illinois	McLean	Bloomington	131.4	211.5	IL 9 west – Pekin	Western end of IL 9 overlap
Illinois	McLean	Bloomington	133.0	214.0	I-55 / I-74 / US 51 – Springfield, Champaign, Decatur, Joliet, Peoria, Rockford	I-55 exit 160
Illinois	McLean	Bloomington	134.9	217.1	US 51 Bus. south (Center Street) / Historic US 66 – Decatur	
Illinois	McLean	Bloomington	134.9	217.1	US 51 Bus. north (Main Street) / Historic US 66 – Peru, Wesleyan University	
Illinois	McLean	Bloomington	135.4	217.9	IL 9 east (Locust Street) – Gibson City	Eastern end of IL 9 overlap
Illinois	McLean	Bloomington	137.6	221.4	I-55 BL / Historic US 66 (Veterans Parkway)	Alternate route of Historic US 66
Illinois	McLean		155.8	250.7	US 136 – Rantoul, Heyworth	
Illinois	DeWitt	Farmer City	161.9	260.6	IL 54 – Gibson City, Clinton	
Illinois	Piatt	No major junctions				
Illinois	Champaign	Mahomet	174.2	280.3	IL 47 south (Division Street) to I-72	Western end of IL 47 overlap
Illinois	Champaign	Mahomet	174.6	281.0	IL 47 north (Lombard Street) to I-74 – Gibson City, Early American Museum	Eastern end of IL 47 overlap
Illinois	Champaign	Champaign	184.8	297.4	IL 10 west (Springfield Avenue) to I-57 / I-72 – Bondville	
Illinois	Champaign	Champaign	185.5	298.5	US 45 south (Neil Street) – Pesotum, Business District	Western end of US 45 overlap
Illinois	Champaign	Urbana	187.8	302.2	US 45 north (Cunningham Avenue) / Vine Street – Rantoul, Urbana Business District	Eastern end of US 45 overlap
Illinois	Champaign	Urbana	188.9	304.0	IL 130 north to I-74 – Danville, Bloomington	Western end of IL 130 overlap
Illinois	Champaign	Urbana	190.1	305.9	IL 130 south (High Cross Road) – Charleston	Eastern end of IL 130 overlap
Illinois	Champaign	Ogden	201.0	323.5	IL 49 south to I-74 – Casey	Western end of IL 49 overlap
Illinois	Vermilion	DeLong	204.0	328.3	IL 49 north – Kankakee	Eastern end of IL 49 overlap
Illinois	Vermilion		215.0	346.0	I-74 – Champaign, Indianapolis	I-74 exit 210
Illinois	Vermilion	Danville	219.0	352.4	US 136 / IL 1 north – Chicago, Business District	Western end of IL 1 overlap
Illinois	Vermilion	Tilton	220.4	354.7	I-74 – Indianapolis, Champaign	I-74 exit 215
Illinois	Edgar		242.3	389.9	US 36 – Indianapolis, Decatur	
Illinois	Edgar	Paris	255.5	411.2	IL 1 south (Central Street) / IL 16 west / IL 133 west (Jasper Street) – Marshall, Charleston, Arcola	Eastern end of IL 1 overlap
			264.3 0.000	425.3 0.000	Illinois–Indiana state line	
Indiana	Vigo	West Terre Haute	13.046	20.996	Historic National Road west (National Avenue) to I-70 west	Former US 40 west
Indiana	Vigo	Terre Haute	14.854	23.905	US 41 north (3rd Street) / Historic National Road east (Wabash Avenue) to Ohio Street east / I-70 – Swope Art Museum	Western end of US 41 overlap; former US 40 east
Indiana	see US 41 and US 50					
Indiana	Martin	Shoals	112.817	181.561	US 50 east – Bedford	Eastern end of US 50 overlap
Indiana	Martin	Lacy	115.309	185.572	SR 550 west – Hindostan Falls	
Indiana	Orange	Prospect	126.342	203.328	SR 56 west	Western end of SR 56 overlap
Indiana	Orange	Paoli	135.093	217.411	SR 37 south (Southwest 1st Street) – English, Tell City	Western end of SR 37 overlap
Indiana	Orange	Paoli	135.144	217.493	SR 37 north (North Gospel Street)	Eastern end of SR 37 overlap; traffic circle around Orange County Courthouse
Indiana	Orange	Paoli	135.436	217.963	SR 56 east (Northeast Main Street) – Salem	Eastern end of SR 56 overlap
Indiana	Washington	Fayetteville	149.044	239.863	SR 66 west – Milltown, Marengo	
Indiana	Harrison	Palmyra	157.899	254.114	SR 135 (Greene Street) – Salem, Corydon	
Indiana	Floyd	Greenville	164.065	264.037	SR 335 north – Martinsburg	
Indiana	Floyd		172.923	278.293	I-64 west / SR 62 west – St. Louis	Western end of I-64 / SR 62 overlap; US 150 west follows exit 119
Indiana	Floyd		174.801	281.315	I-265 east / SR 62 east to I-65	Eastern end of SR 62 overlap; I-64 exit 121; I-265 exit 0
Indiana	Floyd	New Albany	176.208	283.579	New Albany	I-64 exit 123
Ohio River			177.165– 0.000	285.119– 0.000	Sherman Minton Bridge; Indiana–Kentucky state line	
Kentucky	Jefferson	Louisville			I-264 east – Shively	I-64 exit 1; I-264 exit 0
Kentucky	Jefferson	Louisville			I-64 east – Lexington	Eastern end of I-64 overlap; US 150 east follows exit 3
Kentucky	Jefferson	Louisville			KY 3064 west (Portland Avenue)	Eastern terminus of unsigned KY 3064; one-way westbound only
Kentucky	Jefferson	Louisville			KY 3082 (Bank Street)	Eastern terminus of unsigned KY 3082; KY 3082 is one-way eastbound onto US 150 only
Kentucky	Jefferson	Louisville			US 31W north / US 60 east (West Market Street)	Western end of US 31W / US 60 overlap
Kentucky	Jefferson	Louisville			US 31W south / US 60 west (South 22nd Street)	Eastern end of US 31W / US 60 overlap
Kentucky	Jefferson	Louisville			KY 1020 south (South Third Street)	
Kentucky	Jefferson	Louisville			KY 1020 north (South Second Street)	
Kentucky	Jefferson	Louisville			KY 61 south (South Preston Street)	
Kentucky	Jefferson	Louisville			KY 61 north (South Jackson Street)	
Kentucky	Jefferson	Louisville			KY 864 south (South Shelby Street)	
Kentucky	Jefferson	Louisville			KY 864 north (South Campbell Street)	
Kentucky	Jefferson	Louisville			US 31E north (Baxter Avenue)	Western end of US 31E overlap
Kentucky	see US 31E					
Kentucky	Nelson	Bardstown			US 31E south / US 62 west (West Stephen Foster Avenue) to Bluegrass Parkway west – Airport	Eastern end of US 31E overlap; western end of US 62 overlap; traffic circle around Old Courthouse Building
Kentucky	Nelson	Bardstown			US 62 east (Bloomfield Road) – Bloomfield	Eastern end of US 62 overlap
Kentucky	Nelson	Bardstown			KY 49 south – Loretto	
Kentucky	Nelson	Bardstown			KY 245 north / US 31E Truck north / US 150 Truck west	Western end of US 31E Truck overlap
Kentucky	Nelson	Bardstown			Bluegrass Parkway / US 31E Truck south – Lexington, Elizabethtown	Bluegrass Parkway exit 25; eastern end of US 31E Truck overlap
Kentucky	Nelson				KY 605 north	Western end of KY 605 overlap
Kentucky	Nelson	Botland			KY 605 south	Eastern end of KY 605 overlap
Kentucky	Washington	Fredericktown			KY 1872 (Fredricktown Road)	
Kentucky	Washington				KY 1030 (Bearwallow Road)	
Kentucky	Washington				KY 1724 (Cartwright Road)	
Kentucky	Washington				US 150 Bus. east – St. Catharine, Springfield	
Kentucky	Washington				KY 55 – Bloomfield	
Kentucky	Washington				KY 528 – Springfield, Lincoln Homestead State Park	
Kentucky	Washington	Springfield			KY 555 to Bluegrass Parkway – Springfield, Lebanon	
Kentucky	Washington				KY 1584	
Kentucky	Washington				KY 152 – Mackville, Springfield	
Kentucky	Washington				US 150 Bus. west – Springfield	
Kentucky	Washington	Rineltown			KY 2758 (Simmstown Road)	
Kentucky	Washington				KY 1195 (Short Line Road)	
Kentucky	Washington				KY 442 north	
Kentucky	Boyle	Perryville			KY 1920 west (Jackson Street) – Perryville Battlefield State Historic Site	
Kentucky	Boyle	Perryville			US 68 west / KY 52 west	Western end of US 68 / KY 52 overlap
Kentucky	Boyle	Perryville			US 68 east / KY 1856 south (Bragg Street)	Eastern end of US 68 overlap
Kentucky	Boyle				KY 1822 north (Quirks Run Road)	Western end of KY 1822 overlap
Kentucky	Boyle	Needmore			KY 1822 south (Parksville Cross Pike)	Eastern end of KY 1822 overlap
Kentucky	Boyle	Danville			KY 3366 north (Bluegrass Pike)	
Kentucky	Boyle	Danville			US 127 Byp. / US 150 Byp. east	
Kentucky	Boyle	Danville			KY 34 west (Lebanon Road)	Western end of KY 34 overlap
Kentucky	Boyle	Danville			US 127 north (Maple Avenue)	Western end of US 127 overlap
Kentucky	Boyle	Danville			US 127 south (South 4th Street)	Eastern end of US 127 south overlap (eastbound)
Kentucky	Boyle	Danville			KY 33 north (North 3rd Street)	Eastern end of US 127 north overlap (westbound)
Kentucky	Boyle	Danville			KY 34 east (Old Wilderness Road)	Eastern end of KY 34 overlap
Kentucky	Boyle	Danville			KY 52 east (Lancaster Road)	Eastern end of KY 52 overlap
Kentucky	Boyle				US 150 Byp. west	
Kentucky	Boyle				KY 1273 east (Chrisman Lane)	Western end of KY 1273 overlap
Kentucky	Boyle				KY 1273 west (Airport Road)	Eastern end of KY 1273 overlap
Kentucky	Lincoln				KY 3248 – Hubble	
Kentucky	Lincoln	Stanford			KY 300	
Kentucky	Lincoln	Stanford			US 27 – Lancaster, Stanford	
Kentucky	Lincoln				KY 78 – Stanford	
Kentucky	Lincoln				KY 1770 (Old US 150)	
Kentucky	Lincoln				KY 1369 – William Whitley House State Historic Site	
Kentucky	Lincoln				KY 2750 – Crab Orchard	
Kentucky	Lincoln				KY 643	
Kentucky	Lincoln				KY 39 – Crab Orchard	
Kentucky	Lincoln				KY 2750 (Copper Creek Road)	Western end of KY 2750 overlap
Kentucky	Lincoln				KY 2750	Eastern end of KY 2750 overlap
Kentucky	Rockcastle				Fort Harrod Way	Former KY 2750
Kentucky	Rockcastle				KY 2250 (West Main Street) – Brodhead	
Kentucky	Rockcastle				KY 2250 (East Main Street) / KY 3245 – Brodhead	
Kentucky	Rockcastle				KY 1229 (Dug Hill Road)	
Kentucky	Rockcastle				KY 70 west	
Kentucky	Rockcastle				KY 1250 (Spiro Road)	
Kentucky	Rockcastle	Maretburg			KY 2108 (Maretburg Road)	
Kentucky	Rockcastle				KY 461 to I-75 – Renfro Valley, Berea, Somerset	
Kentucky	Rockcastle				KY 2549 (White Rock Road)	
Kentucky	Rockcastle	Mount Vernon			US 25 / KY 1249 – London, Berea	
1.000 mi = 1.609 km; 1.000 km = 0.621 mi: Concurrency terminus; Incomplete access

== Special routes ==
=== Springfield business loop ===
U.S. Route 150 Business
- Location: Springfield

U.S. Route 150 Business (US 150 Bus.) is a special U.S. Route in Springfield, Kentucky. The route runs through downtown Springfield while US 150 bypasses the town to the northeast. It intersects Kentucky state highways 152, 555, 528, 1584, and 1404.

=== Danville bypass ===
U.S. Route 150 Bypass
- Location: Danville

U.S. Route 150 Bypass (US 150 Byp.) is a special U.S. Route in Danville, Kentucky. The route bypasses Danville to the southwest while US 150 runs through downtown. The route is overlapped by US 127 Byp. for approximately the first half of its length. It intersects US 127, along with Kentucky state routes 34 and 37.

== See also ==
- U.S. Route 50
- U.S. Route 250
- U.S. Route 350
- U.S. Route 450
- U.S. Route 550
- U.S. Route 650
- Roads in Louisville, Kentucky

Browse numbered routes
← IL 149	IL	→ IL 150
← KY 149	KY	→ KY 151
