= Kentucky Route 555 =

State highway in Kentucky, United States

Kentucky Route 555
- KY 555 highlighted in red

Route information
- Maintained by KYTC
- Length: 18.301 mi (29.453 km)

Major junctions
- South end: US 150 Bus. / KY 55 / KY 152 in Springfield
- KY 53 near Willisburg; Bluegrass Parkway near Brush Grove
- North end: US 62 in rural western Anderson County

Location
- Country: United States
- State: Kentucky
- Counties: Washington, Anderson

Highway system
- Kentucky State Highway System; Interstate; US; State; Parkways
| ← KY 554 | → KY 556 |

Kentucky Route 555 (KY 555) is a 17-mile-long (27 km) north–south state highway that traverses two counties in the western part of central Kentucky's Bluegrass Region.

== Route description ==
KY 555 begins in Springfield at intersections with U.S. Route 150 (US 150) and its business loop counterpart, US 150 Business (US 150 Bus.). It has a junction with KY 53 just west of Willisburg. It intersects the Bluegrass Parkway in rural northern Washington County. From there, the highway extends into Anderson County and terminates at an intersection with US 62 in a rural area of the southwestern section of the county southeast of Taylorsville Lake. KY 248 continues the high-quality road to KY 44 east of Taylorsville.

== History ==
KY 555 was formed between 1968 and 1973; it replaced a portion of KY 53 near its south end and was intended to provide better access to the Bluegrass Parkway eastbound.

Until the 2010–11 fiscal year, the Bluegrass Parkway interchange was KY 555's northern terminus. In the 2011–12 fiscal year, KY 555 was extended into southwestern Anderson County to end at its current northern terminus at US 62.

The original KY 555 ran in west central Edmonson County from KY 70 in Grassland to KY 67 in Segal; this was combined with part of KY 67 (which was also decommissioned) to form KY 655 between 1968 and 1973.

== Major intersections ==
| County | Location | mi | km | Destinations | Notes |
|---|---|---|---|---|---|
| Washington | Springfield | 0.000 | 0.000 | US 150 Bus. / KY 55 / KY 152 (Main Street) – Lebanon, Springfield, Bardstown, Airport | |
| Washington | Springfield | 0.160 | 0.257 | KY 3488 north (Industry Drive) | |
| Washington | Springfield | 0.441 | 0.710 | KY 3488 south (Industry Drive) | |
| Washington | Springfield | 0.841 | 1.353 | KY 528 – Lincoln Homestead State Park | |
| Washington | Springfield | 1.417 | 2.280 | US 150 – Bardstown, Perryville, Danville | |
| Washington | | 6.215 | 10.002 | KY 438 west (Beechland Road) – Lincoln Homestead State Park | south end of KY 438 overlap |
| Washington | | 7.091 | 11.412 | KY 438 east (Mayes Creek Road) | north end of KY 438 overlap |
| Washington | | 8.643 | 13.910 | KY 53 north – Willisburg | |
| Washington | | 10.380 | 16.705 | KY 433 – Willisburg | |
| Washington | | 12.707 | 20.450 | KY 1796 (Brush Grove Road) | |
| Washington | | 14.354 | 23.101 | KY 1754 | |
| Washington | | 14.639 | 23.559 | Bluegrass Parkway – Bardstown, Elizabethtown, Lawrenceburg, Lexington | Bluegrass Parkway exit 42 |
| Washington | | 14.838 | 23.879 | Terrell Ridge Road | former KY 2770 west |
| Nelson | No major junctions | | | | |
| Anderson | | 18.301 | 29.453 | US 62 – Chaplin | |
1.000 mi = 1.609 km; 1.000 km = 0.621 mi
