= Kentucky Route 528 =

State highway in Kentucky, United States

Kentucky Route 528
- KY 528 highlighted in red

Route information
- Maintained by KYTC
- Length: 7.144 mi (11.497 km)

Major junctions
- South end: KY 55 / KY 3164 near Springfield
- US 150 Bus. / KY 152 in Springfield; KY 555 in Springfield; US 150 near Springfield
- North end: KY 438 at Lincoln Homestead State Park

Location
- Country: United States
- State: Kentucky
- Counties: Washington

Highway system
- Kentucky State Highway System; Interstate; US; State; Parkways
← KY 527	→ KY 529

Kentucky Route 528 (KY 528) is a 7.144-mile-long (11.497 km) state highway in Washington County, Kentucky, that runs from Kentucky Routes 55 and 3164 southwest of Springfield to Kentucky Route 438 at the Lincoln Homestead State Park via Springfield.

== Major intersections ==
The entire route is in Washington County.

Location	mi	km	Destinations	Notes
	0.000	0.000	KY 55 (Lebanon Road) / KY 3164 south (Co Op Loop)	Southern terminus; northern terminus of KY 3164; continues as KY 3164 beyond KY 55
Springfield	1.524	2.453	US 150 Bus. / KY 152 (Main Street)	
Springfield	2.560	4.120	KY 555	
	3.117	5.016	US 150	
Lincoln Homestead State Park	7.144	11.497	KY 438 (Beechland Road)	Northern terminus
1.000 mi = 1.609 km; 1.000 km = 0.621 mi
