= Kentucky Route 53 =

State highway in Kentucky, United States

Kentucky Route 53
- KY 53 highlighted in red

Route information
- Maintained by KYTC
- Length: 66.314 mi (106.722 km)

Major junctions
- South end: KY 555 near Willisburg
- US 62 near Beaver Lake; I-64 in Shelbyville; US 60 / KY 55 Bus. in Shelbyville; I-71 in LaGrange
- North end: US 42 in Oldham County

Location
- Country: United States
- State: Kentucky
- Counties: Washington, Anderson, Spencer, Shelby, Oldham

Highway system
- Kentucky State Highway System; Interstate; US; State; Parkways
← KY 52	→ KY 54

Kentucky Route 53 (KY 53) is a 66.314-mile-long (106.722 km) state highway in the U.S. state of Kentucky.

== Route description ==
The route begins at an intersection with KY 555 south of Willisburg and heads northeast through the city.

It continues northeast into Anderson County and intersects the Martha Layne Collins Blue Grass Parkway.

Just south of Beaver Lake KY 53 turns toward the northwest and forms a concurrency with US 62.

Further north in Glensboro, it forms a concurrency with KY 44 and continues northwest, briefly passing through Spencer County before entering Shelby County.

In Shelby County, the route passes through Mount Eden and heads northwest into Shelbyville.

In Shelbyville, KY 53 intersects Interstate 64 as well as US 60. North of Shelbyville, the route enters Oldham County and passes through Ballardsville and LaGrange, where it intersects with Interstate 71. KY 53 ends at an intersection with US 42 north of LaGrange.

== Major intersections ==
County	Location	mi	km	Destinations	Notes
Washington		0.000	0.000	KY 555	Southern terminus
Washington		1.656	2.665	KY 433 north (Polin Road)	South end of KY 433 overlap
Washington	Willisburg	2.586	4.162	KY 433 south – Mackville	North end of KY 433 overlap
Washington	Willisburg	3.485	5.609	KY 1754 west (Chaplin Road)	Eastern terminus of KY 1754
Washington		7.313	11.769	KY 1586 south (Cardwell Road)	north terminus of KY 1586
Washington		10.071	16.208	KY 390 east (Seaville Road)	Western terminus of KY 390
Anderson		12.314	19.817	Bluegrass Parkway – Bardstown, Elizabethtown, Lexington	Bluegrass Parkway exit 48
Anderson		12.412	19.975	KY 1291 west (Kays Road)	Southern terminus of KY 1291
Anderson		17.016	27.385	US 62 east (Bardstown Road) – Lawrenceburg	South end of US 62 overlap
Anderson		18.735	30.151	US 62 west (Bardstown Road) – Bloomfield	North end of US 62 overlap
Anderson	Glensboro	21.306	34.289	KY 44 east	South end of KY 44 overlap
Anderson		23.579	37.947	KY 1579 south (Pleasant Grove Ridge Road)	Northern terminus of KY 1579
Spencer	No major junctions				
Shelby	Mount Eden	29.070	46.784	KY 636 (Back Creek Road)	
Shelby	Southville	33.501	53.915	KY 44 west (Southville Pike) / KY 714 north (Hempridge Road) – Taylorsville	North end of KY 44 overlap
Shelby	Shelbyville	39.294	63.238	KY 1790 east (Hooper Station Road)	Western terminus of KY 1790
Shelby	Shelbyville	39.596	63.724	I-64 – Louisville, Frankfort, Lexington	I-64 exit 35
Shelby		40.757	65.592	Seven Mile Road (KY 2258 east)	Western terminus of KY 2258
Shelby	Veachland	41.507	66.799	US 60 east / KY 55 Bus. north (Boone Station Road) – Eminence, Cropper, Bagdad, Frankfort	South end of US 60 / KY 55 Bus. overlap
Shelby	Shelbyville			North 7th Street - Eminence, New Castle, Clear Creek Park	former KY 55 north
Shelby	Shelbyville	43.193	69.512	US 60 west / KY 55 Bus. south (Washington Street)	North end of US 60 / KY 55 Bus. overlap
Shelby		44.952	72.343	KY 55 (Freedom's Way)	
Shelby		48.979	78.824	KY 362 west (Aiken Road)	Eastern terminus of KY 362
Shelby		51.415	82.744	KY 322 north (Lucas Road) – Smithfield	Southern terminus of KY 322
Oldham		57.299	92.214	KY 1315 south (Old Hanna Road)	Northern terminus of KY 1315
Oldham		57.864	93.123	KY 22 east – Eminence	South end of KY 22 overlap
Oldham	Ballardsville	58.337	93.884	KY 22 west – Crestwood	North end of KY 22 overlap
Oldham		59.422	95.630	KY 2856 west (East Moody Lane)	Eastern terminus of KY 2856
Oldham	La Grange	61.565	99.079	I-71 – Louisville, Cincinnati	I-71 exit 22
Oldham	La Grange	62.324	100.301	KY 146 (Jefferson Street) – Crestwood, New Castle, Kentucky State Reformatory	
Oldham		63.663	102.456	KY 3223 (Old Sligo Road)	Southern terminus of KY 3223
Oldham		66.314	106.722	US 42	Northern terminus
1.000 mi = 1.609 km; 1.000 km = 0.621 mi: Concurrency terminus
