= Bluegrass Parkway =

Highway in Kentucky, U.S.

Bluegrass Parkway
- Martha Layne Collins Blue Grass Parkway

Route information
- Maintained by KYTC
- Length: 71.134 mi (114.479 km)

Major junctions
- West end: I-65 in Elizabethtown
- US 31E near Bardstown; US 150 near Bardstown; US 127 / KY 513 near Lawrenceburg
- East end: US 60 near Versailles

Location
- Country: United States
- State: Kentucky
- Counties: Hardin, Nelson, Washington, Anderson, Mercer, Woodford

Highway system
- Kentucky State Highway System; Interstate; US; State; Parkways

The Martha Layne Collins Blue Grass Parkway is a freeway running from Elizabethtown, Kentucky to Woodford County, Kentucky, for a length of 71.134 miles (114.479 km). It intersects with Interstate 65 at its western terminus, and U.S. Route 60 at its eastern terminus. It is one of seven highways that are part of the Kentucky parkway system. The road is designated unsigned Kentucky Route 9002 (BG 9002). It is constructed similar to the Interstate Highway system, though sections do not measure up to current Interstate standards.

== History ==
The Bluegrass Parkway's previous shield

=== As a toll road ===
In 1963, the Kentucky Turnpike Authority recommended what was then known as the "Central Kentucky Turnpike" be constructed from Elizabethtown to the Lexington-Frankfort area. The parkway was opened in November 1965 as the Kentucky Bluegrass Parkway (the "Kentucky" was dropped a few years later) and was originally a toll road, as were all Kentucky parkways. The parkway route largely parallels that of U.S. Route 62. State law requires that toll collection ceases when enough tolls are collected to pay off the parkway's construction bonds which occurred in 1991.

==== Toll plazas and charges ====
The table below shows the locations of the former toll plazas, and toll charges that were previously charged for consumer-sized, or class 1 vehicles.

Exit	Location	Through cars charge	Enter or Exit
10	Boston	40 cents	20 cents
34	Bloomfield	50 cents	25 cents
59A-B	Lawrenceburg	40 cents	20 cents
Full-length trip		$1.30	

=== Name changes ===
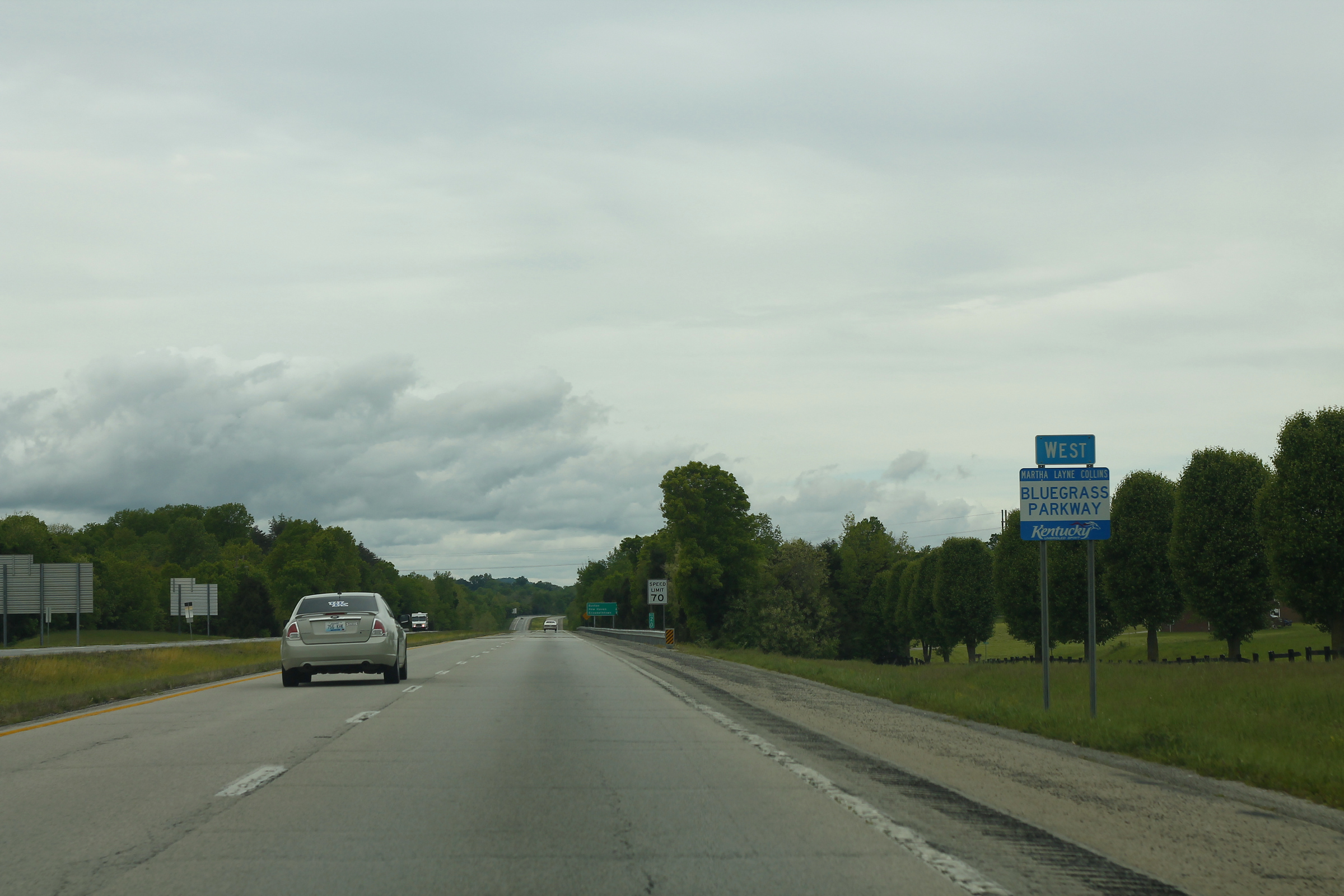
Westbound Bluegrass Parkway near Bardstown

In 2003, the road was renamed in honor of Martha Layne Collins, the first female governor of Kentucky. Previously, it was the Kentucky Bluegrass parkway (and signed as "KB Parkway"), then later renamed the "Blue Grass Parkway" (sometimes with "Bluegrass" as one word, though in the highway's name, it was officially two words), and often called the "BG Parkway" because of the abbreviation once used on its original signs from 1965 until they were replaced by a shield with the Collins name in 2003.

== Route description ==
The parkway begins in Hardin County, at a trumpet interchange with I-65 near Elizabethtown. It traverses Nelson, northern Washington, northern Mercer, southern Anderson, and Woodford counties, passing Bardstown, Lawrenceburg, and ending just east of Versailles at US-60, where high-speed ramps allow traffic to continue to Lexington via US-60 eastbound.

The toll plazas, which were removed in 1991, were located at the following locations:

- Exit 10 at Boston
- Exit 34 at Bloomfield, and
- Exit 59 at Lawrenceburg.

== Proposals ==
=== Connection with Interstate 64 ===
No connection to I-64 was planned as it had not been constructed and would not open until the late 1970s. There have been talks for a direct connection from the eastern terminus of the parkway at US 60 to I-64, but nothing has been finalized. Such a connection would likely face opposition in the Lexington area due to the many horse farms that would be adversely affected as the thoroughbred breeding industry is an important direct employer and a major tourist draw in the region.

== Exit list ==
County	Location	mi	km	Exit	Destinations	Notes
Hardin	Elizabethtown	0.000	0.000	0	I-65 to Western Kentucky Parkway – Louisville, Elizabethtown, Nashville, Paducah	Western terminus and signed as exits 0A (south) & 0B (north); I-65 exit 93 and parkway ends
Hardin	Youngers Creek	7.900	12.714	8	KY 583 to US 62 – Youngers Creek	Eastbound exit and westbound entrance
Nelson		9.523	15.326	10	KY 52 to US 62 – New Haven, Boston	
Nelson	Bardstown	20.459	32.926	21	US 31E – Bardstown, Hodgenville	
Nelson	Bardstown	24.469	39.379	25	US 150 – Bardstown, Springfield	
Nelson		28.900	46.510	29	KY 1858 to US 62	Proposed interchange
Nelson		33.301	53.593	34	KY 55 – Springfield, Bloomfield	
Washington	Brush Grove	41.401	66.628	42	KY 555 south – Springfield, Lebanon	
Anderson		47.838	76.988	48	KY 53 to US 62 – Willisburg	
Anderson		58.791	94.615	59	US 127 to I-64 – Lawrenceburg, Frankfort, Harrodsburg, Danville	Signed as Exits 59A and 59B
Woodford	Versailles	68.248	109.835	68	KY 33 – Versailles	
Woodford	Versailles	71.134	114.479	72	US 60 – Versailles, Lexington	Eastern terminus and signed as exits 72A (west) & 72B (east); parkway ends
1.000 mi = 1.609 km; 1.000 km = 0.621 mi: Incomplete access; Unopened
