= Huntertown, Kentucky =

Huntertown is in Woodford County, Kentucky. It was established by a veteran of the American Civil War who was African American. There is a Huntertown Elementary School nearby.

The Bluegrass Parkway was constructed through Huntertown, splitting it, and worsened flooding issues. Residents were paid to move elsewhere in 2003. A commemorative marker recounts the settlement's history.
