= Bearwallow, Kentucky =

Unincorporated community in Kentucky, United States

Bearwallow
- Unincorporated community
- Location within the state of Kentucky Bearwallow (the United States)
- Coordinates: 37°42′13″N 85°19′3″W
- Country: United States
- State: Kentucky
- County: Washington
- Time zone: UTC-5 (Eastern (EST))
  - Summer (DST): UTC-4 (EDT)
- GNIS feature ID: 507469

Bearwallow is an unincorporated crossroads village in Washington County, Kentucky, United States. It lies at the intersection of roads from Bardstown, Cisselville, Fredericktown, Manton, and McIntyre.

The name comes from a small depression where bears came to wallow in a mud hole.
