= U.S. Route 62 in Kentucky =

Highway in Kentucky

U.S. Route 62
- US 62 highlighted in red

Route information
- Maintained by KYTC
- Length: 391.207 mi (629.587 km)
- Existed: 1930–present

Major junctions
- West end: US 51 / US 60 / US 62 at the Illinois state line in Cairo
- I-24 in Paducah; I-24 / I-69 in Calvert City; I-24 / I-69 in Kuttawa; I-69 in Eddyville; I-169 in Nortonville; I-65 in Elizabethtown; I-64 near Midway; I-75 in Georgetown
- East end: US 62 at the Ohio state line in Maysville

Location
- Country: United States
- State: Kentucky
- Counties: Ballard, Carlisle, McCracken, Marshall, Livingston, Lyon, Caldwell, Hopkins, Muhlenberg, Ohio, Grayson, Hardin, Nelson, Anderson, Woodford, Scott, Bourbon, Harrison, Robertson, Mason

Highway system
- United States Numbered Highway System; List; Special; Divided; Kentucky State Highway System; Interstate; US; State; Parkways
← KY 61	→ KY 63

U.S. Route 62 (US 62) in Kentucky runs for a total of 391.207 miles (629.587 km) across 20 counties in western, north-central, and northeastern Kentucky. It enters the state by crossing the Ohio River near Wickliffe, then begins heading eastward at Bardwell, and traversing several cities and towns across the state up to Maysville, where it crosses the Ohio River a second time to enter the state of Ohio.

== Route description ==
=== Wickliffe to Elizabethtown ===
US 62 runs concurrently with US 51 for its first 16.17 miles (26.02 km) in Ballard and Carlisle counties in the Jackson Purchase region of southwestern Kentucky. US 62 separates from US 51 at Bardwell, where it turns northeastward towards Paducah. It then intersects Interstate 24 (I-24) near Whitehaven, the Kentucky Welcome Center, and it runs concurrently with US 45 and US 60, along with parts of the I-24 Business Loop in downtown Paducah.

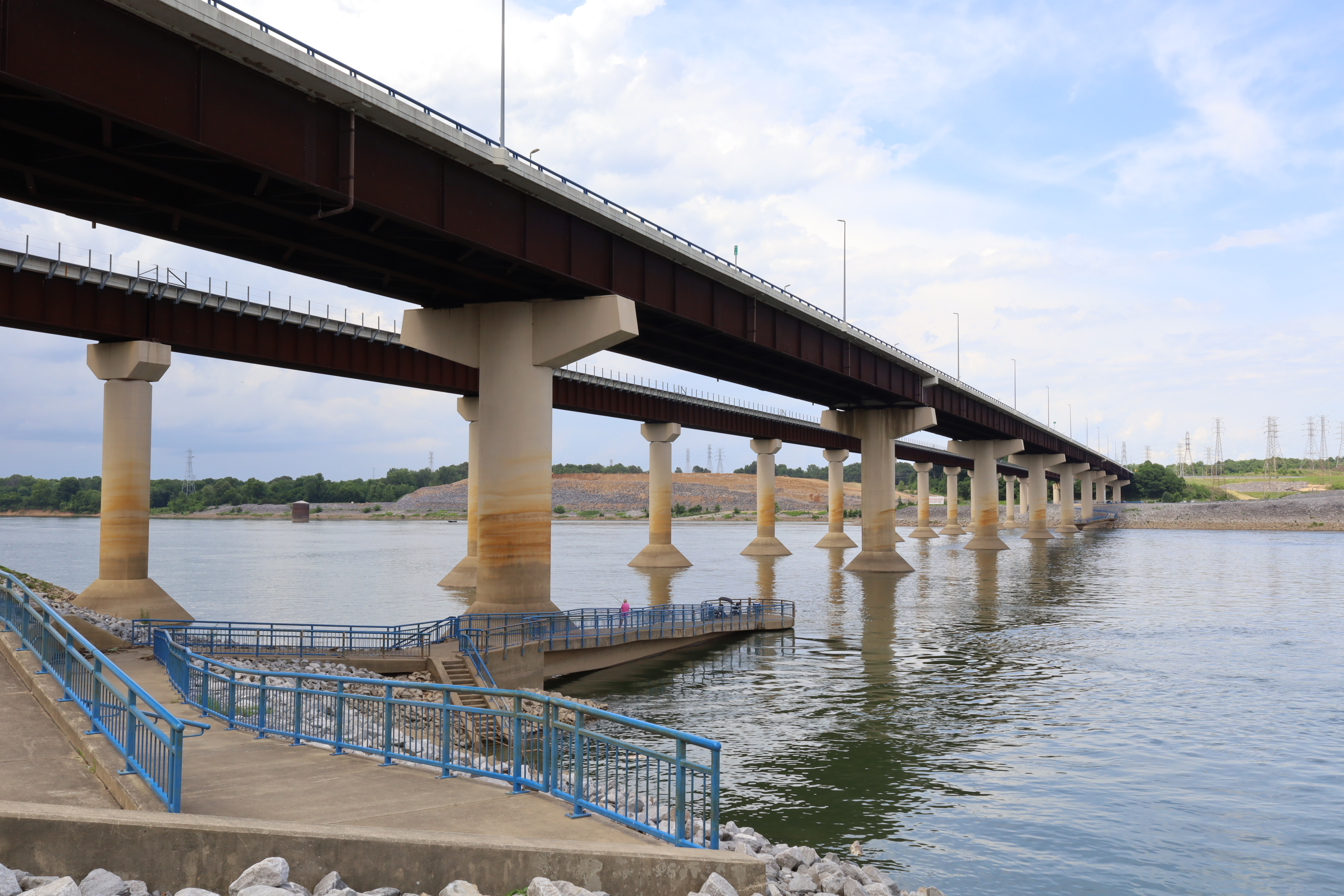
The George A. Ellis Bridge (foreground) carries U.S. 62 and U.S. 641 over the Tennessee River.

After entering Marshall County, US 62 continues eastward to cross I-24 two more times, the second time before traversing Kentucky Dam and into southern Livingston County. The third time US 62 crosses I-24 is near Eddyville during its concurrency with US 641 in Lyon County.

It then intersects I-69 (Western Kentucky Parkway) east of Eddyville before entering Caldwell County. US 62 closely follows the Western Kentucky Parkway (also known to locals as the WK Parkway) through Caldwell, Hopkins, Muhlenberg, Ohio, Grayson, and Hardin counties. The route traverses several towns and cities such as Princeton, Dawson Springs, Nortonville, Greenville, and Central City. In Muhlenberg County from Greenville to Central City, the US Route closely follows the four-lane Kentucky Route 189 (KY 189), which carries through traffic around the city of Powderly while US 62 traverses the urban areas of the three cities. Near Beaver Dam, after the route's US 231 concurrency through that city, US 62 does cross I-165 (formerly the William H. Natcher Parkway), but without access to that freeway. The route continues eastward into Grayson County towards Caneyville, Leitchfield, and Clarkson before reaching Elizabethtown, in Hardin County.

=== Elizabethtown to Maysville ===
After reaching Elizabethtown, it has a concurrency with KY 61, crossing exit 94 on I-65, and into Nelson County. US 62 begins to parallel the Bluegrass Parkway, and it does so all the way to Versailles. Beyond Versailles, US 62 turns northeastward to cross I-64 and reaches Georgetown.

US 62 continues on a northeasterly track into the northwesternmost corner of Bourbon County before entering Harrison County. It then traverses towns such as Cynthiana, Oddville, and Mt. Olivet, before reaching the Mason County seat, Maysville. There, it runs concurrently with US 68 Business into downtown Maysville (the main alignment of US 68 was rerouted onto a bypass route), and crosses the Ohio River into Brown County, Ohio, where it meets the main alignment of US 68.

== History ==
=== Kentucky Route 50 ===
Kentucky Route 50
- Location: Bardwell-Lexington, Kentucky
- Existed: 1929–1936

Before US 62 was certified in Kentucky, the route from Bardwell to Lawrenceburg, along with the present-day US 127 between Lawrenceburg and Frankfort (running concurrently with KY 35 at the time), and the original alignment of US 421 between Frankfort and Lexington (mostly now KY 1681), were all signed as Kentucky Route 50 (KY 50). KY 50 ran the entire original alignment from Bardwell to Lawrenceburg until US 62 was certified sometime before 1934. However, the KY 50 designation remained on the present-day alignment of KY 112 in Hopkins County from just east of Dawson Springs to Earlington, since US 62 was routed directly to Nortonville from Dawson Springs. The KY 112 designation in Hopkins County replaced KY 50 sometime around 1936. The last section of KY 50 remaining after this was the section from Frankfort to Lexington; this became part of US 421 when it was extended into Kentucky.

=== Current history ===
In eastern McCracken and into southern Livingston and northern Lyon Counties, US 62 originally followed US 60 east of Paducah to Smithland, where it turned right using present-day alignments of KY 453 and KY 93 to Eddyville. That segment of US 62 was rerouted to its current location before the end of the 1930s.

In Harrison County, US 62 previously followed a route east of Cynthiana to start its concurrency with US 68 just south of Blue Lick State Park until it was rerouted to its current course to Maysville prior to 1940.

Until 1963, US 62 followed a route from Kuttawa, into what was the inner part of Eddyville, and followed a due easterly path to Princeton via Saratoga Springs. This original alignment is now parts of Kentucky Routes 93 and KY 293, while US 62 was rerouted onto the former KY 278, where it meets up with US 641, and to provide a proper intersection with the Western Kentucky Parkway west of Princeton.

When I-24's route through Kentucky was completed at some time between 1976 and 1979, US 62's junction with the WK Parkway was closed off as a result of the extension project to extend the WK Parkway to Eddyville to build its western terminus at I-24's exit 42 interchange. The original connector is still in existence as a county-maintained road, with a dead end where the connector connected to the parkway where the Mile Marker 10 toll booth was originally located until 1987.

In 2009, the Kentucky Dam was bypassed by a new girder bridge.

In the early 2010s, a section of US 62 in western Anderson County was reconstructed to accommodate the new intersection with KY 555, which was extended from its junction with the Bluegrass Parkway in northern Washington County. US 62's junction with KY 248 was also reconstructed.

== Major intersections ==
County	Location	mi	km	Destinations	Notes
Ohio River		0.000– 0.904	0.000– 1.455	US 51 north / US 60 west / US 62 west	Continuation into Cairo, Illinois
Ohio River		0.000– 0.904	0.000– 1.455	Cairo Ohio River Bridge	
Ballard	Wickliffe	4.653	7.488	US 60 east (4th Street) / Great River Road (Eastern Route) to I-24	East end of concurrency with US 60
Ballard	Wickliffe	4.921	7.920	KY 121 south (Court Street) to KY 286 – Mayfield, Paducah	Northern terminus of KY 121
Carlisle		10.100	16.254	KY 1203 south	Northern terminus of KY 1203
Carlisle		10.315	16.600	KY 1022 south	Northern terminus of KY 1022
Carlisle	Bardwell	13.079	21.049	US 51 south (Elm Street) – Clinton, Fulton	East end of concurrency with US 51
Carlisle		14.159	22.787	KY 1372 south	Northern terminus of KY 1372
Carlisle		15.965	25.693	KY 1181 south	Northern terminus of KY 1181
Carlisle		18.145	29.202	KY 408 east	Western terminus of KY 408
Carlisle		19.147	30.814	KY 121 – Wickliffe, Mayfield	
Carlisle	Cunningham	20.657	33.244	KY 1820 east	Western terminus of KY 1820
Carlisle		22.011	35.423	KY 307 south	Northern terminus of KY 307
Carlisle	Scotts Corner	24.242	39.014	KY 1628 west	Eastern terminus of KY 1628
Carlisle		25.636	41.257	KY 1820	
Ballard	Lovelaceville	27.371	44.049	KY 1837 west (Blandville Road)	West end of KY 1837 overlap
Ballard	Lovelaceville	27.460	44.193	KY 1367 north (Hamburg Road)	Southern terminus of KY 1367
Ballard	Lovelaceville	27.613	44.439	KY 1837 east (Lovelaceville Road)	East end of KY 1837 overlap
McCracken		29.347	47.229	KY 726 north (McKendree Church Road)	Southern terminus of KY 726
McCracken		29.958	48.213	KY 1322 (Harris Road)	
McCracken		31.063	49.991	KY 286 west – Wickliffe	Eastern terminus of KY 286
McCracken	Camelia	32.513	52.325	KY 305 east (Fisher Road)	Western terminus of KY 305
McCracken		34.533	55.575	KY 786 north (Buchanan Road)	West end of KY 786 overlap
McCracken		34.796	55.999	KY 786 south (Mayfield-Metropolis Road)	East end of KY 786 overlap
McCracken	Paducah	36.602	58.905	KY 998 north (Olivet Church Road)	Southern terminus of KY 998
McCracken	Paducah	37.338	60.090	KY 970 south (Highland Church Road)	Northern terminus of KY 970
McCracken	Paducah	38.548	62.037	KY 1286 (North Friendship Road)	
McCracken	Paducah	39.574	63.688	To I-24 east / US 45 – Lone Oak, Mayfield, Kentucky Dam, Nashville	Jack Paxton Drive; ramp from I-24 east (exit 7) and southbound connector road to US 45 and I-24. Ramp to I-24 east directly south at US 45 intersection
McCracken	Paducah	39.866	64.158	I-24 west – St. Louis	I-24 west exit 7; access to I-24 east via Jack Paxton Drive to the west; northbound connector road from US 45 and I-24 west to the south
McCracken	Paducah	40.855	65.750	US 45 south (Lone Oak Road) / KY 731 north – Mayfield	Southern terminus of KY 731; west end of US 45 concurrency
McCracken	Paducah	41.231	66.355	US 45 north / US 60 west (South 28th Street)	East end of US 45 concurrency; west end of US 60 concurrency
McCracken	Paducah	42.129	67.800	KY 994 south (Mayfield Road)	Northern terminus of KY 994
McCracken	Paducah	44.153	71.057	KY 284 east (Bridge Street)	Western terminus of KY 284
McCracken	Paducah	45.381	73.034	KY 1954 east (Puryear Drive) / US 60 Bus. west (Wayne Sullivan Drive) / I-24 BL	Western terminus of KY 1954; eastern terminus of US 60 business route
McCracken	Reidland	47.135	75.856	Business access	Interchange; former US 60 east; closed to thru traffic
McCracken	Reidland	47.850	77.007	US 60 east	East end of US 60 concurrency
McCracken	Reidland	48.425	77.932	KY 131 south – Reidland	Interchange; no westbound exit
McCracken	Reidland	48.890	78.681	KY 1887 west	Eastern terminus of KY 1887
McCracken	Reidland	49.436	79.560	KY 787	
McCracken	Reidland	49.322	79.376	US 68 to I-24 – Benton, Kenlake, Hopkinsville	Western terminus of US 68
McCracken	Reidland	49.436	79.560	KY 787 north (Calvert Drive)	West end of KY 787 overlap
McCracken	Reidland	49.550	79.743	KY 787 south (Old Calvert City Road)	East end of KY 787 overlap
McCracken		50.218	80.818	KY 1201 (Culp Road)	
Marshall		51.562	82.981	KY 1042 west (Sharpe School Road)	Eastern terminus of KY 1042
Marshall	Possum Trot	53.704	86.428	KY 1610 west (Mt. Moriah Road)	Eastern terminus of KY 1610
Marshall		55.284	88.971	KY 1413 south (Alamo Road)	Northern terminus of KY 1413
Marshall		55.922	89.998	KY 1523 east (Industrial Parkway)	Western terminus of KY 1523
Marshall	Calvert City	57.089	91.876	KY 3456 south (Needmore Road)	Northern terminus of KY 3456
Marshall	Calvert City	57.904	93.187	KY 95 (South Main Street)	
Marshall	Calvert City	58.322	93.860	KY 1523 east (Oak Park Boulevard) to I-24 / I-69 – Benton, Mayfield, Fulton, Paducah, Nashville	Western terminus of KY 1523
Marshall	Calvert City	58.404	93.992	KY 2602 south (Paris Road)	Northern terminus of KY 2602
Marshall	Calvert City	59.405– 59.609	95.603– 95.931	I-24 / I-69 – Paducah, Nashville	I-24/I-69 exit 27
Marshall		641.345	1,032.145	KY 282 north (Gilbertsville Highway) / US 641 south – Kentucky Dam Village State Resort Park, Murray, Gilbertsville	Parclo interchange; west end of US 641 overlap; southern terminus of KY 282
Tennessee River		62.551– 62.847	100.666– 101.142	George "Tony" Ellis Memorial Bridge	
Livingston		64.017– 64.114	103.025– 103.181	KY 453 (Dover Road) – Grand Rivers, Land Between the Lakes, Smithland	interchange
Livingston	Lake City	64.540	103.867	KY 952 south (JH O'Bryan Avenue)	Northern terminus of KY 952
Livingston		65.477	105.375	KY 917 north – Barkley Dam	Southern terminus of KY 917; road to dam directly south of intersection
Cumberland River		65.659– 65.936	105.668– 106.114	Truss bridge	
Lyon	Suwanee			KY 810 north	West end of KY 810 overlap
Lyon	Suwanee	69.478	111.814	KY 810 south	East end of KY 810 overlap
Lyon		71.838	115.612	KY 295 north (Lake Barkley Drive) / KY 93 north	Southern terminus of KY 295; west end of KY 93 overlap
Lyon		72.202	116.198	KY 6011 east (Mary Blue Road)	Western terminus of KY 6011
Lyon		72.342– 72.625	116.423– 116.879	I-24 / I-69 – Nashville, Princeton, Elizabethtown, Paducah	I-24/I-69 exit 40
Lyon	Eddyville	73.890	118.914	KY 295 – Kuttawa	
Lyon	Eddyville	73.978	119.056	KY 373 north	Southern terminus of KY 373
Lyon	Eddyville	74.661	120.155	KY 93 south – Mineral Mound State Park	East end of KY 93 overlap
Lyon	Eddyville	76.216	122.658	KY 3305 south / US 641 north – Fredonia, Marion, Western Kentucky Correctional Complex	East end of US 641 overlap; northern terminus of KY 3305
Lyon	Eddyville	77.706	125.056	KY 3171 north	Southern terminus of KY 3171
Lyon	Eddyville	77.812– 78.147	125.226– 125.765	I-69 to I-24 – Paducah, Elizabethtown	I-69 exit 71
Lyon		79.640	128.168	KY 818 south	Northern terminus of KY 818
Caldwell	Princeton			KY 91 / KY 139 north (Marion Road) to I-69 – Marion, Elizabethtown, Paducah	East end of KY 91/KY 139 overlap
Caldwell	Princeton	86.871– 86.962	139.805– 139.952	KY 139 / KY 293 south (Jefferson Street south) / KY 91 south	Court Square; east end of KY 91/KY 139 overlap; west end of KY 293 overlap
Caldwell	Princeton	87.270	140.447	KY 293 north (Jefferson Street north) to I-69	East end of KY 293 overlap
Caldwell	Princeton	87.658	141.072	KY 3314 west (East Young Street)	Eastern terminus of KY 3114
Caldwell		93.287	150.131	KY 1627 south (Jones-Keeney Road)	Northern terminus of KY 1627
Caldwell		98.134	157.931	KY 672 south	Northern terminus of KY 672
Hopkins	Dawson Springs	99.031	159.375	KY 109 south (South Main Street)	West end of KY 109 overlap
Hopkins	Dawson Springs	99.944	160.844	KY 109 (South Main Street) to I-69 – Beulah, Providence	East end of KY 109 overlap
Hopkins		103.154	166.010	KY 112 north (Ilsley Road)	Southern terminus of KY 112
Hopkins		105.060	169.078	KY 1138 south (Union Temple Road)	Northern terminus of KY 1338
Hopkins	St. Charles	107.304	172.689	KY 454 north (Railroad Street)	Southern terminus of KY 454
Hopkins		110.112	177.208	KY 1687 south (Daniel Boone Road)	Northern terminus of KY 1687
Hopkins		110.591	177.979	KY 2272 north (Crossroads Church Road)	Southern terminus of KY 2272
Hopkins	Nortonville	113.268	182.287	KY 2083 (North Main Street)	
Hopkins	Nortonville	113.510	182.677	US 41 (Hopkinsville Road)	
Hopkins		113.779– 113.965	183.110– 183.409	I-169 to I-69 / Western Kentucky Parkway – Hopkinsville, Madisonville	I-169 exit 33
Hopkins	White Plains	118.137	190.123	KY 813	
Muhlenberg		123.531	198.804	KY 175 south	West end of KY 175 overlap
Muhlenberg		124.809	200.861	KY 175 north to Western Kentucky Parkway – Elizabethtown, Paducah, Graham	East end of KY 175 overlap
Muhlenberg		129.133	207.819	KY 189	
Muhlenberg	Greenville	130.159	209.471	KY 171 south	Northern terminus of KY 171; Muhlenberg Community Hospital just west of intersection
Muhlenberg	Greenville	130.751	210.423	KY 181 south (South Main Street)	West end of KY 181 overlap
Muhlenberg	Greenville	130.894	210.653	KY 176 east (East Main Cross Street)	Western terminus of KY 176
Muhlenberg	Greenville	131.708	211.963	KY 181 north (West Depot Street)	East end of KY 181 overlap
Muhlenberg	Greenville	132.739	213.623	KY 189 Conn. east to KY 189	Connector road to KY 189
Muhlenberg	Powderly	135.020	217.294	KY 189 south (Robert L Draper Way)	Northern terminus of KY 189
Muhlenberg				KY 2691 east (Willow Glen Road)	Western terminus of KY 2691
Muhlenberg	Central City	136.824	220.197	US 431 north / KY 70 west (Philip Stone Way)	West end of US 431/KY 70 overlap
Muhlenberg	Central City	136.909	220.334	KY 277 north (West Reservoir Avenue)	Southern terminus of KY 277
Muhlenberg	Central City	137.692	221.594	KY 2103 north (Ash Street)	Southern terminus of KY 2103
Muhlenberg	Central City	138.283	222.545	KY 1031 north / US 431 south / KY 70 east (South 2nd Street) to Western Kentucky Parkway – Russellville	Southern terminus of KY 1031; west end of US 431/KY 70 overlap
Muhlenberg	Central City	139.573	224.621	KY 604 south	Northern terminus of KY 604
Muhlenberg		142.875	229.935	KY 1379 north	Southern terminus of KY 1379
Muhlenberg		145.079	233.482	KY 2696 east	Western terminus of KY 2696
Green River		146.156– 146.504	235.215– 235.775	Bridge	
Ohio	Rockport	146.681	236.060	KY 1903 north (Rockport-Ceralvo Road)	Southern terminus of KY 1903
Ohio	Rockport	148.068	238.292	KY 1245 north	Southern terminus of KY 1245
Ohio		148.839	239.533	KY 85 west	Eastern terminus of KY 85
Ohio	McHenry	152.909	246.083	KY 1245 south	Northern terminus of KY 1245
Ohio		155.147	249.685	KY 2670 south (Highland Drive)	Northern terminus of KY 2670
Ohio	Beaver Dam	156.089	251.201	US 231 (South Main Street) to Western Kentucky Parkway – Morgantown	West end of US 231 overlap
Ohio	Beaver Dam	156.583	251.996	KY 273 west (West 7th Street)	Eastern terminus of KY 273
Ohio	Beaver Dam	156.948	252.583	US 231 north (Hartford Road) – Hartford	East end of US 231 overlap
Ohio		159.119	256.077	KY 1543 west	Eastern terminus of KY 1543
Ohio		159.338	256.430	KY 6117 east (Rob Roy Road)	Western terminus of KY 6117
Ohio	Rosine	165.268	265.973	KY 1544 north	Southern terminus of KY 1544
Ohio		166.155	267.401	KY 505 south	West end of KY 505 overlap
Ohio		168.015	270.394	KY 505 north (Dan Road)	East end of KY 505 overlap
Ohio	Horse Branch	169.006	271.989	KY 1583 east (Horse Branch Loop)	Western terminus of KY 1583
Ohio	Horse Branch	169.536	272.842	KY 1583 west (Horse Branch Loop)	Eastern terminus of KY 1583
Grayson	Do Stop	177.551	285.741	KY 736	
Grayson	Caneyville	181.027	291.335	KY 79 (Main Street) to KY 185 south / Western Kentucky Parkway	KY 185's northern terminus is located less than 0.1 miles (0.16 km) south of this intersection.
Grayson	Milwood	187.076	301.070	KY 2193 north (Kefhauver Road)	Southern terminus of KY 2193
Grayson		190.377	306.382	KY 2777 north (Ray Priddy Road)	Southern terminus of KY 2777
Grayson	Leitchfield	191.260	307.803	KY 187 south (Shrewsbury Road)	Northern terminus of KY 187
Grayson	Leitchfield	193.095	310.756	KY 259 south (South Main Street south) to Western Kentucky Parkway	West end of KY 259 overlap
Grayson	Leitchfield	193.258– 193.313	311.019– 311.107	KY 54 west / East Main Street	Public Square; eastern terminus of KY 54
Grayson	Leitchfield	193.604	311.575	KY 259 north (North Main Street north) – Harned, Hardinsburg	East end of KY 259 overlap
Grayson	Leitchfield	193.906	312.061	KY 920 east (Salt River Road)	Western terminus of KY 920
Grayson	Leitchfield	194.321	312.729	KY 1214 south (Grayson Springs Road)	Northern terminus of KY 1214
Grayson	Leitchfield			KY 3155 (William Thomason Byway)	Twin Lakes Regional Medical Center to the south
Grayson	Clarkson	197.557	317.937	KY 88 south (Peonia Road) – Peonia, Munfordville	Northern terminus of KY 88
Grayson	Clarkson	197.694	318.158	KY 2191 north (North Patterson Street)	Southern terminus of KY 2191
Grayson	Clarkson	197.771	318.282	KY 224 east (East Main Street) to Western Kentucky Parkway	Western terminus of KY 224
Grayson		202.547	325.968	KY 720 west (St. Paul Road) – St. Paul	West end of KY 720 overlap
Grayson	Big Clifty	203.524	327.540	KY 720 east (Spurrier Road)	East end of KY 720 overlap
Hardin		210.311	338.463	KY 84 (Sonora-Hardin Springs Road) to Western Kentucky Parkway	
Hardin		215.402	346.656	KY 1375 (Long Grove Road)	
Hardin		216.133	347.832	KY 222 east (West Glendale-Hodgenville Road)	Western terminus of KY 222
Hardin		218.318	351.349	KY 86 west (East Main Street) – Cecelia	Eastern terminus of KY 86
Hardin	Elizabethtown	220.415	354.724	KY 3005 (Ring Road) to I-65 / Western Kentucky Parkway	
Hardin	Elizabethtown	221.027	355.708	KY 1904 west (Bacon Creek Road)	Eastern terminus of KY 1904
Hardin	Elizabethtown	223.148– 223.327	359.122– 359.410	US 31W Byp. / US 62 Truck east to I-65 / Western Kentucky Parkway – Fort Knox, Radcliff	Interchange
Hardin	Elizabethtown	223.800	360.171	US 31W (West Dixie Avenue) / KY 61 south (East Dixie Avenue) to I-65 / Western Kentucky Parkway	West end of KY 61 north overlap
Hardin	Elizabethtown	255.386	411.004	KY 3005 west (Ring Road)	Eastern terminus of KY 3005
Hardin	Elizabethtown	225.890– 226.033	363.535– 363.765	I-65 / US 62 Truck west to Bluegrass Parkway – Nashville, Louisville	I-65 exit 94
Hardin	Younger Creek	232.731	374.544	KY 583 south (Youngers Creek Road) to Bluegrass Parkway west	Northern terminus of KY 583
Rolling Fork		233.992– 234.132	376.574– 376.799	Bridge over Rolling Fork	
Nelson		235.167	378.465	KY 52 east (Nelsonville Road) to Bluegrass Parkway	Western terminus of KY 52
Nelson	Boston	236.466	380.555	KY 61 north (Lebanon Junction Road) to I-65 – Shepherdsville	East end of KY 61 overlap
Nelson		237.068	381.524	KY 733	
Nelson	Cravens	244.197	392.997	KY 733 west (Bellwood Road)	Eastern terminus of KY 733
Nelson		244.696	393.800	KY 2737 north (Ben Irvin Road)	
Nelson	Bardstown	248.303	399.605	US 31E south (Cathedral Manor) to Bluegrass Parkway – Kentucky Railway Museum	West end of US 31E concurrency; Basilica of St. Joseph Proto-Cathedral on opposite side of 62 and Bethlehem High School is on the corner
Nelson	Bardstown	248.482	399.893	US 150 east	West end of US 150 overlap; beginning of roundabout around the courthouse
Nelson	Bardstown	248.528	399.967	US 31E north / US 150 west (Court Square)	East end of 31E concurrency; 150 west follows 31E, 150 east continues to follow 62
Nelson	Bardstown	248.917	400.593	US 150 east (East Stephen Foster Avenue) to Bluegrass Parkway – My Old Kentucky Home State Park	East end of US 150 overlap; state park amphitheater at this intersection
Nelson	Bardstown	250.173	402.614	KY 245 (East John Rowan Boulevard)	
Nelson	Bardstown	251.488	404.731	KY 605 south (Woodlawn Road)	Northern terminus of KY 605
Nelson		252.331	406.087	KY 162 east (Old Bloomfield Road)	Western terminus of KY 162
Nelson		254.395	409.409	KY 1858 east (Stringtown Road)	Western terminus of KY 1858
Nelson		256.535	412.853	KY 2230 south (Milton Brown Road)	Northern terminus of KY 2230
Nelson		257.083	413.735	KY 55 south (Springfield-Bloomfield Road) to Bluegrass Parkway	West end of KY 55 overlap
Nelson	Bloomfield	259.380	417.432	KY 48 west (Bardstown Road) / KY 55 north (Taylorsville Road)	East end of KY 55 overlap; eastern terminus of KY 48; 48 to the west, 55 to the north; lake via 55
Nelson	Bloomfield	260.701	419.558	KY 1066 north	Southern terminus of KY 1066
Nelson		263.040	423.322	KY 458 north (Chaplin-Taylorsville Road)	West end of KY 458 overlap
Nelson		263.556	424.152	KY 2738 south (Tunnel Mill Road)	Northern terminus of KY 2738
Nelson		264.435	425.567	KY 1873 north (Ashes Creek Road)	Southern terminus of KY 1873
Nelson	Chaplin	264.994	426.467	KY 458 south (Old Tunnel Mill Road)	East end of KY 458 overlap
Anderson		269.313	433.417	KY 3358 north (Fairmount Road)	Southern terminus of KY 3358
Anderson		270.381	435.136	KY 555 south (Terrell Ridge Road) to Bluegrass Parkway	Northern terminus of KY 555
Anderson		272.354	438.311	KY 248 north (Terrell Ridge Road) – Taylorsville	Southern terminus of KY 248
Anderson		273.491	440.141	KY 1291 south (Fairview Road)	Northern terminus of KY 1291
Anderson		277.823	447.113	KY 53 north (Bruner Road)	West end of KY 53 overlap
Anderson		279.542	449.879	KY 53 south (Willisburg Road) to Bluegrass Parkway – Springfield	East end of KY 53 overlap
Anderson		281.326	452.750	KY 749 south (High Grove Road)	West end of KY 749 overlap
Anderson		281.386	452.847	KY 749 north (Beaver Lake Road)	East end of KY 749 overlap
Anderson		283.722	456.606	KY 513 east (Mill Creek Pike)	Western terminus of KY 513
Anderson	Lawrenceburg	287.584	462.822	US 127 Byp. / US 62 Truck east to Bluegrass Parkway – Frankfort, Harrodsburg	Truck route via northbound 127 bypass; Anderson County High School at this intersection
Anderson	Lawrenceburg	288.665	464.561	US 127 south (South Main Street)	West end of US 127 overlap
Anderson	Lawrenceburg	289.201	465.424	US 127 north (North Main Street) / KY 44 west / US 62 Truck west (West Woodfoord Street) – Frankfort, Shelbyville	East end of US 127 overlap; eastern terminus of KY 44 and US 62 truck route
Anderson		291.495	469.116	KY 1510 south (Tyrone Road)	Northern terminus of KY 1510
Kentucky River		292.088– 292.327	470.070– 470.455	Jo Blackburn Bridge	
Woodford	Milner	294.964	474.699	KY 1685 north (Steele Road)	Southern terminus of KY 1685
Woodford	Versailles	297.489	478.762	KY 2113 south (Falling Springs Boulevard)	Northern terminus of KY 2113; access to Woodford County Fairgrounds and Bluegrass Railroad Museum
Woodford	Versailles	298.765	480.816	KY 1964 north (Clifton Road)	West end of KY 1964 overlap
Woodford	Versailles	299.046	481.268	KY 1964 south (High Street)	East end of KY 1964 overlap
Woodford	Versailles	299.121	481.389	KY 33 south (South Main Street) to Bluegrass Parkway	Northern terminus of KY 33
Woodford	Versailles	299.219	481.546	US 60 Bus. east (Lexington Road) to US 60	West end of US 60 concurrency
Woodford	Versailles	299.456	481.928	KY 1659 north (Elm Street)	Southern terminus of KY 1659
Woodford	Versailles	300.179	483.091	US 60 east to Bluegrass Parkway – Lexington	Eastern terminus of US 60 Business route; west end of US 60 concurrency
Woodford	Versailles	300.547	483.684	US 60 west to I-64 – Frankfort, Louisville, Woodford Reserve Distillery, Buckley Wildlife Sanctuary	East end of US 60 concurrency
Woodford		304.802	490.531	KY 1681 (Old Frankfort Pike) – Frankfort, Lexington	
Woodford	Midway	307.616	495.060	US 421 north (Leestown Road west)	West end of US 421 overlap
Woodford	Midway	307.851	495.438	KY 341 north (Georgetown Road) to I-64 – Lexington, Louisville, Frankfort	
Scott		310.783	500.157	US 421 south (Leestown Road south) – Lexington	East end of US 421 overlap
Scott		312.631– 312.886	503.131– 503.541	I-64 – Lexington, Frankfort	I-64 exit 69
Scott		313.928	505.218	KY 1973 (Ironworks Road)	
Scott	Georgetown	315.901	508.393	US 460 Byp. west (McClelland Circle)	West end of US 460 Byp. overlap
Scott	Georgetown	317.651	511.210	US 25 (Lexington Road) – Lexington, Georgetown, Georgetown College	College and Georgetown Community Hospital to the north
Scott	Georgetown	319.392	514.012	KY 1962 east (Lemons Mill Road)	Western terminus of KY 1962
Scott	Georgetown	320.542	515.862	US 460 Byp. ends / US 460 (Paris Pike) to I-75 south – Paris, Georgetown, Evans Orchard & Cider Mill	Eastern terminus of US 460 Byp.; east end of US 460 Byp. overlap; Georgetown-Scott County Airport to the east
Scott	Georgetown	320.943	516.508	KY 32 east (Champion Way) – The Pavilion Indoor Recreation Center, Visitor Center	Western terminus of KY 32
Scott	Georgetown	321.195– 321.460	516.913– 517.340	I-75 – Lexington, Cincinnati	I-75 Exit 126
Scott	Georgetown	321.745	517.798	KY 2906 south (Connector Road)	Northern terminus of KY 2906
Scott	Georgetown	322.719	519.366	KY 3552 west (Lexus Way)	Eastern terminus of KY 3552
Scott	Georgetown	325.130	523.246	KY 3487 north – Toyota Motor Manufacturing Kentucky	Southern terminus of KY 3487
Scott		325.130	523.246	KY 922 (Muddy Fork Road)	
Bourbon	No major junctions				
Harrison		330.459	531.822	KY 1842 north (Newtown-Leesburg Road)	Southern terminus of KY 1842
Harrison	Broadwell	334.773	538.765	KY 353 south	Northern terminus of KY 353
Harrison		335.953	540.664	KY 982 north	Southern terminus of KY 982
Harrison		338.253	544.365	US 27 south / US 27 Bus. north – Paris, Cynthiana	Roundabout; southern terminus of US 27 Bus.; west end of US 27 concurrency
Harrison	Cynthiana	338.864	545.349	KY 32	
Harrison	Cynthiana	340.112	547.357	KY 356	
Harrison	Cynthiana	340.984	548.761	KY 36	Interchange via connector road
Harrison	Cynthiana	341.811	550.091	US 27 north (Falmouth Road) / US 27 Bus. begins – Falmouth	East end of US 27 concurrency; northern terminus of US 27 Bus.; west end of concurrency with US 27 Bus.
Harrison	Cynthiana	342.365	550.983	US 27 Bus. south (Main Street south)	East end of US 27 Bus. concurrency
Harrison	Cynthiana	343.544	552.880	KY 392 east	Western terminus of KY 392
Harrison	Oddville	354.674	570.792	KY 1284 west	Eastern terminus of KY 1284
Harrison–Robertson county line		335.336	539.671	KY 19 north – Brooksville, Augusta	Southern terminus of KY 19
Robertson		356.038	572.988	KY 1504 east (Central Ridge Road)	Western terminus of KY 1504
Robertson		359.623	578.757	KY 3198 north (Louderback Lane)	Southern terminus of KY 3198
Robertson		360.362	579.946	KY 617 east (Piqua-Kentontown Road)	Western terminus of KY 617
Robertson		364.621	586.801	KY 1504 west (Central Ridge Road)	Eastern terminus of KY 1504
Robertson		364.785	587.065	KY 539 north (Pinhook Road)	Southern terminus of KY 165
Robertson	Mt. Olivet	365.593	588.365	KY 165 north (Oakland Road)	West end of KY 165 overlap
Robertson	Mt. Olivet	365.846	588.772	KY 165 south (South Main Street)	East end of KY 165 overlap
Robertson		367.438	591.334	KY 616 north (Wolf Run Road)	West end of KY 616 overlap
Robertson		376.565	606.023	KY 616 south (Mt. Pleasant Road)	East end of KY 616 overlap
Mason		372.341	599.225	KY 1029 south (Myers Road)	Northern terminus of KY 1029
Mason		374.302	602.381	KY 324 east (Raymond Road)	Western terminus of KY 324
Mason		375.856	604.882	KY 596 north	Southern terminus of KY 596
Mason	Maysville	383.446	617.097	US 68 Bus. west (Officer Danny Hay Memorial Highway) / KY 1236 east (Duke of York Street) – Paris	Eastern terminus of US 68 Bus.; western terminus of KY 1236
Mason	Maysville	384.155	618.238	KY 2515 (Clarks Run Road)	
Mason	Maysville	385.161	619.857	AA Hwy (KY 9) / KY 10 west – Brooksville, Vanceburg	West end of KY 10 overlap
Mason	Maysville	385.979	621.173	KY 1448 south (West Maple Leaf Road)	Northern terminus of KY 1448
Mason	Maysville	386.442	621.918	KY 2516 east (Lexington Pike)	Western terminus of KY 2516
Mason	Maysville	387.711	623.960	KY 11 south (Fleming Road)	Northern terminus of KY 11; Mason County Detention Center is at this intersection
Mason	Maysville	388.008	624.438	KY 10 east (Forest Avenue)	East end of KY 10 overlap
Mason	Maysville	388.157	624.678	KY 2513 east (Bridge Street) – Historic District	Western terminus of KY 2513
Mason	Maysville	388.265	624.852	KY 8 west (3rd Street west)	Eastern terminus of KY 8
Ohio River		388.301– 388.795	624.910– 625.705	Simon Kenton Memorial Bridge	
Ohio River		388.301– 388.795	624.910– 625.705	US 62 east	Continuation into Aberdeen, Ohio
1.000 mi = 1.609 km; 1.000 km = 0.621 mi: Concurrency terminus; Incomplete access

== Memorial names ==
From the KY 189 junction to the eastern city limits in Central City, US 62 is known as Everly Brothers Boulevard, in honor of the country music duo who were born and raised in the area.

== Related routes ==
- Kentucky Route 293
- U.S. Route 27 Business (Cynthiana, Kentucky)
- U.S. Route 62 Truck (Elizabethtown, Kentucky)
- U.S. Route 62 Truck (Lawrenceburg, Kentucky)

== See also ==
U.S. Route 62
Previous state: Illinois	Kentucky	Next state: Ohio
