= Kentucky Route 245 =

State highway in Kentucky, United States

Kentucky Route 245
- KY 245 highlighted in red

Route information
- Maintained by KYTC
- Length: 19.439 mi (31.284 km)

Major junctions
- South end: US 150 in Bardstown
- US 62 in Bardstown US 31E / US 150 in Bardstown I-65 near Shepherdsville
- North end: KY 61 near Shepherdsville

Location
- Country: United States
- State: Kentucky
- Counties: Nelson, Bullitt

Highway system
- Kentucky State Highway System; Interstate; US; State; Parkways
← KY 244	→ KY 246

Kentucky Route 245 (KY 245) is a 19.439-mile (31.284 km) state highway in Kentucky that runs from U.S. Route 150 in southeastern to Bardstown to Kentucky Route 61 south of Shepherdsville. It is considered part of the State Primary System.

== Route description ==
The highway begins at US 150 on the east-southeast side of Bardstown, just west of US 150's junction with the Bluegrass Parkway. It then serves as a northern bypass of Bardstown, intersecting US 62 and US 150 again, this time in an overlap with US 31E. From there, it travels primarily northwestward, passing along the northern side of the Bernheim Arboretum and Research Forest. It then intersects with I-65 at exit 112 south of Shepherdsville before ending at KY 61.

== Points of interest ==
- Thomas Nelson High School
- Rooster Run general store
- Jim Beam distillery
- Bernheim Forest

== History ==
The highway was established as an unimproved JY 332 when the state's highway system began. It was redesignated as KY 245 at some point between 1940 and 1957.

== Major intersections ==
County	Location	mi	km	Destinations	Notes
Nelson	Bardstown	0.000	0.000	US 150 (Springfield Road) to Bluegrass Parkway	Southern terminus
Nelson	Bardstown	2.334	3.756	US 62 (Bloomfield Road)	
Nelson	Bardstown	3.342	5.378	US 31E / US 150 (North Third Street)	
Nelson		5.150	8.288	KY 1430 south / Wedgewood Drive	Northern terminus of KY 1430
Nelson		6.529	10.507	KY 332 east (Old Nazareth Road) / Stonehouse Road	Western terminus of KY 332
Nelson		8.681	13.971	KY 509 east (Samuels Loop) / Hall Loop	Western terminus of KY 509
Nelson		10.074	16.213	KY 523 north (Deatsville Road) / Marr Lane	Southern terminus of KY 523
Bullitt		13.294	21.395	KY 1604 north	Southern terminus of KY 1604
Bullitt		17.590	28.308	KY 3219 west	Eastern terminus of KY 3219
Bullitt		18.759– 18.846	30.190– 30.330	I-65 – Louisville, Elizabethtown	I-65 exit 112
Bullitt		19.439	31.284	KY 61	Northern terminus
1.000 mi = 1.609 km; 1.000 km = 0.621 mi
