= Ballardsville, Kentucky =

Unincorporated community in Kentucky, United States

Coordinates: 38.36139°N 85.34583°W

Ballardsville is an unincorporated community in Oldham County, Kentucky, United States. It is a small unincorporated community that lies a few miles south of La Grange on KY 53.

The community bears the name of a local family.
