= Willisburg Lake =

- West end of Willisburg Lake

- Location within Kentucky
- Location: Washington County, Kentucky
- Coordinates: 37°49′35″N 85°9′30″W
- Type: reservoir
- Primary outflows: Lick Creek
- Basin countries: United States
- Surface area: 126 acres (51 ha)
- Surface elevation: 920 feet (280 m)

Willisburg Lake is a 126-acre (0.51 km^{2}) reservoir in Washington County, Kentucky. It was created in 1969. Access Off Hwy. KY 555 At Boat Docks
