= Texas, Kentucky =

Unincorporated community in Kentucky, United States

- Unincorporated community
- Location within Kentucky Location within the United States
- Coordinates: 37°39′20″N 85°06′37″W
- Country: United States
- State: Kentucky
- County: Washington
- Elevation: 879 ft (268 m)
- Time zone: UTC-5 (Eastern (EST))
  - Summer (DST): UTC-4 (EDT)
- GNIS feature ID: 505101

Texas is an unincorporated community in Washington County, in the U.S. state of Kentucky.

== History ==
A post office called Texas was established in 1853, and remained in operation until 1964. The community was named after the state of Texas.
