= Beaver Lake (Kentucky) =

- Aerial view of the northern end

- Location within Kentucky Location within the United States
- Location: Anderson County, Kentucky
- Coordinates: 37°57′49″N 85°01′21″W
- Type: artificial lake
- Basin countries: United States
- Surface area: 158 acres (64 ha)
- Surface elevation: 784 ft (239 m)

Beaver Lake is a 158 acres (64 ha) reservoir in Anderson County, Kentucky. Created in 1963, it is owned by the Kentucky Department of Fish and Wildlife Resources.
