= Brush Grove, Kentucky =

Unincorporated community in Kentucky, United States

- Unincorporated community
- Location within Kentucky
- Coordinates: 37°50′35″N 85°10′49″W
- Country: United States
- State: Kentucky
- County: Washington
- Elevation: 810 ft (250 m)
- Time zone: UTC-5 (Eastern (EST))
  - Summer (DST): UTC-4 (EDT)
- Area code: 859
- GNIS feature ID: 507600

Brush Grove is an unincorporated community in Washington County, Kentucky, United States.

== Geography ==
Brush Grove is located in northern Washington County along Kentucky Route 1796, 3.75 miles (6.04 km) northwest of Willisburg.
