= Wellington, Kentucky =

- City
- Location of Wellington in Jefferson County, Kentucky

- Location within the state of Kentucky Wellington (the United States)
- Coordinates: 38°13′00″N 85°40′13″W
- Country: United States
- State: Kentucky
- County: Jefferson

Area
  - Total: 0.093 sq mi (0.24 km^{2})
  - Land: 0.093 sq mi (0.24 km^{2})
  - Water: 0 sq mi (0.00 km^{2})
- Elevation: 499 ft (152 m)

Population (2020)
  - Total: 564
  - Density: 6,185.1/sq mi (2,388.09/km^{2})
- Time zone: UTC-5 (Eastern (EST))
  - Summer (DST): UTC-4 (EDT)
- ZIP Code: 40205
- FIPS code: 21-81372
- GNIS feature ID: 2405704
- Website: cityofwellingtonky.com

Wellington is a home rule-class city in metro Louisville, Jefferson County, Kentucky, United States. It is considered to be part of the Upper Highlands section of Louisville. It was incorporated in 1946. As of the 2020 census, Wellington had a population of 564.

== Geography ==
Wellington is located in central Jefferson County. It is surrounded by the city of Louisville. U.S. Route 150 (Bardstown Road) forms the southwest border of the community. Downtown Louisville is 6 miles (10 km) to the northwest.

According to the United States Census Bureau, Wellington has a total area of 0.09 square miles (0.24 km^{2}), all land.

== Demographics ==
Historical population
Census	Pop.	Note	%±
1950	656		—
1960	804		22.6%
1970	727		−9.6%
1980	653		−10.2%
1990	593		−9.2%
2000	561		−5.4%
2010	565		0.7%
2020	564		−0.2%
U.S. Decennial Census

At the 2000 census, there were 561 people in 246 households, including 167 families, in the city. The population density was 6,101.5 inhabitants per square mile (2,355.8/km^{2}). There were 258 housing units at an average density of 2,806.0 per square mile (1,083.4/km^{2}). The racial makeup of the city was 97.15% White, 1.43% African American, 0.18% Native American, 0.36% Asian, 0.18% Pacific Islander, 0.36% from other races, and 0.36% from two or more races. Hispanic or Latino of any race were 2.67%.

Of the 246 households 23.6% had children under the age of 18 living with them, 56.9% were married couples living together, 8.9% had a female householder with no husband present, and 32.1% were non-families. 28.5% of households were one person and 13.0% were one person aged 65 or older. The average household size was 2.28 and the average family size was 2.77.

The age distribution was 20.7% under the age of 18, 3.4% from 18 to 24, 29.9% from 25 to 44, 28.5% from 45 to 64, and 17.5% 65 or older. The median age was 42 years. For every 100 females, there were 83.9 males. For every 100 females aged 18 and over, there were 80.2 males.

The median household income was $57,031 and the median family income was $67,500. Males had a median income of $40,625 versus $36,719 for females. The per capita income for the city was $26,235. About 1.8% of families and 1.3% of the population were below the poverty line, including 1.7% of those under age 18 and 5.8% of those age 65 or over.
