= Brodhead, Kentucky =

- City
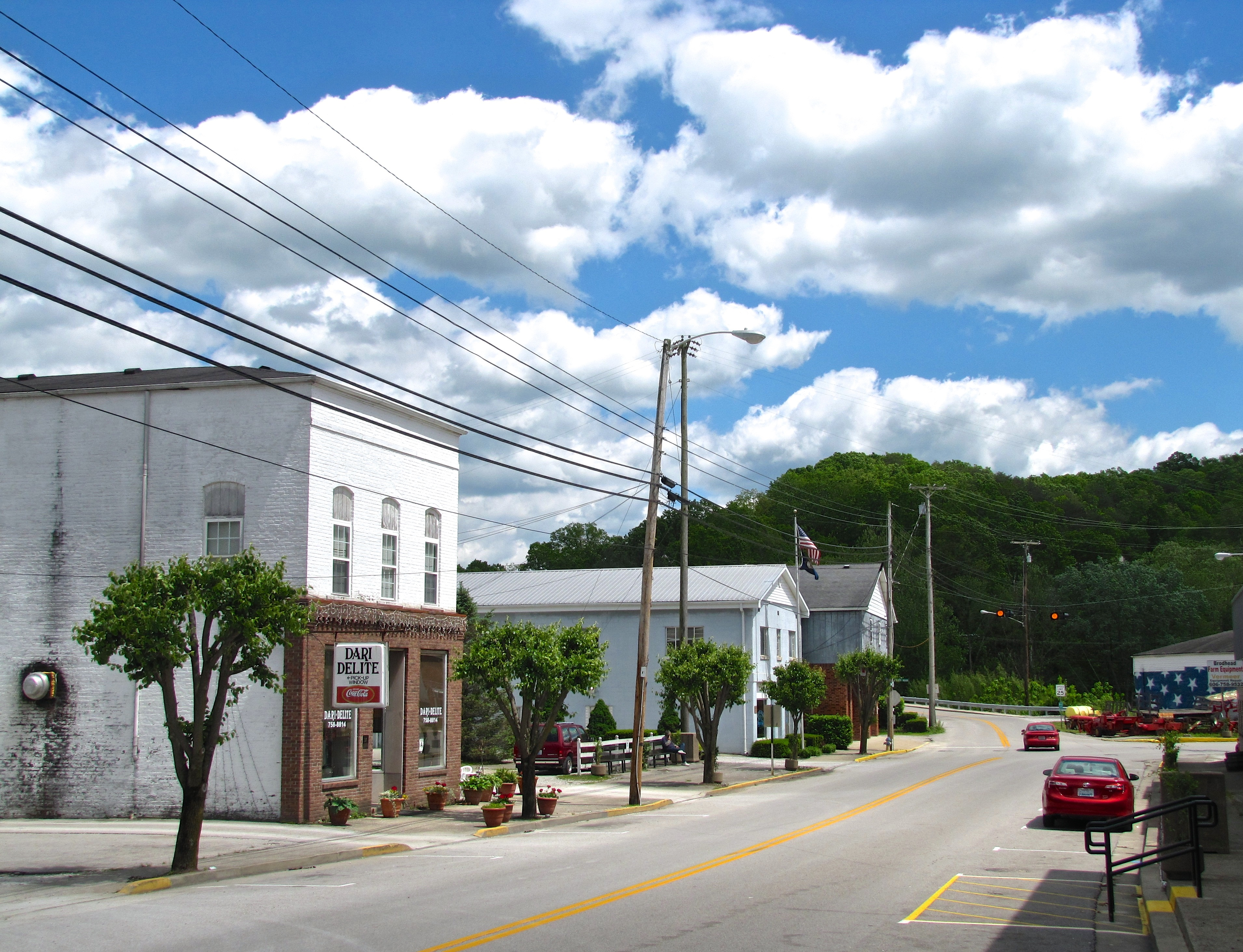
- Main Street in Brodhead

- Location of Brodhead in Rockcastle County, Kentucky.
- Coordinates: 37°24′10″N 84°24′52″W
- Country: United States
- State: Kentucky
- County: Rockcastle

Government
  - Mayor: Walter Lee Cash

Area
  - Total: 1.76 sq mi (4.56 km^{2})
  - Land: 1.75 sq mi (4.52 km^{2})
  - Water: 0.015 sq mi (0.04 km^{2})
- Elevation: 938 ft (286 m)

Population (2020)
  - Total: 1,117
  - Density: 640.0/sq mi (247.11/km^{2})
- Time zone: UTC-5 (Eastern (EST))
  - Summer (DST): UTC-4 (EDT)
- ZIP code: 40409
- Area code: 606
- FIPS code: 21-09838
- GNIS feature ID: 2403930

Brodhead is a home rule-class city in Rockcastle County in southeastern Kentucky. As of the 2020 census, Brodhead had a population of 1,117. It is part of the Richmond–Berea Micropolitan Statistical Area.

Brodhead has been noted for its unusual place name.

== History ==
What is now Brodhead was originally a stagecoach stop and drover's stable known as Stigalls Station. When the L&N Railroad reached the area in early 1868, a train station was established, and the town was given its current name. The town is believed to have been named for the contractor responsible for building the rail line in the area, or for Richard Brodhead, a U.S. senator from Pennsylvania.

== Geography ==
Brodhead lies at the headwaters of the Dix River in northwestern Rockcastle County. U.S. Route 150 passes through the western part of the city.

According to the United States Census Bureau, the city has a total area of 2.2 square miles (5.7 km^{2}), all land.

== Demographics ==
Historical population
| Census | Pop. | Note | %± |
|---|---|---|---|
| 1890 | 277 | | — |
| 1900 | 337 | | 21.7% |
| 1910 | 477 | | 41.5% |
| 1920 | 555 | | 16.4% |
| 1930 | 630 | | 13.5% |
| 1940 | 702 | | 11.4% |
| 1950 | 808 | | 15.1% |
| 1960 | 515 | | −36.3% |
| 1970 | 769 | | 49.3% |
| 1980 | 686 | | −10.8% |
| 1990 | 1,140 | | 66.2% |
| 2000 | 1,193 | | 4.6% |
| 2010 | 1,211 | | 1.5% |
| 2020 | 1,117 | | −7.8% |
U.S. Decennial Census

As of the census of 2000, there were 1,193 people, 462 households, and 307 families residing in the city. The population density was 542.1 inhabitants per square mile (209.3/km^{2}). There were 518 housing units at an average density of 235.4 per square mile (90.9/km^{2}). The racial makeup of the city was 98.91% White, 0.08% African American, 0.25% Asian, and 0.75% from two or more races. Hispanic or Latino of any race were 0.59% of the population.

There were 462 households, out of which 32.9% had children under the age of 18 living with them, 46.3% were married couples living together, 17.1% had a female householder with no husband present, and 33.5% were non-families. 31.0% of all households were made up of individuals, and 14.1% had someone living alone who was 65 years of age or older. The average household size was 2.35 and the average family size was 2.90.

In the city, the population was spread out, with 23.1% under the age of 18, 9.6% from 18 to 24, 24.3% from 25 to 44, 20.7% from 45 to 64, and 22.4% who were 65 years of age or older. The median age was 40 years. For every 100 females, there were 85.5 males. For every 100 females age 18 and over, there were 76.2 males.

The median income for a household in the city was $17,500, and the median income for a family was $25,000. Males had a median income of $25,375 versus $19,750 for females. The per capita income for the city was $15,252. About 30.7% of families and 32.8% of the population were below the poverty line, including 42.6% of those under age 18 and 30.2% of those age 65 or over.
