= Needmore, Boyle County, Kentucky =

Unincorporated community in Kentucky, United States

Needmore, Kentucky
- Unincorporated community
- Location within Kentucky
- Coordinates: 37°39′06″N 84°52′40″W
- Country: United States
- State: Kentucky
- County: Boyle
- Elevation: 938 ft (286 m)
- Time zone: UTC-5 (Eastern (EST))
  - Summer (DST): UTC-4 (EDT)
- Area code: 859
- GNIS feature ID: 499220

Needmore is an unincorporated community in Boyle County, Kentucky, United States. Needmore is located on U.S. Route 150 5.8 miles (9.3 km) west of Danville.
