= Saint Catharine, Kentucky =

Unincorporated community in Kentucky, United States

- Unincorporated community
- Location within Kentucky
- Coordinates: 37°42′31″N 85°15′28″W
- Country: United States
- State: Kentucky
- County: Washington
- Elevation: 787 ft (240 m)
- Time zone: UTC-5 (Eastern (EST))
  - Summer (DST): UTC-4 (EDT)
- ZIP code: 40061
- Area code: 859
- GNIS feature ID: 1890844

Saint Catharine (also Saint Catherine) is an unincorporated community in Washington County, Kentucky, United States. Its ZIP code is 40061.

A post office has been in operation at Saint Catharine since 1900. The community took its name from St. Catharine College.
