= Boston, Kentucky =

Census-designated place in Kentucky, United States

Boston
- Census-designated place
- Location within the state of Kentucky Boston (the United States)
- Coordinates: 37°47′02″N 85°40′49″W
- Country: United States
- State: Kentucky
- County: Nelson

Area
  - Total: 1.98 sq mi (5.13 km^{2})
  - Land: 1.96 sq mi (5.08 km^{2})
  - Water: 0.015 sq mi (0.04 km^{2})
- Elevation: 528 ft (161 m)

Population (2020)
  - Total: 253
  - Density: 128.9/sq mi (49.76/km^{2})
- Time zone: UTC-6 (Eastern (EST))
  - Summer (DST): UTC-5 (EST)
- ZIP codes: 40107
- FIPS code: 21-08722
- GNIS feature ID: 2629579

Boston is a census-designated place in Nelson County, Kentucky, United States. As of the 2020 census, Boston had a population of 253. Boston is along I-65; its ZIP code is 40107.

Boston is the home of Mount Moriah Baptist Church, organized in 1802. During 1929–1933, Mount Moriah was pastored by James L. Sullivan, who went on to be the president of the Baptist Sunday School Board (now Lifeway) and then president of the Southern Baptist Convention. Mount Moriah Baptist Church is a member of the Nelson County Baptist Association, Kentucky Baptist Convention, and Southern Baptist Convention. The earliest records of the church are lost, but it is believed that Mount Moriah Baptist was first constituted as Drennon's Lick Creek Baptist Church.

== Economy ==
In July 2022, Governor Beshear announced a major investment in Kentucky's bourbon industry as Beam Suntory will expand the capacity Jim Beam Brands Co. with a $400 million investment that will create more than 50 full-time jobs at the Booker Noe Distillery in Boston, along with a new facility to produce renewable natural gas standards to power the expansion.

In December 2025, the maker of the popular bourbon brand Jim Beam, Beam Suntory, said it will pause operations at its main distillery in Clermont for an indefinite period beginning in January 2026. Although oprations will continue at the Booker Noe distillery in Boston.

== Demographics ==
Historical population
Census	Pop.	Note	%±
2020	253		—
U.S. Decennial Census

== Notable people ==
Colonel Henry Pierson Crowe, USMC, was born there in 1899.
