= Samuels Field =

Airport in Kentucky, United States of America

- IATA: BRY; ICAO: KBRY; FAA LID: BRY

Summary
- Airport type: Public
- Owner: Bardstown-Nelson County Air Board
- Serves: Bardstown, Kentucky
- Elevation AMSL: 669 ft (204 m)
- Coordinates: 37°48′52″N 085°29′59″W
- Website: www.cityofbardstown.org/dept-airport.html

Map
- Location within Kentucky

Runways
Direction	Length		Surface
Direction	ft	m	Surface
3/21	5,003	1,525	Asphalt

Statistics (2018)
- Aircraft operations (year ending 4/5/2018): 8,977
- Based aircraft: 35
- Source: Federal Aviation Administration

Samuels Field (IATA: BRY, ICAO: KBRY, FAA LID: BRY) is a public use airport located two nautical miles (3.7 km) west of the central business district of Bardstown, a city in Nelson County, Kentucky, United States. This airport is included in the FAA's National Plan of Integrated Airport Systems for 2009–2013, which categorized it as a general aviation facility.

The airport is run by the Bardstown-Nelson County Air Board, which consists six members: half appointed by Bardstown and half by Nelson County.

== Facilities and aircraft ==
Samuels Field covers an area of 110 acres (45 ha) at an elevation of 669 feet (204 m) above mean sea level. It has one runway designated 3/21 with an asphalt surface measuring 5,003 by 75 feet (1,525 x 23 m).

For the 12-month period ending April 5, 2018, the airport had 8,977 aircraft operations, an average of 25 per day: 72% general aviation, 20% military, and 8% air taxi. At that time there were 35 aircraft based at this airport: 32 single-engine, 2 multi-engine, and 1 helicopter.

== See also ==
- List of airports in Kentucky
