= Fredericktown, Kentucky =

Unincorporated community in Kentucky, United States

Fredericktown
- Unincorporated
- Location within the state of Kentucky Fredericktown (the United States)
- Coordinates: 37°45′30″N 85°20′30″W
- Country: United States
- State: Kentucky
- County: Washington
- Time zone: UTC-5 (Eastern (EST))
  - Summer (DST): UTC-4 (EDT)

Fredericktown is an unincorporated in Washington County, Kentucky, United States. It lies just south of U.S. Route 150 and is southeast of Bardstown.

First mentioned in a 1785 survey, the town was established in 1818 as Fredericksburg. By the time the post office opened in 1828, it was known as Fredericktown. The post office closed in 1911.
