= Lincoln Homestead State Park =

State park in Kentucky, United States

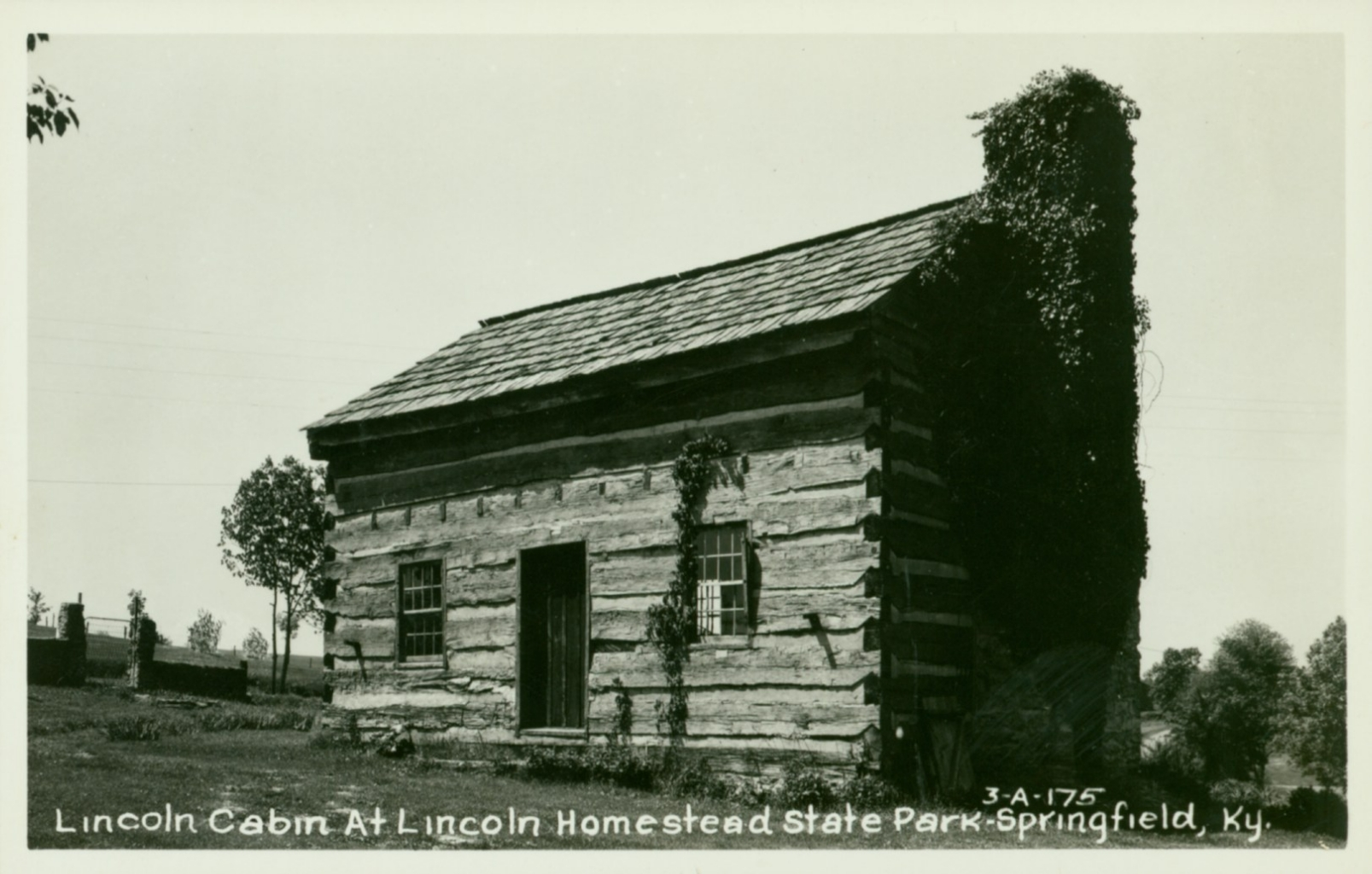
- Vintage postcard of Lincoln Cabin at Lincoln Homestead State Park

- Location within Kentucky Location within the United States
- Type: Kentucky state park
- Location: Springfield, Kentucky, United States
- Coordinates: 37°44′54″N 85°12′35″W
- Area: 120 acres (49 ha)
- Established: June 19, 1936
- Administrator: Kentucky Department of Parks
- Website: Official website

Lincoln Homestead State Park is a state park located just north of Springfield, Kentucky in Washington County. The park encompasses 120 acres (49 ha), and features both historic buildings and reconstructions associated with Thomas Lincoln, father of President Abraham Lincoln.

The two-story Francis Berry House is the only original structure; it was where Nancy Hanks, Abraham's mother, was working as a seamstress and living while being courted by Thomas Lincoln. Thomas is said to have proposed to Nancy by the large fireplace in the cabin.

Two other buildings are reconstructions: the "workshop" where Thomas learned blacksmithing and carpentry, and the "Lincoln cabin." The 16 feet (4.9 m) by 18 feet (5.5 m) structure was built on the site of the original Lincoln cabin where Thomas lived with his family as a boy. It is made of 115-year-old logs. The furnishings were made by Thomas Lincoln as an artisan.

Captain Abraham Lincoln, the president's grandfather, had moved to the site from Virginia in 1781 and 1782 with his wife Bathsheba and their children following the American Revolutionary War. He was killed in May 1786 in an attack by an American Indian. Thomas was saved by his oldest brother Mordecai's shooting the Indian before he could do anything to the boy. Captain Lincoln was buried near the cabin, but the exact location is unknown.

== Activities and amenities ==
The buildings are open between May and September. Visitors may picnic and fish at the lake. There is also a playground for children.

The park includes an 18-hole golf course on the land Mordecai Lincoln once farmed. On the other side of the road from the golf course is the Mordecai Lincoln House, built by Mordecai as an adult. It is a state-recognized historic structure.
