= Washington County, Kentucky =

County in Kentucky, United States

- County
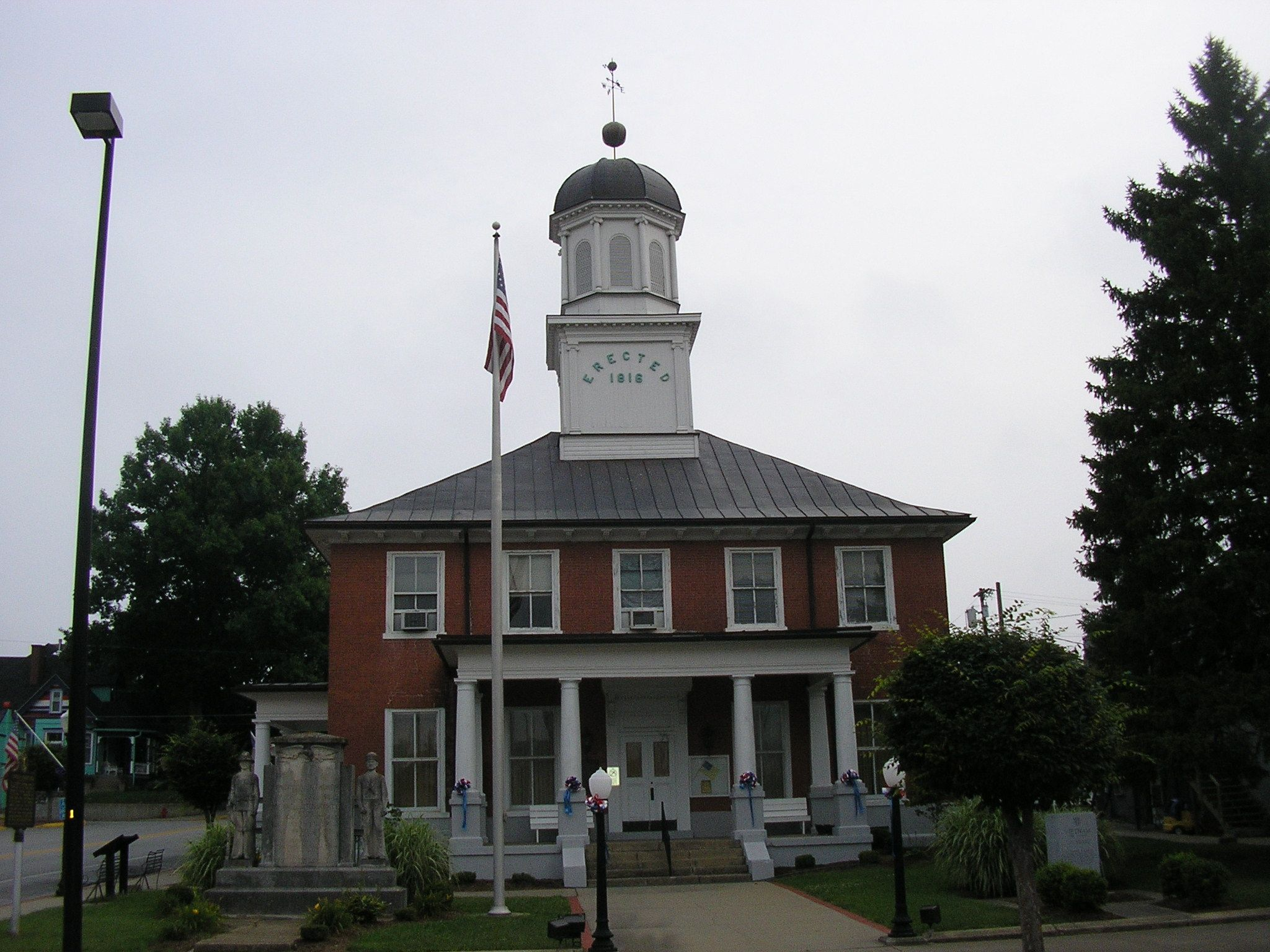
- Washington County courthouse in Springfield

- Location within the U.S. state of Kentucky
- Coordinates: 37°45′N 85°10′W
- Country: United States
- State: Kentucky
- Founded: 1792
- Named for: George Washington
- Seat: Springfield
- Largest city: Springfield

Government
  - Judge/Executive: Timothy Graves (D)

Area
  - Total: 301 sq mi (780 km^{2})
  - Land: 297 sq mi (770 km^{2})
  - Water: 3.9 sq mi (10 km^{2}) 1.3%

Population (2020)
  - Total: 12,027
  - Estimate (2025): 12,368 ▲
  - Density: 40.5/sq mi (15.6/km^{2})
- Time zone: UTC−5 (Eastern)
  - Summer (DST): UTC−4 (EDT)
- Congressional district: 1st
- Website: www.washingtoncountyky.com

Washington County is a county located in the U.S. state of Kentucky. As of the 2020 census, its population was 12,027. Its county seat is Springfield. The county is named for George Washington. Washington County was the first county formed in the Commonwealth of Kentucky when it reached statehood, and the 16th county formed. The center of population of Kentucky is located in Washington County, in the city of Willisburg. Before 2025, the county was dry, meaning that the sale of alcohol was prohibited, but it contained the "wet" city of Springfield, where retail alcohol sales are allowed. This classified the jurisdiction as a moist county. The county become wet in November, 2024 after a ballot initiative. Three wineries operate in the county and are licensed separately to sell to the public. Jacob Beam, founder of Jim Beam whiskey, sold his first barrel of whiskey in Washington County.

== History ==
Washington County was established in 1792 from land taken from Nelson County. It was the first county created by the Commonwealth of Kentucky after its separation from Virginia.

The Washington County Courthouse, completed in 1816, is the oldest courthouse still in use in Kentucky. A significant county court record is the marriage bond of Thomas Lincoln and Nancy Hanks, parents of President Abraham Lincoln. The bond is dated June 10, 1806; it was written the day before the marriage in the small community of Beechland, on the Little Beech River. The marriage return was signed by Jesse Head, the Methodist preacher who performed the ceremony, and dates the marriage to June 12, 1806.

== Geography ==
According to the U.S. Census Bureau, the county has a total area of 301 square miles (780 km^{2}), of which 3.9 sq mi (10 km^{2}) (1.3%) are covered by water.

=== Adjacent counties ===
- Anderson County - northeast
- Mercer County - east
- Boyle County - east
- Marion County - south
- Nelson County - west

== Demographics ==
Historical population
| Census | Pop. | Note | %± |
|---|---|---|---|
| 1800 | 9,050 | | — |
| 1810 | 13,248 | | 46.4% |
| 1820 | 15,947 | | 20.4% |
| 1830 | 19,017 | | 19.3% |
| 1840 | 10,596 | | −44.3% |
| 1850 | 12,194 | | 15.1% |
| 1860 | 11,575 | | −5.1% |
| 1870 | 12,464 | | 7.7% |
| 1880 | 14,419 | | 15.7% |
| 1890 | 13,622 | | −5.5% |
| 1900 | 14,182 | | 4.1% |
| 1910 | 13,940 | | −1.7% |
| 1920 | 14,773 | | 6.0% |
| 1930 | 12,623 | | −14.6% |
| 1940 | 12,965 | | 2.7% |
| 1950 | 12,777 | | −1.5% |
| 1960 | 11,168 | | −12.6% |
| 1970 | 10,728 | | −3.9% |
| 1980 | 10,764 | | 0.3% |
| 1990 | 10,441 | | −3.0% |
| 2000 | 10,916 | | 4.5% |
| 2010 | 11,717 | | 7.3% |
| 2020 | 12,027 | | 2.6% |
| 2025 (est.) | 12,368 | ▲ | 2.8% |
U.S. Decennial Census; 1790–1960 1900–1990; 1990–2000 2010–2021

=== 2020 census ===
As of the 2020 census, the county had a population of 12,027. The median age was 42.5 years. 23.0% of residents were under the age of 18 and 19.1% of residents were 65 years of age or older. For every 100 females there were 96.3 males, and for every 100 females age 18 and over there were 93.8 males age 18 and over.

The racial makeup of the county was 87.6% White, 5.5% Black or African American, 0.2% American Indian and Alaska Native, 0.3% Asian, 0.0% Native Hawaiian and Pacific Islander, 2.3% from some other race, and 4.0% from two or more races. Hispanic or Latino residents of any race comprised 3.9% of the population.

0.0% of residents lived in urban areas, while 100.0% lived in rural areas.

There were 4,674 households in the county, of which 31.0% had children under the age of 18 living with them and 23.9% had a female householder with no spouse or partner present. About 26.4% of all households were made up of individuals and 12.0% had someone living alone who was 65 years of age or older.

There were 5,196 housing units, of which 10.0% were vacant. Among occupied housing units, 77.3% were owner-occupied and 22.7% were renter-occupied. The homeowner vacancy rate was 1.7% and the rental vacancy rate was 6.3%.

=== 2000 census ===
As of the 2000 census, 10,916 people, 4,121 households, and 3,020 families resided in the county. The population density was 36 per square mile (14/km^{2}). The 4,542 housing units had an average density of 15 per square mile (5.8/km^{2}). The racial makeup of the county was 90.62% White, 7.51% African American, 0.16% Native American, 0.28% Asian, 0.61% from other races, and 0.82% from two or more races. About 1.60% of the population were Hispanics or Latinos of any race.

Of the 4,121 households, 33.1% had children under 18 living with them, 59.5% were married couples living together, 10.0% had a female householder with no husband present, and 26.7% were not families. About 24.0% of all households were made up of individuals, and 11.4% had someone living alone who was 65 or older. The average household size was 2.57 and the average family size was 3.03.

The age distribution was 25.3% under 18, 8.8% from 18 to 24, 27.9% from 25 to 44, 23.1% from 45 to 64, and 15.0% who were 65 or older. The median age was 37 years. For every 100 females, there were 96.6 males. For every 100 females 18 and over, there were 91.9 males.

The median income for a household in the county was $33,136, and for a family was $39,240. Males had a median income of $27,624 versus $21,593 for females. The per capita income for the county was $15,722. About 10.3% of families and 13.5% of the population were below the poverty line, including 14.4% of those under 18 and 19.6% of those 65 or over.

== Education ==
The county is served by Washington County Schools, a district that contains five schools:

- North Washington Elementary School in Willisburg for prekindergarten through grade 8 with 468 students
- Washington County Elementary School in Springfield for prekindergarten through grade 5 with 387 students
- Care Academy, Inc. in Willisburg for grades 6–12 with 65 students
- Washington County Middle School in Springfield for grades 6–8 with 206 students
- Washington County High School in Springfield for grades 9–12 with 626 students

St. Catharine College (now closed) was located near Springfield.

== Communities ==
=== Cities ===
- Mackville
- Springfield (county seat)
- Willisburg

=== Unincorporated communities ===
- Bear Wallow
- Brush Grove
- Fredericktown
- Manton
- Maud
- Mooresville
- Pleasant Grove
- Saint Catharine
- Thompsonville

== Politics ==
United States presidential election results for Washington County, Kentucky
| Year | Republican | | Democratic | | Third party(ies) | |
| Year | No. | % | No. | % | No. | % |
|---|---|---|---|---|---|---|
| 1880 | 1,172 | 46.34% | 1,319 | 52.16% | 38 | 1.50% |
| 1884 | 1,133 | 49.61% | 1,144 | 50.09% | 7 | 0.31% |
| 1888 | 1,365 | 50.37% | 1,328 | 49.00% | 17 | 0.63% |
| 1892 | 1,035 | 41.55% | 1,193 | 47.89% | 263 | 10.56% |
| 1896 | 1,573 | 49.51% | 1,536 | 48.35% | 68 | 2.14% |
| 1900 | 1,600 | 48.50% | 1,669 | 50.59% | 30 | 0.91% |
| 1904 | 1,448 | 48.77% | 1,482 | 49.92% | 39 | 1.31% |
| 1908 | 1,515 | 48.06% | 1,615 | 51.24% | 22 | 0.70% |
| 1912 | 1,170 | 41.47% | 1,329 | 47.11% | 322 | 11.41% |
| 1916 | 1,654 | 49.77% | 1,654 | 49.77% | 15 | 0.45% |
| 1920 | 2,892 | 52.56% | 2,600 | 47.26% | 10 | 0.18% |
| 1924 | 2,286 | 50.39% | 2,238 | 49.33% | 13 | 0.29% |
| 1928 | 2,933 | 56.36% | 2,266 | 43.54% | 5 | 0.10% |
| 1932 | 2,340 | 44.97% | 2,841 | 54.60% | 22 | 0.42% |
| 1936 | 2,391 | 48.37% | 2,516 | 50.90% | 36 | 0.73% |
| 1940 | 2,362 | 47.47% | 2,612 | 52.49% | 2 | 0.04% |
| 1944 | 2,353 | 50.56% | 2,283 | 49.05% | 18 | 0.39% |
| 1948 | 1,813 | 45.44% | 2,121 | 53.16% | 56 | 1.40% |
| 1952 | 2,290 | 51.87% | 2,114 | 47.88% | 11 | 0.25% |
| 1956 | 2,536 | 54.69% | 2,084 | 44.94% | 17 | 0.37% |
| 1960 | 2,632 | 52.40% | 2,391 | 47.60% | 0 | 0.00% |
| 1964 | 1,561 | 35.88% | 2,790 | 64.12% | 0 | 0.00% |
| 1968 | 1,863 | 46.35% | 1,675 | 41.68% | 481 | 11.97% |
| 1972 | 2,378 | 58.70% | 1,552 | 38.31% | 121 | 2.99% |
| 1976 | 1,765 | 41.68% | 2,376 | 56.10% | 94 | 2.22% |
| 1980 | 2,008 | 47.26% | 2,147 | 50.53% | 94 | 2.21% |
| 1984 | 2,804 | 60.24% | 1,786 | 38.37% | 65 | 1.40% |
| 1988 | 2,445 | 54.89% | 1,950 | 43.78% | 59 | 1.32% |
| 1992 | 2,098 | 44.69% | 2,008 | 42.77% | 589 | 12.55% |
| 1996 | 2,116 | 50.85% | 1,639 | 39.39% | 406 | 9.76% |
| 2000 | 3,044 | 66.35% | 1,458 | 31.78% | 86 | 1.87% |
| 2004 | 3,479 | 66.44% | 1,724 | 32.93% | 33 | 0.63% |
| 2008 | 3,305 | 62.65% | 1,890 | 35.83% | 80 | 1.52% |
| 2012 | 3,495 | 66.97% | 1,669 | 31.98% | 55 | 1.05% |
| 2016 | 4,013 | 71.20% | 1,420 | 25.20% | 203 | 3.60% |
| 2020 | 4,482 | 72.00% | 1,644 | 26.41% | 99 | 1.59% |
| 2024 | 4,720 | 74.44% | 1,533 | 24.18% | 88 | 1.39% |

=== Elected officials ===
Elected officials as of January 3, 2025
| U.S. House | James Comer (R) | KY 1 |
| Ky. Senate | Jimmy Higdon (R) | 14 |
| Ky. House | Kim King (R) | 55 |

== See also ==
- National Register of Historic Places listings in Washington County, Kentucky
