= National Register of Historic Places listings in Spencer County, Kentucky =

Location of Spencer County in Kentucky

This is a list of the National Register of Historic Places listings in Spencer County, Kentucky.

This is intended to be a complete list of the properties and districts on the National Register of Historic Places in Spencer County, Kentucky, United States. The locations of National Register properties and districts for which the latitude and longitude coordinates are included below, may be seen in a Google map.

There are 14 properties and districts listed on the National Register in the county.

This National Park Service list is complete through NPS recent listings posted December 12, 2025.

== Current listings ==
	Name on the Register	Image	Date listed	Location	City or town	Description
1	All Saints Church	All Saints Church	April 2, 1992 (#92000302)	Eastern side of Main Cross St. between Park Alley and Back Alley; 38°02′00″N 85°20′40″W	Taylorsville	
2	Beechland	Beechland	November 7, 1976 (#76000945)	2.5 miles north of Taylorsville; 38°03′39″N 85°20′23″W	Taylorsville	
3	Bourne-Anderson House	Bourne-Anderson House	December 2, 1977 (#77000648)	0.5 miles north of Taylorsville on Kentucky Route 55; 38°02′15″N 85°21′04″W	Taylorsville	
4	Camp Branch Historic District		February 1, 1994 (#93001594)	Southwestern side of Kentucky Route 55, 0.2. miles northwest of County Road 1392; 37°59′00″N 85°19′27″W	Taylorsville	
5	Isaac Miller Farm		February 1, 1994 (#93001596)	Northern side of Kentucky Route 48, 0.9 west of Fairfield; 37°56′57″N 85°24′05″W	Fairfield	
6	Minor Chapel A.M.E. Church	Minor Chapel A.M.E. Church	April 2, 1992 (#92000300)	Eastern side of Jefferson St. between Red Row Alley and Reasor St. 38°01′59″N 85°20′34″W	Taylorsville	
7	Riverview School	Riverview School	February 1, 1994 (#93001595)	Northeastern side of U.S. Route 31E, 1.2 miles north of High Grove; 37°59′57″N 85°29′18″W	High Grove	
8	L.W. Ross House	L.W. Ross House	April 2, 1992 (#92000299)	Northern side of Kentucky Route 44 east of Taylorsville; 38°01′58″N 85°20′17″W	Taylorsville	
9	Perry Shelburne House	Perry Shelburne House	April 2, 1992 (#92000297)	Western side of Railroad St., north of Red Row Alley; 38°01′58″N 85°20′31″W	Taylorsville	No longer extant.
10	Shelburne-Cox House	Shelburne-Cox House	April 2, 1992 (#92000298)	501 Main St. 38°01′55″N 85°20′34″W	Taylorsville	
11	Felix Grundy Stidger House	Felix Grundy Stidger House	February 12, 2016 (#16000014)	102 Garrard St. 38°01′47″N 85°20′57″W	Taylorsville	
12	Stone House on Plum Creek		January 8, 1987 (#87000213)	Intersection of Kentucky Routes 1060 and 1319; 38°06′07″N 85°26′11″W	Whitfield	
13	Taylorsville Historic District	Taylorsville Historic District	April 2, 1992 (#92000296)	Roughly the 200 and 300 blocks of Main and Garrand Sts. 38°01′50″N 85°20′46″W	Taylorsville	
14	Van Dyke House		January 8, 1987 (#87000181)	Buck Henry Foster Ln. 38°06′11″N 85°18′02″W	Rivals	

== See also ==
- List of National Historic Landmarks in Kentucky
- National Register of Historic Places listings in Kentucky
- List of attractions and events in the Louisville metropolitan area
