= Arthur T. McCormack =

American physician

Arthur Thomas McCormack
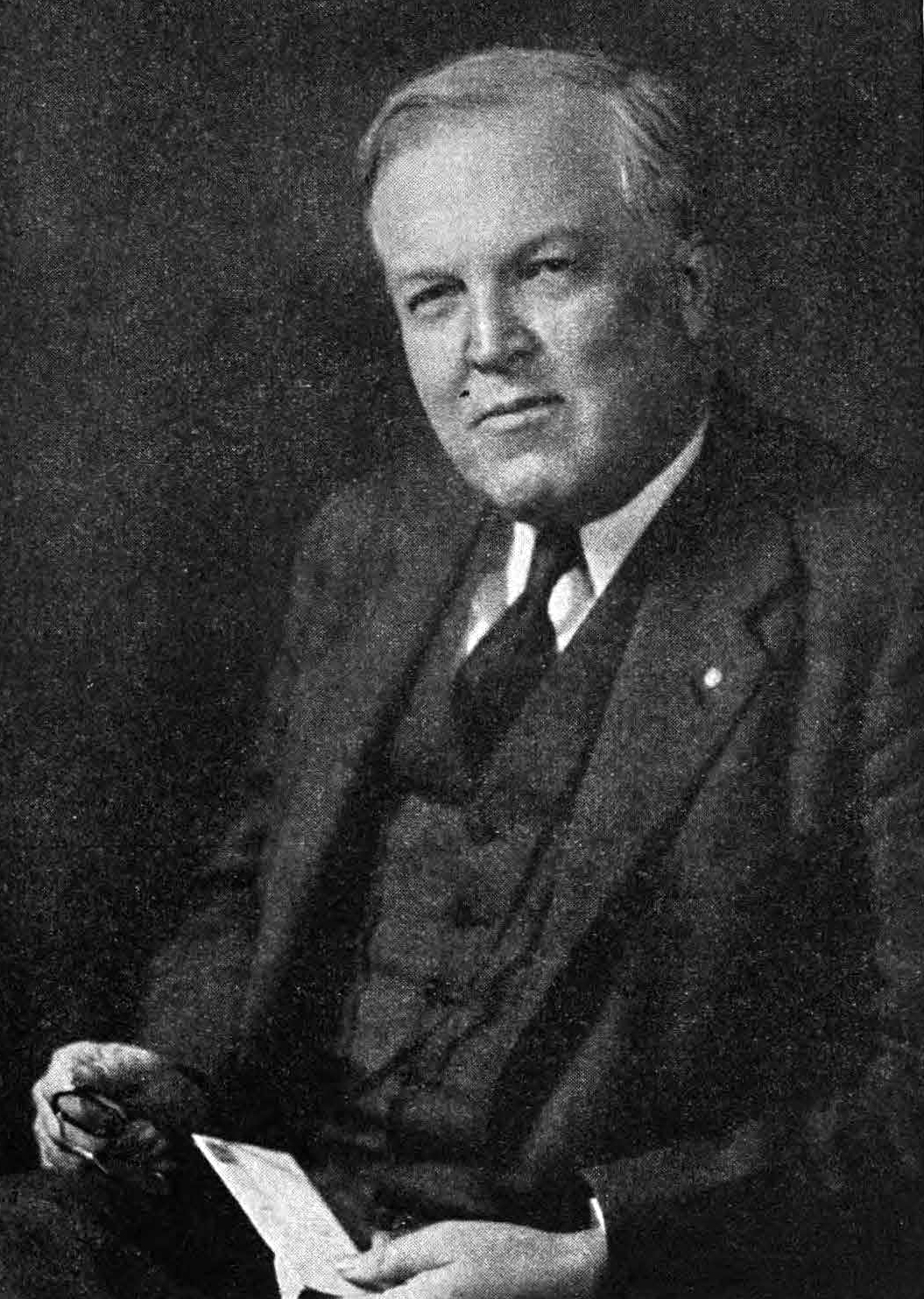
- Photo of McCormack from the Bulletin of Public Health (April 1939)
- Born: August 21, 1872; Nelson County, Kentucky
- Died: August 7, 1943 (aged 70); Louisville, Kentucky
- Occupations: Surgeon and public health official
- Years active: 1897-1943
- Known for: Executive officer of the Kentucky Department of Health 1913-1943; Secretary of Kentucky Medical Association, 1907-1943; Editor of the Kentucky Medical Journal 1906-1943
- Relatives: Joseph N. McCormack

Arthur Thomas McCormack (August 21, 1872 – August 7, 1943) was an American physician best known for serving as the chief public health officer of the Kentucky Department of Health from 1913 to 1943. He was also secretary of the Kentucky Medical Association and editor of the Journal of the Kentucky Medical Association for more than thirty years. He served as president of the American Public Health Association in 1938, the Southern Medical Association in 1940 and the Association of State and Territorial Health Officials (ASTHO) in 1923. Every year since 1950, the ASTHO has presented the Arthur McCormack award to a distinguished North American public health official.

== Family ==
Arthur McCormack was the only child of Joseph N. McCormack and Corinne Crenshaw McCormack. Born on a farm in Nelson County, Kentucky, he moved with his parents to Bowling Green, Kentucky in 1876. In December 1897, McCormack married Mary Moore Tyler of Christian County, Kentucky. Together, they had four children, three of whom died in childhood. After the couple divorced in 1924, McCormack married Jane Teare Dahlman, former director of the Bureau of Public Health Education with the Kentucky State Board of Health.

== Education and medical practice ==
After attending public schools in Bowling Green, McCormack graduated from Ogden College in 1892. He spent one year at the University of Virginia before enrolling in the College of Physicians and Surgeons (now Columbia University College of Physicians and Surgeons). He graduated in 1896 with a degree in medicine and after serving a residency at Paterson Hospital in New Jersey, he returned home to Bowling Green in 1897. He then joined his father's medical practice. The two men later invited Lillian H. South to join the practice and from 1908 to 1912 the three physicians operated St Joseph's hospital, the first hospital in Warren County, Kentucky. McCormack ended his practice of medicine in 1912 as his other professional duties increased in responsibility.

== Kentucky State Board of Health ==
Joseph McCormack, as secretary of the Kentucky State Board of Health (KSBH) in 1897, appointed his son Arthur as health officer of Warren County, Kentucky as well as chief sanitary inspector for the KSBH. In 1911 the KSBH changed Arthur's title to assistant secretary, which allowed him to be appointed simultaneously as director of the Kentucky program of the Rockefeller Commission for the Eradication of Hookworm Disease. In November 1913, Arthur was elected secretary of the Kentucky State Board of Health upon the resignation of his father, Joseph McCormack.

Arthur McCormack oversaw the early 20th century expansion of the Kentucky State Board of Health into what is today the Kentucky Department for Public Health. In 1914, when the United States Public Health Service began a nationwide program for rural sanitation, McCormack assisted in the development of Kentucky's first full-time county health department in Mason County, Kentucky. McCormack took a brief hiatus from his duties at KSBH when he served in Panama during World War I. Upon his return to Kentucky in 1919, he lobbied for the enactment of the 1920 legislation in the Kentucky General Assembly which provided appropriations for additional full-time county health departments. The Morris-Reynolds Physical Education Law mandated that all public schools in Kentucky would provide physical education for students and that the Superintendent of Public Instruction, in cooperation with the KSBH, would prepare an instruction manual. Other important legislation during the decade authorized the KSBH to create the Bureau of County Health Work, the Bureau of Trachoma and Prevention of Blindness, the Bureau of Public Health Education, the Bureau of Dental Health and the Bureau of Medical Registration. The Bureau of Maternal and Child Health, organized in 1922, authorized the KSBH to accept federal funding under the Sheppard–Towner Act. Another of McCormack's special KSBH projects was the joint sponsorship with the University of Louisville (UL) for the UL School of Public Health in 1920. Arthur McCormack served as dean of the school which was absorbed into the UL School of Medicine in 1922. Recognizing the sparsity of physicians in eastern Kentucky, McCormack encouraged Mary Carson Breckinridge in the establishment of the Frontier Nursing Serviceby issuing her a special state license to practice midwifery and promising her "carte blanche" to carry out her plan. In 1934, the Reorganization Act of the Kentucky General Assembly created a State Department of Health to take over the administrative functions of the KSBH, but left the legislative functions intact with the State Board. Arthur McCormack was designated the Commissioner of Public Health, the title he held until his death in 1943.

== Kentucky Medical Association ==
McCormack was elected editor of the Kentucky Medical Journal (now the Journal of the Kentucky Medical Association) with the December 1906 issue. In 1907, he was elected secretary of the Kentucky State Medical Association, (now the Kentucky Medical Association) (KMA). He held both of these positions until his death in 1943, serving the KMA for almost 37 years. He was elected by KMA members to be a delegate to the American Medical Association House of Delegates thirty times between 1908 and 1943. Recognizing that the effectiveness of public health measures depended upon the full cooperation of the medical profession, McCormack used the Kentucky Medical Journal to keep KMA members informed of advances in public health and pending legislation on topics of interest to the profession. Arthur McCormack considered the state board of health, with its authority to issue and revoke medical licenses, to be the "legalized executive department" of the KMA. He continued his father's practice of encouraging the affiliated county medical societies to support the county boards of health and to elect KMA members to the county boards of health. It was this fusion of organized medicine and public health that gave the KMA physicians control of health policy, medical licensure and health legislation in Kentucky for many decades.

== National activities ==
McCormack was a member of many health related associations and served as president of several of them. He was elected president of the American Public Health Association for 1938, of the Southern Medical Association in 1940 and of the Association of State and Territorial Health Officials (ASTHO) in 1923.

== Final years ==
McCormack died of a heart attack on August 7, 1943, at his home in Louisville, Kentucky. His ashes are interred at Fairview Cemetery in Bowling Green, Kentucky. The McCormack Family Papers are housed at the University of Louisville.
