= Joseph N. McCormack =

American politician

Joseph Nathaniel McCormack
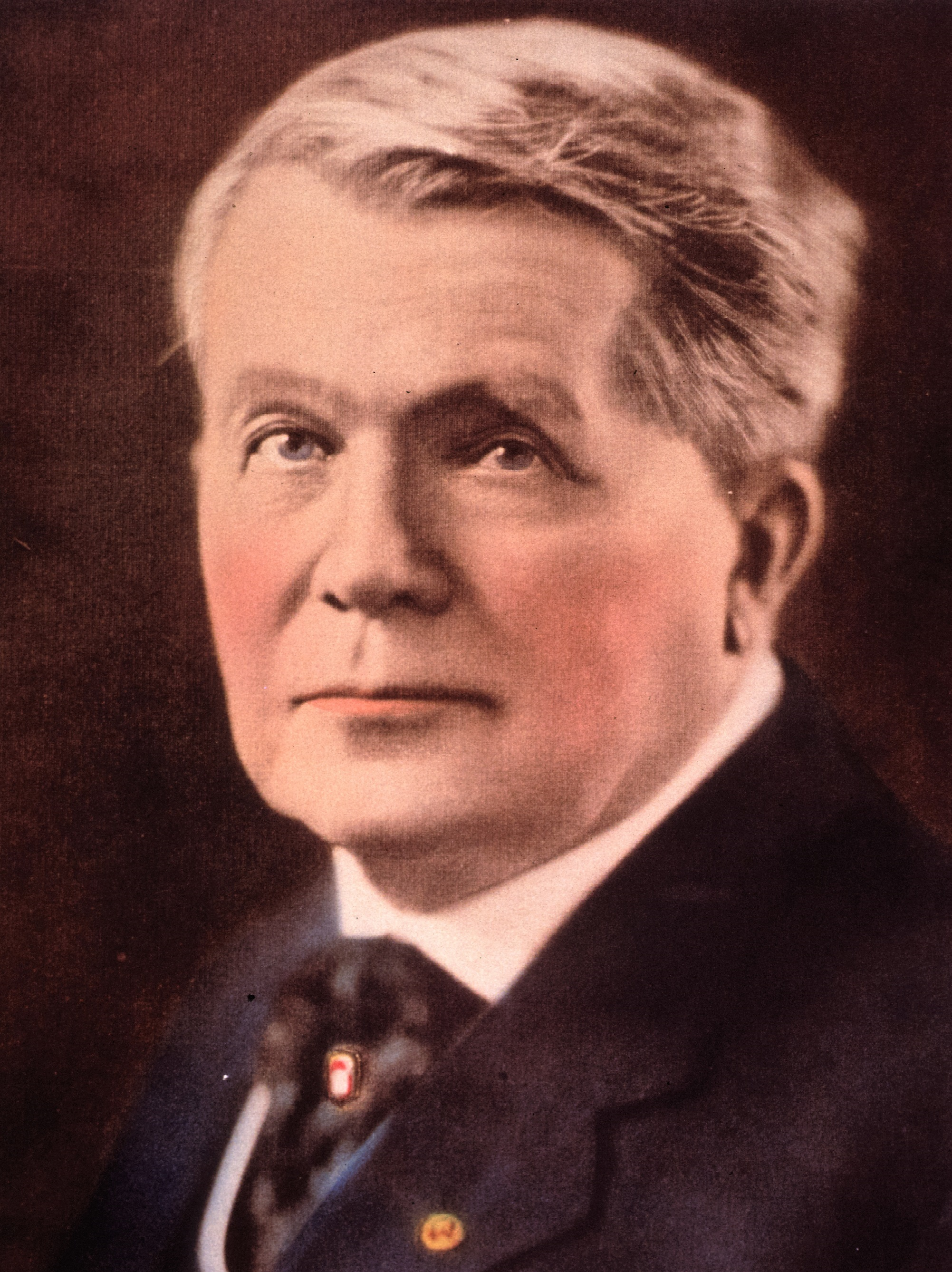
- Born: November 9, 1847; Nelson County, Kentucky
- Died: May 4, 1922 (aged 74); Louisville, Kentucky
- Occupations: Surgeon and public health official
- Years active: 1870-1922
- Known for: Executive officer of the Kentucky State Board of Health and official organizer of the American Medical Association
- Relatives: Arthur T McCormack

Joseph Nathaniel McCormack (November 9, 1847 – May 4, 1922) was an American surgeon, a leader in several national medical organizations and a member of the Kentucky General Assembly. He served as executive officer of the Kentucky State Board of Health for thirty years and he led the reorganization of the American Medical Association (AMA) during its formative years of 1900 to 1911. James Burrow, historian of the AMA, has written that McCormack was "the most influential political leader of the profession in the Progressive Era, or perhaps in the AMA's entire history." McCormack served for six years as president of the Association of State and Territorial Health Officials and for two years as president of the Federation of State Medical Boards. In 1907 the American Association for the Advancement of Science included him in its list of the 100 most influential leaders in the fields of medicine, public health, science and social reform.

== Early life and family ==
Born on a farm in Nelson County, Kentucky, McCormack was the second of eleven children of Thomas McCormack, an Irish immigrant, and Sarah Elizabeth (Brown) McCormack of LaRue County, Kentucky. On March 9, 1871 McCormack married Amanda Corrine Crenshaw of Glasgow, Kentucky. They had one child, Arthur T McCormack (August 21, 1872 – August 7, 1943), who carried on his father's work by serving as Kentucky's commissioner of health from 1913 to 1943.

== Education ==
Because of the scarcity of schools in rural Kentucky in the 19th century, McCormack's early education was short but supplemented by his well-informed and widely traveled father. He received an M.D. from Miami Medical College (now the University of Cincinnati College of Medicine) in 1870 and completed a residency at Cincinnati Commercial Hospital (now the University of Cincinnati Medical Center) the following year. The Medical Department of the University of Louisville (now the University of Louisville School of Medicine) granted him an ad eundem degree in 1873. In 1882 McCormack, like many young doctors of the era, traveled to New York, London, Edinburgh and Vienna to further his medical education.

== Career ==
=== Medical practice ===
Upon completing his medical education McCormack returned to his family home near New Haven, Kentucky and practiced medicine as a country doctor, quickly gaining a reputation as one of the most intrepid surgeons in the state. In 1874 he performed the second cesarean section in Kentucky, the first having been performed in 1852. McCormack moved his young family to Bowling Green, Kentucky in 1876 where he remained until he (and the Kentucky State Board of Health) moved to Louisville, Kentucky in 1919. As one of Kentucky's most respected physicians, McCormack was placed in charge of the team doctors attending William Goebel after the assassination attempt on the governor in 1900. McCormack left his practice of medicine in 1901 to concentrate on the activities of the Kentucky State Board of Health, his work with national organizations and his real estate ventures.

=== Kentucky State Board of Health ===
In 1880 Governor Luke P. Blackburn appointed McCormack to the Kentucky State Board of Health (KSBH), which had been established in 1878. In 1883 McCormack was elected as the fourth executive secretary in the history of the board. He remained in this position until November 1913 when his son, Arthur, succeeded him. Joseph's early years on the board were spent trying to prevent outbreaks of yellow fever, cholera, typhoid fever, smallpox and other contagious diseases.

A severe outbreak of smallpox in Middlesboro, Kentucky in 1898 brought national infamy to the state when, as reported in The New York Times, 69 citizens quarantined in the pesthouse were left without food for almost a week. Those who refused to be vaccinated were being handcuffed and vaccinated at gunpoint. A series of misunderstandings and accusations between city, county, state and federal officials tested the constitutional principles of American federalism as US Surgeon General Walter Wyman was put in a position of exercising of police power in a local community. Although McCormack found the incident in Middlesboro to be "unwarranted interference," he would later work closely and successfully with Wyman, Rupert Blue and other Surgeon Generals of the United States Public Health Service (USPHS). In 1912, for example, he requested that the USPHS conduct a survey of trachoma in eastern Kentucky, resulting in the establishment of trachoma clinics that treated thousands of cases of this contagious eye disease.

With very limited state or local funding for the board, McCormack was forced to rely on the passage of legislation to accomplish his goals. During every session of the Kentucky General Assembly he lobbied for larger appropriations, increased authority, the establishment of city and county boards of health and stricter medical licensing laws. In the process, he drafted all the public health legislation in the State as well as a medical practice act which gave KSBH the authority to examine and license physicians, chiropractors and osteopaths. In 1910 McCormack oversaw the modernization of the State Board of Health to include Bureaus of Vital Statistics, Sanitation, and Bacteriology. He appointed Dr. Lillian H. South, his son's medical partner, as Kentucky's first full-time state bacteriologist.

McCormack was responsible for soliciting tens of thousands of dollars from the Rockefeller Commission for the Eradication of Hookworm Disease in Kentucky. The Commission provided funds for staff, public health education, field dispensaries and remodeling of the bacteriology laboratory for diagnosis and treatment of hookworm infection. Later, when the Commission was incorporated into the International Health Board (IHB), it provided money for the establishment of the first full-time county health departments in Kentucky. One of McCormack's claims to fame is his design for the inexpensive Kentucky Sanitary Privy (KSP), an important improvement on the primitive outhouses used in most rural communities during the era. It was adopted for worldwide use in rural areas by the USPHS and the IHB.

Much of McCormack's success in expanding public health efforts came from his ability to create strong alliances. The coalitions he fostered furthered the causes of municipal sanitation, child welfare, pure food and drug legislation and disease prevention. They also increased publicity and funding for the board. Many of the leaders he worked with achieved national prominence in their respective fields, putting Kentucky in the forefront of numerous public health arenas. Under McCormack's guidance the Kentucky branch of the General Federation of Women's Clubs sponsored Caroline Bartlett Crane to conduct a ten-city sanitary survey in Kentucky which resulted in an increased appropriation for the KSBH. As a state representative in 1914 McCormack arranged for Cora Wilson Stewart to speak before both houses of the Kentucky General Assembly about her Kentucky Illiteracy Commission. After the bill won passage she included lessons on health, sanitation and nutrition when she wrote the Country Life Reader books for national adult illiteracy programs. McCormack and Robert McDowell Allen, head of the Division of Food Control at the University of Kentucky Agricultural Experiment Station, worked closely together in the decades-long campaign for clean and tuberculin-free milk. Together, they drafted Kentucky's early pure food and drug legislation. Allen is credited, along with Harvey Washington Wiley, with securing the passage of the federal Pure Food and Drug Act of 1906. McCormack and Madeline McDowell Breckinridge served together with the Kentucky Association for the Prevention and Treatment of Tuberculosis, an organization that McCormack arranged to have absorbed into the Kentucky State Board of Health in 1918.

During World War I Joseph McCormack was appointed secretary of the Kentucky State Board of Health while his son, Arthur, the secretary of the board, was serving in the military. Joseph McCormack was responsible for passage of the "Big Health Bill" that more than doubled the state's financial appropriation for the KSBH from $30,000 to $75,000. The bill expanded the board from only three bureaus to include bureaus for the prevention of blindness, housing and hotel inspection, prevention of tuberculosis, child health, prevention and treatment of venereal diseases, public health nursing and county health departments. In 1918 and 1919 McCormack oversaw the board's efforts to contain the influenza pandemic, one of the deadliest natural disasters in human history. Influenza infected an estimated 300,000 people in Kentucky and killed approximately 15,000 statewide in a matter of months. During World War I the USPHS coordinated its efforts with the KSBH and the Louisville municipal and Jefferson county health boards to improve health and sanitary conditions in the areas surrounding Camp Zachary Taylor. One of the many improvements made in the five-mile radius of the camp was the installation of a KSP in every home that needed one.

=== Kentucky State Medical Association ===
McCormack rose quickly in the ranks of the Kentucky State Medical Association, later known as the Kentucky Medical Association (KMA). After joining the organization in 1877 he served as corresponding secretary in 1880 and again in 1881. At age 35 he was elected president for 1883-1884. Chairing and serving on many committees, he advocated for establishment of county medical societies, stricter medical licensing laws and higher standards of medical education. The most important contribution that McCormack made during his association with the KMA was the interlocking relationship between the KMA and the KSBH. Recognizing that the effectiveness of public health measures depended upon the full cooperation of the medical profession, he set about reorganizing the KMA and forming affiliated county medical societies that would support the county boards of health. It was this fusion of organized medicine and public health that gave the KMA physicians control of health policy, medical licensure and health legislation for many decades.

=== National Conference of State Boards of Health ===
Having served as executive secretary or president of the National Conference of State Boards of Health (now the Association of State and Territorial Health Officials) for its first eight years, McCormack was instrumental in developing the framework for interstate cooperation between state boards of health. Without a national health board it was especially important for public health authorities in each state to maintain close communications. In 1883 McCormack, Stephen Smith, and three other state board secretaries formed the Conference to meet this need. For the first two years McCormack served as executive secretary and from 1886 to 1893 served as president. During his tenure he was responsible for the finalization of the first constitution and bylaws, the development of procedures for interstate notification of contagious and infectious diseases and for the negotiation of interstate rules and regulations for state boards of health throughout the nation. In 1892, when there was a major outbreak of cholera in Europe, there was no federal health department to prevent the importation of the disease into the United States. Under President McCormack's leadership, members of the Conference took it upon themselves to form the International Quarantine Inspection Committee. The committee members visited every major port on the Atlantic Ocean and Gulf of Mexico, inspecting facilities and advising port authorities on procedures for controlling ships, cargo and passengers, and if necessary, establishing quarantines.

=== American Public Health Association ===
The American Public Health Association (APHA) was less than ten years old when McCormack became a member in 1880. He was elected vice president in 1893 and served on many committees including the executive committee for three years. One of his contributions to the APHA was his fifteen years of service on the Committee for National Legislation. During his term on this committee he served as a liaison between the APHA, the National Conference of State Boards of Health, the American Medical Association and the Committee of One Hundred of the American Association for the Advancement of Science, all of which were advocating for the establishment of a national board of health.

=== Committee of One Hundred on National Health ===
In 1907 the American Association for the Advancement of Science established the "Committee of One Hundred on National Health" by appointing McCormack, Irving Fisher, Jane Addams, Andrew Carnegie, Alexander Graham Bell, Booker T Washington, Hermann Biggs and 93 other influential Americans to coordinate and promote efforts to establish a cabinet level national health department. McCormack served for two years on the executive committee of the Committee of One Hundred. He gave hundreds of speeches throughout the US supporting a national board of health; in 1910 he testified at the US Senate Committee on Public Health and National Quarantine on the Proposed Department of Public Health.

=== National Confederation of State Medical Examining and Licensing Boards ===
The National Confederation of State Medical Examining and Licensing Boards (NCSMELB) was a coalition of representatives from states that had established medical examining and licensing boards in the late nineteenth century. Its purpose was twofold. It strove to elevate standards of medical education and to standardize procedures for awarding licenses to practice medicine. By the start of McCormack presidency in 1900 the organization had settled for a minimum standard to be required by state licensing boards: a three-year graded curriculum with each course of lectures required to be not less than six months. McCormack's presidency expanded the scope of the Confederation in two new directions. He appointed the first committee to collaborate with the Association of American Medical Colleges on issues related to the reform of medical education. He also broached the subject of interstate reciprocity but was not able to lead the membership to consensus. In 1902 representatives of four state licensing boards resigned from the NCSMELB to form the American Confederation of Reciprocating Examining and Licensing Boards. The two confederations operated independently until 1912 when they merged into what is now the Federation of State Medical Boards.

=== American Medical Association ===
McCormack was appointed chairman of the 1900 Committee on Reorganization of the American Medical Association (AMA). The committee rewrote the constitution and by-laws, creating the House of Delegates and restructuring the Association into a "confederation of state medical societies" based on "confederations of county organizations." This structure is still in effect today. The committee also prepared a model constitution for state medical societies and for two years McCormack spoke at meetings of state medical societies to persuade them to adopt the model constitution and to structure their state societies as recommended by the AMA. McCormack was successful in this effort and in 1903 the AMA Board of Trustees hired him as its official organizer. For the next eight years he traveled to most of the counties of every state in the U.S.—an estimated 2000 towns and cities. In November 1905, for example, he spent 25 days in Texas giving one or more speeches in each of 21 cities. In 1910-1911 alone he visited 97 cities in 11 states. Speaking to doctors, he emphasized the need for unity in the profession. It would not be until physicians put an end to strife and competition, he said, that they would improve their public image and socioeconomic status. Only then would they be able to influence legislation favorable to public health and the interests of the profession.

Ever mindful of the need for public health education McCormack held meetings for local citizens. He told them of the dangers of patent medicines, of the ways to prevent the spread of communicable diseases, and of the need for legislation in favor of pure food, water and milk. Presenting lectures such as "Things about Doctors which Doctors and Other People Ought to Know," and "The New Gospel of Health and Long Life," McCormack stressed the need for public support of increased fees for family physicians. Only when they were adequately paid, said McCormack, would physicians be able to afford the books, journals and courses needed to keep abreast of the changes in scientific medicine. As McCormack preached, no physician could be competent without continuing his education after graduation from medical school. To this end, he worked with his Bowling Green colleague, John Blackburn, to develop a program of basic sciences and therapies to be used for postgraduate study by local medical societies. By 1909 approximately 350 county medical societies were participating in the program.

In his eleven years as chair of the reorganization committee and organizer of the AMA, McCormack served as a consultant to the AMA board of trustees and eleven presidents including William James Mayo, William C. Gorgas, William H. Welch, William Williams Keen, John Allan Wyeth, John Benjamin Murphy and George Miller Sternberg. In 1911, McCormack was nominated for the presidency of the AMA but lost the election to Abraham Jacobi.

Prior to the reorganization, the AMA had been a "weak, ineffectual, provincial society," but because of McCormack's organizational work, the membership in the AMA rose from 8,000 to more than 70,000 in less than a decade—an estimated half of the physicians in the United States. This gave the AMA "enormous political leverage" and brought it from "political obscurity to public prominence". From this period, asserts historian Paul Starr, "dates the power of what came to be called organized medicine."

== Final years and death ==
McCormack resigned as AMA organizer in December 1911 and as KSBH secretary in November 1913. He represented Warren County, Kentucky during the 1914 session of the House of Representatives in the Kentucky General Assembly. When he lost his bid for re-election to the 1916 session he returned to KSBH as director of the bureau of sanitation, a position he held until his death. In 1917 he published Some Medical Pioneers of Kentucky. When the KSBH and the University of Louisville (UL) co-founded the first UL School of Public Health in 1919, he was appointed honorary dean and lecturer of hygiene. McCormack died of cerebral hemorrhage at his home in Louisville on May 4, 1922. His ashes are interred at Fairview Cemetery in Bowling Green, Warren County, Kentucky. In October 1938, Kentucky Governor Happy Chandler dedicated the J. N. McCormack Memorial Health Building in Louisville. The McCormack family papers are housed at the University of Louisville.

== Publications ==
- M'Cormick [sic], J. N. (1873). "Fracture of the Skull—Meningitis". American Practitioner. 8 (2): 14–18.
- M'Cormick [sic], J. N. (1873). "Hematoma of the Dura Mater". American Practitioner. 8 (15): 224–226.
- McCormack, J. N. (1874). "Fibroid Tumor of the Neck of the Uterus Necessitating Cesarean Section". American Practitioner. 10 (23): 341–343.
- McCormack, J. N. (1879). "Gastronomy for Relief of Internal Strangulation of the Bowel—Extensive Sloughing of the Intestine – Recovery". American Practitioner. 20 (9): 129–133.
- McCormack, J. N. (1880). "A Case of Puerperal Laparotomy for Rupture of the Uterus with Remarks on Uterine Sutures". American Journal of Obstetrics and Diseases of Women and Children. 13 (2): 329–335.
- McCormack, J. N. (1883). "Double Identity After Trepanning". Medical Record. 23 (21): 570.
- M'Cormack, J. N. (1883). "The Powers and Duties of Local Boards of Health". American Practitioner. 27 (17): 268–272.
- McCormack, J. N. (1894). "Obstacles to be Met in Elevating the Standard of the Medical Profession". Transactions of the Kentucky Medical Association. 3: 15–29.
- McCormack, J. N. (1901). "The Kentucky Medical Practice Law". Bulletin of the American Academy of Medicine. 5 (5): 261–265.
- McCormack, J. N. (1901). "The Necessity for Medical Organization". American Practitioner and News. 31 (11): 401–405.
- McCormack, J. N. (1905). "What Remains to be Done in Medical Licensure". State Board Journal of America. 1 (2): 42–45.
- McCormack, J. N. (1904). "A Plea for Unification and Uniform Organization". Buffalo Medical Journal. 59 (6): 474–477.
- McCormack, J. N. (1906). "What the People Should Know about the Doctors and What the Doctors Should Know about Themselves". Alabama Medical Journal. 19 (1): 1–23.
- McCormack, J. N. "What Should be the Relations of Pharmacists and Physicians?" Proceedings of the American Pharmaceutical Association (1907): 242-249
- McCormack, J. N. Some of the Medical Pioneers of Kentucky. Kentucky Medical Association. 1917.
- McCormack, J. N. (1920). "The Fundamental Knowledge Necessary for Health Officers". Southern Medical Journal. 8 (7): 498–501. doi:10.1097/00007611-192007000-00007.
