= Highgrove, Kentucky =

Highgrove
- Unincorporated community
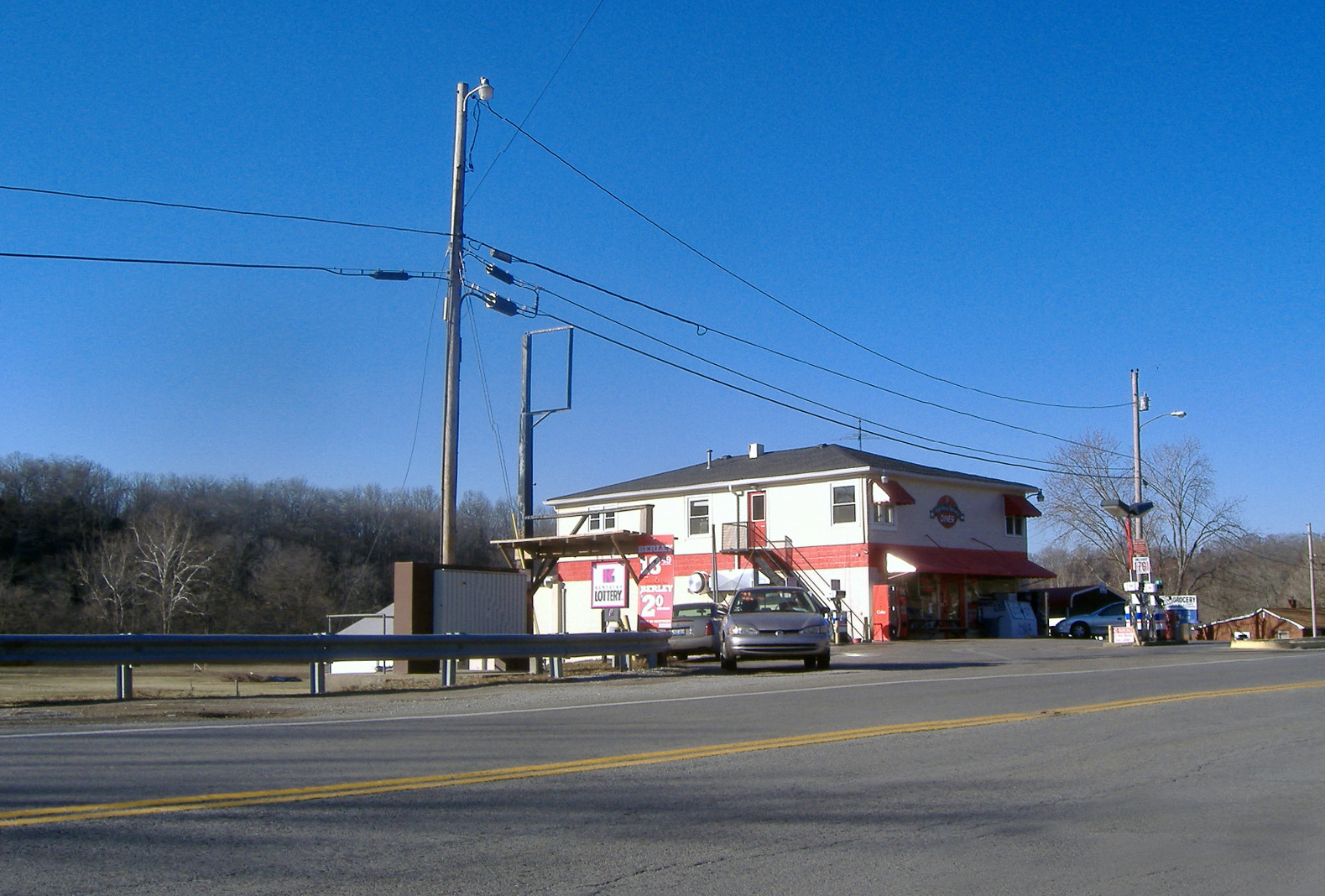
- Highgrove Grocery
- Interactive map of Highgrove
- Country: United States
- State: Kentucky
- County: Nelson
- Elevation: 495 ft (151 m)
- Time zone: UTC-5 (Eastern Time)
  - Summer (DST): UTC-4 (Eastern Daylight Time)

Highgrove is an unincorporated community in extreme northern Nelson County, Kentucky, United States, located about 6 miles southwest of Fairfield and 10 miles southwest of Bloomfield.

== History ==
The town was named for its location on a hill in a grove of trees.

The post office, originally named High Grove, was established in 1828 and ended services in 1906.

== Transportation ==
Highgrove is served by Kentucky Route 48 to the west and KY 523 to the south, which connects Highgrove to Kentucky Route 480, U.S. Route 31E, and U.S. Route 150.
