= Arthur McCormack =

Arthur McCormack may refer to:

- Arthur John McCormack (1866–1936), English businessman and patent holder.
- Arthur T. McCormack (1872–1943), American physician and public health officer

== See also ==
- Arthur MacCormick (1864–1948), New Zealand cricketer
