= Silvester Johnson =

American politician

Member of the Kentucky House of Representatives from Nelson County
- In office August 1, 1859 – August 5, 1861
- Preceded by: John C. Wickliffe
- Succeeded by: Felix G. Murphy

Personal details
- Born: October 15, 1813 Nelson County, Kentucky
- Died: July 13, 1889 (aged 75) New Haven, Kentucky
- Resting place: Saint Catherine Cemetery, New Haven, Kentucky
- Party: Democratic Party
- Spouse: Mildred Boone Johnson
- Education: St. Mary's College
- Occupation: Merchant, Attorney, Banker

Silvester Johnson (October 15, 1813 – July 13, 1889) was a Kentucky merchant and a member of the Kentucky House of Representatives.

== Biography ==
=== Early life and business ventures ===
Johnson was born October 15, 1813, on his parents' farm near New Hope, Kentucky in southern Nelson County. The son of John and Dorothy (Miles) Johnson, he was well educated, receiving a liberal education and was graduated from St. Mary's College in Marion County in 1832. After graduation, he spent the next three years teaching school in both Nelson and Hardin Counties and, in the summer off-season, working the flatboats with his uncle along the Rolling Fork, Ohio, and Mississippi Rivers.

In 1835 he married Mildred Boone and settled in the village of New Haven, where he purchased a prime location at the center of town, on the corner of the Bardstown & Green River Turnpike and the Lebanon Road. His mercantile business was quite lucrative and, by 1840, Silvester had accumulated a small fortune of over $6,000 (equivalent to $144,240.00 in 2016) and owned five slaves. He continued to work the flatboat and merchandising trade on the Rolling Fork River until 1843, when he opened his own store in New Haven.

=== Politics ===
By early 1839, he had become an influential member of society in the New Haven area and was instrumental in pressing for the incorporation of the village as a town. In February 1839, New Haven was incorporated as a city and in April 1840, at the age of 27, Johnson was elected as New Haven's first town chairman.

In 1843, in addition to his business ventures, Johnson was appointed a county deputy sheriff and, in 1853 he was elected Nelson County Sheriff. He only served a single one-year term as sheriff, but was again appointed as a deputy sheriff in 1855, serving until 1857. Johnson was also kept active by several appointments to county committees in both Nelson and LaRue Counties. In April 1854 he was appointed as one of three commissioners responsible for the correction of boundary lines in two of the Bardstown voting districts as well as districts on the south side of the Beech Fork in southern Nelson County. Trained as a lawyer, Johnson not only handled his own legal affairs, but was also those of several guardianships for local underage children.

A "Henry Clay" Whig for much of his early life, Johnson was forced to shift to the Democratic Party when the Whig Party collapsed in the mid-1850s. However, his political beliefs remained close to that of Henry Clay and in August 1859 he was elected to a two-year term as the Representative for Nelson County to the Kentucky House of Representatives.

In addition to his political and business ventures, Johnson continued to invest in property in and around New Haven and by 1860 he had built two large liquor warehouses along Center Street for storage of his wares. By this time, his net worth was over $60,000 (equivalent to $1,602,666.67 in 2016).

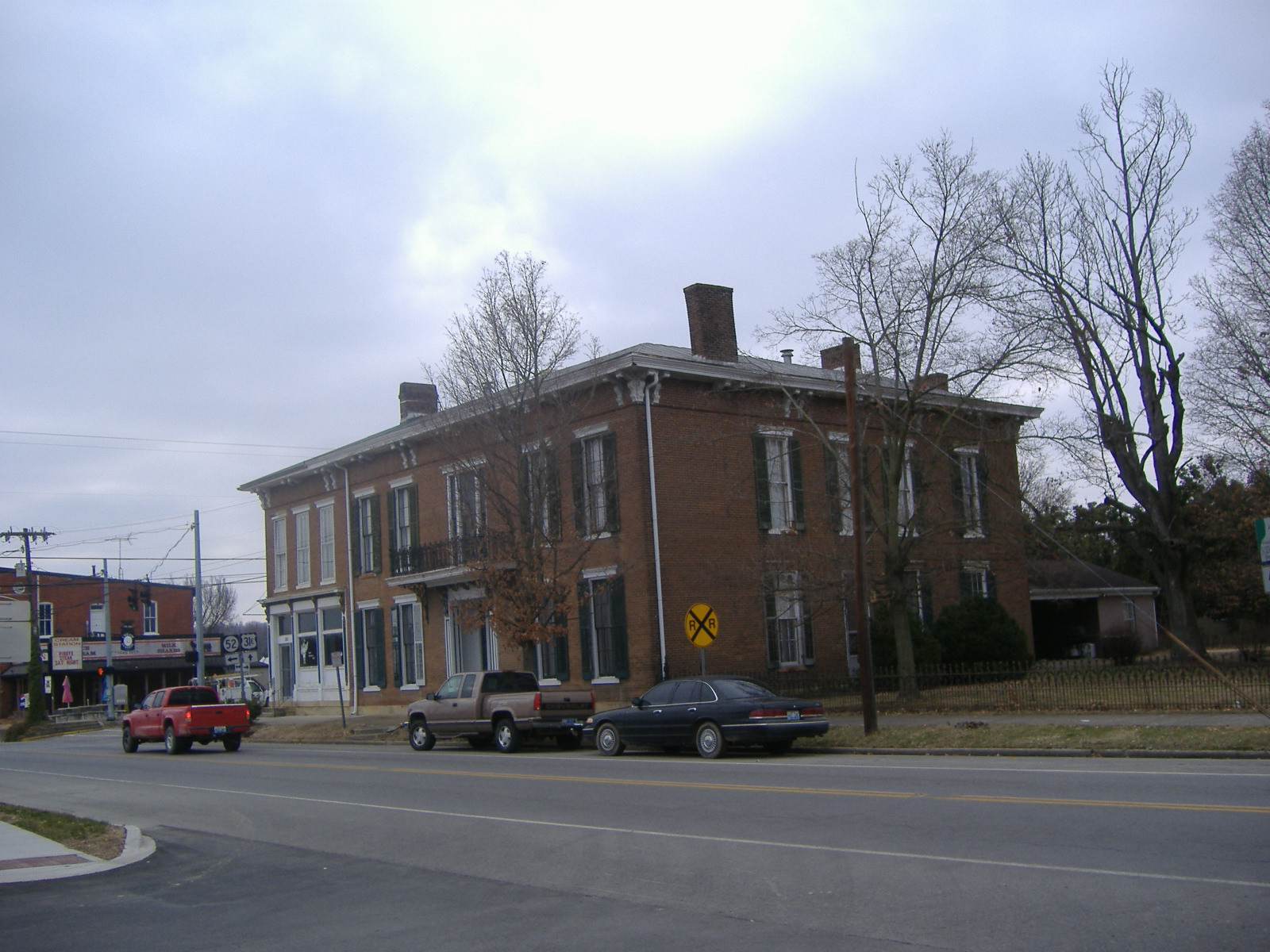
Silvester Johnson's house and business in New Haven, Kentucky

The arrival of the Louisville and Nashville Railroad in 1857 resulted in a drop in the cost of shipping and also freed Johnson's business from dependence upon seasonal riverboat traffic. The resultant savings was significant enough that in 1858 he began construction of a new home and office building, which was completed in 1861. During that same year, Johnson took on a business partner, John D. Boles, and founded Johnson & Boles.

Johnson's election to the House of Representatives came at a turbulent time. The nation was struggling with the issue of slavery in the admission of new states. Kentucky was not immune to the politics of abolition and secession. As a businessman, slave owner, and right-of-center Democrat, Johnson clung to his belief in the Union. One of the actions he undertook in the State House of Representatives was to ask the House to allow Reverend Dr. James Craik, Rector of Christ Church in Louisville, to give a discourse on the history and value of the American Union.

The most important action to occur during Johnson's tenure in the House was the vote on secession and neutrality in 1861. This exposure to the politics in Frankfort so upset him that he never again ran for public office but instead worked as a member of the Nelson County Democratic Committee.

=== Later life ===
The American Civil War hampered growth of his business. Although he continued to operate his warehouses and sales, the threat of Confederate raiders disrupted railroad traffic in the area and made it difficult to ship goods. Johnson was an astute businessman and attempted to remain above the politics of the time. On September 23, 1862, he hosted Colonel Joseph Wheeler and his staff for breakfast during the brief Confederate occupation of New Haven. Although he continued to make money during the war, its end finally resulted in the loss of the 14 slaves who operated his home and business.

Johnson continued to operate his business despite the loss of his slaves in 1866 after the passage of the Thirteenth Amendment. By the mid-1870s, he was dabbling in the banking business, as well as wholesaling liquor. Widowed in 1875, he never remarried. His generosity to the poor and to the Catholic Church earned him a knighthood in the Order of Saint Gregory the Great from Pope Leo XIII in 1886.

When he died in 1889, Johnson was the wealthiest man in Nelson County, leaving an estate of over $500,000 (equivalent to $13,355,555.56 in 2016). His funeral was attended by over 2000 people and was officiated over by William George McCloskey, Bishop of Louisville. He is buried next to his wife in Saint Catherine Cemetery in New Haven.
