= Isaac Miller Farm =

- U.S. National Register of Historic Places
- Location within Kentucky Location within the United States
- Location: Northern side of Kentucky Route 48, 0.9 west of Fairfield, Kentucky
- Coordinates: 37°56′57″N 85°24′05″W
- Area: 238 acres (96 ha)
- Architectural style: Central-passage plan
- MPS: Spencer County MPS
- NRHP reference No.: 93001596
- Added to NRHP: February 1, 1994

The Isaac Miller Farm, near Fairfield, Kentucky, was listed on the National Register of Historic Places in 1994. The 238 acres (96 ha) listing included 10 contributing buildings, a contributing structure, and a contributing site.

It includes a frame, two-story, central-passage plan house and various agricultural outbuildings. It has also been known as O.M. Rogers Farm.
