= Rooster Run =

General store in Nelson County, Kentucky

Coordinates: 37.886358°N 85.549739°W

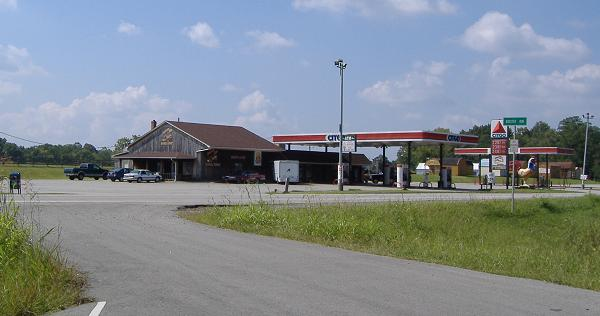
- Rooster Run in 2006
- Formerly: Evans Beverage Depot
- Founded: 1967; 58 years ago

Rooster Run is a general store in Nelson County, Kentucky. Joe Evans opened the store in 1967. It was known for the baseball caps featuring its logo and the fiberglass rooster statue standing in front of the store. It has been called "one of the best-known general stores in the country and one of Kentucky's best-known unincorporated businesses". Though not an official Kentucky community, the location is on state highway maps and receives mail with the zip code of Cox's Creek. Evans used the store's notoriety in unsuccessful bids for political office.

== History ==
Joe Evans opened the store—then called Evans Beverage Depot—in 1967 with $200 of his own money and $200 borrowed from his father. At the time, it was the only location in the county that sold alcoholic beverages. One evening after the store closed, Evans and some friends were gathered at the store, drinking beer when one of the men's wives arrived, sending him running. One of the friends commented, "Look at that rooster run!", giving rise to the store's present name. Shortly after the incident, Evans' mother began sewing baseball caps with the name "Rooster Run" on them for sale in the store. Evans trademarked the name and the store's logo in 1986. A 13.5-foot (4.1 m)-tall fiberglass rooster statue dubbed "Ozzie Frank" was placed in front of the store. Eventually, the store expanded, and its merchandising grew to include t-shirts and other promotional merchandise, but the baseball caps remained the most popular item. At one point, Evans had a standing order for 30,000 caps per quarter. By 1991, he estimated he'd sold about 1.5 million caps.

The store's notoriety began to spread as truck drivers wore the hats to locations across the country. A Louisville-based disc jockey also began telling Rooster Run jokes on the air. The Kentucky Encyclopedia calls it "one of the best-known general stores in the country and one of Kentucky's best-known unincorporated businesses".

== Community ==
According to the Lexington-Herald Leader, "[t]he community [of Rooster Run] was named after and consists of the store." Although there was historically no Kentucky community by the name "Rooster Run", the Kentucky Transportation Cabinet placed the locale on official highway maps of the state. Evans also convinced the Cabinet to erect signs along Kentucky Route 245 directing motorists to Rooster Run. The United States Postal Service delivers mail addressed to Rooster Run as long as it includes the ZIP code of nearby Cox's Creek.

== Joe Evans ==
In the mid-1980s, Evans was elected as a magistrate for Nelson County. In 1991, he made a bid for Kentucky Secretary of State, during which he legally changed his name to Joe Rooster Run Evans, to capitalize on the store's notoriety. During the campaign, he toured the state with the fiberglass rooster "Ozzie Frank" to drum up publicity. He finished last in the three-man Democratic primary. In 1998, Evans sought to represent the 8th District in the Kentucky Senate, but lost to Republican Dan Kelly.

Evans retired in 2004 and died in 2013.

== See also ==
- List of attractions and events in the Louisville metropolitan area
