= Yewell House =

- U.S. National Register of Historic Places
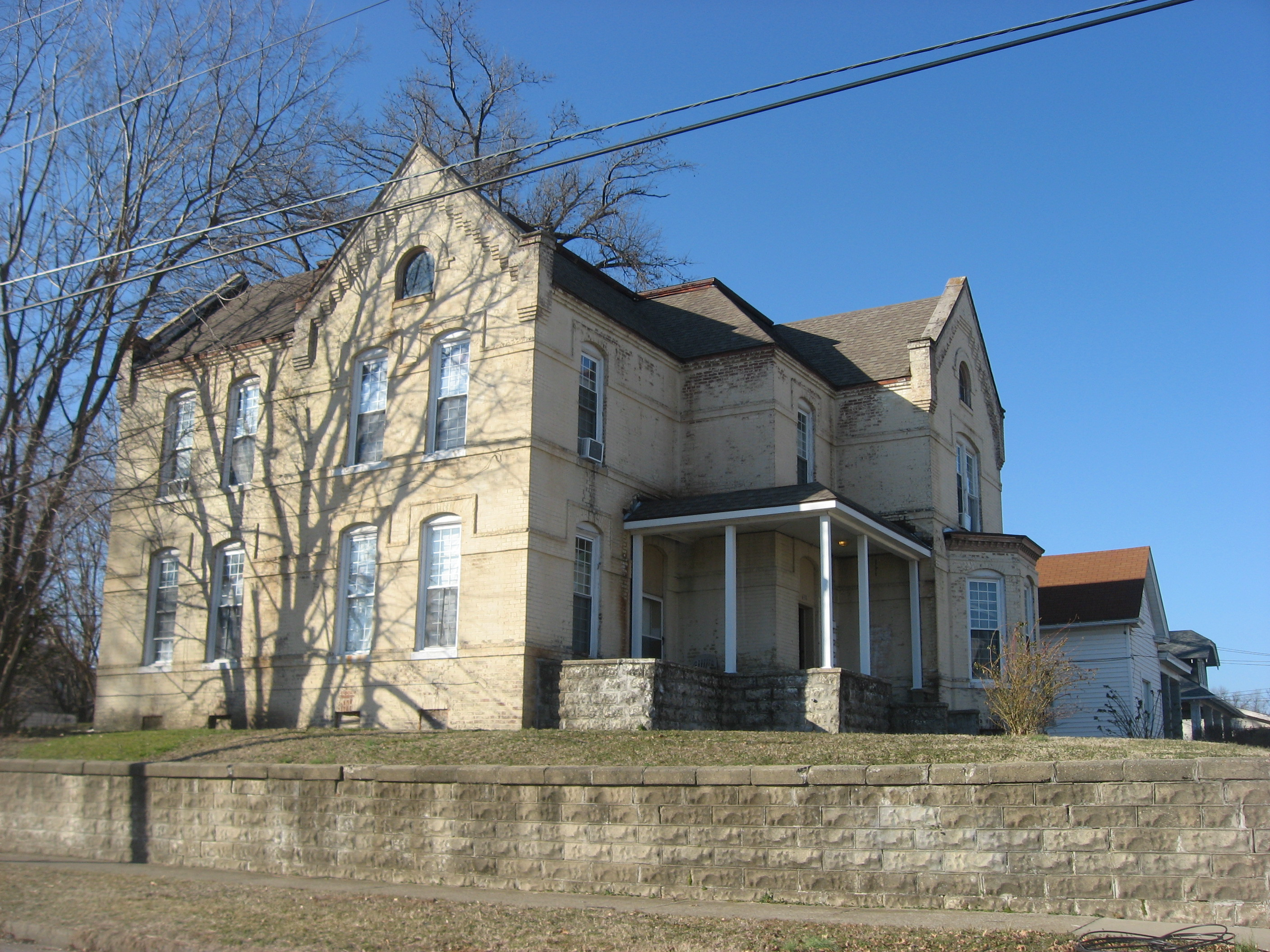

- Location within Kentucky Location within the United States
- Location: 630 Clay St., Owensboro, Kentucky
- Coordinates: 37°46′12″N 87°06′23″W
- Area: 0.2 acres (0.081 ha)
- Built: 1894
- Architectural style: Queen Anne
- MPS: Owensboro MRA
- NRHP reference No.: 86000762
- Added to NRHP: March 28, 1986

The Yewell House, at 630 Clay St. in Owensboro, Kentucky, was built in 1894. It is Queen Anne in style. It was listed on the National Register of Historic Places in 1986.

It was deemed significant in 1986 "as an outstanding example of the Queen Anne style of architecture. It was built in 1894 by wealthy tobacco farmer Franklin Yewell who moved to Daviess County from Nelson County. Yewell constructed this house when he was 70 years old and lived in it only a few more years after its completion. His widow lived there until 1928 and at her death it went to their son Dr. A. S. Yewell, a prominent physician, who lived there another thirty years. It remained in the Yewell family for a total of 72 years and is now owned by an architect who uses it for a multi-family residence."

It is a two-story, brick house with "the unusual feature of front, side and rear gables. A rusticated stone effect is used for the front wall and the foundation of the front porch. The projecting front gable has a one-story bay window with rectangular windows. A bracketed cornice runs along the roofline of the bay and a section of the original metal cresting rises above this. Balancing the bay window is a one-story wood porch with simple columns and spindles. This porch provides access to the main entrance to the residence. This porch is also topped by metal cresting. An interesting wall texture is created by brick corbelling that runs across the front, side and rear of the house creating a double-arched window on the second floor. Brick patterning outlines the peaks of each of the gables. There are also small-arched windows in the peak of each gable. The hipped roof is covered by a standing seam metal roof."
