= Felix Grundy Stidger House =

- U.S. National Register of Historic Places
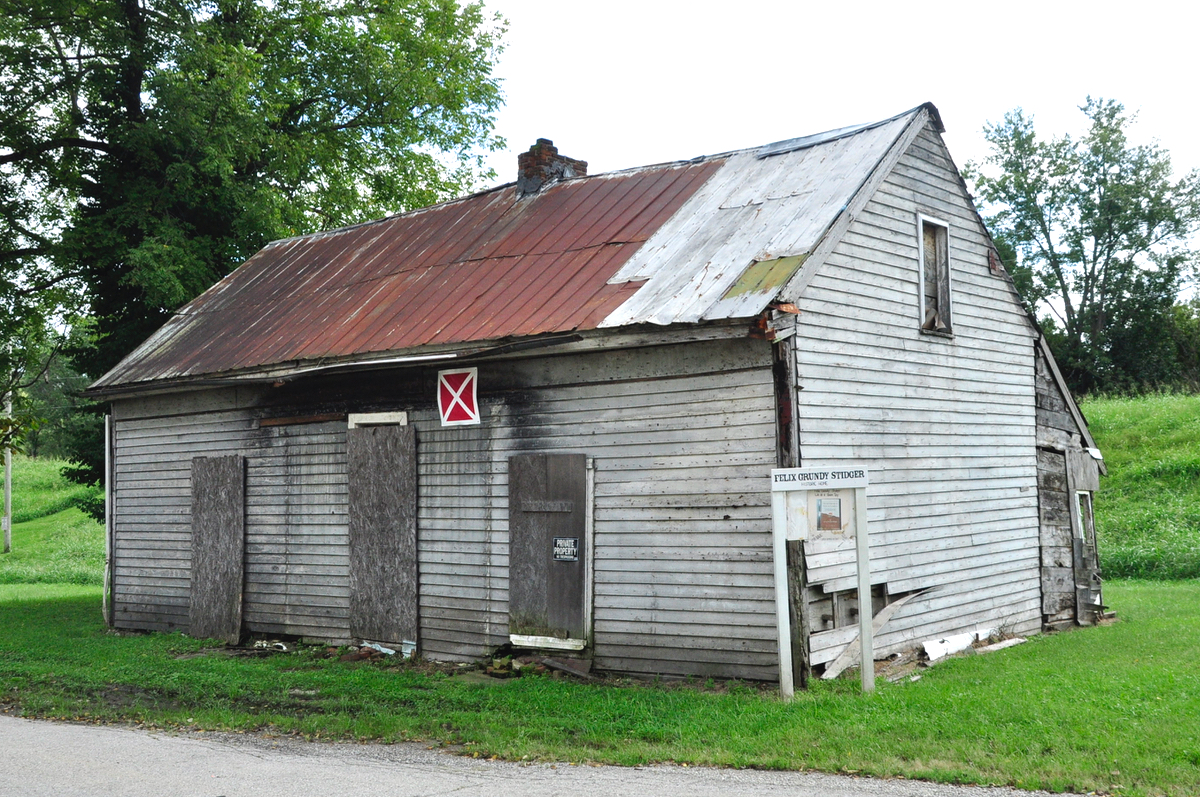
- A north front & west side view of the Felix Grundy Stidger House, September 2018

- Location within Kentucky Location within the United States
- Location: 1102 Garrard Street; Taylorsville, Kentucky; United States
- Coordinates: 38°01′47″N 85°20′57″W
- Area: .4 acres (0.16 ha)
- Architectural style: Saddlebag architecture
- NRHP reference No.: 16000014
- Added to NRHP: February 12, 2016

The Felix Grundy Stidger House is a historic residence in Taylorsville, Kentucky, United States, that is listed on the National Register of Historic Places.

== Description ==
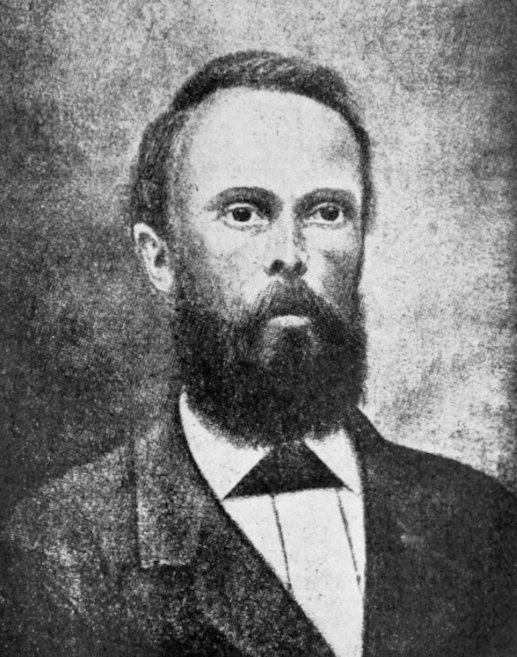
Felix Grundy Stidger

The house is a saddlebag-plan log house. It was in very poor condition in September 2018. It is notable for its association with Felix Grundy Stidger (1836–1908), a Union spy during the American Civil War.

The house was listed on the National Register of Historic Places February 12, 2016.

== See also ==
- National Register of Historic Places listings in Spencer County, Kentucky
