= All Saints Catholic Church (Taylorsville, Kentucky) =

Historic church in Kentucky, United States

- U.S. National Register of Historic Places
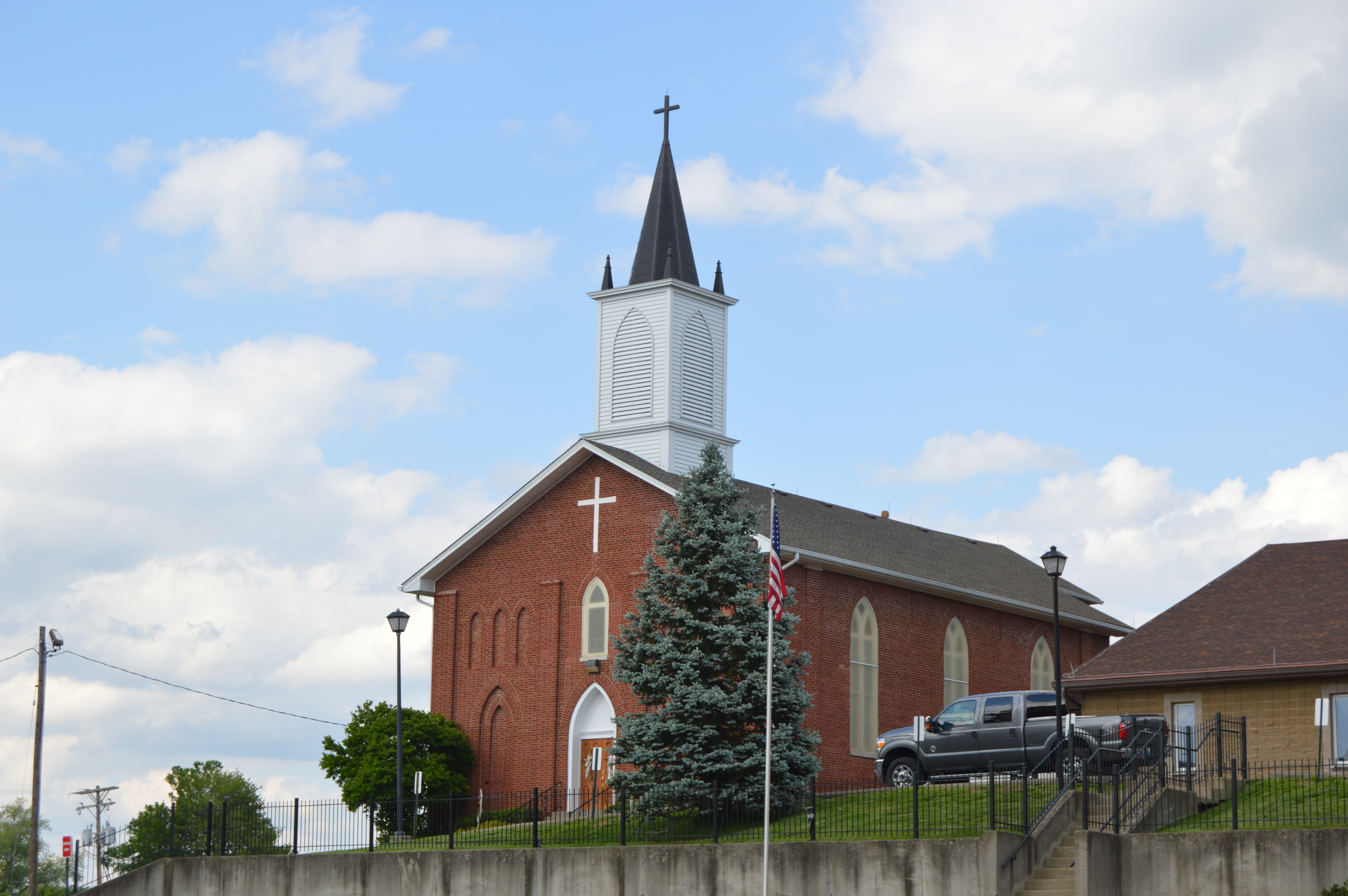
- Front and southern side

- Location within Kentucky Location within the United States
- Location: E. side of Jefferson St. between Park Alley and Red Row Alley, Taylorsville, Kentucky
- Coordinates: 38°1′59″N 85°20′41″W
- Area: 0.1 acres (0.040 ha)
- Built: c.1830-1843
- Architectural style: Gothic Revival
- NRHP reference No.: 92000302
- Added to NRHP: April 2, 1992

The All Saints Catholic Church in Taylorsville, Kentucky is a historic church on the east side of Jefferson Street between Park Alley and Red Row Alley. It was built between 1830 and 1843. It was added to the National Register in 1992.

It has some elements of Gothic Revival in style.

It was deemed significant as "one of the oldest extant Catholic churches in the Louisville archdiocese and as one of the early examples of Gothic Revival architecture used for church construction in the small towns of the region."
