= Charles D. Pennebaker =

American politician (1825–1888)

Member of the Kentucky Senate from the 16th district
- In office August 1, 1859 – July 1862
- Preceded by: Gibson Mallory
- Succeeded by: Isaac P. Miller

Member of the Kentucky House of Representatives from Louisville's 4th district
- In office January 4, 1858 – August 1, 1859
- Preceded by: Peter B. Muir
- Succeeded by: U. C. Sherrill

Member of the Louisville Common Council
- In office April 1854 – April 1856

Personal details
- Born: Charles David Pennebaker; November 3, 1825 Nelson County, Kentucky, US
- Died: June 21, 1888 (aged 62) Washington, D.C., US
- Resting place: Cave Hill Cemetery
- Party: Opposition Party (Southern U.S.)
- Profession: Lawyer

Military service
- Allegiance: United States
- Years of service: March 21, 1862 – April 10, 1864
- Rank: Colonel
- Unit: 27th Kentucky Volunteer Infantry Regiment

Charles David Pennebaker (November 3, 1825 – June 21, 1888) was an American politician, attorney, and soldier. He served in the Kentucky Senate and the Kentucky House of Representatives and played an important role in convincing Kentucky to stay in the Union during the American Civil War. He was a Union colonel during the Civil War and was also Kentucky's military agent in Washington, D.C.

== Early life ==
Pennebaker was born in Nelson County, Kentucky on November 3, 1825. He was of German ancestry.

== Career ==
Pennebaker was a private and second lieutenant with General John Stuart Williams in the 4th Regiment of the Kentucky Volunteers the Mexican–American War from 1846 to July 1848. He became an attorney in Nelson County, Kentucky, in 1850. Later, he moved his law practice to Louisville, Kentucky. By 1859, he had established the firm Boone & Pennebaker with William P. Boone. However, that firm dissolved in 1861 when both men were elected to the Kentucky Senate.

In March 1854, Pennebaker ran for the Louisville common council from the eighth ward and was elected in April. He was re-elected to the common council in April 1855. He declined to run for re-election in 1856. In January 1856, the Kentucky Legislature approved his appointed as a notary for Jefferson County.

During a special election to fill a vacancy, Pennebaker was elected to the Kentucky House of Representatives in 1857, representing Jefferson County from January 4, 1858, to 1859. He ran for the Kentucky Senate in 1859 under the Opposition Party ticket. He was elected and served from 1859 to 1861, again representing Jefferson County. He was a member of the senate's judiciary committee.

Pennebaker opposed Kentucky's secession from the Union. In January 1861, he was chairman of a meeting convened to determine Kentucky's position in the Civil War. Pennebaker was important in getting Kentucky to remain part of the Union.

At the start of the American Civil War in 1861, Pennebaker resigned from the Kentucky Senate. He organized a regiment of at least 700 men by November 1861 as part of the Kentucky State Guard. This regiment was mustered in as the 27th Kentucky Volunteer Infantry Regiment (U.S.A.) in on January 21, 1862, with Pennebaker being elected its colonel. The Louisville Journal noted, "Col. Pennebaker will make an admirable officer; he is a skillful disciplinarian and has endeared him to his soldiers." During the Siege of Knoxville, Pennebaker worked with General James M. Shackleford and Col. Frank Lane Wolford to break the enemy line by charging with the 8th and 11th Texas, the 3rd Arkansas, and Dibrell's Tennessee brigade. His horse during the war was Bob, later the subject of the poem "My War-Horse Bob". He was its colonel until April 10, 1864.

In April 1864, Governor Thomas E. Bramlette appointed Pennebaker to be the Kentucky claim agent in Washington, D.C. Despite the newspaper editorial consensus the he should remain in the military and allow a civilian to fill the position, Pennebaker became the Kentucky claim agent or military agent, starting in April 1864. In this capacity, he sought compensation for supplies taken for commissary stores, horses taken for quartermaster stores, and damages in Kentucky that were cause by military action. He also completed applications and presented any claims of soldiers or their heirs for no charge.

In July 1866, Pennebaker, L. B. Grigsby of Kentucky, and John McGraw of Ohio were charged by the U.S. House of Representatives with witnessing and participating in a premeditated assault by Hon. Lovell Rousseau of Kentucky of the Hon. Josiah B. Grinnell of Iowa. In October 1866, Pennebaker accompanied Governor Bramlette, General Edward H. Hobson, General George W. Monroe, and Col. Wake Holman on a tour of New York and New Jersey to make political speeches to before 10,000 soldiers and civilians in favor of a return to the former Union.

Although some sources indicated his role as a military agent ended in 1865, he was still working as the state's agent in June 1867 when he procured $121,000 ($2,787,321 in 2024) for the Kentucky treasury. In October 1867, he was working on bounties that were still due to soldiers from Kentucky. The Kentucky Senate reaffirmed Pennebaker's position as state claim agent in Washington, D.C. in March 1868; he worked in this capacity for many years.

In 1864, Pennebaker established a law firm in Washington, D.C. His son Charles became a partner in the firm in 1877. In 1883, Pennebaker established the law firm C. D. Pennebaker & Sons with his sons John Speed Pennebaker and Charles D. Pennebaker Jr. The firm specialized in prosecuting claims against the federal government. John left the firm in 1887. However, after John's death, the brothers ended up in court in a dispute between them over the firm and its assets in December 1888.

== Personal life ==
Pennebaker married Anne Eliza Elliott on November 8, 1851, in Nelson County, Kentucky. She was the daughter of a doctor from New Haven, Kentucky. Their children included Charles Darwin Pennebaker, Lulie Pennebaker, Boone Pennebaker, Elliott Pennebaker, and John Speed Pennebaker. He enslaved one person in 1860. When he was sent to Washington, D.C. for work in 1866, the family moved there.

In May 1857, Pennebaker helped organize a citizen military unit called the Falls City Guard and was elected its captain. However, he resigned from the citizen guard in December 1857. Pennebaker served on the national central executive committee of The State and the National Convention of Union Soldiers and Sailors, which was held in Cleveland, Ohio on February 22, 1868. In 1879, he served on the committee that helped organize the 11th annual reunion of the Society of the Army of the Cumberland in Washington, D.C.

In January 1852, Pennebaker was on the committee that invited Lajos Kossuth, the exiled Hungarian freedom fighter, to Louisville. In April 1884, he was elected as one of the founding secretaries of the National Protective League. He was a member of Calvary Episcopal Church in Louisville.

He was "dangerously ill" in July 1869; he recovered but was sick again in early May 1888 with an illness he contracted during the Mexican-American War. Pennebaker died on June 21, 1888, at his home on Corcoran Street in Washington, D.C. He was buried in Cave Hill Cemetery in Louisville, Kentucky.
