= L. W. Ross House =

- U.S. National Register of Historic Places
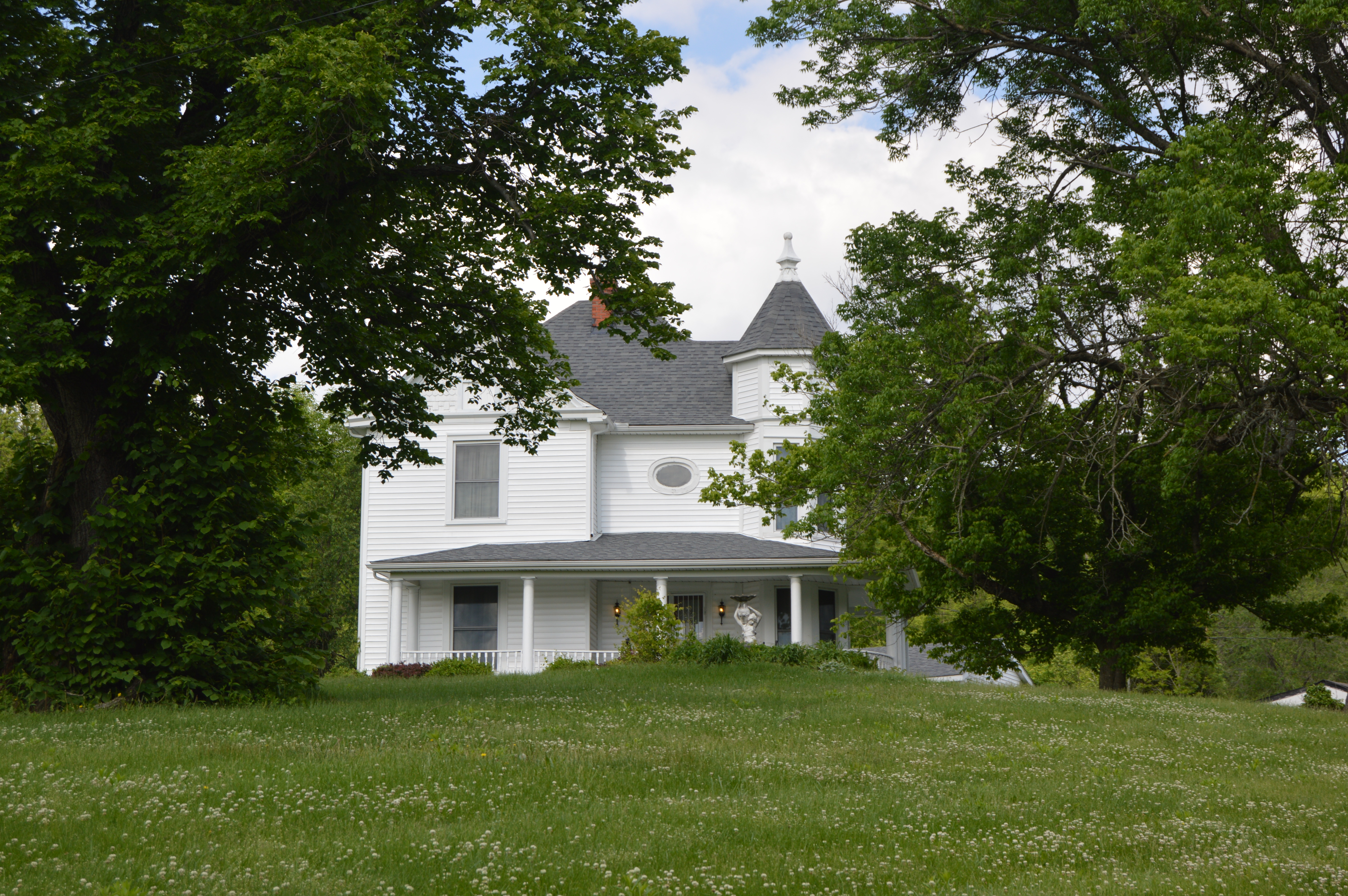

- Location within Kentucky Location within the United States
- Location: Northern side of Kentucky Route 44 east of Taylorsville, Kentucky
- Coordinates: 38°01′58″N 85°20′17″W
- Area: 1 acre (0.40 ha)
- Built: c.1896
- Architectural style: Queen Anne
- NRHP reference No.: 92000299
- Added to NRHP: April 2, 1992

The L. W. Ross House, near Taylorsville, Kentucky, is a historic house with Queen Anne-style influences which was built in about 1896. It was listed on the National Register of Historic Places in 1992.

It has a hipped roof with gabled-roof extensions, and an octagonal tower.
