= Minor Chapel AME Church =

Historic church in Kentucky, United States

- Minor Chapel A. M. E. Church
- U.S. National Register of Historic Places
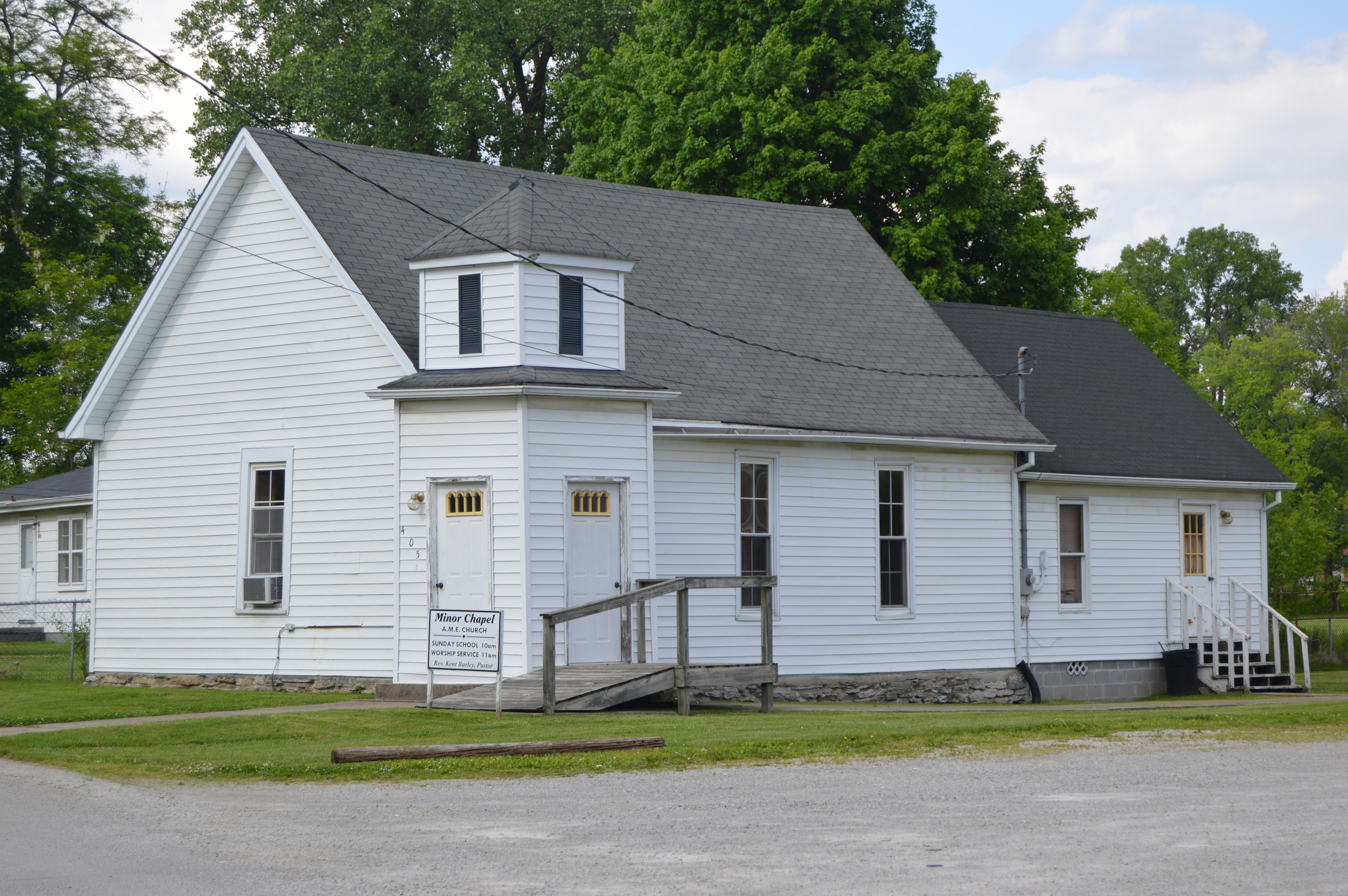
- Front and southern side

- Location within Kentucky Location within the United States
- Location: E. side of Jefferson St. between Red Row Alley and Reasor St., Taylorsville, Kentucky
- Coordinates: 38°1′58.6″N 85°20′34.2″W
- Area: 0.2 acres (0.081 ha)
- Built: c.1895
- Architectural style: Vernacular Victorian-era
- NRHP reference No.: 92000300
- Added to NRHP: April 2, 1992

Minor Chapel A. M. E. Church is a historic African Methodist Episcopal church on the east side of Jefferson Street between Red Row Alley and Reasor Street in Taylorsville, Kentucky. It was built in about 1895 and added to the National Register in 1992.

It is a wood-frame church on a dry-laid limestone foundation.
