= Jack Bellman =

American baseball player (1864–1931)

- Catcher
- Born: March 4, 1864; Taylorsville, Kentucky, U.S.
- Died: December 8, 1931 (aged 67); Louisville, Kentucky, U.S.
- Batted: Unknown Threw: Unknown

MLB debut
- April 23, 1889, for the St. Louis Browns

Last MLB appearance
- April 23, 1889, for the St. Louis Browns

MLB statistics
- Batting average: .500
- Hits: 1
- Runs scored: 1
- Stats at Baseball Reference

Teams
- St. Louis Browns (1889)

John Hutchins "Happy Jack" Bellman (March 4, 1864 – December 8, 1931) was an American Major League Baseball catcher. He played professionally for the St. Louis Browns.

Bellman was born in Taylorsville, Kentucky. He played one game for the St. Louis Browns, on April 23, 1889.

Bellman died on December 8, 1931, in Louisville, Kentucky and is interred at Calvary Cemetery in Louisville.
