= New Hope, Kentucky =

Unincorporated community in Kentucky, United States

- Unincorporated community
- Location within Kentucky Location within the United States
- Coordinates: 37°37′55″N 85°30′30″W
- Country: United States
- State: Kentucky
- County: Nelson

Area
  - Total: 0.62 sq mi (1.61 km^{2})
  - Land: 0.62 sq mi (1.60 km^{2})
  - Water: 0.0039 sq mi (0.01 km^{2})
- Elevation: 545 ft (166 m)

Population (2020)
  - Total: 139
  - Density: 225.1/sq mi (86.91/km^{2})
- Time zone: UTC-5 (Eastern (EST))
  - Summer (DST): UTC-4 (EDT)
- ZIP code: 40052
- Area code: 502
- GNIS feature ID: 499337

New Hope is an unincorporated community and census-designated place in Nelson County, Kentucky, United States. As of the 2020 census, New Hope had a population of 139. New Hope has a post office with ZIP code 40052, which opened on April 5, 1844.

== Geography ==
According to the U.S. Census Bureau, the community has an area of 0.622 square miles (1.61 km^{2}); 0.617 square miles (1.60 km^{2}) of its area is land, and 0.005 square miles (0.013 km^{2}) is water.

== Demographics ==
Historical population
Census	Pop.	Note	%±
2020	139		—
U.S. Decennial Census
