= Nelson County, Kentucky =

County in Kentucky, United States

- County
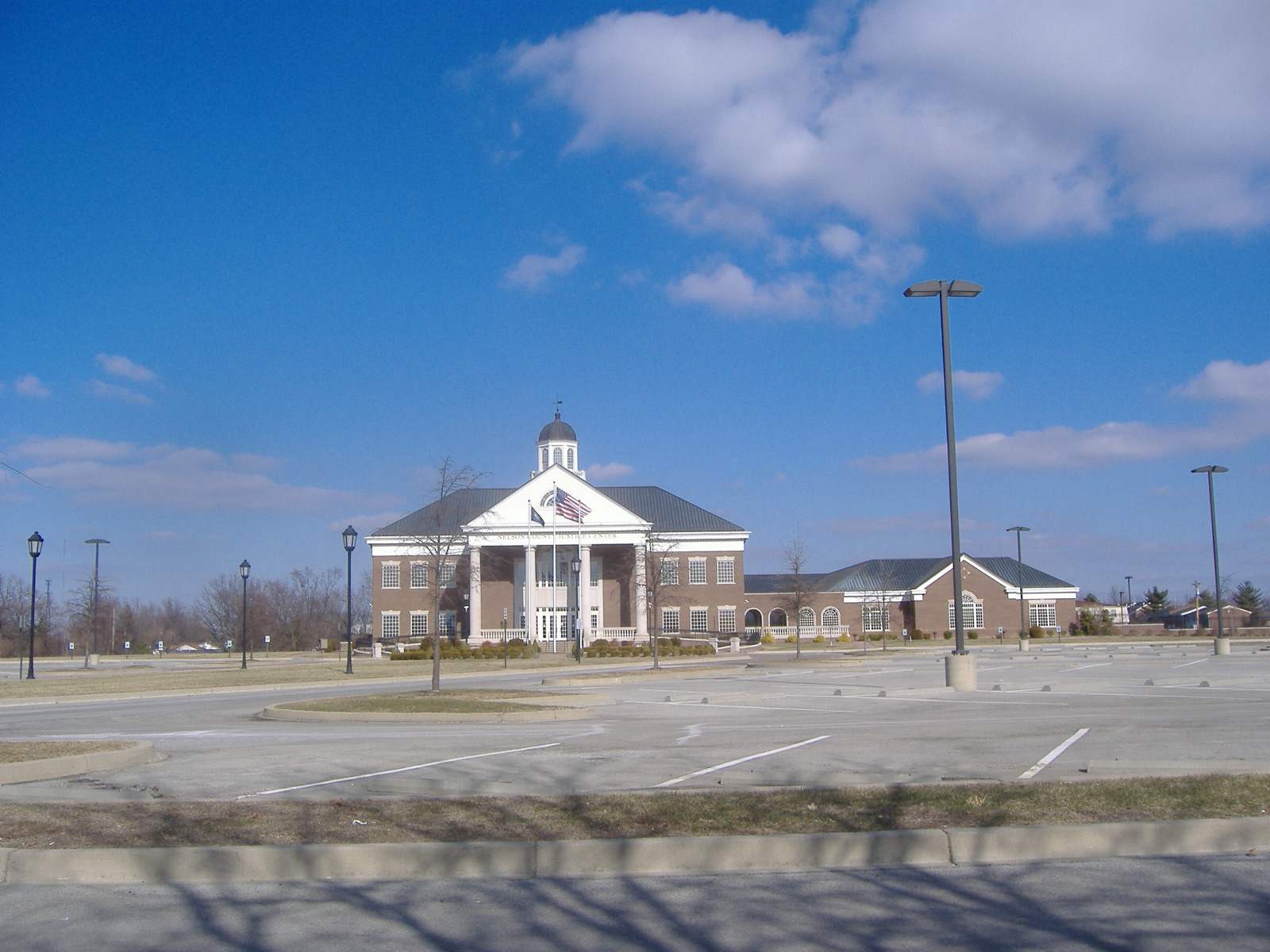
- Nelson County Courthouse in Bardstown

- Location within the U.S. state of Kentucky
- Coordinates: 37°48′N 85°28′W
- Country: United States
- State: Kentucky
- Founded: November 29, 1784
- Named for: Thomas Nelson Jr.
- Seat: Bardstown
- Largest city: Bardstown

Government
  - Judge/Executive: Timothy Hutchins (R)

Area
  - Total: 424 sq mi (1,100 km^{2})
  - Land: 418 sq mi (1,080 km^{2})
  - Water: 6.6 sq mi (17 km^{2}) 1.5%

Population (2020)
  - Total: 46,738
  - Estimate (2025): 49,036 ▲
  - Density: 112/sq mi (43.2/km^{2})
- Time zone: UTC−5 (Eastern)
  - Summer (DST): UTC−4 (EDT)
- Congressional districts: 2nd, 4th
- Website: nelsoncountyky.gov

Nelson County is a county located in the U.S. state of Kentucky. As of the 2020 census, the population was 46,738. Its county seat is Bardstown. Nelson County comprises the Bardstown, KY Micropolitan Statistical Area, which is also included in the Louisville/Jefferson County-Elizabethtown-Madison, KY-IN Combined Statistical Area.

== History ==
The fourth county created in what is now Kentucky, it was formed from Jefferson County, Kentucky in 1784, shortly after the Revolutionary War. The county was named for Thomas Nelson Jr., the Virginia governor who signed the Declaration of Independence. In 1807, after Kentucky had become a state, a newly created Virginia county was named in his honor.

== Geography ==
According to the United States Census Bureau, the county has a total area of 424 square miles (1,100 km^{2}), of which 418 square miles (1,080 km^{2}) are land and 6.6 square miles (17 km^{2}) (1.5%) are covered by water.

=== Adjacent counties ===
- Spencer County (north)
- Anderson County (northeast)
- Washington County (east)
- Marion County (southeast)
- LaRue County (south)
- Hardin County (west)
- Bullitt County (northwest)

== Demographics ==
Historical population
Census	Pop.	Note	%±
1790	11,315		—
1800	9,866		−12.8%
1810	14,078		42.7%
1820	16,273		15.6%
1830	14,932		−8.2%
1840	13,637		−8.7%
1850	14,789		8.4%
1860	15,799		6.8%
1870	14,804		−6.3%
1880	16,609		12.2%
1890	16,417		−1.2%
1900	16,587		1.0%
1910	16,830		1.5%
1920	16,137		−4.1%
1930	16,551		2.6%
1940	18,004		8.8%
1950	19,521		8.4%
1960	22,168		13.6%
1970	23,477		5.9%
1980	27,584		17.5%
1990	29,710		7.7%
2000	37,477		26.1%
2010	43,437		15.9%
2020	46,738		7.6%
2025 (est.)	49,036	▲	4.9%
U.S. Decennial Census; 1790–1960 1900–1990; 1990–2000 2010–2020

=== 2020 census ===
As of the 2020 census, the county had a population of 46,738. The median age was 40.7 years. 23.5% of residents were under the age of 18 and 17.1% of residents were 65 years of age or older. For every 100 females there were 97.9 males, and for every 100 females age 18 and over there were 94.6 males age 18 and over.

The racial makeup of the county was 88.8% White, 4.7% Black or African American, 0.2% American Indian and Alaska Native, 0.6% Asian, 0.0% Native Hawaiian and Pacific Islander, 1.0% from some other race, and 4.7% from two or more races. Hispanic or Latino residents of any race comprised 2.6% of the population.

37.8% of residents lived in urban areas, while 62.2% lived in rural areas.

There were 18,462 households in the county, of which 32.4% had children under the age of 18 living with them and 24.4% had a female householder with no spouse or partner present. About 25.6% of all households were made up of individuals and 10.8% had someone living alone who was 65 years of age or older.

There were 19,716 housing units, of which 6.4% were vacant. Among occupied housing units, 75.9% were owner-occupied and 24.1% were renter-occupied. The homeowner vacancy rate was 1.1% and the rental vacancy rate was 6.1%.

=== 2010 census ===
As of the census of 2010, 43,437 people inhabited the county. The population density was 102.4 per square mile (39.5/km^{2}). Its 18,075 housing units averaged 42.6 per square mile (16.4/km^{2}).

The racial makeup of the county in 2010 was 93.48% White (90.93% non-Hispanic), 5.03% Black or African American, 0.12% Native American, 0.50% Asian, 0.02% Pacific Islander, 0.78% from other races, and 1.62% from two or more races. About 2.04% of the population was Hispanic or Latino of any race.

Of the 16,826 households, 36.60% had children under the age of 18 living with them, 52.09% were married couples living together, 13.19% had a female householder with no husband present, 5.35% had a male householder with no wife present, and 29.37% were not families. Of all households, 24.41% were made up of individuals, and 8.09% had someone living alone who was 65 years of age or older. The average household size was 2.55 and the average family size was 3.01.

The age distribution was 25.98% under 18, 7.98% from 18 to 24, 26.47% from 25 to 44, 27.84% from 45 to 64, and 11.73% who were 65 or older. The median age was 37.7 years. For every 100 females, there were 96.80 males. For every 100 females age 18 and over, there were 93.60 males.

Income data for Kentucky locations from the 2010 Census have not yet been released. As of the 2000 census, the median income for a household in the county was $39,010, and for a family was $44,600. Males had a median income of $32,015 versus $21,838 for females. The per capita income for the county was $18,120. About 10.00% of families and 12.20% of the population were below the poverty line, including 15.70% of those under age 18 and 17.40% of those age 65 or over.

== Economy ==
Nelson County is primarily known for its connection to bourbon, earning the title "Bourbon Capital of the World" for its high concentration of distilleries in and around Bardstown and Boston.

== Education ==
Two public school districts operate in the county:

- The Nelson County School District serves K–12 students throughout the county, with the exception of most of the city of Bardstown and developed areas near the city limits. The district operates two K–8 schools, two elementary schools, two middle schools, an alternative school, a vocational-technical school, and two high schools.
- The Bardstown City Schools serve students in most of the city of Bardstown, as well as much of the developed area immediately adjacent to the city limits. However, some areas of the city are instead served by the Nelson County district, and some of the Nelson County schools are physically within the Bardstown district. The district operates a preschool, an ungraded primary school (K–2), one elementary school, one middle school, and one high school. The preschool and primary school occupy separate buildings on adjacent plots of land in the north of the city, and the other schools are adjacent to one another near downtown.

Several private schools also operate in the county. The Roman Catholic Archdiocese of Louisville operates five schools in all—three K–8 schools, a fourth that educates grades 1 through 8, and one high school. Several Protestant-affiliated schools also exist.

== Infrastructure ==
=== Major highways ===
The following are the Parkways, US Highways, and Kentucky State Highways in Nelson County:

- Bluegrass Parkway
- US 31E
- US 62
- US 150
- KY 46
- KY 48
- KY 49
- KY 50
- KY 52
- KY 55
- KY 61
- KY 84
- KY 162
- KY 245
- KY 247
- KY 332
- KY 457
- KY 458
- KY 462
- KY 480
- KY 509
- KY 523
- KY 555
- KY 605
- KY 652
- KY 660
- KY 733
- KY 1066
- KY 1430
- KY 1754
- KY 1858
- KY 1873
- KY 2230
- KY 2735
- KY 2737
- KY 2738
- KY 2739
- KY 2775
- KY 3207
- KY 3358

== Politics ==
United States presidential election results for Nelson County, Kentucky
Year	Republican		Democratic		Third party(ies)	
Year	No.	%	No.	%	No.	%
1912	751	19.85%	2,275	60.12%	758	20.03%
1916	1,546	36.64%	2,639	62.54%	35	0.83%
1920	2,945	36.66%	5,061	63.00%	27	0.34%
1924	2,082	34.56%	3,863	64.13%	79	1.31%
1928	2,926	42.04%	4,031	57.92%	3	0.04%
1932	2,100	28.37%	5,272	71.23%	29	0.39%
1936	1,913	30.09%	4,234	66.59%	211	3.32%
1940	2,109	33.42%	4,193	66.45%	8	0.13%
1944	2,136	36.76%	3,648	62.78%	27	0.46%
1948	1,715	31.75%	3,556	65.84%	130	2.41%
1952	3,064	47.18%	3,417	52.62%	13	0.20%
1956	4,107	55.76%	3,240	43.99%	18	0.24%
1960	3,021	39.06%	4,713	60.94%	0	0.00%
1964	1,683	23.07%	5,586	76.56%	27	0.37%
1968	2,373	34.31%	3,420	49.45%	1,123	16.24%
1972	3,495	53.54%	2,828	43.32%	205	3.14%
1976	2,804	37.37%	4,454	59.36%	246	3.28%
1980	3,349	36.75%	5,514	60.50%	251	2.75%
1984	6,044	58.57%	4,199	40.69%	76	0.74%
1988	5,283	51.90%	4,788	47.04%	108	1.06%
1992	4,495	38.51%	5,437	46.58%	1,740	14.91%
1996	4,645	41.63%	5,392	48.32%	1,122	10.05%
2000	7,714	57.19%	5,481	40.64%	293	2.17%
2004	10,161	60.32%	6,524	38.73%	159	0.94%
2008	10,139	55.87%	7,654	42.18%	353	1.95%
2012	10,673	57.59%	7,611	41.07%	249	1.34%
2016	13,431	64.57%	6,434	30.93%	937	4.50%
2020	15,703	67.52%	7,188	30.91%	365	1.57%
2024	16,052	70.24%	6,515	28.51%	285	1.25%

The county voted "No" on 2022 Kentucky Amendment 2, an anti-abortion ballot measure, by 51% to 49% despite backing Donald Trump with 68% of the vote to Joe Biden's 31% in the 2020 presidential election.

On March 5, 2025, current Nelson County Sheriff Nelson Pineiora and Chief Deputy Brandon Bryan were each indicted on felony charges involving of public trust, theft by deception and official misconduct. Deputy Chief Bryan would also receive an additional charge of forgery. The charges stem from their role in an illegal sale of at least three vehicles from a local evidence warehouse.

=== Elected officials ===
Elected officials as of January 3, 2025
U.S. House	Brett Guthrie (R)	KY 2
U.S. House	Thomas Massie (R)	KY 4
Ky. Senate	Jimmy Higdon (R)	14
Ky. House	Candy Massaroni (R)	50

== Attractions and events ==
Many attractions and events are available in Bardstown. The following is outside the county seat:

- Rooster Run is a general store located on Kentucky Route 245 halfway between Bardstown and Clermont, well known for baseball caps featuring its logo and a 13.5-foot-tall (4.1 m) fiberglass rooster statue standing in front of the store. According to The Kentucky Encyclopedia, it is "one of the best-known general stores in the country and one of Kentucky's best-known unincorporated businesses".

== Communities ==
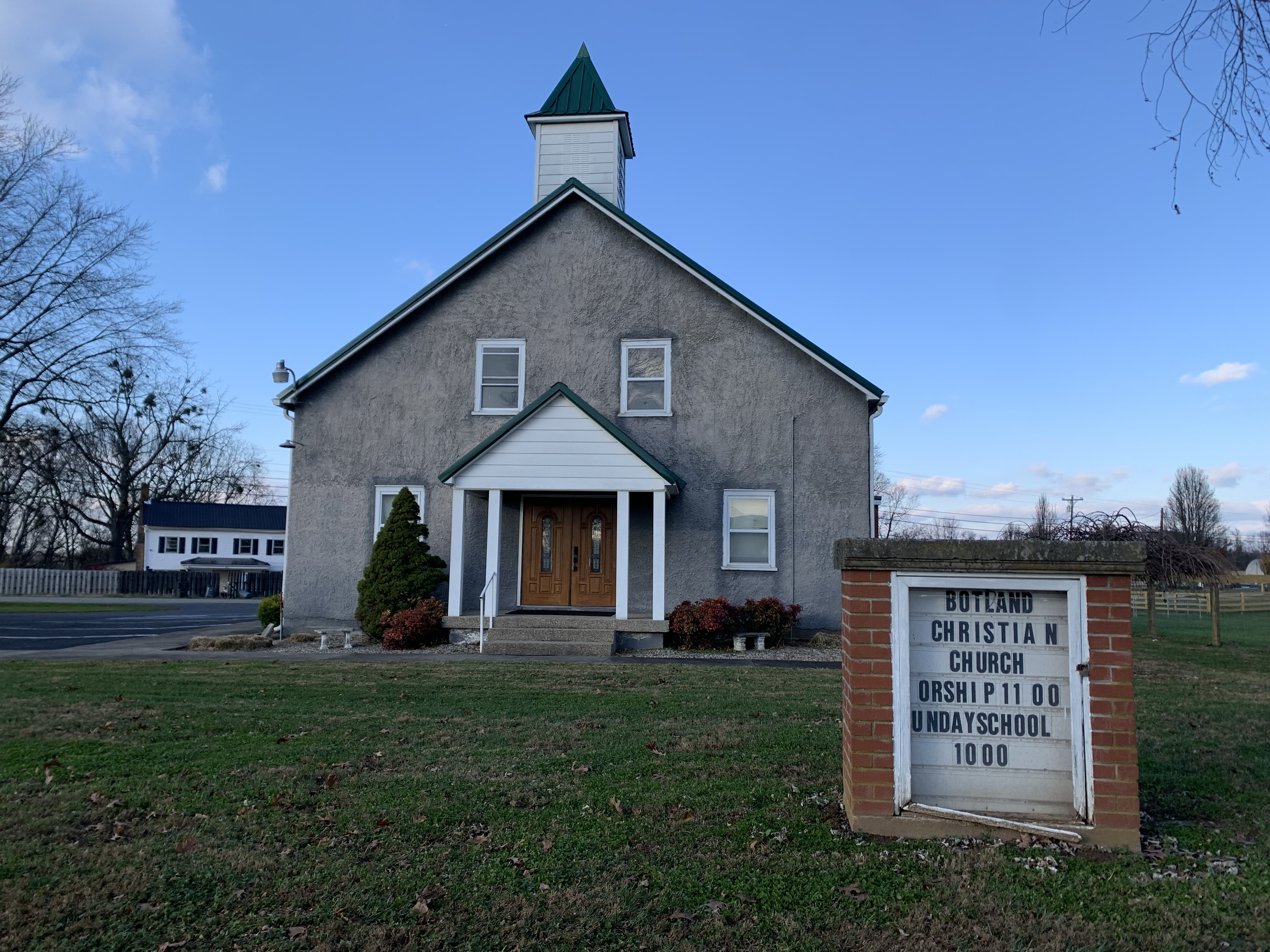
Botland Christian Church at Botland

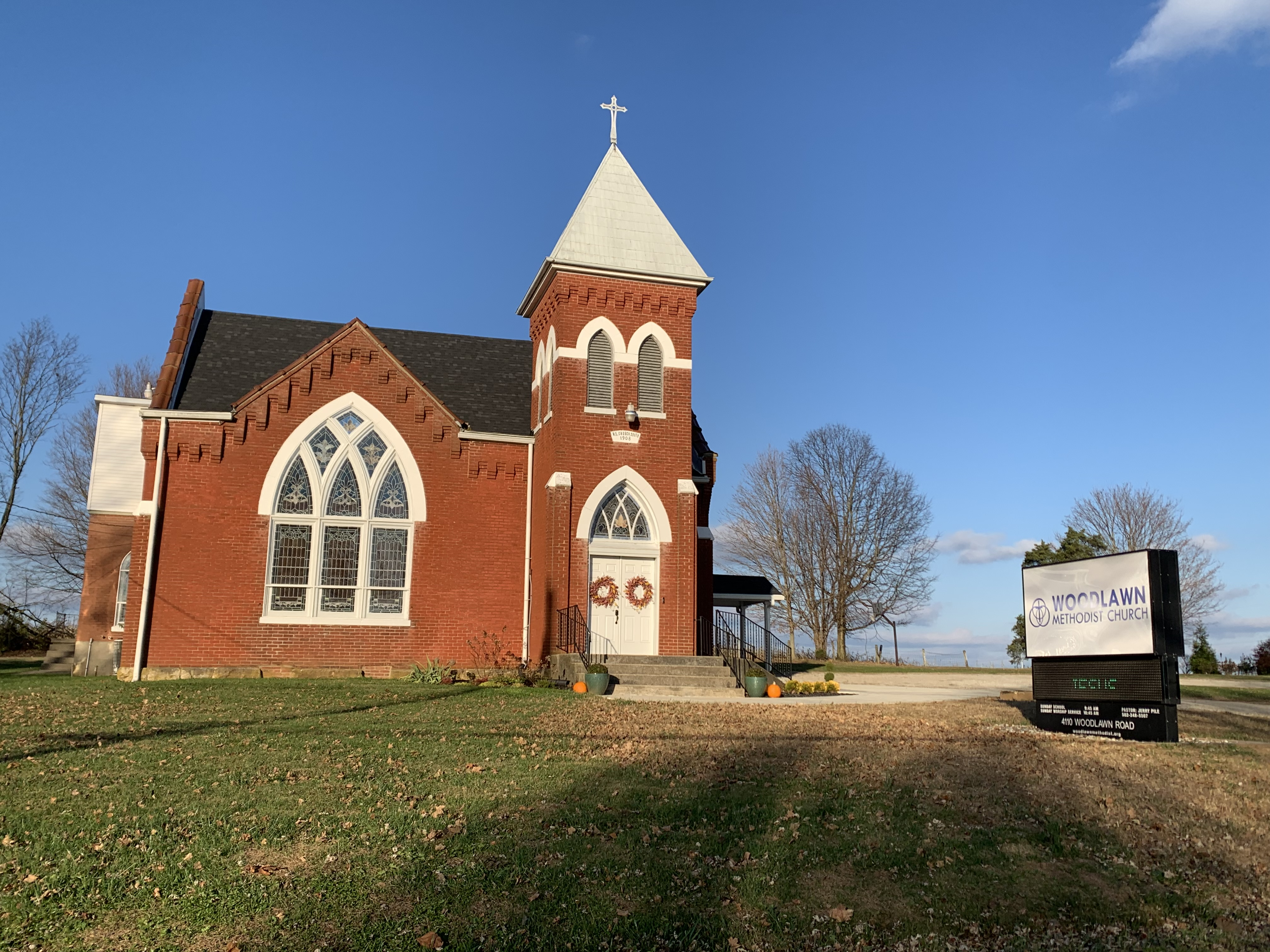
Woodlawn Methodist Church at Woodlawn

=== Cities ===
- Bardstown (county seat)
- Bloomfield
- Fairfield
- New Haven

=== Census-designated places ===
- Boston
- Chaplin
- New Hope

=== Other unincorporated places ===
- Balltown
- Bellwood
- Blue Gap
- Botland
- Bourbon Springs
- Cedar Creek
- Coxs Creek
- Cravens
- Culvertown
- Deatsville
- East Bardstown
- Fairfield
- Gethsemane
- Greenbrier
- Highgrove
- Howardstown
- Hunters
- Icetown
- Lenore
- Nazareth
- Nelsonville
- Saint Thomas
- Samuels
- Stiles
- Trappist
- Winthrow
- Woodlawn

== Notable people ==
- William Beall; general in the Confederate Army
- J. C. W. Beckham; Governor of Kentucky
- Linda Bruckheimer; novelist and historic preservation activist
- Joseph Seamon Cotter Sr.; poet
- Henry Pierson Crowe; US Marine
- Ephraim H. Foster; Senator of Tennessee
- James B. Graham; Kentucky Auditor of Public Accounts
- Benjamin E. Grey; Congressman
- Joseph Hanks; great-grandfather of US President Abraham Lincoln
- Ben Johnson; lawyer and congressman
- Silvester Johnson; merchant
- Monique Jones; professional bodybuilder
- Virgil Livers; football cornerback
- James Love; congressman
- Joseph N. McCormack; surgeon
- Thomas Merton; monk
- Zachariah Montgomery; lawyer and politician
- Charles S. Morehead; congressman and governor of Kentucky
- Charles D. Pennebaker, politician and colonel
- Felix Newton Pitt; monsignor
- Daniel Rudd; catholic journalist and civil rights leader
- Catherine Spalding; religious leader
- Horace Speed; pioneer and district attorney
- Stith Thompson; scholar of folklore
- Bryan Young; congressman
- William Singleton Young; congressman

== See also ==
- List of counties in Kentucky
- Abbey of Our Lady of Gethsemani
- National Register of Historic Places listings in Nelson County, Kentucky
