= Coxs Creek, Kentucky =

Unincorporated community in Kentucky, United States

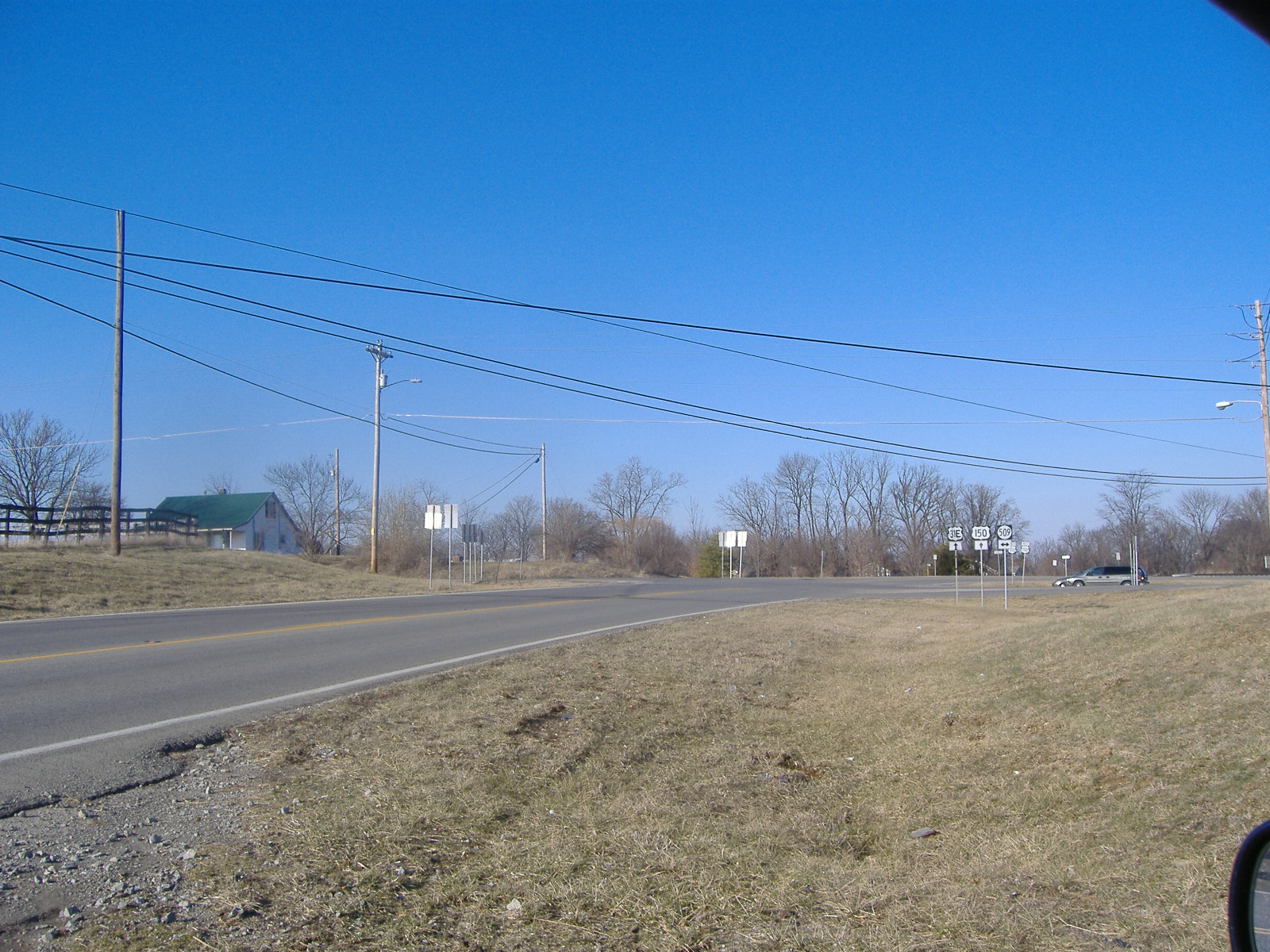
Crossroads of U.S. Route 31E and Kentucky State Route 509 in Coxs Creek, Kentucky

Coxs Creek, Kentucky is an unincorporated community along U.S. Routes 31E/150 (known locally as Louisville Road) in Nelson County, Kentucky, United States, about 4.5 miles north of Bardstown. It is named for Colonel Isaac Cox of Pennsylvania, who established a fortified station on Coxs Creek. Some sources state construction began as early as April 1775, while contemporaneous depositions and early county tax records indicate that the Cox family's Kentucky migration and settlement were underway by 1780, including Isaac's brother David Cox.

References to Cox's Creek appear in the Virginia Land Commission certificate books in 1779 and 1780, recording settlement claims at the site and referring retrospectively to 1776, when Isaac Cox first explored the area. By 1785 a church and school were operating nearby, and the community endured thereafter. Cox's Station is credited in local histories as the first pioneer station in what is now Nelson County. The Coxs Creek Post Office, opened in 1856, stands near the original station area, and Coxs Creek Baptist Church remains an active congregation in the community.

Isaac Cox was killed by Native Americans in 1788; his will, dated September 5, 1786, was proved in Nelson County on April 8, 1788.

Kentucky's second Baptist association was formed at Coxs Creek on October 29, 1785. The first post office opened on November 28, 1856, with John C. Cox as postmaster.

The nearby stream, also named Coxs Creek, is a tributary of the Salt River. Elevations range from about 650 to 736 feet above sea level. The community is served by Cox's Creek Elementary School. Its latitude and longitude are 37.899° N, 85.474° W. The ZIP Code is 40013.

== Bibliography ==
- Hoeing, J.B. (1914). Reports By Kentucky State Geologist. Frankfort, Kentucky: Kentucky State Government.
- Kerr, Charles; William Elsey Connelley; Ellis Merton Coulter (1922). History of Kentucky. The American Historical Society.
- Rennick, Robert M. (1988). Kentucky Place Names. University Press of Kentucky. ISBN 0-8131-0179-4.
- Simon, F. Kevin (1996). The WPA Guide to Kentucky: A Guide to the Bluegrass State. University Press of Kentucky. ISBN 0-8131-0865-9.
- Taylor, John; Chester Raymond Young (1995). Baptists on the American Frontier. Mercer University Press. ISBN 0-8655-4479-4.
