= Lillian H. South =

American physician

Lillian Herald South
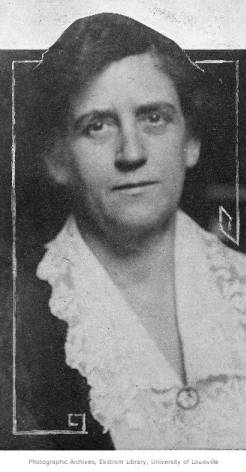
- Born: January 31, 1879; Bowling Green, Kentucky
- Died: September 13, 1966 (aged 87)
- Education: Woman's Medical College of Pennsylvania
- Occupations: Physician, bacteriologist
- Known for: Research on hookworms, rabies and leprosy
- Spouse: Hiram H. Tye

Lillian Herald South Tye (January 31, 1879 – September 13, 1966) was an American physician from Bowling Green, Kentucky, who specialized in public health. South was a pioneer in her work as a bacteriologist, and she was a trailblazer as a female medical professional who broke prevalent gender barriers for women of her time.

South was the Director of the Kentucky State Bacteriology Laboratory for thirty-nine years. She is credited with eliminating several contagious diseases from Kentucky, including hookworm. South was involved with containing a severe epidemic of typhoid following the widespread flooding in 1937.

South's work brought her national prominence, and she frequently presented her work to medical associations and the public across the country. In 1922 South established the first lab technician training program in the United States; the graduates of the program worked in medical laboratories around the world. She was heavily involved with medical organizations, and was the first woman to hold the position of vice president of the American Medical Association.

== Family and early life ==
Lillian Herald South, the daughter of Dr. John F. and Martha (Moore) South, was born in Bowling Green, Kentucky on January 31, 1879.

South attended local public schools in Warren County and after graduation from high school, she went to Potter College, a local college. She completed a B.A. degree at the age of 18. South then left the state to attend a nurses training program in New Jersey. In 1896, she graduated from the Nurses Training School of the Central Hospital at Paterson, New Jersey. She furthered her schooling by studying medicine at the Woman's Medical College of Pennsylvania (now part of Drexel University). After graduating in 1903, she interned to study bacteriology. When she completed her internship, for a short period of time, she joined a medical practice in Bowling Green with her father who was a physician. Then South joined the medical practice of Dr. J. N. McCormack and Dr. A.T. McCormack.

== Career ==
=== St. Joseph's Hospital ===
In 1906, South and her medical partners opened a health care facility in order to make local hospital care available to the people of Warren County. She remodeled and enlarged her house in Bowling Green to establish St. Joseph's Hospital. The hospital, with 42 beds, allowed the local physicians to offer around the clock local medical and nursing care to their own patients, and provide care to the young people who temporarily relocated to Bowling Green for their education.

=== Kentucky State Board of Health ===
In 1910, South was employed by the State Board of Health as the State Bacteriologist. From this position, South became a major influence on public health in the United States through her medical research and training programs. She also had a large positive impact on the health and well-being of Kentucky's people through the medical services she provided through the State Laboratory.

Through her work at the State Board of Health, South's research into hookworms, rabies, and leprosy lowered the incidents of the diseases in Kentucky. She led a public campaign to eliminate hookworm and is credited for virtually eradicating the once widely prevalent disease from the state. She lobbied the Kentucky State Legislature to ban the use of the public drinking cup.

=== Medical Associations ===
South was heavily involved with local and national medical organizations, and had leadership roles in prominent medical associations. She was an active member of the American Association for the Advancement of Science. She was the first women to hold the position of vice president with the American Medical Association. She was president of the Association of Southern Medical Women, and councilor of the American Association of Medical Women. And she was an active member of the Kentucky Medical Association, the Jefferson County Medical Society, and the Tri-County Medical Society.

Throughout her life, South continued to study the newest medical scientific advances and traveled extensively to learn as much as she could. She studied at Johns Hopkins, Mayo Clinic, the Pasteur Lab in Paris, and the Madame Curie Radium Institute. She was a delegate to the International Hygiene Congress in Dresden, Germany, and to the Public Health Division of the League of Nations in Geneva, Switzerland.

== Later family life ==
On July 8, 1926, South married Judge Hiram H. Tye, a well-known attorney and judge from Whitley County, Kentucky. Tye had a law practice, Tye & Siler, that was the local attorneys for the Louisville & Nashville Railroad; the Southern Railway; the Cincinnati, New Orleans & Texas Pacific Railway; the Western Union Telegraph Company, and other prominent coal-mining related corporations.

South kept a separate residence from her husband during the week in order to continue her medical career. On weekends and holidays she traveled to stay at their shared house in Williamsburg, Kentucky. He died on July 3, 1948.
