= Kentucky Route 48 =

State highway in Kentucky, United States

Kentucky Route 48

Route information
- Maintained by KYTC
- Length: 11.040 mi (17.767 km)

Major junctions
- West end: US 31E / US 150 near Highgrove
- East end: US 62 / KY 55 in Bloomfield

Location
- Country: United States
- State: Kentucky
- Counties: Nelson, Spencer

Highway system
- Kentucky State Highway System; Interstate; US; State; Parkways
← KY 47	→ KY 49

Kentucky Route 48 (KY 48) is an 11-mile-long (18 km) state highway in the U.S. state of Kentucky. KY 48 runs from U.S. Route 31E (US 31E) and U.S. Route 150 (US 150) in Highgrove to US 62 and KY 55 in Bloomfield, passing through the community of Fairfield.

== Route description ==
KY 48 travels southeast from US 31E in Nelson County. After about 1.5 miles (2.4 km) southeast of Highgrove, KY 48 enters Spencer County and straddles the county line before reentering Nelson County west of Fairfield. After passing through Fairfield, KY 48 begins heading eastward before terminating at US 62 and KY 55 in Bloomfield.

== Major intersections ==
County	Location	mi	km	Destinations	Notes
Nelson	Highgrove	0.000	0.000	US 31E (Louisville Road) / Crenshaw Lane	Western terminus
Spencer		4.121	6.632	KY 623 north (Lilly Pike)	Southern terminus of KY 623
Nelson		6.370	10.252	KY 509 west (Fairfield Road)	Eastern terminus of KY 509
Nelson	Fairfield	7.001	11.267	KY 652 north (Little Union Road)	Southern terminus of KY 652
Nelson	Bloomfield	10.908	17.555	KY 162 west (Bardstown Road)	Eastern terminus of KY 162
Nelson	Bloomfield	11.040	17.767	US 62 (Springfield Road / Chaplin Road) / KY 55 (Taylorsville Road)	Eastern terminus
1.000 mi = 1.609 km; 1.000 km = 0.621 mi
