= Association of State and Territorial Health Officials =

United States health association

The Association of State and Territorial Health Officials (ASTHO) represents the public health agencies of all 50 states in the United States, the District of Columbia, the five U.S. territories, and the three freely associated states. ASTHO members, the chief health officials in each of these jurisdictions, formulate and influence public health policy and work to protect and promote good health in the populations they serve. Its CEO is Joseph Kanter.

== Purpose ==
ASTHO assists state health agencies by collecting and disseminating promising public health practices, facilitating or directly providing technical assistance, and providing opportunities for state health agency staff to learn from each other.

== History ==
The origin of health officials from the states getting together to discuss matters of public health concern that spanned state boundaries is the organization and first meeting of the Sanitary Council of the Mississippi Valley in 1879, a meeting to address limiting the spread of yellow fever and cholera outbreaks. In 1903, the U.S. Surgeon General began convening an annual meeting of state health officers to discuss controlling yellow fever and other diseases prevalent at the time. After the Social Security Act of 1935 specified appropriations to states for the purpose of public health, state public health officers saw the need for a more formal organization, leading to the incorporation of ASTHO on March 23, 1942.

== Governance ==
ASTHO is governed by a board of directors comprised by five executive officers and 10 regional representatives as well as four nonvoting, ex-officio members representing important constituents. The board receives input from the following committees, most of which include a mix of state health officials, state health agency department heads, and other public health leaders: Senior Deputies Committee, Affiliate Council, Access Policy Committee, eHealth Policy Committee, Environmental Health Policy Committee, Infectious Disease Policy Committee, Performance Policy Committee, Preparedness Policy Committee, Prevention Policy Committee, and Government Relations Policy Committee.

== Recent publications ==
- Neonatal Abstinence Syndrome: How States Can Help Advance the Knowledge Base for Primary Prevention and Best Practices of Care — A policy primer giving an array of strategies and examples for state health agencies to deal with babies being born addicted to opioids.
- 2014 State Legislative and Regulatory Prospectus — A report examining trends in pre-filed, public health-related bills filed in state legislatures including regulation of compounding pharmacies, drug shortages, and violence prevention
- Making the Case for Infectious Disease Infrastructure — A communications toolkit funded by the Centers for Disease Control and Prevention that stresses the importance of state health agencies' ability to quickly detect and respond to infectious diseases.
- Role of the State and Territorial Health Official in Promoting Health Equity — A report explaining how state health agencies can promote a health equity agenda across agency programs and throughout state government.

== Chief Executive Officer ==
From June 2006 to January 2016, Paul Jarris was Chief Executive Officer. Jarris was the Commissioner of Health at the Vermont Department of Health from 2003 to 2006.

From August 2016 to March 2024, Michael Fraser was Chief Executive Officer. He also was CEO of the Association of Maternal and Child Health Programs (AMCHP) from 2007 to 2013 and deputy executive director of the National Association of County and City Health Officials from 2002 to 2007.

In April 2024, ASTHO welcomed Joseph Kanter as CEO. Kanter was the State Health Officer at the Louisiana Department of Health from January 2021 to February 2024.
