= Fairfield, Kentucky =

- City
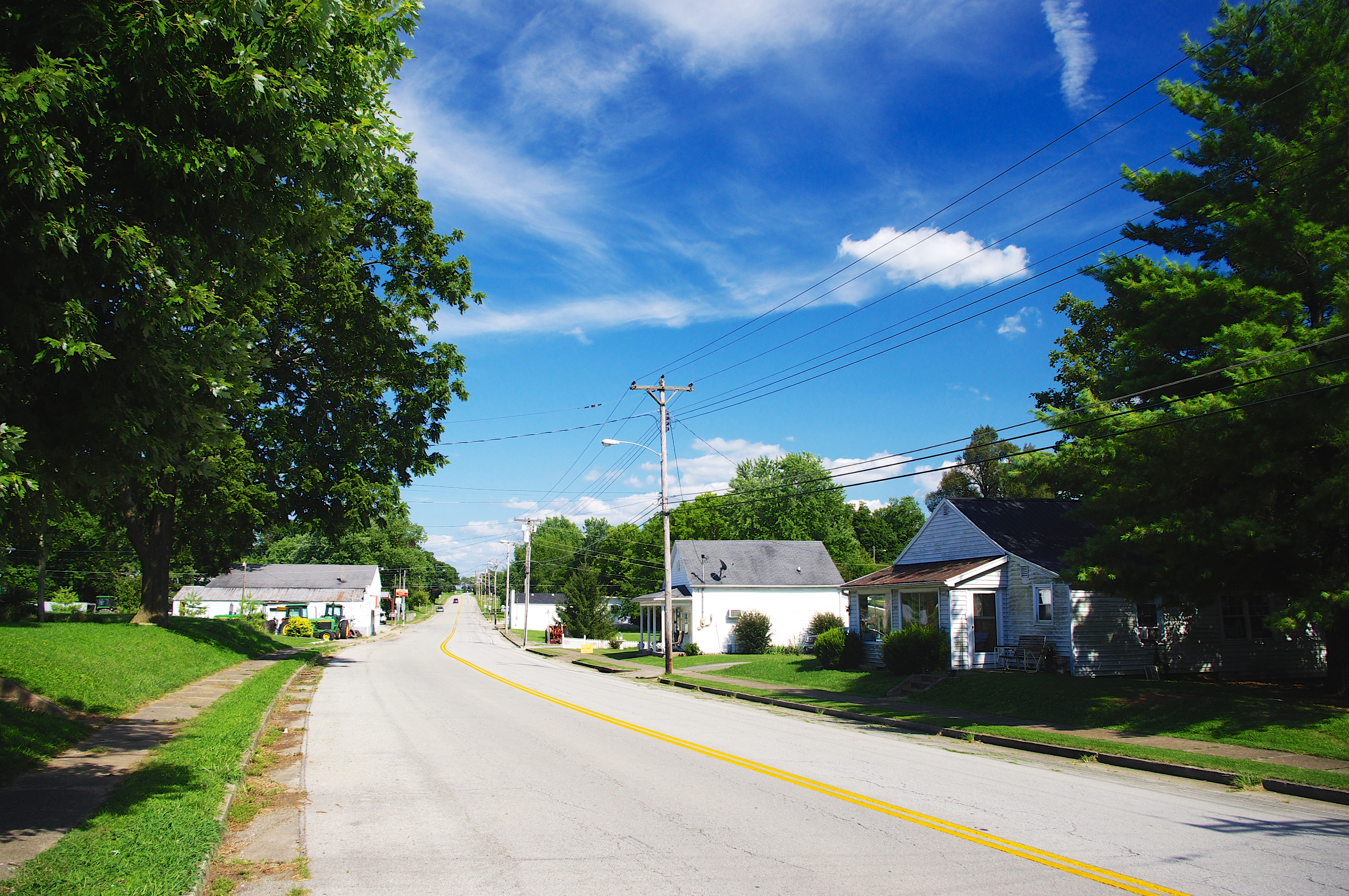
- Main Street (KY 48) in Fairfield

- Location of Fairfield in Nelson County, Kentucky.
- Coordinates: 37°55′55″N 85°23′02″W
- Country: United States
- State: Kentucky
- County: Nelson

Area
  - Total: 0.29 sq mi (0.76 km^{2})
  - Land: 0.29 sq mi (0.74 km^{2})
  - Water: 0.0077 sq mi (0.02 km^{2})
- Elevation: 735 ft (224 m)

Population (2020)
  - Total: 118
  - Density: 413.0/sq mi (159.46/km^{2})
- Time zone: UTC-5 (Eastern (EST))
  - Summer (DST): UTC-4 (EDT)
- ZIP code: 40020
- Area code: 502
- FIPS code: 21-26020
- GNIS feature ID: 2403588

Fairfield is a home rule-class city in Nelson County, Kentucky, in the United States. As of the 2020 census, Fairfield had a population of 118.

== History ==
Originally known as Turkey Town, Fairfield was established by the state assembly in 1818 and incorporated as a city in 1870.

== Geography ==
Fairfield is approximately five miles northwest of Bloomfield, northeast of Bardstown, and about 35 miles (56 km) southeast of Louisville. Roads entering Fairfield include Kentucky Route 48 (Main Street), Kentucky Route 652 (Little Union Road), Murrays Run Road and Wilkerson Road. Kentucky State Route 509 meets 48 a half-mile west of town. It lies in the upper drainage of East Fork Cox Creek, a tributary of the Salt River.

According to the United States Census Bureau, the city has a total area of 0.29 square miles (0.75 km^{2}).

== Demographics ==
Historical population
Census	Pop.	Note	%±
1870	167		—
1900	206		—
1910	292		41.7%
1920	329		12.7%
1930	148		−55.0%
1950	202		—
1960	290		43.6%
1970	163		−43.8%
1980	169		3.7%
1990	142		−16.0%
2000	72		−49.3%
2010	113		56.9%
2020	118		4.4%
U.S. Decennial Census

As of the 2000 census, there were 72 people, 27 households, and 23 families residing in the city. The population density was 248.3 inhabitants per square mile (95.9/km^{2}). There were 32 housing units at an average density of 110.3 per square mile (42.6/km^{2}). The racial makeup of the city was 88.89% White and 11.11% African American.

There were 27 households, out of which 40.7% had children under the age of 18 living with them, 59.3% were married couples living together, 25.9% had a female householder with no husband present, and 14.8% were non-families. 14.8% of all households were made up of individuals, and 7.4% had someone living alone who was 65 years of age or older. The average household size was 2.63 and the average family size was 2.83.

In the city the population was spread out, with 25.0% under the age of 18, 8.3% from 18 to 24, 31.9% from 25 to 44, 20.8% from 45 to 64, and 13.9% who were 65 years of age or older. The median age was 40 years. For every 100 females, there were 89.5 males. For every 100 females age 18 and over, there were 86.2 males.

The median income for a household in the city was $19,375, and the median income for a family was $26,250. Males had a median income of $58,750 versus $0 for females. The per capita income for the city was $17,181. None of the population and none of the families were below the poverty line.
