= Bloomfield, Kentucky =

City of Bloomfield
- City
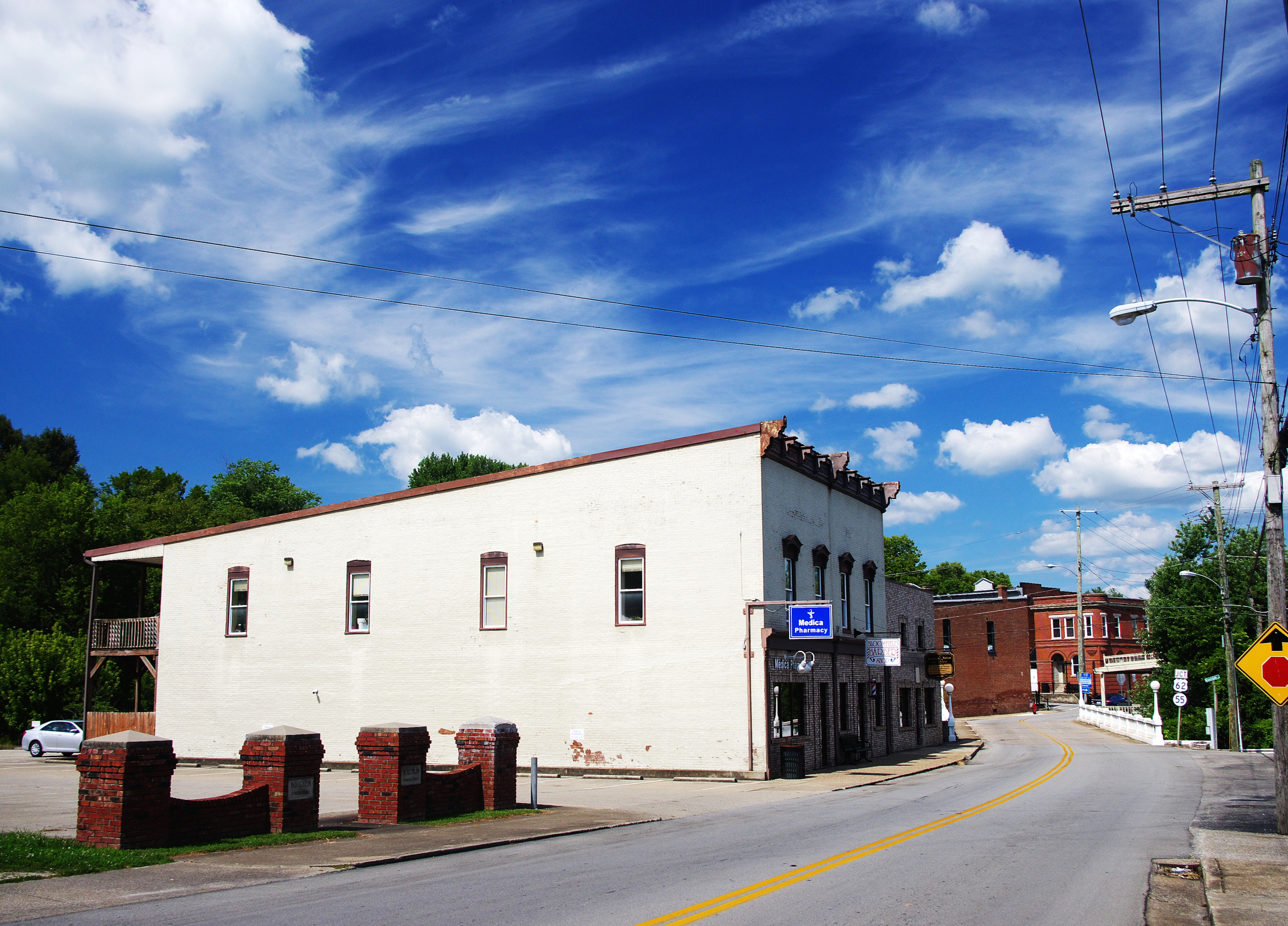
- KY 48 in Bloomfield

- Flag

- Location of Bloomfield in Nelson County, Kentucky.
- Coordinates: 37°54′44″N 85°18′50″W
- Country: United States
- State: Kentucky
- County: Nelson
- Incorporated: 1819
- Named for: the family of a local landowner

Area
  - Total: 1.46 sq mi (3.79 km^{2})
  - Land: 1.44 sq mi (3.73 km^{2})
  - Water: 0.023 sq mi (0.06 km^{2})
- Elevation: 673 ft (205 m)

Population (2020)
  - Total: 961
  - Density: 666.8/sq mi (257.45/km^{2})
- Time zone: UTC-5 (Eastern (EST))
  - Summer (DST): UTC-4 (EDT)
- ZIP code: 40008
- Area code: 502
- FIPS code: 21-07516
- GNIS feature ID: 2403879
- Website: bloomfield.ky.gov

Bloomfield is a home rule–class city in Nelson County, Kentucky, in the United States. As of the 2020 census, Bloomfield had a population of 961. Former names of the city included Middlesburg and Gandertown.

== History ==
The community on the east fork of Simpson Creek originally grew up on sites purchased from Leven Powell's 2,000-acre (810 ha) land grant, which he received from the state of Virginia in 1779 and surveyed in 1781. The community on the east bank of the creek was known as Middlesburg when its first post office opened in 1803; the west bank was known as Gandertown from its sport of "ganderpulling". Dr. John Bemiss of Rochester, New York, had settled in the area in 1799; in 1817, he laid out the town and renamed it Bloomfield, supposedly after his wife's maiden name (Bloomer) and his daughter's married name (Merrifield). The post office adopted this name the next year, but, according to the state's Land Office, the town was still formally incorporated under the name Middlesburg in 1819.

Bloomfield's economy has always been agriculturally based, but there was a flour mill and a tobacco auction house in the 19th century. The Newell B. McClaskey House and plantation was built in 1835, and is now listed on the National Register of Historic Places. The McClaskey family had owned over 700 acres of land in the area at one time.

The public library was established in 1916 by the local Woman's Club.

== Geography ==
Bloomfield is located on the East Fork of Simpson Creek (part of the Salt River watershed). It is concentrated around the intersection of US 62, KY 55 and KY 48, 9 miles (14 km) northeast of Bardstown, and about 20 miles (32 km) southeast of Louisville. According to the United States Census Bureau, the city has a total area of 1.3 square miles (3.4 km^{2}), of which 1.3 square miles (3.4 km^{2}) is land and 0.78% is water.

== Demographics ==
Historical population
Census	Pop.	Note	%±
1810	68		—
1830	301		—
1870	435		—
1900	385		—
1910	352		−8.6%
1920	471		33.8%
1930	455		−3.4%
1940	535		17.6%
1950	666		24.5%
1960	916		37.5%
1970	1,072		17.0%
1980	954		−11.0%
1990	845		−11.4%
2000	855		1.2%
2010	838		−2.0%
2020	961		14.7%
U.S. Decennial Census

As of the census of 2020, there were 961 people, 460 households, and 272 families residing in the city. The population density was 755 inhabitants per square mile (292/km^{2}). There were 384 housing units at an average density of 291.8 per square mile (112.7/km^{2}). The racial makeup of the city was 89.3% White (88.1% non-Hispanic), 8.6% African American, 0.48% Asian, 0.72% from other races, and 0.95% from two or more races. Hispanics or Latinos of any race were 2.0% of the population. No one in the city identified exclusively as a Native American or Pacific Islander.

There were 334 households, out of which 35.3% had children under the age of 18 living with them, 48.8% were married couples living together, 14.4% had a female householder with no husband present, 5.7% had a male householder with no wife present, and 31.1% were non-families. 28.1% of all households were made up of individuals, and 12.3% had someone living alone who was 65 years of age or older. The average household size was 2.51 and the average family size was 3.04.

The age distribution was 27.2% under 18, 6.8% from 18 to 24, 22.8% from 25 to 44, 26.6% from 45 to 64, and 16.6% who were 65 or older. The median age was 38.5 years. For every 100 females, there were 97.6 males. For every 100 females age 18 and over, there were 84.8 males.

The median income for a household in the city was $50,938, and the median income for a family was $51,528. Full-time male workers had a median income of $46,944 versus $26,510 for females. The per capita income for the city was $20,279. About 18.1% of families and 18.9% of the population were below the poverty line, including 34.7% of those under age 18 and 10.2% of those age 65 or over.

== Education ==
There are two public schools, Bloomfield Elementary School and Bloomfield Middle School; there are two schools now closed: the former Bloomfield High School and Eli H Brown Elementary school, both now privately owned. Eli Brown was a black-only school during segregation.

Bloomfield has a lending library, a branch of the Nelson County Public Library.

The Library features several public computers, a kids program with multiple activities for teens and children, and lots of decor, furniture, and books. There are computers for teens and adults as well as computers for toddlers with games, and tablets with games.

== Notable residents ==
- Jereboam Beauchamp criminal who inspired Politian by Edgar Allan Poe.
- Jerry Bruckheimer (born 1943) and Linda Bruckheimer; film and television producer who own several historic buildings downtown.
- James Guthrie (1792–1869), businessman, Kentucky State Representative, Secretary of the Treasury, senator, and president of the L&N Railroad
- Harvey C. Russell Sr. (1883–1949) educator, and academic administrator
- Stith Thompson (1885–1976), folklore scholar

== See also ==
- National Register of Historic Places listings in Nelson County, Kentucky
