= Taylorsville, Kentucky =

- City
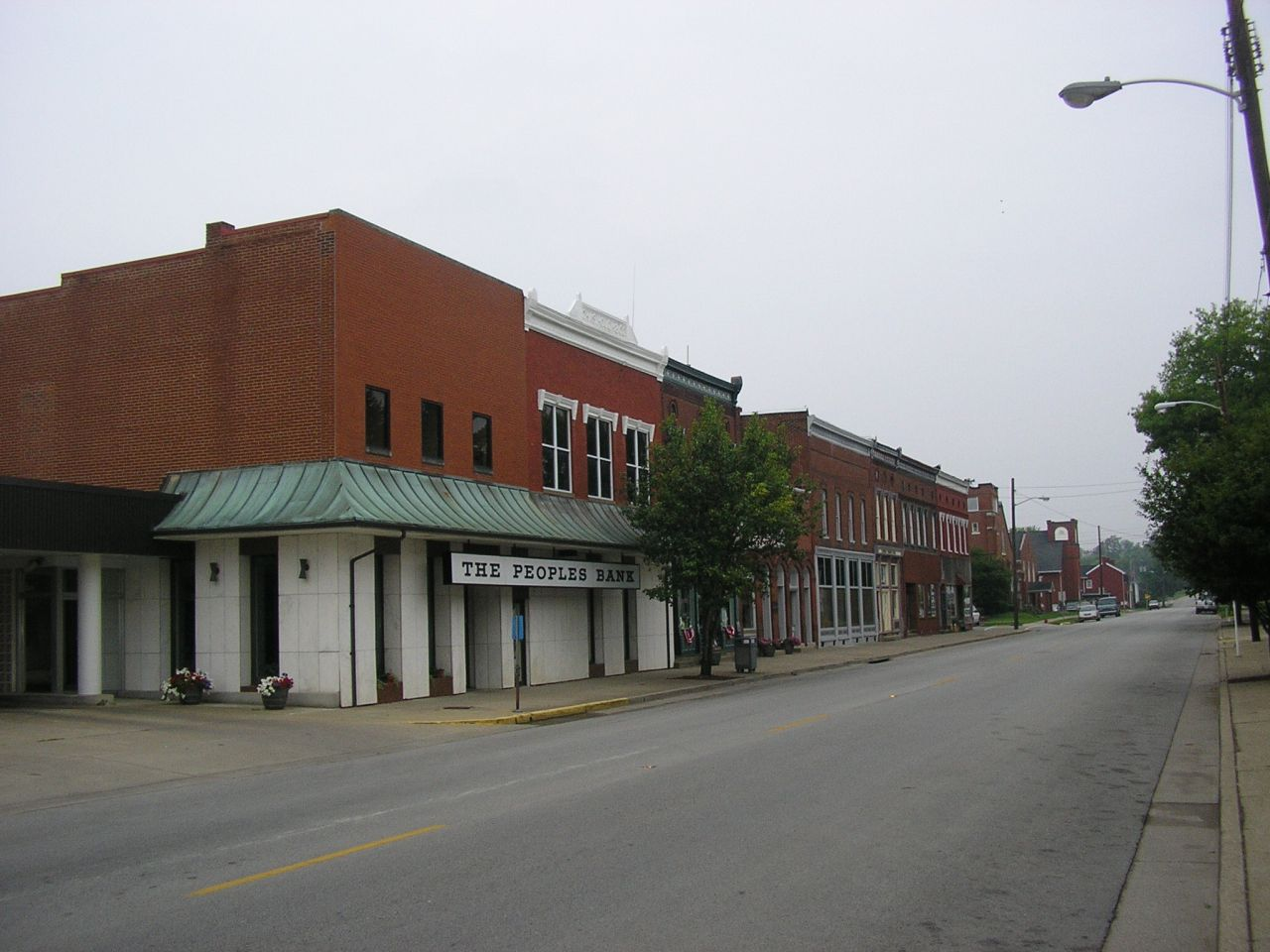
- Downtown Taylorsville

- Location of Taylorsville in Spencer County, Kentucky.
- Coordinates: 38°02′23″N 85°19′20″W
- Country: United States
- State: Kentucky
- County: Spencer

Government
  - Mayor: Karen Spencer

Area
  - Total: 0.91 sq mi (2.36 km^{2})
  - Land: 0.91 sq mi (2.36 km^{2})
  - Water: 0 sq mi (0.00 km^{2})
- Elevation: 719 ft (219 m)

Population (2020)
  - Total: 1,256
  - Density: 1,381.2/sq mi (533.27/km^{2})
- Time zone: UTC-5 (Eastern (EST))
  - Summer (DST): UTC-4 (EDT)
- ZIP code: 40071
- Area code: 502
- FIPS code: 21-75810
- GNIS feature ID: 2405574
- Website: www.cityoftaylorsville.com

Taylorsville is a home rule-class city in Spencer County, Kentucky, United States. It is the county seat of Spencer County. As of the 2020 census, the city had a total population of 1,256. It was incorporated in 1829.

== History ==
Taylorsville was founded in 1799 on the land of Richard Taylor, father of US President Zachary Taylor. Roughly 60 acres (240,000 m^{2}) of land was taken by the Shelby County Court on Taylor's motion, and soon the town was named after Taylor himself. In 1814 the town of Taylorsville was admitted to record by the Shelby County Court. Spencer County was created in 1824.

William Quantrill, the famous Confederate guerrilla raider, was killed by Union troops near the town in 1865, just before the end of the American Civil War.

== Geography ==
According to the United States Census Bureau, the city has a total area of 0.7 square mile (1.9 km^{2}), all land.

== Demographics ==
Historical population
Census	Pop.	Note	%±
1830	290		—
1840	398		37.2%
1880	537		—
1890	619		15.3%
1900	615		−0.6%
1910	622		1.1%
1920	673		8.2%
1930	729		8.3%
1940	921		26.3%
1950	888		−3.6%
1960	937		5.5%
1970	897		−4.3%
1980	801		−10.7%
1990	774		−3.4%
2000	1,009		30.4%
2010	763		−24.4%
2020	1,256		64.6%
U.S. Decennial Census

As of the census of 2000, there were 1,009 people, 427 households, and 234 families residing in the city. The population density was 1,383.4 inhabitants per square mile (534.1/km^{2}). There were 479 housing units at an average density of 656.7 per square mile (253.6/km^{2}). The racial makeup of the city was 90.09% White, 7.83% African American, 0.40% from other races, and 1.68% from two or more races. Hispanic or Latino of any race were 1.78% of the population.

There were 427 households, out of which 28.1% had children under the age of 18 living with them, 34.2% were married couples living together, 18.7% had a female householder with no husband present, and 45.0% were non-families. 40.7% of all households were made up of individuals, and 17.6% had someone living alone who was 65 years of age or older. The average household size was 2.10 and the average family size was 2.83.

In the city, the population was spread out, with 21.5% under the age of 18, 9.9% from 18 to 24, 25.2% from 25 to 44, 19.7% from 45 to 64, and 23.7% who were 65 years of age or older. The median age was 41 years. For every 100 females, there were 72.5 males. For every 100 females age 18 and over, there were 67.1 males.

The median income for a household in the city was $19,271, and the median income for a family was $30,000. Males had a median income of $24,643 versus $22,321 for females. The per capita income for the city was $12,451. About 27.3% of families and 30.8% of the population were below the poverty line, including 42.7% of those under age 18 and 24.4% of those age 65 or over.

== Notable people ==
- Jack Bellman, Major League Baseball catcher for the St. Louis Browns; born in Taylorsville.
- Cliff Carlisle, an early western and blues singer, known for his yodeling and Hawaiian steel guitar; born in Taylorsville.
- George G. Gilbert, U.S. Representative; born in Taylorsville.
- Ralph Waldo Emerson Gilbert, U.S. Representative; born in Taylorsville.
- Shannon Lawson, American country music artist and songwriter

== Education ==
Taylorsville has a lending library, the Spencer County Public Library.

== Climate ==
The climate in this area is characterized by hot, humid summers and generally mild to cool winters. According to the Köppen Climate Classification system, Taylorsville has a humid subtropical climate, abbreviated "Cfa" on climate maps.
