= Film industry and video game industry =

Historical relationship between industries

The film industry and video game industry have a long and detailed common history – the two industries have collaborated many times since the 1980s. This includes collaboration between people from both industries and projects resulting in products such as video games, film adaptations of video games, among other things.

== History ==
=== 1980s ===
Video games have also been adapted into films, beginning in the early 1980s. Films closely related to the video game industries were done in this time, such as Tron and Cloak & Dagger, but only after the release of several films based on well-known brands has this genre become recognized in its own right.

=== 1990s ===
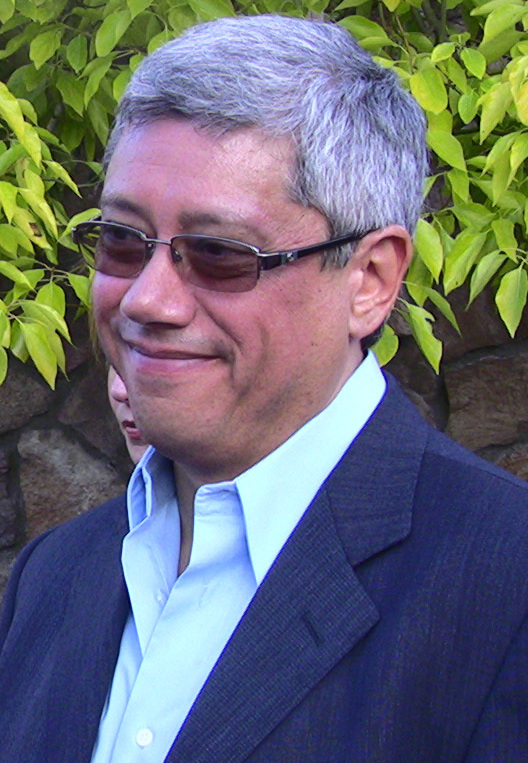
Devlin

The 10th Planet which was scheduled to be released in October 1997 was canceled. The game was a collaboration between Bethesda Softworks and Centropolis Entertainment (film production company founded by Roland Emmerich and Dean Devlin). Christopher Weaver, the founder of Bethesda was introduced to Devlin and Emmerich through mutual friends.

In 1993, Super Mario Bros. was released, a film loosely based on the Mario video game series by Nintendo. The film was poorly received by critics.

Steven Spielberg proposed the concept for the first Medal of Honor video game in the spring of 1997.

=== 2000s ===

In 2000, Lionsgate CEO and Vice Chairman at the time Jon Feltheimer as well as Dean Devlin joined ZeniMax Media as company advisors. Also that year, Sam Simon joined ZeniMax as President of e-Nexus Studios.

In 2002, Vin Diesel formed his own development studio, Tigon Studios.

In October 2005, Steven Spielberg and Electronic Arts partnered to develop 3 video games.

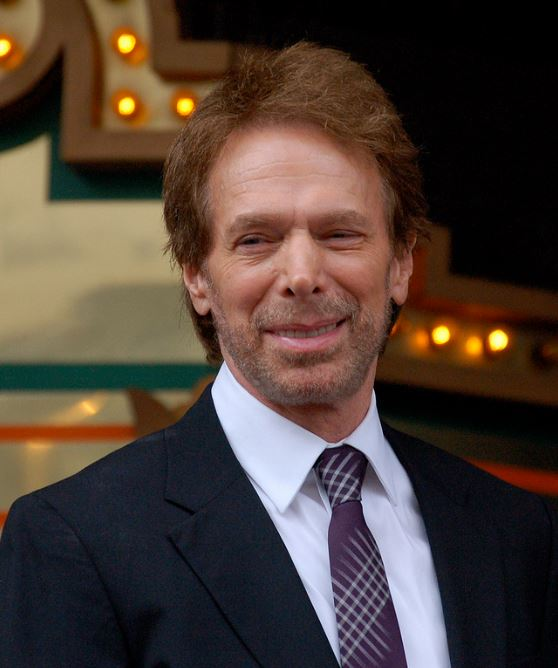
Jerry Bruckheimer

In December 2007, Jerry Bruckheimer announced plans to partner with MTV to create a new game studio. Bruckheimer previously joined ZeniMax's board of directors the same year and has since showed up at several launch parties for Bethesda Softworks titles including Fallout 3, Fallout: New Vegas, and The Elder Scrolls V: Skyrim.

In 2009, Bruckheimer unveiled Jerry Bruckheimer Games headed by former Microsoft Studios Publishing Executive Producer Jim Veevaert as president of production and Jay Cohen, previously Ubisoft's vice president of U.S. publishing, as president of development.

=== 2010s ===
In 2011 it was rumored that Jerry Bruckheimer Games was working on three titles, but nothing came out of it ever since. In March 2013 Jerry Bruckheimer Games was closed. Although Jerry Bruckheimer Games is closed, Bruckheimer still remained a ZeniMax board member, mostly due to being a close associate of former ZeniMax President Ernest Del until Microsoft bought ZeniMax in 2021.

In February 2015, Lionsgate made a significant investment in Telltale Games. As part of the deal, Feltheimer joined Telltale's board of directors.

=== 2020s ===

In July 2020, a Fallout TV series was announced as in development by Amazon, based on the video game series of the same name. The series is created by Lisa Joy and Jonathan Nolan for Amazon Prime Video. The duo will also be writing and executive producing the series with their production company, Kilter Films, working alongside Bethesda Softworks and Bethesda Game Studios. Alongside Joy and Nolan, Kilter Films' Athena Wickham, Bethesda Softworks' James Altman, and Bethesda Game Studios' Todd Howard will also be executive producing the series.

A movie based on the Uncharted video game series was released in February 2022 while a second Mario movie was released in April 2023. In addition, Universal and Blumhouse Productions released a film adaptation of Five Nights at Freddy's in October 2023.

== See also ==
- List of video games
- Video game industry
- Film adaptation
