= Dana Wynter =

German-born English actress (1931–2011)

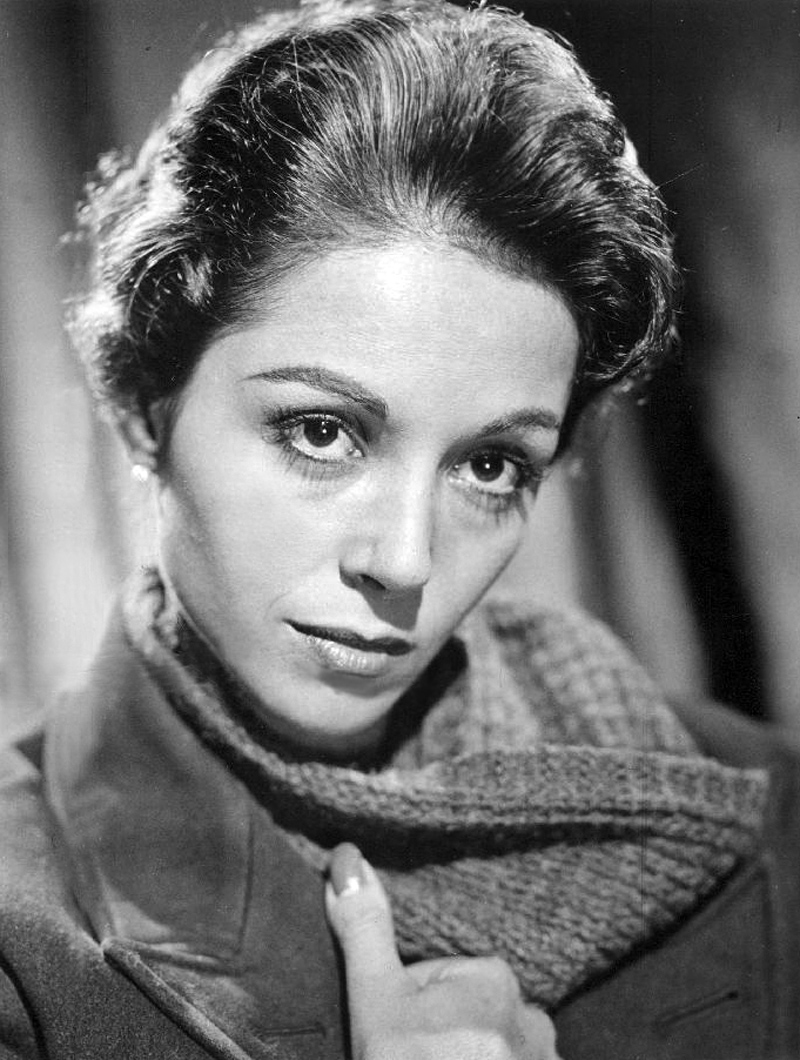
- Wynter in 1962
- Born: Dagmar Winter; 8 June 1931; Berlin, Germany
- Died: 5 May 2011 (aged 79); Ojai, California, US
- Occupation: Actress
- Years active: 1951–1993
- Spouse: Greg Bautzer (m. 1956; div. 1981)
- Children: 1

Dana Wynter (born Dagmar Winter; 8 June 1931 – 5 May 2011) was a German-born British actress who was raised in the United Kingdom and southern Africa. She appeared in film and television for more than 40 years, beginning in the 1950s. One of her best-known film performances was in Invasion of the Body Snatchers (1956). A tall, dark, elegant beauty, she played both victim and villain. Her characters both in film and on television sometimes faced horrific dangers, which they often did not survive, but she also played scheming, manipulative women on television mysteries and crime procedural dramas.

== Early life ==
Dana Wynter was born Dagmar Winter in 1931 Berlin, Germany, the daughter of Dr. Peter Winter, a British surgeon of German descent, and his wife Jutta Oarda, a native of Hungary.

She grew up in Britain. When she was 16, her father visited friends in Southern Rhodesia (Zimbabwe today), fell in love with the country, and brought his daughter and her stepmother to live with him there.

Dana Wynter (as she called herself) later enrolled at South Africa's Rhodes University in 1949. She studied medicine while also pursuing theatre, playing the blind girl in a school production of Through a Glass Darkly, a role in which she said she had been "terrible". After a year of studies, she returned to Britain and turned to acting.

== Career ==
=== British films ===
Wynter began her cinema career at age 20 in 1951, playing small roles, often uncredited, in British films. One such was Lady Godiva Rides Again (1951) in which other future leading ladies, Kay Kendall, Diana Dors, and Joan Collins, played similarly small roles. She was appearing in the play Hammersmith when an American agent told her he wanted to represent her. She was again uncredited when she played Morgan Le Fay's servant in the MGM film Knights of the Round Table (1953).

Wynter left for New York on 5 November 1953, Guy Fawkes Day (which commemorates a failed attempt in 1605 to blow up the English Parliament). "There were all sorts of fireworks going off," she later told an interviewer, "and I couldn't help thinking it was a fitting send-off for my departure to the New World."

=== New York ===
Wynter had more success in New York than in London. She appeared on the stage and on TV, where she had leading roles in Robert Montgomery Presents (1953), Suspense (1954), Studio One (1955), a 1963 episode of The Virginian ("If You Have Tears"), and a 1965 episode of The Alfred Hitchcock Hour ("An Unlocked Window"), which won an Edgar Award.

=== 20th Century Fox ===
She moved to Hollywood, where in 1955 she was placed under contract by 20th Century Fox. In that same year, she won the Golden Globe award for Most Promising Newcomer, a title she shared with Anita Ekberg and Victoria Shaw. She graduated to playing major roles in major films. She co-starred with Kevin McCarthy, Larry Gates, and Carolyn Jones, playing Becky Driscoll in the original film version of Invasion of the Body Snatchers (1956).

She starred opposite Robert Taylor in D-Day the Sixth of June (1956), alongside Rock Hudson and Sidney Poitier in Something of Value (1957), Mel Ferrer in Fräulein (1958), Robert Wagner in In Love and War (1958), James Cagney and Don Murray in Shake Hands with the Devil (1959), and the last of her 20th Century Fox contract roles opposite Kenneth More in Sink the Bismarck! (1960).

=== 1960s ===
She then starred opposite Danny Kaye in On the Double (1961), and George C. Scott in The List of Adrian Messenger (1963).

In shooting two films in Ireland, she made a second home there with her husband, Hollywood divorce lawyer Greg Bautzer. Over the following two decades, she guest-starred in dozens of television series, including the title character in several Wagon Train episodes, such as "The Barbara Lindquist Story", and in occasional roles in films such as Airport (1970). She appeared as various British women in the ABC television series Twelve O'Clock High (1964–66).

In 1966–67, she co-starred with Robert Lansing (who had been the original star of Twelve O'Clock High) on The Man Who Never Was, but the series lasted only one season. She guest-starred in 1968 in The Invaders in the episode "The Captive", and in 1969, on the second version of The Donald O'Connor Show. On Get Smart, The Rockford Files, and Hart to Hart, she played beautiful, upper-class schemers and villains. She also was on an episode of The Love Boat, "Sounds of Silence".

=== Later career ===
She appeared in the Irish soap opera, Bracken (1978–80). In 1993, she returned to television to play Raymond Burr's wife in The Return of Ironside.

== Personal life ==
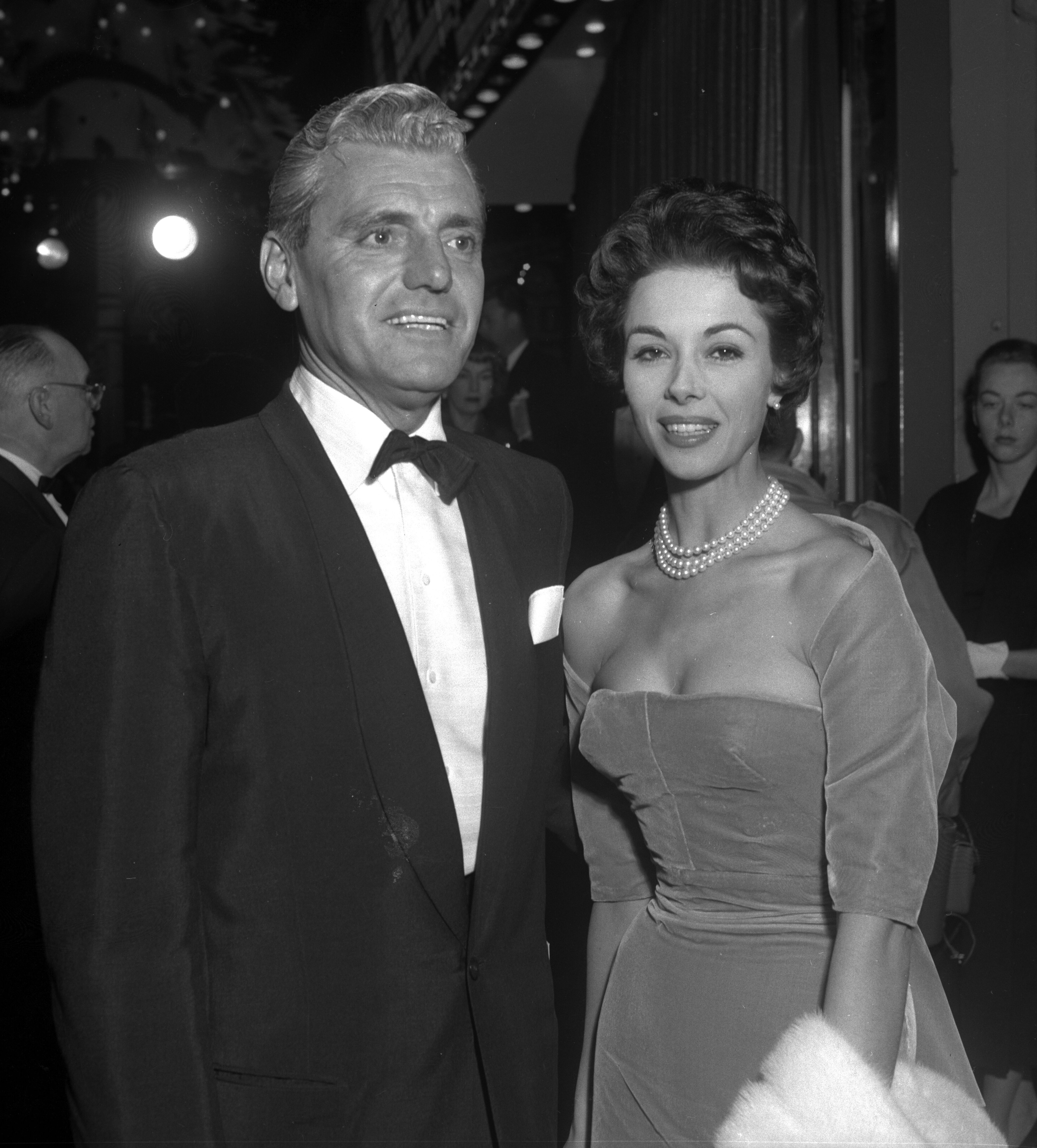
Dana Wynter with husband Greg Bautzer (1957)

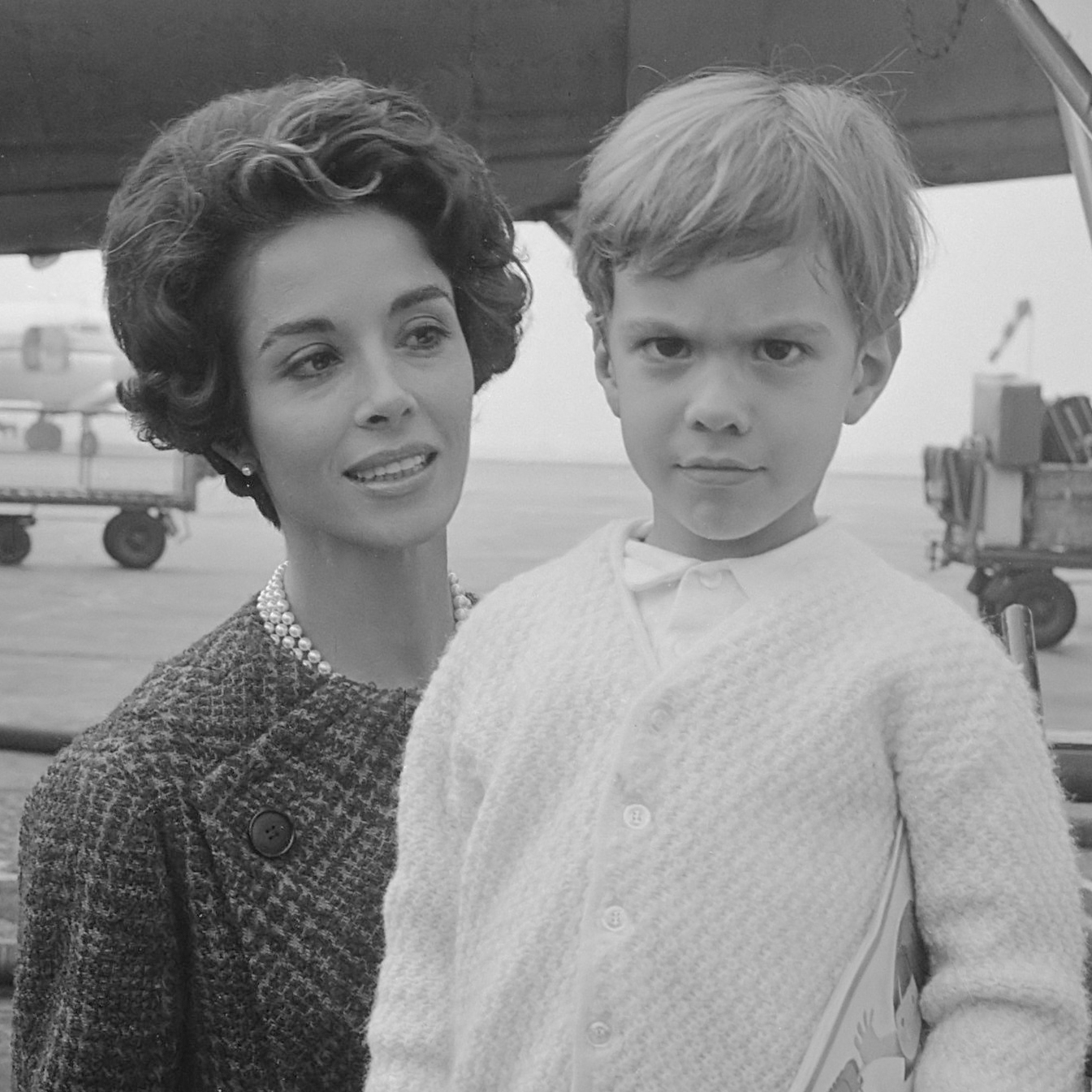
Dana Wynter with her son Mark (1963)

In 1956, Wynter married celebrity divorce lawyer Greg Bautzer; they divorced in 1981. They had one child, Mark Ragan Bautzer, born on 29 January 1960. Wynter, once referred to as Hollywood's "oasis of elegance", divided her time between her homes in California and Glendalough, County Wicklow, Ireland. She also had an apartment in Royal Hibernian Way in Dublin. An anti-apartheid advocate, she refused to open a performance centre in South Africa because she discovered that black and white children would have to attend on alternate days.

In the late 1980s, Wynter authored the column "Grassroots" for The Guardian newspaper in London. Writing in both Ireland and California, her works concentrated mainly on life in both locations leading her to use the titles Irish Eyes and California Eyes for a number of her publications.

In July 2008, Wynter was involved in a legal dispute over the proceeds of the sale of a €125,000 Paul Henry painting, Evening on Achill Sound. The painting, which hung in the family home in County Wicklow, was said to have been bought for her in 1996 by her son as a gift. The dispute was resolved in the High Court in 2009.

== Death ==
Wynter died on 5 May 2011 from congestive heart failure at the Ojai Valley Community Hospital's Continuing Care Center; she was 79 years old. She had suffered from heart disease in her later years, and was transferred from the hospital's intensive care unit earlier in the day. Her son Mark said she was not expected to survive, and "she stepped off the bus very peacefully."

== Filmography ==
Year	Title	Role	Notes
1951	Night Without Stars	Casino Patron	Film debut, Uncredited
1951	White Corridors	Marjorie Brewster	
1951	Lady Godiva Rides Again	Myrtle Shaw	
1952	The Woman's Angle	Elaine	Credited as Dagmar Wynter
1952	The Crimson Pirate	Baron Gruda's travelling companion	Credited as Dagmar Wynter
1952	It Started in Paradise	Barbara, the model	Credited as Dagmar Wynter
1953	Knights of the Round Table	Morgan Le Fay's Servant	Uncredited
1955	The 20th Century-Fox Hour	Laura Hunt	Episode: "A Portrait of Murder"
1955	The View from Pompey's Head	Dinah Blackford Higgins	
1956	Invasion of the Body Snatchers	Becky Driscoll	
1956	Colonel March of Scotland Yard	Francine Rapport	Season 1, Episode 24 "Death in the Dressing Room" - credited as Dagmar Wynter
1956	D-Day the Sixth of June	Valerie Russell	
1957	Something of Value	Peter's Betrothed – Holly	
1958	Fräulein	Erika Angermann	
1958	In Love and War	Sue Trumbell	
1959	Shake Hands with the Devil	Jennifer Curtis	
1960	Sink the Bismarck!	Second Officer Anne Davis	
1961	On the Double	Lady Margaret MacKenzie-Smith	
1961	Wagon Train	Lizabeth Ann Calhoun	Episode: "The Lizabeth Ann Calhoun Story"
1962	The Dick Powell Show	Barbara Bellamore	Episode: "The Great Anatole"
1962	Wagon Train	Lisa Raincloud/Writer	Episode: "The Lisa Raincloud Story"
1963	The Virginian	Leona Kelland	Episode: "If You Have Tears"
1964	Wagon Train	Barbara Lindquist	Season 8 Episode 5 "The Barbara Lindquist Story"
1964	The List of Adrian Messenger	Lady Jocelyn Bruttenholm	
1964	Twelve O'Clock High	Ann Mcrae	Episode: "Interlude"
1965	Twelve O'Clock High	Lady Catherine Hammet	Episode: "The Cry of Fallen Birds"
1965	The Alfred Hitchcock Hour	Nurse Stella	Season 3 Episode 17: "An Unlocked Window"
1965	The Wild Wild West	Lady Beatrice Marquand-Gaynesford	Episode: "23 – The Night of the Two-Legged Buffalo"
1966	My Three Sons	Maggie	Episode: "From Maggie with Love "
1966–1967	The Man Who Never Was	Eva Wainwright	18 episodes
1967	Dundee and the Culhane	Martha	1 episode, "The Widow's Weeds Brief"
1967	Gunsmoke	Isabel Townsend	Episode 12 "Death Train" (27 November 1967)
1968	The Invaders	Dr. Katherina Serret	1 episode, "The Captive"
1968	If He Hollers, Let Him Go!	Ellen Whitlock	
1968	Companions in Nightmare	Julie Klanton	Television film
1969	Get Smart	Ann Cameron	Episode: " Widow Often Annie"
1969	It Takes a Thief	The Contessa del Mundo	Episode: " Guess Who's Coming to Rio"
1970	Airport	Cindy Bakersfeld	
1970	Triangle	Olive Millikan	
1971	Marcus Welby, M.D.	Julie Croft	Episode: "False Spring"
1972	Hawaii Five-O	Claudine	Episode: "The Ninety Second War: Part One"
1973	Santee	Valerie	
1973	Cannon	Dr. Deedra Pace	Episode "Catch Me If You Can"
1974	McMillan and Wife	Elena	Episode: "The Man Without a Face"
1974	Cannon	Jackie Akers	Episode "Triangle of Terror"
1975	Le Sauvage	Jessie Coutances	
1975	The Lives of Jenny Dolan	Andrea Hardesty	Television film
1975	Cannon	Mrs Hobart	Episode "Search and Destroy"
1978–1982	Bracken	Jill Daly	5 episodes
1979	Backstairs at the White House	Mrs. Colgate	Miniseries
1979	Fantasy Island	Mrs. Norma Rawlings	Episode: "Goose for the Gander/The Stuntman"
1979	The Love Boat	Lillian Smith	Episode: "Murder on the High Seas/Sounds of Silence/Cyrano de Bricker"
1979	The Rockford Files	Princess Irene Rachevsky	2-part episode: "Lions, Tigers, Monkeys and Dogs"
1981	The Love Boat	Margo Beacham	Season 4 Episode 16: "Gopher's Bride/Love with a Married Man/Not Tonight, Jack!"
1981	Hart to Hart	Silvia Van Upton	Episode: "Ex-wives Can Be Murder"
1981	Magnum, PI	Olivia Ross	Episode: "Double Jeopardy"
1982	The Royal Romance of Charles and Diana	Queen Elizabeth II	Television film
1982	Magnum, PI	Velma Troubshaw	Episode: "Foiled Again"
1993	The Return of Ironside	Katherine Ironside	Television film; Wynter's final film

== Awards ==
Year	Award	Notes
1956	Golden Globes – New Star of the Year -Actress	Won with Anita Ekberg and Victoria Shaw

== Bibliography ==
- Dana Wynter, Other People Other Places: Memories of Four Continents, Caladrius Press Dublin, 2005, ISBN 978-1-599-75242-6
