= Linda Bruckheimer =

American novelist

- Born: Linda Sue Cobb; Texas, U.S.
- Occupations: Editor; novelist; philanthropist
- Spouse: Jerry Bruckheimer

Linda Sue Bruckheimer (née Cobb) is an American editor, novelist, and philanthropist. She is the author of two best-selling novels. She has restored many buildings in Bloomfield, Kentucky.

== Early life ==
Bruckheimer was born in Texas and grew up in Louisville, Kentucky. She moved to California with her family as a teenager.

== Career ==
Bruckheimer worked as the West Coast editor of Mirabella from 1989 to 1995. She then worked as a writer and producer for animations for PBS.

Bruckheimer has written two best-selling semi-autobiographical novels about the American South. Her first novel, Dreaming Southern, published in 1999, talks about a family who leaves Kentucky to go West. Her second novel, The Southern Belles of Honeysuckle Way, published in 2005, is about the family's return to Kentucky to celebrate a matriarch's seventy-fifth birthday.

== Philanthropy ==
Bruckheimer has served on the board of trustees of the National Trust for Historic Preservation. She has restored many buildings in Bloomfield, Kentucky. In 1998, she and her husband were grand marshals of the Bloomfield Tobacco Festival parade.

Bruckheimer co-curated a fundraising gala for the Los Angeles Conservancy, a historic preservation organization, at the Beverly Hills estate of Liliore Green, Burton E. Green's daughter, on October 22, 2016.

== Personal life ==
Bruckheimer is married to Jerry Bruckheimer, a television and film producer. They reside in Los Angeles, California.

== Bibliography ==
- Dreaming Southern (Penguin, 1999)
- The Southern Belles of Honeysuckle Way (Penguin, 2005)
