= Monroe Owsley =

American actor (1900-1937)

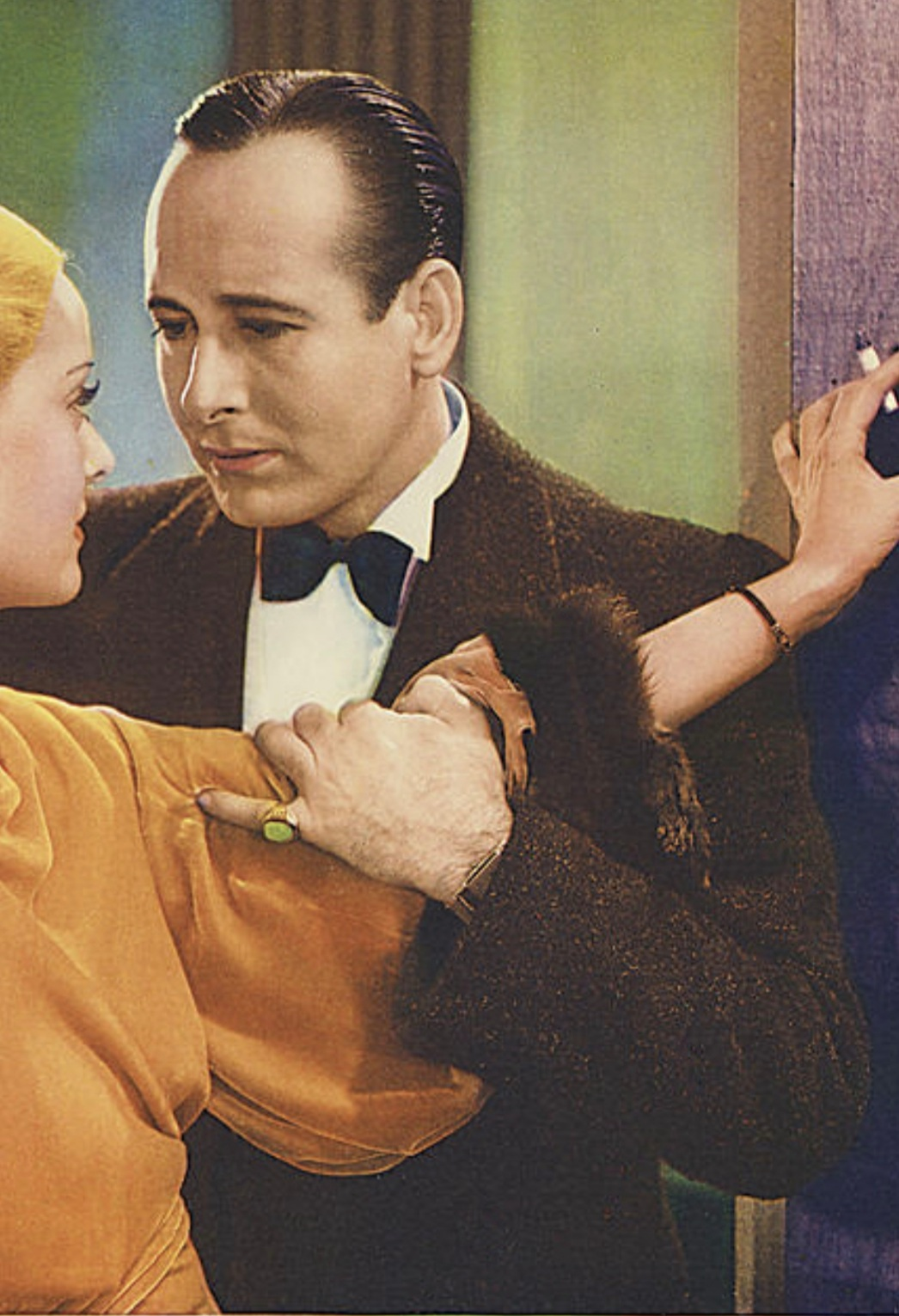
- Owsley in Ex-Lady (1933)
- Born: Monroe Righter Owsley; August 11, 1900; Atlanta, Georgia, U.S.
- Died: June 7, 1937 (aged 36); Belmont, California, U.S.
- Occupation: Actor
- Years active: 1924–1937

Monroe Righter Owsley (August 11, 1900 – June 7, 1937) was an American stage and film actor.

== Early life ==
The son of Mr. and Mrs. Henry Owsley, he was born in Atlanta, Georgia. His father was a manufacturing executive, and his mother was a concert singer. Owsley was educated at Loomis Institute in Windsor, Connecticut; Bristol High School in Bristol, Connecticut; and Philadelphia High School. He started taking acting classes when he was a teenager.

Before Owsley became an actor, he worked as a reporter and a drama critic for the Public Ledger newspaper in Philadelphia, Pennsylvania.

== Career ==
Owsley gained acting experience with stock theater troupes in Chicago, Cincinnati, and Dayton, and in a road company that presented The Meanest Man in the World playing one-night stands in tents. He made his Broadway debut in Young Blood (1925). His film debut was 1928's The First Kiss, starring Fay Wray. This was followed by the Philip Barry film Holiday in 1930, in the role played by Lew Ayres in the 1938 version. Soon after, he was cast opposite actresses such as Clara Bow, Claudette Colbert, Bette Davis, Barbara Stanwyck, Joan Crawford, Gloria Swanson, Mae West, and Kay Francis.

== Death ==
On June 7, 1937, Owsley died from a heart attack "on the way from Los Angeles to San Francisco" in Belmont, California. He was 36 years old.

Actress Jean Harlow died on the same date.

== Filmography ==
Year	Title	Role	Notes
1928	The First Kiss	the Other Suitor	Lost film
1928	Carry on, Sergeant!	Leonard Sinclair	
1930	Holiday	Ned Seton	
1930	Free Love	Rush Begelow	
1931	Ten Cents A Dance	Eddie Miller	
1931	Honor Among Lovers	Philip Craig	
1931	Indiscreet	Jim Woodward	
1931	This Modern Age	Tony Gerard	
1932	Unashamed	Harry Swift	
1932	Hat Check Girl	Tod Reese	
1932	Call Her Savage	Lawrence Crosby	
1933	The Keyhole	Maurice Le Brun	
1933	The Woman Who Dared	Jack Goodwin, Newspaper Reporter	
1933	Ex-Lady	Nick Malvyn	
1933	Brief Moment	Harold Sigrift	
1933	Twin Husbands	Colton Drain	
1934	Little Man, What Now?	Kessler	
1934	Wild Gold	Walter Jordan	
1934	Shock	Bob Hayworth	
1934	She Was a Lady	Jerry Couzins	
1934	Behold My Wife!	Bob Prentice	
1935	Rumba	Hobart Fletcher	
1935	Goin' to Town	Fletcher Colton	
1935	Remember Last Night?	Billy Arliss	
1936	Private Number	Coakley	
1936	Yellowstone	Marty Ryan / Jenkins	
1936	Mr. Cinderella	Aloysius P. Merriweather	
1936	Hideaway Girl	Count de Montaigne	
1937	The Hit Parade	Teddy Leeds	
