= Elisabeth Cobb =

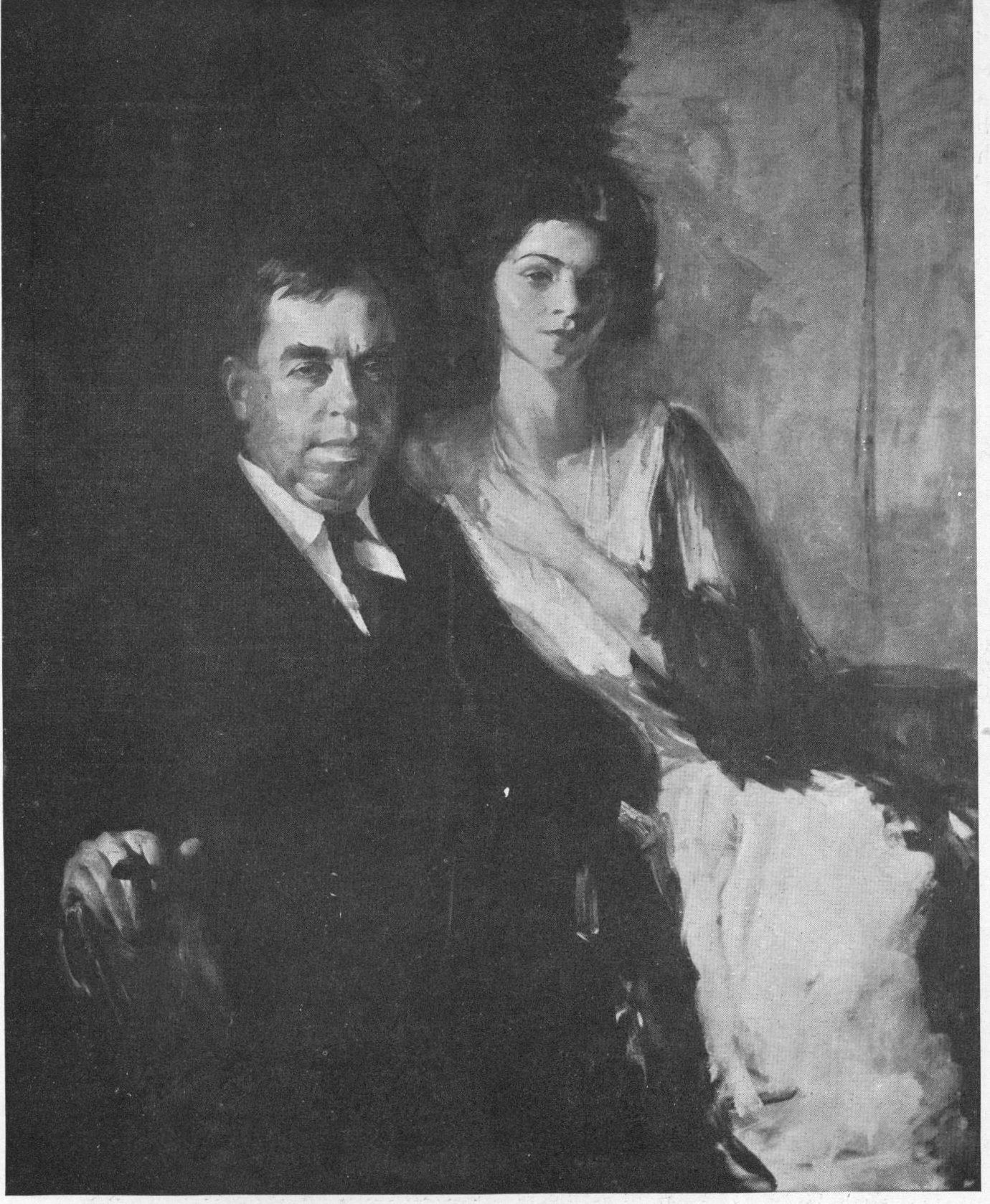
Portrait of Elisabeth Cobb and her father Irvin S. Cobb by Wayman Elbridge Adams

Elisabeth Cobb (8 October 1902 – 26 May 1959) was an American writer. Her father was Irvin S. Cobb, a well-known humorist. One of her best known works was her 1934 novel She Was A Lady. She died in New York in May 1959.

== Early life and career (1902-1927) ==
Cobb attended the Skerton Finishing School. Cobb worked in the editorial department of The Bookman in the early 1920s. In 1924, a manuscript of Cobb's was published in Liberty. Her first novel Falling Seeds was published in 1927 by Doubleday, Page and Company, when she was 25. The novel deals with the marriage of a Southern belle to a Yankee.

== Writing career (1927-1950s) ==
Cobb's second novel Minstrels in Satin was published in 1929. The novel is about a young divorced woman living in Italy who has three children. The mother would focus more on her social life than the wellbeing of her children, who learned to be self-sufficient. Critics had generally favorable opinions on the novel.

Cobb's third novel She Was A Lady was serialized in McCall's magazine before it was published in 1934. The novel would receive a film adaptation in 1934.

After her father's death in 1944, Cobb wrote a biography of her father titled My Wayward Parent, and part of it was serialized in the August 1945 issue of Cosmopolitan before it was published in late 1945. It reviewed well, and was a sales success.

In 1947–1948, a comedy play Cobb co-wrote with Herschel Williams was produced titled The Men We Marry. It was shown on Jan. 15, 1948 at the Mansfield Theatre.

In the early 1950s, Cobb would travel lecturing on various topics.

== Personal life ==
Cobb first married singer Frank M. Chapman Jr on February 24, 1924, in Manhattan and divorced him on March 10, 1930, in Reno, Nevada. There was one child from the marriage, Buff Cobb, born in 1926.

Her next marriage was to Alton A. Brody, who worked in real estate, on September 4, 1930. She would divorce him on Feb. 16, 1938 in Las Vegas, Nevada. Her final marriage was to Cameron Rogers, a writer, on November 21, 1938.

Cobb converted to Catholicism in 1948.

Cobb died aged 56 on May 25, 1959, at a New York hospital and was survived by her mother and children. Her grave is at Oak Grove Cemetery, beside her father.

== Works ==
- Falling Seeds, 1927 (novel, published by Doubleday, Page and Company)
- Minstrels in Satin, 1929 (novel, published by Doubleday Doran and Co.)
- She Was A Lady, 1934 (novel, published by Bobbs-Merrill Company)
- My Wayward Parent, 1945 (biography, published by Bobbs-Merrill Company)
- The Men We Marry, 1947 (play) with Herschel Williams
