= The Woman Who Dared (1933 film) =

1933 film by Millard Webb

- Directed by: Millard Webb
- Screenplay by: Curtis Kenyon
- Story by: King Guidice; Charles E. Roberts; Robert Webb
- Produced by: William Berke
- Starring: Claudia Dell; Monroe Owsley; Lola Lane
- Cinematography: Robert E. Cline
- Music by: Lee Zahler
- Production company: William Berke Productions
- Distributed by: Imperial Distributing Corporation
- Release date: April 15, 1933 (U.S.)
- Running time: 60 minutes
- Country: United States
- Language: English

The Woman Who Dared is a 1933 American drama film directed by Millard Webb and starring Claudia Dell, Monroe Owsley and Lola Lane. It was produced by William Berke and scored by Lee Zahler.

== Cast ==
- Claudia Dell as Mickey Martin - Factory Owner
- Monroe Owsley as Jack Goodwin, Newspaper Reporter
- Lola Lane as Kay Wilson - Office Secretary
- Douglas Fowley as Kay's Boyfriend
- Robert Elliott as Attorney
- Matty Fain as Sciato - a Racketeer
- Bryant Washburn
- Eddie Kane as King
- Esther Muir as Mae Compton
- Matthew Betz as Racketeer
- Paul Fix as Racketeer
- Sidney Bracey as Tom
- Joseph W. Girard as Police captain
- Herbert Evans
