= She Was a Lady (film) =

1934 film

- Theatrical release poster
- Directed by: Hamilton MacFadden
- Screenplay by: Gertrude Purcell
- Based on: She Was a Lady by Elisabeth Cobb
- Produced by: Al Rockett
- Starring: Helen Twelvetrees; Donald Woods; Ralph Morgan; Monroe Owsley
- Cinematography: Bert Glennon
- Edited by: Dorothy Spencer
- Music by: Samuel Kaylin
- Production company: Fox Film Corporation
- Distributed by: Fox Film Corporation
- Release date: August 22, 1934
- Running time: 77 minutes
- Country: United States
- Language: English

She Was a Lady is a 1934 American comedy drama film directed by Hamilton MacFadden and starring Helen Twelvetrees, Donald Woods, Ralph Morgan and Monroe Owsley. The film was produced and distributed by Fox Film, one of the major Hollywood studios. The screenplay was by Gertrude Purcell, based on the 1934 novel She Was a Lady by Elisabeth Cobb.

== Plot ==
Sheila Vane, the daughter of an English aristocrat and a maid, is raised in Montana where her parents settled after he was rejected by his family after marrying outside of his class. While working at a guest ranch, she encounters the playboy Tommy Traill who falls in love. However she rejects him to fulfil her father's wish that she should return to England to reclaim her rightful place as part of the Vane family. On arriving at their country estate Vane Manor, she is treated dismissively by her aunt and uncle who fear that the scandal will ruin their own daughter's upcoming prospects as debutante. Sheila's grandfather, meanwhile, is still the family butler. Returning to America in New York City Tommy invites her to meet his father. However he proves dismissive of her, believing that she is a social climber and unaware of her aristocratic background.

== Cast ==
- Helen Twelvetrees as Sheila Vane
- Donald Woods as Tommy Traill
- Ralph Morgan as Stanley Vane
- Monroe Owsley as Jerry Couzins
- Irving Pichel as Marco
- Doris Lloyd as Alice Vane
- Kitty Kelly as Daisy
- Halliwell Hobbes as George Dane
- Mary Forbes as Lady Diana Vane
- Jackie Searl as Herbie Vane
- Barbara Weeks as Moira
- Karol Kay as Sheila
- Paul Harvey as Jeff Dyer
- Harold Goodwin as Yank
- Anne Howard as Iris Vane
- Samuel S. Hinds as Mr. Traill
- Frank Dawson as Huggins
- Edward Gargan as Bull
- Edith Fellows as Child
- Carlton Griffin as Clerk

== Bibliography ==
- Solomon, Aubrey. The Fox Film Corporation, 1915-1935: A History and Filmography. McFarland, 2011.
