= Unashamed (film) =

1932 film

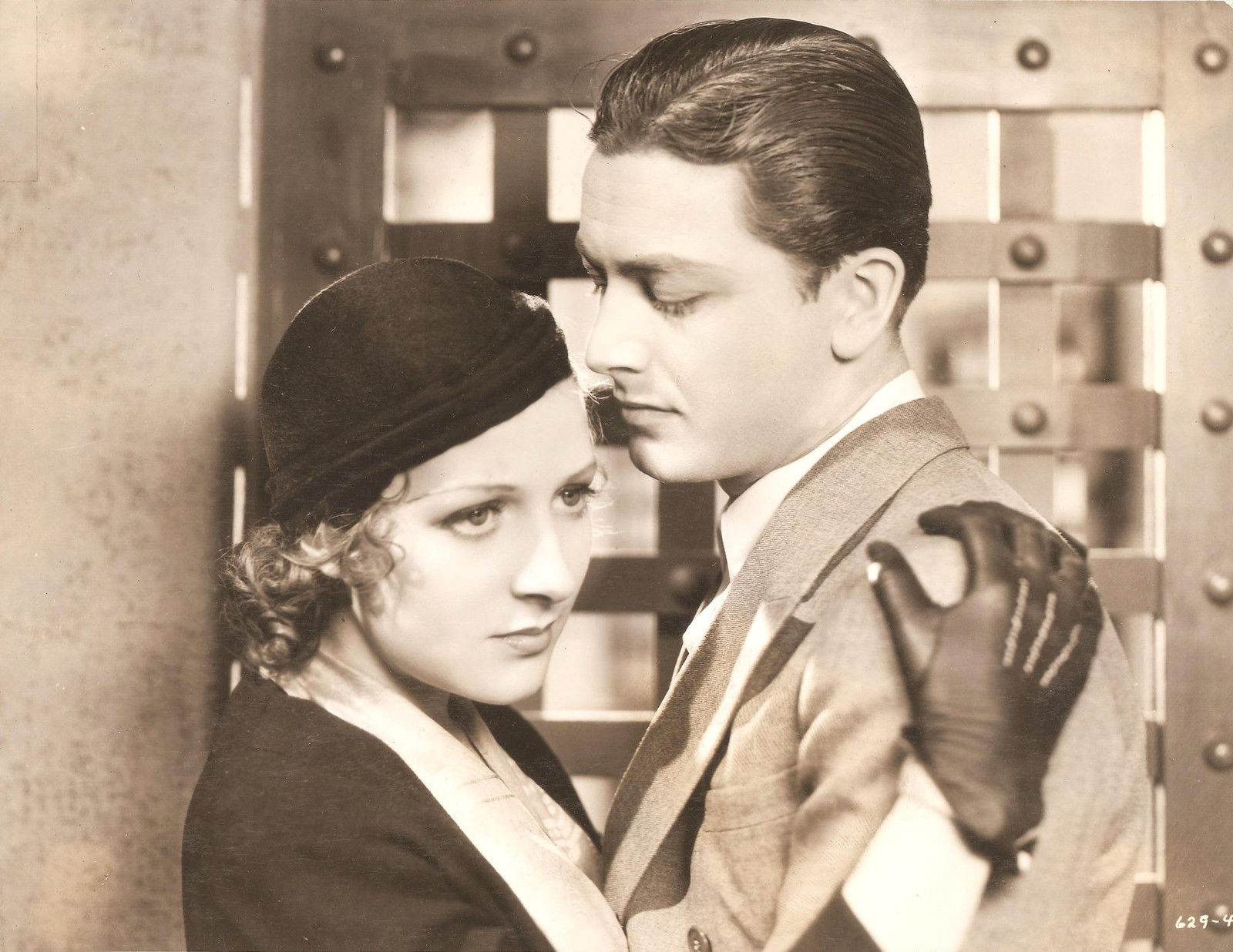
- Twelvetrees and Young
- Directed by: Harry Beaumont
- Screenplay by: Bayard Veiller
- Starring: Helen Twelvetrees; Robert Young; Lewis Stone; Jean Hersholt; John Miljan; Monroe Owsley
- Cinematography: Norbert Brodine
- Edited by: William S. Gray
- Production company: Metro-Goldwyn-Mayer
- Distributed by: Loew's Inc.
- Release date: July 2, 1932
- Running time: 77 minutes
- Country: United States
- Language: English

Unashamed is a 1932 American pre-Code crime drama film directed by Harry Beaumont, written by Bayard Veiller and starring Helen Twelvetrees, Robert Young, Lewis Stone, Jean Hersholt, John Miljan and Monroe Owsley. It was released on July 2, 1932, by Metro-Goldwyn-Mayer.

The film, as well as the same year's Two Against the World, is based on a Philadelphia society "honor killing" committed by Eddie Allen.

== Cast ==
- Helen Twelvetrees as Joan Ogden
- Robert Young as Dick Ogden
- Lewis Stone as Henry Trask
- Jean Hersholt as Heinrich Schmidt
- John Miljan as District Attorney Harris
- Monroe Owsley as Harry Swift
- Robert Warwick as Mr. Ogden
- Gertrude Michael as Marjorie
- Wilfrid North as Judge Ambrose
- Thomas E. Jackson as Captain Timothy Riorden
- Louise Beavers as Amanda Jones
- Herman Bing as Hans (unaccredited)

== Reception ==
Toronto's The Globe noted that the film "wove many new and modern angles into a strange gripping story."

The Spokesman-Review noted that Twelvetrees was given "a role that fits her well" after "ups and downs," and "the result is a picture of good entertainment value. Young is also a capable actor and gives Miss Twelvetrees adequate support."
