= Irvin S. Cobb =

American author, humorist, editor and columnist (1876 – 1944)

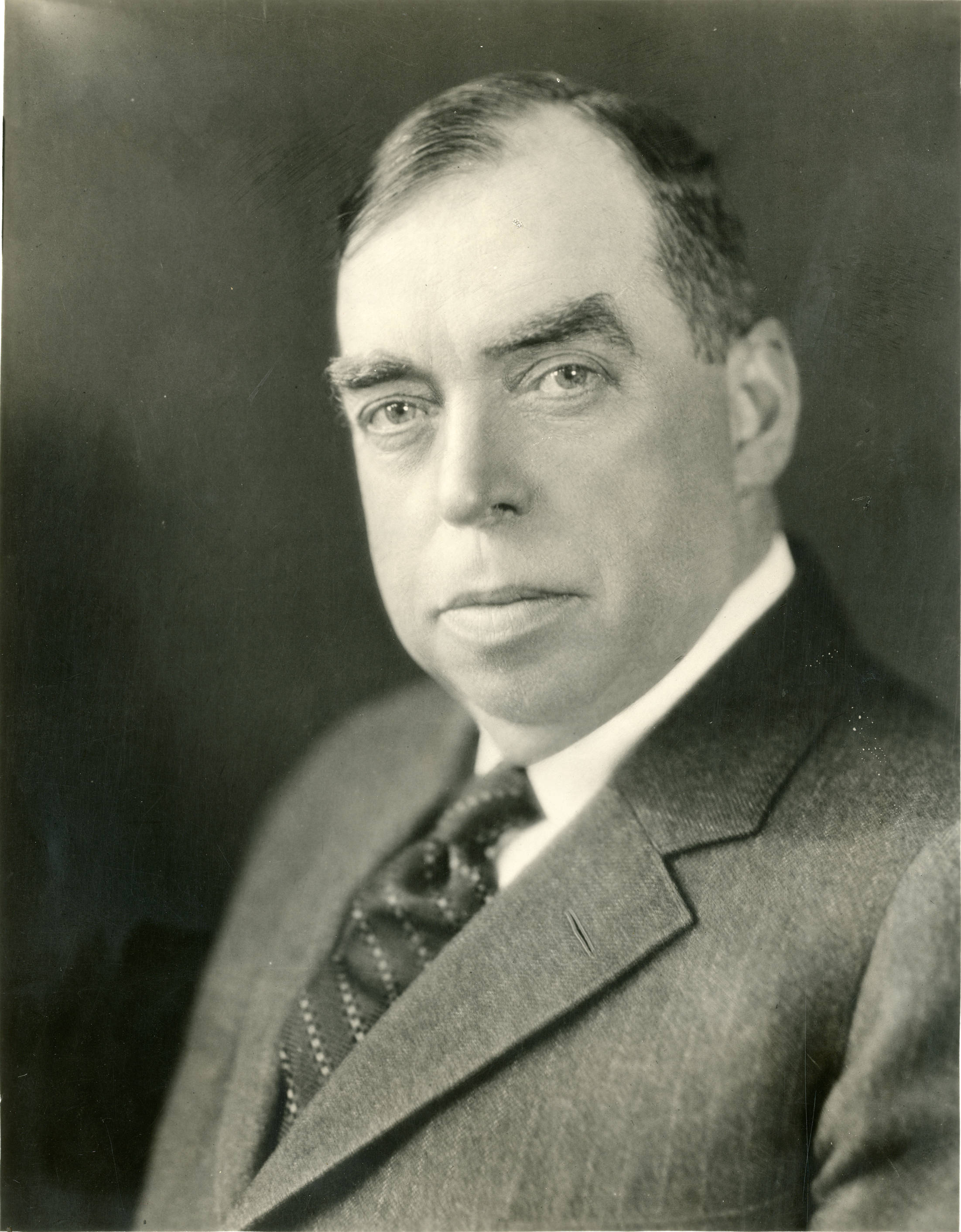
- Cobb in 1930
- Born: Irvin Shrewsbury Cobb; June 23, 1876; Paducah, Kentucky, U.S.
- Died: March 11, 1944 (aged 67); New York City, New York, U.S.
- Spouse(s): Laura Spencer Baker (1900–1944)
- Children: Elisabeth Cobb

Irvin Shrewsbury Cobb (June 23, 1876 – March 11, 1944) was an American author, humorist, editor and columnist from Paducah, Kentucky, who relocated to New York in 1904, living there for the remainder of his life. He wrote for the New York World, Joseph Pulitzer's newspaper, as the highest paid staff reporter in the United States.

Cobb also wrote more than 60 books and 300 short stories. Some of his works were adapted for silent movies. Several of his Judge Priest short stories were adapted in the 1930s for two feature films directed by John Ford.

== Biography ==
Cobb was the second of four children born to Kentucky natives in Paducah, Kentucky. His maternal grandfather, Reuben Saunders, M.D., is credited with discovering in 1873 that injections of morphine-atropine were useful in treating cholera. Cobb was raised in Paducah, and the events and people of his childhood became the basis for much of his later works. Later in life, Cobb was nicknamed "Duke of Paducah".

Cobb was educated in public and private elementary schools, and then entered William A. Cade's Academy intending to pursue a law career. When Cobb was 16, his father became an alcoholic, after the death of his grandfather. Forced to quit school and find work, Cobb began his writing career.

=== Writing career ===
Cobb started in journalism with the Paducah Daily News at age seventeen, and became the nation's youngest managing news editor at age nineteen. He later worked at the Louisville Evening Post for a year and a half.

His anecdotal memoir-cum-autobiography, Exit Laughing, published in 1941, includes a firsthand account of the assassination of Kentucky Governor William Goebel in 1900 and the trials of the killers. He wrote numerous series in periodicals, and also collaborated on dramatic productions.

After moving to New York in 1904, Cobb was hired by the Evening Sun. The publication sent him to Portsmouth, New Hampshire to cover the Russian-Japanese peace conference. His dispatches from the negotiations, emphasizing the personalities involved (including President Theodore Roosevelt), were published across the country with the title "Making Peace at Portsmouth." They earned him a job offer from Joseph Pulitzer's New York World and he became the highest-paid staff reporter in the United States. During the murder trial of Harry Kendall Thaw in 1907, Cobb coined the term "sob sister" to describe the women reporters who were covering the trial.

Cobb joined the staff of the magazine The Saturday Evening Post in 1911, and covered the Great War for the magazine. At the same time, he wrote a book about his experiences, published in 1915, titled Paths Of Glory. After a second visit to France to cover the Great War, Cobb publicized the achievements of the unit known as the Harlem Hellfighters, most notably, Croix de Guerre recipients Henry Johnson and Needham Roberts. His article "Young Black Joe," published on August 24, 1918, in The Saturday Evening Post and later republished in Cobb's book, The Glory of the Coming, highlighted the discipline and courage displayed by black American soldiers fighting in Europe during World War I. The three-page article and half-page photograph reached a national audience of more than two million readers, and was widely reprinted in the black press. Yet, after Cobb had enthusiastically touted the bestselling autobiography of Chief Buffalo Child Long Lance only to find out later that Long Lance was considered to be more Black than Native American, "he was incensed. 'To think that we had him here in the house...We’re so ashamed! We entertained a nigger.' ”

In the midst of covering the 1920 Democratic Convention, Cobb received 1.5 votes on the 23rd Presidential ballot.

=== Hollywood ===
Several of Cobb's stories were adapted as silent movies. He also wrote the screen titles for other movies, including the Jackie Coogan movie, Peck's Bad Boy (1921). With the advent of sound, more of his stories were adapted for the screen, including The Woman Accused (1933), featuring young Cary Grant.

John Ford twice made movies based on Cobb's Judge Priest stories: Judge Priest (1934) featured Will Rogers in the title role. The Sun Shines Bright (1953) was based on his short stories "The Sun Shines Bright", "The Mob from Massac", and "The Lord Provides".

Cobb also had an acting career, acting in ten movies between 1932 and 1938. He won major roles in such movies as Pepper, Everybody's Old Man (1936), and Hawaii Calls (1938). He was also host of the 7th Academy Awards in 1935.

In 1919, Cobb was recruited by former U.S. Navy officer and lawyer Capt. W.H. Slayton to become chairman of the Authors and Artists Committee of the Association Against the Prohibition Amendment (AAPA). The Association based their opposition on the misuse of national government power over U.S. citizens. As chairman, Cobb helped extend coverage of their message through the media and artist networks. "If Prohibition is a noble experiment," he said in one, "then the San Francisco fire and the Galveston flood should be listed among the noble experiments of our national history." As part of his AAPA efforts he published the anti-Prohibition novel Red Likker. After the repeal of Prohibition, Frankfort Distilleries recruited him to compile a recipe book to remind consumers who were out of practice how to mix a good drink.

The cartoon The Woods Are Full of Cuckoos caricatures Cobb as "Irvin S. Frog".

=== Personal life ===
Cobb has been described as having a round shape, bushy eyebrows, full lips, and a triple chin, with a cigar always hanging from his mouth.

He married the former Laura Spencer Baker of Savannah, Georgia. Their daughter, Elisabeth Cobb (born 1902, died 1959), was also an author. She published the novel She Was a Lady and the nonfiction My Wayward Parent (1945), a book about her father. Her first husband was Frank Michler Chapman, Jr., son of the ornithologist Frank Michler Chapman.

Cobb's granddaughter was Buff Cobb, a television actress of the early 1950s. She married journalist Mike Wallace as his second wife.

Cobb was honored in 1915 with the march "The War Correspondent" by G. E. Holmes, published by the John Church Company.

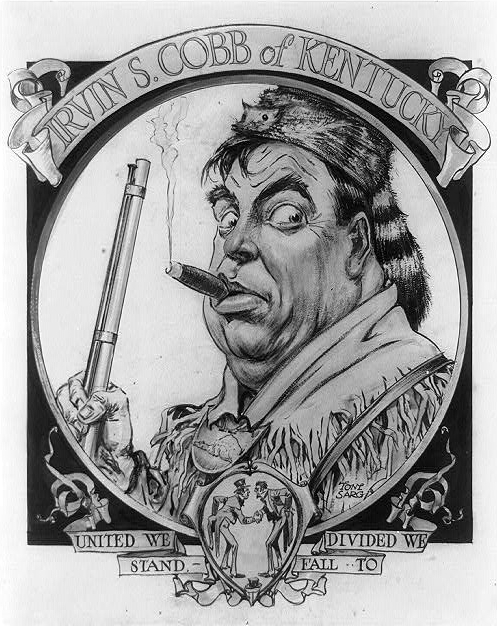
Irvin S. Cobb wearing a coonskin cap and smoking a cigar. Illustration by Tony Sarg for "The Glory of the States: Kentucky" by Irvin S. Cobb, published in The American Magazine for May 1916.

Cobb was inducted into the Kentucky Writers' Hall of Fame on February 2, 2017.

When Cobb died in New York City in 1944, his body was sent to Paducah for cremation. His ashes were placed under a dogwood tree. The granite boulder marking his remains is inscribed "Irvin Shrewsbury Cobb 1876-1944 Back Home".

Cobb wrote a letter detailing his desired funeral arrangements. The document reads in part:

Above all I want no long faces and no show of grief at the burying ground. Kindly observe the final wishes of the undersigned and avoid reading the so-called Christian burial service which, in view of the language employed in it, I regard as one of the most cruel and paganish things inherited by our forebears from our remote pagan ancestors. In deference to the faith of our dear mother who was through her lifetime a loyal though never bigoted communicant of that congregation, perhaps the current pastor of the First Presbyterian Church would consent to read the Twenty-third Psalm, which was her favorite passage in the Scriptures and is mine since it contains no charnel words, no morbid mouthings about corruption and decay and, being mercifully without creed or dogma, carries no threat of eternal hell-fire for those parties we do not like, no direct promise of a heaven which, if one may judge by the people who are surest of going there, must be a powerfully dull place, populated to a considerable and uncomfortable degree by prigs, time-servers and unpleasantly aggressive individuals. Hell may have a worse climate but undoubtedly the company is sprightlier. The Catholics, with their genius for stage-management, handle this detail better. The officiating clergyman speaks in Latin and the parishioners, being unacquainted with that language are impressed by the majesty of the rolling, sonorous periods without being shocked by distressing allusions and harrowing references.

== Legacy and honors ==
The Brookport Bridge, which spans the Ohio River between Cobb's hometown of Paducah and Brookport, Illinois, was renamed in his honor in 1943.

The World War II Liberty Ship SS Irvin S. Cobb was named in his honor.

Following the Second World War, the Illinois Central Railroad named a passenger train operating between Louisville and Memphis, via Paducah, the Irvin S. Cobb. The train carried timetable numbers 103 southbound and 104 northbound and made a direct connection at Fulton with trains to and from New Orleans.

== Fiction ==
Cobb wrote humorous stories set in Kentucky, and he is considered part of the American literary regionalism school. These stories were first collected in the book Old Judge Priest (1915), whose title character was based on a prominent West Kentucky judge named William Pitman Bishop. Joel Chandler Harris wrote of these tales, "Cobb created a South peopled with honorable citizens, charming eccentrics, and loyal, subservient blacks, but at their best the Judge Priest stories are dramatic and compelling, using a wealth of precisely rendered detail to evoke a powerful mood." Among Cobb's other books are the humorous Speaking of Operations (1916), and an anti-prohibition ode to bourbon, Red Likker (1929).

Cobb also wrote short stories in the horror genre, such as "Fishhead" (1911) and "The Unbroken Chain" (1923). "Fishhead" has been cited as an inspiration for H. P. Lovecraft's The Shadow Over Innsmouth, while "The Unbroken Chain" was a model for Lovecraft's "The Rats in the Walls". The former was described by Lovecraft as "banefully effective in its portrayal of unnatural affinities between a hybrid idiot and the strange fish of an isolated lake" in his essay Supernatural Horror in Literature.

== Bibliography ==
- "A Little Town Called Montignies St. Christophe" – 1907 story
- Funabashi – 1907 musical comedy
- Mr. Busybody – 1908 musical comedy
- Talks with the Fat Chauffeur – 1909 collection
- "The Escape of Mr. Trimm" – 1910 story
- "The Exit of Anse Dugmore" – 1911 story
- Cobb's Anatomy – 1912 book
- "Words and Music" – 1912 story
- Back Home: Being the Narrative of Judge Priest and His People – 1912 collection
- The Escape of Mr. Trimm: His Plight and Other Plights – 1913 collection
- Cobb's Bill of Fare – 1913 book
- "Fishhead" – 1913 story
- Roughing It De Luxe – 1913 book
- Europe Revised – 1914 book
- Irvin Cobb at his Best – 1915 collection
- Back Home - 1912, produced as a comedy, 1915
- Paths of Glory: Impressions of War Written at and Near the Front (expanded as The Red Glutton) – 1915 book
- Speaking of Operations – 1915 book
- Old Judge Priest – 1916 collected stories
- Fibble, D.D. – 1916 collection
- Local Color – 1916 collection
- Speaking of Prussians – 1917 book
- "The Lost Tribes of the Irish in the South" – 1917 booklet
- Those Times and These – 1917 collection
- "The Great Auk" – 1917 story
- The Thunders of Silence – 1918 book
- "Boys Will be Boys" – 1918 story
- The Glory of the Coming: What Mine Eyes Have Seen of Americans in Action in This Year of Grace and Allied Endeavor – 1919 book
- Eating in Two or Three Languages – 1919 book
- The Life of the Party – 1919 book
- The Works of Irvin S. Cobb (14 volumes) – 1912-20 collections
- From Place to Place – 1920 collection
- Oh, Well, You Know How Women Are! – published in one volume with Isn't That Just Like a Man! by Mary Roberts Rinehart – 1920 book
- The Abandoned Farmers – 1920 collection
- A Plea for Old Cap Collier – 1921 book
- "Darkness" – 1921 story
- A Bull Called Emily – 1921 story
- One Third Off – 1921 book
- Sundry Accounts – 1922 collection
- J. Poindexter, Colored – 1922 book
- Myself to Date – 1923 book (Stickfuls: Compositions of a Newspaper Minion)
- A Laugh a Day Keeps the Doctor Away: His Favorite Stories as Told by Irvin S. Cobb – 1923 collection
- Snake Doctor and Other Stories – 1923 collection
- "The Snake Doctor" – 1923 story
- One Block from Fifth Avenue – 1923 story
- Goin' on Fourteen: Being Cross-sections Out of a Year in the Life of an Average Boy – 1924 book
- Indiana: Cobb's America Guyed Books – 1924 book
- Kansas: Cobb's America Guyed Books – 1924 book
- Kentucky: Cobb's America Guyed Books – 1924 book
- Maine: Cobb's America Guyed Books – 1924 book
- New York: Cobb's America Guyed Books – 1924 book
- "The Chocolate Hyena" – 1924 story
- North Carolina: Cobb's America Guyed Books – 1924 book
- Alias Ben Alibi – 1925 book
- Many Laughs for Many Days: Another Year's Supply of His Favorite Stories as Told by Irvin S. Cobb – 1925 collection
- "Here Comes the Bride" –, and So Forth – 1925 book
- On an Island That Cost $24.00 – 1926 book
- Prose and Cons – 1926 book
- Some United States: A Series of Stops in Various Part of This Nation with One Excursion Across the Line – 1926 book
- All Aboard: A Saga of the Romantic River – 1927 book
- Ladies and Gentlemen – 1927 book
- Chivalry Peak – 1927 book
- "This Man's World" – 1929 story
- Red Likker – 1929 book
- This Man's World – 1929 collection
- "At the Feet of the Enemy" – 1929 story
- Both Sides of the Street – 1930 collection
- To Be Taken Before Sailing – 1930 book
- The Belled Buzzard – 1930 story
- Three Wise Men on the East Side – 1930 story
- Incredible Truth – 1931 collection
- Down Yonder with Judge Priest and Irvin S. Cobb – 1932 collection
- "A Colonel of Kentucky" – 1932 story
- Murder Day by Day – 1933 book
- One Way to Stop a Panic – 1933 book
- "Who's Who" Plus "Here's How!" – 1934 book
- "Faith, Hope, and Charity" – 1934 story
- Faith, Hope, and Charity – 1934 collection
- Irvin S. Cobb's Own Recipe Book – 1936 book
- Judge Priest Turns Detective – 1936 book
- Azam: The Story of An Arabian Colt and His Friends – 1937 children's book
- Four Useful Pups – 1940 children's book
- Favorite Humorous Stories of Irvin S. Cobb – 1940 collection
- Exit Laughing – 1941 book
- Glory, Glory, Hallelujah – 1941 book
- Roll Call – 1942 collection
- Cobb's Cavalcade – 1944 collection
- The Governors of Kentucky – 1947 book
- Piano Jim and the Impotent Pumpkin Vine – 1950 book

== Filmography ==
- Fields of Honor (1918)
- The Woman Accused (1933), featuring a young Cary Grant
- Judge Priest (1934) starring Will Rogers
- Everybody's Old Man (1936)
- From Now On (1937)
- The Sun Shines Bright (1953)
