= Buff Cobb =

American actress, television personality and producer (1927–2010)

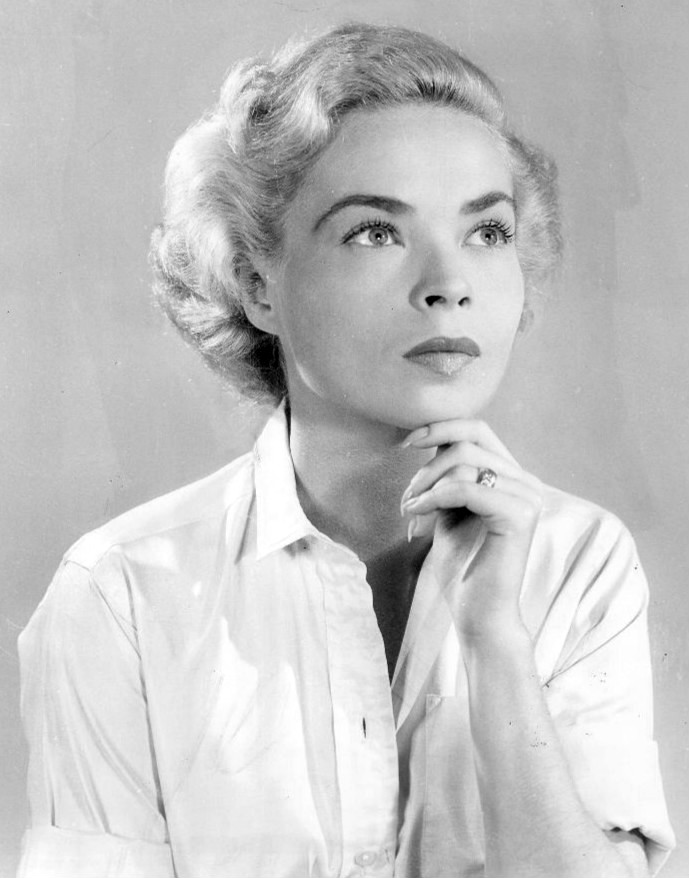
- Cobb in 1957
- Born: Patrizia Cobb Chapman; October 19, 1927; Florence, Tuscany, Kingdom of Italy
- Died: July 12, 2010 (aged 82); Lebanon, New Hampshire, U.S.
- Occupations: Actress; television personality; producer
- Years active: 1940s–1970s
- Spouses: Greg Bautzer (m. 1944; div. 1945) William Eythe (m. 1947; div. 1948) Mike Wallace (m. 1949; div. 1955) H. Spencer Martin (m. 1967; died 1987)
- Relatives: Irvin S. Cobb (maternal grandfather), Frank Chapman (paternal grandfather)

Buff Cobb (born Patrizia Cobb Chapman, October 19, 1927 – July 12, 2010) was an Italian-born American actress and, with then-husband Mike Wallace, host of one of television's first talk-shows.

== Early life and career ==
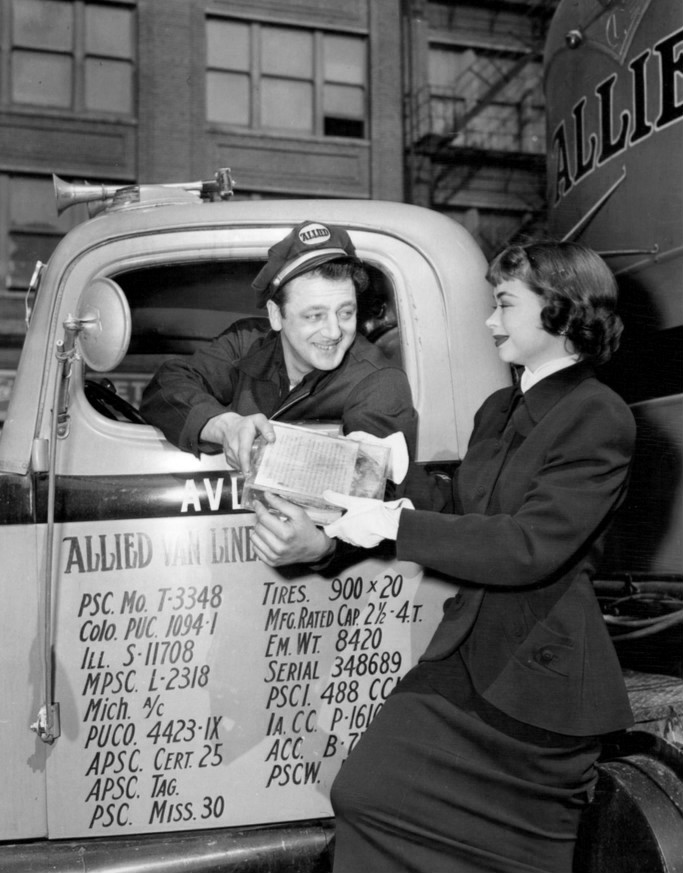
Cobb with Ralph Edwards on a 1949 stunt of the radio version of Truth or Consequences

Patrizia Cobb Chapman was born in Florence, Tuscany, Italy, to opera singer Frank Chapman, whose own father was the ornithologist and pioneering writer of field guides Frank Michler Chapman, and playwright Elisabeth Cobb, whose father was the author and humorist Irvin S. Cobb. When she was young, her parents divorced and her father married mezzo-soprano opera singer Gladys Swarthout.

Her family moved first to New York City and then to Santa Monica, California, where Cobb graduated from high school. She began her acting career with stock companies, and then won bit parts in movies including Anna and the King of Siam (1946), and toured with Tallulah Bankhead in Noël Coward's play Private Lives from 1946 to 1948.

At 19, she married attorney Greg Bautzer, the first of her four husbands, divorcing him after six months. At 20, she married her second husband, actor William Eythe, in Manhattan in 1947. She sued for divorce after seven months, but reconsidered two days later before going on with the divorce in 1948.

== Talk-show pioneer ==
Cobb, while touring with Private Lives in Chicago, Illinois, met broadcast journalist Mike Wallace. As Wallace later recalled,

Buff Cobb was in Chicago when I got out of the Navy in '46. I think she was playing with Tallulah Bankhead in Private Lives at the time. She was an actress and a bit of a glamorous figure to me at that time. So I succumbed and taught her how to do interviewing, and we did a husband-and-wife broadcast for a while on NBC [radio] in Chicago. The interview show stopped first, and the marriage shortly thereafter. Maybe it was vice versa.

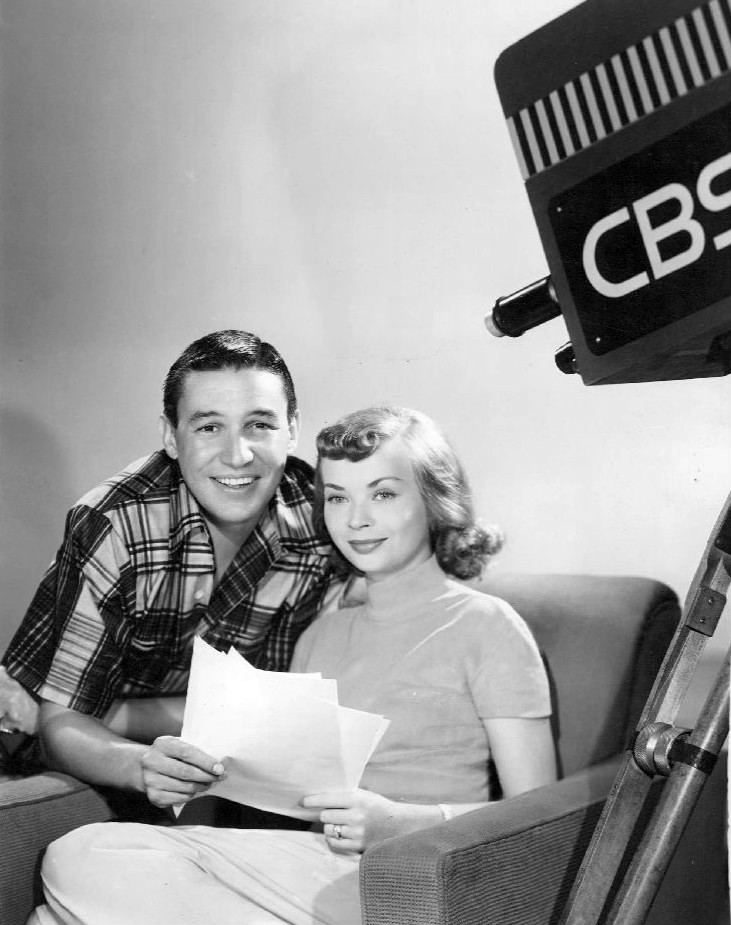
Publicity photo of Wallace and Cobb for Mike and Buff, 1951

By that time the program had gone from radio to become the pioneering CBS television talk show Mike and Buff. Based in New York City, it ran from August 20, 1951, to February 27, 1953. Originally titled Two Sleepy People, the live show, in which the couple debated a different topic daily and then tried to reach consensus after interviewing experts, was broadcast experimentally on weekday mornings during an era in which there was virtually no morning programming. It was also one of CBS' first color TV programs. By November 1951, it had been retitled Mike and Buff and was broadcast in black-and-white on weekday afternoons.

Beginning June 1951, the two also co-hosted a second show, All Around the Town, in which Wallace and Cobb conducted live interviews from locales including Coney Island, the New York City Ballet, backstage at the original Broadway production of Guys and Dolls starring Sam Levene as Nathan Detroit, and numerous restaurants. Initially a thrice-weekly late-afternoon show, and it moved to a Saturday 6-6:45 p.m. slot from November 10, 1951, to January 1952. It returned as a prime time series, sponsored by the soft drink Pepsi on Saturday nights at 9-9:30 p.m. from May to June 1952. The New York Times critic Jack Gould wrote in 1951 that "the presentation of Mike and Buff constituted an object lesson in how television can be eminently educational without being self-conscious about it."

Cobb was also a panelist for two years on the 1952 to 1960 TV quiz show Masquerade Party, joining Ogden Nash, bandleader Bobby Sherwood and others from 1953 to 1955 on the show, which during her tenure ran Monday nights on CBS before switching to Wednesday nights on ABC.

== Later life ==
Cobb and Wallace divorced in 1955. Cobb's fourth husband, H. Spencer Martin, died in 1987. She had a half brother, Thomas Cobb Brody.

In the 1960s, she and partners including Paul Vroom produced two Broadway shows: a revival of George Bernard Shaw's Too True to Be Good, which ran 94 performances and two previews at the 54th Street Theatre from March 9 to June 1, 1963; and Jerry Devine's Never Live Over a Pretzel Factory, which played nine performances and five previews from March 20 to April 4, 1964, at the Eugene O'Neill Theatre. The following decade, she and partner Shepard Traube (1907–1983) produced Devine's Children of the Wind, which ran six performances and one preview from October 23–27, 1973, at the Belasco Theatre.

Cobb died in a nursing home in Lebanon, New Hampshire, at age 82.

== Awards/nominations ==
- 1963 Tony Award nomination, Best Producer of a Play, with Paul Vroom and Burry Fredrik, for a revival of George Bernard Shaw's Too True to Be Good.
