= Jerry Bruckheimer =

American film and television producer (born 1943)

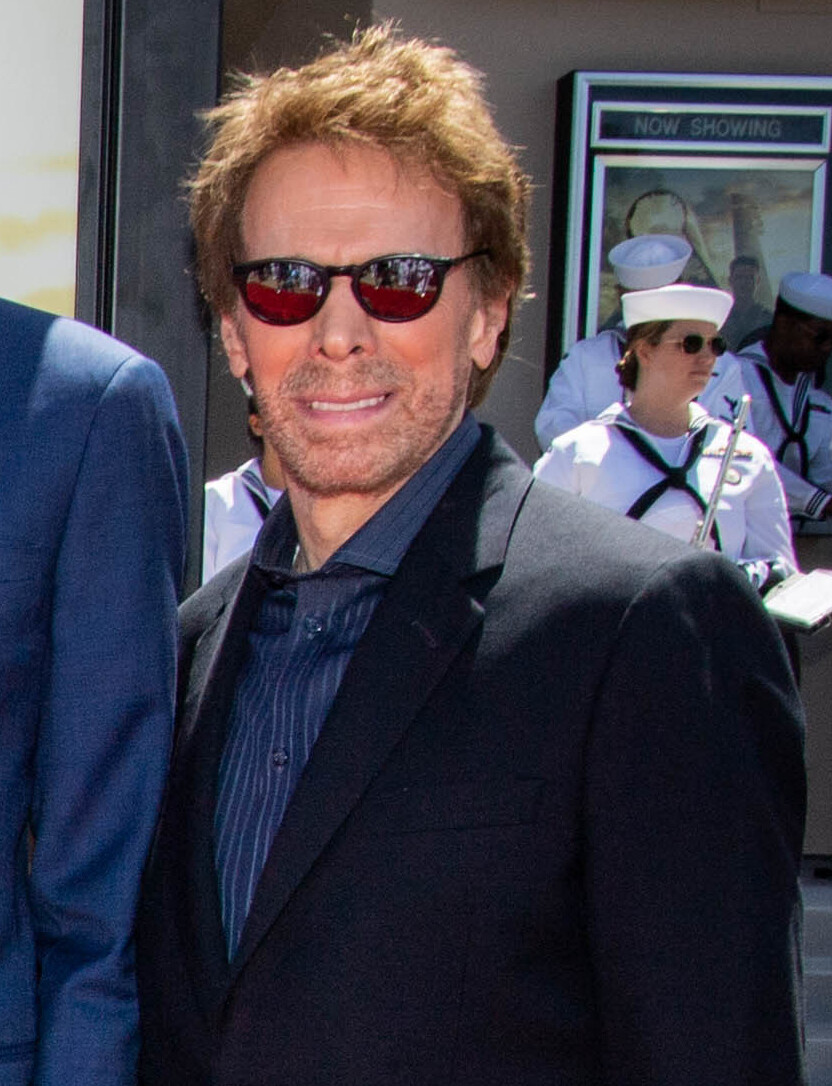
- Bruckheimer in 2022
- Born: Jerome Leonard Bruckheimer; September 21, 1943 (age 83); Detroit, Michigan, United States
- Education: University of Arizona (BA)
- Occupations: Producer; advertiser
- Years active: 1972–present
- Organization: Jerry Bruckheimer Films
- Notable work: Pirates of the Caribbean; Bad Boys; National Treasure; Beverly Hills Cop; Top Gun; CSI; Armageddon; Black Hawk Down
- Spouses: Bonnie Fishman (m. 1969; div. 1974) Linda Cobb (m. 1993)
- Children: 1 (Note: Stepdaughter)

Jerome Leonard Bruckheimer (born September 21, 1943) is an American film and television producer. He has been active in the genres of action, drama, comedy, fantasy, horror and science fiction. After working in advertising out of college, Bruckheimer moved into film production in the 1970s. In the 1980s and 1990s, he partnered with fellow producer Don Simpson. Bruckheimer and Simpson's partnership continued until Simpson's death in 1996. Bruckheimer has produced films including Flashdance, Days of Thunder, The Rock, Crimson Tide, Dangerous Minds, Con Air, Armageddon, Enemy of the State, Pearl Harbor, Black Hawk Down, as well as the Beverly Hills Cop, Top Gun, Bad Boys, Pirates of the Caribbean and National Treasure franchises.

At the helm of his self-titled production company, he has produced films that have been produced in association with and distributed by numerous film studios such as Paramount Pictures, Sony Pictures and Disney, while his television works have been co-produced by Warner Bros. Television and CBS Studios. In July 2003, Bruckheimer was honored by Variety as the first in Hollywood history to produce the first and second highest-grossing films of a single weekend: Pirates of the Caribbean: The Curse of the Black Pearl and Bad Boys II. In 2023, Top Gun: Maverick earned him his first Academy Award nomination for Best Picture at the 95th Academy Awards. He was nominated again in the same category for F1 (2025).

His best known television series are television dramas CSI: Crime Scene Investigation, CSI: Miami, CSI: NY, CSI: Cyber, Without a Trace, Cold Case, Lucifer and reality competition series The Amazing Race, which would spawn a franchise with international versions. For the latter, he won ten Primetime Emmy Awards. In 2003, three of his television productions—CSI: Crime Scene Investigation, Without a Trace and CSI: Miami—ranked among the top ten in the American ratings, making him the first producer to achieve this.

Bruckheimer is also the co-founder (with David Bonderman) and majority owner of the Seattle Kraken, the 2021 expansion team of the National Hockey League.

== Early life ==
Bruckheimer was born on September 21, 1943, in Detroit, Michigan, the son of German Jewish immigrants. He graduated from Mumford High School in 1961 in Detroit, at age 17, before moving to Arizona for college. Bruckheimer was also an active member of the Stamp Collecting Club. He graduated with a degree in psychology from the University of Arizona. He was a member of the Zeta Beta Tau fraternity. A film buff at an early age with an interest in photography, Bruckheimer would take snapshots when he had the opportunity. After college, Bruckheimer worked in advertising in Detroit (creative producer) and New York City. At the Detroit agency he worked on a one-minute ad spot for the new Pontiac GTO. Early in his career, Bruckheimer produced television commercials, including one for Pepsi.

== Career ==
=== 1970s and 1980s: From advertising to film production ===
Bruckheimer started producing films in the 1970s after leaving his job in advertising, with director Dick Richards. They worked together on the films The Culpepper Cattle Company, Farewell, My Lovely and March or Die. Bruckheimer then worked with Paul Schrader on two films, American Gigolo and Cat People, which began to attract notice for him in Hollywood.

During the 1980s and 1990s, he was a co-producer with Don Simpson of a string of highly successful films for Paramount Pictures. He first met Simpson at a screening of 1973's The Harder They Come at Warner Brothers. The two worked together and created Bruckheimer's first big hit, 1983's Flashdance, which brought in $95 million. He had a number of other hits during that time period, including the Beverly Hills Cop films, Top Gun and Days of Thunder. Top Gun marked his first collaboration with English director Tony Scott, who directed six films for Bruckheimer. The first Beverly Hills Cop movie, which was supposed to star Sylvester Stallone, launched Eddie Murphy's career and in just five days, became the highest grossing winter release in Paramount's history. On August 9, 1983, Bruckheimer and Simpson struck a three-year agreement with Paramount to produce theatrical and television projects through his new Simpson/Bruckheimer Productions company.

While working with Simpson, Bruckheimer became known as "Mr. Outside" because of his experience with filmmaking, while Simpson became known as "Mr. Inside" because of his film industry contacts. The Rock was the last film in which Bruckheimer collaborated with Simpson. After Simpson's death in 1996, Bruckheimer stipulated that The Rock be dedicated to the memory of Simpson.

=== 1990s: Big-budget films ===
In 1990, Bruckheimer and Simpson struck a $500 million deal with Paramount to produce five movies, entirely of their choice. However, his 1990 production of the film Days of Thunder, which starred Tom Cruise, did not perform as well as expected, which was a step backwards in the Bruckheimer-Simpson success story. The duo made a come-back in 1994, however, with the low-budget film ($12 million) The Ref.

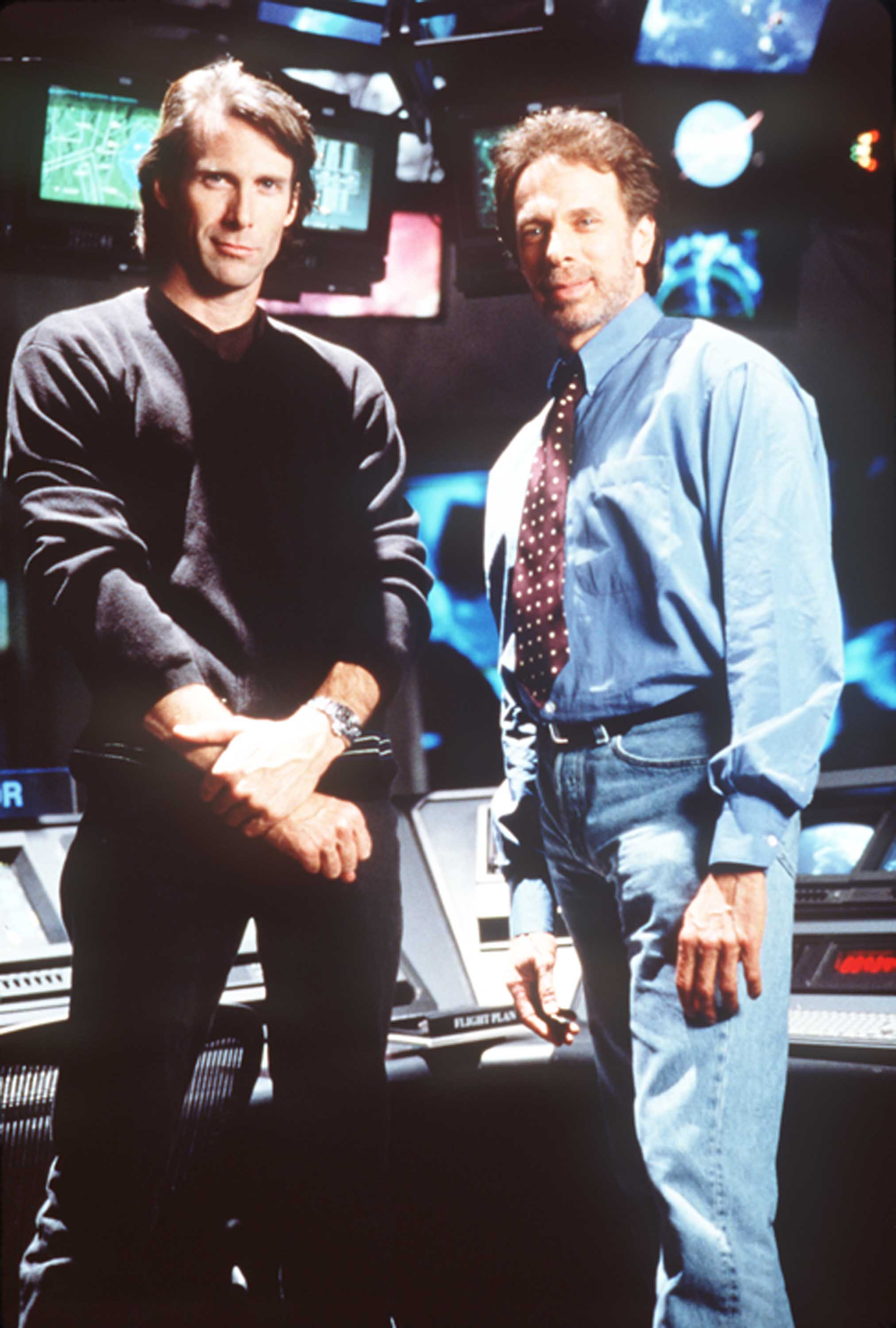
Bruckheimer (right) and Michael Bay during the filming of 1998's Armageddon

Despite Simpson's untimely death, Bruckheimer continued to produce a large number of action films, often working with director Michael Bay on several box office hits, including Armageddon. Other popular films he produced include Remember the Titans, Black Hawk Down and the Pirates of the Caribbean series. Bruckheimer has also acquired the rights to produce a film based on the popular role playing game by Palladium Books, Rifts. In the late 1990s, he started Technical Black Films to produce non-action films, with Remember the Titans being the only film produced.

=== 2000s: Franchises, television, video games ===
Since 1996, Bruckheimer has branched out into television, creating a number of police dramas of which CSI: Crime Scene Investigation has been the most notable on daytime television. He also produced the reality game show The Amazing Race. In May 2008, CBS announced it had picked up Bruckheimer's newest series, Eleventh Hour, for the 2008–2009 broadcast television season. The science fiction drama follows a government agent and a professor as they investigate strange scientific and medical activity.

From 2004 (beginning of CSI: NY) to 2009 (end of Without a Trace), Bruckheimer had six hit television shows on the air: CSI: Crime Scene Investigation, CSI: Miami, CSI: NY, Cold Case, Without a Trace and The Amazing Race. At one point, three of his television series ranked among the top 10 in the ratings.

In December 2007, Bruckheimer announced plans to partner with MTV to create a new game studio. The same year, Bruckheimer joined the ZeniMax Media board of directors and has since showed up at several launch parties for Bethesda Softworks titles, including Fallout 3, Fallout: New Vegas and The Elder Scrolls V: Skyrim. In 2009, Bruckheimer unveiled Jerry Bruckheimer Games, headed by former Microsoft Studios Publishing Executive Producer Jim Veevaert, as President of Production, and Jay Cohen, previously Ubisoft's Vice President of US Publishing, as President of Development.

It was announced on September 10, 2009, that NBC had picked up an action procedural from Bruckheimer. The show, titled Chase, "tells the stories of a team charged with making sure fugitive criminals don't evade justice," reports The Hollywood Reporter. It was canceled in May 2011, however. Skin, which was another Bruckheimer production, was cancelled in 2003, after only three episodes.

On February 13, 2026, Bruckheimer teased to Entertainment Tonight that when it came to the status update involving upcoming film installments of Pirates of the Caribbean and of Top Gun, that Bruckheimer is "expecting a script shortly" on the latter. He then further elaborated that "I think it's a horse race between the two of them, so we'll see." And "right now, Top Gun is a hair ahead, but that's it. We're expecting a script shortly."

=== 2010s: Independent producer, sports ===
In 2011, it was rumored that Jerry Bruckheimer Games was working on three titles, but nothing came to fruition. In March 2013, Jerry Bruckheimer Games was closed. Although Jerry Bruckheimer Games is closed, Bruckheimer still remained a ZeniMax board member, mostly due to being a close associate of former ZeniMax President Ernest Del, until ZeniMax was purchased by Microsoft in 2021.

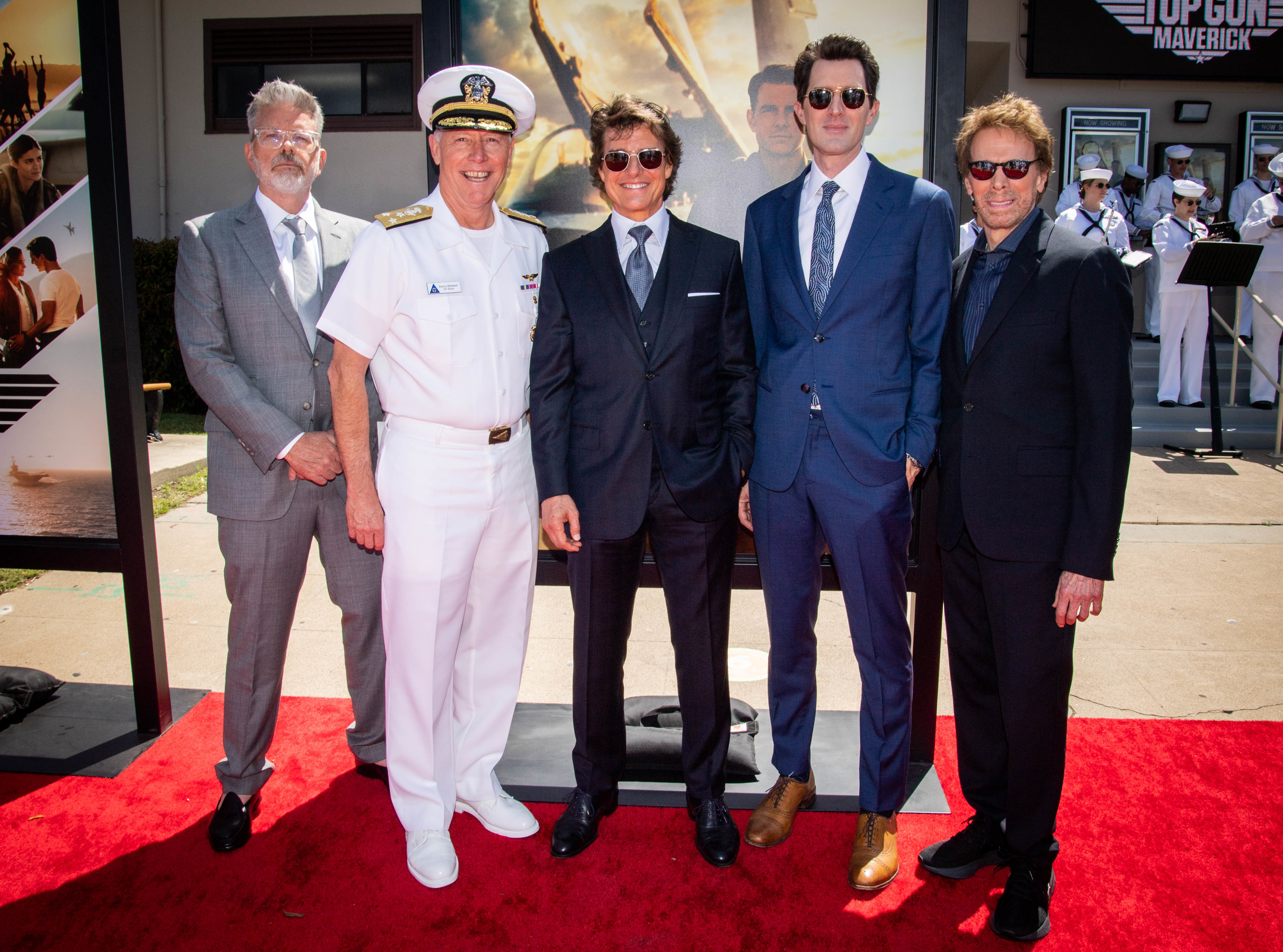
Christopher McQuarrie, Kenneth R. Whitesell, Tom Cruise, Joseph Kosinski and Bruckheimer at the global premiere of Top Gun: Maverick

In 2014, after the disappointment of The Sorcerer's Apprentice and The Lone Ranger, Bruckheimer and the Disney Studios chose to part ways by not renewing their first-look deal that expired that year. He signed a new first-look deal with Paramount that same year and mentioned a new Beverly Hills Cop and a Top Gun 2 as potential production ventures with his new partner.

In June 2016, Jerry Bruckheimer Television became an independent outfit, ending a 15-year run exclusive pact with Warner Bros Television. The next year, the production company signed a deal with CBS Television Studios. In 2020, it was reported that his first look deal with Paramount was not renewed.

Bruckheimer was named as one of the investors of a proposed sports arena in Las Vegas, and he had been rumored to be the leading choice by the National Hockey League (NHL) to own an expansion hockey team that would play in the arena. Bruckheimer was also named as one of the investors of a proposed Seattle-based NHL expansion team, whose application was submitted in early 2018. The NHL Board of Governors voted to approve the team, named the Seattle Kraken, on December 4, 2018, which started to play in the 2021–22 season. Bruckheimer was part of an investment group that also included Tim Leiweke (Oak View Group) and David Bonderman (minority owner NBA's Boston Celtics). Bruckheimer also reportedly plans to produce a film adaptation of Jorge Rivera-Herrans' Epic: The Musical, currently in early developmental stages.

== Impact on the film industry ==
=== High-profit productions ===
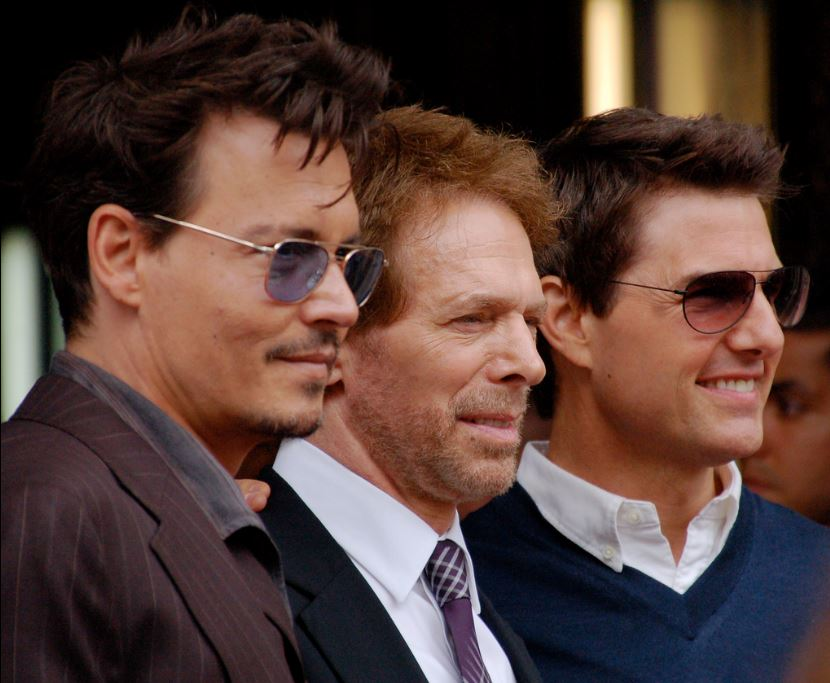
Bruckheimer (center) with Johnny Depp (left) and Tom Cruise (right) in June 2013

The movie Top Gun was produced in collaboration with the Pentagon to rebrand the US Navy's image after the Vietnam War and attract new Navy recruits. Top Gun was the first full-blown collaboration between Hollywood and the Navy. The model, which was developed by Bruckheimer, launched a new trend of military movies in the 1990s and onward.

In July 2003, Bruckheimer was honored by Variety as the first producer in Hollywood history to produce the top two highest-grossing films of a single weekend, the buddy-cop Bad Boys II and the Disney theme-park spin-off, Pirates of the Caribbean: The Curse of the Black Pearl. According to Variety, the "Bruckheimer touch" is characterized by a "consistently edgy, high-octane visual dynamic and equally distinctive storytelling driven by the triumphalism so popular with Madison Avenue".

The Pirates of the Caribbean film series, produced through Walt Disney Pictures, was enormously profitable and demonstrated Bruckheimer's ability to create lucrative projects. Pirates of the Caribbean: The Curse of the Black Pearl, which was the first film in the franchise, was released on July 9, 2003. A box office hit, the film was well received by both critics and filmgoers. After the unexpected success of the first film, Disney revealed that a trilogy was in the works. Pirates of the Caribbean: Dead Man's Chest was released on July 7, 2006. The sequel proved to be very successful, breaking records worldwide on the day of its premiere. In the end, the film acquired a total of $1,066,179,725 at the worldwide box office, becoming the third and fastest film to reach this amount. The third film in the series, Pirates of the Caribbean: At World's End, was released worldwide on May 25, 2007. Two more films, Pirates of the Caribbean: On Stranger Tides and Pirates of the Caribbean: Dead Men Tell No Tales, were released, in 2011 and 2017, respectively. Altogether, the film franchise has grossed over $4.5 billion worldwide.

=== Views on moviemaking ===
When asked on what the film industry's obligation to an audience was, he responded, "We are in the transportation business. We transport audiences from one place to another." When asked why he makes films, he stated, "If I made films for the critics, or for someone else, I'd probably be living in some small Hollywood studio apartment."

In a 1984 interview with the Los Angeles Times, Bruckheimer said, "We [he and Don Simpson] put together all the elements. We decide what aesthetic is right for a picture. We are as much a part of the process as the director."

== Personal life ==
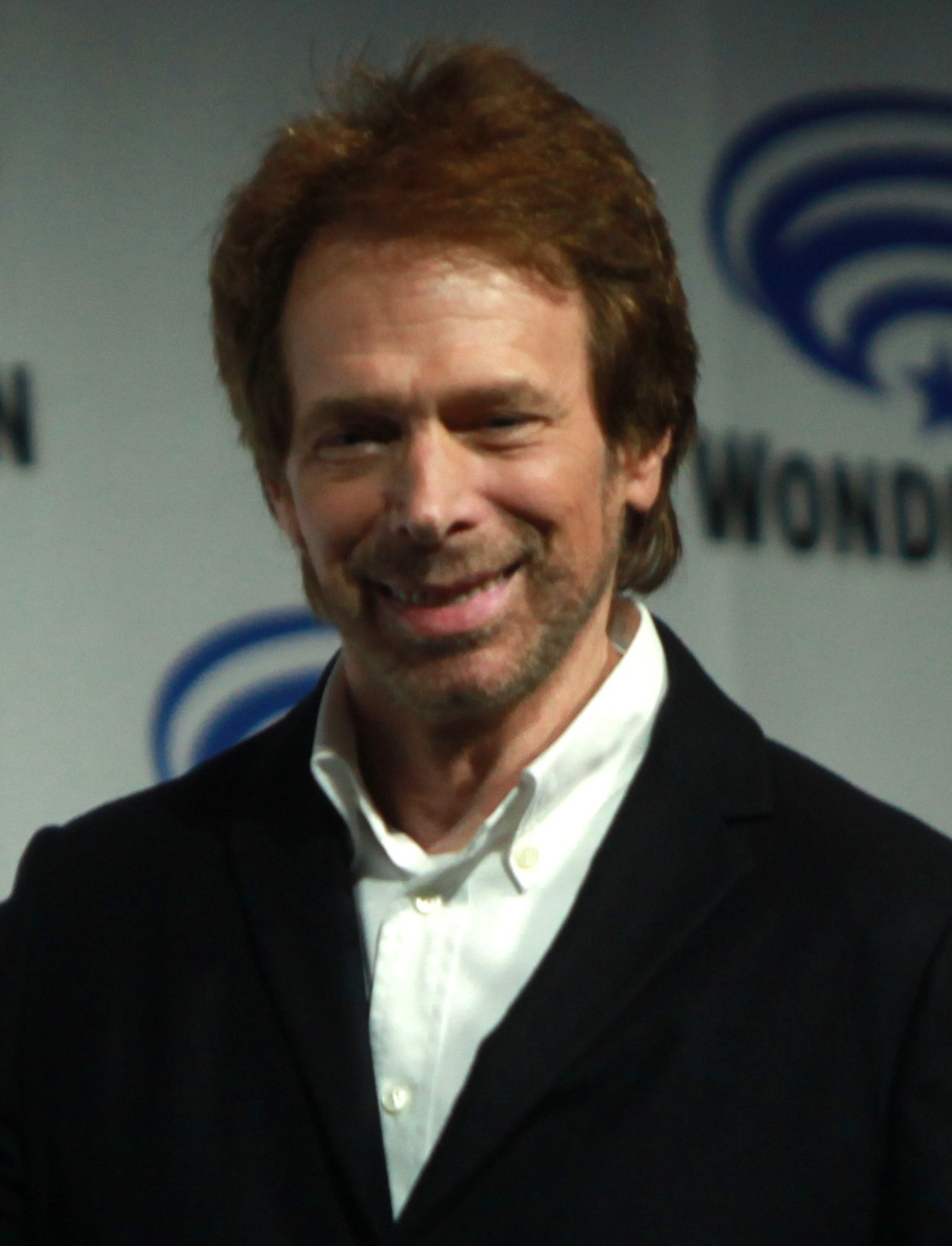
Bruckheimer at the 2014 WonderCon

Bruckheimer has been married twice. His first wife was Bonnie Fishman Bruckheimer from 1969 until 1974. He resides in Los Angeles with his second wife, novelist Linda Cobb Bruckheimer whom he married in 1993. He has one stepdaughter. The couple own a farm in Bloomfield, Kentucky, about 20 miles (32 km) southeast of Louisville, as well as another in Ojai, east of Santa Barbara.

When asked about his favorite films, Bruckheimer named The Godfather (1972), The French Connection (1971), Good Will Hunting (1997) and The 400 Blows (1959).

In May 2006, he was honored with a Doctorate of Fine Arts degree (DFA) from the University of Arizona's College of Fine Arts.

=== Philanthropic activities ===
Bruckheimer's philanthropic activities have included publicly supporting the fight against multiple sclerosis via his work with The Nancy Davis Foundation for MS. Additionally, throughout his career, he has pledged to help various causes by establishing the Jerry Bruckheimer Foundation. According to The Smoking Gun, however, the last time the Jerry Bruckheimer Foundation made a contribution was in 1995, when it gave $9,350 to Van Nuys Prep School.

Bruckheimer has aided in the repair and restoration of the historic clipper ship, Cutty Sark. A collection of photos taken by Bruckheimer went on display in London in November 2007 to help raise money for the Cutty Sark Conservation Project. The exhibition featured more than thirty pictures taken on set during the filming of Pirates of the Caribbean: At World's End.

=== Political contributions ===
Bruckheimer has donated more than $50,000 to Republican campaigns and committees. He donated funds to John McCain's 2008 presidential election campaign. He gave $5,000 to a joint fundraising committee on John McCain's behalf. He donated $25,000 to the 2012 Mitt Romney Victory Fund.

== Filmography ==
=== Film ===
==== Paramount Pictures ====
Year	Title	Director	Notes
1980	American Gigolo	Paul Schrader	
1983	Flashdance	Adrian Lyne	
1984	Beverly Hills Cop	Martin Brest	
1984	Thief of Hearts	Douglas Day Stewart	
1986	Top Gun	Tony Scott	
1987	Beverly Hills Cop II	Tony Scott	also executive soundtrack producer
1990	Days of Thunder	Tony Scott	
2019	Gemini Man	Ang Lee	
2022	Top Gun: Maverick	Joseph Kosinski	
2022	Secret Headquarters	Henry Joost; Ariel Schulman	Via Paramount+

==== Walt Disney Studios Motion Pictures ====
Year	Title	Director	Notes
1994	The Ref	Ted Demme	Executive producer
1995	Crimson Tide	Tony Scott	
1995	Dangerous Minds	John N. Smith	
1996	The Rock	Michael Bay	
1997	Con Air	Simon West	
1998	Armageddon	Michael Bay	
1998	Enemy of the State	Tony Scott	
2000	Coyote Ugly	David McNally	
2000	Gone in 60 Seconds	Dominic Sena	
2000	Remember the Titans	Boaz Yakin	
2001	Pearl Harbor	Michael Bay	
2002	Bad Company	Joel Schumacher	
2003	Pirates of the Caribbean: The Curse of the Black Pearl	Gore Verbinski	
2003	Veronica Guerin	Joel Schumacher	
2004	King Arthur	Antoine Fuqua	
2004	National Treasure	Jon Turteltaub	
2006	Déjà Vu	Tony Scott	
2006	Glory Road	James Gartner	
2006	Pirates of the Caribbean: Dead Man's Chest	Gore Verbinski	
2007	National Treasure: Book of Secrets	Jon Turteltaub	
2007	Pirates of the Caribbean: At World's End	Gore Verbinski	
2009	Confessions of a Shopaholic	P. J. Hogan	
2009	G-Force	Hoyt Yeatman	
2010	Prince of Persia: The Sands of Time	Mike Newell	
2010	The Sorcerer's Apprentice	Jon Turteltaub	
2011	Pirates of the Caribbean: On Stranger Tides	Rob Marshall	
2013	The Lone Ranger	Gore Verbinski	
2017	Pirates of the Caribbean: Dead Men Tell No Tales	Joachim Rønning; Espen Sandberg	
2024	Young Woman and the Sea	Joachim Rønning	

==== Sony Pictures Releasing ====
Year	Title	Director
1977	March or Die	Dick Richards
1995	Bad Boys	Michael Bay
2002	Black Hawk Down	Ridley Scott
2003	Bad Boys II	Michael Bay
2014	Deliver Us from Evil	Scott Derrickson
2020	Bad Boys for Life	Adil El Arbi; Bilall Fallah
2024	Bad Boys: Ride or Die	Adil El Arbi; Bilall Fallah

==== Warner Bros. ====
Year	Title	Director	Notes
1975	Rafferty and the Gold Dust Twins	Dick Richards	Associate producer
2003	Kangaroo Jack	David McNally	
2018	12 Strong	Nicolai Fuglsig	With Alcon Entertainment and Black Label Media; released by Lionsgate internationally
2025	F1	Joseph Kosinski	With Apple TV

==== Others ====
Year	Title	Director	Distribution	Notes
1972	The Culpepper Cattle Co.	Dick Richards	20th Century Fox	Associate producer
1975	Farewell, My Lovely	Dick Richards	Avco Embassy Pictures	
1980	Defiance	John Flynn	American International Pictures	
1981	Thief	Michael Mann	United Artists	
1982	Cat People	Paul Schrader	Universal Pictures	Executive producer
1982	Young Doctors in Love	Garry Marshall	20th Century Fox	
2024	The Ministry of Ungentlemanly Warfare	Guy Ritchie	Lionsgate	
2024	Beverly Hills Cop: Axel F	Mark Molloy	Netflix	
2025	Hans Zimmer & Friends: Diamond in the Desert	Paul Dugdale	Trafalgar Releasing	Executive producer

=== Television ===
Co-producer

- Fearless (2004)
- Take the Money and Run (2011)

Executive producer

Year	Title	Notes	Ref.
1996–97	Dangerous Minds		
1998–99	Soldier of Fortune, Inc.		
1998	Max Q	TV films	
1999	Swing Vote	TV films	
2000–15	CSI: Crime Scene Investigation		
2001–present	The Amazing Race		
2002–09	Without a Trace		
2002–12	CSI: Miami		
2002–03	The Legacy		
2003	Profiles from the Front Line		
2003–04	Skin		
2003–10	Cold Case		
2004–13	CSI: NY		
2005–06	Just Legal		
2005–06	E-Ring		
2005–07	Close to Home		
2006	Modern Men		
2006–07	Justice		
2008–09	Eleventh Hour		
2009–10	The Forgotten		
2009–10	Dark Blue		
2010	Miami Medical		
2010–11	Chase		
2010–11	The Whole Truth		
2013–14	Hostages		
2015–16	CSI: Cyber		
2016–21	Lucifer		
2017	Training Day		
2020	Council of Dads		
2020–2024	Hightown		
2021–2024	CSI: Vegas	A sequel of CSI: Crime Scene Investigation	
2021	Cocaine Cowboys	Inspired by the 2006 Cocaine Cowboys documentary	
2022–present	Fire Country		
2022	American Gigolo		
2022–2023	National Treasure: Edge of History		
2024	The Real CSI: Miami		
2025–present	Sheriff Country		
2025–present	Boston Blue		

== Honors and awards ==
- 1998: ShoWest Producer of the Year Award
- 2000: Producers Guild of America
- 2000: David O. Selznick Award for Lifetime Achievement
- 2003: "No. 1 most-powerful person in Hollywood" by Entertainment Weekly
- 2003–2009, 2011–2012, 2014: Primetime Emmy Award for Outstanding Reality Competition Program for The Amazing Race
- 2006: #10 on Premiere's "Power 50" list
- 2013: Star on the Hollywood Walk of Fame, placed right by El Capitan Theatre on Hollywood Boulevard.
- 2026: Made a Disney Legend on D23, the official Disney fan website

His productions collected the following:

- Academy Award: 52 nominations, 8 wins
- Grammy Award: 8 nominations, 5 wins
- Golden Globe: 23 nominations, 4 wins
- Emmy Award: 77 nominations, 17 wins
- Peabody Award for Visionary
- People's Choice Awards: 8 nominations, 4 wins
