= On the Double (film) =

1961 film by Melville Shavelson

- 1961 movie poster
- Directed by: Melville Shavelson
- Written by: Melville Shavelson; Jack Rose
- Produced by: Jack Rose
- Starring: Danny Kaye; Dana Wynter; Wilfrid Hyde-White; Margaret Rutherford; Diana Dors
- Cinematography: Harry Stradling
- Edited by: Frank Bracht
- Music by: Leith Stevens
- Production company: Dena-Capri Productions
- Distributed by: Paramount Pictures
- Release date: May 19, 1961
- Running time: 92 min
- Country: United States
- Language: English
- Box office: $1,650,000

On the Double is a 1961 American comedy film, directed by Melville Shavelson, who also wrote the screenplay with Jack Rose. It stars Danny Kaye who plays, as in many of his films, two roles — in this case, an American soldier and a British General.

== Plot ==
England, 1944. An attempt on the life of British high commander General Sir Lawrence MacKenzie-Smith by German intelligence, a chief strategist for the planned invasion of mainland Europe, spurs a search for a lookalike to impersonate him. American Pvt. Ernie Williams, a talented mimic who bears a remarkable resemblance to MacKenzie-Smith, is selected for the ruse. When Ernie is presented to MacKenzie-Smith as his proposed double, the General, after initial reservation, agrees to the plan. However, the most vital detail – that Ernie will serve as a decoy target for German intelligence – is conveniently withheld from him.

The situation gradually unravels when Lady Margaret, MacKenzie-Smith's wife, returns prematurely from a war bond tour in Canada to divorce him, having tired of his neglect and his womanizing. Lady Margaret quickly recognizes Ernie as an impostor; but out of necessity, she is made familiar with the situation. Taking pity on Ernie, she tells him intimate details about MacKenzie-Smith which will help complement his disguise, and gradually they fall in love with each other.

However, German intelligence continues its liquidation attempts. When Ernie tries to resign from the project, he and Margaret learn that a plane MacKenzie-Smith was travelling on was shot down, with all hands lost, thus forcing Ernie to carry on the charade. However, after a wild regimental party, he is kidnapped by one of MacKenzie-Smith's mistresses and a traitorous officer, both Nazi agents, and is then flown to Berlin and interrogated about the Allies' plans for invading France. Unable to convince his captors that he's a decoy and not the real MacKenzie-Smith, Ernie then blabs about non-existent invasion plots, which the Germans take as truth. Once left alone, Ernie acquires a list of German agents in Britain and facilitates his escape from German Headquarters.

After a comedy of errors in a Berlin cabaret, Ernie disguises himself as a Luftwaffe pilot and boards a bomber bound for England, where he manages to parachute out. Captured, he is brought to General Wiffingham, a friend of MacKenzie-Smith, but as he reads him the names on his list, Ernie discovers to his dismay that Wiffingham is the chief Nazi infiltrator within the British Secret Service. In the end, Ernie is rescued before Wiffingham can have him silenced via summary execution firing squad for espionage. The invasion proceeds smoothly, and Margaret and Ernie, reunited in London, confess their love for each other.

== Cast ==
- Danny Kaye as Private First Class Ernie Williams / General Sir Lawrence MacKenzie-Smith
- Dana Wynter as Lady Margaret MacKenzie-Smith
- Wilfrid Hyde-White as Colonel Somerset
- Margaret Rutherford as Lady Vivian
- Diana Dors as Sergeant Bridget Stanhope
- Allan Cuthbertson as Captain Patterson
- Jesse White as Corporal Joseph Praeger
- Gregory Walcott as Colonel Rock Houston
- Terence De Marney as Sergeant Colin Twickenham
- Rex Evans as General Carleton Brown Wiffingham
- Rudolph Anders as Oberkommandant
- Edgar Barrier as Blankmeister
- Ben Astar as General Zlinkov
- Bobby Watson as Adolf Hitler

== Production ==
After making The Five Pennies Danny Kaye, Mel Shalvelson and Jack Rose decided they wanted to make a straight comedy, "a picture that had no message at all."

Background filming took place in London in August 1960. Dana Wynter was borrowed from 20th Century Fox. The movie started shooting in Los Angeles in November. Diana Dors had recently relocated to Hollywood.

== Critical reception ==
Despite finding script and direction "below par," the Radio Times opined "Most Kaye movies have their moments, and there are a few good laughs"; whereas DVD Talk thought it "acceptable fun for fans of Danny Kaye, yet it plays like something made ten years earlier." Allmovie however, noted a "lively WW II-era comedy."
