= Greg Bautzer =

American lawyer

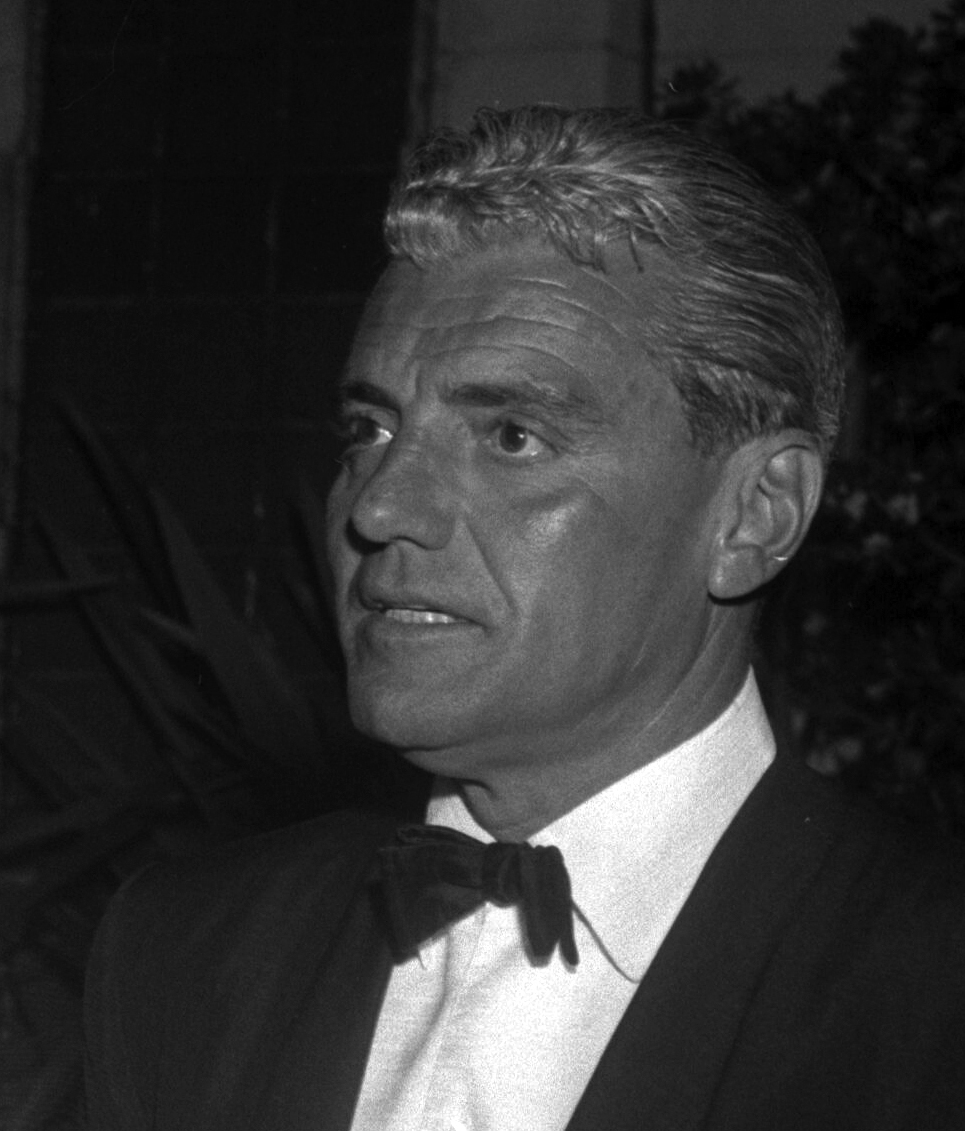
- Bautzer in 1958
- Born: Gregson Edward Bautzer; April 3, 1911; San Pedro, California, U.S.
- Died: October 26, 1987 (aged 76); Beverly Hills, California, U.S.
- Resting place: Westwood Memorial Park
- Spouses: Marion Jahns (m. 1935; div. 1937) Buff Cobb (m. 1944; div. 1945) Dana Wynter (m. 1956; div. 1981): Nicola Dantine (m. 198?; his death 1987)
- Children: 1

Gregson Edward Bautzer (April 3, 1911 – October 26, 1987) was an American attorney who represented such individuals as Ginger Rogers, Ingrid Bergman, Joan Crawford, Kirk Kerkorian, Howard Hughes and William Wilkerson.

== Early life ==
Bautzer was born in the Los Angeles community of San Pedro, California to Edward H. Bautzer, a descendant of German immigrants, and his wife Blanche Buckhout. The elder Bautzer was active in the San Pedro community, a civic leader, political activist and attorney. Bautzer's mother, before her marriage, had been a school teacher. Bautzer's father died when he was ten years old. From a young age, Bautzer stated his intent to follow in his father's footsteps by practicing law. After his father's death, Bautzer's widowed mother returned to teaching. Bautzer contributed financially by taking after school jobs, selling newspapers, performing janitorial work on yachts harbored in San Pedro, and waiting on tables in local eateries.

Bautzer attended San Pedro High School where he was an exemplary student. A self-disciplined young man of considerable scholastic achievement, he was also endowed with a congenial, enthusiastic personality that easily attracted friendships. While in high school, Bautzer took an active interest in public speaking and while yet a teenager, gained community recognition for his debating skills. He proceeded to enter national oratorical competitions. In 1926, he took second place in the West Coast division of the National Oratorical Contest, winning two hundred fifty dollars.

In 1927, Bautzer and his mother relocated to another part of Los Angeles where she had accepted an appointment as principal of an area school. In 1928, he entered the University of Southern California (USC) on a scholarship. He became a member of the Phi Kappa Psi fraternity, the Skull and Dagger honor society, and captain of the varsity debate team. In 1930, he was honored by being selected as one of three university students to be on the All California Collegiate Debate team. Bautzer graduated with a bachelor's degree from USC in June 1932. Before continuing his education at USC Law School, he took a year off from his studies to work and save money. He obtained his law degree in 1936.

== Personal life ==
While attending law school, Bautzer met socialite Marion Jahns; they married on January 2, 1935 and divorced in 1937. From 1938 to 1941, he owned a home at 1764 Prospect Drive in the Laurel Canyon area of Los Angeles. After becoming established in Hollywood, Bautzer was engaged to actresses Barbara Payton, Dorothy Lamour and Lana Turner. Turner was only 16 when she and Bautzer started to date. He had another brief marriage to actress Buff Cobb, but the couple divorced after six months.

Bautzer's best known romance was with actress Joan Crawford. Their four-year relationship was reportedly on and off, as well as publicly heated at times, with Bautzer seen by many as Crawford's "escort".

On June 10, 1956, Bautzer married actress Dana Wynter. They had one son, Mark Ragan Bautzer. The couple divorced in 1981.

The last of Bautzer's four wives, and his surviving widow, was Nicola Schenck Dantine, the daughter of film mogul Nicholas Schenck and an actress also known as Niki Dantine.

== Death ==
Bautzer died of heart failure at his Beverly Hills home on October 26, 1987, at the age of 76. He is interred at Westwood Memorial Park.

== See also ==
- Ernest Del
