= Ernest Del =

American entertainment attorney

- Born: January 16, 1952 (age 74); Santa Monica, California, U.S.
- Education: University of California, Berkeley; Stanford Law School (JD)
- Known for: President of ZeniMax Media attorney at Del, Shaw, Moonves, Tanaka, Finkelstein & Lezcano
- Spouse: Danielle Del
- Children: 4

Ernest Del (born January 16, 1952) is an American entertainment attorney. Del served as Senior Advisor at ZeniMax Media from 2017 till 2021. Del previously served as President of ZeniMax from 1999 up until April 2017. He also serves as a director of Delivery Agent and of the Silver Eagle Acquisition Corporation.

== Education ==
Del graduated with degrees in economics and political science from the University of California, Berkeley in 1973 and earned his J.D. degree from Stanford University Law School in 1976.

== Career ==
Del began his law career in 1976 as an antitrust litigator at the law firm of Wyman, Bautzer, Rothman & Kuchel, focused primarily on cases addressing the transformation of the nationwide Bell telephone system in the late 1970s before shifting to transactional entertainment law. Initially he worked exclusively on feature films in the United States and abroad. He later worked on television and digital media. In December 1999, he became President at ZeniMax Media. He additionally served as president of ZeniMax Europe from December 2010 to August 2012. Del later became part of the law firm Del, Shaw, Moonves, Tanaka, Finkelstein & Lezcano.

== Entertainment law ==
Del's clients include: Fox's former executive and current CEO of Tribune Company, Peter Liguori, Kevin Reilly (Chairman of Entertainment for the Fox Broadcasting Company), Former CW executive Dawn Ostroff, 20th TV's Dana Walden, Lionsgate CEO Jon Feltheimer, former The WB Television Network network president David Janollari, Leslie Moonves ( former president and CEO, CBS Corporation), actor-producer Paul Reiser, Stuart Bloomberg the former chairman of ABC Entertainment, Bob Greenblatt (chairman of NBC Entertainment). Some of his associates from Hollywood sat on ZeniMax's Board of Directors: Leslie Moonves, Harry Sloan and Jerry Bruckheimer.

Del helped Harry E. Sloan to rebuild MGM, when Sloan was chairman and CEO there. He also repped Providence Equity Partners in the creation of Hulu, as well as advising Bethesda Softworks. In 2009 and 2010, Del was called a power lawyer by The Hollywood Reporter.

== See also ==
- Greg Bautzer
