= National Register of Historic Places listings in Washington County, Kentucky =

Location of Washington County in Kentucky

This is a list of the National Register of Historic Places listings in Washington County, Kentucky.

This is intended to be a complete list of the properties and districts on the National Register of Historic Places in Washington County, Kentucky, United States. The locations of National Register properties and districts for which the latitude and longitude coordinates are included below, may be seen in a map.

There are 68 properties and districts listed on the National Register in the county.

This National Park Service list is complete through NPS recent listings posted May 1, 2026.

== Current listings ==
	Name on the Register	Image	Date listed	Location	City or town	Description
1	John R. Barber House		February 10, 1989 (#88003423)	West of Springfield on U.S. Route 150; 37°42′49″N 85°15′50″W	Springfield	
2	Beech Fork Bridge, Mackville Road		February 10, 1989 (#88003429)	East of Springfield on Kentucky Route 152; 37°42′15″N 85°08′46″W	Springfield	Has been replaced
3	Beechfork Presbyterian Church		February 10, 1989 (#88003406)	North of Springfield off Kentucky Route 55; 37°45′14″N 85°10′30″W	Springfield	
4	Richard Berry Jr. House		February 10, 1989 (#88003400)	North of Springfield on Kentucky Route 438; 37°46′10″N 85°11′33″W	Springfield	
5	William Blackwell House	William Blackwell House	February 10, 1989 (#88003391)	138 Lebanon Hill; 37°40′55″N 85°13′28″W	Springfield	
6	Stephen Cooke Brown House		November 21, 1994 (#88003471)	Kentucky Route 438; 37°45′40″N 85°10′20″W	Springfield	
7	William Caldwell Kitchen		October 6, 1987 (#87002054)	Off Kentucky Route 55 on Spaulding Lane; 37°43′03″N 85°10′50″W	Springfield	
8	Cartwright Creek Bridge		February 10, 1989 (#88003425)	West of Springfield on Booker Rd. 37°39′34″N 85°16′23″W	Springfield	
9	Clements House		February 10, 1989 (#88003401)	West of Springfield on U.S. Route 150; 37°42′15″N 85°15′11″W	Springfield	
10	Cocanougher House		February 10, 1989 (#88003413)	Off U.S. Route 150; 37°39′27″N 85°06′07″W	Mackville	
11	George Conner House		February 10, 1989 (#88003402)	Off U.S. Route 150; 37°45′35″N 85°20′38″W	Fredericktown	
12	Covington Institute Teachers' Residence	Covington Institute Teachers' Residence	January 27, 1983 (#83002890)	333 E. Main St. 37°41′00″N 85°13′00″W	Springfield	
13	Ed Cusick House		February 10, 1989 (#88003426)	West of Springfield on Bearwallow Rd. 37°42′59″N 85°21′59″W	Springfield	
14	Doe Run Trestle	Doe Run Trestle	February 10, 1989 (#88003418)	West of Springfield off U.S. Route 150; 37°46′40″N 85°17′40″W	Springfield	No longer standing.
15	Duncan House	Duncan House	February 10, 1989 (#88003393)	206 Lincoln Park Rd. 37°41′11″N 85°13′18″W	Springfield	
16	Edelen House		February 10, 1989 (#88003433)	Highway 1183; 37°42′52″N 85°23′15″W	Springfield	
17	Elmwood		December 20, 1977 (#77000658)	Kentucky Route 55; 37°40′41″N 85°13′35″W	Springfield	
18	Farmer's Bank of Mackville	Farmer's Bank of Mackville	February 10, 1989 (#88003431)	Kentucky Route 152; 37°43′41″N 85°04′00″W	Mackville	
19	Fields' House		February 10, 1989 (#88003422)	Highway 1183; 37°42′13″N 85°19′06″W	Springfield	
20	Glenn Cottage Tract		February 10, 1989 (#88003416)	Kentucky Route 55; 37°49′07″N 85°17′38″W	Maud	
21	Gregory-Barlow Place		February 10, 1989 (#88003398)	South of Mooresville off Kentucky Route 55; 37°46′54″N 85°15′42″W	Mooresville	
22	Grundy Houses		January 17, 1978 (#78001411)	North of Springfield off Kentucky Route 55; 37°44′53″N 85°16′39″W	Springfield	
23	Hamilton Farm		July 22, 1993 (#93000695)	U.S. Route 150 0.7 miles west of Parker's Branch crossing 37°45′56″N 85°19′23″W	Springfield	
24	Thomas H. Hamilton House		February 10, 1989 (#88003403)	West of Springfield on U.S. Route 150; 37°42′56″N 85°16′11″W	Springfield	
25	Hatchett Tobacco Barn		February 7, 2008 (#08000013)	3067 Beechland Rd. 37°45′58″N 85°12′32″W	Springfield	
26	Holy Rosary Church	Holy Rosary Church	February 10, 1989 (#88003409)	Kentucky Route 1183; 37°42′47″N 85°23′15″W	Manton	
27	Johnson's Chapel AME Church	Johnson's Chapel AME Church	February 10, 1989 (#88003396)	E. High St. 37°41′04″N 85°13′00″W	Springfield	
28	Kalarama Saddlebred Horse Farm		August 5, 2010 (#10000528)	101 Kalarama Dr. 37°41′42″N 85°12′27″W	Springfield	
29	Kendrick-Croake House	Kendrick-Croake House	February 10, 1989 (#88003417)	Hog Run, Booker Station; 37°46′49″N 85°18′09″W	Maud	
30	Kendrick-Tucker-Barber House	Kendrick-Tucker-Barber House	February 10, 1989 (#88003421)	Off U.S. Route 150; 37°45′56″N 85°18′36″W	Mooresville	
31	Mordecai Lincoln House	Mordecai Lincoln House	August 21, 1972 (#72000547)	5.9 miles north of Springfield on Kentucky Route 528; 37°44′54″N 85°12′35″W	Springfield	
32	John Litsey House		February 10, 1989 (#88003404)	North of Springfield off Kentucky Route 438; 37°46′24″N 85°12′45″W	Springfield	
33	Long Lick Creek Bridge		February 10, 1989 (#88003414)	Hardesty-Polin Rd. over Long Lick Creek; 37°48′38″N 85°12′45″W	Willisburg	
34	Pat Lyddan House		February 10, 1989 (#88003420)	South of Mooresville on Kentucky Route 55; 37°47′26″N 85°15′27″W	Mooresville	
35	Mackville Historic District	Mackville Historic District	January 22, 2014 (#12001203)	Along Kentucky Routes 152 and 433; 37°44′13″N 85°03′59″W	Mackville	
36	Maple Grove		August 5, 2010 (#10000527)	3216 Perryville Rd. 37°39′57″N 85°10′57″W	Springfield vicinity	
37	Archibald Scott Mayes House		February 10, 1989 (#88003405)	East of Springfield off U.S. Route 150; 37°39′40″N 85°09′58″W	Springfield	
38	William C. McChord House	William C. McChord House	December 11, 1978 (#78001412)	202 Lincoln Park Rd. 37°41′09″N 85°13′18″W	Springfield	
39	T.I. McElroy House		February 10, 1989 (#88003397)	East of Springfield on U.S. Route 150; 37°39′42″N 85°11′02″W	Springfield	
40	Wilson McElroy House	Wilson McElroy House	February 10, 1989 (#88003392)	321 E. High St. 37°41′06″N 85°13′02″W	Springfield	
41	Mount Zion Covered Bridge	Mount Zion Covered Bridge	March 26, 1976 (#76000958)	North of Mooresville on Kentucky Route 458; 37°49′40″N 85°15′23″W	Mooresville	Completed 1871. Destroyed 2021.
42	Parrot House		February 10, 1989 (#88003412)	East of Springfield on Kentucky Route 152; 37°41′39″N 85°10′51″W	Springfield	
43	Benjamin Pile House		February 10, 1989 (#88003407)	Off Kentucky Route 55; 37°48′59″N 85°16′54″W	Springfield	
44	John Pope House	John Pope House	May 13, 1976 (#76000959)	207 Walnut St. 37°41′08″N 85°13′11″W	Springfield	
45	Ray-Wakefield House		February 10, 1989 (#88003415)	Off Kentucky Route 55; 37°49′12″N 85°17′28″W	Maud	
46	Road Run School		February 10, 1989 (#88003424)	West of Springfield off Kentucky Route 152; 37°40′42″N 85°21′02″W	Springfield	
47	Round Stone Smokehouse		January 8, 1987 (#87000164)	U.S. Route 150; 37°45′32″N 85°18′55″W	Fredericktown	
48	St. Catherine of Sienna Convent		February 10, 1989 (#88003395)	West of Springfield on U.S. Route 150; 37°42′29″N 85°15′38″W	Springfield	
49	St. Dominic's Catholic Church	St. Dominic's Catholic Church	February 10, 1989 (#88003388)	Main St. 37°41′14″N 85°13′30″W	Springfield	
50	St. Rose Roman Catholic Church Complex	St. Rose Roman Catholic Church Complex	February 14, 1978 (#78001413)	West of Springfield off U.S. Route 150; 37°41′36″N 85°15′49″W	Springfield	
51	Simms-Edelen House		February 10, 1989 (#88003427)	Southeast of Springfield; 37°38′05″N 85°10′39″W	Springfield	
52	Simms-Mattingly House		February 10, 1989 (#88003428)	East of Springfield off Kentucky Route 152; 37°42′11″N 85°09′52″W	Springfield	
53	Simmstown	Simmstown	February 10, 1989 (#88003408)	South of Springfield on Rineltown-Simmstown Rd. 37°38′05″N 85°11′08″W	Springfield	
54	Levi J. Smith House		February 10, 1989 (#88003411)	West of Springfield on U.S. Route 150; 37°41′58″N 85°15′02″W	Springfield	
55	Springfield Armory	Springfield Armory	March 24, 2000 (#00000283)	126 Armory Hill Rd. 37°40′57″N 85°13′33″W	Springfield	
56	Springfield Baptist Church	Springfield Baptist Church	February 10, 1989 (#88003394)	Lincoln Park Rd. 37°41′11″N 85°13′15″W	Springfield	
57	Springfield Graded School	Springfield Graded School	February 10, 1989 (#88003389)	Mackville and Perry Rds. 37°40′55″N 85°12′52″W	Springfield	
58	Springfield Main Street Historic District	Springfield Main Street Historic District	February 10, 1989 (#88003434)	Roughly bounded by McCord, Walnut, Ballard and Doctor Sts.; also roughly Commercial Ave. to College St., and McCord and High Sts. to E. Depot St. 37°41′07″N 85°13′19″W	Springfield	Originally the Springfield Historic Commercial District, a small downtown district; second set of addresses represent a boundary increase of December 19, 2012, which included a name change and greatly expanded boundaries
59	Tatham Springs		February 10, 1989 (#88003399)	North of Willisburg on Hwy. 1796; 37°51′50″N 85°07′28″W	Willisburg	No longer extant.
60	John Thomas House		February 10, 1989 (#88003419)	South of Mooresville on Kentucky Route 55; 37°47′09″N 85°15′17″W	Mooresville	
61	Dr. Thompson House		February 10, 1989 (#88003430)	East of Springfield on Mackville Rd. 37°43′19″N 85°05′59″W	Springfield	
62	S.F. Turner and Company Steam Flouring and Grist Mill	S.F. Turner and Company Steam Flouring and Grist Mill	February 10, 1989 (#88003390)	400 W. Main St. 37°41′19″N 85°13′46″W	Springfield	
63	Walnut Street Historic District	Walnut Street Historic District	February 10, 1989 (#88003435)	200-600 blocks of Walnut St. 37°41′12″N 85°13′10″W	Springfield	
64	Walton Manor Cottage		August 24, 1977 (#77000659)	2 miles west of Springfield on Kentucky Route 150; 37°42′13″N 85°15′14″W	Springfield	
65	Washington County Courthouse	Washington County Courthouse	July 25, 1977 (#77000660)	Public Sq., Main at Lincoln Park Rd. 37°41′06″N 85°13′16″W	Springfield	Two-story brick courthouse built in 1815, with an octagonal cupola added in 1840. Included in Springfield Main Street Historic District.
66	Thomas H. Williams House		February 10, 1989 (#88003410)	Hardesty Rd. 37°48′00″N 85°12′41″W	Springfield	
67	Willisburg Central Bank and Post Office	Willisburg Central Bank and Post Office	February 10, 1989 (#88003432)	Kentucky Route 53; 37°48′30″N 85°07′29″W	Willisburg	
68	Willisburg Historic District	Willisburg Historic District	January 22, 2014 (#12001204)	Along Kentucky Routes 53 and 433; 37°48′27″N 85°07′25″W	Willisburg	

== See also ==
- List of National Historic Landmarks in Kentucky
- National Register of Historic Places listings in Kentucky
