= Cartwright Creek Bridge =

- U.S. National Register of Historic Places
- Location: Booker Rd., west of Springfield, Kentucky
- Coordinates: 37°39′34″N 85°16′23″W
- Area: less than one acre
- Built: 1884
- Built by: King Iron Bridge Co.
- Architectural style: Single span metal truss
- MPS: Washington County MRA
- NRHP reference No.: 88003425
- Added to NRHP: February 10, 1989

The Cartwright Creek Bridge near Springfield, Kentucky is a metal truss bridge built in 1884. It was listed on the National Register of Historic Places in 1989.

It is a single-span bridge built by the King Iron Bridge Company. It crosses Cartwright Creek, a tributary to the Beech Fork of the Salt River. It was deemed significant as one of few truss bridges in Washington County surviving from the late 1800s.

== See also ==
- Beech Fork Bridge, Mackville Road nearby bridge also built by King Iron Bridge Co.
- National Register of Historic Places listings in Washington County, Kentucky
