= Beech Fork Bridge, Mackville Road =

- U.S. National Register of Historic Places
- Location: kentucky Route 152, east of Springfield, Kentucky
- Coordinates: 37°42′15″N 85°08′46″W
- Area: less than one acre
- Built: 1884
- Built by: King Iron Bridge Co.
- Architectural style: Pratt thru truss
- MPS: Washington County MRA
- NRHP reference No.: 88003429
- Added to NRHP: February 10, 1989

Beech Fork Bridge, Mackville Road, near Springfield, Kentucky, was a Pratt truss bridge which was built in 1884. It was built by the King Iron Bridge Co. and crosses the Beech Fork of the Salt River. It was listed on the National Register of Historic Places in 1989.

It was then one of only eight King bridges surviving statewide.

It has an eight panel Pratt truss design, rests on cut stone abutments, and is 124 feet (38 m) long. It brings a 15.5 feet (4.7 m) wide roadway over Beech Fork.

The bridge has since been replaced.

== See also ==
- Cartwright Creek Bridge nearby bridge also built by King Iron Bridge Co.
- National Register of Historic Places listings in Washington County, Kentucky
