= Beechfork Presbyterian Church =

Historic church in Kentucky, United States

- U.S. National Register of Historic Places
- Location within Kentucky Location within the United States
- Nearest city: Springfield, Kentucky
- Coordinates: 37°45′14″N 85°10′30″W
- Area: 4 acres (1.6 ha)
- Built: 1836
- Architectural style: Romanesque, Gothic Revival
- MPS: Washington County MRA
- NRHP reference No.: 88003406
- Added to NRHP: February 10, 1989

Beechfork Presbyterian Church (also Pleasant Grove Presbyterian Church) is a historic church near Springfield, Kentucky.

The church was built in 1836 by a Presbyterian congregation that had organized three years earlier, made up of families centered along the Beech Fork north of Springfield. It was renamed Pleasant Grove Presbyterian Church c. 1843-1844. The building is a brick nave plan church, the original facade is laid in Flemish bond. An 1889-1900 renovation added a Gothic vestibule to the front and Gothic arched windows.

The building and the adjoining cemetery were added to the National Register of Historic Places in 1989.
