= Farmer's Bank of Mackville =

- U.S. National Register of Historic Places
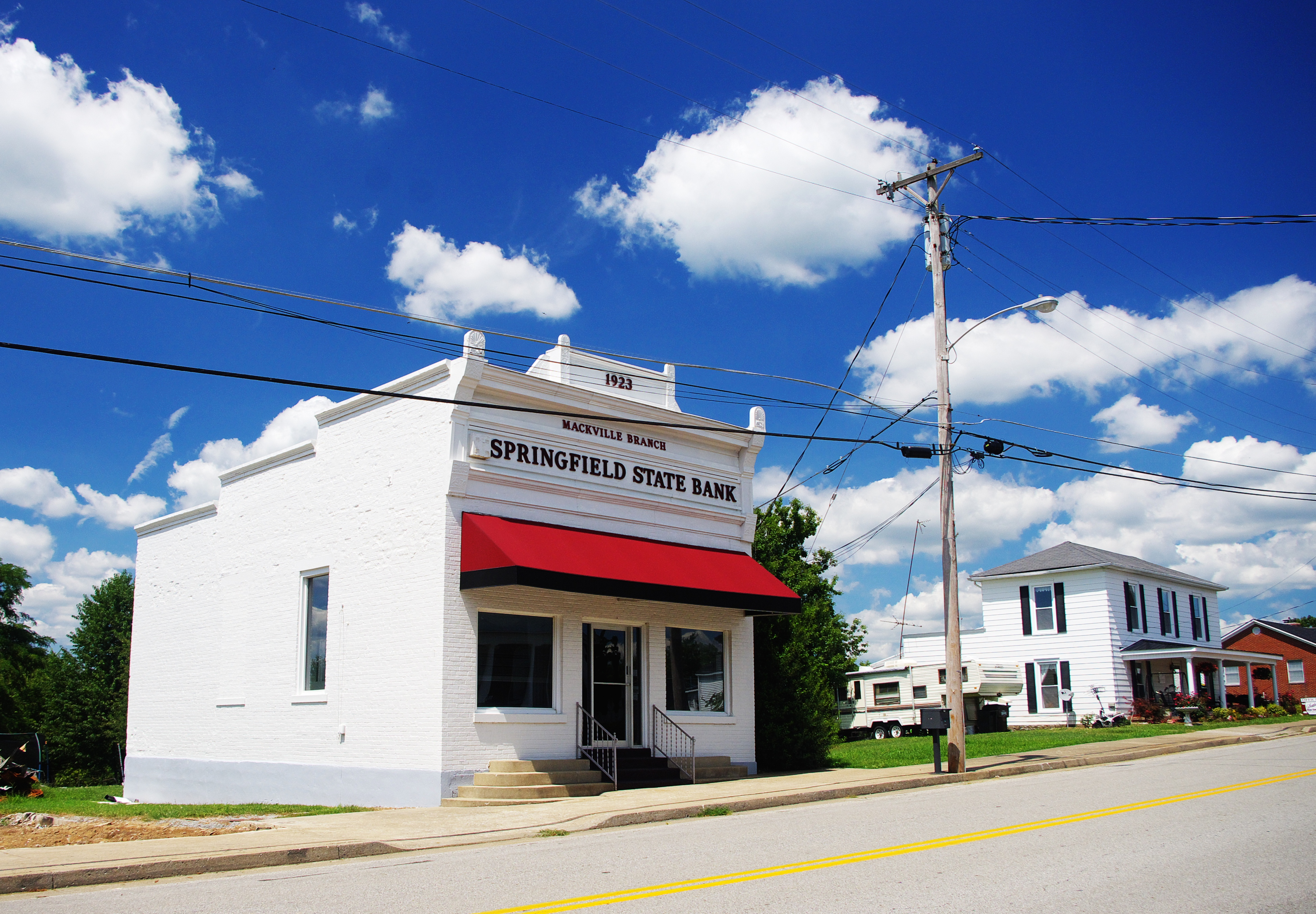

- Location within Kentucky Location within the United States
- Location: KY 152, Mackville, Kentucky
- Coordinates: 37°43′41″N 85°04′00″W
- Area: less than one acre
- Built: 1923
- Architectural style: Italianate
- MPS: Washington County MRA
- NRHP reference No.: 88003431
- Added to NRHP: February 10, 1989

The Farmer's Bank of Mackville, on Kentucky Route 152 in Mackville, Kentucky, was built in 1923. It was later known as Springfield State Bank. It was listed on the National Register of Historic Places in 1989.

It was deemed notable as a "Well-preserved example of major commercial structure in Mackville reflecting importance of local commercial institutions in rural Washington County at the turn of the [20th] century."
