= Pat Lyddan House =

Historic house in Kentucky, United States

- U.S. National Register of Historic Places
- Location within Kentucky Location within the United States
- Location: On Kentucky Route 55 south of Mooresville, Kentucky
- Coordinates: 37°47′26″N 85°15′27″W
- Area: 0.2 acres (0.081 ha)
- Built: 1853
- Architectural style: Greek Revival
- MPS: Washington County MRA
- NRHP reference No.: 88003420
- Added to NRHP: February 10, 1989

The Pat Lyddan House, located south of Mooresville, Kentucky on Kentucky Route 55, was built in 1853. It was listed on the National Register of Historic Places in 1989.

It is a three-bay, two-story, log house built by Pat Lyddan with elements of Greek Revival style (in the recessed central entrance with sidelights, transom, pilasters, and architrave).

It has also been known as the Ed Yocum Place.
