= St. Dominic's Catholic Church =

Historic church in Kentucky, United States

- St. Dominic Catholic Church
- U.S. National Register of Historic Places
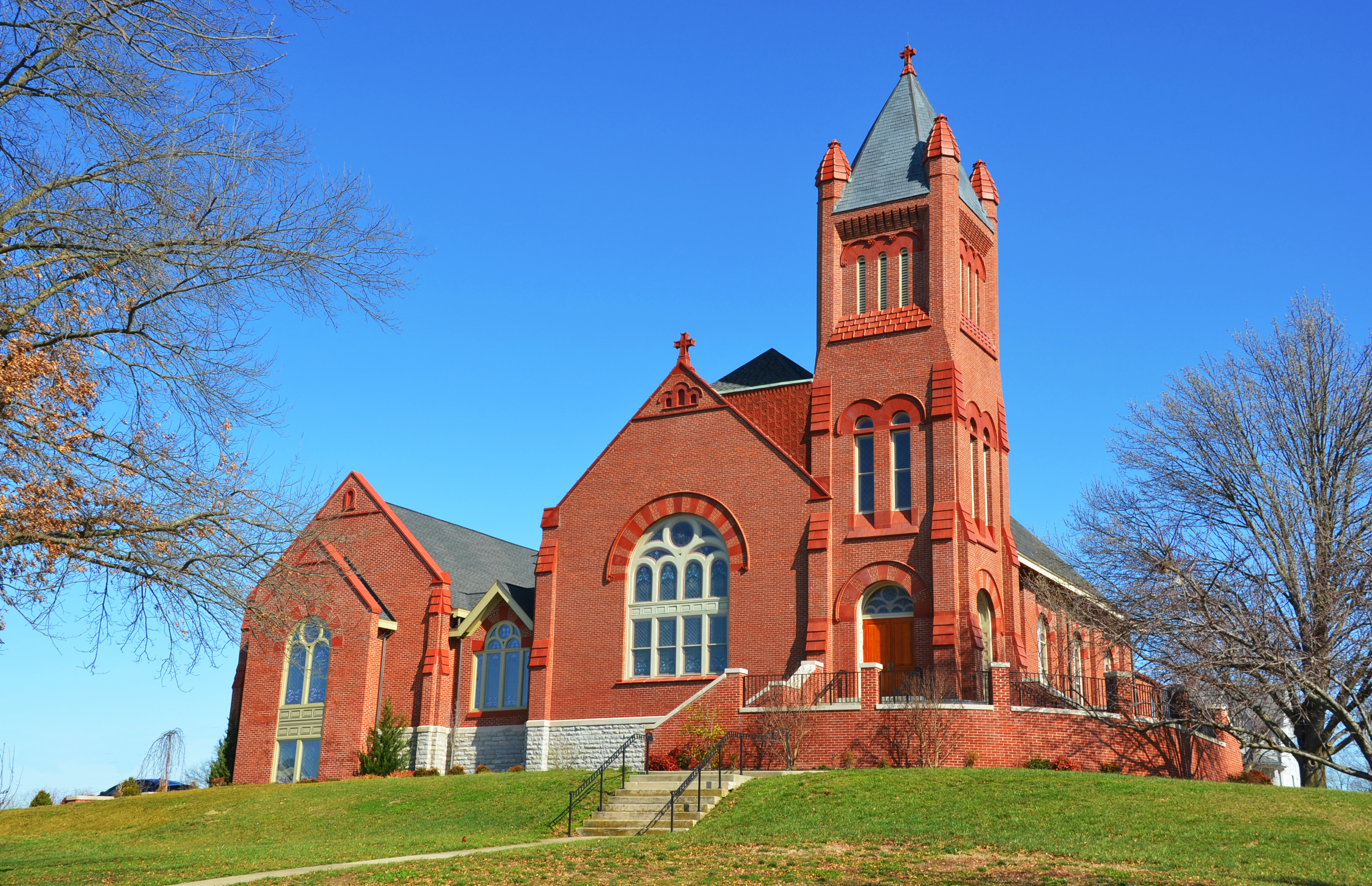
- Saint Dominic Catholic Church, built in 1890 and added to the National Register in 1989.

- Location within Kentucky Location within the United States
- Location: 303 W. Main St., Springfield, Kentucky
- Coordinates: 37°41′14″N 85°13′30″W
- Area: less than one acre
- Built: 1890
- Architectural style: Romanesque Revival
- MPS: Washington County MRA
- NRHP reference No.: 88003388
- Added to NRHP: February 10, 1989

St. Dominic Catholic Church is a Catholic parish church of the Roman Rite on Main Street in Springfield, Kentucky, within the Archdiocese of Louisville.

The red Romanesque building was built in 1890 and added to the National Register of Historic Places in 1989. It has a pyramidal tower and roof shingled with fishscale slate. It is the parish's second church, replacing an 1843 construction.
