= Holy Rosary Church (Manton, Kentucky) =

- U.S. National Register of Historic Places
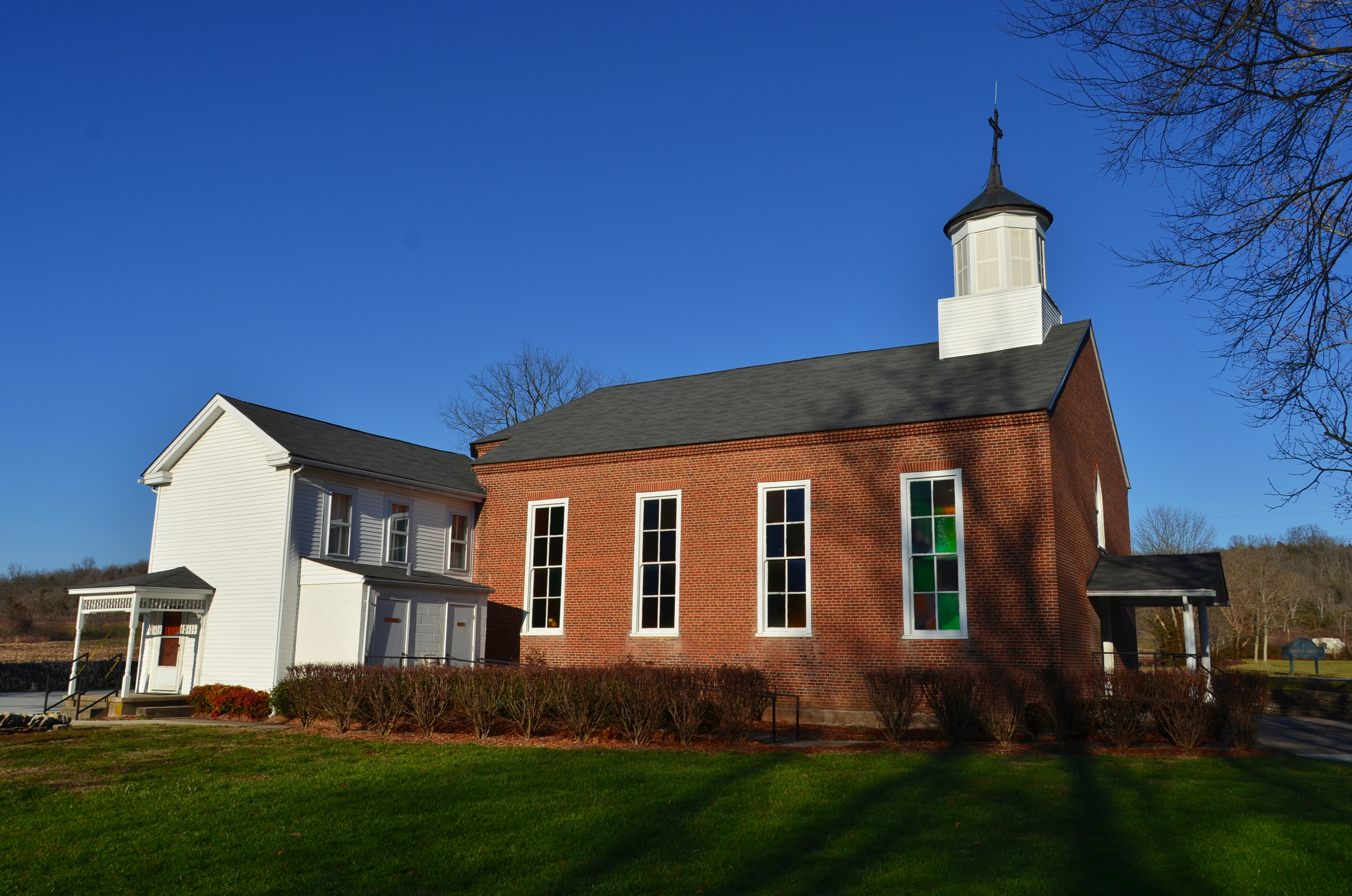
- Holy Rosary Church, 2012

- Location within Kentucky Location within the United States
- Nearest city: Springfield, Kentucky
- Coordinates: 37°42′47″N 85°23′15″W
- Area: 0.3 acres (0.12 ha)
- Built: 1844
- MPS: Washington County MRA
- NRHP reference No.: 88003409
- Added to NRHP: February 10, 1989

Holy Rosary Church was a parish erected in 1844 in the small community of Manton (also known as Blincoe) in Washington County, Kentucky, United States. The church was built under the direction of the Dominicans.

== Parish and worship space origination ==
The cornerstone for Holy Rosary Church, a Roman Catholic church in Manton was laid November 2, 1844. The original church is not the one that is on this site. A few years later, in 1848, a new church was built. This, the present building, was blessed on November 19, 1848. The building was built of brick with an overall size of 20 x 60 feet.

== Pastors ==
One of the first pastors was Rev. Julian Timoleum Pieters. Records also show Fr. Edward Lynch was an early pastor, who was stationed at Holy Cross between 1866 and 1883. The current parish administrator is Fr. Matthew Hardesty. The new and current pastor is, Fr. Michael Martin.

== The parish today ==
In 1883, a church was built at nearby Fredericktown (also known as 'the Burg'). The parish is a mission church to one at Fredericktown, Kentucky. The parish is within the Diocese of Louisville. There are about 200 parishioners.

This historic building is listed in the National Register of Historic Places.
