= St. Catherine of Sienna Convent =

Historic church in Kentucky, United States

- U.S. National Register of Historic Places
- Location within Kentucky Location within the United States
- Nearest city: Springfield, Kentucky
- Coordinates: 37°42′29″N 85°15′38″W
- Area: 11.4 acres (4.6 ha)
- Built: 1904-05
- Architect: Frank Brewer
- Architectural style: Classical Revival
- MPS: Washington County MRA
- NRHP reference No.: 88003395
- Added to NRHP: February 10, 1989

The St. Catherine of Sienna Convent is a historic convent in Springfield, Kentucky. It was built in 1904-05 and added to the National Register in 1989.

It is a three-and-a-half-story brick with stone trim building with pedimented pavilions at center and ends. It was designed by architect Frank Brewer in Classical Revival style. A chapel was added on the east side during 1922–1930.
