= Mount Zion Covered Bridge =

- U.S. National Register of Historic Places
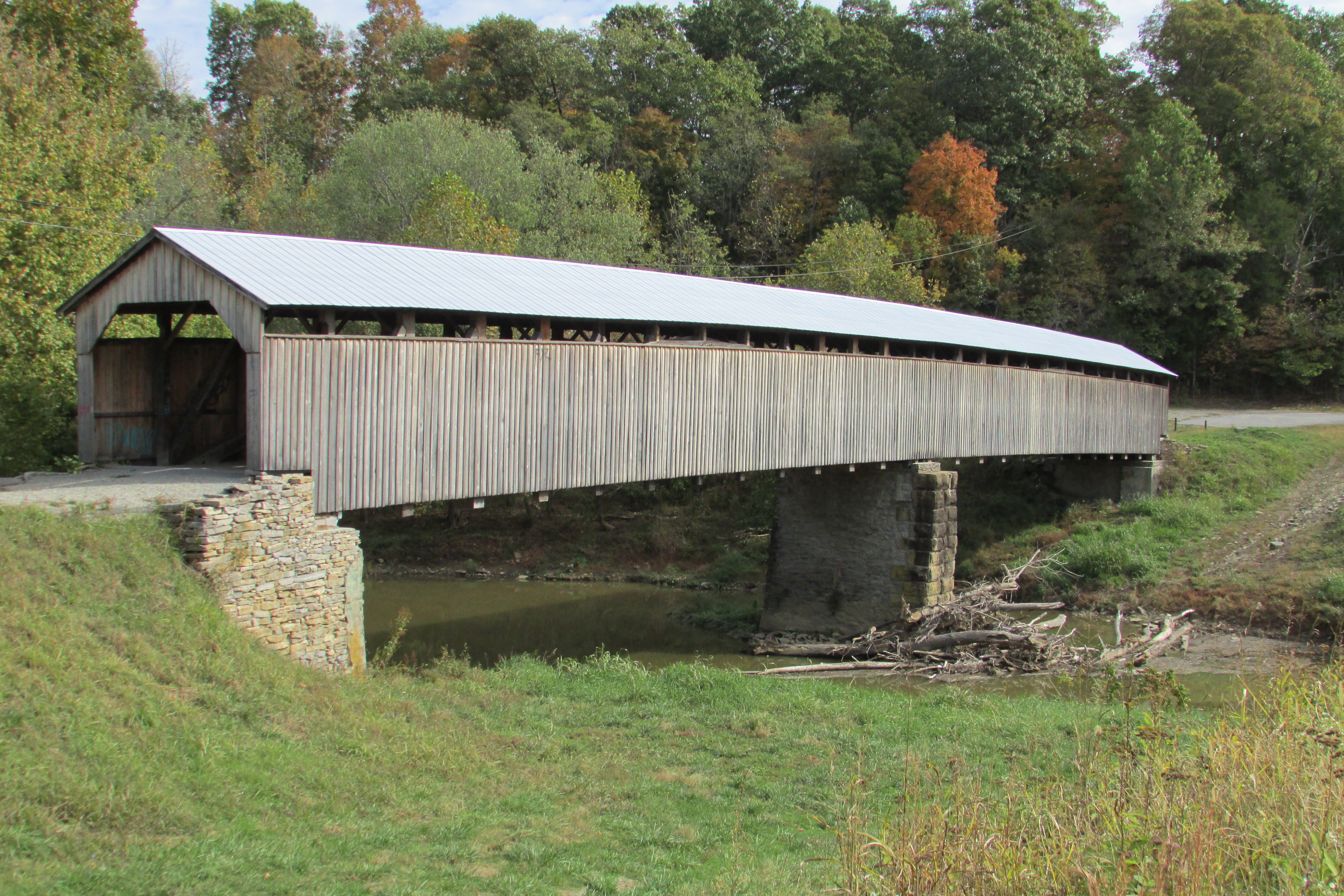
- 2019

- Location within Kentucky Location within the United States
- Nearest city: Mooresville, Kentucky
- Coordinates: 37°49′41″N 85°15′23″W
- Area: 2 acres (0.81 ha)
- Built: 1871
- Built by: Barnes, H.L.; Barnes, William F.
- Architectural style: Burr truss
- Demolished: 2021
- NRHP reference No.: 76000958
- Added to NRHP: March 26, 1976

Mount Zion Covered Bridge was a 280 feet (85 m) long Burr truss covered bridge near Mooresville, Kentucky. It was built in 1871 and burned down in 2021. For 150 years it spanned the Little Beech Fork north of Mooresville on Kentucky Route 458.

The bridge had been closed to vehicular traffic when a new bridge was constructed beside it, but it remained a tourist attraction as the longest multi-span covered bridge in Kentucky.

Beech Fork, Mooresville, and Mount Zion were all accepted names for the bridge. Mount Zion appears to be the most used historic name. It was listed on the National Register of Historic Places in 1976. Records from 1871 indicate it to be 280 feet long and 18 feet wide, but a measurement taken by Kentucky's Department of Transportation in the 1970s measured it at 211 feet.

During a 2015-2017 restoration of the bridge it was determined by the contractor, Arnold M. Graton Associates of Ashland, New Hampshire, that the arches were a very early modification to the bridge. As such, the bridge was reclassified as a Multiple Kingpost Truss with added arches.

It burned down on March 9, 2021; suspected arson.

== Gallery ==
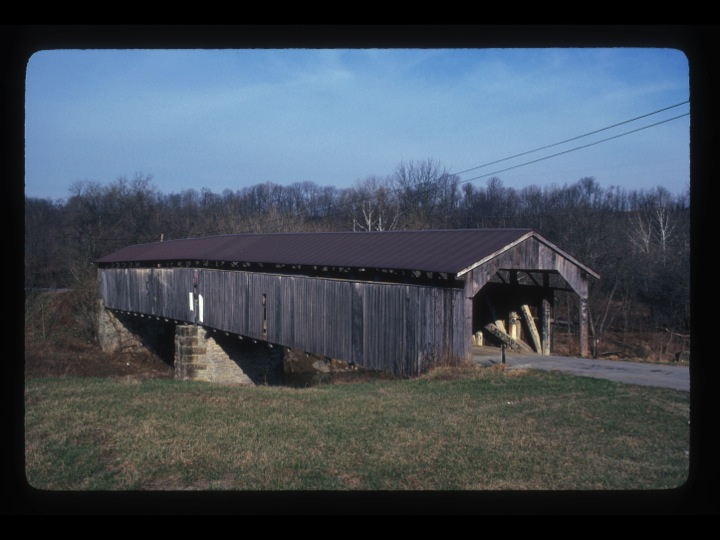
Bridge before 2015 renovation

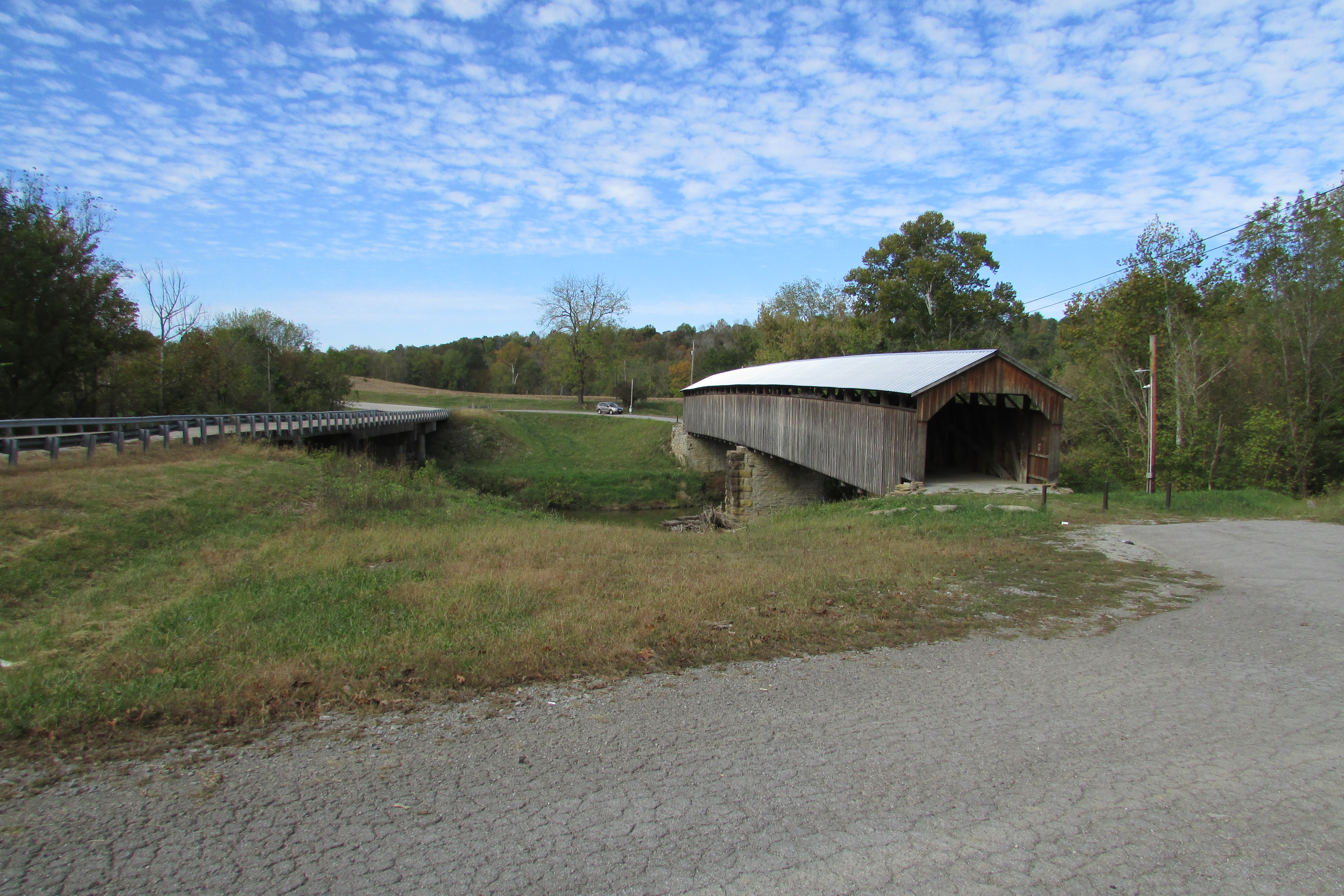
Covered bridge side by side with newer vehicular traffic bridge (2019)

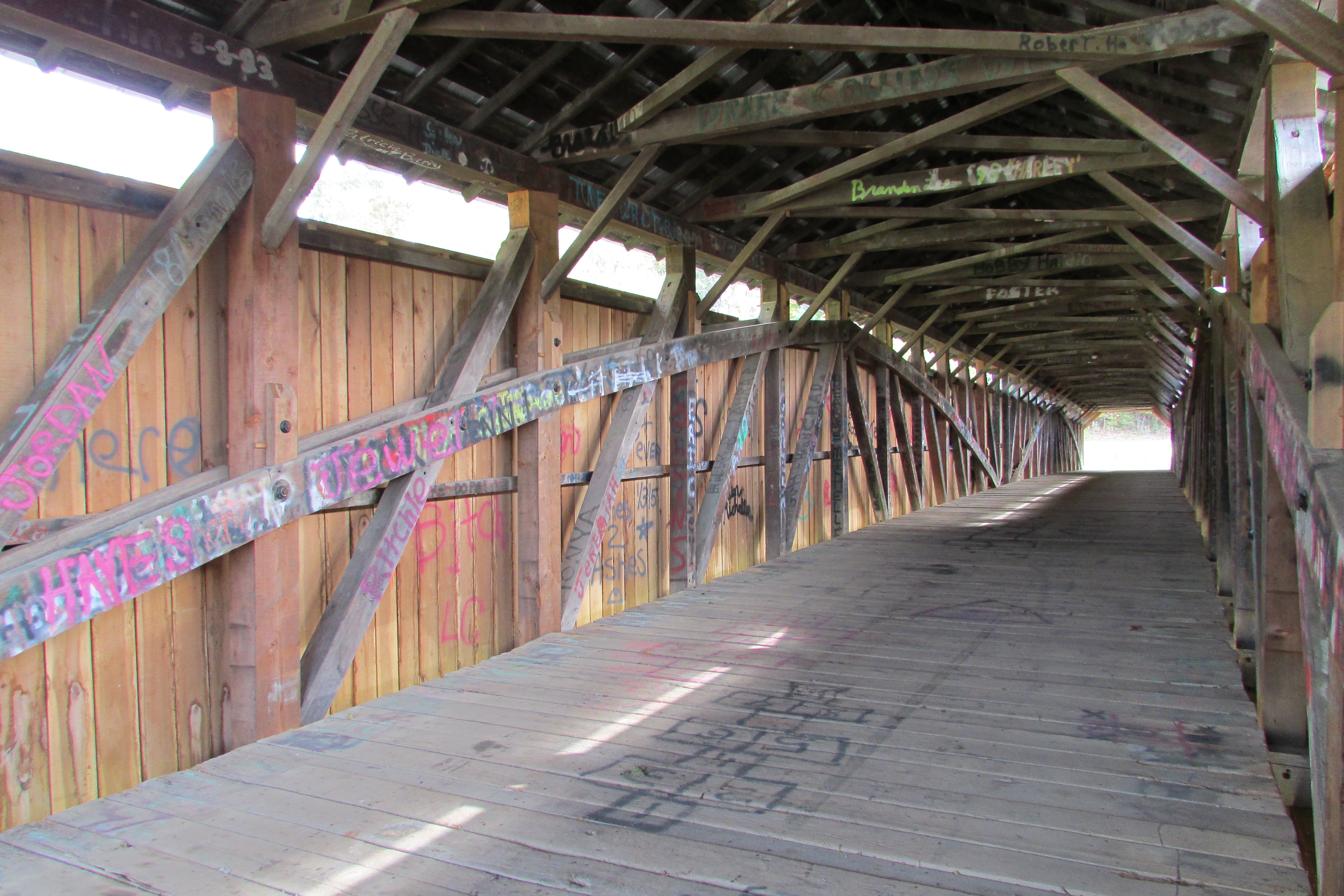
Interior view of arches (2019)

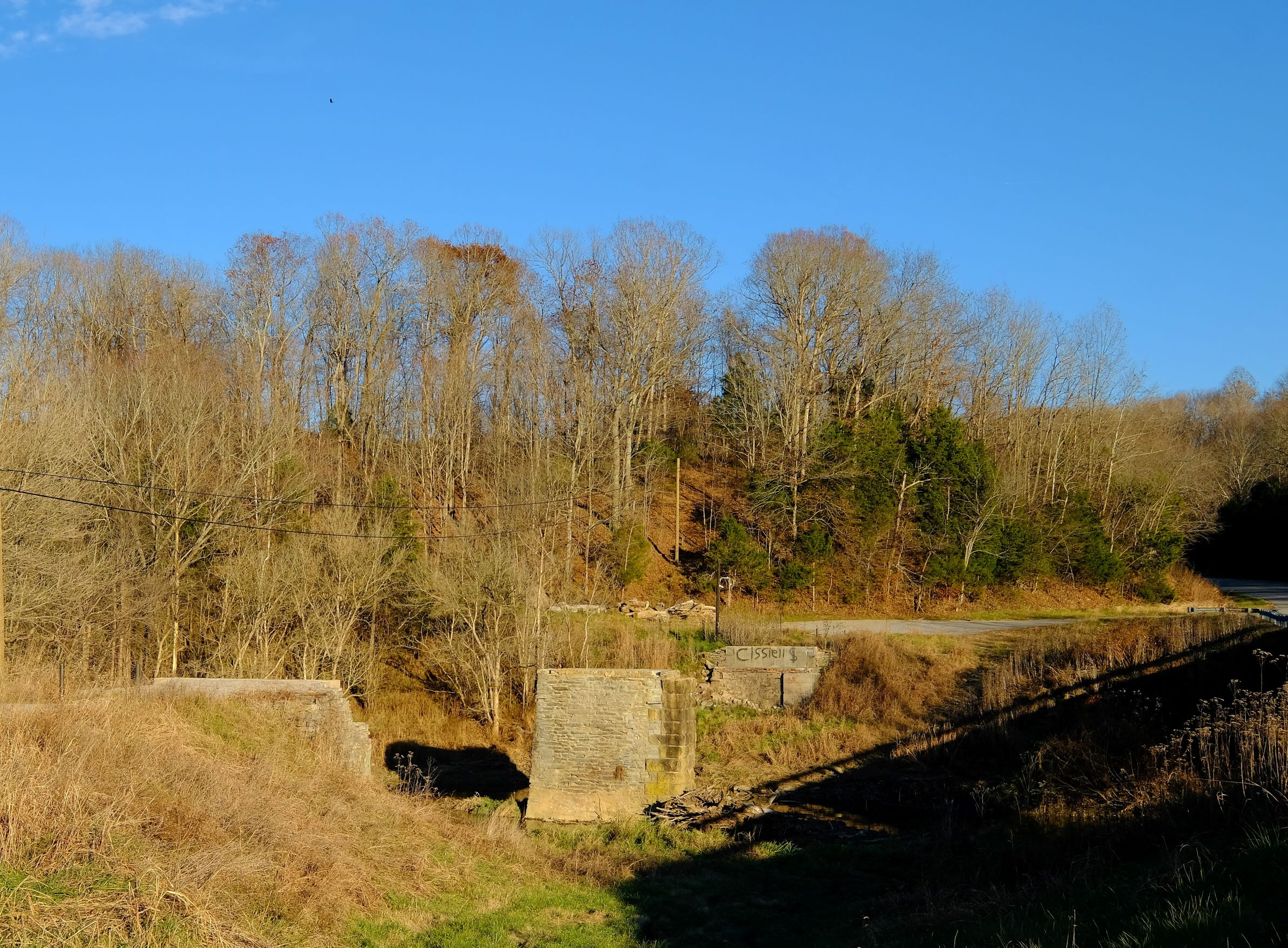
Mount Zion bridge stone foundations after the arson in 2021

== Bibliography ==
- Alien, Richard S. Covered Bridges of the South. New York: Bonanza Books, 1970.
- Kentucky Covered Bridge Association. Timbered Tunnel Talk. Newport, Kentucky (various issues).
