= Washington County Courthouse (Kentucky) =

- U.S. National Register of Historic Places
- U.S. Historic district – Contributing property
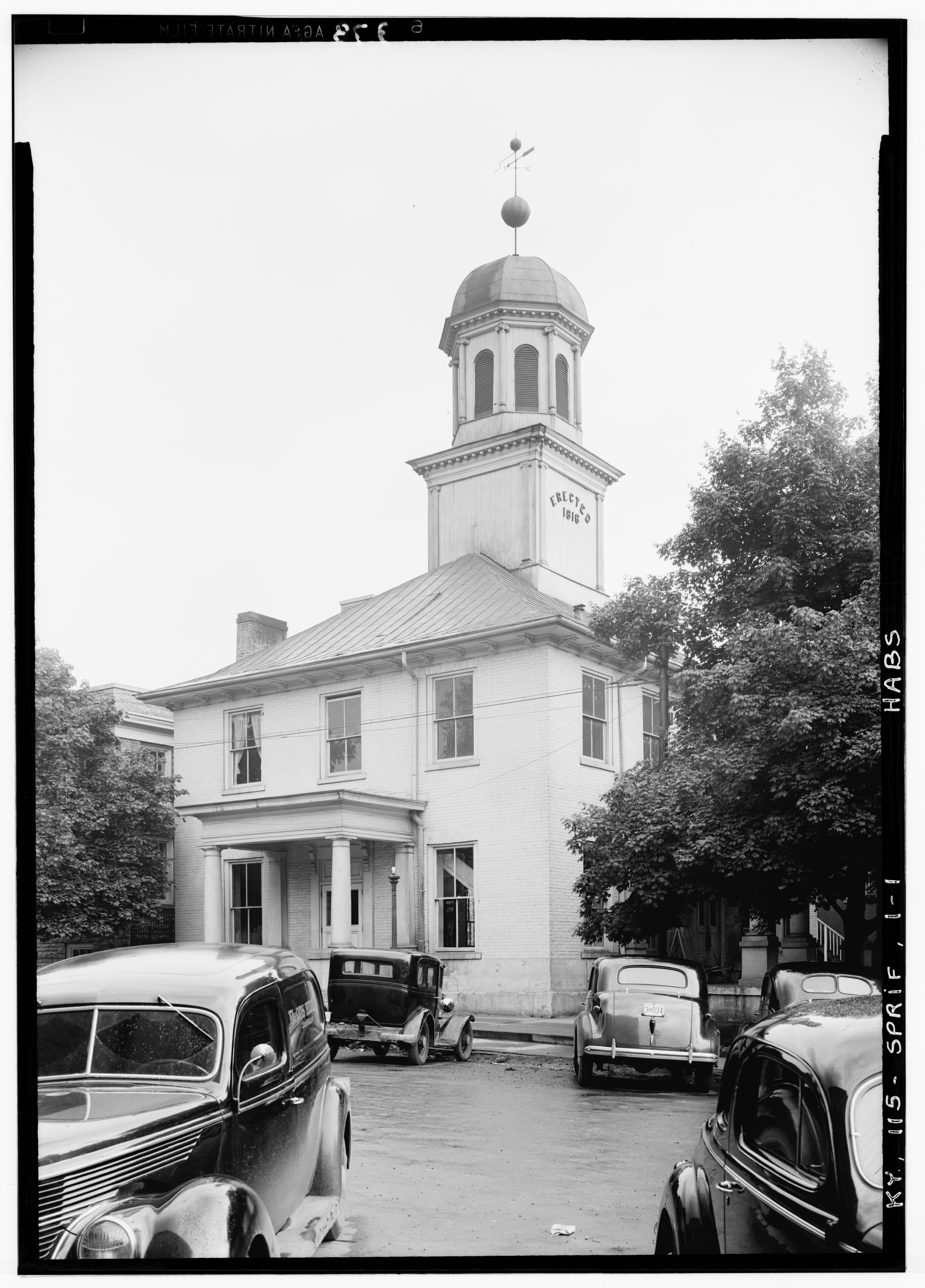

- Location within Kentucky Location within the United States
- Location: Public Sq., Main at Lincoln Park Rd., Springfield, Kentucky
- Coordinates: 37°41′6″N 85°13′16″W
- Area: less than one acre
- Built: 1814-15
- Built by: Thomas H. Letcher
- Architect: Frank Brewer
- Architectural style: Georgian
- Part of: Springfield Main Street Historic District (ID88003434)
- NRHP reference No.: 77000660
- Added to NRHP: July 25, 1977

The Washington County Courthouse in Springfield in Washington County, Kentucky is located on Springfield's Public Square, at Main at Lincoln Park Rd. It was built during 1814–15. It was listed on the National Register of Historic Places in 1977.

It is a two-story brick courthouse, with brick laid in Flemish bond. Among other changes designed by architect Frank Brewer, it has an octagonal cupola added in 1840.

It is included as a contributing building in the Springfield Main Street Historic District.
