= Clements House (Springfield, Kentucky) =

Historic house in Kentucky, United States

- U.S. National Register of Historic Places
- Nearest city: Springfield, Kentucky
- Coordinates: 37°42′15″N 85°15′11″W
- Area: less than one acre
- Architectural style: Greek Revival
- MPS: Washington County MRA
- NRHP reference No.: 88003401
- Added to NRHP: February 10, 1989

The Clements House, located west of Springfield, Kentucky on U.S. Route 150, was listed on the National Register of Historic Places in 1989.

It is a five-bay brick two-story building with brick laid in Flemish bond. Some elements of Greek Revival style are present.

Dinner was served to soldiers before the Battle of Perryville, according to the owners in 1983.
