= John R. Barber House =

Historic house in Kentucky, United States

- U.S. National Register of Historic Places
- Location within Kentucky Location within the United States
- Nearest city: Springfield, Kentucky
- Coordinates: 37°42′49″N 85°15′50″W
- Area: 9 acres (3.6 ha)
- Built: c.1904-05
- Architect: Brewer, Frank
- Architectural style: Colonial Revival
- MPS: Washington County MRA
- NRHP reference No.: 88003423
- Added to NRHP: February 10, 1989

The John R. Barber House, near Springfield, Kentucky, was built in about 1904 or 1905. It was listed on the National Register of Historic Places in 1989. The listing included three contributing buildings and one contributing structure on 9 acres (3.6 ha).

The house is a two-story brick structure on a limestone foundation. It has a hipped roof with a jerkinhead.

The Matthew Walton Law Office, separately NRHP-listed in 1977, is adjacent to the property.
