= Walnut Street Historic District (Springfield, Kentucky) =

Historic district in Kentucky, United States

- U.S. National Register of Historic Places
- U.S. Historic district
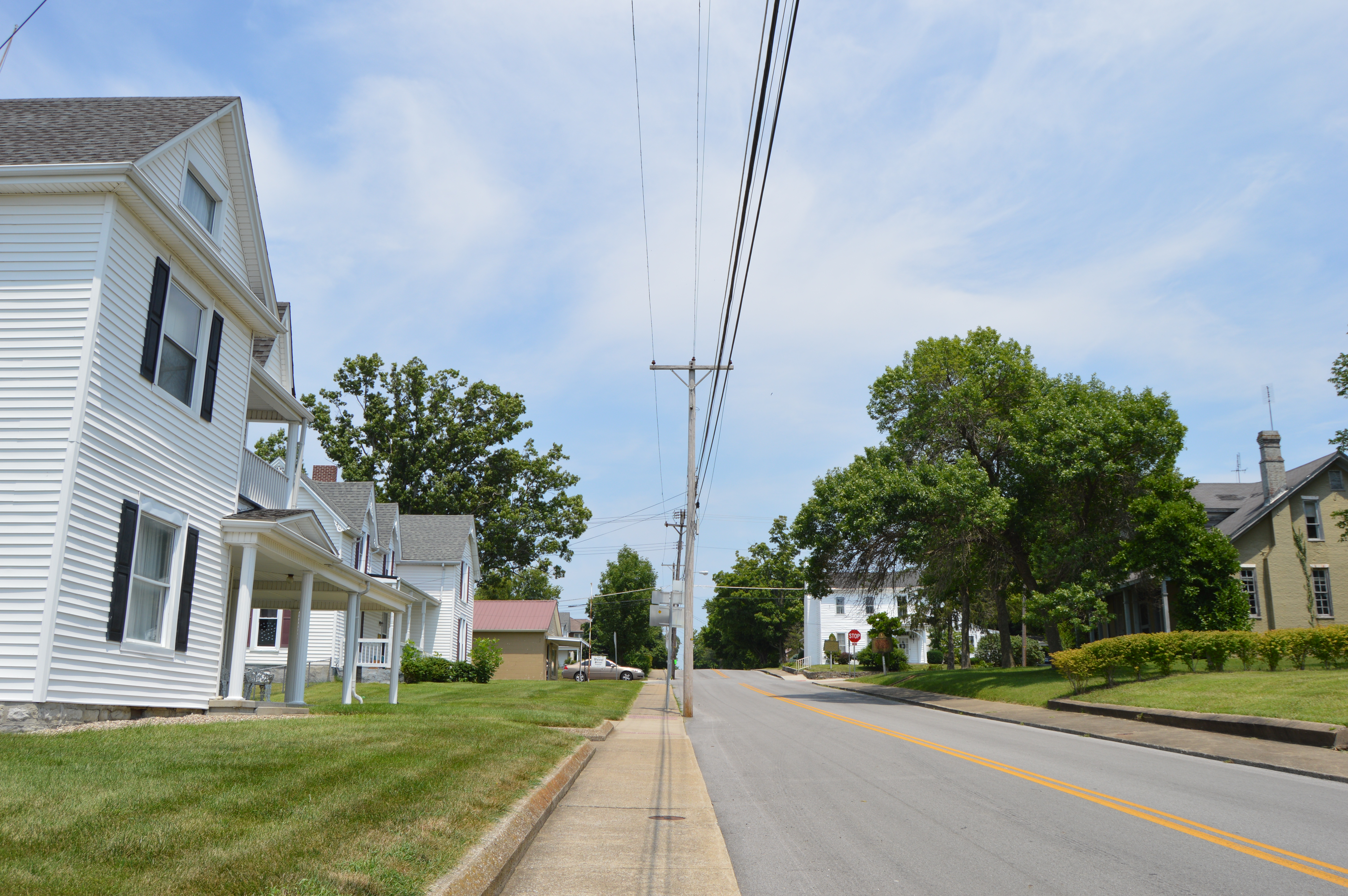

- Location within Kentucky Location within the United States
- Location: 200-600 blocks of Walnut St., Springfield, Kentucky
- Coordinates: 37°41′12″N 85°13′10″W
- Area: 7 acres (2.8 ha)
- Architectural style: Bungalow/craftsman, Late Victorian, Federal
- MPS: Washington County MRA
- NRHP reference No.: 88003435
- Added to NRHP: February 10, 1989

The Walnut Street Historic District is a historic district which was listed on the National Register of Historic Places in 1989.

The 7 acres (2.8 ha) listed area included 36 contributing buildings.

One of the more important properties is the John Thompson House/Bainbridge Tavern, which served as a tavern operated from 1817 to 1830 by John W. Bainbridge. It is a two-story three-bay log building; it may have been built as a hall/parlor plan house originally. It has a massive brick chimney and very old beaded weatherboarding.
