= William Blackwell House =

Historic house in Kentucky, United States

- U.S. National Register of Historic Places
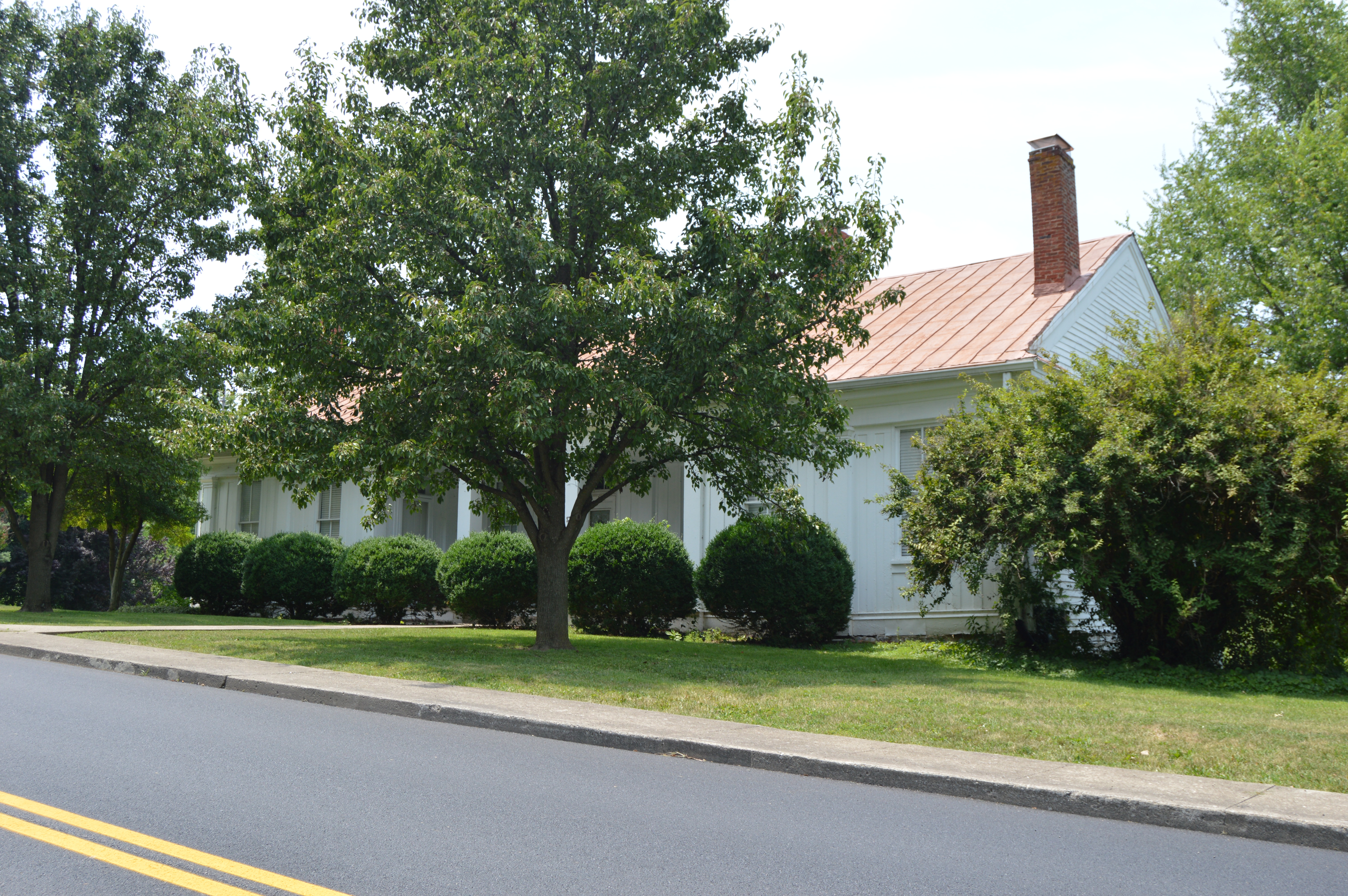
- Location: 138 Lebanon Hill, Springfield, Kentucky
- Coordinates: 37°40′55″N 85°13′28″W
- Area: less than one acre
- Built: 1860
- Architectural style: Greek Revival
- MPS: Washington County MRA
- NRHP reference No.: 88003391
- Added to NRHP: February 10, 1989

The William Blackwell House, at 138 Lebanon Hill in Springfield, Kentucky, was built in c.1860 by William Blackwell. It was listed on the National Register of Historic Places in 1989.

It is a seven-bay single-story frame house with a recessed front porch. It has pilasters and an architrave. Its interior has Greek Revival mantels.
