= Maud, Kentucky =

Unincorporated community in Kentucky, United States

Maud
- Unincorporated community
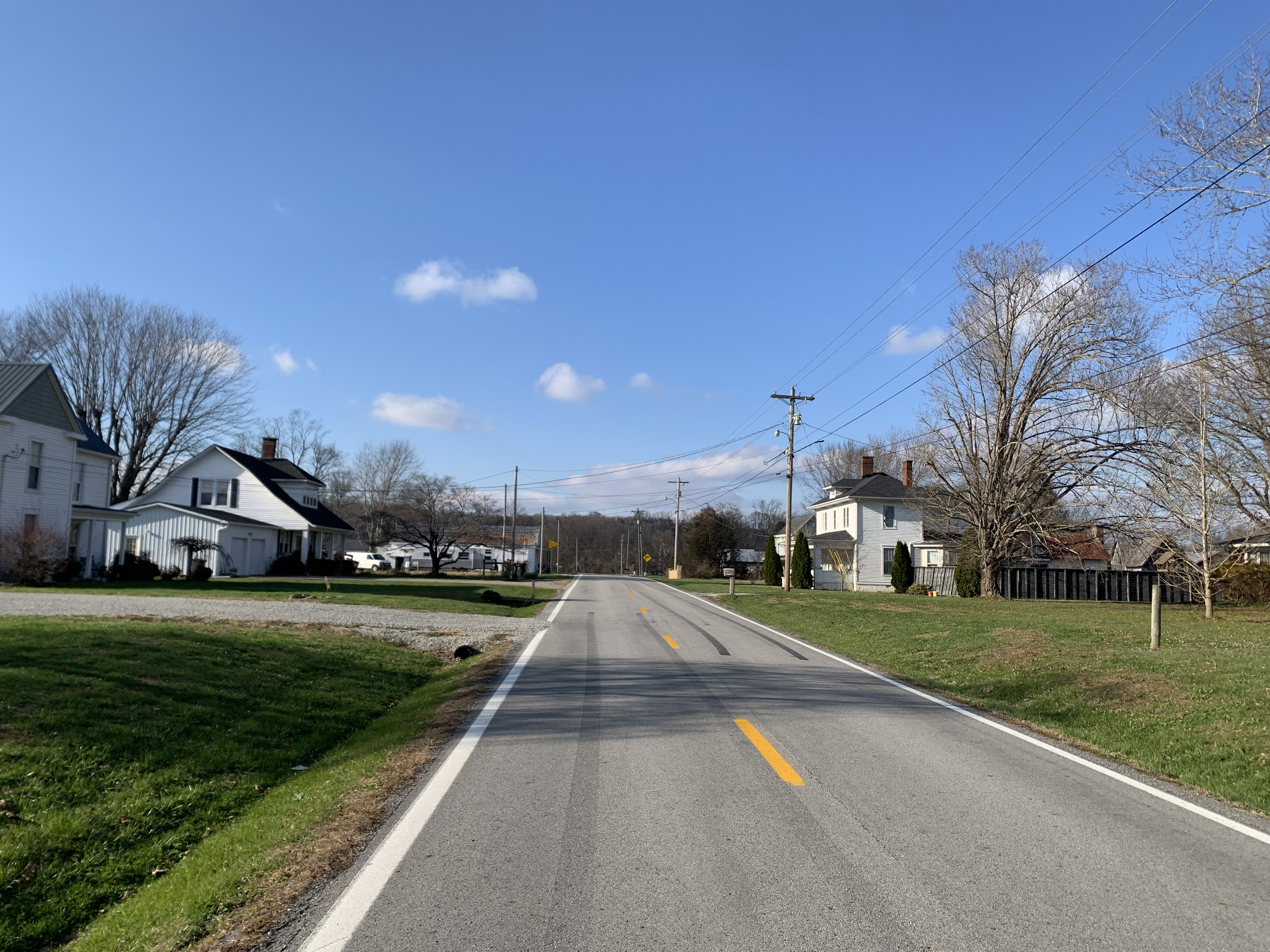
- Kentucky Highway 55 at Maud, facing northwest

- Location within the state of Kentucky Maud (the United States)
- Coordinates: 37°49′17″N 85°17′48″W
- Country: United States
- State: Kentucky
- County: Washington
- Elevation: 561 ft (171 m)
- Time zone: UTC-5 (Eastern (EST))
  - Summer (DST): UTC-4 (EST)
- GNIS feature ID: 508561

Maud is an unincorporated community located in Washington County, Kentucky, United States. Its post office is closed.

== Geography ==
Maud is located in northwest Washington County along Beech Fork just across from Nelson County. Kentucky Route 55 runs through the community.

== Population ==
The population of Maud was 8,276 as of the 2020 census, with an average of 31 people per square mile. Males make up 48.6% of the population, while Females make up 51.4%. 89.3% of Maud identifies as white, 9.9% as African American, 4.1% as Hispanic, 0.5% as Asian, and 0.3% as Indian. The total adds up to 104.1% because some identify as multiple races.

== Political Demographics ==
In the 2020 Presidential Election, 72.02% of the population voted for Donald Trump and Republican candidates, while 26.42% voted for Kamala Harris and Democratic candidates, 1.6% voted for Jo Jorgensen and Libertarian candidates, and 0.4% voted for others. Maud is part of Kentucky’s 1st congressional district, which is represented by James Comer in the U. S. House of Representatives, and in the U.S Senate by Rand Paul and the retiring Mitch McConnell, whose seat will be taken by Senator-elect Andy Barr. Maud is represented by Kim King in the Kentucky State House of Representatives, and currently represented in the Kentucky State Senate by Jimmy Higdon, who is retiring, and his seat will be taken by Senator-elect Ben Mudd.

== Historic Buildings ==
==== Ray-Wakefield House ====
The Ray-Wakefield House, also known as Wakefield place, is located on KY 55, which runs directly through Maud. The house is 2 stories tall, and is made out of brick. The house has 3 chimneys, 2 in the living area, and one in the slave quarters/kitchen. The house was built in 1825, and is what is called a Greek Revival style. The house was built by a man named Ray, who sold it to the Wakefield family in 1858, this is why it is called the Ray-Wakefield House. The house was added to the National Register of Historic Places on February 10, 1988.

===== Glenn Cottage Tract =====
The Glenn Cottage was built in 1826, by the family of Sally Curtsinger. The cottage was built out of wood, with 3 brick chimneys, 2 on one side, 1 on the other. The front has 3 large bay windows looking out on KY 55. The surrounding porch used to be taller, but the rot over time forced them to be cut shorter. The cottage is 1 story tall, and is one of the oldest and best preserved buildings in Washington County.
