= Ed Cusick House =

Historic house in Kentucky, United States

- U.S. National Register of Historic Places
- Location within Kentucky Location within the United States
- Location: Bearwallow Rd., 9 miles (14 km) west of Springfield, Kentucky
- Coordinates: 37°42′59″N 85°21′59″W
- Area: 0.3 acres (0.12 ha)
- MPS: Washington County MRA
- NRHP reference No.: 88003426
- Added to NRHP: February 10, 1989

The Ed Cusick House, located west of Springfield, Kentucky, on Bearwallow Rd., was listed on the National Register of Historic Places in 1989.

It is a three-bay two-story log house with an ell, built in the second quarter of the 1800s.
