= Manton, Kentucky =

Unincorporated community in Kentucky, United States

Manton
- Unincorporated community
- Location within the state of Kentucky Manton (the United States)
- Coordinates: 37°42′53″N 85°23′7″W
- Country: United States
- State: Kentucky
- County: Washington
- Elevation: 530 ft (160 m)
- Time zone: UTC-5 (Eastern (EST))
  - Summer (DST): UTC-4 (EDT)

Manton (formerly Blincoe) is an unincorporated community in the central part of the U.S. state of Kentucky, located on the western edge of Washington County near the intersection of Marion, Nelson, and Washington counties. It was founded at least before 1844, when Holy Rosary Church was founded. The cornerstone for the present church was laid November 2, 1844. Holy Rosary, a mission church, is a brick building on Hardin's Creek close to the Beech Fork River. Rev. Victor Francis O'Daniel O.P.M. mentions in his book "A Light Of The Church In Kentucky" (copyright 1932) on page 140 that a station "... was possibly that of Wilfred Fields, where now stands Holy Rosary Church, Manton (or Blincoe)".

This village was once known as Blincoe as is identified as such in the 1896 Kentucky Gazetteer. Richard Blincoe was a resident at that time. It was known as Blincoe until (at least) the mid-1900s, as it appears on as such on the 1949 official Kentucky highway map for Washington County. Derivation of the name of this town has been attributed to the surnames of William Frederick Mandt and his wife, Mary Ann Harrington; however, the Kentucky town and U.S.Post Office named in their honor was Manton, Floyd County, Kentucky, ZIP Code (now inactive) 41648. The Mandt Family of Manton, Floyd County, were generous supporters of Catholic religious and educational interests in the region of Nelson and Washington Counties in the early-to-mid-Twentieth Century, and it has been suggested that Blincoe was redesignated as "Manton" in recognition of their support. However, Mr. and Mrs. Mandt were married in 1894, and any appearance of the name "Manton" prior to that time is not attributable to their family.

Newton's Grocery has been located at this site for over 80 years. Once a general store serving the area and community, it is now more like a convenience store.

== Geography ==
Manton is located at (37.714722, -85.35827). The elevation is 530 feet (160 m) above sea level. The community is located along Route 605, near where the Cisselville road intersects. It is a few miles north of Loretto where Maker's Mark whiskey is distilled.

== History ==
There was a station house on the Beech Fork, a small river, where farmers would store their cattle and produce. In the springtime these waters would flood, providing a waterway which lead first to the Salt River, then to the Ohio River and thence by flatboat the boatsmen could make their way to New Orleans.

Some companies of men from the Tenth Kentucky Infantry were mustered into Union service having come from the village of Manton. Most of the men from the Manton area were in Company G.

John Hunt Morgan, the Confederate raider, passed through this area on some of his raids into Kentucky. The town is also mentioned in the biography "Three Years in the Saddle – the Life and Confession of Henry C. Magruder" - "The original 'Sue Munday'" - "The Scourge of Kentucky".

The small community was once home to a distillery of Kentucky Bourbon named Price and Thompson Distilleries, which closed in 1894.
