= Richard Berry Jr. House (Springfield, Kentucky) =

Historic house in Kentucky, United States

- U.S. National Register of Historic Places
- Location within Kentucky Location within the United States
- Location: On Kentucky Route 438, north of Springfield, Kentucky
- Coordinates: 37°46′10″N 85°13′33″W
- Architectural style: Log House
- NRHP reference No.: 88003400
- Added to NRHP: February 10, 1989

The Richard Berry Jr. House is located in Springfield, Kentucky, and has been on the National Register of Historic Places listing in Washington County, Kentucky since 1989.

== Richard and Rachel Berry ==
About 1785 Richard Berry Sr. moved to Kentucky from Virginia with his wife, Rachel Shipley. (Note: According to a Genealogical and Historical Index, Berry was on a Commission to build a road between Frankfort and Springfield.) From his will proven on December 4, 1798, Richard and Rachel had seven children: "Joanna, Sarah, Rachel, Richard, Francis, Jane, [and] Edward".

== The house ==
The 2 storied log, frame dwelling has a brick chimney, 3 bays and a gabled roof. It was originally located north of Highway 438 about 8 miles from Springfield, Kentucky in Litsey. It was the best example of a log single cell dwelling in the county. The Beechland neighborhood was sometimes called Poortown, which actually was home to successful landowners and the small cabins of people who worked for them.

Richard Berry and his house were described as follows:

Richard Berry was well-to-do, and his double, hewn-log cabin, that fronted the road a short distance from the ford at Beech Fork, was one of the largest houses in Washington County.

== Thomas and Nancy Lincoln marriage ==
Thomas Lincoln on June 12, 1806, married Nancy Hanks in the Richard Berry home. The day after the wedding the Lincolns enjoyed a "luxurious" infare supper of lamb, venison, bear steak, turkey, duck, and a wide range of dishes at the Richard Berry home. (Note: In the source, Tarbel mentions that the infare supper is given by Richard Berry believed to be the uncle and guardian of Nancy Hanks, but the man believed to be Nancy's uncle is Richard Berry, Sr. who died in 1798, 8 years before the wedding. Regarding who gave the infare supper, she is likely referring to Richard Berry Jr. who signed the marriage bond for this 1806 marriage.)

Nancy, an excellent seamstress, worked for Richard Berry Jr. before her marriage. Nancy was brought to the home by her friend Polly Ewing Berry, the wife of Richard Berry Jr. Polly was a friend of Nancys from Mercer County, Kentucky and Richard Berry Jr. was a good friend of Thomas Lincoln. Nancy's marriage bond was signed by Richard Berry Jr. who identified himself as her guardian. (Note: According to author Ralph Gary, upon moving to Washington County, Kentucky Lucy and Nancy lived at Beech Fork with relatives Rachel Shipley Berry and Richard Berry. Author Ralph Gary stated that Rachel is one of Lucy's sisters. The National Park Service states in their summary of Nancy Hanks life that Richard Berry is an uncle, but not how he is related. This fits with the theory that Rachael Shipley is a relative of Lucy Shipley who married a Hanks. This is contrary to the theory that Nancy was illegitimate and that Lucy was born into the Hanks family, as was published by William E. Barton in the "Life of Abraham Lincoln" and Michael Burkhimer in "100 Essential Lincoln Books". John M. Hay and John George Nicolay, authors of "Abraham Lincoln" asserted that Berry was a connection of Lincoln's. In his book, Doug Wead stated that Rachel was working for Richard Berry as a seamstress. See the Nancy Lincoln article for more information, particularly regarding her being raised by the Hanks and Sparrows.)

== Francis Berry House ==
The Francis Berry house, or Berry House, was originally located about a mile east of its present location in the Lincoln Homestead State Park in Springfield, Kentucky. Francis Berry was a brother to another early settler, Richard Berry. It is one theory that it was this house, the Francis Berry House, where Nancy Hanks was courted by and married to Thomas Lincoln. The couple were the parents of the 16th United States President, Abraham Lincoln. (Note: There is one theory that Thomas proposed to Nancy in the Francis Berry house in front of the fireplace. Another theory is that Lincoln proposed to her in his childhood home at what is now Lincoln Homestead State Park in Washington County, Kentucky.)

The home, originally in the Beechland section, and now in the Lincoln Homestead State Park, is furnished with "pioneer relics of the Lincoln Age."
