= Stephen Cooke Brown House =

Historic house in Kentucky, United States

- U.S. National Register of Historic Places
- Location within Kentucky Location within the United States
- Location: Kentucky Route 438, .5 miles (0.80 km) north of Springfield, Kentucky
- Coordinates: 37°45′40″N 85°10′20″W
- Area: less than one acre
- Built: 1843
- Architectural style: Greek Revival
- MPS: Washington County MRA
- NRHP reference No.: 88003471
- Added to NRHP: November 21, 1994

The Stephen Cooke Brown House, on Kentucky Route 438 near Springfield, Kentucky, was built in 1843. It was listed on the National Register of Historic Places in 1994.

It is a two-story Greek Revival-style house with a portico that has been modified. It has pilasters.
