= Johnson's Chapel AME Church =

Historic church in Kentucky, United States

- U.S. National Register of Historic Places
- Location within Kentucky Location within the United States
- Location: E. High St., Springfield, Kentucky
- Coordinates: 37°41′3″N 85°13′0″W
- Area: less than one acre
- Built: 1872; 154 years ago
- Built by: McElroy, Wilse
- Architectural style: Gothic Revival
- MPS: Washington County MRA
- NRHP reference No.: 88003396
- Added to NRHP: February 10, 1989

Johnson's Chapel AME Church, a historic church on E. High Street in Springfield, Kentucky, was built in 1872 and added to the National Register in 1989.

Church member and builder Wilse McElroy constructed the building for a congregation formed before the Civil War. The site was deemed significant "as an important example of late 19th c. Gothic architecture" and "as an important local black history site with important associations."

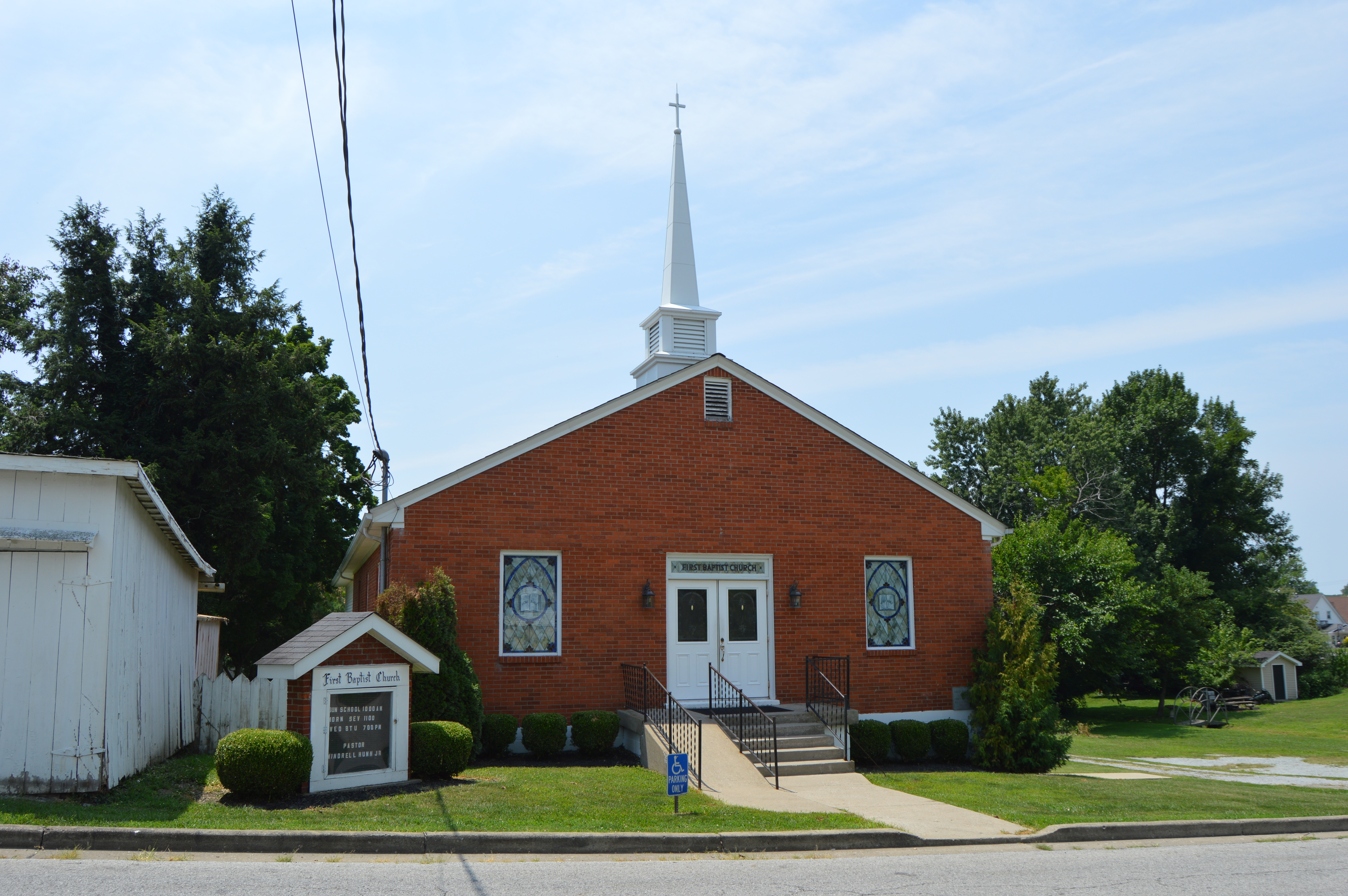
First Baptist Church of Springfield

The original Johnson's Chapel AME Church building appears no longer to exist. The First Baptist Church of Springfield occupies its former site.
