= Willisburg Historic District =

Historic district in Kentucky, United States

- Walnut Street Historic District
- U.S. National Register of Historic Places
- U.S. Historic district
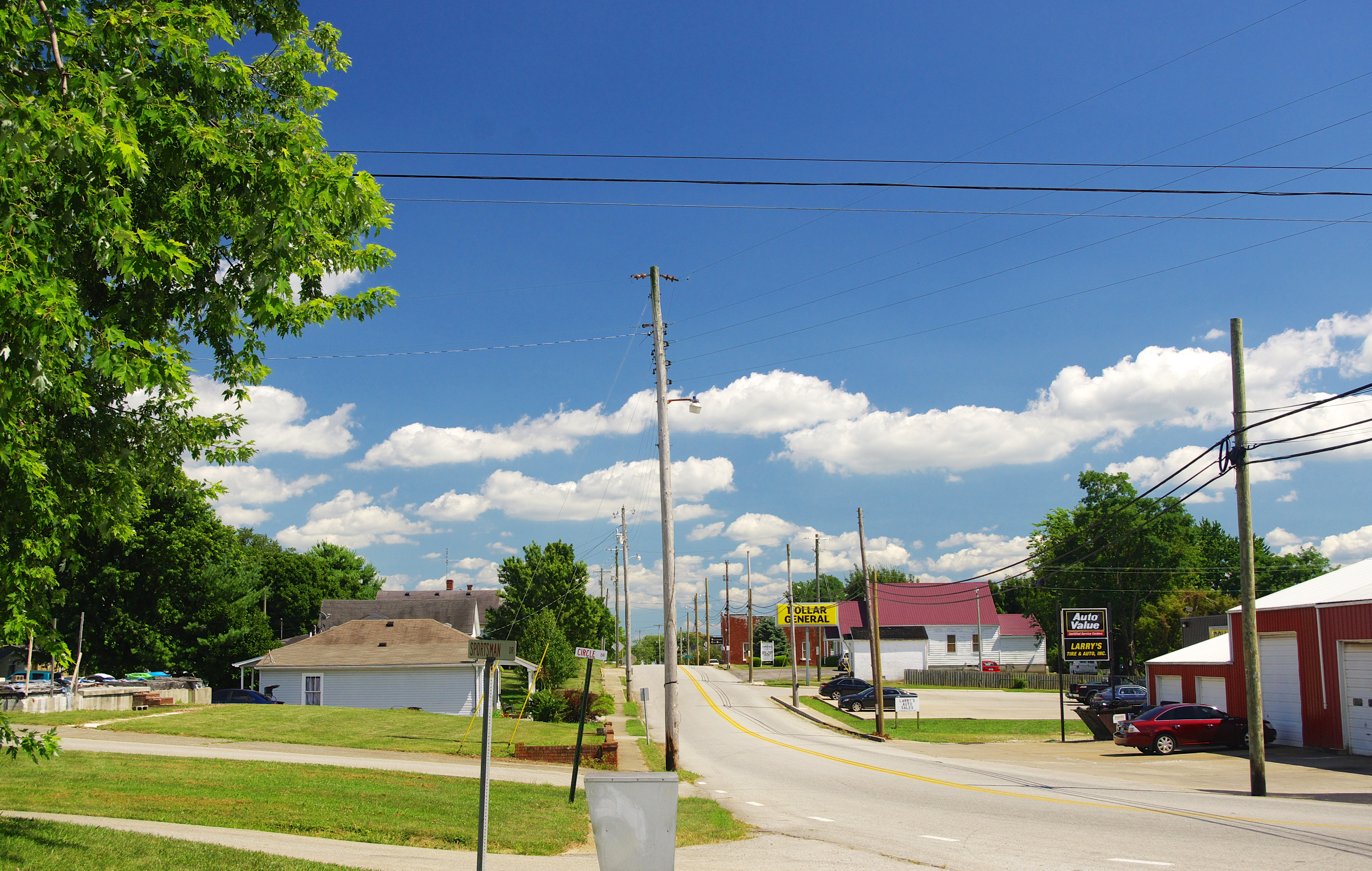
- Main Street near Sportsman Lane

- Location within Kentucky Location within the United States
- Location: Along Kentucky Routes 53 and 433, Willisburg, Kentucky
- Coordinates: 37°48′27″N 85°07′25″W
- Architectural style: Craftsman, Gothic Revival, Colonial Revival
- MPS: Washington County MRA
- NRHP reference No.: 12001204
- Added to NRHP: January 22, 2014

The Willisburg Historic District is a historic district which was listed on the National Register of Historic Places in 2014.

The district covers a crossroads community. The roads crossing are Kentucky Route 433 (which runs northwest to southeast) and Kentucky Route 53 (which runs southwest to northeast). These two routes coincide down the Main Street of Willisburg, but diverge at each end of the community. The listed area included 51 contributing buildings and one contributing site, as well as 47 non-contributing buildings and three non-contributing sites.
