= Mackville, Kentucky =

- City
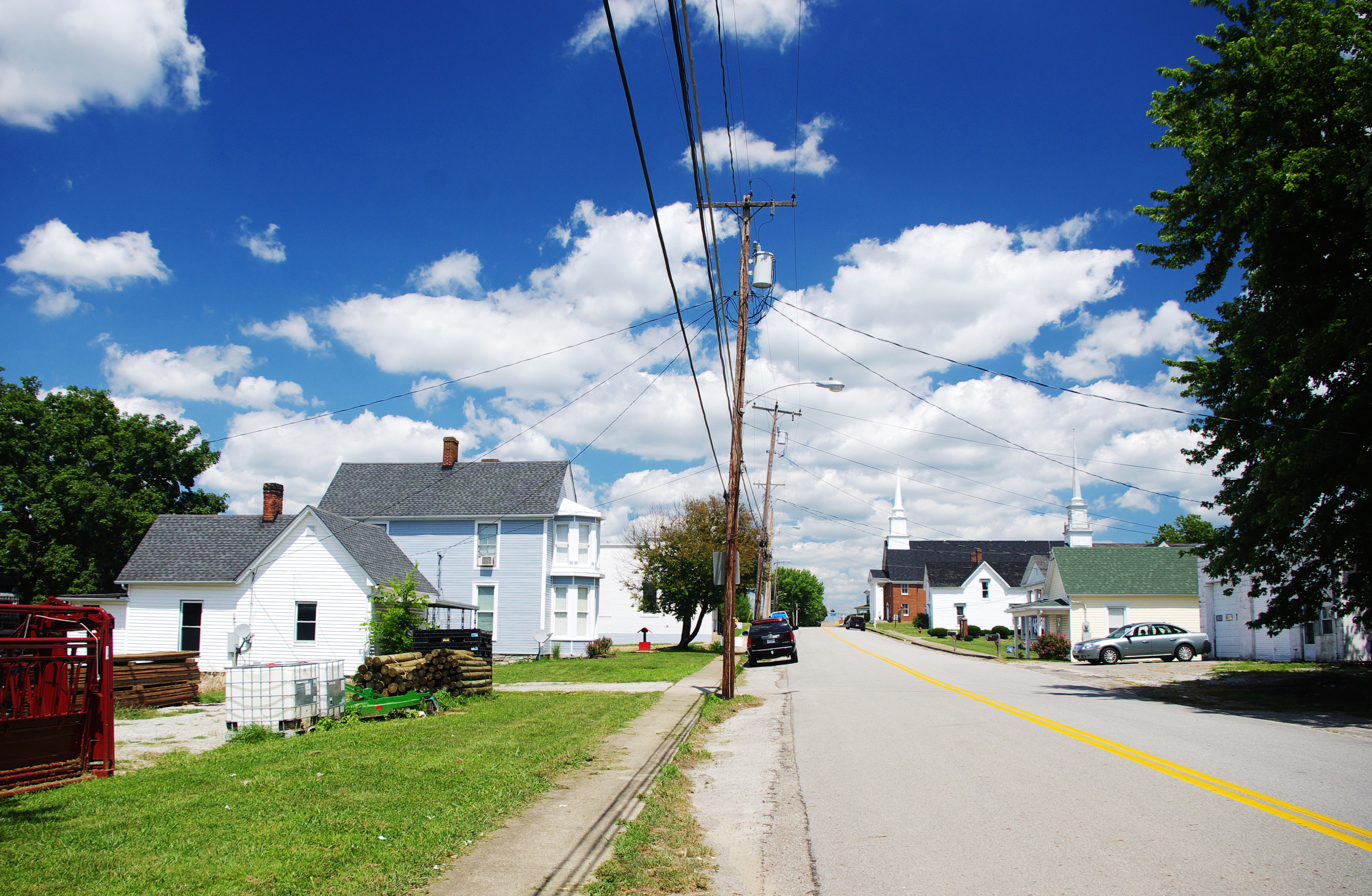
- KY 152 in Mackville

- Location of Mackville in Washington County, Kentucky.
- Coordinates: 37°44′08″N 85°04′12″W
- Country: United States
- State: Kentucky
- County: Washington
- Incorporated: 1967

Area
  - Total: 0.41 sq mi (1.06 km^{2})
  - Land: 0.41 sq mi (1.05 km^{2})
  - Water: 0.0039 sq mi (0.01 km^{2})
- Elevation: 896 ft (273 m)

Population (2020)
  - Total: 207
  - Density: 511.4/sq mi (197.47/km^{2})
- Time zone: UTC-5 (Eastern (EST))
  - Summer (DST): UTC-4 (EDT)
- ZIP code: 40040
- Area code: 859
- FIPS code: 21-49206
- GNIS feature ID: 2404985

Mackville is a home rule-class city in Washington County, Kentucky, United States. The population was 207 at the time of the 2020 census.

== History ==
Mackville was established in 1818 as "Maxville." It was named for Captain John McKittrick, an American Revolutionary War veteran who owned the original tract upon which the city was founded. The name was changed to the current spelling when a post office was established in the city in 1826.

== Geography ==
According to the United States Census Bureau, the city has a total area of 0.4 square miles (1.0 km^{2}), all land. The city is situated in eastern Washington County, west of Harrodsburg and east of Springfield, and is concentrated around the intersection of Kentucky Route 152 and Kentucky Route 433.

== Demographics ==
Historical population
Census	Pop.	Note	%±
1860	216		—
1870	180		−16.7%
1900	171		—
1910	190		11.1%
1970	219		—
1980	229		4.6%
1990	200		−12.7%
2000	206		3.0%
2010	222		7.8%
2020	207		−6.8%
U.S. Decennial Census

As of the census of 2000, there were 206 people, 93 households, and 59 families residing in the city. The population density was 544.4 inhabitants per square mile (210.2/km^{2}). There were 103 housing units at an average density of 272.2 per square mile (105.1/km^{2}). The racial makeup of the city was 96.60% White, 2.91% African American, and 0.49% from two or more races.

There were 93 households, out of which 21.5% had children under the age of 18 living with them, 53.8% were married couples living together, 8.6% had a female householder with no husband present, and 35.5% were non-families. 33.3% of all households were made up of individuals, and 22.6% had someone living alone who was 65 years of age or older. The average household size was 2.22 and the average family size was 2.80.

In the city, the population was spread out, with 16.5% under the age of 18, 8.7% from 18 to 24, 21.4% from 25 to 44, 24.8% from 45 to 64, and 28.6% who were 65 years of age or older. The median age was 47 years. For every 100 females, there were 80.7 males. For every 100 females age 18 and over, there were 81.1 males.

The median income for a household in the city was $32,250, and the median income for a family was $43,125. Males had a median income of $31,250 versus $33,750 for females. The per capita income for the city was $16,837. About 3.3% of families and 9.0% of the population were below the poverty line, including none of those under the age of eighteen and 23.7% of those 65 or over.
