= Kentucky Route 152 =

State highway in Kentucky, United States

Kentucky Route 152

Route information
- Maintained by KYTC
- Length: 51.491 mi (82.867 km)

Major junctions
- West end: KY 49 near Loretto
- US 150 Bus. near Springfield; US 150 near Springfield; US 68 in Harrodsburg; US 127 in Harrodsburg US 127 Byp. near Harrodsburg
- East end: US 27 / Galilee Road near Bryantsville

Location
- Country: United States
- State: Kentucky
- Counties: Marion, Washington, Mercer, Garrard

Highway system
- Kentucky State Highway System; Interstate; US; State; Parkways
← KY 151	→ KY 153

Kentucky Route 152 (KY 152) is a 51.491-mile-long (82.867 km) state highway in Kentucky that runs from KY 49 north of Loretto to U.S. Route 27 (US 27) and Galilee Road north of Bryantsville via Springfield, Mackville, Harrodsburg, and Burgin.

KY 152 between Springfield and Harrodsburg was formerly a portion of U.S. Route 68.

== Major intersections ==
County	Location	mi	km	Destinations	Notes
Marion		0.000	0.000	KY 49 (Holy Cross Road)	Western terminus
Washington		8.438	13.580	KY 1183 west (Cissellville Road)	Eastern terminus of KY 1183
Washington		8.536	13.737	KY 429 south (St. Rose Lebanon Road)	Northern terminus of KY 429
Washington		10.202	16.419	US 150 Bus. west (Bardstown Road)	West end of US 150 Bus. overlap
Washington	Springfield	11.162	17.963	KY 55 north (Bloomfield Road)	West end of KY 55 overlap
Washington	Springfield	11.248	18.102	KY 55 south (Western Bypass) / KY 555 north (Triple Five Highway) to US 150 / Bluegrass Parkway	East end of KY 55 overlap; southern terminus of KY 555
Washington	Springfield	11.938	19.212	KY 528 (Cross Main)	
Washington	Springfield	12.025	19.352	KY 1584 north (Walnut Street) / Walnut Street	Southern terminus of KY 1584
Washington	Springfield	12.365	19.900	US 150 Bus. east (Perryville Road)	East end of US 150 Bus. overlap
Washington		13.199	21.242	US 150	
Washington		22.043	35.475	KY 438 west (Mayes Creek Road)	Eastern terminus of KY 438
Washington	Mackville	23.323	37.535	KY 433 north (Mackville-Willisburg Road)	Southern terminus of KY 433
Washington		25.390	40.861	KY 442 south (Deep Creek Road)	Northern terminus of KY 442
Mercer	No major junctions				
Washington	No major junctions				
Mercer		28.731	46.238	KY 1941 south	Northern terminus of KY 1941
Mercer	Harrodsburg	36.869	59.335	US 68 west (Perryville Street)	West end of US 68 overlap
Mercer	Harrodsburg	37.071	59.660	US 127 south (South College Street) / Mooreland Avenue	West end of US 127 overlap
Mercer	Harrodsburg	37.350	60.109	US 127 north (North College Street) / West Lexington Street	East end of US 127 overlap
Mercer	Harrodsburg	37.766	60.778	US 68 east (East Lexington Street) / Marimon Avenue	East end of US 68 overlap
Mercer		38.643	62.190	US 127 Byp.	
Mercer	Burgin	42.086	67.731	KY 33 (Danville Burgin Road / Pleasant Hill Drive)	
Garrard		48.972	78.813	KY 753 (Ballard Road / High Bridge Road)	
Garrard		51.491	82.867	US 27 (Lexington Road) / Galilee Road	Eastern terminus; continues as Galilee Road beyond US 27
1.000 mi = 1.609 km; 1.000 km = 0.621 mi: Concurrency terminus

Marion Co + US 150 Bus. Overlap + Washington County = 46.561
