= Mooresville, Kentucky =

Unincorporated community in Kentucky, United States

Mooresville
- Unincorporated community
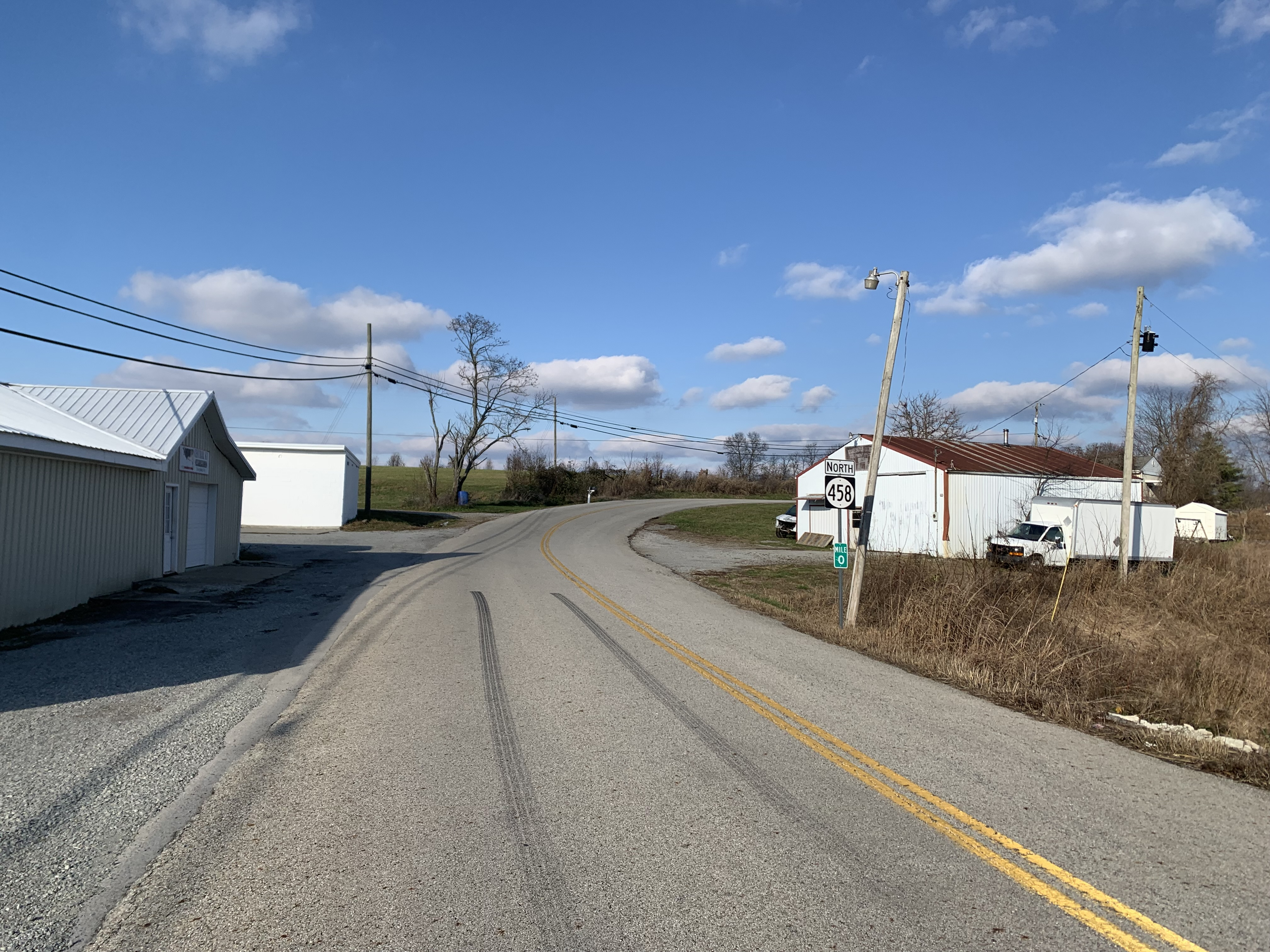
- Western terminus of Kentucky Highway 458 at Moorseville

- Location within the state of Kentucky Mooresville (the United States)
- Coordinates: 37°47′56″N 85°15′55″W
- Country: United States
- State: Kentucky
- County: Washington
- Elevation: 784 ft (239 m)
- Time zone: UTC-5 (Eastern (EST))
  - Summer (DST): UTC-4 (EST)
- GNIS feature ID: 498568

Mooresville is an unincorporated community located in Washington County, Kentucky, United States. Its post office is closed.

== Geography ==
Moorseville is located in northwest Washington County at the junction of Kentucky Route 55 and Kentucky Route 458.
