= Beech Fork =

Stream in central Kentucky, U.S.

Coordinates: 37°45′45″N 85°41′59″W

The Beech Fork, or Beech Fork River, is a 112-mile-long (180 km) river in central Kentucky in the United States. It is a tributary of the Rolling Fork of the Salt River, with its waters flowing eventually to the Ohio River and ultimately the Mississippi River.

The Beech Fork begins in eastern Marion County and heads northwest into Washington County, where the Chaplin River enters. The Beech Fork then turns southwest to go through Nelson County. At the end of the river's journey, near Boston, the Beech Fork flows into the Rolling Fork of the Salt River.

The Beech Fork at Bardstown has a mean annual discharge of 964 cubic feet per second.

The Beech Fork is a winding river that can be used for whitewater rafting, kayaking and canoeing. Most of the river is Class I and suitable for canoes and other entry level paddlers. A collapsed boulder dam one-quarter mile past the US 31E bridge constitutes a Class III+ run with an overall drop of five feet.

The Beech Fork Bridge, Mackville Road, a 124 feet (38 m) truss bridge spanning the river since 1884, is listed on the National Register of Historic Places.

It was spanned by the Mount Zion Covered Bridge until its collapse in 2021.

== See also ==
- List of rivers of Kentucky
