= Springfield, Kentucky =

- City
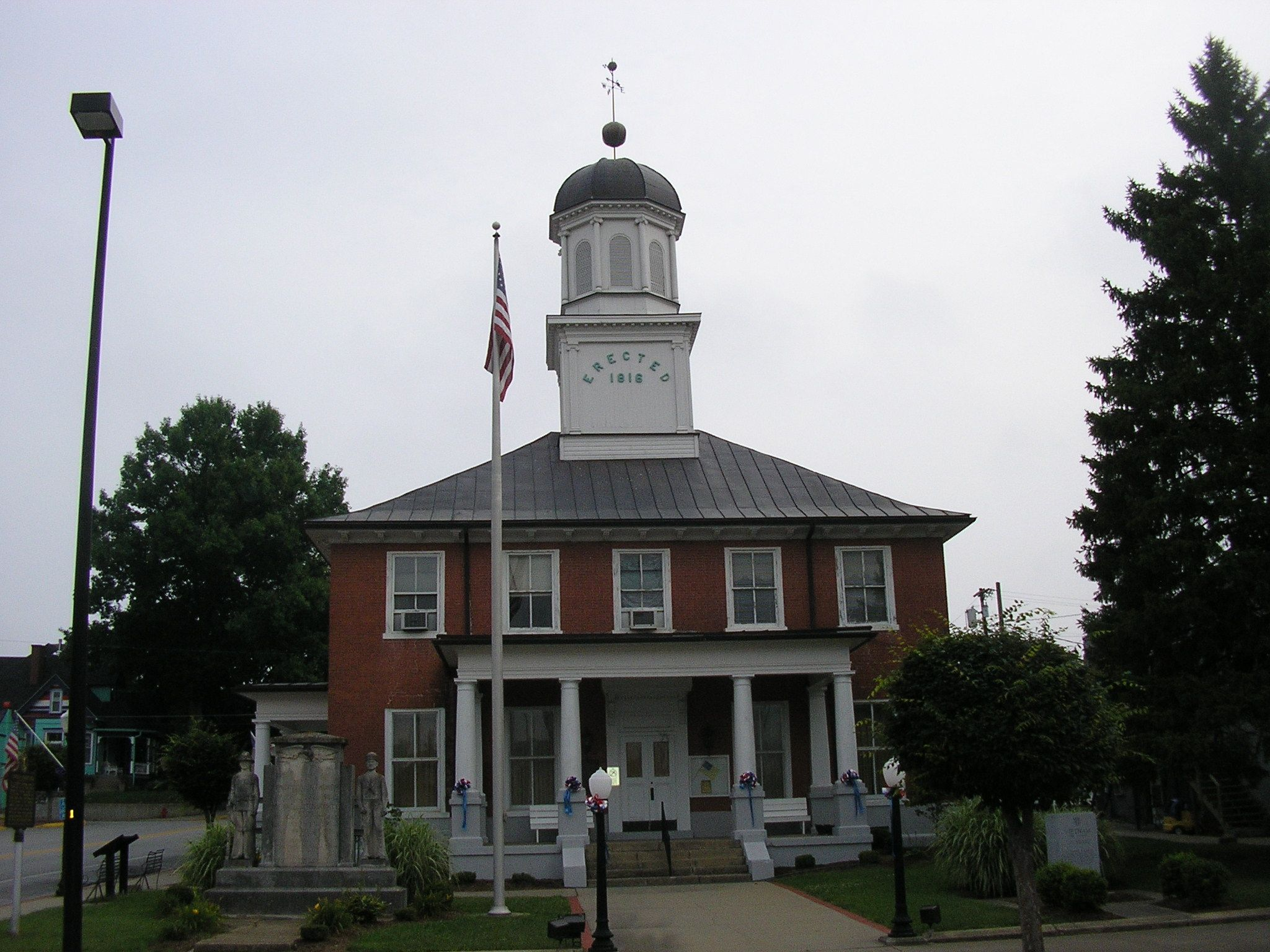
- Washington County courthouse in Springfield

- Seal
- Motto: "Where the Lincoln Legacy began"
- Location of Springfield in Washington County, Kentucky.
- Coordinates: 37°41′32″N 85°13′10″W
- Country: United States
- State: Kentucky
- County: Washington

Area
  - Total: 4.16 sq mi (10.78 km^{2})
  - Land: 4.12 sq mi (10.66 km^{2})
  - Water: 0.050 sq mi (0.13 km^{2})
- Elevation: 827 ft (252 m)

Population (2020)
  - Total: 2,846
  - Estimate (2024): 2,970
  - Density: 691.7/sq mi (267.08/km^{2})
- Time zone: UTC-5 (Eastern (EST))
  - Summer (DST): UTC-4 (EDT)
- ZIP code: 40069
- Area code: 859
- FIPS code: 21-72660
- GNIS feature ID: 2405510
- Website: www.springfieldky.org

Springfield is a home rule-class city in and the county seat of Washington County, Kentucky, United States. The population was 2,846 at the 2020 census.

== History ==
Springfield was established in 1793 and probably named for springs in the area.

The home of Senator John Pope, Richard Berry Jr. House and the Mordecai Lincoln House are historic houses in Springfield listed on the National Register of Historic Places.

Springfield, noted by filmmakers as Hollywood South, is the site of Kentucky's first and only movie sound stage. The Springfield Bonded Film Complex was established as a part of the development of Kentucky's film industry following the introduction of the state's film tax credit.

== Geography ==
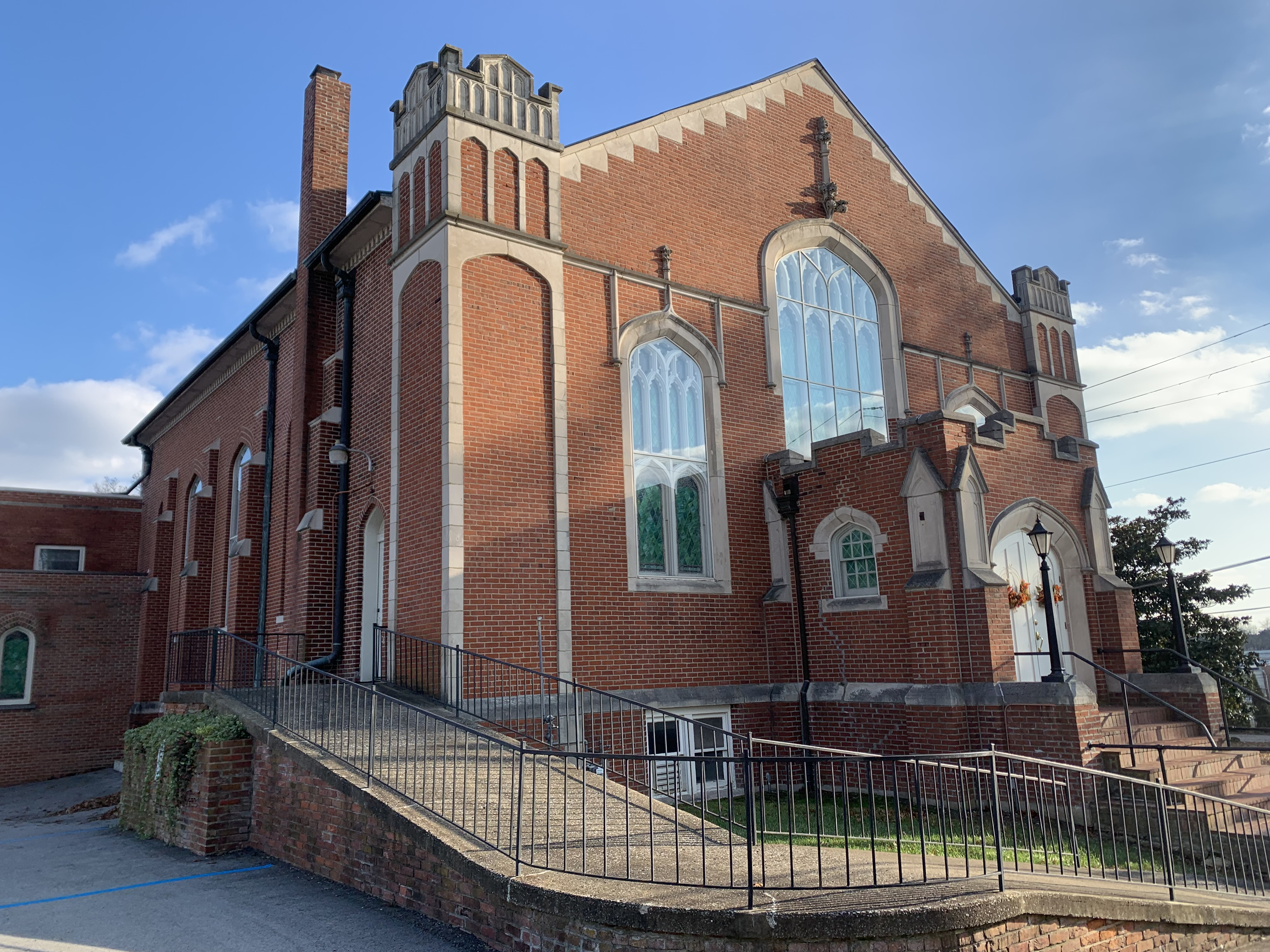
Springfield Baptist Church in Springfield

Springfield is located approximately 15 miles east of Bardstown, 10 miles north of Lebanon, and 17 miles west of Danville.

According to the United States Census Bureau, the city has a total area of 2.5 square miles (6.5 km^{2}), all land.

=== Climate ===
The climate in this area is characterized by hot, humid summers and generally mild to cool winters. According to the Köppen Climate Classification system, Springfield has a humid subtropical climate, abbreviated "Cfa" on climate maps.

== Demographics ==
Historical population
Census	Pop.	Note	%±
1800	164		—
1810	249		51.8%
1830	618		—
1840	598		−3.2%
1850	527		−11.9%
1860	497		−5.7%
1870	502		1.0%
1880	610		21.5%
1890	642		5.2%
1900	1,016		58.3%
1910	1,329		30.8%
1920	1,529		15.0%
1930	1,487		−2.7%
1940	1,767		18.8%
1950	2,032		15.0%
1960	2,382		17.2%
1970	2,961		24.3%
1980	3,179		7.4%
1990	2,875		−9.6%
2000	2,634		−8.4%
2010	2,519		−4.4%
2020	2,846		13.0%
2024 (est.)	2,970		4.4%
U.S. Decennial Census

=== 2020 census ===
As of the 2020 census, Springfield had a population of 2,846. The median age was 41.0 years. 23.1% of residents were under the age of 18 and 22.6% of residents were 65 years of age or older. For every 100 females there were 82.8 males, and for every 100 females age 18 and over there were 75.5 males age 18 and over.

0.0% of residents lived in urban areas, while 100.0% lived in rural areas.

There were 1,182 households in Springfield, of which 30.0% had children under the age of 18 living in them. Of all households, 33.7% were married-couple households, 19.1% were households with a male householder and no spouse or partner present, and 38.0% were households with a female householder and no spouse or partner present. About 37.3% of all households were made up of individuals and 16.5% had someone living alone who was 65 years of age or older.

There were 1,303 housing units, of which 9.3% were vacant. The homeowner vacancy rate was 2.8% and the rental vacancy rate was 8.0%.

Racial composition as of the 2020 census
Race	Number	Percent
White	2,037	71.6%
Black or African American	457	16.1%
American Indian and Alaska Native	13	0.5%
Asian	16	0.6%
Native Hawaiian and Other Pacific Islander	3	0.1%
Some other race	126	4.4%
Two or more races	194	6.8%
Hispanic or Latino (of any race)	210	7.4%

=== 2000 census ===
As of the census of 2000, there were 2,634 people, 1,166 households, and 711 families residing in the city. The population density was 1,048.5 per square mile (404.8/km^{2}). There were 1,239 housing units at an average density of 493.2/sq mi (190.4/km^{2}). The racial makeup of the city was 74.68% White, 22.40% African American, 0.53% Asian, 0.80% from other races, and 1.59% from two or more races. Hispanic or Latino of any race were 1.25% of the population.

There were 1,166 households, out of which 25.6% had children under the age of 18 living with them, 42.3% were married couples living together, 16.6% had a female householder with no husband present, and 39.0% were non-families. 37.2% of all households were made up of individuals, and 19.6% had someone living alone who was 65 years of age or older. The average household size was 2.20 and the average family size was 2.88.

21.8% of the population was under the age of 18, 7.7% from 18 to 24, 24.9% from 25 to 44, 22.7% from 45 to 64, and 22.9% who were 65 years of age or older. The median age was 42 years. For every 100 females, there were 78.3 males. For every 100 females age 18 and over, there were 72.9 males.

The median income for a household in the city was $24,430, and the median income for a family was $35,143. Males had a median income of $29,917 versus $21,865 for females. The per capita income for the city was $16,793. About 12.3% of families and 16.0% of the population were below the poverty line, including 16.6% of those under age 18 and 22.3% of those age 65 or over.

== Education ==
Springfield has a lending library, the Washington County Public Library.

== Notable people ==
- Lemuel Boulware, General Electric's vice president of labor and community relations from 1956 until 1961, whose policy of bargaining became known as "Boulwarism"
- Paul Derringer, MLB pitcher for the St. Louis Cardinals, Cincinnati Reds, and Chicago Cubs
- Shipwreck Kelly, NFL halfback for the New York Giants and Brooklyn Dodgers
- Nancy Hanks Lincoln, mother of U.S. President Abraham Lincoln
- Thomas Lincoln, father of U.S. President Abraham Lincoln
- Georgia Davis Powers, Kentucky state legislator and civil rights activist
- Elizabeth Madox Roberts, poet and novelist
- Phil Simms, NFL quarterback, MVP of Super Bowl XXI, television commentator
- Gabriel Caldwell Wharton Unionist, lawyer, and soldier in the 10th Kentucky during the War of Rebellion 1861-1865.
