= List of schools in Lexington, Kentucky =

Below is a listing of public and private schools for Lexington, Kentucky, USA.

== Public schools ==
The city is served by the Fayette County Public Schools district. The district serves all of Fayette County, which is coextensive with the city of Lexington.

=== Elementary schools ===
- Arlington Elementary School
- Ashland Elementary School
- Athens-Chilesburg Elementary School
- Booker T. Washington Academy
- Breckinridge Elementary School
- Brenda Cowan Elementary School
- Cardinal Valley Elementary School
- Cassidy Elementary School
- Clays Mill Elementary School
- Coventry Oak Elementary School
- Deep Springs Elementary School
- Dixie Elementary School
- Garden Springs Elementary School
- Garrett Morgan Elementary School
- Glendover Global Studies Elementary School
- Harrison Elementary School
- James Lane Allen Elementary School
- Julius Marks Elementary School
- Landsowne Elementary School
- Liberty Elementary School
- Mary Todd Elementary School
- Maxwell Spanish Immersion Magnet Elementary School
- Meadowthorpe Elementary School
- Millcreek Elementary School
- Northern Elementary School
- Picadome Elementary School
- Rosa Parks Elementary School
- Russell Cave Elementary School
- Sandersville Elementary School
- Southern Elementary School
- Squires Elementary School
- Stonewall Elementary School
- Tates Creek Elementary School
- Veterans Park Elementary School
- Wellington Elementary School
- William Wells Brown Elementary School
- Yates Elementary School

=== Middle schools ===
- Beaumont Middle School
- Bryan Station Traditional Magnet Middle School
- Crawford Middle School
- E.J. Hayes Middle School
- Jessie M. Clark Middle School
- Leestown Middle School
- Lexington Traditional Magnet School (LTMS)
- Morton Middle School
- Southern Middle School
- Tates Creek Middle School
- Winburn Middle School

=== 4-8 schools ===
- School for the Creative and Performing Arts at Bluegrass (SCAPA)

=== High schools ===
- Bryan Station High School
- Frederick Douglass High School
- Henry Clay High School
- Lafayette High School
- Locust Trace AgriScience Center
- Paul Laurence Dunbar High School
- Tates Creek High School
- Eastside Technical Center
- Southside Technical Center
- STEAM Academy

== Private schools ==
=== Elementary schools ===
- Community Montessori
- Lexington Christian Academy
- Lexington Montessori School
- The Lexington School
- Lexington Universal Academy
- Mars Hill Academy
- Providence Montessori
- Redwood Cooperative School
- Sayre School
- Saints Peter and Paul Regional Catholic School
- Trinity Christian Academy

=== Middle schools ===
- Blue Grass Baptist School
- Christ the King Catholic School
- Lexington Christian Academy
- The Lexington School
- Lexington Universal Academy
- Mars Hill Academy
- Mary Queen of the Holy Rosary Catholic School
- Redwood Cooperative School
- Saints Peter and Paul Regional Catholic School
- Sayre School
- Sphinx Academy
- Trinity Christian Academy

=== High schools ===
- Blue Grass Baptist School
- Lexington Christian Academy
- Lexington Catholic High School
- Mars Hill Academy
- Montessori High School of Kentucky
- Sayre School
- Sphinx Academy
- Trinity Christian Academy

== Area colleges and universities ==
- Asbury University (in Wilmore)
- Asbury Theological Seminary (in Wilmore)
- Berea College (in Berea)
- Bluegrass Community and Technical College
- Centre College (in Danville)
- Eastern Kentucky University (in Richmond)
- Georgetown College (in Georgetown)
- Indiana Wesleyan University (Lexington campus)
- Kentucky State University (in Frankfort)
- Lexington Theological Seminary
- National College
- Midway University (campuses in Midway and Lexington)
- Spencerian College
- Sullivan University
- Transylvania University
- University of Kentucky
