= Chase Minnifield =

American football player (born 1989)

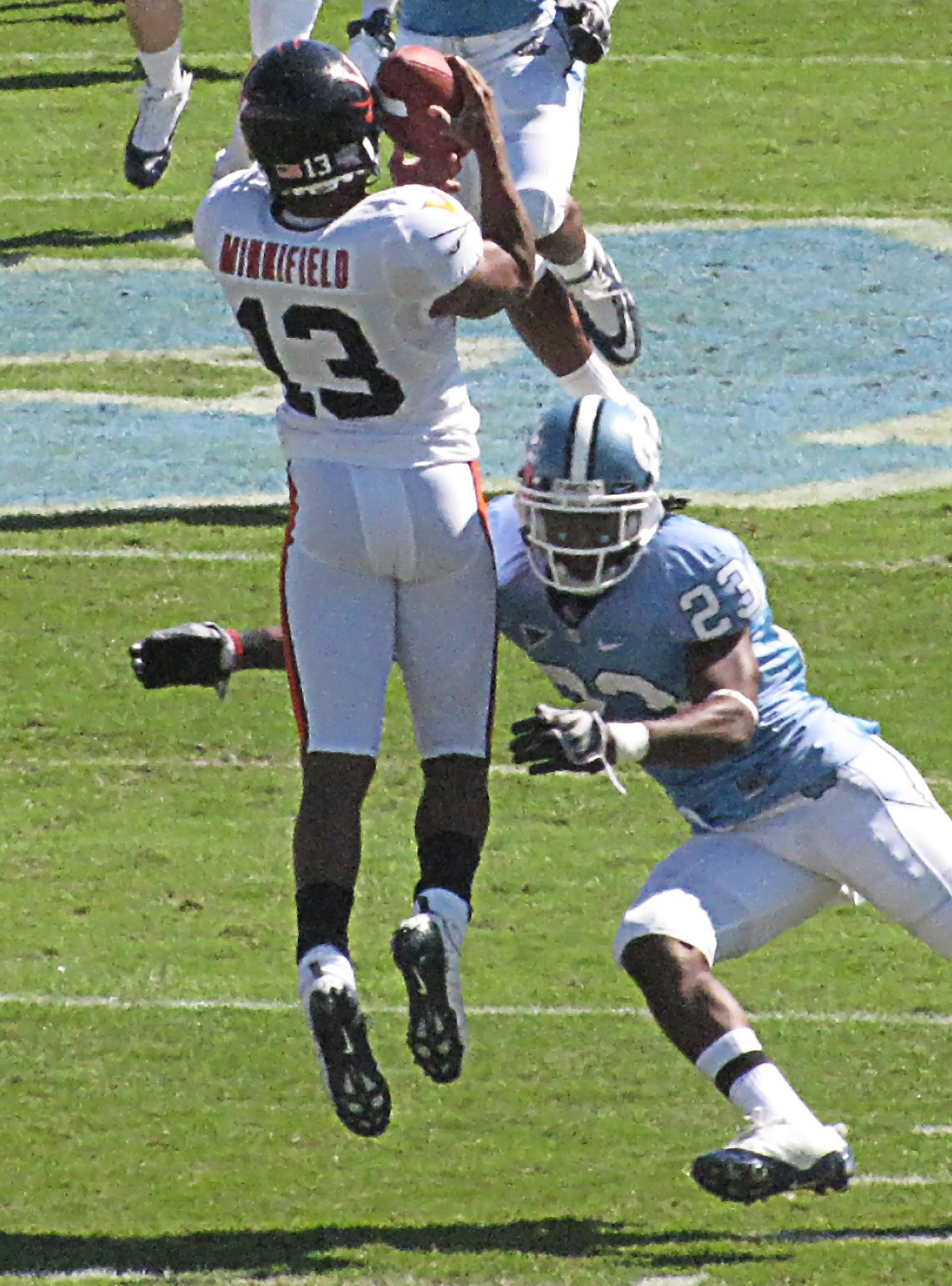
- Minnifield in a game against the UNC Tar Heels in 2009

No. 20
- Position: Cornerback

Personal information
- Born: March 31, 1989 (age 37); Lexington, Kentucky, U.S.
- Listed height: 6 ft 0 in (1.83 m)
- Listed weight: 185 lb (84 kg)

Career information
- High school: Henry Clay (Lexington)
- College: Virginia
- NFL draft: 2012: undrafted

Career history
- Washington Redskins (2012–2014)

Awards and highlights
- 2× First-team All-ACC (2010, 2011)

Career NFL statistics
- Total tackles: 4
- Stats at Pro Football Reference

Chase Onassis Minnifield (born March 31, 1989) is an American former professional football player who was a cornerback in the National Football League (NFL). Despite being projected as a third- or fourth-round pick, he was signed by the Washington Redskins as an undrafted free agent in 2012. He played college football for the Virginia Cavaliers.

== Early life ==
Minnifield attended Henry Clay High School in Lexington, Kentucky. He played defensive back, wide receiver, running back and quarterback. He also played on his high school basketball and baseball team.

== College career ==
Minnifield was redshirted in 2007. As a backup in 2008 and 2009, he had 53 tackles and four interceptions. During his first year as a starter in 2010, he had 48 tackles, six interceptions, and 0.5 sacks. Chase was ranked No. 2 in the ACC and No. 7 in the nation with six interceptions in the 2010 season and was selected as the "Jim Thorpe Defensive Back of the Week" Honor on two separate occasions his junior year. Chase acted as Virginia's main kick/punt return specialist from 2008 to 2010. In 2011, he was used less-frequently as a more "sure-handed" punt returner and was not used more often because of the risk of injury that comes from returning punts and Chase's value to the team.

In twelve games of the 2011 season, Minnifield had 50 tackles, three interceptions (one returned for a touchdown), and 1.5 sacks. Chase's outstanding defense and senior leadership helped lead the Cavaliers to an 8–5 season and Virginia's first bowl game since 2007.

== Professional career ==
=== 2012 NFL Combine ===
Pre-draft measurables
Height	Weight	Arm length	Hand span	40-yard dash	10-yard split	20-yard split	Vertical jump	Broad jump	Bench press
5 ft 10 in (1.78 m)	183 lb (83 kg)	31 1/2 in (0.80 m)	9 in (0.23 m)	4.63 s	1.53 s	2.64 s	32 1/2 in (0.83 m)	9 ft 9 in (2.97 m)	7 reps
Body measurements & bench from NFL Combine; All other values from Virginia Pro Day

=== Washington Redskins ===
Prior to the 2012 NFL draft, Minnifield was projected as third- or fourth-round pick. Although unselected, he was still viewed as one of the best undrafted rookies and received offers from five different NFL teams after the draft. Minnifield, with encouragement from his father, signed with the Washington Redskins on April 29, 2012, as an undrafted free agent. Still recovering from microfracture surgery, it was reported that he was placed on the physically unable to perform list before the start of training camp on July 18, 2012. On July 24, 2012, Minnifield was waived-injured by the team after tearing his anterior cruciate ligament. Due to not being claimed off waivers, he officially went to the team's injured reserve list.

The Redskins waived Minnifield on August 31, 2013, for final roster cuts before the start of 2013 season, but expressed interest in bringing back on their practice squad. The next day he was signed to the team's practice squad. On November 29, he was signed to the team's active roster.

The Redskins waived him on August 30, 2014, for final roster cuts before the start of the 2014 season. After clearing waivers, he was signed to the team's practice squad for the second time the following day. He was promoted to the active roster on September 22 after the Redskins placed DeAngelo Hall on injured reserve. After playing six games, the Redskins waived him on November 4 to make room for Leonard Hankerson on the active roster. The Redskins re-signed him to their practice squad two days later. He was promoted again to the active roster on November 26 after cornerback Tracy Porter was placed on injured reserve. On December 6, the Redskins placed him on injured reserve due to lingering symptoms from the concussion he suffered in Week 13 loss against the Indianapolis Colts. On December 16, the Redskins released Minnifield with an injury settlement.

== Personal life ==
Minnifield is the son of Frank Minnifield, who was also a cornerback.
