= Longest field goals =

Longest field goals may refer to:

- List of longest NFL field goals, American football
- List of longest gridiron football field goals, gridiron football
- List of longest NBA field goals, basketball
