= Paul Laurence Dunbar High School (Lexington, Kentucky) =

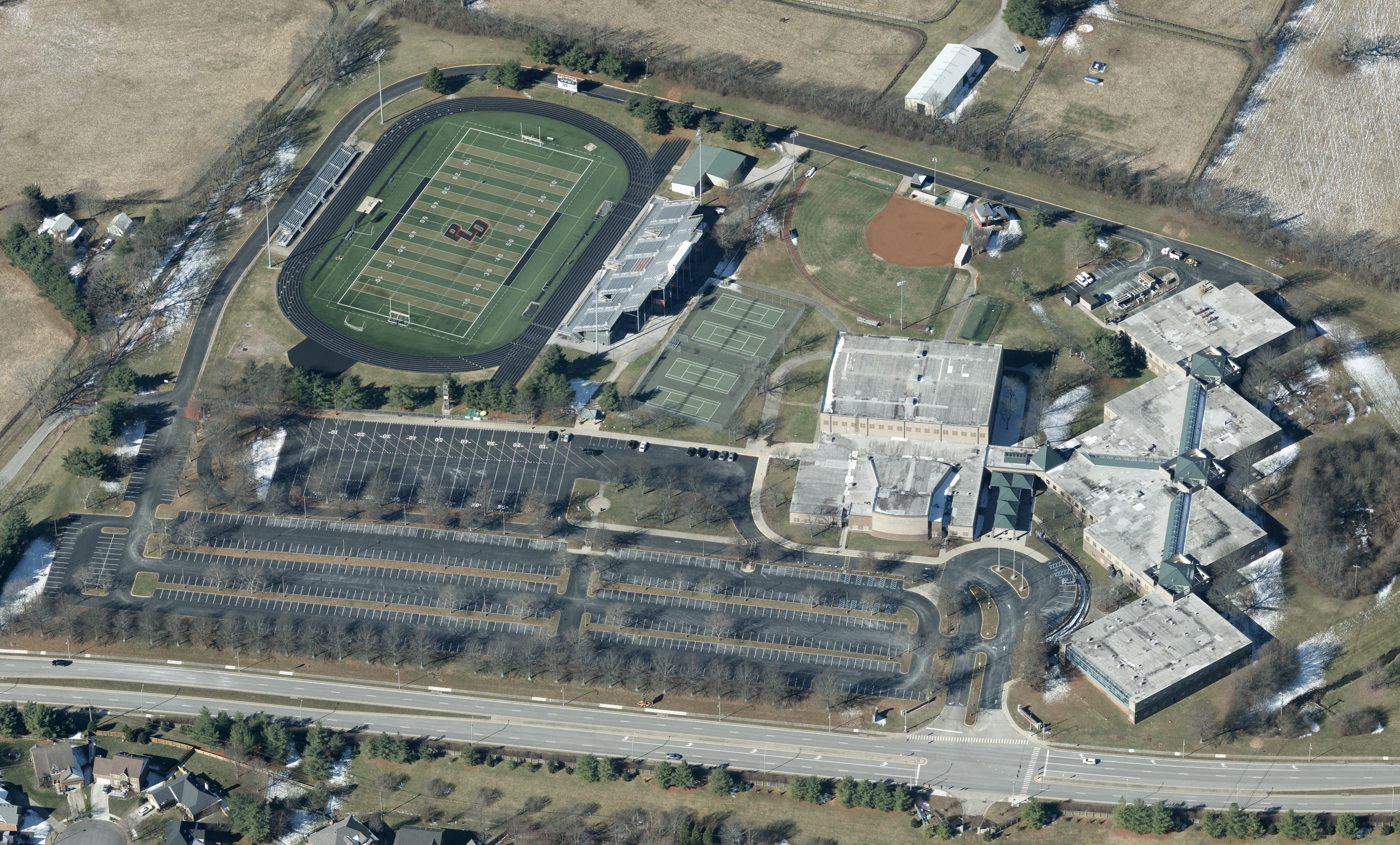

Location
- 1600 Man o' War Boulevard; Lexington, Fayette County, Kentucky 40513; United States; 38°01′04″N 84°34′37″W

Information
- Former name: Dunbar High School
- Type: Public high school
- Founded: 1990; 36 years ago
- Principal: Scott Loscheider
- Teaching staff: 111.00 (FTE)
- Grades: 9–12
- Enrollment: 1,889 (2023–2024)
- Student to teacher ratio: 17.02
- Area: Suburban
- Colors: Red; Black
- Mascot: Bulldog
- Website: pld.fcps.net

Paul Laurence Dunbar High School (also known as Dunbar High School, PLD, or PLDHS) is a public high school located on Man o' War Boulevard in the southwest of Lexington, Kentucky, United States.

The school was opened in 1990. With an enrollment of over 2100 students (in 2008–2009), it is one of the largest public high schools in Kentucky, and houses the Math, Science, and Technology Center program.

== Governance ==
The school is one of six high schools in the Fayette County Public Schools district.

== History ==
=== Pre-history (1922–1967) ===
The Dunbar High School was a segregated public high school for African-American students founded in 1922, and located at 545 North Upper Street in the Northside neighborhood in Lexington. It was named after the 19th century African-American poet and writer, Paul Laurence Dunbar, whose parents were from Kentucky. The Bearcats were the schools mascot, and the school colors were red and black (and green and white during the 1940s). In 1953, the Russell School, another segregated public school for African American students, was located on the same block and they shared a field.

When Fayette County's schools integrated, Dunbar High was closed in 1967, with its students being bused to four previously segregated white schools.

The building of the original high school at 545 North Upper Street has since been converted to the Dunbar Community Center, which serves myriad cultural, educational and recreational needs for the city of Lexington. The Dunbar Community Center is operated by the city's department of Parks and Recreation.

=== Paul Laurence Dunbar High School (1990) ===
The Paul Laurence Dunbar High School is a public high school opened in 1990 and located at 1600 Man o' War Boulevard in the southwestern part of Lexington. The school name was part of a political deal made in 1965 with the city's African-American community. The county school board agreed that the next high school to open in Lexington would bear Dunbar's name, principally at the urging of the Rev. William Augustus Jones Sr., minister of Lexington's oldest and largest Black church and a civil rights leader whose five oldest children had graduated from Dunbar and embarked on careers of distinction.

Both schools used the name Paul Laurence Dunbar High School and the Dunbar High School, but they are not the same school. The former school was frequently referred to as the "Dunbar High School". In an attempt to differentiated, the new school was given the poet's full name and is more frequently referred to by the full name.

As an additional tribute to the old Dunbar High School, the gymnasium was named the "S.T. Roach Sports Center" for basketball coach Sanford T. Roach, who led the school to a 512–142 record from 1942 to 1965, and is a member of the National High School Sports Hall of Fame and the Kentucky Athletic Hall of Fame.

The new PLD adopted the original school colors of the old Dunbar High (which were red and black, but changed to green and white during the 1940s). The new high school did not, however, retain the former school's "Bearcats" mascot. A vote of the school's future students shortly before the school's opening favored "Bulldogs" and selected "The Victors", by Louis Elbel, as the basis of the fight song.

== Curriculum ==
As of 2017, Dunbar offers Advanced Placement (AP) courses in twenty subject areas.

=== Math, Science, and Technology Center ===
The Math, Science, and Technology Center, also known as MSTC, is a magnet program housed in Paul Laurence Dunbar High School. The program accepts at least 55 students each year, selected from the 2500 incoming high school freshmen in Fayette County. MSTC alumni have matriculated into many top colleges across the country such as Yale University, Harvard University, Princeton University, and MIT. As of 2024, MSTC had an average weighted GPA of 4.659 and an average ACT score of 35.

== Sport and extracurricular activities ==
Many sports are played in the school, including football, basketball, soccer, baseball, softball, boys' lacrosse, tennis, golf, track and field, cheerleading, swimming, dancing, wrestling, and ice hockey. A wide range of other extracurricular activities is also offered.

=== American football ===
The first football playoff appearance was in 1995. For the first five and a half years, the PLD football team played their "home" games at other Lexington high schools. Midway through the 1999 season, PLD's football stadium opened, and that year the school advanced to the playoffs for the second time. In 1996 they were the AAA state runners-up, losing the championship game in overtime.

The football stadium was later named for Jon R. Akers, PLD's first principal and the father of National Football League placekicker David Akers.

=== Athletics ===
In 2005, the girls' track and field team tied as AAA state champions. Both the boys' and girls' teams have won the Lexington City Championships each year since 2000. The boys placed second in 2007 to Henry Clay High School in a loss by 3 points. The girls won Region 5 AAA in 2001, 2006, and 2007.

In cross country, Laura Steinmetz was the girls AAA individual state champion in 2005 and 2006. The girls team were AAA state champions in 2005 and placed third in 2006.

=== Baseball ===
In 2003, PLD Baseball were state champions. That year they also set a Kentucky record for the most wins in one season, winning 41 games and losing only 4. Josh Ellis went a perfect 12–0 in 2003, despite knee injury suffered in a PLD football game, and was named Kentucky's Mr. Baseball. Dunbar was once again state champions in 2007, where they finished with a 38–6 record, and a state record 1.32 ERA.

=== Basketball ===
PLD had a competitive boys' basketball program almost from the beginning. In 1993 the team, led by Darnell Burton, were State Runners-Up, and in 1994, led by Cameron Mills, the team repeated as State Runners-Up. In 1997 the team again reached the Sweet Sixteen, losing in the first round.

The Bulldogs boys basketball team captured the 2016 KHSAA Boys Sweet 16 Championship over Doss 61–52. PLD was led by tournament MVP Tavieon Hollingsworth.

=== Ice Hockey ===
Like lacrosse, ice hockey is not sanctioned by KHSAA. Dunbar's team began as a combination of travel and house league players in 2001, and are one of ten teams in the state of Kentucky. However, in 2002 the PLD Ice Hockey team went from being a "metro" team to a strictly all Dunbar student team with the help of PE/Health teacher Mr. Jonas. Dunbar ice hockey has played in both the "A" (varsity) and "B" (junior varsity) levels of Kentucky state hockey.

=== Lacrosse ===
Lacrosse is not sanctioned by the KHSAA. Dunbar's team went undefeated and won first place in the 2009 Bluegrass State Games, the first time lacrosse was included in the Games. In the 2011 season, the Dunbar lacrosse team broke a 7-year streak of losses to Lexington Catholic in the second round of the state tournament. They went 12–2 and concluded their season with a 9–7 victory over Ballard in the D-II Championship game. In 2015 the lacrosse team was runner up, losing to Henry Clay in the Championship Game.

=== Swimming ===
The Swim Team has one state championship, which was won with the 2001 girls team. They have won the combined team state championships 6 times: in 2001, 2002, 2003, 2021, 2022, and 2023. Dunbar has dominated their region winning multiple region titles. In 2016, PLD was runner up in team scores at the KHSAA Swimming and Diving Championships. This is a strong sport at the high school with the multiple regional titles and the 5 star elite athletes.

=== Soccer ===
Dunbar has 6 state championships in soccer. In 1992, 2001, 2005 and 2013 PLD Soccer were the State Champions. The first four championships were under Todd Bretz, who was the head coach since the program's inception with one of the highest records of any Kentucky high school soccer coaches (493–169–38), until Fayette County schools sidelined him in September 2019. Zach Byrd also won a Kentucky Mr. Soccer in 2010 when Dunbar lost in the elite eight against Henry Clay. Dunbar won back to back state championships in 2021 and 2022 under coach James Wray.

=== Quizzes ===
The school is well known for its academic and quiz teams.

In 1998, the academic team won their first Governor's Cup State Tournament. Both from 2000 to 2003 and from 2007 to 2010, the team won 4 back-to-back state championships. Shortly afterward, the team won Governor's Cup twice in 2012 and 2013. After placing 2nd in 2021 and 3rd in both 2022 and 2023, the team ended a decade-long drought and won the Governor's Cup State Championship in 2024. In the 2024 KAAC state tournament, they also won the Quick Recall State Championship, marking the first time since 2011 that they were Quick Recall State champions.

The quiz bowl team were state champions in multiple years (2008–2011, 2013–2014, 2019, 2023–2024). In 2024, Dunbar became the first team from Kentucky in almost 15 years to place in the top 10 at the NAQT High School National Championship Tournament.

In 2000, Dunbar's United States Academic Decathlon team won the state division for the first time and proceeded to nationals.

=== Music ===
The Paul Laurence Dunbar band has earned national acclaim; they are one of a handful of high school band programs to receive the Sudler Shield award twice for outstanding high school marching band. The Dunbar band earned the title of state champion in years 1991 (Class AAA), 2003 and 2004 (Class AAAA), and 2005, 2007, 2010, and 2011 (Class AAAAA), and State Runners-Up in 1992, 1994, 1995, and 2002 (Class AAAA), and 2006 and 2008 (Class AAAAA). The band was a finalist in 1993, 1996–1999, 2001 (AAAA), 2009, and 2012–2015 (AAAAA).

The band performed twice in the Macy's Thanksgiving Day Parade in New York City: first in 2007 and again in 2014.

=== Cheerleading ===
PLD Cheerleading is nationally competitive. They have been UCA National Champions in the Large Varsity Division (all girls) in 1995, 2004–2008, 2011 and 2013. They are the only squad to ever be national champions five times in a row. They were UCA National Runners-Up in 1994, 2002, 2003, 2017 and Third Place in 1993 and 2009, Cheersports National Champions in 2003, KAPOS State Champions in 1994, 1997, 2000–2013, and KHSAA State Champions in 2016 and 2017.

They have been nationally ranked for twelve years and have been featured in American Cheerleader magazine.

In 2001, MTV's True Life series prominently featured Dunbar's cheerleading team in the episode "I'm a Cheerleader." On November 28, 2005, Lifetime Television announced a reality series featuring the PLD cheerleaders, and "Cheerleader Nation" premiered in early 2006.

== Notable alumni ==
Sport

- Sean Kelley (2002–06) – former professional footballer for Orlando City SC. Known as Kentucky's Mr. Soccer, he was an NSCAA HS All-American, and the Gatorade Player of the Year as a senior, while leading his team to a state championship.
- Lee Kiefer (2009–2012) – Olympic gold medal-winning fencer
- A. J. Ellis (1995–99) – former baseball player for the Los Angeles Dodgers

Arts and media

- Kelly Pratt (1992–1996) – trumpet player, composer
- Gil Duran – California opinion editor for The Sacramento Bee and the former Press Secretary for California governor Jerry Brown.
- Saida Grundy – opinion columnist for The Guardian and Boston University professor

== See also ==
- Douglass School (Lexington, Kentucky)
- Russell School (Lexington, Kentucky)
- Lafayette High School (Lexington, Kentucky)
