= Walker Parks =

American football player (born 2001)

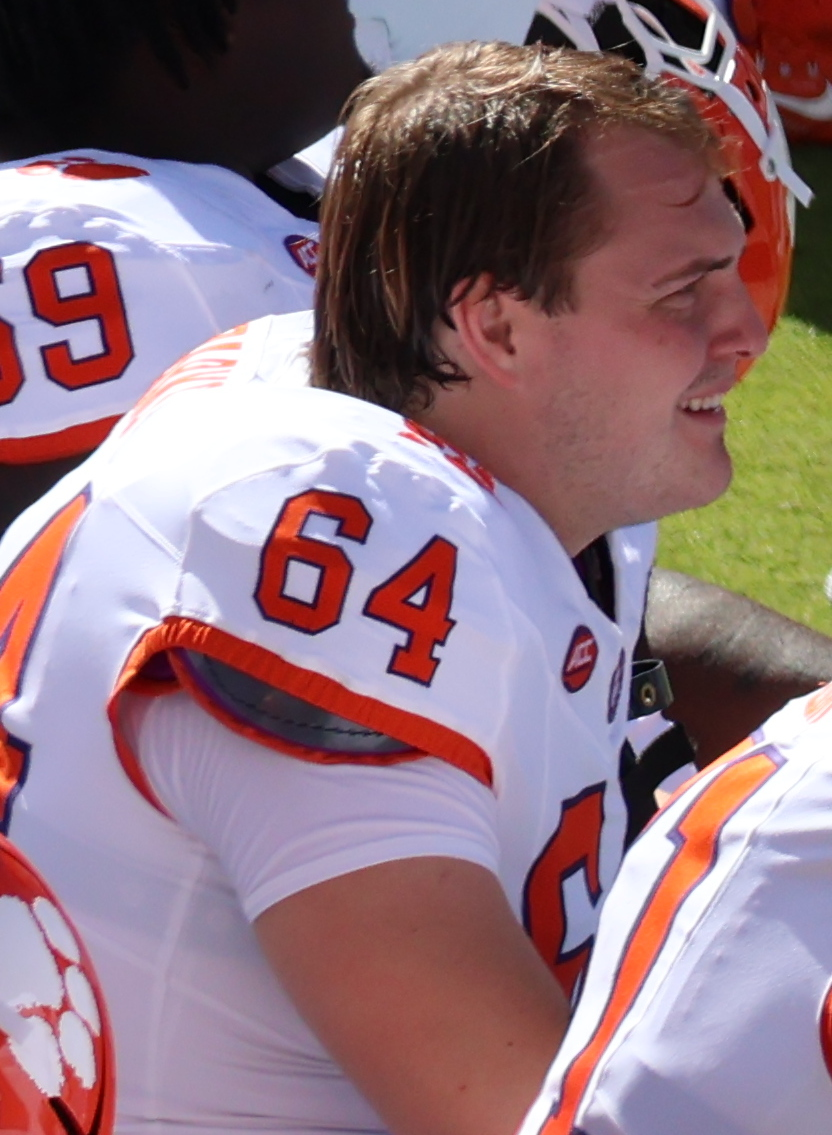
- Parks with the Clemson Tigers in 2025

No. 64 – Clemson Tigers
- Position: Offensive guard
- Class: Graduate student

Personal information
- Born: October 19, 2001 (age 25)
- Listed height: 6 ft 5 in (1.96 m)
- Listed weight: 309 lb (140 kg)

Career information
- High school: Frederick Douglass (Lexington, Kentucky)
- College: Clemson (2020–2025)

Awards and highlights
- Third-team All-ACC (2024)
- Stats at ESPN

Walker Parks (born October 19, 2001) is an American college football offensive lineman for the Clemson Tigers.

== Early life ==
Parks attended high school at Frederick Douglass located in Lexington, Kentucky. Coming out of high school, he was rated as a four star recruit, the 2nd overall player in the State of Kentucky, and the 22nd overall offensive tackle in the class of 2020, where he committed to play college football for the Clemson Tigers over offers from others schools such as Notre Dame, Virginia Tech, Kentucky, Louisville, Northwestern, Purdue, Cincinnati, and Vanderbilt.

== College career ==
During his freshman season in 2020, he played in 11 games. Parks took over as a starter for the Tigers in 2021, where he started every game in the 2021 and 2022 season. In week two of the 2023 season, Parks suffered a season ending lower body injury in a loss to Florida State, after just two starts. Parks returned in 2024 and entered the season on the Tiger's starting offensive line. He finished the 2024 season, starting in all 14 games, where after the season he announced his return to Clemson for his final season of eligibility.

== Professional career ==
Pre-draft measurables
| Height | Weight | Arm length | Hand span | Wingspan | 40-yard dash | 10-yard split | 20-yard split | 20-yard shuttle | Three-cone drill | Vertical jump | Broad jump | Bench press |
|---|---|---|---|---|---|---|---|---|---|---|---|---|
| 6 ft 4 5/8 in (1.95 m) | 309 lb (140 kg) | 31 7/8 in (0.81 m) | 10 1/4 in (0.26 m) | 6 ft 7 3/8 in (2.02 m) | 5.12 s | 1.77 s | 2.94 s | 4.83 s | 7.93 s | 22.5 in (0.57 m) | 8 ft 3 in (2.51 m) | 31 reps |
All values from Pro Day
