= Fayette County Public Schools (Kentucky) =

School district in Kentucky, United States

Address
- 701 East Main Street Lexington, Kentucky, 40502; United States

District information
- Type: Public
- Grades: PreK–12
- Superintendent: Bill Bradford
- Budget: Revenue: US$617.5 MM (2018–19); Expenditures: US$585.9 MM (2018–19)
- NCES District ID: 2101860

Students and staff
- Students: 41,415 (2021–22)
- Teachers: 3,074.72 (FTE) (2021–22)
- Staff: 3,026.00 (FTE) (2021–22)
- Student–teacher ratio: 13.47:1 (2021–2022)

Other information
- Website: fcps.net

Fayette County Public Schools is a school district based in Lexington, Kentucky (U.S.).

The district serves all of Fayette County, which is coextensive with the city of Lexington.

== Administration ==
=== Superintendent ===
- Dr. Bill Bradford (Still not confirmed just yet.)

=== Other administrators ===
- Tanya Dailey, Executive Assistant

=== Board of education ===
The Fayette County Board of Education consists of members elected to four year terms from five districts, as well as the Superintendent. Districts 1, 3, and 5 hold elections in presidential election years, while Districts 2, and 4 hold elections in mid-term years.

The board holds two meetings each month, both open to the public. The first meeting of the month is an agenda planning meeting, while official action is taken at the second meeting. The second meeting of each month is televised locally on cable channel 197 and streamed on the district's website.

==== School Board members ====
- Monica Mundy
- Tyler Murphy (chair)
- Penny Christian
- Amanda Ferguson
- Amy Green (Vice Chair)

== Schools ==
=== Secondary schools ===
==== High schools ====
- The Steam Academy
- Henry Clay High School
- Bryan Station High School
- Paul Laurence Dunbar High School
- Frederick Douglass High School
- Lafayette High School
- Tates Creek High School
- Eastside Technical Center
- Southside Technical Center
- Locust Trace AgriScience Center (Program)
- Opportunity Middle College

==== Middle schools ====
- Beaumont Middle School
- Bryan Station Middle School
- E.J. Hayes Middle School
- Jessie Clark Middle School
- Leestown Middle School
- Lexington Traditional Magnet School
- Mary E Britton Middle School
- Morton Middle School
- Southern Middle School
- Tates Creek Middle School
- Winburn Middle School
- Crawford Middle School

==== Combined middle/high schools ====
- Carter G. Woodson Academy — An all-boys college preparatory program for grades 6–12, aimed mainly at minority students. The program was formerly housed at Crawford Middle School, but is now at Frederick Douglass High School.
- Martin Luther King Jr. Academy

=== 4-8 schools ===
- School for the Creative and Performing Arts (SCAPA)

=== Primary schools ===
- Athens- Chilesburg Elementary School
- Breckinridge Elementary School
- Brenda Cowan Elementary School
- Arlington Elementary School
- Ashland Elementary School
- Cardinal Valley Elementary School
- Cassidy Elementary School
- Clays Mill Elementary School
- Coventry Oak Elementary School
- Deep Springs Elementary School
- Dixie Elementary School
- Garden Springs Elementary School
- Garrett Morgan Elementary School
- George Washington Carver STEM Academy
- Glendover Elementary School
- Harrison Elementary School
- James Lane Allen Elementary School
- Lansdowne Elementary School
- Liberty Elementary School
- Julius Marks Elementary School
- Maxwell Elementary School
- Meadowthorpe Elementary School
- Millcreek Elementary School
- Northern Elementary School
- Rosa Parks Elementary School
- Picadome Elementary School
- Russell Cave Elementary School
- Sandersville Elementary School
- Southern Elementary School
- Stonewall Elementary School
- Tates Creek Elementary School
- Mary Todd Elementary School
- Veterans Park Elementary School
- Booker T. Washington Elementary School
- Wellington Elementary School
- William Wells Brown Elementary School
- Yates Elementary School
- Squires Elementary School
- Providence Montessori School

== Magnet programs ==
FCPS offers many magnet programs with varying entrance requirements.

=== Magnets without entrance criteria ===
- Dixie Elementary Individually Prescribed Education
- Maxwell Spanish Immersion

=== Magnets with entrance criteria ===
- Ashland Elementary Accelerated Cluster
- Bryan Station High School Information Technology (IT) Academy
- Liberal Arts Academy at Henry Clay High School
- Math, Science, and Technology Center at Paul Laurence Dunbar High
- Meadowthorpe Elementary Accelerated Cluster
- Pre-Engineering at Lafayette High
- SCAPA Bluegrass (Located on the same campus as Lafayette High)
- Winburn Middle Accelerated Cluster

=== Lottery magnets with entrance criteria ===
- Bryan Station Traditional Middle
- Lexington Traditional Magnet School (LTMS)
