= Graham Gano =

Scottish-American football player (born 1987)

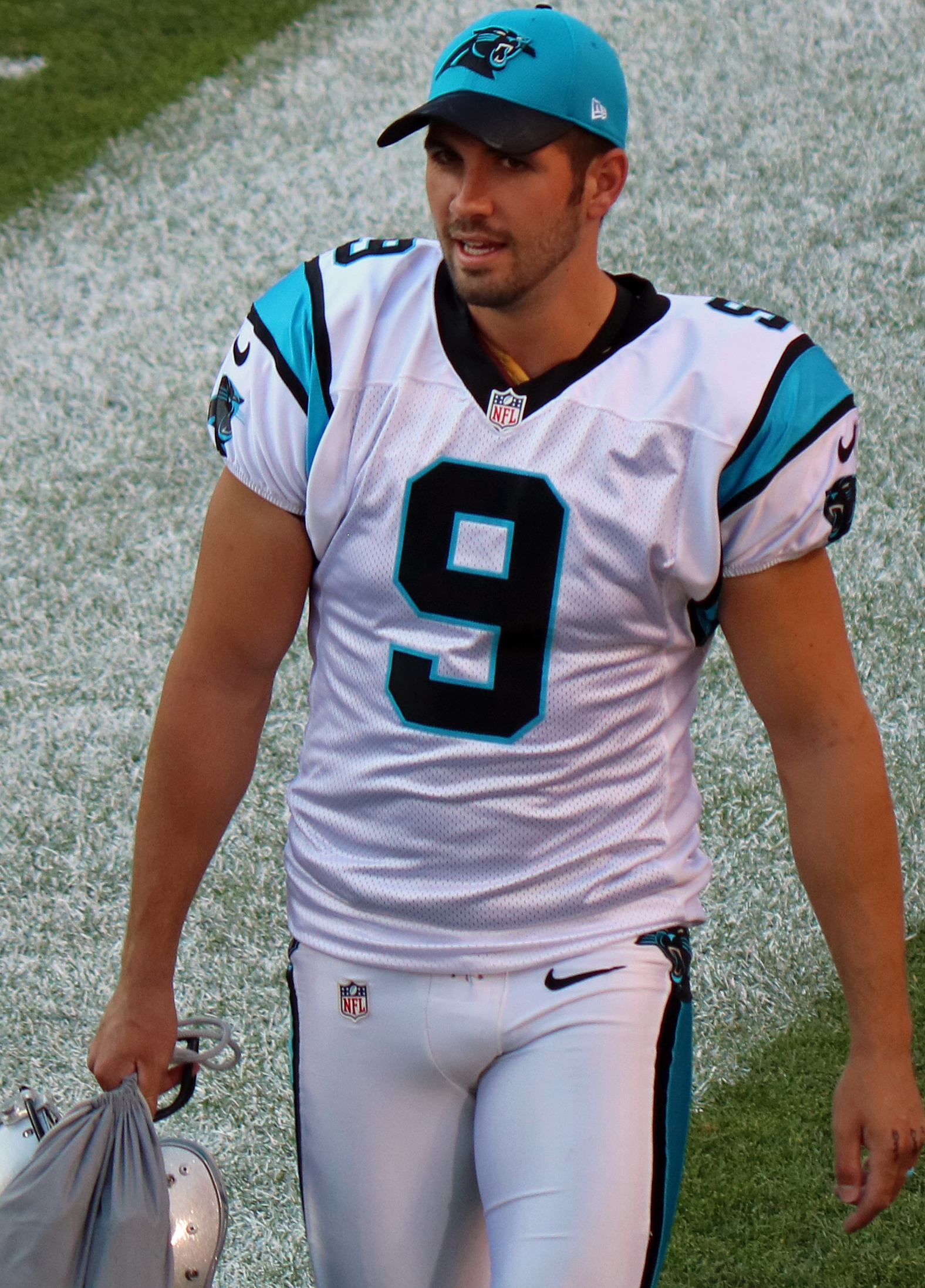
- Gano with the Carolina Panthers in 2016

Profile
- Position: Placekicker

Personal information
- Born: April 9, 1987 (age 39); Arbroath, Scotland
- Listed height: 6 ft 2 in (1.88 m)
- Listed weight: 202 lb (92 kg)

Career information
- High school: J. M. Tate (Cantonment, Florida, U.S.)
- College: Florida State (2005–2008)
- NFL draft: 2009: undrafted

Career history
- Baltimore Ravens (2009)*; Las Vegas Locomotives (2009); Washington Redskins (2009–2011); Carolina Panthers (2012–2019); New York Giants (2020–2025)
- * Offseason or practice squad member only

Awards and highlights
- Pro Bowl (2017); UFL champion (2009); Lou Groza Award (2008); Second-team All-American (2008); First-team All-ACC (2008); NFL record: Longest made field goal in playoffs: 58 (2017, tied with Pete Stoyanovich)

Career NFL statistics as of 2025
- Field goals made: 342
- Field goals attempted: 408
- Field goal percentage: 83.8%
- Longest field goal: 63
- Extra points made: 408
- Extra points attempted: 427
- Extra point percentage: 95.6%
- Points scored: 1,434
- Stats at Pro Football Reference

Graham Gano (gə-NOH; born April 9, 1987) is a Scottish–American professional football placekicker. He played college football for the Florida State Seminoles and was signed by the Baltimore Ravens as an undrafted free agent in 2009. Gano has also played for the Las Vegas Locomotives in the United Football League (UFL), the Washington Redskins, New York Giants, and Carolina Panthers. During his time with the Panthers, he achieved the franchise's record for longest field goal at 63 yards in 2018.

== Early life ==
Gano was born in a military base in Arbroath, Scotland and is of Scottish descent through his mother. His father, Mark, was a United States Navy Master Chief Petty Officer and Vietnam veteran who was stationed at Canadian Forces Base, Gander, Newfoundland when Gano was born. Gano has a long line of ancestors who served in the military, including his great grandfather Richard Gano, and grandfather Raymond of Martinsburg, West Virginia. Gano grew up in Cantonment, Florida, near Pensacola, Florida and attended J. M. Tate High School, where he was a two-sport star in football and track. In high school football, he was an All-American First-team selection by USA Today and the nation's third-ranked kicker by Rivals.com. Gano played in the CaliFlorida All-Star game, completing a 50-yard field goal in the game. During his senior season, Gano kicked three field goals over 55 yards (57, 64, and 65 yards) and had a 71-yard field goal made which was negated by a penalty. A total of 36 of his 38 kickoffs were touchbacks and he averaged better than 42 yards per punt as a senior.

As a standout track & field athlete, Gano was one of the state's top performers in the sprinting events. He captured three state titles in track at the 2005 FHSAA 3A District 1, winning the 100-meter dash, with a time of 10.55 seconds, the 200-meter dash, with a time of 21.70 seconds, and the 400-meter dash, with a time of 48.00 seconds.

== College career ==
Gano attended Florida State University from 2005 to 2008, playing as a kicker and punter for the Florida State Seminoles.

During his senior year in 2008, Gano finished first in the FBS for field goals made, percentage of field goals converted and 50-yard field goals made, and was the Lou Groza Award winner as the nation's top kicker. He was one of only two kickers in college to make over 90% of his field goal attempts in the 2008 season. He was the highest scoring kicker in America and fourth overall in the FBS in scoring. He was a Rivals.com, Scout.com, and CBS Sports first-team All-American. Gano was listed as Walter Camp, Associated Press, Sporting News, SI.com, and Phil Steele second-team All-American. He earned All-Atlantic Coast Conference (ACC) First-team honors as well.

Gano was four-time ACC Specialist of the Week for his kicking performances against NC State, Virginia Tech, Clemson, and Maryland. He also was a two-time Lou Groza Star of the Week honoree for his performances in Florida State's victories over NC State and Clemson. He was named offensive special teams player of the year for the Seminoles as selected by the Florida State coaching staff. He led the ACC in field goals per game with a career-high 2.2 field goals per game average. Gano has the highest field goal percentage in the ACC; in 2008, he made 92.3 percent of his field goal attempts (24 of 26) and led the league in field goals made with 24. He was also the ACC's leading scorer with 105 points and a 9.5 points per game average. Gano is the only kicker in FSU history to convert over 90% of his field goals in a season. He is one of only two punters ever to be named the MVP of a bowl game, when he was named the Most Valuable Player in the 2008 Champs Sports Bowl. He holds the Seminoles single season record for 50+-yard field goals, completing five straight attempts from 50 yards or longer. Despite only kicking for one season, Gano finished second in career 50-yard field goals at FSU behind two time Lou Groza Award winner Sebastian Janikowski.

== Professional career ==
Pre-draft measurables
Height	Weight	Arm length	Hand span
6 ft 0 3/8 in (1.84 m)	194 lb (88 kg)	30 3/8 in (0.77 m)	7 7/8 in (0.20 m)
All values from NFL Combine

=== Baltimore Ravens ===
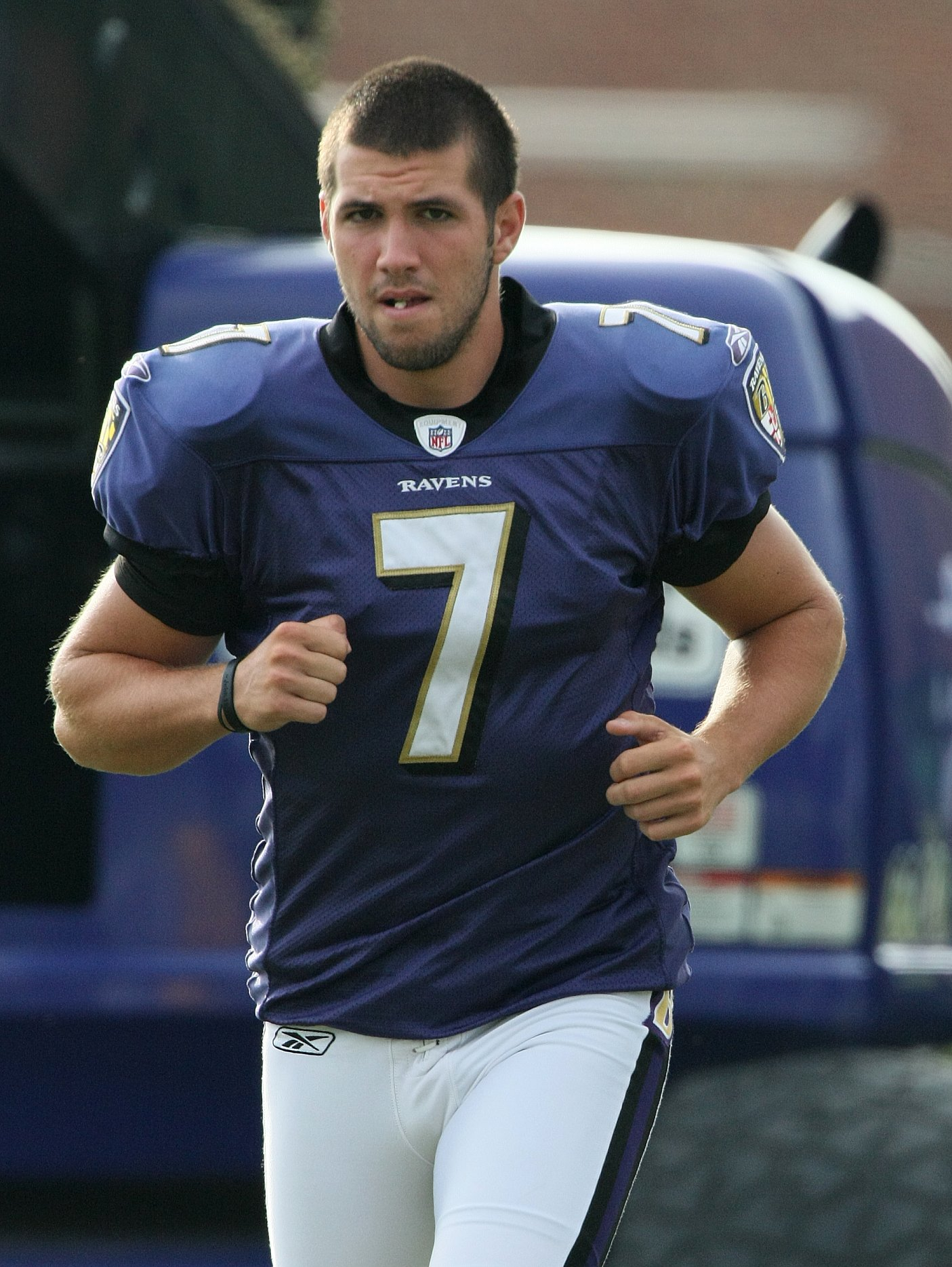
Gano at Ravens training camp in 2009

Gano signed with the Baltimore Ravens as an undrafted free agent immediately after the 2009 NFL draft. After the Ravens named Steve Hauschka as their kicker, they waived Gano on September 5.

=== Las Vegas Locomotives ===
Gano was signed by the Las Vegas Locomotives of the United Football League after being cut by the Ravens. He earned the first points for the league after converting a 32-yard field goal, and hit a then-UFL record long field goal of 53 yards. He was responsible for the winning field goal which gave the Locomotives the first ever UFL championship. He finished the season leading the league in scoring and field goals made.

=== Washington Redskins ===
==== 2009 season ====
On December 8, 2009, Gano was signed by the Washington Redskins, replacing veteran Shaun Suisham. He successfully connected on his first career NFL field goal attempt, a 46-yard attempt against the Oakland Raiders on December 13, 2009. He appeared in three games in the 2009 season.

==== 2010 season ====
Gano continued to play for the Redskins in the 2010 season. He cemented his status as a clutch kicker for the Redskins by contributing to three overtime game-winning field goals when playing against the Green Bay Packers, Tennessee Titans, and Jacksonville Jaguars. Gano earned NFC Special Teams Player of the Week for his game against Jacksonville. In the 2010 season, Gano converted all 28 extra point attempts and 24 of 35 field goal attempts.

Due to Gano's inconsistency in the 2010 season, the Redskins brought Shayne Graham to compete. After a good performance in the preseason and horrible performance by Graham in the first preseason game, Gano was kept on the final roster before the start of the new season.

==== 2011 season ====
In Week 9 against the San Francisco 49ers in the 2011 season, he kicked a 59-yard field goal, which broke the Redskins' franchise record of 57 yards. At the end of the season, he made 31 of 41 field goal attempts with five of the ten misses being blocked kicks.

==== 2012 season ====
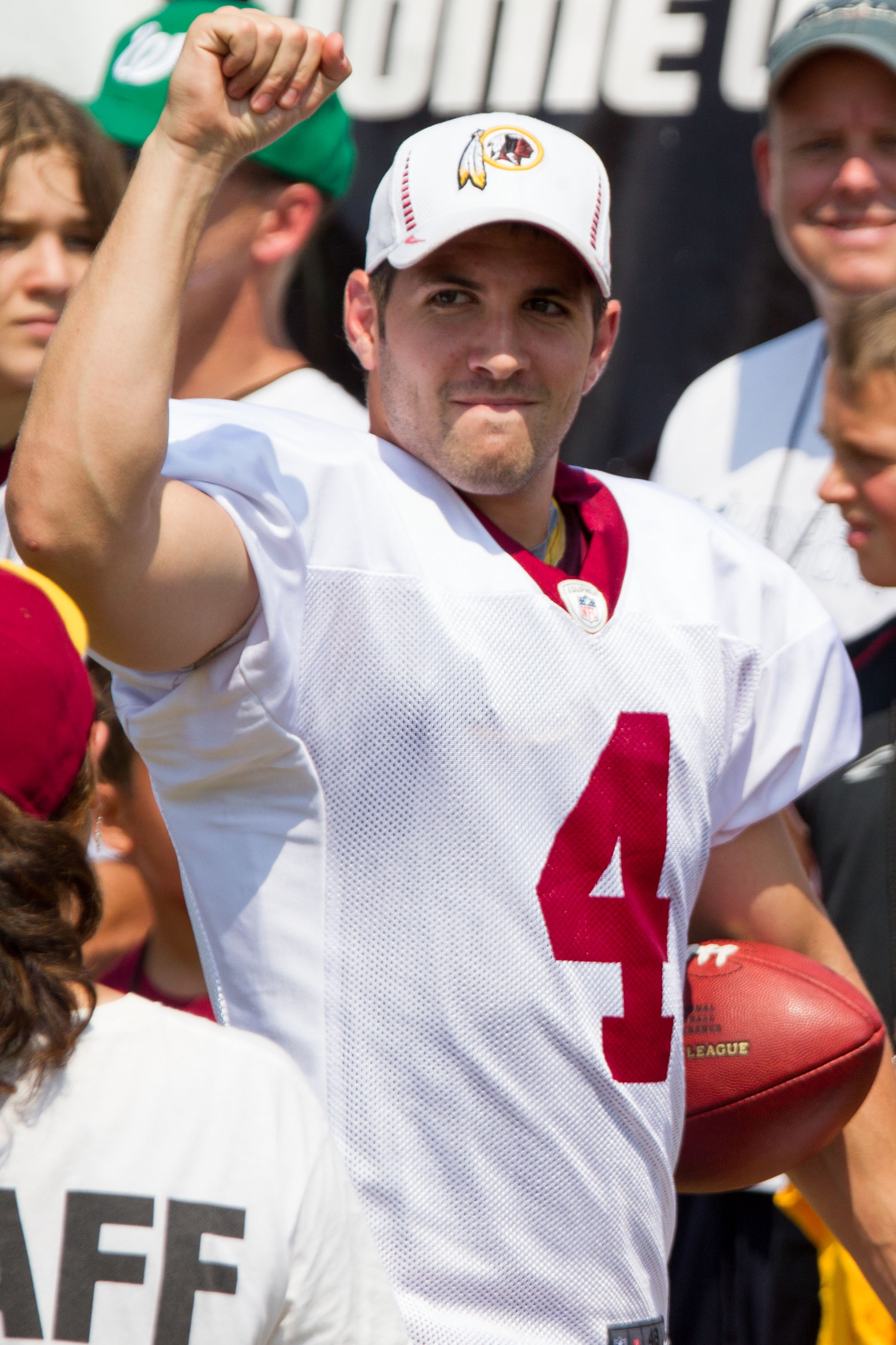
Gano at Redskins training camp in 2012

On March 3, 2012, the Redskins tendered a contract with Gano establishing exclusive negotiating rights and guaranteeing him a league minimum salary. He was once again forced to compete for his job after the team signed Neil Rackers. Originally it seemed that once again, Gano kept his spot on the Redskins' roster after Rackers was cut by the team on August 27. In a surprise transaction by the Redskins, Gano was released the next day after the team signed veteran Billy Cundiff.

=== Carolina Panthers ===
==== 2012 season ====
On November 20, 2012, Gano was signed by the Carolina Panthers, replacing Justin Medlock. He played in the last six games of the season under head coach Ron Rivera and converted nine out of eleven field goal attempts.

==== 2013 season ====
In the 2013 season, Gano converted all 42 extra point attempts and 24 of 27 field goal attempts.

==== 2014 season ====
On February 28, 2014, it was announced that Gano had signed a new four-year contract with the Panthers worth $12.4 million. He converted all 34 extra point attempts and 29 of 35 field goal attempts.

==== 2015 season ====
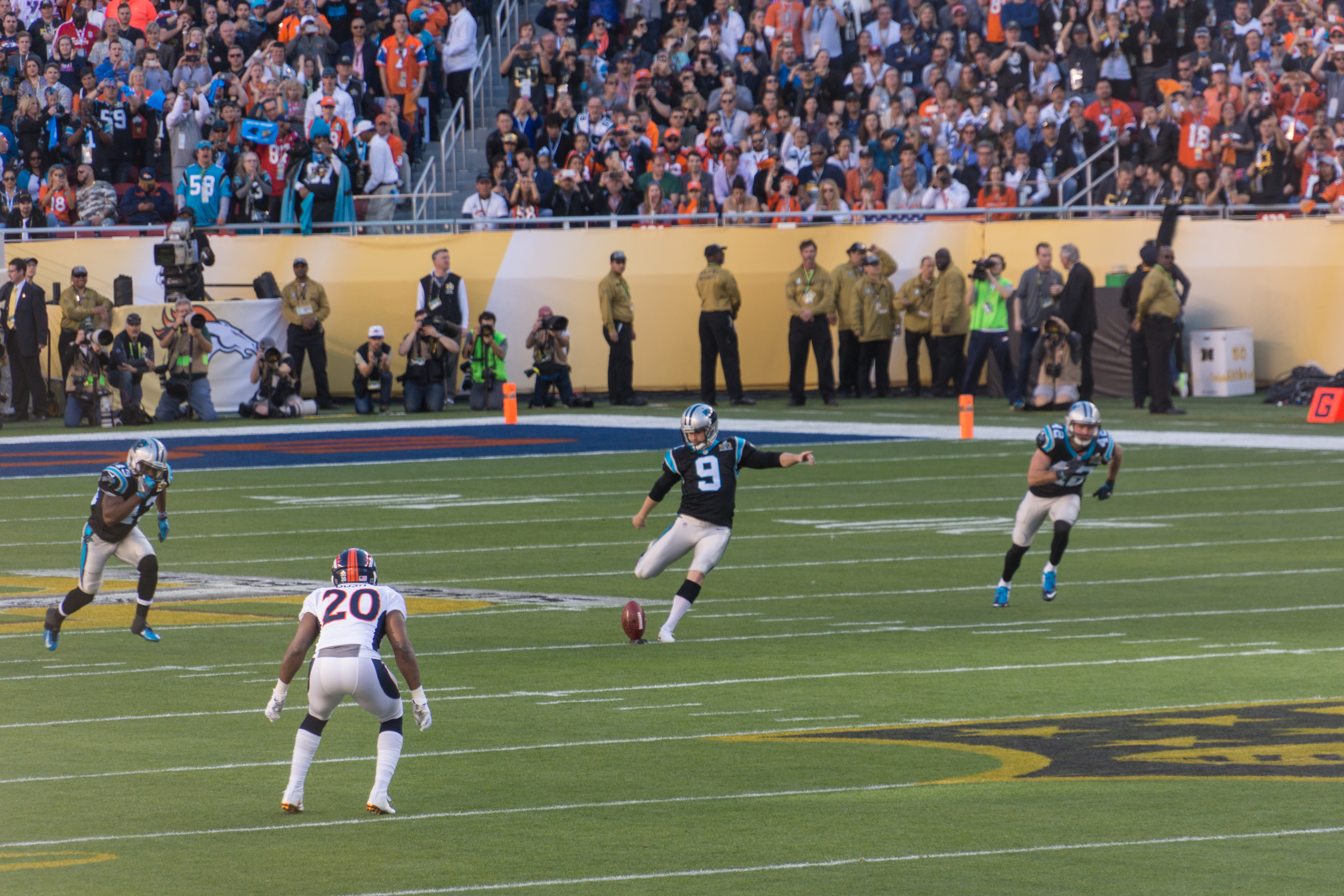
Gano kicking off in Super Bowl 50

On November 2, 2015, Gano kicked a game-winning 52-yard field goal in overtime against the Indianapolis Colts. The successful field goal helped move the Panthers to a franchise-best 7–0 start.

Gano had an NFL-leading 62 points in November 2015, going 15-for-17 on field goals and 17-for-18 on extra-point attempts. For his performance during November, Gano was awarded the NFC Special Teams Player of the Month He became only the second kicker in Panthers' franchise history to win the award (the first was John Kasay in September 1996). Through the first 12 weeks of the season, Gano ranked second in NFL in points scored with 110, trailing only New England Patriots kicker, Stephen Gostkowski (111). During the Panthers 38–35 victory over the New York Giants, Gano kicked his second walk-off winner this season as time expired to move the Panthers to a 14–0 record. Gano finished the 2015 NFL season with 146 points, breaking John Kasay‘s team record for most in a season (145, 1996). During the season, he also topped the NFL with 69 touchbacks and a 72.0 yard average kickoff distance.

In Super Bowl 50, Gano was one-of-two on field goals and converted the lone extra point for the Panthers. In the third quarter with the Panthers trailing by a score of 13–7, Gano missed a field goal that hit off the right side of the goal post. The Panthers went on to fall to the Denver Broncos by a score of 24–10.

==== 2016 season ====
In the 2016 season, Gano converted 31 of 34 extra point attempts and 30 of 38 field goal attempts.

==== 2017 season ====
On September 17, 2017, in Week 2, Gano scored all of the Panthers' points in a 9–3 victory over the Buffalo Bills. The three field goals he converted were a 34-yarder, 28-yarder, and a 20-yarder.

In the 2017–18 Playoffs, Gano missed a 25-yard field goal attempt early in a Wild Card Round against the Saints, but would go on to make four field goals, including a 58-yard field goal, tying Pete Stoyanovich for the longest field goal made in the postseason in NFL history. In the 2017 season, Gano finished with 34 of 37 extra points made and 29 of 30 field goals made.

Gano was named to his first Pro Bowl in 2017 as an injury replacement for Greg Zuerlein.

==== 2018 season ====
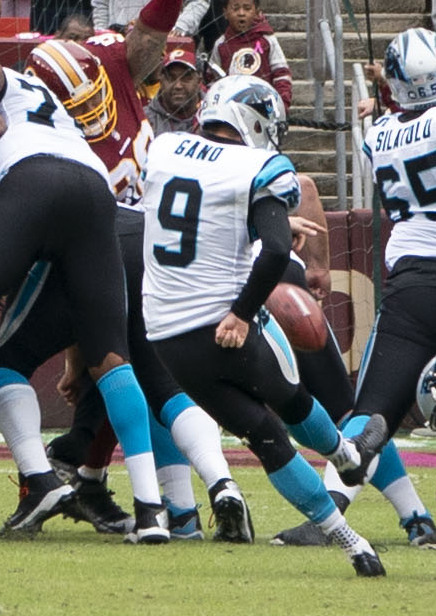
Gano kicking a field goal against the Washington Redskins, 2018

On March 6, 2018, Gano signed a four-year, $17 million contract extension with the Panthers. On October 7, 2018, Gano kicked a 63-yard field goal game-winning field goal as time expired in a 33–31 victory over the Giants, earning him NFC Special Teams Player of the Week. The kick also tied the non-altitude assisted field goal record set in 1970 by Tom Dempsey and tied in 2012 by David Akers. He earned NFC Special Teams Player of the Month for October. He was placed on injured reserve on December 19, 2018, after sitting out the previous two games due to injury. He finished the season having converted 30 of 33 extra point attempts and 14 of 16 field goal attempts.

==== 2019 season ====
On August 30, 2019, Gano was placed on injured reserve, ending his 2019 season. He was released by the team on July 30, 2020, as they chose to keep Joey Slye.

=== New York Giants ===
==== 2020 season ====
Gano signed with the Giants on August 19, 2020.

Gano set a Giants franchise record in Week 5 when he successfully kicked three field goals of 50 or more yards at Dallas (50, 54 and 55 yards). In Week 9 against his former team, the Washington Commanders (then known as the Washington Redskins), Gano was a perfect two for two on extra point attempts and a perfect three for three on field goal attempts during the 23–20 win. Gano was named the NFC Special Teams Player of the Week for his performance in Week 9.

On November 15, 2020, Gano signed a three-year, $14 million contract extension through 2023. On November 17, 2020, Gano was placed on the reserve/COVID-19 list after testing positive for COVID-19. He was activated on November 28, 2020. He finished the 2020 season with 21 of 23 extra point attempts converted and 31 of 32 field goal attempts converted.

==== 2021 season ====
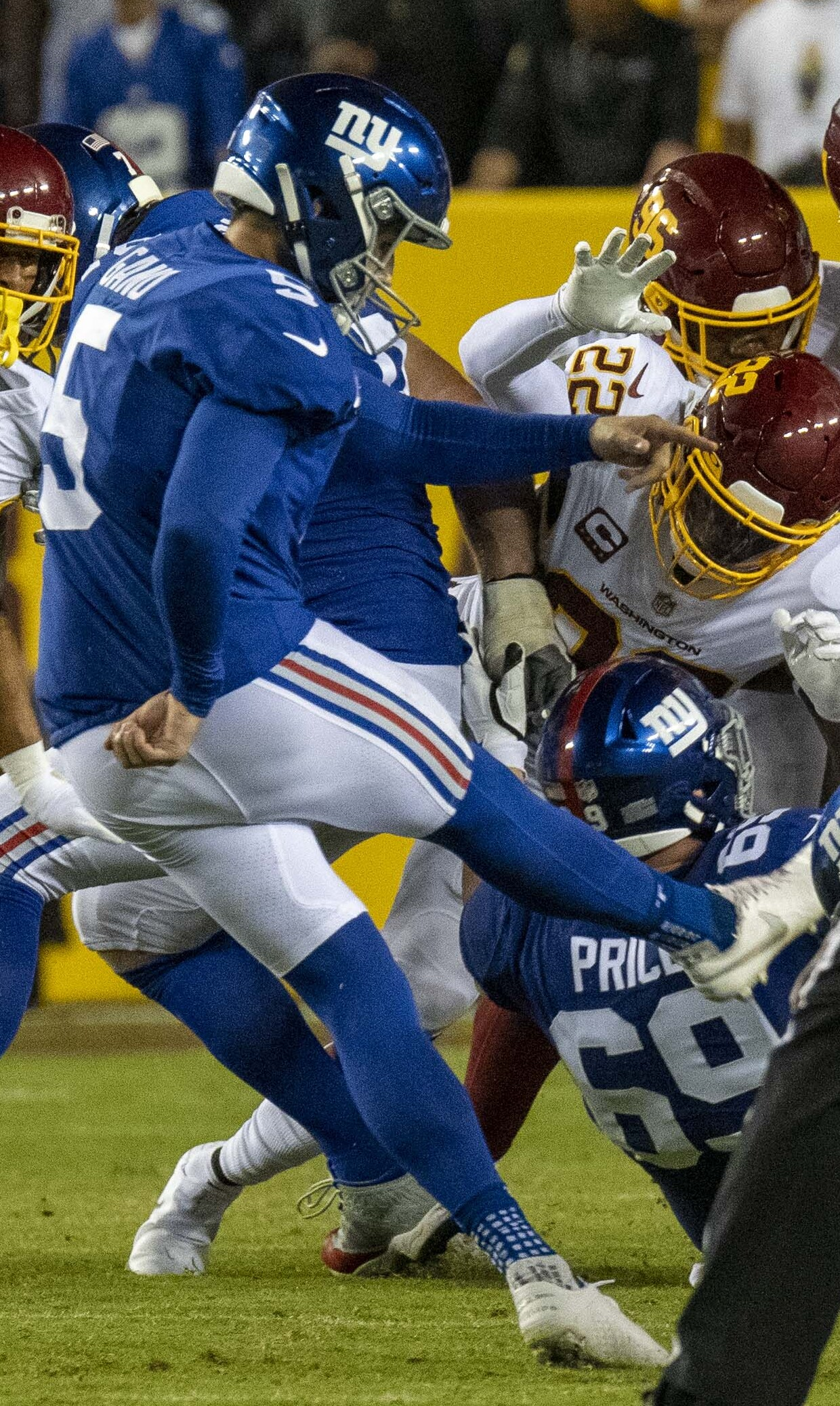
Gano kicking a field goal against the Washington Football Team, 2021

On October 3, 2021, Gano missed a 35 yard field goal against the New Orleans Saints ending his streak of most consecutive field goals made of just 37 which tied with Jason Myers in fourth place in the NFL record. Gano was named the NFC Special Teams Player of the Week for making all 3 field goals in Week 7 game against the Panthers. In the 2021 season, Gano converted all 17 extra point attempts and 29 of 33 field goal attempts.

==== 2022 season ====
On May 10, 2022, Kayvon Thibodeaux donated $50,000 to a charity to get the #5 jersey from Gano, who switched from #5 to #9. In Week 2 game against the Panthers, Gano made four field goals in the 19–16 win and was named NFC Special Teams Player of the Week. He converted 32 of 34 extra point attempts and 29 of 32 field goal attempts in 17 games in the 2022 season.

==== 2023 season ====
On September 8, 2023, Gano signed a three-year contract extension with the Giants. He was placed on injured reserve on November 4, 2023.

==== 2024 season ====
In the 2024 season, Gano appeared in ten games. He finished converting all 15 extra point attempts and nine of 11 field goal attempts.

==== 2025 season ====
In the Giants' Week 3 game against the Kansas City Chiefs, Gano suffered a groin injury in warmups, hindering his availability during the 22–9 loss. He was placed on injured reserve as a result of the injury on September 27. On October 25, Gano was activated ahead of the team's Week 8 matchup against the Philadelphia Eagles. On November 12, he was placed back on injured reserve due to a neck injury.

On March 30, 2026, Gano was waived by the Giants with a failed physical designation.

== Personal life ==
Gano is a Christian. He is married to Brittany Gano. They have five children.

He is related to Stephen G. Gano, who was a member of the Rutgers team that played in the first-ever collegiate football game against Princeton University.

== Career statistics ==
=== UFL ===
Year	Team	Overall FGs				PATs			Points
Year	Team	FGA	FGM	Pct	Lng	XPA	XPM	Pct	Points
2009	Las Vegas Locomotives	16	13	81.6	53	20	20	100.0	59
Total		16	13	81.6	53	20	20	100.0	59

=== NFL ===
==== Regular season ====
Legend
	Led the league
**Bold**	Career high

Year	Team	GP	Overall FGs				PATs			Kickoffs			Points
Year	Team	GP	Lng	FGA	FGM	Pct	XPA	XPM	Pct	KO	Avg	TB	Points
2009	WAS	4	46	4	4	**100.0**	7	6	85.7	15	65.7	3	18
2010	WAS	16	49	35	24	68.6	28	28	**100.0**	71	65.0	9	100
2011	WAS	16	59	**41**	**31**	75.6	26	25	96.2	73	60.6	32	118
2012	CAR	6	51	11	9	81.8	21	20	95.2	35	**66.6**	20	47
2013	CAR	16	55	27	24	88.9	42	42	**100.0**	80	64.8	63	114
2014	CAR	16	53	35	29	82.9	34	34	**100.0**	79	65.8	61	121
2015	CAR	16	52	36	30	83.3	**59**	**56**	94.9	**102**	65.7	69	**146**
2016	CAR	16	54	38	30	78.9	34	31	91.2	86	63.9	63	121
2017	CAR	16	48	30	29	96.7	37	34	91.9	83	64.0	**70**	121
2018	CAR	12	**63**	16	14	87.5	33	30	90.9	62	63.5	47	72
2019	CAR	0	Did not play due to injury										
2020	NYG	16	55	32	**31**	96.9	23	21	91.3	73	59.7	30	114
2021	NYG	**17**	55	33	29	87.9	17	17	**100.0**	63	61.9	26	104
2022	NYG	**17**	57	32	29	90.6	34	32	94.1	84	60.9	50	119
2023	NYG	8	57	17	11	64.7	8	8	**100.0**	28	65.0	23	41
2024	NYG	10	53	11	9	81.8	15	15	**100.0**	35	64.0	24	42
2025	NYG	5	55	10	9	90.0	9	9	**100.0**	11	60.3	0	36
Career		207	63	408	342	83.8	427	408	95.6	980	63.6	590	1,434

==== Playoffs ====
Year	Team	GP	Overall FGs				PATs			Kickoffs			Points
Year	Team	GP	Lng	FGA	FGM	Pct	XPA	XPM	Pct	KO	Avg	TB	Points
2013	CAR	1	24	1	1	**100.0**	1	1	100.0	3	65.0	3	4
2014	CAR	2	47	4	3	75.0	5	5	100.0	10	60.8	5	14
2015	CAR	**3**	48	**5**	**4**	80.0	**10**	**10**	100.0	**18**	**65.4**	**11**	**22**
2017	CAR	1	**58**	**5**	**4**	80.0	2	2	100.0	6	65.0	6	14
2022	NYG	2	25	1	1	**100.0**	5	5	100.0	8	65.0	7	8
Total		9	58	16	13	81.3	23	23	100.0	45	64.2	32	62

=== Panthers franchise records ===
- Extra Points: season (56 in 2015), game (five on November 22, 2015, against the Washington Redskins), playoff season (10 in 2015), playoff game (five on January 24, 2016, against the Arizona Cardinals)
- Longest Field Goal: set the franchise record with a 63 yard game-winning field goal over the Giants on October 7, 2018.

=== Giants franchise records ===
- Most consecutive field goals made (30 in 2020) for the New York Giants. This is the franchise record. The streak lasted until Week 4 of the 2021 NFL season, ending at 37.
