= Jager Burton =

American football player (born 2002)

No. 52 – Green Bay Packers
- Position: Guard
- Roster status: Active

Personal information
- Born: August 24, 2002 (age 24); Lexington, Kentucky, U.S.
- Listed height: 6 ft 4 in (1.93 m)
- Listed weight: 312 lb (142 kg)

Career information
- High school: Frederick Douglass (Lexington)
- College: Kentucky (2021–2025)
- NFL draft: 2026: 5th round, 153rd overall pick

Career history
- Green Bay Packers (2026–present)

Career NFL statistics as of Week 9, 2026
- Games played: 3
- Games started: 1
- Stats at Pro Football Reference

Camden Jager Burton (born August 24, 2002) is an American professional football guard for the Green Bay Packers of the National Football League (NFL). He played college football for the Kentucky Wildcats and was selected by the Packers in the fifth round of the 2026 NFL draft.

== Early life ==
Burton attended Lexington Christian Academy during his freshman season, transferring the following year to Frederick Douglass High School in Lexington, Kentucky. As a senior, he was named the Kentucky Gatorade Football Player of the Year, the Paul Hornung Award winner as the state's top player, and the Co-Mr. Kentucky Football award winner. Coming out of high school, Burton was rated as a four-star recruit and the best prospect in Kentucky, and committed to play college football for the Kentucky Wildcats over offers from schools such as Ohio State, Clemson, Alabama and Oregon.

== College career ==
As a freshman in 2021, Burton took a redshirt. During the 2022 season, he started in all 13 games for the Wildcats at left guard. Heading into the 2023 season, Burton switched to play center. He finished the 2023 season with 12 starts. In 2024, Burton switched back to left guard, making ten starts.

== Professional career ==
Pre-draft measurables
Height	Weight	Arm length	Hand span	Wingspan	40-yard dash	10-yard split	20-yard split	20-yard shuttle	Three-cone drill	Vertical jump	Broad jump	Bench press
6 ft 4 1/8 in (1.93 m)	312 lb (142 kg)	32 1/2 in (0.83 m)	10 1/8 in (0.26 m)	6 ft 8 5/8 in (2.05 m)	4.94 s	1.76 s	2.90 s	4.52 s	7.64 s	30.5 in (0.77 m)	9 ft 7 in (2.92 m)	28 reps
All values from NFL Combine/Pro Day

Burton was selected by the Green Bay Packers in the fifth round with the 153rd overall pick of the 2026 NFL draft. The selection was received from the Philadelphia Eagles prior to the draft in exchange for Dontayvion Wicks. Burton was signed on May 1, 2026.
