= Ty Bryant =

American football player (born 2004)

No. 14 – Kentucky Wildcats
- Position: Defensive back
- Class: Senior

Personal information
- Born: August 18, 2004 (age 22); Lexington, Kentucky, U.S.
- Listed height: 6 ft 0 in (1.83 m)
- Listed weight: 196 lb (89 kg)

Career information
- High school: Frederick Douglass (Lexington)
- College: Kentucky (2023–present)

Awards and highlights
- Second-team All-SEC (2025)
- Stats at ESPN

Ty Bryant (born August 18, 2004) is an American football defensive back for the Kentucky Wildcats.

== Early life ==
Bryant was born in Lexington, Kentucky and attended Frederick Douglass High School. He was rated as a three-star recruit, where he committed to play college football for the Kentucky Wildcats.

== College career ==
In week 9 of the 2023 season, Bryant made his first career start, making 12 tackles in a loss against Tennessee. He finished his freshman season in 2023 with 40 tackles and a pass deflection. In 2024, Bryant recorded 46 tackles with two going for a loss, and an interception, in 12 games. In week 2 of the 2025 season, he notched 10 tackles and two interceptions in a loss versus Ole Miss. Bryant finished the 2025 season with 76 tackles with two being for a loss, a pass deflection, and four interceptions in 12 starts, earning second-team all-SEC honors.

== Personal life ==
Bryant is the son of former Kentucky wide receiver, Cisco Bryant.
