= Saida Grundy =

American professor, sociologist and journalist (born 1982)

- Born: February 1982 (age 44); Lexington, Kentucky
- Occupations: Professor, Sociologist, Opinion Columnist

Academic background
- Education: Spelman College 2004, University of Michigan 2014

Academic work
- Discipline: Sociology, Black Studies, Gender Studies
- Institutions: Boston University, The Guardian

Saida Grundy (born 1982), is an American academic, author, journalist and public intellectual. She serves as Associate Professor of Sociology at Boston University where she is also faculty in the program in African American & Black Diasporic Studies as well as Women's & Gender Studies. She is currently a columnist for The Guardian US where she has contributed since 2023.

She is the author of Respectable: Politics and Paradox in Making the Morehouse Man (2022), an ethnographic study based in her research on men, masculinities, and African-American elites. Her column and commentary focus on race, racial justice, and inequalities, most often with a sociological and historical context. From 2018 to 2021 she was a contributor to The Atlantic. Her research and essays have received several awards from the American Sociological Association and the National Association of Black Journalists.

== Early life and education ==
Grundy was born and raised in Lexington, Kentucky, and graduated from Paul Laurence Dunbar High School where she served as student body president. She graduated Cum laude from Spelman College in 2004 where she was the senior columnist for The Maroon Tiger, the official student newspaper of neighboring Morehouse College, and was also elected Miss Maroon & White (Miss Morehouse College). She received both her M.A. and Ph.D. in the joint program in Sociology and Women's Studies at the University of Michigan Rackham Graduate School.

== Personal life ==
Grundy is the granddaughter of Rev. Luke Beard, a prominent minister in the Birmingham, Alabama Civil Rights movement and pastor of the 16th Street Baptist Church, a national historic landmark, from 1945 until his untimely death in 1960.

== Selected publications ==
- Grundy, Saida (2022). Respectable: Politics and Paradox in Making the Morehouse Man.
- Grundy, Saida (2021). "Lifting the Veil on Campus Sexual Assault: Morehouse College, Hegemonic Masculinity, and Revealing Racialized Rape Culture through the Du Boisian Lens." Social Problems (Berkeley, Calif.), 68(2), 226–249.
- Grundy, Saida (2012). "An Air of Expectancy": Class, Crisis, and the Making of Manhood at a Historically Black College for Men. The Annals of the American Academy of Political and Social Science, 642(1), 43–60.
- Grundy, Saida (June 2026). "The white working class knows the American project isn't working. Here's why that will never matter to them"
- Grundy, Saida (February 2026). "America's contract to protect white women has always been tenuous"
- Grundy, Saida (February 2026). "Jesse Jackson shifted Black politics from the margins of the Democratic party to its center"
- Grundy, Saida (July 2025). "Trump is terrified of Black culture, but not for the reasons you think"
- Grundy, Saida (July 2020). "The False Promise of Anti-racism Books"
- Grundy, Saida (April 2020). "Why Boredom Affects Us So Much"
- Grundy, Saida (January 2019). "The Flawed Logic of R. Kelly's Most Unlikely Supporters"
