= Frederick Douglass High School (Lexington, Kentucky) =

Coordinates: 38.0396°N 84.4356°W

Location
- 2000 Winchester Road; Lexington, Kentucky 40509; United States

Information
- School type: Public
- Founded: 2017
- Principal: Lester Diaz
- Teaching staff: 90.50 (on an FTE basis)
- Grades: 9–12
- Enrollment: 1,719 (2023–2024)
- Student to teacher ratio: 17.99
- Language: English
- Area: Suburban
- Colors: Keeneland Green; Orange
- Team name: Broncos
- Website: douglass.fcps.net

Frederick Douglass High School is a public high school located on the eastern side of Lexington, Kentucky, United States. The school is one of six high schools in the Fayette County Public Schools district and was constructed to reduce overcrowding at Bryan Station High School and Henry Clay High School.

Frederick Douglass High School is named after the 19th century African-American abolitionist Frederick Douglass. Opened in August 2017, the school is the newest high school in the Fayette County Public Schools system.

== Football ==
Frederick Douglass rose quickly to national prominence, ranking as high as 48th nationally in the MaxPreps. In 2022, Frederick Douglass won its first State Title vs Bowling Green High School in the 5A KHSAA State Championship. This came after two appearances that resulted in state runner up trophies (2019, 2021).

Season Results
Year	Record	Final Game
2017	10-3	Loss in Round 3 KHSAA 6A Playoffs, TTUN
2018	11-1	Loss in Round 2 KHAAA 6A Playoffs, TTUN
2019	14-1	Loss in KHSAA 5A State Championship, Covington Catholic
2020	7-2	Loss in Round 4 KHSAA 5A Playoffs, Owensboro
2021	13-2	Loss in KHSAA 5A State Championship, South Warren
2022	15-0	Win in KHSAA 5A State Championship, Bowling Green

== Controversy ==
About 9 months before the school opened, it was announced that the mascot of Frederick Douglass High School would be the "Stallions." Some viewed this as "inappropriate and sexist." (Quote from founder of the petition to change the stallions mascot). The controversy quickly gained traction and was soon featured in national newspapers. The stallions name was quickly removed, but it was decided that a horse would be the mascot because the property Frederick Douglass is built on was previously a horse farm. With the school year rapidly approaching, Principal Lester Diaz was running out of options. The decision was made to ask the students on the first day of school to vote on a new name. The final decision, with 59% of the vote, was the Frederick Douglass "Broncos." "Mustangs," "Racers," "Thoroughbreds" and, "Stampede" were also listed as options for students to vote on (Stallions was not an option).

== Safety ==
On March 9, 2018, a student accidentally shot himself, causing 30-40% of students to leave. It installed metal detectors, becoming the first Fayette County school to do so. The school also installed a 192-camera system, access control with intercom and ID badging, and intrusion detection.

On November 7, 2018, a student took a loaded handgun into the school after being checked with a hand-held metal detector. The student did not fire the gun and has said that he had no intent to fire it. It was later found that the handgun was stolen, and the student was charged with possession of a weapon on school property and possession of a stolen handgun.

== Notable alumni ==
- Walker Parks (2020), college football offensive guard
- Jager Burton (2021), NFL center
- Dane Key (2022), NFL wide receiver
- Ty Bryant (2023), college football defensive back
