= John Douglas (conductor) =

American conductor, voice teacher, vocal coach, and accompanist

John Douglas

John Douglas (3 June 1956 – 12 July 2010) was an American conductor, voice teacher, vocal coach, and accompanist.

== Life and career ==
Born in Morgantown, West Virginia, Douglas graduated from Tates Creek High School in Lexington, Kentucky in 1973. In 1977 he graduated from Wittenberg University with a Bachelor of Music degree, and in 1979 he earned a Master of Music in piano performance from Bowling Green State University. In 1979 he joined the faculty of the New England Conservatory where he served as the head of the music staff through 1989. He concurrently served on the voice faculty of the Boston Conservatory as an instructor of European diction from 1980 to 1989. He was also an instructor of German diction and repertoire coach at the American Institute of Musical Studies in Graz, Austria in 1985 and 1986.

In 1989 Douglas joined the faculty of the Boyer College of Music and Dance at Temple University as an associate professor in the department of voice and opera; remaining there until his death 21 years later. He became the music director and conductor of the school's Opera Theatre program, notably conducting more than 50 student opera productions. He was the recipient of the Temple University Faculty Award for Creative Achievement in 2006.

During the 1980s Douglas worked on the staffs of several opera companies, including the Merrimack Lyric Opera Company, the Boston Concert Opera, and the Goldovsky Opera Institute. In 1983 and 1989 he served as the assistant conductor of the Central City Opera. From 1990 to 1993, he served as music director and principal conductor of the Ash Lawn Summer Festival. He worked as a vocal coach and conductor at the Chautauqua Opera from 1994 to 2002. From 2003 to 2010, he served as a board member of the National Opera Association.

In 2003 Douglas became director of the apprentice program, chorus master, and head of music staff at the Lake George Opera (LGO), a post he held until his death of melanoma in 2010. He conducted several operas for the LGO, including performances of La Vie parisienne (2007) and The Barber of Seville (2006). He also performed frequently as an accompanist in recitals and concerts; including making recital appearances with Denyce Graves, David Holloway, Lorraine Hunt Lieberson, William Lewis, Haijing Fu, Marquita Lister, and Victoria Livengood among other well known singers.
