= Cheerleader Nation =

2006 American reality TV series series

- Genre: Reality
- Starring: Saleem Habash; Donna Martin
- Country of origin: United States
- Original language: English
- No. of seasons: 1
- No. of episodes: 8

Production
- Executive producer: Laurie Girion
- Producer: Karri-Leigh Mastrangelo
- Production location: Lexington, Kentucky
- Running time: 60 minutes
- Production companies: Fox Television Studios; Swim Entertainment

Original release
- Network: Lifetime
- Release: March 12 – May 28, 2006

Cheerleader Nation is an American reality television series series that was broadcast on Lifetime. It based on the Lexington, Kentucky-based Paul Laurence Dunbar High School cheerleading team's ups and downs on the way to Nationals to win a third time. The show also explains how cheerleading is an intense physical activity.

== Description ==
Cheerleader Nation focuses on several varsity cheerleaders, including Ryan, Amanda, Megan, Katie, Ayrica, Kaitlin, Chelsea, Nicole and Ashley. The relationship with their mothers is also integral to the show.

The team's coach is Donna Martin, mother of team member Ryan. Another central character is Saleem who helps with the team's choreography along with Martin.

== Cheerleaders ==
Ryan
The coach's daughter A sophomore who is also the coach's daughter. (She is now cheerleading coach at the University of Kentucky).
Amanda
The freshman The only freshman on the varsity squad. Her birthday is June 18. She has a very close relationship with her mother, who is very involved in Amanda's life in high school, especially cheerleading. (She now cheers at the University of Tennessee, Knoxville).
Megan
The big sister A senior who is nervous about graduating because she does not want to leave the familiarity of high school. Her birthday is April 13. Megan's season revolves around her ability to land a full layout in competition. She finally does so in Nationals.
Alexa
The little sister Megan's younger sister, is a sophomore who is also on the squad. Her birthday is September 24.
Kaitlin
The Captain
Katie
The new girl A senior who has never cheered before.
Chelsea
The princess A junior who does not get along with her mother very well and is best friends with fellow cheerleader, Nicole, although their relationship has started to suffer as a result of Nicole's serious boyfriend. Chelsea falls in the Regionals routine.
Ayrica
A junior who is one of the most consistent on the squad. She maintains a 4.2 GPA
Ashley
The perfectionist A junior who is very self-conscious but has a very supportive boyfriend, Brennan.

The show follows the girls from tryouts to Regionals and then to Nationals, where they win their third national championship title.

== Episode guide season 1 ==
1. Tryouts Fears and Tears
2. Save the Drama for Your Mama
3. Pressure Makes Perfect
4. Regionals Roulette
5. Generations Gap
6. Nightline Before Nationals
7. Team without a Dream (1)
8. Team with a Dream (2)

== See also ==
- Official Site
- Cheerleading
