= Frank Minnifield =

American football player (born 1960)

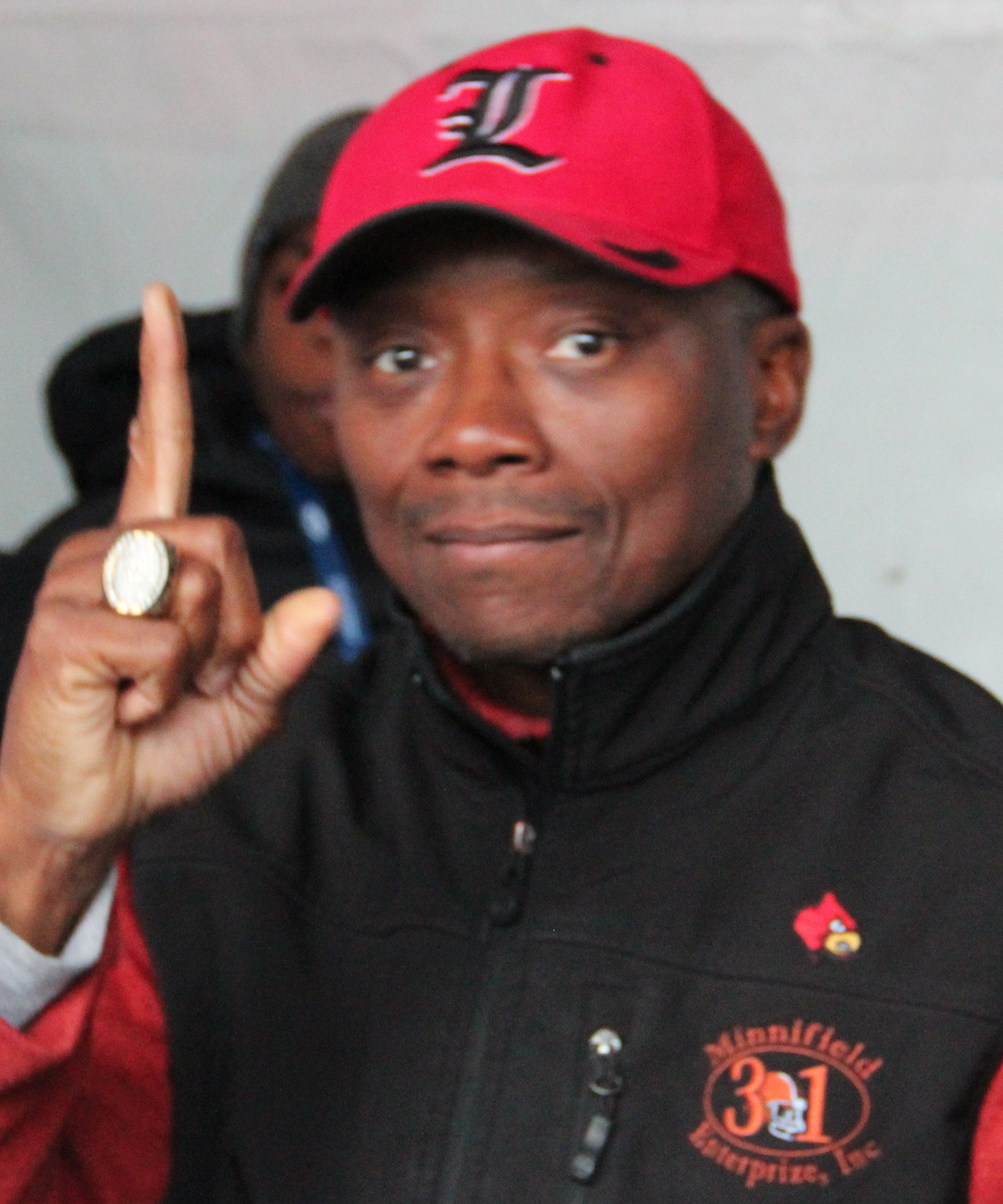
- Minnifield in 2014

No. 1, 31
- Position: Cornerback

Personal information
- Born: January 1, 1960 (age 66); Lexington, Kentucky, U.S.
- Listed height: 5 ft 9 in (1.75 m)
- Listed weight: 180 lb (82 kg)

Career information
- High school: Clay (Lexington)
- College: Louisville
- NFL draft: 1983: undrafted

Career history
- Chicago Blitz (1983); Arizona Wranglers (1984); Cleveland Browns (1984–1992)

Awards and highlights
- First-team All-Pro (1988); 4× Pro Bowl (1986–1989); NFL 1980s All-Decade Team; PFWA All-Rookie Team (1984); Second-team All-South Independent (1982); Cleveland Browns Legends; Louisville Cardinals Ring of Honor; Inducted into KY Pro Football HOF (2004)

Career NFL statistics
- Interceptions: 20
- Interception yards: 124
- Fumble recoveries: 7
- Stats at Pro Football Reference

Frank LyDale Minnifield (born January 1, 1960) is an American former professional football cornerback for the Cleveland Browns in the National Football League (NFL) from 1984 to 1992. He played college football for the Louisville Cardinals.

== Early life ==
Minnifield attended Henry Clay High School in Lexington, Kentucky.

== College career ==
Considered too small for college football at just 5'9" and 140 pounds, he walked on to the football team at the University of Louisville, earning a scholarship spot for his final three years. As a junior in 1981, he led the nation in average yards per kickoff return (30.4) and led his team in punt returns.

== Professional career ==
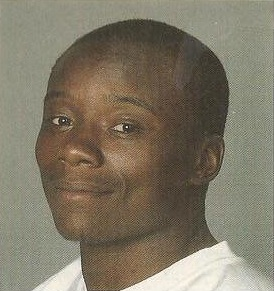
Minnifield in 1985

After graduation in 1982, Minnifield joined the Chicago Blitz (later the Arizona Wranglers) of the USFL. He successfully sued the Wranglers for the right to move to the NFL, and signed as a free agent with the Browns in 1984. Minnifield became a fixture at cornerback for Cleveland and was named to the Pro Bowl four straight years from 1986 to 1989. Known for his aggressive bump and run man coverage and hard hitting style, he was named to the NFL 1980s All-Decade Team as selected by voters of the Pro Football Hall of Fame. He and fellow cornerback Hanford Dixon named the Dawg Pound cheering section at Cleveland Stadium.

== Personal ==
Upon retirement, Minnifield founded Minnifield All-Pro Homes, a homebuilding company in Lexington. In 1993, he became the first African American executive named to the Lexington Chamber of Commerce Board, and as of 2000, he was the only African American home builder in Lexington.

Minnifield's son, Chase, played in the NFL as a cornerback for the Washington Redskins.

== See also ==
- List of NCAA major college yearly punt and kickoff return leaders
