= David Akers =

American football player (born 1974)

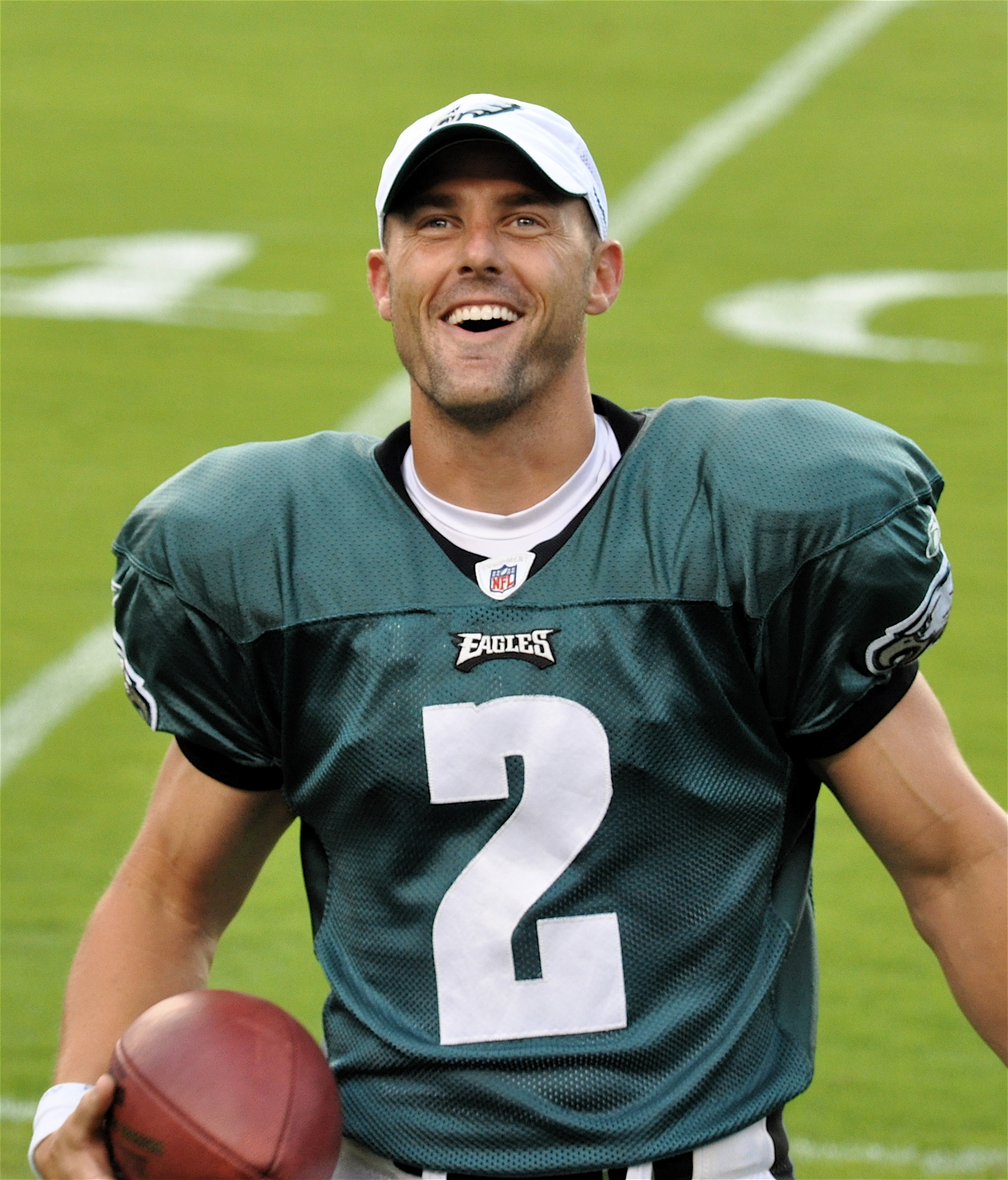
- Akers with the Philadelphia Eagles in 2009

No. 6, 2
- Position: Kicker

Personal information
- Born: December 9, 1974 (age 51); Lexington, Kentucky, U.S.
- Listed height: 5 ft 10 in (1.78 m)
- Listed weight: 200 lb (91 kg)

Career information
- High school: Tates Creek (Lexington)
- College: Louisville (1993–1996)
- NFL draft: 1997: undrafted

Career history
- Carolina Panthers (1997)*; Atlanta Falcons (1997–1998)*; Washington Redskins (1998); Berlin Thunder (1999); Philadelphia Eagles (1999–2010); San Francisco 49ers (2011–2012); Detroit Lions (2013)
- * Offseason or practice squad member only

Awards and highlights
- 2× First-team All-Pro (2001, 2011); 4× Second-team All-Pro (2002, 2004, 2009, 2010); 6× Pro Bowl (2001, 2002, 2004, 2009–2011); 2× NFL scoring leader (2010, 2011); NFL 2000s All-Decade Team; Golden Toe Award (2011); Philadelphia Eagles 75th Anniversary Team; Philadelphia Eagles Hall of Fame; NFL records: Most field goals made in a season (tied): 44 (2011)

Career NFL statistics
- Field goals made: 386
- Field goals attempted: 477
- Field goal percentage: 80.9%
- Longest field goal: 63
- Extra points made: 563
- Extra points attempted: 570
- Extra point percentage: 98.8%
- Points scored: 1,721
- Stats at Pro Football Reference

David Roy Akers (/ˈeɪkərz/ AY-kərz; born December 9, 1974) is an American former professional football player who was a kicker who played in the National Football League (NFL) for 16 seasons, primarily with the Philadelphia Eagles. He began his career in 1998 with the Washington Redskins. The following year, Akers signed with the Eagles, where he spent 12 seasons. Akers also played for the San Francisco 49ers and Detroit Lions before retiring in 2013.

During his career, Akers received six Pro Bowl and two first-team All-Pro selections. He also tied the then-NFL record for the longest successful field goal when he converted a 63-yard field goal, which at the time was tied for longest in league history. His 44 field goals in 2011 is tied for the single-season record. Akers is an inductee of the Philadelphia Eagles Hall of Fame and a member of the Philadelphia Eagles 75th Anniversary Team, along with being named to the second-team of the NFL 2000s All-Decade Team.

== Early life ==
Akers attended Tates Creek High School in Lexington, Kentucky.

== College career ==
Akers attended college at the University of Louisville and played for the Louisville Cardinals football team. During his four-year college career, Akers kicked a school-record 36 field goals (with a long of 51 yards against Texas A&M University), and ranks second on Louisville's all-time scoring list, with 219 points.

== Professional career ==
=== Carolina Panthers ===
Akers signed with the Carolina Panthers as an undrafted free agent on April 21, 1997. He was waived on August 17.

=== Atlanta Falcons ===
Akers signed to the Atlanta Falcons' practice squad on August 26, 1997. He remained on the practice squad for the entire 1997 NFL season. He re-signed with the Falcons on April 28, 1998. He was waived on July 7, 1998, and re-signed shortly thereafter. He was waived again on August 24.

=== Washington Redskins ===
Akers was signed by the Washington Redskins to their practice squad on September 1, 1998, and he was promoted to the active roster on September 15, 1998. He played in one game for them, making two extra points but missing two field goal attempts of 48+ yards each. He was waived on September 22, 1998, following the game.

After his release, Akers had tryouts with the Oakland Raiders, Jacksonville Jaguars, and on December 23, 1998, the Philadelphia Eagles.

=== Philadelphia Eagles ===
The Philadelphia Eagles signed Akers on January 11, 1999, and allocated him to NFL Europe with the Berlin Thunder.

In 2000, he made 29 out of 33 field goals (an 87.9% success rate), and had a team-record 121 points. Akers earned the NFC Special Teams Player of the Month award in November 2000. In 2001, Akers made the Pro Bowl for the first time, as he went 26-for-31, making a team-record 17 consecutive field goals during the season. He was also selected as an All-Pro, in a season that saw Philadelphia advance to the first of four consecutive NFC Championship games.

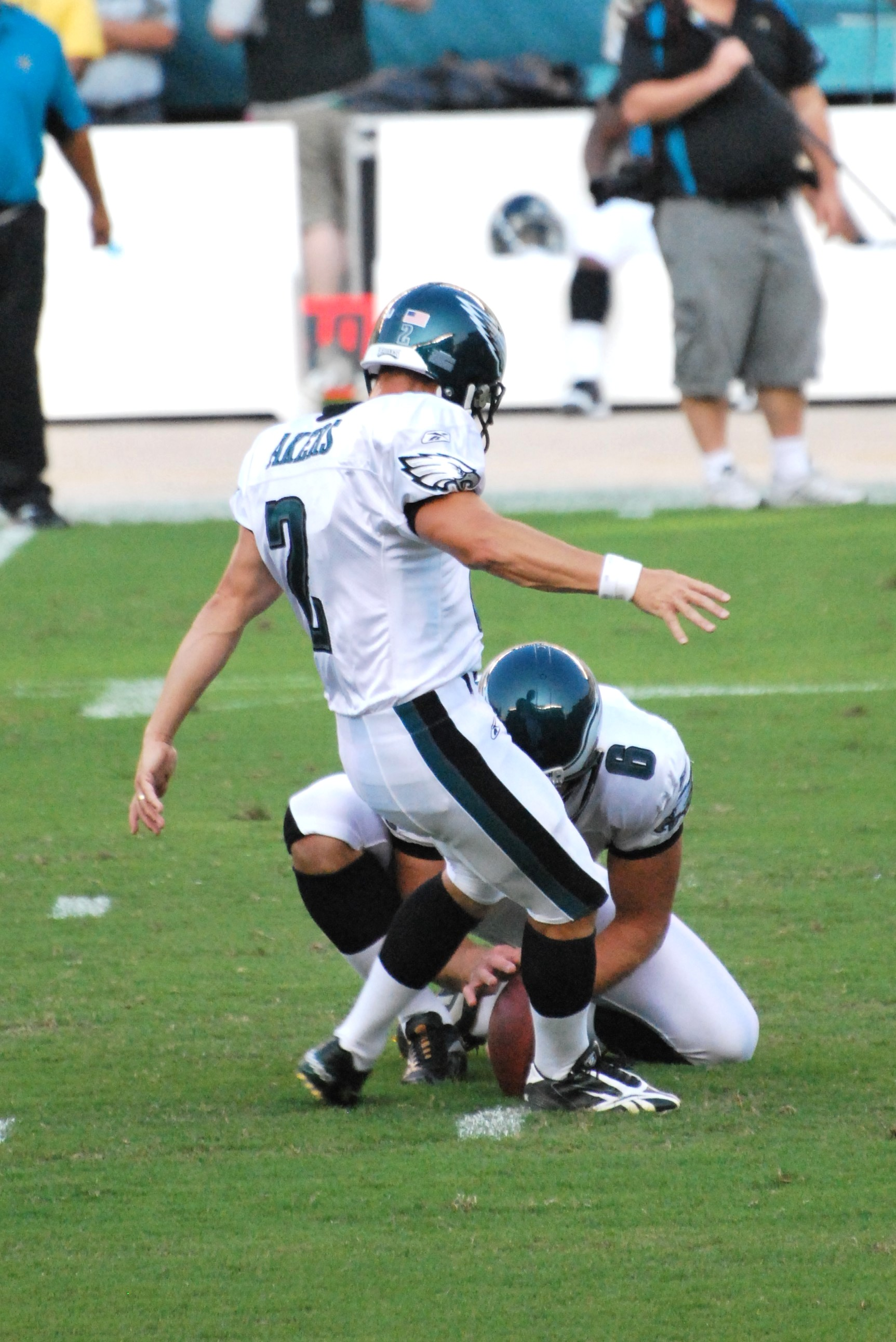
Akers attempting a field goal in August 2009

Akers' best statistical season was 2002 when he connected on 30 of 34 field goals (88.2%), scored a team-record 133 points, and made another Pro Bowl. He got fewer chances in 2003, but still made 24 of 29 field goals. He made the third-longest field goal in Eagles' history on September 14, 2003, a 57-yarder against the New England Patriots at the new Lincoln Financial Field. (The only longer field goals in Eagles' history have been Jake Elliott's 61-yard field goal in 2017 and Tony Franklin's 59-yard field goal in 1979).

In 2004, Akers continued his consistent kicking with an 84.4% field goal percentage, and he made his third Pro Bowl. He helped the Eagles to the Super Bowl that season, where they would be defeated by the New England Patriots.

Akers tore the hamstring in his non-kicking leg during the opening kickoff against the Oakland Raiders on September 25, 2005. Akers left the game, but returned in the second half with a heavily taped leg to make two extra points and then kick the game-winning 28-yard field goal before collapsing in pain as his teammates mobbed him. He missed the next four games and finished the season 16 for 22.

In 2006, Akers made 18 of 23 attempts (78.3%), his second-worst season statistically.

On December 16, 2007, in a 10–6 win over the Dallas Cowboys, Akers set the Eagles franchise record for most points and on Thanksgiving in 2008, Akers passed 1,000 career points during a 48–20 win over the Arizona Cardinals.

On December 7, 2008, Akers kicked a 51-yard field goal at Giants Stadium, his longest of the season. In the same game he had two field goals blocked, one of which was returned for a touchdown. At the end of the 2008 regular season, Akers again set the team single-season scoring record with an NFC-best 144 points. He connected on 33 of 40 field goals (82.5 pct), his best percentage since 2004.

On January 11, 2009, Akers kicked three field goals in three attempts during a divisional playoff victory over the New York Giants. The second of these set an NFL record for consecutive field goals without a miss during the postseason, previously held by one-time Eagle Gary Anderson. Akers eventually ran his streak to a record 19 consecutive postseason field goal conversions; it was snapped the very next week against the Arizona Cardinals. Akers had a total of thirty-five postseason field goal conversions during his career.

Akers was selected to the 2010 Pro Bowl, his fourth. He was also named to the NFL All-Decade Team for the 2000s. After the 2010 season, Akers was selected to his fifth career Pro Bowl, and named Eagles Special Teams MVP.

=== San Francisco 49ers ===
Akers was signed by the San Francisco 49ers to a $9 million, three-year contract on July 29, 2011. He kicked a 59-yard field goal just before halftime in a preseason game against the New Orleans Saints on August 12. On September 18, Akers kicked a 55-yard field goal against the Dallas Cowboys, setting a record for the longest field goal made at Candlestick Park.

Akers broke the 49ers' record for most points scored in a season in a 20–3 victory over the Pittsburgh Steelers in a Monday Night Football matchup on December 19, 2011. The record was formerly held by the 49ers' Hall of Fame wide receiver, Jerry Rice. In the next game against the Seahawks, Akers broke the all-time record for field goals in a season, surpassing Neil Rackers' 40 in 2005. The following week, Akers broke the NFL record for most points by a kicker in a single season against the St. Louis Rams; he finished with 166 points (surpassed by Jason Myers in 2025). In this game, he also extended his NFL record for most field goals made in a single season, finishing with 44, and threw for a touchdown on a fake field goal. Akers made his sixth Pro Bowl at the end of the season.

On September 9, 2012, Akers tied the NFL record for the longest field goal by kicking a 63-yard field goal off the crossbar against the Green Bay Packers at Lambeau Field, tying the overall, and now non-altitude-assisted record. It was the first non-altitude-assisted kick of that length since 1970. The non-assisted record was originally set by Tom Dempsey in 1970 and Graham Gano tied it in 2018. The overall record was shared with Jason Elam and Sebastian Janikowski (and later beaten by Justin Tucker of the Ravens in 2021 at Detroit, which was assisted as an indoor venue) until Broncos kicker Matt Prater broke the record with a 64-yard field goal on December 8, 2013, but those took place in Denver, Colorado, where altitude assistance on field goal kicks, similar to sprint running and throwing events, is known. Likewise, Tucker's 66-yard (and Brandon Aubrey's 65-yard field goal in 2024) field goals took place in retractable roof stadiums with the roof closed, which is similar to situations in athletics where for years the pole vault record was set indoors, where weather conditions (wind, et al.) do not affect the wind blowing the ball during attempts.

The long field goals by Elam, Janikowski, and Prater were all made in Denver, where the ball has the ability to travel slightly farther in thinner air. Elam kicked his 63-yard field goal at Mile High Stadium, while the 63-yarder by Janikowski and the 64-yarder by Prater were at Sports Authority Field at Mile High. In track and field, the IAAF denotes any records set 1,000 metres (about 3,937 feet) or more above sea level as altitude-assisted records, and the Dempsey (Tulane Stadium) and Akers (Lambeau Field) records were set below the 1,000m threshold.

The 49ers advanced to Super Bowl XLVII following the 2012 season, marking Akers' second appearance in the game. In the game, Akers went 3 for 3 in field goal attempts, but San Francisco narrowly lost to the Baltimore Ravens by a 34–31 score.

On March 6, 2013, Akers was released after two seasons with the 49ers.

=== Detroit Lions ===
On April 6, 2013, Akers signed with the Detroit Lions, three days after the retirement of 21-season Lions kicker Jason Hanson.

=== Retirement ===
On October 23, 2017, during a Monday Night Football matchup against the Washington Redskins, Akers was inducted into the Philadelphia Eagles Hall of Fame for his services during his 12 seasons with the team. Prior to the game, Akers signed a ceremonial contract with the team to retire as a member of the Eagles.

== NFL career statistics ==
Legend
	NFL record
	Led the league
**Bold**	Career high

=== Regular season ===
Year	Team	GP	Field goals									Extra points			Points
Year	Team	GP	FGM	FGA	FG%	<20	20−29	30−39	40−49	50+	Lng	XPM	XPA	XP%	Points
1998	WAS	1	0	2	0.0	0−0	0−0	0−0	0−2	0−0	0	2	2	**100.0**	2
1999	PHI	**16**	3	6	50.0	0−0	0−0	0−0	2−3	1−3	53	2	2	**100.0**	11
2000	PHI	**16**	29	33	87.9	1−1	6−6	14−15	7−10	1−1	51	34	36	94.4	121
2001	PHI	**16**	26	31	83.9	1−1	9−9	7−8	7−10	2−3	50	37	38	97.4	115
2002	PHI	**16**	30	34	**88.2**	0−0	9−9	**14−16**	6−7	1−2	51	43	43	**100.0**	133
2003	PHI	**16**	24	29	82.8	0−0	9−9	7−7	6−10	2−3	57	42	42	**100.0**	114
2004	PHI	**16**	27	32	84.4	0−0	4−4	6−7	**15−18**	2−3	51	41	42	97.6	122
2005	PHI	12	16	22	72.7	0−0	3−3	7−8	5−9	1−2	50	23	23	**100.0**	71
2006	PHI	**16**	18	23	78.3	0−0	9−10	3−5	6−8	0−0	47	**48**	**48**	**100.0**	102
2007	PHI	**16**	24	32	75.0	0−0	12−12	10−10	1−6	1−4	53	36	36	**100.0**	108
2008	PHI	**16**	33	40	82.5	**2−2**	11−11	10−12	8−10	2−5	51	45	45	**100.0**	144
2009	PHI	**16**	32	37	86.5	1−1	11−11	8−9	11−13	1−3	52	43	45	95.6	139
2010	PHI	**16**	32	38	84.2	0−0	12−12	9−11	10−12	1−3	50	47	47	**100.0**	143
2011	SF	**16**	**44**	**52**	84.6	**2−2**	**16−16**	13−14	6−11	**7−9**	55	34	34	**100.0**	**166**
2012	SF	**16**	29	42	69.0	1−1	8−9	11−13	7−13	2−6	**63**	44	44	**100.0**	131
2013	DET	**16**	19	24	79.2	1−1	5−5	6−8	4−7	3−3	53	42	43	97.7	99
Career		237	386	477	80.9	9−9	124−126	125−143	101−149	27−50	63	563	570	98.8	1,721

=== Postseason ===
Year	Team	GP	Field goals									Extra points			Points
Year	Team	GP	FGM	FGA	FG%	<20	20−29	30−39	40−49	50+	Lng	XPM	XPA	XP%	Points
2000	PHI	2	1	3	33.3	0−0	1−1	0−2	0-0	0−0	28	4	4	**100.0**	7
2001	PHI	**3**	6	6	**100.0**	0−0	**2−2**	1−1	**3−3**	0−0	46	10	10	**100.0**	28
2002	PHI	2	3	4	75.0	0−0	0−0	**3−3**	0−0	0−1	39	3	3	**100.0**	12
2003	PHI	2	3	4	75.0	0−0	0−0	2−3	1−1	0−0	41	2	2	**100.0**	11
2004	PHI	**3**	4	4	**100.0**	0−0	**2−2**	2−2	0−0	0−0	34	9	9	**100.0**	21
2006	PHI	2	4	4	78.3	**1−1**	1−1	1−1	1−1	0−0	48	5	5	**100.0**	17
2008	PHI	**3**	**9**	**10**	90.0	0−0	**2−2**	**3−3**	3−4	**1−1**	**51**	5	6	83.3	**32**
2009	PHI	1	0	0	0.0	0−0	0−0	0−0	0−0	0−0	−	2	2	**100.0**	2
2010	PHI	1	1	3	33.3	0−0	1−1	0−1	0−1	0−0	29	1	1	**100.0**	4
2011	SF	2	4	4	**100.0**	0−0	**2−2**	1−1	1−1	0−0	41	5	5	**100.0**	17
2012	SF	**3**	4	5	80.0	0−0	1−1	3−4	0−0	0−0	36	**12**	**12**	**100.0**	24
Career		24	39	47	83.0	1−1	13−13	15−20	9−11	1−2	51	58	59	98.8	175

== Career highlights ==
=== Awards and honors ===
- 2× First-team All-Pro (2001, 2011)
- 4× Second-team All-Pro (2002, 2004, 2009, 2010)
- 6× Pro Bowl (2001, 2002, 2004, 2009–2011)
- 2× NFL scoring leader (2010, 2011)
- NFL 2000s All-Decade Team
- Golden Toe Award (2011)
- Philadelphia Eagles 75th Anniversary Team
- Philadelphia Eagles Hall of Fame

=== NFL records ===
- Points in a single decade (2000–2009): 1,169
- Points in Pro Bowl history: 57
- Most points in a season, no touchdowns: 166 (2011, since broken)
- Most games 4+ field goals in a season: 6 (2011)
- Most games 10+ points in a season: 10 - tied with four others (2011)
- Field goals in an NFL season: 44 (tied with Ka'imi Fairbairn)
- Field goals attempted in an NFL season: 52
- Longest field goal in Pro Bowl history: 53 yards, 2005 (Eagles).

== Personal life ==
Akers and his wife, Erika, reside in Franklin, Tennessee, with their sons Luke and Sawyer and daughter Halley. He has maintained a summer residence in Ocean City, New Jersey. Luke is a punter for the Northwestern Wildcats.

Akers is a Christian.

In 2001, the Akers family formed the David Akers Kicks for Kids Foundation, which has established programs with the Children's Hospital of Philadelphia to benefit sick children and their families. He has also trained in martial arts jiu-jitsu and Shaolin Kempo.

On April 27, 2018, Akers was selected to announce an Eagles second-round draft pick during the 2018 NFL draft, which took place at the Cowboys' AT&T Stadium. Akers made a dramatic speech complete with trash talk directed at Cowboys fans, reminiscent to what Drew Pearson did the previous year in Philadelphia. Akers announced Dallas Goedert as the 49th overall pick.
