= Lexington Universal Academy =

Location
- 4580 Nicholasville Rd; Lexington, Kentucky 40515; United States
- 37.9644°N 84.5343°W

Information
- Type: Private
- Religious affiliation: Islamic
- Principal: Abdul-Munim S. Jitmoud
- Faculty: 16
- Grades: 1-8
- Gender: Coeducational
- Enrollment: 153
- Student to teacher ratio: 8:1

The Lexington Universal Academy (LUA) is a private Islamic school located in Lexington, Kentucky. LUA follows the state curriculum. but also incorporates religion classes and Arabic classes.

== History ==
LUA was founded by the Islamic Society of Central Kentucky in 2003. It first started out as just a school for Islam, but an indoor mosque was built along with a second floor. In 2012, science teacher Brian Radcliffe won Lexmark's INSPIRE Teaching Award.
