= List of longest NFL field goals =

The longest successful regular season field goal in National Football League (NFL) history is 68 yards by Cam Little of the Jacksonville Jaguars against the Las Vegas Raiders on November 2, 2025. The longest field goal attempt in an NFL game was 76 yards by Sebastian Janikowski of the Oakland Raiders against the San Diego Chargers on September 28, 2008. The longest successful field goal in NFL playoff history is 58 yards, first accomplished by Pete Stoyanovich on January 5, 1991, and then matched by Graham Gano on January 7, 2018. The Super Bowl record is 57 yards, set by Harrison Butker in Super Bowl LVIII.

== Longest field goals in regular season history ==
A 55-yard field goal, achieved by a drop kick, was recorded by Paddy Driscoll in 1924, and stood as the unofficial record for some time. Other sources record a 54-yarder by Glenn Presnell in 1934 as the record of the time due to difficulty verifying Driscoll's drop kick. The longest NFL field goal for nearly 20 years was 56 yards by Bert Rechichar of the Baltimore Colts in 1953. Tom Dempsey was the first over 60 yards when he hit a 63-yarder in 1970.

Distance	Kicker	Team	Result	Opponent	Date	Notes	Location	Elevation	Weather
68 yards	Cam Little	Jacksonville Jaguars	30–29 (OT)	Las Vegas Raiders	November 2, 2025	Right-footed; end of 1st half	Allegiant Stadium	2,184 ft (666 m)	Dome
67 yards	Cam Little	Jacksonville Jaguars	41–7	Tennessee Titans	January 4, 2026	Right-footed; end of 1st half; longest outdoor field goal	EverBank Stadium	4 ft (1.2 m)	58 °F (14 °C)
66 yards	Justin Tucker	Baltimore Ravens	19–17	Detroit Lions	September 26, 2021	Right-footed; game-winning field goal as time expired; ball bounced off crossbar before crossing the plane.	Ford Field	601 ft (183 m)	Dome
65 yards	Brandon Aubrey	Dallas Cowboys	25–28	Baltimore Ravens	September 22, 2024	Right-footed; longest field goal not at the end of a half and tied for the longest official field goal in a loss	AT&T Stadium	584 ft (179 m)	Retractable roof closed
65 yards	Chase McLaughlin	Tampa Bay Buccaneers	25–31	Philadelphia Eagles	September 28, 2025	Right-footed; end of 1st half; tied for the longest official field goal in a loss	Raymond James Stadium	35 ft (11 m)	93 °F (34 °C)
64 yards	Matt Prater	Denver Broncos	51–28	Tennessee Titans	December 8, 2013	End of 1st half	Sports Authority Field at Mile High	5,200 ft (1,585 m)	13 °F (−11 °C); Sunny; Wind: S at 3 mph; Humidity: 72%
64 yards	Brandon Aubrey	Dallas Cowboys	40–37 (OT)	New York Giants	September 14, 2025	Right-footed; game-tying field goal as time in regulation expired	AT&T Stadium	584 ft (179 m)	Retractable roof closed
64 yards	Tyler Loop	Baltimore Ravens	24–18	Tennessee Titans	October 4, 2026	Right-footed; kicked before halftime	M&T Bank Stadium	23 ft (7 m)	–
63 yards	Tom Dempsey	New Orleans Saints	19–17	Detroit Lions	November 8, 1970	Born with a stub for a right foot. Game-winning kick as time expired. Detroit kicker Errol Mann had kicked a field goal with 0:11 remaining to give Lions the lead. Previous record was 56 yards in 1953.	Tulane Stadium	16 ft (5 m)	65 degrees, relative humidity 79%, wind 10 mph
63 yards	Jason Elam	Denver Broncos	37–24	Jacksonville Jaguars	October 25, 1998	First field goal to tie record	Mile High Stadium	5,200 ft (1,585 m)	
63 yards	Sebastian Janikowski	Oakland Raiders	23–20	Denver Broncos	September 12, 2011	Left-footed	Sports Authority Field at Mile High	5,200 ft (1,585 m)	Light rain early
63 yards	David Akers	San Francisco 49ers	30–22	Green Bay Packers	September 9, 2012	Left-footed; end of first half; ball bounced off crossbar before crossing the plane	Lambeau Field	640 ft (200 m)	70 °F (21 °C); Mostly Cloudy; Wind: N at 7 mph; Humidity: 43%
63 yards	Graham Gano	Carolina Panthers	33–31	New York Giants	October 7, 2018	Game-winning field goal as time expired.	Bank of America Stadium	751 ft (229 m)	88 °F (31 °C); Mostly Sunny; Wind: E at 6 mph; Humidity: 59%
63 yards	Brett Maher	Dallas Cowboys	37–10	Philadelphia Eagles	October 20, 2019	End of 1st half	AT&T Stadium	584 ft (179 m)	
63 yards	Joey Slye	New England Patriots	13–30	San Francisco 49ers	September 29, 2024	End of 1st half; broke franchise record for longest field goal	Levi's Stadium	16 ft (5 m)	78 °F (26 °C); Sunny
63 yards	Evan McPherson	Cincinnati Bengals	20–26	New England Patriots	November 23, 2025	End of 1st half; broke franchise record for longest field goal	Paycor Stadium	480 ft (150 m)	55 °F (13 °C); Sunny; Wind NW 2 mph
63 yards	Brandon Aubrey	Dallas Cowboys	30-44	Detroit Lions	December 4, 2025	Right-footed; kicked down 27–16 with 2:56 remaining in 3rd quarter. The sixth 60-yard kick of his career	Ford Field	601 ft (183 m)	Dome
62 yards	Matt Bryant	Tampa Bay Buccaneers	23–21	Philadelphia Eagles	October 22, 2006	Game-winning kick as time expired	Raymond James Stadium	35 ft (11 m)	
62 yards	Stephen Gostkowski	New England Patriots	33–8	Oakland Raiders	November 19, 2017	Right-footed; kicked as time expired at the end of the first half	Estadio Azteca	7,280 ft (2,220 m)	63 °F (17 °C); Mostly Cloudy
62 yards	Brett Maher	Dallas Cowboys	29–23 (OT)	Philadelphia Eagles	December 9, 2018	Right-footed; kicked as first half ended	AT&T Stadium	584 ft (179 m)	Retractable roof closed
62 yards	Brett Maher	Dallas Cowboys	22–24	New York Jets	October 13, 2019	Right-footed; kicked as first half ended	MetLife Stadium	7 ft (2.1 m)	64 °F (18 °C); mostly sunny; Wind: S at 7 mph; Humidity: 51%
62 yards	Matt Prater	Arizona Cardinals	34–33	Minnesota Vikings	September 19, 2021	Kicked as time expired at the end of the first half	State Farm Stadium	1,150 ft (350 m)	Retractable roof closed
62 yards	Harrison Butker	Kansas City Chiefs	20–24	Buffalo Bills	October 16, 2022	Tying kick as time expired at the end of the first half	Arrowhead Stadium	843 ft (257 m)	66 °F (19 °C); Sunny with NW wind at 15 mph
62 yards	Matt Prater	Arizona Cardinals	28–16	Dallas Cowboys	September 24, 2023	Kicked as time expired at the end of the first half	State Farm Stadium	1,150 ft (350 m)	Retractable roof closed
62 yards	Will Reichard	Minnesota Vikings	48–10	Cincinnati Bengals	September 21, 2025	Kicked as time expired at the end of the first half	U.S. Bank Stadium	840 ft (260 m)	Dome
61 yards	Sebastian Janikowski	Oakland Raiders	9–23	Cleveland Browns	December 27, 2009	Left-footed	Cleveland Browns Stadium		
61 yards	Jay Feely	Arizona Cardinals	16–19 (OT)	Buffalo Bills	October 14, 2012	Right-footed; longest game-tying field goal with 1:09 remaining in the 4th quarter, missed a 38-yard field goal that would have won the game at the end of regulation	University of Phoenix Stadium	1,150 ft (350 m)	Retractable roof closed
61 yards	Justin Tucker	Baltimore Ravens	18–16	Detroit Lions	December 16, 2013	Right-footed; game-winning field goal with 43 seconds remaining; sixth field goal of the game	Ford Field	601 ft (183 m)	Dome
61 yards	Greg Zuerlein	St. Louis Rams	18–21 (OT)	Minnesota Vikings	November 8, 2015	Right-footed	TCF Bank Stadium	869 ft (265 m)	58 °F (14 °C); sunny
61 yards	Jake Elliott	Philadelphia Eagles	27–24	New York Giants	September 24, 2017	Right-footed; game winning kick as time expired. Second game of NFL career. NFL rookie record for longest made field goal.	Lincoln Financial Field	39 ft (12 m)	91 °F (33 °C); sunny
61 yards	Jason Myers	Seattle Seahawks	16–23	Los Angeles Rams	November 15, 2020	Right-footed; 4th & 10, 0:02 time remaining, end of first half	SoFi Stadium	Sea level	Calm
61 yards	Ka'imi Fairbairn	Houston Texans	13–33	Seattle Seahawks	December 12, 2021	Right-footed	NRG Stadium	260 ft (79 m)	
61 yards	Greg Joseph	Minnesota Vikings	27–24	New York Giants	December 24, 2022	Right-footed; game-winning kick as time expired. Second longest field goal in Vikings franchise history. Third field goal of the season of more than 60 yards at U.S. Bank Stadium.	U.S. Bank Stadium	840 ft (260 m)	Dome
61 yards	Jake Elliott	Philadelphia Eagles	34–28	Minnesota Vikings	September 14, 2023	Right-footed; end of 1st half	Lincoln Financial Field	39 ft (12 m)	
61 yards	Joey Slye	Washington Commanders	31–38	Philadelphia Eagles	October 29, 2023	End of 1st half; broke franchise record for longest field goal	FedExField		69 °F (21 °C)
61 yards	Tyler Bass	Buffalo Bills	30–27	Miami Dolphins	November 3, 2024	Right-footed, game winner with :05 left in 4th quarter	Highmark Stadium	770 ft (235 m)	Sunny, 54 °F (12 °C)
61 yards	Brandon Aubrey	Dallas Cowboys	44–22	Washington Commanders	October 19, 2025	Right-footed, extended lead to 20–8 with 7:22 left in 2nd quarter	AT&T Stadium	584 ft (179 m)	Retractable roof closed
61 yards	Lucas Havrisik	Green Bay Packers	27–23	Arizona Cardinals	October 19, 2025	Right-footed, end of first half	State Farm Stadium	1,150 ft (350 m)	Retractable roof closed
60 yards	Steve Cox	Cleveland Browns	9–12	Cincinnati Bengals	October 21, 1984	Straight-ahead kick; on AstroTurf	Riverfront Stadium	490 ft (150 m)	
60 yards	Morten Andersen	New Orleans Saints	17–20	Chicago Bears	October 27, 1991	Left-footed; on AstroTurf; first 60-yard kick done indoors, as well as the first done with the soccer-style kick	Louisiana Superdome	Sea level	Dome
60 yards	Rob Bironas	Tennessee Titans	20–17	Indianapolis Colts	December 3, 2006	Right-footed; game winner with six seconds remaining	LP Field	400 ft (120 m)	
60 yards	Dan Carpenter	Miami Dolphins	10–13	Cleveland Browns	December 5, 2010	End of 1st half	Sun Life Stadium	5 ft (1.5 m)	77 °F (25 °C), wind SW at 14 mph (23 km/h)
60 yards	Greg Zuerlein	St. Louis Rams	19–13	Seattle Seahawks	September 30, 2012	In his rookie season; longest field goal in third quarter; also kicked a 58-yard field goal in the first quarter	Edward Jones Dome	466 ft (142 m)	Dome
60 yards	Chandler Catanzaro	Arizona Cardinals	18–33	Buffalo Bills	September 25, 2016	Longest field goal in career	New Era Field		
60 yards	Wil Lutz	New Orleans Saints	25–28	Minnesota Vikings	October 2, 2022	Kicked with 1:56 left in fourth quarter. Later missed a game-tying 61-yard attempt that struck the left upright and then the crossbar as time expired.	Tottenham Hotspur Stadium	13 m (43 ft)	
60 yards	Brett Maher	Dallas Cowboys	40–3	Minnesota Vikings	November 20, 2022	Made after initial make was called back due to review on previous play	U.S. Bank Stadium	840 ft (260 m)	Dome
60 yards	Greg Zuerlein	New York Jets	22–27	Minnesota Vikings	December 4, 2022	Right-footed; third career kick of more than 60 yards. Longest field goal in Jets franchise history.	U.S. Bank Stadium	840 ft (260 m)	Dome
60 yards	Harrison Butker	Kansas City Chiefs	19–8	Denver Broncos	October 12, 2023	Right-footed; kicked as time expired at the end of the first half	Arrowhead Stadium	843 ft (257 m)	67 °F (19.4 °C) Cloudy
60 yards	Brandon Aubrey	Dallas Cowboys	33–13	Philadelphia Eagles	December 10, 2023	Right footed; kicked with 0:50 in first quarter. Later kicked a 59-yarder in the third quarter with 4:49 left; first kicker in NFL to kick 59 yards or more twice in the same game.	AT&T Stadium	584 ft (179 m)	Retractable roof closed
60 yards	Brandon Aubrey	Dallas Cowboys	20–15	New York Giants	September 26, 2024	Right footed; kicked in the third quarter at 5:06 left in the quarter	MetLife Stadium	7 ft (2.1 m)	
60 yards	Chris Boswell	Pittsburgh Steelers	34–32	New York Jets	September 7, 2025	Right footed; kicked with 56 seconds left in the fourth quarter	MetLife Stadium	7 ft (2.1 m)	
60 yards	Blake Grupe	Indianapolis Colts	16–18	Seattle Seahawks	December 14, 2025	Right footed; kicked with 40 seconds left in the fourth quarter; lost after Jason Myers kicked a game winning 56 yard field goal with 11 seconds	Lumen Field		
60 yards	Daniel Carlson	Las Vegas Raiders	14–12	Kansas City Chiefs	January 4, 2026	Right footed; kicked with 8 seconds left in the fourth quarter	Allegiant Stadium	2,184 ft (666 m)	Dome
60 yards	Brandon Aubrey	Dallas Cowboys	37–20	Washington Commanders	September 20, 2026	Right footed; kicked in the fourth quarter with 13:22 left	AT&T Stadium	584 ft (179 m)	Retractable roof closed
60 yards	Chad Ryland	Arizona Cardinals	24–36	New York Giants	October 4, 2026	Right-footed; kicked before halftime	Metlife Stadium	–	–
60 yards	Cam Little	Jacksonville Jaguars	31–34	Houston Texans	October 18, 2026	Right-footed; game-tying kick with 2:00 remaining	Wembley Stadium		

== Unofficial records ==
=== Preseason ===
Field goals attempted in preseason games are not counted in the NFL's official record books, as is standard for NFL policy on statistics and records. In a preseason NFL game between the Denver Broncos and the Seattle Seahawks on August 29, 2002, Ola Kimrin kicked a 65-yard field goal, two yards longer than the NFL record that stood at that time. In another preseason NFL game between the Dallas Cowboys and the Las Vegas Raiders on August 17, 2024, Brandon Aubrey kicked a 66-yard field goal, matching the record length of the time. On August 9, 2025, in a Week 1 preseason game, Jacksonville Jaguars kicker Cam Little kicked a 70-yard field goal against the Pittsburgh Steelers, making it the longest recorded field goal in an organized game (the previous longest field goal was college kicker Ove Johansson's 69-yard kick in 1976). This came after the NFL approved the "K–ball rule" allowing kickers to bring their own broken-in footballs rather than having to break it in before the game. On August 22, 2026, Kansas City Chiefs kicker Harrison Butker kicked a 69-yard field goal to close out the first half of a preseason game against the Tampa Bay Buccaneers.

Distance	Kicker	Team	Result	Opponent	Date	Notes	Location	Elevation	Weather
70 yards	Cam Little	Jacksonville Jaguars	25–31	Pittsburgh Steelers	August 9, 2025	Longest recorded field goal in an organized game	EverBank Stadium	4 ft (1.2 m)	Stadium
69 yards	Harrison Butker	Kansas City Chiefs	15–16	Tampa Bay Buccaneers	August 22, 2026		Raymond James Stadium	36 ft (11 m)	Stadium
66 yards	Brandon Aubrey	Dallas Cowboys	27–12	Las Vegas Raiders	August 17, 2024	Was longest field goal in preseason for one year	Allegiant Stadium	2,184 ft (666 m)	Stadium
65 yards	Ola Kimrin	Denver Broncos	31–0	Seattle Seahawks	August 29, 2002	Stood as longest field goal in the preseason or regular season until 2021	Empower Field at Mile High	5,200 ft (1,600 m)	Stadium

=== Playoffs ===
The longest field goal made in the playoffs is tied at 58 yards between Pete Stoyanovich and Graham Gano. Stoyanovich made his on January 5, 1991, against the Kansas City Chiefs, while Gano made his on January 7, 2018, against the New Orleans Saints. Both of the longest field goals in playoff history were made in the Wild Card.

Distance	Kicker	Team	Result	Opponent	Date	Notes	Location	Elevation	Weather
58 yards	Pete Stoyanovich	Miami Dolphins	17–16	Kansas City Chiefs	January 5, 1991	Made in the Wild Card; Tied for longest playoff field goal made	Joe Robbie Stadium	10 ft (3.0 m)	–
58 yards	Graham Gano	Carolina Panthers	26–31	New Orleans Saints	January 7, 2018	Made in Wild Card; Tied for longest playoff field goal made	Mercedes-Benz Superdome	3 ft (0.91 m)	–
57 yards	Greg Zuerlein	Los Angeles Rams	26–23	New Orleans Saints	January 20, 2019	Made in Conference Championship; longest field goal made in the Conference Championship	Caesars Superdome	3 ft (0.91 m)	–
57 yards	Harrison Butker	Kansas City Chiefs	25–22	San Francisco 49ers	February 11, 2024	Made in Super Bowl LVIII; longest made in the Super Bowl	Allegiant Stadium	2,190 ft (670 m)	–
56 yards	Mason Crosby	Green Bay Packers	34–31	Dallas Cowboys	January 15, 2017	Made in Divisional Round; longest made in Divisional Round	AT&T Stadium	584 ft (178 m)	–
55 yards	Harrison Butker	Kansas City Chiefs	42–36	Buffalo Bills	January 23, 2022	Made in Divisional Round	GEHA Field at Arrowhead Stadium	843 ft (257 m)	–
55 yards	Jake Moody	San Francisco 49ers	22–25	Kansas City Chiefs	February 11, 2024	Made in Super Bowl LVIII	Allegiant Stadium	2,190 ft (670 m)	–

=== Super Bowl ===
The longest field goal in Super Bowl history is held by Harrison Butker at 57 yards, which he kicked on February 11, 2024, in Super Bowl LVIII. Before Butker's make, Jake Moody held it for a brief period in that same game at 55 yards. However, Steve Christie held the record at 54 yards for over three decades, which he made on January 30, 1994, in Super Bowl XXVIII.

Distance	Kicker	Team	Result	Opponent	Date	Notes	Location	Elevation	Weather
57 yards	Harrison Butker	Kansas City Chiefs	25–22	San Francisco 49ers	February 11, 2024	Made in Super Bowl LVIII; longest field goal in Super Bowl history	Allegiant Stadium	2,190 ft (670 m)	–
55 yards	Jake Moody	San Francisco 49ers	22–25	Kansas City Chiefs	February 11, 2024	Made in Super Bowl LVIII; stood as longest field goal in Super Bowl history before Butker broke it later in the same game	Allegiant Stadium	2,190 ft (670 m)	–
54 yards	Steve Christie	Buffalo Bills	13–30	Dallas Cowboys	January 30, 1994	Made in Super Bowl XXVIII; stood as longest field goal in Super Bowl history for over 30 years	Georgia Dome	1,050 ft (320 m)	–
53 yards	Greg Zuerlein	Los Angeles Rams	3–13	New England Patriots	February 3, 2019	Made in Super Bowl LIII; only points scored by the Rams in the game	Mercedes-Benz Stadium	1,050 ft (320 m)	–
53 yards	Jake Moody	San Francisco 49ers	22–25	Kansas City Chiefs	February 11, 2024	Made in Super Bowl LVIII	Allegiant Stadium	2,190 ft (670 m)	–
52 yards	Harrison Butker	Kansas City Chiefs	9–31	Tampa Bay Buccaneers	February 7, 2021	Made in Super Bowl LV	Raymond James Stadium	40 ft (12 m)	–
52 yards	Ryan Succop	Tampa Bay Buccaneers	31–9	Kansas City Chiefs	February 7, 2021	Made in Super Bowl LV	Raymond James Stadium	40 ft (12 m)	–
51 yards	Jason Elam	Denver Broncos	31–24	Green Bay Packers	January 25, 1998	Made in Super Bowl XXXII	Jack Murphy Stadium	56 ft (17 m)	–
50 yards	Jeff Wilkins	St. Louis Rams	17–20	New England Patriots	February 3, 2002	Made in Super Bowl XXXVI	Louisiana Superdome	−3 ft (−0.91 m)	–
50 yards	John Kasay	Carolina Panthers	29–32	New England Patriots	February 1, 2004	Made in Super Bowl XXXVIII	Reliant Stadium	52 ft (16 m)	–

== Longest missed field goal attempts ==
The longest field goal attempt in an NFL game was 65 yards by Sam Baker of the Washington Redskins against the Baltimore Colts on December 23, 1956, (Note: The NFL does not keep records of longest field goals attempted; therefore, it is impossible to know for certain the number of 70+ yard field goals attempted.) and stood for nearly 20 years. On October 26, 1975, Jan Stenerud of the Kansas City Chiefs attempted a 67 yard field goal, and would stand as the longest record for four years. In the 1979 season, the record switched three times. Mark Moseley beat the previous record when he attempted a 70 yard field goal on September 2. It was then beat on October 28, when Joe Danelo attempted a 71 yard field goal. It was then re-taken back by Moseley on November 25, when he attempted a 74 yard field goal. This would stand as the longest field goal attempted until Sebastian Janikowski attempted a 76 yard field goal on September 28, 2008.

Distance	Kicker	Team	Result	Opponent	Date	Notes	Location	Elevation	Weather
76 yards	Sebastian Janikowski	Oakland Raiders	18–28	San Diego Chargers	September 28, 2008	Left-footed; Longest NFL field goal attempted	Oakland-Alameda County Coliseum	−21 ft (−6.4 m)	–
74 yards	Mark Moseley	Washington Redskins	6–14	New York Giants	November 25, 1979	Right-footed; Longest fair catch kick; Longest field goal attempted until 2008	Giants Stadium	75 ft (23 m)	–
73 yards	Fred Steinfort	Denver Broncos	14–23	New England Patriots	September 29, 1980	Fair catch kick	Schaefer Stadium	218 ft (66 m)	–
71 yards	Joe Danelo	New York Giants	20–14	Los Angeles Rams	October 28, 1979	Longest field goal attempted until Moseley's fair catch kick a month later, also the longest non fair catch kick until 2008	Los Angeles Memorial Coliseum	155 ft (47 m)	–
71 yards	Phil Dawson	San Francisco 49ers	35–11	St. Louis Rams	September 26, 2013	Right-footed; fair catch kick	Edward Jones Dome	205 ft (62 m)	–
70 yards	Mark Moseley	Washington Redskins	27–29	Houston Oilers	September 2, 1979	Game-winning field goal attempt	Robert F. Kennedy Memorial Stadium	20 ft (6.1 m)	–
70 yards	Brandon McManus	Denver Broncos	31–32	Las Vegas Raiders	January 3, 2021	Blocked	Empower Field at Mile High	5,280 ft (1,610 m)	–
70 yards	Brandon Aubrey	Dallas Cowboys	30–14	Carolina Panthers	December 15, 2024	Missed short and left	Bank of America Stadium	660 ft (200 m)	–
70 yards	Cam Little	Jacksonville Jaguars	35–6	New England Patriots	September 27, 2026	Before halftime; had enough distance but missed right	EverBank Stadium	4 ft (1.2 m)	87 °F (31 °C)

== Longest missed field goal return records ==
Field goal returns are rare in the NFL, since an attempt with sufficient distance that misses the uprights will automatically be dead. Returns are possible when a field goal is short, but in that case returners will usually down the ball so as to scrimmage from the spot of the kick. Normally, a return will only be attempted when there is not enough time left in the half to run a play from scrimmage. Nevertheless, the following five field goals have been returned at least 107 yards for a touchdown in the 21st century. The record of 109 yards, set by Antonio Cromartie in 2007 and tied by Jamal Agnew in 2021, is the maximum number of yards that can be achieved on a scoring play:

Distance returned	Returner	Team	Opposing kicker	Opposing team	Distance attempted	Date	Location
109 yards	Antonio Cromartie	San Diego Chargers	Ryan Longwell	Minnesota Vikings	58 yards	November 4, 2007	Metrodome
109 yards	Jamal Agnew	Jacksonville Jaguars	Matt Prater	Arizona Cardinals	68 yards	September 26, 2021	TIAA Bank Field
108 yards	Devin Hester	Chicago Bears	Jay Feely	New York Giants	52 yards	November 12, 2006	Giants Stadium
108 yards	Nathan Vasher	Chicago Bears	Joe Nedney	San Francisco 49ers	52 yards	November 13, 2005	Soldier Field
107 yards	Chris McAlister	Baltimore Ravens	Jason Elam	Denver Broncos	57 yards	September 30, 2002	Ravens Stadium

== See also ==
- Field goal § Longest field goal records
