= Eastside Technical Center =

Location
- 2208 Liberty Road; Lexington, KY 40509; United States; 38°1′32.55″N 84°26′47.00″W

Information
- Type: Public
- School district: Fayette County Public Schools
- Grades: 9–12
- Website: https://eastside.fcps.net/

Eastside Technical Center was a public high school located in Lexington, Kentucky, United States, within the Fayette County Public School System. The school went beyond this boundary, Eastside Technical Center served students from all public high schools in Fayette, Jessamine, Scott, and Woodford Counties.

Their mission was to prepare their students for entry-level technical occupations, two-year community colleges, or two-year technical colleges and four-year universities.

== Academics ==
This Public High School Technical Center did this by providing many different vocational programs such as:

- Automotive and Transportation Technology
- Automotive Collision Repair
- Aviation and Aerospace Technology
- Cinematography and Video/Studio Production
- Diesel Technology
- Video Game Design and Development
- Fire and Emergency Services
- Heavy Equipment Technology
- Law Enforcement and Homeland Security
- Media Arts and News Broadcasting

Eastside Technical Center also offered academic or core classes for students, these include:

- Geometry
- Algebra II
- Advanced U.S. History
- Arts and Humanities

== History ==
The Eastside Technical Center opened its doors in 1978 under the name Northside Vocational Center. Like most technical centers across the state of Kentucky today, the school was operated and managed by the Kentucky Department of Education. Tom Wilson was the principal of Eastside Technical Center from its opening in 1978 to 1999.

When the school opened, students had the choice of the following programs of study:

- Auto
- Diesel
- Machine Tool Technology
- Industrial Mechanics
- Electricity
- Welding
- Horticulture
- Graphic Arts
- Health Sciences

Then Fayette County Public Schools took control of the technical center in 1987, thus renaming it "Eastside Technical Center." And some of the courses were then moved to Southside Technical Center, and some new were added to Eastside Technical Center.

Eastside was accredited by the Southern Association of Colleges and Schools.

== Administration ==
- Principal: Tracy Parks
- Assistant Principal: Cpt. Lisa Rudzinski

== Clubs ==
Eastside Technical Center was a partner in the following clubs: SkillsUSA, Student Technology Leadership Association, Technology Student Association, and the National Technical Honor Society. The SkillsUSA chapter was advised by Mr. Hunter Dean. The Student Technology Leadership Association Chapter was advised by Ms. Michelle Rauch. The Technology Student Association chapter was advised by Mr. Nathan Hoskins.
