= Meadowthorpe, Lexington =

Meadowthorpe
- Neighborhood of Lexington, Kentucky
- Interactive map of Meadowthorpe
- Coordinates: 38.071°N 84.525°W
- Country: United States
- State: Kentucky
- County: Fayette
- City: Lexington

Area
  - Total: 0.49 sq mi (1.27 km^{2})
- Elevation: 950.0 ft (289.56 m)

Population (2000)
  - Total: 1,460
  - Density: 2,977/sq mi (1,149.6/km^{2})
- Time zone: UTC-5 (Eastern (EST))
  - Summer (DST): UTC-4 (EDT)
- ZIP code: 40511
- Area code: 859
- Website: www.mnalex.org

Meadowthorpe is a neighborhood in western Lexington, Kentucky, United States. Its boundaries are Leestown Road to the south, New Circle Road to the west, and Norfolk Southern railroad tracks to the north and east. Since 2000, areas south of Leestown Road have seen residential and commercial development in Townley Center. This area is not a part of the Meadowthorpe neighborhood. Schools in the area are Meadowthorpe Elementary and Leestown Middle School.

== Neighborhood statistics ==
- Area: 0.489 square miles (1.27 km^{2})
- Population: 1,460
- Population density: 2,983 people per square mile (1,152 people/km^{2})
- Median household income: $47,217
