= Southside Technical Center =

Location
- 1800 Harrodsburg Road; Lexington, KY 40504
- Coordinates: 38.0286°N 84.5307°W

Information
- Type: Public
- School district: Fayette County Public Schools
- Principal: Daryn Morris
- Enrollment: 410
- Information: (859) 381-3603
- Website: http://www.southside.fcps.net/default.asp

Southside Technical Center is a public high school in Lexington, Kentucky, within the Fayette County Public School System.

== External links and references ==
- Southside Technical Center
