= Tates Creek High School =

Location
- 1111 Centre Parkway; Lexington, Kentucky 40517; United States; 37°59′05″N 84°28′45″W

Information
- School type: Public
- Founded: 1965
- School district: Fayette County Public Schools
- Principal: Kristy Field
- Staff: 102.60 (FTE)
- Grades: 9–12
- Enrollment: 1,733 (2023–2024)
- Student to teacher ratio: 16.89
- Colors: Maroon, white and black
- Nickname: Commodores and Lady Commodores
- Newspaper: The Masthead
- Website: tchs.fcps.net

Tates Creek High School (TCHS) is a public school in Lexington, Kentucky. The school is one of six high schools in the Fayette County Public Schools district.

== History ==
Tates Creek High School was built, and founded in 1965 as the last of three schools on the Tates Creek Campus. (Tates Creek Elementary School and Tates Creek Middle School being the other two.) In 1993, Tates Creek High underwent renovations to significantly increase its size. In August 2019, it was decided a new Tates Creek High School would be constructed behind the original building which opened on Wednesday, Aug. 10, 2022. The original building was demolished in June 2022.

== Notable alumni ==
- David Akers, NFL placekicker for the Philadelphia Eagles
- John Douglas (graduated 1973), conductor and music educator
- Trevor Gott (graduated 2010), NCAA baseball pitcher for the Kentucky Wildcats, MLB pitcher for the Los Angeles Angels, Washington Nationals, San Francisco Giants, Seattle Mariners and Milwaukee Brewers.
- Darrin Horn, NCAA basketball player for Western Kentucky Hilltoppers, men's head coach of his alma mater, Western Kentucky University, the University of South Carolina and the Northern Kentucky Norse.
- Kevin Jarvis, MLB pitcher for 11 teams and scout for the San Diego Padres
- Brian Littrell, of the Backstreet Boys.
- Tony Mack (graduated 1978), MLB pitcher for the California Angels
- Kenny McPeek, Thoroughbred racehorse trainer who has won the Belmont Stakes (2002)
- Lamin Swann, state representative
- Vince Taylor (graduated 1978), NCAA basketball player for the Duke Blue Devils, NBA player for the New York Knicks, NBA assistant coach for the Minnesota Timberwolves, and NCAA assistant coach for six teams over a span of over 20 years.
