= Henry Clay High School =

Location
- Fontaine Road; Lexington, Kentucky; United States

Information
- Type: Public high school
- Established: 1928; 98 years ago
- School district: Fayette County Public Schools
- Superintendent: Demetrus Liggins
- Principal: Tony Blackman
- Teaching staff: 120.30 (FTE)
- Enrollment: 1,990 (2023–2024)
- Student to teacher ratio: 16.54
- Colors: Blue & Gold
- Team name: Blue Devils
- USNWR ranking: #1705 (national); #18 (state)
- Website: henryclay.fcps.net

Henry Clay High School is an American public high school in Lexington, Kentucky. Opened on Main Street in 1928, it was named in honor of the Kentuckian and United States statesman, Henry Clay. The Main Street location now houses the main offices of the Fayette County Public Schools system. The school was ranked in 2022 by U.S. News & World Report as #18 of schools in Kentucky and #1,705 nationally. The school's facility on Fontaine Road opened in 1970.

== History ==
In 1834, the first four-room public school was built in Lexington. It was sponsored by a man named William Morton. Seventy years later, the first four-year high school in Lexington opened on the corner of Walnut and Short streets. This school was named Morton High School.

In 1927, the board of education granted permission for a new school to be built on East Main Street. On July 6, 1928, the board adopted the name Henry Clay High School, requested by the Daughters of the American Revolution.

== Demographics ==
The demographic breakdown by race/ethnicity of the 2,058 students enrolled for the 2021–2022 school year was:

Enrollment by Race/Ethnicity
School Year	Enrollment	American Indian / Alaska Native	Asian	Black	Hispanic	Native Hawaiian / Pacific Islander	White	Two or More Races
2018–19	2,137	8 (0.4%)	127 (5.9%)	429 (20.1%)	206 (9.6%)	1 (0%)	1,279 (59.9%)	87 (4.1%)
2020–21	2,054	1 (0%)	134 (6.5%)	391 (19%)	267 (13%)	1 (0%)	1,163 (56.6%)	97 (4.7%)
2021–22	2,058	2 (0.1%)	140 (6.8%)	406 (19.7%)	280 (13.6%)	1 (0%)	1,118 (54.3%)	111 (5.4%)

== Speech and debate team ==
The Henry Clay Speech and Debate team is currently led by coach Ryan Ray. The Debate team has won the Kentucky State championship 13 times, in 1991, 1992, 2007, 2011, 2014, 2015, 2016, 2017, 2018, 2019, 2020, 2021, 2022 and 2023.

== Athletics ==
HCHS offers many varsity sports including: Archery was added as a varsity sport in the 2012/2013 school year

- Football
- Baseball
- Volleyball (girls only)

HCHS also offers hockey, ultimate Frisbee, boys' volleyball, and lacrosse only as club sports since they are not sanctioned sports with the Kentucky High School Athletic Association, and the Blue Devil Marching Band in its own competitive arena. The HCHS Marching Band placed as Grand Champions in the Mid-states Band Association circuit for years 2005–2007, and reserved Grand Champions in 2008. In 2006, the ultimate Frisbee team, Grapes of Wrath, fought their way to a city championship, led by captain and team MVP, Steven Myers. The ultimate Frisbee team is currently enjoying a stellar 2008–2009 season which has included the City Championship and State Championship, as well as a top 10 national ranking by the UPA. Also the lacrosse team made it to the Division 2 State Championship in 2007 with an undefeated, 9–0 record. They lost to the Eastern Eagles in double overtime. In the 2012–2013 season, the Henry Clay men's lacrosse team posted an undefeated 18–0 record, defeating Lexington Catholic High School by a score of 10–4 to capture the Division 2 State Championship. During the 2012–2013 season the Henry Clay men's lacrosse team was ranked in the top ten nationally in goal defense and goal differential, while ranking eleventh nationally in goals scored.

== Notable alumni ==
- Andy Barr – American politician (born 1973) – U.S. Senator from Kentucky
- Andy Beshear – Governor of Kentucky since 2019
- Neil Chatterjee, former commissioner and chairman of the Federal Energy Regulatory Commission
- Dominic Black – American wrestler (born 1969) – former American freestyle and folkstyle wrestler
- Pamela Brown – newscaster
- Walker Buehler – American baseball player (born 1994)
- Collin Cowgill – American baseball player (born 1986)
- Randy Fine – American politician (born 1974) – U.S. Congressman, Florida House of Representatives, and Florida Senate; 1992 co-valedictorian
- Byron Ingram – American football player (born 1964)
- Gayl Jones – American poet (born 1949)
- Glenn Kessler - Washington Post editor and reporter (born 1959)
- Megan Kleine, 1992 Barcelona Olympic gold swimming medalist in the 4x100-meter Medley Relay. She was a State Champion swimming for Henry Clay.
- Frank Minnifield – NFL 1980s All-Decade Team cornerback for the Cleveland Browns
