= National Register of Historic Places listings in Franklin County, Kentucky =

Location of Franklin County in Kentucky

This is a list of the National Register of Historic Places listings in Franklin County, Kentucky.

This is intended to be a complete list of the properties and districts on the National Register of Historic Places in Franklin County, Kentucky, United States. The locations of National Register properties and districts for which the latitude and longitude coordinates are included below, may be seen in a map.

There are 59 properties and districts listed on the National Register in the county, of which 3 are National Historic Landmarks.

This National Park Service list is complete through NPS recent listings posted June 13, 2025.

== Current listings ==
	Name on the Register	Image	Date listed	Location	City or town	Description
1	Col. R.T.P. Allen House	Col. R.T.P. Allen House	July 10, 1979 (#79000984)	South of Frankfort on Johnson Rd. 38°10′14″N 84°51′40″W	Frankfort	Photo does not match nomination photo. No longer extant.
2	Archeological Site 15 Fr 26		March 31, 1978 (#78001331)	Address Restricted	Harvieland	
3	Archeological Site 15 Fr 34		February 17, 1978 (#78001326)	Address Restricted	Frankfort	
4	Archeological Site 15 Fr 52		February 14, 1978 (#78001330)	Address Restricted	Harvieland	
5	Archeological Site 15 FR 368		September 12, 1985 (#85002370)	Address Restricted	Frankfort	Fort Hill, a Civil War fort
6	Arrowhead		September 28, 1989 (#89001597)	U.S. Route 60, 0.5 miles (0.80 km) south of Hanley Ln. 38°10′44″N 84°49′10″W	Frankfort	
7	Beeches		February 9, 1979 (#79000985)	Off U.S. Route 421; 38°12′46″N 84°52′01″W	Frankfort	
8	George F. Berry House	George F. Berry House	September 6, 2002 (#02000915)	700 Louisville Rd. 38°11′15″N 84°52′57″W	Frankfort	
9	Blanton-Crutcher Farm		October 29, 1975 (#75000757)	5 miles (8.0 km) southeast of Frankfort off U.S. Route 60; 38°09′37″N 84°49′13″W	Frankfort	
10	Bridgeport School		January 8, 2014 (#13001049)	555 Bridgeport Rd. 38°09′38″N 84°56′54″W	Bridgeport	
11	Brown-Henry House	Brown-Henry House	January 8, 2014 (#13001050)	818 Fields Ave. 38°12′42″N 84°51′24″W	Frankfort	
12	Capital Plaza Hotel		August 22, 2024 (#100010696)	405 Wilkinson Boulevard; 38°12′09″N 84°52′43″W	Frankfort	
13	Central Frankfort Historic District	Central Frankfort Historic District	July 28, 2009 (#09000570)	Bounded by E. and W. 2nd St., Logan St., the Kentucky River, High St., and Mero St. 38°11′44″N 84°52′34″W	Frankfort	
14	Chapel on the Forks		December 7, 2020 (#100005892)	3984 Georgetown Rd. 38°12′55″N 84°47′54″W	Frankfort	
15	Colored Soldiers Monument in Frankfort	Colored Soldiers Monument in Frankfort	July 17, 1997 (#97000701)	Greenhill Cemetery, 0.1 miles (0.16 km) southeast of the junction of E. Main St. and Myrtle Ave. 38°12′18″N 84°50′18″W	Frankfort	
16	Confederate Monument in Frankfort	Confederate Monument in Frankfort	July 17, 1997 (#97000702)	215 E. Main St. 38°11′48″N 84°52′05″W	Frankfort	
17	Corner in Celebrities Historic District	Corner in Celebrities Historic District	March 11, 1971 (#71000343)	Roughly bounded by the Kentucky River on the south and the west, St. Clair and Main Sts. 38°11′57″N 84°52′46″W	Frankfort	
18	Dills Site		March 21, 1978 (#78001327)	Address Restricted	Frankfort	
19	Frankfort Barracks District	Frankfort Barracks District	November 20, 1975 (#75000758)	Bounded by New, Shelby, and Coke Sts., and Woodland Ave. 38°11′19″N 84°52′38″W	Frankfort	
20	Frankfort Cemetery and Chapel	Frankfort Cemetery and Chapel	July 12, 1974 (#74000872)	215 E. Main St. 38°11′38″N 84°51′56″W	Frankfort	
21	Frankfort Commercial Historic District	Frankfort Commercial Historic District	May 10, 1979 (#79000986)	Both sides of the Kentucky River at Bridge St. 38°11′54″N 84°52′39″W	Frankfort	Includes the Odd Fellows Temple and Singing Bridge.
22	Frankfort Greenhouses	Frankfort Greenhouses	October 9, 1997 (#97000233)	210, 212, and 216 E. Main St. 38°11′54″N 84°52′01″W	Frankfort	
23	Frankfort Storage Building-Armory	Frankfort Storage Building-Armory	September 6, 2002 (#02000929)	208 Maryland Ave. 38°11′48″N 84°51′31″W	Frankfort	
24	Giltner-Holt House		May 5, 1978 (#78001328)	5 miles (8.0 km) north of Frankfort; 38°15′03″N 84°50′01″W	Frankfort	
25	Glen Willis	Glen Willis	June 13, 1972 (#72000531)	Leestown Pike; 38°12′37″N 84°52′20″W	Frankfort	
26	Gooch House	Gooch House	April 30, 1980 (#80001528)	104 2nd St. 38°11′42″N 84°52′29″W	Frankfort	
27	Green Hill Cemetery		January 11, 2024 (#100010763)	Intersection of East Main Street (U.S. 60) and Atwood Avenue; 38°12′15″N 84°50′21″W	Frankfort	
28	Green Hill Missionary Baptist Church		January 11, 2024 (#100009725)	127 Greenhill Avenue; 38°12′13″N 84°50′10″W	Frankfort	
29	Haggin Farm		June 23, 1983 (#83002773)	KY 1685; 38°11′24″N 84°44′25″W	Midway	
30	Andrew Hearn Log House and Farm	Andrew Hearn Log House and Farm	August 11, 1976 (#76000886)	3 miles (4.8 km) southwest of Jett on Hanley Lane; 38°09′26″N 84°50′08″W	Jett	
31	E.E. Hume Hall		May 26, 1983 (#83004050)	Kentucky State University campus 38°12′07″N 84°51′21″W	Frankfort	
32	Hutcherson Site		March 21, 1978 (#78001332)	Address Restricted	Polsgrove	
33	Jackson Hall, Kentucky State University	Jackson Hall, Kentucky State University	April 11, 1973 (#73000802)	E. Main St. 38°12′10″N 84°51′29″W	Frankfort	
34	Julian Farm		May 26, 1988 (#88000670)	Southern side of U.S. Route 60; 38°09′51″N 84°55′49″W	Bridgeport	
35	Kentucky Governor's Mansion	Kentucky Governor's Mansion	February 1, 1972 (#72000532)	Eastern lawn of the Capitol at the end of Capital Ave. 38°11′58″N 84°52′25″W	Frankfort	House built by two men who later each became Governor and lived there.
36	Kentucky State Arsenal	Kentucky State Arsenal	April 11, 1973 (#73000803)	Main St. at Capital Ave. 38°11′51″N 84°52′22″W	Frankfort	
37	Kentucky State Capitol	Kentucky State Capitol	April 13, 1973 (#73000804)	Capitol grounds at end of Capital Ave. 38°11′12″N 84°52′33″W	Frankfort	
38	Knight-Taylor-Hockensmith House		June 25, 2013 (#13000475)	4350 Peaks Mill Road; 38°16′10″N 84°48′49″W	Frankfort	
39	Liberty Hall	Liberty Hall	November 11, 1971 (#71000344)	218 Wilkinson St. 38°11′59″N 84°52′52″W	Frankfort	
40	Gov. Charles S. Morehead House	Gov. Charles S. Morehead House	December 30, 1974 (#74000873)	217 Shelby St. 38°11′39″N 84°52′33″W	Frankfort	
41	Old Governor's Mansion	Old Governor's Mansion	March 11, 1971 (#71000345)	420 High St. 38°11′58″N 84°52′26″W	Frankfort	
42	Old Statehouse	Old Statehouse	March 11, 1971 (#71000346)	On Broadway, bounded by Madison, Clinton, and Lewis Sts. 38°12′01″N 84°52′36″W	Frankfort	
43	Old Statehouse Historic District	Old Statehouse Historic District	June 19, 1980 (#80001529)	Roughly bounded by Broadway, Blanton, St. Clair, Ann, and High Sts. 38°12′02″N 84°52′29″W	Frankfort	
44	Old Stone Tavern	Old Stone Tavern	June 23, 1983 (#83002774)	Scruggs Lane and Leestown Pike; 38°11′16″N 84°48′02″W	Frankfort	
45	Old U.S. Courthouse and Post Office	Old U.S. Courthouse and Post Office	July 3, 1974 (#74000874)	305 Wapping St. 38°11′51″N 84°52′45″W	Frankfort	
46	Charles Patterson House		June 23, 1983 (#83002775)	KY 1689; 38°14′00″N 84°46′33″W	Frankfort	
47	Penn-Marshall Stone House		June 5, 1975 (#75000760)	East of Harvieland on Stoney Creek Rd. at the Kentucky River; 38°15′28″N 84°53′43″W	Harvieland	
48	Point Breeze	Point Breeze	January 8, 2014 (#13001051)	219 Riverview St. 38°11′00″N 84°52′41″W	Frankfort	
49	Risk Brothers Site		November 21, 1978 (#78001329)	Address Restricted	Frankfort	
50	Scotland		December 12, 1976 (#76000883)	5 miles (8.0 km) east of Frankfort on Versailles Rd. 38°10′16″N 84°48′12″W	Frankfort	
51	South Frankfort Neighborhood Historic District	South Frankfort Neighborhood Historic District	August 19, 1982 (#82002698)	Roughly bounded by U.S. Route 60, Rockland Ct., and the Kentucky River; also roughly bounded by U.S. Route 60, Taylor Ave., the Kentucky River, and the Tanglewood subdivision 38°11′28″N 84°52′33″W	Frankfort	Second set of boundaries represents a boundary increase of July 30, 2013
52	George T. Stagg Distillery	George T. Stagg Distillery	May 2, 2001 (#01000450)	1001 Wilkinson Boulevard; 38°12′59″N 84°52′09″W	Frankfort	Designated a National Historic Landmark on February 27, 2013
53	Stewart Home School		June 3, 1976 (#76000884)	5.5 miles (8.9 km) south of Frankfort on U.S. Route 127; 38°07′35″N 84°54′28″W	Frankfort	
54	Switzer Covered Bridge	Switzer Covered Bridge	September 6, 1974 (#74000875)	Off Rocky Branch Rd., over North Elkhorn Creek; 38°15′14″N 84°45′08″W	Switzer	
55	Robert Todd Summer Home		June 23, 1983 (#83002776)	U.S. Route 421; 38°10′50″N 84°47′13″W	Frankfort	
56	Andrew Trumbo Log House		November 17, 1977 (#77000618)	East of Frankfort on Glenns Creek Rd. 38°10′29″N 84°50′53″W	Frankfort	
57	Valley Farm Ruins		July 24, 1975 (#75000759)	Address Restricted	Frankfort	
58	Weehawken		April 24, 2007 (#07000283)	1 Weehawken Ln. 38°11′44″N 84°49′20″W	Jett	
59	Rev. Jesse R. Zeigler House	Rev. Jesse R. Zeigler House	May 3, 1976 (#76000885)	509 Shelby St. 38°11′25″N 84°52′35″W	Frankfort	

== See also ==
- List of National Historic Landmarks in Kentucky
- National Register of Historic Places listings in Kentucky
