= Frankfort micropolitan area, Kentucky =

Frankfort Micropolitan Area
- Micropolitan Statistical Area
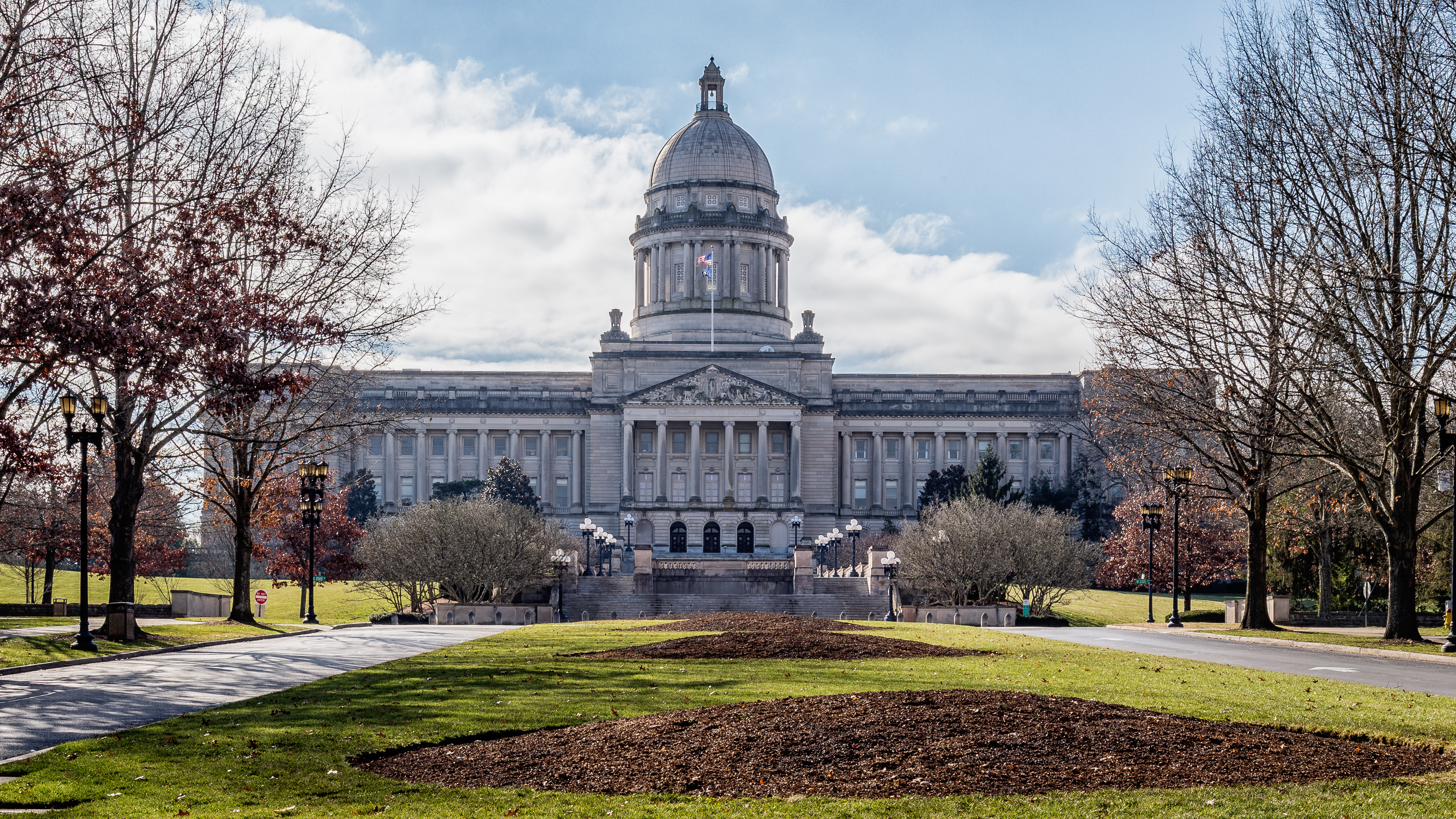
- Kentucky State Capitol Front Exterior
Map of Lexington-Fayette–Frankfort–Richmond, KY CSA
City of Frankfort
Frankfort, KY µSA
Other Counties in the Lexington, KY CSA
- Country: United States
- State: Kentucky
- Largest city: Lexington

Area
  - MSA: 1,484.07 sq mi (3,843.7 km^{2})

Population (2020)
  - Total: 516,811 ▲ (109th)
- Time zone: UTC−5 (EST)
  - Summer (DST): UTC−4 (EDT)
- Area codes: 859, 502

The Frankfort Micropolitan Statistical Area, as defined by the United States Census Bureau, is an area consisting of two counties in central Kentucky, anchored by the city of Frankfort. As of the 2000 census, the Micropolitan Statistical Area (μSA) had a population of 66,798 (though a July 1, 2009 estimate placed the population at 70,758).

The Frankfort Micropolitan Statistical Area is part of the Lexington-Fayette–Richmond–Frankfort, KY combined statistical area.

== Counties ==
- Anderson
- Franklin

== Communities ==
=== Incorporated places ===
- Frankfort (Principal city)
- Lawrenceburg

=== Unincorporated places ===
- Bridgeport
- Forks of Elkhorn
- Glensboro
- Jett
- Switzer
- Choateville

== Demographics ==
As of the census of 2000, there were 66,798 people, 27,227 households, and 18,336 families residing within the μSA. The racial makeup of the μSA was 90.42% White, 7.35% African American, 0.13% Native American, 0.55% Asian, 0.02% Pacific Islander, 0.44% from other races, and 1.08% from two or more races. Hispanic or Latino of any race were 1.02% of the population.

The median income for a household in the μSA was $42,722, and the median income for a family was $50,945. Males had a median income of $32,976 versus $25,627 for females. The per capita income for the μSA was $19,925.

== See also ==
- Kentucky census statistical areas
