= Gippy Graham =

American politician (born 1929)

Mayor of Frankfort
- In office January 1, 2009 – January 1, 2013
- Preceded by: Bill May
- Succeeded by: Bill May

Member of the Kentucky House of Representatives from the 57th district
- In office January 1, 1995 – January 1, 2003
- Preceded by: Hank Hancock
- Succeeded by: Derrick Graham

Personal details
- Born: Harry Gibson Graham; February 14, 1929 (age 97) Franklin County, Kentucky, U.S.
- Party: Democratic

Harry Gibson "Gippy" Graham (born February 14, 1929) is a retired American politician and educator who served as a member of the Kentucky House of Representatives and as mayor of Frankfort, Kentucky.

== Early life ==
Graham was born on February 14, 1929, in Franklin County, Kentucky to Llewellyn Marshall, a carpenter, and Mattie Fitzgerald Graham, a distillery worker. He is the youngest of five and graduated from the now-defunct Elkhorn High School (now Franklin County) in 1947. He played basketball all four years and served as captain from 1945 to 1946. He served as class president for two years.

== Education and career ==
Graham earned his associate degree from Cumberland College and a bachelor's degree in sociology and economics from Georgetown College in 1952. He was a basketball player while at Georgetown and initially intended to become a social worker before deciding to work in education.

He served in the United States Air Force between 1954 and 1956. He was initially an Airman stationed at Scott Air Force Base, and was a player coach for the basketball team. When he returned, he worked as a teacher and basketball coach at Georgetown High School before pursuing his master's degree in education administration at the University of Kentucky. After graduating in 1958, he returned to Georgetown and stayed for an additional seven years, where he was a teacher, basketball coach, and at one point even held the role of acting principal. He worked with Bob Davis while at Georgetown High.

He eventually left Georgetown to coach basketball and track and teach at Kentucky Southern College (KSC). KSC folded due to financial problems in 1969 and was absorbed by the University of Louisville. He then worked for the State Highway Department in Frankfort as an administrative assistant from 1969 to 1971 and briefly coached basketball at Danville Bate Junior High in 1971. Graham coached basketball and taught social studies at Boyle County High School from 1971 to 1975. He then served as Director of Community Education at the Kentucky Department of Education for 11 years before resigning in 1987 to focus on his bid for Superintendent of Public Instruction. Graham supported secularism rather than religious instruction in public schools, and did not support banning books unless strictly necessary. He finished fourth of six candidates.

Graham served in Kentucky House of Representatives as a representative for the 57th district for four consecutive terms from 1995 until 2003. He did not run for reelection in 2002. In 2003, he ran for Kentucky's secretary of state against Russ Maple and Joe B. Lanter. His platform included increasing parent involvement; improving early childhood programs, including instituting an all-day kindergarten option rather than only half-day; hiring counselors for elementary schools; and screening students for special needs. He lost to Maple by 3%, or 8,373 votes, in the Democratic primaries.

He was elected Mayor of Frankfort in 2008, succeeding Bill May, who did not seek re-election due to state law prohibiting campaigning for a fourth consecutive term. He was inaugurated on January 1, 2009. Graham did not campaign for re-election in 2012 and May was re-elected.

His honors and awards include the National Guard's Kentucky Distinguished Service Award; the Kentucky Court of Justice's Civitas International Award; the Paul Sullivan Award from the Frankfort Area Chamber of Commerce; the Kentucky Public Retiree's Harry Lee Waterfield Award; the National Community Education Hall of Fame; Outstanding Public Servant Award from the Kentucky Academy of Trial Lawyers; Teacher of the Year at Georgetown City Schools; Physical Educator of the Year from Georgetown Optimist Club; Central Kentucky Conference Coach of the Year; Ambassador of Goodwill from the City of Louisville; All-Kentucky Intercollegiate Athletic Conference basketball player.

== Personal life ==
Graham and Carol Miller, who he met while studying at Cumberland College, were engaged in August 1951 and had three children: Lynn, Randy, and Ray. Following their divorce, Graham entered a committed relationship with Karen Schmalzbauer, who has worked extensively in Kentucky's Department of Education. Schmalzbauer is one of the founders of Hope Harbor, a non-profit counseling center that supports survivors of sexual assault and their families. Carol retired from teaching at the Kentucky School for the Deaf and died in 2014. Randy is a children's book author and Emergency Manager, Ray is a high school coach, and Lynne was a housewife.
