= Valley Farm Ruins =

- U.S. National Register of Historic Places
- Nearest city: Frankfort, Kentucky
- Area: 9.9 acres (4.0 ha)
- Built: 1784
- Architectural style: Federal
- NRHP reference No.: 75000759
- Added to NRHP: July 24, 1975

Valley Farm Ruins is the remaining structures of an historic estate on the banks of Elkhorn Creek in Franklin County, Kentucky near the Woodford County line. The property was added to the United States National Register of Historic Places on July 24, 1975.
