= Albert Lee Ueltschi =

American aviator (1917–2012)

Albert Lee Ueltschi (May 15, 1917 – October 18, 2012) is considered the father of modern flight training and was the founder of FlightSafety International. Ueltschi was once personal pilot to Juan Trippe and an associate to Charles Lindbergh. On July 21, 2001, he was enshrined at Dayton, Ohio in the National Aviation Hall of Fame, along with test pilot Joe Engle, United States Marine Corps flying ace Marion Carl, and USAF ace Robin Olds. In 2013, Flying magazine ranked Ueltschi number 13 on its list of the "51 Heroes of Aviation".

== Life and career ==
Al Ueltschi was born and raised in Franklin County, Kentucky. He was the youngest of seven children of Robert and Lena Ueltschi. For the first four years of schooling he attended a one-room school in Choateville, Kentucky until the family moved to Frankfort, Kentucky. Inspired by the new White Castle in town, at age 16 he opened a hamburger stand named "Little Hawk" across town from the chain restaurant and near his high school to pay for flying lessons. His first airplane, purchased using profits earned from Little Hawk, was a Waco 10. Ueltschi attended the University of Kentucky for a year but dropped out and instead started a barnstorming career, eventually teaching student pilots at the Queen City Flying Service in Cincinnati. On one occasion, he survived falling out of his airplane while on an instruction flight, parachuting into a briar patch while his student landed safely on his own.

He began his career with Pan Am in 1941 as Juan Trippe's private pilot, retiring in 1968 at the age of 50. While employed with Pan Am, Ueltschi married his wife Eileen in June 1944.

He founded FlightSafety International in 1951, the world's foremost aviation training organization, after noticing that corporate pilots did not receive the same rigorous training as airline pilots had. His first endorsement came from Trippe, who was President of Pan Am at the time. Ueltschi stepped down as President of FlightSafety in 2003, yet remained Chairman. The motto he started with still remains with FlightSafety today: "The best safety device in any aircraft is a well-trained crew." Berkshire Hathaway acquired FlightSafety in late 1996.

He spent his winters in Vero Beach, Florida, but worked daily in the warmer months at FlightSafety's headquarters at the Marine Air Terminal at LaGuardia Airport in Flushing, Queens, New York.

== Philanthropy ==
Ueltschi was a contributor to Orbis International, a nonprofit, global development organization which operates a flying eye hospital (utilizing a specially equipped McDonnell Douglas DC-10) that offers sight-saving surgery and training to doctors around the world, with the stated mission of eliminating avoidable cases of blindness in developing countries.

In 2010, Ueltschi cofounded HelpMeSee with his son Jim, to address cataract blindness in the developing world by training thousands of cataract specialists using techniques developed by Ueltschi himself.

On September 18, 2012, Ueltschi signed The Giving Pledge, noting his commitment to cataract relief.

The National Business Aviation Association offers the Al Ueltschi Award for Humanitarian Leadership, given in recognition of "the spirit of service demonstrated by humanitarian leaders within the business aviation community."
