= Derrick Graham (politician) =

American politician (born 1958)

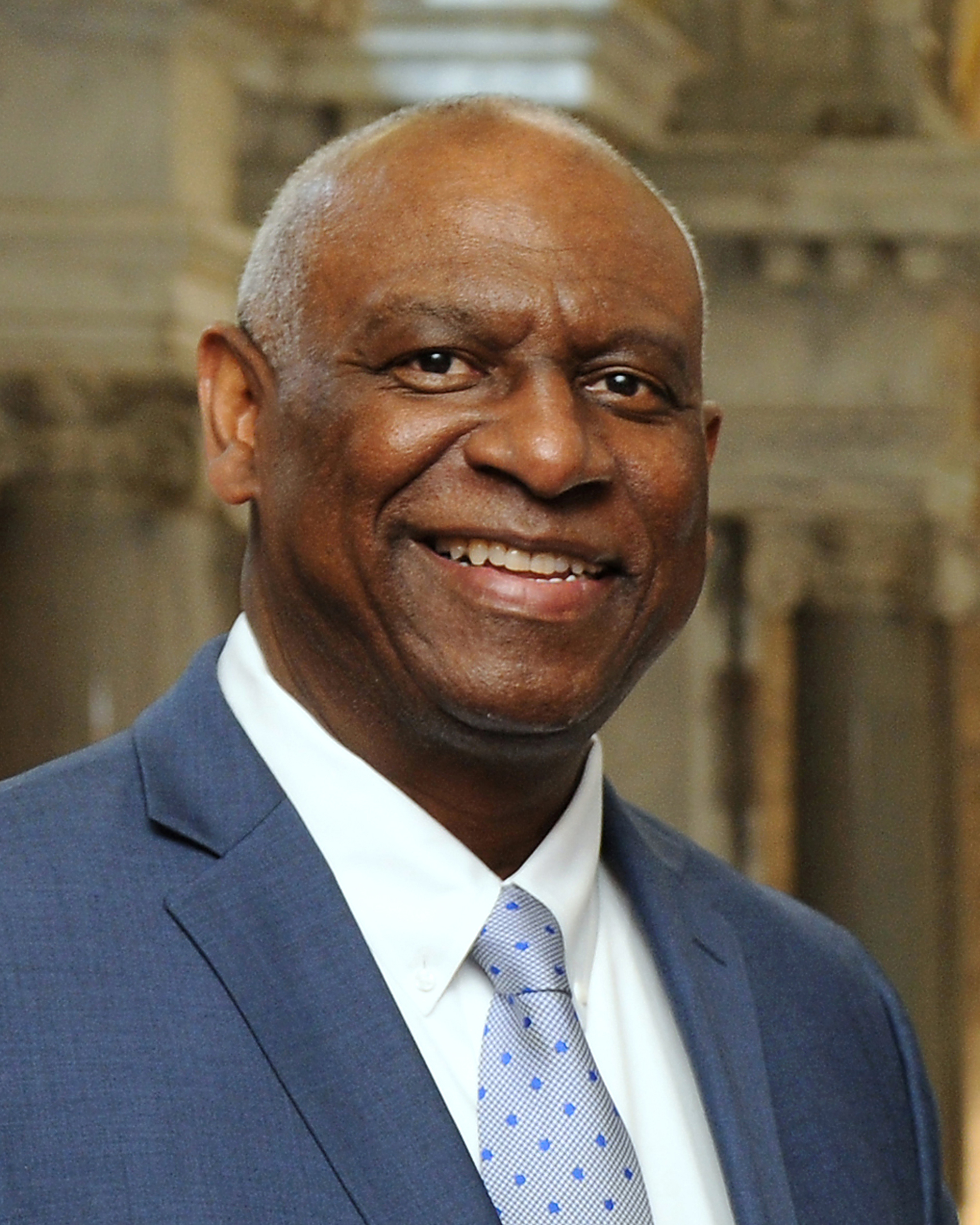

Minority Leader of the Kentucky House of Representatives
- In office January 3, 2023 – January 1, 2025
- Preceded by: Joni Jenkins
- Succeeded by: Pamela Stevenson

Member of the Kentucky House of Representatives from the 57th district
- In office January 1, 2003 – January 1, 2025
- Preceded by: Gippy Graham
- Succeeded by: Erika Hancock

Personal details
- Born: Derrick Wayne Graham; June 9, 1958 (age 68) Frankfort, Kentucky, U.S.
- Party: Democratic
- Education: Kentucky State University (BA); Ohio State University (MA)
- Website: Campaign website

Derrick Wayne Graham (born June 9, 1958) is an American politician and a former Democratic member of the Kentucky House of Representatives who represented the 57th district, which includes the Kentucky capital city of Frankfort, since January 2003. In 2023, Graham became the first African American to lead a legislative caucus in the Kentucky House of Representatives.

Graham did not seek reelection in 2024.

== Background ==
Graham earned his Bachelor of Arts in history and political science from Kentucky State University and his Master of Arts in political science from Ohio State University.

For the majority of his career, Graham taught social studies at Frankfort High School. During the 1990s, Graham was elected as a Frankfort city commissioner.

== Elections ==
- 1994 When the District 57 seat was open, Graham ran in the seven-way 1994 Democratic Primary but lost to Gippy Graham, who was unopposed for the November 8, 1994 General election.
- 2002 When Representative Gippy Graham left the Legislature and left the seat open, Derrick Graham won the four-way 2002 Democratic Primary with 5,023 votes (44.7%) and won the November 5, 2002 General election with 8,209 votes (61.9%) against Republican nominee Joel Schrader.
- 2004 Graham was unopposed for both the 2004 Democratic Primary and the November 2, 2004 General election, winning with 14,432 votes.
- 2006 Graham was unopposed for both the 2006 Democratic Primary and the November 7, 2006 General election, winning with 11,938 votes.
- 2008 Graham was unopposed for the 2008 Democratic Primary and won the November 4, 2008 General election with 14,015 votes (74.7%) against Republican nominee Frank Haynes.
- 2010 Graham was unopposed for the May 18, 2010 Democratic Primary and won the November 2, 2010 General election with 11,282 votes (67.0%) against Republican nominee Paul Estep.
- 2012 Graham was unopposed for the May 22, 2012 Democratic Primary and won the November 6, 2012 General election with 11,639 votes (63.9%) against Republican nominee Donald Stosberg, who had run for the seat in 2000 and 2002.
- 2014 Graham was unopposed for both the May 20, 2014 Democratic Primary and the 2014 Kentucky House of Representatives election, winning with 13,384 votes.
- 2016 Graham was unopposed for both the May 17, 2016 Democratic Primary and the 2016 Kentucky House of Representatives election, winning with 15,747 votes.
- 2018 Graham was unopposed for the May 22, 2018 Democratic Primary and won the 2018 Kentucky House of Representatives election with 11,726 votes (64.8%) against Republican candidate Calen Studler.
- 2020 Graham was unopposed in the 2020 Democratic Primary and won the 2020 Kentucky House of Representatives election with 13,202 votes (61.4%) against Republican candidate Gary Stratton.
- 2022 Graham was unopposed in the 2022 Democratic Primary and won the 2022 Kentucky House of Representatives election with 10,066 votes (62.4%) against Republican candidate Gary Stratton.

Kentucky House of Representatives
Preceded by Joni Jenkins	Minority Leader of the Kentucky House of Representatives; 2023–2025	Succeeded by Pamela Stevenson
