= Choateville, Kentucky =

Unincorporated community in Kentucky, United States

- Unincorporated community
- Location within Kentucky Location within the United States
- Coordinates: 38°12′.26″N 84°54′27.82″W
- Country: United States
- State: Kentucky
- County: Franklin
- Elevation: 784 ft (239 m)
- Time zone: UTC-5 (Eastern (EST))
  - Summer (DST): UTC-4 (EDT)
- ZIP code: 40601
- Area code: 502
- GNIS feature ID: 517007

Choateville is an unincorporated community on the western side of Franklin County, Kentucky along Kentucky Highway 1005 and Benson Creek. It is also a Census Designated Place (2629590).

It currently has an elementary school of the Franklin County Public Schools, store, Baptist church, Christian church, and a Ruritan Club.

Albert Lee Ueltschi attended a one-room school in Choateville for four years before moving to Frankfort.
