= Kentucky's 57th House of Representatives district =

American legislative district

Kentucky's 57th State House of Representatives district
Representative
Erika Hancock; D–Frankfort
since January 1, 2025
- Registration: 56.5% Democratic; 33.1% Republican; 9.8% No party preference
- Demographics: 79.2% White; 10.1% Black; 4.3% Hispanic; 2.2% Asian; 0.2% Hawaiian/Pacific Islander; 0.1% Other; 3.8% Multiracial
- Population (2024): 42,281
- Registered voters (2026): 31,634

Kentucky's 57th House of Representatives district is one of 100 districts in the Kentucky House of Representatives. Located in the central part of the state, it comprises part of Franklin County. It has been represented by Erika Hancock (D–Frankfort) since 2025. As of 2024, the district had a population of 42,281.

== Voter registration ==
On January 1, 2026, the district had 31,634 registered voters, who were registered with the following parties.

Party	Registration	
Party	Voters	%
Democratic	17,874	56.50
Republican	10,482	33.14
Independent	1,672	5.29
Libertarian	134	0.42
Green	29	0.09
Constitution	17	0.05
Socialist Workers	9	0.03
Reform	1	0.00
"Other"	1,416	4.48
Total	31,634	100.00

== List of members representing the district ==
Member	Party	Years	Electoral history	District location
Hank Hancock (Frankfort)	Democratic	January 1, 1974 – January 1, 1995	Elected in 1973. Reelected in 1975. Reelected in 1977. Reelected in 1979. Reelected in 1981. Reelected in 1984. Reelected in 1986. Reelected in 1988. Reelected in 1990. Reelected in 1992. Retired.	1974–1985; Franklin County (part).
Hank Hancock (Frankfort)	Democratic	January 1, 1974 – January 1, 1995	Elected in 1973. Reelected in 1975. Reelected in 1977. Reelected in 1979. Reelected in 1981. Reelected in 1984. Reelected in 1986. Reelected in 1988. Reelected in 1990. Reelected in 1992. Retired.	1985–1993; Franklin County (part).
Hank Hancock (Frankfort)	Democratic	January 1, 1974 – January 1, 1995	Elected in 1973. Reelected in 1975. Reelected in 1977. Reelected in 1979. Reelected in 1981. Reelected in 1984. Reelected in 1986. Reelected in 1988. Reelected in 1990. Reelected in 1992. Retired.	1993–1997; Franklin County (part).
Gippy Graham (Frankfort)	Democratic	January 1, 1995 – January 1, 2003	Elected in 1994. Reelected in 1996. Reelected in 1998. Reelected in 2000. Retired.	1993–1997; Franklin County (part).
Gippy Graham (Frankfort)	Democratic	January 1, 1995 – January 1, 2003	Elected in 1994. Reelected in 1996. Reelected in 1998. Reelected in 2000. Retired.	1997–2003
Derrick Graham (Frankfort)	Democratic	January 1, 2003 – January 1, 2025	Elected in 2002. Reelected in 2004. Reelected in 2006. Reelected in 2008. Reelected in 2010. Reelected in 2012. Reelected in 2014. Reelected in 2016. Reelected in 2018. Reelected in 2020. Reelected in 2022. Retired.	2003–2015
Derrick Graham (Frankfort)	Democratic	January 1, 2003 – January 1, 2025	Elected in 2002. Reelected in 2004. Reelected in 2006. Reelected in 2008. Reelected in 2010. Reelected in 2012. Reelected in 2014. Reelected in 2016. Reelected in 2018. Reelected in 2020. Reelected in 2022. Retired.	2015–2023
Derrick Graham (Frankfort)	Democratic	January 1, 2003 – January 1, 2025	Elected in 2002. Reelected in 2004. Reelected in 2006. Reelected in 2008. Reelected in 2010. Reelected in 2012. Reelected in 2014. Reelected in 2016. Reelected in 2018. Reelected in 2020. Reelected in 2022. Retired.	2023–present
Erika Hancock (Frankfort)	Democratic	January 1, 2025 – present	Elected in 2024. Reelected in 2026.	2023–present
