= Odd Fellows Temple (Frankfort, Kentucky) =

- U.S. Historic district – Contributing property
- Location: 315 Saint Clair Street, Frankfort, Kentucky
- Built: 1871-72
- Part of: Frankfort Commercial Historic District (ID79000986)
- Designated CP: May 10, 1979

The Odd Fellows Temple of Frankfort, Kentucky is a three-story structure built in 1871 at 315 Saint Clair Street. Historically the top floor served as the fraternal lodge of the Odd Fellows, with the remainder of the building leased for commercial purposes.

== History ==
The Odd Fellows of Kentucky was established in 1834. On March 24, 1840, the Capital Lodge of Frankfort was chartered as the 6th lodge in Kentucky. After meeting in several locations downtown, the Capital Lodge built a permanent home along Broadway in 1848. Following a devastating fire on November 1, 1870, that destroyed the lodge and most of a downtown commercial block between Saint Clair and Ann Streets, the lodge was rebuilt. This new lodge building was constructed on Saint Clair Street with the support of over 350 members and a special bond approved by the Kentucky Legislature.

The former lodge stands as one of the largest and earliest extant IOOF lodges in the Kentucky. Completed on Jan 1, 1872, the building was dedicated on January 30, 1872, and served the local chapter for 110 years until funding necessitated its sale in 1982.

The building was listed on the National Register of Historic Places in 1979 as a contributing building in the Frankfort Commercial Historic District. Its NRHP nomination document terms this building as Oddfellows Lodge.

In 2017 the former IOOF lodge is known as "Market Square" and is a mixture of 18 residential apartments and first floor commercial space.

== See also ==
- Singing Bridge: also a contributing building to the historic district
- National Register of Historic Places listings in Franklin County, Kentucky
