= Singing Bridge =

Bridge over Kentucky River in Frankfort, KY

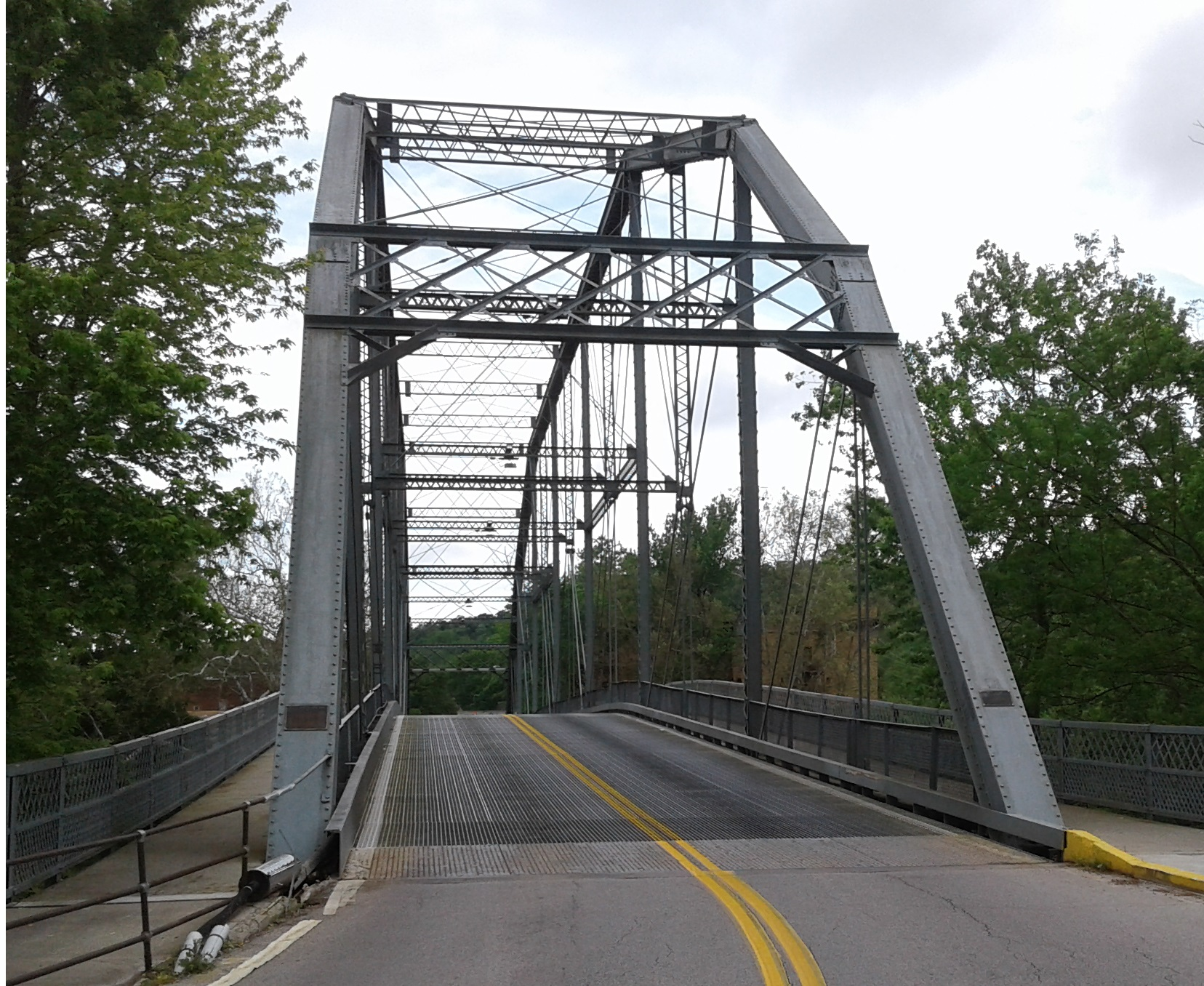
- Singing Bridge (2020)
- Coordinates: 38.1965°N 84.8788°W
- Carries: 2 vehicle lanes & 2 pedestrian walkways
- Crosses: Kentucky River
- Locale: Frankfort, Kentucky
- Begins: St. Clair Street
- Ends: Bridge Street

Characteristics
- Design: Pennsylvania truss
- Total length: 409.1 feet (124.7 m)
- Width: 24 feet (7.3 m)
- Load limit: 3 tons
- Clearance above: 20 feet (6.1 m)

History
- Constructed by: King Bridge Company
- Opened: 1893
- Closed: 2024

Statistics
- Daily traffic: 5,000 (2019)

The Singing Bridge (also known as the St. Clair Street bridge) is a two-lane vehicle and pedestrian bridge in Frankfort, Kentucky that is so named because of the humming sound it makes when driven over. As of 2019, the bridge carries over 5,000 vehicles per day across the Kentucky River along St. Clair Street to Bridge Street, joining Downtown Frankfort with South Frankfort. It is a contributing structure to the Frankfort Commercial Historic District on the National Register of Historic Places.

The bridge gets its name from the humming noise it makes as vehicles travel across its open-grate steel deck, which replaced a solid flooring in 1937.

== History ==
The over-400 foot long bridge is a Pennsylvania truss bridge built in 1893 by King Bridge Company, and was rehabilitated in 1956 and in 2010. The bridge originally carried U.S. Route 60 (US 60) until that highway was rerouted over the nearby War Mothers Memorial Bridge.

In 1894 and 1909, two African-American men were lynched at the Singing Bridge. In 2022, the city of Frankfort issued an official apology to the families of the two men, and erected a historic marker at the site.

In 2019, the 125-year-old bridge's load rating was reduced from 9 tons (1988) to 3 tons, then it was closed to vehicle traffic in late 2020 when an accident caused damage to a truss and rail. Repairs were started in March 2021 to repair the damage and to inspect for further damage caused when an unmoored floating marina's roof hit the bottom of the bridge on March 3, 2021, during high river levels.

In 2024, the Kentucky Transportation Cabinet closed the Singing Bridge to all traffic as a result of structural safety concerns after a routine inspection. The bridge is not expected to re-open, with structural assessments performed after its closure determining that the bridge is unsafe for all traffic (even pedestrian), that repairs are infeasible, and that the steel is too deteriorated for continued maintenance. As of April 2025, the Kentucky Transportation Cabinet has decided to demolish and replace the bridge.

== Gallery ==
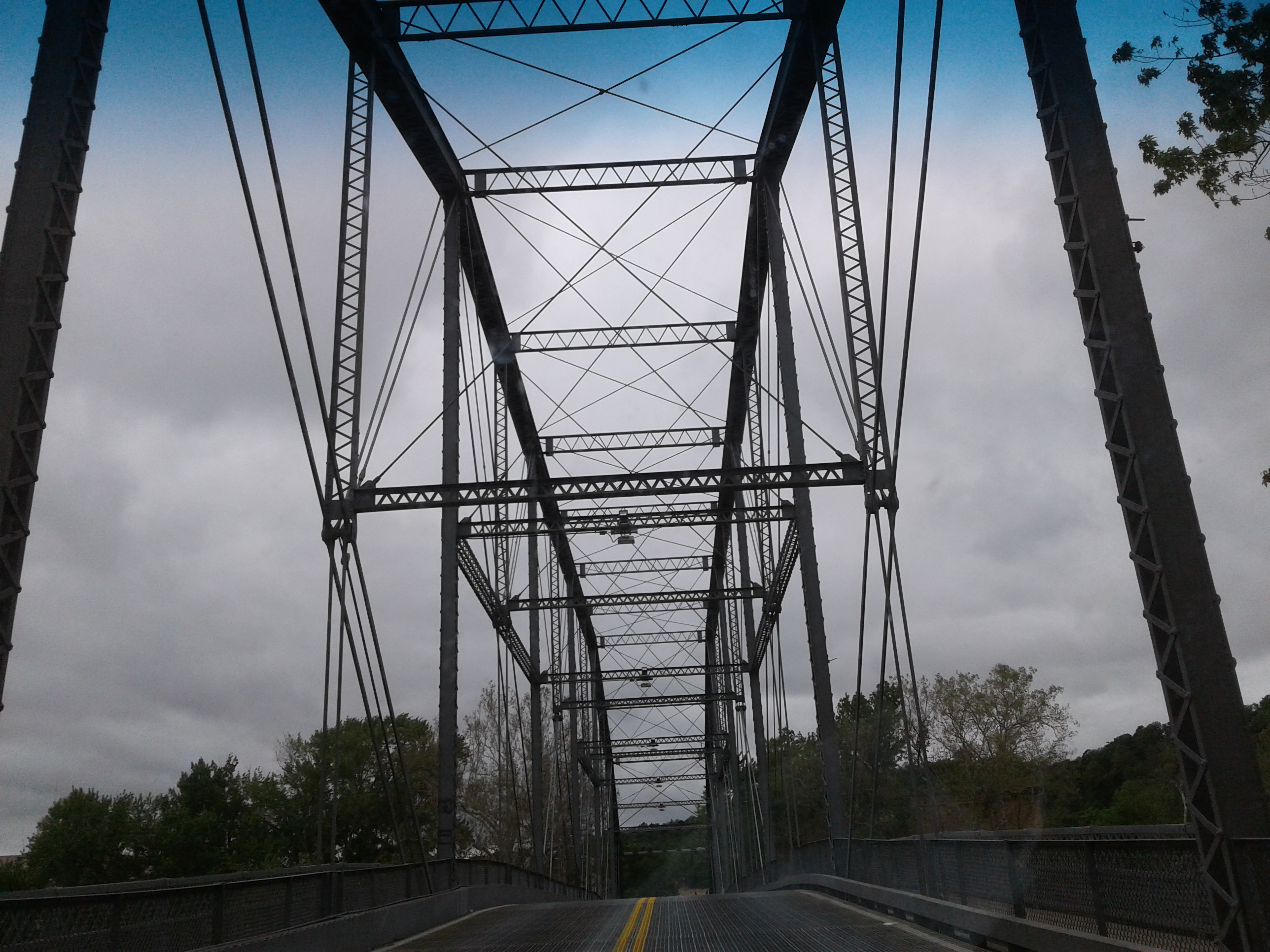
View from on the bridge

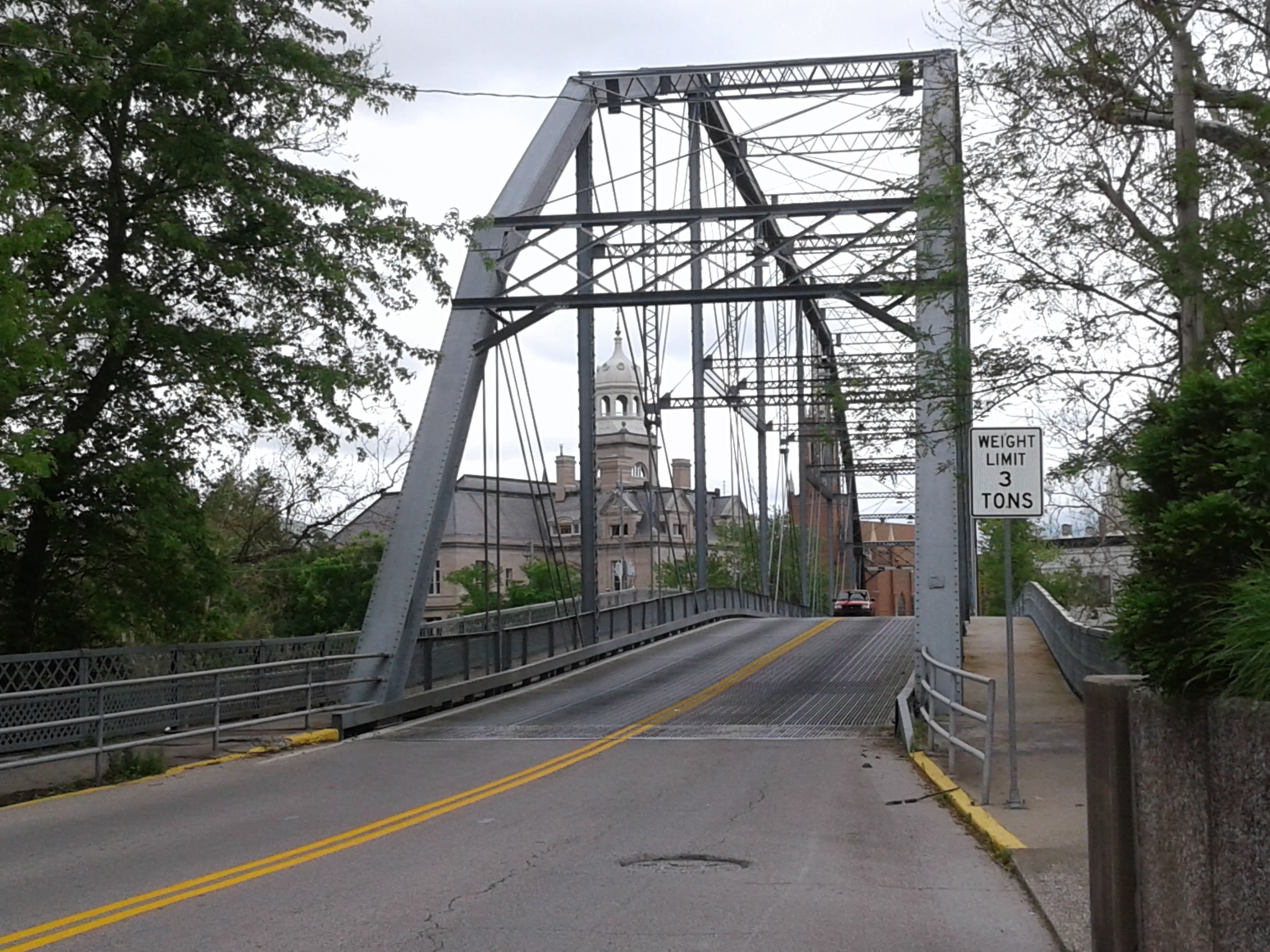
View from Bridge Street

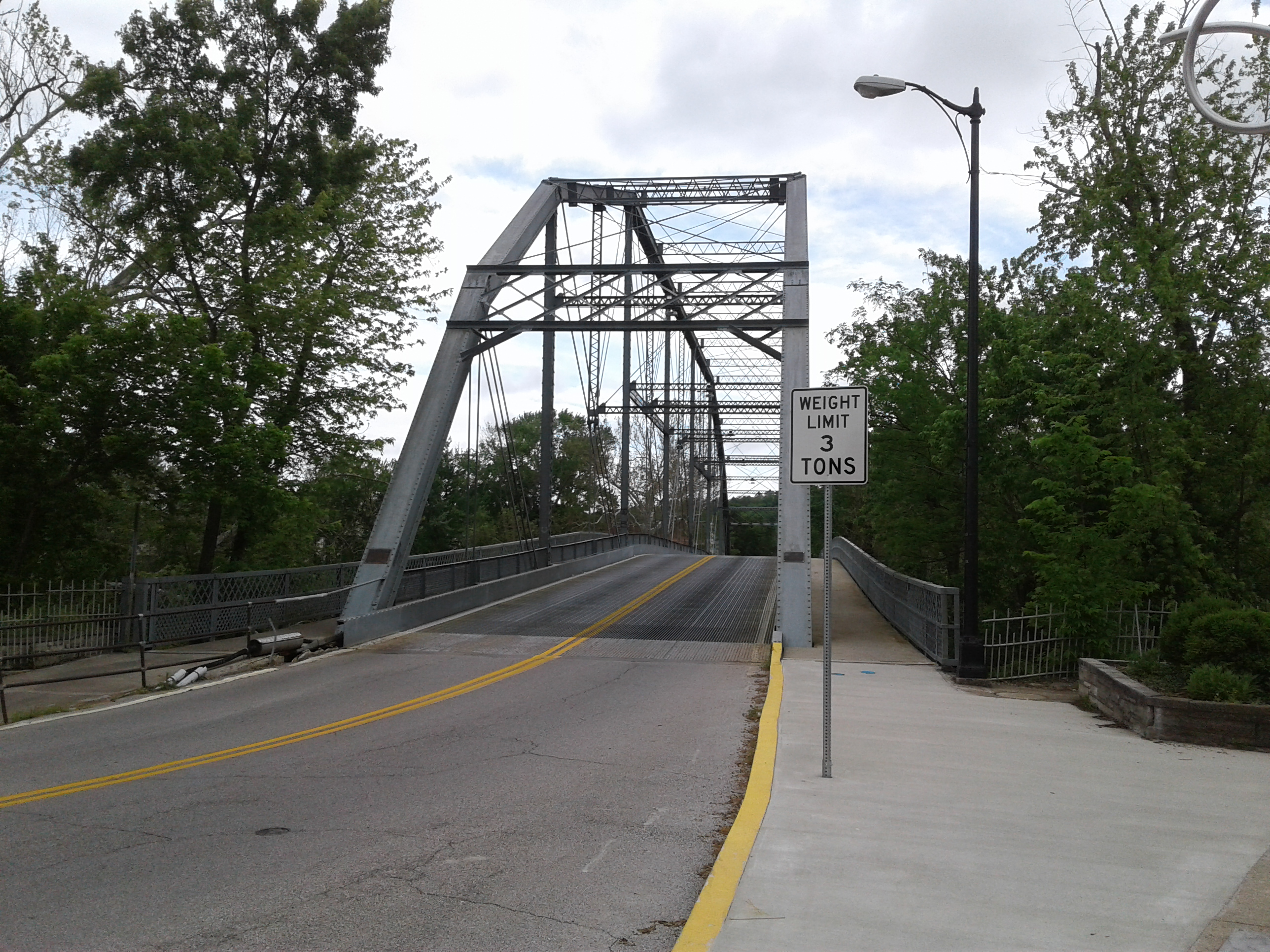
View from St. Clair Street

== See also ==
- Odd Fellows Temple: also a contributing building to the historic district
- National Register of Historic Places listings in Franklin County, Kentucky
