= Beeches (Frankfort, Kentucky) =

Historic house in Kentucky, United States

- U.S. National Register of Historic Places
- Location within Kentucky Location within the United States
- Location: Off U.S. 421, Frankfort, Kentucky
- Coordinates: 38°12′46″N 84°52′1″W
- Area: 6 acres (2.4 ha)
- Built: c.1800, 1818
- Architectural style: Federal
- NRHP reference No.: 79000985
- Added to NRHP: February 9, 1979

Beeches is a brick house in Frankfort, Kentucky whose main block was built in 1818. In 1979, when it was listed on the National Register of Historic Places, it was in a great lawn in a park-like setting, in contrast to 20th century encroachments on all sides.

It was deemed notable as an outstanding Federal-style structure and as one of just two surviving nineteenth-century buildings along the Leestown Pike in Franklin County, Kentucky. The other building, Glen Willis, one-fourth mile to the southwest, was already listed on the National Register.

It has a one-and-a-half-story section that was a c.1800 brick house, and a two-and-a-half-story main block, also in brick. It has later brick and frame additions to the rear and east side.
