= Erika Hancock =

Kentucky politician

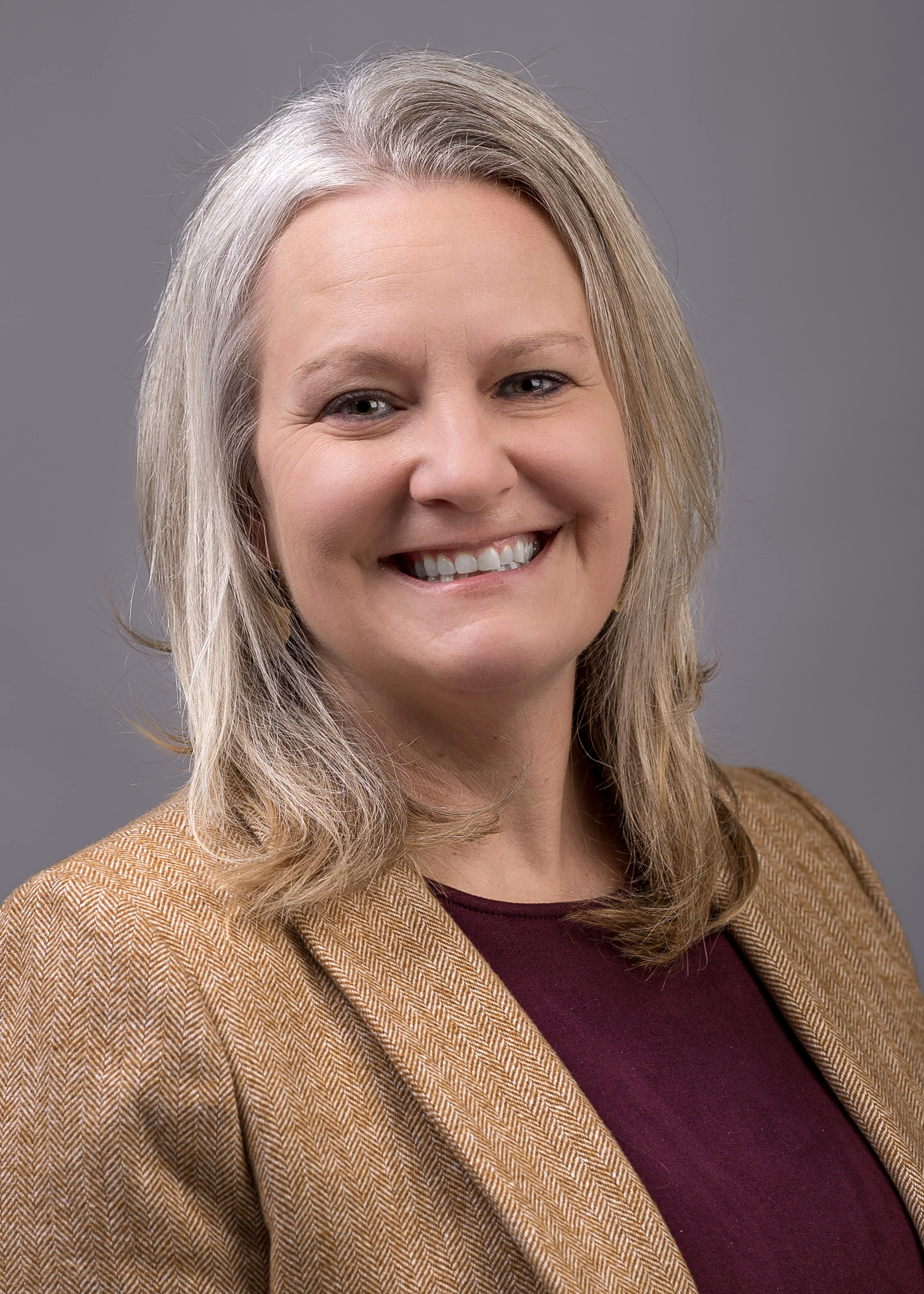

Member of the Kentucky House of Representatives from the 57th district
- Incumbent
- Assumed office January 1, 2025
- Preceded by: Derrick Graham

Personal details
- Born: July 16, 1978 (age 48)
- Party: Democratic

Erika Marie Hancock (born July 16, 1978) is an American politician who is a member of the Kentucky House of Representatives. Her term began in January 2025. She represents the 57th district, which comprises part of Franklin County.

== Political career ==
Hancock was elected in the 2024 Kentucky House of Representatives election following the retirement of incumbent representative Derrick Graham. She defeated Kristie Powe in the May primary election, and Republican candidate Kyle T. Thompson in the general election with 54.4 percent of the vote.

== Electoral history ==
=== 2024 ===
Democratic primary results
Party	Candidate	Votes	%
Democratic	Erika Marie Hancock	4,467	67.3
Democratic	Kristie Powe	2,168	32.7
Total votes		6,635	100.0

2024 Kentucky House of Representatives 57th district election
Party	Candidate	Votes	%
Democratic	Erika Marie Hancock	11,342	55.4
Republican	Kyle T. Thompson	9,127	44.6
Total votes		20,469	100.0
Democratic hold			

Kentucky House of Representatives
Preceded by Derrick Graham	Member of the Kentucky House of Representatives from the 57th district 2025–present	Succeeded by incumbent
