= Polsgrove, Kentucky =

Unincorporated community in Kentucky, United States

- Unincorporated community
- Location within the state of Kentucky Polsgrove (the United States)
- Coordinates: 38°20′53″N 84°53′6″W
- Country: United States
- State: Kentucky
- County: Franklin
- Elevation: 466 ft (142 m)
- Time zone: UTC-5 (Eastern (EST))
  - Summer (DST): UTC-4 (EDT)
- GNIS feature ID: 508846

Polsgrove is an unincorporated community within Franklin County, Kentucky, United States. Its post office is closed.
