= Elkhorn Creek (Kentucky) =

Coordinates: 38.3175704°N 84.8555053°W

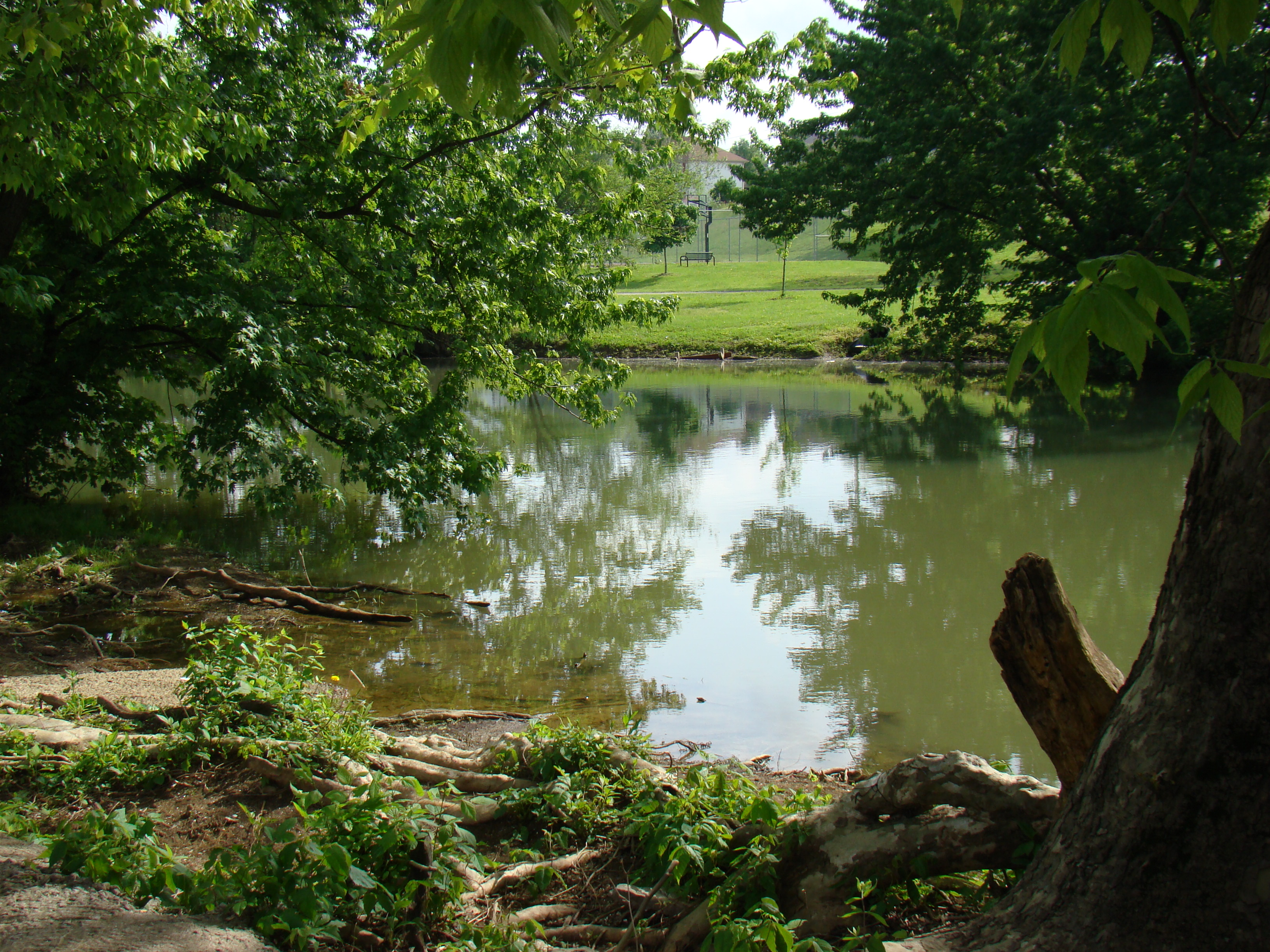
- North Elkhorn Creek in Georgetown, Kentucky.

Physical characteristics
- Source
  - location: Confluence of North and South forks in Franklin County
  - elevation: 650 ft (200 m)
- Mouth
  - location: Kentucky River in Franklin County
  - elevation: 456 ft (139 m)
- Basin size: 499.5 mi^{2} (1,294 km^{2})
- Discharge
  - location: Frankfort, Kentucky
  - average: 677 cu/ft. per sec.
- Discharge
  - location: South Fork Elkhorn Creek near Midway
  - average: 187 cu/ft. per sec.

Elkhorn Creek is an 99-mile-long (159 km) stream running through several counties in central Kentucky in the United States. The stream drains an area of 499.5 square miles (1,294 km^{2}). It derives its name from the shape, as seen on a map, of its main stem with its two primary forks.

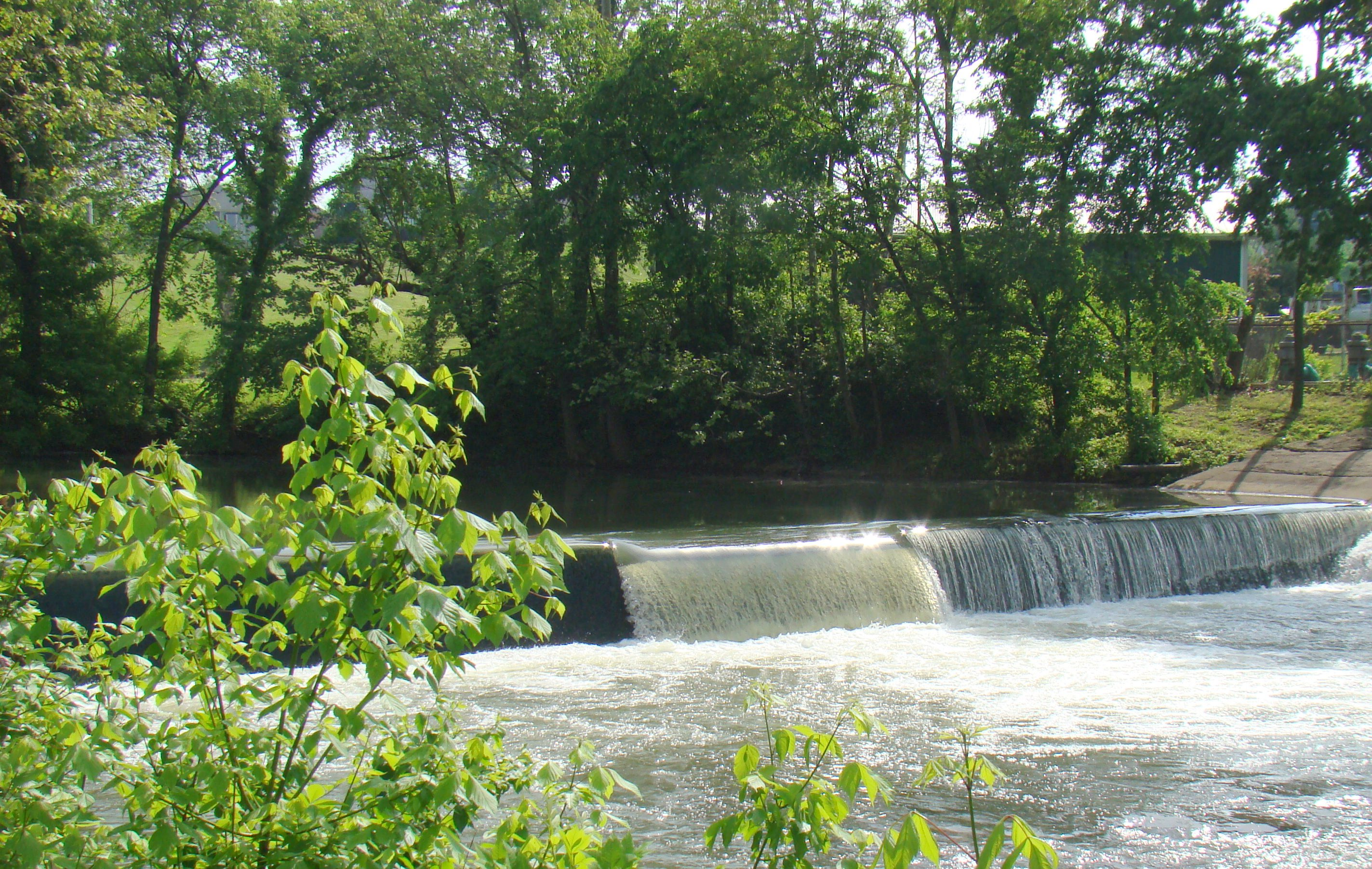
Wallace Dam on North Elkhorn Creek in Scott County.

North Elkhorn Creek starts just east of Lexington and flows 75.4 miles (121.3 km) through Fayette and Scott counties, and into Franklin County, where it meets the South Elkhorn at the Forks of the Elkhorn east of Frankfort.

South Elkhorn Creek begins in Fayette County, and flows 52.8 miles (85.0 km) through Woodford, Scott, and Franklin counties to reach the Forks of the Elkhorn. South Elkhorn Creek defines the boundary between Scott and Woodford counties. Beyond the Forks of the Elkhorn, the confluent waters flow north and empty into the Kentucky River north of Frankfort.

Species of fish in the Elkhorn include catfish, rock bass, smallmouth bass, largemouth bass, carp, crappie, and bluegill. Smallmouth bass is the featured fish of the Elkhorn, as the Elkhorn has been known to have a healthy population of this species.

Fishing tips can be accessed from the Kentucky Department of Fish and Wildlife Resources website.

Elkhorn is popular for being a kayaking/canoeing spot for many outdoor adventurers. Elkhorn is a popular destination for not only Kentuckians, but also many visitors from out of state.

Elkhorn Creek is mentioned in the poem "Song of Myself" by Walt Whitman:

A Southerner soon as a Northerner, a planter nonchalant and hospitable down by the Oconee I live,
A Yankee bound my own way ready for trade, my joints the limberest joints on earth and the sternest joints on earth,
A Kentuckian walking the vale of the Elkhorn in my deer-skin leggings, a Louisianian or Georgian …

== History ==
=== Distillation on the Elkhorn Creek ===
James Stone's Elkhorn Distillery was one of the many distilleries that opened up in Kentucky following the end of the Civil War. The Elkhorn distillery was located on the southern branch of the Elkhorn Creek located just outside of Lexington, Kentucky in Scott County. The distillery was located on Elkhorn Creek in order to extract water from it to create steam to power all of the machines involved in the distillation process. James Stone's Elkhorn distillery was the largest producer of Bourbon in the late 1800s but was only in operation for a handful of years. James Stone and his distillery are extremely well documented from personal letters, business documents, and other written accounts of the daily operation of the Elkhorn Distillery. Today, the original distillation building is gone but the storage warehouse is still intact and can be visited.

=== Environmental damage ===
Damage to the Elkhorn Creek has been caused by industrial incidents on a few occasions, most notably in 1908, 1934, and 1999. In 1908, The Greenbaum Distillery caught on fire and the burned whiskey was dumped into the Elkhorn creek causing thousands of fish to die. Similarly, in 1934 the Pepper Distillery caught on fire and dumped whiskey into the creek also causing the death of many fish species. Much later in 1999, a paint-factory fire released deadly chemicals into Elkhorn Creek which also lead to the death of native species.

=== Legends ===
The name of Elkhorn Creek is largely unknown but the Native American legend of Chin-gash-goochy has an explanation for the unusual name. The story follows Chin-gash-goochy, a young Native American man who falls madly in love with a fellow Native American woman named Ne-me-no-che-char. Ne-me-no-char was betrothed to Chin-gash-goochy's father but their love was too strong so they decided to flee to the distant land of what is now Kentucky to start a new life. The lovers left on the back of an Elk named Wapita who would bring them all the way to the new land. Chin-gash-goochy's father caught up with the two runaways and shot his last arrow at them striking Wapita in the heart. While Wapita was slowly dying, he protected the lovers by forming a barricade with his massive antlers between them and their enemy so he could not pass. The lovers started their new life behind the barricade and over time, Wapita's antlers sunk deeper and deeper into the soil and eventually dug out the first crevices that would create the Elkhorn Creek.

== See also ==
- List of rivers of Kentucky
