= Hank Hancock =

American politician (1936–2024)

Speaker pro tempore of the Kentucky House of Representatives
- In office January 8, 1980 – January 5, 1982
- Preceded by: Lloyd E. Clapp
- Succeeded by: David Thomason

Member of the Kentucky House of Representatives from the 57th district
- In office January 1, 1974 – January 1, 1995
- Preceded by: Kenneth Wood
- Succeeded by: Gippy Graham

Personal details
- Born: March 3, 1936 Frankfort, Kentucky, U.S.
- Died: February 16, 2024 (aged 87)
- Party: Democratic

Charles McGrath "Hank" Hancock (March 3, 1936 – February 16, 2024) was an American politician in the state of Kentucky. He served in the Kentucky House of Representatives from 1974 to 1995. He was a Democrat. Hancock was first elected to the house in 1973, defeating Democratic incumbent Kenneth Wood for renomination. He did not seek reelection in 1994.

Hancock died on February 16, 2024, at the age of 87.
