= Confederate Monument in Frankfort =

- U.S. National Register of Historic Places
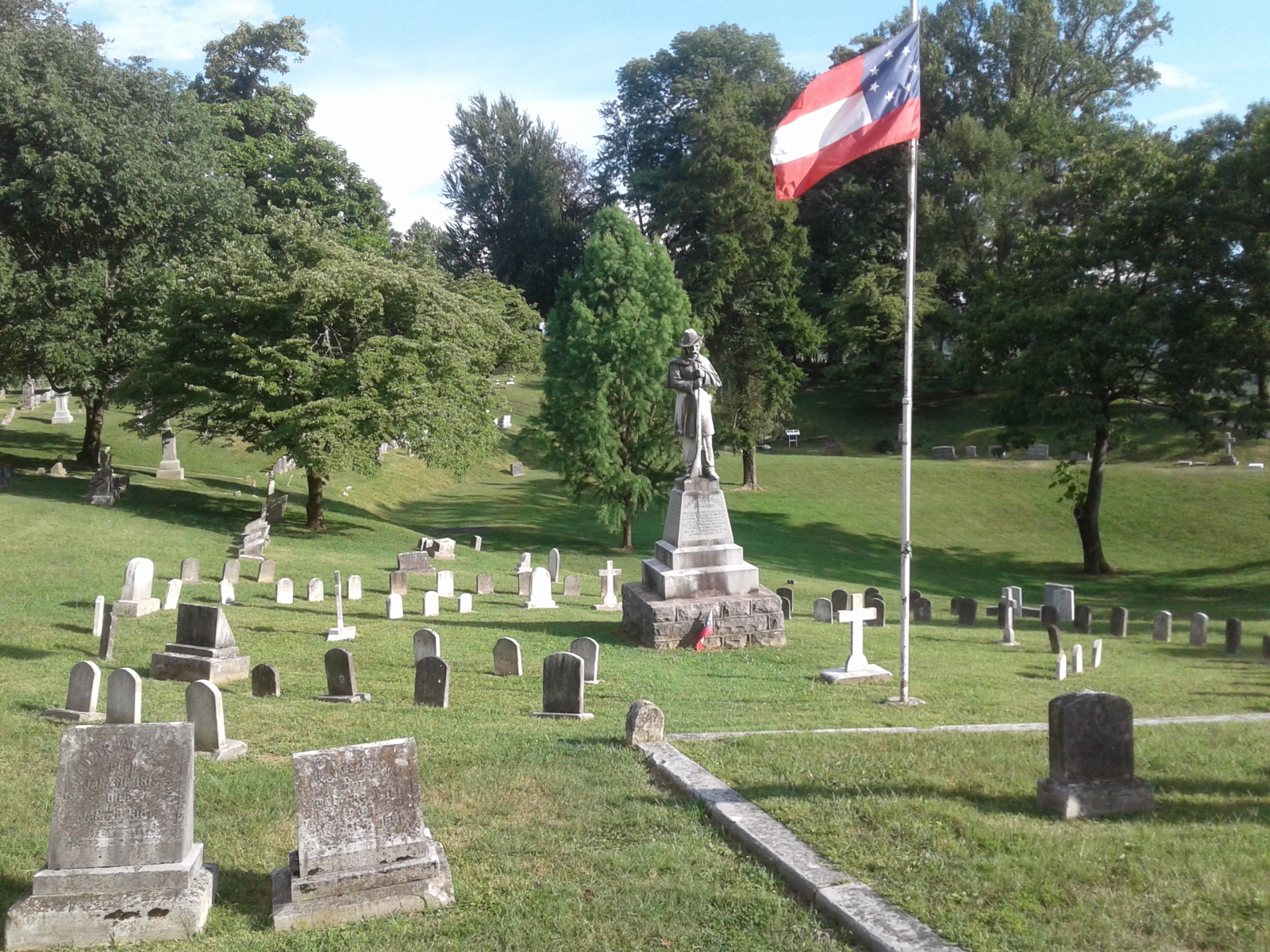
- Photo taken in 2020

- Location within Kentucky Location within the United States
- Location: Frankfort, Kentucky
- Built: 1892
- MPS: Civil War Monuments of Kentucky MPS
- NRHP reference No.: 97000702
- Added to NRHP: July 17, 1997

The Confederate Monument in Frankfort is placed within a circle of the graves of 68 Confederate soldiers in Frankfort Cemetery in Kentucky. The statue depicts a life size Confederate soldier standing ready, carved from white Carrara marble and standing atop a granite pedestal on a limestone base. A flagpole displays the first flag of the Confederacy with seven stars. The monument was erected by Daughters of the Confederacy and unveiled in 1892.

In 1997, the monument was placed on the National Register of Historic Places as one of 60 Civil War monuments in Kentucky. Frankfort has one other, the Colored Soldiers Monument which is located in Green Hill Cemetery.

== Inscriptions ==
The granite pedestal has an inscription on each of its four sides; the fourth being part of the last stanza of the Bivouac of the Dead, written by Theodore O'Hara, who is also buried in Frankfort Cemetery.

Face:

Our Confederate Dead
1861–1865
They sleep—what need to question now
if they were right or wrong?
They know, ere this, whose cause was
just in God the Father's sight.
They wield no warlike weapons now
return no foeman's thrust;
Who but a coward would revile
an honored soldier's dust.

West side:

This marble minstrels voiceful stone
in deathless songs shall tell
When many a vanished age hath flown,
the story how ye fell.
Nor wreck, nor change, nor winter's blight,
Nor time's remorseless doom,
shall dim one ray of holy light
that gilds your glorious tomb.

Reverse:

Greater love hath no man than
this, that a man lay down his
life for his friends.

East side:

To every man upon this earth
death cometh soon or late,
and how can man die better
than facing fearful odds
for the ashes of his fathers
and the temples of his gods?

== Gallery ==
Photos of the Confederate Monument in Frankfort
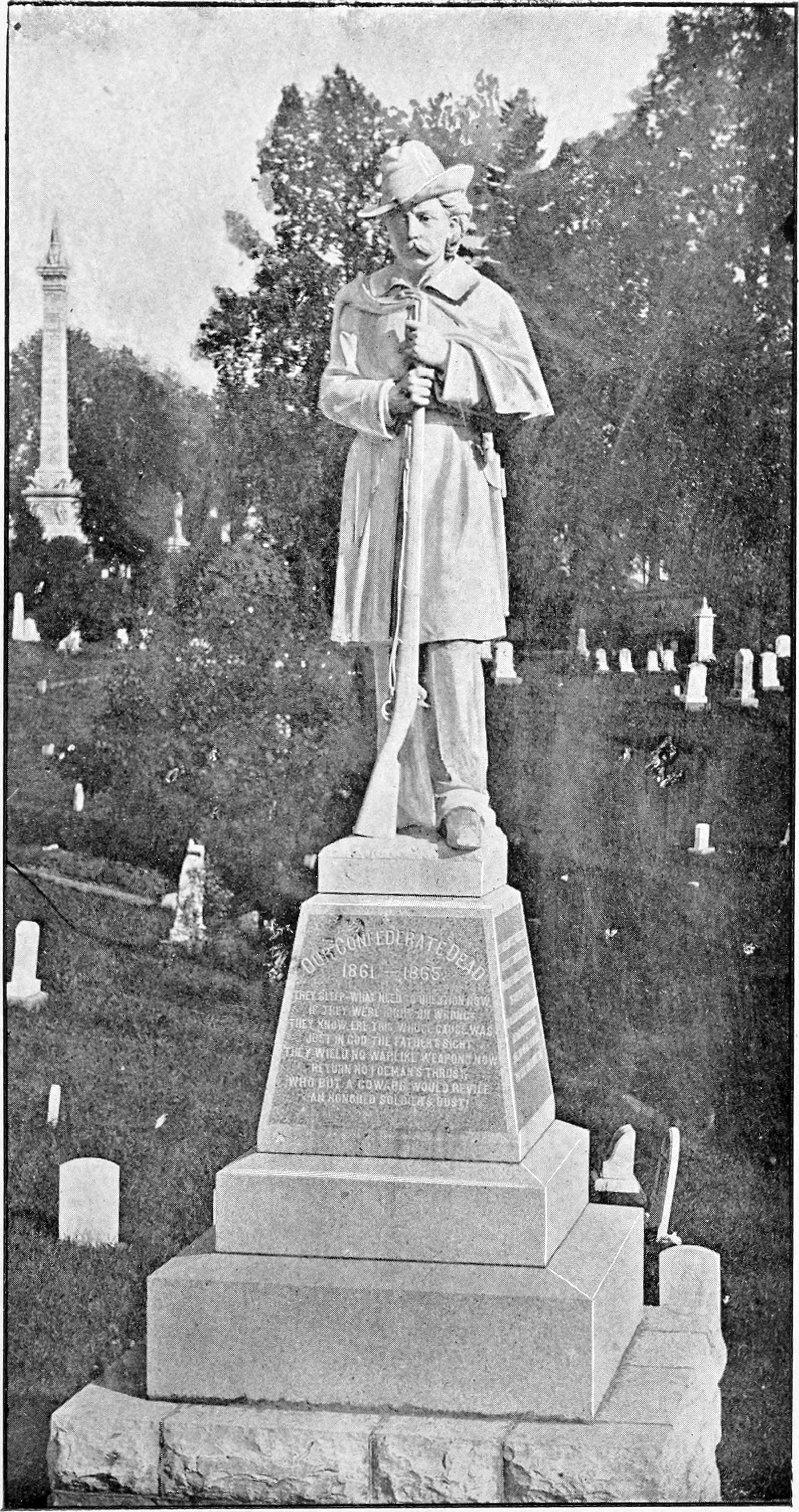
Photo published in 1898

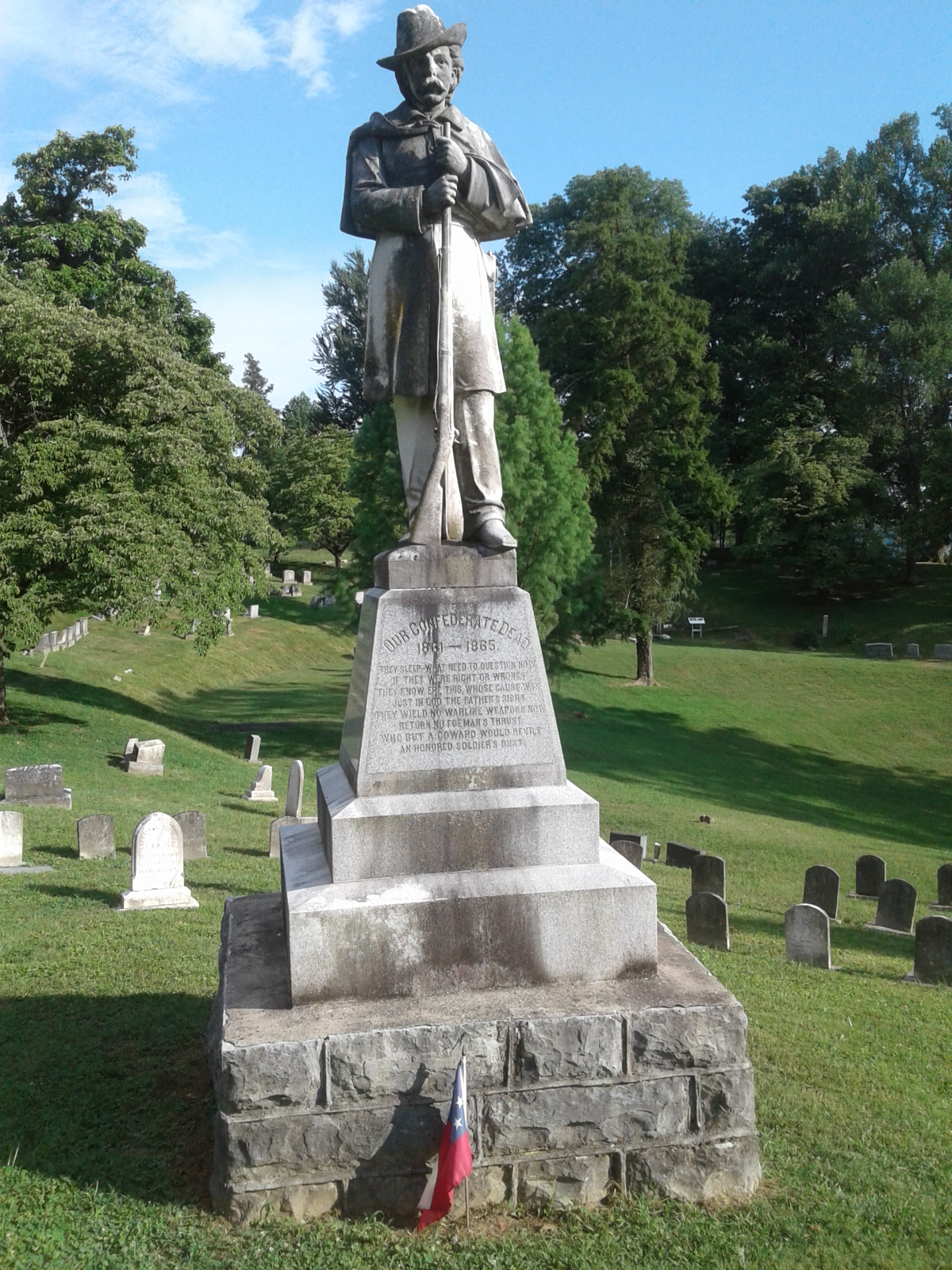
Photo taken in 2020

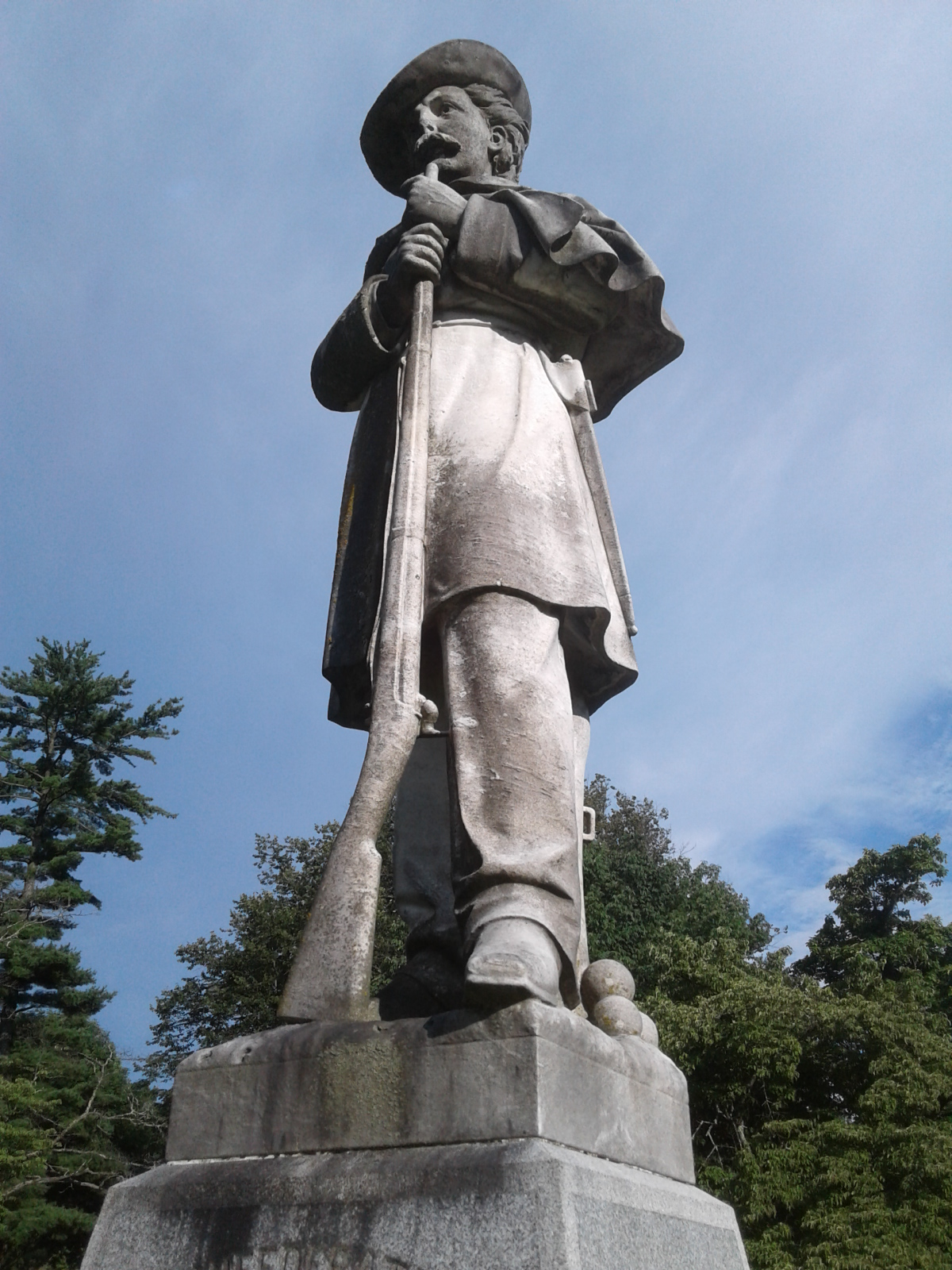
The statue

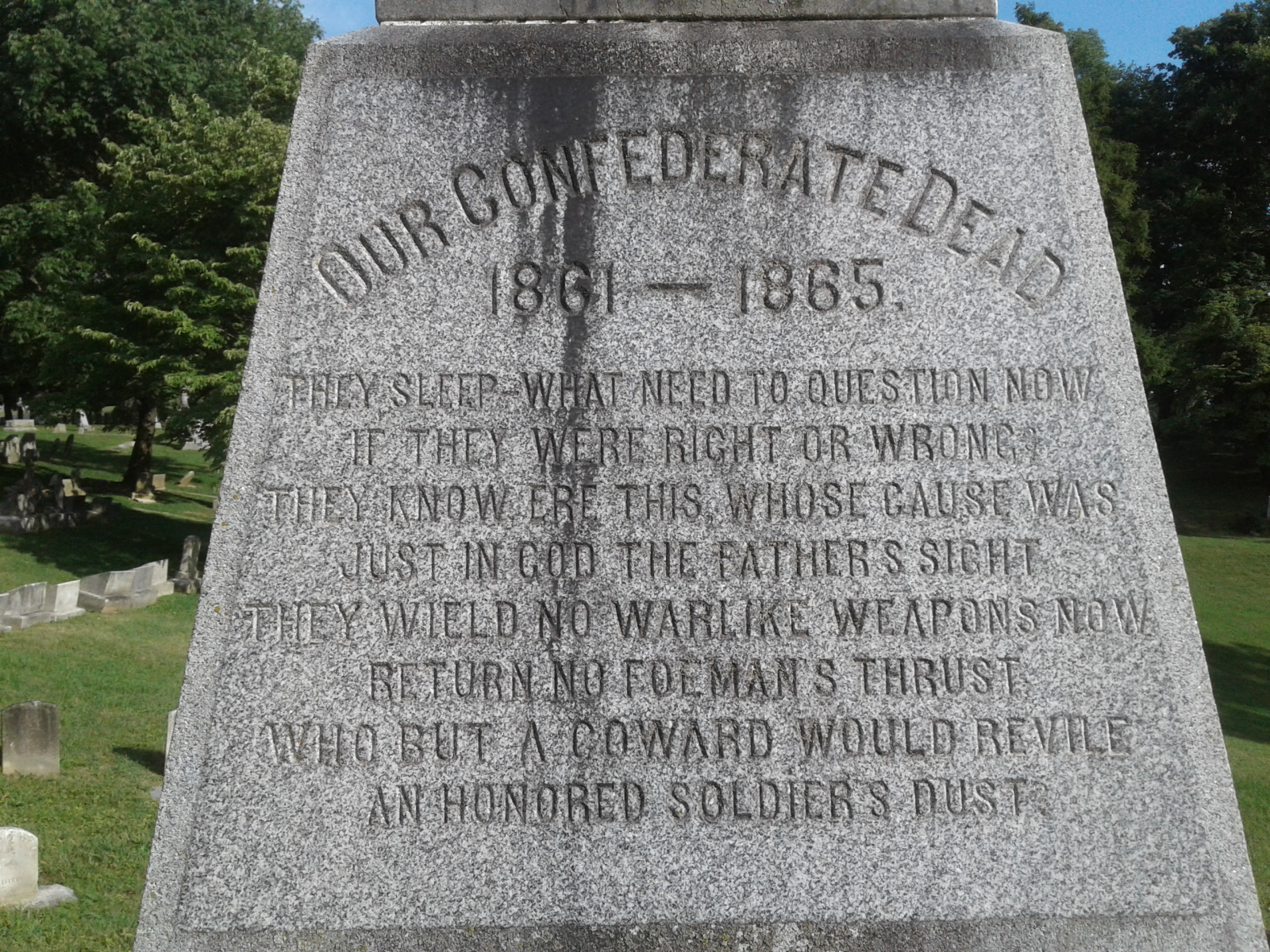
Inscription on face
