= Bridgeport, Kentucky =

Unincorporated community in Kentucky, United States

- Unincorporated community
- Location within the state of Kentucky Bridgeport (the United States)
- Coordinates: 38°9′36″N 84°57′4″W
- Country: United States
- State: Kentucky
- County: Franklin
- Elevation: 702 ft (214 m)
- Time zone: UTC-5 (Eastern (EST))
  - Summer (DST): UTC-4 (EDT)
- GNIS feature ID: 487891

Bridgeport is an unincorporated community in western Franklin County, Kentucky, United States, along on U.S. Route 60 outside of Frankfort. It is part of the Frankfort Micropolitan Statistical Area. An elementary school, Bridgeport Elementary, was the focal point of the community for many years. The school has since been replaced by the new Bridgeport Elementary, located in the city limits. Several churches now hold the community together, since the Bridgeport Ruritan Club closed in 2011.

== Name ==
The name of the community is believed to have come from the two covered bridges that existed in the area, one over Armstrong's Branch and the other over South Benson Creek. Benson Creek was itself named after Richard Benson, who was a part of one of the first explorations of the region in 1774, whereas Armstrong Branch was named after one of the first nearby landowners, William Armstrong, who purchased his 300 acres of land in 1784. Neither covered bridge exists to this day.

== Education ==
Bridgeport was the original location of the Bridgeport Elementary School. The schoolhouse for the community was constructed in 1851 and would see further expansions through the years until it destroyed by a fire. It was replaced with the current building in 1942 and was at the time designed to service both elementary and high school students—on the first and second floors, respectively. The building was closed in 2005 and Bridgeport Elementary was moved to its current location within Frankfort next to both the local middle and high schools. The old school building now serves as an apartment complex.

The Bridgeport School, at 555 Bridgeport Rd., was listed on the National Register of Historic Places in 2014.
