= Forks of Elkhorn, Kentucky =

Unincorporated community in Kentucky, United States

- Unincorporated community
- Nickname: The Forks
- Location within the state of Kentucky Forks of Elkhorn (the United States)
- Coordinates: 38°12′56″N 84°47′52″W
- Country: United States
- State: Kentucky
- County: Franklin
- Elevation: 656 ft (200 m)
- Time zone: UTC-5 (Eastern (EST))
  - Summer (DST): UTC-4 (EDT)
- ZIP codes: 40321
- Area code: 502
- GNIS feature ID: 492345

Forks of Elkhorn is an unincorporated community within Franklin County, Kentucky, United States. It lies on US 460 where the north and south forks of Elkhorn Creek meet. It is believed to have been established in 1784. The town had a post office from 1848 to September 24, 1965. The town had a station on the Frankfort and Cincinnati Railroad that was known as Elsinore for unknown reasons.
