= Colored Soldiers Monument in Frankfort =

- U.S. National Register of Historic Places
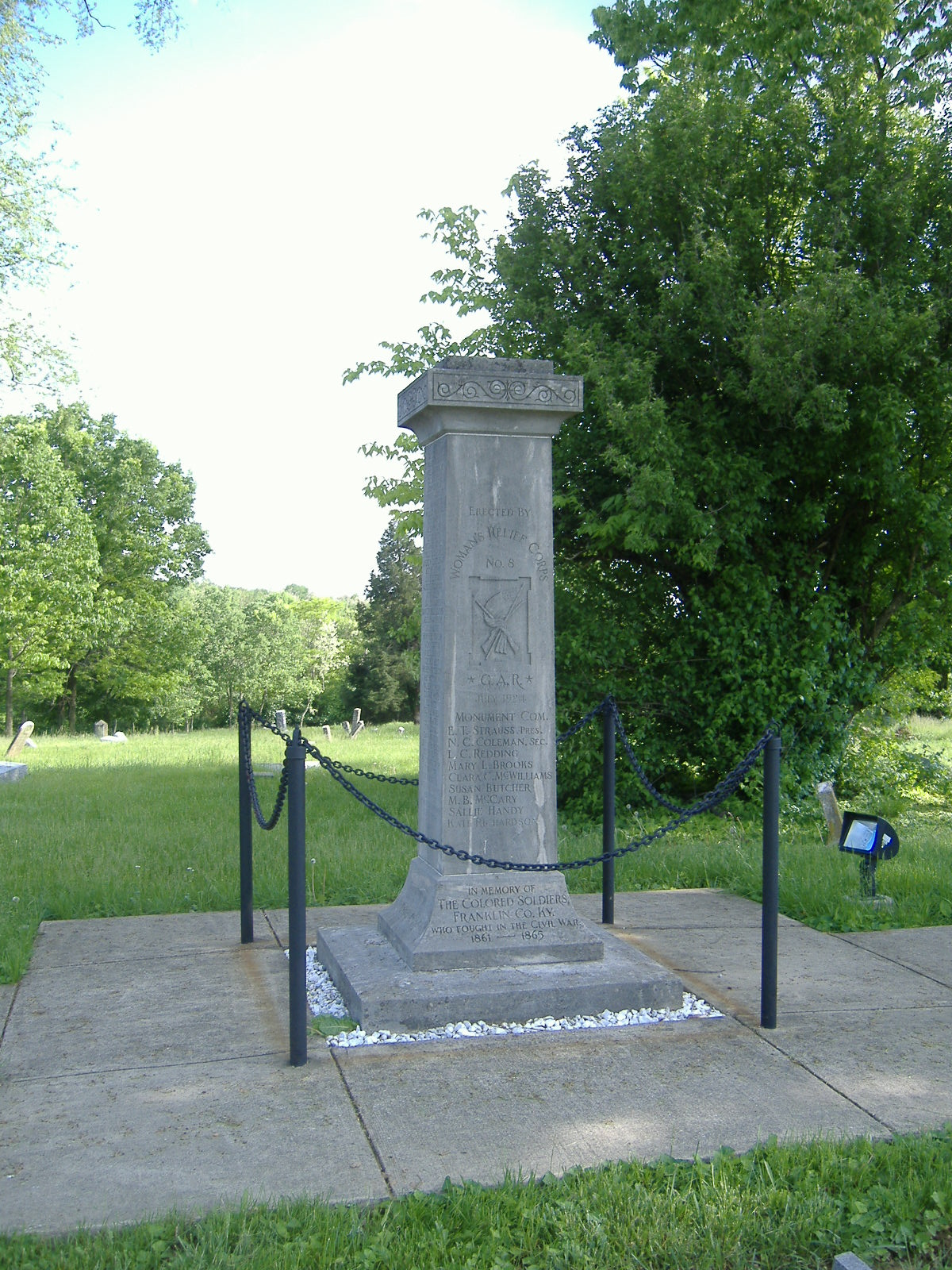

- Location within Kentucky Location within the United States
- Location: Frankfort, Kentucky
- Built: 1924
- MPS: Civil War Monuments of Kentucky MPS
- NRHP reference No.: 97000701
- Added to NRHP: July 17, 1997

The Colored Soldiers Monument in Frankfort, Kentucky's Green Hill Cemetery, at the junction of US 60 and US 421, is the only Kentucky monument honoring black soldiers that participated in the American Civil War, and one of only four in the entire United States. Erected by the Woman's Relief Corps No. 8, an auxiliary of the Grand Army of the Republic, it was unveiled on July 4, 1924. The only other monument built by GAR in Kentucky is the GAR Monument in Covington.

== History ==
Due to state laws, Kentucky was not allowed to recruit blacks until March 1, 1864. In total, 23,703 blacks from Kentucky would join a total of 23 Union regiments. This would provide the Union Army one-third of its total forces from the state of Kentucky. Those that enlisted were immediately emancipated. Although generally given garrison duty, these soldiers did see combat action, mostly in Tennessee and North Carolina. After the war ended, some were sent west to Texas to discourage France from conquering Mexico. Only the state of Louisiana provided more black troops than Kentucky.

The monument, built in 1924, is a simple 10-foot tall 4-sided limestone pillar. Its base is of poured concrete. The front bears the inscription "In Memory of the Colored Soldiers Franklin County, Kentucky Who Fought in the Civil War 1861-1865." Inscribed around the column are the names of 142 black soldiers that hailed from central Kentucky. All that is known of its cost is that it was "several hundred dollars". It was dedicated at 4 p.m. on July 4, 1924.

On July 17, 1997, the Colored Soldiers Monument in Frankfort was one of 60 different monuments related to the Civil War in Kentucky placed on the National Register of Historic Places, as part of the Civil War Monuments of Kentucky Multiple Property Submission. The Confederate Monument in Frankfort is the only other one in Frankfort; it is in Frankfort Cemetery one mile (1.6 km) to the west.

== Gallery ==
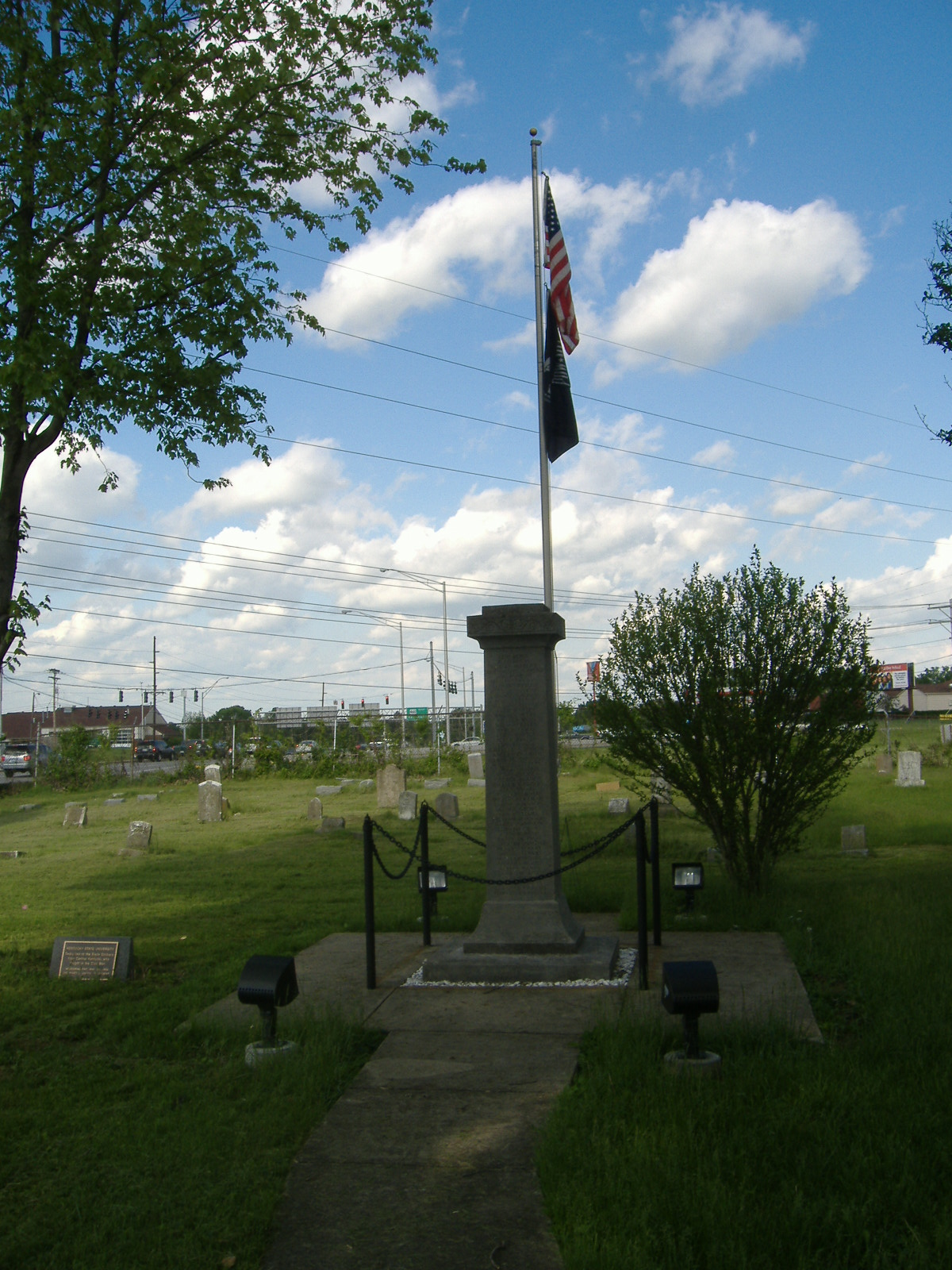
West side

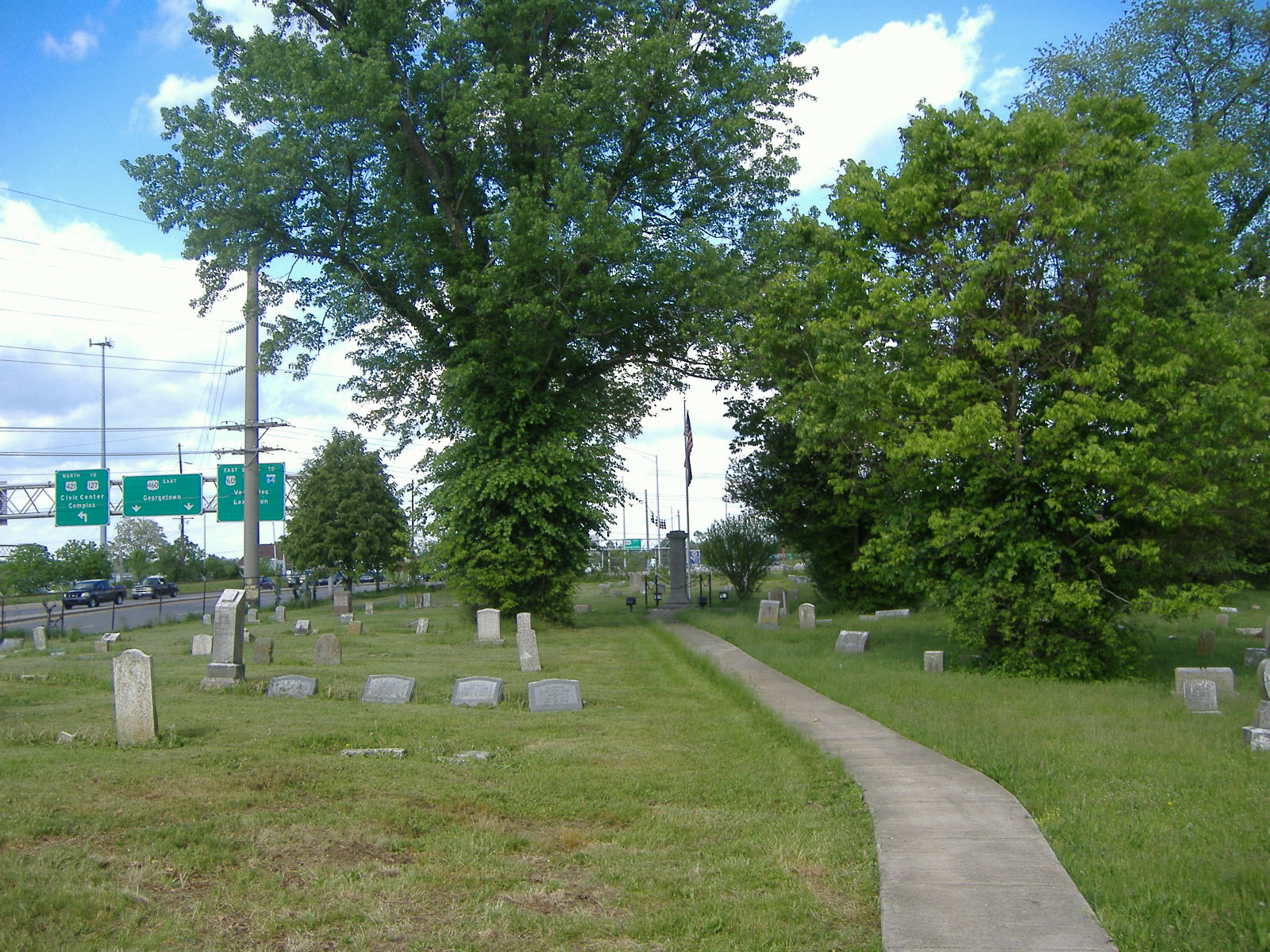
View from cemetery road

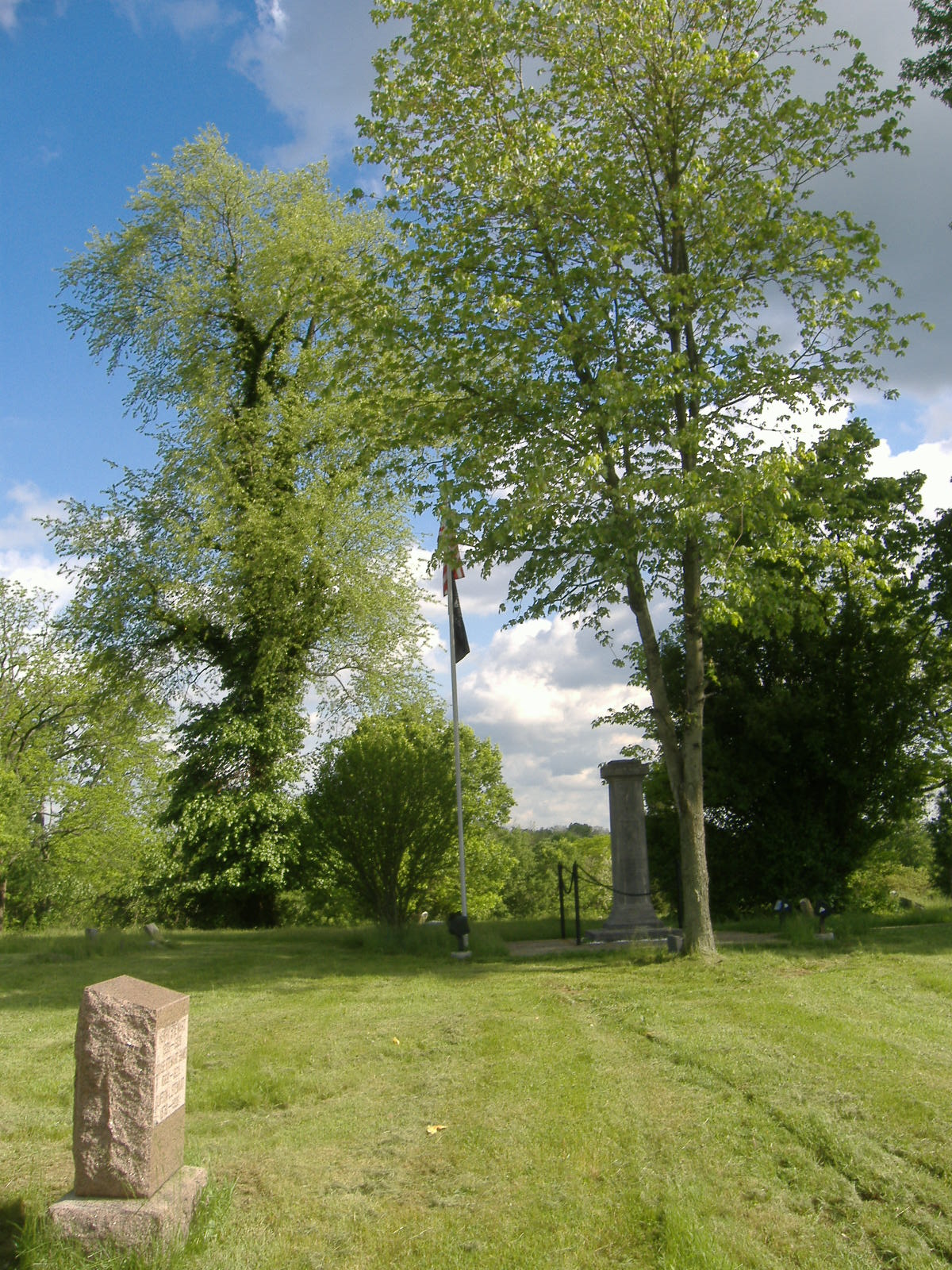
View from US-60

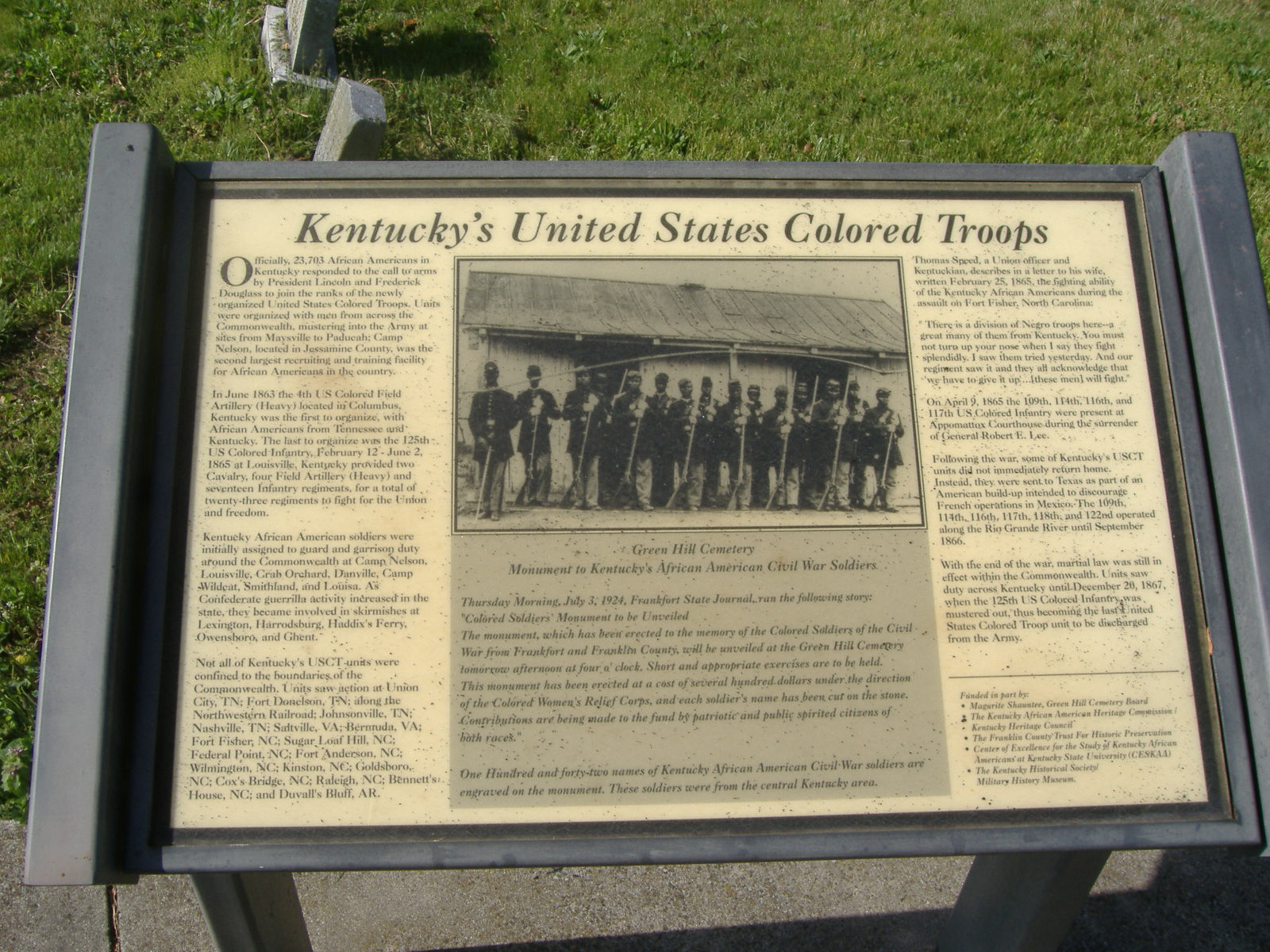
Interpretive marker describing the monument

== See also ==
- Buffalo soldiers
- Camp Nelson Civil War Heritage Park
- 5th United States Colored Cavalry Regiment
