= Glen Willis =

Historic house in Kentucky, United States

- U.S. National Register of Historic Places
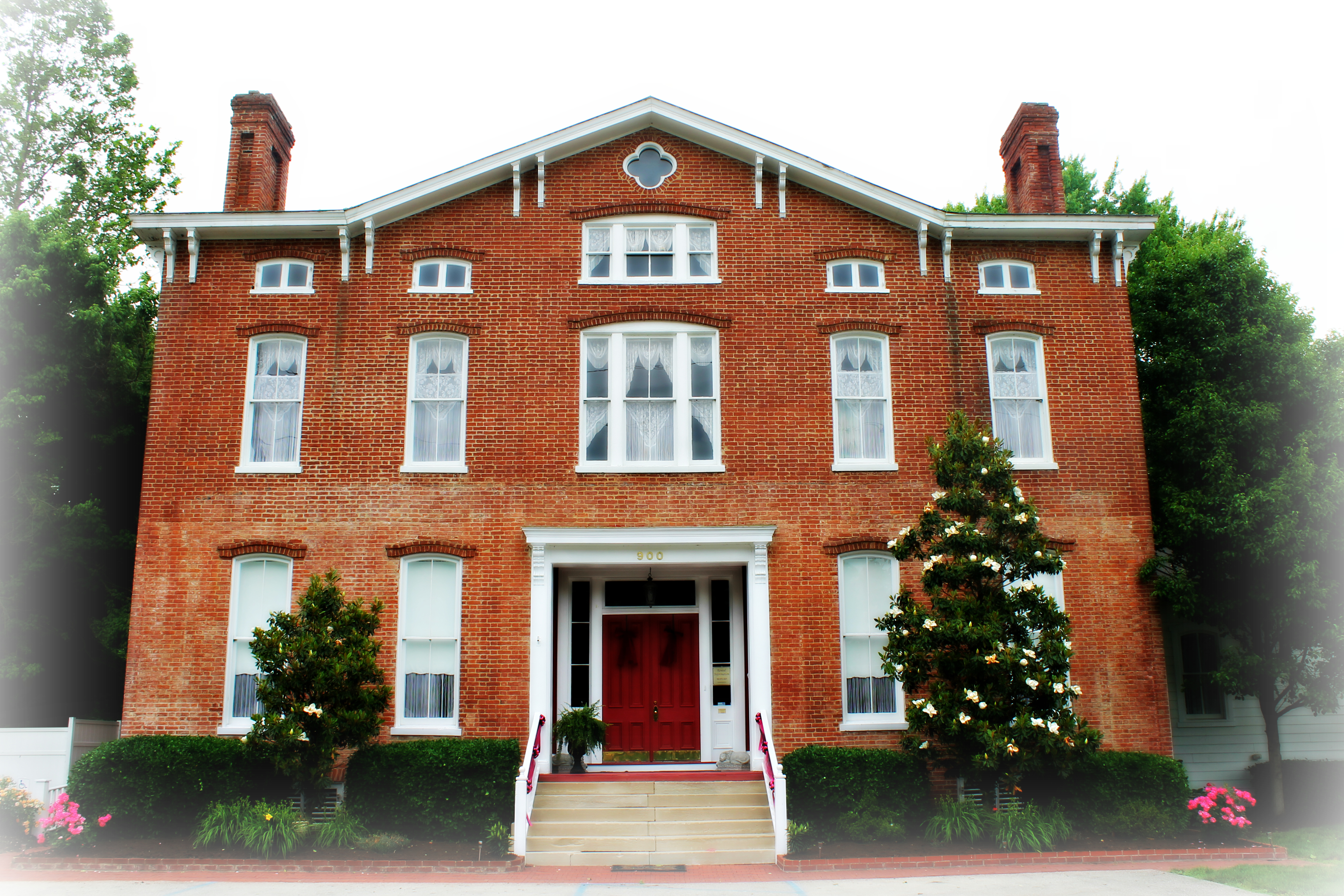

- Location within Kentucky Location within the United States
- Location: Leestown Pike, Frankfort, Kentucky
- Coordinates: 38°12′37″N 84°52′20″W
- Area: 5.5 acres (2.2 ha)
- Built: 1815
- NRHP reference No.: 72000531
- Added to NRHP: June 13, 1972

Glen Willis is a building in Frankfort, Kentucky that was built as a brick, two-story house in 1815. A third story was added when it was remodelled by Henry Harrison Murray after 1841.

It was listed on the U.S. National Register of Historic Places in 1972.

== See also ==
- Beeches (Frankfort, Kentucky), the one other comparable building on Leestown Pike, also NRHP-listed
