= Frankfort Commercial Historic District (Frankfort, Kentucky) =

Historic district in Kentucky, United States

- U.S. National Register of Historic Places
- U.S. Historic district
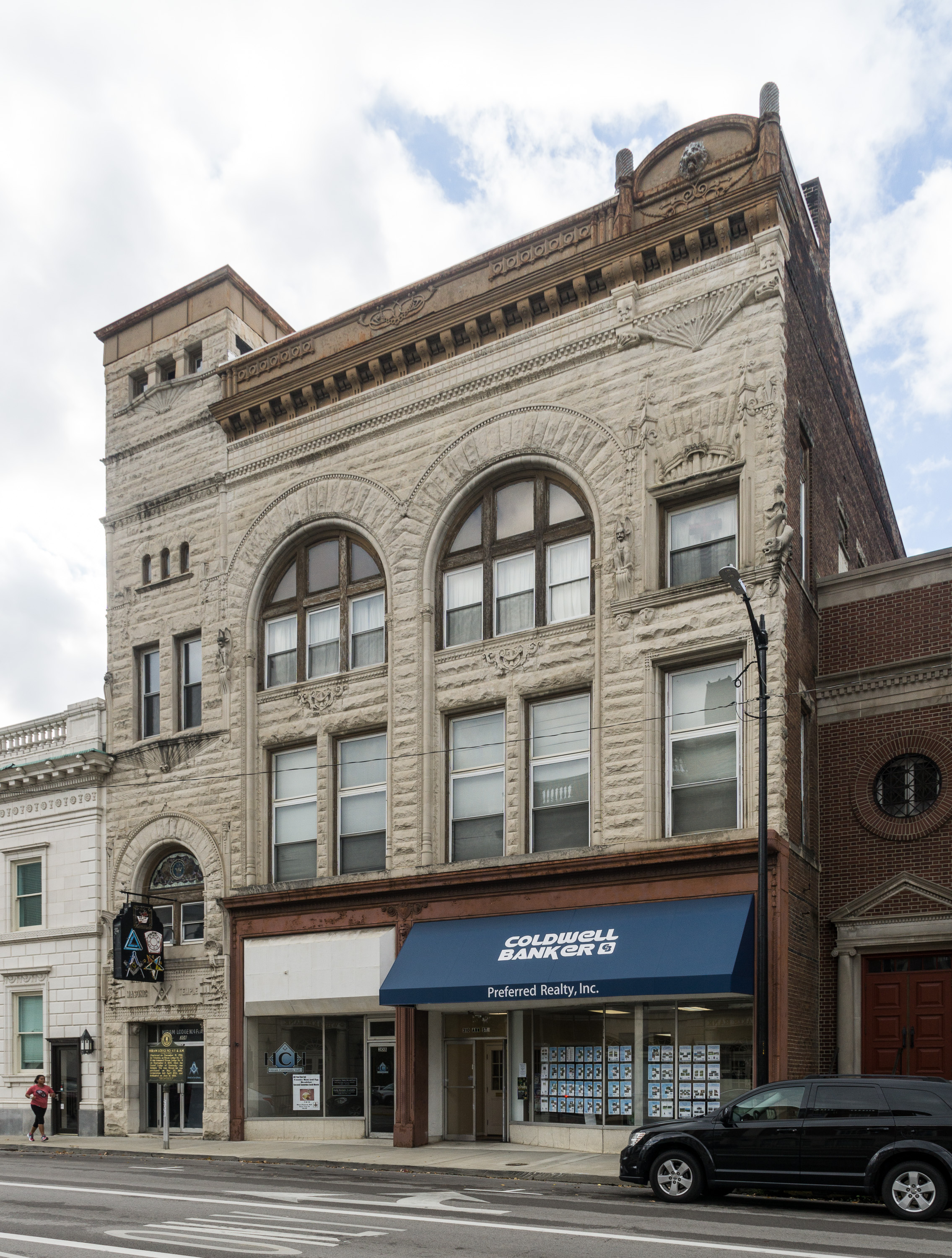
- Hiram Lodge No. 4 (Masonic Lodge)

- Location within Kentucky Location within the United States
- Location: Both sides of Kentucky River at Bridge St., Frankfort, Kentucky
- Coordinates: 38.19788°N 84.87635°W
- Area: 24 acres (9.7 ha)
- Architect: Multiple
- Architectural style: Late 19th and 20th Century Revivals, Late 19th and Early 20th Century American Movements
- NRHP reference No.: 79000986
- Added to NRHP: May 10, 1979

The Frankfort Commercial Historic District in Frankfort, Kentucky is a 24 acres (9.7 ha) historic district which was listed on the National Register of Historic Places in 1979. It included 86 contributing buildings and one contributing structure.

Included in the district are buildings on both sides of the Kentucky River. These include:

- Old State Capitol, designed by Gideon Shryock
- Frankfort City Hall
- Franklin County Courthouse, St. Clair Street, designed by Gideon Shryock
- Hampton-Williams House (1845), 101 West Main Street, built of stone in a pattern like Flemish bond brickwork
- Duvall Building, 221-223 St. Clair Street, Italianate-styled
- Oddfellows Lodge (1871), 315 Saint Clair Street
- Old Farmers Bank (c.1851), 216 West Main Street, attributed to Isaiah Rogers, in Renaissance Revival style
- Old State National Bank, 200 West Main Street, Beaux-Arts

- Masonic Lodge (1893), 308 Ann Street, stone, designed by Clarke and Loomis in Romanesque style
- D.C. Crutcher Building, 202-204 West Main Street, designed by Clarke and Loomis in Romanesque style
- Singing Bridge
