= Jett, Kentucky =

Unincorporated community in Kentucky, United States

- Unincorporated community
- Location within the state of Kentucky Jett (the United States)
- Coordinates: 38°10′43″N 84°48′52″W
- Country: United States
- State: Kentucky
- County: Franklin
- Elevation: 797 ft (243 m)
- Time zone: UTC-5 (Eastern (EST))
  - Summer (DST): UTC-4 (EDT)
- ZIP codes: 40338
- Area code: 502
- GNIS feature ID: 495255

Jett is an unincorporated community within Franklin County, Kentucky, United States. It was part of a farm acquired by Thomas Jett, in 1822. In 1882, Jett's heirs donated land for a Louisville & Nashville Railroad station which was named for him. Its post office (originally known as Fogg, KY for a few months) is closed, being open from 1883 to March 31, 1971. The community is located near the junction of Interstate 64 and US 60.
