= Franklin County, Kentucky =

County in Kentucky, United States

- County
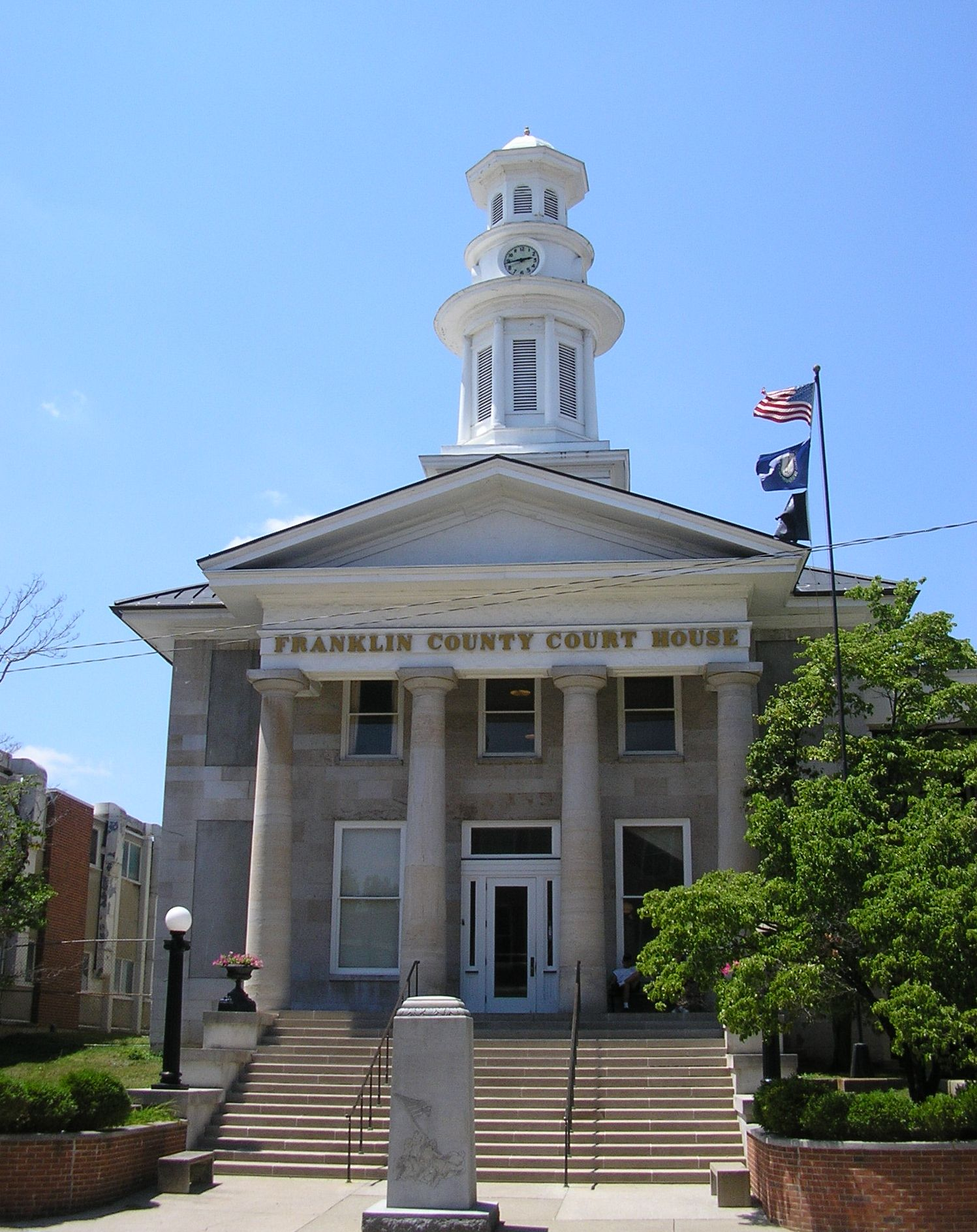
- Franklin County courthouse in Frankfort

- Flag

- Location within the U.S. state of Kentucky
- Coordinates: 38°14′N 84°53′W
- Country: United States
- State: Kentucky
- Founded: May 10, 1795
- Named for: Benjamin Franklin
- Seat: Frankfort
- Largest city: Frankfort

Government
  - Judge/Executive: Michael Mueller (D)

Area
  - Total: 212 sq mi (550 km^{2})
  - Land: 208 sq mi (540 km^{2})
  - Water: 4.3 sq mi (11 km^{2}) 2.0%

Population (2020)
  - Total: 51,541
  - Estimate (2025): 52,649 ▲
  - Density: 248/sq mi (95.7/km^{2})
- Time zone: UTC−5 (Eastern)
  - Summer (DST): UTC−4 (EDT)
- Congressional district: 1st
- Website: franklincounty.ky.gov

Franklin County is a county located in the U.S. state of Kentucky. As of the 2020 census, the population was 51,541, making it the second-least populous capital county in the United States after Hughes County, South Dakota. Its county seat and most populous city is Frankfort, the state capital. The county was formed in 1795 from parts of Woodford, Mercer and Shelby counties, and was named after the American inventor and statesman Benjamin Franklin. Franklin County is part of the Frankfort, Kentucky Micropolitan Statistical Area. It shares a name with Franklin County in Ohio, where Columbus is located. This makes it one of two pairs of capital cities in counties of the same name, along with Marion Counties in Oregon and Indiana.

== History ==
The three original counties of Kentucky (Jefferson, Fayette and Lincoln counties) intersected in what is today Franklin County. Franklin County was established in 1795 from land given by Mercer, Shelby, and Woodford counties. Franklin was the 18th Kentucky county in order of formation.

== Geography ==
According to the United States Census Bureau, the county has a total area of 212 square miles (550 km^{2}), of which 208 square miles (540 km^{2}) is land and 4.3 square miles (11 km^{2}) (2.0%) is water.

=== Transit ===
- Frankfort Transit

=== Major highways ===
- Interstate 64
- US 127
- US 60
- US 421
- US 460
- KY 676

=== Adjacent counties ===
- Owen County (north)
- Scott County (east)
- Woodford County (southeast)
- Anderson County (south)
- Shelby County (west)
- Henry County (northwest)

== Politics ==
United States presidential election results for Franklin County, Kentucky
Year	Republican		Democratic		Third party(ies)	
Year	No.	%	No.	%	No.	%
1912	783	17.85%	2,980	67.93%	624	14.22%
1916	1,426	29.70%	3,345	69.67%	30	0.62%
1920	2,710	31.48%	5,878	68.28%	21	0.24%
1924	2,826	37.15%	4,678	61.50%	102	1.34%
1928	3,485	47.45%	3,853	52.46%	7	0.10%
1932	2,034	24.20%	6,331	75.33%	39	0.46%
1936	2,010	24.34%	6,222	75.35%	26	0.31%
1940	1,927	21.66%	6,956	78.18%	14	0.16%
1944	2,050	24.27%	6,356	75.24%	42	0.50%
1948	1,962	21.79%	6,679	74.19%	362	4.02%
1952	3,097	29.75%	7,309	70.20%	5	0.05%
1956	4,047	38.35%	6,412	60.76%	94	0.89%
1960	4,742	40.21%	7,052	59.79%	0	0.00%
1964	2,320	18.57%	10,130	81.08%	44	0.35%
1968	4,057	30.82%	6,396	48.58%	2,712	20.60%
1972	7,781	56.88%	5,601	40.95%	297	2.17%
1976	5,536	33.67%	10,475	63.71%	430	2.62%
1980	6,455	34.84%	11,193	60.40%	882	4.76%
1984	11,057	58.12%	7,790	40.95%	177	0.93%
1988	9,805	50.88%	9,271	48.11%	195	1.01%
1992	7,591	36.09%	9,896	47.05%	3,544	16.85%
1996	7,132	35.02%	11,251	55.24%	1,984	9.74%
2000	10,209	47.15%	10,853	50.12%	592	2.73%
2004	12,281	50.89%	11,620	48.15%	232	0.96%
2008	11,911	49.47%	11,767	48.87%	401	1.67%
2012	11,345	48.61%	11,535	49.43%	457	1.96%
2016	11,819	49.52%	10,717	44.91%	1,329	5.57%
2020	12,900	49.48%	12,652	48.53%	520	1.99%
2024	13,246	51.41%	11,996	46.56%	521	2.02%

In recent presidential elections the county has supported both Democrats and Republicans. In 2000 Democrat Al Gore won 50% of the vote to Republican George W. Bush's 47%. In 2004, Bush won 50% of the vote to Democrat John Kerry's 48%. In 2008 Republican John McCain defeated Democrat Barack Obama 49.47% to 48.87%, a difference of only 144 votes, only for Obama to narrowly edge out Mitt Romney in 2012. However, Donald Trump won the county in 2016. He won it again in 2020, but only by a slim margin of 248 votes. In 2023, incumbent Democratic governor Andy Beshear won it by a large margin over Republican attorney general Daniel Cameron, getting 68% of the vote.

The county voted "No" on 2022 Kentucky Amendment 2, an anti-abortion ballot measure, by 67% to 33%, and backed Donald Trump with 49.5% of the vote to Joe Biden's 48.5% in the 2020 presidential election.

=== Elected officials ===
Elected officials as of January 3, 2025
U.S. House	James Comer (R)	KY 1
Ky. Senate	Gex Williams (R)	20
Ky. House	Daniel Fister (R)	56
Ky. House	Erika Hancock (D)	57

== Demographics ==
Historical population
Census	Pop.	Note	%±
1800	5,078		—
1810	8,013		57.8%
1820	11,024		37.6%
1830	9,254		−16.1%
1840	9,420		1.8%
1850	12,462		32.3%
1860	12,694		1.9%
1870	15,300		20.5%
1880	18,699		22.2%
1890	21,267		13.7%
1900	20,852		−2.0%
1910	21,135		1.4%
1920	19,357		−8.4%
1930	21,064		8.8%
1940	23,308		10.7%
1950	25,933		11.3%
1960	29,421		13.5%
1970	34,481		17.2%
1980	41,830		21.3%
1990	43,781		4.7%
2000	47,687		8.9%
2010	49,285		3.4%
2020	51,541		4.6%
2025 (est.)	52,649	▲	2.1%
U.S. Decennial Census; 1790-1960 1900-1990; 1990-2000 2010-2020

=== 2020 census ===
As of the 2020 census, the county had a population of 51,541. The median age was 41.2 years. 21.1% of residents were under the age of 18 and 18.5% of residents were 65 years of age or older. For every 100 females there were 92.9 males, and for every 100 females age 18 and over there were 90.0 males age 18 and over.

The racial makeup of the county was 81.0% White, 8.7% Black or African American, 0.3% American Indian and Alaska Native, 2.0% Asian, 0.0% Native Hawaiian and Pacific Islander, 2.0% from some other race, and 6.0% from two or more races. Hispanic or Latino residents of any race comprised 4.0% of the population.

73.4% of residents lived in urban areas, while 26.6% lived in rural areas.

There were 21,838 households in the county, of which 28.2% had children under the age of 18 living with them and 31.1% had a female householder with no spouse or partner present. About 32.6% of all households were made up of individuals and 13.4% had someone living alone who was 65 years of age or older.

There were 24,000 housing units, of which 9.0% were vacant. Among occupied housing units, 62.5% were owner-occupied and 37.5% were renter-occupied. The homeowner vacancy rate was 1.7% and the rental vacancy rate was 8.0%.

=== 2000 census ===
As of the census of 2000, there were 47,687 people, 19,907 households, and 12,840 families residing in the county. The population density was 227 per square mile (88/km^{2}). There were 21,409 housing units at an average density of 102 per square mile (39/km^{2}). The racial makeup of the county was 87.98% White, 9.36% Black or African American, 0.13% Native American, 0.72% Asian, 0.02% Pacific Islander, 0.55% from other races, and 1.24% from two or more races. 1.11% of the population were Hispanic or Latino of any race.

There were 19,907 households, out of which 29.50% had children under the age of 18 living with them, 48.70% were married couples living together, 12.20% had a female householder with no husband present, and 35.50% were non-families. 30.40% of all households were made up of individuals, and 10.60% had someone living alone who was 65 years of age or older. The average household size was 2.30 and the average family size was 2.86.

22.60% of the population was under the age of 18, 9.70% from 18 to 24, 30.50% from 25 to 44, 24.90% from 45 to 64, and 12.30% who were 65 years of age or older. The median age was 37 years. For every 100 females, there were 93.70 males. For every 100 females age 18 and over, there were 89.70 males.

The median income for a household in the county was $40,011, and the median income for a family was $51,052. Males had a median income of $32,826 versus $26,201 for females. The per capita income for the county was $21,229. About 6.90% of families and 10.70% of the population were below the poverty line, including 12.80% of those under age 18 and 12.20% of those age 65 or over.

== Education ==
The county is served by two public school districts: Franklin County Public Schools and Frankfort Independent Schools.

=== Franklin County Public Schools ===
This district takes in almost all of the county, including the majority of the city of Frankfort. It operates the following schools:

- Bridgeport Elementary School (grades K-5)
- Collins Lane Elementary School (grades K-5)
- Early Childhood Education Center (grades K-1)
- Elkhorn Elementary School (grades 2–5)
- Hearn Elementary School (grades 2–5)
- Peaks Mill Elementary School (grades 2–5)
- Westridge Elementary School (grades K-5)
- Bondurant Middle School (grades 6–8)
- Elkhorn Middle School (grades 6–8)
- Franklin County High School (grades 9–12)
- Western Hills High School (grades 9–12)
- The Academy (grades 9–12) (For kids with problems/juveniles)
- Franklin County Career and Technical Center (grades 9–12) (Career center for all public high schools in the county.)

=== Frankfort Independent Schools ===
This district serves an area roughly covering the Frankfort neighborhoods known as "downtown", South Frankfort (the vicinity of the state capitol building), and Bellepoint. It operates two schools:

- Second Street School (grades K-6)
- Frankfort High School (grades 7–12)

=== Private schools ===
- Capital Day School (grades PreK-8)
- Frankfort Christian Academy (grades K-12)
- Good Shepherd Catholic School (grades PreK-8)

=== University ===
- Kentucky State University

== Parks ==
- Capitol View Park
- Cove Spring Park and Nature Preserve
- Dolly Graham Park
- East Frankfort Park
- Josephine Sculpture Park
- Juniper Hill Park and Golf Course
- Lakeview Park and Golf Course
- Leslie Morris Park on Fort Hill: 120 acres (0.49 km^{2}) of woodland overlooking downtown Frankfort. It contains trails that guide visitors through the remains of earthwork forts that were the main defensive position for Union troops protecting the city during an 1864 Civil War skirmish.
- Riverview Park and riverside walk
- Todd Park

== Communities ==
=== City ===
- Frankfort (county seat)

=== Unincorporated communities ===
- Bald Knob
- Bridgeport
- Forks of Elkhorn
- Jett
- Peaks Mill
- Switzer

== See also ==
- National Register of Historic Places listings in Franklin County, Kentucky
