= National Register of Historic Places listings in Fayette County, Kentucky =

Location of Fayette County in Kentucky

This is a list of the National Register of Historic Places listings in Fayette County, Kentucky.

This is intended to be a complete list of the properties and districts on the National Register of Historic Places in Fayette County, Kentucky, United States. The locations of National Register properties and districts for which the latitude and longitude coordinates are included below, may be seen in a map.

There are 181 properties and districts listed on the National Register in the county, of which 3 are National Historic Landmarks. Another 3 properties were once listed but have been removed.

This National Park Service list is complete through NPS recent listings posted August 28, 2026.

== Current listings ==
	Name on the Register	Image	Date listed	Location	City or town	Description
1	African Cemetery No. 2	African Cemetery No. 2	March 31, 2004 (#04000245)	419 E. 7th St. 38°03′04″N 84°28′41″W	Lexington	
2	James Allen House	James Allen House	December 30, 1982 (#82001564)	1020 Lane Allen Rd. 38°01′54″N 84°33′10″W	Lexington	
3	Ashland	Ashland	October 15, 1966 (#66000357)	2 miles (3.2 km) southeast of downtown Lexington on Richmond Rd. 38°01′43″N 84°28′48″W	Lexington	
4	Ashland Park Historic District	Ashland Park Historic District	March 31, 1986 (#86000755)	Roughly bounded by Ashland Ave., Richmond Rd., Chinoe Rd., and Fontaine Rd. 38°01′45″N 84°28′56″W	Lexington	
5	Athens Historic District		October 11, 1979 (#79000971)	Athens-Boonesboro Pike; 37°56′58″N 84°21′53″W	Athens	
6	Abraham Barton House	Abraham Barton House	August 26, 1977 (#77000611)	200 N. Upper St. 38°02′56″N 84°29′42″W	Lexington	
7	T.D. Basye House	T.D. Basye House	October 22, 1987 (#87001886)	3501 Georgetown Rd. 38°07′36″N 84°31′38″W	Lexington	
8	Bates Log House		August 26, 1982 (#82002683)	5143 Spurr Rd. 38°07′10″N 84°34′11″W	Lexington	Exceptionally large log house built c.1800.
9	James Burnie Beck House	James Burnie Beck House	August 26, 1982 (#82002684)	209 E. High St. 38°02′35″N 84°29′46″W	Lexington	
10	Bell Court Neighborhood Historic District	Bell Court Neighborhood Historic District	December 8, 1980 (#80001507)	Roughly bounded by railroad tracks, Main St., Boonesboro and Walton Aves. 38°02′22″N 84°29′09″W	Lexington	
11	Bell Place	Bell Place	February 17, 1978 (#78001312)	Sayre Ave. 38°02′20″N 84°29′09″W	Lexington	
12	John Bell House		June 23, 1983 (#83002757)	Kentucky Route 1978; 38°04′59″N 84°31′48″W	Lexington	
13	Boone Creek Rural Historic District		August 19, 1994 (#94000839)	Roughly bounded by Interstate 75, Cleveland Rd., Athens-Boonesboro Rd. and Grimes Rd. 37°56′21″N 84°21′51″W	Lexington vicinity	Extends into Clark County
14	Botherum	Botherum	March 7, 1973 (#73000795)	341 Madison Pl. 38°02′59″N 84°30′26″W	Lexington	
15	Bowman Houses		August 9, 1979 (#79000973)	West of Lexington on Bowman's Mill Rd. 38°00′31″N 84°35′55″W	Lexington	
16	Bowman Mill Road Rural Historic District		July 28, 1999 (#99000901)	Bowman Mill Rd., Parkers Mill Rd., and Cave Hill Ln. 38°00′48″N 84°35′56″W	Lexington	
17	Brand-Barrow House	Brand-Barrow House	August 11, 1976 (#76000866)	203 E. 4th St. 38°02′58″N 84°29′18″W	Lexington	
18	John C. Breckinridge Memorial	John C. Breckinridge Memorial	July 17, 1997 (#97000705)	Courthouse Lawn, junction of N. Upper and E. Main Sts. 38°02′52″N 84°29′54″W	Lexington	Moved to Lexington Cemetery in July 2018.
19	Joshua Brown House	Joshua Brown House	December 27, 1979 (#79000974)	2705 Tates Creek Rd. 38°00′43″N 84°29′47″W	Lexington	
20	Buenna Hill		June 29, 1983 (#83002758)	Off Ferguson Rd. 38°10′22″N 84°24′18″W	Centerville	
21	John Burrier House		June 23, 1983 (#83002759)	Kentucky Route 1966; 38°00′47″N 84°37′14″W	Lexington	
22	Cadentown School	Cadentown School	April 5, 2006 (#06000213)	705 Caden Ln. 38°00′38″N 84°25′48″W	Lexington	
23	Cave Place		December 5, 1980 (#80001508)	West of Lexington; 38°01′07″N 84°35′04″W	Lexington	
24	Cave Spring		December 22, 1978 (#78001313)	Southeast of Lexington off U.S. Route 25; 37°56′53″N 84°23′48″W	Lexington	
25	Central Christian Church	Central Christian Church	September 11, 1979 (#79000975)	207 E. Short St. 38°02′44″N 84°29′39″W	Lexington	
26	Central Kentucky Blue Grass Seed Co.	Central Kentucky Blue Grass Seed Co.	August 3, 2005 (#05000790)	321 Henry St. 38°03′28″N 84°30′01″W	Lexington	
27	Chandler Normal School Building and Webster Hall	Chandler Normal School Building and Webster Hall	December 4, 1980 (#80001509)	548 Georgetown St. 38°03′50″N 84°30′07″W	Lexington	
28	Christ Church Episcopal	Christ Church Episcopal	October 21, 1976 (#76000867)	Church and Market Sts. 38°02′55″N 84°29′48″W	Lexington	
29	Clark Hardware Company Building	Clark Hardware Company Building	July 16, 1979 (#79000976)	367-369 W. Short St. and 142 N. Broadway; 38°02′58″N 84°29′56″W	Lexington	
30	John Clark House	John Clark House	November 25, 1980 (#80001510)	Tates Creek Pk. 38°00′47″N 84°29′36″W	Lexington	
31	Henry Clay's Law Office	Henry Clay's Law Office	March 11, 1971 (#71000340)	176 N. Mill St. 38°02′58″N 84°29′49″W	Lexington	
32	Cleveland-Rogers House		August 26, 1980 (#80001511)	Lexington at 8151 Richmond Rd. 37°54′09″N 84°21′14″W	Lexington	
33	Cloud House	Cloud House	June 17, 1982 (#82002685)	3740 Versailles Rd. 38°02′03″N 84°35′17″W	Lexington	
34	William Conant House		February 22, 1991 (#91000123)	1701 Elkchester Rd. 38°04′42″N 84°36′25″W	Lexington	
35	Confederate Soldier Monument in Lexington	Confederate Soldier Monument in Lexington	July 17, 1997 (#97000703)	833 W. Main St. 38°03′31″N 84°30′41″W	Lexington	
36	Constitution Historic District	Constitution Historic District	August 30, 1982 (#82002686)	Roughly bounded by E. 3rd., Limestone, Walnut, and Pleasant Stone Sts. 38°02′54″N 84°29′31″W	Lexington	
37	Corinthia		June 29, 1983 (#83002760)	Off Lemons Mill Rd. 38°10′22″N 84°24′50″W	Centerville	
38	DeLong Agricultural Implements Warehouse	DeLong Agricultural Implements Warehouse	November 25, 1980 (#80001512)	Patterson St. 38°03′00″N 84°30′12″W	Lexington	Four-story brick warehouse; no longer extant
39	Delta		August 10, 1978 (#78001314)	South of Lexington at 2450 Armstrong Mill Rd. 37°57′08″N 84°27′57″W	Lexington	
40	Douglass School	Douglass School	August 14, 1998 (#98000933)	465 Price Rd. 38°04′12″N 84°30′22″W	Lexington	
41	Downtown Commercial District	Downtown Commercial District	August 25, 1983 (#83000559)	Roughly bounded by Main, Church, Walnut Sts., and Broadway; 38°02′50″N 84°29′50″W	Lexington	
42	Edgewood		August 4, 2016 (#16000494)	5910 Winchester Rd. 38°01′46″N 84°18′20″W	Lexington	
43	Elam Mound Archeological Site		October 10, 1975 (#75000749)	Address Restricted	Lexington	
44	Elley Villa	Elley Villa	January 9, 1978 (#78001315)	320 Linden Walk; 38°02′17″N 84°29′48″W	Lexington	
45	Elmendorf		March 14, 2023 (#100008737)	611 and 639 Iron Works Pike, 3931 Paris Pike; 38°06′38″N 84°25′21″W	Lexington	
46	Elsmere Park Historic District	Elsmere Park Historic District	April 26, 1976 (#76000868)	Off N. Broadway, between W. 6th and 7th Sts. 38°03′22″N 84°29′13″W	Lexington	
47	Episcopal Burying Ground and Chapel	Episcopal Burying Ground and Chapel	June 24, 1976 (#76000869)	251 E. 3rd St. 38°02′49″N 84°29′21″W	Lexington	
48	John G. Epping Company Bottling Works		August 31, 2026 (#100013336)	264 Walton Avenue; 38°02′27″N 84°28′49″W	Lexington	
48	Fairlawn		October 14, 1976 (#76000870)	6 miles (9.7 km) northeast of Lexington on U.S. Route 68; 38°06′55″N 84°23′34″W	Lexington	
49	Fayette National Bank Building	Fayette National Bank Building	February 27, 1980 (#80001513)	159-167 W. Main St. 38°02′50″N 84°29′53″W	Lexington	
50	Fayette Safety Vault and Trust Company Building	Fayette Safety Vault and Trust Company Building	August 11, 1980 (#80001514)	111-113 Cheapside St. 38°02′53″N 84°29′54″W	Lexington	
51	Featherston, Edmonson and Clark Houses	Featherston, Edmonson and Clark Houses	July 21, 1983 (#83002761)	218, 226, and 232 E. Maxwell St. 38°02′26″N 84°29′55″W	Lexington	
52	First African Baptist Church	First African Baptist Church	April 24, 1986 (#86000854)	264-272 E. Short St. 38°02′38″N 84°29′35″W	Lexington	
53	First Presbyterian Church, Lexington	First Presbyterian Church, Lexington	December 30, 1974 (#74000861)	174 N. Mill St. 38°02′57″N 84°29′49″W	Lexington	
54	Floral Hall	Floral Hall	August 29, 1977 (#77000612)	847 S. Broadway; 38°02′27″N 84°31′03″W	Lexington	
55	Monsieur Giron's Confectionary	Monsieur Giron's Confectionary	December 27, 1974 (#74000866)	125 N. Mill St. 38°02′55″N 84°29′54″W	Lexington	
56	George W. Grant House		October 24, 1980 (#80001515)	519 W. 4th St. 38°03′27″N 84°29′48″W	Lexington	
57	Gratz Park Historic District	Gratz Park Historic District	March 14, 1973 (#73000796)	Bounded by 2nd and 3rd Sts., the Byway, and Bark Alley; 38°03′00″N 84°29′46″W	Lexington	Includes the Hunt–Morgan House.
58	Graves Tavern	Graves Tavern	June 23, 1983 (#83002766)	Off U.S. Route 60; 38°02′28″N 84°37′37″W	Versailles	
59	Grimes House and Mill Complex		June 21, 1982 (#82002687)	Grimes Mill Rd. 37°54′57″N 84°20′34″W	Lexington	
60	Guilfoil Village Site (15FA176)		December 5, 1985 (#85003063)	Address Restricted	Athens	
61	Hartland	Hartland	April 2, 1987 (#87000568)	2230 Armstrong Mill Rd. 37°57′35″N 84°28′21″W	Lexington	
62	Samuel T. Hayes House		March 19, 1980 (#80001516)	Southeast of Lexington on Sulphur Well Rd. 37°58′57″N 84°21′23″W	Lexington	
63	George Headley House		March 4, 1991 (#91000122)	4435 Old Frankfort Pike; 38°05′42″N 84°36′34″W	Lexington	
64	Hal Price Headley Sr. House	Hal Price Headley Sr. House	November 15, 2010 (#10000907)	1236 Standish Way; 38°02′35″N 84°33′44″W	Lexington	
65	Helm Place		August 3, 1978 (#78001318)	Southwest of Lexington on Bowman Mill Rd. 38°00′10″N 84°35′19″W	Lexington	
66	Higgins Block	Higgins Block	August 12, 1977 (#77000613)	145-151 W. Main St. 38°02′49″N 84°29′52″W	Lexington	
67	Highland Hall	Highland Hall	December 16, 1977 (#77000614)	6208 Richmond Rd. 37°56′04″N 84°23′50″W	Lexington	
68	Hollywood Terrace Historic District		July 8, 2008 (#08000652)	Tates Creek Rd. and the rear property lines of the properties facing Euclid, Tremont, and Park Ave. 38°01′33″N 84°29′29″W	Lexington	
69	Hurricane Hall	Hurricane Hall	April 22, 1976 (#76000871)	North of Lexington off U.S. Route 25; 38°08′09″N 84°32′11″W	Lexington	
70	Innes House		June 29, 1983 (#83002762)	Off Lemons Mill Rd. 38°10′23″N 84°24′30″W	Centerville	
71	Thomas January House	Thomas January House	December 27, 1974 (#74000862)	437 W. 2nd St. 38°03′08″N 84°29′54″W	Lexington	
72	Keeneland-Keeneland Racetrack	Keeneland-Keeneland Racetrack	September 24, 1986 (#86003487)	Off Versailles and Rice Rds. 38°02′57″N 84°36′22″W	Lexington	
73	Matthew Kennedy House	Matthew Kennedy House	June 19, 1973 (#73000797)	216 N. Limestone St. 38°02′54″N 84°29′37″W	Lexington	
74	Kinkead House	Kinkead House	June 29, 1982 (#82002688)	362 Walnut St. 38°02′56″N 84°29′19″W	Lexington	
75	Henry P. Kinkead House	Henry P. Kinkead House	July 12, 1984 (#84001411)	403 N. Martin Luther King Blvd. 38°02′58″N 84°29′19″W	Lexington	
76	The Ladies' Confederate Memorial	The Ladies' Confederate Memorial	July 17, 1997 (#97000706)	833 W. Main St. 38°03′32″N 84°30′42″W	Lexington	
77	Lemon Hill		November 20, 1978 (#78001319)	East of Lexington off U.S. Route 60; 38°03′16″N 84°20′37″W	Lexington	
78	James Lemon Houses	James Lemon Houses	November 21, 1974 (#74000863)	329-331 S. Mill St. 38°02′47″N 84°30′06″W	Lexington	
79	Lewis Manor		April 26, 1976 (#76000872)	Northwest of Lexington on Viley Rd. 38°04′36″N 84°33′07″W	Lexington	
80	Lexington Cemetery and Henry Clay Monument	Lexington Cemetery and Henry Clay Monument	July 12, 1976 (#76000873)	833 W. Main St. 38°03′43″N 84°30′41″W	Lexington	
81	Lexington City National Bank Building	Lexington City National Bank Building	April 1, 1980 (#80001517)	259-265 W. Main St. 38°02′52″N 84°29′55″W	Lexington	
82	Lexington Dry Goods Company Building	Lexington Dry Goods Company Building	May 31, 1988 (#88000182)	249-251 E. Main St. 38°02′38″N 84°29′38″W	Lexington	
83	Lexington Herald Building	Lexington Herald Building	October 29, 1982 (#82001565)	121 Walnut St. 38°02′44″N 84°29′41″W	Lexington	
84	Lexington Hospitality Motor Inn		September 5, 2024 (#100010762)	2143 North Broadway Street; 38°04′42″N 84°27′14″W	Lexington	
85	Lexington National Cemetery	Lexington National Cemetery	September 3, 1998 (#98001135)	833 W. Main St. 38°03′28″N 84°30′40″W	Lexington	
86	Lexington Veterans Administration Hospital	Lexington Veterans Administration Hospital	March 28, 2012 (#12000150)	2250 Leestown Rd. 38°04′20″N 84°32′24″W	Lexington	
87	Lexington-Fayette County Government Building Block	Lexington-Fayette County Government Building Block	May 19, 1983 (#83002763)	200-228 E. Main St. 38°02′41″N 84°29′44″W	Lexington	
88	Liggett and Myers Harpring Tobacco Storage Warehouse	Liggett and Myers Harpring Tobacco Storage Warehouse	March 27, 2013 (#13000110)	1211 Manchester St. 38°03′27″N 84°31′12″W	Lexington	The Liggett and Myers Harpring Tobacco Storage Warehouse as it originally was - with both water towers.
89	Liggett and Myers Tobacco Re-handling Facility	Liggett and Myers Tobacco Re-handling Facility	April 11, 2003 (#03000261)	200 Bolivar St. 38°02′33″N 84°30′23″W	Lexington	
90	Mary Todd Lincoln House	Mary Todd Lincoln House	August 12, 1971 (#71000341)	574 W. Main St. 38°03′05″N 84°30′10″W	Lexington	
91	Loudoun House	Loudoun House	February 6, 1973 (#73000798)	Corner of Bryan Ave. and Castlewood Dr. 38°03′19″N 84°28′33″W	Lexington	
92	Luigart Malt House		January 15, 2025 (#100011307)	110 Luigart Court; 754-758 North Limestone; 38°03′23″N 84°28′58″W	Lexington	
93	Mansfield	Mansfield	August 19, 1982 (#82002689)	Richmond Rd. 38°01′16″N 84°28′13″W	Lexington	
94	Courtney Mathews House	Courtney Mathews House	August 18, 2011 (#11000535)	547 Breckinridge St. 38°02′53″N 84°28′37″W	Lexington	
95	Maxwell Place	Maxwell Place	October 29, 1982 (#82000472)	Rose St., University of Kentucky; 38°02′10″N 84°30′11″W	Lexington	
96	McAdams and Morford Building	McAdams and Morford Building	October 25, 1973 (#73000799)	200-210 W. Main St. 38°02′50″N 84°29′54″W	Lexington	
97	Benjamin McCann House		June 3, 1982 (#82002690)	Old Richmond Pike; 37°57′51″N 84°25′01″W	Lexington	
98	Neal McCann House	Neal McCann House	June 3, 1982 (#82002691)	5364 Todds Rd. 37°59′37″N 84°21′07″W	Lexington	
99	John McCauley House	John McCauley House	December 4, 1980 (#80001518)	319 Lexington Ave. 38°02′28″N 84°30′00″W	Lexington	
100	McConnell Springs	McConnell Springs	January 17, 1976 (#76000874)	Address Restricted	Lexington	
101	James McConnell House	James McConnell House	June 23, 1983 (#83002764)	Old Frankfort Pike; 38°03′27″N 84°31′15″W	Lexington	
102	William McConnell House	William McConnell House	June 23, 1983 (#83002765)	Forbes Rd. 38°03′33″N 84°31′24″W	Lexington	
103	McCracken-Wilgus House	McCracken-Wilgus House	December 22, 1978 (#78001320)	327 Wilgus St. 38°02′43″N 84°29′09″W	Lexington	
104	Dr. John McGarvey House	Dr. John McGarvey House	May 15, 1974 (#74000864)	362 S. Mill St. 38°02′44″N 84°30′08″W	Lexington	
105	Charles McPheeters House	Charles McPheeters House	May 15, 1974 (#74000865)	352 S. Mill St. 38°02′45″N 84°30′07″W	Lexington	
106	Mentelle House		September 22, 2025 (#100012239)	116 Lincoln Avenue; 38°01′54″N 84°28′44″W	Lexington	
107	Mentelle Park	Mentelle Park	November 27, 1985 (#85002973)	Mentelle Pk. 38°02′06″N 84°28′48″W	Lexington	
108	Middle Reaches of Boone Creek Rural Historic District		May 31, 1996 (#96000429)	Roughly bounded by U.S. Route 421, Jones Nursery, Coombs Ferry, Sulpher Well Rds., and U.S. Route 25; 37°57′34″N 84°19′17″W	Lexington vicinity	Extends into Clark County
109	Miller Brothers Building	Miller Brothers Building	April 2, 1980 (#80001519)	359-361 W. Main St. 38°02′56″N 84°29′58″W	Lexington	
110	Moore-Redd-Frazer House	Moore-Redd-Frazer House	October 21, 1976 (#76000875)	Georgetown Pike; 38°04′48″N 84°30′47″W	Lexington	
111	John Hunt Morgan Memorial	John Hunt Morgan Memorial	July 17, 1997 (#97000704)	Courthouse Lawn, junction of N. Upper and E. Main St. 38°02′51″N 84°29′55″W	Lexington	Moved to Lexington Cemetery in July 2018.
112	Will Morton Tavern Stand	Will Morton Tavern Stand	January 3, 1978 (#78001321)	137 S. Limestone St. 38°02′44″N 84°29′54″W	Lexington	
113	William Morton House	William Morton House	June 10, 1975 (#75000750)	518 Limestone St. 38°03′08″N 84°29′14″W	Lexington	
114	Mt. Horeb Archeological District		February 12, 1998 (#98000088)	Address Restricted	Lexington	
115	Mt. Horeb Earthworks, Unit A	Mt. Horeb Earthworks, Unit A	October 10, 1975 (#75000751)	Address Restricted; 38°09′32″N 84°27′56″W	Lexington	
116	New Zion Historic District		December 4, 2008 (#08001118)	4972 Newtown Pike through 5200 Newtown Pike, and 103-135 New Zion Rd. 38°10′44″N 84°29′11″W	Georgetown	African American rural community founded around 1872 on land of two ex slaves. Extends into Scott County.
117	North Broadway-Short Street Historic District	North Broadway-Short Street Historic District	September 15, 1983 (#83000560)	N. Broadway and W. Short St. 38°02′59″N 84°29′55″W	Lexington	
118	North Limestone Commercial District	North Limestone Commercial District	November 3, 1983 (#83003652)	N. Limestone St. between Church and 3rd Sts. 38°02′52″N 84°29′43″W	Lexington	
119	Northeast Residential Historic District	Northeast Residential Historic District	October 17, 1985 (#85003151)	Roughly bounded by E. 5th St., Kleiser Ave. and Campsie Pl., E. 4th St., and Humbard Alley; 38°02′58″N 84°29′18″W	Lexington	
120	Northside Historic Residential District	Northside Historic Residential District	August 28, 1979 (#79000977)	Roughly bounded by railroad tracks, N. Limestone, W. Short, and Newtown Sts.; also 337-371 N. Limestone, 400-465 N. Limestone, and 356 Morris St. 38°03′17″N 84°29′37″W	Lexington	Second set of boundaries represents a boundary increase of May 24, 1982
121	Odd Fellows Temple	Odd Fellows Temple	February 27, 1980 (#80001520)	115-119 W. Main St. 38°02′48″N 84°29′50″W	Lexington	
122	Old Morrison, Transylvania College	Old Morrison, Transylvania College	October 15, 1966 (#66000358)	W. 3rd St. between Upper St. and Broadway; 38°03′05″N 84°29′36″W	Lexington	
123	Opera House and Yates Bookshop Building	Opera House and Yates Bookshop Building	June 11, 1975 (#75000752)	141 and 145 N. Broadway; 38°02′59″N 84°29′57″W	Lexington	
124	Henry Payne House		June 23, 1983 (#83002767)	Off U.S. Route 421; 38°06′56″N 84°37′01″W	Lexington	
125	Pensacola Park Historic District	Pensacola Park Historic District	June 22, 2020 (#100005303)	109-199 Rosemont Gdn., 105-175 Suburban Ct., 101-224 Lackawanna Rd., 101-166 Wabash Dr., 96-171 Goodrich Ave., 1700, 1800, 1900 blocks of Nicholasville Rd., 101-177 Penmoken Park, 1800 block Pensacola Dr., 1800 block Norfolk Dr. 38°01′02″N 84°31′08″W	Lexington	
126	James E. Pepper Distillery	James E. Pepper Distillery	February 11, 2009 (#09000006)	1200 Manchester St. 38°03′24″N 84°31′12″W	Lexington	
127	Peoples Federal Savings and Loan Association	Peoples Federal Savings and Loan Association	February 12, 2016 (#15000650)	343 S. Broadway; 38°02′49″N 84°30′10″W	Lexington	no longer extant
128	James Pettit's Mill		June 23, 1983 (#83002768)	Kentucky Route 418; 37°55′56″N 84°20′24″W	Ford	
129	Pisgah Rural Historic District		February 10, 1989 (#88003348)	Area northeast of Versailles roughly bounded by S. Elkhorn Creek, U.S. Route 60, and Big Sink Rd. 38°05′08″N 84°39′40″W	Versailles vicinity	
130	William Poindexter House	William Poindexter House	May 15, 1974 (#74000867)	359 S. Mill St. 38°02′45″N 84°30′09″W	Lexington	
131	Pope Villa	Pope Villa	August 30, 2018 (#05000785)	326 Grosvenor Ave. 38°02′23″N 84°29′44″W	Lexington	
132	Poplar Grove		August 19, 1982 (#82002693)	2088 Parkers Mill Rd. 38°01′42″N 84°34′27″W	Lexington	
133	Pugh Price House		September 25, 1979 (#79000978)	2245 Liberty Rd. 38°01′40″N 84°26′36″W	Lexington	
134	Williamson Price House		September 25, 1979 (#79000979)	2497 Liberty Rd. 38°01′14″N 84°26′09″W	Lexington	
135	Lewis Ramsey Jr. House		March 6, 1991 (#91000121)	3797 Old Frankfort Pike; 38°05′17″N 84°35′36″W	Lexington	
136	Randall Building Bogaert's Jewelry Store	Randall Building Bogaert's Jewelry Store	September 9, 1982 (#82002694)	127-129 W. Main St. 38°02′49″N 84°29′50″W	Lexington	
137	Redd Road Rural Historic District		February 28, 1991 (#91000153)	Area largely south and east of the junction of Redd and Frankfort Roads; 38°05′30″N 84°37′34″W	Lexington vicinity	
138	Ridgely House	Ridgely House	May 7, 1973 (#73000800)	190 Market St. 38°02′58″N 84°29′45″W	Lexington	
139	Rockefeller Mound		February 12, 1998 (#98000087)	Address Restricted	Lexington	
140	Joseph Hale Rogers House		November 15, 1979 (#79000980)	East of Lexington on Bryan Station Pike; 38°04′37″N 84°24′53″W	Lexington	
141	Rose Hill	Rose Hill	December 30, 1974 (#74000868)	461 N. Limestone St. 38°03′08″N 84°29′22″W	Lexington	
142	Robert Russel House		June 23, 1983 (#83002769)	Off Kentucky Route 353; 38°08′55″N 84°25′43″W	Centerville	
143	Russell School	Russell School	April 5, 2006 (#06000215)	201 W. 5th St. 38°03′14″N 84°29′22″W	Lexington	
144	Sayre Female Institute	Sayre Female Institute	August 19, 1982 (#82002695)	194 N. Limestone St. 38°02′53″N 84°29′39″W	Lexington	
145	Drs. George W. & Margaret Schwert House		May 2, 2024 (#100010248)	3316 Braemer Drive; 37°59′54″N 84°30′15″W	Lexington	
146	Scott and Wilson Houses District	Scott and Wilson Houses District	December 31, 1974 (#74000869)	324, 328, 330, 336 S. Mill St. 38°02′46″N 84°30′06″W	Lexington	
147	Second Presbyterian Church	Second Presbyterian Church	August 11, 1980 (#80001522)	460 E. Main St. 38°02′24″N 84°29′25″W	Lexington	
148	Shady Side		November 7, 1976 (#76000876)	4 miles (6.4 km) east of Lexington on U.S. Route 68; 38°05′27″N 84°25′45″W	Lexington	
149	Shelby Family Houses		November 17, 1978 (#78001322)	Southeast of Lexington on Richmond Rd., Shelby Lane, and Jacks Creek Pike; 37°56′11″N 84°25′24″W	Lexington	
150	Frederick Shryack House		June 23, 1983 (#83002770)	Off Kentucky Route 859; 38°03′44″N 84°20′03″W	Clintonville	
151	Mitchell Baker Smith Company Building		August 26, 1980 (#80001523)	230-232 W. Main St. 38°02′51″N 84°29′55″W	Lexington	
152	South Hill Historic District	South Hill Historic District	June 13, 1978 (#78001323)	Roughly bounded by S. Broadway, W. High, S. Limestone, and Pine Sts. 38°02′42″N 84°30′07″W	Lexington	
153	Southeast Greyhound Line Building		January 8, 2014 (#13001048)	101 W. Loudon St. 38°03′28″N 84°28′54″W	Lexington	
154	Southeast Lexington Residential and Commercial District	Southeast Lexington Residential and Commercial District	August 1, 1984 (#84001415)	Roughly bounded by High St., Rose Lane, and Lexington and Woodland Aves. 38°02′18″N 84°29′46″W	Lexington	
155	Southern Railway Passenger Depot	Southern Railway Passenger Depot	August 13, 1987 (#87001364)	701 S. Broadway; 38°02′34″N 84°30′37″W	Lexington	
156	Spindletop Farm		September 20, 2012 (#12000447)	3414 Ironworks Pike; 38°07′55″N 84°30′18″W	Lexington	
157	Spring Hill Farm	Spring Hill Farm	February 17, 1978 (#78001324)	1401 Old Frankfort Pike; 38°03′30″N 84°31′46″W	Lexington	
158	Springview Farm	Springview Farm	August 6, 2012 (#12000448)	3076 Royster Rd. 38°03′00″N 84°22′49″W	Lexington	
159	Drewsilla Steele House		February 22, 1991 (#91000120)	3951 Old Frankfort Pike; 38°05′22″N 84°35′55″W	Lexington	
160	Stony Point		August 7, 1979 (#79000981)	4935 Parkers Mill Rd. 38°01′34″N 84°37′10″W	Lexington	
161	William Lytle Todd House		July 17, 1979 (#79000982)	West of Lexington at 3725 Bowman Mill; 38°01′19″N 84°35′40″W	Lexington	
162	Trail's End Camp		June 26, 2019 (#100004120)	8030 Elk Lick Falls Rd. 37°53′59″N 84°21′25″W	Lexington vicinity	
163	Trotter's Warehouse		June 18, 1976 (#76000877)	122-124 S. Mill St. 38°02′51″N 84°29′58″W	Lexington	Site now occupied by the Lexington Financial Center
164	United States Post Office and Court House	United States Post Office and Court House	March 18, 1999 (#99000335)	101 Barr St. 38°02′50″N 84°29′42″W	Lexington	
165	Victorian Commercial Block	Victorian Commercial Block	July 21, 1978 (#78001325)	Bounded by Broadway, Main, Short, and Spring Sts. 38°02′58″N 84°30′00″W	Lexington	
166	Walnut Hill Presbyterian Church		May 7, 1973 (#73000801)	East of Lexington off U.S. Route 25; 37°58′07″N 84°25′29″W	Lexington	
167	Dr. Walter Warfield Building	Dr. Walter Warfield Building	August 11, 1980 (#80001524)	122-124 N. Upper St. and 140-160 W. Short St. 38°02′51″N 84°29′50″W	Lexington	
168	Thomas B. Watkins House	Thomas B. Watkins House	June 29, 1982 (#82002696)	1008 S. Broadway; 38°02′18″N 84°30′55″W	Lexington	No longer extant.
169	Henry Watt House	Henry Watt House	December 16, 1977 (#77000615)	703 W. High St. 38°03′01″N 84°30′17″W	Lexington	
170	Waveland	Waveland	August 12, 1971 (#71000342)	5 miles (8.0 km) south of Lexington off U.S. Route 27; 37°58′17″N 84°32′14″W	Lexington	
171	West Fayette County Rural Historic District		February 28, 1991 (#91000154)	Roughly bounded by Rice, Van Meter, Elk Chester, Yarnallton, Leestown, and Viley Rds., and U.S. Route 60; 38°04′02″N 84°35′00″W	Lexington	
172	West High Street Historic District	West High Street Historic District	July 10, 1969 (#69000366)	Northern side of the 100-300 blocks of W. High St. 38°02′49″N 84°30′03″W	Lexington	
173	Western Suburb Historic District	Western Suburb Historic District	June 18, 1976 (#76000878)	Irregular pattern along W. Short St. from Saunter to Kentucky Route 922; 38°03′09″N 84°30′09″W	Lexington	
174	Wolf Wile Department Store Building	Wolf Wile Department Store Building	July 31, 1996 (#96000795)	248-250 E. Main St. 38°02′37″N 84°29′40″W	Lexington	
175	Woodland	Woodland	August 28, 1975 (#75000753)	1 mile (1.6 km) east of Lexington on Squires Rd. off U.S. Route 421; 37°58′25″N 84°27′37″W	Lexington	
176	Woodlands Historic District	Woodlands Historic District	August 18, 1983 (#83002771)	Roughly bounded by Main and High Sts., Ashland and Woodland Aves. 38°02′06″N 84°29′21″W	Lexington	
177	Woodstock		May 12, 1975 (#75000754)	Todds Rd. 37°59′23″N 84°21′25″W	Lexington	
178	Woodward Heights Neighborhood Historic District	Woodward Heights Neighborhood Historic District	December 1, 1980 (#80001525)	Roughly bounded by High, Merino, and Pine Sts. 38°03′00″N 84°30′25″W	Lexington	
179	F.W. Woolworth Building	F.W. Woolworth Building	September 6, 2002 (#02000924)	106 Main St. 38°02′47″N 84°29′51″W	Lexington	Demolished in October 2004
180	Allen Worley and Foushee Houses	Allen Worley and Foushee Houses	January 20, 1976 (#76000879)	355, 361, and 367 S. Broadway; 38°02′48″N 84°30′13″W	Lexington	
181	Charles Young Park and Community Center		February 9, 2016 (#15000413)	540 E. 3rd St. 38°02′35″N 84°29′03″W	Lexington	

== Former listings ==
	Name on the Register	Image	Date listed	Date removed	Location	City or town	Description
1	Augustus Hall House		July 12, 1978 (#78001316)	August 19, 1980	165 Barr St.	Lexington	Demolished on August 4, 1979
2	Hathaway Houses		November 2, 1978 (#78001317)	December 7, 1981	760-766 Pine St.	Lexington	Destroyed by fire May 8, 1980.
3	West High Street Historic District		July 10, 1969 (#69000366)	April 11, 1975	North side of 100-300 blocks of west High Street	Lexington	All contributing buildings were demolished in 1970.
4	Milton Sanchez Storage Warehouse		October 17, 1980 (#80001521)	May 28, 1982	Merino St. 38°02′48″N 84°30′12″W	Lexington	Destroyed by fire on January 25, 1981

== See also ==
- List of National Historic Landmarks in Kentucky
- National Register of Historic Places listings in Kentucky
