= DeLong House =

DeLong House or Delong House or variations may refer to:

- A. E. C. Cottage No. 23, also known as DeLong Cottage, Anchorage, Alaska, listed on the National Register of Historic Places (NRHP)
- Zopher Delong House, Glens Falls, New York
- Harrison DeLong House, Sioux Falls, South Dakota, listed on the NRHP in Minnehaha County
- Homer B. DeLong House, Clinton, Wisconsin, listed on the NRHP in Rock County, Wisconsin
- Henry and Elizabeth Delong House, Waupaca, Wisconsin, listed on the NRHP in Waupaca County, Wisconsin

== See also ==
- DeLong Agricultural Implements Warehouse, Lexington, KY, NRHP-listed, listed on the NRHP in Fayette County, Kentucky
