= Shelby House =

Shelby House may refer to: (In order of state, then community:)

- Shelby Family Houses, Lexington, Kentucky
- McClure-Shelby House, Nicholasville, Kentucky
- Charles and Letitia Shelby Todd House, Shelbyville, Kentucky, listed on the NRHP in Shelby County
- Thomas Shelby House, Lexington, Missouri
- Shelby-Nicholson-Schindler House, Perryville, Missouri
- Shelby House (Botkins, Ohio)
