= Douglass School (Lexington, Kentucky) =

Coordinates: 38°04′12″N 84°30′22″W

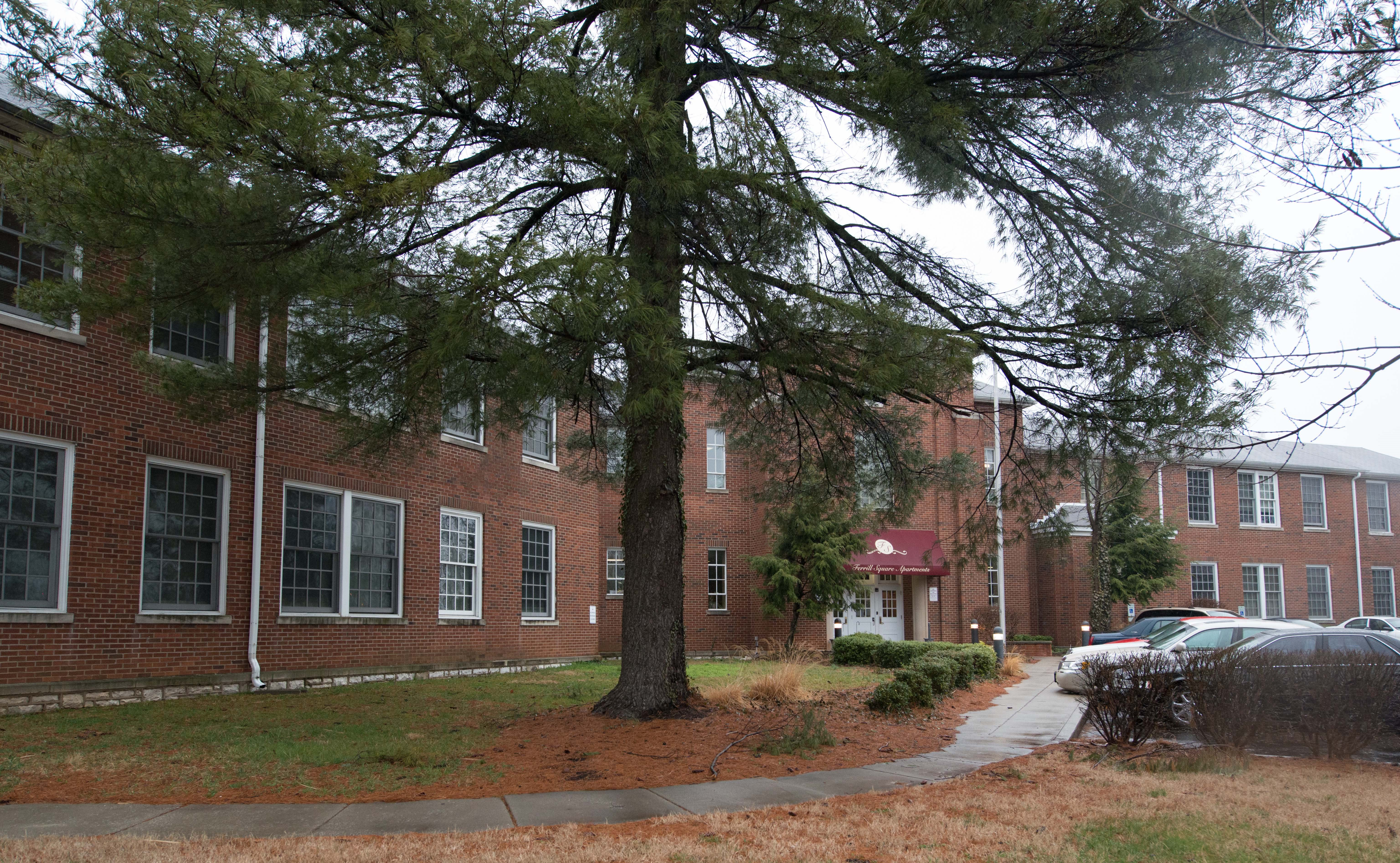
- Photo taken 17 March 2013

Location
- 465 Price Road; Lexington, Kentucky, 40508-1057

Information
- Opened: 1929
- Closed: 1971
- Grades: 1–12

Douglass School in Lexington, Kentucky, US, was both a primary and secondary Fayette County Public Schools from 1929 to 1971. Douglass School operated solely for African American students. The building that once housed Douglass School, located at 465 Price Road, was listed on the National Register of Historic Places in Fayette County in 1998.

== Origins ==
Douglass School, named for the abolitionist Frederick Douglass, opened in 1929. Built with funds from the Rosenwald Fund, the original eight room building cost $30,000 to build and was located at the corner of Chiles Avenue and Price Road.

From 1929 to 1936, the school housed grades 1–12. In 1931, Douglass School was the first all black county school in Kentucky to receive a Class A Rating. From 1936 to 1948, the school held grades 1–10. In 1951, the elementary school was moved to 465 Price Road to house grades 1–6 behind the high school building, designed by the architect John T. Gillig and built in 1947. By the time of the completion of this new high school, there were only 62 public high schools for black students in Kentucky, and only thirteen of these were, like the Douglass School, county facilities. In 1953, four new rooms were added, along with a new lunchroom, auditorium, library, band room and agricultural room.

An overheated furnace led to the destruction of one of the elementary school buildings in January 1955. Damages were estimated at $130,000 to $150,000. In 1963, grades 10–12 were transferred to Lafayette High School and Bryan Station High School. At the time of its closure in 1971, there were approximately 435 students in grades 1–6.

== Douglass student breaks school color barrier in Lexington ==
Inspired by the Brown v. Board of Education Supreme Court ruling, Helen Cary Caise age 16, between her sophomore and junior years of high school in 1955, enrolled in a summer course in U.S. History at Lafayette High School. She was the first black student at a white school in the county. The enrollment was approved by the superintendent at the time, N.C. Turpen. Wade later remembered, "I had no clue I was making history. I just thought I was doing what I had a right to do." She faced no direct attacks (her white classmates, she said, generally "just ignored me" and she befriended one girl, Barbara Levy), but she was escorted to class by uncles and her grandfather who feared for her safety. Meanwhile, her family received threatening phone calls and her father's concrete business was essentially lost due to the repercussions from white supremacists. She graduated from Douglass High school and went on to earn a teaching degree at Kentucky State University.

== Athletics ==
In February 1957, the Douglass Deamons competed in the first integrated basketball tournament in Lexington, Kentucky. It was the 43rd Fayette County Tournament. They were the first all black team to play, under the coaching of Charles Livisay.

== Notable alumni/ae and staff ==
- F.D. Talbert graduated from Douglass High School and was later a teacher and principal there.
- Frances A. Smallwood was the second African American nurse in the public health service. She was a school nurse at several schools in Fayette County, including Douglass High School.
- Loretta J. Clark graduated from Douglass High School and attended the University of Kentucky in Lexington, Kentucky. Clark was a teacher for thirty years, and worked as the Director of Minority Recruitment at the University of Kentucky.
- Virginia S. McDonald was the librarian at Douglass School for twenty-seven years.
- Viola J. Greene was a teacher in Lexington and Fayette County for forty-two years. She taught at Douglass School from 1952 to 1963.
- Lantis W. Stewart was a teacher in Lexington and Fayette County for twenty-one years. He taught at Douglass High School before he became the principal of Russell Cave Elementary School.
- Ronald Griffin graduated from Douglass High School and was in the United States Air Force for four years. He was active in the NAACP at Eastern Kentucky University, and was involved in many community outreach programs in Kentucky.
- Lillian Gillespie Delaney taught at Douglass School from 1947 to 1963, and was the first African American instructor at Tates Creek High School.
- Robert R. Jefferson graduated from Douglass High School and was Chairman of the Board of the Lexington Urban League.

== See also ==
- Cadentown School
- Paul Laurence Dunbar High School (Lexington, Kentucky)
- Russell School (Lexington, Kentucky)
- National Register of Historic Places listings in Fayette County, Kentucky
