= Botherum =

Historic house in Kentucky, United States

- U.S. National Register of Historic Places
- U.S. Historic district – Contributing property
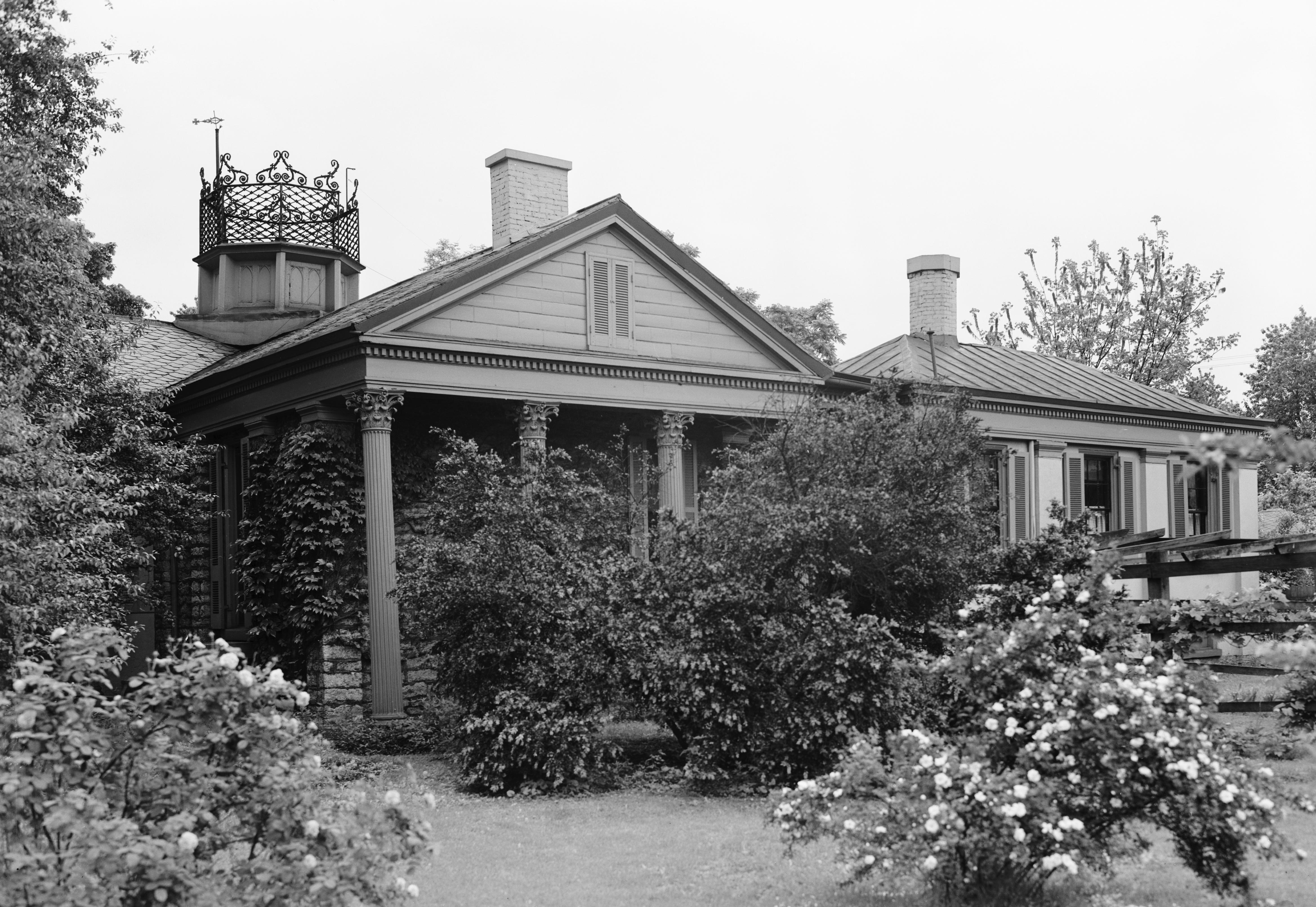

- Location within Kentucky Location within the United States
- Location: 341 Madison Pl., Lexington, Kentucky
- Coordinates: 38°2′59″N 84°30′26″W
- Area: 10 acres (4.0 ha)
- Built: 1850
- Architect: John McMurtry
- Architectural style: Classical Revival
- Part of: Woodward Heights Neighborhood Historic District (ID80001525)
- NRHP reference No.: 73000795

Significant dates
- Added to NRHP: March 7, 1973
- Designated CP: December 1, 1980

Botherum was built for Madison C. Johnson in 1850 or 1851 (sources vary) by John McMurtry, a well-known architect and builder based in Lexington. The house was intended, in part, as a shrine to Johnson's late wife Sally Ann, a sister of Cassius Marcellus Clay who died giving birth in 1828.

Although McMurtry was known for his Gothic Revival architecture, and is credited with establishing the popularity of that style in central Kentucky, Botherum shows an unusual combination of Greek, Roman, and Gothic architectural elements.

A large ginkgo tree that stands on the property is said to have been a gift to Johnson from Henry Clay. The original 36-acre estate faced High Street, but the house now sits on a 3/4 acre lot and is approached from Madison Place, to the side.

In 1886, Johnson's heirs sold the estate to J. C. Woodward, who subdivided much of it into Woodward Heights, selling the lots individually.

John Cavendish owned the house from 1983 until 2012, and in the mid-1980s he added a high stone wall that hides the single-story house from the street and a two-story guest house.

The home was featured in Southern Living magazine in 2017 and is described by Jon Carloftis.
