= Cadentown School =

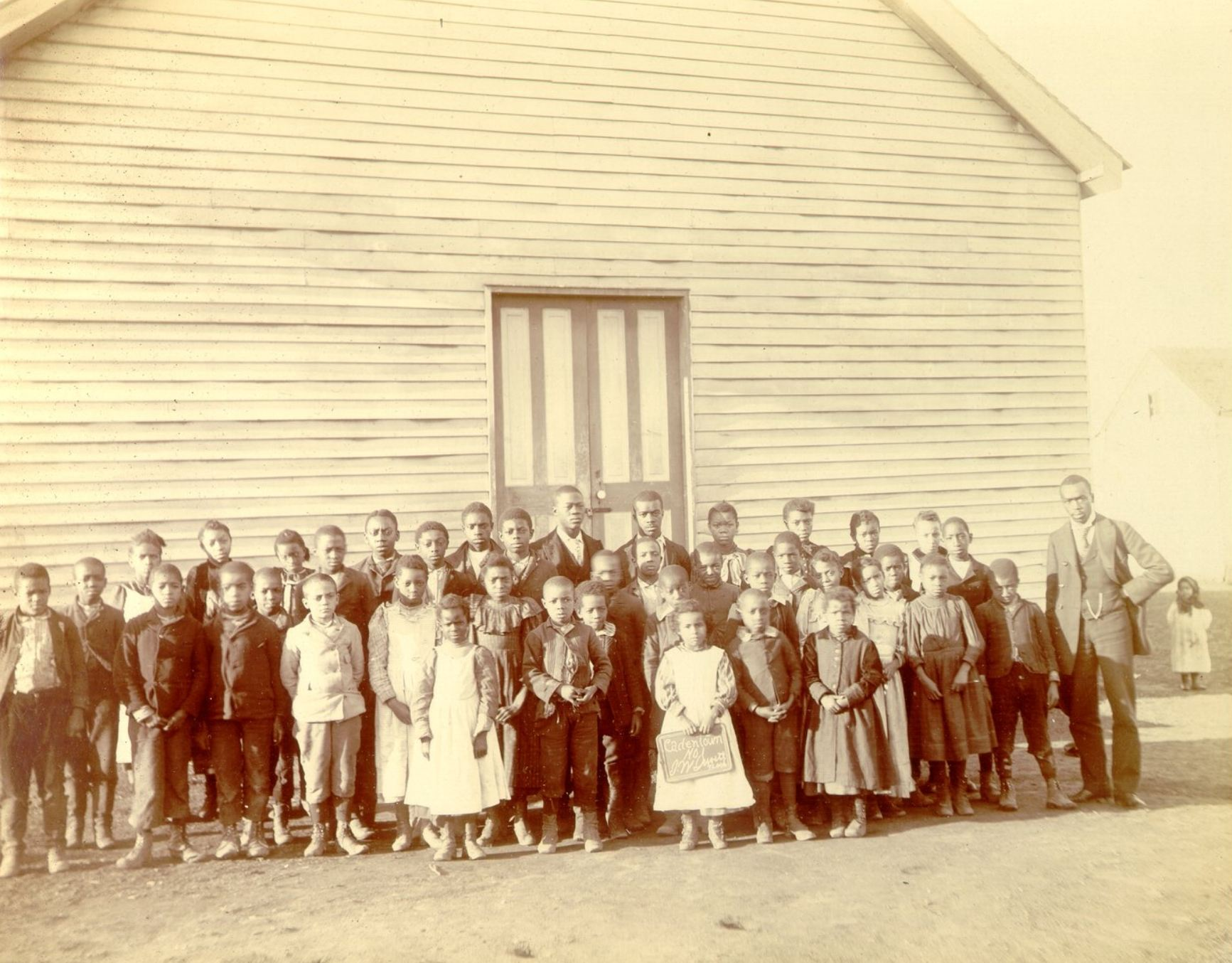
- Cadentown School, 1901 - slate reads "Caden town No1 JW Durett Teacher"

Location
- 705 Caden Lane; Lexington, Kentucky, 40509

Information
- Opened: circa 1879
- Closed: 1922
- Grades: 1–6

Cadentown School in Lexington, Kentucky was a primary public school for black children in the segregated Fayette County Public Schools from about 1879 to 1922. The building that originally housed Cadentown School, located at 705 Caden Lane, is no longer extant. However, the Rosenwald Fund School (built sometime between 1922 and 1923 in the same general area as the original school building) is listed on the National Register of Historic Places in Fayette County.

== Origins ==
The Cadentown School served as an important center for the Cadentown community, a small village situated on about forty acres of land in the eastern part of Fayette County, Kentucky. The village was created by an organized series of land lot purchases from a white farmowner Owen Caden who had purchased the land for the purposes of selling it in 1-8 acre lots to African-Americans and Civil War refugees seeking to start a new life. In addition to private homes, the community built public roadways and buildings, several of which are still standing today: two historic churches, a fraternal order lodge. The Cadentown Baptist Church was the first of the public buildings built by the community in 1879. The congregation offered a portion of its church lot for the construction of a school.

== Rural model school ==
By 1914 Kentucky hired five county supervisors, one of which was dedicated to Fayette County, to oversee the work being done in the segregated schools for African-Americans. In addition, Florence G. Anderson was hired to supervise homemaker clubwomen's activities and to develop more rigorous pedagogies in the domestic sciences for teachers in the county "colored schools." John Welden Jewett was a teacher at the Cadentown School during his early career.

In 1917 Julius Rosenwald organized the Rosenwald Fund to donate matching funds for the construction of rural model schools for African-Americans. Fayette County and its residents found he required matching funds for the construction of five schools (Uttingertown, Coletown, Avon, Ft. Springs and Douglass School) and one shop (an addition to the Douglass School). Of these six structures, Cadentown School is the only surviving Rosenwald Fund School in Fayette County.

The one-teacher community school at Cadentown was built from the plans prepared by the Frankel-Curtis Company, Architects and Engineers of Lexington, Kentucky. Its construction cost $3,000 of which only $500 came from the Rosenwald Fund. When it was completed, the new school opened in 1923 and served the local community until its closure at the end of the school year in 1947. The Cadentown Baptist Church continued to use the school building as an activity center, but when the church moved to a new location in the community, the property and buildings were sold to a private owner.

== Structure ==
The Rosenwald funded Cadentown School is a one-story frame structure that is rectangular in plan: approximate 22 feet wide and 43 feet deep. The building has a southeast–northwest orientation with a simple gable roof (shingled) and a foundational grid of 15" x 15" concrete piers hidden with a skirt of vertical wood boards. The building is divided into five main spaces:

- the entrance vestibule
- two cloak rooms on either side of the entrance vestibule with single doors into each of these small rooms from the main classroom
- the main classroom (roughly 21 feet wide by 29 feet deep) with a brick flue located in the north corner to allow for a small heating stove (now gone); also, originally, two large blackboards were mounted on the northeast and northwest walls (the northeast wall's blackboard is now missing)
- the domestic science room is accessible from a single door on the northwest wall of the main classroom and runs the full width of the rear of the school building; the brick flue originally also allowed for the installation of a cook stove for this smaller room

All the walls and ceilings of the interior were sheathed with narrow beaded board. The large, oversized windows allowed the two instructional rooms to take advantage of natural lighting.

== Later status ==
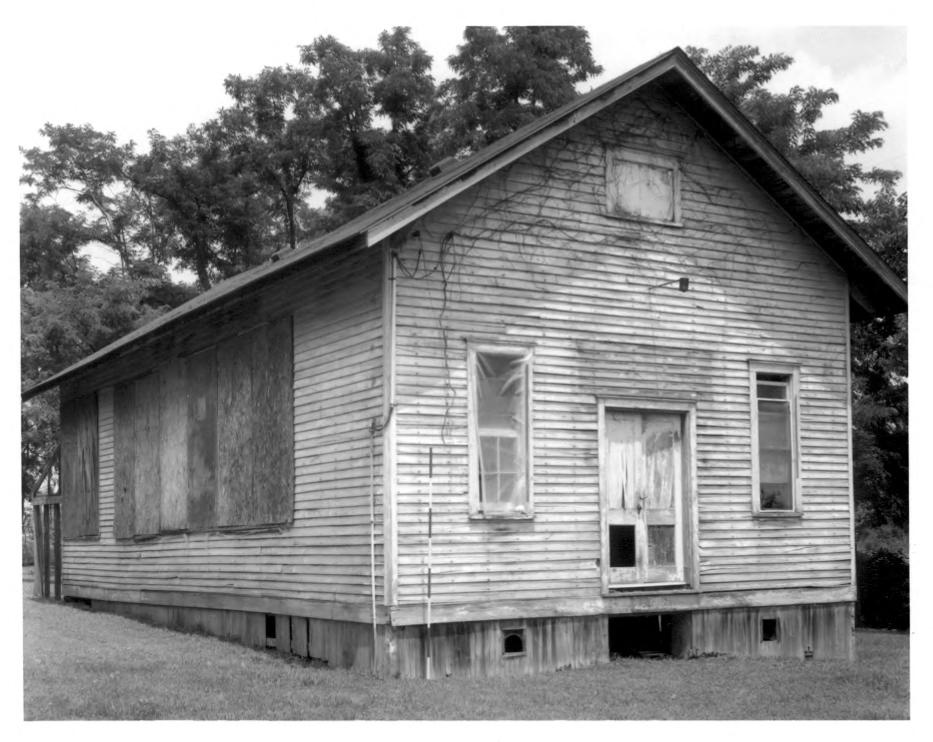
Photo by Dean A. Doerrfeld or Rebecca G. Rapier in 2004 of the Cadentown Rosenwald School, Caden Lane, Lexington, Fayette County, KY as part of an effort to place this Rosenwald School on the National Register of Historic Places (completed 2006)

As of 2001, the Cadentown Neighborhood Association had been working to preserve the property. The latest private owner of the property refused to sell it or to restore the crumbling structure. Around 2005, the Lexington-Fayette Urban County Government acquired the property and planned to renovate the structure.

== See also ==
- Day Law
- National Register of Historic Places listings in Fayette County, Kentucky
- Rosenwald Schools
