= John Welden Jewett =

American teacher (1870–1905)

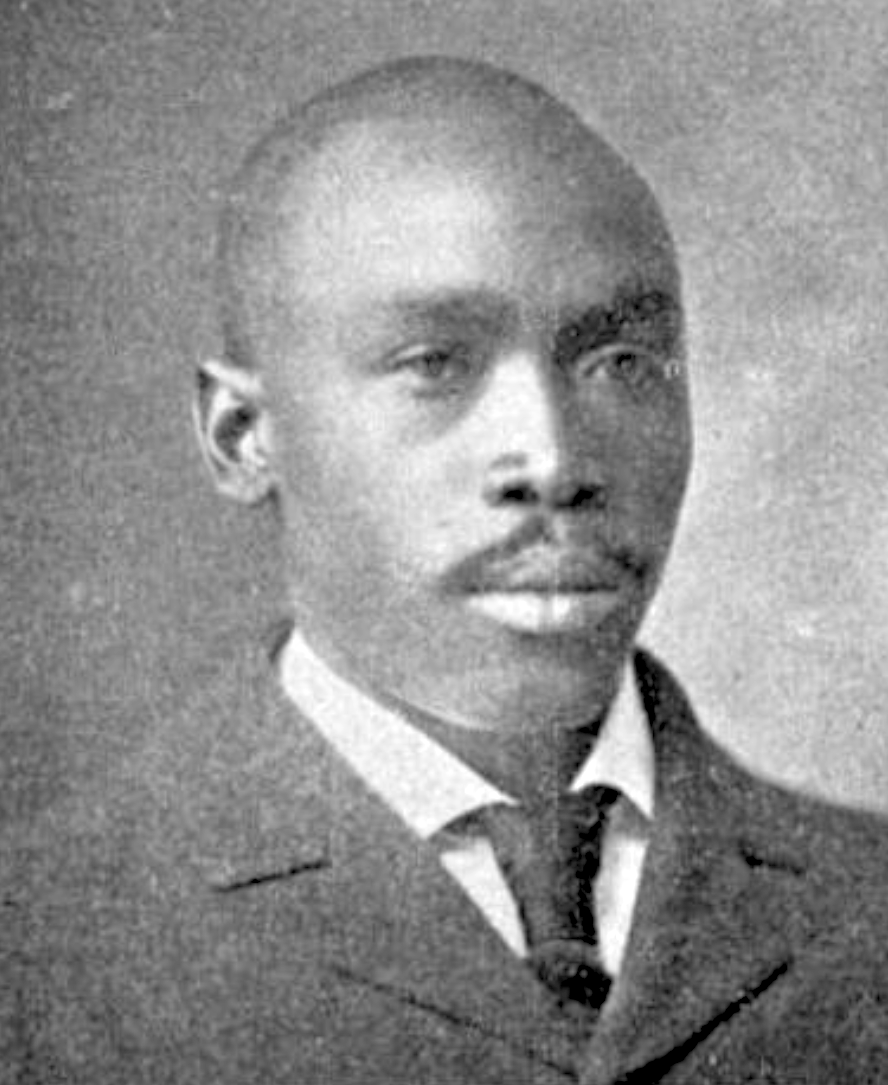
- Born: March 4, 1870; Fayette County, Kentucky, U.S.
- Died: June 8, 1905 (aged 35); Lexington, Kentucky, U.S.
- Burial place: African Cemetery No. 2, Lexington, Kentucky
- Other names: John Weldon Jewett, J.W. Jewett
- Occupations: Teacher, civil servant, columnist, community leader
- Political party: Republican
- Spouse: Louise C. Miller (m. 1902)
- Children: 1

John Welden Jewett (March 4, 1870 – June 8, 1905) American educator, civil servant, columnist and community leader. He served as the president of the Fayette County Teachers' Association; and was later appointed to the Internal Revenue Service.

== Life and career ==
John W. Jewett was born on March 4, 1870, in Fayette County near Lexington, Kentucky, he was the son of Sarah Henderson and Henry Jewett. The family moved to Covington, Kentucky, where he attended school. He graduated in 1883 from Gaines High School in Cincinnati, Ohio.

Jewett began his teaching career in 1890 at the Cadentown School in Cadentown, Kentucky, a former Fayette County community on the eastern edge of the city of Lexington. He served as the president of the Fayette County Teachers' Association.

Jewett was a Republican delegate to Kentucky State Conventions. He was a Chancellor Commander of the Bluegrass Lodge No. 11, Knights of Pythias; and a member of the Frederick Douglass Club of Lexington. He also wrote a column in The Kentucky Leader newspaper in Lexington, and was the first Black columnist. Jewett would often sign his name with “Weldon” or “Welden” or “JW.”

He was married in 1902 to Louise C. Miller, and together they had one son who died 5 months after his birth.

Jewett died a few months later of tubercular meningitis on June 8, 1905, and the funeral services were held at the Main Street Baptist Church in Lexington. He is interred at African Cemetery No. 2.
