= John McMurtry (architect) =

American architect (1812–1890)

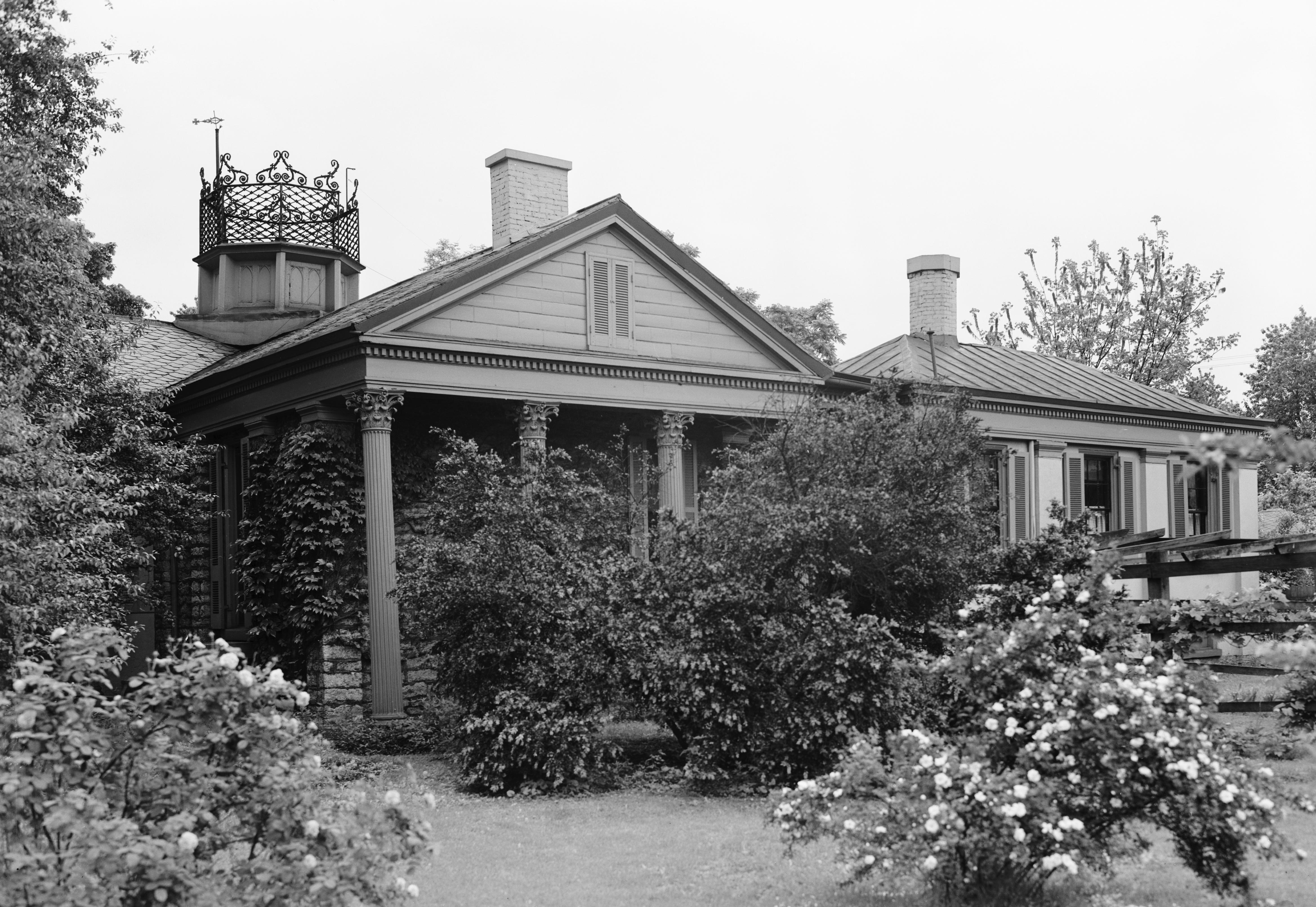
Botherum, 1850

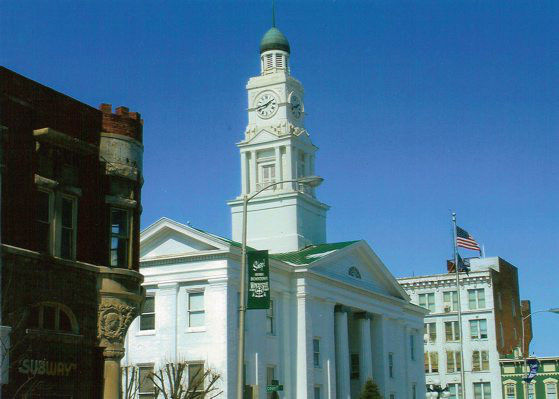
Clark County Courthouse, 1855

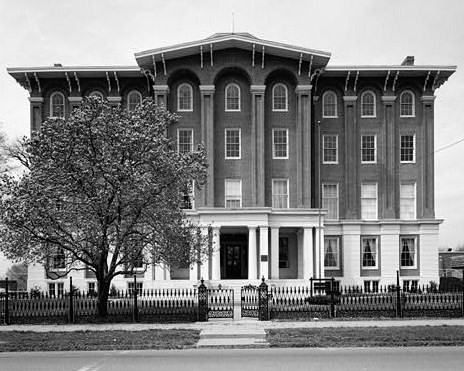
Jacobs Hall, Kentucky School for the Deaf

John McMurtry (September 13, 1812 – March 3, 1890) was a 19th-century American builder and architect who worked in Lexington, Kentucky designing a number of notable buildings, several of which are listed on the National Register of Historic Places.

According to Clay Lancaster, McMurtry is the "man whose work is most representative of the nineteenth century architecture of central Kentucky", and among his works are some "meriting careful consideration".

McMurtry "produced" (as architect and/or builder) more than 200 buildings in the Bluegrass area of Kentucky, and is credited for the popularity of Gothic Revival architecture in the Bluegrass area, as exemplified by Loudoun House (built by McMurtry; designed by nationally renowned architect Alexander Jackson Davis.

Some of McMurtry's notable building and architectural projects include:

- T. D. Basye House, 3501 Georgetown Rd., Lexington, Kentucky (McMurtry, John), NRHP-listed
- Botherum, (1850), 341 Madison Pl., Lexington, Kentucky (McMurtry, John), NRHP-listed
- Buenna Hill, also known as Cythiana Hall, Greek Revival off Ferguson Rd., Lexington, Kentucky (McMurtry, John), NRHP-listed
- Christ Church Episcopal, Church and Market Sts., Lexington, Kentucky (McMurtry, John), NRHP-listed
- Clark County Court House, (1855), Main St., Winchester, Kentucky (McMurtry, John), NRHP-listed
- Elley Villa, 320 Linden Walk, Lexington, Kentucky (McMurtry, John), NRHP-listed
- Episcopal Burying Ground Chapel, Lexington, Kentucky, contributing item in NRHP listing
- Fairlawn, 6 mi. NE of Lexington on U.S. 68, Lexington, Kentucky (McMurtry, John), NRHP-listed
- Floral Hall, 847 S. Broadway, Lexington, Kentucky (McMurtry, John), NRHP-listed
- Higgins Block, 145–151 W. Main St., Lexington, Kentucky, (McMurtry, John), NRHP-listed
- Jacobs Hall, Kentucky School for the Deaf, S. 3rd St., Danville, Kentucky (McMurtry, John), NRHP-listed
- Thomas January House, 437 W. 2nd St., Lexington, Kentucky (McMurtry, John), NRHP-listed
- Lexington Cemetery entrance gates
- Loudoun House, (1851) corner of Bryan Avenue and Castlewood Drive, Lexington, Kentucky, NRHP-listed.
- Benjamin McCann House, Old Richmond Pike, Lexington, Kentucky (McMurtry, John), NRHP-listed
- McFarland House, 510 Fountain Ave., Georgetown, Kentucky (McMurtry, John), NRHP-listed
- Paris Cemetery Gatehouse, U.S. 68, Paris, Kentucky (McMurtry, John), NRHP-listed
- Levi Prewitt House, S of Georgetown off I-64, Georgetown, Kentucky, (McMurtry, John), NRHP-listed
- Sayre Female Institute, 194 N. Limestone St., Lexington, Kentucky, (McMurtry, John), NRHP-listed
- Thomas B. Watkins House, 1008 S. Broadway, Lexington, Kentucky (McMurtry, John), NRHP-listed
- Worley, Allen, and Foushee Houses, 355, 361, and 367 S. Broadway, Lexington, Kentucky (McMurtry, John), NRHP-listed

== See also ==
- Thomas Kennedy House, Eastern Ave. at E. Main St., Carlisle, Kentucky (McMurtry, Thomas), NRHP-listed
