= Liggett and Myers Harpring Tobacco Storage Warehouse =

Tobacco storage warehouse in Kentucky, United States

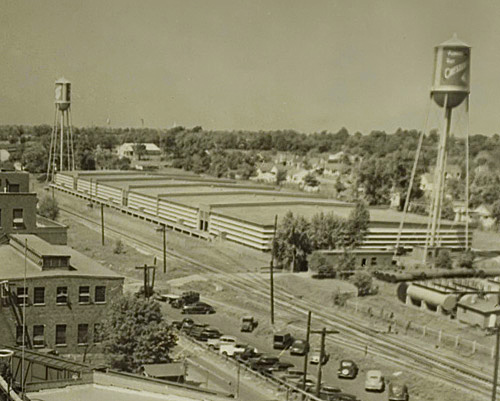
- The Liggett and Myers Harpring Tobacco Storage Warehouse in 1930.
- Interactive map of the Liggett and Myers Harpring Tobacco Storage Warehouse area

General information
- Status: Used as a retail location
- Type: Tobacco Storage Warehouse
- Architectural style: Industrial architecture
- Location: 1211 Manchester Street, Lexington, Kentucky, United States
- Current tenants: Teak Closeouts, Kentucky Tile Closeouts and Angliana Cabinets
- Construction started: 1930
- Completed: 1930
- Client: Liggett and Myers
- Owner: L&M Harpring Warehouse, LLC

Design and construction
- Architect: James D. Harper
- Architecture firm: Harper
- Liggett and Myers Harpring Tobacco Storage Warehouse
- U.S. National Register of Historic Places
- Location within Kentucky Location within the United States
- Coordinates: 38°03′05″N 84°30′10″W
- Architect: James D. Harper
- NRHP reference No.: 13000110
- Added to NRHP: March 27, 2013

The Liggett and Myers Harpring Tobacco Storage Warehouse (built in 1930) is a building located in Lexington, Kentucky. The building is significant for its association with the burley tobacco industry in Lexington, Kentucky between 1930 and 1980 and is currently listed on the National Register of Historic Places listings in Fayette County, Kentucky.

== History ==
After the end of World War I, Lexington positioned itself as the largest burley tobacco market in the state, a position that was strengthened by its increase in the number of tobacco warehouse being built across the city. This new surge in the consumption of burley tobacco is what drove Liggett and Myers to build a new tobacco facility in Lexington in 1930. A newspaper article announcing the construction of the $100,000 warehouse stated that Liggett and Myers plan "to use the warehouse as a storage plant for tobacco here and awaiting shipment to their factories. The new warehouse will be completed and put into use by the opening of the tobacco season here this winter".

The warehouse, located along Manchester Street and the L&N Railroad, was named for Liggett and Myers' head buyer in Kentucky, F. G. Harpring of Louisville. The new warehouse joined a line of other tobacco-related structures in Lexington's northwest tobacco district.

A November 1930 article in the Lexington Leader touted the scope and scale of the Harpring Storage Warehouse. "One of the largest and finest roofing and sheet metal jobs ever done in this part of the country is now being completed by the James D. Harper firm, 724 West Short Street, on the new Liggett and Myers tobacco warehouse on the Old Frankfort Pike." The article detailed the amount of metal used, which given the size of the warehouse, is impressive: "1 ,200 squares of Baird’s Specification roofing; 1,900 lineal feet of Baird’s flashing; 1,200 lineal feet of molded gutters; 600 feet of downspout; 300 feet of corrugated iron siding and 150 squares of screen wire." The Harpring Storage Warehouse represented a major financial investment on the part of Liggett and Myers. The warehouse cost $100,000 to build.

Between 1930 and the start of World War II, the urban tobacco landscape in Lexington grew dramatically. The consolidation in the tobacco markets meant that Lexington, a rail and road hub, benefited from a building boom of new, mostly metal-clad warehouses. This includes both sales and storage warehouses. The introduction of the metal-clad steel-frame brick-firewall storage warehouse with multiple sections under one roof, rippled throughout Lexington's burley storage landscape. The Harpring Warehouse began receiving tobacco during the 1930 sales season, and its design was quickly co-opted by other companies. In 1931, other national tobacco firms commenced building similar storage warehouses.

The Harpring Storage Warehouse was built at a pivotal time for Liggett and Myers, at least in terms of burley tobacco production. The burley tobacco market brought in more than $17 million in 1930, a year when the volume of burley at local warehouses shattered all records. Twenty sales warehouses in Lexington contained more than 9 million pounds of tobacco, while "another million were on wagons and trucks on streets, unable to find room in the warehouses." The impacts on the local economy were noticeable. Beyond the men who worked in the warehouses, and the growers themselves, Lexington's businesses prospered during the winter months of selling. The warehouse itself was one of the first concrete floor tobacco warehouses in Kentucky and was considered to be the "gold standard" by which other tobacco warehouses were measured. In December 1931, the Lexington Leader carried a story about the spike in automobile sales during the sales season. Local car dealers reported an increase in both new and used-car sales, and the buyers came from far and wide, with at least one out-of-state grower buying a new car with his proceeds from selling his tobacco at the Lexington warehouses.

The tobacco warehouses of Lexington, however, fell mostly silent during World War II. Labor shortages translated into a sharp drop in tobacco production, and many warehouses in urban areas underwent transformation into storage for war supplies. E.J. O'Brien and Company, which had are-drying and re-handling facility and a hogshead tobacco warehouse at the corner of South Broadway and Virginia Avenue, underwent a conversion to manufacturing parachutes during World War II.

Throughout the 1960s; parades were held to celebrate the role of burley tobacco in the local economy, and the sales warehouse was a busy and festive place to be from Thanksgiving through January. Lexington's population increased during the sales season and local businesses benefitted from the influx of growers with ready cash, warehouse operators seeking to form new relationships, and buyers flocking to town to get the most leaf tor the best price.

The forces which allowed Lexington to rise to such heights within the burley tobacco industry contributed to the town's gradual demise as a tobacco center in the late 1970s. During that decade and into the 1980s, tobacco companies nationally began "merging small tobacco facilities to form more modem facilities in central locations." Liggett and Myers was the first national tobacco company to leave Lexington in the late 1970s. According to Rogers' nomination, the Liggett and Myers Tobacco Re-handling Plant on Bolivar closed in the 1960s. The company sold the building to a private individual in 1973.

Lorillard announced closure of its storage warehouses in Lexington in 1983, intending to consolidate with facilities in Danville, Virginia and Lancaster, Pennsylvania. Brown and Williamson left Lexington in 1984, when it consolidated its Lexington operations and moved them to North Carolina.

From 1980 to 2007, the warehouse was primarily used as general storage. In 2007, the warehouse was purchased and used as an antique mall until 2011. In December 2012, the building was purchased at auction by Kevin McCloud. The two current tenants are Teak Closeouts and Cabinet Kings.

The building was added to the National Register of Historic Places listings in Fayette County, Kentucky on March 27, 2013.

== Description ==
The Harpring Warehouse is a steel-frame metal-clad on a poured concrete floor rectangular storage warehouse, with space for over 20,000 hogsheads of tobacco and the current condition of the site has not changed much since the original building was completed, though the two water towers once located on either end of the warehouse are gone. The gable roof, originally clad in a wood sheathing and built-up tar, peaks at 25 feet at the ridgeline, and 18 feet high along the sides. The ceiling inside the warehouse is tongue and groove wood boards.

The facade of the warehouse faces east, and the current owner commissioned a local artist to paint a mural on the metal siding on that end. A small shed addition juts out from the east elevation; this was presumably built at a later date to accommodate administrative needs. On the north side of this addition are three garage bays with metal rolling doors. The first door features a drive-up ramp so that trucks could enter the warehouse, while the two subsequent doors are designed for loading and unloading with no ramp.

Three of the five brick firewalls feature a brick face pierced by two sliding doors; the doors lead into the warehouse space on either side of the firewall. The brick elevation has a parapet wall topped with metal coping. Beneath the parapet and above each sliding door is a brick inset that contains fiberglass for a transom-like effect. On the north elevation, each entryway is accessed by an elevated platform covered with a shed roof. The west elevation, leading into section six of the warehouse, has one garage bay entrance. This section is built at an angle so trucks could drive directly into the warehouse.

On the south elevation, a later elevated walkway system connects the three sets of entryways. The south elevation of the warehouse features six shed-roofed extensions from the main wall that contain elements of the original sprinkler system. These small additions are constructed of brick with poured concrete tops, and sheathed in corrugated metal like the warehouse. On either side of the warehouse, are three fire hydrants.

The two water towers were removed sometime before the 1980s. Remnants of the concrete that once held the mighty supports can still be seen. The water towers were installed to support the fire sprinkler suppression system.

=== Interior ===
The Harpring Storage Warehouse features a steel frame and poured concrete floor. The steel supports provide a very open floor plan, ideal for the storage of thousands of hogsheads. Each section is 190 feet long and 110 feet wide. In some of the warehouse sections, the corrugated metal siding has been sprayed with insulation. Sections of walls feature fiberglass instead of metal cladding; this additional light complemented the skylights present in each section. Five of the warehouse sections contain four large skylights each. A one-story, shed roofed detached brick boiler room is located at the west end of the warehouse and on the east side of the warehouse, the property features a freestanding 1000 square foot building used as a former guard house. This building housed two full-time security guards. The guard house is made exclusively of brick and a concrete ceiling/roof.

The boiler was originally coal fired and the concrete floor of the warehouse is supposed to have a form of radiant heat. The boiler is non-operational today.
