= Fayette National Bank Building =

- U.S. National Register of Historic Places
- U.S. Historic district – Contributing property
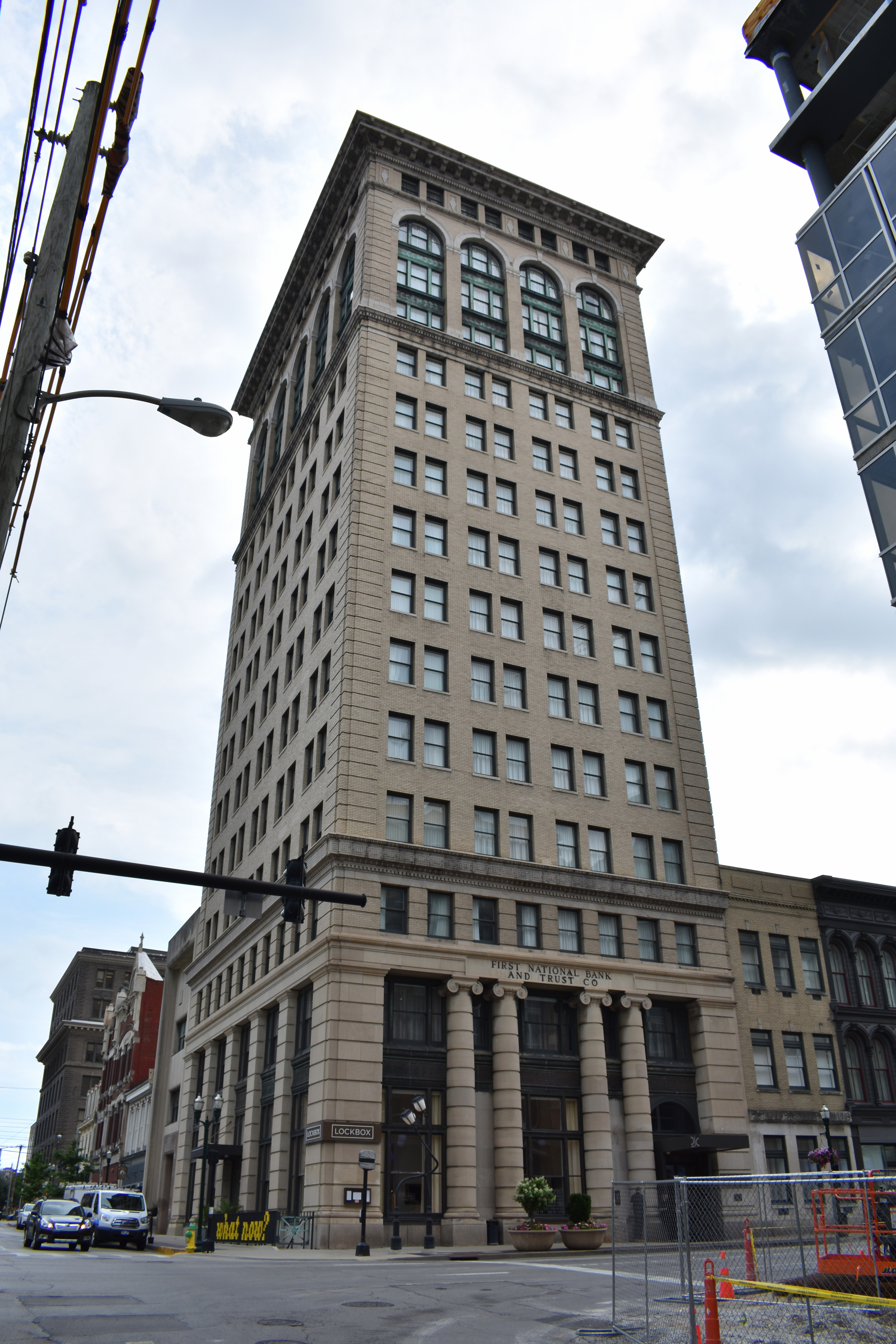

- Location within Kentucky Location within the United States
- Location: 167 W. Main St., Lexington, Kentucky
- Coordinates: 38°2′50″N 84°29′53″W
- Built: 1913-1914
- Built by: George A. Fuller Company
- Architect: McKim, Mead & White
- Architectural style: Beaux Arts
- Part of: Downtown Commercial District (ID83000559)
- NRHP reference No.: 80001513

Significant dates
- Added to NRHP: February 27, 1980
- Designated CP: August 25, 1983

The Fayette National Bank Building, also known as the First National Bank Building or 21C Museum Hotel Lexington, is a historic 15-story high-rise in Lexington, Kentucky. The building was designed by the prominent architecture firm McKim, Mead & White and built by the George A. Fuller Company from 1913 to 1914. It was added to the National Register of Historic Places on February 27, 1980.

In 2016, the building was converted into a 21c Museum Hotel. The building was reconfigured into 88 hotel rooms, a restaurant and museum space. Renovations were expected to cost in excess of $43 million. The hotel opened in February 2016. It was then inducted into Historic Hotels of America, the official program of the National Trust for Historic Preservation, in 2019.

== See also ==
- Higgins Block (Lexington, Kentucky), an adjacent building
- National Register of Historic Places listings in Fayette County, Kentucky
