= Kentucky School for the Deaf =

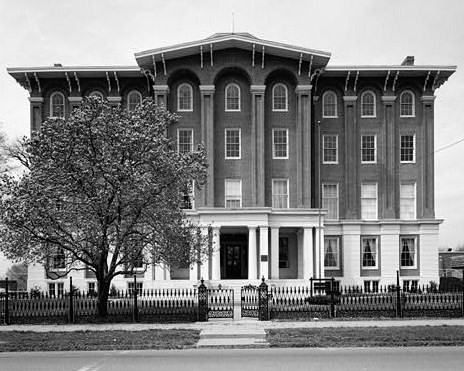
- Jacobs Hall, A National Historic Landmark in 1987
- 303 S. 2nd St., Danville, Kentucky

Information
- Type: Public
- Established: April 10, 1823; 203 years ago
- School district: Office of Special Education and Early Learning
- Principal: Dr. Lynn Petrey
- Faculty: 120
- Grades: Preschool – 12
- Colors: Green and white
- Mascot: Colonels
- Website: www.ksd.kyschools.us

- Jacobs Hall, Kentucky School for the Deaf
- U.S. National Register of Historic Places
- U.S. National Historic Landmark
- Location within Kentucky Location within the United States
- Location: Danville, Kentucky
- Coordinates: 37°38′29″N 84°46′18″W
- Area: less than one acre (landmarked area)
- Built: 1857
- Architect: Thomas Lewinski, John McMurtry
- NRHP reference No.: 66000354
- Added to NRHP: October 15, 1966

The Kentucky School for the Deaf (KSD), located in Danville, Kentucky, United States, is a school that provides education to deaf and hard-of-hearing children from elementary through high school levels. Founded in 1823, it was the first school for the deaf west of the Allegheny Mountains. Jacobs Hall, its oldest surviving building (built 1857), was designated a National Historic Landmark in recognition of this history.

== History ==
KSD was established as the Kentucky Asylum for the Tuition of the Deaf and Dumb on April 10, 1823. It was the first state-supported school of its kind in the United States and the first school for the deaf west of the Allegheny Mountains. The deaf were a special concern of General Elias Barbee, a Kentucky state senator, whose daughter was deaf. In 1822, Barbee and John Rowan wrote legislation authorizing the creation of the school. On December 7, 1822, it was signed into law by Kentucky Governor John Adair. With the help of Henry Clay, KSD received two federal land grants in 1826 and 1836. This land in Florida and Arkansas was eventually sold to finance the construction of school facilities.

In the early years it was thought that the Kentucky school might be able to meet the educational needs of all deaf people in the southern and western United States. Pupils from all the southern states except Florida, and from as far away as Montana, attended KSD. Eventually, other states established their own schools for deaf students.

== Governance ==
The Centre College Board of Trustees operated the school until 1870. It was then governed by its own board of commissioners. Since 1960, the Kentucky Board of Education and Department of Education have governed the school.

Many of the officers and teachers at KSD have had long tenures. George M. McClure was associated with the school for eighty years as both pupil and teacher. The school has had fourteen superintendents since its inception. The Rev. John Rice Kerr, the first superintendent, and John Adamson Jacobs, the third superintendent, are credited with nurturing the school from its infancy. Jacobs began his work in 1825, became superintendent in 1835, and held that office until his death in 1869.

== Facilities ==
KSD lies on 166 acres (67 ha) near the center of Danville. Buildings on the campus are listed below. It has been proposed that the campus be reduced to 50 acres (20 ha), demolishing or selling several of the buildings.

- Argo-McClure Hall (1964) – technology classes for elementary, middle and high school
- Barbee Hall (1966) – currently empty middle school girls' dormitory
- Beauchamp Hall (1966) – currently empty middle school boys' dormitory
- Brady Hall (1981) – middle school boys' & middle school girls' dormitory and offices
- Bruce Hall (1966) – currently empty middle school girls' dormitory
- Fosdick Hall (1966) – currently using for maintenance department
- Grow Hall (1968) – food service and cafeteria
- Jacobs Hall (1857) – KSD's oldest surviving building; it is listed as a National Historic Landmark and contains a re-creation of a student dormitory and classroom from the 1850s
- Kerr Hall (1976) – high school, middle school and offices
- Lee Hall (1958) – formerly used as girls' vocational classes and middle school classes
- Marshall Hall (2019) – new elementary school, elementary boys' and girls' dormitory and cafeteria (opens in August 2019)
- Middleton Hall (1979) – high school girls' and high boys' dormitory and offices
- Thomas Hall (1973) – gymnasium, student grille, swimming pool, and athletic offices
- Walker Hall (1971) – formerly used as elementary school and elementary boys' and girls' dormitory. Razed in 2021.

== Master plan ==
A task force was established in 2004 to create a master plan for KSD. They recommended:

- Reducing the number of buildings from 17 to 7:
  - The new campus would contain Argo-McClure, Brady, Jacobs, Kerr, Middleton, and Thomas halls, and a new elementary school to be built at a cost of $6.5 million.
  - Demolishing Beauchamp, Fosdick, and Grow halls.
  - Campus buildings outside the master plan area were Barbee, Bruce, Lee, Rogers, and Walker halls, the laundry and power plant, and the engineer's residence.
- Reducing the land from 170 acres (0.69 km^{2}) to 62 acres (0.25 km^{2}).
- Selling land outside the master plan area, and using the proceeds to fund future campus needs.

== Athletics ==
The school's mascot is the Colonel. Athletic teams have enjoyed moderate success. They have won at least one high school eight-man football championship in fall 1999. In 2007, they won the National Boys Soccer Championship and became a 12th Region contender in boys' basketball. KSD currently participates in the following sports:

- Volleyball
- Girls' cross country
- Boys' cross country
- Girls' basketball
- Boys' basketball
- Track and field
