= Hurricane Hall =

Historic house in Kentucky, United States

- U.S. National Register of Historic Places
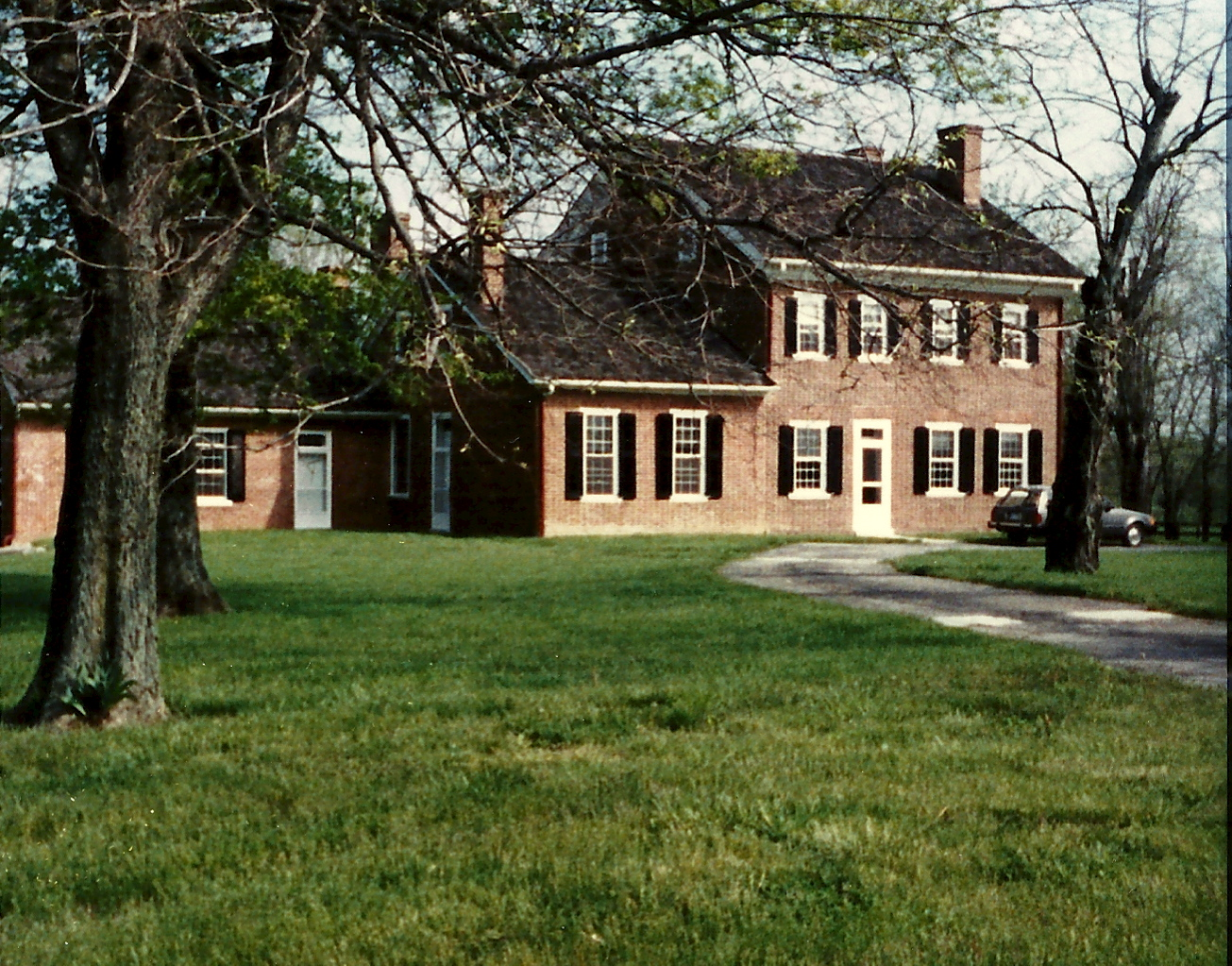

- Location within Kentucky Location within the United States
- Nearest city: Lexington, Kentucky
- Coordinates: 38°8′9″N 84°32′11″W
- Area: 9 acres (3.6 ha)
- Built: 1794
- NRHP reference No.: 76000871
- Added to NRHP: April 22, 1976

Hurricane Hall was built in the 1790s in Fayette County, Kentucky by David Laughed on the Lexington-Georgetown Pike in what is now a part of Lexington. Architecture historian Clay Lancaster describes it as "the most engaging residence in Fayette County". The home is included in the National Register of Historic Places listings in Fayette County, Kentucky.

It was purchased in 1803 by Colonel Roger Quarles. Quarles with his wife, Jane Rodes Thomson Quarles and their two children came from Virginia. Colonel Quarles was a gentleman farmer. The Fayette County Kentucky tax list in 1826 listed 1,563 acres (633 ha), 30 slaves, 33 horses and 1 pleasure carriage.

The front door opens into a 15-foot-wide hall (4.6 m). Notable decorative features were the French scenic wallpaper in the parlor and hallway, installed to commemorate the wedding of the Quarles' daughter, Sarah Anna Eliza Quarles to William Z. Thomson in 1817. The wallpaper was later taken down, with snippets of the wallpaper becoming framed and hung in the parlor.

Quarles Grandson, Patrick Henry Thomson inherited the house in 1856. P. H. Thomson maintained a private school on the estate. The Thomsons had 12 children, and it is said the children ran through the house like a hurricane. Hence, the name Hurricane Hall.

The home remained in the Quarles-Thomson family until 1962. It is now a thoroughbred breeding operation within what is now Lexington.

== Other sources ==
- Simpson, Elizabeth N., Bluegrass Houses And Their Traditions, Transylvania Press, 1932.
- Connally, William Elsey and Coulter E.M.. PhD, History of Kentucky, American Historical Society, Volume 4.
- History of Fayette County Kentucky, page 526
