= Boone Creek Rural Historic District =

- U.S. National Register of Historic Places
- Location within Kentucky Location within the United States
- Nearest city: Lexington, Kentucky
- Coordinates: 37°55′02″N 84°19′36″W
- Area: 4,060 acres (16.4 km^{2})
- Architectural style: Federal
- NRHP reference No.: 94000839
- Added to NRHP: August 19, 1994

Boone Creek Rural Historic District, about 11 miles southeast of Lexington, Kentucky, is a 4,060 acres (16.4 km^{2}) historic district which was listed on the National Register of Historic Places in 1994. It included 88 contributing buildings, 55 contributing structures, and 25 contributing sites.

The district spans the border between western Clark County and eastern Fayette County. It is roughly bounded by Interstate 75, Cleveland Rd., Athens-Boonesboro Rd. and Grimes Rd.

It includes three places already separately listed on the National Register:

- Cleveland-Rogers House
- Grimes House and Mill Complex
- James Pettit's Mill

It is described in its NRHP nomination as "a distinctive blend of natural and human-made landscapes which reflects a different development pattern from that found in other sections of Fayette County. The district includes a density of historic farmsteads and early-to-late-nineteenth century features whose spatial organization is very influenced by the desiccated landforms around it. This contrasts with the rest of rural Fayette County, which has been more intensively developed, especially for horse farms, and is much more regular topographically. The quality of the Boone Creek Rural Historic District is still good despite the number of buildings considered non-contributing by virtue of their modern construction dates. Of the non-contributing buildings, 38 are modern barns and 45 are modern dwellings. The new development in the district tends to perpetuate the traditional patterns in land use, choice of building sites, and scale."
