= John Burrier House =

Historic house in Kentucky, United States

- U.S. National Register of Historic Places
- Location within Kentucky Location within the United States
- Location: Kentucky Route 1966, Lexington, Kentucky
- Coordinates: 38°00′47″N 84°37′14″W
- Area: less than one acre
- Architectural style: Federal
- MPS: Early Stone Buildings of Central Kentucky TR
- NRHP reference No.: 83002759
- Added to NRHP: June 23, 1983

The John Burrier House, on Kentucky Route 1966 in what is now Lexington, Kentucky, was listed on the National Register of Historic Places in 1983.

It is a one-story three-bay dry stone wing of a former two-story house. It is also known as the Stone Grange and as Burrier Place.
