= Higgins Block (Lexington, Kentucky) =

Commercial building in Kentucky, US

- U.S. National Register of Historic Places
- U.S. Historic district – Contributing property
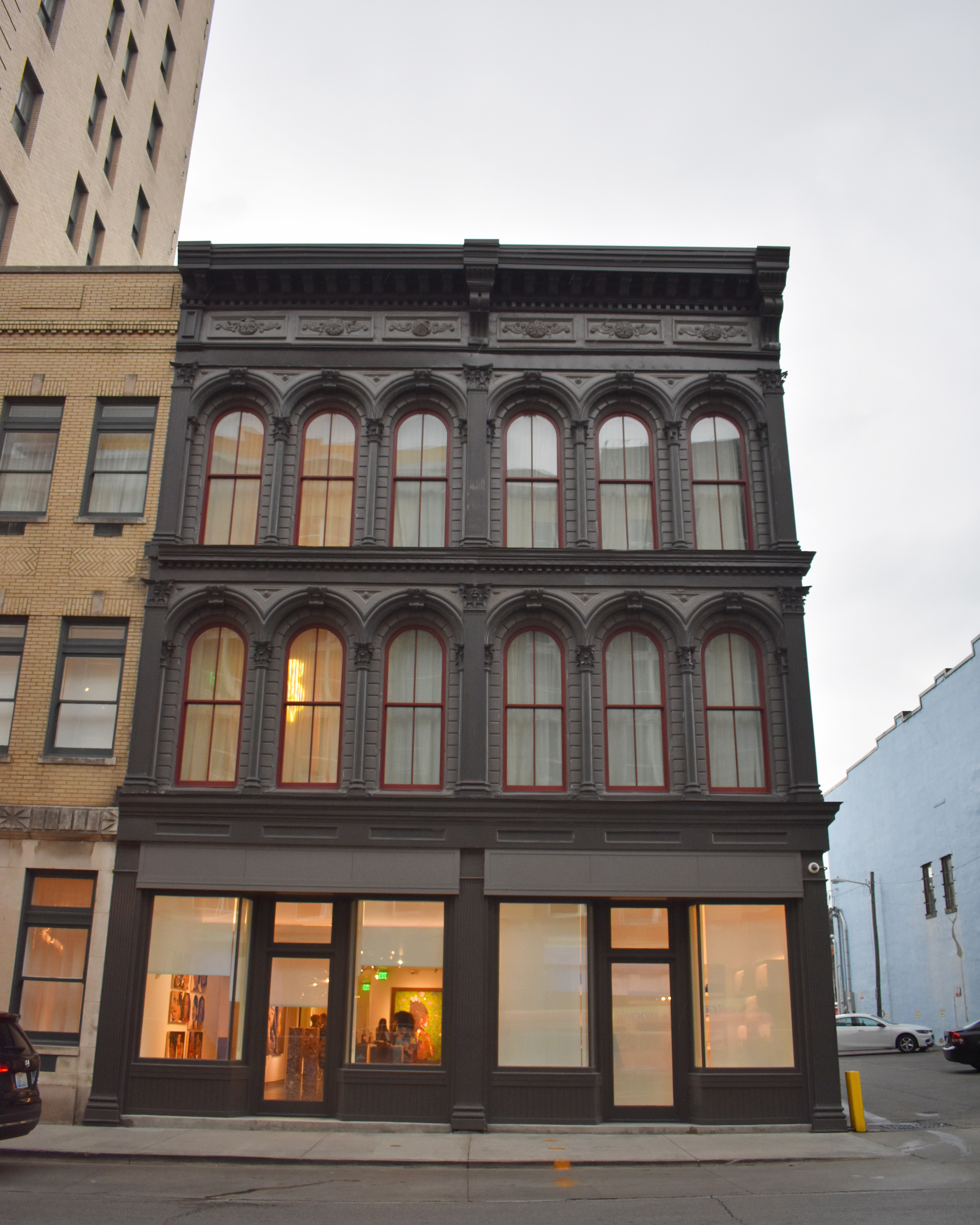
- The Higgins Block in 2019

- Location within Kentucky Location within the United States
- Location: 145--151 W. Main St., Lexington, Kentucky
- Coordinates: 38°02′49″N 84°29′52″W
- Area: less than one acre
- Built: 1872
- Architect: McMurtry, John
- Architectural style: Italianate
- Part of: Downtown Commercial District (ID83000559)
- NRHP reference No.: 77000613

Significant dates
- Added to NRHP: August 12, 1977
- Designated CP: August 25, 1983

The Higgins Block, also known as the Fayette Cigar Store, in Lexington, Kentucky, is a 3-story brick building designed by John McMurtry and constructed in 1872. The cast iron, Italianate facade originally contained five storefronts on West Main Street, each with three window bays. The surviving 2-storefront building is a remnant of the original commercial block, shortened in 1912 when construction of the Fayette National Bank Building required demolition of part of the Higgins Block. The remains of the Higgins Block were added to the National Register of Historic Places in 1977.

A public auction of the east 18-foot exposure of the Higgins Block was held in 1900 to divide the estate of the Higgins family, and the sale may have helped to preserve what is left of the building.

John Allen Higgins (1831–1880) was a planter who owned a farm near Lexington and a plantation in Arkansas. He was a son of Joel Higgins (1802–1859) and lived at Lexington's Higgins Mansion (1837–2017) until his death.
