= Cleveland-Rogers House =

Historic house in Kentucky, United States

- U.S. National Register of Historic Places
- U.S. Historic district – Contributing property
- Location within Kentucky Location within the United States
- Location: Lexington at 8151 Richmond Rd., Lexington, Kentucky
- Coordinates: 37°54′09″N 84°21′14″W
- Area: 6.9 acres (2.8 ha)
- Built: 1786, c.1819
- Architectural style: Federal
- Part of: Boone Creek Rural Historic District (ID94000839)
- NRHP reference No.: 80001511

Significant dates
- Added to NRHP: August 26, 1980
- Designated CP: August 19, 1994

The Cleveland-Rogers House, located in what is now Lexington, Kentucky at 8151 Richmond Rd., was listed on the National Register of Historic Places in 1980. Also known as Riverside Farm, the listing included two contributing buildings and a contributing structure.

A log cabin on the property was built in 1786.

The main house is a 1 1/2-story, five-bay, brick building, built c. 1819. The front facade's brick is laid in Flemish bond; common bond is used elsewhere.

It is a contributing building in the Boone Creek Rural Historic District, NRHP-listed in 1994.
