= Athens, Kentucky =

- Rural settlements of Lexington, Kentucky
- Location within Kentucky
- Coordinates: 37°56′57″N 84°21′51″W
- Country: United States
- State: Kentucky
- Counties: Fayette
- Elevation: 863 ft (263 m)
- Time zone: UTC-5 (EST)
  - Summer (DST): UTC-4 (EDT)
- GNIS feature ID: 2742270

Athens (locally /ˈeɪθənz/ AY-thənz) is a small unincorporated village in Fayette County to the east of Interstate 75 in Kentucky in the United States.

First settled in 1786 as the community of Cross Plains, the town was chartered as Athens in 1826 and had its own post office from that time until 1906. The current commercial center was reduced to its present size by a series of fires in the mid-19th century.

== Athens Historic District ==
- Athens Historic District
- U.S. National Register of Historic Places
- U.S. Historic district
- Location: SE Fayette County, Kentucky
- Coordinates: 37°56′57″N 84°21′51″W
- Architectural style: Italianate, Greek Revival, Late Victorian
- NRHP reference No.: 79000971
- Added to NRHP: 1979

The Athens Historic District was added to the National Register of Historic Places in 1979 for its Italianate, Greek Revival, and Late Victorian architecture. The Athens Historic District contains the remaining buildings of an early 19th-century village established in the southernmost part of Fayette County. The village is located in the heart of the Bluegrass region of Kentucky.

In 1775 a fort was established by Daniel Boone one-half mile west of present-day Athens. The community of Cross Plains was founded in 1783 and renamed Athens in 1825 after the Kentucky General Assembly chartered the town. During the early 19th century the community boasted several manufacturing industries including a woolen factory as well as a bagging and rope factory.

By 1860 all of the manufacturing buildings had been destroyed by fire. Local historian Robert Peter described why the buildings were not rebuilt in Athens: "Several destructive fires for so small a place have visited Athens during the course of its eventful career. In 1853-54 all the business houses on the south side of Main Street, west of the Cleveland pike were swept away in a single blaze. The buildings consumed were the Bledsoe Hotel, Harvey Nelson's dry goods store, John Donnally's store, a shoemaker's shop and a few dwellings." This description of the fires that destroyed the main part of the town attests to how large and thriving the community of Athens was in the early part of the 19th century.

There are still several buildings remaining in Athens from its early history. The Dr. Parker House is a two-story log and frame building erected between 1780 and 1820. There is also a second log building that has been covered by clapboards adjacent to the Dr. Parker House. Built during the 1780s, this could be the oldest building in Athens still standing. The Marshall Tavern is a brick building that served as an inn and was built around 1840. The Aubrey Inn, built circa 1800, stands at the corner of Main and Cleveland Road. Across the street from the tavern is the building that formerly housed Flannery's store. These buildings have mostly been converted to residential dwellings and there are few buildings that still serve a commercial functions.
