= Loudoun House =

Historic house in Kentucky, United States

- U.S. National Register of Historic Places
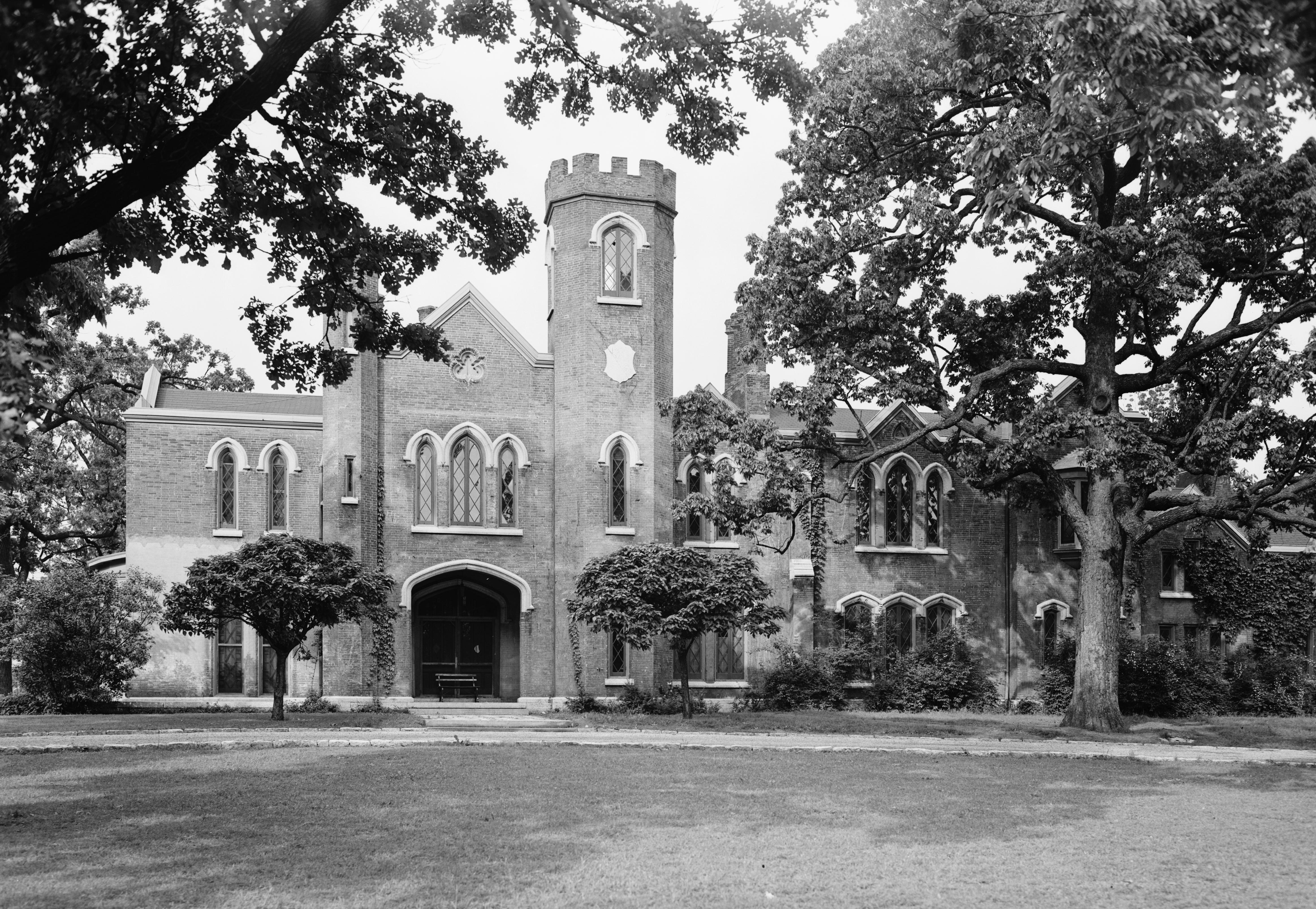
- Front of the house

- Location within Kentucky Location within the United States
- Location: Corner of Bryan Avenue and Castlewood Drive; Lexington, Kentucky
- Coordinates: 38°3′19″N 84°28′33″W
- Area: 3 acres (1.2 ha)
- Built: 1851
- Built by: John McMurtry
- Architect: Alexander Jackson Davis
- Architectural style: Gothic Revival
- NRHP reference No.: 73000798
- Added to NRHP: February 6, 1973

The Loudoun House, located in Lexington, Kentucky, is considered one of the largest and finest examples of Gothic Revival architecture in the state. Designed by New York architect Alexander Jackson Davis, the house was built in 1851 for Francis Key Hunt (1817–1879), who was named after his mother's cousin, Francis Scott Key.

The home was built on 50 acres of land given to Hunt and his wife, Julia Warfield, by her parents upon their marriage. Following the death of his father during a cholera epidemic, Hunt inherited more than a million dollars and set about building the Loudoun House. Inspired by the W. C. H. Waddell mansion on Murray Hill in New York City, Hunt wrote to A. J. Davis, who designed a castellated Gothic Revival villa for Hunt after a brief correspondence. Hunt hired Lexington builder John McMurtry to construct the home. The project was expected to cost $10,000, but wound up costing three times that amount and taking four years to complete. He named the home "Loudoun" in honor of the song "The Bells of Loudon", his wife's favorite.

Loudoun House is listed on the National Register of Historic Places. It is one of the five surviving castellated Gothic Revival villas designed by Davis in the United States.

The house currently houses the Lexington Art League.
