= Buenna Hill =

- U.S. National Register of Historic Places
- Location within Kentucky Location within the United States
- Nearest city: Centerville, Kentucky
- Coordinates: 38°10′22″N 84°24′18″W
- Area: 0.5 acres (0.20 ha)
- Architect: John McMurtry
- Architectural style: Greek Revival
- MPS: Innes Houses of Fayette County TR
- NRHP reference No.: 83002758
- Added to NRHP: June 29, 1983

Buenna Hill, located off Ferguson Rd. near Centerville, Kentucky, was listed on the National Register of Historic Places in 1983. It has also been known as Cythiana Hall. The listing included four contributing buildings.

It is described as a "Handsome Greek Revival house built by John McMurtry, well-known architect-builder for Robert Innes of the prominent Innes family who owned a large amount of property on the Russell Cave Pike."
