= Floral Hall (Lexington, Kentucky) =

- U.S. National Register of Historic Places
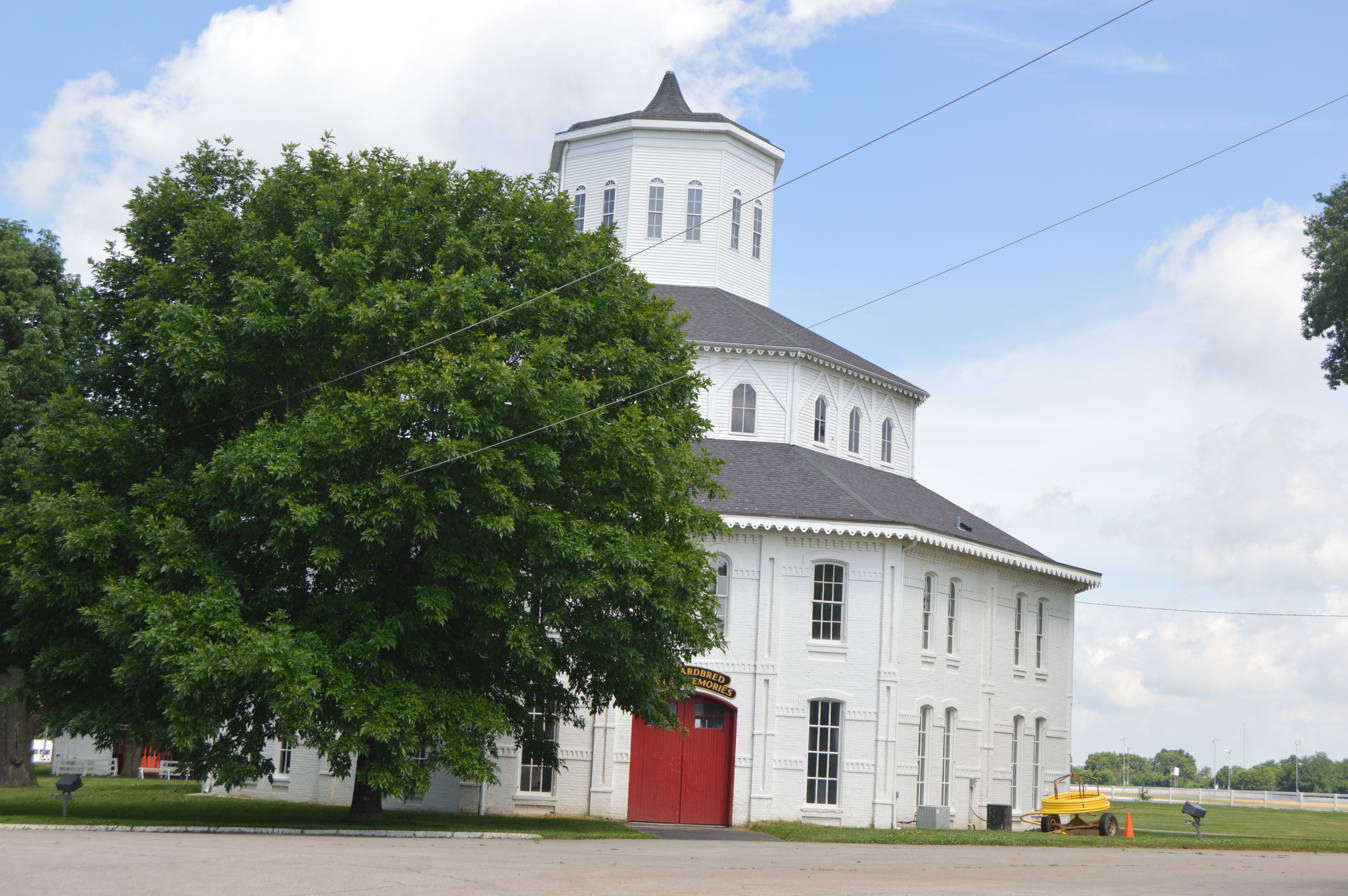
- View from the east

- Location within Kentucky Location within the United States
- Location: 847 S. Broadway, Lexington, Kentucky
- Coordinates: 38°2′27″N 84°31′3″W
- Built: 1882
- Architect: John McMurtry
- NRHP reference No.: 77000612
- Added to NRHP: August 29, 1977

Floral Hall, also known as Standardbred Stable of Memories, is an octagonal building designed by John McMurtry in Lexington, Kentucky. It was built in 1882 as an exhibition hall for floral displays on the fairgrounds of the Kentucky Agricultural & Mechanical Association.

It is notable for its architecture and was listed on the National Register of Historic Places in 1977.
