= Redd Road Rural Historic District =

- U.S. National Register of Historic Places
- Location within Kentucky Location within the United States
- Nearest city: Lexington, Kentucky
- Coordinates: 38°05′30″N 84°37′34″W
- Area: 1,646 acres (666 ha)
- Architectural style: Italianate, Vernacular domestic
- NRHP reference No.: 91000153
- Added to NRHP: February 28, 1991

The Redd Road Rural Historic District is a 1,646 acres (666 ha) historic district in Fayette County, Kentucky and Woodford County, Kentucky which was listed on the National Register of Historic Places in 1991. It is an area largely south and east of the junction of Redd and Frankfort Roads, and included 39 contributing buildings, 10 contributing structures, and 11 contributing sites.

It consists of seven adjoining farmsteads.
