= Grimes House and Mill Complex =

Historical house and mill complex in Kentucky

- U.S. National Register of Historic Places
- Location within Kentucky
- Location: Grimes Mill Road, near Lexington, Kentucky, U.S.
- Coordinates: 37.91683°N 84.34201°W
- Area: 18 acres (7.3 ha)
- Built: 1813
- NRHP reference No.: 82002687
- Added to NRHP: June 21, 1982

The Grimes House and Mill Complex, located on Boone's Creek in Fayette County, Kentucky, near Lexington, Kentucky, dates from 1813. It was listed on the National Register of Historic Places in 1982. It is historically significant in that it is considered to be one of the "most important early commercial buildings remaining in central Kentucky." It is also known as the Grimes House and Iroquois Hunt Club.

== Description ==
The complex of buildings that make up the site include the mill building, the Grimes family home, the springhouse, a cemetery and the foundations of a former flax house and a distillery. In the mid-20th century, a barn, guest house and riding arena was constructed. The Flemish bond pattern stonework used in construction are considered "some of the finest to be seen in central Kentucky.

The 18-acre site's historic function was for industry, manufacturing, processing and extraction, and was also used for domestic purposes as a single dwelling home.

The quarried stone springhouse is across the road from the mill building. It has a stone doorway and an earthen mound. It is directly adjacent to Grimes Mill Rd. and faces out upon it.

== History ==
In 1803, the two-and-a-half story Grimes Mill building was constructed. Its walls are three-and-a-half foot thick of quarried stone. The interior has a hand-hewn wooden support system. The Grimes Mill was in use until 1927.

At the time of NRHP application, the mill was occupied by the Iroquois Hunt Club. It was purchased by the Iroquois Hunt in 1928. The Iroquois Hunt, named for Iroquois, the first American-bred horse to win the Epsom Derby (in 1881), was founded in 1880. It was active in Clark and Fayette counties until 1914 under leadership of foxhunter and houndsman Roger Williams, who served as Master of Hounds at annual meets.

The Hunt was reestablished in 1926, and found itself a permanent headquarters in 1928 with the purchase. Landowners in a 10 square mile area facilitate the hunt, allowing fence-jumping, allowing coyotes to survive without poisoning or other eradication.

== Buildings ==
The 18 acres (7.3 ha) of the listing include six contributing resources and several non-contributing buildings.

=== Contributing ===
- Grimes House 37.91627°N 84.34208°W
- Grimes Mill (now the Iroquois Hunt Club) 37.91588°N 84.33993°W
- Cemetery 37.91723°N 84.34333°W
- Spring 37.91606°N 84.34029°W
- Flaxhouse foundation ruins 37.91674°N 84.34175°W
- Distillery foundation ruins 37.91573°N 84.34461°W

=== Non-contributing structures ===
- Riding arena (c.1970) 37.91697°N 84.34333°W
- Barn (c.1950) 37.91645°N 84.34283°W
- Guest house (c.1950) 37.91598°N 84.34259°W
