= DeLong Agricultural Implements Warehouse =

- U.S. National Register of Historic Places
- Location within Kentucky Location within the United States
- Location: Patterson St., Lexington, Kentucky
- Coordinates: 38°03′00″N 84°30′10″W
- Area: less than one acre
- Built: 1881
- NRHP reference No.: 80001512
- Added to NRHP: November 25, 1980

The DeLong Agricultural Implements Warehouse, on Patterson Street in Lexington, Kentucky, was built in 1881. It was listed on the National Register of Historic Places in 1980.

It was a four-story warehouse, about 44 by 150 feet (13 m × 46 m) in plan. It was 16 feet (4.9 m) tall on its first floor and 12 feet (3.7 m) on its upper floors.

The structure was "basically sound" in 1980.

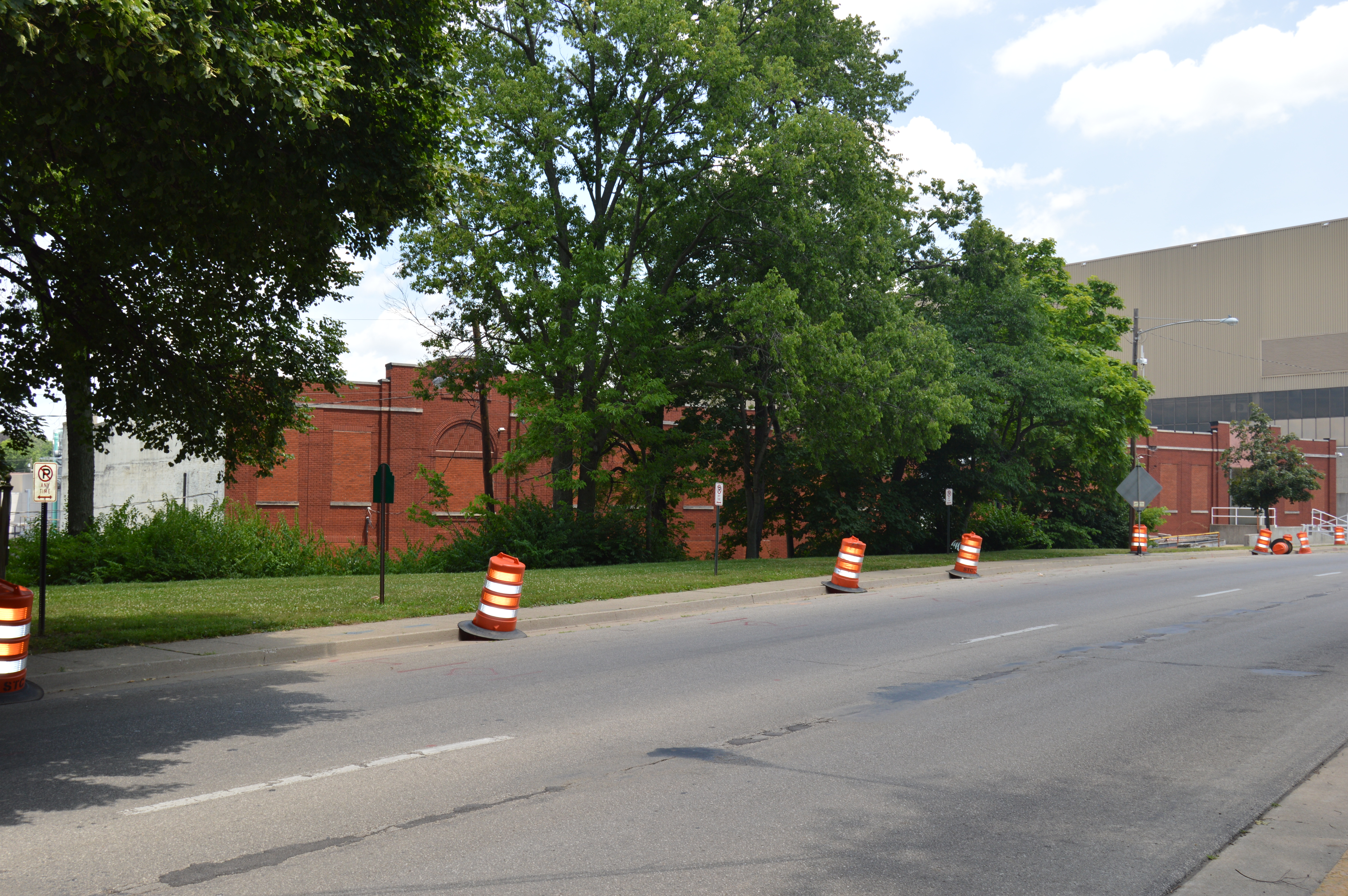
Site of warehouse

The warehouse is no longer in place.
