= Woodward Heights, Lexington =

- Woodward Heights Neighborhood Historic District
- U.S. National Register of Historic Places
- U.S. Historic district
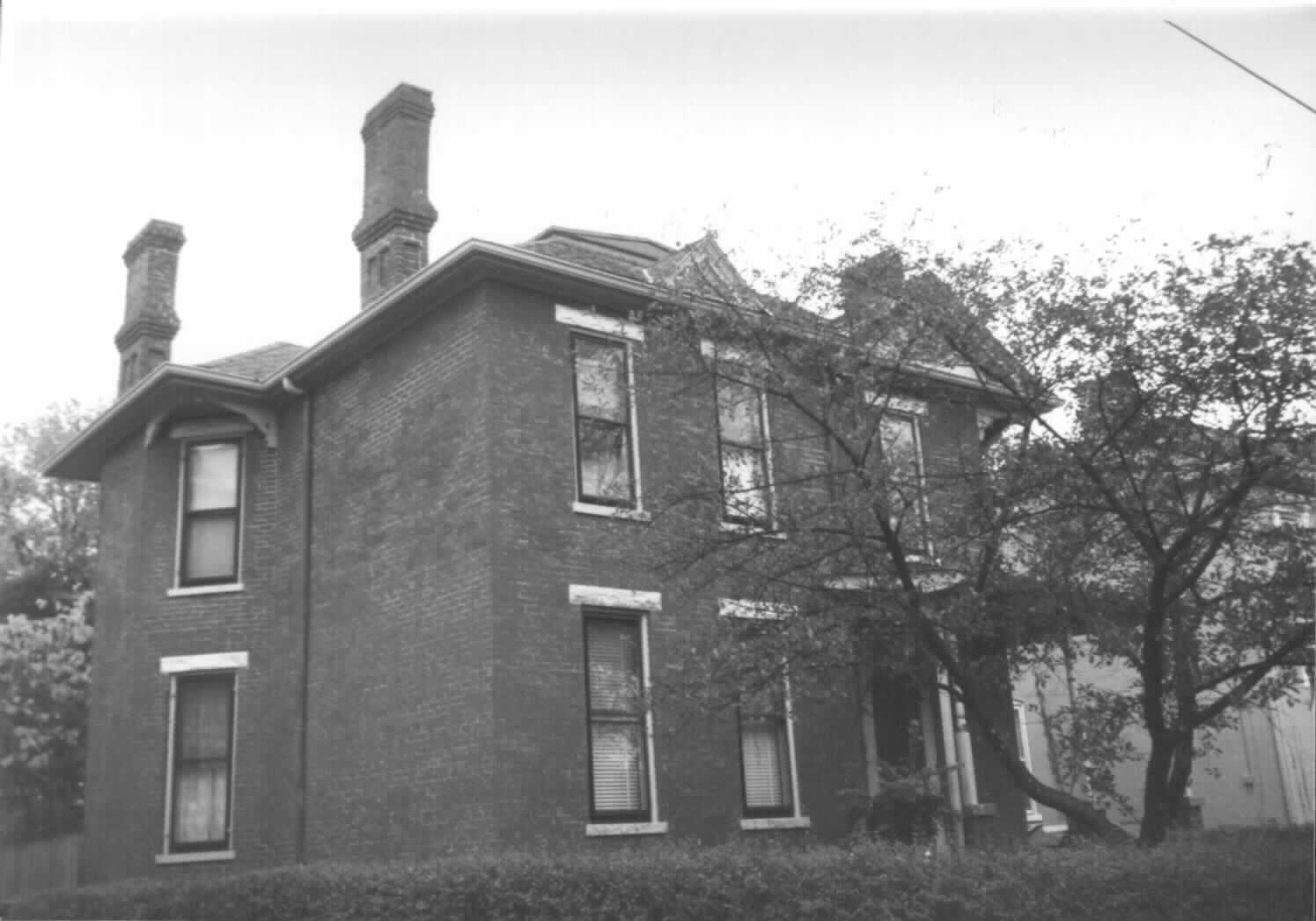
- A late nineteenth-century house typical of Woodward Heights

- Location within Kentucky
- Location: Roughly bounded by High, Merino, and Pine Sts., Lexington, Kentucky
- Coordinates: 38°3′0″N 84°30′25″W
- Area: 24.5 acres (9.9 ha)
- Built: ca. 1818 through World War I
- Architect: Multiple
- Architectural style: Greek Revival, Late Victorian, Federal
- NRHP reference No.: 80001525
- Added to NRHP: December 1, 1980

Woodward Heights is a neighborhood and historic district located immediately west of downtown Lexington, Kentucky. It is bounded by Maxwell Street and the Pleasant Green Hill neighborhood to the southwest, by the parking lot for Rupp Arena to the southeast, by the Lexington Convention Center property to the northeast, and by Herlihy, Cox, and High Streets to the north.

The neighborhood includes one park, Woodward Heights Park, at 651 West High Street in the neighborhood's eastern corner. The neighborhood has a land area of 0.049 square miles (0.13 km^{2}), and as of 2009, a population of 292 people, a population density of 6,002 people per square mile, and a median household income of $34,571. Like all of Lexington, the neighborhood is in the Fayette County Public Schools district. Neighborhood children attend Harrison Elementary School, Lexington Traditional Magnet School (middle school), and Lafayette High School.

== History ==
In 1980, the neighborhood was listed on the National Register of Historic Places, as Woodward Heights Neighborhood Historic District.

The Historic Woodward Heights Neighborhood Association incorporated as a non-profit in 1989.

== Individually listed properties ==
In addition to being listed on the National Register of Historic Places as a district, several individual properties are or have been listed. Located near the center of Woodward Heights, Botherum, a private residence built in 1850, was listed in 1973. At the northeast side of the neighborhood, adjoining Woodward Heights Park, the Henry Watt House (also known as the Saunier House and the Watt-Saunier House) was listed in 1977. Built circa 1818, it was the second-oldest house in the area, and no longer stands.

=== Botherum ===
Botherum was built for Madison C. Johnson.

=== Henry Watt House ===
- Henry Watt House
- U.S. National Register of Historic Places
- U.S. Historic district – Contributing property
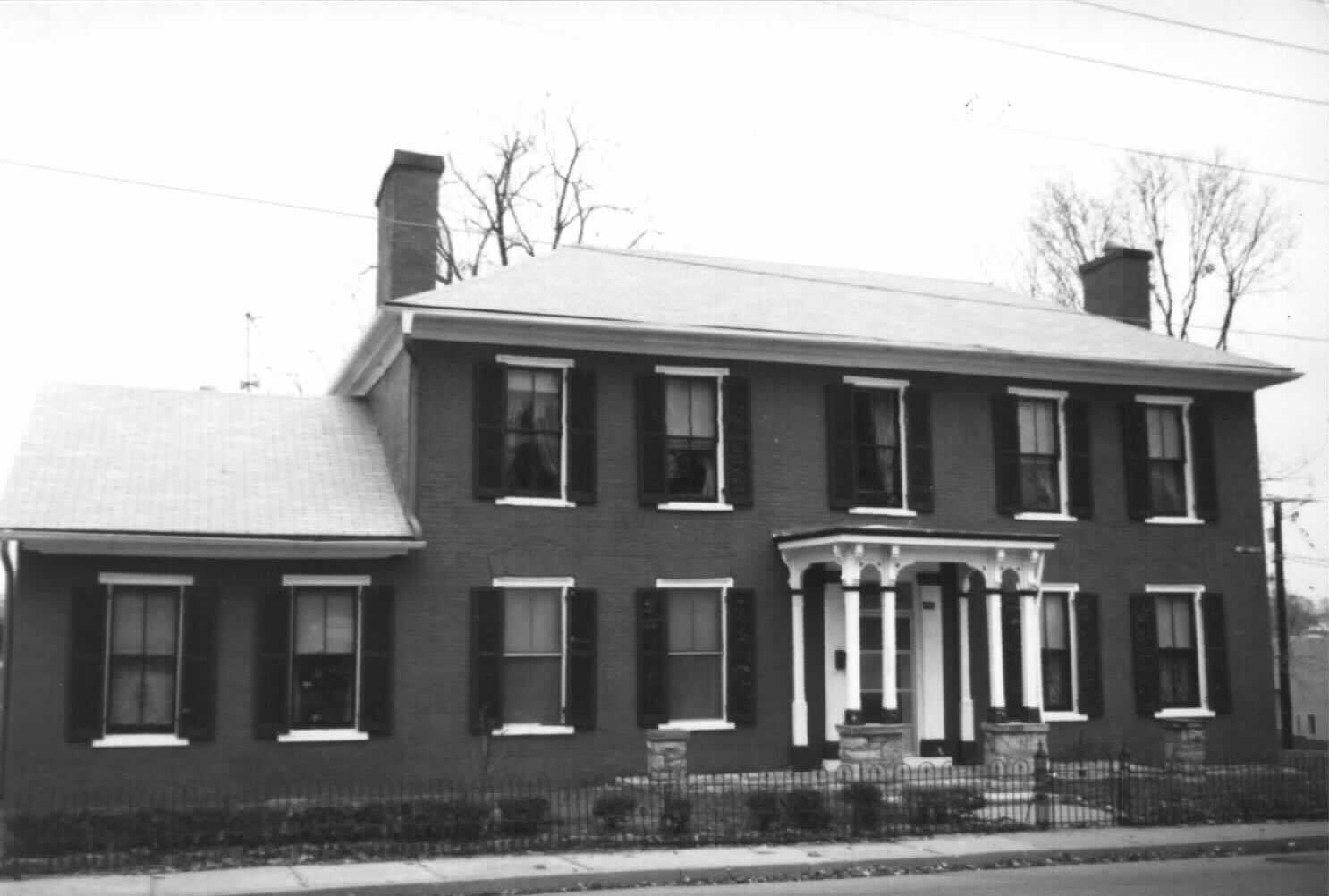
- The Henry Watt House was built ca. 1818.
- Location: 703 W. High St., Lexington, Kentucky
- Coordinates: 38°3′1″N 84°30′17″W
- Area: 0.3 acres (0.12 ha)
- Built: 1818
- Part of: Woodward Heights Neighborhood Historic District (ID80001525)
- NRHP reference No.: 77000615

Significant dates
- Added to NRHP: December 16, 1977
- Designated CP: December 1, 1980

Henry Watt House, aka Saunier House, aka Watt-Saunier House, stood at 703 West High Street in Lexington, Kentucky. House was built circa 1818 by an unknown architect, listed on the National Register of Historic Places in 1977, included as a contributing property in the 1980 listing of the Woodward Heights Neighborhood Historic District, and demolished in the 1990s following a fire.

=== Cassidy House ===
The Cassidy House at 816/820 W. High St., on the National Register of Historic Places, was built and occupied for the esteemed educator Massillon Alexander Cassidy.
