= Shelby Family Houses =

Historic houses in Kentucky, United States

- U.S. National Register of Historic Places
- U.S. Historic district
- Location within Kentucky Location within the United States
- Nearest city: Lexington, Kentucky
- Coordinates: 37°56′11″N 84°25′24″W
- Area: 20.1 acres (8.1 ha)
- Architect: Multiple
- NRHP reference No.: 78001322
- Added to NRHP: November 17, 1978

The Shelby Family Houses near Lexington, Kentucky are five houses that together were listed on the National Register of Historic Places in 1978.

The listing covers:

- "Greenfields", 5510 Richmond Road, Lexington
- "Grassland" (1823), Shelby Lane, Lexington, an L-shaped two-and-a-half-story brick house
- "Richland" (1820s or 1830s), Richmond Road, Lexington
- "Ruemont", Jacks Creek Pike, Lexington
- "Highland Hall", 6208 Richmond Rd., Lexington, Kentucky, which is separately listed on the National Register.

A sixth house, "Belair", is excluded from the National Register listing.

The 20.1-acre (8.1 ha) listing included, in 1978, 10 contributing buildings and one other contributing site.
