= Downtown Commercial District (Lexington, Kentucky) =

Historic district in Kentucky, United States

- U.S. National Register of Historic Places
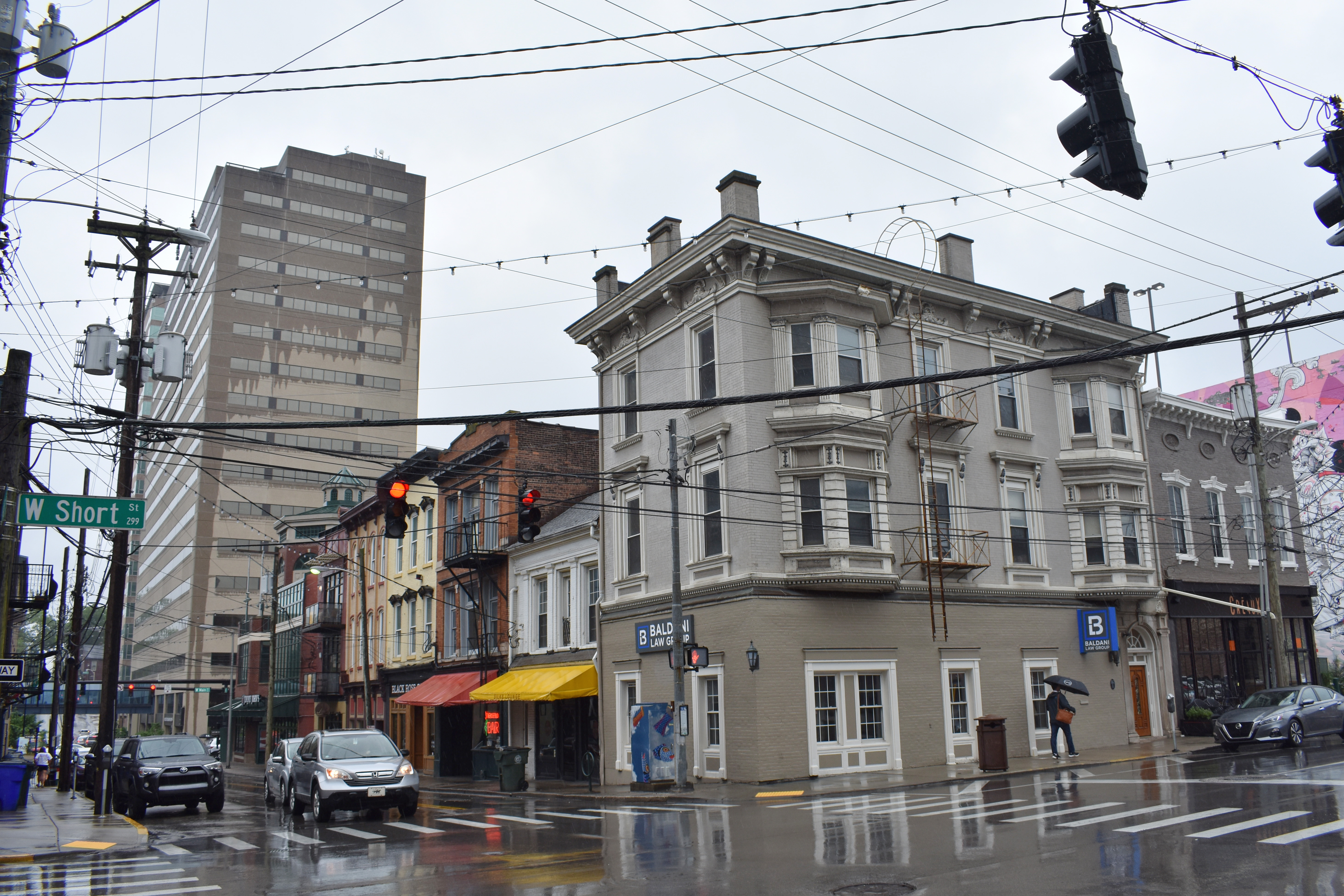
- The Downtown Commercial District in 2019

- Location within Kentucky Location within the United States
- Location: Roughly bounded by Main, Church, Walnut Sts., and Broadway, Lexington, Kentucky
- Area: 10 acres (4.0 ha)
- Architect: Multiple
- Architectural style: Mixed (more Than 2 Styles From Different Periods)
- NRHP reference No.: 83000559
- Added to NRHP: August 25, 1983

The Downtown Commercial District in Lexington, Kentucky, includes 70 contributing properties, some dating from the early 19th century. Most sites are commercial buildings, but the district also features a courthouse, two monuments, a camel sculpture, a drinking fountain, and a clock. Various architectural styles are represented, including Federal, Greek Revival, Italianate, Victorian, Queen Anne, Richardsonian Romanesque, Beaux Arts, and Modern. Architects include Gideon Shryock, Benjamin Henry Latrobe, H.L. Rowe, Frankel & Curtis, and McKim, Mead & White. Also included within the district are 17 noncontributing properties. The Downtown Commercial District was added to the National Register of Historic Places in 1983.

Lexington's street grid was platted beginning in 1780, and the Downtown Commercial District is contained within the oldest part of the city. The district is roughly bounded by Church St, N Limestone St, E Short St, E Main St, W Main St, and N Mill St.

== Contributing properties ==
Some buildings in the district were constructed after fires in 1875 and in 1917 destroyed previous buildings, and other historic buildings were destroyed by urban renewal. This list of contributing properties includes the street group and where available the name, year, address, architect, and style of each building.

Cheapside

- Fayette Safety Vault and Trust Company Building (1890) NRHP, 111-113 Cheapside, H.L. Rowe, Victorian
- Robert S. Todd Store Building (c1807), 115-117 Cheapside, Federal
- Second National Bank Building (1955), 119-121 Cheapside, Nicholas Warfield Gratz, Neoclassical
- Payne Building (1891), 125-127 Cheapside, Victorian
- Loughridge Building (1895), 129-131 Cheapside, H.L. Rowe, Richardsonian Romanesque

Church Street

- Building (1935), 108-114 Church St

North Limestone Street

- Thomas Lyons Building (c1875), 109-113 N Limestone St, Italianate
- Lyons Block (c1875), 106-108 N Limestone St, Italianate
- Lyons Block (c1875), 110-112 N Limestone St, Italianate
- James McCormick Building (c1875), 122 N Limestone St, Italianate
- Harold Fine Building (1920), 124-128 N Limestone St, Arts and Crafts movement
- David Clohesey Building (c1875), 130-132 N Limestone St, Italianate
- Gratz Real Estate Building (1920), 131-137 N Limestone St, possibly Nicholas Warfield Gratz, Colonial Revival
- Charles Berryman Building (c1915), 134-136 N Limestone St, Colonial Revival
- Piggly Wiggly Store (c1920), 139-143 N Limestone St
- Building (c1920), 147 N Limestone St
- Feeney's Shoe Store Building (c1920), 149-153 N Limestone St
- Hotel (c1928), 155 N Limestone St
- Hotel (1928), 159 N Limestone St, Arts and Crafts

East Main Street

- Waters Block, AKA Lyons Block (c1875), 101-109 E Main St, Italianate
- Hallmark House (c1923), 111 E Main St, Frankel & Curtis
- Benton Ross Todd Company Building, AKA Charles Berryman Building (1920), 113-117 E Main St, possibly Frank L. Smith, Beaux Arts
- Nunan Building (1912, possibly 1860s), 123-125 E Main St, Neoclassical
- Carty Block (c1871), 129-131 E Main St, Italianate
- Byrnes & Hall Drug Store (c1920), 133 E Main St
- Lexington Steam Laundry Company (c1890), 135 E Main St
- Old Bank of Commerce Building (c1918), 137 E Main St, possibly Frankel & Curtis, Neoclassical
- Lexington Laundry Company (c1929), 139 E Main St, Art Deco
- Graham Building (1902), 141-143 E Main St, possibly H.L. Rowe, Neoclassical

West Main Street

- John B. Johnson's Saddlery (1830s), 101-103 W Main St, Federal
- Odd Fellows Temple (1869) NRHP, 115-119 W Main St, Cincinnatus Shryock, Italianate
- Skuller's Clock (c1910), 119 W Main St, Brown Street Clocks, Neoclassical
- Randall Building Bogaert's Jewelry Store (1870s) NRHP, 127-129 W Main St, possibly Phelix L. Lundin, Italianate
- Higgins Block (c1872) NRHP, 145-151 W Main St, John McMurtry, Italianate
- Fayette National Bank Building (1913) NRHP, 159-167 W Main St, McKim, Mead & White, Beaux Arts
- McAdams and Morford Building (1849) NRHP, 200-210 W Main St, Italianate
- Fayette County Courthouse (1900), 215 W Main St, Lehman & Schmitt, Richardsonian Romanesque
- John Hunt Morgan Memorial (1910) NRHP, Corner W Main & N Upper Sts, Pompeo Coppini
- Ellis Fountain (1921), 215 W Main St
- Union Station Camel (c1920), Corner W Main St & Cheapside
- John C. Breckinridge Memorial (1887) NRHP, Cheapside between W Short & W Main Sts, Edward Virginius Valentine
- Lexington City National Bank Building (1904) NRHP, 259-265 W Main St, Richards, McCarty & Bulford, Beaux Arts
- Benjamin Winslow Dudley Hospital (c1834), 301-305 W Main St, Federal
- Wilgus Block (c1805 or c1872), 309-315 W Main St, Italianate

North Mill Street

- James Dunn House (1807), 108-110 N Mill St, Federal
- Richardson Building (1900), 109 N Mill St, Neoclassical
- Robert Peter Building (1890), 115-117 N Mill St, Italianate
- Geary & Roche Plumbing Company Building (1871), 119 N Mill St, Italianate
- Margaret Price Building (1915), 121 N Mill St
- Monsieur Giron's Confectionary (1829) NRHP, 125 N Mill St, Greek Revival

West Short Street

- Alexander Hotel (c1875), 102-110 W Short St, Italianate
- Merrick Lodge #31 (c1893), 101-105 W Short St, H.L. Rowe, Neoclassical
- Morton Realty Company Building (1928), 107 Short St
- Still Building (1925), 129-131 W Short St
- Remington Rand Building (1928), 133 W Short St, Tudor Revival
- Messick Building (1928), 155-157 W Short St, possibly Frankel & Curtis, Neoclassical
- McClelland Building (1901), 159-167 W Short St, Richards, McCarty & Bulford; Arthur Giannini, Beaux Arts
- Guarantee Bank & Trust Company Building (1924), 201-211 W Short St, Art Deco
- Old First National Bank Building (1895), 215-219 W Short St, possibly H.L. Rowe, Beaux Arts
- Northern Bank Building (1890), 249-257 W Short St, H.L. Rowe, Victorian
- Northern Bank Building (1890), 259-267 W Short St, H.L. Rowe, Victorian
- Security Trust Building (1905), 267-275 W Short St, Richards, McCarty & Bulford, Beaux Arts
- Harting Block (1905), 300 W Short St, H.L. Rowe, Neoclassical
- Old U.S. Post Office (c1825), 315 Short St, Federal
- Lewis Ramsey Meat Market (1870s), 310-312 W Short St, Italianate
- Hotel Reed Annex (c1901), 313-315 W Short St, Martin Geertz, Queen Anne
- Campbell Building (c1886), 316-318 W Short St, probably H.L. Rowe, Greek Revival

North Upper Street

- Chinn & Todd Building (1896), 108 N Upper St, possibly Aldenburg & Scott
- Clay-Worsley Building (c1805), 110-112 N Upper St, Federal
- Berkley, Guthrie & Watson Building (1885), 114-116 N Upper St, H.L. Rowe, Victorian
- Berkley, Guthrie & Watson Addition (c1891), 118-120 N Upper St, possibly H.L. Rowe, Victorian
- Walter Warfield Building (1806), 122-124 N Upper St, possibly Mathias Shryock, Georgian
