= Central Frankfort Historic District =

Historic district in Frankfort, Kentucky

- U.S. National Register of Historic Places
- U.S. Historic district
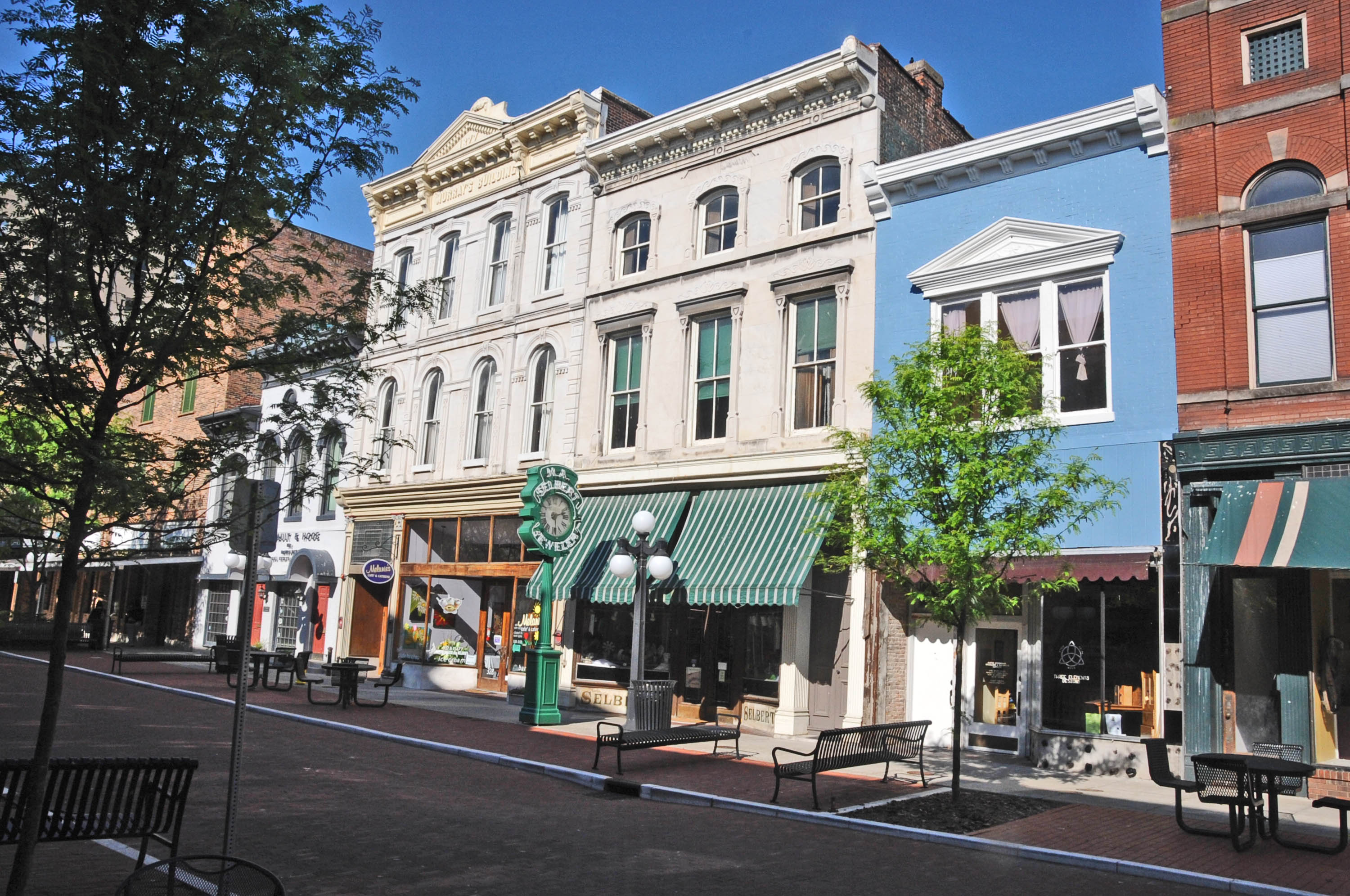

- Location within Kentucky Location within the United States
- Location: Bounded by East and West 2nd St., Logan St., the Kentucky River, High St., and Mero St., Frankfort, Kentucky
- Coordinates: 38.1956°N 84.8761°W
- Area: 126 acres (51 ha)
- Built: 1795
- Architectural style: Federal, Greek Revival, Gothic Revival
- NRHP reference No.: 09000570
- Added to NRHP: July 28, 2009

The Central Frankfort Historic District in Frankfort, Kentucky was listed on the National Register of Historic Places in 2009.

The district includes 401 resources (buildings, structures, objects, sites) on 126 acres (51 ha). It is roughly bounded by East and West 2nd St., Logan St., the Kentucky River, High St., and Mero St.

The district was created to merge and expand upon previously listed historic resources. It includes all of:

- Liberty Hall (Frankfort, Kentucky), NRHP-listed in 1971, and a National Historic Landmark
- Old Governor's Mansion, NRHP-listed in 1971
- Old Statehouse, NRHP-listed in 1971
- Old U.S. Court House & Post Office, NRHP-listed in 1974
- Corner in Celebrities Historic District, NRHP-listed in 1971
- Old Statehouse Historic District (Frankfort, Kentucky), NRHP-listed in 1980
- Frankfort Commercial Historic District, NRHP-listed in 1982 with additional documentation in 2008.

It also includes portions of Second Street and Shelby Street within the South Frankfort Neighborhood Historic District, NRHP-listed in 1982, which contains the current Kentucky State Capitol, Governor's Mansion, and surrounding residential area. It additionally includes and recognizes properties, in and outside of the previously listed areas, of later periods of significance than previously recognized.

The district thus created constitutes a "well-defined evolutionary district which portrays development in Frankfort from the 1790s into the 1960s."

When listed, its 401 resources included 241 resources previously listed, plus 78 new contributing buildings, a new contributing site, four new contributing structures, two new contributing objects, and 24 new non-contributing resources, all in a 126 acres (51 ha) area.

It includes four properties documented in the Historic American Buildings Survey during 1937-1940:

- Good Shepherd Roman Catholic Church,
- Liberty Hall,
- Old State House, and
- Orlando Brown House.

The district was deemed significant "on a statewide basis as a strong concentration of primarily residential and commercial historic resources built largely on a late-eighteenth-century grid of streets encompassing historic state governmental buildings, representative of the cultural patterns of governance, commerce, and community planning, and containing the homes of a series of individuals of transcendent importance to the locale, state, and nation."
