= Corner in Celebrities Historic District =

Historic district in Kentucky, United States

- U.S. National Register of Historic Places
- U.S. Historic district
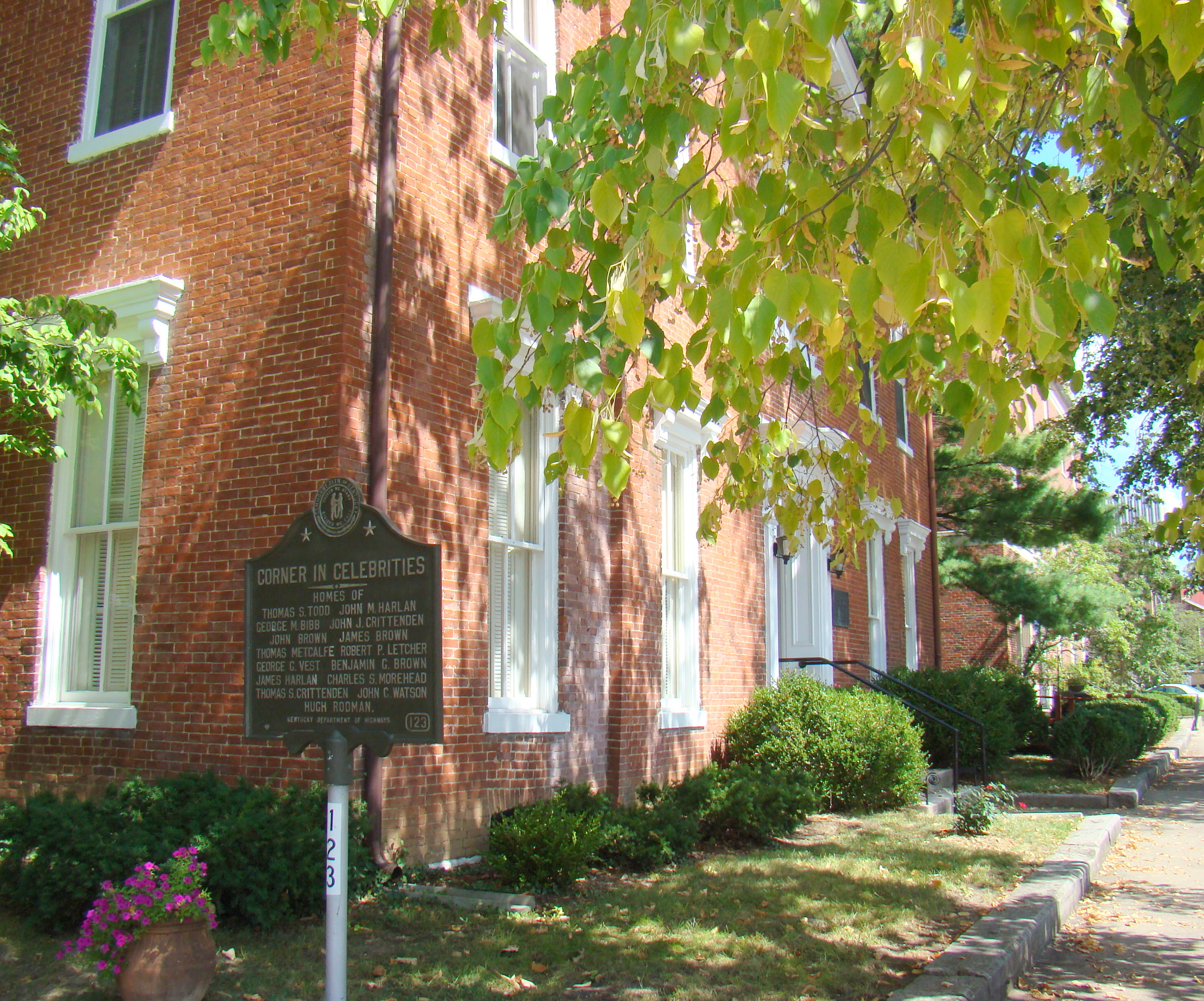
- Corner in Celebrities Historic District in Frankfort, Kentucky.

- Location within Kentucky Location within the United States
- Location: Roughly bounded by Kentucky River on S and W, St. Clair and Main Sts., Frankfort, Kentucky
- Coordinates: 38°11′52″N 84°52′48″W
- Built: 1800
- Architect: Multiple
- Architectural style: Greek Revival, Federal, Georgian, Gothic Revival
- NRHP reference No.: 71000343
- Added to NRHP: March 11, 1971

Corner in Celebrities Historic District is a neighborhood located in the north section of Frankfort, Kentucky, that is designated an historic district because of the high concentration of structures that previously belonged to notable residents. The area contains the historic homes of George M. Bibb, Benjamin G. Brown, James Brown, John Brown, John J. Crittenden, Thomas Crittenden, James Harlan, John Marshall Harlan, Robert P. Letcher, William Lindsay, Thomas Metcalfe, Charles Slaughter Morehead, William Owsley, Hugh Rodman, Charles S. Todd, Thomas Todd, George G. Vest, John C. Watson, and Simeon Willis. The area was added to the U.S. National Register of Historic Places in 1971.

The district is entirely included in the Central Frankfort Historic District, listed on the National Register in 2009.

== Founding of Frankfort ==
The town of Frankfort, Kentucky was founded in 1786 on 100 acres (40 ha) of land on the north side of the Kentucky River on property owned by General James Wilkinson. After Kentucky became the fifteenth American state in 1792, Frankfort was named the state capital.

== Wapping Street ==
Wapping Street is a public thoroughfare located in northern Frankfort that runs east and west parallel to the Kentucky River through the Corner in Celebrities historic district. The street was named for the "Old Wapping Stairs" in London by homesick Englishman, John Instone, a friend of the town's founder.

=== Thomas Todd House ===
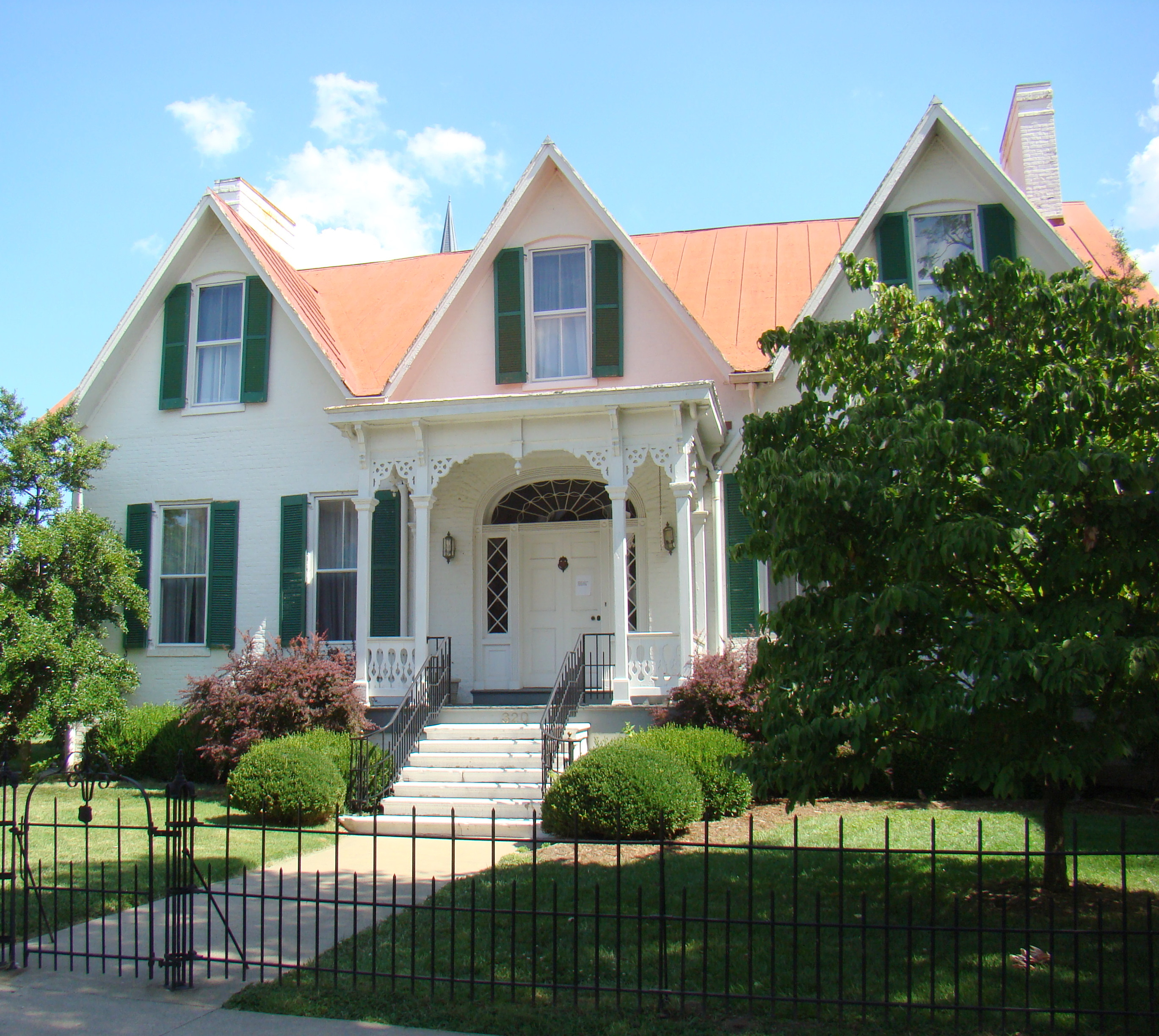
Thomas Todd House

The Thomas Todd House is located at 320 Wapping Street. The Federal style structure was built in 1812 by either Hayden Edwards or William Walker with the Victorian style features added later.

After serving in the Continental Army during the American Revolutionary War, Thomas Todd studied law and land surveying under his cousin Harry Innes. In 1784 Todd move to Kentucky when Judge Harry Innes was appointed to begin the federal court in Danville, Kentucky. During his time in Danville, Todd served as a clerk for five Constitutional Conventions regarding Kentucky's statehood. After being admitted to the bar in 1788, Todd was a clerk to federal Judge Innes and served as the clerk of the Kentucky House of Representatives until 1799 when the Kentucky Supreme Court was created and Todd was appointed its chief clerk. Kentucky Governor James Garrard appointed Todd to fill the a newly added seat to the Court, and five years later he was named Chief Justice of the Kentucky Court. In 1807, United States President Thomas Jefferson appointed Todd, then age forty-one, to United States Supreme Court where he served until his death in 1826. After his appointment to the Supreme Court, Todd remained active in local and state affairs.

In 1818, while serving on the U.S. Supreme Court, Todd purchased the house on Wapping Street and lived there with his second wife Lucy (Payne) Washington, sister of Dolley Madison. Todd died on February 7, 1826, and was buried in the Innes family cemetery. Later Todd and his wife were reinterred at the Frankfort Cemetery.

=== Vest-Lindsey House ===
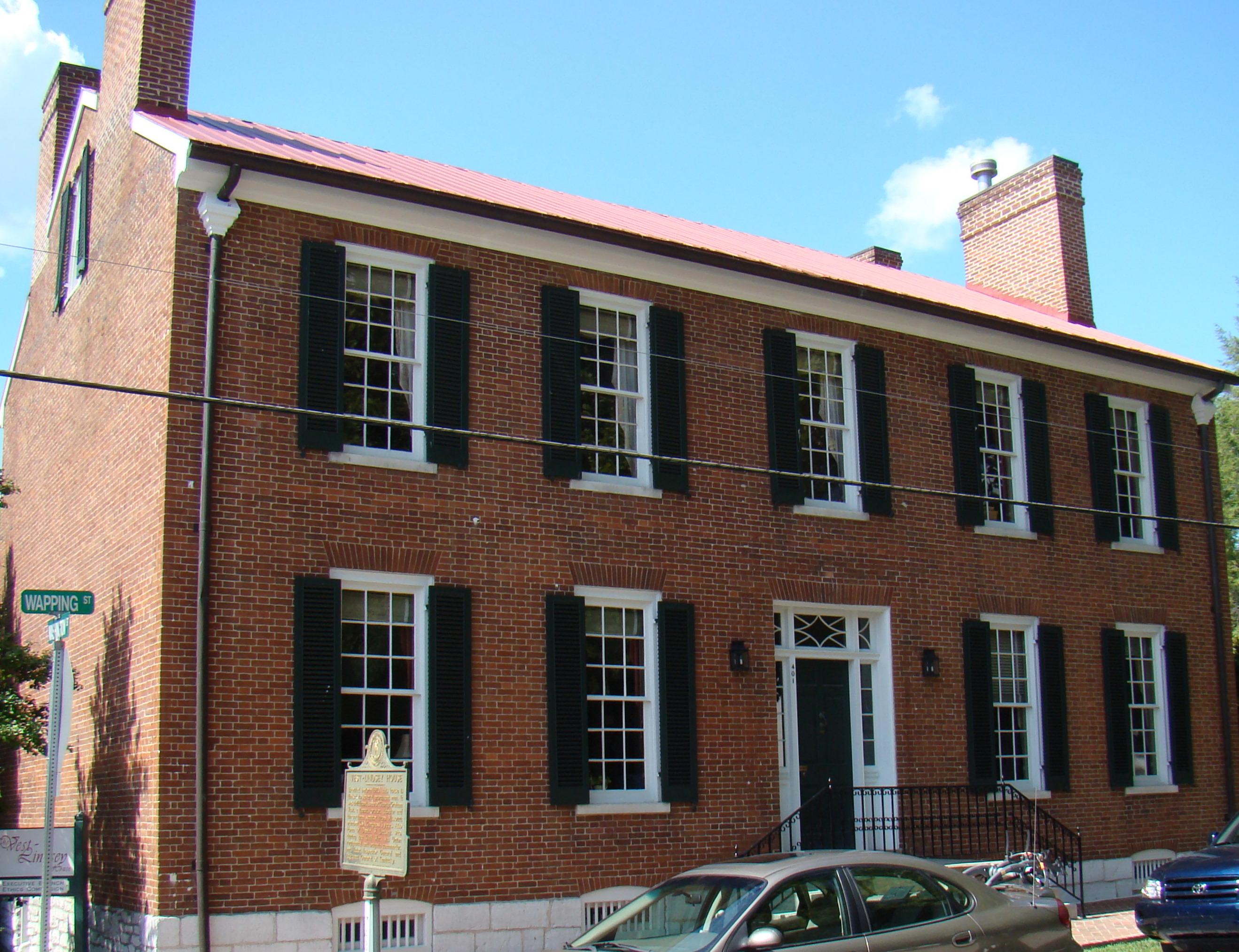
Vest-Lindsey House

The Vest-Lindsey House is located at 401 Wapping Street. The building, a twelve-room Federal style house, was constructed in approximately 1798 making the structure one of the oldest houses in Frankfort. The House was the childhood home of United States Senator George Graham Vest. Vest served in the Senate for 25 years until his death in 1903. Vest is best remembered for his closing trial remarks where he coined the line "Dog is man's best friend."

Daniel Lindsey, a Union Army General during the American Civil War and Adjutant General and Inspector General of Kentucky's military forces, bought the building from Vest in 1846. The Lindsey family owned the property until it was purchased by the Commonwealth of Kentucky in 1965.

=== Bibb-Burnley House ===
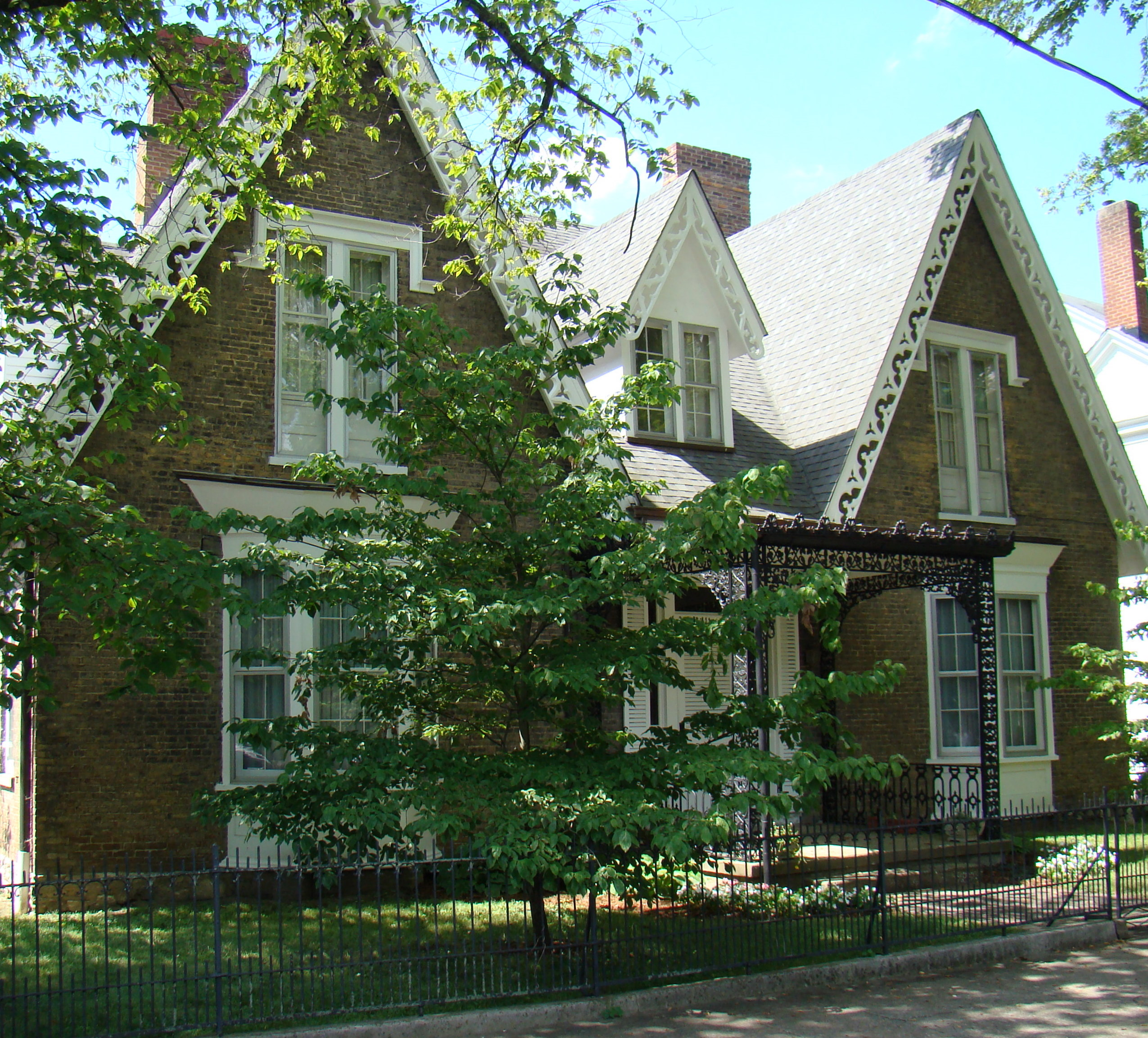
Bibb-Burnley House

The Bibb-Burnley House, also called Gray Gables, is located at 411 Wapping Street.

In 1856, John Bibb relocated to Frankfort from Logan County after being elected to the Kentucky Legislature. Bibb bought the property on Wapping Street that had a home built by John Instone, one of the first houses built in the town. Bibb built a new twenty-one room Gothic Revival house on the site using material from the original structure.

Mary Anne Burnley, a niece of Bibb, lived in the house. Burnley's interest in culture and the arts associates the house with several prominent writers and musicians including John Fox, Jr. and Robert Burns Wilson.

=== Other Wapping Street properties ===
Some of the other structures on Wapping Street that are part of this historic district include:

- Rodman-Hewitt House (c.1817) — Two story brick Federal style residence named for two previous owners Hugh Rodman and ex-CSA officer Fayette Hewitt who served for ten years as State auditor and president of the State National Bank of Frankfort.
- Carneal-Watson House (c.1855) — Brick Greek Revival residence named for Thomas Carneal and John C. Watson
- Graham Vreeland House (c.1913) — Also called "Vauxhall" and "Garden Hall", this Georgian architecture mansion was built with all the latest technical amenities of the day, including a bell-call system and a built-in vacuum. Built for Anne Graves Crutcher Vreeland, second wife of Graham Vreeland, founder and editor of the longest-running local newspaper.
- South-Willis House (c.1875) — Named for original owner John Glover South and later owner Governor Simeon Willis.
- Pruett House (c.1928) — Residence of Pruett family. In 1966, daughter Rebecca Pruett authored The Browns of Liberty Hall for National Society of the Colonial Dames of America
- The Old Post Office (c.1887) — A large Victorian and French Empire building
- Good Shepherd Parish (1850) — A Gothic Revival architecture church building

== Wilkinson Street ==
Wilkinson Street is a public thoroughfare named for town founder, General Wilkinson, who ran a ferry on the northern bank of the Kentucky River where the street started. The street runs north through the Corner in Celebrities historic district.

=== Crittenden-Garrard House ===
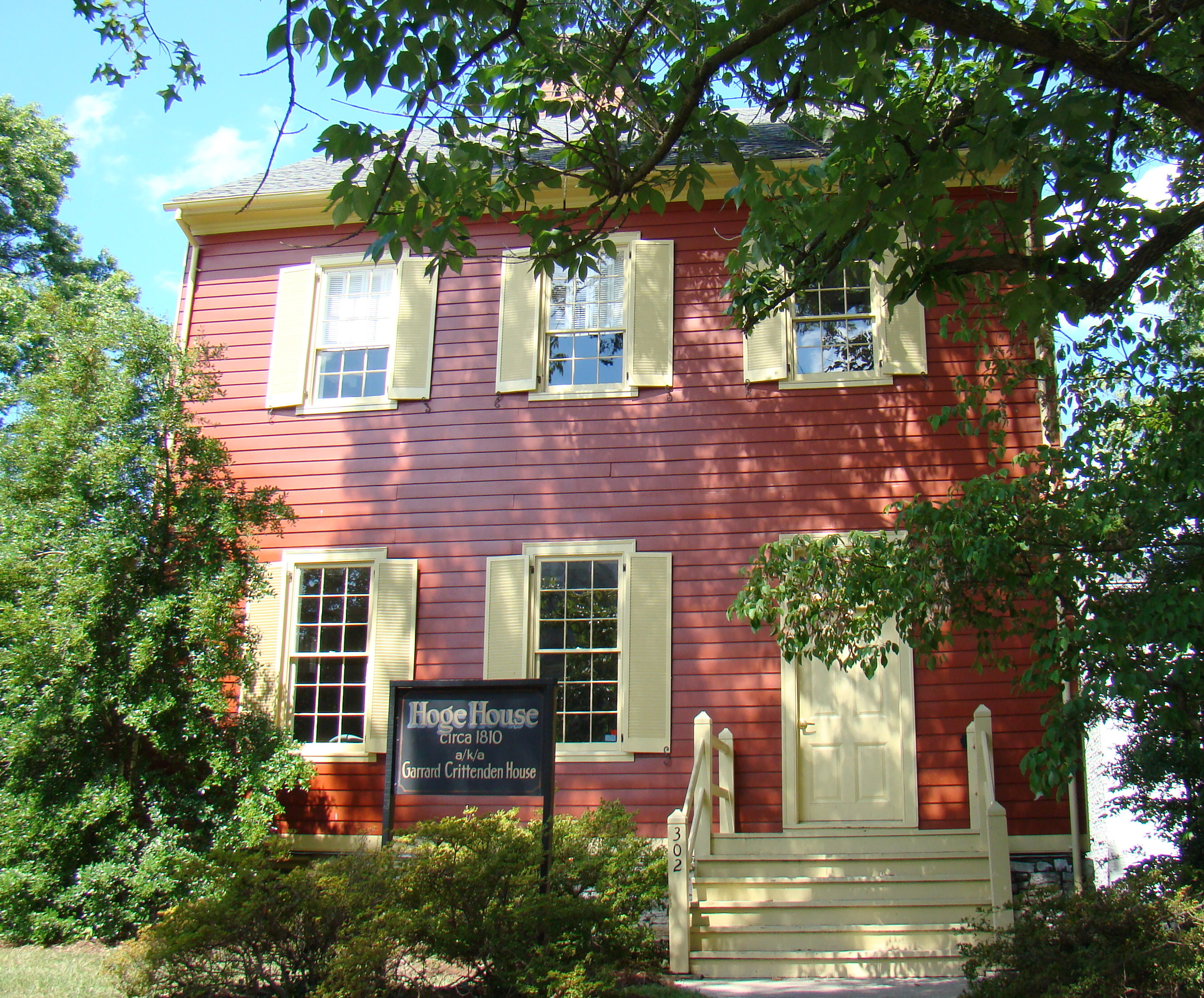
Crittenden-Garrard House

The Crittenden-Garrad House, also called the Hoge House, is located at 302 Wilkinson Street. The Federal style structure was constructed in approximately 1810. Property records show that Frankfort Judge Jacob Swigert and his wife Rebecca were early owner of the house. In 1855, the Swigert's sold the property to Thomas Crittenden. Crittenden, the son of John J. Crittenden, was a Major General for the Union Army in the American Civil War. Additionally, Crittenden was U.S. Consul to Liverpool and later Kentucky State Treasurer.

In 1859, James H. Garrard, the grandson of Kentucky's second Governor, purchased the property. Garrard served as a General for the Union Army in the American Civil War. Garrard represented Clay, Letcher, and Perry Counties in the Kentucky Constitutional Convention Later, Garrard was the Kentucky State Treasurer from 1857 to 1865.

After James' death, his wife Letitia continued to live in the home. The Garrard family retained the property until 1902 when the house was sold to Callaway Hoge, wife of Will H. Hoge. The Hoge family keep the home until after 1944.

== Liberty Hall Historic Site ==
Liberty Hall Historic Site is located at 202 and 218 Wilkinson Streets and encompasses a full city block of two historic homes and 4 acres of gardens. Liberty Hall, built in 1796, was the home of John Brown, one of Kentucky's first Senators. The Orlando Brown House was built in 1835 for his son. Today Liberty Hall Historic Site serves as a learning center that engages the public in exploring the history, politics, social and cultural life in early Kentucky through the homes, gardens, documents, and artifacts of Senator John Brown and his family. Owned and operated by the National Society of the Colonial Dames of America, the site and museums are seasonally open to the public.

== See also ==
- National Register of Historic Places listings in Franklin County, Kentucky
