= Old Statehouse Historic District (Frankfort, Kentucky) =

Historic district in Kentucky, United States

- U.S. National Register of Historic Places
- U.S. Historic district
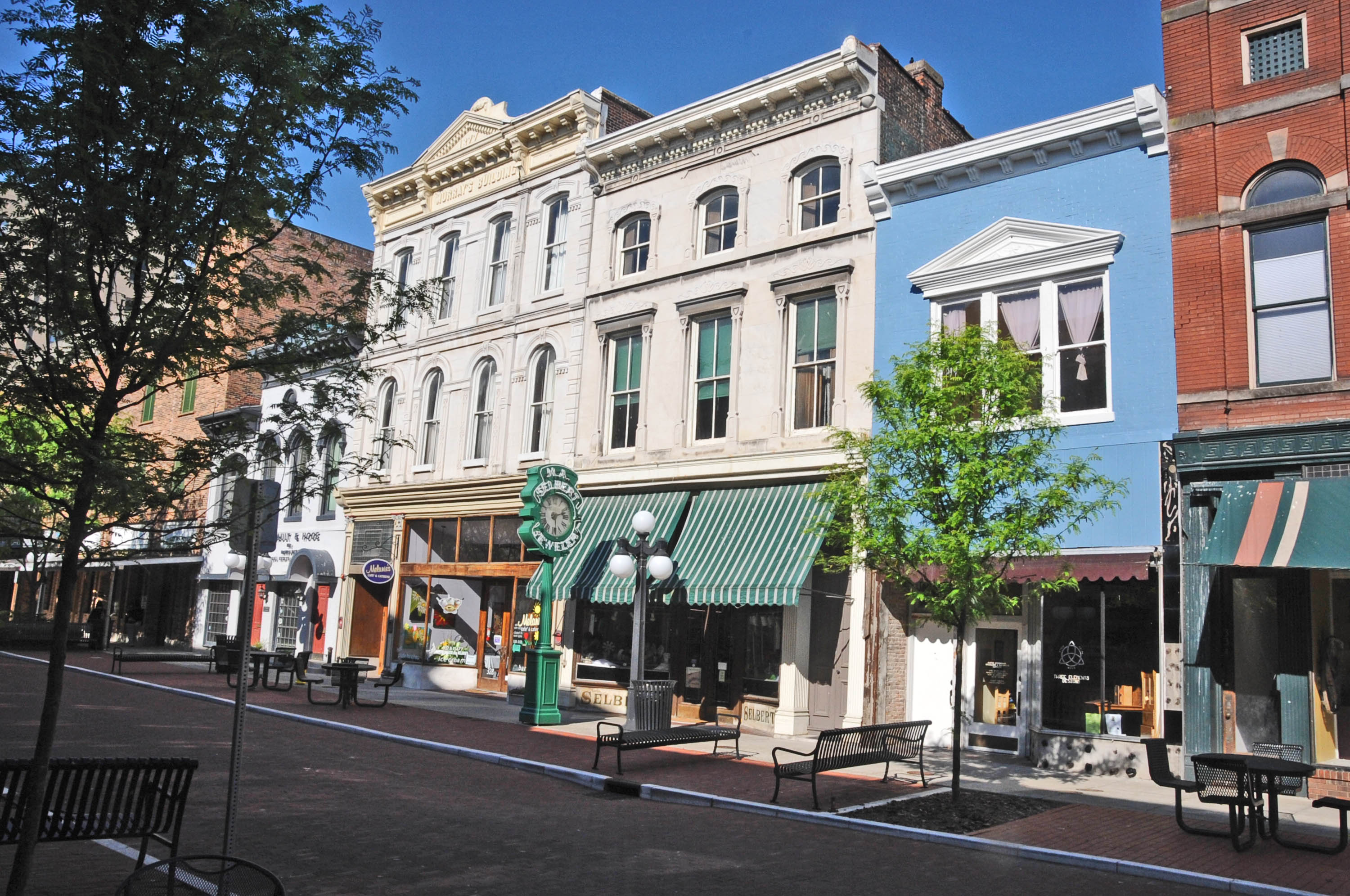

- Location within Kentucky Location within the United States
- Location: Roughly bounded by Broadway, Blanton, St. Clair, Ann and High Sts., Frankfort, Kentucky
- Coordinates: 38°12′1″N 84°52′36″W
- Area: 27 acres (11 ha)
- Built: 1796
- Architect: Multiple
- Architectural style: Greek Revival, Federal, Gothic Revival, Italianate
- NRHP reference No.: 80001529
- Added to NRHP: June 19, 1980

The Old Statehouse Historic District is an area in downtown Frankfort, Kentucky near the old State Capitol and the Old Governors Mansion. The area is bounded by Broadway Street, Blanton Street, St. Clair Street, Ann Street and High Street and contains 74 historic buildings. The historic district was added to the United States National Register of Historic Places in 1980.

The district "represents an old, stable, and diversified middle-class neighborhood whose residents have serviced the government and the city throughout its existence."

The district includes:

- the Old State Capitol (1827–30), "a hexastyle structure built of local stone" designed by Gideon Shryock, separately listed on the National Register in 1971;
- St. John's A.M.E. Church
- First Baptist Church (1904), Clinton St., whose congregation was formed of black members in 1833 out of what is now the First Baptist Church on St. Clair.

The district was entirely included and subsumed in the Central Frankfort Historic District, which was created in 2009. The larger district's nomination included additional information regarding the Old Statehouse Historic District's area.

== See also ==
- Central Frankfort Historic District
