= The State Journal =

The State Journal may refer to:

== Newspapers ==
- The State Journal (Kentucky)
- The State Journal (West Virginia)
- The State Journal-Register (Illinois)

=== Similarly named ===
- Idaho State Journal
- Lansing State Journal (Michigan)
- North State Journal (North Carolina)
- Wisconsin State Journal
