= Fayette Hewitt =

American lawyer

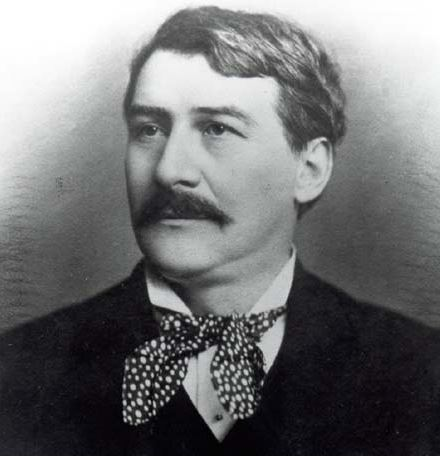
- Fayette Hewitt circa 1880
- Born: Lafayette Hewitt; 15 October 1831; Hodgenville, Kentucky, US
- Died: 26 January 1909 (aged 77)
- Occupation: Kentucky State Auditor
- Years active: 1880-1889
- Captain
- Allegiance: Confederate States of America
- Branch: Confederate States Army
- Service years: 1861-1865
- Rank: Captain, Assistant Adjutant-General
- Conflicts: American Civil War

Fayette Hewitt (15 October 1831 – 26 January 1909) was an American educator, postmaster, Confederate captain serving as assistant adjutant to several brigadier generals, appointed a quarter-master of the Kentucky militia in post-bellum Kentucky under Governor John W. Stevenson, elected Kentucky State Auditor serving from 1880 to 1889, and then a financier, including serving as president of the State National Bank of Frankfort.

== Early life ==
Lafayette "Fayette" Hewitt was born in Hodgenville, Kentucky, the eldest son of Eliza Ann Chastain and Robert Hewitt. His father came to Kentucky in 1829 and took a teaching job at Hodgenville. There he married a local Methodist minister's daughter, Eliza Ann Chastain on 1 July 1830. He moved his family to his wife's hometown, Elizabethtown in the early 1830s where he became principal of the Hardin Academy, established in 1806. Lafayette Hewitt was 18 when his father died and he took over managing the Hardin Academy for eight years. At some point in this time period, the school was expanded to include a female seminary called the Elizabethtown Female Academy. Hewitt moved to Louisiana to improve his health where in 1859 he was appointed by Postmaster General Joseph Holt to a position in his department in Washington.

== Military career ==
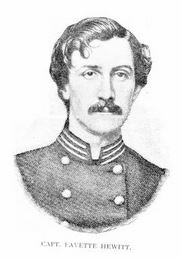

He left the desk job in Montgomery, Alabama to enter the Confederate States Army in December 1861 as assistant adjutant-general, with the rank of captain. He worked for General Albert Pike; then when Pike resigned, he was assistant adjutant for Major General Thomas C. Hindman, Holmes and Walker in the Trans-Mississippi Department. In March 1863 he was appointed to serve on the staff of Gen. John C. Breckinridge and then to the staff of Gen. Benjamin Hardin Helm of the First Kentucky Brigade, commonly known as the Orphan Brigade. He served with the First Kentucky Brigade until the end of the war.

== Political career ==
In May 1865 he returned to Kentucky and began working as principal at the Elizabethtown Female Seminary.

He was unable to pursue a law practice until after the repatriation law was repealed by the Kentucky General Assembly. In October 1867 he was commissioned by Governor John W. Stevenson to serve as quartermaster-general of the Kentucky militia. In this role, he recovered millions of dollars from the federal government the cost in arming and equipping Kentucky's Union soldiers. He was elected state auditor in 1879, serving for 10 years, being twice re-elected. Hewitt was censured by the General Assembly in 1888 for neglecting the duty of his office, but was not implicated in the theft of public funds by the state treasurer, James "Honest Dick" Tate, or his disappearance.

Meanwhile, in 1887 Hewitt donated to the U.S. War Department all the documents for the First Kentucky Brigade that he had kept since 1865. There were over twenty volumes of record books, morning reports, letter-copy books as well as thousands of individual orders and reports - now archived in the National Archives. Hewitt was also active in various Confederate Veteran activities. Ed Porter Thompson, a member of the 6th Kentucky Mounted Infantry in the First Kentucky Brigade and Kentucky Superintendent of Public Instruction, used Hewitt's papers as the basis of his history of the brigade as early as 1868. By 1882, they began holding annual reunions, the first being held at the Blue Lick Springs Hotel in Robertson County that year. That was followed by reunions in Lexington in 1883, Elizabethtown in 1884, Glasgow in 1885, Cynthiana in 1886, Bardstown in 1887, Frankfort in 1888, Louisville in 1889, Lawrenceburg in 1890, Owensboro in 1891, Paris in 1892, Versailles in 1893, Russellville in 1894, Bowling Green in 1895, and finally Nashville, Tennessee in 1896.

At the end of his term in 1889 he did not run for re-election and accepted the presidency of the State National Bank of Frankfort. He also served as president of the Frankfort Safety Vault & Trust Company since its organization, and general manager of the Kentucky Investment & Building Association.

In February 1904, while attending a talk by suffragist Laura Clay about the bills for women's rights currently under debate in the Kentucky General Assembly, Hewitt joined up as a new member of the Frankfort Equal Rights Association.

== Death ==
When he died in Frankfort on 26 January 1909, he was widely acclaimed for his many achievements. Hewitt was buried in the Elizabethtown City Cemetery, Elizabethtown, Kentucky.

== Honors ==
The Sons of Confederate Veterans (SCV) Camp in Frankfort was named in his honor. The Gen. Ben Hardin Helm Camp, SCV erected a Confederate marker at his grave in Elizabethtown in 1994.

== See also ==
- Orphan Brigade
- Corner in Celebrities Historic District, Frankfort, Kentucky
