= Anne Elizabeth Wilson =

American writer

Anne Elizabeth Blochin
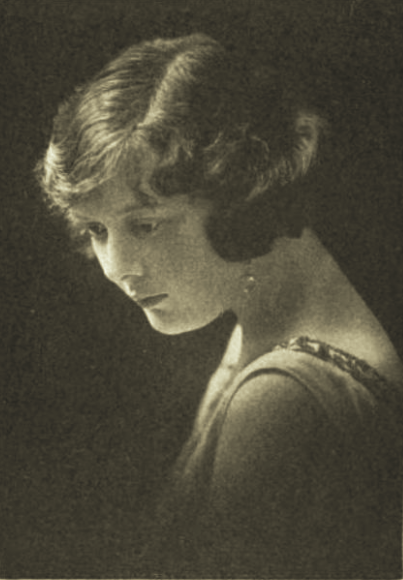
- Born: Anne Elizabeth Wilson; November 28, 1901; Frankfort, Kentucky, U.S.
- Died: October 17, 1946 (aged 44); Toronto, Canada
- Resting place: Aurora Cemetery, Aurora, Ontario, Canada
- Education: Convents of the Sacred Heart and Holy Child; Model School; Erasmus Hall; Barnard College
- Occupations: non-fiction writer; poet; editor
- Spouse: Victor Paulovich Blochin (m. 1929)
- Parent: Robert Burns Wilson
- Relatives: Thomas Nelson Page
- Writing career
- Language: English
- Notable work: Eager Footsteps

Signature
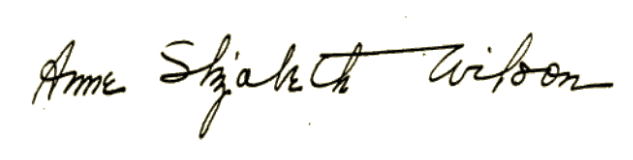

Anne Elizabeth Wilson (after marriage, Blochin; November 28, 1901 – October 17, 1946) was a 20th-century American-born Canadian writer of poetry and short stories, which appeared in Canada, England, and the United States. She was also a magazine and book editor. Wilson and her husband, Victor Blochin resided at Silverdale Farm, south of Aurora, Ontario, where their "Happy Woodland" pet cemetery, opened in 1934, was believed to be the first of its kind in Canada. Wilson died in 1946.

== Early life and education ==
Anne Elizabeth Wilson was born in Frankfort, Kentucky, November 28, 1901. She was the daughter of Robert Burns Wilson, a poet-painter of Virginia and Kentucky, and Anne (Hendrick) Wilson, a concert singer, and daughter of General William Jackson Hendrick, a former Attorney General of Kentucky. The family removed from Kentucky to New York in 1904. She was a granddaughter of William Jackson Hendrick, former Attorney General of Kentucky, and was a second cousin of Thomas Nelson Page.

Her education was acquired at the Convents of the Sacred Heart and Holy Child, New York City; the Model School and Erasmus Hall, Brooklyn; and Barnard College, New York.

== Career ==
Even from early childhood, Wilson seems to have had a literary bent, taking a prize for a short story in McCall's when she was only ten years old. In her early teens, she studied seriously for the stage, but delicate health obliged her to forego that career. She then turned her attention to literary work. Her poems and stories appeared in the well-known literary magazines of both countries. In the fall of 1924, her first book of poems, Eager Footsteps, appeared in Canada, the United States and England. For the greater part, Eager Footsteps was a reprint of poems contributed by Wilson from time to time to various newspapers. There was nothing distinctively Canadian in any of her verse; her poems were a criticism of life. Of the book Dr. John Daniel Logan remarked:— "On the whole, or even through and through, Eager Footsteps is rare psychology, rare art and rare beauty—a wholly novel and lovely contribution to modern poetry."

Wilson held several editorial positions, including: associate editor, Canadian Homes & Gardens; associate editor; Mayfair, editor, Chatelaine; literary editor, Hodder & Stoughton Ltd., Toronto; literary editor, Musson Book Company, Toronto; and women's editor, Maclean's.

In 1924, Wilson wrote a lyric set to music by her aunt, Jacqueline Hoyt, to be introduced to a convention of dancing masters in New York, in the hope that a brand new dance step would evolve, based on an old triplet caprice.

Wilson shared an intense interest in spiritualism with author Jenny O'Hara Pincock and publisher Ellen Elliott.

== Personal life ==
On July 6, 1929, at St. Thomas, Ontario, she married Victor Paulovich Blochin (c. 1890- 1978), of Aurora, Ontario, a Russian barrister, and former lieutenant in the Imperial Russian Grenadier Artillery.

The Blochins resided at Silverdale Farm, south of Aurora, where Victor bred West Highland White Terriers at his Bencruachan Kennels. Their farm also included a rough-hewn stone house, a silver fox ranch, and housing for 1,600 hens and chickens. The farm's grounds also contained "Happy Woodland" pet cemetery, complete with tombstones marking dog, cat, horse, monkey, and bird graves.

Following a lengthy illness, Anne Elizabeth Wilson Blochin died at St. Michael's Hospital, Toronto, October 17, 1946. Interment was in Aurora Cemetery. Archival holdings are held by the Acadia University, Library and Archives Canada, McMaster University, and University of Toronto.

== Selected works ==
- The Cookery Kitten (1920)
- Young Folks Dialogues. Edited by A.E. Wilson (1922)
- Canadian Treasury Reciter. Edited by A.E. Wilson (1922)
- Eager Footsteps (1924)
- The Bachelor Rabbit (1933)
- That Dog of Yours (1941)
