= First Presbyterian Church (Lexington, Kentucky) =

- First Presbyterian Church, Lexington
- U.S. National Register of Historic Places
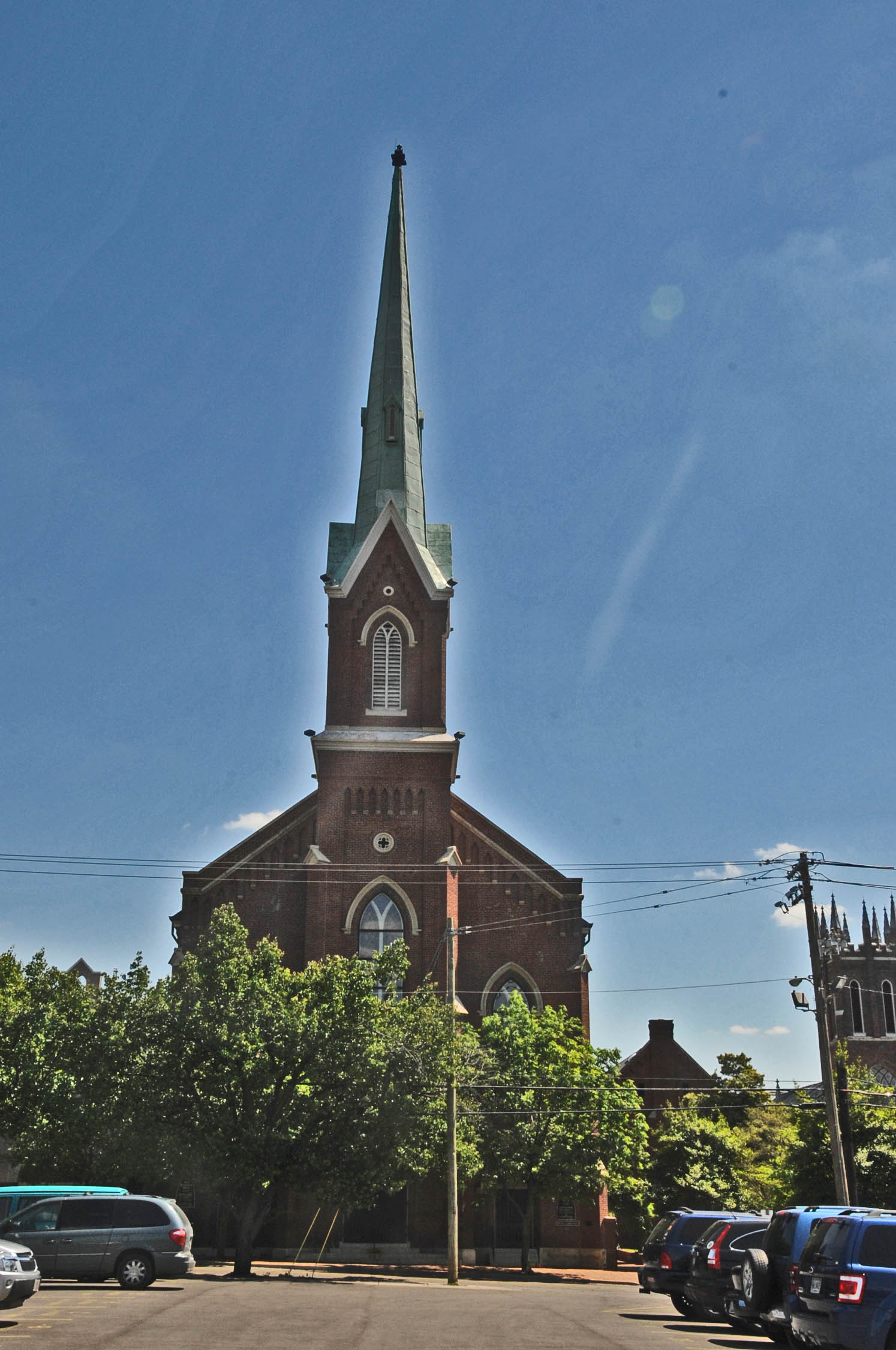

- Location within Kentucky Location within the United States
- Location: 174 N. Mill St., Lexington, Kentucky
- Coordinates: 38°2′57″N 84°29′49″W
- Area: 0.5 acres (0.20 ha)
- Built: 1874
- Architect: Cincinnatus Shryock
- Architectural style: Gothic Revival
- NRHP reference No.: 74000861
- Added to NRHP: December 30, 1974

The First Presbyterian Church in Lexington, Kentucky is a historic church at 171 Market Street. The church was designed by the important Lexington architect Cincinnatus Shryock who was also an elder at First Church.

The original congregational name was the Mount Zion Church, founded in 1784, making it one of the oldest churches in Lexington, KY. The name was changed when they moved to the present day building in 1874.

It was added to the National Register of Historic Places in 1974.

== Architecture ==
Cincinnatus Shryock graduated from Transylvania University in Lexington, Kentucky. His family is well known for their architecture in Kentucky. One of the most famous buildings done in his family was by Gideon of the Old State Capital building in Frankfort, Kentucky.

The First Presbyterian Church has a Gothic style with a large tower in the front made with a copper spire. It also includes stained glass throughout the tall tower and around the rest of the building. At the time it as created, it was an important piece of architecture in the Lexington skyline.

== See also ==
- National Register of Historic Places listings in Kentucky
