= McAdams and Morford Building =

- U.S. National Register of Historic Places
- U.S. Historic district – Contributing property
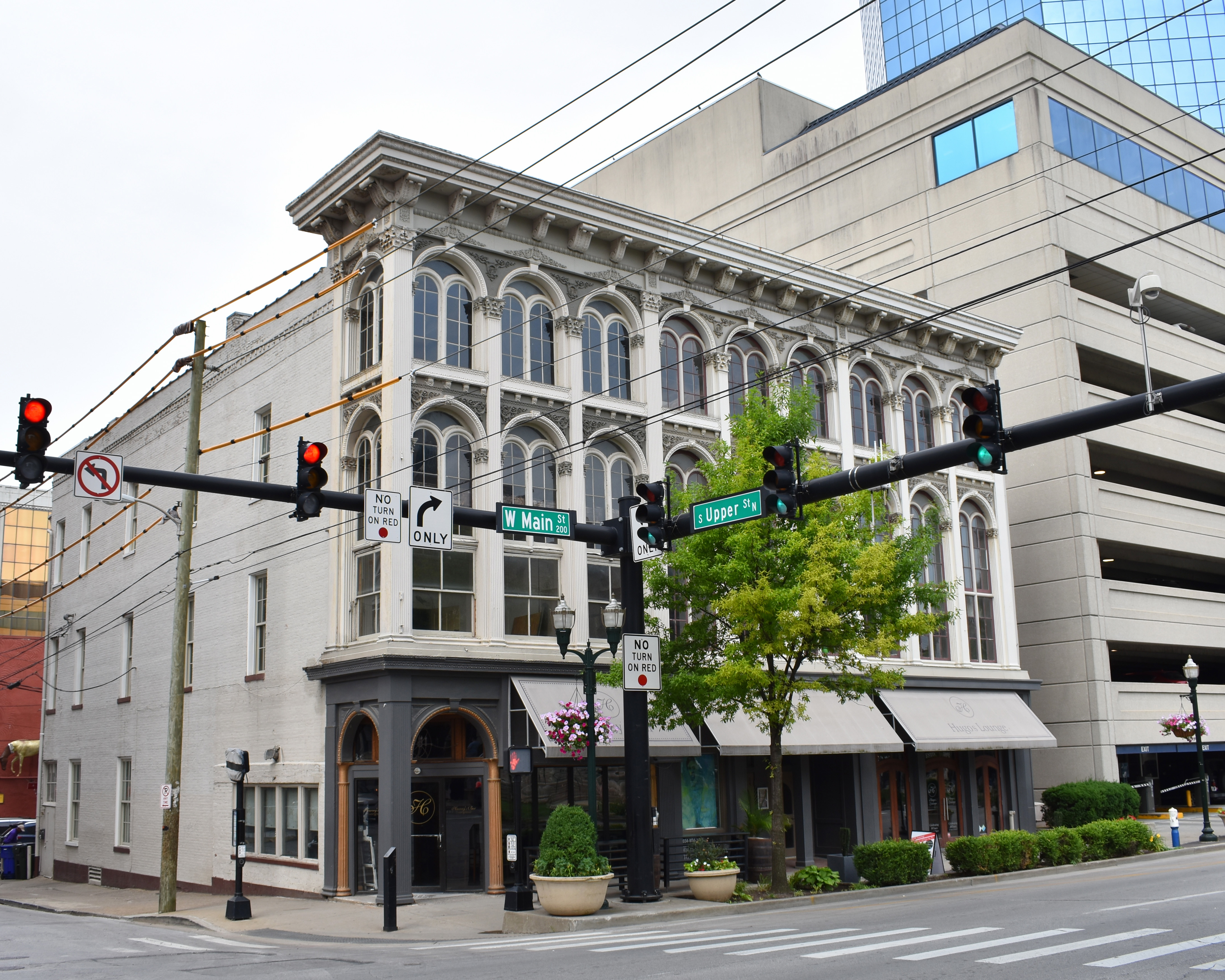
- The McAdams & Morford Building in 2019

- Location within Kentucky Location within the United States
- Location: 200--210 W. Main St., Lexington, Kentucky
- Coordinates: 38°02′50″N 84°29′54″W
- Area: less than one acre
- Built: 1849
- Architectural style: Italian Renaissance
- Part of: Downtown Commercial District (ID83000559)
- NRHP reference No.: 73000799

Significant dates
- Added to NRHP: October 25, 1973
- Designated CP: August 25, 1983

The McAdams and Morford Building in Lexington, Kentucky, also known as the Melodeon Hall, is a 3-story commercial building constructed in 1849. An Italianate cast iron facade was added after 1857. Druggists McAdams & Morford occupied a corner space in the building 1898–1994.

The building was home to Lexington's Melodeon Hall, a theater and meeting space with seating for 300 patrons. Robert Jefferson Breckinridge addressed a gathering at the Melodeon in 1861, and his remarks helped to preserve Kentucky as a Union state during the American Civil War, although Kentucky maintained separate Union and Confederate state governments during the war.

The University of Kentucky (Transylvania University) Commercial College occupied the building for 35 years under the direction of Wilbur R. Smith. In 1908 the college was incorporated separately from the university as the Wilbur R. Smith Business College.

In 2017 a vehicle damaged the building, and repair workers uncovered arches from the cast iron facade that had been hidden by previous remodeling.

The McAdams and Morford logo appears on the cover of the 2000 album The Sickness from the nu-metal group, Disturbed.
