= Monsieur Giron's Confectionery =

- U.S. National Register of Historic Places
- U.S. Historic district – Contributing property
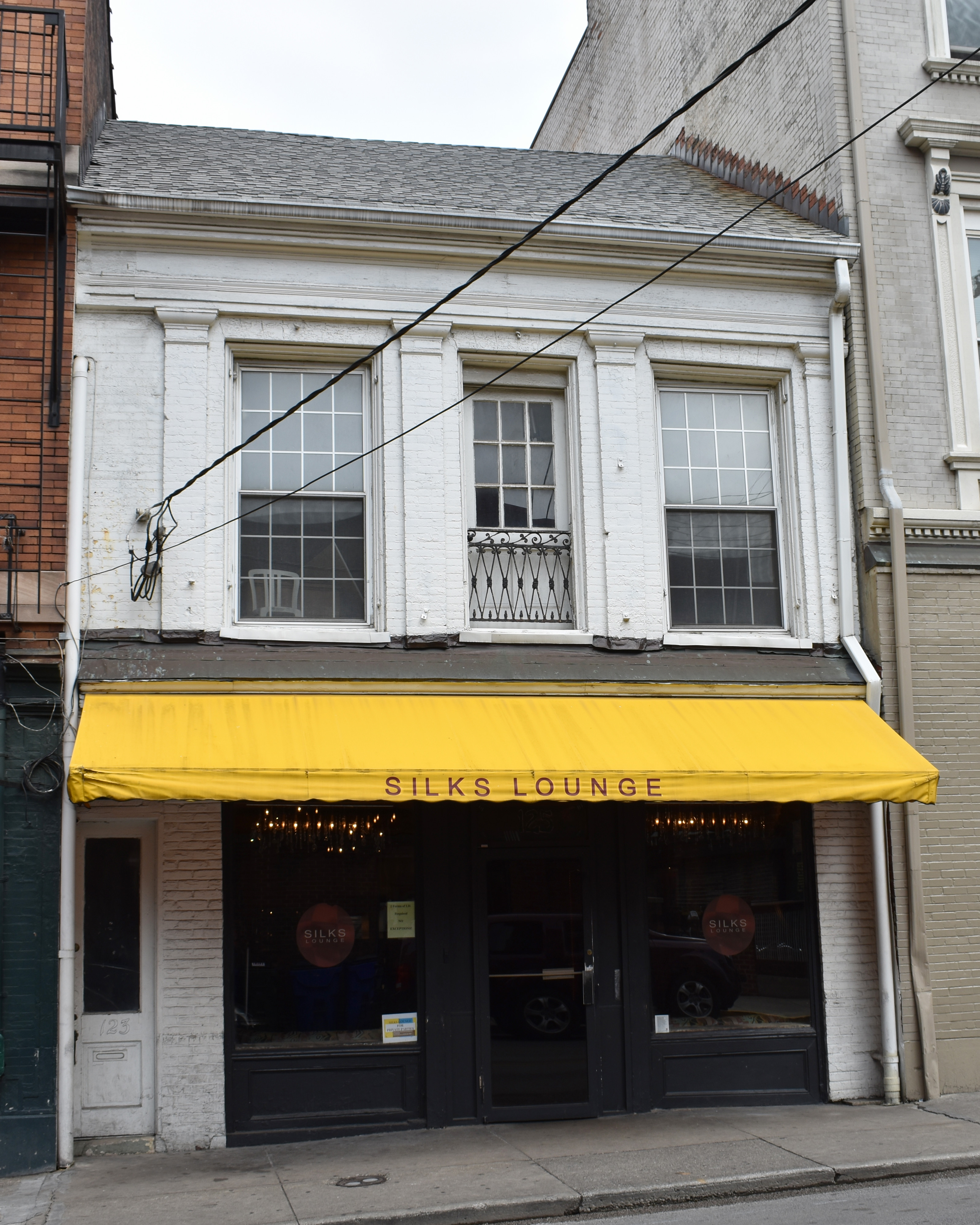
- Monsieur Giron's Confectionery in 1972

- Location within Kentucky Location within the United States
- Location: 125 N. Mill St., Lexington, Kentucky
- Coordinates: 38°02′55″N 84°29′55″W
- Area: less than one acre
- Built: 1829
- Architectural style: Greek Revival
- Part of: Downtown Commercial District (ID83000559)
- NRHP reference No.: 74000866

Significant dates
- Added to NRHP: December 27, 1974
- Designated CP: August 25, 1983

Monsieur Giron's Confectionery in Lexington, Kentucky, is a two-story Greek Revival building constructed of brick in 1829. The building replaced an earlier wood frame building at the site, also occupied by Monsieur Giron's Confectionery. A 50-ft ballroom on the second floor was partitioned by folding doors into two spaces. Originally seven bays wide, only three bays in the north half of the building remain. The building's remnant was added to the National Register of Historic Places (NRHP) in 1974.

== Noteworthy visitors ==
Giron entertained General Lafayette at the Mill Street confectionery in 1825, and Giron's cook, Dominique Ritter, made a celebrated cake for the occasion.

Mary Todd Lincoln was thought to have been one of the confectionery's best customers.

== History ==
French immigrant Mathurin Giron arrived in Lexington in the early 19th century, and in 1812 he advertised for an apprentice to learn the confectionery business.

Giron purchased the confectionery from Henry Terrass, owner of a wood frame building on Mill Street with an upstairs ballroom, and the business included "the yellow framed house on Main Street." Giron partnered briefly with H.I.I. Robert in 1814 under the name M. Giron & H. Robert. The partnership operated at two locations, with Giron at the Mill Street site and Robert in charge of the Main Street branch.

John Darrac organized a dancing school at the ballroom in 1815, with a "practizing (sic) ball every other week." Darrac also taught French language lessons. By 1819 the dancing school was operated by Henry Guibert, and in 1820 the school was taught by Mr. Schaffer.

The ballroom also was used for dinners, lectures, and political gatherings.

Giron advertised for apprentices in 1836. In 1840 Mr. Richardson advertised his dancing school, and by that time Giron may not have been involved with the ballroom. Giron retired from the confectionery in 1844.

== See also ==
- Callas Sweet Shop: NRHP listing in Owensboro, Kentucky
- National Register of Historic Places listings in Fayette County, Kentucky
