= Liberty Hall (Frankfort, Kentucky) =

Historic house museum in Kentucky, US

- U.S. National Register of Historic Places
- U.S. National Historic Landmark
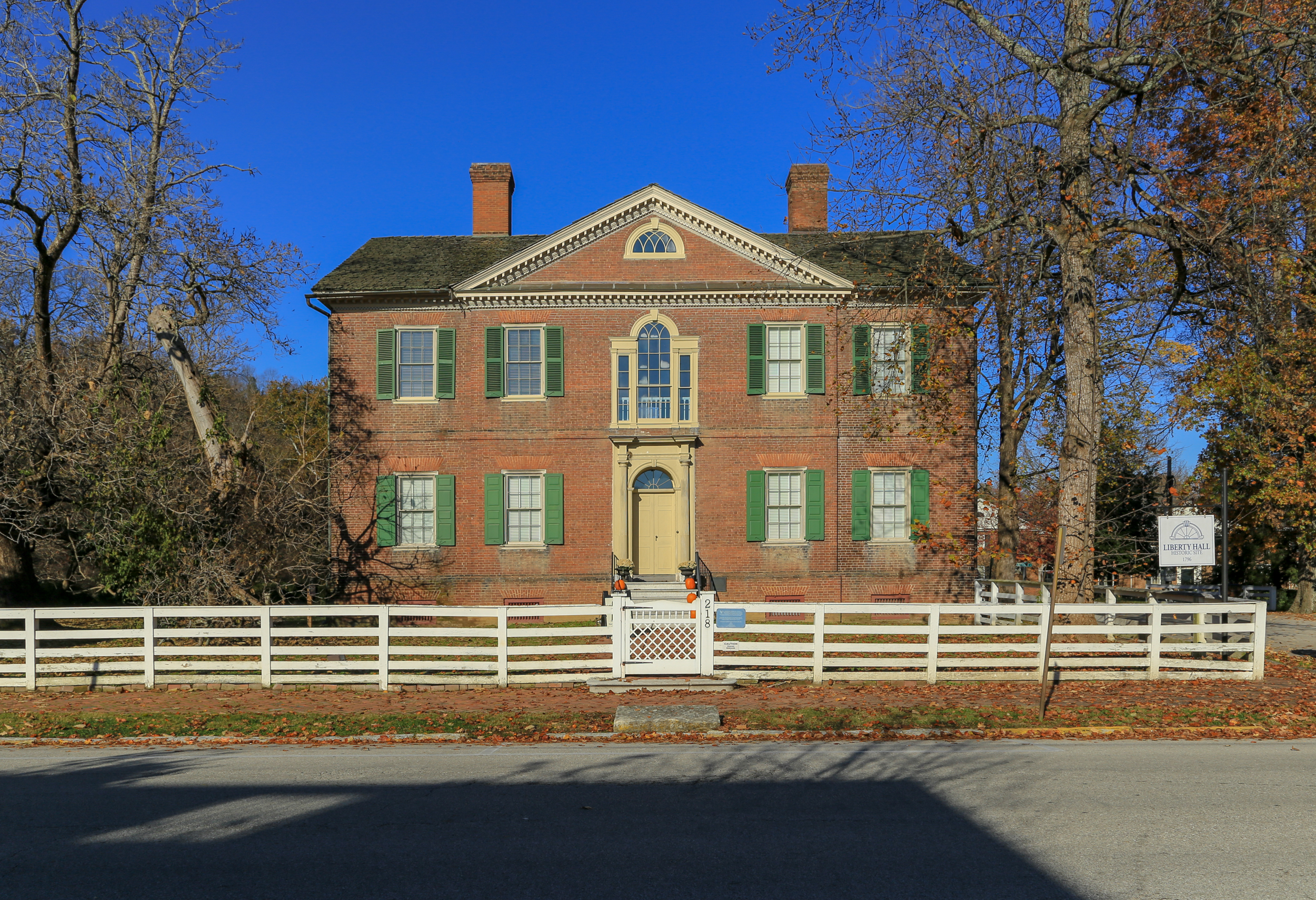
- Liberty Hall, 2018

- Location within Kentucky Location within the United States
- Location: 218 Wilkinson St., Frankfort, Kentucky
- Coordinates: 38.1998°N 84.88117°W
- Area: 2 acres (0.81 ha)
- Built: 1796
- Architectural style: Federal
- NRHP reference No.: 71000344

Significant dates
- Added to NRHP: November 11, 1971
- Designated NHL: November 11, 1971

Liberty Hall is a historic house museum at 218 Wilkinson Street in Frankfort, Kentucky. Built 1796–1800 by American statesman John Brown, it was designated in 1971 as a U.S. National Historic Landmark for its association with Brown and its fine Federal-style architecture.

== Description ==
Liberty Hall is located west of downtown Frankfort, at the southwest corner of Wilkinson and West Main Streets, overlooking the Kentucky River. It is a two-story five-bay brick house whose main section is 60 by 46 feet (18 m × 14 m) in plan; it has a two-story rear ell which is 24.3 by 43.6 feet (7.4 m × 13.3 m) in plan.

== History ==
The documented history of Liberty Hall Historic Site can be traced back to 1786, when General James Wilkinson purchased much of the land that is downtown Frankfort. Wilkinson laid out the town, naming the streets for friends, famous people and places, and himself. Some of Wilkinson's original streets, Wilkinson, Wapping, and Montgomery (now Main), form the boundaries of three of the four sides of Liberty Hall Historic Site. Wilkinson sold the tract that includes Liberty Hall to Frankfort resident Andrew Holmes. In 1796, Holmes sold the four acres to Senator John Brown.

Brown began construction of a home on the property shortly after purchasing it, though he was often away on government business in Philadelphia, then the capital of the United States. The architect of Liberty Hall is unknown, although Brown may have done some of the design. One of the earliest brick homes in Frankfort, this structure was made from bricks fired locally from clay dug from the cellar. The construction continued until 1800 when the house was substantially complete. It lacked only the glass windows, which were added in 1804. In addition to the main house, several dependent structures were built on the property, including a kitchen and laundry, smokehouse, a privy, stables, carriage house, and slave quarters.

In 1835 John Brown divided his property so that his sons would have equal inheritance. His elder son, Mason, inherited Liberty Hall. For his younger son, Orlando, Brown hired Gideon Shryock, designer of the Kentucky State Capitol, to design a new house. Constructed in the Greek Revival style, the Orlando Brown House was built by local contractor Harrison Blanton. The entire project cost $5,000.

In 1934, Mary Mason Scott, John Brown's great-granddaughter and the last resident of Liberty Hall, died; she left Liberty Hall to her brother, John Matthew Scott. He sold Liberty Hall to a group of concerned citizens who had formed Liberty Hall, Inc., a nonprofit organization to preserve the historic building. They opened the house as a museum in 1937.

The Orlando Brown House was occupied until 1955. Anne Hord Brown, Orlando Brown's last remaining descendant, left the house to the National Society of the Colonial Dames of America in the Commonwealth of Kentucky (NSCDA-KY). The Dames opened the house as a museum in 1955.

== Residents ==
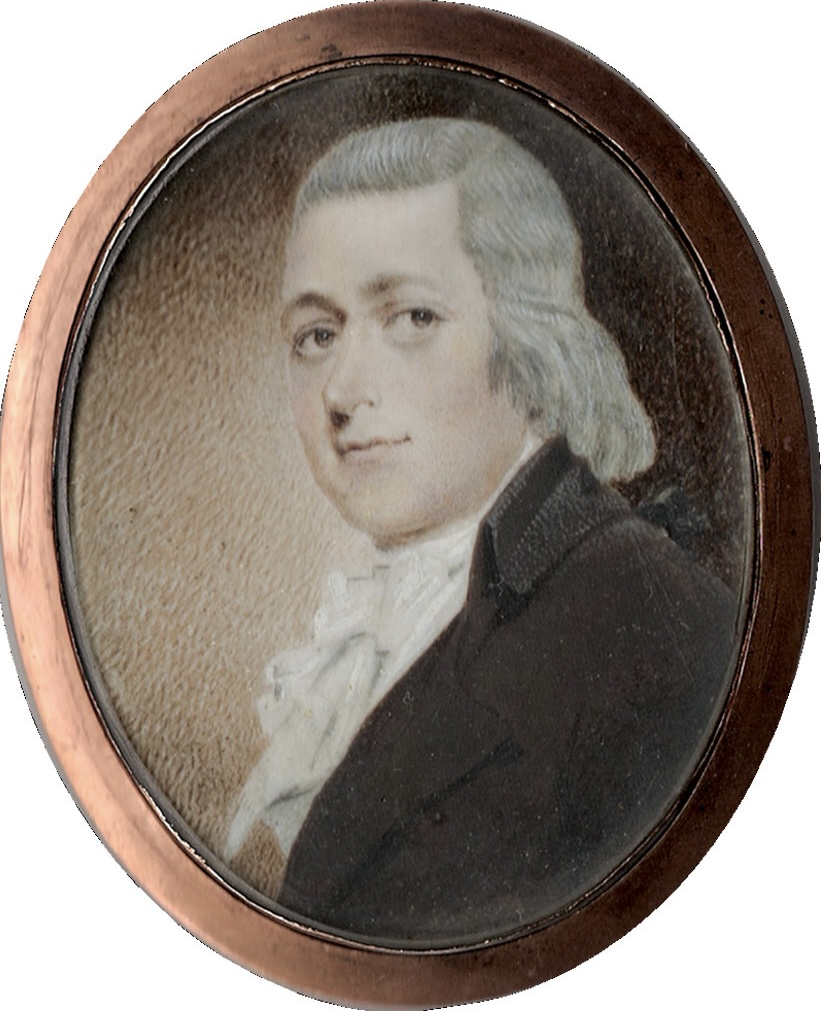
Senator John Brown miniature portrait

John Brown (September 12, 1757 – August 29, 1837) was a United States lawyer and statesman who was integral to creating the State of Kentucky. Before statehood he represented Virginia in the Continental Congress (1777–1778) and the U.S. Congress (1789–1791). While in Congress he introduced the bill granting statehood to Kentucky. Once that was accomplished, he was elected a U.S. Senator by the state legislature for Kentucky, a position he held until 1805.

Additionally, Liberty Hall has been the home of two other U.S. Senators, one Vice-Presidential candidate, one Governor of Missouri, one Commissioner of the Bureau of Indian Affairs, one Ambassador to France, one U.S. District Attorney, three U.S. Army colonels, two doctors, and one newspaper editor. It is the ancestral home of Margaret Wise Brown, a noted children's book author.

It was declared as a U.S. National Historic Landmark on November 11, 1971.

== Today ==
Today Liberty Hall and the adjacent Orlando Brown House are operated as a historic house museum and historic site. Tours of Liberty Hall are given Monday through Saturday from mid-March to mid-November. The site also hosts several special events and programs throughout the year. Liberty Hall Historic Site is owned and operated by National Society of the Colonial Dames of America in Kentucky.

== See also ==
- List of National Historic Landmarks in Kentucky
- Corner in Celebrities Historic District
- National Register of Historic Places listings in Franklin County, Kentucky
