= Callas Sweet Shop =

- U.S. National Register of Historic Places
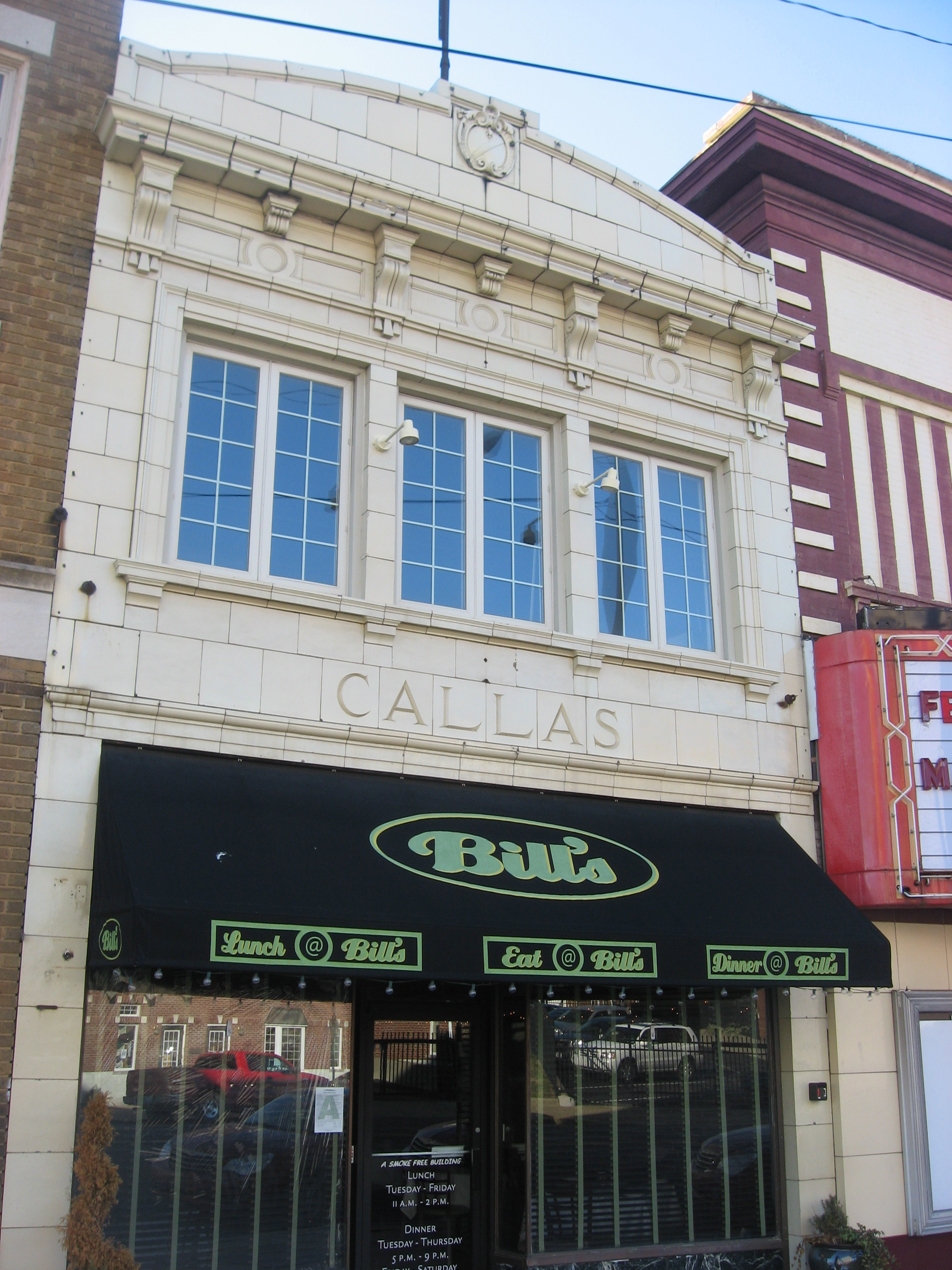

- Location within Kentucky Location within the United States
- Location: 420 Frederica Ave., Owensboro, Kentucky
- Coordinates: 37°46′19″N 87°06′49″W
- Area: 0.1 acres (0.040 ha)
- Built: 1921
- Architectural style: Beaux Arts
- MPS: Owensboro MRA
- NRHP reference No.: 86000661
- Added to NRHP: March 28, 1986

The Callas Sweet Shop, at 420 Frederica Ave. in Owensboro, Kentucky was built in Beaux Arts style in 1921. It was listed on the National Register of Historic Places in 1986.

Its National Register nomination termed it "elegant" and described it: "The buff color terra cotta and tile decorative elements, such as brackets, shields, and cornices, create a simple, classical appearance. Framed by tiled piers, the recessed storefront on the first floor retains its central entranceway and transom windows. The entranceway is flanked by large display windowsresting on marble panels. A modern steel awning runs above the display windows. The word CALLAS is carved into terracotta panels directly above the storefront. The second story is dominated by a row of three window bays. A slightly projecting tiled window surround frames all three of these bays. The second story is topped by a bracketed cornice resting on slightly project panels. The building front rises to a curvilinear parapet wall highlighted by a central ornamented shield. The interior retains the original counter and ice cream booths and the walls are covered with enlargements of postcards from the early 1900s showing early scenes of downtown Owensboro."

It was deemed significant as "having the only surviving example of complete terracotta tile fronts in downtown Owensboro. The building is especially refreshing because it lacks the overly elaborate detailing of many Beaux-Arts structures. The original owner was typical of European immigrants' families who came to Owensboro and operated [family businesses]. He came to Owensboro as a young man and his first job was shining shoes. His first shop was on Main St. in a rented building and called Progress Candy. In 1921 he built his Sweet Shop on Frederica, next door to the Empress Theater. When Callas' health failed, it was rented to Barney Elliott who added sandwiches to the menu. It is an Owensboro 'tradition'."

== See also ==
- Monsieur Giron's Confectionery Store: NRHP listing in Lexington, Kentucky
- National Register of Historic Places listings in Daviess County, Kentucky
