= First Baptist Church on St. Clair =

First Baptist Church
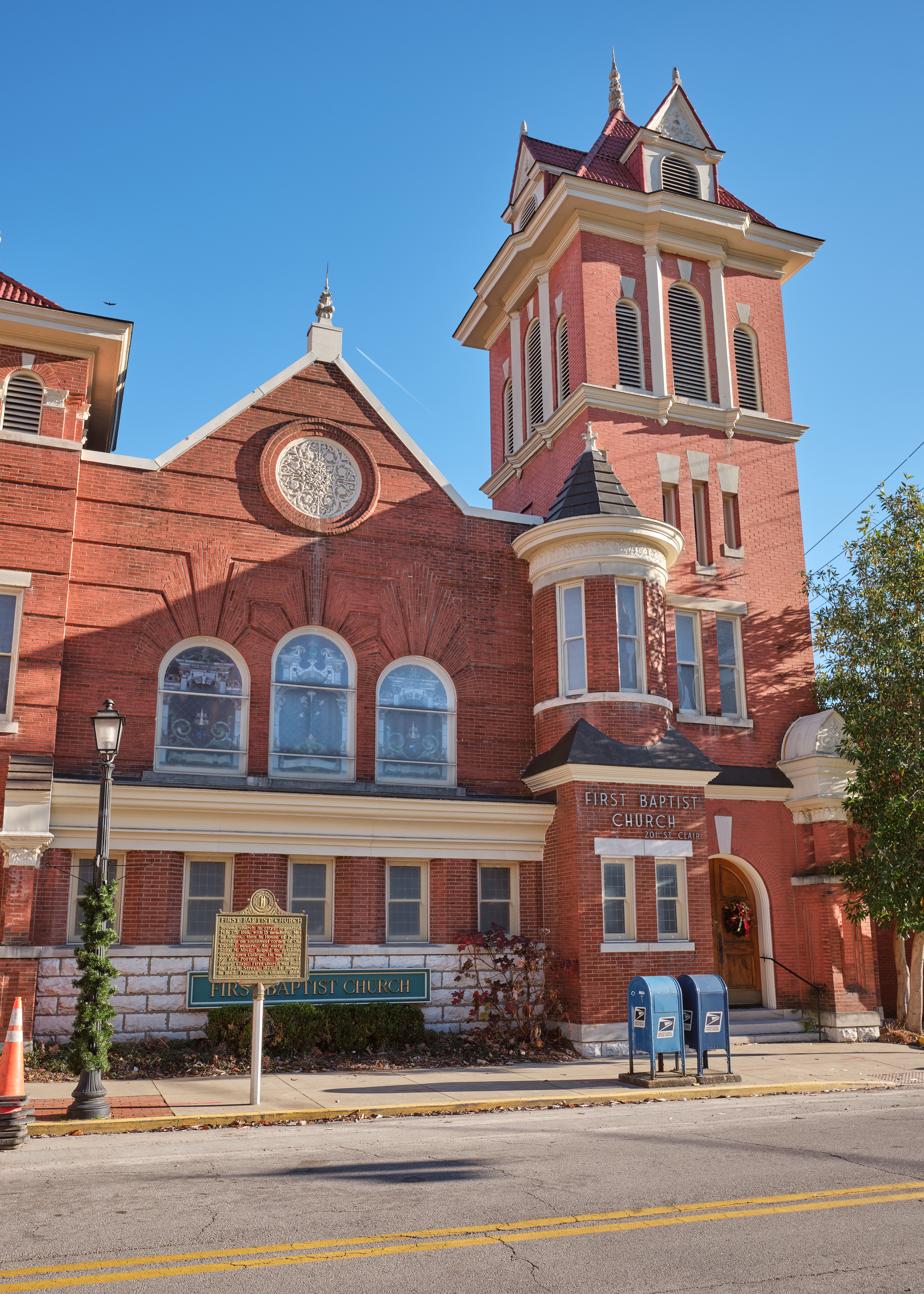
- Church Building at 201 St Clair Street, built 1868
- Formation: 1816
- Type: Cooperative Baptist Fellowship
- Location: 200 St. Clair Street, Frankfort, Kentucky
- Coordinates: 38.1974°N 84.8783°W
- Pastor: Rev. Amanda Smith, co-pastor, & Rev,. Justin Sizemore, co-pastor
- Website: http://www.fbcfrankfort.info

The First Baptist Church on St. Clair is a Baptist church in Frankfort, Kentucky. The church was founded in 1816, and the current building dates to 1868.

It has long been known as the First Baptist Church, also, but is not to be confused with the other First Baptist Church in Frankfort, on Clinton Street, which is a historically African-American congregation. The other church was founded in 1833 by black members from this church.

The Church was affiliated with the Southern Baptist Convention until September 24, 2000, when it removed itself over issues surrounding the Southern Baptist Convention conservative resurgence and the 2000 Baptist Faith and Message.
