= Walter Warfield Building =

- Warfield, Dr. Walter, Building
- U.S. National Register of Historic Places
- U.S. Historic district – Contributing property
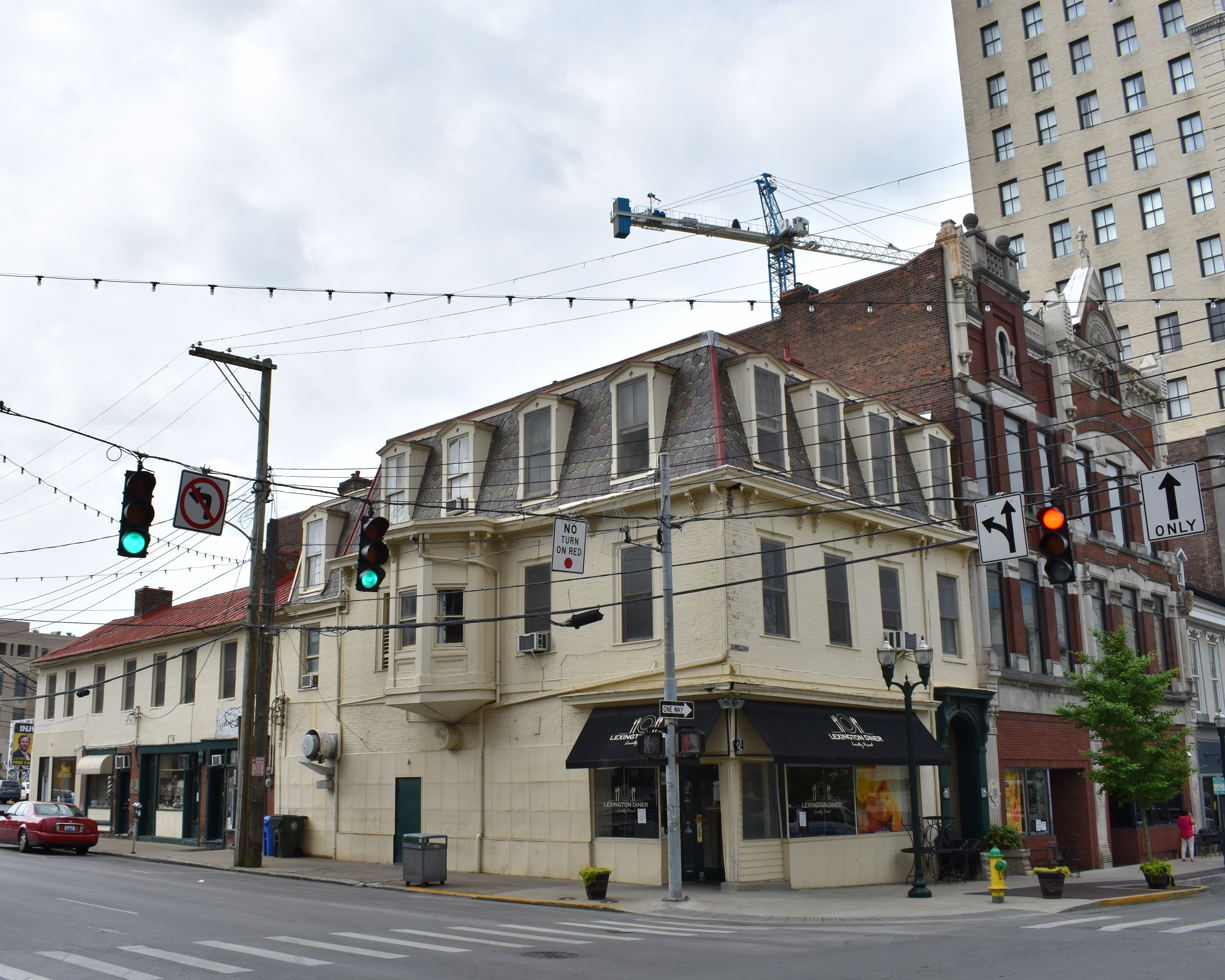
- The Walter Warfield Building in 2019

- Location within Kentucky Location within the United States
- Location: 122-124 N. Upper St. and 140-160 W. Short St., Lexington, Kentucky
- Coordinates: 38°02′50″N 84°29′50″W
- Area: 0.1 acres (0.040 ha)
- Built: 1806
- Architectural style: Second Empire, Georgian
- Part of: Downtown Commercial District (ID83000559)
- NRHP reference No.: 80001524

Significant dates
- Added to NRHP: August 11, 1980
- Designated CP: August 25, 1983

The Dr. Walter Warfield Building in Lexington, Kentucky, is a Second Empire or Georgian building constructed in 1806 on a corner of Jordan's Row, a string of buildings constructed or owned by John Jordan. Originally two stories, the brick building was expanded in 1870 with a third story that includes a Mansard roof and dormers. A later expansion added a 2-story annex to the building.

The building was constructed for Dr. Walter Warfield (June 17, 1760 – March 12, 1826), a physician who served in the Continental Army during the American Revolution and who was admitted as an original member of The Society of the Cincinnati in the state of Maryland. Warfield was a distant cousin of Elisha Warfield, both descendants of John Warfield (1672–1718) of Anne Arundel County, Maryland. Walter Warfield was a professor of midwifery in the medical department of Transylvania University in 1801, but his tenure may have been brief. Prior to construction of the Warfield Building, he practiced "physic and surgery" at the former offices of Samuel Brown and Elisha Warfield. In 1807 Walter Warfield purchased 27,500 acres of land in Montgomery County, although he may not have lived there. The previous owner had been John Jordan, namesake of Jordan's Row.
