= Cincinnatus Shryock =

American architect

Cincinnatus Shryock (1816 – 1888) was an American architect. A number of his works are listed on the U.S. National Register of Historic Places.

== Life and career ==
Shryock was born in 1816 in Lexington, Kentucky.

Shryock was born into a famous American architectural family. His father was the Kentucky architect and contractor Mathias Shryock and his brother, Gideon, also became a well-known architect in his own right.

He matriculated to Transylvania University in Lexington, whose campus now occupies the former site of his boyhood home, which had been built by his father. There he studied medicine, but left one term short of graduation. He was also known as a mathematician and designed his own telescope, and was known for his interests in music and literature.

Shryock's first experience as an architect involved the structural work for Morrison Chapel (now commonly known as "Old Morrison"), a Greek Revival structure designed by his brother Gideon, on the Transylvania campus, in 1833. After the building's completion, Gideon moved to Louisville, but Cincinnatus remained in Lexington, working as an employee of an architect named John McMurtry. Under McMurtry's tutelage, Shryock developed a taste for the Tudor Gothic and Gothic Revival styles, which were very popular during a series of revivals in architectural styles in the 19th century, particularly in Great Britain and the United States. During the 1840s and 1850s, McMurtry and Shryock's practice catered to wealthy Bluegrass landowners who fashioned themselves after Scottish knights from Sir Walter Scott's literature.

In the years immediately predating the American Civil War, Shryock and McMurtry broke off their business relationship, partly because the architectural business in Lexington had dwindled considerably. During the war, Shryock moved his family down the Kentucky River to operate a ferry. He exhibited some Confederate sympathies, aiding Southern troops to cross the Kentucky River and later attempting to delay Union troops from raiding the town of Lawrenceburg, Kentucky. At the conflict's close, he returned to Lexington to resume his practice.

Shryock's postwar practice prospered. He was engaged in the design of many period buildings, replete with mansard roofs, ornate gingerbread, and bay windows characteristic of Italianate buildings. One of Shryock's most notable buildings is the First Presbyterian Church in Lexington, a Gothic revival structure built in 1872 and located on North Mill Street. His work also figures prominently in the South Hill Historic District of Lexington. He died in 1888 in Lexington.

Shryock is buried in the Lexington Cemetery.

== Works ==
Works include:

- First Presbyterian Church (Lexington, Kentucky), 174 N. Mill St., Lexington, Kentucky, NRHP-listed
- Odd Fellows Temple (Lexington, Kentucky), 115-119 W. Main St., Lexington, Kentucky, NRHP-listed
- Old Central University, University Dr. on Eastern Kentucky University campus, Richmond, Kentucky, NRHP-listed
- One or more works in South Hill Historic District, roughly bounded by S. Broadway, W. High, S. Limestone, and Pine Sts., Lexington, Kentucky, NRHP-listed
