= Old United States Courthouse and Post Office (Frankfort, Kentucky) =

- Old U.S. Courthouse and Post Office
- U.S. National Register of Historic Places
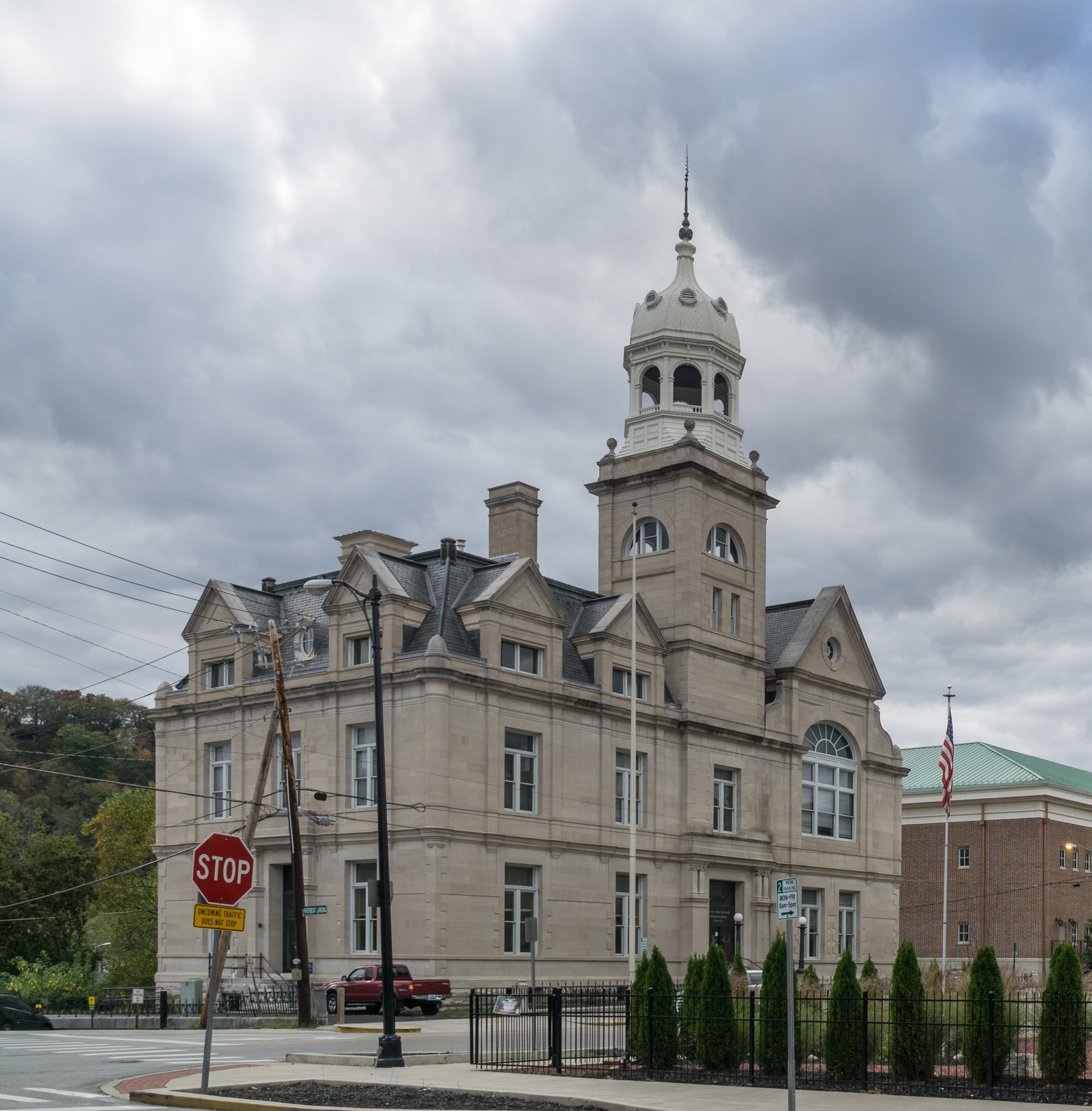

- Location within Kentucky Location within the United States
- Location: 305 Wapping St., Frankfort, Kentucky
- Coordinates: 38°11′51″N 84°52′43″W
- Built: 1883-87
- Architectural style: Renaissance, Chateauesque
- NRHP reference No.: 74000874
- Added to NRHP: July 3, 1974

The Old United States Courthouse and Post Office building is a former post office and courthouse of the United States federal courts in Frankfort, Kentucky. The building was listed on the National Register of Historic Places in 1974

== History ==
Built during 1883 to 1887, the structure housed the United States District Court for the District of Kentucky from then until 1901 and the United States District Court for the Eastern District of Kentucky from 1901 until it was succeeded.

It was expanded with a rear wing in 1910 at which time interior offices were modified as well, to serve as a post office, which it did until 1965. In 1965 it housed the Paul Sawyier Library until 2008 when the library moved to the brick building next door. Today it is Downtown Annex for Kentucky State University.

The building was listed on the National Register of Historic Places on June 3, 1974.

== Architecture ==
The limestone building with a steeply sloped slate roof was designed in the Second Empire and Châteauesque styles. It is a three-story 54 feet (16 m) by 94 feet (29 m) building built of masonry load-bearing walls with timber beams and trusses.

== Gallery ==
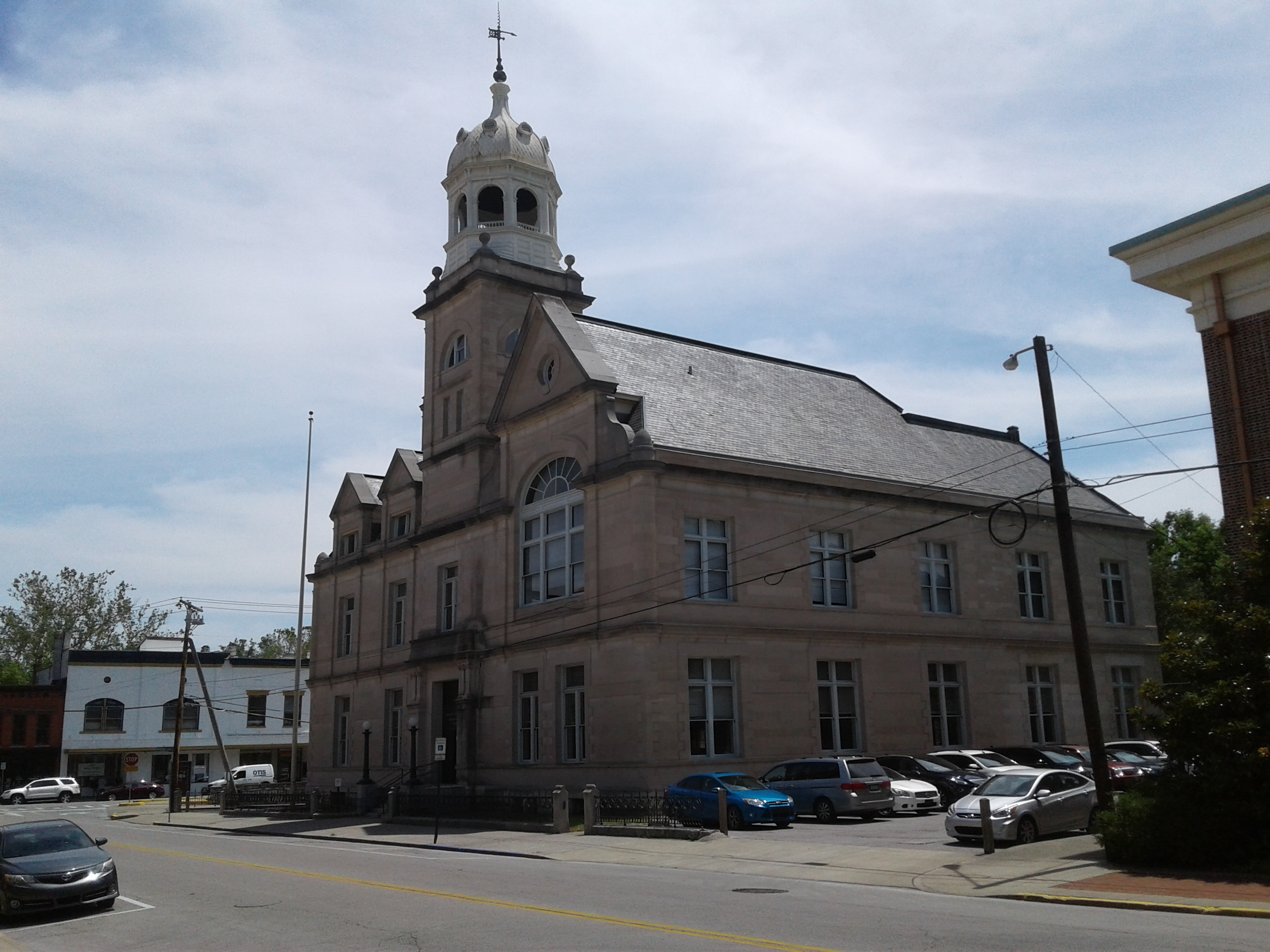

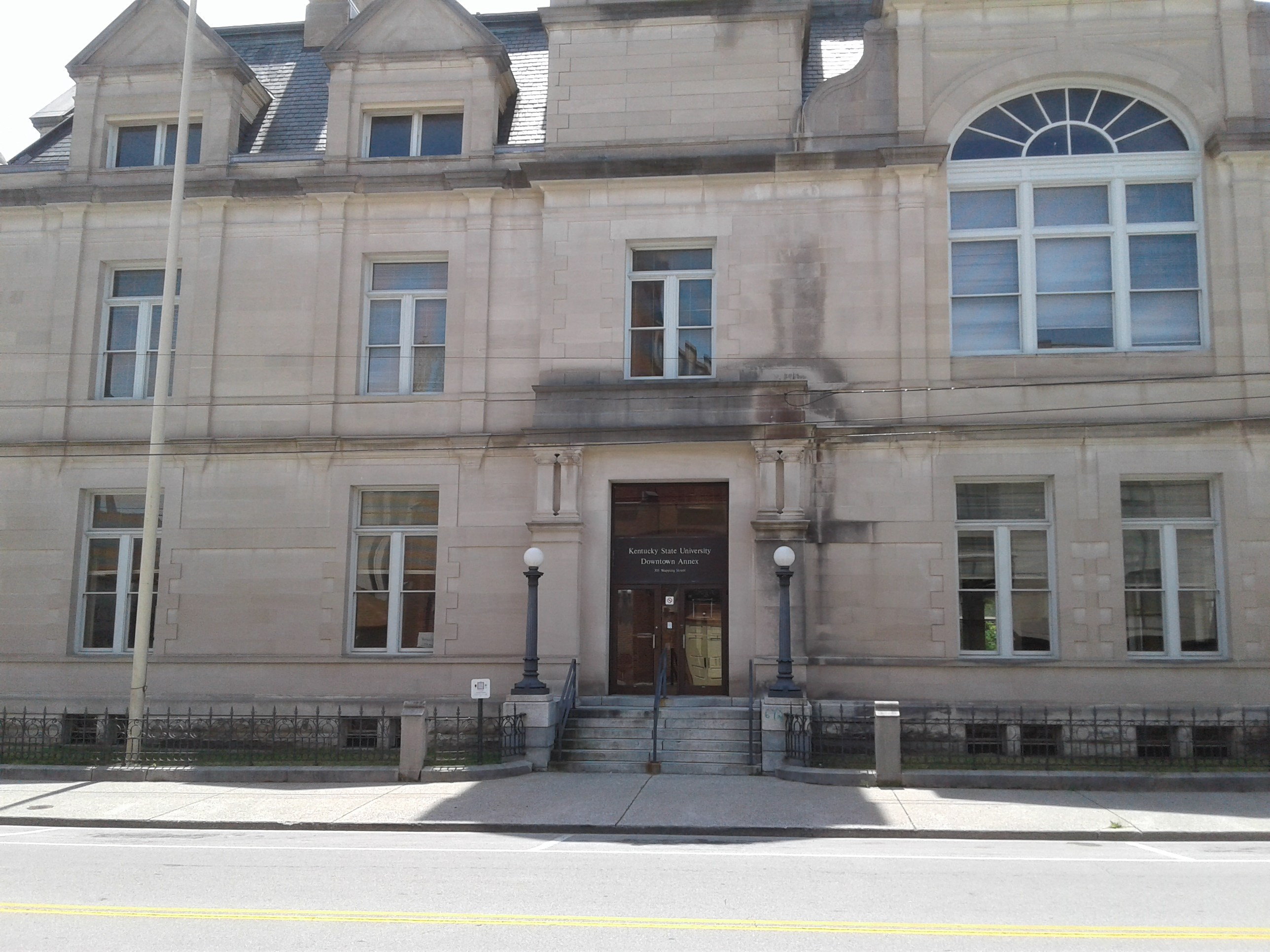

== See also ==
- National Register of Historic Places listings in Franklin County, Kentucky
- Corner in Celebrities Historic District
- List of United States post offices
