= Mathias Shryock =

American architect

Mathias or Matthias Shryock (born near Frederick, Maryland, 1774 – died in Lexington, Kentucky, 1833) was an early American architect and building contractor.

== Life and career ==
Shryock was born in Maryland, where he married in 1798, but moved to Kentucky, eventually settling in Lexington. He built his family's home on the site of what is now Transylvania University.

In 1814, Shryock designed the first Episcopal church in Lexington, as well as many homes. Around the years 1818 to 1820, he built what is now known as the Mary Todd Lincoln House, which was purchased by her father, Robert S. Todd, in 1832.

== Personal life and death ==
He was the father of two other American architects: Gideon (1802 – 1880) and Cincinnatus (1816 – 1888), both of whom were born in Lexington and achieved fame in their own right, particularly within Kentucky. According to one Kentucky Department of Highways plaque, the "[b]est known surname in Kentucky architecture is Shryock." In all, Mathias Shryock fathered a total of ten children.

Shryock died of cholera and is buried in Lexington, Kentucky.

== See also ==
- List of American architects
