= Robert Burns Wilson =

American painter

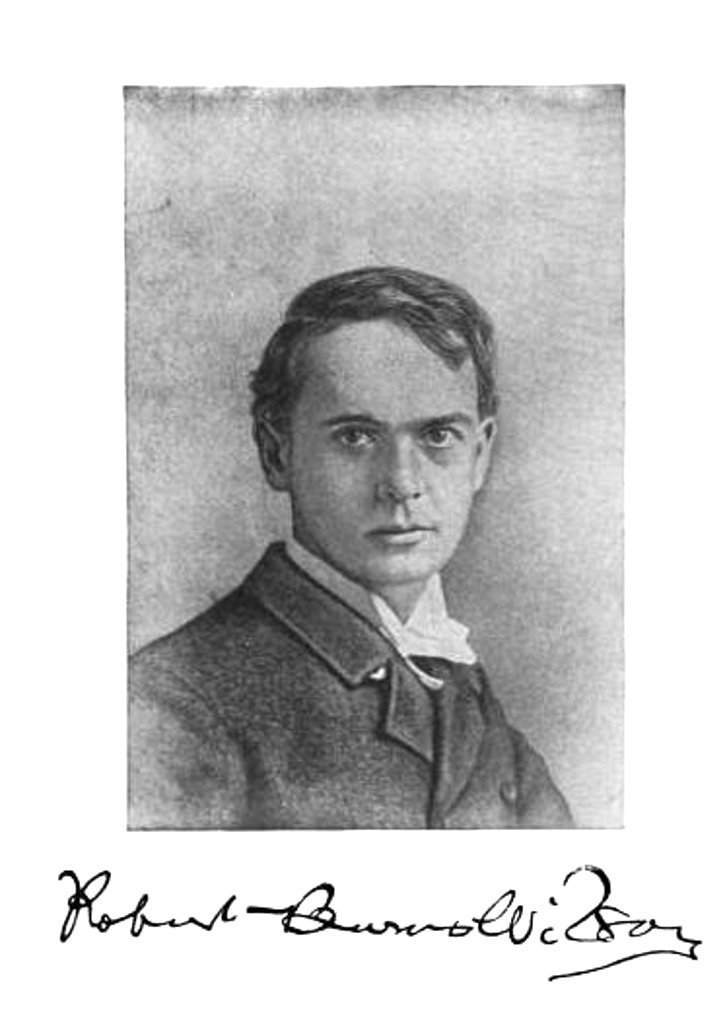
- Robert Burns Wilson
- Born: October 30, 1850; Parker, Pennsylvania
- Died: March 31, 1916 (aged 65); Brooklyn, New York
- Education: self-taught
- Known for: Painting
- Relatives: Anne Elizabeth Wilson (daughter)

Robert Burns Wilson (October 30, 1850 – March 31, 1916) was an American painter and poet.

== Biography ==
Wilson was born in Parker, Pennsylvania in 1850. In his teens, he moved to Pittsburgh and, with little formal training, he became a self-taught painter and poet. Wilson eventually traveled to and settled in Frankfort, Kentucky, where he achieved his greatest fame. In 1901, Wilson married Anne Hendrick, daughter of General William J. Hendrick, a former Attorney-General of Kentucky, during a visit to New York. Wilson moved from Kentucky to New York in 1904, and died there in 1916. His body was returned to Frankfort for interment, which he considered his home. He is buried in Frankfort Cemetery near the grave of Daniel Boone.

== Career ==
As a painter, Wilson is best known for his landscapes of the Kentucky countryside.

Wilson found success as a poet, publishing poems in the major monthly magazines of his day, including Harper's Magazine. Perhaps his most famous poem is "Remember the Maine", based on the battle cry that spurred the United States into the Spanish–American War. While his martial poetry met the spirit of the times, Wilson was best known during his day as a nature poet.

After achieving success as a poet, Wilson tried his hand at prose fiction, publishing Until the Day Break in 1900.

== Bibliography ==
In addition to his many poems that were published individually in various periodicals and anthologies around the country, Wilson published two anthologies of his own, as well as an epic poem, and the aforementioned novel.

- Wilson, Robert Burns (1897). Live and Love: Poems. Cassell & Company. (anthology)
- Wilson, Robert Burns (1894). Chant of a Woodland Spirit. G.P. Putnam's Sons. "Robert Burns WIlson." (single poem of 53 pages)
- Wilson, Robert Burns (1900). Until the Day Break: a novel. Charles Scribner's Sons. "Wilson Until the Day Break." (novel)
- Wilson, Robert Burns (1908). The Shadows of the Trees and other poems. R.H. Russel. (anthology)
