= The State Journal (Kentucky) =

- Type: Daily newspaper
- Owner(s): Frankfort Newsmedia (Boone Newspapers)
- Founder: John Meloan
- Editor: Chanda Veno
- Founded: January 7, 1900; 126 years ago
- Language: English
- City: Frankfort, Kentucky
- Country: United States
- Website: state-journal.com

The State Journal is a midsize daily broadsheet newspaper mainly serving Frankfort, the capital of Kentucky, and Franklin County. As of 2020 the paper prints Tuesday through Friday plus one weekend edition. and has a circulation of 6,100–7,300.

Due to financial stresses during the COVID-19 pandemic, the newspaper reduced their print schedule to twice a week and beefed up their online delivery and services.

The editor Chanda Veno, who has held the position since May 2021, is the first female editor in the paper's lengthy history (founded in 1900). Carl West, a graduate of University of Kentucky (1966) and member of the Kentucky Journalism Hall of Fame (2003), was the longtime editor of the newspaper, serving from 1979 to 2012.

== History ==
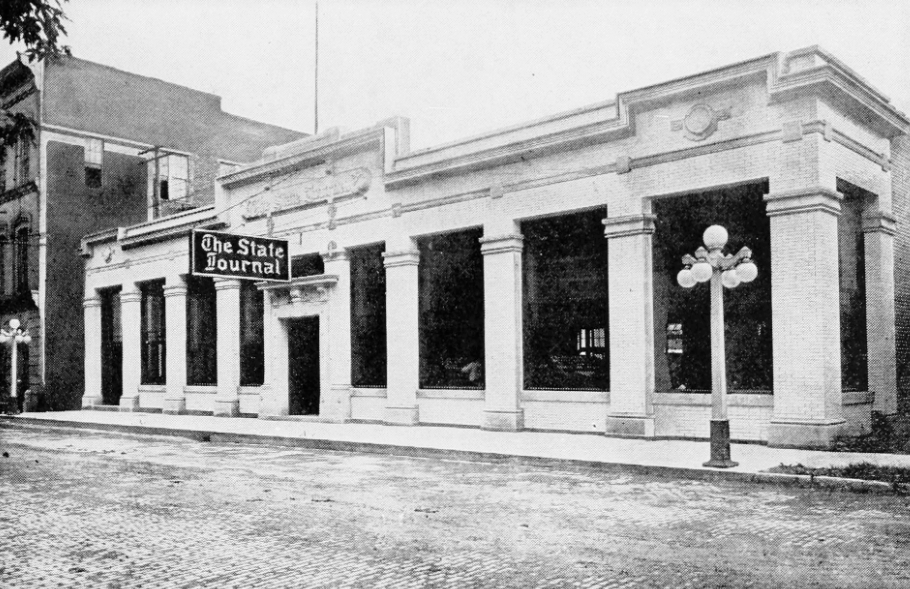
The State Journal offices, c. 1916

In 1900, John Meloan established The Kentucky State Journal, an eight-page, six-column Democratic morning daily. In 1908, Graham Vreeland established the Frankfort News. In 1911, both papers united to become The Frankfort News-Journal and was renamed The State Journal in 1912.

The Perry family ran the newspaper up until 1962, when it was bought by the Dix family of Wooster, Ohio. Operating as Frankfort Publishing Co., L.L.C., a subsidiary of Dix Communications, Albert E. Dix was publisher, followed by his children Troy Dix and Ann Dix Maenza through 2015. At that time, the paper was purchased by Frankfort Newsmedia LLC, an affiliate of Boone Newspapers Inc.

The newspaper was co-owned by Boone Newsmedia, former publisher Steve Stewart and Carpenter Media Group until Carpenter acquired full ownership in June 2024.
