= Gideon Shryock =

American architect (1802–1880)

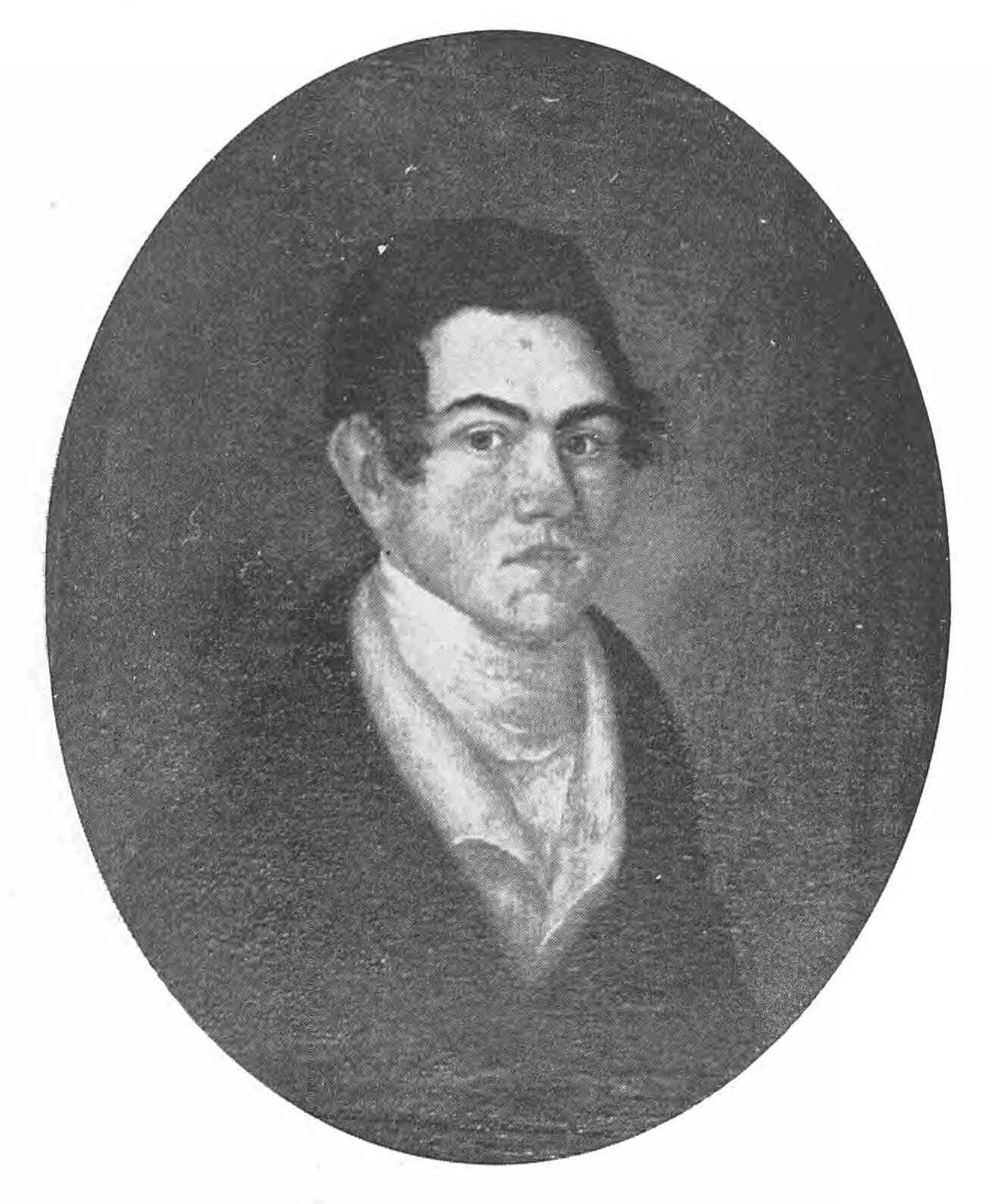
- portrait by Matthew Harris Jouett
- Born: 15 November 1802; Lexington
- Died: 19 June 1880 (aged 77); Louisville
- Resting place: Cave Hill Cemetery
- Occupation: Architect
- Parent(s): Mathias Shryock
- Relatives: Cincinnatus Shryock

Gideon Shryock (November 15, 1802 – June 19, 1880) was Kentucky's first professional architect in the Greek Revival Style. His name has frequently been misspelled as Gideon Shyrock.

== Early life ==
Shryock was born in Lexington, Kentucky on November 15, 1802. He was the son of Mathias and Mary Elizabeth Shryock. Gideon was one of eleven children. Their family home was located at 149 North Broadway in Lexington. One of Gideon's younger brothers, Cincinnatus Shryock, would also become an architect.

Shryock attended the famous Lancastrian school for boys directed by Mr. Aldridge. Gideon also apprenticed under his father as a young boy, mastering the principles of business by practice. When Gideon Shryock was 21 years old, he moved to Philadelphia for the opportunity to study under the famous architect William Strickland. While in Philadelphia, Shryock acquired a copy of the American edition of Abraham Swan's British Architect, which he brought back to Lexington when he moved back there after a year in Philadelphia.

== Career ==
Latrobe and Strickland were finishing the Bank of the United States project when in 1823, Gideon Shryock appeared at their office in Philadelphia, looking for an opportunity to apprentice with the master Strickland. Philadelphia was considered that nation's artistic and cultural capital at this time. Gideon's father was a builder allowing for Gideon to be equipped with practical knowledge of the field. Gideon shows a great enthusiasm and appreciation for architecture in the letters he writes to his parents. Following the year Gideon was in Philadelphia, he moved back to Lexington. At the age of 22, he opened his architecture office in Lexington.

In 1827, he received the commission for the Frankfort State Capitol and moved to Frankfort to be close to the project. In 1829, he married Elizabeth P. Bacon of Frankfort. Gideon and Elizabeth Shryock at 10 children. Shryock named his first son, the fourth child after his mentor William Strickland. However, his son William did not become an architect. Shryock's son Charles, was the only son that followed in his footsteps.

Following the completed construction of the Frankfort State Capitol, in 1831, Shryock moved his family back to Lexington. In 1833, the cholera pandemic took the life of Gideon's father, Mathias Shryock. His father died on June 14 and was among sixty deaths that day due to the pandemic. He was buried at the Episcopal graveyard in Lexington. Gideon and an old friend of his father, Nicholas Heddington made to make funeral arrangements, fabricate the coffin, and bury the body as no funerals were being held and the gravediggers were too frightened of the pandemic. Gideon erected a monumental gravestone for his father's burial place. The monument consisted of a stone base supporting Doric columns supporting a horizontal slab. Between the base and upper slab is the inscribed vertical stone.

In 1835, Shryock moved to Louisville. Gideon Shryock practiced his profession extensively in Louisville. He lived in three-story brick residences that he built at the corner of 8th street and Madison Street in Louisville. Shryock was a devout Baptist. He lived in Louisville for 45 years and died at that place on June 19, 1880. He was nearly 78 years old when he died. Shryock is buried in the Shryock family plot at Cave Hill Cemetery in Louisville, Kentucky.

In January 1827 a bill was approved for the rebuilding of the Kentucky State House in Frankfort that was destroyed by fire. Shryock was a practicing architect in Lexington for a little over two years. Shryock's friends convinced him to submit a proposal for the new State House. He submitted the drawings to the commission and to his own surprise was awarded first place. Receiving the building commission resulted in the move to Frankfort to be close to the building project. The project was completed in December 1829, nearly 3 years after the bill was approved to start construction. Gideon Shryock married Elizabeth in front of the State Capitol Building on June 30, 6 months before the project was completed. The State Capitol building in Frankfort is celebrated for the modern ingenuity of the architect. Ancient Greek elements were incorporated in a new and modern way, such as the rotunda, portico, and staircase. This project becomes the first Greek Revival Building in the west and in Kentucky. Shryock moved back to Lexington following the completion of the State Capitol.

This project gave him fame as the designer of noble architecture. Little Rock, Arkansas was calling for a proposal for their new State Capitol. In 1833, Gideon was asked to prepare plans for the building. However, Gideon dispatched George Wiegert to supervise the project. Gideon Shryock turned down the opportunity to supervise this project because back in Lexington, he was busy with the many commissions coming his way. One of those commissions was Morrison College at Transylvania University in Lexington. (6) Morrison college resembles the Parthenon on which the portico was modelled on. The patron of Morrison College was James Morrison who left a residuary legacy fund to erect a college to bear his name. It was Henry Clay that executor the fund and construction for Morrison College began in 1831 with Gideon Shryock as the architect and superintended. During this time, from 1831 to 1833, Shryock become an admirer of Henry Clay who was amid his presidential race against Jackson.

Following Morrison College, Shryock went back to Frankfort to build the Franklin County Court House and the Orlando Brown House in 1835. Later that year, he moved to Louisville after his plans were accepted for the new Court House in Louisville. Shryock was the architect for many buildings, the most notable being the Capitol building in Frankfort, Morrison College, and the Court House in Louisville. Other projects in Louisville include the Louisville University Medical College building, The Southern National Bank, and the original office of the Louisville Water Works Co. Shryock's buildings were dignified and restrained examples of architecture. The purity of line and Grecian manner made his buildings a classic beauty to be appreciated even today.

Shryock's immediate descendants are a daughter, two granddaughters, five great-grandchildren and several great-great-grandchildren. The notable projects of Gideon Shryock allowed him to enjoy a fame that extended beyond Kentucky.

== Legacy ==
Gideon Shryock was the first architect to build in the Greek Revival Style in Kentucky. He was introduced to this architectural style through his mentors. The famous architect, Latrobe built the first Greek Revival building in America. Benjamin Latrobe is credited as the father of the Greek Revival in the US. The Greek Revival style replaced the Palladian and Roman architecture which was considered the national style during the first half of the 19th century. Latrobe trained two pupils, one of which is William Strickland. Strickland entered the office and training under Latrobe at the age of 16.

Shryock is one of the namesakes of Greathouse/Shryock Traditional Elementary School in Louisville, Kentucky.

== Notable designs ==
- Old State House at Little Rock, Arkansas (begun 1833, completed in 1842) Hired by United States Senator John Pope.
- Old State Capitol in Frankfort, Kentucky (1829)
- Jefferson County Courthouse in Louisville, Kentucky begun circa 1837, completed 1860 (by Albert Fink).
- Old Morrison, Transylvania University, Lexington, Kentucky (completed 1834)
- Orlando Brown House, Frankfort, Kentucky
- Chestnut Street Methodist Church, now Brown Memorial CME Church, at 813 West Chestnut in Louisville (built 1864–1865)

== See also ==
- List of American architects
