= National Register of Historic Places listings in Woodford County, Kentucky =

Location of Woodford County in Kentucky

This is a list of the National Register of Historic Places listings in Woodford County, Kentucky.

This is intended to be a complete list of the properties and districts on the National Register of Historic Places in Woodford County, Kentucky, United States. The locations of National Register properties and districts for which the latitude and longitude coordinates are included below, may be seen in a map.

There are 86 properties and districts listed on the National Register in the county, of which 1 is a National Historic Landmark.

This National Park Service list is complete through NPS recent listings posted July 11, 2025.

== Current listings ==
| | Name on the Register | Image | Date listed | Location | City or town | Description |
|---|---|---|---|---|---|---|
| 1 | Airy Mount | | November 15, 1978 (#78001417) | Southwest of Versailles off U.S. Route 62; 38°01′38″N 84°46′28″W | Versailles | |
| 2 | Alexander Plantation House | Alexander Plantation House | June 23, 1983 (#83002891) | Off Old Frankfort Pike; 38°08′45″N 84°44′29″W | Midway | |
| 3 | John Allen House | | June 23, 1983 (#83002892) | Off Kentucky Route 169; 37°58′40″N 84°41′00″W | Keene | |
| 4 | Archeological Site 15Wd61 | | June 2, 1982 (#82004853) | Address Restricted | Nonesuch | |
| 5 | Arnold-Wooldridge House | | May 29, 1979 (#79001048) | South of Versailles; 38°00′21″N 84°45′52″W | Versailles | |
| 6 | Ayres House | | January 27, 1994 (#93001522) | Southern side of U.S. Route 421, less than 0.3 miles east of Drucker's Rd. 38°10′32″N 84°46′26″W | Midway | |
| 7 | Big Sink Rural Historic District | | January 27, 1994 (#93001523) | West of Midway off Interstate 64; 38°07′17″N 84°43′17″W | Versailles | |
| 8 | Big Spring Church | Big Spring Church | May 6, 1975 (#75000842) | 121 Rose Hill St. 38°03′07″N 84°43′54″W | Versailles | |
| 9 | Charles Black Farm | | February 10, 1989 (#88003347) | Faywood Rd. 38°06′18″N 84°38′34″W | Versailles | |
| 10 | Edward M. Blackburn House | | December 5, 1985 (#85003073) | Spring Station Rd. 38°09′30″N 84°44′02″W | Midway | |
| 11 | Lucas Broadhead House | | January 27, 1994 (#93001524) | Southwestern corner of the junction of Midway Pike and Aiken Rd. 38°05′41″N 84°43′20″W | Versailles | |
| 12 | Buck Pond | | February 10, 1989 (#88003344) | Paynes Mill Rd. 38°04′00″N 84°41′13″W | Versailles | |
| 13 | Bullock Site | | March 15, 2005 (#05000145) | Address Restricted | Versailles | |
| 14 | Marquis Calmes Tomb | | February 10, 1989 (#88003346) | Paynes Mill Rd. 38°03′32″N 84°40′28″W | Versailles | |
| 15 | Carter House | Carter House | May 2, 1975 (#75000843) | 110 Morgan St. 38°03′05″N 84°43′48″W | Versailles | |
| 16 | Cleveland House | Cleveland House | April 10, 2007 (#07000287) | 140 Park St. 38°03′16″N 84°43′56″W | Versailles | |
| 17 | Clifton Country Club | | November 7, 1995 (#95001271) | 1190 Buck Run Rd. 38°04′19″N 84°50′17″W | Versailles | |
| 18 | Clifton-McCraken Rural Historic District | | January 25, 1999 (#98000326) | Roughly along Clifton and McCraken Pikes, and Steele Rd. 38°04′26″N 84°47′54″W | Versailles | |
| 19 | Richard Cole Homestead | | January 27, 1994 (#93001525) | Southern side of Leestown Rd., northwest of Midway; 38°09′58″N 84°42′32″W | Midway | |
| 20 | Confederate Monument in Versailles | Confederate Monument in Versailles | July 17, 1997 (#97000662) | City Cemetery, southeast of the junction of Clifton Rd. and Kentucky Route 33; 38°02′57″N 84°43′44″W | Versailles | |
| 21 | Cooper House | | January 27, 1994 (#93001526) | Northern side of Leestown Rd., 0.9 miles east of the Midway exit from Interstate 64; 38°09′05″N 84°39′47″W | Midway | |
| 22 | Downtown Versailles Historic District | Downtown Versailles Historic District | September 2, 1975 (#75000844) | Both sides of Main St. between Rose Hill Ave. and Green St. 38°03′08″N 84°43′50″W | Versailles | |
| 23 | Joel DuPuy House | Joel DuPuy House | June 23, 1983 (#83002893) | Griers Creek Rd. 38°00′52″N 84°47′49″W | Tyrone | |
| 24 | Edgewood | | May 28, 1976 (#76000960) | 1 mile east of Versailles on U.S. Route 60; 38°03′11″N 84°42′15″W | Versailles | |
| 25 | Thomas Edwards House and Quarters | | June 23, 1983 (#83002894) | Kentucky Route 1659; 38°05′02″N 84°46′44″W | Tyrone | |
| 26 | Elkwood | | January 27, 1994 (#93001527) | 158 Leestown Pike, W. 38°09′44″N 84°40′56″W | Midway | |
| 27 | William Garrett House | William Garrett House | June 23, 1983 (#83002895) | Off Kentucky Route 169; 37°59′37″N 84°40′51″W | Keene | |
| 28 | John Graham House | | November 14, 1978 (#78001416) | Southeast of Midway on Weisenberger Mill Rd. 38°08′20″N 84°40′26″W | Midway | |
| 29 | Guyn's Mill Historic District | Guyn's Mill Historic District | August 29, 1983 (#83002897) | Mundy's Landing and Pauls Mill Rds. 37°54′02″N 84°42′29″W | Troy | |
| 30 | Robert Guyn, Jr. House | | August 25, 1983 (#83002896) | South of Troy on Kentucky Route 33; 37°53′51″N 84°42′20″W | Troy | |
| 31 | Ezra Hammon House | | August 22, 1983 (#83002898) | Off Kentucky Route 33; 37°56′18″N 84°42′02″W | Keene | |
| 32 | A.T. Harris House | | February 10, 1989 (#88003345) | Big Sink Pike; 38°06′22″N 84°40′19″W | Versailles | |
| 33 | Heartland | | May 30, 2019 (#100004004) | 1470 Clifton Rd. 38°03′24″N 84°45′36″W | Versailles vicinity | |
| 34 | Hogan Quarters | | August 22, 1983 (#83002899) | Off Kentucky Route 33; 38°01′18″N 84°43′18″W | Versailles | |
| 35 | Humphries Estate Quarters | | June 23, 1983 (#83002900) | Kentucky Route 1967; 38°00′07″N 84°40′06″W | Versailles | |
| 36 | Dr. William Jennings House | | January 12, 1983 (#83002901) | South of Pinckard on Kentucky Route 169; 37°58′24″N 84°40′49″W | Pinckard | |
| 37 | Capt. Jack Jouett House | | June 13, 1972 (#72000548) | 5 miles southwest of Versailles off Kentucky Route 1964; 37°58′59″N 84°46′31″W | Versailles | |
| 38 | Labrot & Graham Distillery | Labrot & Graham Distillery | November 7, 1995 (#95001272) | 7855 McCracken Pike; 38°06′46″N 84°48′43″W | Frankfort | |
| 39 | Leavy Tobacco Barn | | January 27, 1994 (#93001528) | Eastern side of Georgetown Rd., 0.8 miles north of the Midway exit from Interstate 64; 38°10′04″N 84°39′29″W | Midway | |
| 40 | Lexington Extension of the Louisville Southern Railroad | Lexington Extension of the Louisville Southern Railroad | August 4, 2004 (#04000789) | Eastern Lawrenceburg to Milner; 38°01′56″N 84°49′09″W | Lawrenceburg | Extends into Anderson County |
| 41 | Thomas Lyne House | | November 28, 1980 (#80001691) | South of Versailles on Smith Lane; 37°57′28″N 84°41′06″W | Versailles | |
| 42 | Margaret Hall | Margaret Hall | August 3, 1987 (#87001304) | 117 Elm St. 38°03′26″N 84°43′54″W | Versailles | |
| 43 | Martyrs Monument in Midway | Martyrs Monument in Midway | July 17, 1997 (#97000663) | City Cemetery, southwest of the junction of the L&N railroad tracks and U.S. Route 62; 38°08′53″N 84°41′40″W | Midway | |
| 44 | McCrackin Distillery and Mill | | June 23, 1983 (#83002903) | Kentucky Route 1659; 38°05′31″N 84°47′17″W | Tyrone | |
| 45 | Cyrus McCrackin House and Quarters | | August 22, 1983 (#83002902) | Off Steele Rd. 38°06′22″N 84°46′52″W | Tyrone | |
| 46 | Midway Historic District | Midway Historic District | November 17, 1978 (#78001415) | U.S. Route 62; 38°08′48″N 84°41′14″W | Midway | |
| 47 | Miller's House at Mortonsville Mill | | June 23, 1983 (#83002904) | Kentucky Route 1965; 37°58′19″N 84°45′25″W | Salvisa | |
| 48 | Millville General Store | | November 1, 2023 (#100009537) | 5660 McCracken Pike; 38°07′59″N 84°49′24″W | Frankfort | |
| 49 | George F. Moore Place | | June 23, 1983 (#83002905) | Off U.S. Route 62; 38°06′04″N 84°41′34″W | Versailles | |
| 50 | Morgan Street Historic District | Morgan Street Historic District | May 8, 1980 (#80001692) | Morgan St. 38°03′06″N 84°43′37″W | Versailles | |
| 51 | Moss Side | | January 8, 1979 (#79001049) | Southwest of Versailles on McCowans Ferry Pike; 38°01′10″N 84°46′14″W | Versailles | |
| 52 | Andrew Muldrow Quarters | | June 23, 1983 (#83002907) | Griers Creek Rd. 38°01′06″N 84°49′11″W | Tyrone | |
| 53 | Munday's Landing | | September 5, 1975 (#75000845) | Munday's Landing Rd., south of Versailles on the Kentucky River; 37°51′13″N 84°46′16″W | Versailles | |
| 54 | Claiborne W. Nuckols Farmstead | | January 27, 1994 (#93001529) | Northern side of U.S. Route 60, 1½ miles north of its junction with Midway Pike; 38°05′59″N 84°44′45″W | Versailles | |
| 55 | Nugent's Crossroad Historic District | | January 27, 1994 (#93001530) | Junction of Midway and Old Frankfort Pikes; 38°07′25″N 84°41′57″W | Midway | |
| 56 | Offutt-Cole Tavern | Offutt-Cole Tavern | November 23, 1977 (#77000664) | North of Versailles on U.S. Route 62; 38°07′24″N 84°42′00″W | Versailles | |
| 57 | Old Taylor Distillery | Old Taylor Distillery | March 13, 2017 (#100000747) | 4445 McCracken Pike; 38°08′46″N 84°49′56″W | Frankfort | |
| 58 | Paul Family Complex | | September 23, 1980 (#80001690) | West of Troy on Paul's Mill Rd. 37°54′18″N 84°42′42″W | Troy | |
| 59 | Lewis Payne House | | April 29, 1982 (#82002750) | Lansing Lane; 38°07′29″N 84°39′56″W | Midway | |
| 60 | Pinkerton Hall | | November 20, 1974 (#74000919) | 650 East St. 38°08′46″N 84°40′44″W | Midway | |
| 61 | Pisgah Presbyterian Church | Pisgah Presbyterian Church | August 22, 1983 (#83002906) | Off U.S. Route 60; 38°03′14″N 84°39′17″W | Versailles | |
| 62 | Pisgah Rural Historic District | | February 10, 1989 (#88003348) | Area northeast of Versailles roughly bounded by S. Elkhorn Creek, U.S. Route 60, and Big Sink Rd. 38°05′08″N 84°39′40″W | Versailles | |
| 63 | Pleasant Lawn | | November 15, 1978 (#78001418) | North of Versailles off U.S. Route 62 at Bonita; 38°05′10″N 84°42′29″W | Versailles | |
| 64 | Ready-Twyman House | | March 7, 2019 (#100003477) | 220 N. Main St. 38°03′19″N 84°43′48″W | Versailles | |
| 65 | Redd Road Rural Historic District | | February 28, 1991 (#91000153) | Area largely south and east of the junction of Redd and Frankfort Roads; 38°05′30″N 84°37′34″W | Lexington | Extends into Fayette County |
| 66 | Robertson Place | | June 23, 1983 (#83002908) | Clifton and Steele Rds. 38°04′38″N 84°48′30″W | Tyrone | |
| 67 | Rose Hill Historic District | Rose Hill Historic District | December 17, 1982 (#82001578) | Rose Hill Ave. 38°03′06″N 84°44′06″W | Versailles | |
| 68 | Scearce House | | April 9, 1987 (#87000602) | McCracken Pike; 38°05′35″N 84°46′30″W | Versailles | |
| 69 | Shipp House | | June 30, 1983 (#83002909) | Address Restricted | Midway | |
| 70 | South Main Street Historic District | South Main Street Historic District | July 2, 1987 (#87001106) | 298-321 S. Main St. 38°02′50″N 84°43′47″W | Versailles | |
| 71 | Stone House at Fisher's Mill | | June 23, 1983 (#83002912) | Off U.S. Route 421; 38°10′21″N 84°42′16″W | Midway | |
| 72 | Stone House on Beale's Run | | June 23, 1983 (#83002910) | Off Kentucky Route 1685; 38°11′02″N 84°44′32″W | Midway | |
| 73 | Stone House on Clifton Pike | | June 23, 1983 (#83002911) | Kentucky Route 1964; 38°04′11″N 84°47′09″W | Tyrone | |
| 74 | Stone House on Steele's Grant | | June 23, 1983 (#83002575) | Off Kentucky Route 1964; 38°04′18″N 84°48′58″W | Tyrone | |
| 75 | Stone House on Tanner's Creek | | June 23, 1983 (#83002913) | Carpenter Pike; 37°58′49″N 84°45′29″W | Salvisa | |
| 76 | E.W. Taylor House | | January 27, 1994 (#93001531) | Eastern side of Midway Pike, about ½ mile north of its junction with Old Frankfort Pike; 38°07′37″N 84°41′03″W | Midway | |
| 77 | Solomon Thomas House | | June 23, 1983 (#83002914) | Craigs Creek Rd. 37°59′21″N 84°48′06″W | Salvisa | |
| 78 | W.B. Spring House | | June 23, 1983 (#83002915) | Off U.S. Route 62; 38°06′43″N 84°41′40″W | Versailles | |
| 79 | Versailles Elementary School | | July 10, 2015 (#15000459) | 299 S. Main St. 38°02′51″N 84°43′48″W | Versailles | Now the Safe Harbor Academy |
| 80 | Wallace Station Historic District | | January 27, 1994 (#93001534) | Wallace Station, Old Frankfort Pike; 38°07′16″N 84°41′39″W | Midway | |
| 81 | Samuel Wallace House | | January 27, 1994 (#93001532) | Northern side of Old Frankfort Pike, east of Wallace; 38°07′10″N 84°41′16″W | Midway | |
| 82 | Wallace-Alford Farmstead | | January 27, 1994 (#93001533) | S.S. Weisenberger (Craig's) Mill Rd. east of Lansing Ln. 38°07′42″N 84°39′21″W | Midway | |
| 83 | Weisenberger Mills and Related Buildings | Weisenberger Mills and Related Buildings | August 16, 1984 (#84001987) | Off U.S. Route 421; 38°07′34″N 84°38′13″W | Midway | Extends into Scott County |
| 84 | Welcome Hall | | October 10, 1975 (#75000846) | 4 miles west of Versailles off Clifton Rd. 38°04′26″N 84°47′47″W | Versailles | |
| 85 | Benjamin Wilson House | | June 23, 1983 (#83002916) | Off U.S. Route 62; 38°06′43″N 84°41′41″W | Versailles | |
| 86 | Wyndehurst | | November 15, 1978 (#78001419) | 5 miles (8 km) southwest of Versailles off Kentucky Route 1964; 37°59′39″N 84°46′39″W | Versailles | |

== Former listing ==
| | Name on the Register | Image | Date listed | Date removed | Location | City or town | Description |
|---|---|---|---|---|---|---|---|
| 1 | John Jordan Crittenden Birthplace Cabin | | October 18, 1972 (#72001554) | October 19, 1978 | US 60 | Versailles | Birthplace of John J. Crittenden. Relocated and restored in 1978. |

== See also ==
- List of National Historic Landmarks in Kentucky
- National Register of Historic Places listings in Kentucky
