= National Register of Historic Places listings in Anderson County, Kentucky =

Location of Anderson County in Kentucky

This is a list of the National Register of Historic Places listings in Anderson County, Kentucky.

This is intended to be a complete list of the properties and districts on the National Register of Historic Places in Anderson County, Kentucky, United States. The locations of National Register properties and districts for which the latitude and longitude coordinates are included below, may be seen in a map.

There are 12 properties and districts listed on the National Register in the county.

This National Park Service list is complete through NPS recent listings posted December 12, 2025.

== Current listings ==
	Name on the Register	Image	Date listed	Location	City or town	Description
1	Confederate Monument in Lawrenceburg	Confederate Monument in Lawrenceburg	July 17, 1997 (#97000716)	Courthouse Lawn, 0.5 miles south of U.S. Route 127 and Kentucky Route 44; 38°02′06″N 84°53′44″W	Lawrenceburg	
2	R.H. Crossfield House	R.H. Crossfield House	June 11, 1975 (#75000730)	Southwest of Lawrenceburg off Anderson City Rd. 37°59′06″N 84°58′57″W	Lawrenceburg	
3	Dowling House	Dowling House	July 10, 1979 (#79000957)	321 S. Main St. 38°01′59″N 84°53′40″W	Lawrenceburg	
4	Thomas H. Hanks House	Thomas H. Hanks House	May 14, 1980 (#80001478)	516 E. Woodford St. 38°02′21″N 84°53′11″W	Lawrenceburg	
5	Kavanaugh Academy	Kavanaugh Academy	September 19, 1973 (#73000781)	241 E. Woodford St. 38°02′19″N 84°53′32″W	Lawrenceburg	
6	Lawrenceburg Commercial Historic District	Lawrenceburg Commercial Historic District	August 5, 1994 (#94000837)	Roughly Main St. from North Alley to Court St. and Court from Main to the Southern Railway tracks 38°02′11″N 84°53′44″W	Lawrenceburg	
7	Lexington Extension of the Louisville Southern Railroad	Lexington Extension of the Louisville Southern Railroad	August 4, 2004 (#04000789)	Eastern Lawrenceburg to Milner; 38°02′08″N 84°50′00″W	Lawrenceburg	Extends into Woodford County
8	McBrayer-Clark House	McBrayer-Clark House	September 19, 1973 (#73000782)	North of Lawrenceburg on Kentucky Route 326; 38°04′06″N 84°54′19″W	Lawrenceburg	
9	Rev. William Dudley Moore House	Rev. William Dudley Moore House	February 21, 1979 (#79000958)	4 miles (6.4 km) south of Lawrenceburg; 37°59′00″N 84°52′31″W	Lawrenceburg	
10	Old Prentice Distillery	Old Prentice Distillery	March 19, 1987 (#87000478)	Kentucky Route 513; 37°58′23″N 84°53′54″W	Lawrenceburg	
11	Old Wash Place	Old Wash Place	June 11, 1975 (#75000731)	9 miles west of Lawrenceburg at the junction of U.S. Route 62 and Kentucky Route 53; 37°57′36″N 85°01′28″W	Lawrenceburg	
12	T.B. Ripy House	T.B. Ripy House	February 20, 1980 (#80001479)	320 S. Main St. 38°01′58″N 84°53′44″W	Lawrenceburg	

== See also ==
- List of National Historic Landmarks in Kentucky
- National Register of Historic Places listings in Kentucky
