= Blackburn House =

Blackburn House may refer to:

in Scotland

- Blackburn House, West Lothian

in the United States

- Blackburn House (Athens, Alabama), listed on the NRHP in Alabama
- Blackburn House (Canehill, Arkansas), listed on the NRHP in Arkansas
- Blackburn House (Rogers, Arkansas), listed on the NRHP in Arkansas
- Edward M. Blackburn House, Midway, Kentucky, listed on the NRHP in Kentucky
- Julius Blackburn House, Georgetown, Kentucky, listed on the NRHP in Kentucky
- Dr. William and Elizabeth Blackburn House, Pierre, South Dakota, listed on the NRHP in South Dakota
- Ambrose Blackburn Farmstead, Gordonsburg, Tennessee, listed on the NRHP in Tennessee
- Batte-Brown-Blackburn House, Pulaski, Tennessee, listed on the NRHP in Tennessee
