= Young's High Bridge =

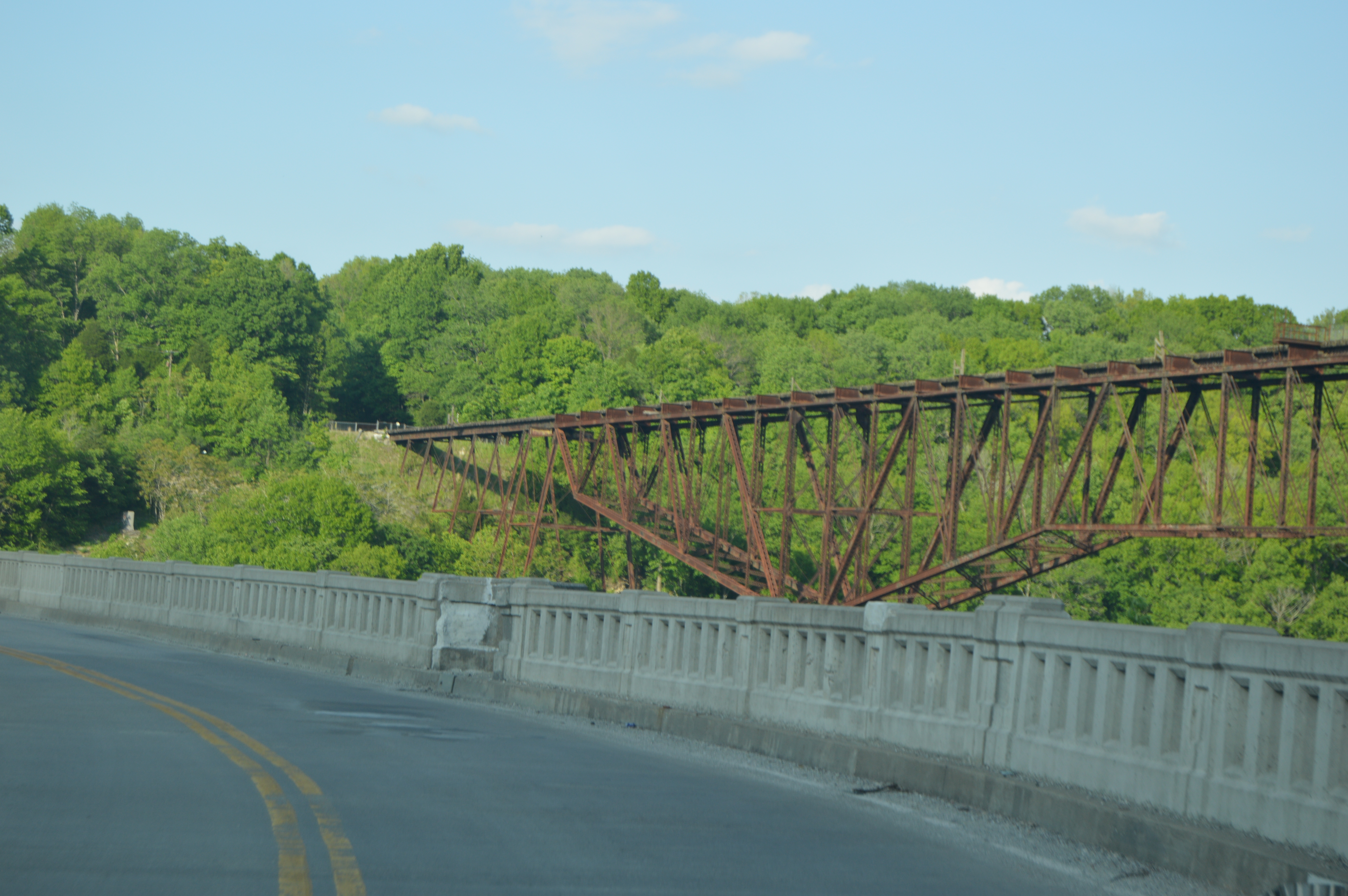
- Eastern section, seen from U.S. Route 62
- Coordinates: 38.0404°N 84.8457°W
- Crosses: Kentucky River
- Locale: Anderson and Woodford Counties, Kentucky, United States

Characteristics
- Design: Cantilever
- Total length: 1,659 ft (506 m)
- Height: 283 ft (86 m)

History
- Opened: 1889
- Closed: End of railroad use 1985

Location
- Interactive map of Young's High Bridge

Young's High Bridge is a former railroad bridge near Tyrone, Kentucky, USA, that spans the Kentucky River between Anderson County, Kentucky and Woodford County, Kentucky for the Louisville Southern Railroad. The cantilever bridge, named in honor of William Bennett Henderson Young, was constructed in 1889, and the first train crossed over on August 24, 1889. The bridge is 1,659 feet in length, is 283 feet above the river, and includes a 551 foot long cantilever span.

The bridge formerly carried traffic on the Lexington to Lawrenceburg Division of the Southern Railway. The last passenger train crossed the bridge on December 27, 1937. It remained in use for freight traffic, which had dwindled by the late 1970s, and the last train to cross the bridge was in November 1985, after which the line was abandoned by the Norfolk Southern Railway.

It is a contributing structure in the Lexington Extension of the Louisville Southern Railroad, which is listed on the National Register of Historic Places.

In February 2013, the bridge was sold to Young's Bridge Partners LLC, who operates a bungee jumping platform on the bridge on behalf of Vertigo Bungee. An adjacent section of the railway line is owned by Bluegrass Railroad and Museum, which runs excursion trains to the eastern end of the bridge.

== See also ==
- List of bridges in the United States by height
