= Lawrenceburg Commercial Historic District =

Lawrenceburg Commercial Historic District may refer to:

- Lawrenceburg Commercial Historic District (Lawrenceburg, Kentucky), listed on the National Register of Historic Places in Anderson County, Kentucky
- Lawrenceburg Commercial Historic District (Lawrenceburg, Tennessee), listed on the National Register of Historic Places in Lawrence County, Tennessee
