= Nugent Crossroads, Kentucky =

Unincorporated community in Kentucky, United States

Coordinates: 38°07′24″N 84°41′55″W

Nugent Crossroads is an unincorporated community in Woodford County, in the U.S. state of Kentucky.

== History ==
Variant names were "Wallace" and "Wallace Station". A post office called Wallace Station was in operation from 1886 until 1903; the post office was renamed Wallace in 1903, and closed in 1913. The present name honors James Nugent, a local merchant.
