= Lexington Extension of the Louisville Southern Railroad =

- U.S. National Register of Historic Places
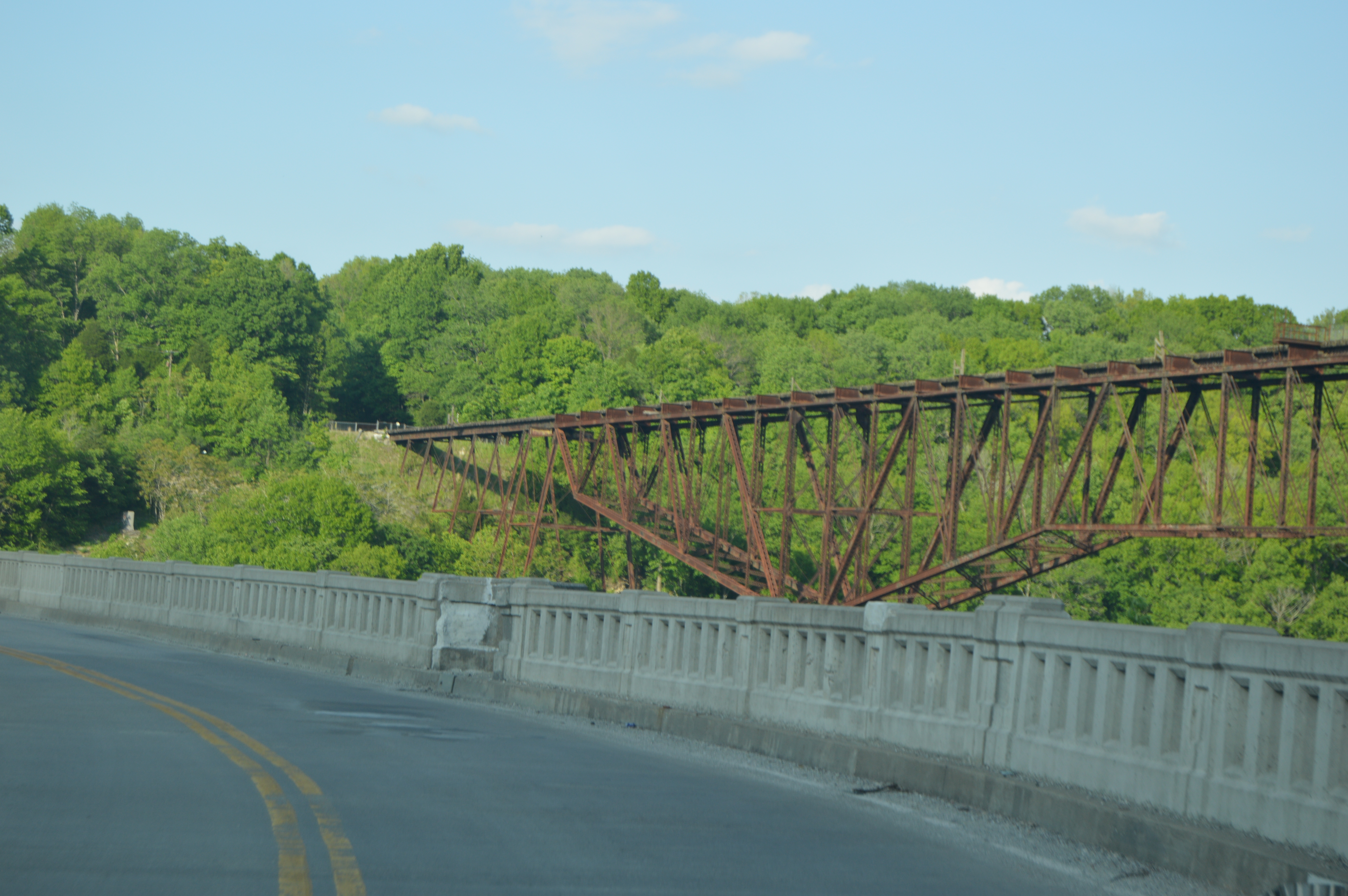

- Location within Kentucky
- Nearest city: Lawrenceburg, Kentucky
- Coordinates: 38.032222°N 84.819167°W
- Area: 123 acres (50 ha)
- Built: 1889
- Built by: Smith, Charles Shaler; McLeod, John
- NRHP reference No.: 04000789
- Added to NRHP: August 4, 2004

The Lexington Extension of the Louisville Southern Railroad, in Anderson and Woodford counties near Lawrenceburg, Kentucky, was listed on the National Register of Historic Places in 2004.

The listing included the no-longer-actively-used portion, about 8.25 miles (13.28 km), of the 22 miles (35 km) Lexington Extension, which was built in 1889 by the Louisville Southern Railroad. The listing included seven contributing structures. This portion is between Lawrenceburg and Versailles and includes the Young's High Bridge and the Cedar Brook Viaduct, as well as three wooden trestle bridges.
