= Bluegrass Railroad and Museum =

Coordinates: 38°2′49.54″N 84°45′29.07″W

The Bluegrass Railroad and Museum is a railroad museum and heritage railroad in Versailles, Kentucky, United States.

Operating out of the Woodford County Park, the Railroad offers 11-mile round trip excursions through the horse farms of Kentucky to Tyrone, Kentucky where the train stops at Young's High Bridge and allows passengers to disembark and view Young's High Bridge and the Kentucky River valley area.

The railroad uses diesel locomotives, of which it has four operational and two for static display. It also has about 40 pieces of rolling stock. Equipment is stored in three separate locations along the museum's 5.5 miles of track, all of which can be seen while riding the excursions from the Woodford County Park to Young's High Bridge.

== Museum ==
The museum was founded in 1976 by some members of the Bluegrass Railroad Club, a model railroad group. It began to acquire equipment from local railroads, initially storing the equipment in the old Louisville and Nashville Railroad's Lexington yard which is now part of the parking lot for Rupp Arena. The equipment was moved to a siding at Eastern State Hospital in Lexington, Kentucky, then to the Bluegrass Army Depot grounds in Avon, Kentucky. In 1988 the museum moved to its present location on Hwy 62 outside Versailles, Kentucky. After a fire in 2006, a partially burned house was remodeled into a Station and Museum.

== Rail line ==
In 1987–1988 five and a half miles of railroad line from Versailles, Kentucky to the Kentucky River and nine and a half acres of land in Woodford County Park just outside Versailles were acquired to begin the process of creating a museum site and train ride.

The rail line was originally built by the Louisville Southern Railroad in the 1880s. For a brief time it was leased by the Monon Railroad. Later, it became part of the Southern Railway. While operated by the Southern, a switching accident at the Tyrone Generating Station caused coal shipments to be received by truck, and hastened the end of the usefulness of this portion of the line. Later, the Norfolk Southern Railway operated the line. A few years into NS ownership, the portion of the line between the Kentucky River and Versailles was slated for abandonment, and subsequently sold to the museum. The line from the Kentucky River to Lawrenceburg, Kentucky was abandoned and sold to a scrapper in 2009. The rails on Young's High Bridge and into Lawrenceburg were then quickly removed and sold for scrap. Young's High Bridge itself has been bought by a private party who have formed a LLC to develop the area into a tourist attraction. Vertigo Bungee, a loose band of thrill-seeking adrenaline junkies known for appearances on MTV sports since the 1990s, has since developed Young's High Bridge into a permanent bungee jumping platform. Young's High Bridge is now considered to be the highest permanent platform bridge jump in North America. Meanwhile, the railroad line from Versailles to Lexington has been sold first to the Lexington and Ohio Railroad and now to the R.J. Corman Railroad/Central Kentucky Lines.

== See also ==
- List of heritage railroads in the United States
