= T. B. Ripy House =

Historic house in Kentucky, United States

- T.B. Ripy House
- U.S. National Register of Historic Places
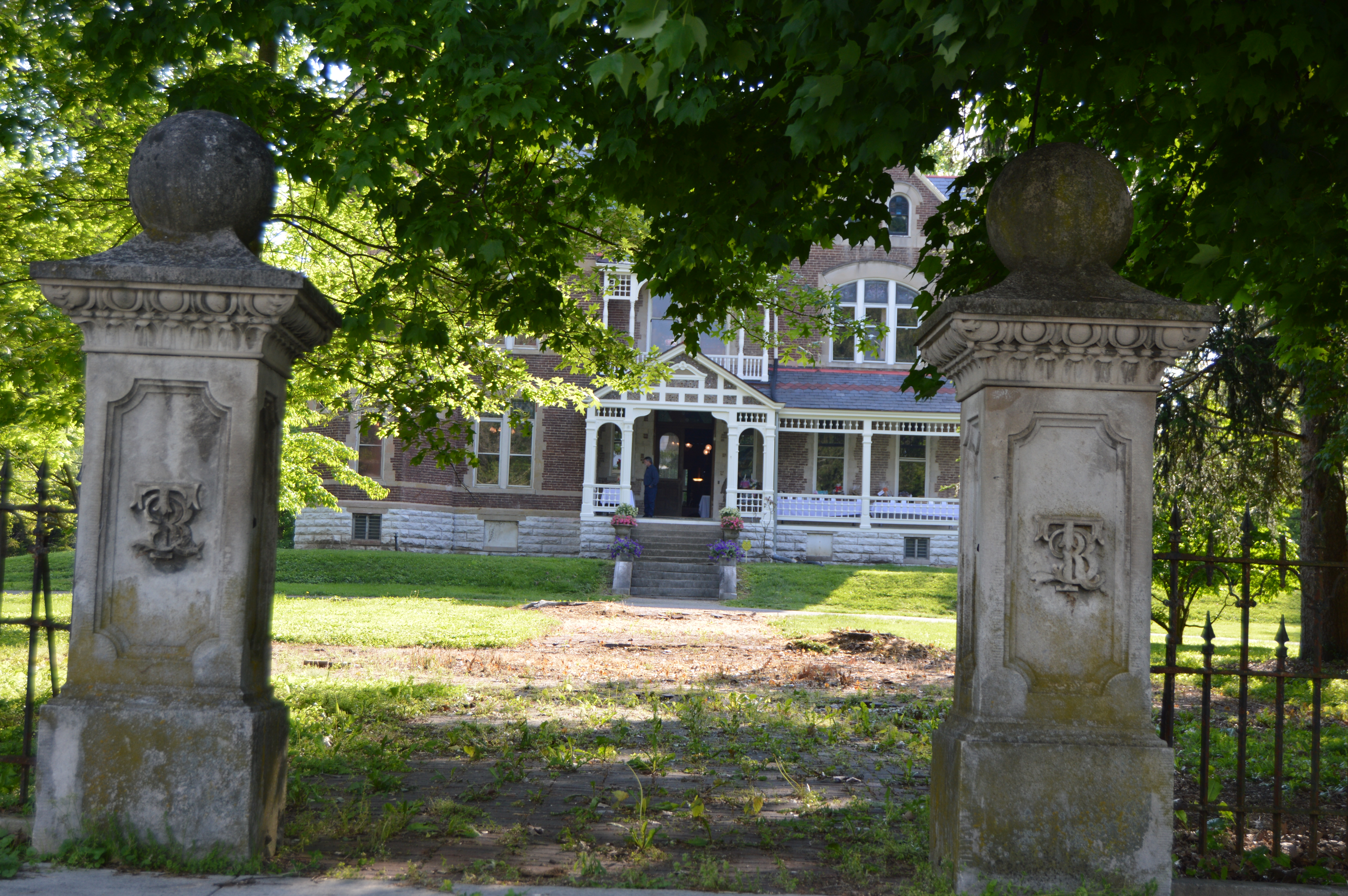
- Front of the house

- Location within Kentucky Location within the United States
- Location: Lawrenceburg, Kentucky
- Coordinates: 38°01′57″N 84°53′44″W
- Built: 1888
- NRHP reference No.: 80001479
- Added to NRHP: February 20, 1980

The T.B. Ripy House is a house on the National Register of Historic Places listings in Anderson County, Kentucky, located in Lawrenceburg, Kentucky. It was completed in 1888.

Thomas Beebe Ripy (1847–1902) operated a distillery in nearby Tyrone, Kentucky that later spawned the Wild Turkey brand. The family sold the house in 1965, and it was placed on National Register of Historic Places in 1980. Descendants of Ripy repurchased the house in 2010 with the intent of repairing it.

Currently, the house is a local community resource within Lawrenceburg, KY, which is available for rent for small intimate social events including bourbon and whiskey tasting events, weddings, showers, reunions, and small music events.
