= Mortonsville =

Mortonsville may refer to the following places in the United States:

- Mortonsville, Kentucky
- Mortonsville, Indiana
