= Old Wash Place =

Historic house

Coordinates: 37.96002°N 85.024263°W

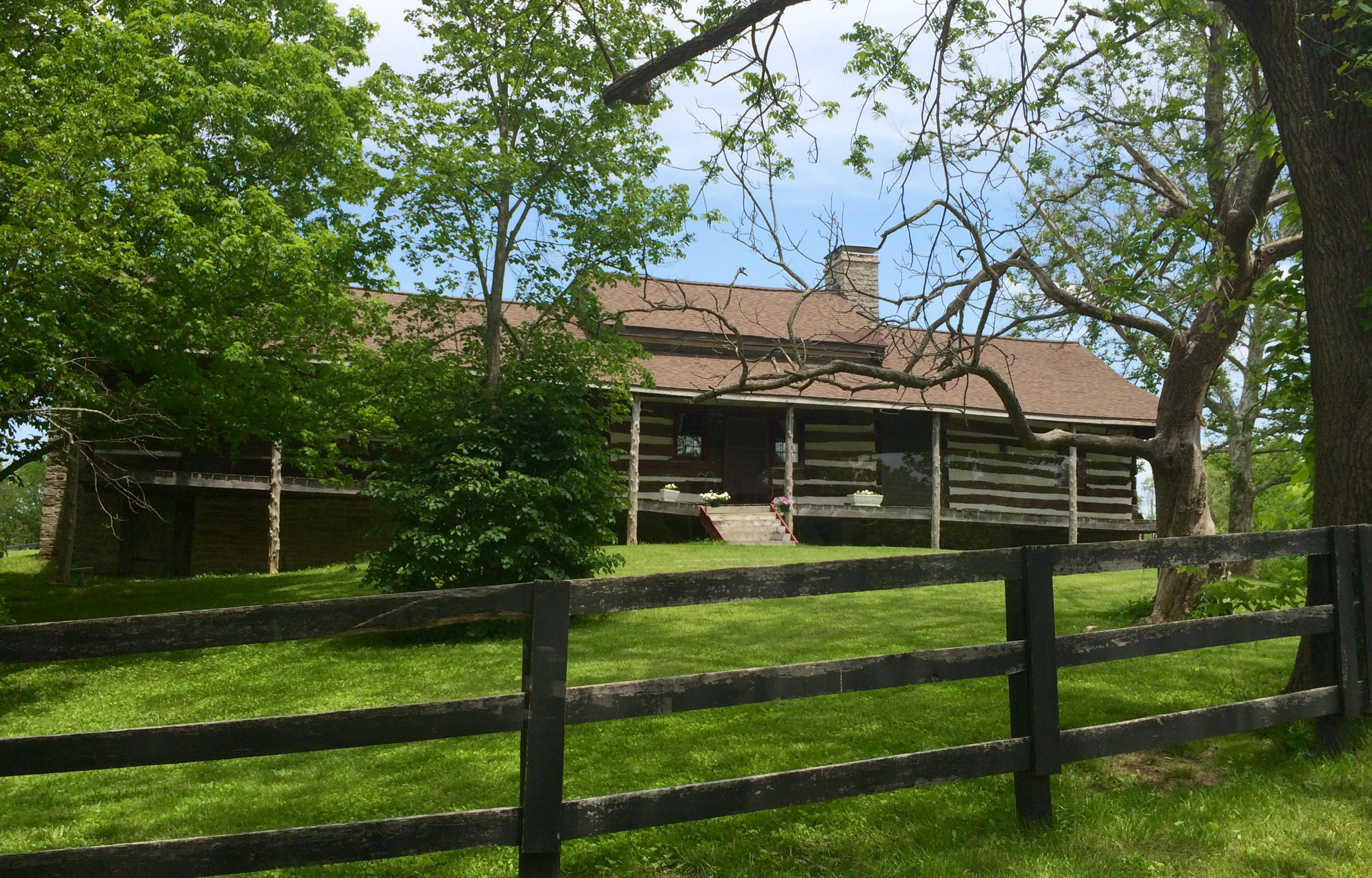
The Old Wash Place, a log cabin in Anderson County, Kentucky.

The Old Wash Place, in Anderson County, Kentucky near Lawrenceburg, was built c. 1791. It was listed on the National Register of Historic Places in 1975. It is a double-pen log cabin with a central section and two additions connected by dogtrots. The central portion of the house was constructed by Benjamin Wash, Revolutionary War veteran and early Anderson County settler. The cabin is located at the intersection of KY 53 and US 62.

Benjamin Wash and his wife Jemima came with their five children to present-day Anderson County from Virginia around 1791. After the death of Benjamin Wash around 1819, his son John Wash moved into the house, where he resided until his death in 1871. John was one of the original Justices of the Peace of Anderson County when the county was formed in 1827. An ardent opponent of slavery, John sat on the platform with Cassius M. Clay when the famed abolitionist gave a speech at the Anderson County Courthouse in April 1849.
