= Julius Blackburn House =

Historic house in Kentucky, United States

- U.S. National Register of Historic Places
- Location within Kentucky Location within the United States
- Nearest city: Georgetown, Kentucky
- Coordinates: 38°13′49″N 84°43′27″W
- Built: 1799
- Architect: Thomas Metcalfe
- NRHP reference No.: 77000641
- Added to NRHP: April 14, 1977

Julius Blackburn House, also known as Warwick, is an historic estate located in the western area of Scott County, Kentucky. The oldest section of the structure is a log cabin dating prior to 1799, with a newer stone section built by Thomas Metcalfe for Julius Blackburn in 1799. The property was added to the U.S. National Register of Historic Places on April 14, 1977.

== History ==
American Revolutionary War veteran Sergeant Julius Blackburn originally settled in Woodford County, Kentucky at Blackburn's Fort in 1790 after serving with Gist's Virginia Brigade. In 1799, Blackburn relocated to Scott County, Kentucky with his wife Elizabeth (Betsy) Scruggs. The Blackburn's moved into a log cabin and engaged stonemason Thomas Metcalfe to construct their house with stone from Chinn River Kentucky marble quarry in Woodford, County. The older log cabin joins the newer stone section to become a structure known as the Warwick House.

D.L. Nunnelly resided at the estate from 1912 until 1951, followed by John White.
