= Airy Mount =

- U.S. National Register of Historic Places
- Location within Kentucky Location within the United States
- Location: Off U.S. Route 62 southwest of Versailles, Kentucky
- Coordinates: 38°01′37″N 84°46′31″W
- Area: 3 acres (1.2 ha)
- Built: c. 1796
- Architectural style: Georgian
- MPS: Cohen Mural Houses TR
- NRHP reference No.: 78001417
- Added to NRHP: November 15, 1978

Airy Mount, near Versailles, Kentucky, is a historic Georgian house dating from c. 1796. It was listed on the National Register of Historic Places in 1978.

It is notable for its mural painted by French immigrant "Alfred Cohen, who left Marseille, France, with two brothers in the 1820s and settled in Midway, in the northeast corner of Woodford County. The three houses concerned are the only ones known anywhere to have been painted with murals by Cohen, a primitive artist who had little, if any, formal training. Although these landscape scenes show disregard for correct scale and perspective, they possess charm through the artist's lack of inhibitions."

It is a "substantial residence, built in several stages, .. located one mile north of McCowan's Ferry Road in rural Woodford County. Appropriately named, the house is situated on the summit of a low, wide rise, and has a commanding view of the gently rolling landscape in all directions. The earliest portion, constructed c. 1796, includes the western three bays of the central two-story block."

The other two houses with Cohen murals are Wyndehurst and Pleasant Lawn, both also NRHP-listed.
