= Anna Mac Clarke =

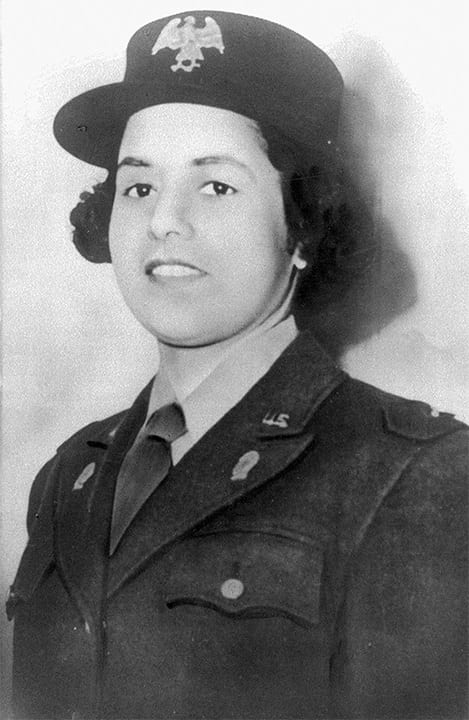
Anna Mac Clarke in 1943-44

Anna Mac Clarke (born Anna Mack Mitchel; June 20, 1919 – April 19, 1944) was a Women's Army Corps officer during World War II. She became the first African American woman to be a commanding officer of an otherwise all-white regiment. She became a first lieutenant.

== Early years ==
Anna Mac Clarke was born Anna Mack Mitchel in Lawrenceburg, Kentucky. Anna Mac Clarke's mother, Nora Mitchel, was a cook in Lawrenceburg, and her father Tom Clark, was a laborer from Harrodsburg, Kentucky. Since her parents never married, Anna Mack Mitchel would come be known as Anna Mac Clarke after dropping the "k" from Mack, and adding an "e" to the end of her father's last name.

Anna Mac Clarke's mother Nora had three more children, two boys and one girl. Franklin, Lucien, and Evelyn were Anna Mac Clarke's half-siblings, as they only shared the same mother. When Nora died of edema, the four children were raised by their grandmother, Lucy Medley.

== Education ==
On May 28, 1937, Clarke was awarded a diploma from Lawrenceburg High School, which at the time was referred to as the "Colored High School." After graduating from high school, Anna Mac attended Kentucky State College (now KSU). While at Kentucky State, Clarke was a very active student, participating in sports, Delta Sigma Theta sorority, and the school's newspaper, The Kentucky Thorobred. Clarke graduated from Kentucky State College in 1941, earning a bachelor's degree in both sociology and economics.

== World War II ==
After the Attack on Pearl Harbor, Clarke decided to join the military.

In 1942 Clarke trained with the United States Army Fifth Service Command's Signal Corps School in Cincinnati, Ohio. After receiving her training, Anna Mac officially joined the WAAC in Cincinnati on October 3. She went by train to the First Women's Army Auxiliary Corps Training Center at Fort Des Moines, Iowa – the largest WAAC training center for African-Americans. The WAAC Basic and Officer Candidate course were identical to the corresponding courses for men, though women were not expected to study combat subjects and they took a course on women's hygiene. The women studied military sanitation and first aid, military customs and courtesy, map reading, defense against chemical attack, defense against air attack, interior guard, company administration, supply, and management of food. Clarke completed her four-week Basic Training course just prior to Christmas 1942.

== Military career ==
On November 30, 1942, the Officer Candidate School at Fort Des Moines in Iowa –where Clarke was stationed—was desegregated. Within two weeks of the desegregation, Clarke became a candidate in the 15th Officer Class, WAAC OCS Program. By the end of February, Clarke was reassigned to the Fourth Company, Third Regiment, as a Platoon Leader. Third Officer Anna Mac Clarke was the first African-American WAAC assigned to command what was otherwise an all-white unit.

With First Officer Sara E. Murphy, Clarke led a unit of 144 African-American WAACs to serve in Wakeman General Hospital at Camp Atterbury in Indiana. This assignment lasted for only a month, and in June 1943, Clarke worked in the Classification and Assignment Department of WAAC headquarters in Washington, D.C. She enrolled in the Adjutant General's School at Fort Meade, Maryland, and after having completed the training she was assigned to Chicago's WAAC recruiting program. Clarke was promoted to Second Officer on July 16, 1943, and she returned to Fort Des Moines. The Army transformed the auxiliary units of WAAC into the Regular Army, and Clarke became a member of the Women's Army Corps (WAC) in September 1943.

On February 7, 1944, Clarke led the first WAC unit onto the base at Douglas Army Air Field. Located in eastern Arizona, this Army Air Field was one of only four in the U.S. to have both African-American soldiers and WACs. The theater on the post was segregated, and Clarke had been warned by the African-American soldiers not to go. However, Clarke and several women went to the theater, refusing to sit in the Colored section. She protested the enforced segregation to the theater management, her immediate supervisor and then the Commanding Officer, Colonel Harvey E. Dyer. On February 21, 1944, Colonel Dyer issued the order to his officers "to educate properly all enlisted and civilian personnel in your respective departments to accept any colored WACs assigned as you would any white enlisted man or enlisted woman in the Army of the United States. Every consideration, respect, courtesy and toleration will be afforded every colored WAC. No discrimination will be condoned."

== Death ==
In March 1944 Clarke was admitted to a hospital on the base with sharp pains in her side. Doctors diagnosed her with appendicitis, and decided that she needed an appendectomy to save her life. At first it was believed to be a successful surgery and Clarke was expected to make a full recovery. However, gangrene had entered her body due to the infection brought on by the surgery. She died on April 19, 1944, at the age of 24.

A historical marker honoring Clarke stands near the Lawrenceburg, Kentucky courthouse.

== See also ==
- Women's Army Corps
- Army Women's Museum
- Mary McLeod Bethune

== Additional resources ==
- "African American Women in the Military and at War: A Selected Reading List," The Library of Congress. Accessed December 4, 2010. https://www.loc.gov/rr/scitech/SciRefGuides/africanamericanwomenwar.html
- Earley, Charity Adams. One Woman's Army: A Black Officer Remembers the WAC. College Station: Texas A&M University Press, 1989.
- Meyer, Leisa D. Creating GI Jane: Sexuality and Power in the Women's Army Corps during World War II. New York: Columbia University Press, 1998.
- Moore, Brenda L. To Serve My Country, to Serve My Race: The Story of the Only African-American WACS Stationed Overseas During World War II. New York: New York Press, 1997.
- Women's Army Auxiliary Corps, Third Platoon, Company 1
