= Sean Baker (soldier) =

United States Air Force airman

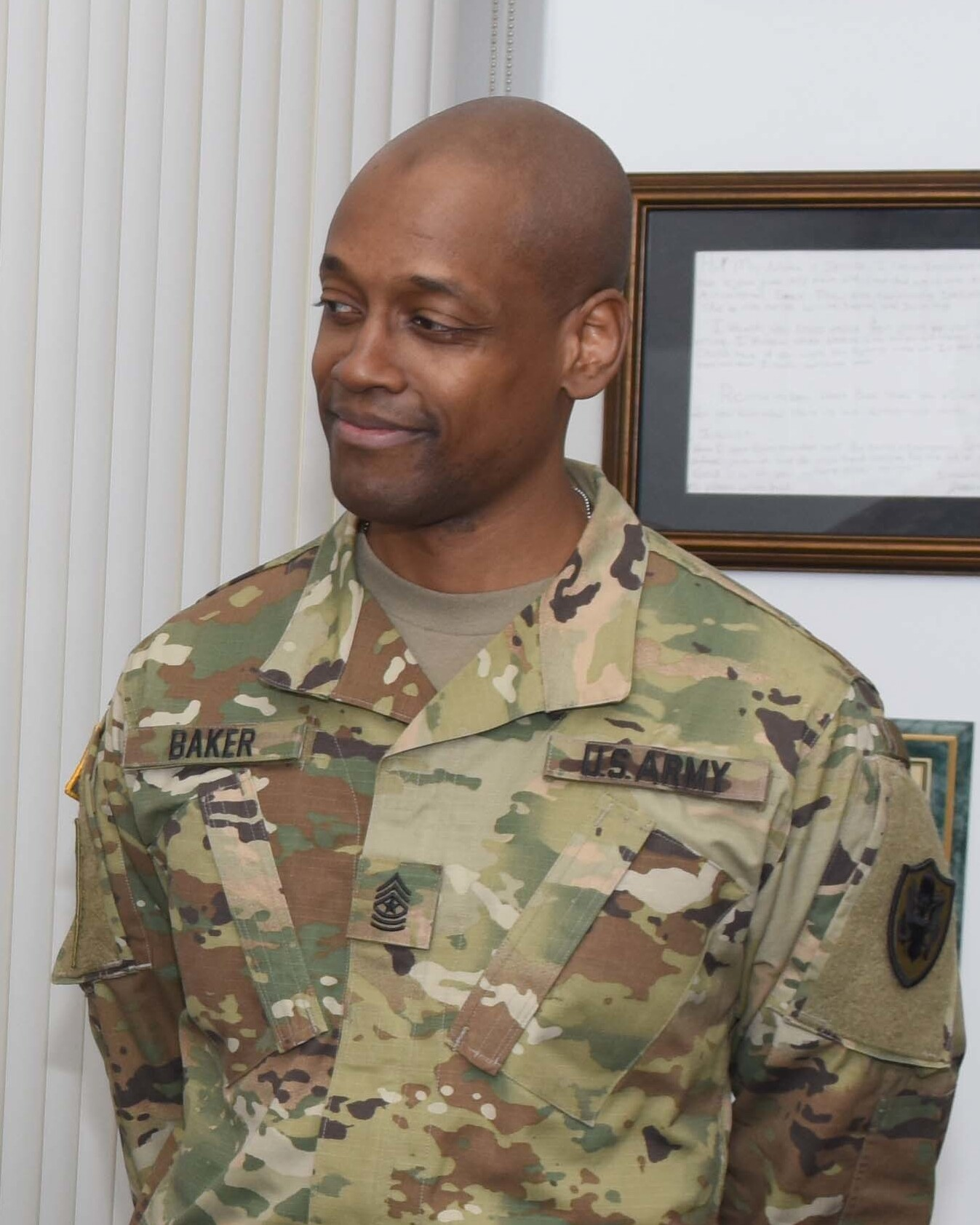
- Baker in 2014
- Born: Lawrenceburg, Kentucky
- Military career
- Allegiance: US
- Branch: United States Air Force; United States Army
- Service years: 1990?-?? (USAF); 2001-2004 (U.S. Army)
- Rank: Specialist (Army)
- Units: 438th Military Police
- Conflicts: Gulf War

Sean Baker is a United States Air Force veteran who was injured in a training drill at Guantanamo Bay Naval Base in 2003, and subsequently discharged.

== Background ==
Baker was a member of the Kentucky Army National Guard. He served during the first Gulf War. In 2003 he was a member of the 438th Military Police at Guantanamo Bay.

== Incident ==
In January 2003, Baker was ordered by an officer at Camp Delta to play the role of a prisoner in a training drill. As per instruction, Baker wore the standard Guantanamo captive's uniforms, an orange prison jumpsuit, over his uniform and crawled under a bunk, so an "internal reaction force" consisting of four (possibly five) soldiers could practice extracting an uncooperative inmate from his cell. The soldiers in the riot squad thought that he was a genuine detainee who had assaulted a sergeant.

During an interview with WLEX, a Kentucky television station, Baker stated that he was beaten severely and that a soldier pressed his head down against the steel floor to the point where he became unable to breathe. Although Baker shouted out the safeword ("red") he had been given to stop the exercise and stated that he was a U.S. soldier, the soldier continued beating Baker's head against the floor and choking him. Only after he ripped his prison jumpsuit in the struggle, revealing that he was wearing a battle dress uniform and government-issue boots underneath, did the beating stop.

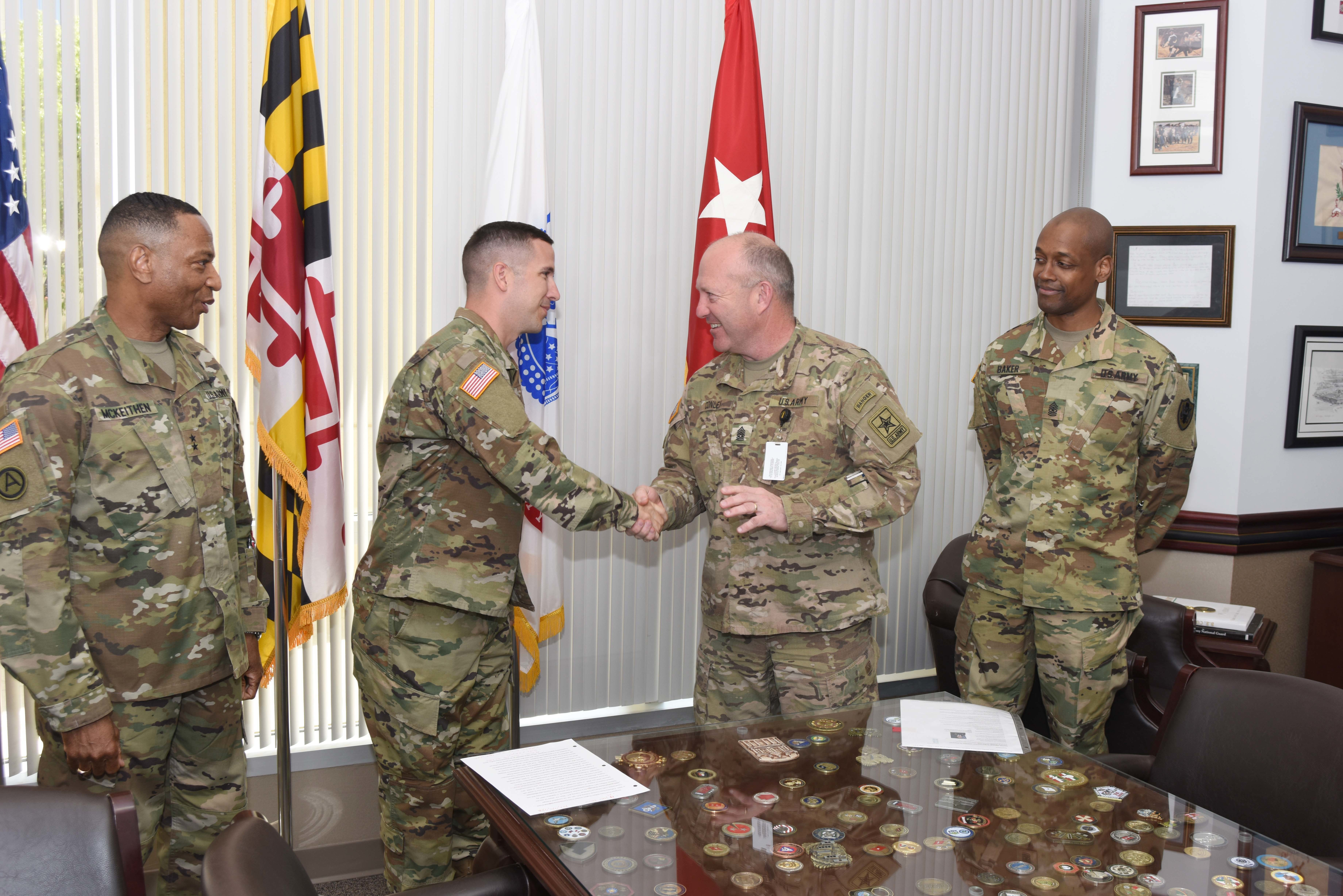

Baker was transported to a military hospital for treatment of head injuries and then transferred to a Navy hospital in Portsmouth, Virginia, where he was treated for six days and given a two-week injury discharge. During that discharge Baker began suffering major seizures indicative of traumatic brain injury, and was sent to Walter Reed Army Medical Center, where he stayed for forty-eight days. Afterwards, he was transferred to light duty with a burial detail at Fort Dix, New Jersey, and received a medical discharge in April 2004.

== After retirement ==
After Baker revealed his story to a Kentucky reporter, a spokeswoman for United States Southern Command questioned the validity of his injuries, and denied that his medical discharge was related to the training drill. However, the Physical Evaluation Board stated in a document on 29 September 2003, that "the TBI was due to soldier playing role of detainee who was non-cooperative and was being extracted from detention cell in Guantanamo Bay, Cuba, during a training exercise."

The Army has since recanted its denial of the relationship between Baker's injury and the training drill, although the spokeswoman continues to claim that the injury was only partly caused by the incident. A military investigation concluded that there was no misconduct that led to Baker's injury. A videotape that should have been made of the incident for training purposes has yet to be found.

A June 2005 BBC story reports Kentucky Congressman Ben Chandler "urged the military to turn over Mr Baker's medical records." The same month, the LA Times quoted an unnamed official: "While it is unfortunate that Spc. Baker was injured, the standards of professionalism we expect of our soldiers mandate that our training be as realistic as possible".

As of June 2005 Baker receives $2,350 a month in military disability benefits, plus $1,000 a month in social security, which he was willing to give up if the Army finds a way to reinstate a position for him.

== Lawsuit ==
Baker filed a lawsuit in May 2005, against Secretary of Defense Donald Rumsfeld, Secretary of the Army Francis J. Harvey, and Secretary of the Navy Gordon R. England, among others. Baker alleges the events in the incident violated his constitutional rights. In his suit Baker is asking for $15 million in compensation and damages, and for re-instatement in the Army. However, due to the 1950 Supreme Court decision in Feres v. United States, Baker is unable to sue.

Baker still "wants to serve his country, in the Army", and has stated that the Army "can find him a job that accommodates his disability".
