= Ballard, Kentucky =

Unincorporated community in Kentucky, United States

Coordinates: 37°55′49″N 84°59′26″W

Ballard is an unincorporated community in Anderson County, in the U.S. state of Kentucky.

== History ==
A post office was established at Ballard in 1893, and remained in operation until 1904. Thomas Ballard was credited with successfully petitioning for the establishment of the post office.
