= Ripyville, Kentucky =

Ghost town in Kentucky, US

Coordinates: 37.99115°N 84.87665°W

Ripyville is a ghost town in Anderson County, in the U.S. state of Kentucky.

A post office was established at Ripyville in 1867, and remained in operation until 1905. The community was named for John Ripy, an early merchant.
