= Rodney Bixler =

American serial killer and rapist

- Born: Rodney Troy Bixler; September 1968 (age 58); Lawrenceburg, Kentucky, U.S.
- Status: Incarcerated
- Convictions: Murder (3 counts); Second degree rape Third degree rape (2 counts); Second degree arson Theft
- Penalty: 40 years imprisonment

Details
- Victims: 3–4
- Span of crimes: February 4 – October 22, 2000
- Country: United States
- State: Kentucky
- Imprisoned at: Northpoint Training Center

Rodney Troy Bixler (born September 1968) is an American serial killer and rapist who strangled three women to death between February and October 2000 in the Bluegrass region of Kentucky. He was sentenced to 40 years imprisonment for these crimes, and provided that he maintains good behavior in prison, Bixler will be released in 2037.

== Previous crimes ==
In 1999, Bixler was acquitted of the rape and sodomy of a 17-year-old girl. The same year, he was convicted of six counts of misusing an ATM card and sentenced to a year in jail. Bixler served about six months in jail for those crimes.

== Murders, trial, and imprisonment ==
On February 4, 2000, Bixler strangled 67-year-old Thelma Cornett in her apartment in Lawrenceburg, Kentucky.

Bixler was suspected of but never charged with drowning 13-year-old Stephanie Ann Claunch on July 25, 2000, in the Kentucky River.

On August 5, 2000, Bixler raped a Lexington woman, tried to strangle her to death, and set fire to her bedroom.

On October 7, 2000, Bixler strangled Heather Wright, a 27-year-old sex worker. Her body was discovered in a stream leading into the Kentucky River.

On October 22, 2000, Bixler strangled 67-year-old Daisy Whitaker in her bathtub. He then stole her car.

Bixler was arrested on November 1, 2000. He was charged with murder for Whitaker's death, as well as one count of second degree rape and two counts of third degree rape for having sex with teenage girls.

In 2003, Bixler pleaded guilty to the rape charges and received a 5-year sentence. Later that year, he was convicted of murder and theft for Whitaker's death. The case against Bixler was circumstantial and he maintained his innocence. The jury recommended a 25-year sentence for murder and a 5-year sentence for theft. The judge sentenced Bixler to 29 years in prison, to be served consecutively with his rape sentences for a total of 35 years.

In 2005, Bixler pleaded guilty to second degree arson in the non-fatal assault and was sentenced to 10 years in prison. In exchange, charges of attempted murder and rape were dismissed.

In 2008, Bixler entered an Alford plea for two counts of murder in the deaths of Cornett and Wright. He received two consecutive 20-year sentences, to be served concurrently with his other sentences.

Bixler is serving his sentence at Northpoint Training Center. He will become eligible for parole on June 1, 2034. If Bixler is not granted parole, he will be released from prison on January 27, 2037, provided he maintains good behavior. If not, he will be released from prison on March 3, 2045.

== See also ==
- List of serial killers in the United States
