= Thomas H. Hanks House =

Historic house in Kentucky, United States

- U.S. National Register of Historic Places
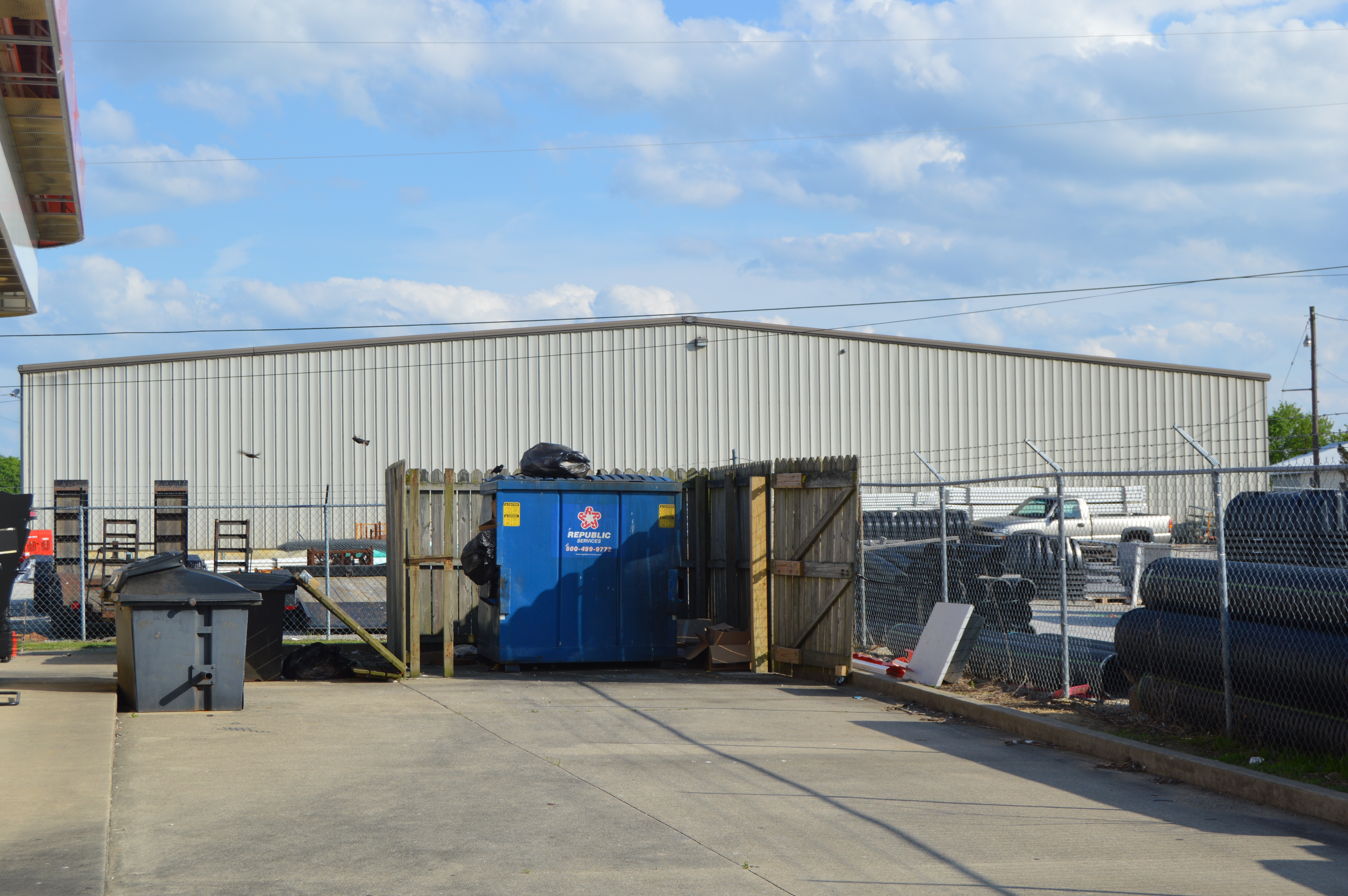
- Former site of house

- Location within Kentucky Location within the United States
- Location: 516 E. Woodford St., Lawrenceburg, Kentucky
- Coordinates: 38°2′21″N 84°53′11″W
- Area: 1 acre (0.40 ha)
- Built: 1858
- Architectural style: Greek Revival
- NRHP reference No.: 80001478
- Added to NRHP: May 14, 1980

The Thomas H. Hanks House, which was located at 516 E. Woodford St. in Lawrenceburg, Kentucky, was a Greek Revival-style house built in 1858. It was listed on the National Register of Historic Places in 1980.

It was a two-story three-bay structure.

Demolished c.1982. Mantle shown in photos 4 & 5 was consigned to an antique dealer in Danville, Kentucky. Disposition unknown.
