= Big Sink Rural Historic District =

Historic district in Kentucky, United States

- U.S. National Register of Historic Places
- Location within Kentucky Location within the United States
- Nearest city: Versailles, Kentucky
- Coordinates: 38°07′17″N 84°43′17″W
- Area: 5,000 acres (20 km^{2})
- Built by: Richard W. Lacefield & Sons
- Architect: Jens Jensen
- Architectural style: Multiple
- MPS: Northwest Woodford County MPS
- NRHP reference No.: 93001523
- Added to NRHP: January 27, 1994

The Big Sink Rural Historic District, in Woodford County, Kentucky near Versailles, Kentucky, is a 5,000 acres (20 km^{2}) historic district which was listed on the National Register of Historic Places in 1994. The listing included Number of 180 contributing buildings, 33 contributing structures, and 44 contributing sites.

It is located west of Midway off Interstate 64.

"The Big Sink Rural Historic District is located in northwest Woodford County, within the Inner Bluegrass region of Kentucky. The District contains the buildings, structures, sites and landscapes that are the physical evidence of historic events, lands use patterns, and associations of a rural agricultural community from c. 1775 through 1943 with significance on a national level. The majority of acres within the District include land that has been devoted to a variety of farming activities for over 200 years."

It includes Airdrie, an estate including 650 acres (2.6 km^{2}) of an original 2,000 acre area purchased by Robert Alexander in 1790. Airdrie includes 19 contributing buildings, including a c.1903 house, the W.E. Simms residence, built by R.W. Lacefield & Sons of Midway, which is "an impressive Colonial Revival mansion". It includes tenant houses, other buildings supporting the main house, and agricultural buildings, as well as a c.1917 landscape designed by landscape architect Jens Jensen. Its stone entry gates (c.1870) on the south side of the Old Frankfort Pike, are a contributing structure.

It includes Woodburn, a two-room school.
