= Confederate Monument in Lawrenceburg =

- U.S. National Register of Historic Places
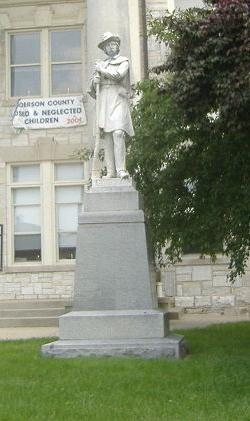

- Location within Kentucky Location within the United States
- Location: Courthouse Lawn, 0.5 mi. S of US 127 and KY 44, Lawrenceburg, Kentucky
- Coordinates: 38.035493°N 84.895527°W
- Area: less than one acre
- Built: 1894
- MPS: Civil War Monuments of Kentucky MPS
- NRHP reference No.: 97000716
- Added to NRHP: July 17, 1997

The Confederate Monument in Lawrenceburg, Kentucky is an 8-foot-tall (2.4 m) carved granite figure on a granite pedestal which was built in 1894 by the Kentucky Women's Monumental Association, a predecessor of the United Daughters of the Confederacy, an organization founded in that year. Its governing body is the government of Lawrenceburg.

It shows a Confederate soldier dressed in a winter coat with a rifle held vertically before him. Around the pedestal of the monument may be found the names of the Confederate companies raised in Anderson County and a list of the men from those companies killed, wounded, died, or survived without injury during the war.

There were a few Civil War skirmishes at Lawrenceburg, The Battle of Lawrenceburg and the Battle of Dog Walk, just before the Battle of Perryville in October 1862. In particular, the Union Ninth Kentucky Cavalry fought the Confederate cavalry under Colonel Scott on October 6, 1862. Confederate troops that would control Frankfort had marched through the town. In later years, the local area saw guerrilla warfare, which forced the creation of a Union Home Guard unit in the town.

On July 17, 1997, the Lawrenceburg Confederate Monument was one of sixty different monuments related to the Civil War in Kentucky placed on the National Register of Historic Places, as part of the Civil War Monuments of Kentucky Multiple Property Submission. It is one of ten monuments of soldiers in the Multiple Property Submission on a courthouse lawn.

The Kentucky Women's Monumental Association was a predecessor of the United Daughters of the Confederacy, an organization founded in 1894. The Kentucky association was one of a number formed to honor "the dead of those who fought for the Southern cause", addressing "the specter of death hung over the South."

The United Daughters of the Confederacy, a unified association that was a successor, actually was named National Association of the Daughters of the Confederacy from 1894 to 1895. It is directly credited with 15 monuments now listed on the U.S. National Register.

In recent years, the UDC has been in the news for winning a court case with Vanderbilt University over continued use of Confederate Memorial Hall as the name of a building financed by the UDC.

== Gallery ==
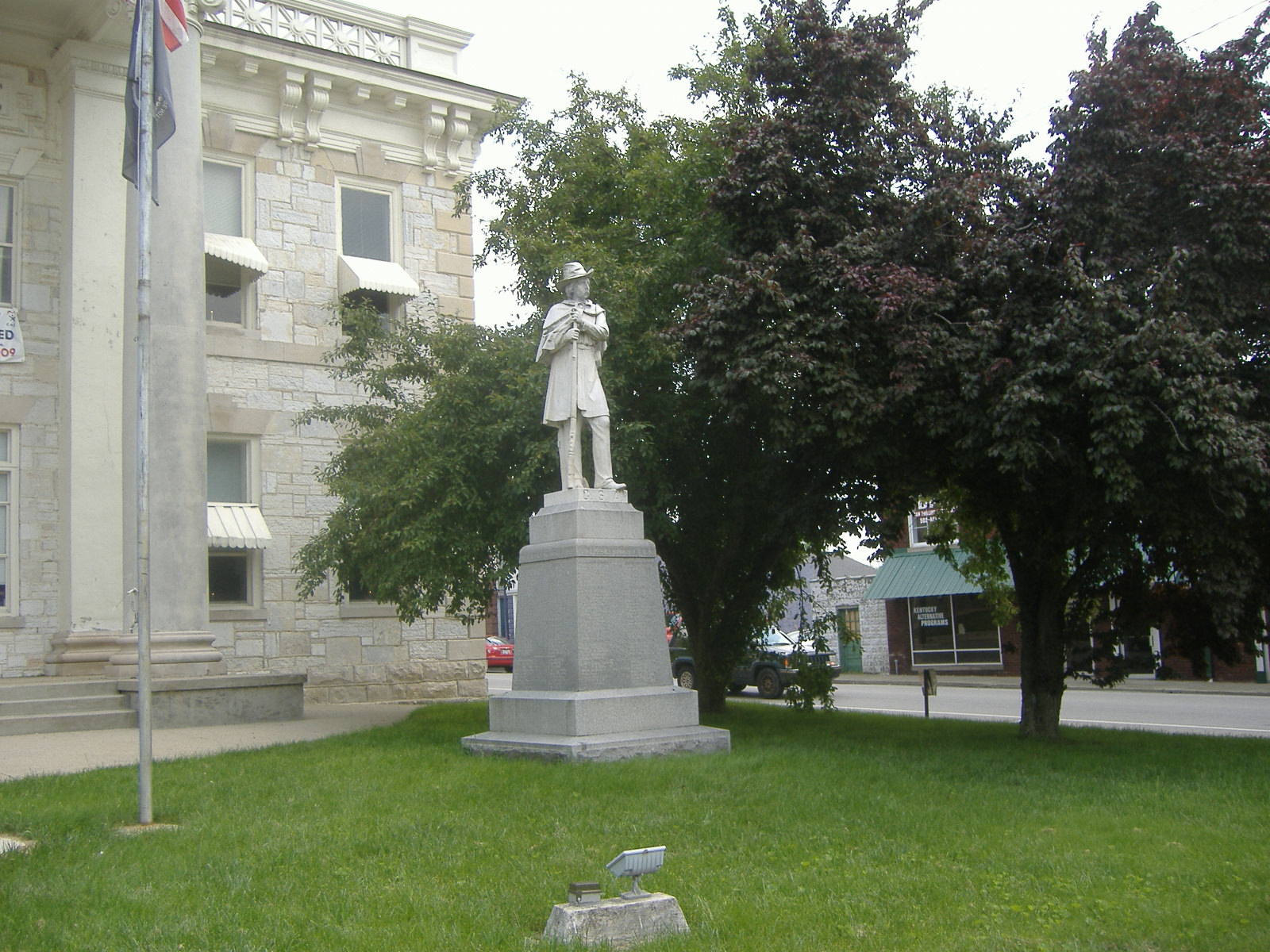
Profile

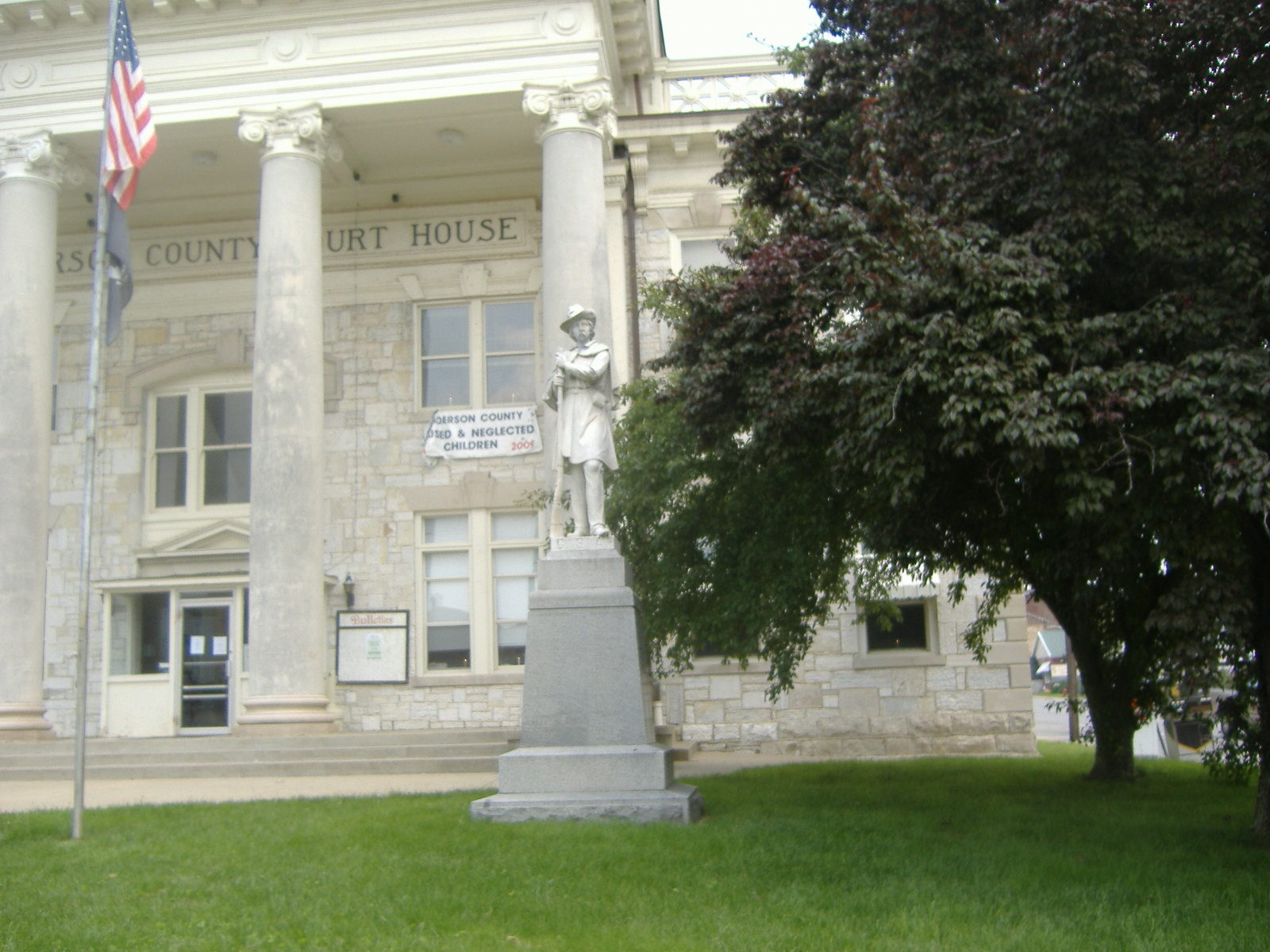
Front
