= Dowling House =

- U.S. National Register of Historic Places
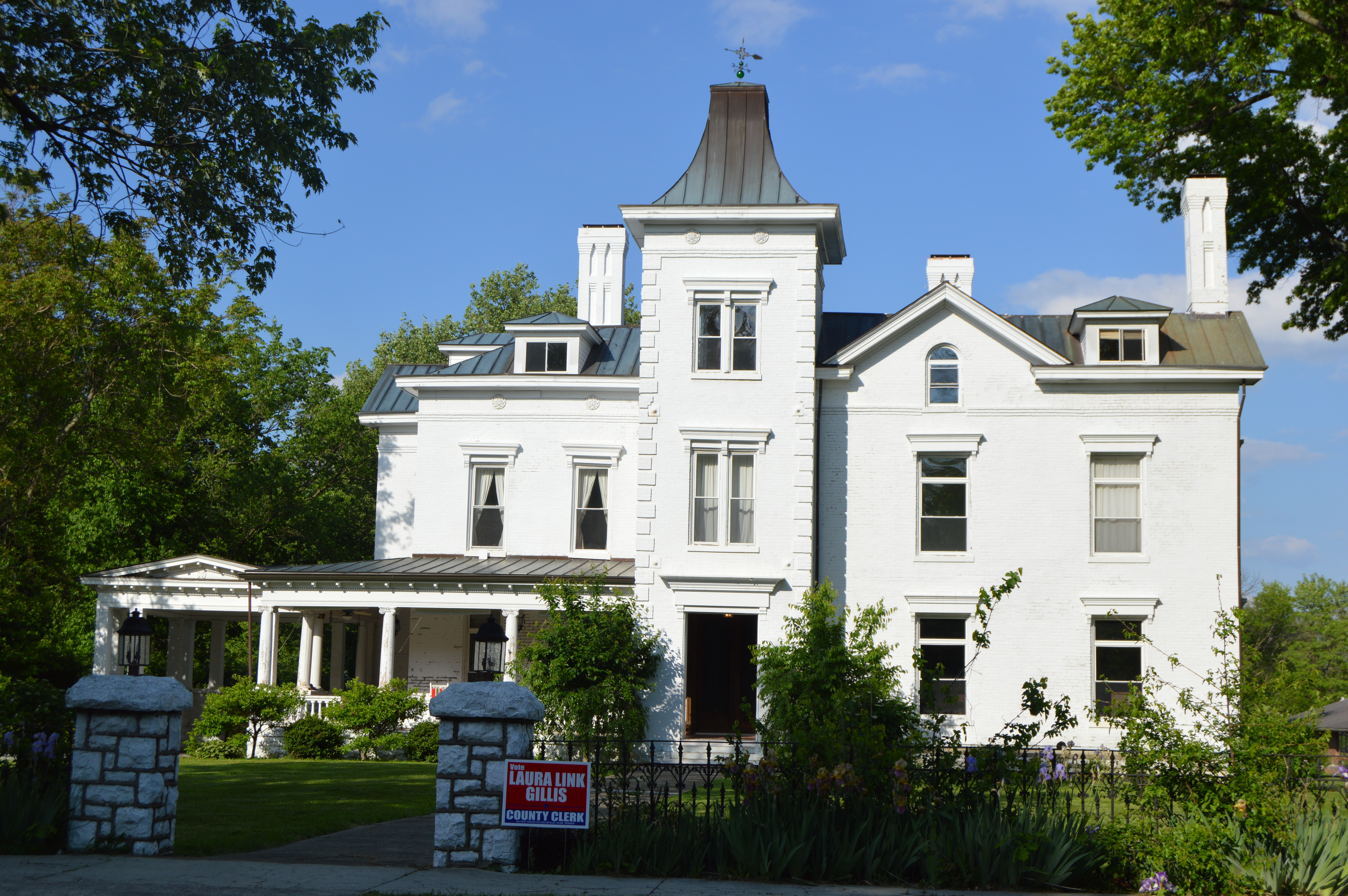

- Location within Kentucky
- Location: 321 S. Main St., Lawrenceburg, Kentucky
- Coordinates: 38°01′59″N 84°53′40″W
- Area: 1.1 acres (0.45 ha)
- Built: 1886, 1915, c.1930
- Architectural style: Italianate, Queen Anne
- NRHP reference No.: 79000957
- Added to NRHP: July 10, 1979

The Dowling House, at 321 S. Main St. in Lawrenceburg, Kentucky, was built in 1886. It was listed on the National Register of Historic Places in 1979.

It is a two-and-a-half-story west-facing brick house, with a three-story central pavilion. It was modified in 1915 and after 1930 and has elements of Italianate and Queen Anne architecture.

The listing included a second contributing building, a carriage house.
