= Big Spring Church =

- U.S. National Register of Historic Places
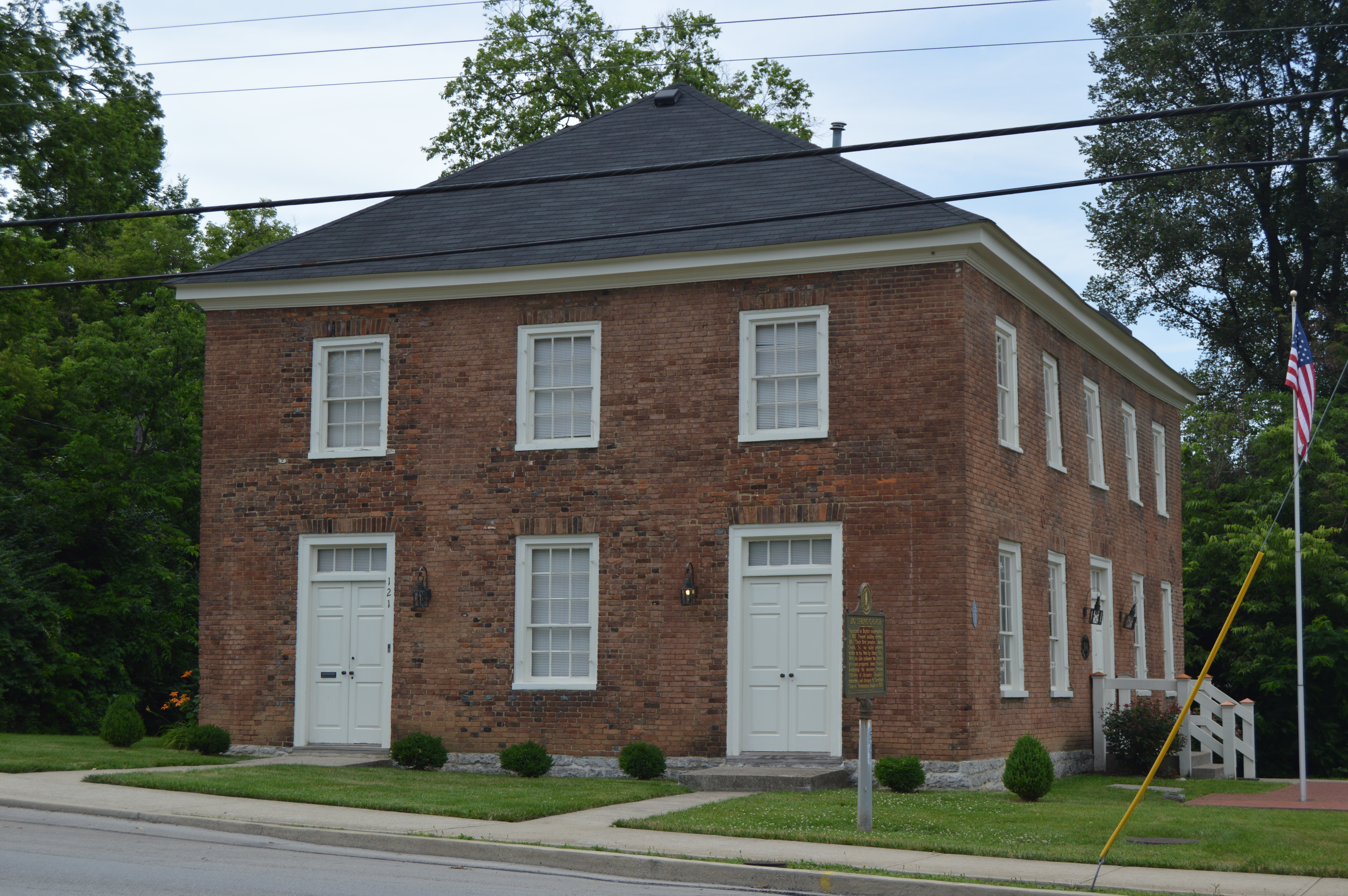

- Location within Kentucky Location within the United States
- Location: 121 Rose Hill St., Versailles, Kentucky
- Coordinates: 38°2′33″N 84°43′56″W
- Area: 0.5 acres (0.20 ha)
- Built: 1819
- Architectural style: Georgian
- NRHP reference No.: 75000842
- Added to NRHP: May 6, 1975

The Big Spring Church, located at 121 Rose Hill St. in Versailles in Woodford County, Kentucky, USA, was built in 1819. It was listed on the National Register of Historic Places in 1975.

It is 47 by 32 feet (14.3 m × 9.8 m) in plan and has three bays on its front and five bays along its sides.

It was built as a Baptist meeting house, at the head of a ravine holding the spring after which it is named.
