= Stringtown, Kentucky =

Stringtown
- Unincorporated community
- Location within the state of Kentucky Stringtown (the United States)
- Coordinates: 38°5′20″N 84°56′6″W
- Country: United States
- State: Kentucky
- County: Anderson
- Elevation: 840 ft (260 m)

Population (2020)
  - Total: 139
- Time zone: UTC-5 (Eastern (EST))
  - Summer (DST): UTC-4 (EDT)
- GNIS feature ID: 485900

Stringtown is an unincorporated community in Anderson County, Kentucky, US, with a population of 200 people, and an elevation of 840 feet.
