= Martin Castle =

Castle in Versailles, Kentucky

Coordinates: 38°02′48″N 84°39′11″W

Kentucky Castle
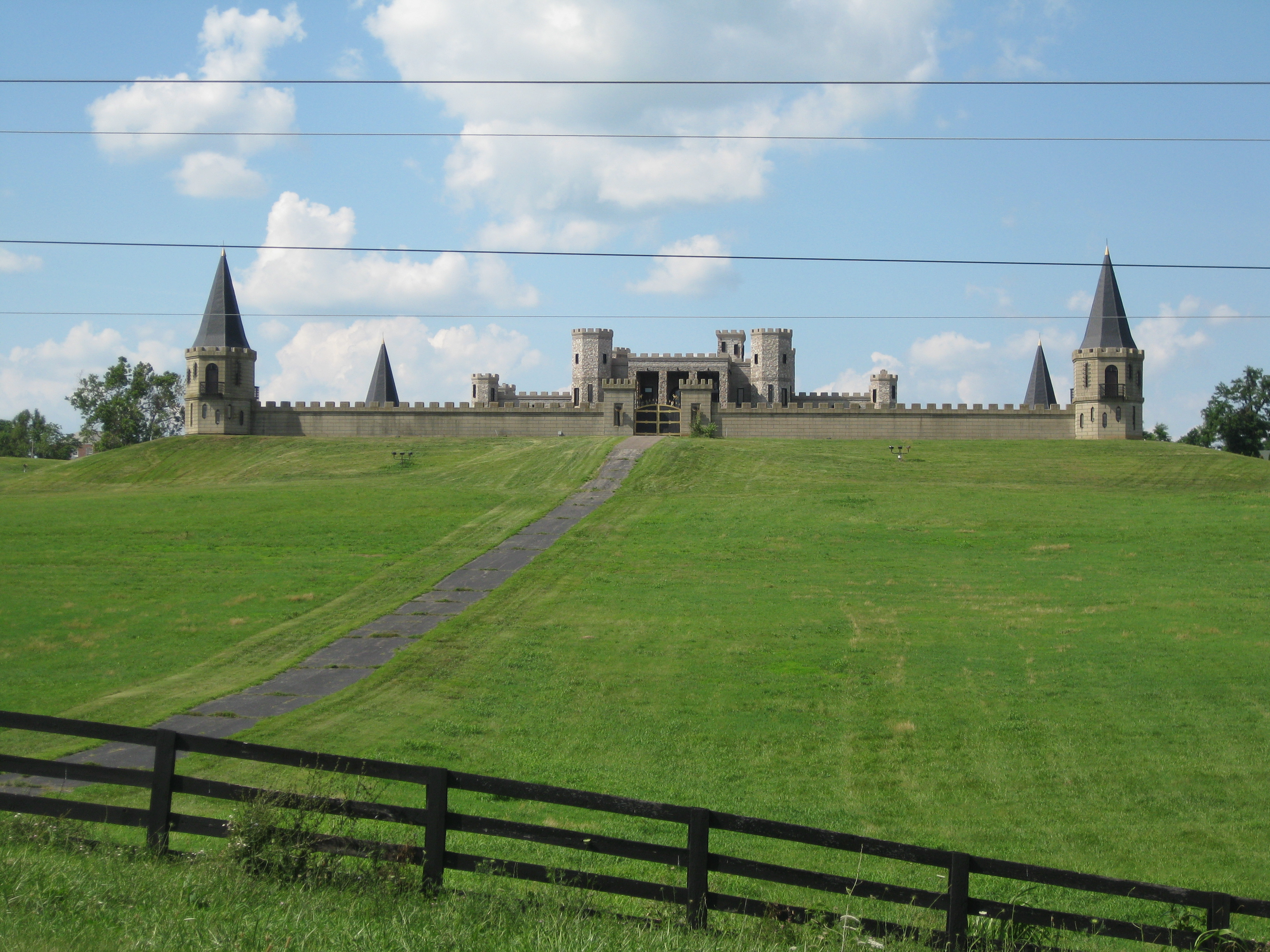
- Kentucky Castle, outside Lexington, Kentucky
- Former names: Versailles Castle; Martin Castle; Castle Post

General information
- Location: Versailles, Kentucky
- Inaugurated: 1969; 56 years ago
- Owner: TKC Hospitality Group; (2023–present)

Website
- www.thekentuckycastle.com

The Kentucky Castle, also known as Castle Post, Martin Castle and Versailles Castle, is a castle in Kentucky, located in Versailles, Kentucky, near Lexington, Kentucky, 201 Pisgah Pike near the Woodford County line, part of a 50 acres (20 ha) estate.

Visually situated off Lexington (Versailles) road, it overlooks the Elkhorn Creek watershed on the Woodford/ Fayette county line. Thirteen years after it was sold and received a major renovation, a new owner focused on revitalizing and remodeling the castle in 2017.

Currently operating as a bed and breakfast and special functions facility, it hosts special events, weddings, and has an operational farm-to-table restaurant inside. In August 2023, TKC Hospitality Group purchased the castle for $19 million.

== History ==
Construction on the castle was started by real estate developer Rex Martin and his wife Caroline Bogaert Martin in 1969, after they had returned from a trip to Germany and were inspired by the architecture and many famous buildings they had seen in Europe. The finished project was to have seven bedrooms, fifteen bathrooms, a fountain in the driveway, and a tennis court. In 1975, the Martins divorced and left the castle unfinished. Over the years, it became a popular oddity and roadside photo-op for tourists. Rex Martin listed it for sale in 1988, but died in 2003 without selling it. In 2003 the so-called "Martin Castle" was sold for 1.8 million dollars to Thomas R. Post, a lawyer from Miami who graduated from University of Kentucky, and the name was changed to "The Castle Post". It had been for sale for many years at a price rumored to be more than 3 million dollars, and there had been talks that it would be turned into a medieval-themed restaurant or a museum.

On May 10, 2004, after months of renovations, an ugly mishap caused newly installed woodwork and wiring to catch fire in the main building. Post, who was at his home in Miami at the time, had already spent months renovating it but vowed to rebuild. Approximately twice the castle's original cost went towards the reconstruction project.

Reconstruction was completed in Fall 2008. New additions include twelve luxury suites, a library, game room, music room, dining hall, ball room, swimming pool, formal garden, basketball court, bar, and tennis court. It is used as a tourist inn, fund raisers, weddings, special events, and corporate functions. It has sixteen bedrooms, four of which are in the outside turrets.

In November 2010, the property was listed for sale at $30,000,000. Post said he would continue to operate it as an inn while it was listed. It was sold in 2017.
