= Mortonsville, Kentucky =

Unincorporated community in Kentucky, United States

Coordinates: 37°58′19″N 84°45′23″W

Mortonsville is an unincorporated community in Woodford County, in the U.S. state of Kentucky.

== History ==
A post office was established at Mortonsville in 1828, and remained in operation until 1921. The community was named for its founder, Jeremiah Morton.
