= Edward M. Blackburn House =

- U.S. National Register of Historic Places
- Location within Kentucky Location within the United States
- Nearest city: Midway, Kentucky
- Coordinates: 38°09′30″N 84°44′02″W
- Area: 3 acres (1.2 ha)
- Built: c.1810
- Architectural style: Federal
- NRHP reference No.: 85003073
- Added to NRHP: December 5, 1985

The Edward M. Blackburn House, near Midway, Kentucky, was built around 1810. It was listed on the National Register of Historic Places in 1985.

It is a one-and-a-half-story Federal style brick house. Its main mass is five bays wide, and there are flanking one-room extensions and a rear ell. Its front entrance is a Palladian doorway with a fanlight.

It has also been known as Equira and later as Hurstland Farm.

It is located in Woodford County, Kentucky on Spring Station Rd.
