= Tyrone, Kentucky =

Unincorporated community in Kentucky, United States

Tyrone
- Unincorporated community
- Location within the state of Kentucky Tyrone (the United States)
- Coordinates: 38°1′58″N 84°50′11″W
- Country: United States
- State: Kentucky
- County: Anderson
- Elevation: 528 ft (161 m)
- Time zone: UTC-5 (Eastern (EST))
  - Summer (DST): UTC-4 (EDT)
- GNIS feature ID: 505753

Tyrone is a ghost town located in Anderson County, Kentucky, United States. It is located east of Lawrenceburg along the Kentucky River.

== History ==
A distillery was opened circa 1868 and acquired by T.B. Ripy, who expanded the facility. The town is named after County Tyrone in Northern Ireland, where the Ripy family was from. The community was originally called Streamville, but was eventually renamed, sometime after the distillery was so named in 1883. In 1905, the sons of T.B. Ripy opened the Ripy Brothers Distillery.

The population of the village reached 1,000 before Prohibition. The distillery closed, but was later re-opened and is now where Wild Turkey (bourbon) is manufactured.

Its post office was opened in 1882 as Coke (the name of the postmaster), was renamed Tyrone in 1893, and is now closed.

== See also ==
- Young's High Bridge
