= Blackburn House (Athens, Alabama) =

Historic house in Alabama, United States

- U.S. National Register of Historic Places
- Alabama Register of Landmarks and Heritage
- Location within Alabama Location within the United States
- Nearest city: Athens, Alabama
- Coordinates: 34°47′32″N 87°3′16″W
- Area: 1.4 acres (0.57 ha)
- Built: 1873
- Architectural style: Saltbox, Italianate
- NRHP reference No.: 84000643

Significant dates
- Added to NRHP: September 20, 1984
- Designated ARLH: June 27, 1983

The Blackburn House (also known as the Blackburn-Mastich House) is a historic residence near Athens, Alabama. The house was built around 1873. It is a one-and-a-half-story Saltbox-style house with an Italianate portico. The portico has four chamfered edge columns supporting a hipped roof. The portico is flanked by two-over-two sash windows on each floor; the same windows are used on the sides on the first floor and for the front rooms on the second floor. Small casement windows are found above the portico and in the attic areas on the rear sides of the house. The house has a center-hall plan with four rooms on the ground floor and two on the upper floor. Since restoration in the early 1980s, the house has served as an antique store. The house was listed on the Alabama Register of Landmarks and Heritage in 1983 and the National Register of Historic Places in 1984.
