= Troy, Kentucky =

Unincorporated community in Kentucky, United States

Troy
- Unincorporated community
- Location within the state of Kentucky Troy (the United States)
- Coordinates: 37°54′36″N 84°41′41″W
- Country: United States
- State: Kentucky
- County: Woodford
- Elevation: 833 ft (254 m)
- Time zone: UTC-5 (Eastern (EST))
  - Summer (DST): UTC-4 (EST)
- GNIS feature ID: 505522

Troy is an unincorporated community that straddles Woodford County and Jessamine County, Kentucky, United States. It is located at the junction of KY 33 and KY 1267. A post office with the name Troy operated at this location from 1859 to 1909. The town may have been named for the town of the same name in New York. The structures in Troy consist of a cluster of farm outbuildings and a few stately houses lining KY 33. The town is surrounded by rolling pastures and sunny fields.
