= Nonesuch, Kentucky =

Unincorporated community in Kentucky, United States

Nonesuch
- Unincorporated community
- Location within the state of Kentucky Nonesuch (the United States)
- Coordinates: 37°54′22″N 84°45′20″W
- Country: United States
- State: Kentucky
- County: Woodford
- Elevation: 817 ft (249 m)
- Time zone: UTC-5 (Eastern (EST))
  - Summer (DST): UTC-4 (EDT)
- GNIS feature ID: 499515

Nonesuch is an unincorporated community in Woodford County, Kentucky, United States. The etymology of the area referred to its ability to maintain great crops for agriculture. Specifically, there was no such place that grew so well.
