= Anderson County, Kentucky =

County in Kentucky, United States

- County
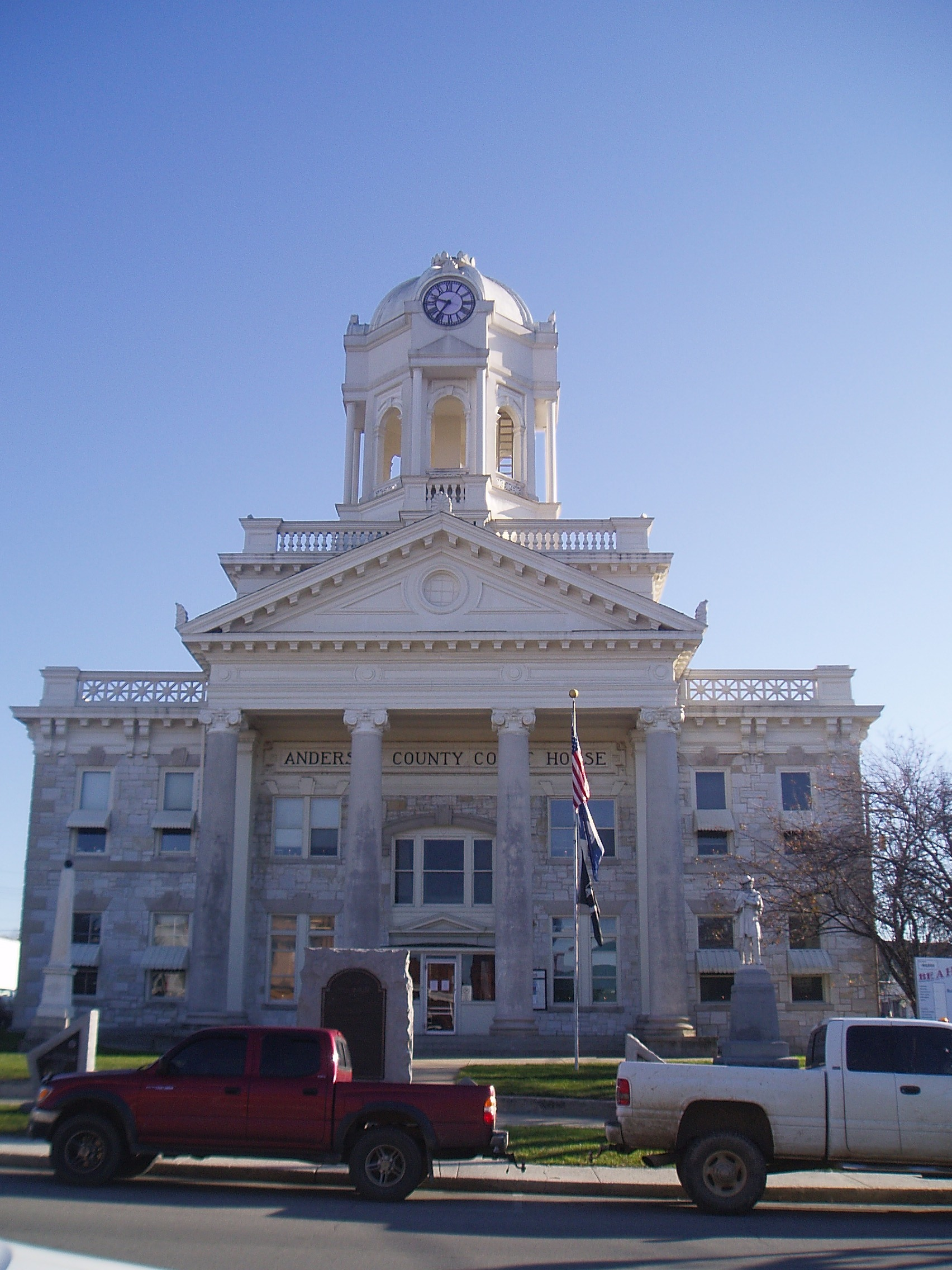
- Anderson County Courthouse in Lawrenceburg

- Location within the U.S. state of Kentucky
- Coordinates: 38°00′N 84°59′W
- Country: United States
- State: Kentucky
- Founded: 1827
- Named for: Richard Clough Anderson Jr.
- Seat: Lawrenceburg
- Largest city: Lawrenceburg

Government
  - Judge/Executive: Orbrey Gritton (R)

Area
  - Total: 204 sq mi (530 km^{2})
  - Land: 202 sq mi (520 km^{2})
  - Water: 2.4 sq mi (6.2 km^{2}) 1.2%

Population (2020)
  - Total: 23,852
  - Estimate (2025): 25,225 ▲
  - Density: 118/sq mi (45.6/km^{2})
- Time zone: UTC−5 (Eastern)
  - Summer (DST): UTC−4 (EDT)
- Congressional districts: 1st, 6th
- Website: andersoncounty.ky.gov

Anderson County, located in the Outer Bluegrass physiographic region, is Kentucky's 48th most populated and ninth fastest-growing county.

On January 16, 1827, the General Assembly of the Commonwealth of Kentucky approved "an ACT to erect and establish the county of Anderson out of parts of the county of Franklin, Washington, and Mercer," which went into effect on February 1, 1827, and established Anderson County as the 82nd county. Additional information in this act regards Anderson County's namesake, Richard Clough Anderson Jr., legislator and U.S. minister plenipotentiary to Colombia, and its county seat, the City of Lawrenceburg. Anderson County's borders were later modified by the General Assembly's January 28, 1854, approval of "an ACT to change the line between the counties of Franklin and Anderson."

Anderson County's 202.17 square miles comprises 25 GNIS-designated populated places, with Lawrenceburg as its largest city in population and size. In addition to its inclusion in the Outer Bluegrass region, Anderson County is part of the Bluegrass Area Development District and the Frankfort Micropolitan Statistical Area.

== Geography ==
GNIS numeric designators:

- "Kentucky" = 21
- "Anderson County" = 5

=== Populated places ===
GNIS Data for Anderson County, KY
feature_id	feature_name	map_name	date_created	date_edited
485900	Alton	Alton Station	1979-09-20	2022-06-07
485902	Alton Station	Alton Station	1979-09-20	2022-06-07
486076	Ashbrook	Ashbrook	1979-09-20	2022-06-07
486157	Avenstoke	Glensboro	1979-09-20	2022-06-07
487337	Birdie	Glensboro	1979-09-20	2022-06-07
491894	Fairview	Ashbrook	1979-09-20	2022-06-07
492406	Fox Creek	McBrayer	1979-09-20	2022-06-07
492908	Glensboro	Glensboro	1979-09-20	2022-06-07
496081	Lawrenceburg	Alton Station	1979-09-20	2022-06-07
497764	McBrayer	McBrayer	1979-09-20	2022-06-07
499488	Ninevah	Alton Station	1979-09-20	2022-06-07
503551	Sinai	Ashbrook	1979-09-20	2022-06-07
504588	Stringtown	Alton Station	1979-09-20	2022-06-07
505753	Tyrone	Tyrone	1979-09-20	2022-06-07
505955	Van Buren	Chaplin	1979-09-20	2022-06-07
507398	Anderson City	Glensboro	1979-09-20	2022-06-07
507444	Ballard	McBrayer	1979-09-20	2022-06-07
507878	Drydock	Ashbrook	1979-09-20	2022-06-07
508078	Gee	Glensboro	1979-09-20	2022-06-07
508230	Hickory Grove	McBrayer	1979-09-20	2022-06-07
508351	Johnsonville	Ashbrook	1979-09-20	2022-06-07
508401	Klondyke	Ashbrook	1979-09-20	2022-06-07
508691	Nevin	McBrayer	1979-09-20	2022-06-07
509103	Sparrow	Chaplin	1979-09-20	2022-06-07
509327	Wayside	Glensboro	1979-09-20	2022-06-07
2566547	Houchin (historical)	Salvisa	November 8, 2009	July 6, 2022
2566549	Jefferies (historical)	Ashbrook	November 8, 2009	July 6, 2022
2566561	Pleasant Grove (historical)	Glensboro	November 8, 2009	July 6, 2022
2566571	Sidney (historical)	McBrayer	November 8, 2009	July 6, 2022

=== Adjacent counties ===
- Franklin County (north)
- Woodford County (east)
- Mercer County (southeast)
- Washington County (south)
- Nelson County (southwest)
- Spencer County (west)
- Shelby County (northwest)

== Demographics ==
Historical population
Census	Pop.	Note	%±
1830	4,520		—
1840	5,452		20.6%
1850	6,260		14.8%
1860	7,404		18.3%
1870	5,449		−26.4%
1880	9,361		71.8%
1890	10,610		13.3%
1900	10,051		−5.3%
1910	10,146		0.9%
1920	9,982		−1.6%
1930	8,494		−14.9%
1940	8,936		5.2%
1950	8,984		0.5%
1960	8,618		−4.1%
1970	9,358		8.6%
1980	12,567		34.3%
1990	14,571		15.9%
2000	19,111		31.2%
2010	21,421		12.1%
2020	23,852		11.3%
2025 (est.)	25,225	▲	5.8%
U.S. Decennial Census; 1790-1960 1900-1990; 1990-2000 2010-2020

=== 2020 census ===
As of the 2020 census, the county had a population of 23,852. The median age was 42.0 years. 23.4% of residents were under the age of 18 and 16.9% of residents were 65 years of age or older. For every 100 females there were 97.5 males, and for every 100 females age 18 and over there were 94.3 males age 18 and over.

The racial makeup of the county was 91.4% White, 2.1% Black or African American, 0.3% American Indian and Alaska Native, 0.4% Asian, 0.0% Native Hawaiian and Pacific Islander, 1.0% from some other race, and 4.8% from two or more races. Hispanic or Latino residents of any race comprised 2.2% of the population.

56.8% of residents lived in urban areas, while 43.2% lived in rural areas.

There were 9,369 households in the county, of which 32.8% had children under the age of 18 living with them and 22.4% had a female householder with no spouse or partner present. About 23.3% of all households were made up of individuals and 10.3% had someone living alone who was 65 years of age or older.

There were 10,044 housing units, of which 6.7% were vacant. Among occupied housing units, 75.2% were owner-occupied and 24.8% were renter-occupied. The homeowner vacancy rate was 1.3% and the rental vacancy rate was 3.8%.

=== Income and poverty ===
The median household income was $55,334, and the median family income was $67,681. Males had a median full-time income of $47,027 versus $38,894 for females. The per capita income for the county was $27,250. About 12.2% of families and 15.7% of the population were below the poverty line, including 23.8% of those under age 18 and 8.7% of those age 65 or over.

U.S. Census Data for Anderson County, Ky
Population
Population Estimates, July 1, 2022, (V2022)	24,224
Population estimates base, April 1, 2020, (V2022)	23,851
Population, percent change - April 1, 2020 (estimates base) to July 1, 2022, (V2022)	1.6%
Population, Census, April 1, 2020	23,852
Population, Census, April 1, 2010	21,421
Age & Sex
Persons under 5 years, percent	5.5%
Persons under 18 years, percent	22.9%
Persons 65 years and over, percent	16.8%
Female persons, percent	50.3%
Race & Hispanic Origin
White alone, percent	94.6%
Black or African American alone, percent	2.4%
American Indian and Alaska Native alone, percent	0.3%
Asian alone, percent	0.7%
Native Hawaiian and Other Pacific Islander alone, percent	0.1%
Two or More Races, percent	1.9%
Hispanic or Latino, percent	2.5%
White alone, not Hispanic or Latino, percent	92.6%
Population Characteristics
Veterans, 2017–2021	1,066
Foreign born persons, percent, 2017–2021	1.4%
Housing
Housing units, July 1, 2022, (V2022)	10,309
Owner-occupied housing unit rate, 2017–2021	79.0%
Median value of owner-occupied housing units, 2017–2021	$169,400
Median selected monthly owner costs -with a mortgage, 2017–2021	$1,225
Median selected monthly owner costs -without a mortgage, 2017–2021	$375
Median gross rent, 2017–2021	$776
Building permits, 2022	192
Families & Living Arrangements
Households, 2017–2021	9,063
Persons per household, 2017–2021	2.60
Living in same house 1 year ago, percent of persons age 1 year+, 2017–2021	88.2%
Language other than English spoken at home, percent of persons age 5 years+, 2017–2021	1.9%
Computer & Internet Use
Households with a computer, percent, 2017–2021	92.2%
Households with a broadband Internet subscription, percent, 2017–2021	85.6%
Education
High school graduate or higher, percent of persons age 25 years+, 2017–2021	91.1%
Bachelor's degree or higher, percent of persons age 25 years+, 2017–2021	25.3%
Health
With a disability, under age 65 years, percent, 2017–2021	15.4%
Persons without health insurance, under age 65 years, percent	7.2%
Economy
In civilian labor force, total, percent of population age 16 years+, 2017–2021	61.0%
In civilian labor force, female, percent of population age 16 years+, 2017–2021	58.7%
Total accommodation and food services sales, 2017 ($1,000)	24,462
Total health care and social assistance receipts/revenue, 2017 ($1,000)	24,331
Total transportation and warehousing receipts/revenue, 2017 ($1,000)	334
Total retail sales, 2017 ($1,000)	237,836
Total retail sales per capita, 2017	$10,546
Transportation
Mean travel time to work (minutes), workers age 16 years+, 2017–2021	27.4
Income & Poverty
Median household income (in 2021 dollars), 2017–2021	$59,887
Per capita income in past 12 months (in 2021 dollars), 2017–2021	$30,294
Persons in poverty, percent	9.0%

== Politics ==
United States presidential election results for Anderson County, Kentucky
Year	Republican		Democratic		Third party(ies)	
Year	No.	%	No.	%	No.	%
1912	579	24.16%	1,391	58.03%	427	17.81%
1916	1,065	40.76%	1,521	58.21%	27	1.03%
1920	1,819	42.01%	2,499	57.71%	12	0.28%
1924	1,419	39.84%	2,089	58.65%	54	1.52%
1928	1,859	51.96%	1,718	48.02%	1	0.03%
1932	1,184	32.58%	2,415	66.46%	35	0.96%
1936	1,360	35.56%	2,454	64.16%	11	0.29%
1940	1,244	33.01%	2,515	66.73%	10	0.27%
1944	1,409	39.37%	2,148	60.02%	22	0.61%
1948	971	30.32%	2,135	66.68%	96	3.00%
1952	1,445	40.06%	2,153	59.69%	9	0.25%
1956	1,878	47.27%	2,089	52.58%	6	0.15%
1960	2,033	49.94%	2,038	50.06%	0	0.00%
1964	1,085	30.26%	2,491	69.46%	10	0.28%
1968	1,594	44.33%	1,334	37.10%	668	18.58%
1972	2,298	62.62%	1,302	35.48%	70	1.91%
1976	1,682	40.71%	2,388	57.79%	62	1.50%
1980	2,052	43.07%	2,567	53.88%	145	3.04%
1984	3,425	66.06%	1,717	33.11%	43	0.83%
1988	3,225	59.17%	2,176	39.93%	49	0.90%
1992	2,731	42.20%	2,491	38.49%	1,250	19.31%
1996	2,972	44.67%	2,898	43.56%	783	11.77%
2000	4,909	61.62%	2,902	36.43%	156	1.96%
2004	6,363	66.34%	3,141	32.75%	87	0.91%
2008	6,885	65.25%	3,462	32.81%	205	1.94%
2012	6,822	66.10%	3,315	32.12%	183	1.77%
2016	8,242	72.16%	2,634	23.06%	546	4.78%
2020	9,661	72.89%	3,348	25.26%	245	1.85%
2024	9,650	73.69%	3,226	24.64%	219	1.67%

=== Elected officials ===
Elected officials as of January 3, 2025
U.S. House	James Comer (R)	KY 1
U.S. House	Andy Barr (R)	KY 6
Ky. Senate	Aaron Reed (R)	7
Ky. House	James Tipton (R)	53

=== Voter registration ===
Anderson County Voter Registration & Party Enrollment as of September 15, 2021
Political Party	Total Voters	Percentage
Republican	9,096	48.11%
Democratic	8,401	44.33%
Others	743	3.93%
Independent	595	3.15%
Libertarian	66	0.35%
Green	2	0.01%
Total	15,760	100%

=== Statewide elections ===
Previous gubernatorial elections results
Year	Republican	Democratic	Third parties
2023	54.66% 5,078	45.34% 4,212	0.00% 0
2019	56.12% 5,380	41.50% 3,978	2.37% 227
2015	55.34% 3,724	39.16% 2,635	5.50% 370
2011	25.99% 1,577	50.23% 3,048	23.78% 1,443
2007	39.46% 2,844	60.54% 4,363	0.00% 0
2003	58.80% 4,052	41.20% 2,839	0.00% 0
1999	14.99% 496	59.28% 1,961	25.73% 851
1995	51.38% 2,783	47.83% 2,591	0.79% 43

== Communities ==
=== City ===
- Lawrenceburg (county seat)

=== Unincorporated communities ===
- Alton
- Ballard
- Glensboro
- McBrayer
- Stringtown

=== Ghost towns ===
- Ripyville
- Tyrone

== See also ==
- Anderson County Schools
- National Register of Historic Places listings in Anderson County, Kentucky
