= Woodford County, Kentucky =

County in Kentucky, United States

- County
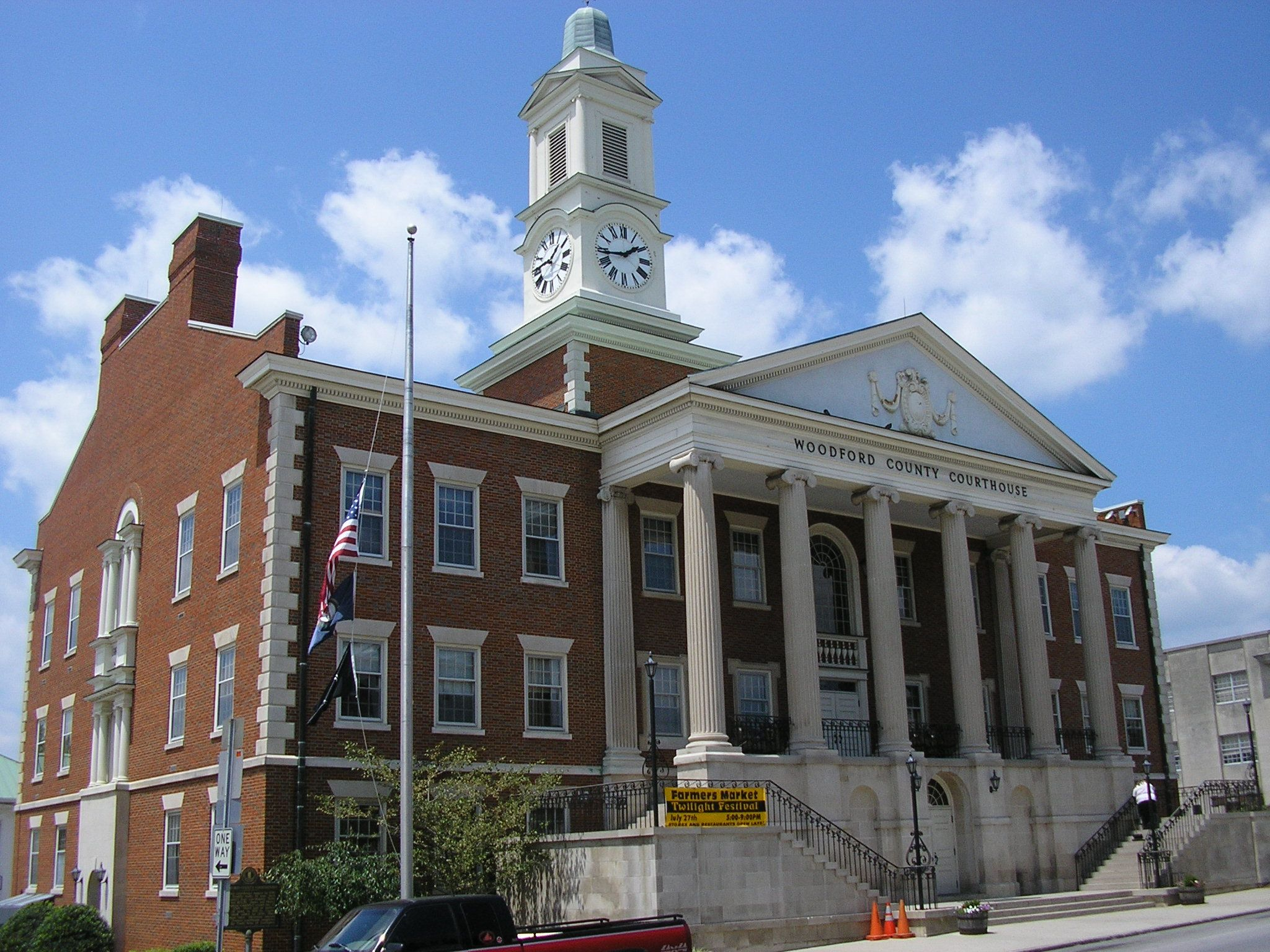
- Woodford County courthouse in Versailles

- Flag Seal

- Location within the U.S. state of Kentucky
- Coordinates: 38°02′N 84°44′W
- Country: United States
- State: Kentucky
- Founded: November 12, 1788
- Named for: William Woodford
- Seat: Versailles
- Largest city: Versailles

Government
  - Judge/Executive: James Kay (D)

Area
  - Total: 192 sq mi (500 km^{2})
  - Land: 189 sq mi (490 km^{2})
  - Water: 3.3 sq mi (8.5 km^{2}) 0.6%

Population (2020)
  - Total: 26,871
  - Estimate (2025): 27,883 ▲
  - Density: 142/sq mi (54.9/km^{2})
- Time zone: UTC−5 (Eastern)
  - Summer (DST): UTC−4 (EDT)
- Congressional district: 6th
- Website: woodfordcounty.ky.gov

Woodford County is a county located in the U.S. state of Kentucky. As of the 2020 census, the population was 26,871. Its county seat is Versailles. The area was home to Pisgah Academy. Woodford County is part of the Lexington-Fayette, KY Metropolitan Statistical Area. It is located in the center of the Bluegrass region of Kentucky.

== History ==
The county was formed from a part of Fayette County, Virginia in 1788. It was named for William Woodford, an American Revolutionary War general from Virginia who died while a prisoner of war in 1780. It was the last of the original nine counties established that formed the Commonwealth of Kentucky in 1792.

Scott County was formed from part of the county in 1792. Franklin County took another part of the county in 1794.

Queen Elizabeth II stayed in Woodford County at Lane's End Farm in May 2007. She also attended the Kentucky Derby in Louisville.

=== Pisgah Academy ===
Pisgah Academy was a school in Woodford County. It was established by Col. Alexander Dunlap. The Library of Congress has photographs of the church and academy.

The Kentucky Historical Society has a photograph of the school building.

== Geography ==
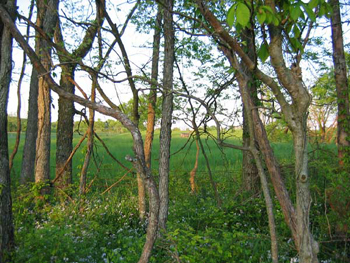
Buckley Wildlife Sanctuary, Woodford County, Kentucky

According to the United States Census Bureau, the county has a total area of 192 square miles (500 km^{2}), of which 189 square miles (490 km^{2}) is land and 3.3 square miles (8.5 km^{2}) (1.7%) is water.

=== Adjacent counties ===
- Franklin County (northwest)
- Scott County (northeast)
- Fayette County (east)
- Jessamine County (southeast)
- Mercer County (southwest)
- Anderson County (west)

== Demographics ==
Historical population
Census	Pop.	Note	%±
1790	9,210		—
1800	6,624		−28.1%
1810	9,659		45.8%
1820	12,207		26.4%
1830	12,273		0.5%
1840	11,740		−4.3%
1850	12,423		5.8%
1860	11,219		−9.7%
1870	8,240		−26.6%
1880	11,800		43.2%
1890	12,380		4.9%
1900	13,134		6.1%
1910	12,571		−4.3%
1920	11,784		−6.3%
1930	10,981		−6.8%
1940	11,847		7.9%
1950	11,212		−5.4%
1960	11,913		6.3%
1970	14,434		21.2%
1980	17,778		23.2%
1990	19,955		12.2%
2000	23,208		16.3%
2010	24,939		7.5%
2020	26,871		7.7%
2025 (est.)	27,883	▲	3.8%
U.S. Decennial Census; 1790-1960 1900-1990; 1990-2000 2010-2020

=== 2020 census ===
As of the 2020 census, the county had a population of 26,871. The median age was 42.9 years. 22.2% of residents were under the age of 18 and 19.4% of residents were 65 years of age or older. For every 100 females there were 93.9 males, and for every 100 females age 18 and over there were 91.5 males age 18 and over.

The racial makeup of the county was 84.5% White, 4.6% Black or African American, 0.4% American Indian and Alaska Native, 0.6% Asian, 0.0% Native Hawaiian and Pacific Islander, 3.8% from some other race, and 6.0% from two or more races. Hispanic or Latino residents of any race comprised 7.5% of the population.

62.8% of residents lived in urban areas, while 37.2% lived in rural areas.

There were 10,736 households in the county, of which 30.6% had children under the age of 18 living with them and 26.0% had a female householder with no spouse or partner present. About 25.5% of all households were made up of individuals and 11.6% had someone living alone who was 65 years of age or older.

There were 11,487 housing units, of which 6.5% were vacant. Among occupied housing units, 71.0% were owner-occupied and 29.0% were renter-occupied. The homeowner vacancy rate was 1.1% and the rental vacancy rate was 4.7%.

=== 2000 census ===
As of the census of 2000, there were 23,208 people, 8,893 households, and 6,643 families residing in the county. The population density was 122 per square mile (47/km^{2}). There were 9,374 housing units at an average density of 49 per square mile (19/km^{2}). The racial makeup of the county was 92.08% White, 5.41% Black or African American, 0.13% Native American, 0.31% Asian, 0.01% Pacific Islander, 1.13% from other races, and 0.93% from two or more races. 2.99% of the population were Hispanic or Latino of any race.

There were 8,893 households, out of which 35.00% had children under the age of 18 living with them, 61.90% were married couples living together, 9.70% had a female householder with no husband present, and 25.30% were non-families. 21.00% of all households were made up of individuals, and 7.50% had someone living alone who was 65 years of age or older. The average household size was 2.57 and the average family size was 2.99.

In the county, the population was spread out, with 25.40% under the age of 18, 7.90% from 18 to 24, 31.20% from 25 to 44, 25.10% from 45 to 64, and 10.40% who were 65 years of age or older. The median age was 37 years. For every 100 females, there were 93.00 males. For every 100 females age 18 and over, there were 91.20 males.

The median income for a household in the county was $49,491, and the median income for a family was $58,218. Males had a median income of $39,284 versus $27,972 for females. The per capita income for the county was $22,839. About 5.20% of families and 7.30% of the population were below the poverty line, including 8.00% of those under age 18 and 13.10% of those age 65 or over.

== Arts and culture ==
=== Tourism ===
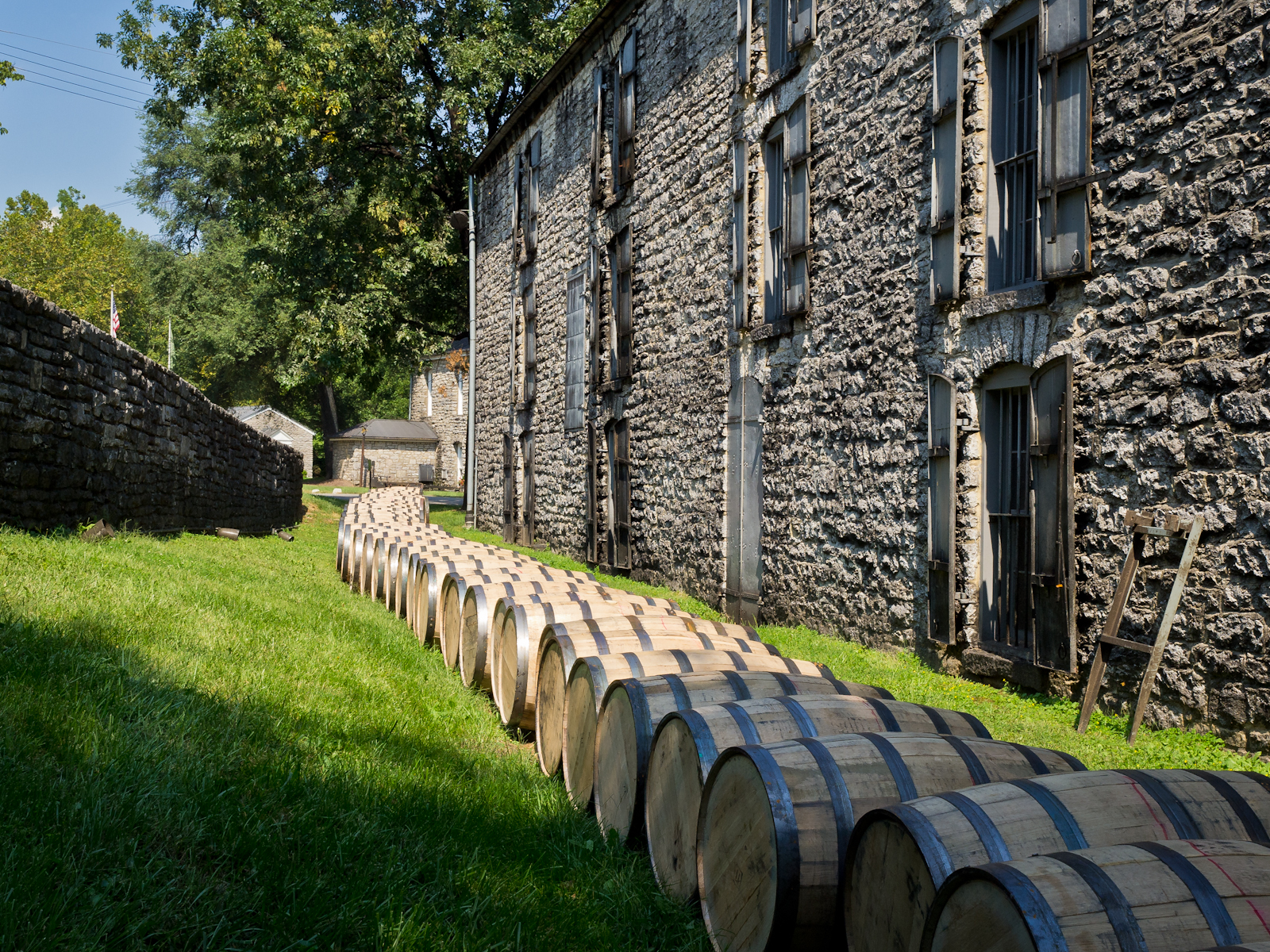
Barrels of bourbon outside the Woodford Reserve Distillery

Woodford County is home to one of Kentucky's oldest bourbon whiskey distilleries, Labrot & Graham (established 1812, now owned by Brown–Forman, which produces the Woodford Reserve brand); the Life Adventure Center, an equine and outdoor experience to assist youth affected by trauma; and the Kentucky Castle.

== Education ==
- Huntertown Elementary
- Northside Elementary
- Southside Elementary
- St. Leo's (Serves K-8/Private)
- Simmons Elementary
- Woodford County High School
- Woodford County Middle School
- Woodford Christian School K-5 (Private)
- Midway University

== Politics ==
United States presidential election results for Woodford County, Kentucky
Year	Republican		Democratic		Third party(ies)	
Year	No.	%	No.	%	No.	%
1912	779	27.87%	1,561	55.85%	455	16.28%
1916	1,300	41.85%	1,786	57.50%	20	0.64%
1920	2,218	40.02%	3,299	59.53%	25	0.45%
1924	2,091	45.69%	2,472	54.02%	13	0.28%
1928	2,490	54.71%	2,056	45.18%	5	0.11%
1932	1,720	34.97%	3,180	64.66%	18	0.37%
1936	1,558	37.65%	2,574	62.20%	6	0.14%
1940	1,514	36.47%	2,630	63.36%	7	0.17%
1944	1,374	38.79%	2,154	60.81%	14	0.40%
1948	1,229	33.16%	2,175	58.69%	302	8.15%
1952	1,845	44.23%	2,319	55.60%	7	0.17%
1956	2,170	50.97%	2,027	47.62%	60	1.41%
1960	2,227	53.32%	1,950	46.68%	0	0.00%
1964	1,215	28.84%	2,974	70.59%	24	0.57%
1968	1,901	42.51%	1,646	36.81%	925	20.68%
1972	3,363	70.34%	1,268	26.52%	150	3.14%
1976	2,646	48.42%	2,689	49.20%	130	2.38%
1980	3,105	47.66%	3,122	47.92%	288	4.42%
1984	4,746	66.73%	2,290	32.20%	76	1.07%
1988	4,512	62.63%	2,653	36.83%	39	0.54%
1992	3,992	45.75%	3,161	36.23%	1,572	18.02%
1996	4,270	47.57%	3,910	43.56%	797	8.88%
2000	5,890	58.10%	3,995	39.41%	252	2.49%
2004	6,937	60.31%	4,480	38.95%	85	0.74%
2008	7,130	57.98%	5,027	40.88%	140	1.14%
2012	7,219	58.54%	4,883	39.60%	230	1.87%
2016	7,697	56.75%	4,958	36.56%	908	6.69%
2020	8,362	54.97%	6,530	42.93%	319	2.10%
2024	8,419	56.15%	6,282	41.90%	292	1.95%

Since 1956, Woodford County has generally voted Republican at the federal level. However, it sometimes votes for Democrats statewide, which it did for Andy Beshear in the 2019 and 2023 gubernatorial elections.

The county voted "No" on 2022 Kentucky Amendment 2, an anti-abortion ballot measure, by 61% to 39%, and backed Donald Trump with 55% of the vote to Joe Biden's 43% in the 2020 presidential election.

=== Elected officials ===
Elected officials as of January 3, 2025
U.S. House	Andy Barr (R)	KY 6
Ky. Senate	Amanda Mays Bledsoe (R)	12
Ky. House	Daniel Fister (R)	56

== Notable residents ==
- William Taylor Barry
- Dr. Lyman Beecher, for one year
- James W. Blackburn, former secretary of state of Kentucky
- Joseph Clay Stiles Blackburn, former U.S. senator, representative, and governor of Panama Canal Zone
- Luke P. Blackburn, former governor of Kentucky
- John Cabell Breckinridge, vice-president of the United States
- William Campbell Preston Breckinridge, Representative from Kentucky
- John Buford, Union cavalry officer during the American Civil War, was born in Woodford County but grew up in Illinois.
- Alexander Campbell
- Albert Benjamin "Happy" Chandler, Sr., Governor of Kentucky, baseball commissioner
- Ben Chandler, U.S. Representative
- James Clark
- John Conlee, country music singer
- John J. Crittenden, governor of Kentucky
- Charles W. Field, United States Army officer and Doorkeeper of the United States House of Representatives
- Chris Hogan, New York Times best-selling author, motivational speaker, financial guru
- George B. Kinkead, who served as Kentucky secretary of state
- Thomas Marshall (1730–1802), colonel of the 3rd Virginia Regiment in the American Revolution; father of the future Chief Justice John Marshall
- Chad Pennington, former NFL quarterback
- Charles Scott, Brig. General during the American Revolution and fourth Governor of Kentucky 1808-12
- William Shatner, actor
- William T. Sterling, Wisconsin legislator and pioneer
- William A. Trimble, United States Senator

== Communities ==
=== Cities ===
- Midway
- Versailles (county seat)

=== Unincorporated communities ===
- Millville
- Nonesuch
- Mortonsville
- Milner
- Pinckard
- Huntertown
- Mundy's Landing
- Pisgah
- Wallace
- Troy
- Keene
- Jackson Town
- Clover Bottom

== See also ==
- National Register of Historic Places listings in Woodford County, Kentucky
