= Lawrenceburg, Kentucky =

- City
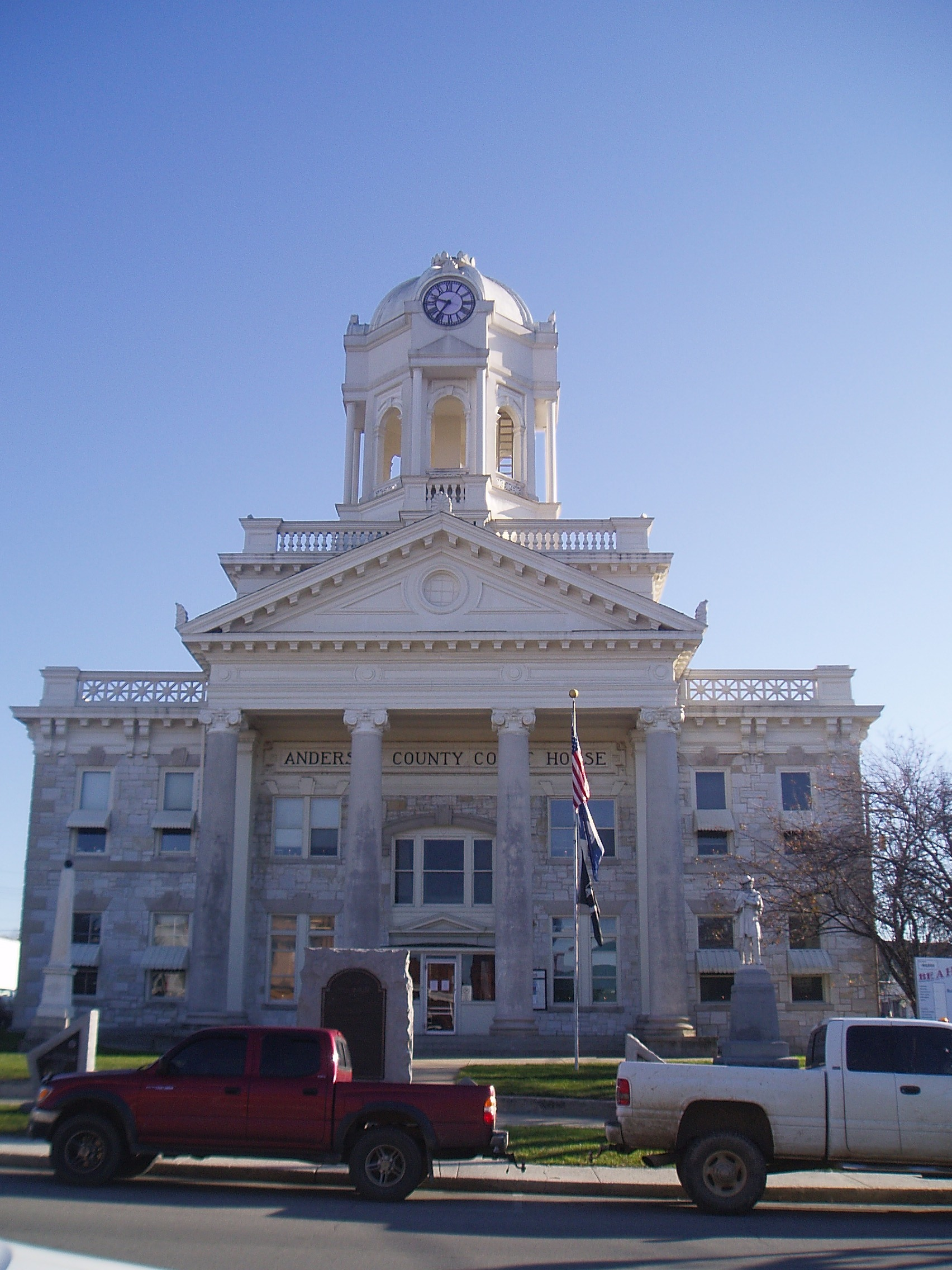
- Anderson County Courthouse in Lawrenceburg

- Seal

- Location of Lawrenceburg in Anderson County, Kentucky.

- Location within the state of Kentucky Lawrenceburg (the United States)
- Coordinates: 38°01′59″N 84°54′11″W
- Country: United States
- State: Kentucky
- County: Anderson
- Established: 1820
- Incorporated: 1850
- Named for: a local landowner

Government
  - Mayor: Troy L. Young

Area
  - Total: 6.05 sq mi (15.66 km^{2})
  - Land: 5.81 sq mi (15.06 km^{2})
  - Water: 0.027 sq mi (0.07 km^{2})
- Elevation: 758 ft (231 m)

Population (2020)
  - Total: 11,728
  - Estimate (2023): 12,495
  - Density: 2,017/sq mi (778.8/km^{2})
- Time zone: UTC-5 (EST)
  - Summer (DST): UTC-4 (EDT)
- ZIP code: 40342
- Area code: 502
- FIPS code: 21-44146
- GNIS feature ID: 2404895
- Website: www.lawrenceburgky.org

Lawrenceburg is a home rule-class city in Anderson County, Kentucky, United States. The population was 11,728 at the 2020 census. It is the seat of its county. Lawrenceburg is part of the Frankfort, Kentucky, micropolitan statistical area.

== History ==
The site of Lawrenceburg was settled in the early 1780s by a German immigrant named Jacob Kaufman and was first called Kaufman's or Coffman's Station. The post office was established as Lawrenceburg on January 22, 1817, for William Lawrence, a local tavern owner. The community was incorporated as Lawrence in 1820 by the Court of Franklin County (of which it was then a part) but renamed Lawrenceburg in 1827. James Lawrence, a naval officer, is the namesake.

The city was formally incorporated by the state assembly in 1850.

The Four Roses distillery in Lawrenceburg was founded in 1888 and the physical distillery was built in 1910 in Spanish Mission-style architecture, and it is listed on the National Register of Historic Places. The Wild Turkey bourbon distillery is also located in Lawrenceburg.

== Geography ==
According to the United States Census Bureau, the city has a total area of 3.7 square miles (9.6 km^{2}), all land.

=== Climate ===
Climate data for Lawrenceburg, Kentucky (1991-2020 precipitation normals)Elevation: 825 feet (251 metres). Lat: 37.9597° N Lon: 84.8904° W
Month	Jan	Feb	Mar	Apr	May	Jun	Jul	Aug	Sep	Oct	Nov	Dec	Year
Average precipitation inches	3.57	3.66	4.93	4.54	5.13	4.95	5.03	3.67	3.47	3.75	3.59	4.38	50.67
Average precipitation mm	91	93	125	115	130	126	128	93	88	95	91	111	1,286
Source: NOAA

== Demographics ==
Historical population
Census	Pop.	Note	%±
1830	297		—
1870	393		—
1880	638		62.3%
1890	1,382		116.6%
1900	1,253		−9.3%
1910	1,723		37.5%
1920	1,811		5.1%
1930	1,763		−2.7%
1940	2,046		16.1%
1950	2,369		15.8%
1960	2,523		6.5%
1970	3,579		41.9%
1980	5,167		44.4%
1990	5,911		14.4%
2000	9,014		52.5%
2010	10,505		16.5%
2020	11,728		11.6%
2024 (est.)	12,189		3.9%
U.S. Decennial Census

=== 2020 census ===
As of the 2020 census, Lawrenceburg had a population of 11,728. The median age was 37.4 years. 25.0% of residents were under the age of 18 and 15.5% of residents were 65 years of age or older. For every 100 females there were 92.5 males, and for every 100 females age 18 and over there were 87.0 males age 18 and over.

99.6% of residents lived in urban areas, while 0.4% lived in rural areas.

There were 4,678 households in Lawrenceburg, of which 34.8% had children under the age of 18 living in them. Of all households, 46.2% were married-couple households, 16.3% were households with a male householder and no spouse or partner present, and 29.5% were households with a female householder and no spouse or partner present. About 27.0% of all households were made up of individuals and 11.4% had someone living alone who was 65 years of age or older.

There were 4,958 housing units, of which 5.6% were vacant. The homeowner vacancy rate was 1.9% and the rental vacancy rate was 3.6%.

Racial composition as of the 2020 census
Race	Number	Percent
White	10,425	88.9%
Black or African American	373	3.2%
American Indian and Alaska Native	25	0.2%
Asian	72	0.6%
Native Hawaiian and Other Pacific Islander	4	0.0%
Some other race	161	1.4%
Two or more races	668	5.7%
Hispanic or Latino (of any race)	327	2.8%

=== 2010 census ===
As of the 2010 census, there were 10,505 people, 4,194 households, and 2,882 families residing in the city. The population density was 2,839.19 per square mile (1,096.22/km^{2}). There were 4,582 housing units at an average density of 1,238.38 per square mile (478.14/km^{2}). The racial makeup of the city was 93.3% White, 3.2% African American, 0.2% Native American, 0.8% Asian, 0.0% Pacific Islander, 0.9% from other races, and 1.5% from two or more races. Hispanics or Latinos of any race were 1.9% of the population.

There were 4,194 households, out of which 34.9% had children under the age of 18 living with them, 47.7% were married couples living together, 15.7% had a female householder with no husband present, and 31.3% were non-families. 26.3% of all households were made up of individuals living alone, and 10.0% had someone living alone who was 65 years of age or older. The average household size was 2.48 and the average family size was 2.96.

The age distribution was 26.7% under 18, 5.7% from 20 to 24, 29.9% from 25 to 44, 23.3% from 45 to 64, and 12.1% who were 65 or older. The median age was 35.2 years. For every 100 females, there were 88.2 males. For every 100 females age 18 and over, there were 82.6 males.

The median income for a household in the city was $44,778, and the median income for a family was $58,582. Males had a median income of $38,040 versus $35,184 for females. The per capita income for the city was $21,427. About 9.1% of families and 13.5% of the population were below the poverty line, including 23.2% of those under age 18 and 8.5% of those age 65 or over.

== Arts and culture ==
Lawrenceburg has a lending library, the Anderson Public Library.

Kavanaugh School, founded in 1904, served as a preparatory academy for candidates to the U.S. Naval Academy and the U.S. Military Academy.

== Education ==
=== Primary schools ===
- Early Childhood Center
- Emma B. Ward Elementary School
- Robert B. Turner Elementary School
- Saffell Street Elementary School
- Christian Academy of Lawrenceburg (private)
- Creative Minds Academy (private)

=== Secondary schools ===
- Anderson County Middle School
- Anderson County High School
- Christian Academy of Lawrenceburg (private)
- Harvest Christian School (private)

=== Colleges ===
- Bluegrass Community and Technical College

== Notable people ==
- Sean Baker, a military policeman who was injured during training at Guantanamo—without his military superiors being held accountable.
- Rodney Bixler, serial killer
- James Beauchamp Clark, Speaker of the United States House of Representatives from 1911 to 1919.
- Nelson Chittum, former MLB pitcher
- Anna Mac Clarke, first black Women's Army Auxiliary Corps assigned to duty with an all-white company as platoon commander (4th Co., 3rd Regt.).
- Andrew McKee, submarine pioneer.
- Ted Turner, Major League Baseball pitcher who played in 1920 with the Chicago Cubs.

== See also ==
- Confederate Monument in Lawrenceburg
- The Anderson News
- The Flim-Flam Man
