= National Register of Historic Places listings in Scott County, Kentucky =

Location of Scott County in Kentucky

This is a list of the National Register of Historic Places listings in Scott County, Kentucky.

This is intended to be a complete list of the properties and districts on the National Register of Historic Places in Scott County, Kentucky, United States. The locations of National Register properties and districts for which the latitude and longitude coordinates are included below, may be seen in a Google map.

There are 82 properties and districts listed on the National Register in the county.

This National Park Service list is complete through NPS recent listings posted October 30, 2026.

== Current listings ==
	Name on the Register	Image	Date listed	Location	City or town	Description
1	Allenhurst		April 2, 1973 (#73000829)	Cane Run Pike west of Georgetown; 38°11′31″N 84°36′55″W	Georgetown	
2	Audubon		December 4, 1973 (#73000830)	Southwest of Georgetown off U.S. Route 62, on Moore's Mill Pike; 38°09′18″N 84°37′22″W	Georgetown	
3	Julius Blackburn House		April 14, 1977 (#77000641)	West of Georgetown off U.S. Route 460; 38°13′49″N 84°43′27″W	Georgetown	
4	Alexander Bradford House		June 27, 1974 (#74000905)	Main St. at Locust Fork Pike; 38°16′21″N 84°41′16″W	Stamping Ground	
5	Fielding Bradford House		December 4, 1973 (#73000831)	North of Georgetown off U.S. Route 25 on Long Lick Pike; 38°14′42″N 84°34′46″W	Georgetown	
6	John W. Bradley House		November 5, 1974 (#74000898)	Southwest of Georgetown off U.S. Route 62; 38°11′32″N 84°35′52″W	Georgetown	
7	Branham House	Branham House	April 2, 1973 (#73000832)	208 S. Broadway; 38°12′29″N 84°33′36″W	Georgetown	
8	Richard Branham House		June 23, 1983 (#83002863)	Prate Rd. 38°13′47″N 84°39′29″W	Midway	
9	James Briscoe Quarters		June 23, 1983 (#83002864)	Off U.S. Route 25; 38°15′08″N 84°33′39″W	Delaplain	
10	Vivion Upshaw Brooking House		May 28, 1975 (#75000824)	West of Georgetown off Stamping Ground Pike (KY 227); 38°13′16″N 84°38′19″W	Georgetown	
11	Buford-Duke House		June 19, 1973 (#73000833)	Southeast of Georgetown off KY 1963; 38°10′19″N 84°31′54″W	Georgetown	
12	Joseph Fields Burgess House		November 29, 1984 (#84000368)	Off U.S. Route 25 and the southwestern corner of KY 608; 38°25′57″N 84°34′00″W	Sadieville	No longer extant.
13	William Campbell House		November 29, 1984 (#84000415)	Off U.S. Route 227; 38°15′42″N 84°39′56″W	Stamping Ground	
14	Cantrill House	Cantrill House	April 2, 1973 (#73000834)	324 E. Jackson St. 38°12′23″N 84°33′22″W	Georgetown	
15	Cardome	Cardome	March 13, 1975 (#75000825)	0.5 miles north of Georgetown on U.S. Route 25; 38°13′21″N 84°34′03″W	Georgetown	
16	Choctaw Indian Academy		March 7, 1973 (#73000835)	4.5 miles west of Georgetown off U.S. Route 227; 38°13′55″N 84°38′05″W	Georgetown	
17	Confederate Monument in Georgetown	Confederate Monument in Georgetown	July 17, 1997 (#97000669)	Georgetown Cemetery, 0.5 miles south of the junction of U.S. Route 25 and KY 1692; 38°11′53″N 84°33′38″W	Georgetown	
18	Rhodin Coppage Spring House		June 23, 1983 (#83002865)	Off U.S. Route 25; 38°14′44″N 84°33′37″W	Georgetown	
19	Newton Craig House and Penitentiary Buildings Complex	Newton Craig House and Penitentiary Buildings Complex	July 19, 1984 (#84001980)	U.S. Route 460; 38°12′34″N 84°38′06″W	Georgetown	
20	Craig-Johnson Mill Dam and Mill Sites		June 10, 1975 (#75000828)	Address Restricted	Great Crossing	
21	Craig-Peak House		August 2, 2017 (#100001428)	556 Cane Run Rd. 38°11′31″N 84°36′34″W	Georgetown	
22	Dry Run Site		December 5, 1985 (#85003041)	Address Restricted	Georgetown	
23	Edge Hill Farm		March 1, 1984 (#84001983)	1661 Payne's Depot Pike; 38°11′12″N 84°35′42″W	Georgetown	
24	Elkwood		January 20, 1978 (#78001395)	Northwest of Georgetown; 38°13′35″N 84°35′47″W	Georgetown	
25	Elmwood		November 19, 1974 (#74000899)	Northeast of Georgetown off U.S. Routes 227 and 460; 38°13′33″N 84°30′51″W	Georgetown	
26	Ash Emison Quarters		June 23, 1983 (#83002866)	Off U.S. 25; 38°15′34″N 84°33′23″W	Delaplain	
27	First African Baptist Church and Parsonage	First African Baptist Church and Parsonage	March 1, 1984 (#84001985)	209-211 W. Jefferson St. 38°12′45″N 84°33′40″W	Georgetown	
28	Matthew Flournoy House		June 23, 1983 (#83002867)	Off Crumbough Pike; 38°11′46″N 84°29′26″W	Centerville	
29	Flournoy-Nutter House		July 28, 1977 (#77000642)	East of Georgetown off KY 922; 38°10′52″N 84°28′44″W	Georgetown	
30	James Gaines House		November 7, 1976 (#76000942)	South of Georgetown on Yarnallton Pike; 38°09′15″N 84°33′58″W	Georgetown	
31	Garth School	Garth School	November 16, 1988 (#88002187)	501 S. Hamilton St. 38°12′21″N 84°33′33″W	Georgetown	
32	John M. Garth House		November 20, 1974 (#74000900)	Southeast of Georgetown off Interstate 75; 38°10′39″N 84°30′16″W	Georgetown	
33	Georgetown College Historic Buildings	Georgetown College Historic Buildings	August 8, 1979 (#79001030)	E. Jackson St. 38°12′25″N 84°33′17″W	Georgetown	
34	Georgetown East Main Street Residential District	Georgetown East Main Street Residential District	June 7, 1978 (#78001396)	Irregular pattern along Main St. between Warrendale Ave. and Mulberry St. 38°12′34″N 84°33′15″W	Georgetown	
35	Giddings Hall, Georgetown College	Giddings Hall, Georgetown College	February 6, 1973 (#73000836)	Giddings Dr. between Jackson and College Sts. 38°12′25″N 84°33′17″W	Georgetown	
36	Griffith House		August 29, 1979 (#79003545)	South of Interstate 64 on Moore's Mill Pike; 38°09′34″N 84°37′43″W	Midway	
37	Halley Place		August 28, 1979 (#79003546)	U.S. Route 62; 38°08′43″N 84°37′04″W	Georgetown	
38	Matthew Henry House		June 23, 1983 (#83002868)	KY 922; 38°12′19″N 84°28′55″W	Centerville	
39	Dr. H. C. Herndon House		April 10, 1980 (#80001666)	West of Georgetown on KY 227; 38°13′04″N 84°36′33″W	Georgetown	
40	Holy Trinity Episcopal Church	Holy Trinity Episcopal Church	October 30, 1973 (#73000837)	S. Broadway and W. Clinton Sts. 38°12′28″N 84°33′38″W	Georgetown	
41	George W. Johnson Slave Quarters and Smokehouse		November 19, 1974 (#74000901)	Southwest of Georgetown off Ironworks Rd. 38°10′25″N 84°36′44″W	Georgetown	
42	James Johnson Quarters		October 11, 1983 (#83003818)	Off KY 227; 38°12′48″N 84°36′50″W	Georgetown	
43	Leonidas Johnson House		October 8, 1976 (#76000943)	7 miles northwest of Georgetown on U.S. Route 227; 38°14′44″N 84°39′35″W	Georgetown	
44	Johnson-Pence House		November 20, 1978 (#78001397)	West of Georgetown off U.S. Route 460; 38°13′23″N 84°37′31″W	Georgetown	
45	Johnston-Jacobs House	Johnston-Jacobs House	October 2, 1973 (#73000838)	205 N. Hamilton St. 38°12′42″N 84°33′30″W	Georgetown	
46	Lane's Run Historic District		January 12, 1984 (#84001986)	Old Oxford Rd., U.S. Routes 62 and 460; 38°13′55″N 84°31′07″W	Georgetown	
47	Leatherer-Lemon House		July 20, 1977 (#77000643)	Lemon's Mill Pike, 0.5 miles west of Newtown Pike; 38°10′56″N 84°29′38″W	Georgetown	
48	James Lindsay–William Trotter House		August 28, 1979 (#79003550)	Payne's Depot Rd (U.S. Route 62); 38°08′15″N 84°37′43″W	Georgetown vic.	Built c.1800 by stonemason and future Kentucky governor Thomas Metcalf.
49	Longview		October 25, 1973 (#73000839)	About 4 miles west of Georgetown off U.S. Route 460; 38°13′10″N 84°39′04″W	Georgetown	
50	Main Street Commercial District	Main Street Commercial District	February 24, 1975 (#75000826)	Both sides of E. Main St. from Mulberry to Broadway, southern side from Elley Alley to Broadway; 38°12′36″N 84°33′29″W	Georgetown	
51	McFarland House	McFarland House	October 15, 1973 (#73000840)	510 Fountain Ave. 38°12′16″N 84°33′00″W	Georgetown	
52	Miller's Run Historic District		November 15, 1978 (#78001398)	Roughly bounded by Old Oxford Pike, KY 922, U.S. Route 460, and Miller's Run; 38°14′14″N 84°29′44″W	Oxford	
53	John Andrew Miller House		November 9, 1977 (#77000644)	3 miles east of Georgetown off U.S. Route 460; 38°13′21″N 84°29′58″W	Georgetown	
54	New Zion Historic District		December 4, 2008 (#08001118)	4972 Newtown Pike through 5200 Newtown Pike, and 103-135 New Zion Rd. 38°10′44″N 84°29′11″W	Scott	African American rural community founded around 1872 on land of two ex slaves. Extends into Fayette County.
55	Lewis Nuckols House	Lewis Nuckols House	August 28, 1979 (#79003547)	U.S. Route 421; 38°07′53″N 84°37′25″W	Georgetown	
56	Osburn House		April 11, 1973 (#73000841)	4 miles north of Georgetown on U.S. Route 25; 38°15′53″N 84°34′02″W	Georgetown	
57	Oxford Historic District		September 11, 1979 (#79001031)	Northeast of Georgetown at U.S. Route 62 and KY 922; 38°16′08″N 84°30′04″W	Georgetown	
58	Joseph Patterson Quarters		June 23, 1983 (#83002869)	Off U.S. Route 421; 38°09′00″N 84°38′20″W	Midway	
59	Asa Payne House		August 28, 1979 (#79003548)	U.S. Route 62; 38°08′46″N 84°37′20″W	Georgetown	
60	Gen. John Payne House		March 3, 1975 (#75000827)	1.5 miles west of Georgetown on U.S. Route 460; 38°12′47″N 84°35′22″W	Georgetown	
61	Payne-Desha House	Payne-Desha House	December 2, 1974 (#74000902)	Kelly Ave. 38°12′45″N 84°33′48″W	Georgetown	
62	Levi Prewitt House		November 1, 1974 (#74000903)	South of Georgetown off Interstate 64; 38°09′01″N 84°34′54″W	Georgetown	
63	Royal Spring Park	Royal Spring Park	April 2, 1973 (#73000842)	Between Clinton and Jefferson Sts., west of Water, Broadway, and Georgetown Sts. 38°12′37″N 84°33′33″W	Georgetown	
64	Sadieville Historic District		July 30, 2013 (#13000566)	100-326 College, 100-245 Main, 350-714 Pike, 216 Church, 204 Cunningham & 100-247 Vine Sts., 109-123 Gano Ave. 38°23′28″N 84°32′11″W	Sadieville	
65	St. Francis Mission at White Sulphur	St. Francis Mission at White Sulphur	April 11, 1973 (#73000847)	7 miles west of Georgetown on U.S. Route 460; 38°12′27″N 84°41′50″W	Georgetown	
66	Robert Sanders House		October 15, 1973 (#73000843)	2 miles south of Georgetown on U.S. Route 25; 38°10′11″N 84°33′29″W	Georgetown	
67	Scott County Courthouse	Scott County Courthouse	September 28, 1972 (#72000542)	E. Main and Broadway; 38°12′36″N 84°33′35″W	Georgetown	
68	Scott County Jail Complex	Scott County Jail Complex	September 6, 2002 (#02000923)	117 N. Water St. 38°12′29″N 84°33′45″W	Georgetown	
69	Showalter House	Showalter House	April 2, 1973 (#73000844)	316 N. Hamilton St. 38°12′47″N 84°33′26″W	Georgetown	
70	Shropshire House	Shropshire House	April 2, 1973 (#73000845)	355 E. Main St. 38°12′36″N 84°33′20″W	Georgetown	
71	Dr. William Addison Smith House		November 29, 1984 (#84000363)	1589 Newton Pike; 38°12′10″N 84°28′53″W	Georgetown	
72	Nelson and Clifton Rodes Smith House		October 3, 1973 (#73000846)	Northeast of Georgetown off Leesburg Pike; 38°14′50″N 84°27′03″W	Georgetown	
73	South Broadway Neighborhood District	South Broadway Neighborhood District	December 19, 1991 (#91001856)	Roughly Georgetown Cemetery, S. Broadway north to College St. and S. Hamilton St. from Clayton Ave. to College St. 38°12′27″N 84°33′36″W	Georgetown	
74	Henry Stevenson House		August 28, 1979 (#79003549)	U.S. Route 62; 38°09′11″N 84°36′42″W	Georgetown	
75	Stone-Grant House		January 11, 1974 (#74000904)	East of Georgetown on E. Main St. extended 38°12′24″N 84°32′38″W	Georgetown	
76	John Suggett House		June 23, 1983 (#83002870)	U.S. Route 460; 38°12′12″N 84°37′09″W	Georgetown	
77	William Suggett Agricultural and Industrial District		November 16, 1988 (#88002182)	Southwest of the junction of Cane Run Rd. and U.S. Route 460; 38°12′18″N 84°36′46″W	Georgetown	
78	Thomsons Mill Warehouse		June 23, 1983 (#83002871)	Off U.S. Route 460; 38°13′06″N 84°34′29″W	Georgetown	
79	Ward Hall	Ward Hall	April 2, 1973 (#85001841)	1.5 miles west of Georgetown on U.S. Route 460; 38°12′23″N 84°35′21″W	Georgetown	
80	Weisenberger Mills and Related Buildings	Weisenberger Mills and Related Buildings	August 16, 1984 (#84001987)	Off U.S. Route 421; 38°07′34″N 84°38′13″W	Midway	Extends into Woodford County
81	West Main Street Historic District	West Main Street Historic District	November 5, 1985 (#85003491)	217-600 W. Main St. 38°12′39″N 84°33′59″W	Georgetown	
82	Charles Whitaker House		June 23, 1983 (#83002872)	Off Old Oxford Rd. 38°14′22″N 84°30′03″W	Georgetown	
83	Merritt Williams House		February 28, 1979 (#79003551)	Moore's Mill Pike at Can Run Pike; 38°09′46″N 84°38′33″W	Midway	

== See also ==
- List of National Historic Landmarks in Kentucky
- National Register of Historic Places listings in Kentucky
