= Abraham Buford =

American Army officer (1747–1833)

- Born: July 21, 1747; Culpeper County, Colony of Virginia
- Died: June 26, 1833 (aged 85); Buford-Duke House, Scott County, Kentucky
- Spouse: Martha
- Children: 5 sons, daughter
- Military career
- Branch: Virginia militia, Continental Army
- Service years: 1775–1782
- Rank: Colonel
- Units: 2nd Virginia Regiment, 5th Virginia Regiment, 11th Virginia Regiment, 14th Virginia Regiment
- Conflicts: American Revolutionary War; Valley Forge; Battle of Monmouth Court House; Battle of Waxhaws

Abraham Buford (July 21, 1747 – June 26, 1833) was a Continental Army officer during the American Revolutionary War, rising to colonel and best known as the commanding officer of the American forces at the disastrous Battle of Waxhaws. After the war Buford became a member of the Society of the Cincinnati of the State of Virginia, and moved to Kentucky, where he became a major landowner and helped found the state's horseracing industry.

== Early and family life ==
Buford was born in Culpeper County, Virginia, a younger son of John Buford (d. 1787) and his wife, the former Judith Early. The Buford family traced its descent from John of Gaunt, a 14th century English prince and military leader who founded the royal House of Lancaster, and whose children by his mistress (later legitimized) took the surname Beaufort (sometimes anglicized as "Buford" including by this man throughout his life) from a castle he conquered in what is today Belgium. Richard Buford or Beaufort emigrated to what became Lancaster County and Middlesex County in the Colony of Virginia in 1635, and descendants slowly moved westward. This man's father (descended from the original Richard's son and grandson both named Thomas) moved to then vast Culpeper County with his Early relatives soon after his marriage to secure a land grant in 1735, and in 1751 bought additional land from Lord Fairfax who owned the Northern Neck Proprietary. The land at the confluence of the Rapidan and Robinson rivers would later be considered Madison County, near Wolftown. By 1770, this man's father was one of Culpeper County's largest landowners, and his eldest son (this man's eldest brother), [John] Thomas Buford, also owned significant land, although other sons had already moved to new frontier in Bedford County. All six sons of John and Judith Early Beaufort (Buford), served with distinction as officers during the American Revolutionary War. When John Buford, who survived the conflict, died in September 1787, this man and his youngest brother were named executors of his estate, and that will also mentioned Simeon's sons, since most of the rest of the family had continued moving west toward Kentucky, where they had secured bounty lands on the basis of their military service.

== Military career ==
Upon the outbreak of the American Revolution in 1775, Abram Buford quickly organized a company of minutemen, and they spent the first winter of the war attached to the 2nd Virginia Regiment defending Norfolk. Buford attained the rank of major of the 14th Virginia Regiment in November 1776, lieutenant colonel of the 5th Virginia Regiment in April 1777 and spent the winter of 1777-1778 at Valley Forge, then fought at Battle of Monmouth Court House on June 28, 1778. He had been promoted to full colonel on May 15, 1778 and was transferred to the 11th Virginia Regiment after that battle, then fought several skirmishes in New Jersey in 1779 before being sent home to recruit more troops. He would be assigned to the ad-hoc 3rd Virginia Detachment in April 1780 and sent south to relieve General Benjamin Lincoln during the British siege of Charleston, South Carolina.

Buford's men were on the north side of the Santee River, unable to help during the Battle of Lenud's Ferry.

Forced to withdraw upon hearing that General Lincoln had surrendered Charleston on May 12, Buford led his troops and wagons northward on muddy roads to escort South Carolina's governor, John Rutledge, to safety in North Carolina. However, the 3rd Virginia Continentals were pursued by a British and American Loyalist force under Lieutenant Colonel Banastre Tarleton, which included at least 270 cavalry (or 700) and mounted infantry. On May 29, the pursuers caught Buford's men, sometimes numbered as 380 infantry troops and a small number of cavalry, at Waxhalls nears the North Carolina border. When Buford first delayed til Rutledge and his wagons were safe, then refused Tarleton's demand to surrender, Tarleton ordered his heavy dragoons to assault the patriot center, while the rest of his cavalry and infantry swept along their flanks. This inflicted casualties so severe that the Americans tried to surrender. Buford raised a white flag and ordered his men to lay down their arms. While Buford was calling for quarter, Tarleton's horse was struck by a musket ball and fell. Either Tarleton deliberately ignored the surrender attempt or Loyalist cavalrymen became enraged that the rebels had shot at their commander while asking for mercy, they attacked the unarmed Americans with sabres and bayonets. Tarleton later described the result as "a vindictive asperity not easily restrained". 113 Americans were killed, 150 wounded and 53 captured. The incident became known as the Waxhaw Massacre, and became strong propaganda story in the southern states as well as later battles. From that time onward, "Tarleton's Quarter" (meaning give no quarter) was an American battle cry in the Southern theater.

Escaping on horseback with his remaining men, Buford was eventually not found culpable for the defeat, and continued to serve as an officer in the Continental Army through the Siege of Yorktown.

== Kentucky planter ==
Buford received more than 8000 acres of land as a bounty for his military service, and also acted as a surveyor, which enabled him to pick out choice locations, so that by his death he owned 50,000 acres. By January 1783 Buford had moved to Lincoln County in what soon would become the state of Kentucky. He eventually settled near Georgetown in the new state's Bluegrass region, where he helped found that state's horseracing industry by importing prime stock from Virginia. Buford farmed using enslaved labor. Although, it is unclear whether he owned two tithable enslaved people in what was then called Mercer County in 1787, Buford enslaved 37 people by the federal census in 1810. In 1792 Buford built a house in Scott County, Kentucky which he called "Richland". That building, now known as the Buford-Duke House, is now listed on the National Register of Historic Places.

== Personal life ==
Buford married Martha McDowell, whose father Samuel McDowell had also served in the Virginia Line of the Continental Army, after leading militiamen from Augusta County, Virginia (which he later represented in the legislature) before moving to Fayette County, then Mercer County, Kentucky, where he became a judge. Her brothers Major John McDowell and Col. James McDowell also fought for the new nation, and her brother William McDowell (b.1762) married a niece of the future President Madison and later became a Kentucky judge. Abraham and Martha Buford had five sons and two daughters. The eldest, Charles Buford (d. 1866), attended Yale and farmed near his father in Kentucky before moving to Illinois and becoming wealthy. Henry Buford moved to Fayette County, Kentucky and died in 1848, but his son Henry M. Buford would become a Kentucky judge. Martha (Pattie) Buford married James Jackson who became a Congressman from Christian County, Kentucky despite his emancipationist views, and fought with the Third Kentucky Cavalry under Gen. Buell during the Civil War. William McDowell Buford, a staunch Unionist who accepted the emancipation of his slaves, also survived the Civil War and died in Woodford County, Kentucky. His younger sister Mary Buford married James Duke, who died in 1863, although she survived until 1891.

== Legacy ==
Buford died at his Kentucky home between June 26 and 30, 1833, during a cholera epidemic. Civil War Buford family descendants included Union Major Generals John Buford (who distinguished himself at the Battle of Gettysburg) and Napoleon Bonaparte Buford and Confederate General Abraham Buford.

On Flag Day, June 14, 2006, descendants of Lieutenant Colonel Banastre Tarleton sold Colonel Buford's regimental flags, taken at the Waxhaw Massacre, at Sotheby's New York for over $5,000,000 (US).
