= First African Baptist Church =

First African Baptist Church may refer to:

- First African Baptist Church (Tuscaloosa, Alabama)*
- First African Missionary Baptist Church (Bainbridge, Georgia)*
- First African Baptist Church (Columbus, Georgia)*
- First African Baptist Church Parsonage (Columbus, Georgia)*
- First African Baptist Church at Raccoon Bluff, Hog Hammock, Georgia*
- First African Baptist Church (Savannah, Georgia)
- First African Baptist Church and Parsonage (Waycross, Georgia)*
- First African Baptist Church (Lexington, Kentucky)*
- First African Baptist Church and Parsonage (Scott County, Kentucky), Georgetown, Kentucky*
- African Meeting House, Boston, Massachusetts, also known as First African Baptist Church*
- First African Baptist Church (St. Louis, Missouri)
- First African Baptist Church (Philadelphia, Pennsylvania)
- Mount Zion First African Baptist Church (Charlottesville, Virginia)
- First African Baptist Church (Richmond, Virginia)*

* Listed on the National Register of Historic Places
