= Elkwood =

Elkwood may refer to a location in the United States:

- Elkwood (Georgetown, Kentucky), listed on the National Register of Historic Places (NRHP) in Kentucky
- Elkwood (Midway, Kentucky), listed on the NRHP in Kentucky
- Elkwood, Virginia, unincorporated community
