= Georgetown College Historic Buildings =

Historic district in Kentucky, United States

- U.S. National Register of Historic Places
- U.S. Historic district
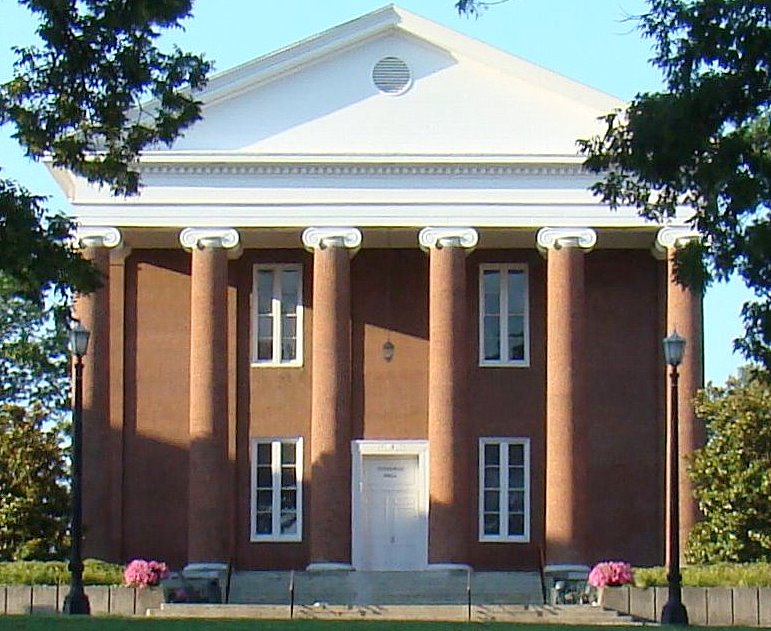
- Giddings Hall

- Location within Kentucky Location within the United States
- Location: Georgetown, Kentucky
- Coordinates: 38°12′25″N 84°33′17″W
- Built: 1844
- Architectural style: Italianate
- NRHP reference No.: 79001030
- Added to NRHP: August 8, 1979

Georgetown College Historic Buildings are a group of historically significant building located on the campus of Georgetown College in Scott County, Kentucky. The structures were added to the U.S. National Register of Historic Places in 1979.

== Antebellum buildings ==
Georgetown College campus has three antebellum buildings: Giddings Hall, Pawling Hall, and Highbaugh Hall.

=== Giddings Hall ===
Recitation Hall, now known as Giddings Hall, is a Greek Revival building located on at center of the campus. Giddings Hall was the first permanent structure constructed after the college was formed.

Currently, the building is used as the main administrative building for the campus. In the past, rooms in the building have been used as a chapel, a library, classrooms, and a theater.

=== Highbaugh Hall ===
The Academy Building, now known as Highbaugh Hall, was second permanent building constructed on campus.

The literary societies used Highbaugh Hall to host their debates and for their resource library. The building entrances on the east and west have concrete plaques with the names and founding dates of the literary societies.
