= Great Crossing High School =

Coordinates: 38°12′56″N 84°35′59″W

Location
- 120 Betsy Way; Georgetown, KY 40324

Information
- School type: Public
- Founded: 2019
- School district: Scott County Schools
- Principal: Jenna Landacre
- Staff: 83.49 (FTE)
- Grades: 9–12
- Enrollment: 1,700 (2023-2024)
- Student to teacher ratio: 20.36
- Campus: Suburban
- Colors: Kelly green and navy
- Nickname: Warhawks
- Feeder schools: Georgetown Middle School; Scott County Middle School (Note: While the Scott County district has three middle schools, only two feed students to Great Crossing High. Scott County Schools determines districting for its middle and high schools by elementary school attendance zones. All three elementary schools that feed Georgetown Middle School, plus two of the three elementary schools that feed Scott County Middle School, feed students to Great Crossing High. None of the elementary schools that feed Royal Spring Middle School feed Great Crossing High.)
- Website: https://greatcrossing.scott.kyschools.us/

Great Crossing High School is a public high school in Georgetown, Kentucky, United States that opened in August 2019. It is operated by Scott County Schools (SCS), which oversees all public K–12 education in Scott County, Kentucky.

The school bears the name of the former Great Crossing School, which opened in 1939 and was in turn named for one of the Georgetown area's first settlements, established at a buffalo crossing of Elkhorn Creek. The original Great Crossing School housed a high school program until the county's high schools were consolidated into Scott County High School, also in Georgetown, in 1955. The building continued to serve as a school until Western Elementary School opened in 1993, and now houses the SCS central office.

SCS had planned to build a new high school in the 1990s, but never followed through on those plans until the last half of the 2010s. By that time, overcrowding at Scott County High, the only public high school in the county, had reached crisis proportions. During the last half of the 2010s, Scott County was the fastest-growing county in Kentucky, and was projected to have more than 3,000 high school students by the 2020–21 school year. With this in mind, the school district approved construction of the new school, breaking ground in 2017. It is located about 1 mile (1.6 km) away from Scott County High and also adjacent to Elkhorn Crossing School, previously a detached campus of Scott County High.

The school cost about $90 million, and opened before it was 100% complete; the only parts yet to be completed were a welding classroom and a performing arts auditorium. Construction was plagued by unusually wet weather, with 247 rain days during the project.

The new school was built with space for over 1,900 students, but opened with about 1,450. Initially, SCS announced that all rising juniors and seniors for 2019–20 at Scott County High could remain at that school if they wished. Additionally, any siblings of these students who were set to attend an SCS high school would also be allowed to attend Scott County High. SCS later changed the plan to allow all students who were set to attend high school in the district to choose which school they would attend, and about 55% chose Great Crossing.
