= Scott County High School =

Public school in Georgetown, Kentucky

Coordinates: 38°13′58″N 84°34′24″W

Location
- 1051 McClelland Cir; Georgetown, KY 40324

Information
- School type: Public
- Founded: 1955 (current buildings: 1996)
- School district: Scott County Schools
- Principal: Joe Matthews
- Grades: 9–12
- Enrollment: 1,353 (2023–2024)
- Campus: Exurban
- Colors: Red. blue and white
- Mascot: Cardinal
- Nickname: Cardinals
- Feeder schools: Royal Spring Middle School; Scott County Middle School (Note: While the Scott County district has three middle schools, only two now feed students to Scott County High. From 2019–20 forward, Scott County Schools determines districting for its middle and high schools by elementary school attendance zones. All three elementary schools that feed Royal Spring Middle School, plus one of the three elementary schools that feed Scott County Middle School, will feed students to Scott County High. Georgetown Middle School will exclusively feed the new Great Crossing High School.)
- Website: https://scotthigh.scott.kyschools.us/

Scott County High School is a public high school in Georgetown, Kentucky, United States. The mascot is a Cardinal. School colors are Red and Blue, with white and black occasionally serving as secondary colors. In the 2018–19 school year, its last as the county's only public high school, the combined institution had an enrollment of 2,486, making it the largest high school in the state, before rival school Great Crossing High School opened across town just in time for the 2019–2020 school year. The 9th Grade Center, a section of the building where all of the 9th grade classes were located, along with a separate library, cafeteria, and gym, was replaced by the new "Phoenix Horizon" (formerly called Cardinal Academy when the section of the school was the 9th Grade Center) a program where kids who were struggling in normal classes, or having behavior issues could go and learn without the distractions of a normal classroom.

== History ==
With Scott County being the fastest-growing in the state during the last half of the 2010s, and with more than 3,000 high school students expected by the 2020–21 school year, the county school district began construction on the new Great Crossing High School next to the ECS campus in 2017. The new school opened for the 2019–20 school year with space for over 1,900 students. Initially, rising juniors and seniors for 2019–20, plus any of their siblings who were set to attend a Scott County high school in that school year, would have been allowed to remain at Scott County High if they wished. (Note: The breakdown of Scott County High's 2018–19 enrollment by grade lends credence to predictions of over 3,000 total high school students in 2020–21. The sophomore and freshman classes—the vast majority of which would presumably remain enrolled in the Scott County district in 2020–21—respectively had 616 and 746 students.) The district later changed its plans, allowing all students who were set to attend a district high school to choose their school; about 55% chose to attend Great Crossing. Before the plans of opening a new high school, Scott County was going to be renovated to repair parts of the school, and extend it to occupy more students. However, these plans were scrapped and instead a new high school was built.

== Athletics ==
- Basketball (separate boys and girls)
- Cheerleading squad
- Cross country team (separate boys and girls)
- Football (boys only)
- Golf (separate boys and girls)
- Soccer (separate boys and girls)
- Softball (girls only)
- Tennis (separate boys and girls)
- Track (separate boys and girls)
- Trap Shooting (co-ed)
- Volleyball (girls only)
- Swimming (co-ed)
- Dance Team (girls only)
- Baseball (boys only)
- Lacrosse (separate boys and girls)
- Wrestling
- Bowling (boys and girls)
- Archery (co-ed)
- E-Sports

=== Athletic accomplishments ===
-Powerlifting

- 1999 Kentucky State Champions

-Basketball

- 2007 Kentucky Boys State Champion

(30–0 against in state teams) (4–2 against out of state teams) (Defeated #1 ranked Huntington High School)

- 2007 Ranked 15th in the nation in the final USA Today Polls
- 1998 Kentucky Boys State Champion
- 1995 Kentucky Girls State Champion

-Football

- 2013 Kentucky 6A State Champions 15–0
- 2010 Regional Champions
- 2009 Regional Champions
- 2006 JV Pride Champions 10–0
- 2006 Kentucky Freshman Bluegrass Champions 9–0
- 1975 Kentucky 2A State Champions

-Boys Soccer

- 2006 District Champions
- 2005 Regional Champions
- 2006 Regional Champions
- 2008 Regional Champions

-Boys Tennis

- 1987 Regional Champions
- 1999 Regional Champions
- 1997 Regional Champions

-Boys Bowling

- 2012 Regional Champions
- 2012 State Champions
- 2013 Regional Champions

-Girls Softball

- 2007 Regional Champs
- 2008 Regional Champs
- 2010 Regional Champs
- 2011 District Champs
- 2012 District Champs
- 2013 District Champs
- 2012 Regional Champs
- 2013 Regional Champs
- 2014 Regional Champs
- 2014 State Champs
- 2015 Regional Champs
- 2016 State Champs
- 2018 Regional Champs
- 2018 State Champs

-Archery

- 2016 World Championship Qualifiers
- 2017 World Championship Qualifiers

== Academics ==
Scott County High School has the following academic departments:

- Agriculture
- Art
- Band
- Business
- Choir
- Civil Law
- Criminal Law
- Language Arts
- Family and Consumer Science
- Foreign Language Classes
- Law and Justice
- Health and Physical Education
- Health Services
- Math
- Industrial Technology
- Science
- Social Studies
- Special Education
- Journalism/School Newspaper
- Engineering
- Biomedical Science

Scott County High School offers a number of AP classes:

- English Literature
- English Language
- United States History
- World History
- Human Geography
- Psychology
- Biology
- Calculus (AB and BC)
- French Language
- Japanese Language
- Spanish Language
- Art
- Environmental Science
- Chemistry
- Statistics
- Physics B

There are also Dual Credit classes that are available to take, and Co-OP opportunities.

Starting in 2023–24, Scott County High School moved to a modified block schedule for all classes held in the building. SCHS's schedule has 4 classes meeting on "RED" days and then 4 different classes meeting on "BLUE" days for a total of 8 possible credits earned. On Fridays all classes will meet during the school day as well as include a 30-minute advisory session.

Students enrolled at Elkhorn Crossing School or "ECS" attend either a morning or afternoon session. ECS students have the ability to earn three, four, or even more credits during their time at ECS depending upon whether early morning and dual credit options are pursued.

Students are required to have 4 Math and Language Arts credits, 3 Science and Social Studies credits, at least 1 Art credit (classes like Art, Band and Choir give Art credits), and at least 1 Health credit and at least 1 Physical Education class (there are classes available to earn these credits, ranging from Strength and Conditioning to Weight Lifting).

== Music ==
=== Band ===
The band director is Lindsay King. Former band directors include Greg Stepp.

- Symphonic Winds (top concert band)
- Concert Winds
- Beginning Band
- Intro to Band
- Jazz Band I
- Jazz Band II
- Marching Band (all band members participate, but it is not a competing band)
- Red Pep Band
- Blue Pep Band

Each year the Band performs at Assessment, parades, Football and Basket Ball games, and has concerts. Students each year audition and are accepted into various Honor Bands, and KMEA Allstate.

In April 2007, the Symphonic Winds performed at Carnegie Hall in New York City. In 2007, Scott County High School Band was named the largest high school or college band in Kentucky. In May 2009, the Band when to Atlanta, Georgia to compete in the Dixie Classic Festival where they ranked Distinguished on a National level. In February 2010, The Symphonic Winds 4th hour band played at the KMEA yearly convention in Louisville, Kentucky. In April 2010, the band went to the Dixie Classic Festival in Chicago, the Symphonic Winds being named Honor Band. The Symphonic Winds 4th hour band was invited to play in the Chicago Midwest Clinic Festival in 2010.

=== Choral ===
The choral department.

- Singers (choral ensemble)
- Chorus (bottom coed choral ensemble)
- Mastersingers (top men's ensemble)
- Ladies' Ensemble (top women's ensemble)
- Chamber Singers

The choir has concerts each year, along with performing in various parades, and graduation. Students participate in the Musical Productions the school puts on every year. Each year students in the choir audition and are accepted in choirs such as KMEA Allstate, ACDA, and other programs.

== Notable alumna ==
- Stacy McIntyre Women's basketball coach [[United States
- Ukari Figgs 1995 Kentucky Miss Basketball, 1995 state championship. Purdue national championship, Los Angeles Sparks national championship

Air Force Academy]]

- A.W. Hamilton Men's basketball coach Eastern Kentucky University

== Other accomplishments ==
=== Kentucky United Nations Assembly ===
2018-

- Outstanding Resolution Award- #51 Ethiopia- Amending the Universal Declaration of Human Rights to add Article 31 "The Right to Refuse to Kill"
- Outstanding Resolution Award- #53 Guatemala- Convention to Build Communal Compost Toilets And Educating Proper Hygiene
- Endorsed by Secretary General- #52 Fiji- Instituting Protections for Climate Refugees
- Endorsed by Secretary General- #54 Nigeria- An Act to Establish Protections Against Extraterrestrial Beings
- Outstanding Speaker Award-
- Outstanding Ambassador Award-
- Summit Chairs-

HOSA State Leadership Conference:

1st Place, Creative Problem Solving

=== HOSA National Leadership Conference ===
2005-

- 1st Place, Extemporaneous Writing

=== STLP (Student Technology Leadership Program) ===
2003- State Recognition, Regional Blue Ribbon - High School Virtual Tour

2004- State Recognition, Regional Blue Ribbon - High School Virtual Tour
