= Scott County Courthouse =

Scott County Courthouse may refer to:

- Scott County Courthouse (Arkansas), Waldron, Arkansas
- Scott County Courthouse (Iowa), Davenport, Iowa
- Scott County Courthouse (Kansas), Scott City, Kansas
- Scott County Courthouse (Kentucky), Georgetown, Kentucky
- Scott County Courthouse (Missouri), Benton, Missouri
