= Scott County Jail =

Scott County Jail may refer to:

- Scott County Jail (Iowa) in Davenport
- Scott County Jail Complex in Georgetown, Kentucky
