= Robert H. Brooks (soldier) =

United States Army soldier

- Born: Robert Harold Brooks; October 8, 1915; Sadieville, Kentucky, U.S.
- Died: December 8, 1941 (aged 26); Clark Field, Philippines
- Burial place: Manila American Cemetery
- Military career
- Allegiance: United States
- Branch: US Army
- Service years: –1941
- Rank: Private first class (posthumous)
- Unit: 192nd Tank Battalion
- Conflicts: World War II †
- Awards: Purple Heart

Robert Harold Brooks (October 8, 1915 – December 8, 1941) was a United States Army soldier. He was the first Army Armored Branch casualty of World War II, being killed on the island of Luzon within hours of the Japanese surprise attack against the United States.

== Biography ==
Brooks was born in Sadieville, Kentucky on October 8, 1915, to a family of African-American sharecroppers. (Note: Several sources state that Brooks was born in Sadieville. However, WTVQ-DT says that he was born in MacFarland and grew up in Sadieville.) He worked as a sales clerk in adulthood, moving to Hamilton, Ohio. In the early 1940s, Brooks joined the army from Hamilton as a private. (Note: Sources differ as to when and how Brooks joined the army. The Kentucky African American Encyclopedia says that he enlisted on March 15, 1941, while WTVQ-DT and The Advocate-Messenger write that he was drafted or enlisted in 1940.) He was trained at Fort Knox and qualified as a half-track and tank driver, but was assigned to maintenance following specialized instruction. As a light-skinned Black man, he was officially classified as White, allowing him to join the all-White D Company, 192nd Tank Battalion, known as the Harrodsburg Tankers after the Kentucky town they were stationed in as a National Guard unit. After basic training, the unit conducted exercises at Camp Polk in Louisiana. They traveled through San Francisco and Honolulu to the Philippines, arriving in December 1941.

On December 8, 1941, at 12:45 p.m., Brooks's unit was stationed at Clark Field on Luzon. Most of the soldiers were at lunch, although Brooks and other mechanics were working. At that time, Japanese aircraft began strafing and bombing the airfield. Other soldiers saw Brooks running towards his half-track, apparently to use its .50-caliber machine gun to shoot at the planes. A bomb struck nearby, killing him instantly.

== Aftermath ==
When Fort Knox's commander, Major General Jacob L. Devers, learned of Brooks's death, he decided to name the fort's main parade ground after Brooks. When an aide informed Devers that Brooks was African-American, the first time that the army had learned his racial identity, Devers replied, "It did not matter whether or not Robert was black, what mattered was that he had given his life for his country." On December 23, 1941, six generals and eighty other officers, along with Brooks's parents, commemorated him during the naming ceremony. Prayers were offered, and "Taps" was played.

In 1942, a Central High School teacher wrote a song memorializing Brooks. It was published by W. C. Handy Brothers Music Company.

After the war, Brooks's remains were moved to the Manila American Cemetery, where they were re-interred. He was posthumously promoted to private first class and awarded the Purple Heart. He is honored in his hometown, Sadieville, with a historical marker.
