= Sallie Rochester Ford =

American denominational writer and newspaper editor

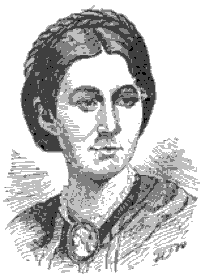
- Born: Sallie Rochester; October 1, 1828; Boyle County, Kentucky, U.S.
- Died: February 18, 1910 (aged 81); St. Louis, Missouri, U.S.
- Education: Georgetown Female Seminary
- Occupations: denominational writer; newspaper editor
- Spouse: Samuel Howard Ford (m. 1855)

Sallie Rochester Ford (née, Rochester; October 1, 1828 – February 18, 1910) was an American denominational writer and newspaper editor of the long nineteenth century. She was the author of, Grace Truman, Mary Bunyan, Evangel Wiseman, Ernest Quest, The Inebriates; Raids and Romance of Morgan and His Men, and The Life of Rochester Ford. She assisted her husband in the editing and publishing of the Christian Repository, a Baptist monthly for almost half a century. Ford was a leading author of the Baptist denomination, and a subtle and effective interpreter of its tenets.

== Early life and education ==
Sallie Rochester was born at Rochester Springs (or Spring), Boyle County, Kentucky, (Note: According to Gould (1890), Rochester Spring was located 12 miles (19 km) from Harrodville, Boyle County, Kentucky.) October 1, 1828. She was a daughter of Col. James Henry and Demoretta (Pitts) Rochester; granddaughter of Col. John and Sallie Underwood (Lewis) Rochester of Danville, Kentucky, and a descendant of Nicholas Rochester, who emigrated from Kent County, England, to Westmoreland County, Virginia, in 1687. Ford's father was the grandnephew of Nathaniel Rochester, who laid out the city of Rochester, New York. The Rochesters of England date back to the time of Bede the Venerable, when the name was "Hoefcaster".

Ford was the eldest of three daughters. Her mother, Demoretta, died when Ford was four years old, at which time, her maternal grandmother devoted herself to her grandchildren. Accustomed herself to out-door exercise, the management of a farm, and the superintendence of a large family, and being withal a woman of highly religious character, the grandmother appreciated and enforced the kind of training which later became exhibiting characteristics of Ford.

Ford, with her sister Cassandra, was educated at Georgetown Female Seminary, Kentucky, an institution, under the conduct of Prof. Jonathan Everett Farnam. From the first, she gave evidence of talent, and, in 1847, graduated with the highest honors of her class.

In the spring of 1848, she made a public profession of the Christian religion, and was baptized by the Rev. D. R. Campbell, President of Georgetown College Kentucky. Her advantages for acquiring biblical knowledge were described by him as being rather unusual. She was a lover of books and a close student. Her uncle, Rev. J. R. Pitts, occupied an adjacent farm, and gave her free access to his library and counsel. She cultivated the acquaintance of clergymen, especially those of her own denomination, and took an intelligent and deep interest in the study of the distinguishing principles of their theology. In this way, she laid the foundation of the skill with which she has later defended the faith of her people.

== Career ==
On March 7, 1855, she married the Reverend Samuel Howard Ford, D.D., LL.D., of Louisville, Kentucky. He was at that time pastor of the East Baptist church in that city, and connected with the denominational press of the State.

Shortly after their marriage, he became sole proprietor of the Christian Repository, a religious monthly, which he conducted with success until the start of the civil war. At this point commenced Mrs. Ford's career as a writer. She contributed short articles to the Repository until she acquired ease and confidence, then, encouraged by her husband, began the serial of "Grace Truman", which was brought out in the monthly numbers of that magazine. This story at once attracted the attention of the public. The Repository, rose rapidly, and Mrs. Ford's reputation as a denominational writer was gradually established.

Grace Truman; or, Love and Principle was published in book form in 1857, by Sheldon & Co., of New York City, and was dedicated to, "Elizabeth T. Pitts, my loved and venerated grandmother, who, beneath the weight of eighty years, still cherishes, with clear conception and unabated zeal, those principles which, in orphan childhood, I learned from her lips". In a short time, it reached a sale of 30,000 copies. As a lucid and forcible presentation of distinctive tenets, it held an important place in religious literature of that day.

In 1860, through the same publishers, appeared Ford's second book, Mary Bunyan, the Dreamer’s Blind Daughter, A Tale of Religious Persecution. In this volume she traces, with graphic power, the persecution and intolerance by which the author of Pilgrim's Progress was prepared for his immortal work. Said the New York Evangelist:— "The simple incidents of Bunyan’s life, his protracted imprisonment, his heroic endurance and lofty faith, are of themselves full of the deepest and most thrilling interest. It needed only the picture of his blind daughter, Mary, in her gentleness and patience under sore misfortune, to give completeness to the tragic yet noble scenes in which Bunyan figures, so modestly yet grandly conspicuous. The author of the volume before us has carefully gathered up such historical facts— and they are, fortunately, numerous and well authenticated—as could throw light upon her subject, and has employed them with great sagacity and effect in the construction of her story." Godey's Magazine (1860) also reviewed the book, stating:– "This tale is laid in England, in the seventeenth century, and John Bunyan is introduced as one of the principal characters. Though somewhat religious in its tone, it has sufficient romance and intrigue in it to be entitled to the name of novel."

During the war, Ford was a refugee in Dixie, doing her utmost for the soldiers of the Confederate States Army. For some time, in the later part of the war, Rev. Ford was stationed in Mobile, Alabama, The Raids and Romance of Morgan and his Men, which appeared serially in a weekly paper, was published by S. H. Goetzel, Mobile, on dingy paper, with wall paper covers, and had a large sale, and was read and reread by campfires and in bivouacs.

After the war, Ford resided in Memphis, Tennessee where her husband edited the Southern Repository, a monthly journal. In 1900, she was still conducting the family department of the Repository and Home Circle.

Ford served as president of the Woman's Missionary Society of the West in Missouri for some years, and also of the Missionary Society of the South.

== Personal life ==
Her husband, Rev. Ford, was born in Missouri, in 1823, and was educated in the University of Missouri. He held pastorates in Memphis, Tennessee, Mobile, Alabama, and St. Louis. His books were: The Origin of the Baptists and Servetus, both published in Memphis; A Brief Baptist History (St. Louis: 1886); A Complete Ecclesiastical History (St. Louis: 1889); The Great Pyramids of Egypt (St. Louis: 1882); and What Baptists Baptize For (St. Louis: 1887). He died a few years before his wife. There were five children born of this marriage, two of whom died young.

From 1871 till her death, Ford was a resident of St. Louis, Missouri. She died in that city on February 18, 1910.

== Selected works ==
- The battle of freedom: including seven letters on religious liberty, addressed to Bishop Spalding (1855)
- Grace Truman, or, Love and principle (New York City: 1867)
- Mary Bunyan, the dreamer's blind daughter : a tale of religious persecution (New York: 1859)
- Evangel Wiseman, or, The mother's question (Philadelphia: 1887)
- Ernest Quest, or, The search for truth (New York: 1878)
- The Inebriates (St. Louis: 1880)
- Raids and Romance of Morgan and His Men (Mobile, Alabama: 1863)
- Rochester Ford : the story of a successful Christian lawyer (St. Louis: 1908)
