= Hawkins House (Scott County, Kentucky) =

Historic house in Kentucky, United States

- Cantrill House
- U.S. National Register of Historic Places
- U.S. Historic district – Contributing property
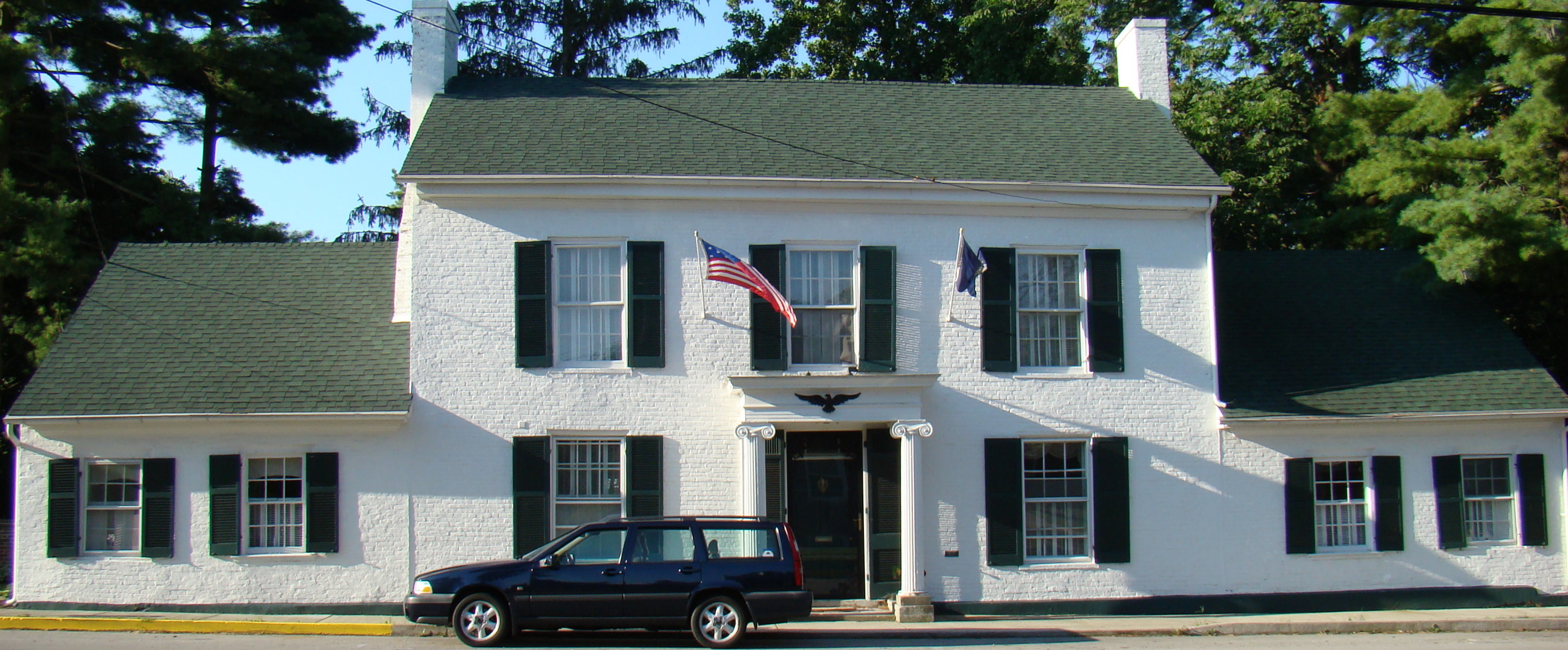

- Location within Kentucky Location within the United States
- Location: Georgetown, Kentucky
- Coordinates: 38°12′23″N 84°33′22″W
- Part of: South Broadway Neighborhood District (ID91001856)
- NRHP reference No.: 73000834

Significant dates
- Added to NRHP: April 2, 1973
- Designated CP: December 19, 1991

The Hawkins House, also known as the Cantrill House, is a historic building on East Jackson Street in Georgetown, Kentucky. The structure has been used as a ropewalk, a dormitory for women at Georgetown Female Seminary, and a residential dwelling. During the past 180 years, Georgetown College has bought and sold the property three times. The property was added to the U.S. National Register of Historic Places on April 2, 1973.

== History ==
In 1784, Elijah Craig established the town of Lebanon, Virginia in an area of Kentucky now known as Scott County. As a tribute to the first President of the United States, George Washington, the name was changed to George Town in 1790, and later shortened to Georgetown. The town was centered around Royal Spring, a large spring that was a reliable source of water for the residents and industry in the area. Hemp was one of earliest successful industries in Georgetown. In 1789, Craig founded one of the earliest successful ropewalks in Kentucky.

=== Ropewalk and bagging factory ===
Early property records show that the land where the Hawkins House sits belonged to the Hawkins family and was referred to as "ropewalk alley". Taking full advantage of the plentiful hemp crops in Scott County, Thomas Hawkins established a ropewalk and bagging factory on the property. Land deeds show that the property continued to be used as a hemp establishment as late as the 1850s.

=== Georgetown College ===
Georgetown College bought and sold the building three times. First, in August 1830, after the decision was made to establish a Baptist college in Georgetown, the building was the first property bought by the new institution. After other land was secured for the new school, the property was sold to Joseph Lemon who returned the building to its prior use as a ropewalk and bagging factory. Georgetown College acquired the property for the second time in 1853 from E.N. Eliot. The school held the property until 1858 and used it first as the college president's house and then later as a men's dormitory called Judson Hall. The college bought the house for the last time in 1930 from W.E. Haynes and his wife Frances (Wood) and sold it the next year to Mary Garth Hawkins.

=== Residential dwelling ===
After being used for commercial purposes in the early years, during later years the Hawkins House was used as a residential dwelling for many well known Scott County families. In 1858, J.J. Rucker, a professor of mathematics, purchased the property for use as a home. Dr. J. Campbell Cantrill and his wife resided in the house.

=== Georgetown Female Seminary ===
When Georgetown Female Seminary building burned beyond use, J.J. Rucker used his home, the Hawkins House, to house the women. Sallie Rochester Ford, a graduate of the seminary, became a writer and newspaper editor.

== Architecture ==
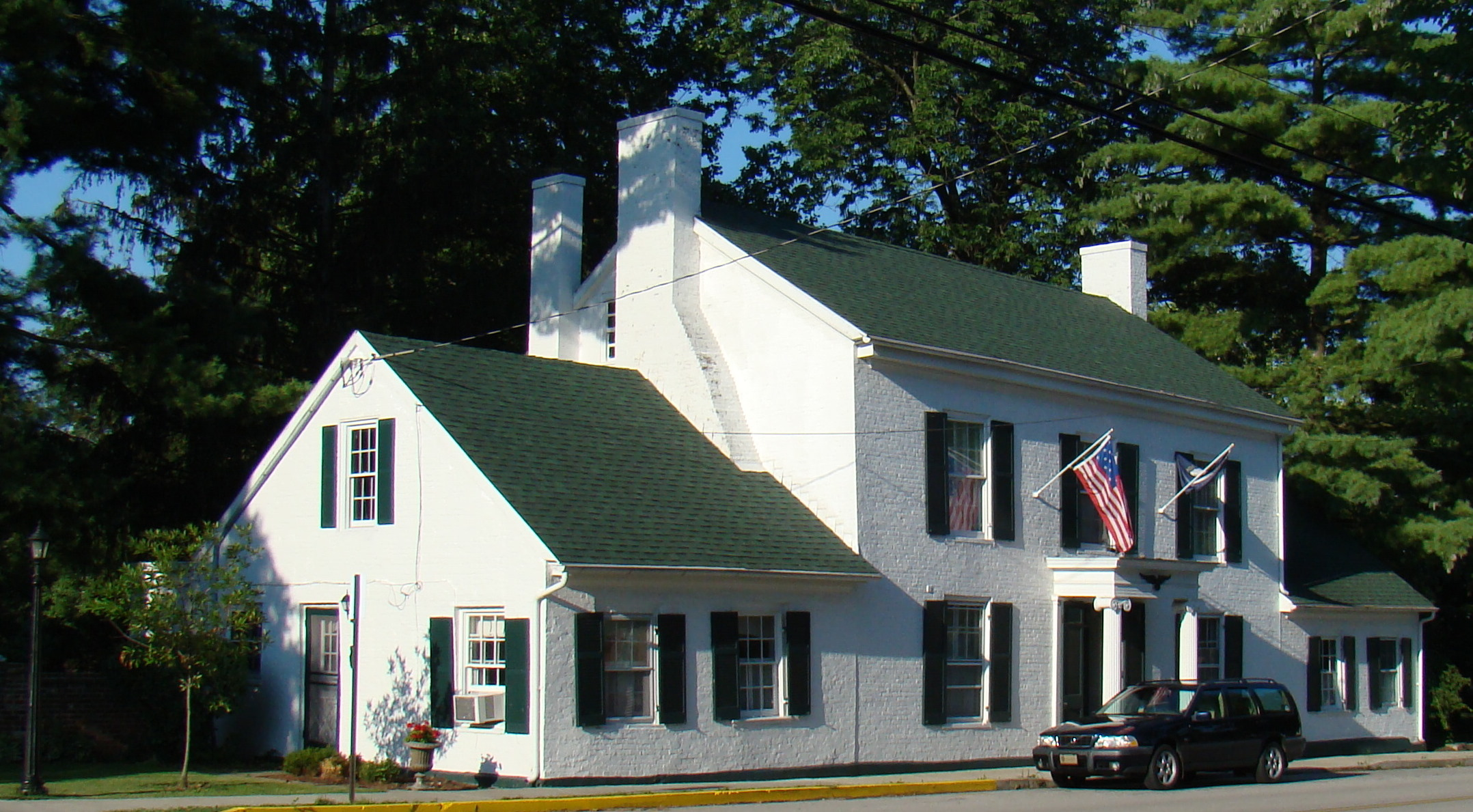
The sections of Hawkins House were built during three time periods. The area on the right is the oldest.

The Hawkins House has a central section with two-bay wings attached on both sides to central area.

The oldest section of the Hawkins House is the west wing of the structure, and includes six-panel doors and a simple fireplace mantel indicating a construction date as early as 1790. This part of the building has a freestanding chimney and staircase that are independent from the rest of the structure. The east wing of the house has reeded recesses, and reeding on the chair rail and mantels indicating a later construction date.
