= South Broadway Neighborhood District =

Historic district in Kentucky, United States

- U.S. National Register of Historic Places
- U.S. Historic district
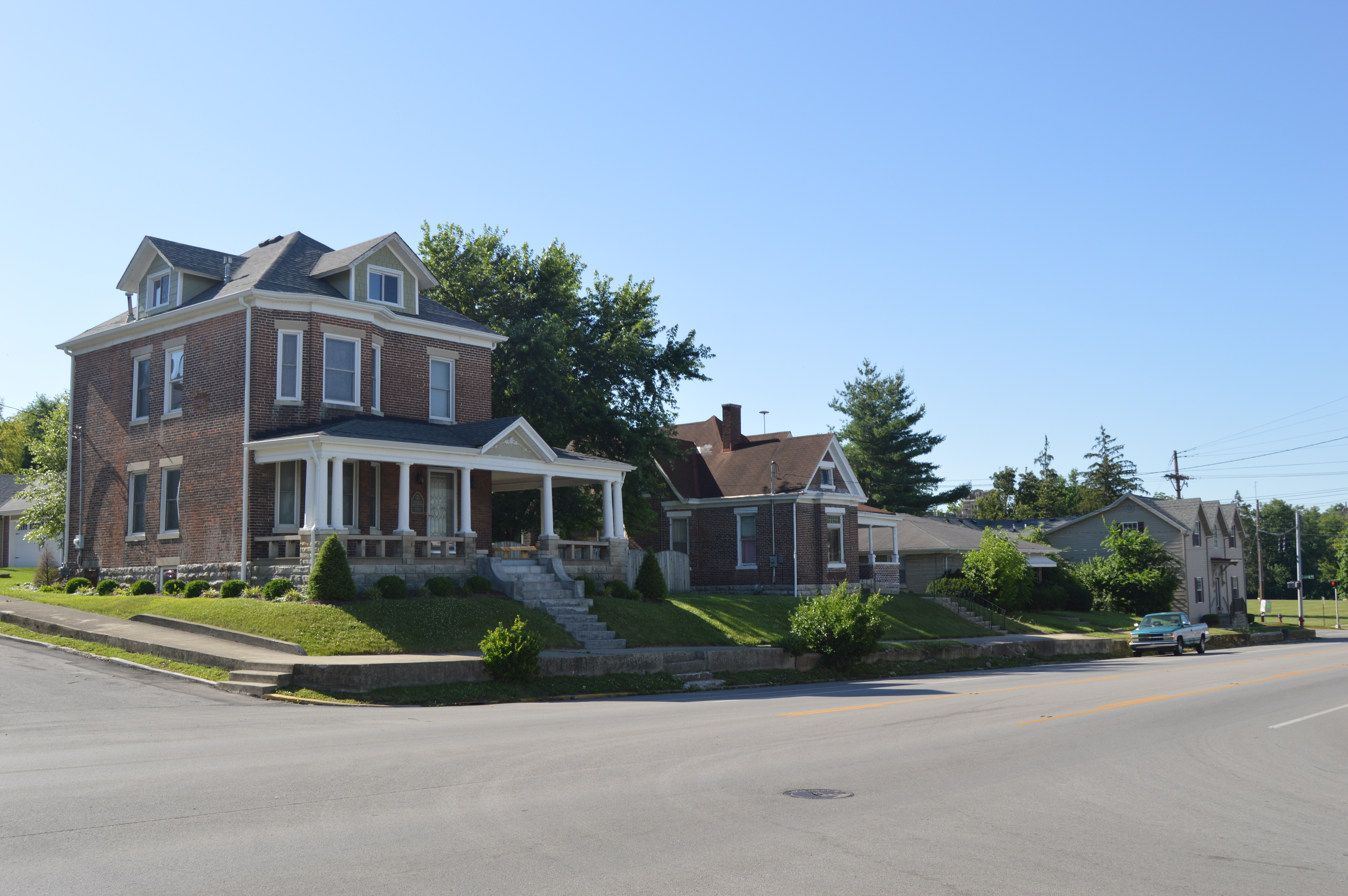
- Broadway south of Clinton

- Location within Kentucky Location within the United States
- Location: Georgetown, Kentucky
- Coordinates: 38°12′9″N 84°33′38″W
- Area: 93.4 acres (37.8 ha)
- Built: 1786
- Built by: G.H. Nunnelly Lumber Co.
- Architect: Frankel & Curtis
- Architectural style: Colonial Revival, Italianate, Federal
- NRHP reference No.: 91001856
- Added to NRHP: December 19, 1991

The South Broadway Neighborhood District is a historic residential area and historic district located near downtown Georgetown, Kentucky. The neighborhood was added to the U.S. National Register of Historic Places in 1991.

It is 93.4 acres (37.8 ha) in size. It includes the 149 contributing buildings, 67 contributing structures, and a contributing site. It includes four separately NRHP-listed properties: Holy Trinity Episcopal Church, Branham House, Cantrill House, and Garth School.
