= Scott County Jail Complex =

- U.S. National Register of Historic Places
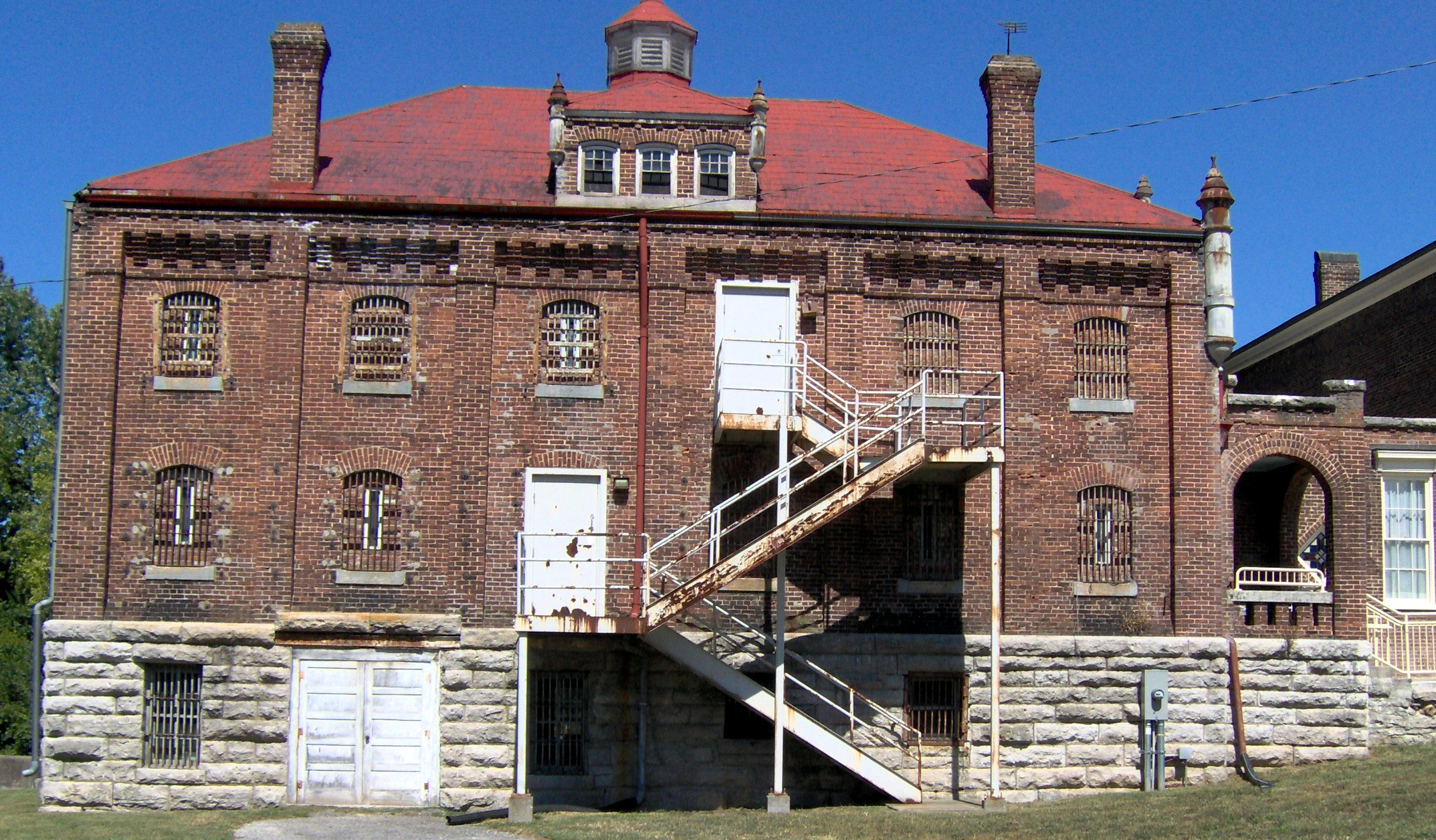
- Part of the Scott County Jail Complex

- Location within Kentucky Location within the United States
- Location: 117 N. Water St., Georgetown, Kentucky
- Coordinates: 38°12′38.34″N 84°33′41.51″W
- Built: 1892
- Architect: J.W. Lucas, J. T. Brooks
- Architectural style: Italianate, Romanesque
- NRHP reference No.: 02000923
- Added to NRHP: September 6, 2002

Scott County Jail Complex located in Georgetown, Kentucky served as the Scott County jail from 1892 until 1990. Currently, the building houses the Scott County Arts & Cultural Center.

The building is designated a Kentucky Landmark. It was listed on the National Register of Historic Places in 2002.

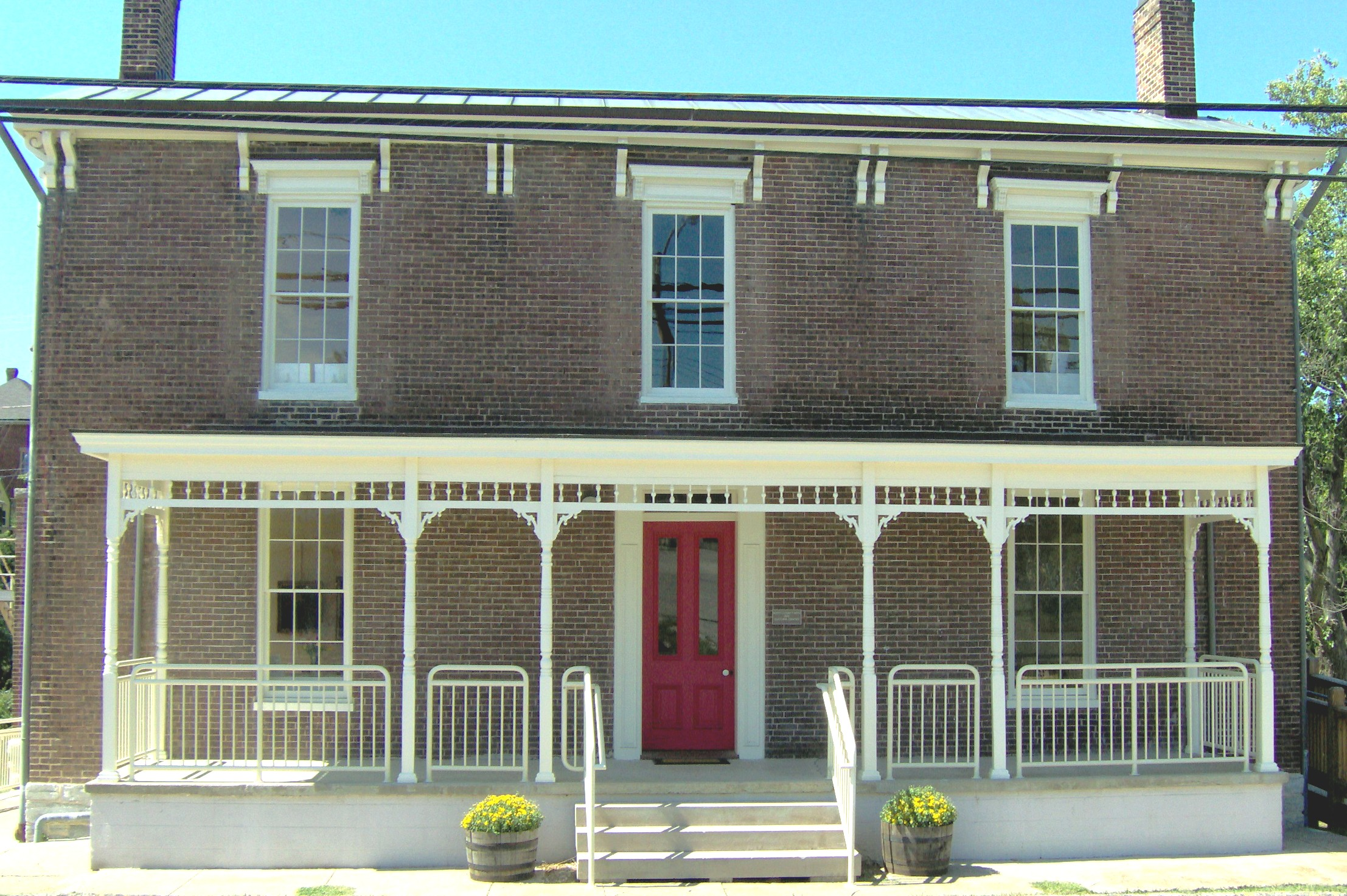
2007 view of another part of the Scott County Jail Complex, in use as the Scott County Arts & Cultural Center. This was probably the Jailer's Dwelling

The Jailer's Dwelling, built in 1892, is a brick Italianate-style two-story three-bay building on stone foundation. It is 44 by 21 feet (13.4 m × 6.4 m) in plan, not including an ell which extends an additional 18 feet (5.5 m) to the rear.
