= Giddings Hall, Georgetown College =

- U.S. National Register of Historic Places
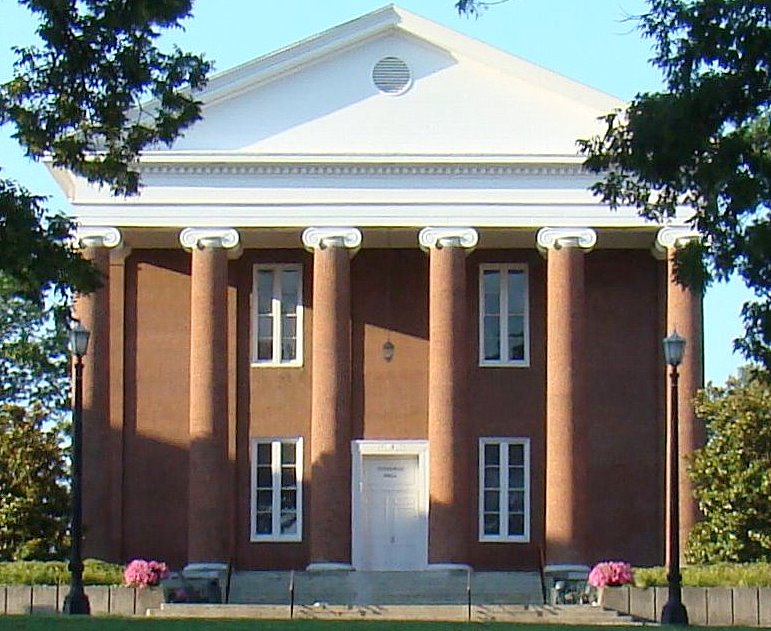

- Location within Kentucky Location within the United States
- Location: Georgetown, Kentucky
- Coordinates: 38°12′25″N 84°33′17″W
- Built: 1839
- Architect: J. E. Farnam
- Architectural style: Greek Revival
- NRHP reference No.: 73000836
- Added to NRHP: February 6, 1973

Giddings Hall, originally called Recitation Hall, is a Greek Revival building located on the campus of Georgetown College in Scott County, Kentucky. Georgetown was the first Baptist college founded west of the Allegheny Mountains, and Giddings Hall was the first permanent structure constructed after the college was formed. The building is named after Rockwood Giddings, the third president of the school. The property was added to the U.S. National Register of Historic Places on February 6, 1973.

== History ==
In 1829, the Kentucky Legislature chartered the Kentucky Baptist Education Society with the purpose of establishing a Baptist college in the state. The town of Georgetown was selected for the site of the school because the community agreed to raise $20,000 and to donate the assets of Rittenhouse Academy, a failed land grant school in the town that had recently closed.

In 1839, Rev. Rockwood Giddings became the third president of the college. During his tenure as president, Giddings began construction on Recitation Hall, the first permanent building for the school.

College tradition states that Jonathan E. Farnam, professor of mathematics, drew the original plans for the building, and that architect A.T. Rice drew the final design. A local African-American mason laid the foundation, and a local brickmason named A.L. White built the walls.

The structure is currently used as the main administrative building for the campus. Previously, rooms in the building have been used as a chapel, a library, classrooms, and a theater.

== Architecture ==
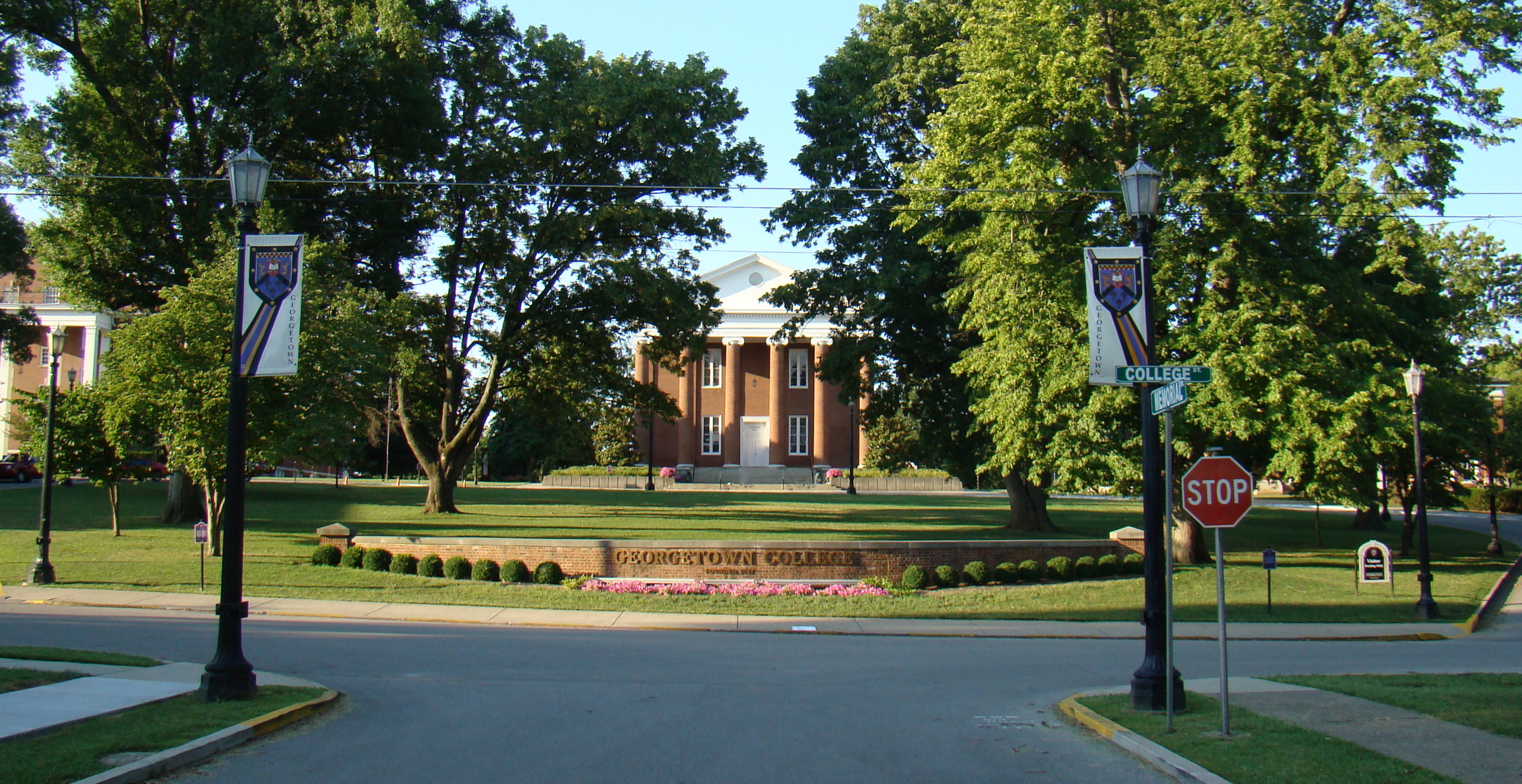

Giddings Hall is a two-story rectangular temple-style Greek Revival brick building situated at a prominent central campus location at the head of Giddings Circle.

The building has four levels, including a stone basement and a deep attic. The brick is laid in Flemish bond on all four sides, and wide pilasters delineate the bays on all facades. The central front facade is a two-story pedimented portico with six brick graduated columns with Ionic capitals. The college's early association with Elijah Craig, who historically is linked to inventing Bourbon whiskey, has fueled a local legend claiming that "a quart of bourbon reposes under each of the six Ionic columns of the portico".

The double windows and Italianate style hoodmolds were added in 1879 when Pawling Hall was constructed.
