= Georgetown East Main Street Residential District =

Historic district in Kentucky, United States

- U.S. National Register of Historic Places
- U.S. Historic district
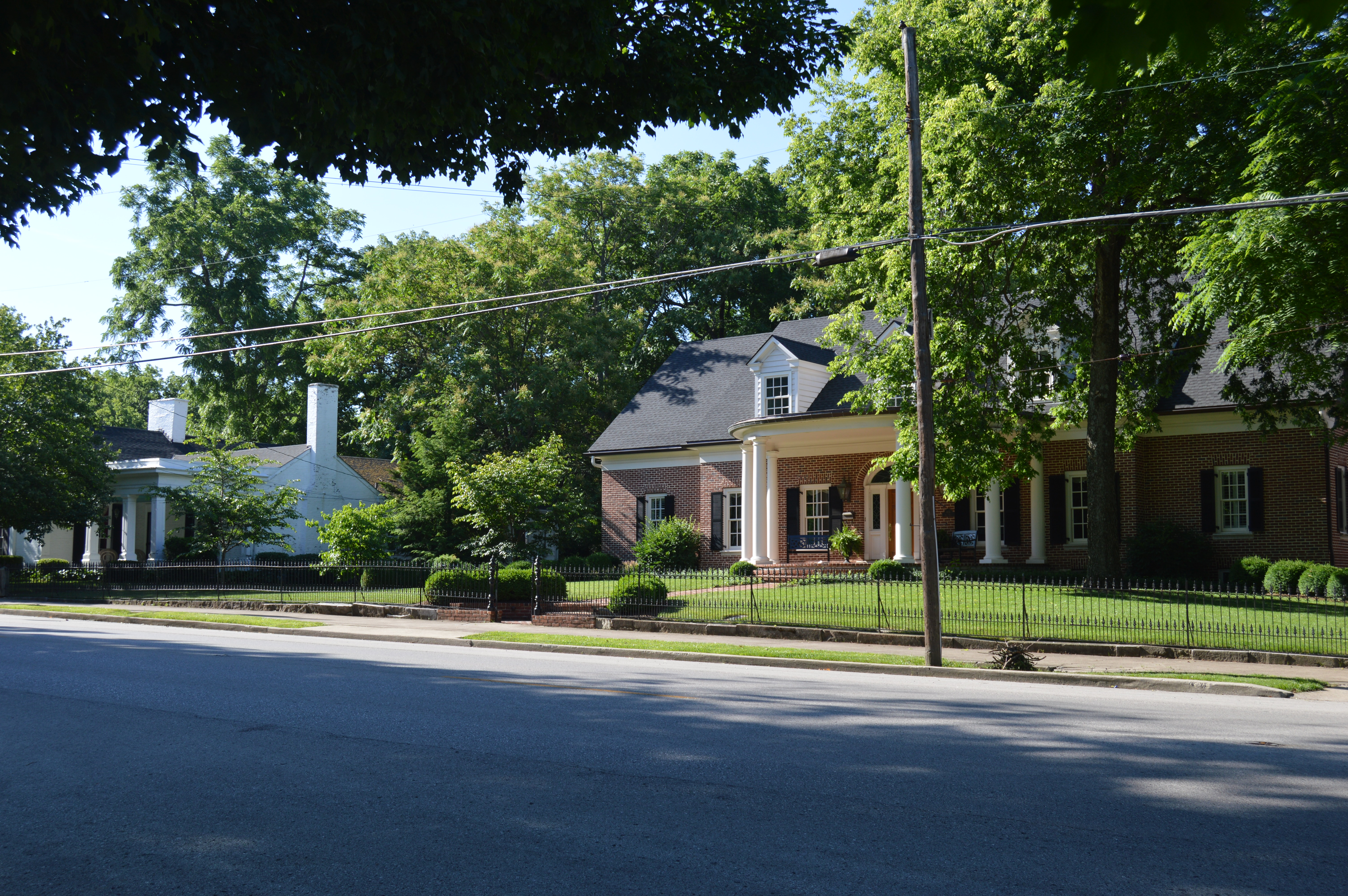

- Location within Kentucky Location within the United States
- Location: Georgetown, Kentucky
- Coordinates: 38°12′34″N 84°33′15″W
- Area: 22 acres (8.9 ha)
- Architect: Multiple
- Architectural style: Classical Revival, Late Victorian, Federal
- NRHP reference No.: 78001396
- Added to NRHP: June 7, 1978

The Georgetown East Main Street Residential District is a 22 acres (8.9 ha) historic district located in Georgetown, Kentucky. The area was added to the U.S. National Register of Historic Places in 1978. It included 41 contributing buildings.

The district has an irregular shape, generally running along Main St. between Warrendale Ave. and Mulberry St.

A few properties in the district are:

- Scott County Post Office (1914–15)
- Georgetown Presbyterian (1865–70), brick Gothic Revival church
- Shropshire House, separately listed
- James Emison House (1820), one half of a two-story double brick house
