= Great Crossing, Kentucky =

Unincorporated community in Kentucky, United States

Great Crossing
- Unincorporated community
- Location within the state of Kentucky Great Crossing (the United States)
- Coordinates: 38°12′52″N 84°36′19″W
- Country: United States
- State: Kentucky
- County: Scott
- Elevation: 810 ft (250 m)
- Time zone: UTC-5 (Eastern (EST))
  - Summer (DST): UTC-4 (EDT)
- GNIS feature ID: 493245

Great Crossing is an unincorporated community located in Scott County, Kentucky, United States.

== Geography ==
Great Crossing is located in west-central Scott County at 38°12'56.1"N 84°36'21.1"W and is part of the Lexington-Fayette metropolitan area.

Kentucky Route 227 bisects the center of the community, and U.S. Route 460 passes south of the community center. Georgetown is 3 miles (4.8 km) to the east, Stamping Ground is 6 miles (9.7 km) to the northwest, and Frankfort is 16 miles (26 km) to the west.

Elkhorn Creek, an 18 mile long navigable waterway, bisects the community.

== Climate ==
The climate in this area is characterized by hot, humid summers and generally mild to cool winters. According to the Köppen Climate Classification system, Great Crossing has a humid subtropical climate, abbreviated "Cfa" on climate maps.

== History ==
Great Crossing was founded in 1783 by Robert Johnson. The location was centered around a shallow area where bison had crossed the Elkhorn Creek. The community was also known as Johnson's Station, Great Buffalo Crossing, The Great Crossing and The Crossing. A post office operated in the community from 1811 to 1905.

== See also ==
- Great Crossing High School, a school in nearby Georgetown that opened in 2019 and is indirectly named for the community
