= Sadieville, Kentucky =

- City
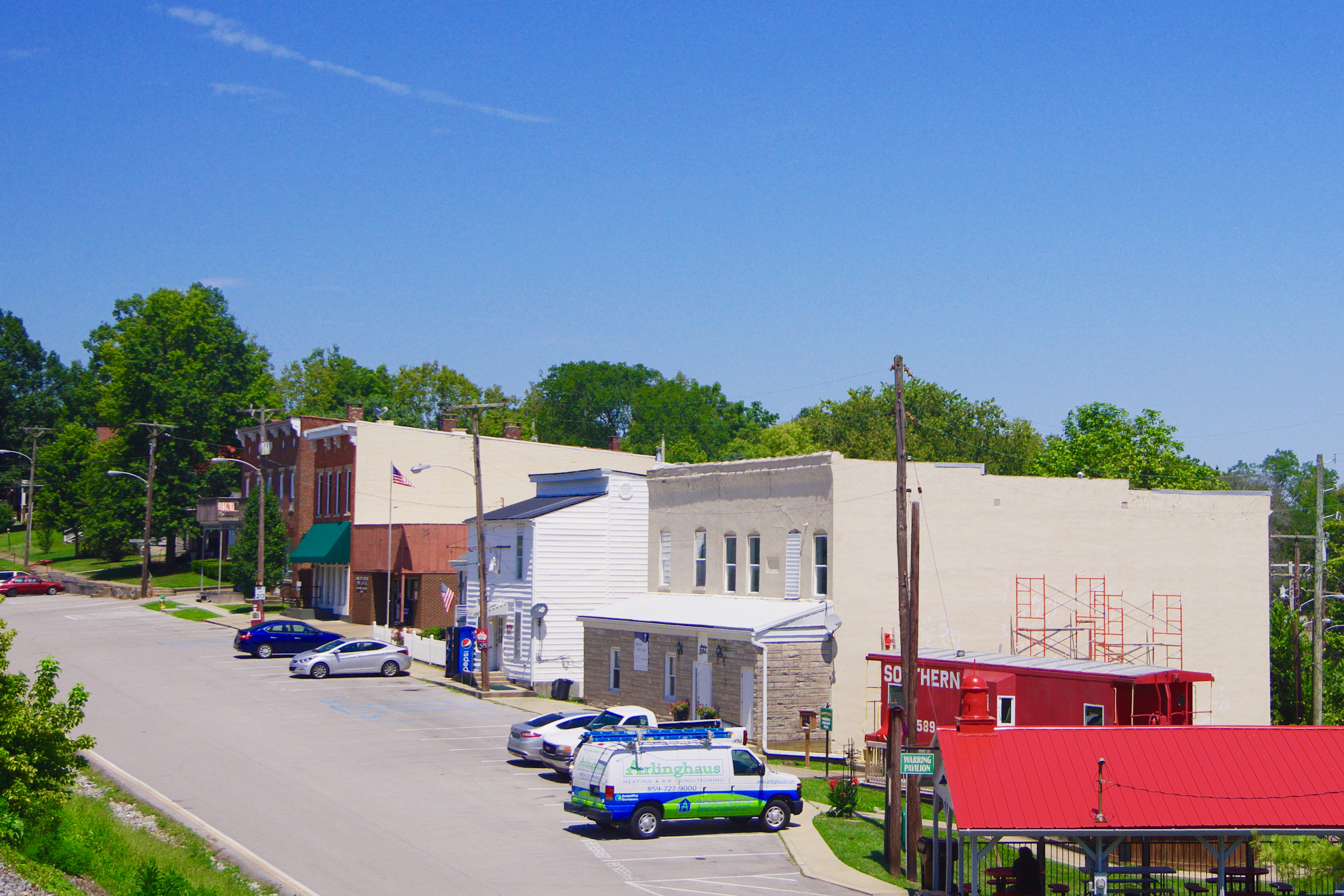
- Main Street

- Location of Sadieville in Scott County, Kentucky.
- Coordinates: 38°23′17″N 84°32′58″W
- Country: United States
- State: Kentucky
- County: Scott
- Incorporated: 1880
- Named for: a respected area woman

Area
  - Total: 1.11 sq mi (2.88 km^{2})
  - Land: 1.08 sq mi (2.81 km^{2})
  - Water: 0.027 sq mi (0.07 km^{2})
- Elevation: 837 ft (255 m)

Population (2020)
  - Total: 320
  - Density: 295.4/sq mi (114.07/km^{2})
- Time zone: UTC-5 (Eastern (EST))
  - Summer (DST): UTC-4 (EDT)
- ZIP code: 40370
- Area code: 502
- FIPS code: 21-67656
- GNIS feature ID: 2405387
- Website: www.sadievilleky.gov

Sadieville is a home rule-class city in Scott County, Kentucky, in the United States. As of the 2020 census, Sadieville had a population of 320. It is part of the Lexington-Fayette Metropolitan Statistical Area. With the motto that makes sense, "We're more than a small town in Kentucky."

== History ==
Sadieville is a railroad town, having grown up after the Cincinnati Southern Railroad was built through the area in 1876. The post office was established in 1878 and named for Sarah Martha "Sadie" Emison Pack, a respected local. The city was incorporated in 1880.

The Burgess and Gano Company formerly made Sadieville the largest market for shipping yearling mules and colts in the United States.

== Geography ==
Sadieville is located where Ky. 32 crosses Eagle Creek. The site formerly boasted a covered bridge. According to the United States Census Bureau, the city has a total area of 0.7 square miles (1.8 km^{2}), all land.

== Demographics ==
Historical population
Census	Pop.	Note	%±
1890	170		—
1900	532		212.9%
1910	467		−12.2%
1920	448		−4.1%
1930	527		17.6%
1940	477		−9.5%
1950	355		−25.6%
1960	276		−22.3%
1970	272		−1.4%
1980	253		−7.0%
1990	255		0.8%
2000	263		3.1%
2010	303		15.2%
2020	320		5.6%
U.S. Decennial Census

As of the census of 2000, there were 263 people, 96 households, and 79 families residing in the city. The population density was 371.8 inhabitants per square mile (143.6/km^{2}). There were 114 housing units at an average density of 161.2 per square mile (62.2/km^{2}). The racial makeup of the city was 93.54% White, 5.32% African American, and 1.14% from two or more races.

There were 96 households, out of which 43.8% had children under the age of 18 living with them, 70.8% were married couples living together, 9.4% had a female householder with no husband present, and 16.7% were non-families. 14.6% of all households were made up of individuals, and 11.5% had someone living alone who was 65 years of age or older. The average household size was 2.74 and the average family size was 3.00.

In the city, the population was spread out, with 30.0% under the age of 18, 6.5% from 18 to 24, 31.9% from 25 to 44, 22.1% from 45 to 64, and 9.5% who were 65 years of age or older. The median age was 35 years. For every 100 females, there were 90.6 males. For every 100 females age 18 and over, there were 84.0 males.

The median income for a household in the city was $39,583, and the median income for a family was $42,222. Males had a median income of $35,750 versus $20,500 for females. The per capita income for the city was $15,648. About 5.7% of families and 9.6% of the population were below the poverty line, including 6.3% of those under the age of eighteen and 25.0% of those 65 or over.

== Notable residents ==
- Robert H. Brooks - soldier, first Army Armored Branch casualty of World War II
- James Baker Hall - author, photographer, and Poet Laureate of Kentucky
