= Shropshire House (Scott County, Kentucky) =

Historic house in Kentucky, United States

- U.S. National Register of Historic Places
- U.S. Historic district – Contributing property
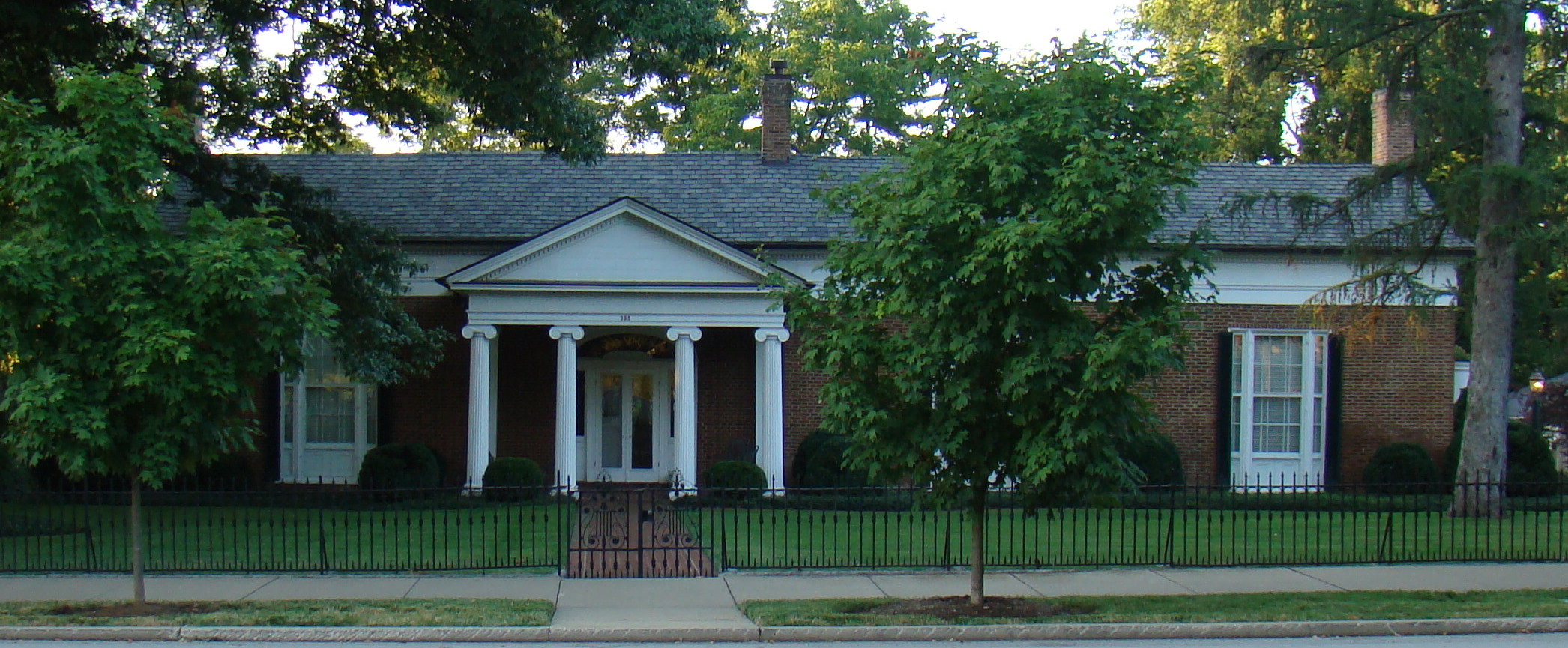

- Location within Kentucky Location within the United States
- Location: Georgetown, Kentucky
- Coordinates: 38°12′36″N 84°33′20″W
- Built: 1814
- Architectural style: Greek Revival Federal style
- Part of: East Main Street Residential District (ID78001396)
- NRHP reference No.: 73000845

Significant dates
- Added to NRHP: April 2, 1973
- Designated CP: June 7, 1978

The Shropshire House is a Greek Revival Federal style house located in the East Main Street Residential Historic District in Georgetown, Kentucky. The house was the built in 1814 by John and Mary (Gano) Buckner. The property was added to the U.S. National Register of Historic Places on April 2, 1973.

== History ==
The Shropshire House is a residential dwelling built in 1814 by John and Mary (Gano) Buckner on East Main Street near the downtown area of Georgetown. The house is located in the East Main Street Residential District; an area designated a historically significant location by the U.S. National Registered of Historic Places because of its importance in the history of the city.

Both John and Mary Buckner came from families that were early settler in central Kentucky.

In 1818, the property was sold to Alexander Parker, who resold the home to Elizabeth Lewis as a residence for her daughter Sophia and her husband, John T. Johnson. Johnson lived in the house while he served in the United States Congress.

Robert J. Ward purchased the property in 1828 and lived in the home with his family until they moved to Louisville, Kentucky in 1833.

George W. Johnson, future Confederate governor of Kentucky, bought the property from the Ward's.

John C. Miller purchased the house in 1835. In 1894 Joel Penn bought the house. J. Gano Shropshire and his wife, Nancy "Nannie" (nee Burgess), purchased the house in 1918 and did extensive remodeling of the structure.

== Architecture ==
The Shropshire House is a single story structure built in the Federal style with renovations done in the 1840s in the Greek Revival style.
