= Oxford, Kentucky =

Unincorporated community in Kentucky, United States

Oxford
- Unincorporated community
- Location within the state of Kentucky Oxford (the United States)
- Coordinates: 38°16′6″N 84°30′11″W
- Country: United States
- State: Kentucky
- County: Scott
- Elevation: 961 ft (293 m)
- Time zone: UTC-5 (Eastern (EST))
  - Summer (DST): UTC-4 (EDT)
- GNIS feature ID: 500088

Oxford is an unincorporated community located in Scott County, Kentucky, United States. It was also known as Marion.
