= Elkwood, Virginia =

Unincorporated community in Virginia, United States

- Census Designated Place
- Location within Virginia Location within the United States
- Coordinates: 38°30′42″N 77°51′21″W
- Country: United States
- State: Virginia
- County: Culpeper
- Elevation: 315 ft (96 m)
- Time zone: UTC-5 (Eastern (EST))
  - Summer (DST): UTC-4 (EDT)
- ZIP code: 22718
- Area code: 540
- GNIS feature ID: 1466241

Elkwood is a Census Designated Place in Culpeper County, Virginia, United States. Elkwood is located on U.S. Route 15, 8.1 miles (13.0 km) east-northeast of Culpeper. Elkwood has a post office with ZIP code 22718.

== Climate ==
The climate in this area is characterized by hot, humid summers and generally mild to cool winters. According to the Köppen Climate Classification system, Elkwood has a humid subtropical climate, abbreviated "Cfa" on climate maps.
