= Garth School =

- U.S. National Register of Historic Places
- U.S. Historic district – Contributing property
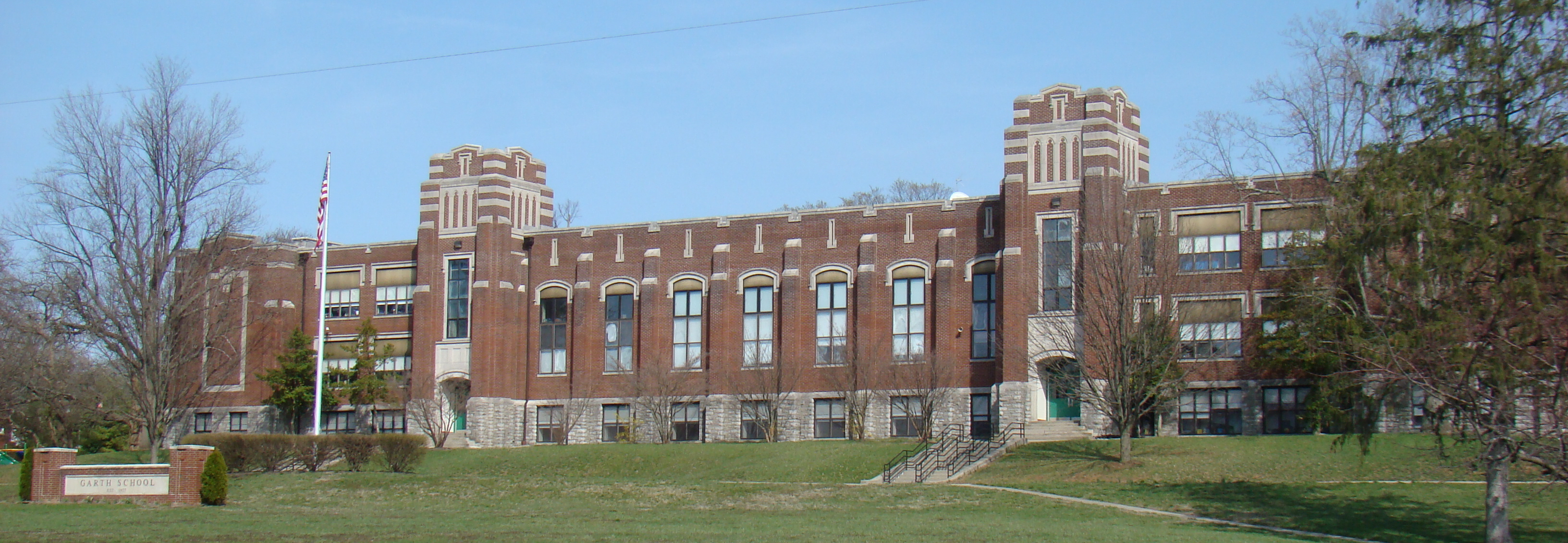
- Garth School

- Location within Kentucky Location within the United States
- Location: 501 S. Hamilton St., Georgetown, Kentucky
- Coordinates: 38°12′21″N 84°33′32″W
- Built: 1925
- Architect: Frankel & Curtis; Et al.
- Architectural style: Late Gothic Revival, Bungalow/Craftsman, Collegiate Gothic
- Part of: South Broadway Neighborhood District (ID91001856)
- NRHP reference No.: 88002187

Significant dates
- Added to NRHP: November 16, 1988
- Designated CP: December 19, 1991

Garth School is an historic school building located on South Broadway Street in Georgetown, Kentucky. Built in 1925 as a high school, the building currently houses Garth Elementary School. The property was listed on the National Register of Historic Places on November 16, 1988.

It is a Collegiate Gothic-style 250 by 110 feet (76 m × 34 m) red brick building with stone trim. It overlooks a 6 acres (2.4 ha) lawn with two terraces.
