= Holy Trinity Episcopal Church (Georgetown, Kentucky) =

Historic church in Kentucky, United States

- U.S. National Register of Historic Places
- U.S. Historic district – Contributing property
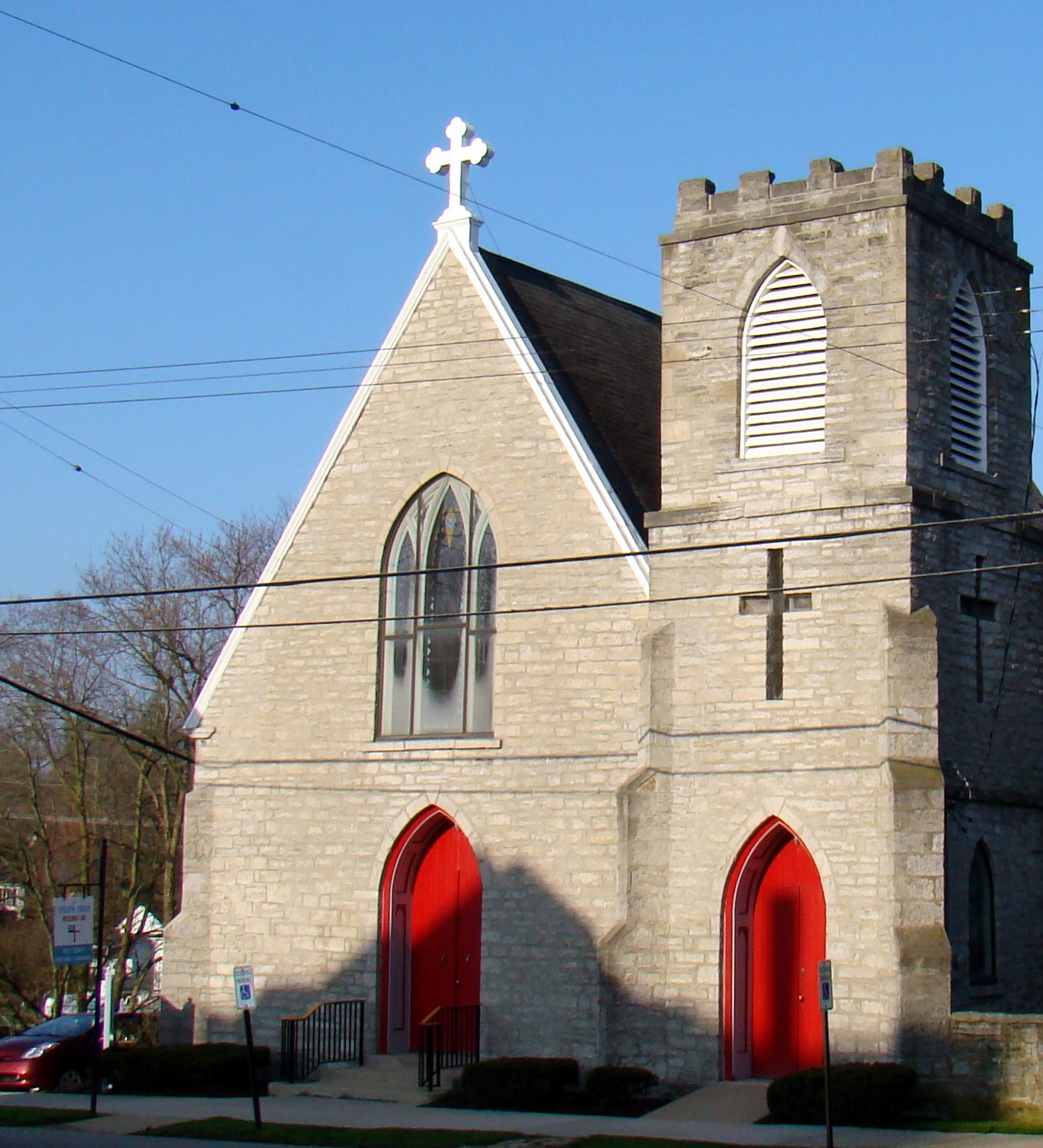
- Holy Trinity Episcopal Church

- Location within Kentucky Location within the United States
- Location: S. Broadway and W. Clinton Sts., Georgetown, Kentucky
- Coordinates: 38°12′28″N 84°33′38″W
- Area: 1 acre (0.40 ha)
- Built: 1867
- Built by: John & Henry Clarke
- Architect: Benjamin Bosworth Smith
- Architectural style: Gothic architecture
- Part of: South Broadway Neighborhood District (ID91001856)
- NRHP reference No.: 73000837

Significant dates
- Added to NRHP: October 30, 1973
- Designated CP: December 19, 1991

Holy Trinity Episcopal Church (also known as the Church of the Holy Trinity) is an Episcopal Church located in Georgetown, Kentucky.

== History ==
The Church of the Holy Trinity was organized in 1847 through the efforts of the Reverend J. N. Norton, rector of the Church of the Ascension, Frankfort, during the episcopate of Bishop Benjamin Bosworth Smith, the first bishop of Kentucky. The church building was constructed during the years 1864–1868 by John and Henry Clarke, outstanding churchmen and craftsmen whose wood carvings decorate the interior of the building. The stone for the church was quarried from the actual site and much of the construction was done by lamp light. The church was consecrated on June 23, 1870, by the Right Reverend George David Cummins, second bishop of Kentucky. The church building is designated a Kentucky Landmark and is on the National Register of Historic Places.

During the early 1900s, Holy Trinity suffered from dwindling membership and lack of money. From 1925 until 1959, the parish reverted to mission status. The return to parish status in the latter year was the result of work by the members under the leadership of their rector, the Reverend William D. Smith. When Canon Smith and his wife Beulah (affectionately known as Mr. Bill and Miss Beulah) came to Holy Trinity in 1948, the congregation numbered only 20 members. The Smiths revived the spirit of the congregation and helped rebuild the community over the next twenty-two years.

A parish hall was built in 1966. Free-standing and modern, it is compatible with the Gothic architecture of the church building. Adjacent to the church and parish hall is a memorial garden. Incorporated within the memorial garden is a columbarium for the interment of those choosing cremation.

In 1987 the church applied for federal funds to build Trinity Apartments which is still providing safe housing for elderly residents. In 1999 the church donated land behind the parish hall for the construction of a new facility for the Georgetown Child Development Center. Although its members control its board and the two buildings are joined, the childcare facility is a separate corporate entity.
