= First African Baptist Church Parsonage (Columbus, Georgia) =

Historic church in Georgia, United States

- U.S. National Register of Historic Places
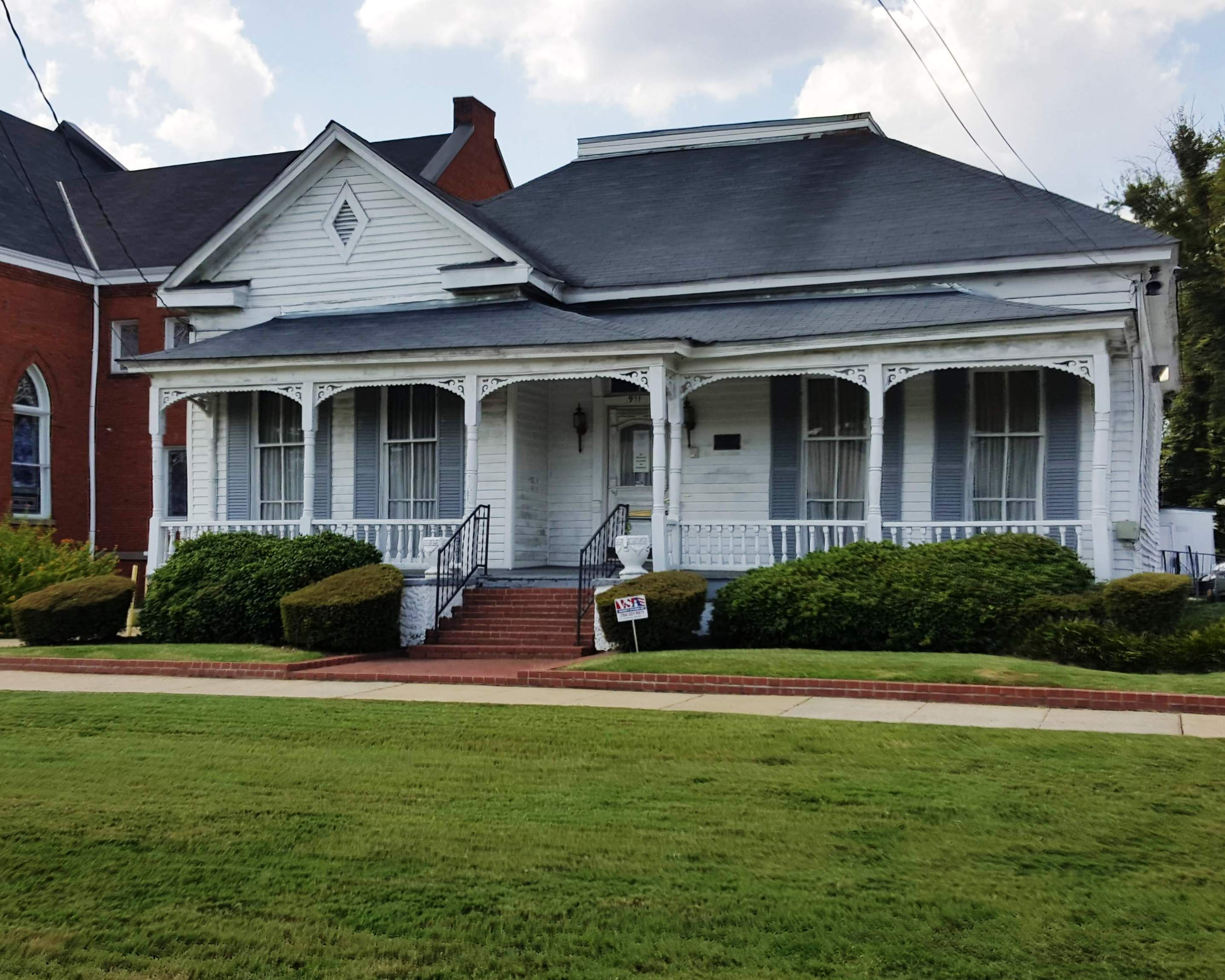

- Location within Georgia Location within the United States
- Location: 911 5th Ave., Columbus, Georgia
- Coordinates: 32°27′47″N 84°59′12″W
- Area: less than one acre
- Built: 1915
- Architectural style: Late Victorian
- MPS: Columbus MRA
- NRHP reference No.: 80001166
- Added to NRHP: September 29, 1980

The First African Baptist Church Parsonage in Columbus, Georgia is a historic church parsonage at 911 5th Avenue. It is a one-story Victorian cottage with Eastlake trim that was built in 1915–16. It was added to the National Register of Historic Places in 1980.

In 1916 it was the residence of Rev. J. Henry Smith, pastor of the First African Baptist Church. It was home of Rev. Jacob T. Brown in 1918 and was the home of Rev. Broadus H. Hogan in 1918. Both were pastors of the church.

It was listed on the National Register along with other historic properties identified in a large survey.
