= Elkwood (Georgetown, Kentucky) =

Historic house in Kentucky, United States

- U.S. National Register of Historic Places
- Location within Kentucky Location within the United States
- Nearest city: Georgetown, Kentucky
- Coordinates: 38°13′35″N 84°35′47″W
- Area: 1.3 acres (0.53 ha)
- Built: c.1810
- NRHP reference No.: 78001395
- Added to NRHP: January 20, 1978

Elkwood in Georgetown, Kentucky, also known as the Sabret and Nancy Payne Offut House, is a stone house built in c.1810. It was listed on the National Register of Historic Places in 1978.

Modifications in the 1860s or 1870s added two dormers and a central gable, and lengthened four windows. A one-story Victorian porch was added but later was removed.

It is associated with John Payne (1764–1837), one of Scott County's earliest settlers and a brigadier general in the War of 1812.

It is not far from the John Payne House, also listed on the National Register.
