= Buford-Duke House =

Historic house in Kentucky, United States

- U.S. National Register of Historic Places
- Location: Scott County, Kentucky
- Coordinates: 38°10′19″N 84°31′54″W
- Built: 1790s
- NRHP reference No.: 73000833
- Added to NRHP: June 19, 1973

The Buford-Duke House is antebellum house located in Scott County, Kentucky.

The 11-room brick residence was originally constructed in 1792 by Col. Abram Buford who fought in the French and Indian War and the American Revolution. For his service, Buford was given several thousand acres of farm land in Kentucky to which he raised thoroughbred sires; he was instrumental in the development of the horse industry in the state. With assistance from his brother, two horses owned by Buford were named the first course winners in the Kentucky Gazette in 1795.

Buford's daughter married James K. Duke, a graduate of Yale Law School. After Buford died in 1833, Duke inherited the residence, which was enlarged and reoriented to the south. The woodland pasture in front of the house became a noted dueling ground, and also hosted lavish parties.

Duke's nephew, General Basil Duke, graduated from law from Transylvania University in Lexington, Kentucky. Basil came to live with his uncle, James Duke, after the divorce of his parents. Basil married Henrietta Morgan, sister of John Hunt Morgan, in 1861. Basil became a lieutenant in Morgan's Second Kentucky Cavalry. After Morgan's death, he was promoted to brigade commander. He later practiced law in Louisville, Kentucky and served as counsel for the Louisville and Nashville Railroad. He was elected to the state legislature in 1869.

A portion of the land the house resides on became the Kentucky Horse Park in 1978.
