= Branham House (Georgetown, Kentucky) =

Historic house in Kentucky, United States

- U.S. National Register of Historic Places
- U.S. Historic district – Contributing property
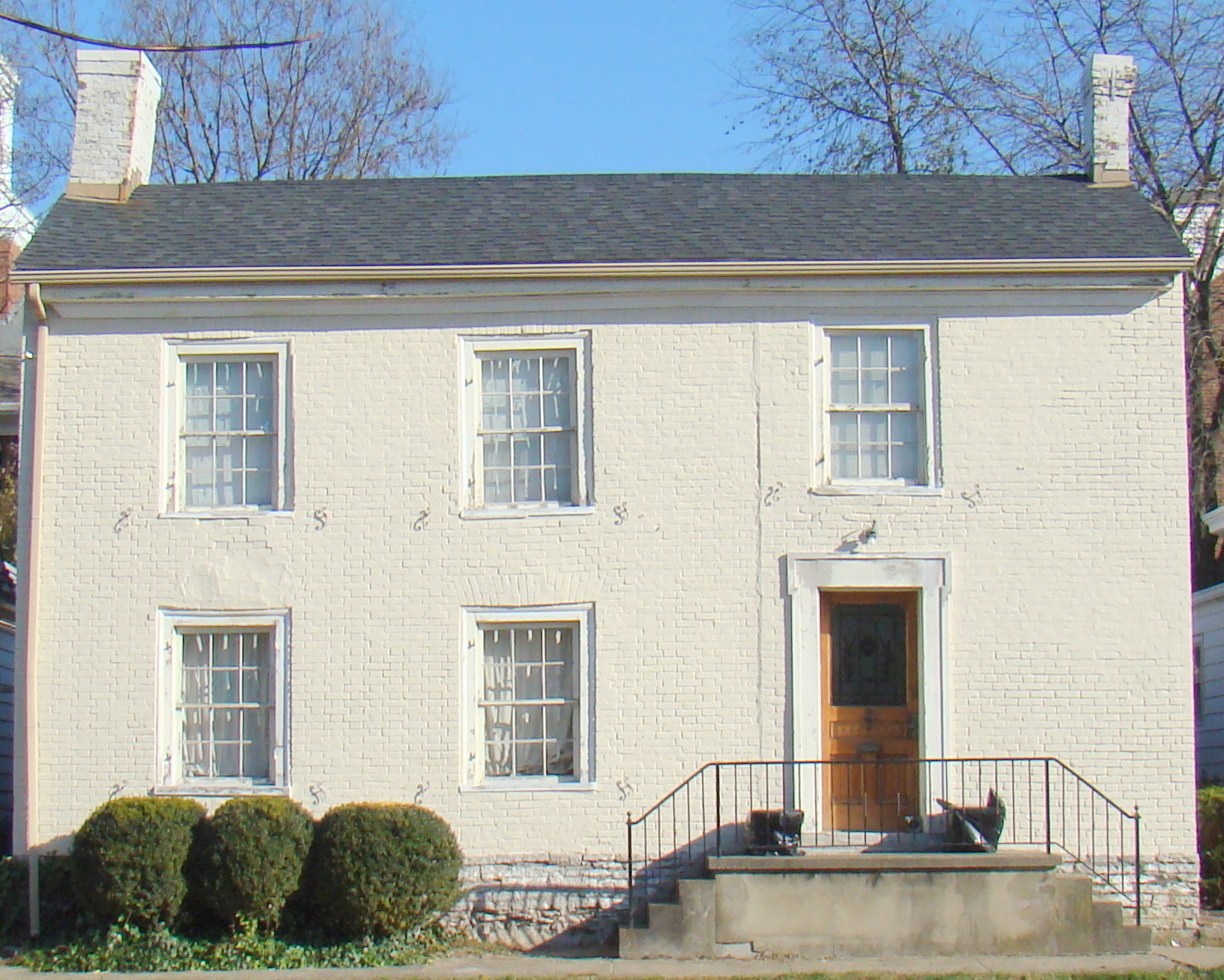

- Location within Kentucky Location within the United States
- Location: Georgetown, Kentucky
- Coordinates: 38°12′29″N 84°33′36″W
- Built: c.1795
- Part of: South Broadway Neighborhood District (ID91001856)
- NRHP reference No.: 73000832

Significant dates
- Added to NRHP: April 2, 1973
- Designated CP: December 19, 1991

The Branham House is residential dwelling located in the South Broadway Neighborhood Historic District in Georgetown, Kentucky. The property was individually listed on the U.S. National Register of Historic Places in 1973.

It is the oldest house in the City of Georgetown, which was incorporated in 1790, and was probably built in the 1790s. It is a two-story three-bay brick house, on a stone foundation, with some frame elements. Its Greek Revival front portico was added later.
