= First African Baptist Church and Parsonage (Scott County, Kentucky) =

Historic church in Kentucky, United States

- U.S. National Register of Historic Places
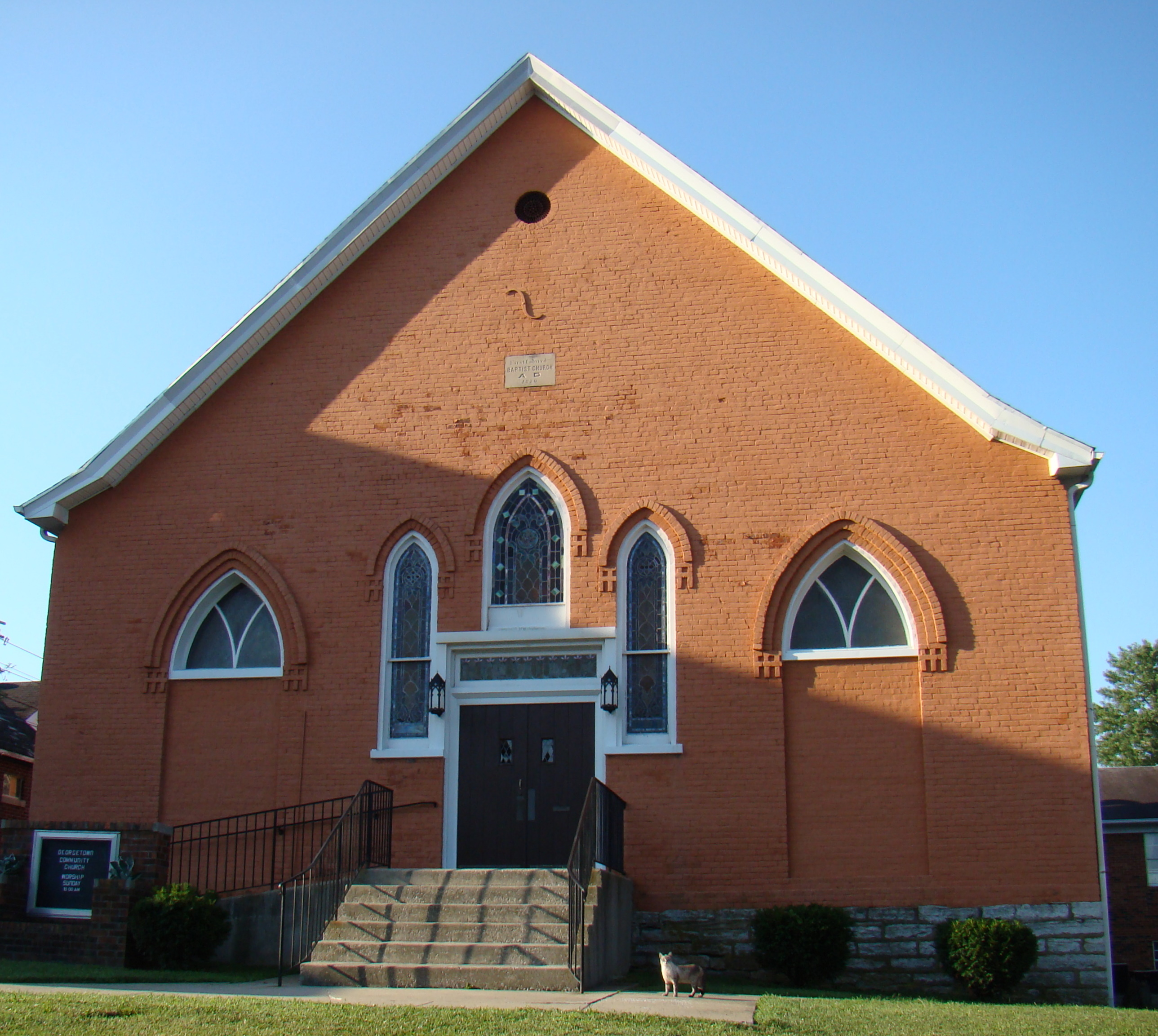

- Location within Kentucky Location within the United States
- Location: Georgetown, Kentucky
- Coordinates: 38°12′45″N 84°33′40″W
- Built: 1870
- NRHP reference No.: 84001985
- Added to NRHP: March 1, 1984

First African Baptist Church and Parsonage is an historically significant church building and an associated parsonage located in the United States on West Jefferson Avenue in Georgetown, Kentucky. In 1842, First Baptist Church moved from their West Jefferson location to a site closer to Georgetown College on College and Hamilton Streets. The church's previous building and property were leased to local black Baptists so a new congregation solely for blacks could be formed. The current building was constructed in 1870. The buildings were added to the U.S. National Register of Historic Places in 1984.

== History ==
The First Baptist Church congregation in Georgetown, Kentucky was organized in 1811, and its first meeting house erected on West Jefferson Street in 1815. In 1842 Howard Malcom, the pastor of the church and president of Georgetown College, urged the relocation of the church to a site near the college. The congregation moved from their West Jefferson location to a site on College and Hamilton Streets. The building at the original site was leased to black congregation. G. W. Dupee, a slave, was the first official pastor of the black congregation. Reuben Lee was pastor when the current building was constructed in 1870.

== Architecture ==
The church building has a Gothic Revival style. The original twin doors to accommodate women and men separately entering have been closed on the front facade and replaced with "a single centered entrance highlighted by three lancet arches."

== See also ==
- National Register of Historic Places listings in Kentucky
