= Scott County Courthouse (Kentucky) =

- U.S. National Register of Historic Places
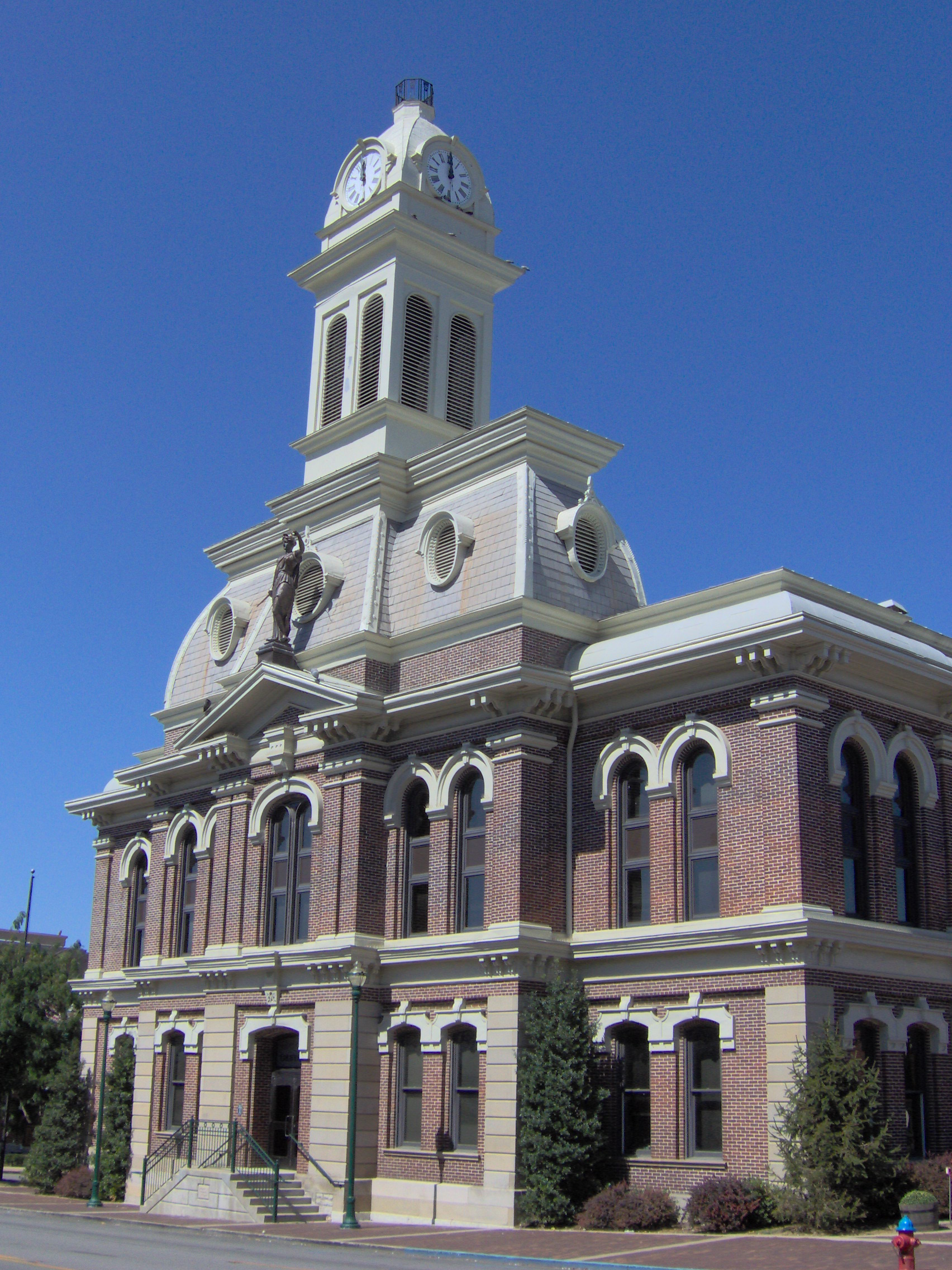
- Scott County Courthouse

- Location within Kentucky Location within the United States
- Location: Georgetown, Kentucky
- Coordinates: 38°12′36″N 84°33′34″W
- Built: 1877
- Architect: Thomas Boyd
- Architectural style: Second Empire
- NRHP reference No.: 72000542
- Added to NRHP: September 28, 1972

Scott County Courthouse is a building in Georgetown, Kentucky, the county seat of Scott County, Kentucky, where county government offices are located. The property was added to the United States National Register of Historic Places on September 28, 1972.

== History ==
Scott County became the state of Kentucky's eleventh county on June 1, 1792, by the newly formed Kentucky Legislature from a section of Woodford County. The county was named after Charles Scott, an American Revolutionary War general who later was Kentucky's fourth governor.

The first Scott County Courthouse was built in 1792 on a 1-acre (4,000 m^{2}) lot sold to the county by Elijah Craig. The original building was replaced by a larger structure. A third courthouse was built in 1847 after a fire destroyed the second courthouse. The August 9, 1837, fire destroyed most of the records. A second fire in 1876 again destroyed Scott County courthouse and the fourth courthouse was built. This fourth courthouse remains today but is no longer used for trials but instead other official government affairs. The building was added to the National Register of Historic Places on September 28, 1972.

== Location ==
The Scott County Courthouse is located in the center of downtown Georgetown, Kentucky at the intersection of Broadway and Main Street, where U.S. Route 25 (Broadway) crosses U.S. Route 460 (Main Street).

== Architecture ==
The 1877 courthouse was designed by Pittsburgh, Pennsylvania architect Thomas W. Boyd in the Second Empire style at the cost of $34,600. The distance from the ground to the top of the steeple is 185 feet (56 m).
