= Scott County, Kentucky =

County in Kentucky, United States

- County
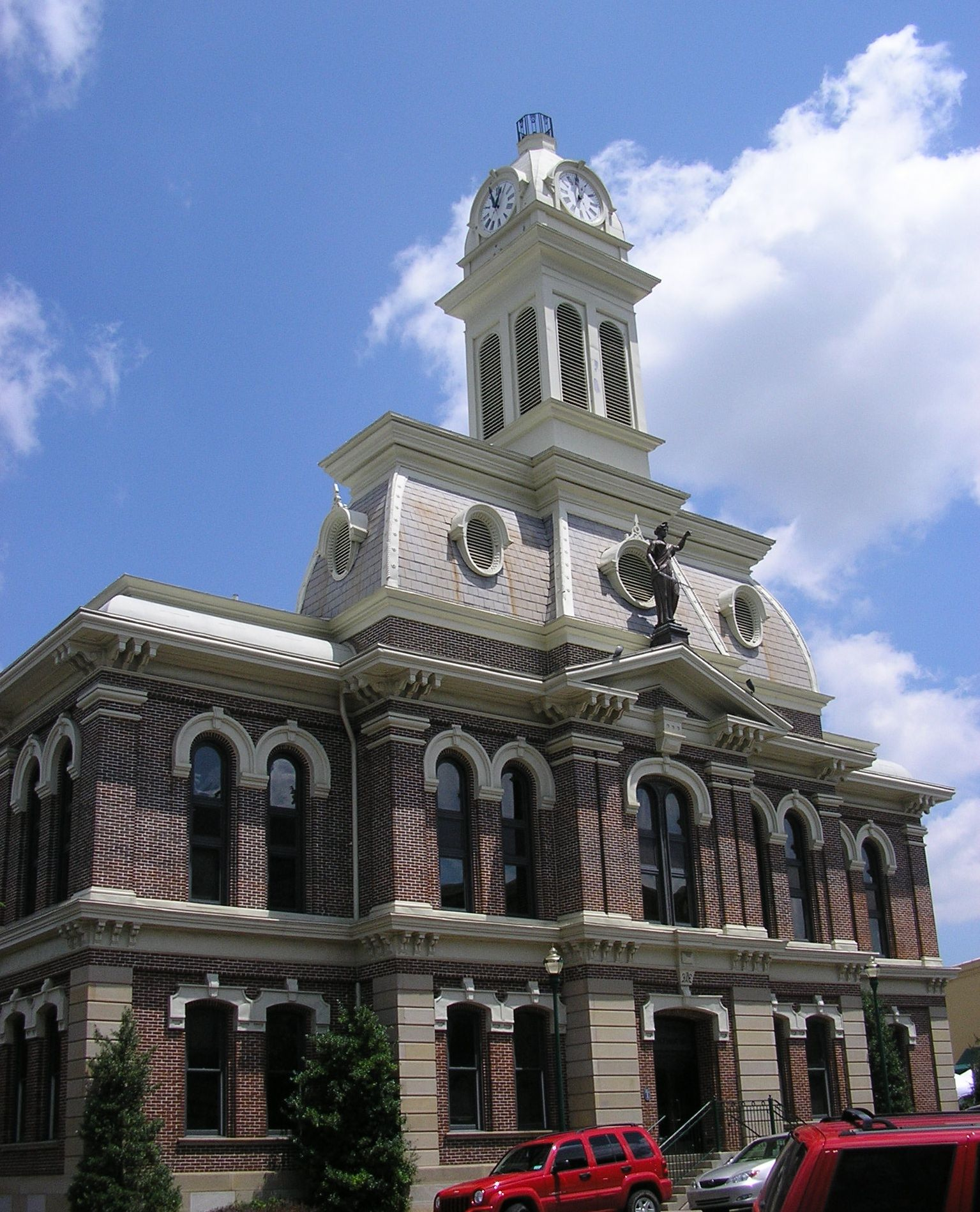
- Scott County courthouse in Georgetown

- Location within the U.S. state of Kentucky
- Coordinates: 38°18′N 84°35′W
- Country: United States
- State: Kentucky
- Founded: 1792
- Named for: General Charles Scott
- Seat: Georgetown
- Largest city: Georgetown

Government
  - Judge/Executive: Joe Pat Covington (R)

Area
  - Total: 285 sq mi (740 km^{2})
  - Land: 282 sq mi (730 km^{2})
  - Water: 3.7 sq mi (9.6 km^{2}) 1.3%

Population (2020)
  - Total: 57,155
  - Estimate (2025): 62,262 ▲
  - Density: 203/sq mi (78.3/km^{2})
- Time zone: UTC−5 (Eastern)
  - Summer (DST): UTC−4 (EDT)
- Congressional district: 6th
- Website: www.scottky.gov

Scott County is a county located in the north central part of the U.S. state of Kentucky. As of the 2020 census, the population was 57,155. Scott County is part of the Lexington-Fayette, Kentucky Metropolitan Statistical Area. Its county seat and largest city is Georgetown.

== History ==
Native Americans inhabited the Scott County area from perhaps 15,000 years ago. Evidence has been identified that belongs the Adena culture (800 B.C. - 800 A.D.), including several significant Adena mounds.

The area was explored by American explorers as early as 1774. One of the earliest settlers was John McClelland from Pennsylvania, who built McLelland's Fort overlooking the Georgetown spring. During the American Revolution, pro-British Native Americans attacked McLelland's Fort in 1777, causing the settlement to be abandoned. Six years later, a new and permanent settlement was founded by Robert and Jemima Johnson, who built Johnson Station (later called Great Crossing), near the north fork of Elkhorn Creek, about five miles west of today's Georgetown.

All of Kentucky was originally part of Virginia's frontier. However, in 1776 Virginia reorganized it as Kentucky County. In 1780 this county was divided into the three large counties of Lincoln, Jefferson, and Fayette. In 1788, Fayette County was divided to create Woodford County.

On June 1, 1792, the state of Kentucky came into existence. An early act of the new state legislature divided Woodford County into two counties. One of these became Scott County, named for General Charles Scott, a Revolutionary War hero, who would serve as Kentucky's fourth governor (1808–1812). Its area was taken from the existing Woodford County. Other counties established before the end of 1792 were Clark, Shelby, Logan, and Green counties.

In 1784, Elijah Craig (1743–1808), a Virginia preacher, induced the Virginia legislature to incorporate the town of Lebanon, near the site of McLelland's Fort. In 1790 the town's name was changed to George Town, to honor then-President George Washington. Elijah Craig is also credited with founding the county's first classical school, the first sawmill, the first gristmill, the first fulling and paper mill, the first ropewalk, and (possibly) the area's first bourbon whiskey. On December 27, 1787, edition of the Kentucky Gazette, he solicited scholars to study at an academy that would open in January 1788 "in Lebanon town," and would offer courses in Latin, Greek, and "such branches of the sciences as are usually taught in public seminaries." Ten years later the school was absorbed by the Rittenhouse Academy, which was given by the state some 5,900 acres in Christian and Cumberland counties so that they might sell the land to benefit their endowment fund. The academy, in turn, was absorbed by Georgetown College in 1829.

The community went into a decline after the death of Elijah Craig in 1808. When Elder Barton Warren Stone (1772–1844), a founder of the Christian Churches movement during the Great Revival, moved to Georgetown in 1816 to become principal of Rittenhouse Academy, he found the community "notorious for its wickedness and irreligion."

In 1825, the Choctaw Nation established the Choctaw Academy at Blue Spring in Scott County. They operated the school for Choctaw boys until 1842, when it was closed. The staff and records moved to the Choctaw Nation, Indian Territory, where the Choctaw Nation had been relocated in the 1830s. In 1844 the Spencer Academy opened as the school for Choctaw boys, while a school was also opened for girls. Later in the century, they allowed Baptist missionaries to found the Armstrong Academy there.

During the American Civil War, Scott County furnished the Union Army with 118 soldiers, while about 1,000 enlisted in the Confederate Army. On November 18, 1861, Scott County native George W. Johnson was elected the provisional Confederate governor of Kentucky.

In 2019, voters in Scott County approved county-wide alcohol sales.

== Geography ==
According to the United States Census Bureau, the county has a total area of 285 square miles (740 km^{2}), of which 282 square miles (730 km^{2}) is land and 3.7 square miles (9.6 km^{2}) (1.3%) is water.

=== Adjacent counties ===
- Grant County (north)
- Harrison County (northeast)
- Bourbon County (east)
- Fayette County (southeast)
- Woodford County (southwest)
- Franklin County (west)
- Owen County (northwest)

== Demographics ==
Historical population
Census	Pop.	Note	%±
1800	8,007		—
1810	12,419		55.1%
1820	14,219		14.5%
1830	14,677		3.2%
1840	13,668		−6.9%
1850	14,946		9.4%
1860	14,417		−3.5%
1870	11,607		−19.5%
1880	14,965		28.9%
1890	16,546		10.6%
1900	18,076		9.2%
1910	16,956		−6.2%
1920	15,318		−9.7%
1930	14,400		−6.0%
1940	14,314		−0.6%
1950	15,141		5.8%
1960	15,376		1.6%
1970	17,948		16.7%
1980	21,813		21.5%
1990	23,867		9.4%
2000	33,061		38.5%
2010	47,173		42.7%
2020	57,155		21.2%
2025 (est.)	62,262	▲	8.9%
U.S. Decennial Census; 1790–1960 1900–1990; 1990–2000 2010–2020

=== 2020 census ===
As of the 2020 census, the county had a population of 57,155. The median age was 36.2 years. 25.4% of residents were under the age of 18 and 12.8% of residents were 65 years of age or older. For every 100 females there were 96.9 males, and for every 100 females age 18 and over there were 94.5 males age 18 and over.

The racial makeup of the county was 84.9% White, 5.2% Black or African American, 0.3% American Indian and Alaska Native, 1.0% Asian, 0.0% Native Hawaiian and Pacific Islander, 2.1% from some other race, and 6.4% from two or more races. Hispanic or Latino residents of any race comprised 5.4% of the population.

67.7% of residents lived in urban areas, while 32.3% lived in rural areas.

There were 21,371 households in the county, of which 36.5% had children under the age of 18 living with them and 22.3% had a female householder with no spouse or partner present. About 22.4% of all households were made up of individuals and 7.9% had someone living alone who was 65 years of age or older.

There were 22,795 housing units, of which 6.2% were vacant. Among occupied housing units, 69.6% were owner-occupied and 30.4% were renter-occupied. The homeowner vacancy rate was 1.6% and the rental vacancy rate was 7.3%.

=== 2000 census ===
As of the census of 2000, there were 33,061 people, 12,110 households, and 8,985 families residing in the county. The population density was 116 per square mile (45/km^{2}). There were 12,977 housing units at an average density of 46 per square mile (18/km^{2}). The racial makeup of the county was 91.94% White, 5.35% African American, 0.26% Native American, 0.50% Asian, 0.01% Pacific Islander, 0.82% from other races, and 1.13% from two or more races. 1.61% of the population were Hispanic or Latino of any race.

There were 12,110 households, out of which 38.50% had children under the age of 18 living with them, 58.80% were married couples living together, 11.50% had a female householder with no husband present, and 25.80% were non-families. 21.00% of all households were made up of individuals, and 7.00% had someone living alone who was 65 years of age or older. The average household size was 2.61 and the average family size was 3.01.

In the county, the population was spread out, with 26.30% under the age of 18, 11.80% from 18 to 24, 32.60% from 25 to 44, 20.40% from 45 to 64, and 8.90% who were 65 years of age or older. The median age was 32 years. For every 100 females, there were 95.80 males. For every 100 females age 18 and over, there were 90.70 males.

The median income for a household in the county was $47,081, and the median income for a family was $54,117. Males had a median income of $40,604 versus $25,767 for females. The per capita income for the county was $21,490. About 7.30% of families and 8.80% of the population were below the poverty line, including 11.00% of those under age 18 and 12.10% of those age 65 or over.

== Communities ==
=== Cities ===
- Georgetown (county seat)
- Sadieville
- Stamping Ground

=== Unincorporated communities ===
- Great Crossing
- Oxford (a.k.a. Marion)

== Notable people ==
- James C. C. Black - U.S. Representative from Georgia. Born in Stamping Ground.
- J. Campbell Cantrill - politician, U.S. Representative from Kentucky.
- Julia Chinn - common-law wife of Vice President Richard M. Johnson.
- Daniel Cook - First Attorney General of Illinois.
- Basil Duke - Confederate General, took part in Morgan's Raid. Brother-in-law of John Hunt Morgan.
- William H. Hatch - politician, U.S. Representative from Missouri.
- Henry P. Haun - politician, U.S. Senator from California.
- George W. Johnson - politician, 1st Confederate Governor of Kentucky, died at the Battle of Shiloh.
- John T. Johnson - politician, U.S. Representative from Kentucky, brother of Richard M. Johnson.
- Richard M. Johnson - politician, Vice President of the United States 1837–43.
- Tom L. Johnson - U.S. Representative from Ohio 1891–95, Mayor of Cleveland 1901–1909.
- John M. Palmer - Civil War general, Governor of Illinois 1869–1873, National Democratic Party presidential candidate 1896.
- James F. Robinson - politician, 22nd Governor of Kentucky. Federal governor during the Civil War. Cardome in Georgetown was his family home.
- John M. Robinson - politician, United States Senator from Illinois.
- Robert Ward Johnson - U.S. and Confederate senator from Arkansas. Nephew of Richard M. Johnson.
- Ryan Quarles - Kentucky Commissioner of Agriculture
- Gustavus W. Smith - General in the Confederate Army during the Civil War, Confederate Secretary of War in 1862.
- Junius Ward - 19th century horseman and plantation owner, founder of Ward Hall.
- Edith Summers Kelley - Canadian author, wrote Weeds (1923), novel about "an artistic tomboy in the rural hills of Kentucky, who struggles unsuccessfully to overcome the oppressive roles assigned to her as a woman"

== Politics ==
United States presidential election results for Scott County, Kentucky
Year	Republican		Democratic		Third party(ies)	
Year	No.	%	No.	%	No.	%
1912	1,047	26.81%	2,361	60.46%	497	12.73%
1916	1,486	36.02%	2,611	63.30%	28	0.68%
1920	2,661	34.65%	4,993	65.02%	25	0.33%
1924	2,334	37.60%	3,805	61.30%	68	1.10%
1928	3,192	52.82%	2,843	47.05%	8	0.13%
1932	1,943	29.66%	4,572	69.79%	36	0.55%
1936	1,861	31.88%	3,966	67.93%	11	0.19%
1940	1,795	30.69%	4,039	69.05%	15	0.26%
1944	1,589	30.28%	3,627	69.11%	32	0.61%
1948	1,352	26.37%	3,548	69.19%	228	4.45%
1952	2,077	39.48%	3,171	60.27%	13	0.25%
1956	1,940	40.02%	2,860	58.99%	48	0.99%
1960	2,200	45.85%	2,598	54.15%	0	0.00%
1964	1,330	28.67%	3,289	70.90%	20	0.43%
1968	1,748	35.07%	1,961	39.35%	1,275	25.58%
1972	3,255	64.76%	1,642	32.67%	129	2.57%
1976	2,408	42.71%	3,118	55.30%	112	1.99%
1980	2,868	43.02%	3,531	52.96%	268	4.02%
1984	4,461	62.44%	2,606	36.48%	77	1.08%
1988	4,482	56.68%	3,380	42.74%	46	0.58%
1992	3,810	41.09%	3,639	39.24%	1,824	19.67%
1996	4,349	45.23%	4,258	44.28%	1,008	10.48%
2000	7,952	57.68%	5,472	39.69%	362	2.63%
2004	10,600	62.17%	6,325	37.10%	125	0.73%
2008	11,782	59.72%	7,712	39.09%	236	1.20%
2012	12,679	61.63%	7,532	36.61%	362	1.76%
2016	15,052	62.20%	7,715	31.88%	1,433	5.92%
2020	17,767	61.33%	10,567	36.48%	635	2.19%
2024	18,747	62.97%	10,501	35.27%	521	1.75%

The county voted "No" on 2022 Kentucky Amendment 2, an anti-abortion ballot measure, by 58% to 42%, and backed Donald Trump with 61% of the vote to Joe Biden's 36% in the 2020 presidential election.

=== Elected officials ===
Elected officials as of January 3, 2025
U.S. House	Andy Barr (R)	KY 6
Ky. Senate	Matt Nunn (R)	17
Ky. House	Tony Hampton (R)	62
Ky. House	Vanessa Grossl (R)	88

== See also ==
- National Register of Historic Places listings in Scott County, Kentucky
