= List of historic houses in Kentucky =

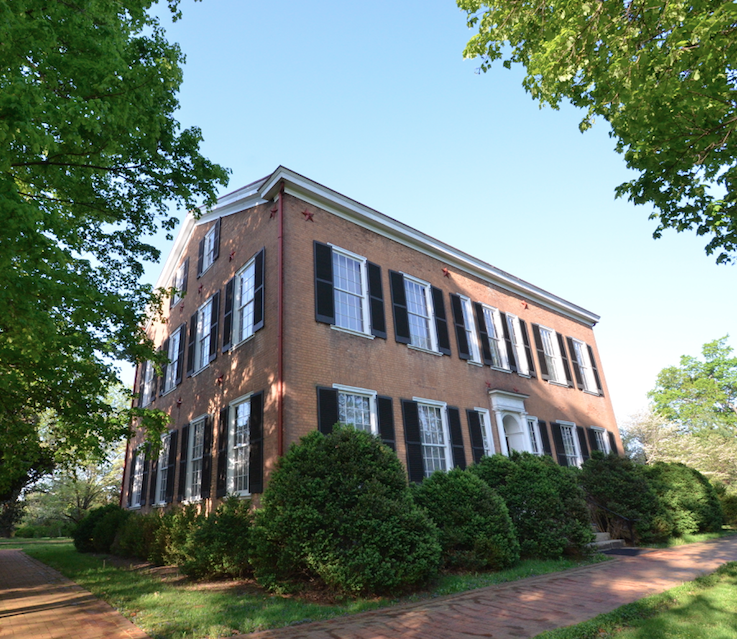
Federal Hill Mansion

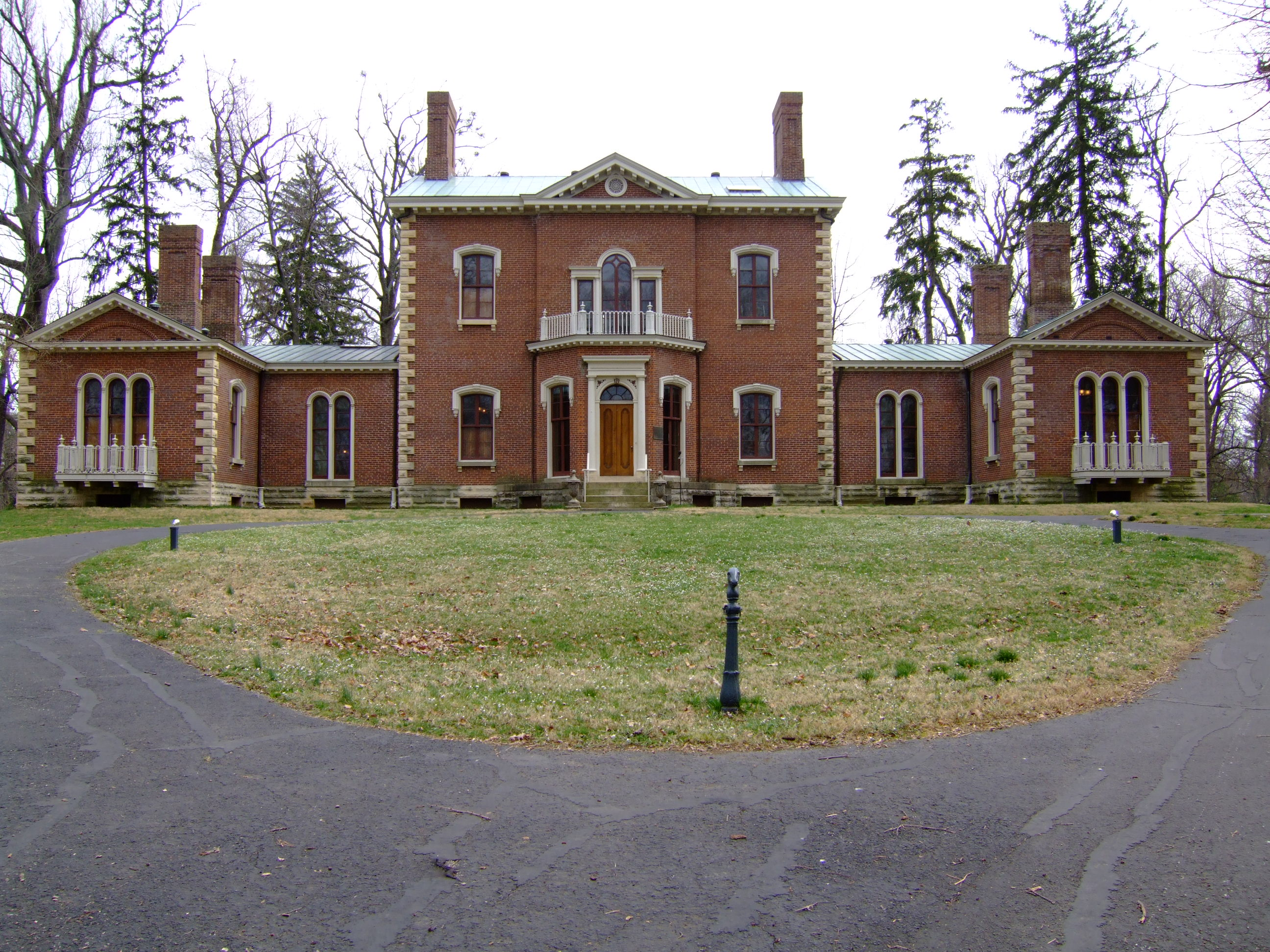
Ashland

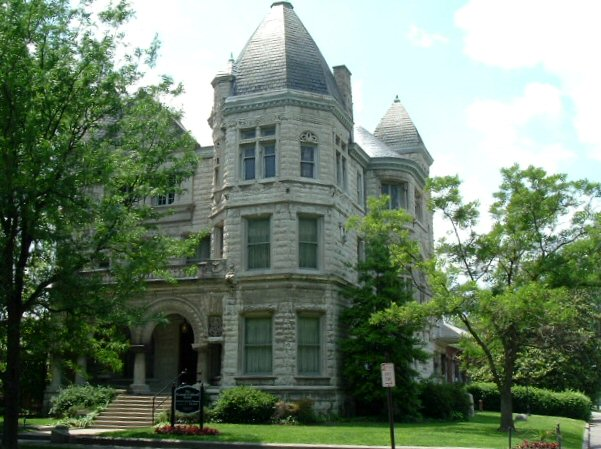
Conrad-Caldwell House

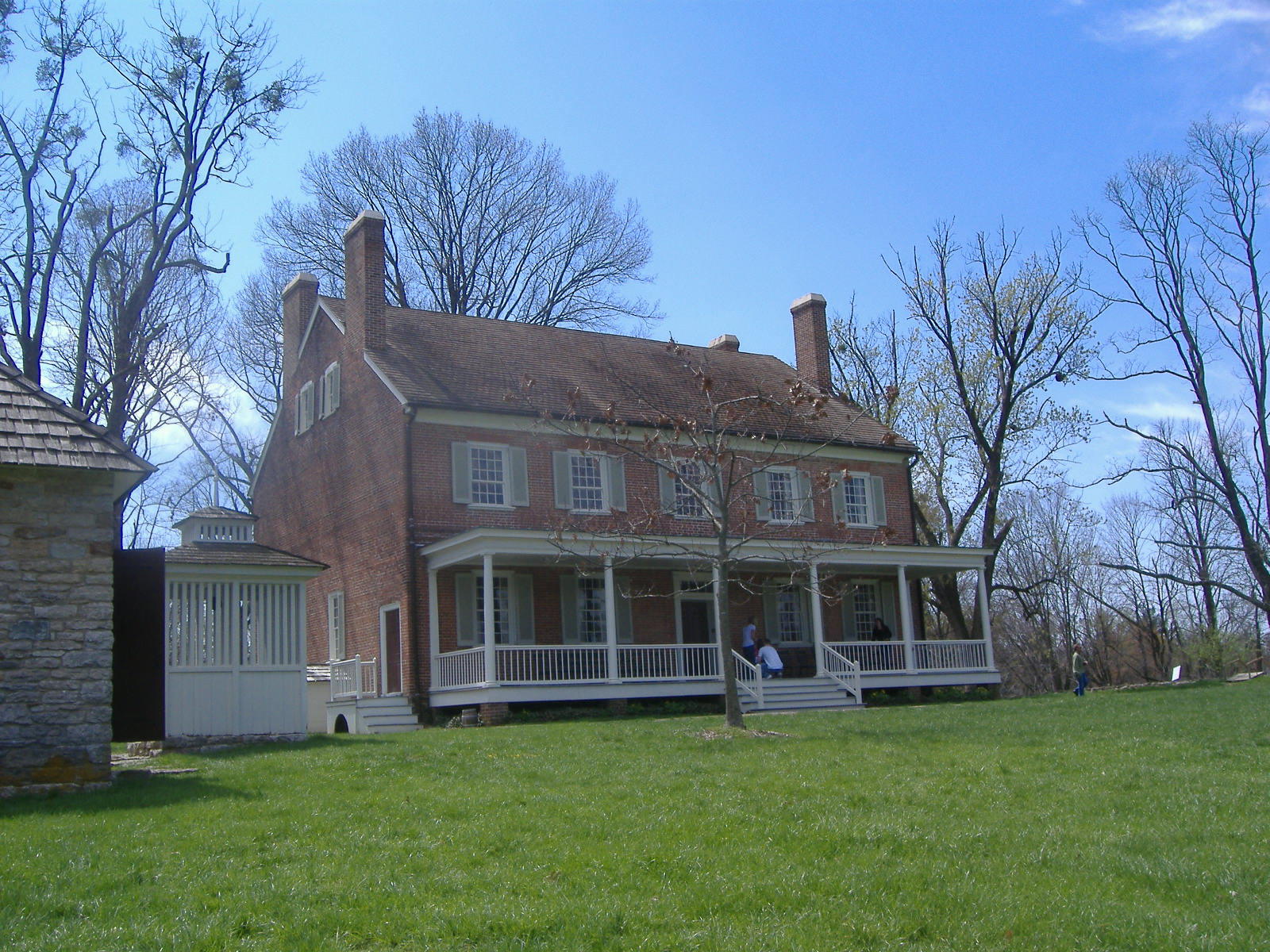
Croghan Mansion

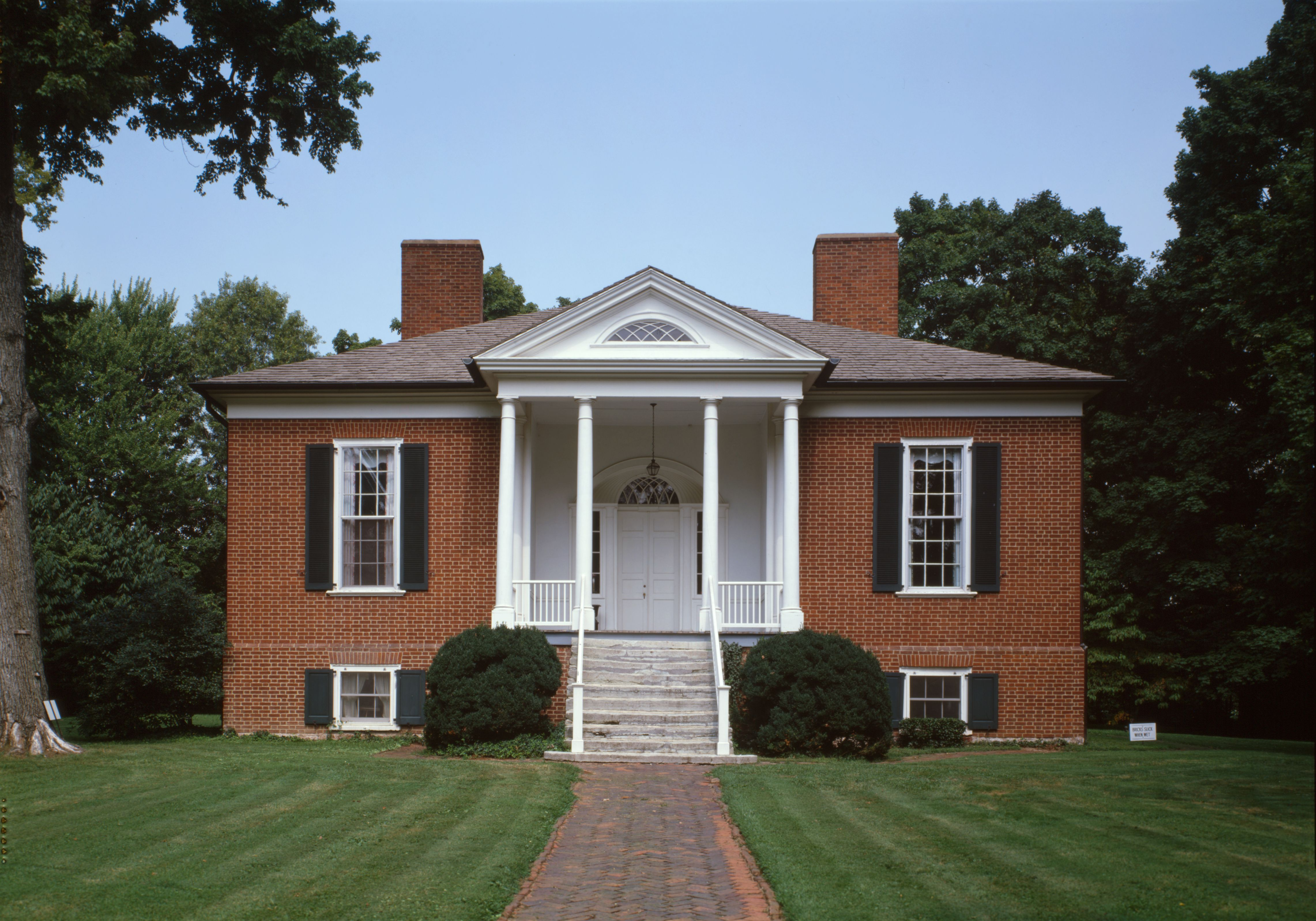
Farmington

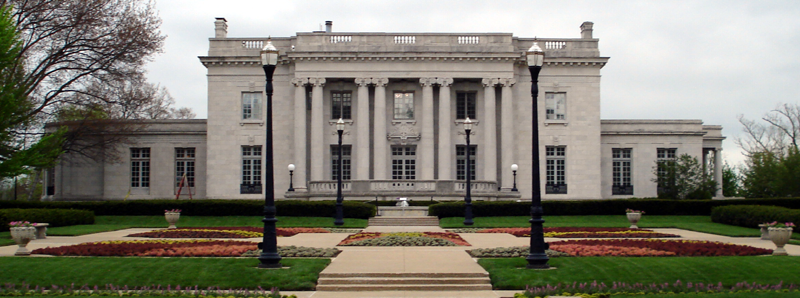
Kentucky Governor's Mansion

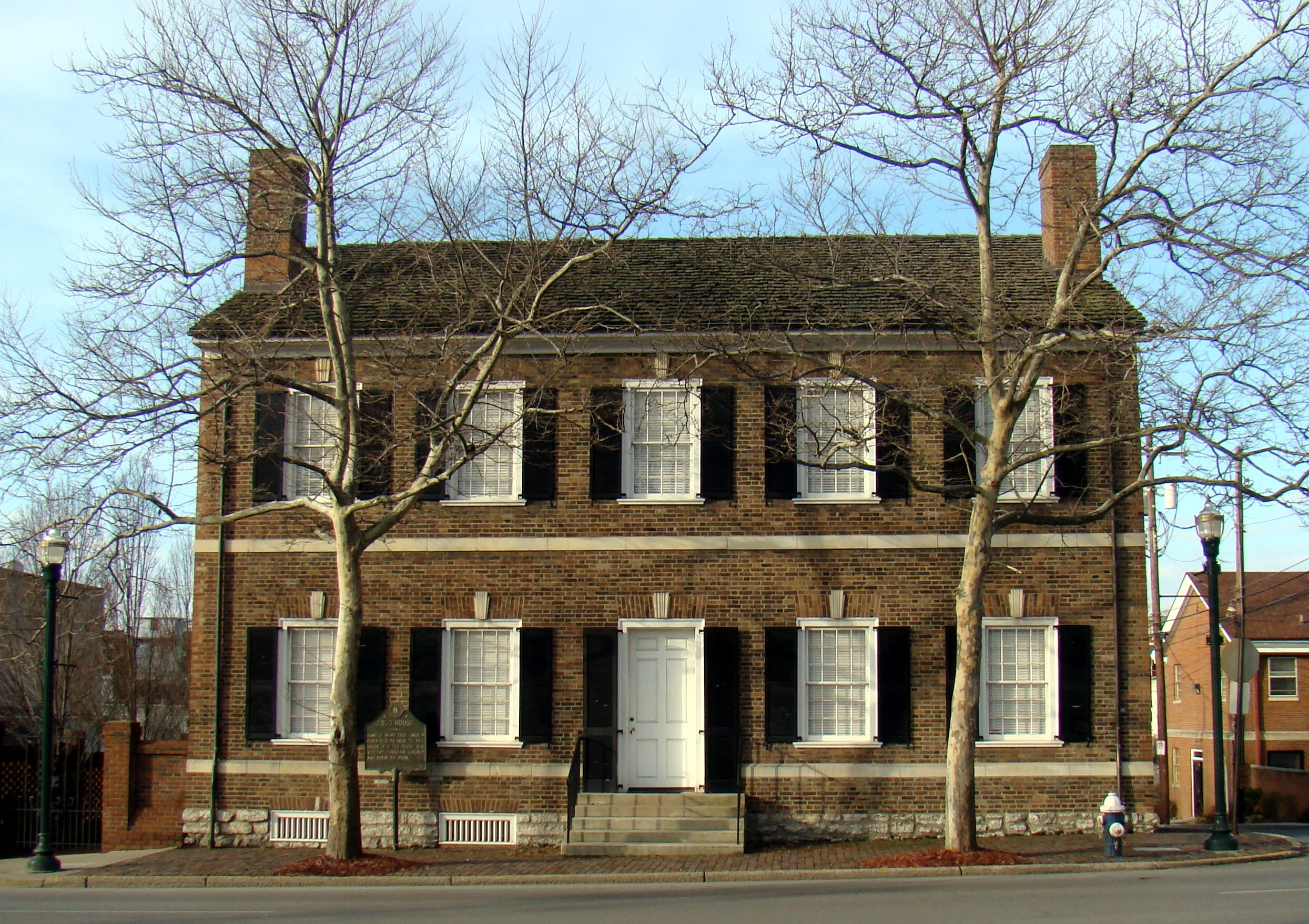
Mary Todd Lincoln House

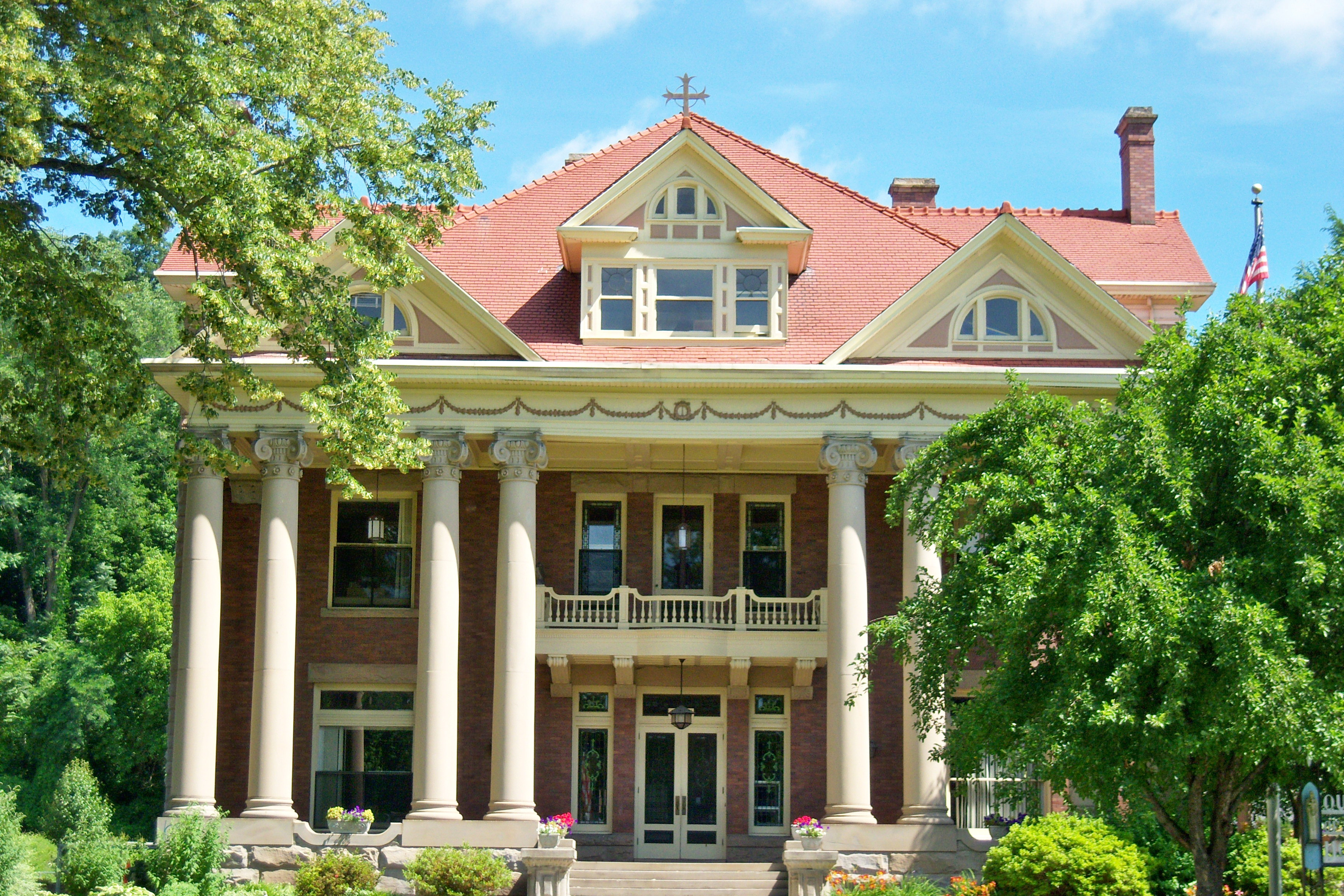
Mayo Mansion

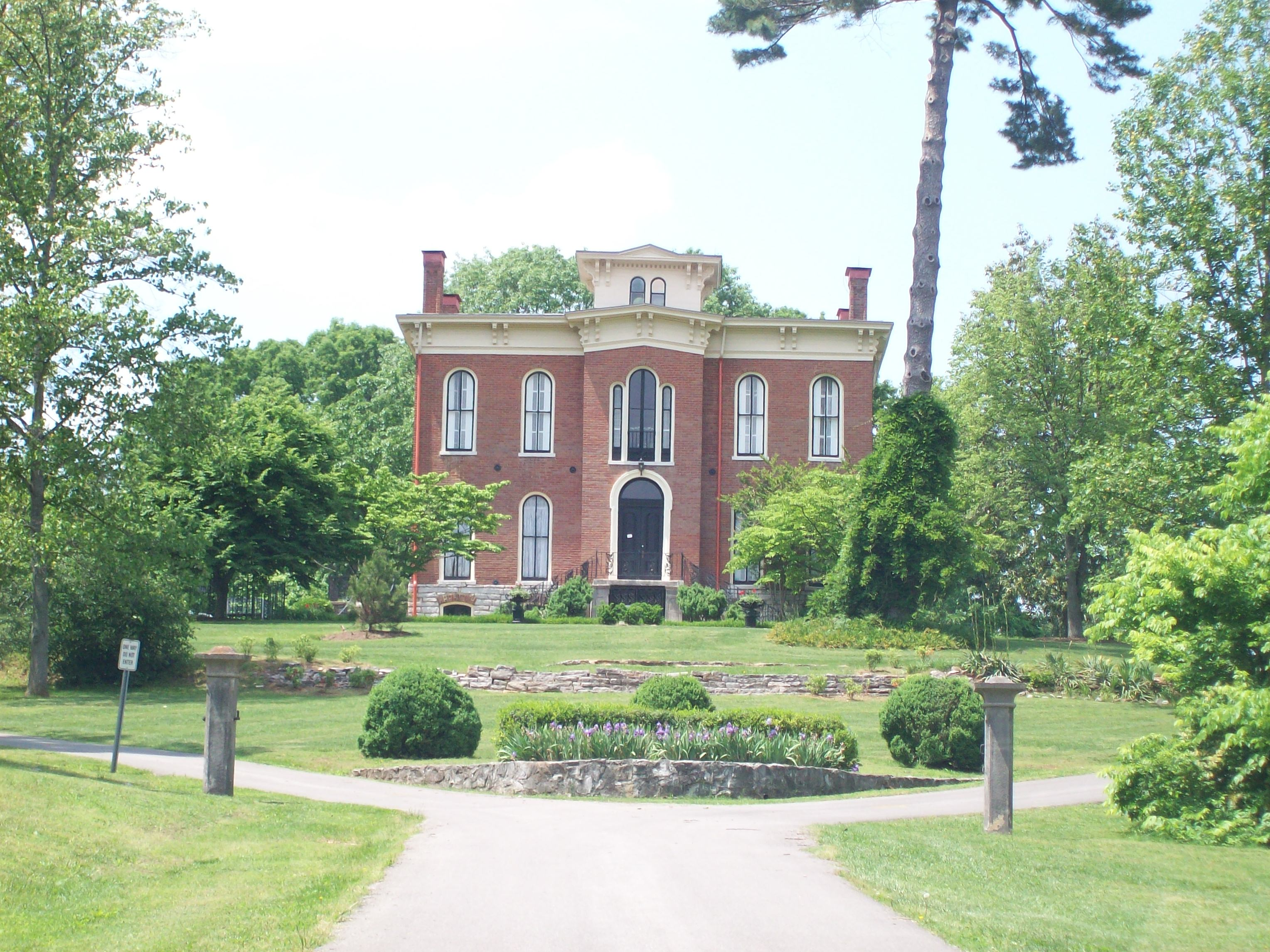
Riverview at Hobson Grove

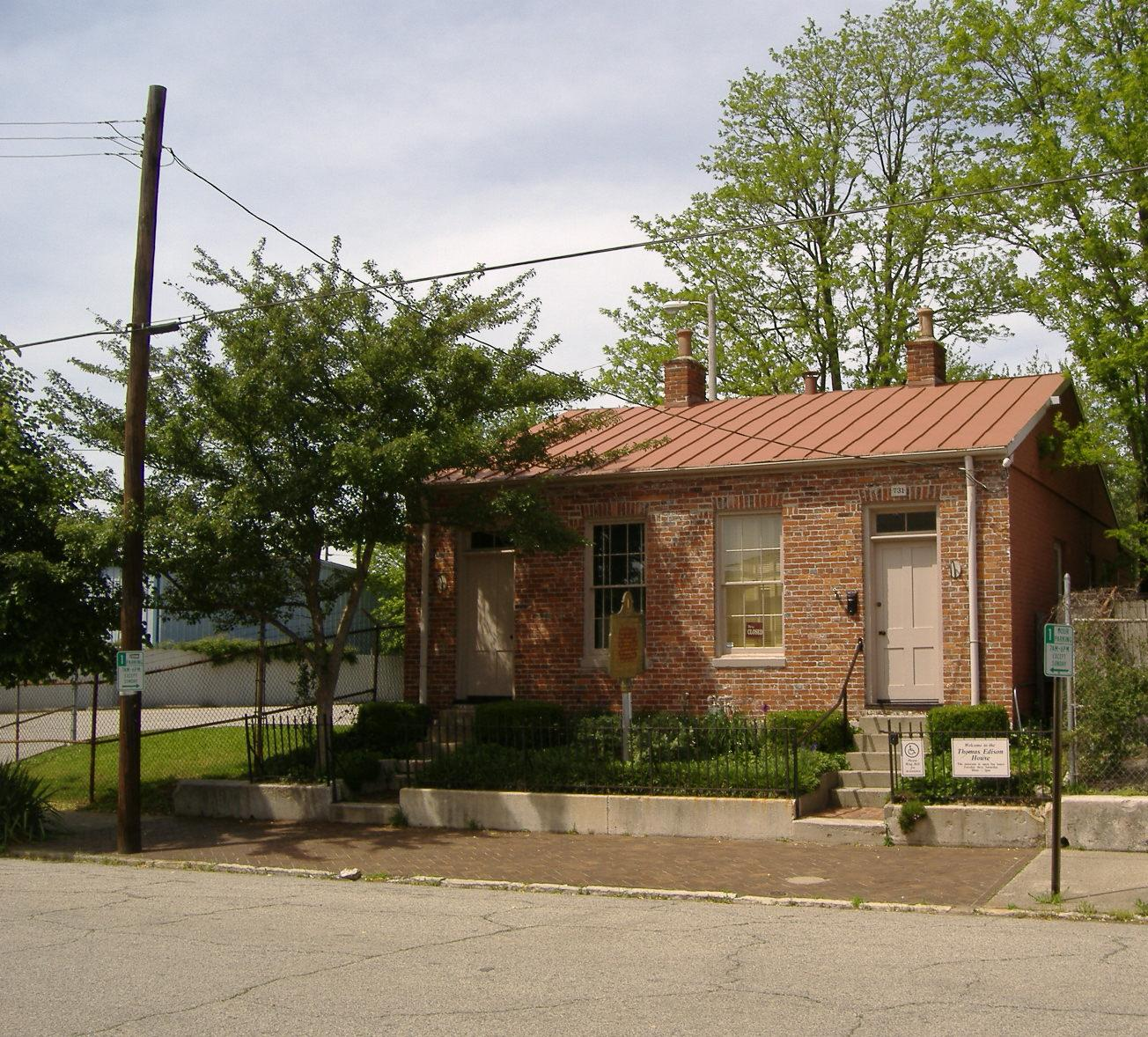
Thomas Edison House

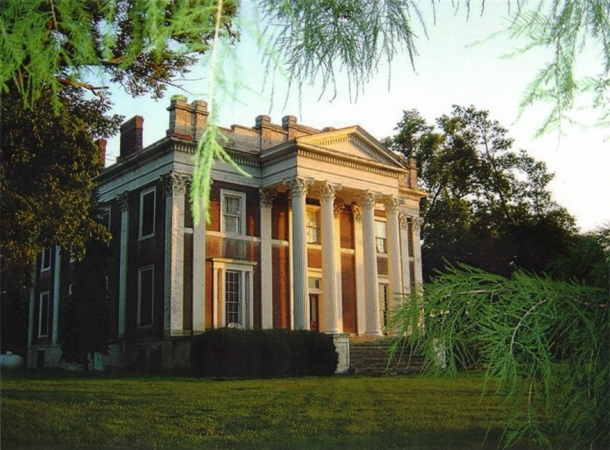
Ward Hall

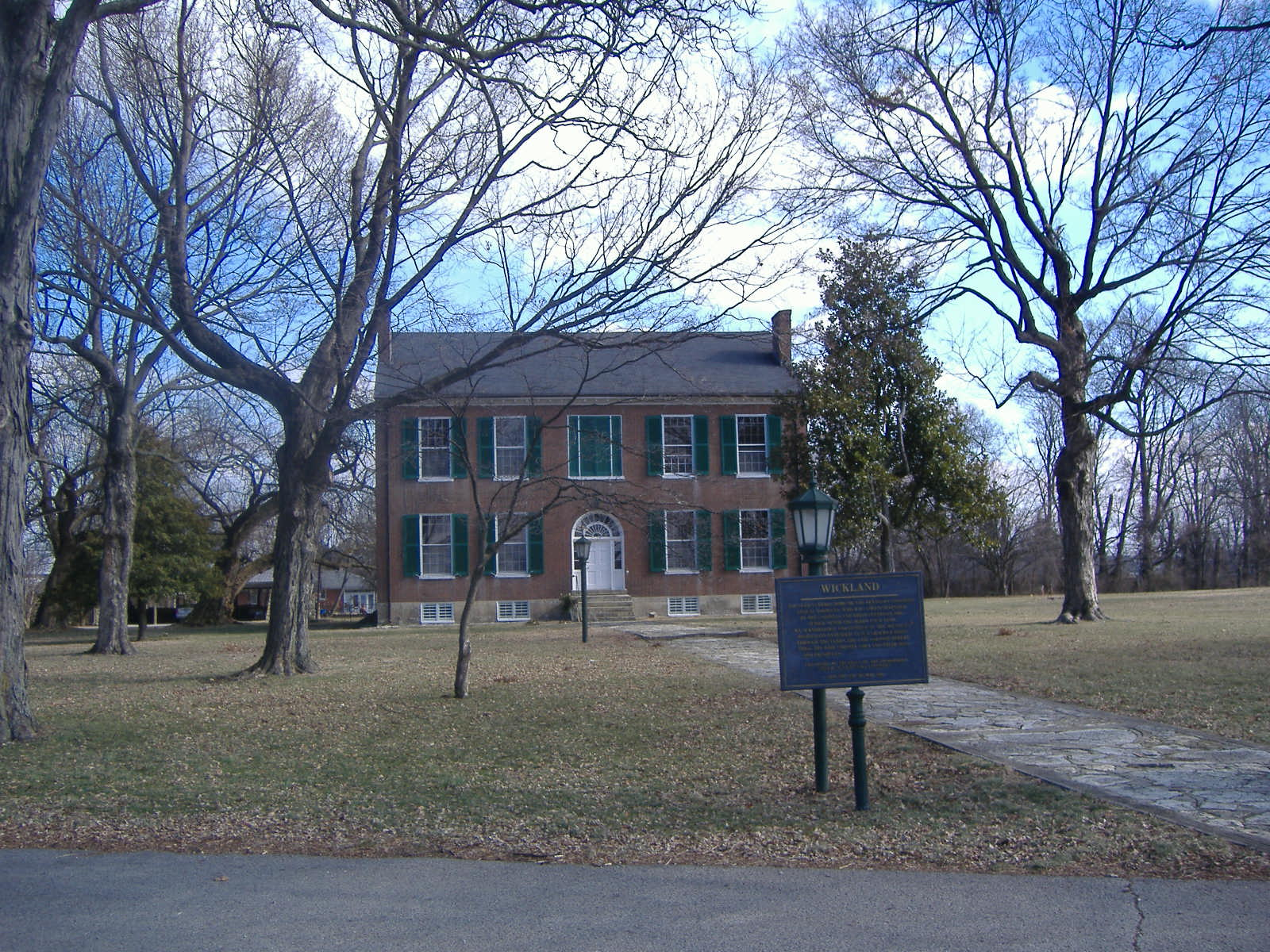
Wickland (Bardstown)

This is an alphabetical list of historic houses in the U.S. state of Kentucky.

== List of historic houses in Kentucky ==
Listing includes date of the start of construction:

- Abner Gaines House (Walton) – Federal-style house; built 1814
- Allenhurst (Scott County) – Greek Revival style mansion designed by Thomas Lewinski; built 1850
- Audubon (Scott County) – Greek Revival style house; built 1829
- Ashland (Lexington) – Estate of American statesmen Henry Clay; built c. 1806
- Beeches (Frankfort) – Federal-style house; built 1800
- Ben Johnson House (Bardstown) – Home of Lieutenant Governor William Johnson and his son Ben Johnson; built 1851
- Berry Mansion (Frankfort) – Colonial Revival style house; built 1900
- Boxhill (Glenview) – Georgian Revival style mansion; built c. 1906
- Branham House (Georgetown) – Part of South Broadway Neighborhood District; built 1795
- Bullock-Clifton House (Louisville) – Federal-style farmhouse. Oldest surviving wood-frame structure in Jefferson County; built 1834
- Carneal House (Covington) – Oldest house in the city. Constructed by Thomas D. Carneal, one of Covington's founders; built 1815
- Catlett House/Beechmoor (Catlettsburg) – Home of Alexander and Horatio Catlett, founders of Catlettsburg; built 1812
- Colson House (Middlesboro) – Oldest remaining house in Bell County; built 1800
- Conrad-Caldwell House (Louisville) – Richardsonian-style mansion located within the St. James-Belgravia Historic District; built 1893
- Dillon Asher Cabin (Clay County, Kentucky); built 1799
- Croghan Mansion (Louisville) – Home of George Rogers Clark and his sister, Lucy Clark Croghan. Remains the only residence still in existence west of the Appalachian Mountains to have sheltered Louis and Clark; built c. 1790
- D. W. Griffith House (La Grange) – Home of movie director D. W. Griffith; built 1905
- Daniel Carter Beard Boyhood Home (Covington) – Home of Daniel Carter Beard, a founder of Boy Scouts of America; built 1821
- Dinsmore Homestead (Boone County) – Greek Revival and Federal-style home; built 1841
- Elijah Herndon House (California) – Federal-style home; built 1818
- Elkwood (Georgetown) – built 1810
- Farmington (Louisville) – Home of James Speed, 27th U.S. Attorney General. Based on plans by Thomas Jefferson; built 1815
- Federal Hill (Bardstown) – Home of senator John Rowan. Served as Stephen Foster's inspiration for the song My Old Kentucky Home; built 1795
- Fielding Bradford House (Scott County)
- Foster Sanford House, aka Lady Burlington (Burlington, Kentucky) – Grand Federal Style with Greek Revival c. 1831
- Francis M. Stafford House (Paintsville) – Home of John Stafford, a founder of Paintsville. Oldest surviving house in Johnson County; built 1843
- Fryer House (Butler) – Home of pioneer Walter Fryer; built 1811
- Glen Willis (Frankfort) – built 1815
- Hausgen House (Anchorage) – Colonial Revival style house; built c. 1890
- Hawkins House (Georgetown) – Has served as a ropewalk and a dormitory for the Georgetown Female Seminary. Became a residential home in 1858; built c. 1790
- Hikes-Hunsinger House (Louisville) – Federal-style residence; built 1824
- Hunt-Morgan House (Lexington) – Home of John Wesley Hunt, the first millionaire west of the Allegheny Mountains and John Hunt Morgan. Birthplace of Thomas Hunt Morgan, the only Kentuckian to be awarded a Nobel Prize; built 1814
- Hurricane Hall (Fayette County) – built 1794
- Jacob Eversole Cabin (Perry County) – built ca 1789–1804, the oldest remaining building in Eastern Kentucky
- James M. Lloyd House (Mount Washington) – Italianate and Late Victorian style residence; built c. 1880
- Jesse R. Zeigler House (Frankfort) – Only building designed by Frank Lloyd Wright in Kentucky; built 1910
- John Andrew Miller House (Scott County) – Home of pioneer John Andrew Miller. Served as a community shelter from Native American attacks; built 1785
- Johnston-Jacobs House (Georgetown) – Greek Revival style brick home; built 1795
- John Tanner House (Petersburg) – Oldest surviving home in Boone County; built 1810
- Julius Blackburn House (Scott County) – Home to American Revolutionary War veteran Julius Blackburn; built 1799
- Kentucky Governor's Mansion (Frankfort) – Beaux-Arts style residence for the Governor of Kentucky; built 1912
- Landward House (Louisville) – Brick Italianate mansion; built 1871
- Liberty Hall (Frankfort) – Home to many notable Americans including John Brown and Margaret Wise Brown; built 1796
- Lincliff (Glenview) – Georgian Revival mansion; built 1911
- Lloyd Tilghman House (Paducah) – Home of Lloyd Tilghman; built 1852
- Longview Farm House (Adairville) – A Italianate and Greek Revival style home; built 1851
- Martin Castle (Fayette County) – European-inspired castle built by Rex and Caroline Martin. Currently serves as a hotel; built 1969
- Mary Todd Lincoln House (Lexington) – Home of former first lady, Mary Todd Lincoln; built c. 1803
- Mayo Mansion (Ashland) – A Beaux-Arts architecture mansion built in 1917 by Alice Jane Mayo
- Mayo Mansion (Paintsville) – Home of John C. C. Mayo; built 1905
- McClure-Shelby House (Jessamine County) – Greek Revival and Federal style residence; built 1840
- McConnell House (Greenup County) – Federal, Georgian and Greek Revival style residence; built in 1834
- Milliken Memorial Community House (Elkton) – First privately donated community house in the United States; built 1928
- Millspring (Georgetown) – Home of Elijah Craig, founder of Georgetown; built 1789
- Moses Tyler Stone Cottage (Louisville) – Home of Moses Tyler; built 1795
- Old Governor's Mansion (Frankfort) – Currently serves as the official residence of the Lieutenant Governor of Kentucky. Serves as the oldest executive residence still in use in the United States; built 1796
- Orlando Brown House (Frankfort) – Greek Revival style home designed by Gideon Shryock, designer of the Kentucky State Capitol; built 1835
- Payne-Desha House (Georgetown) – Home of Robert Payne, a war hero from the Battle of the Thames; built 1814
- Peterson-Dumesnil House (Louisville) – Victorian-Italianate mansion; built c. 1869
- Pope Villa (Lexington) – Home of former John Pope, designed by Benjamin Henry Latrobe, architect of the U.S. Capitol Building; built 1811
- Presley Tyler Farm House (Louisville) – Georgian-Federalist Style House; built c. 1844
- Farnsley-Moremen House (Louisville) – Brick I-house with a two-story Greek Revival portico; built 1837
- Riverview at Hobson Grove (Bowling Green) – Italianate-style mansion; built c. 1850s
- Rob Morris Home (La Grange) – Home of Rob Morris, the second and last poet laureate of Freemasonry and the founder of the Order of the Eastern Star.
- Ronald-Brennan House (Louisville) – Italianate-style townhouse; built 1868
- Rose Hill (Louisville) – Antebellum-style residence; built 1852
- Samuel May House (Prestonsburg) – Home of former state senator and representative, Samuel May, built 1816
- Shropshire House (Georgetown) – Home of Confederate governor of Kentucky, George W. Johnson; built 1814
- Thomas Edison House (Louisville) – Home of Thomas Edison from 1866 to 1867; built c. 1850s
- Thomas Huey Farm (Big Bone) – Gothic Revival style home; built 1865
- Ward Hall (Georgetown) – Home of Junius and Matilda Viley Ward, built circa 1857
- Waveland (Danville) – Home of Willis Green, built 1797
- Waveland State Historic Site (Lexington) – Greek Revival home of Joseph Bryan, built 1844
- White Hall (Richmond) – Home of Cassius Marcellus Clay, cousin of Henry Clay; built 1799
- Wickland (Bardstown) – Home of two governors of Kentucky and one Governor of Louisiana; built 1813
- Wickland (Shelbyville) – Classical Revival mansion; built 1901
- Whitney Young Birthplace and Museum (Shelby County) – Birthplace of Whitney Young, an American civil rights leader; built 1921
- William Forst House (Russellville) – Site at which the Confederate government of Kentucky was formed; built 1820
- William Hickman House (Winchester, Kentucky) – Federal-style home; built 1814
- Wooldridge-Rose House (Pewee Valley) – Colonial Revival style residence; built 1905
- Zachary Taylor House (Louisville) – Boyhood home of 12th President, Zachary Taylor; built 1790

== See also ==
- List of National Historic Landmarks in Kentucky
- List of Registered Historic Places in Kentucky
- Oldest buildings in the United States
