= List of the oldest buildings in Kentucky =

List of old buildings in Kentucky

This article lists the oldest extant buildings in Kentucky, including extant buildings and structures constructed prior to and during the United States rule over Kentucky. Only buildings built prior to 1840 are suitable for inclusion on this list, or the building must be the oldest of its type.

In order to qualify for the list, a structure must:

- be a recognizable building (defined as any human-made structure used or intended for supporting or sheltering any use or continuous occupancy);
- incorporate features of building work from the claimed date to at least 1.5 metres (4.9 ft) in height and/or be a listed building.

This consciously excludes ruins of limited height, roads and statues. Bridges may be included if they otherwise fulfill the above criteria. Dates for many of the oldest structures have been arrived at by radiocarbon dating or dendrochronology and should be considered approximate. If the exact year of initial construction is estimated, it will be shown as a range of dates.

== List of oldest buildings ==
Building	Image	Location	First built	Use	Notes
Old Talbott Tavern		Bardstown, Kentucky	1779	Hotel	"Oldest western stagecoach stop still in operation."
Adam Rankin House		Lexington, Kentucky	1784	Residence	Oldest house in Lexington, although moved from its original foundation. Oldest part was built as a log house and then later covered with clapboards. It was the home to a Presbyterian minister, Rev. Adam Rankin.
John Andrew Miller House		Scott County, Kentucky	1785	Residence	Stone home of pioneer John Andrew Miller. Served as a community shelter from Native American attacks
Israel Grant Cabin		Scott County, Kentucky	ca. 1787	Residence	Early log cabin
William Whitley House State Historic Site		Crab Orchard, Kentucky	1787–1794	Residence	Oldest brick house in Kentucky
Millspring		Georgetown, Kentucky	1789	Residence	Back ell is the oldest part of the house, constructed by Rev. Elijah Craig
Jacob Eversole Cabin		Perry County, Kentucky	ca. 1789–1804	Residence	Oldest house in eastern Kentucky
Zachary Taylor House		Louisville, Kentucky	1790	Residence	Childhood home of President Zachary Taylor
Cane Ridge Meeting House		Cane Ridge, Kentucky	1791	Church	Likely oldest church building in Kentucky
Historic Locust Grove		Louisville, Kentucky	1792	Residence	Visited by explorers Lewis and Clark and President Zachary Taylor
Old Providence Church		Winchester, Kentucky	1793	Church	Oldest stone church in Kentucky
Abraham Barton House		Lexington, Kentucky	1795	Residence	Constructed for Kentucky politician Peyton Short, later owned by Confederate soldier Henry Brainerd McClellan
Daniel Boone Cabin		Carlisle, Kentucky	1795	Residence	Last Kentucky cabin of Daniel Boone
Richard Masterson House		Carrollton, Kentucky	ca. 1795	Residence	Early Methodist services were held in house as well. Oldest two story brick building in state.
White Hall		Richmond, Kentucky	1799	Residence	Home of Green Clay and Cassius Marcellus Clay
Bates Log House		Lexington, Kentucky	ca. 1800	Residence	Added to the National Register of Historic Places in 1982
Oldest House		Bell County, Kentucky	1800	Residence	Oldest house in Bell County.
Henry Clay's Law Office		Lexington, Kentucky	1803	Office	Building where Henry Clay ran his law services
Waggoner/Langdon/Colyer House		Pulaski County, Kentucky	1805	Residence	Pulaski 1805 log house is one of oldest extant log houses in Pulaski County
Ashland		Lexington, Kentucky	1811	Residence	Home of Kentucky politician Henry Clay
Cane Springs Primitive Baptist Church		College Hill, Kentucky	ca. 1812–13	Church	Built during the Great Awakening, oldest church building in Madison County
J. B. Knight House		Hopkinsville, Kentucky	ca. 1815–1820	Residence	The Knight House is the oldest standing structure and residence in Hopkinsville and Christian County Kentucky.
Squire Earick House		Louisville, Kentucky	1815	Residence	Oldest woodframe house in Louisville
Carneal House		Covington, Kentucky	1815	Residence	Oldest building in Covington
Elijah Herndon House		California, Kentucky	1818	Residence	Home of Elijah Herndon, a Kentucky slaveowner
Cleveland-Rogers House		Lexington, Kentucky	1819	Residence	Placed on the National Register of Historic Places in 1980
Chenault House		Richmond, Kentucky	1830	Residence	Estate built by William Chenault in 1830, known for derby parties in the 20th century

== See also ==
- National Register of Historic Places listings in Kentucky
- History of Kentucky
- Oldest buildings in the United States
