= Herndon House (disambiguation) =

The Herndon House was a hotel in Omaha, Nebraska.

Herndon House or Herndon Home may also refer to:

- Elijah Herndon House, a house in California, Kentucky
- Herndon Home, a house in Atlanta, Georgia
- Herndon Homes, a former housing project in Atlanta
