= Carthage, Kentucky =

Unincorporated community in Kentucky, United States

- Unincorporated community
- Location within Kentucky
- Coordinates: 38°56′08″N 84°18′26″W
- Country: United States
- State: Kentucky
- County: Campbell
- Elevation: 853 ft (260 m)
- Time zone: UTC-5 (Eastern (EST))
  - Summer (DST): UTC-4 (EDT)
- Area code: 859
- GNIS feature ID: 489025

Carthage is an unincorporated community in Campbell County, Kentucky, United States. Carthage is located near Kentucky Route 9, 2.5 miles (4.0 km) west-northwest of California.
