= Old Providence Church =

Historic church in Kentucky, United States

- Providence Baptist Church
- U.S. National Register of Historic Places
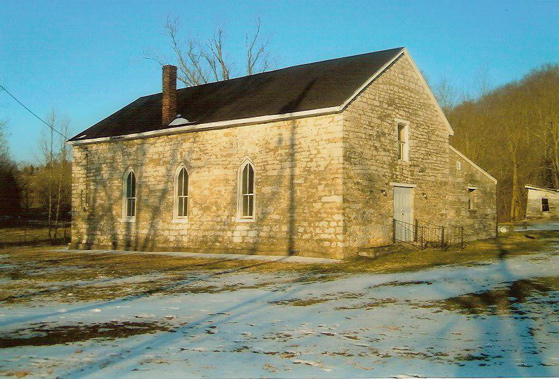
- Old Providence Church (Winchester, KY)

- Location within Kentucky Location within the United States
- Nearest city: Winchester, Kentucky
- Coordinates: 37°56′15″N 84°14′45″W
- Built: 1793
- NRHP reference No.: 76000864
- Added to NRHP: May 13, 1976

The Old Providence Church is located off New Boonesboro Road in Winchester, Clark County, Kentucky, United States. Constructed of stone, the building was built in the late eighteenth century.

Among the members of the church was Daniel Boone, and two of his family members — Samuel and Mary — were baptized there. Once named Howard's Creek Church, it was renamed Old Providence Church in 1790. A "United Baptist" organization was founded at the church in 1801. The building was passed to the Negro Baptists in 1870; it was slightly damaged in a fire and restored in 1949.

== See also ==
- List of the oldest buildings in Kentucky
