= Mary Hissem De Moss =

American singer

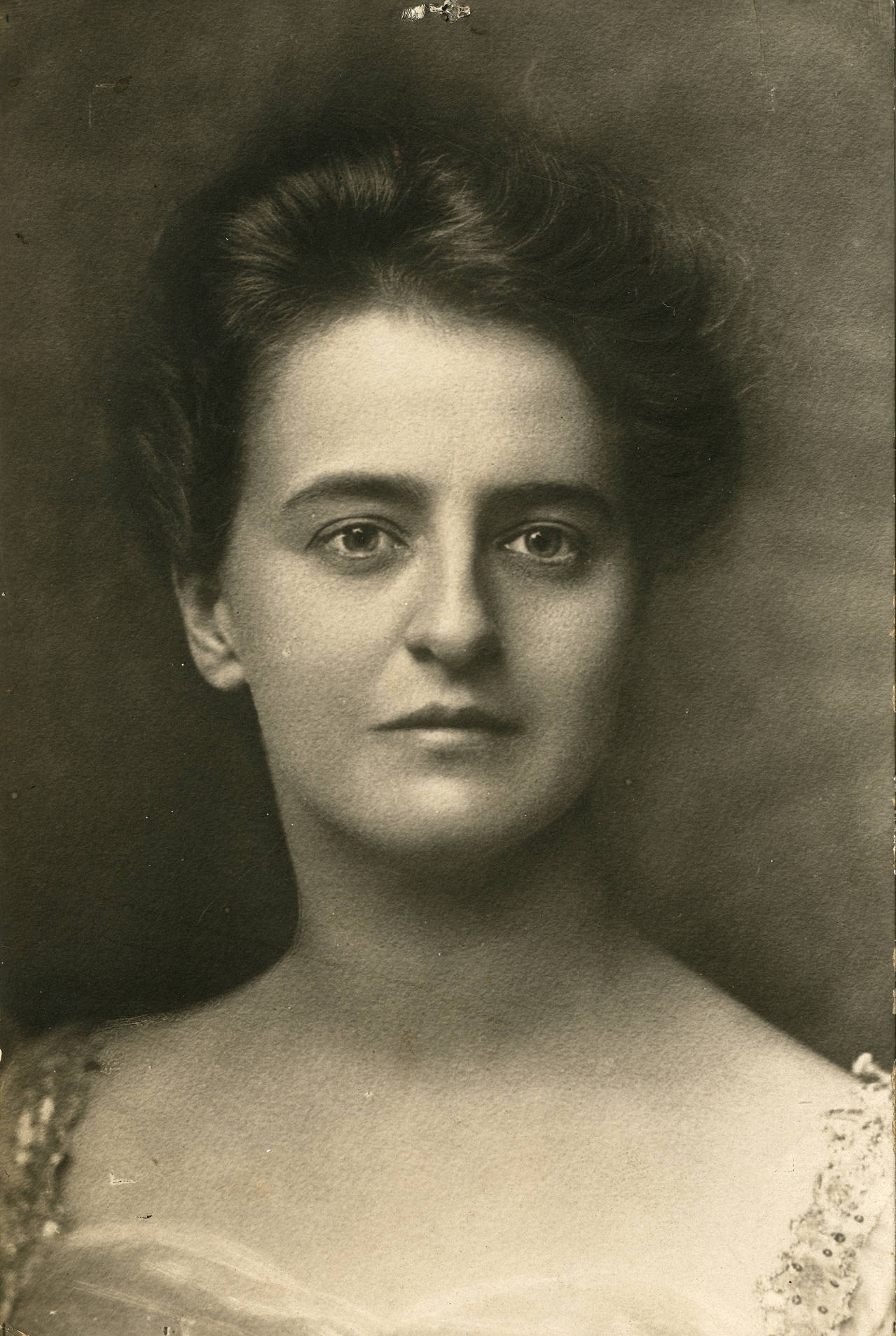
- Mary Hissem De Moss in 1909
- Born: July 27, 1871; California, Kentucky
- Died: August 23, 1960 (age 89); Montclair, New Jersey
- Other name: Mary Lyon
- Occupation: Singer

Mary Hissem De Moss Lyon (July 27, 1871 – August 23, 1960) was an American concert and oratorio singer, based in New York, and known as the "Festival Soprano" for her many appearances at music festivals across the United States and Canada.

== Early life ==
Mary "Mamie" Hissem was born in California, Kentucky and raised in New Richmond, Ohio, the daughter of Martin Luther Hissem and Rachel Galloway Hissem. Her father and brother were steamboat captains on the Ohio River. She studied voice at the Cincinnati Conservatory of Music.

== Career ==
Hissem, a soprano, was a church soloist in Cincinnati and in New York City. She toured as a soloist with the New York Symphony Orchestra, conducted by Walter Damrosch. She was a guest soloist with the Boston Symphony Orchestra in 1906, 1909, and 1910. She sang at Carnegie Hall more than a dozen times between 1900 and 1908, and sang at Carnegie Music Hall in Pittsburgh in 1902, 1904, and 1912. She was known as the "Festival Soprano" for her many appearances at music festivals, including the Worcester Music Festival, the Muncie Festival of Music, the Cincinnati May Festival, the Louisville May Festival, and the Bethlehem Bach Festival. She also sang on radio broadcasts, and made recordings.

== Personal life ==
Hissem married newspaper writer Lacy M. De Moss in 1894. After Lacy De Moss died in 1934, she married again, to singer Frederick D. Lyon; he died in 1952. She died in 1960, at the age of 89, at a nursing home in Montclair, New Jersey.
