= Millspring =

Historic house in Georgetown, Kentucky

Coordinates: 38°12′52.0″N 84°33′37.1″W

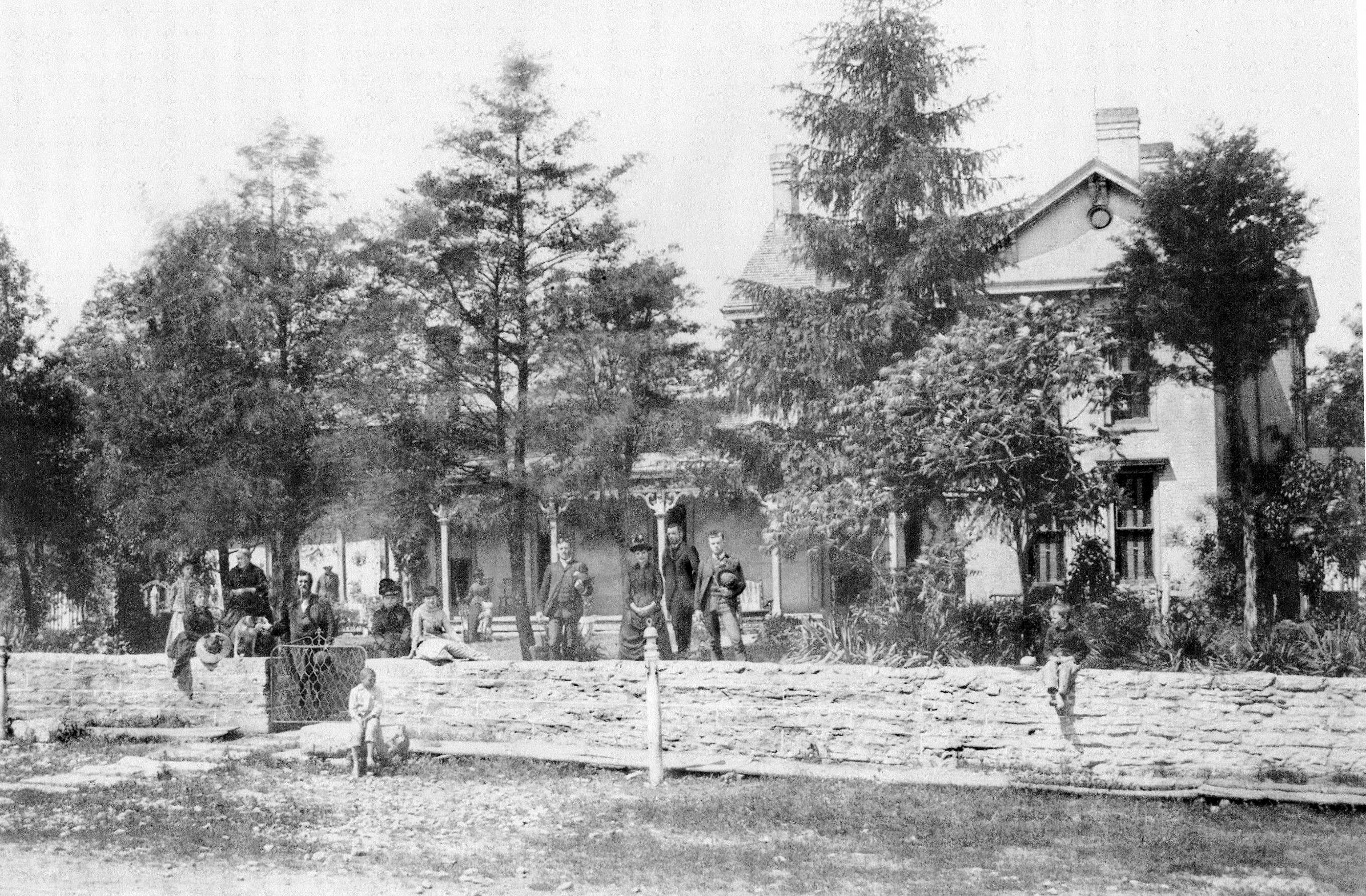
Vintage Photo of Millspring, date unknown.

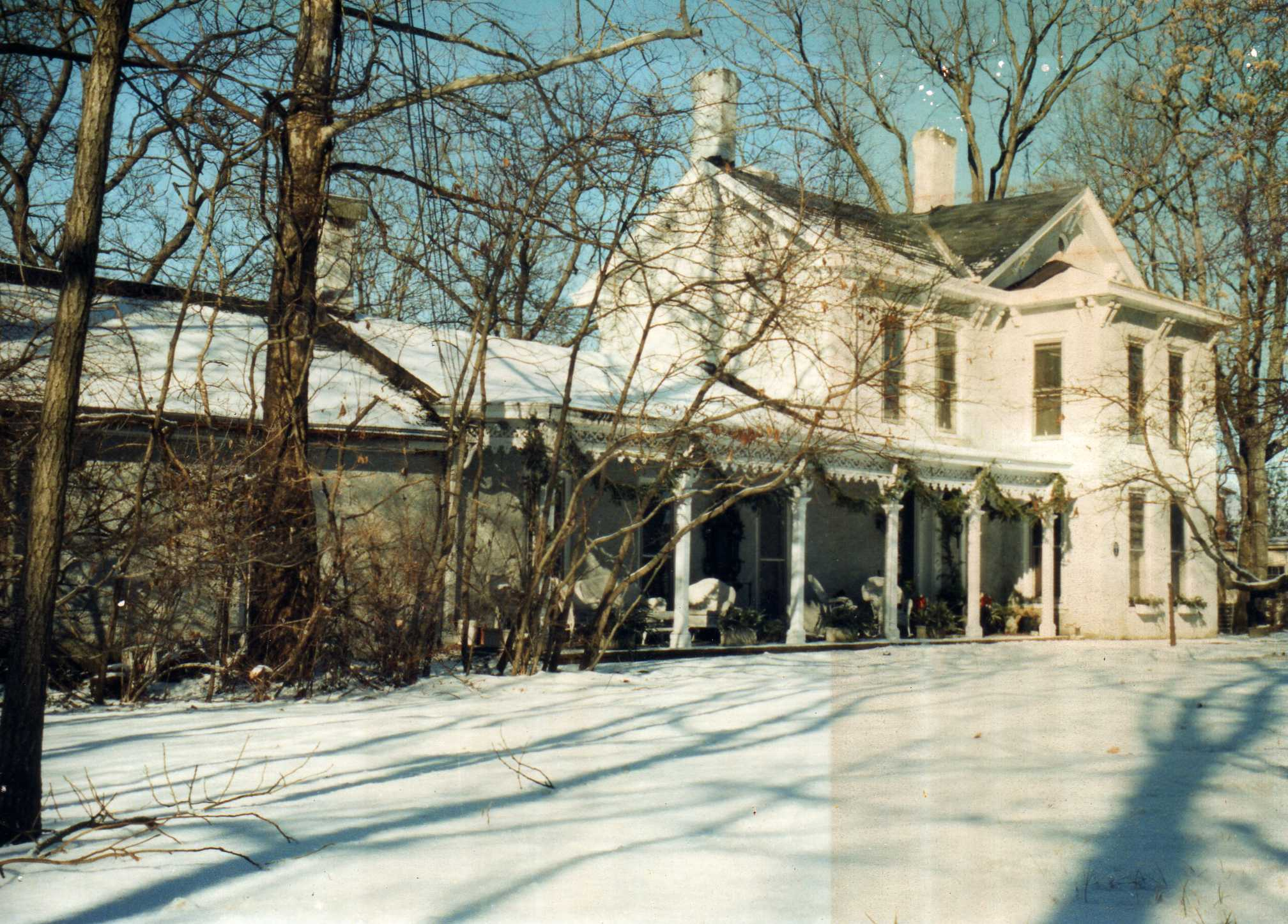
Present-day Millspring

Millspring is an historic house in Georgetown, Kentucky. It is the last remaining building situated on the original 27-acre (110,000 m^{2}) tract patented by the Rev. Elijah Craig (ca. 1740–1808), founder of Georgetown, as the first industrial park west of the Alleghenies. It was also the site of the first papermill in the region and one of the first production sites for Kentucky Bourbon.

The ell of the present structure, a small Georgian house, was constructed in 1789 by Craig. The two-story section was constructed by Gen. Richard M. Gano in 1812. While the ell originally faced the Royal Spring Branch, and the two-story section faced north, it was reoriented later to face North Broadway (Cincinnati Pike) and remodeled in the popular bracketed style by Hiram E. Stedman ca. 1860. The older sections of the house retain the original ash floors, paneled doors, paneled cupboards on the side of the fireplaces and original mantels in Kentucky Georgian and Federal style.

After Craig's death the house passed to his son-in-law, Samuel Grant, who was killed by Indians. Afterward the house was purchased by Gano, who commanded a regiment at the Battle of the Thames, and who—in collaboration with his brother-in-law—developed the city of Covington, Kentucky. At Gano's death, the property passed to Dr. Wm. H. Richardson, first professor of obstetrics and Dean of Transylvania Medical School, who brought the paper-making Stedman family to Georgetown.

== See also ==
- List of the oldest buildings in Kentucky
