= John Andrew Miller House =

Historic house in Kentucky, United States

- U.S. National Register of Historic Places
- Location within Kentucky Location within the United States
- Nearest city: Georgetown, Kentucky
- Coordinates: 38°13′21″N 84°29′58″W
- Built: 1785
- NRHP reference No.: 77000644
- Added to NRHP: November 9, 1977

The John Andrew Miller House is a stone house built by an early Kentucky settler in the eastern area of Scott County, Kentucky when it was still a part of Virginia. The house is located off of Paris Pike between the city of Georgetown and the town of Newtown. The property was added to the U.S. National Register of Historic Places on November 9, 1977.

== History ==
The central area of Kentucky was settled by frontiersmen that received land grants as payment for their military service. In the early days in Kentucky, the area was dangerous because the settlers were frequently attacked by Native Americans that used the land as a buffalo hunting ground.

In 1775, John Andrew Miller settled in Kentucky and by 1785 had built a sturdy house on 1,000 acres (4.0 km^{2}) of land in an area now called Scott County, Kentucky. Miller sold the house and 550 acres (2.2 km^{2}) of land in 1809 to Jeremiah Tarleton, a new settler from Maryland. William C. Graves bought the property from Tarleton's estate in 1833.

== Architecture ==
The John Andrew Miller House was constructed with strong materials to provide protection from attacks by Native Americans that occurred in the frontier areas of Virginia. The rugged doors were made of "6 panels on the outside and bias batten on the inside".

== See also ==
- List of the oldest buildings in Kentucky
