= Longview Farm House =

Historic house in Kentucky, United States

- U.S. National Register of Historic Places
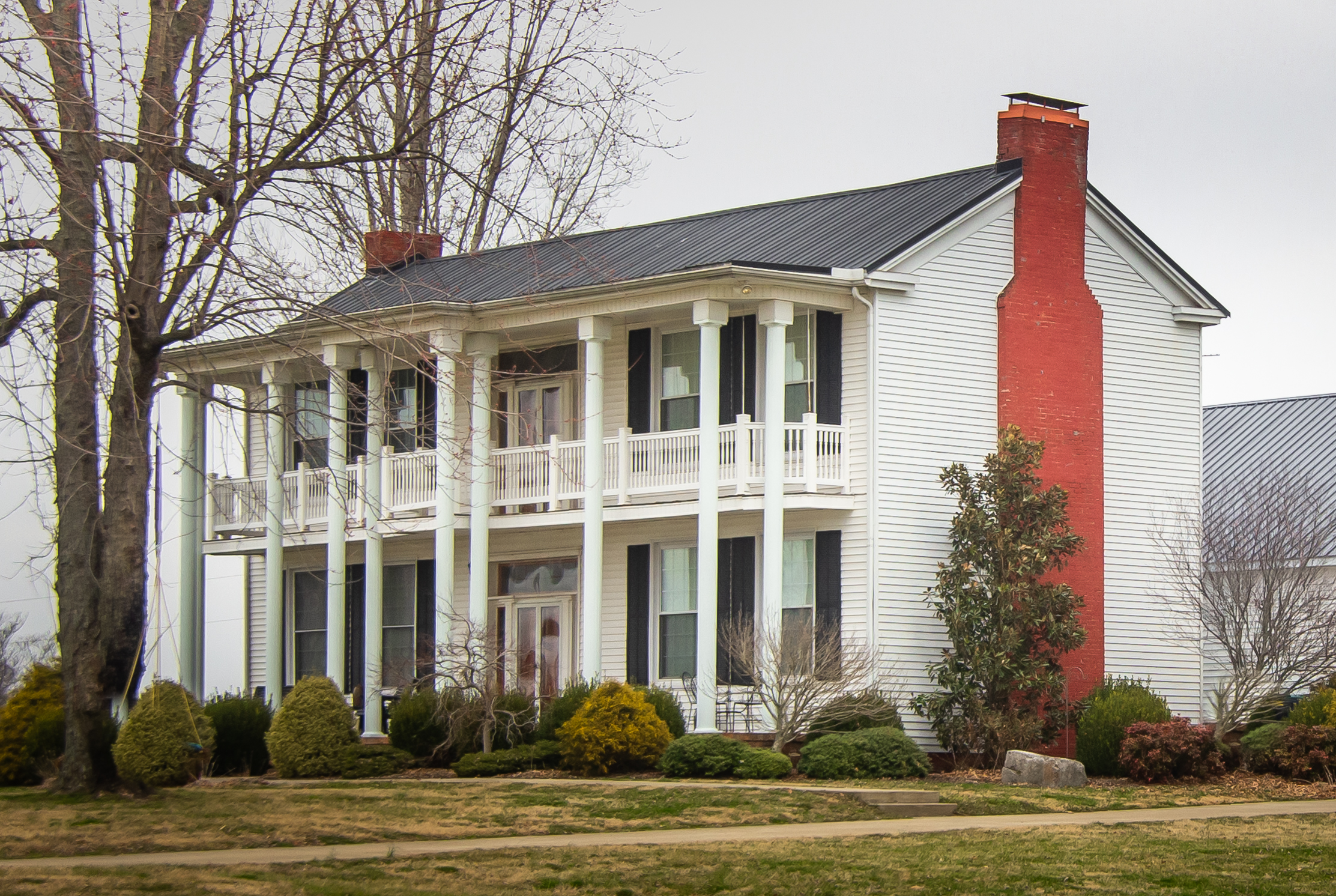

- Location within Kentucky Location within the United States
- Nearest city: Adairville, Kentucky
- Coordinates: 36°43′46″N 86°49′55″W
- Area: less than one acre
- Built: c.1851
- Architectural style: Greek Revival, Italianate
- NRHP reference No.: 92000170
- Added to NRHP: March 19, 1992

The Longview Farm House near Adairville, Kentucky, United States, was listed on the National Register of Historic Places in 1992.

The main building of the farm complex is a wood frame, clapboarded I-house built in about 1851.

It is located about 4 miles (6.4 km) north of Adairville.
