= List of National Historic Landmarks in Kentucky =

This is a complete list of National Historic Landmarks in Kentucky. There are 33 such landmarks in Kentucky; one landmark has had its designation withdrawn.

== Key ==
	National Historic Landmark
^{†}	National Historic Landmark District
^{#}	National Historic Site, National Historical Park, National Memorial, or National Monument
^{*}	Delisted Landmark

== List ==
	Landmark name	Image	Date designated	Location	County	Description
1	Daniel C. Beard Boyhood Home	Daniel C. Beard Boyhood Home	June 23, 1965 (#66000360)	Covington; 39°05′21″N 84°30′20″W	Kenton	Home of Daniel Carter Beard, a founder of the Boy Scouts of America
2	BELLE OF LOUISVILLE (river steamboat)	BELLE OF LOUISVILLE (river steamboat)	June 30, 1989 (#72000535)	Louisville; 38°15′33″N 85°45′20″W	Jefferson	One of the last authentic steamboats in existence
3	Big Bone Lick Site	Big Bone Lick Site	December 13, 2024 (#100011352)	Route 1; 38°53′10″N 84°45′15″W	Boone	The major archaeological features of Big Bone Lick State Park.
4	Burks' Distillery	Burks' Distillery	January 16, 1980 (#74000893)	Loretto; 37°38′52″N 85°20′56″W	Marion	Producer of Maker's Mark bourbon whiskey
5^{†}	Camp Nelson Historic and Archeological District	Camp Nelson Historic and Archeological District	February 27, 2013 (#13000286)	Nicholasville; 37°47′16″N 84°35′53″W	Jessamine	Military depot and African-American recruitment center for the Union Army
6	Churchill Downs	Churchill Downs	October 21, 1986 (#78001348)	Louisville; 38°12′11″N 85°46′12″W	Jefferson	Home of the legendary Kentucky Derby
7	Henry Clay Home (Ashland)	Henry Clay Home (Ashland)	December 19, 1960 (#66000357)	Lexington; 38°01′43″N 84°28′48″W	Fayette	Home of Henry Clay
8	Covington and Cincinnati Suspension Bridge	Covington and Cincinnati Suspension Bridge	May 15, 1975 (#75000786)	Covington, KY and Cincinnati, OH; 39°05′32″N 84°30′34″W	Kenton, KY and Hamilton, OH	Prototype for New York's Brooklyn Bridge
9^{†}	Fort Boonesborough Site	Fort Boonesborough Site	June 19, 1996 (#94000303)	Richmond; 37°54′02″N 84°16′06″W	Madison	One of the original settlements in Kentucky
10^{†}	Green River Shell Middens Archeological District	Green River Shell Middens Archeological District	May 5, 1994 (#85003182)	Multiple	Butler, Henderson, McLean, Muhlenberg, and Ohio	23 Late Archaic period sites
11	Indian Knoll		September 23, 1964 (#66000362)	McHenry	Ohio	Archaic shell midden
12	Jacobs Hall, Kentucky School for the Deaf	Jacobs Hall, Kentucky School for the Deaf	December 21, 1965 (#66000354)	Danville; 37°38′29″N 84°46′18″W	Boyle	Oldest remaining building at the Kentucky School for the Deaf
13	Keeneland Race Course	Keeneland Race Course	September 24, 1986 (#86003487)	Lexington; 38°02′44″N 84°36′38″W	Fayette	Race track
14^{†}	Labrot and Graham's Old Oscar Pepper Distillery	Labrot and Graham's Old Oscar Pepper Distillery	May 16, 2000 (#95001272)	Versailles; 38°06′46″N 84°48′43″W	Woodford	Producer of Woodford Reserve bourbon whiskey
15	Liberty Hall	Liberty Hall	November 11, 1971 (#71000344)	Frankfort; 38°11′59″N 84°52′52″W	Franklin	Home of John Brown, who helped Kentucky attain statehood
16	Lincoln Hall, Berea College	Lincoln Hall, Berea College	December 2, 1974 (#74000892)	Berea; 37°34′19″N 84°17′09″W	Madison	Building at Berea College, first biracial college in the United States
17	Locust Grove	Locust Grove	June 23, 1986 (#71000347)	Louisville; 38°17′13″N 85°39′43″W	Jefferson	Former domicile of George Rogers Clark
18	Louisville Water Company Pumping Station	Louisville Water Company Pumping Station	November 11, 1971 (#71000348)	Louisville; 38°16′50″N 85°42′04″W	Jefferson	Historic water tower and pumping station along the Ohio River
19	MAYOR ANDREW BROADDUS (Lifesaving Station)	MAYOR ANDREW BROADDUS (Lifesaving Station)	June 30, 1989 (#89001446)	Louisville; 38°15′33″N 85°45′18″W	Jefferson	Only remaining floating lifestation
20	Dr. Ephraim McDowell House	Dr. Ephraim McDowell House	January 12, 1965 (#66000355)	Danville; 37°38′42″N 84°46′16″W	Boyle	Site of first successful ovariotomy, done by Ephraim McDowell
21	Middle Creek Battlefield	Middle Creek Battlefield	October 5, 1992 (#91001665)	Prestonsburg; 37°39′01″N 82°48′50″W	Floyd	Site of an early Union victory in January 1862, with future President James A. Garfield commanding the Union troops
22^{†}	Mill Springs Battlefield	Mill Springs Battlefield	April 19, 1994 (#93000001)	Nancy; 37°00′19″N 84°45′28″W	Pulaski	Where a Union victory ended Confederate defensive line in Kentucky in 1862
23	Old Bank of Louisville	Old Bank of Louisville	November 11, 1971 (#71000349)	Louisville; 38°15′20″N 85°45′20″W	Jefferson	
24	Old Morrison, Transylvania College	Old Morrison, Transylvania College	December 21, 1965 (#66000358)	Lexington; 38°03′09″N 84°29′38″W	Fayette	One of the first buildings of Transylvania University, the first college built west of the Appalachian Mountains
25	Old State House	Old State House	November 11, 1971 (#71000346)	Frankfort; 38°12′01″N 84°52′36″W	Franklin	
26	Perryville Battlefield	Perryville Battlefield	December 19, 1960 (#66000356)	Perryville; 37°40′31″N 84°58′11″W	Boyle	Site of largest battle in Kentucky during the American Civil War
27^{†}	Pine Mountain Settlement School	Pine Mountain Settlement School	December 4, 1991 (#78001337)	Bledsoe; 36°56′55″N 83°10′59″W	Harlan	Brought to a rural community an urban settlement house
28^{†}	Shakertown at Pleasant Hill Historic District	Shakertown at Pleasant Hill Historic District	November 11, 1971 (#71000353)	Harrodsburg; 37°49′05″N 84°44′25″W	Mercer	Home of a Shaker community
29	George T. Stagg Distillery	George T. Stagg Distillery	February 27, 2013 (#01000450)	Frankfort; 38°13′03″N 84°52′11″W	Franklin	Producer of Buffalo Trace bourbon whiskey, a rare example of a distillery that operated before, during, and after Prohibition
30	Zachary Taylor House	Zachary Taylor House	July 4, 1961 (#66000359)	Louisville; 38°16′45″N 85°38′50″W	Jefferson	Home of U.S. President Zachary Taylor
31	United States Marine Hospital	United States Marine Hospital	September 25, 1997 (#97001265)	Louisville; 38°16′16″N 85°47′03″W	Jefferson	
32	Wendover (Frontier Nursing Service Headquarters)	Wendover (Frontier Nursing Service Headquarters)	July 17, 1991 (#75000792)	Hyden; 37°07′39″N 83°21′55″W	Leslie	First American attempt to professionalize midwifery
33	Whitney M. Young Birthplace and Boyhood Home	Whitney M. Young Birthplace and Boyhood Home	April 27, 1984 (#72000543)	Simpsonville; 38°13′22″N 85°22′20″W	Shelby	Birthplace and childhood home of Whitney Young

== See also ==
- National Register of Historic Places listings in Kentucky
- List of National Historic Landmarks by state
- List of National Natural Landmarks in Kentucky
