= Zachary Taylor House =

- U.S. National Register of Historic Places
- U.S. National Historic Landmark
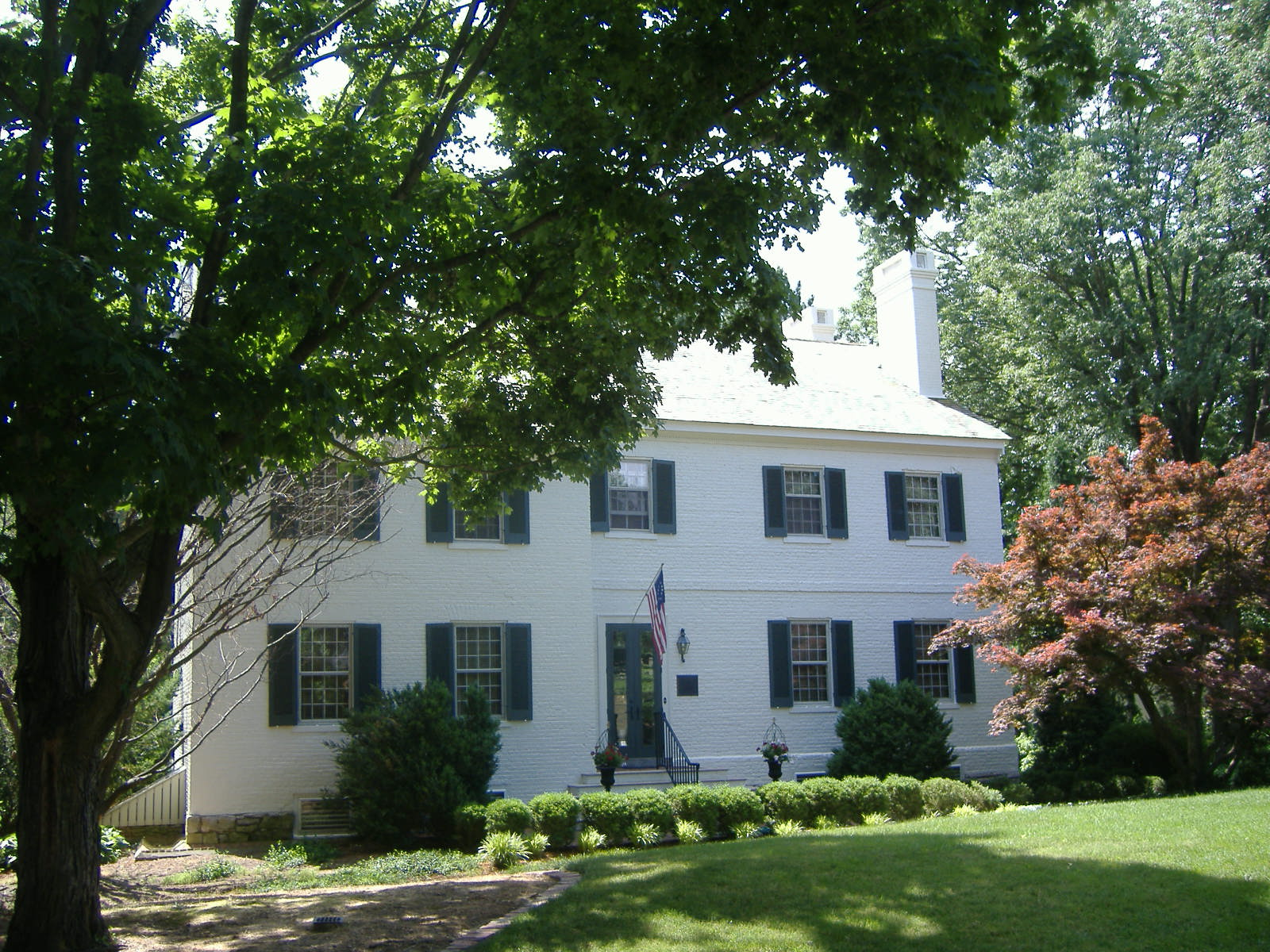
- Zachary Taylor's childhood home

- Location within Kentucky Location within the United States
- Location: 5608 Apache Rd., Louisville, Kentucky
- Coordinates: 38°16′45″N 85°38′50″W
- Area: less than one acre
- Built: 1794-5
- Architectural style: Georgian Colonial
- NRHP reference No.: 66000359

Significant dates
- Added to NRHP: October 15, 1966
- Designated NHL: July 4, 1961

The Zachary Taylor House, also known as Springfield, was the boyhood home of the 12th president of the United States, Zachary Taylor. Located in what is now a residential area of Louisville, Kentucky, Taylor lived there from 1785 to 1808, held his marriage there in 1810, and returned there periodically the rest of his life.

== History ==
Zachary Taylor's father, Colonel Richard Taylor, purchased a 400-acre (1.6 km^{2}) farm on the Muddy Fork of Beargrass Creek in 1785, while Zachary was eight months old. They initially lived in a log cabin on the property. Commencing in June, 1792, after participating in the constitutional convention that made Kentucky a state, Col. Taylor built a two-story brick house on the land that he purchased from Isaac Shelby. He sold that house to George Rudy on Dec. 1, 1795. During that time, Richard Taylor built a second house at the highest point on his property, dubbing it "Springfield". By 1800 Richard Taylor purchased an additional three hundred acres, making his property 700 acres (2.8 km^{2}) in total. The property was adjacent to Locust Grove, the farm where George Rogers Clark lived from 1809 until his death in 1818. Before he began his military career in 1808, Zachary Taylor lived thirteen years in the house. He would later return to the house to be married on June 18, 1810, and have five of his six children born in the house. In 1829 the house was sold upon Richard Taylor's death, due to debts he had acquired. After his death in 1850, Zachary Taylor was buried in the family cemetery located on the property. This later became the original section of Zachary Taylor National Cemetery.

Much of the original Taylor property remained together until the 1950s, when it was divided. Of the original 400 acres (1.6 km^{2}), the Taylor property is only 3/4 of an acre in size.

During the Super Outbreak of tornadoes on April 3–4, 1974, Springfield suffered major wind and water damage, including the two porches and the roof being blown off.

There have been attempts to make the house a National Historic Site, but these attempts have failed due to the required demolition of surrounding buildings needed to make it a National Historic Site.

== Construction ==
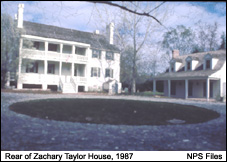
The rear side of the home

Springfield is a 2 1/2-story Georgia Colonial red brick L-shaped house. The western section of the house is the oldest, built around 1795. The eastern section was built between 1810 and 1830. It features a gable roof, a double-parlor, and fireplaces in each room. It was constructed by Richard Taylor and the people he enslaved.

After the Taylors left, major additions included two Victorian porches, an altering of a staircase's direction, and the eaves improved with a bracketed cornice. Two bathrooms were added to the first floor in the 1930s.

== See also ==
- List of residences of presidents of the United States
- List of the oldest buildings in Kentucky
- List of National Historic Landmarks in Kentucky
- National Register of Historic Places in Jefferson County, Kentucky
