= Historic Locust Grove =

- Locust Grove
- U.S. National Register of Historic Places
- U.S. National Historic Landmark
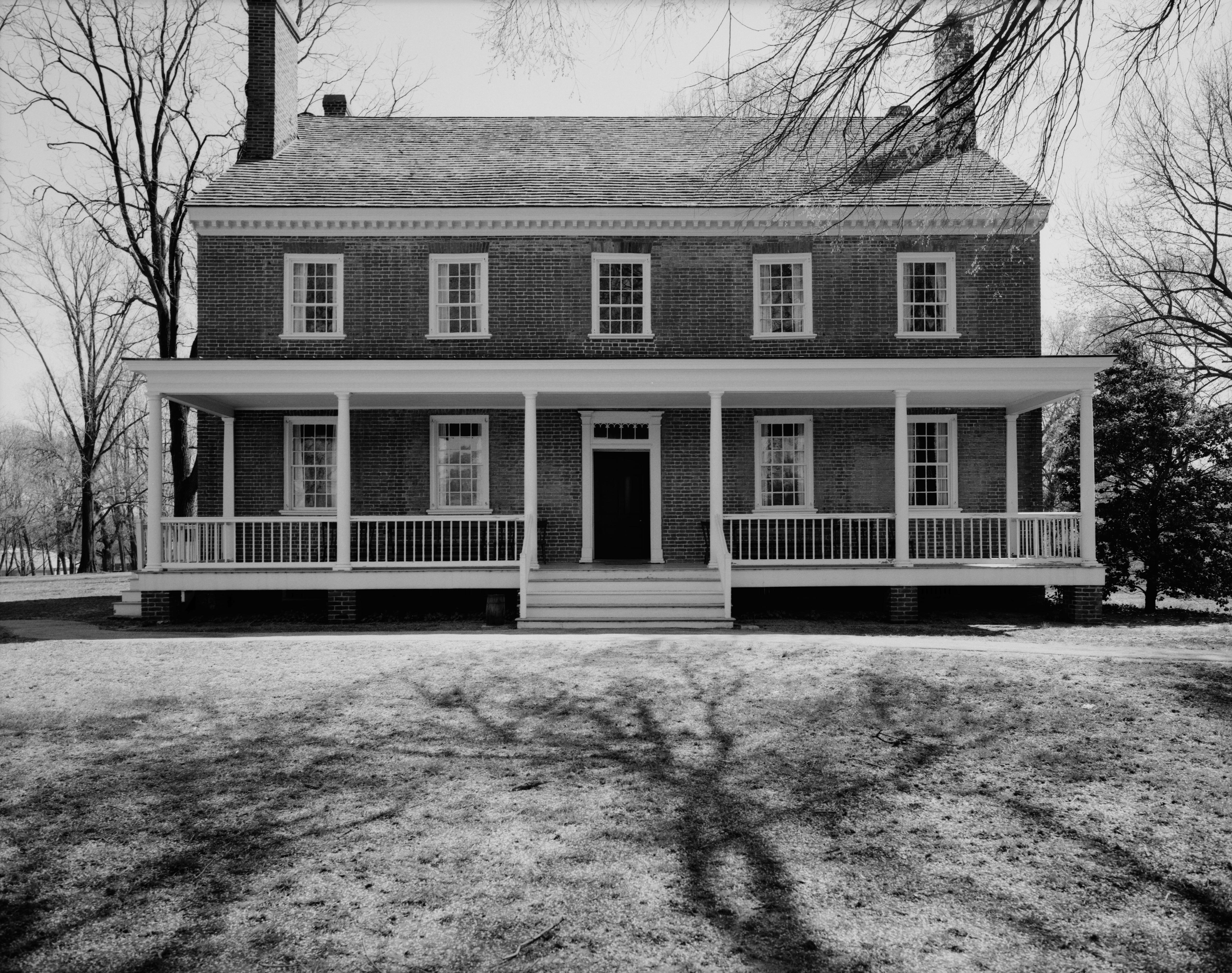
- Croghan Mansion at Locust Grove
- Interactive map of Locust Grove
- Location: 561 Blankenbaker Lane; Louisville, Kentucky
- Coordinates: 38°17′13.40″N 85°39′42.90″W
- Area: 55 acres (22 ha)
- Built: 1790
- Architect: William Croghan
- Architectural style: Georgian
- Website: locustgrove.org
- NRHP reference No.: 71000347

Significant dates
- Added to NRHP: March 11, 1971
- Designated NHL: June 23, 1986

Historic Locust Grove is a 55-acre 18th-century farm site and National Historic Landmark situated in eastern Jefferson County, Kentucky in what is now Louisville. The site is owned by the Louisville Metro government, and operated as a historic interpretive site by Historic Locust Grove, Inc.

The main feature on the property is the ca. 1790 Georgian mansion that was the home of the Croghan family and gathering place for George Rogers Clark, Lewis and Clark, and U.S. Presidents. In addition to the mansion there is the Visitors Center that houses a gift shop, museum and meeting space.

Dozens of African Americans were enslaved at Locust House by the Croghans between 1790 and 1849. At the peak of the farm's operations in 1820, more than 40 enslaved people labored there.

== History ==
The site was founded in 1790 by William Croghan and his wife Lucy Clark Croghan. Croghan was a captain and a major in the Virginia Continental Line and postwar chief bounty land surveyor for veterans of the Virginia State Line. Lucy was the sister of Croghan's wartime comrade Jonathan Clark, Virginia State general George Rogers Clark, and western explorer William Clark of the Lewis & Clark expedition.

The house and outbuildings were built by enslaved African Americans. Enslaved people also planted and harvested the crops, cooked the meals, made the family's clothing, washed their laundry, and were caregivers for the Croghan children.

Lucy was the sister of Brigadier General George Rogers Clark, former surveying partner of William Croghan and William Clark of the Lewis and Clark Expedition. At its peak, the Locust Grove estate was nearly 700 acres (280 ha) in size, and a small fraction of Croghan's extensive landholdings, which exceeded 53,000 acres (210 km^{2}) at his death in 1822.

Tracing their way back from the Pacific Ocean, on November 8, 1806, Meriwether Lewis and William Clark arrived at Locust Grove to a homecoming where Lucy Clark Croghan and her family welcomed them back from their journey. Locust Grove became the only residence still in existence west of the Appalachian Mountains to have sheltered Lewis and Clark. In the Fall of 2006, Locust Grove commemorated the 200th anniversary of Lewis and Clark's return.

George Rogers Clark lived at the site in the final years of his life, from 1809 to 1818.

The property was adjacent to Springfield, the home of Colonel Richard Taylor and his son, future U.S. President Zachary Taylor.

Following the death of William Croghan, the estate passed to John C. Croghan, notable for his purchase of Mammoth Cave in 1838.

In the winter of 1844, the enslaved African-American Stephen Bishop produced a map of Mammoth Cave. His map was published in 1845 and remained the most complete and accurate map of the period until modern survey techniques were applied in 1908. A significant epilogue to Bishop's story occurred in 1972, when a long-sought route connecting the caves of Flint Ridge and Mammoth Cave Ridge was discovered in an area which Bishop had mapped, but which had in the interim been almost completely flooded by the construction of a dam on the surface nearby: the area of the 20th Century connection route is shown on Bishop's 19th century map.

It was declared a National Historic Landmark in 1986, as one of the few surviving residences associated with George Rogers Clark.

== Gallery ==
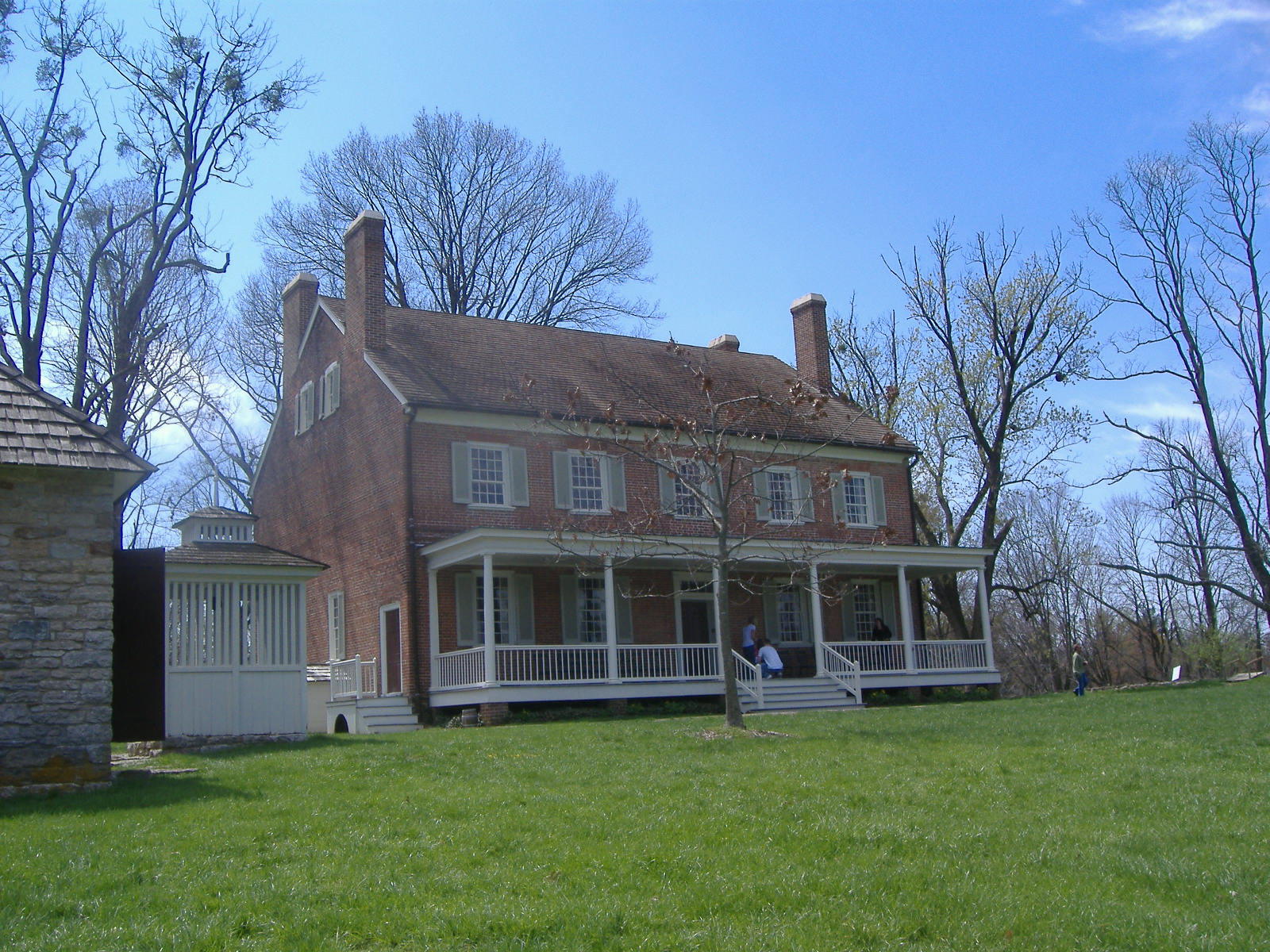
Closeup of main house

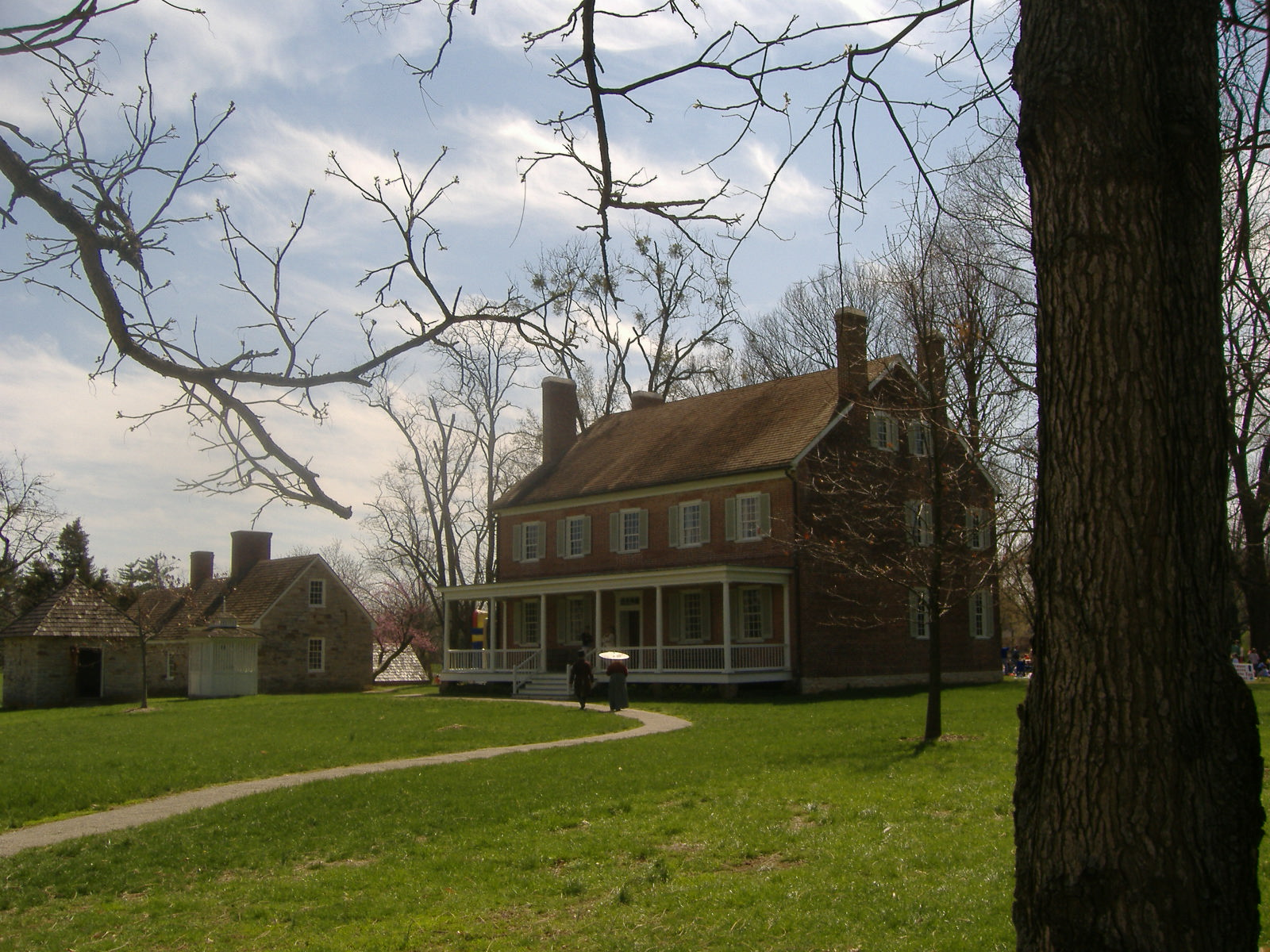
Northeast view of main house

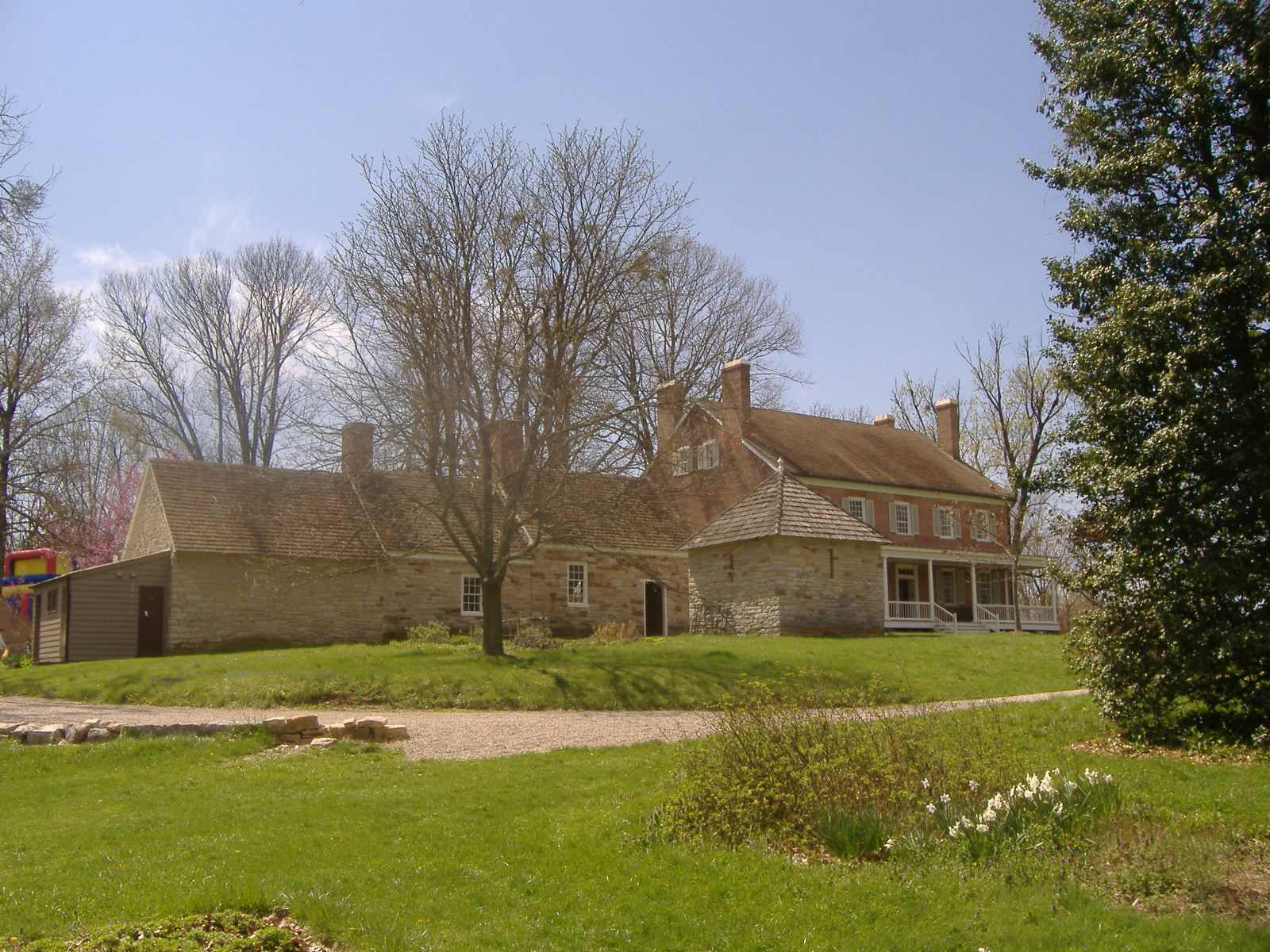
Southeast view of main house

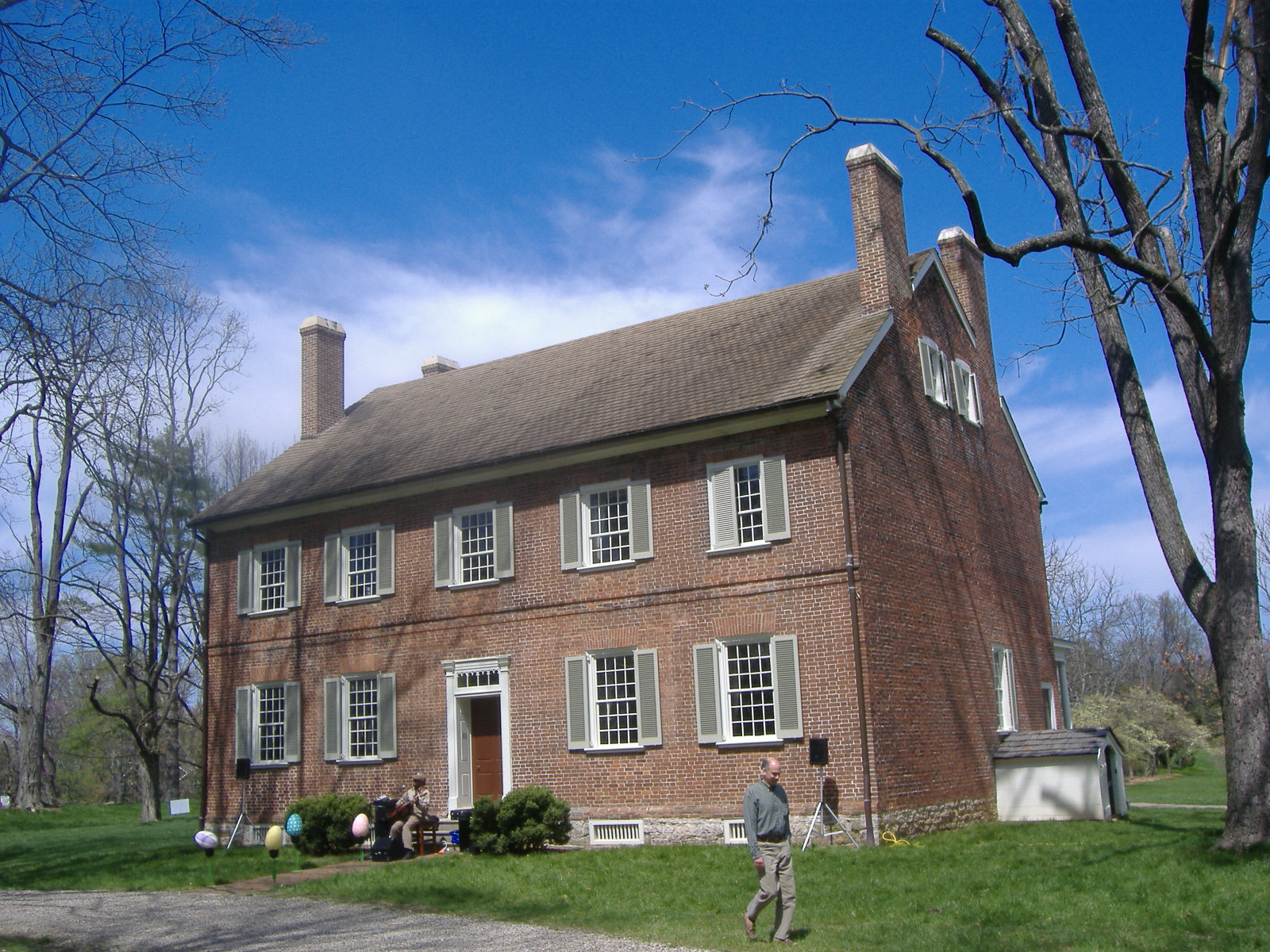
Southwest view of main house

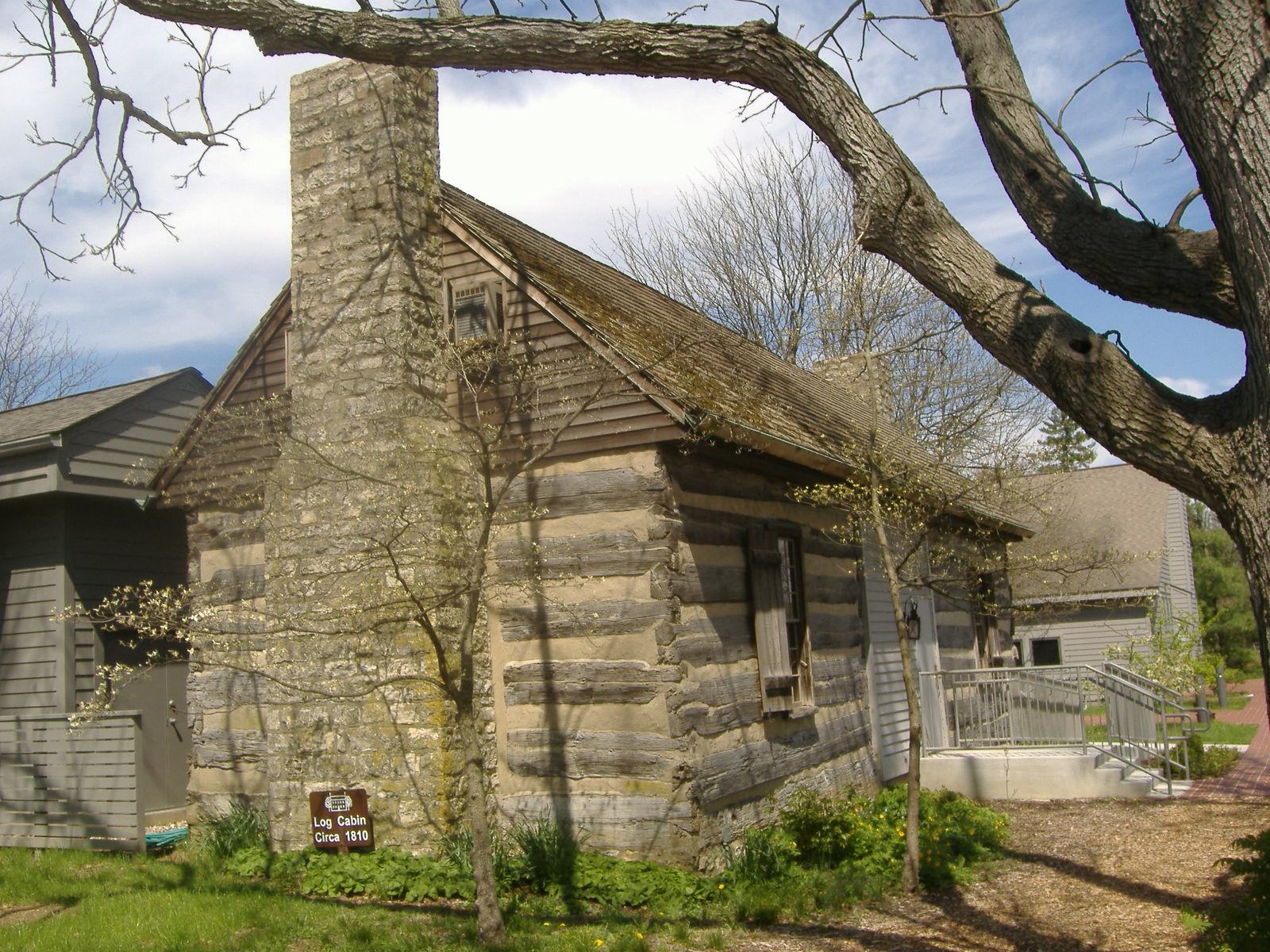
Log Cabin built around 1815 at the site

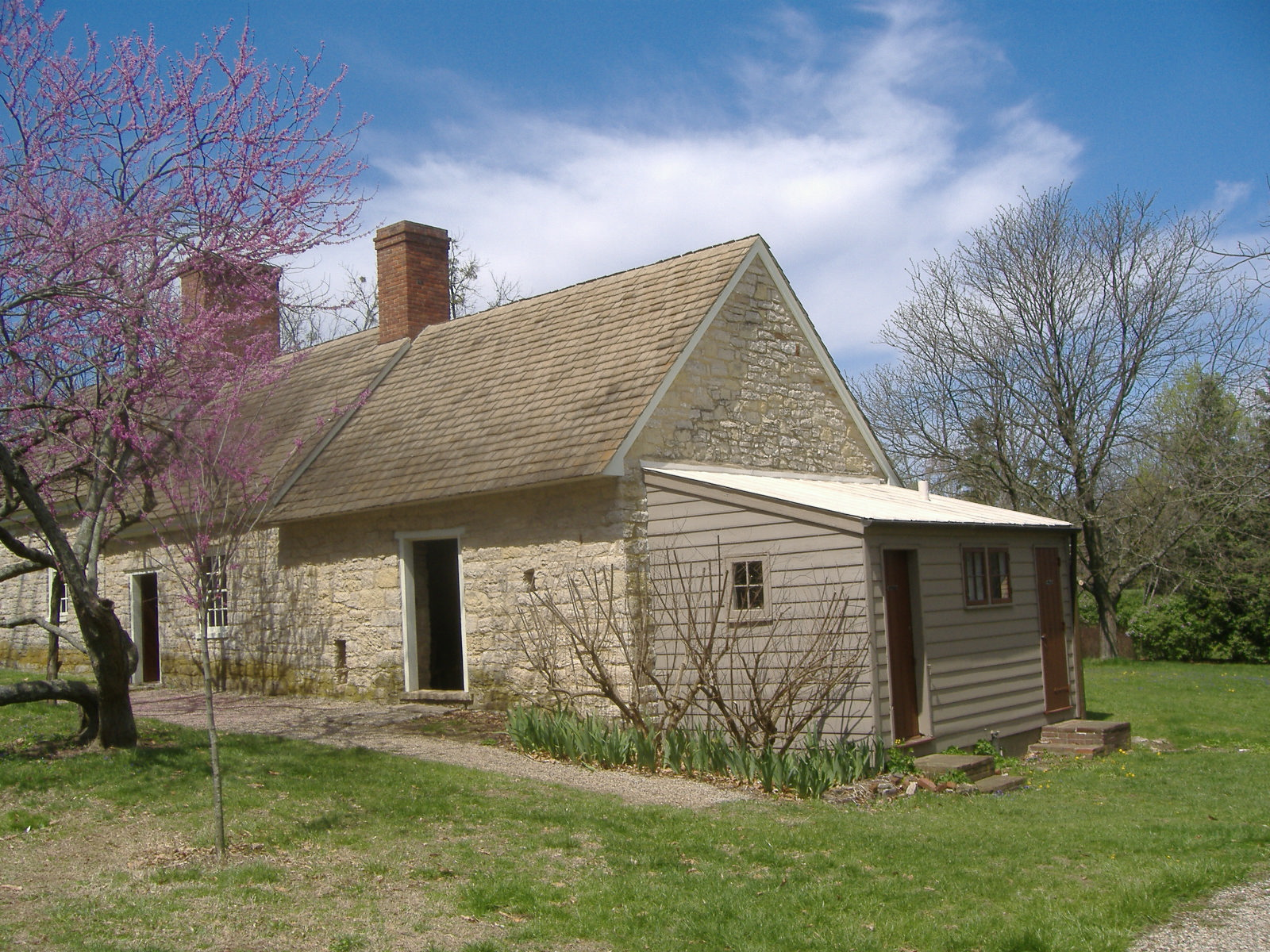
The smokehouse is the only other original building at Locust Grove

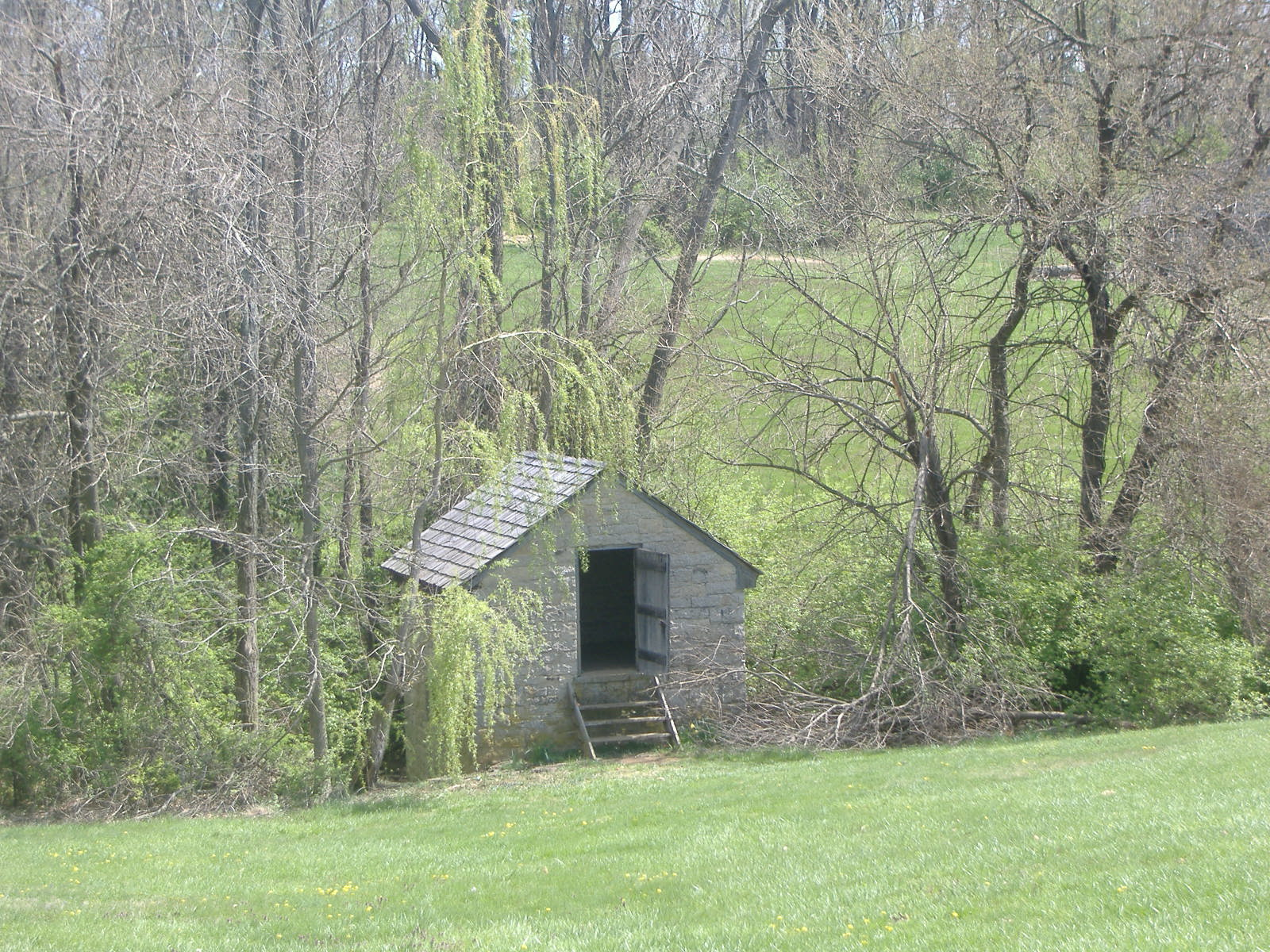
Springhouse

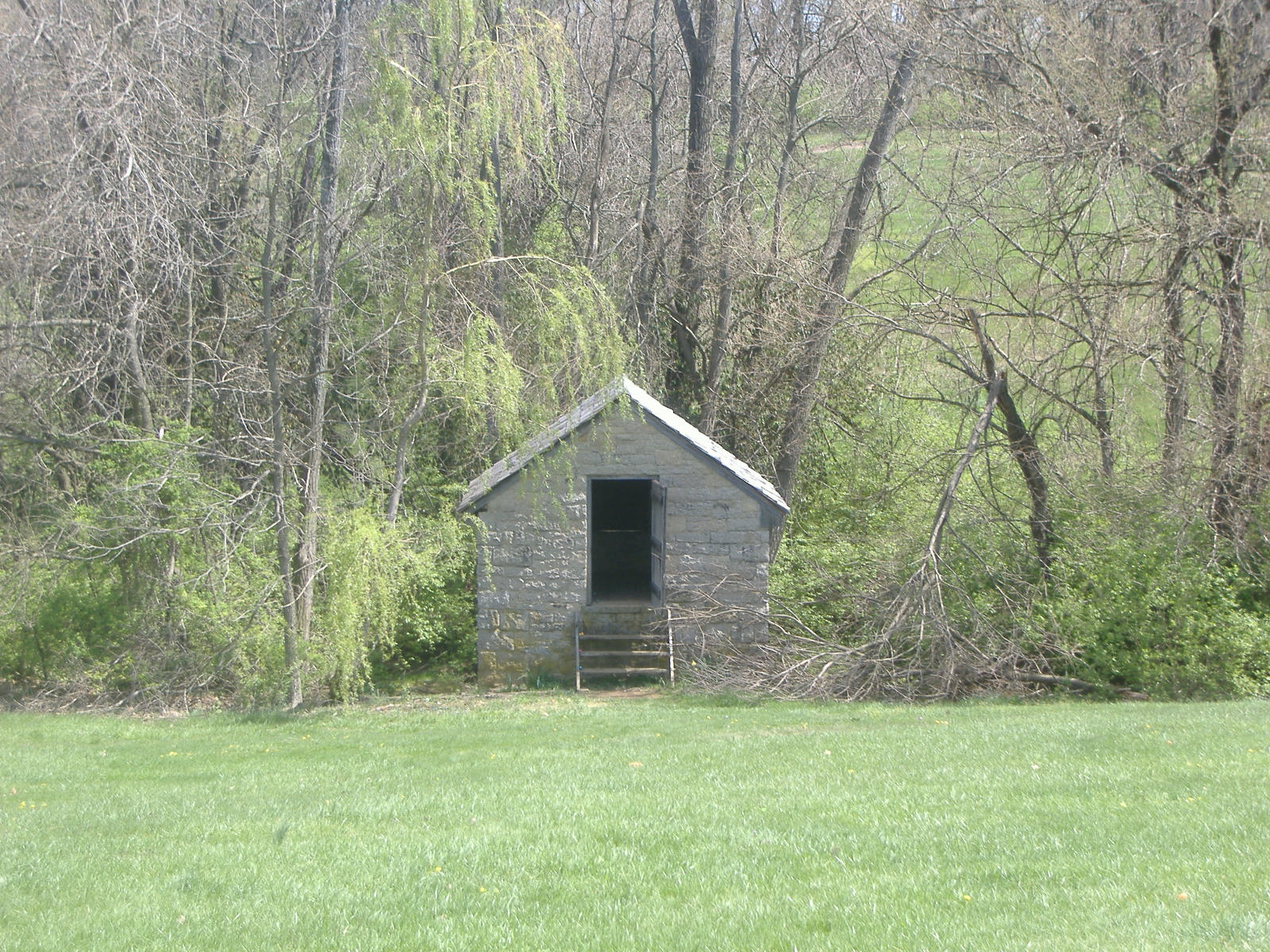
Springhouse

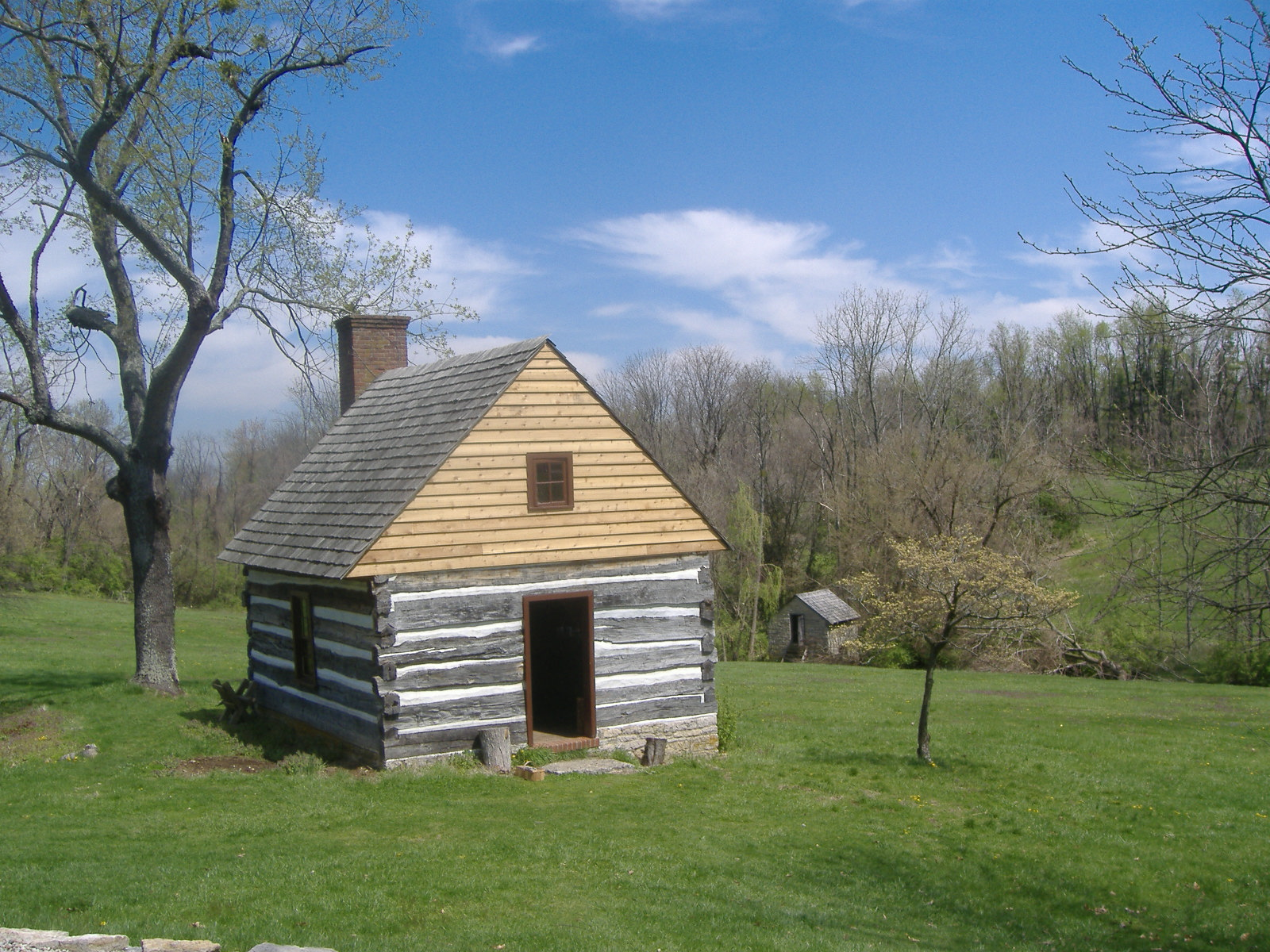
Woodworking shed

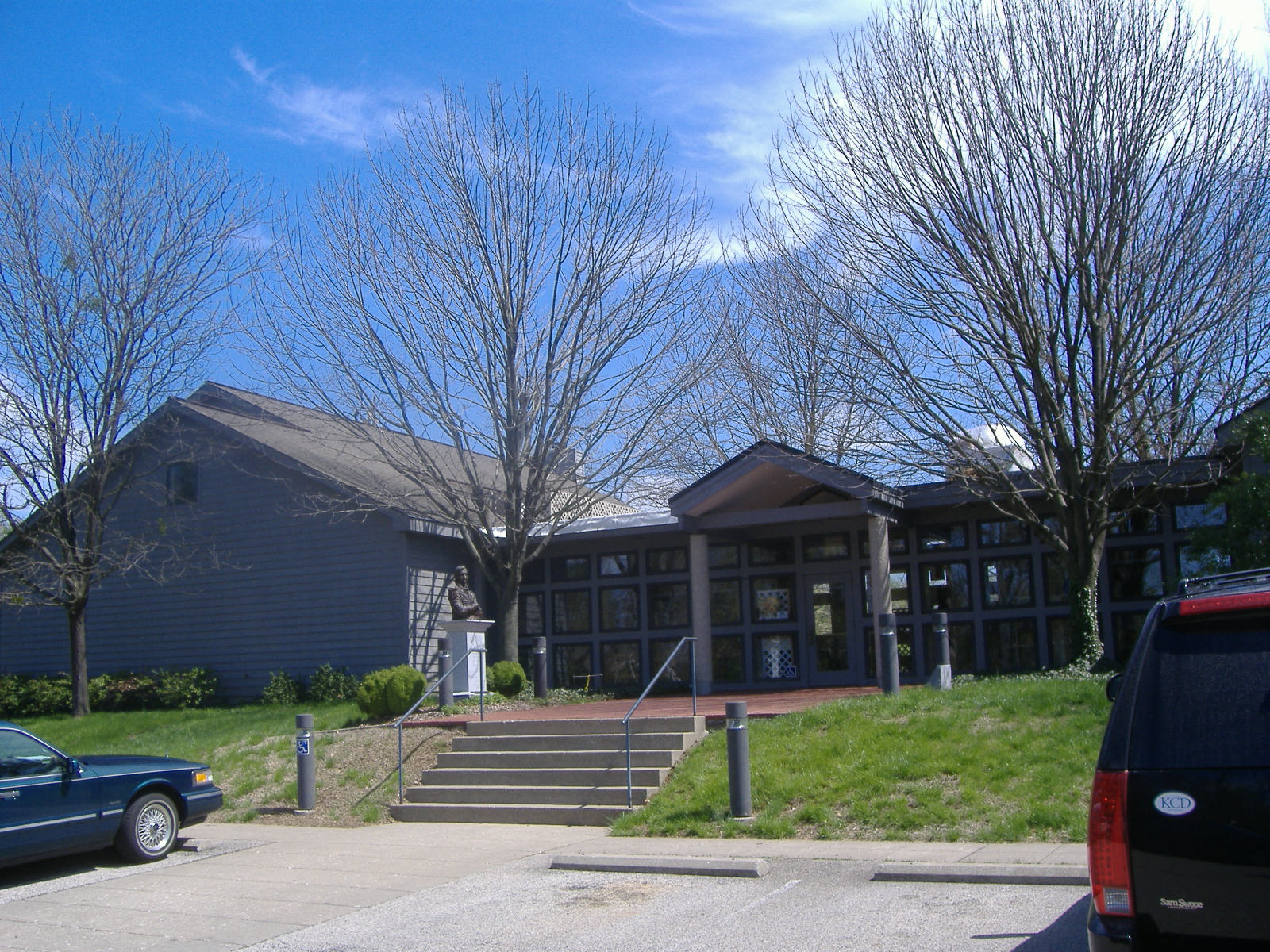
Visitor Center

== See also ==
- Farmington (Louisville, Kentucky)
- List of attractions and events in the Louisville metropolitan area
- List of museums in the Louisville metropolitan area
- List of the oldest buildings in Kentucky
- List of parks in the Louisville metropolitan area
- Riverside, The Farnsley–Moremen Landing
- List of National Historic Landmarks in Kentucky
