= California, Kentucky =

- City
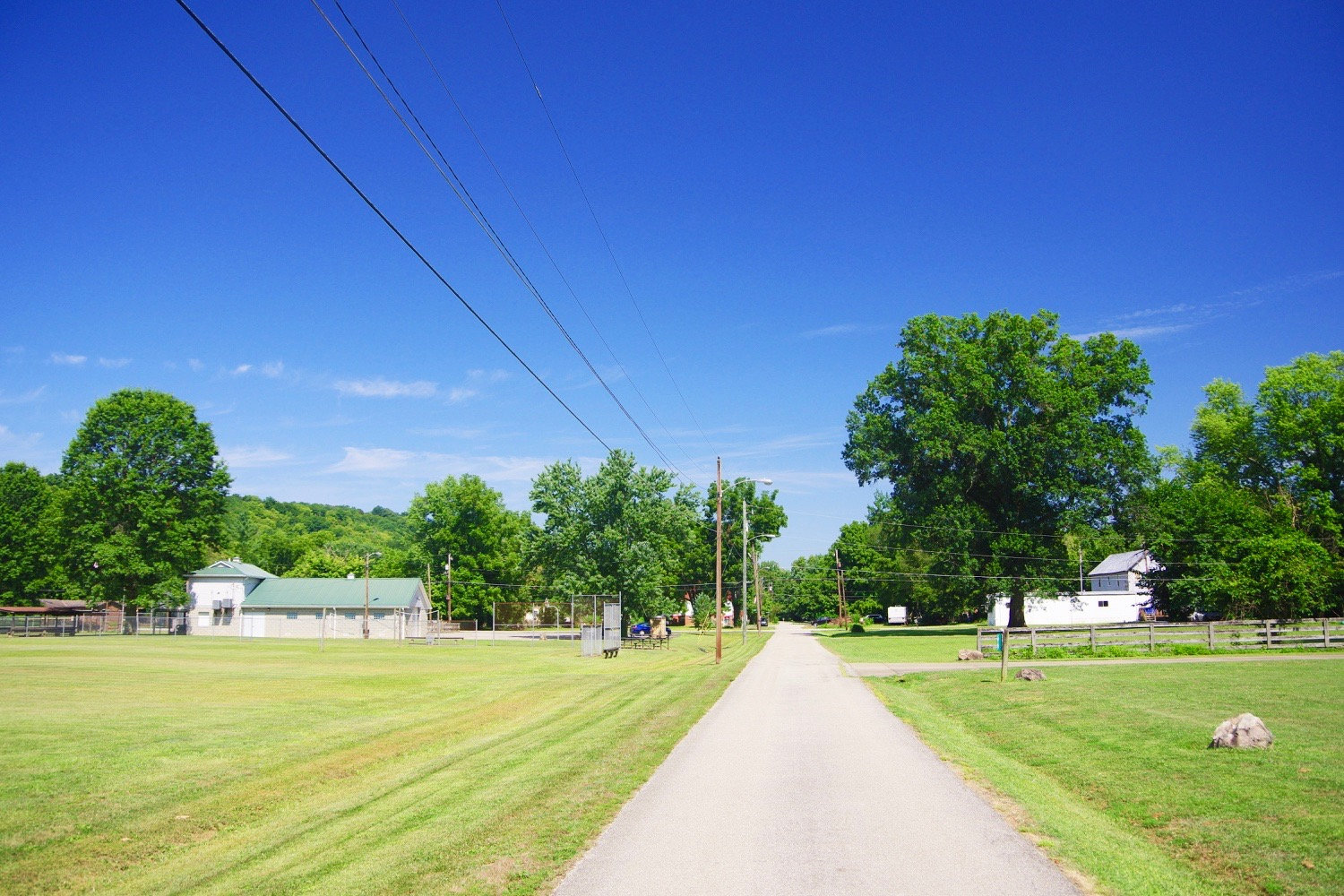
- View along Madison Avenue

- Location of California in Campbell County, Kentucky.
- Coordinates: 38°55′06″N 84°15′49″W
- Country: United States
- State: Kentucky
- County: Campbell

Area
  - Total: 0.22 sq mi (0.57 km^{2})
  - Land: 0.22 sq mi (0.57 km^{2})
  - Water: 0 sq mi (0.00 km^{2})
- Elevation: 492 ft (150 m)

Population (2020)
  - Total: 83
  - Density: 377.6/sq mi (145.81/km^{2})
- Time zone: UTC-5 (Eastern (EST))
  - Summer (DST): UTC-4 (EDT)
- ZIP code: 41007
- Area code: 859
- FIPS code: 21-11872
- GNIS feature ID: 2403969

California is a home rule-class city in Campbell County, Kentucky, United States. The population was 83 at the 2020 census.

== History ==
California, Kentucky was founded ca. 1849, and named from news reports of the contemporaneous California Gold Rush. A post office has been in operation at California since 1852. California was incorporated as a city on February 7, 1874.

The Elijah Herndon House in California is listed on the National Register of Historic Places in Campbell County. Soprano Mary Hissem De Moss was born in California, Kentucky in 1871.

== Geography ==
California is located in southeastern Campbell County along the Ohio River. Kentucky Route 8 passes just west of the community, leading northwest (downstream) along the river 23 miles (37 km) to Covington and southeast (upstream) 21 miles (34 km) to Augusta. Clermontville, in Clermont County, Ohio, is directly across the river from California, but the closest bridge across the river is Interstate 275 14 miles (23 km) downriver.

According to the United States Census Bureau, the city of California has a total area of 0.25 square miles (0.66 km^{2}), all land.

== Climate ==
The climate in this area is characterized by hot, humid summers and generally mild to cool winters. According to the Köppen Climate Classification system, California has a humid subtropical climate, abbreviated "Cfa" on climate maps.

== Demographics ==
Historical population
Census	Pop.	Note	%±
1880	179		—
1890	316		76.5%
1900	292		−7.6%
1910	248		−15.1%
1920	146		−41.1%
1930	144		−1.4%
1940	106		−26.4%
1950	117		10.4%
1960	163		39.3%
1970	90		−44.8%
1980	135		50.0%
1990	130		−3.7%
2000	86		−33.8%
2010	90		4.7%
2020	83		−7.8%
U.S. Decennial Census

As of the census of 2000, there were 86 people, 26 households, and 21 families residing in the city. The population density was 358.2 inhabitants per square mile (138.3/km^{2}). There were 27 housing units at an average density of 112.5 per square mile (43.4/km^{2}). The racial makeup of the city was 100.00% White.

There were 26 households, out of which 57.7% had children under the age of 18 living with them, 73.1% were married couples living together, 3.8% had a female householder with no husband present, and 19.2% were non-families. 19.2% of all households were made up of individuals, and none had someone living alone who was 65 years of age or older. The average household size was 3.31 and the average family size was 3.76.

In the city, the population was spread out, with 36.0% under the age of 18, 7.0% from 18 to 24, 37.2% from 25 to 44, 16.3% from 45 to 64, and 3.5% who were 65 years of age or older. The median age was 32 years. For every 100 females, there were 68.6 males. For every 100 females age 18 and over, there were 89.7 males.

The median income for a household in the city was $37,500, and the median income for a family was $38,000. Males had a median income of $43,750 versus $30,625 for females. The per capita income for the city was $15,143. None of the population and none of the families were below the poverty line.

The U.S. Postal Service ZIP code area for California serves a population of approximately 4,000, almost all of whom live outside the city limits.

== Education ==
Residents are within the Campbell County School District. Residents are zoned to Campbell County High School in Alexandria.

== See also ==
- List of cities and towns along the Ohio River
