= Elijah Herndon House =

Historic house in Kentucky, United States

- U.S. National Register of Historic Places
- Location within Kentucky Location within the United States
- Nearest city: California, Kentucky
- Coordinates: 38°55′37″N 84°17′40″W
- Area: 1.5 acres (0.61 ha)
- Built: 1818; 208 years ago
- Architect: Herndon Elijah
- Architectural style: Federal
- NRHP reference No.: 83002604
- Added to NRHP: October 29, 1983

The Elijah Herndon House is located in California, Kentucky and built in the Federal style in 1818. It was listed on the National Register of Historic Places in 1983.

It is a single-story brick building with a one-story ell, with the front facade's brick laid in Flemish bond and side walls done in common bond. The main block is 20 by 40 feet (6.1 m × 12.2 m) and the ell is 17 by 15 feet (5.2 m × 4.6 m).

Elijah Herndon married and moved to Campbell County, Kentucky before 1800, where he is listed on the census. Elijah appears on the Scott County, Kentucky tax lists for 1796, where he lived with his father Lewis Herndon. Elijah Herndon was born in Goochland County, Virginia November 27, 1774. Elijah and his horse served in the War of 1812 from Kentucky.

A family story states that Elijah and his slaves built the brick home on Washington Trace Road in 1818 out of bricks used as a ship's ballast for his second wife Elizabeth Sadler. Elijah died July 26, 1849.
