= The Oxford =

The Oxford may refer to:

- The Oxford (Waltham, Massachusetts), listed on the NRHP in Massachusetts
- The Oxford (Indianapolis, Indiana), listed on the NRHP in Indiana

== See also ==
- Oxford Historic District (disambiguation)
