= JFG =

JFG may refer to:

- JFG Coffee Company
- Japanese Friendship Garden (disambiguation)
- (...And the JFG?), a musical album by Lo-Fi-Fnk
