= Oxford Historic District =

Oxford Historic District may refer to:
(sorted by state, then city/town)

- Oxford Historic District (Oxford, Georgia), listed on the National Register of Historic Places (NRHP) in Newton County, Georgia
- Oxford Commercial Historic District, Oxford, Iowa, listed on the NRHP in Johnson County, Iowa
- Oxford Historic District (Georgetown, Kentucky), listed on the NRHP in Scott County, Kentucky
- Oxford Historic District (Oxford, Maryland), listed on the NRHP in Talbot County, Maryland
- Oxford Main Street Historic District, Oxford, MA, listed on the NRHP in Worcester County, Massachusetts
- Oxford-Crown Extension District, Worcester, MA, listed on the NRHP in Worcester County, Massachusetts
- Oxford-Crown Historic District, Worcester, MA, listed on the NRHP in Worcester County, Massachusetts
- Oxford Industrial Historic District, Oxford, NJ, listed on the NRHP in Warren County, New Jersey
- Oxford Village Historic District, Oxford, NY, listed on the NRHP in Chenango County, New York
- Oxford Historic District (Oxford, North Carolina), listed on the NRHP in Granville County, North Carolina
- Oxford Historic District (Oxford, Pennsylvania), listed on the NRHP in Chester County, Pennsylvania

== See also ==
- Oxford (disambiguation)
