= Cardome Centre =

Historic house in Kentucky, United States

- Cardome
- U.S. National Register of Historic Places
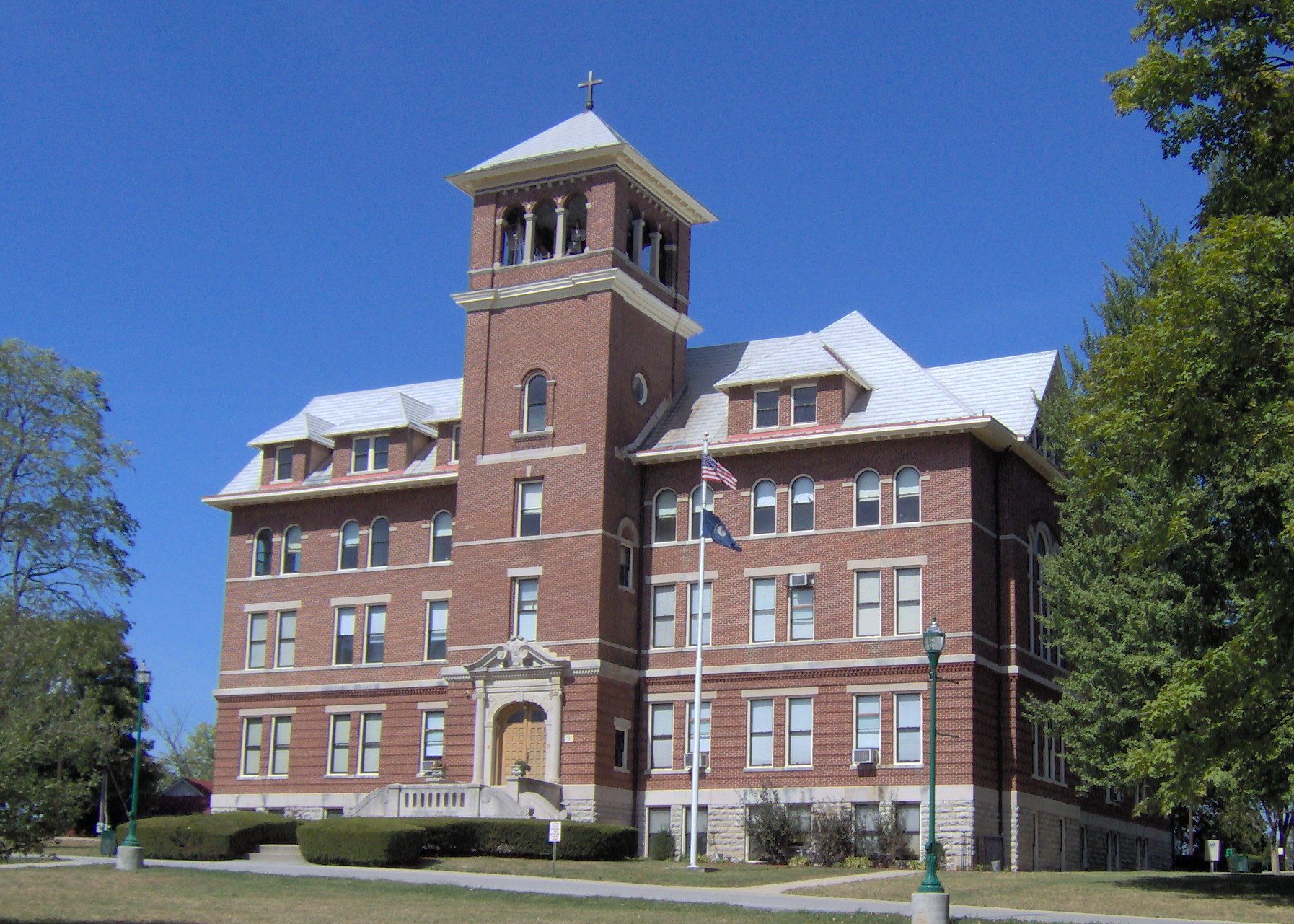
- Cardome

- Location within Kentucky Location within the United States
- Location: Georgetown, Kentucky
- Coordinates: 38°13′20″N 84°34′2″W
- Area: 5 acres (2.0 ha)
- NRHP reference No.: 75000825
- Added to NRHP: March 13, 1975

Cardome Centre is a historic property located in Georgetown, Kentucky along the north fork of Elkhorn Creek. The 87 acres (35 ha) is owned by the Catholic Diocese of Lexington and currently houses St. John Catholic School. Previously the property was home to several famous people including Kentucky Governor James F. Robinson. More recently the site was the location of a girl's academy. It previously served as a community center for the city of Georgetown, but was purchased by the Catholic Diocese of Lexington in 2019.

== History ==
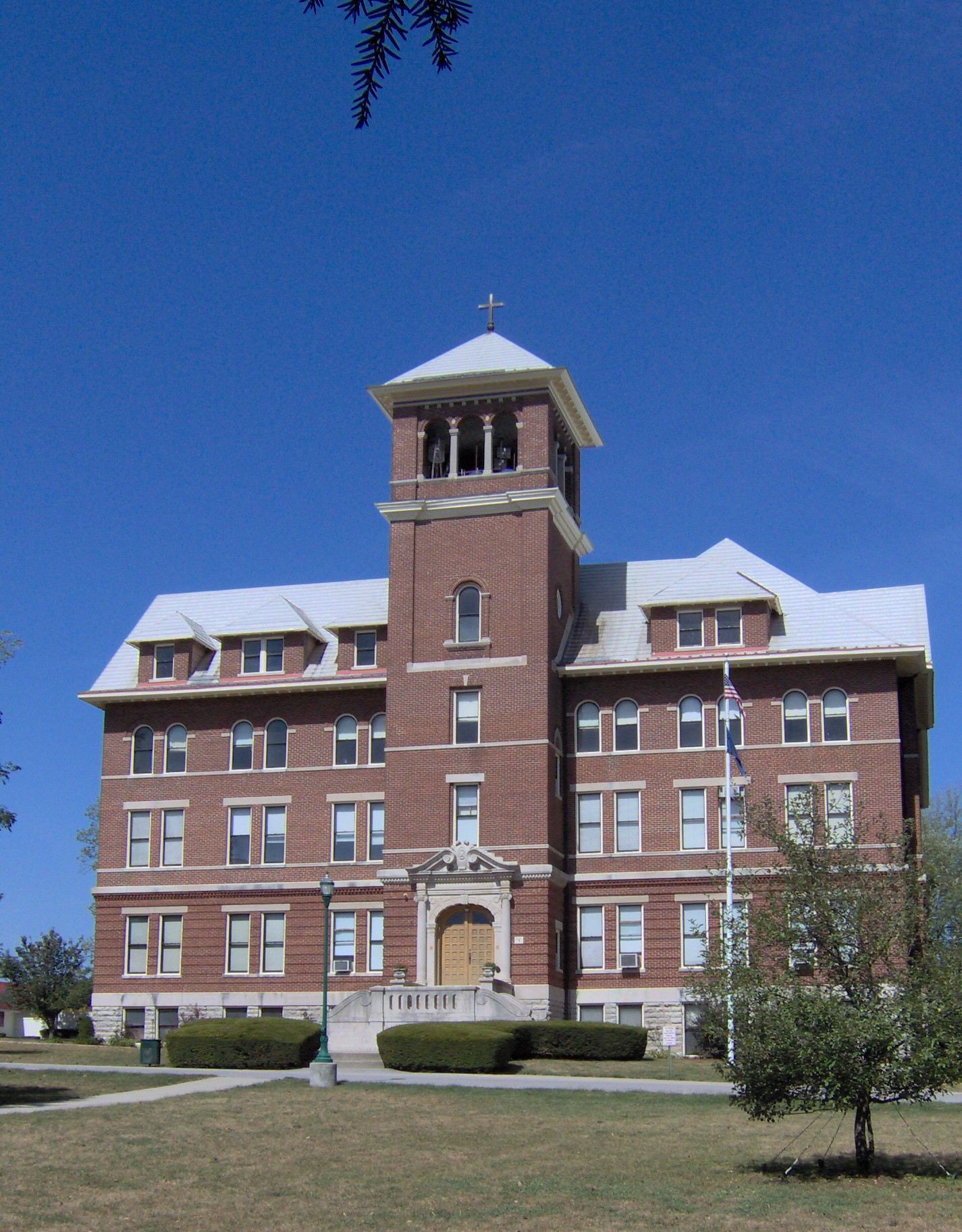
Cardome Centre

For his military service, Colonel John Floyd was granted by the State of Virginia a total of 1,000 acres (400 ha), which included the Cardome property. The first structure was built by the Bradford family in 1821. James F. Robinson, who was governor of Kentucky during the American Civil War, made his home on the land. His home burned in 1987 and was torn down.

From 1896 to 1987, the Sisters of Visitation owned the property and had a prestigious girls' academy on the site.

Future plans include the building of a new chapel and relocation of St. John's parish to the Cardome property as a replacement for their existing downtown structure.
