= Japanese Friendship Garden =

Japanese Friendship Garden is used to describe many gardens including:

- Japanese Friendship Garden (Balboa Park) in San Diego, California
- Japanese Friendship Garden (Kelley Park) in San Jose, California
- Ro Ho En in Phoenix, Arizona
- Nikka Yuko Japanese Garden in Lethbridge, Alberta
- Yuko-En on the Elkhorn, Kentucky-Japan Friendship Garden in Georgetown, Kentucky
- Friendship Garden in Hope, British Columbia
