= Royal Spring Park =

Historic house in Kentucky, United States

- U.S. National Register of Historic Places
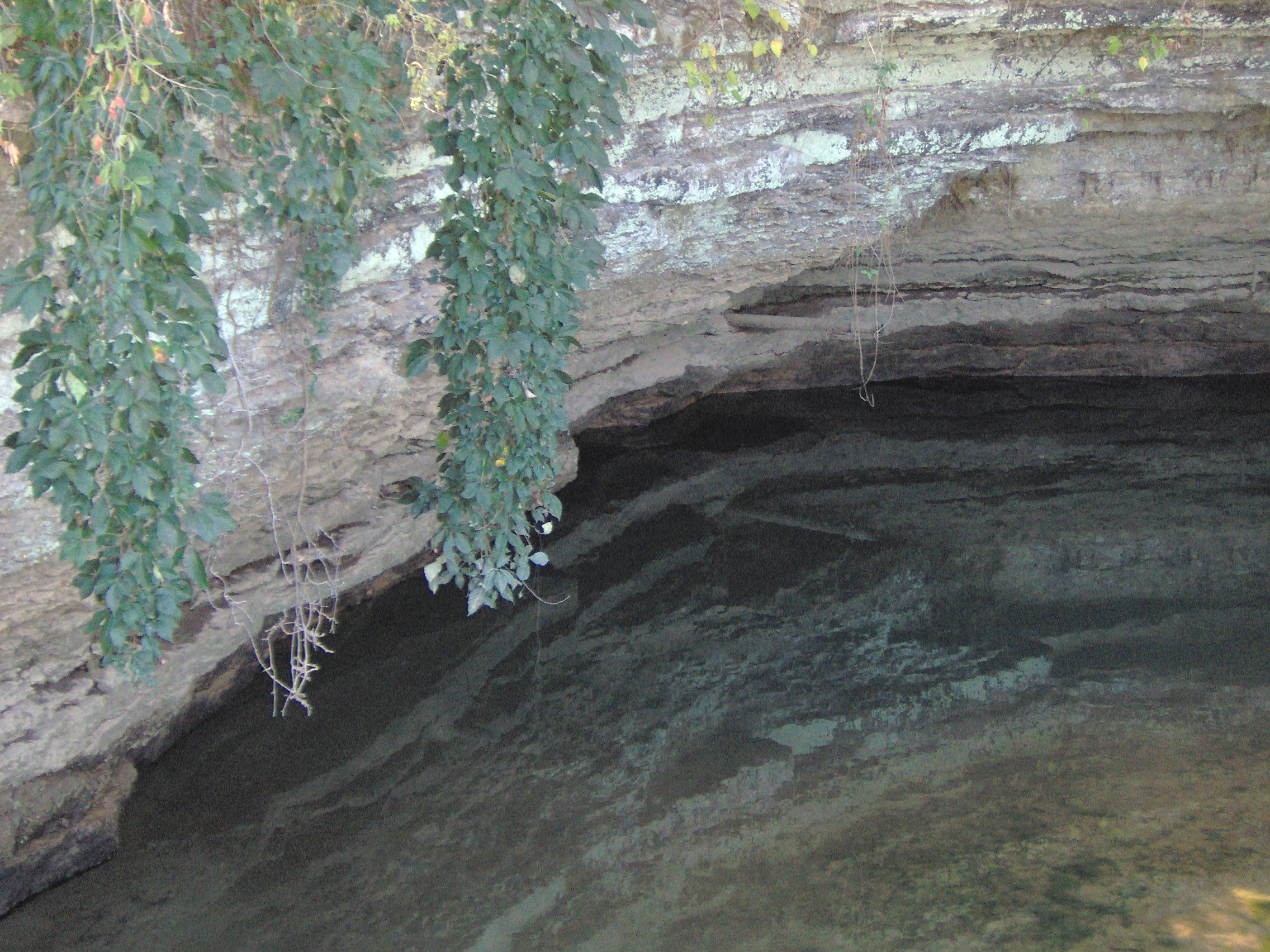
- Royal Spring

- Location within Kentucky Location within the United States
- Location: Between Clinton and Jefferson Sts. W of Water, Broadway, and Georgetown Sts., Georgetown, Kentucky
- Coordinates: 38°12′37″N 84°33′33″W
- Built: 1774
- NRHP reference No.: 73000842
- Added to NRHP: April 02, 1973

Royal Spring Park is the site of a large spring in Georgetown, Kentucky, United States, that since the earliest settlements in the area has provided water for the area. In addition to the spring, the park has a log cabin built by a former slave, Milton Leach. The park was added to the U.S. National Register of Historic Places on April 2, 1973.

== History ==
=== Royal Spring ===
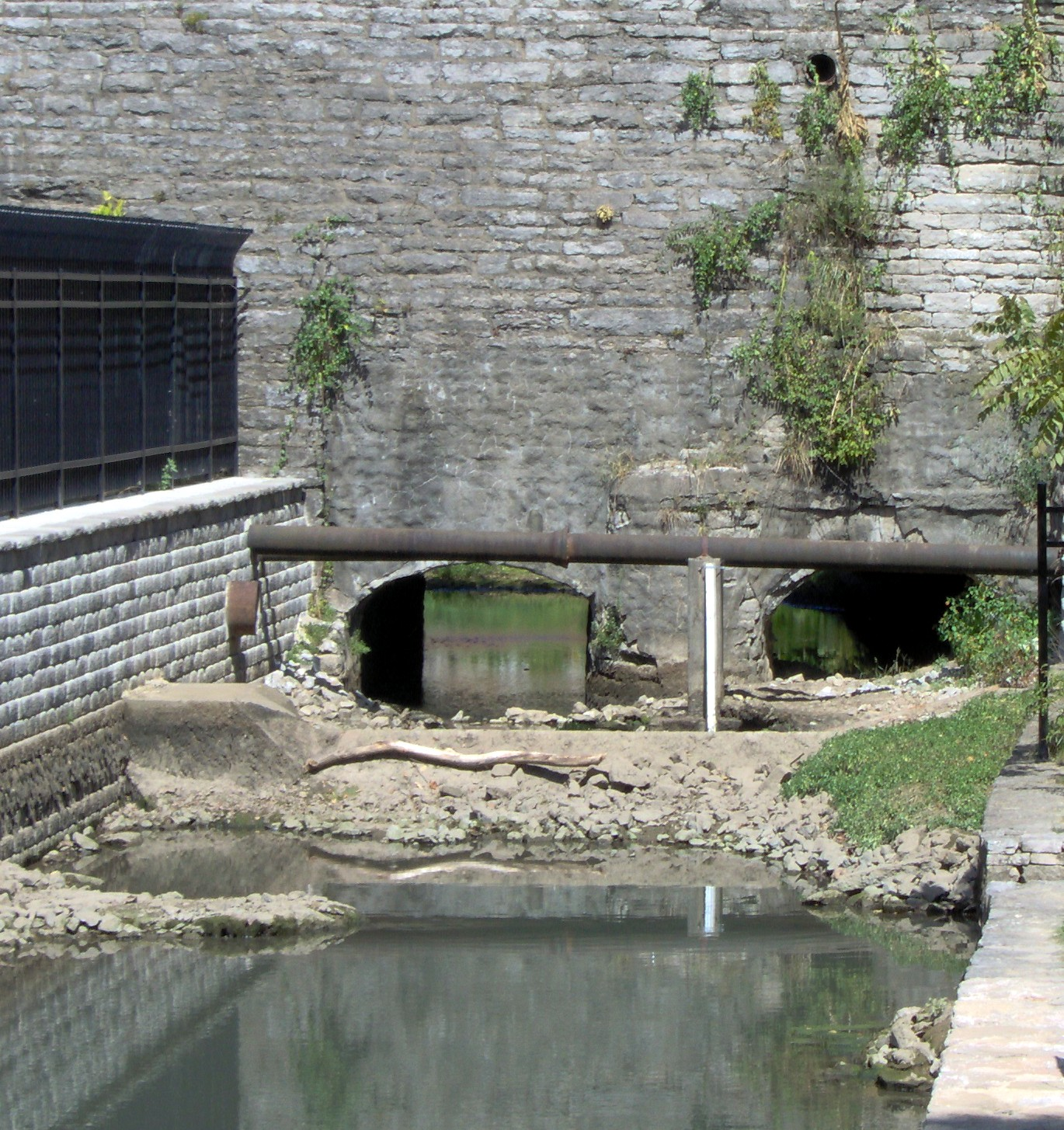
Royal Spring

Royal Spring is a large spring in Georgetown, Kentucky, that has been a main source of water since the first settlements in the area. In 1889, the Georgetown Water Works Company was incorporated, and distributed the spring water until the City of Georgetown purchased that company and established the Municipal Water Works Plant in 1945. Currently, more than 13,000 customers of Georgetown Municipal Water and Sewer Service rely on water from the spring as their primary water supply.

=== Early settlements ===
In 1774 John Floyd of Fincastle County, Virginia led a surveying party into Kentucky to locate land to be used as "compensation for soldier in the French and Indian War". On July 7, 1774, Floyd found the spring and he received it and 1,000 acres (4.0 km^{2}) of land as payment for his surveying work. This spring's earliest known name was "Mr. Floyd's Spring". In October 1775, Floyd transferred ownership of the spring to John McClelland (1745–1776), from Westmoreland County, Pennsylvania, after McClelland surveyed and built a cabin on the land earlier in the year. In 1776 McClelland's Fort, an army outpost was built on a nearby cliff to have close proximity to the spring. The fort was abandoned in 1777 after the Indian attacks increased in frequency and severity.

=== Kentucky Bourbon developed ===
Baptist preacher Elijah Craig set up a grain mill and used the spring water to first distill bourbon whiskey using the sour mash process on this site in 1789. Craig has long been credited with the creation of bourbon though more recent research suggests alternative explanations.

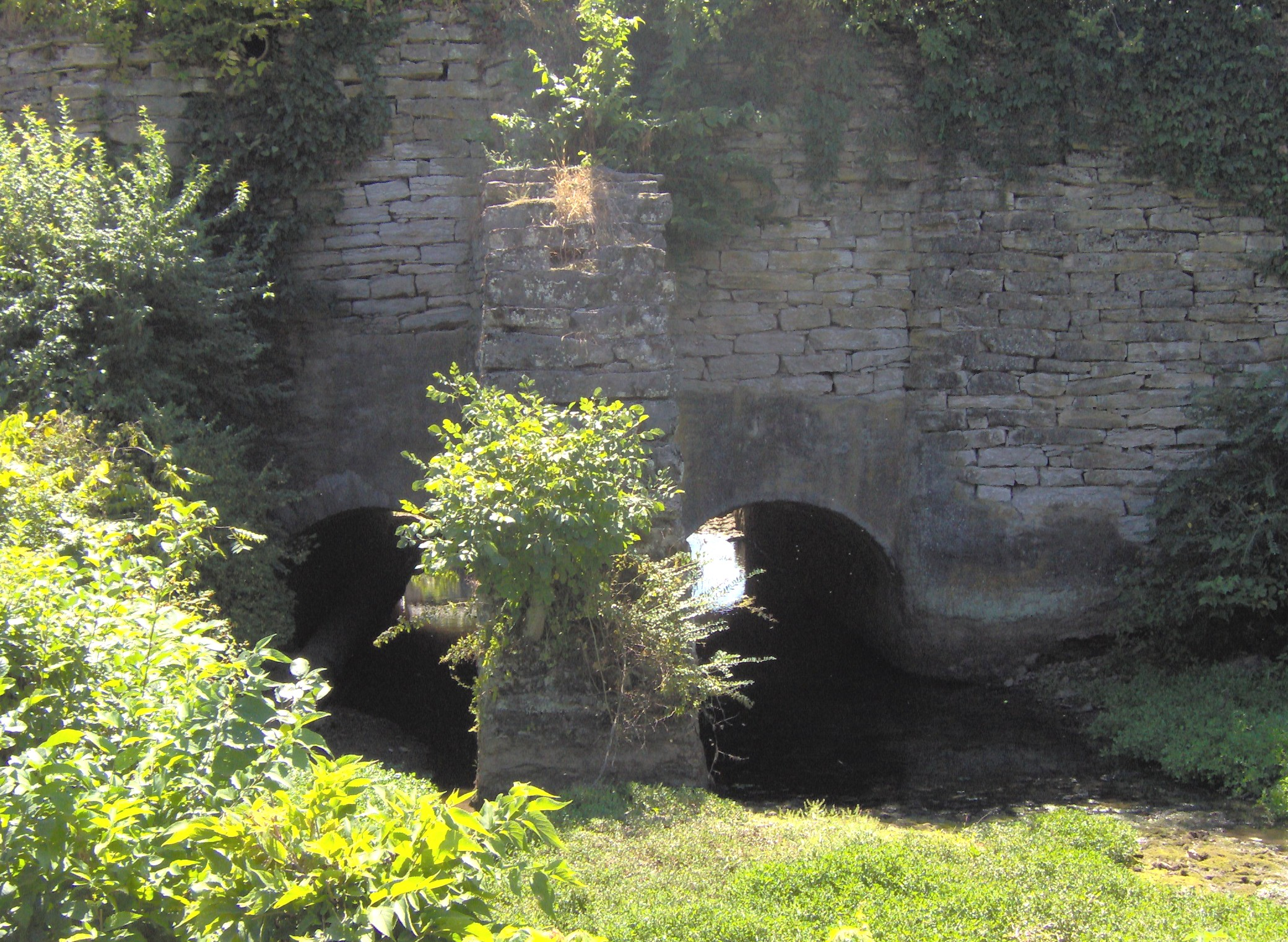
View of Royal Spring from W. Main Street

Royal Spring Park, located off West Main Street (U.S. Route 460) in the downtown area, features an outdoor recreation area, viewing of Royal Spring, and an authentic restored log cabin museum. The site has several historical markers and monuments that give tribute to the spring, early settlers, and local war heroes.

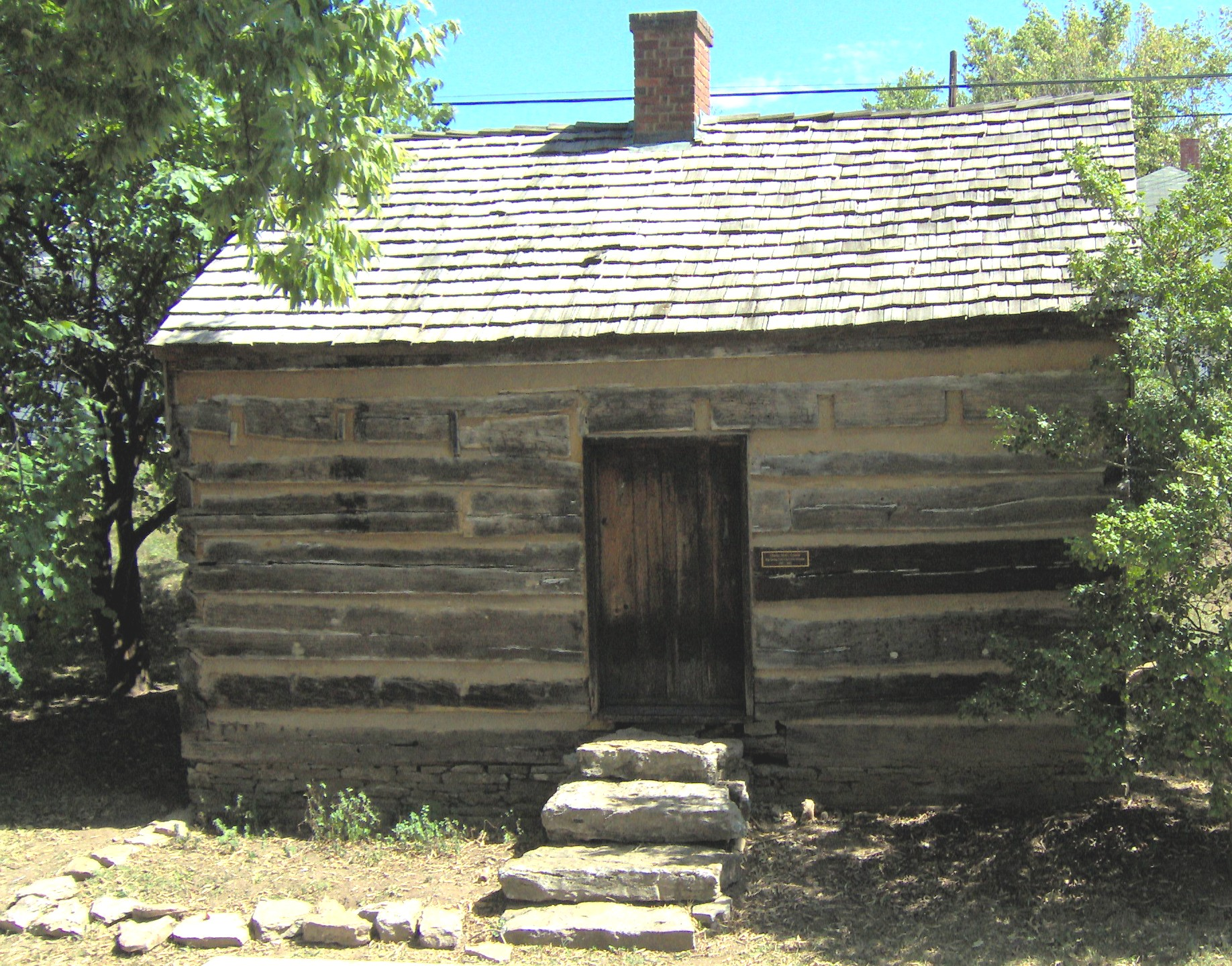
Leach log cabin

The park was added to the U.S. National Register of Historic Places on April 2, 1973.

=== Leach Cabin ===
In 1874, Milton Leach, a former slave, built a log cabin to use as his dwelling. The log cabin was restored and relocated to Royal Spring Park to serve as a museum.
