= Georgetown, Kentucky =

- City
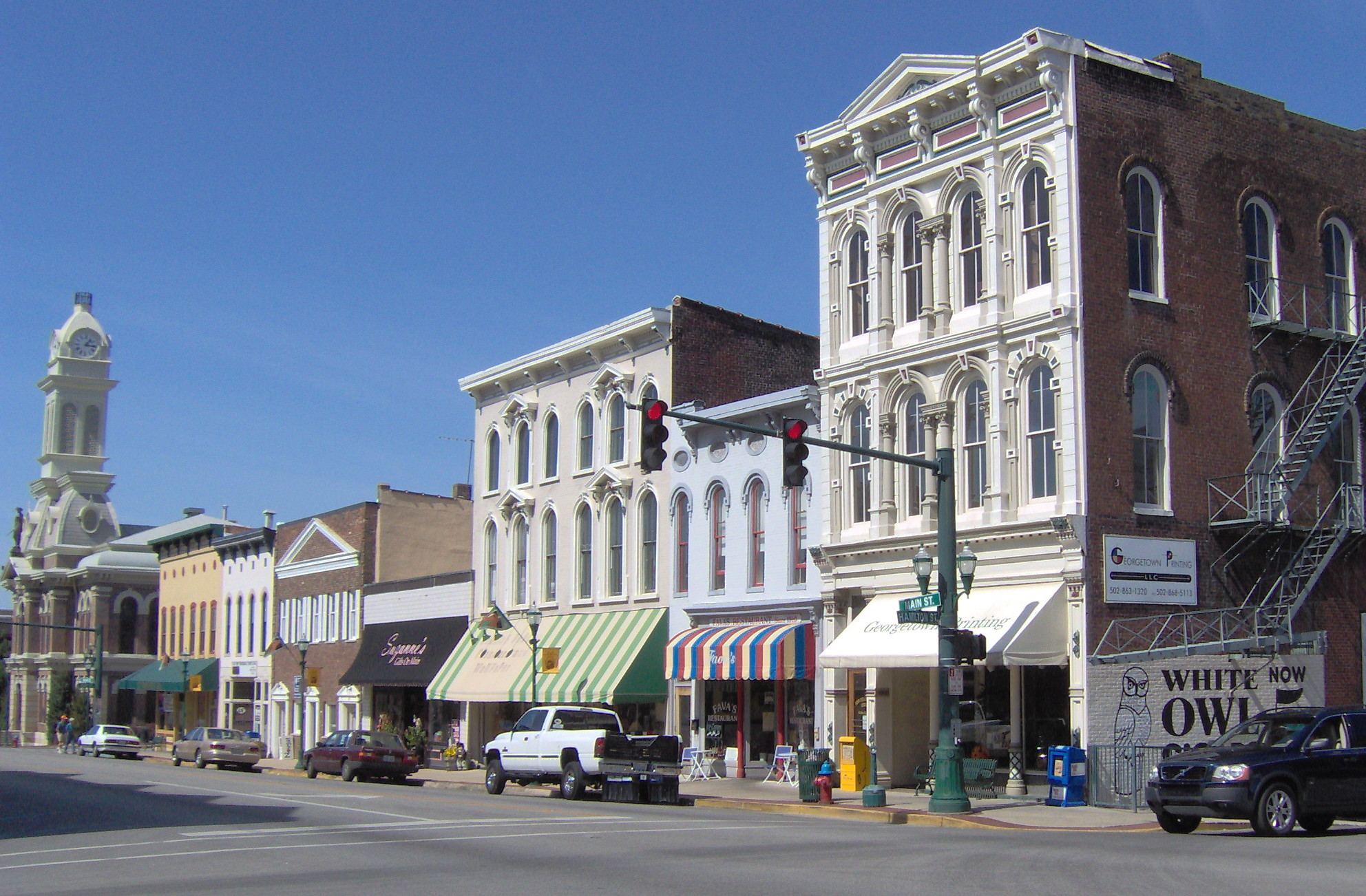

- Nickname: G-Town
- Interactive map of Georgetown, Kentucky
- Location within Kentucky Location within the United States
- Coordinates: 38°12′35″N 84°33′36″W
- Country: United States
- State: Kentucky
- County: Scott
- Established: 1784

Government
  - Mayor: Burney Jenkins

Area
  - City: 17.15 sq mi (44.41 km^{2})
  - Land: 16.98 sq mi (43.99 km^{2})
  - Water: 0.17 sq mi (0.43 km^{2})
- Elevation: 883 ft (269 m)

Population (2020)
  - City: 37,086
  - Estimate (2025): 40,883
  - Rank: US: 1054th KY: 6th
  - Density: 2,183.6/sq mi (843.09/km^{2})
  - Metro: 517,846 (US: 109th)
  - Demonym: Georgetonian
- Time zone: UTC−5 (Eastern)
  - Summer (DST): UTC−4 (EDT)
- ZIP Code: 40324
- Area code: 502
- FIPS code: 021209
- GNIS feature ID: 2403689
- Website: georgetownky.gov

Georgetown is a city in Scott County, Kentucky, United States. The population was 37,086 at the 2020 census. It is the sixth-most populous city in Kentucky. It is the seat of its county. It was originally called Lebanon when founded by Rev. Elijah Craig and was renamed in 1790 in honor of President George Washington. Historically, settlers were drawn to Georgetown for its Royal Spring. Georgetown is a home rule-class city under Kentucky state law.

It is the home of Georgetown College, a private liberal arts college. Georgetown is part of the Lexington-Fayette, KY Metropolitan Statistical Area. At one time the city served as the training camp home for the NFL's Cincinnati Bengals.

The city's growth began in the mid-1980s, when Toyota built Toyota Motor Manufacturing Kentucky, its first wholly owned United States plant, in Georgetown. The plant opened in 1988; it builds the Camry, Lexus ES, and RAV4 models, with the Avalon and Sienna vehicles formerly being built there.

== History ==
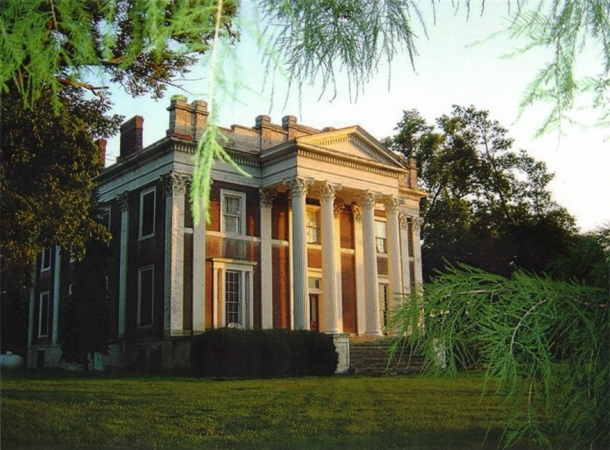
Ward Hall, a Greek Revival landmark

Native peoples have lived along the banks of Elkhorn Creek in what is now Scott County for at least 15,000 years. At the time of European encounter, the historic Shawnee people occupied this area.

Anglo-American exploration can be dated to the late colonial period and a June 1774 surveying expedition from Fincastle County, Virginia, led by Colonel John Floyd. For his military service, he was granted a claim of 1,000 acres (4.0 km^{2}) in the area by the state of Virginia. He named it Royal Spring but did not settle it. John McClellan was the first English colonist to settle the area and established McClellan's Station there in 1775, but the compound was abandoned following an Indian attack on December 29, 1776.

In 1782, the Baptist preacher Elijah Craig led his congregation to the site from Orange County, Virginia, and established a new settlement which he called Lebanon. This was incorporated by the Virginia legislature in 1784. At the time, Virginia claimed this territory under its colonial charter. Craig established some of the first mills west of the Appalachian Mountains along the Royal Spring Branch, where he also manufactured cloth and paper. He also founded a distillery in 1789, as well as a school called the Rittenhouse Academy. This eventually developed as Georgetown College.

The city's name was changed to George Town in honor of President George Washington in 1790. When Kentucky became the 15th U.S. state in 1792 and formed Scott County, George Town became the county seat. Its name was formally changed to Georgetown in 1846.

The county developed an agricultural economy, as it was part of the fertile Bluegrass Region. Planters cultivated tobacco and hemp, and raised blooded livestock, including Thoroughbred racehorses, and cattle and sheep. During the Civil War, Kentucky stayed in the Union. Georgetown was raided by Confederate Gen. John Hunt Morgan twice, once on July 15, 1862, and the second time on July 10, 1864.

Following the war, the town became a railroad hub, connected to the Cincinnati Southern, the Louisville Southern, and the Frankfort & Cincinnati. The last was considered the "whiskey route" and carried much of the region's bourbon to markets along the Ohio River.

In 1896 a girl's academy was founded by the Catholic Sisters of Visitation. The school closed in 1987, and was adapted as the Cardome Centre. It previously served as a community center for the city of Georgetown, but was purchased by the Catholic Diocese of Lexington in 2019.

=== 20th century to present ===
Throughout the 20th century, Georgetown has been in transition from an economy based primarily on agriculture, to one mixing manufacturing, small business, and the family farm. During the 1960s, the construction of Interstate 75 placed the city on one of the nation's busiest highways. The selection of Georgetown as the site of Toyota Motor Manufacturing Kentucky in 1985 has resulted in the greatest period of growth in the city's history.

The historic Ward Hall, now home to The Ward Hall Preservation Foundation, is located just outside Georgetown. Ward Hall was the summer home of Junius Ward. The home represents the height of the Greek Revival period of architecture in Kentucky and is listed on the National Register of Historic Places (NRHP).

The Georgetown business section has a historic district known as the Oxford Historic District. It is also listed on the NRHP.

== Geography ==
Georgetown is located north of Lexington in the Bluegrass region of the state. Major highways that run through the city include Interstate 75 and US Routes 25, 62, and 460. Numerous state highways run through the city. I-75 runs to the east of downtown, with access from exits 125, 126, 127, and 129. Via I-75, downtown Lexington is 16 mi (26 km) south, and Cincinnati, Ohio is 69 mi (111 km) north. US 25 runs through the center of town, leading south to Lexington and north 22 mi (35 km) to Corinth. US 62 runs along the southern and eastern part of the city as a bypass, leading northeast 21 mi (34 km) to Cynthiana and southwest 11 mi (18 km) to Midway. US 460 runs east−west through the town, leading east 17 mi (27 km) to Paris and west 18 mi (29 km) to Frankfort, the state capital.

According to the United States Census Bureau, the city has a total area of 15.85 square miles (41 km^{2}), all land.

=== Climate ===
Georgetown has a humid subtropical climate (Köppen Cfa), with warm summers up to 30 °C (86 °F) and moderately cold winters as low as −4 °C (25 °F). Precipitation is relatively well spread (although the late spring and summer months are typically wetter), with an average of 45.28 in (1,150 mm).

Climate data for Georgetown, Kentucky
Month	Jan	Feb	Mar	Apr	May	Jun	Jul	Aug	Sep	Oct	Nov	Dec	Year
Mean daily maximum °F (°C)	41 (5)	46 (8)	55 (13)	66 (19)	74 (23)	83 (28)	86 (30)	86 (30)	79 (26)	68 (20)	55 (13)	44 (7)	65 (18)
Mean daily minimum °F (°C)	25 (−4)	28 (−2)	36 (2)	45 (7)	54 (12)	63 (17)	66 (19)	65 (18)	58 (14)	47 (8)	37 (3)	28 (−2)	46 (8)
Average precipitation inches (mm)	3.20 (81)	3.31 (84)	4.07 (103)	3.60 (91)	5.26 (134)	4.44 (113)	4.65 (118)	3.25 (83)	2.91 (74)	3.13 (80)	3.53 (90)	3.93 (100)	45.28 (1,150)
Source: The Weather Channel

== Demographics ==
Historical population
Census	Pop.	Note	%±
1800	348		—
1810	529		52.0%
1830	1,344		—
1840	1,511		12.4%
1860	1,684		—
1870	1,570		−6.8%
1880	2,061		31.3%
1900	3,823		—
1910	4,533		18.6%
1920	3,903		−13.9%
1930	4,229		8.4%
1940	4,420		4.5%
1950	5,516		24.8%
1960	6,986		26.6%
1970	8,629		23.5%
1980	10,972		27.2%
1990	11,414		4.0%
2000	18,080		58.4%
2010	29,098		60.9%
2020	37,086		27.5%
2025 (est.)	40,883		10.2%
U.S. Decennial Census; 2020 Census

=== 2020 census ===
As of the 2020 census, Georgetown had a population of 37,086. The median age was 33.1 years. 26.5% of residents were under the age of 18 and 10.9% of residents were 65 years of age or older. For every 100 females there were 95.3 males, and for every 100 females age 18 and over there were 92.1 males age 18 and over.

99.6% of residents lived in urban areas, while 0.4% lived in rural areas.

There were 13,979 households in Georgetown, of which 38.3% had children under the age of 18 living in them. Of all households, 48.9% were married-couple households, 17.6% were households with a male householder and no spouse or partner present, and 25.8% were households with a female householder and no spouse or partner present. About 25.0% of all households were made up of individuals and 8.2% had someone living alone who was 65 years of age or older.

There were 14,800 housing units, of which 5.5% were vacant. The homeowner vacancy rate was 1.8% and the rental vacancy rate was 7.1%.

Racial composition as of the 2020 census
Race	Number	Percent
White	30,620	82.6%
Black or African American	2,586	7.0%
American Indian and Alaska Native	126	0.3%
Asian	492	1.3%
Native Hawaiian and Other Pacific Islander	17	0.0%
Some other race	743	2.0%
Two or more races	2,502	6.7%
Hispanic or Latino (of any race)	1,964	5.3%

=== 2010 census ===
As of the census of 2010, there were 29,098 people 10,733 households, and 7,452 families in the city. The population density was 1,836.4 per square mile (709.0/km^{2}). There were 11,957 housing units. The racial makeup of the city was 87.5% White, 7.0% African American, 0.3% Native American, 1.2% Asian, 0.0% Pacific Islander, 1.9% from other races, and 2.1% from two or more races. Hispanics or Latinos of any race were 4.3% of the population.

There were 10,733 households, out of which 38.1% had children under the age of 18 living with them, 49.6% were married couples living together, 14.9% had a female householder with no husband present, and 30.6% were non-families. 24.9% of all households were made up of individuals, and 6.6% had someone living alone who was 65 years of age or older. The average household size was 2.59 and the average family size was 3.09.

The age distribution was 27.9% under 18 and 8.3% who were 65 or older. The median age was 31.7 years. The median income for a household in the city was $51,692. The per capita income for the city was $24,376. About 13.9% of the population was below the poverty line.

== Economy ==
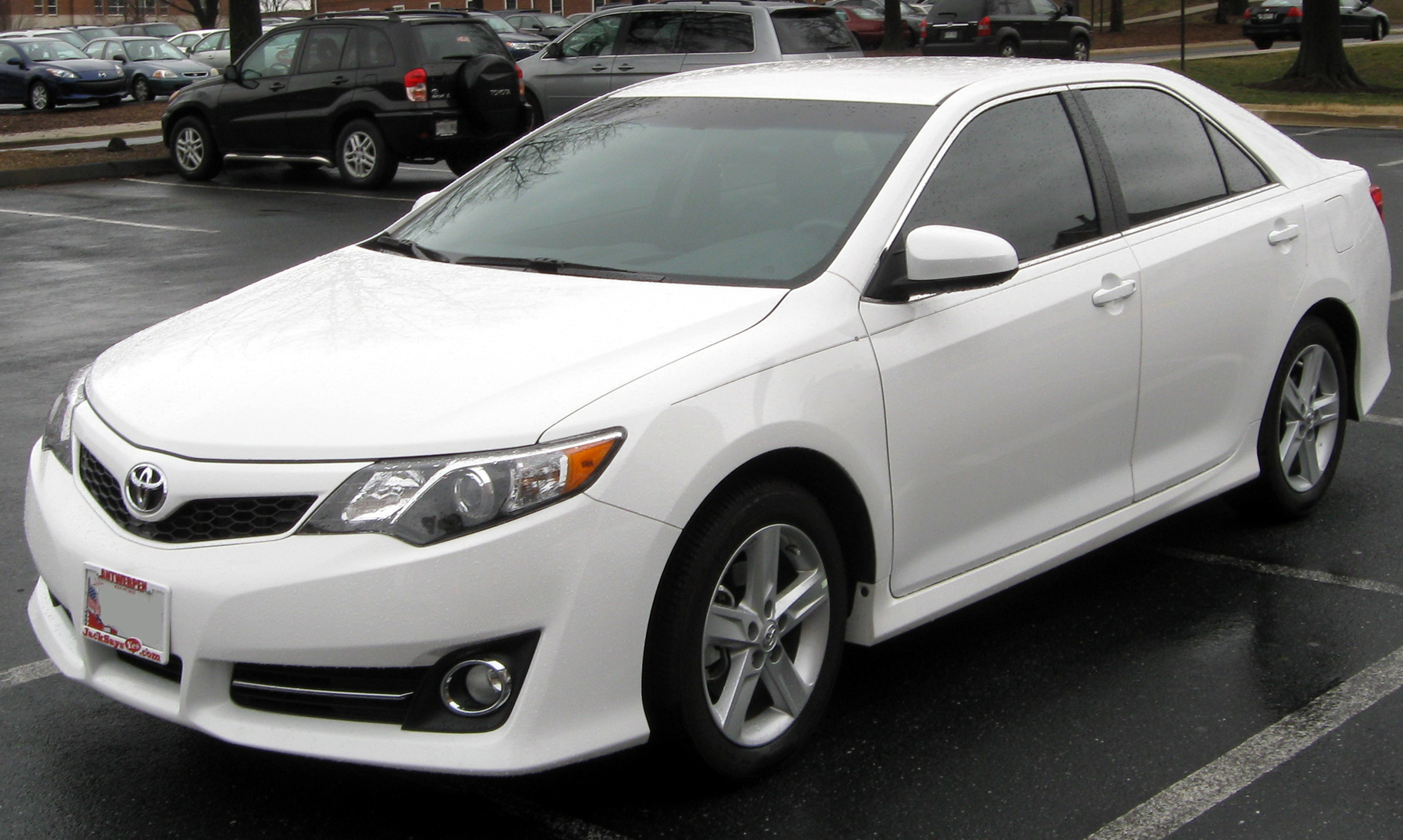
The best selling car in the United States, the Toyota Camry, is manufactured in Georgetown

=== Top employers ===
According to the city's 2018 Comprehensive Annual Financial Report, the largest employers in the city are:

#	Employer	# of Employees
1	Toyota Motor Manufacturing Kentucky	10,019
2	Scott County Schools	1,219
3	Adient	743
4	Toyota Production Engineering and Manufacturing Center	740
5	Georgetown Community Hospital	460
6	Toyota Tsusho	413
7	Kroger	395
8	Aichi Forge USA	380
9	International Crankshaft	335
10	Walmart	335

== Sports ==
Georgetown is home to Toyota Stadium. Toyota Stadium hosts Georgetown College's Football Team. The city used to host Lexington SC, of the USL Championship before they moved to Lexington SC Stadium.

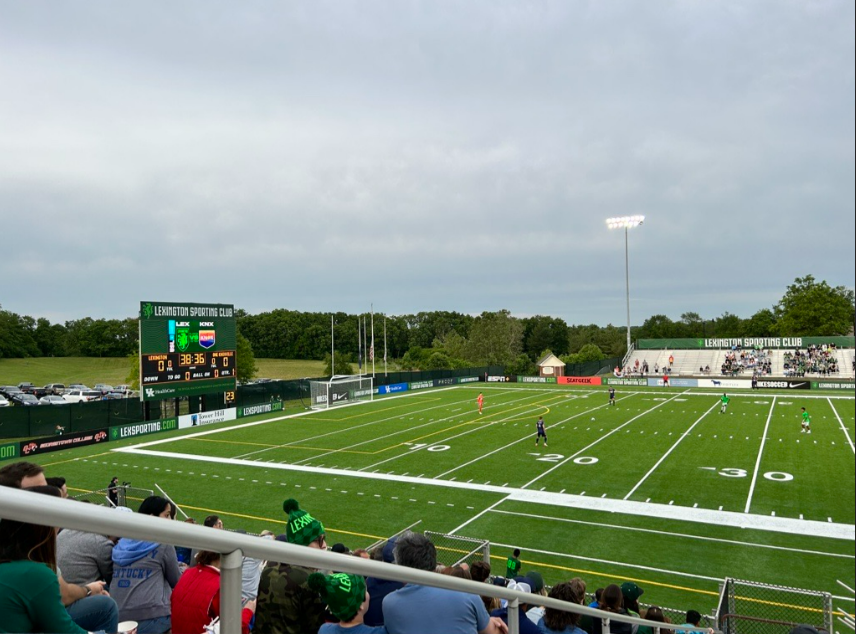
Toyota Stadium during a Lexington SC game.

== Education ==
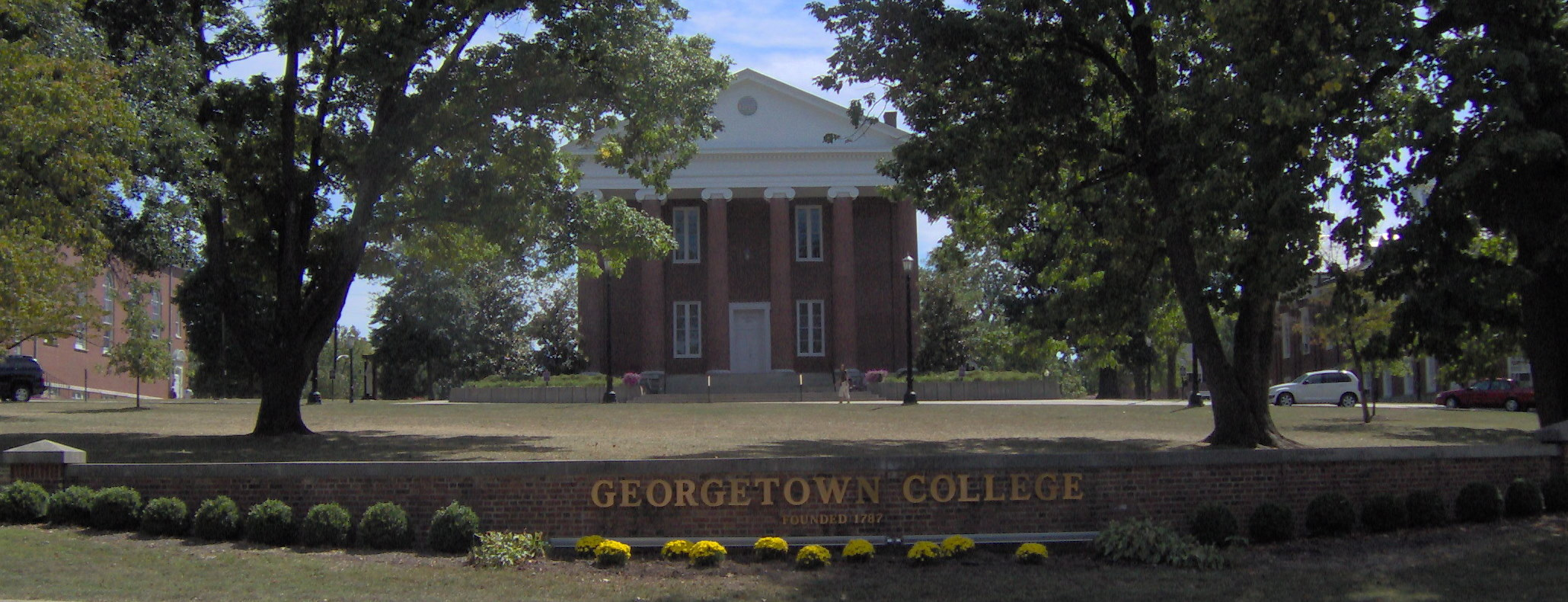
Giddings Hall on campus of Georgetown College.

Georgetown College is a private liberal arts college located in the downtown area of Georgetown. Baptist Seminary of Kentucky is a seminary in Georgetown.

Public education in Georgetown and Scott County consists of a preschool center serving special needs and economically at-risk students aged 3–5, nine elementary schools (grades K–5), three middle schools (grades 6–8) and two high schools (grades 9–12). These schools are all part of the Scott County Schools system. Plans had been in progress for an additional high school and middle school within the city limits during the 2010s due to the expanding population. The district chose not to build a new middle school, opting instead to expand one of its three existing middle schools, but opened a new high school and a new elementary school in 2019. Elkhorn Crossing School, which had been a detached campus of Scott County High before the 2019 opening of Great Crossing High School, provides some sophomores and juniors at both high schools with a curriculum that integrates academic and career-based disciplines.

Public schools located within Georgetown and Scott County include:

- Creekside Elementary School
- Garth Elementary
- Northern Elementary
- Southern Elementary
- Eastern Elementary
- Western Elementary
- Anne Mason Elementary
- Stamping Ground Elementary
- Lemons Mill Elementary
- Royal Spring Middle School
- Georgetown Middle School
- Scott County Middle School
- Great Crossing High School
- Scott County High School
- Phoenix Horizon Academy

Private education in Georgetown and Scott County includes St. John elementary and middle school, Providence Christian Academy elementary and middle school, and Keystone Montessori elementary school.

Georgetown also has a lending library, the Scott County Public Library.

== Media ==
Georgetown's newspaper, the Georgetown News-Graphic, prints on Tuesday and Friday. Residents of the area commonly subscribe to this locally geared newspaper in addition to the larger Lexington daily newspaper, the Lexington Herald-Leader.

Z-Rock 103.3 FM WXZZ Georgetown is a 24/7/365 classic rock/new rock radio station.

== Infrastructure ==
=== Healthcare ===
Georgetown has one hospital, Georgetown Community Hospital, operated by LifePoint Health.

UK HealthCare and Baptist Health Lexington have regional campuses in Georgetown. Georgetown also has many nursing facilities, including Signature HealthCARE of Georgetown, Windsor Gardens Retirement Community, Dover Manor Nursing Home, and Ashton Grove Assisted Living.

== Notable people ==
- William E. Applegate (1851–1928) – thoroughbred bookmaker, breeder, racer and track owner. Born in Georgetown.
- Mike Ayers (1948– ) – former football coach for East Tennessee State University and Wofford College
- Benjamin Franklin Bradley (1825−1897) – politician, representative to the Confederate States Congress from Kentucky. Born in Georgetown.
- Mary Cyrene Burch Breckinridge (1826–1907) – wife of Vice President John C. Breckinridge. Born in Georgetown.
- Stephen G. Burbridge (1831–1894) – U.S. Army major general during the Civil War. Born in Georgetown.
- Benjamin T. Cable (1853–1923) – politician, US Representative from Illinois. Born in Georgetown.
- J. Campbell Cantrill (1870–1923) – politician, US Representative from Kentucky. Born in Georgetown.
- James E. Cantrill (1839–1908) – politician, Lt. Governor of Kentucky, judge
- Jean Murrell Capers (1913−2017) - Ohio state judge and Cleveland City Council member. Born in Georgetown.
- Patricia Cooksey (1958– ) – jockey and horse racing commentator
- Joe Cowley (baseball) (1958– ) – former Major League Baseball pitcher, who threw a no-hitter
- Elijah Craig (1738−1808) – early Baptist preacher, educator and entrepreneur; worked on protecting religious freedom with James Madison of Virginia
- Basil W. Duke (1838−1916) – lawyer and Confederate general officer during the Civil War. Born in Georgetown.
- Sandford C. Faulkner (1803–1874) – composer of the song "The Arkansas Traveler". Born in Georgetown.
- James Marion Frost (1848–1916) – pastor and author. Born in Georgetown.
- A. W. Hamilton (1980− ) – head men's basketball coach at Eastern Kentucky University
- William H. Hatch (1833−1896) – politician, US Representative from Missouri. Born in Georgetown.
- John Hunter Herndon (1813–1878) – Texas lawyer, judge and railroad president. Born in Georgetown.
- Harrison E. Howe (1881–1942) – chemical engineer, editor and author. Born in Georgetown.
- Tom L. Johnson (1854−1911) – US Representative from Ohio 1891–95, Mayor of Cleveland 1901–1909. Born in Georgetown.
- James McHall Jones (1823–1851) – US District Judge. Born in Georgetown.
- Larry D (1984– ) – professional wrestler and promoter
- Broadus Mitchell (1892–1988) – historian, author and professor. Born in Georgetown.
- Fountain E. Pitts (1808–1874) – influential Methodist minister. Born in Georgetown.
- Charles Edward Pogue (1950– ) – screenwriter, playwright and actor
- Dale Polley (1965– ) – former Major League Baseball pitcher
- Phillip Pratt (1955– ) – politician in the Kentucky House of Representatives from the 62nd district
- Clifton Blackburn Prewitt (1826–1902) real estate developer, formerly enslaved
- Ryan Quarles (1983– ) – president, Kentucky Community and Technical College System, former two-term Kentucky Commissioner of Agriculture, former state representative, 2023 candidate for governor
- Dallas Robinson (1982– ) − 2014 Olympian-soldier; sole Olympian from Kentucky in the Sochi Russia Games
- James Fisher Robinson (1800−1882) – politician, 22nd Governor of Kentucky. Federal governor during the Civil War. Cardome in Georgetown was his family home.
- John McCracken Robinson (1794−1893) – politician, US Senator from Illinois. Born in Georgetown.
- Jackson Showalter (1859–1935) – five-time U.S. chess champion
- Nellie Showalter (1870–1946) – American women's chess champion
- Gustavus Woodson Smith (1821−1896) – General in the Confederate Army during the Civil War; Confederate Secretary of War in 1862
- Hayden Stevenson (1877–1952) – film actor. Born in Georgetown.
- Barton W. Stone (1772−1844) – Presbyterian and Restorationist preacher of the Second Great Awakening
- Steve Zahn (1967− ) – actor; lives on a farm in Scott County.

== Photo gallery ==
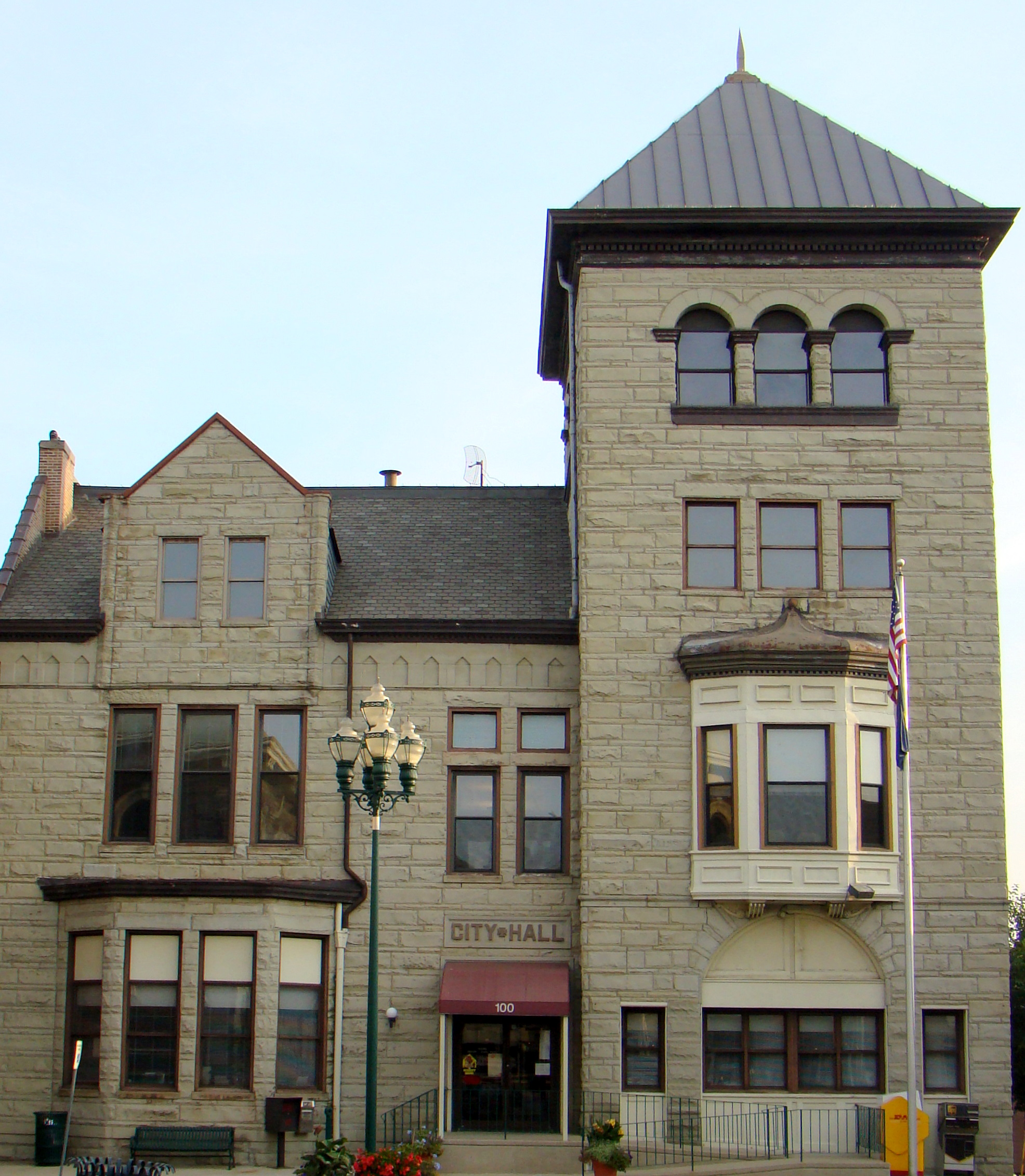
Georgetown City Hall

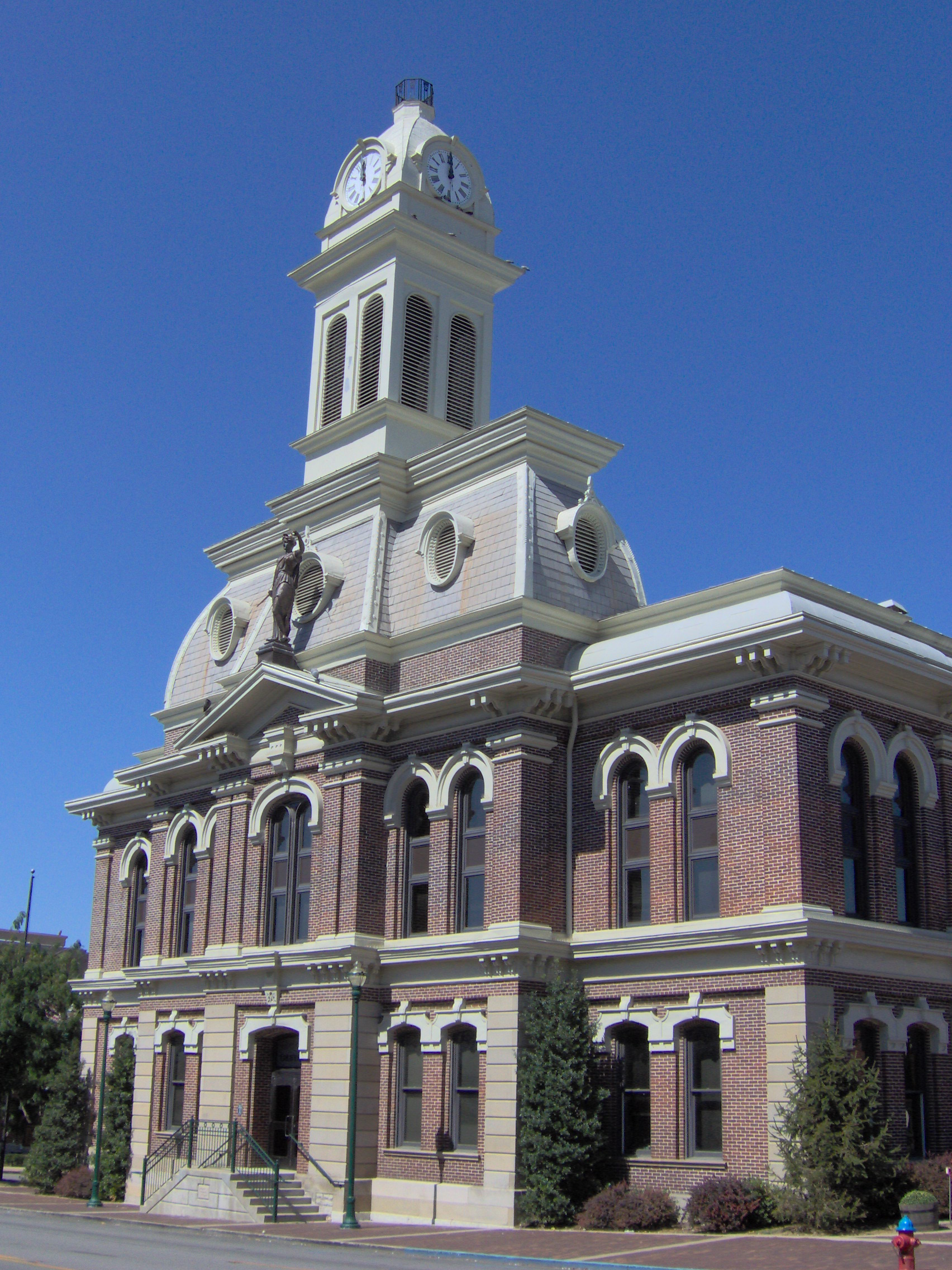
Scott County Courthouse

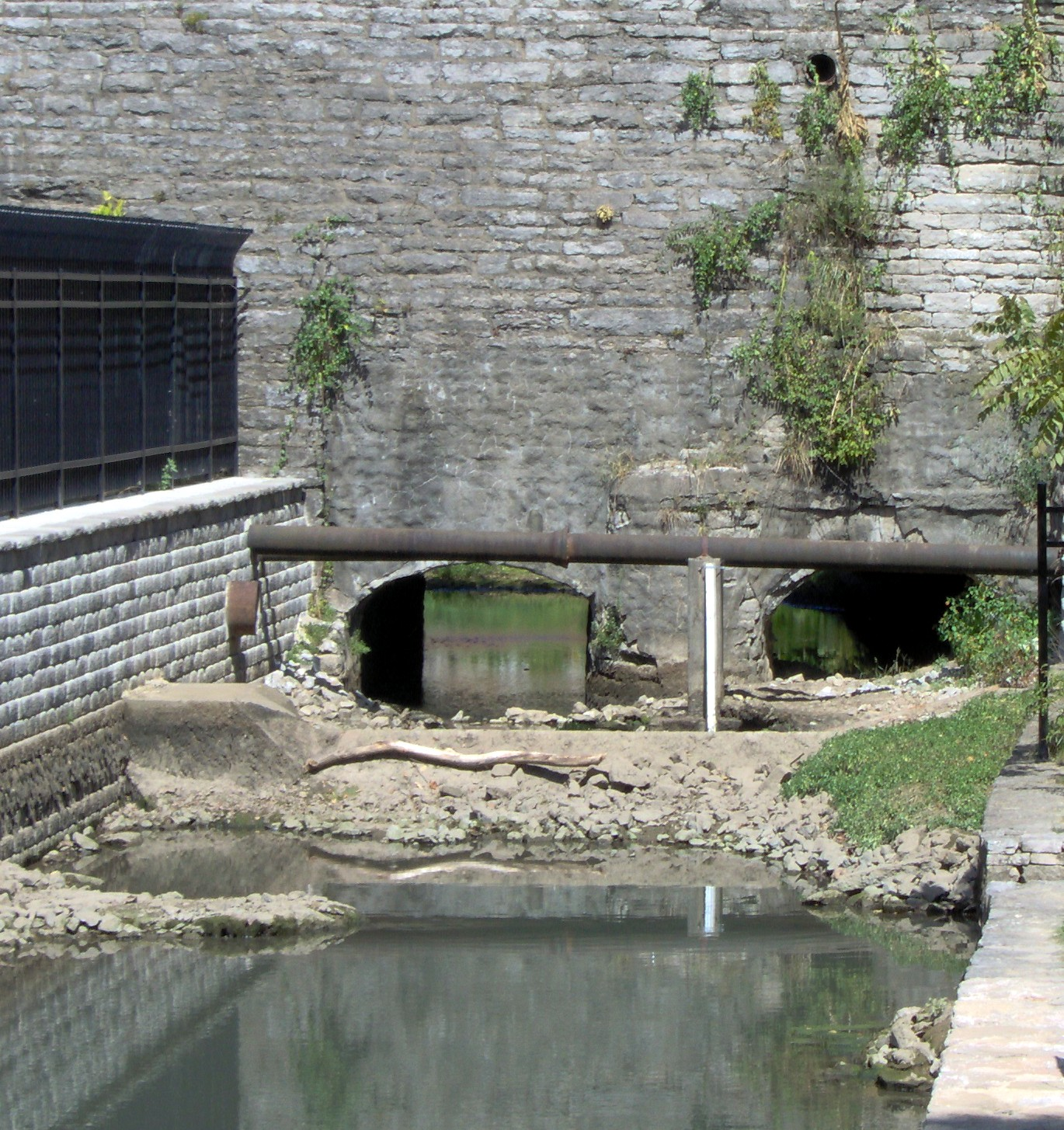
Royal Spring

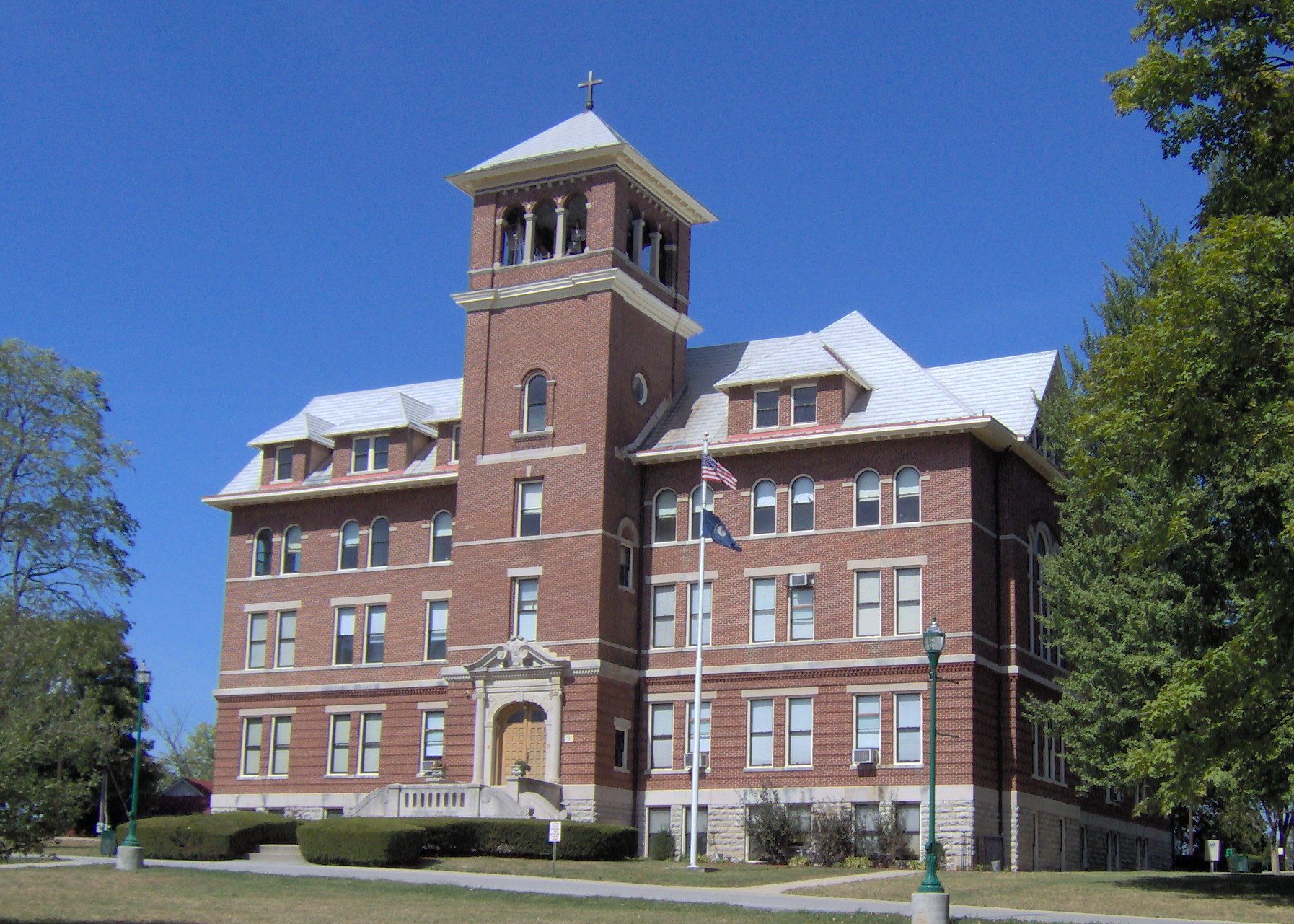
Cardome Centre

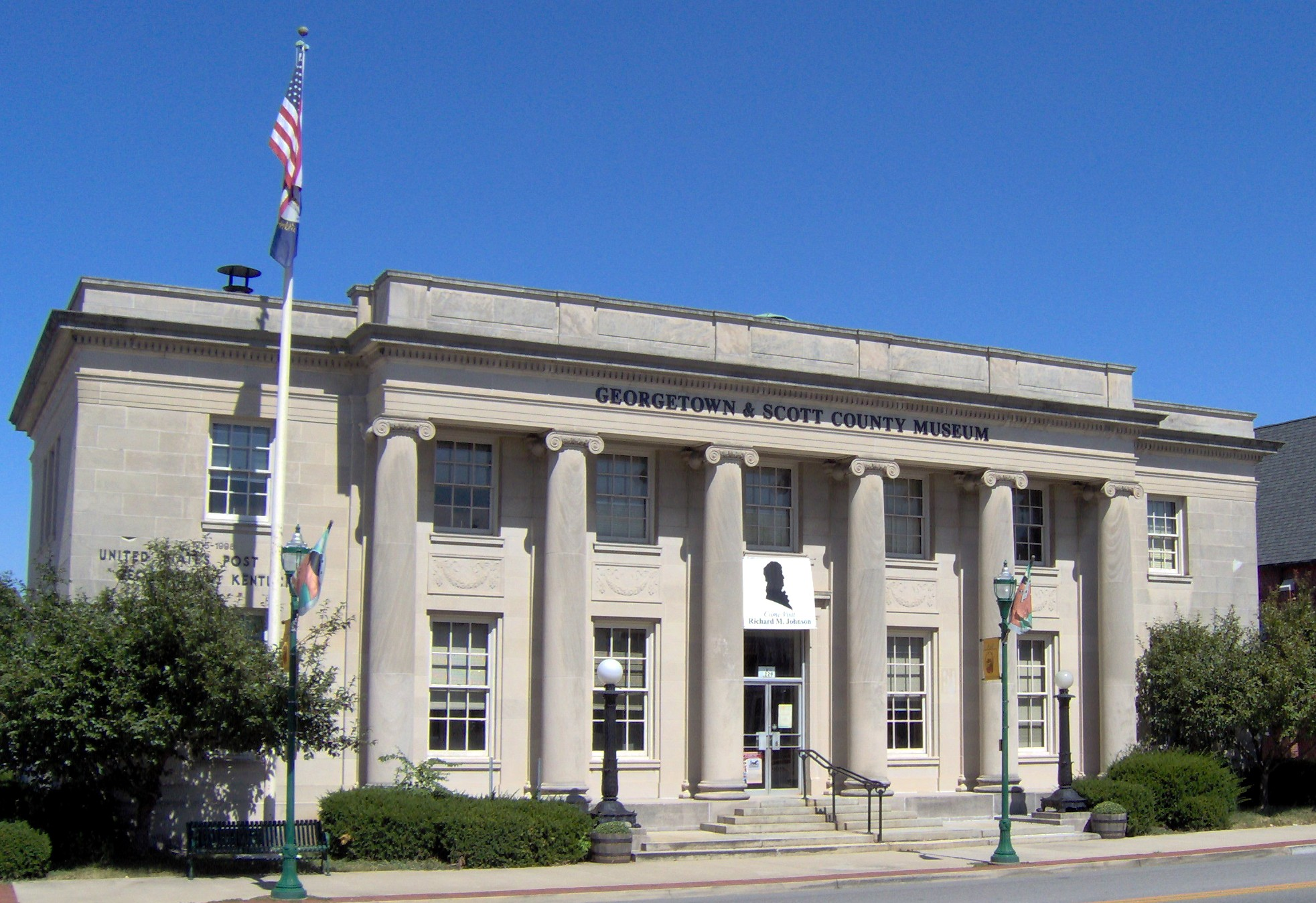
Georgetown & Scott County Museum

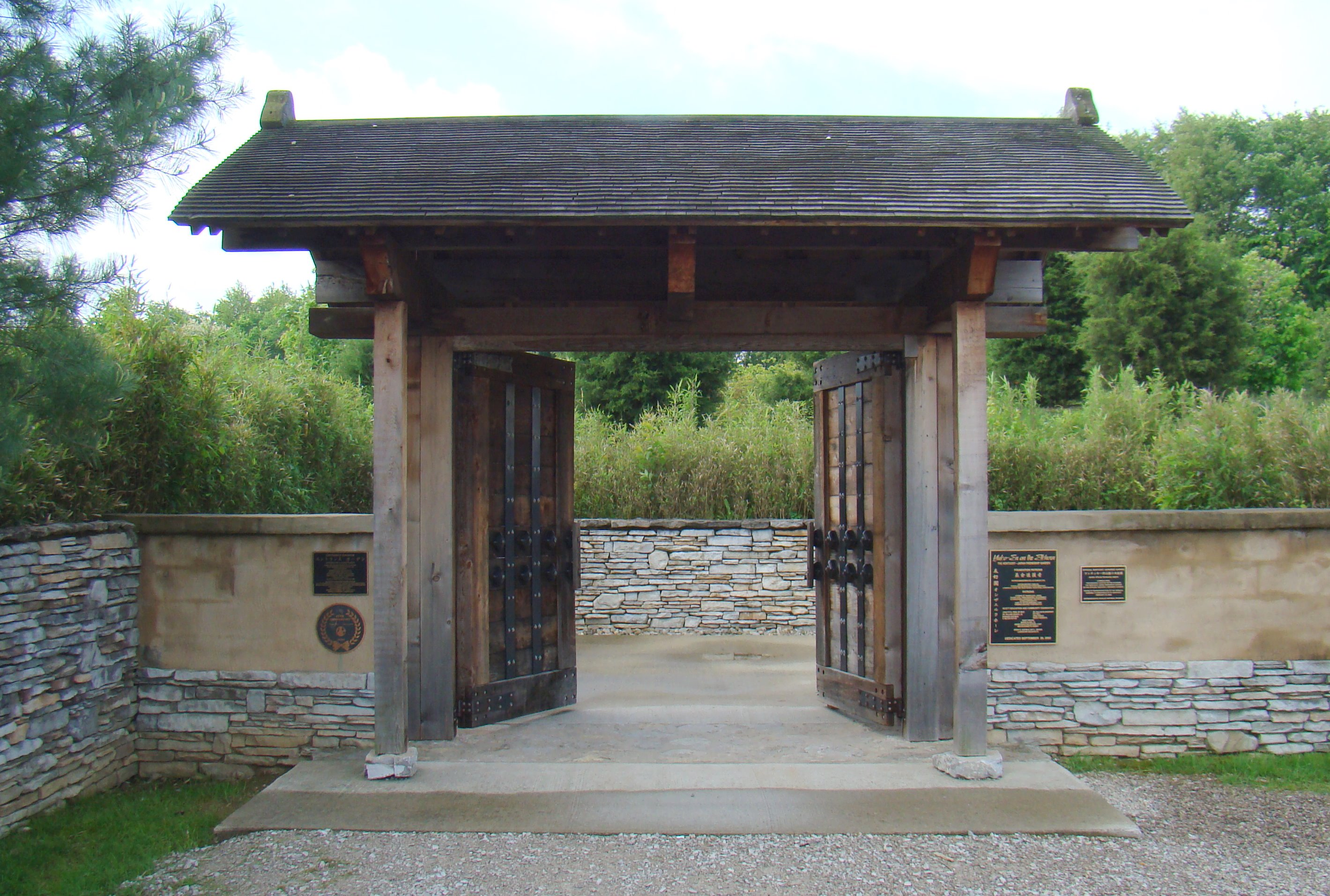
Yuko-En on the Elkhorn

== Sister city ==
Georgetown has one sister city, as designated by Sister Cities International:

- Tahara, Aichi, Japan
