= James Fisher Robinson =

Governor of Kentucky

James F. Robinson
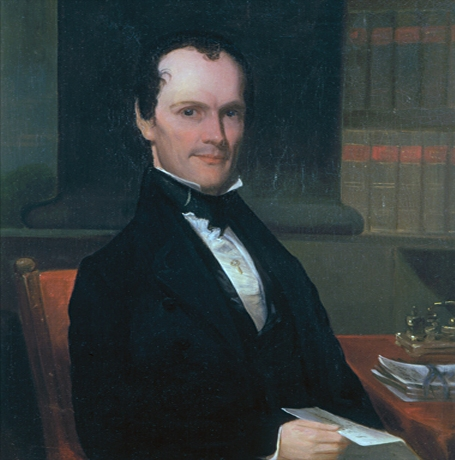

22nd Governor of Kentucky
- In office August 18, 1862 – September 1, 1863
- Lieutenant: Vacant
- Preceded by: Beriah Magoffin
- Succeeded by: Thomas E. Bramlette

Member of the Kentucky Senate
- In office August 5, 1861 – August 7, 1865
- Preceded by: John F. Fisk (redistricting)
- Succeeded by: William A. Dudley
- Constituency: 27th district
- In office August 4, 1851 – August 1, 1853
- Preceded by: Elihu Hogan
- Succeeded by: D. Howard Smith
- Constituency: 31st district

Personal details
- Born: October 4, 1800 Scott County, Kentucky, US
- Died: October 31, 1882 (aged 82) Scott County, Kentucky, US
- Party: Democrat; Whig
- Spouse(s): Susan Mansell; Willina Herndon; Caroline Hening
- Relations: Brother of John McCracken Robinson
- Profession: Lawyer, farmer

James Fisher Robinson (October 4, 1800 – October 31, 1882) was the 22nd governor of Kentucky, serving the remainder of the unfinished term of Governor Beriah Magoffin. Magoffin, a Confederate sympathizer, became increasingly ineffective after the elections of 1861 yielded a supermajority to pro-Union politicians in both houses of the Kentucky General Assembly. Magoffin agreed to resign the governorship, provided he could select his successor. He selected Robinson.

Politically, Robinson opposed both secession and abolition. Though he had Union sympathies, he was considered a moderate, opposing both fugitive slave laws and the enlistment of black soldiers. As a state senator, he supported the Crittenden Compromise and opposed the Civil War. As governor, he drew criticism from the administration of President Abraham Lincoln for opposing the Emancipation Proclamation.

== Early life ==
Robinson was born to Jonathan and Jane Black Robinson in Scott County, Kentucky on October 4, 1800. His early studies were done under a private tutor, then under Presbyterian minister Robert Marshall. He was of English and Scottish descent. He attended Forest Hill Academy and Transylvania University, graduating in 1818. His brother, John McCracken Robinson graduated in the same class and moved to Illinois, where he eventually served two terms as a U.S. Senator. James Robinson studied law under William T. Barry, and was admitted to the bar, beginning his practice in Georgetown, Kentucky.

On December 29, 1821, Robinson married Susan Mansell of Georgetown, the first of his three wives. Mansell and Robinson had two children, a son and a daughter, before Mansell died in 1835. Robinson married Willina S. Herndon of Scott County on March 21, 1839. The couple had eight children, seven of whom survived to adulthood. Herndon died in 1861.

== Political career ==
Robinson's political career began in 1851, when he was elected to the Kentucky Senate as a Whig without opposition. He did not immediately seek re-election, but was again elected to the state Senate in 1861 over challenger James B. Beck. He was elected Speaker of the Senate on September 2, 1861, but resigned the post only a few days later.

Robinson again assumed the position as Speaker of the Senate on August 16, 1862, as part of a political deal to effect the resignation of Governor Beriah Magoffin. Magoffin's lieutenant governor, Linn Boyd, had died in office in 1859, and Magoffin was unwilling to allow John Fisk, then Senate Speaker and next in line for the governorship, to succeed him. Magoffin agreed to resign if the Senate would elect Robinson as Speaker, putting him next in line for the governorship. This was done, and at 10:00 am on August 18, 1862, Robinson succeeded Magoffin upon the latter's resignation. Because he never resigned from the Senate, Robinson technically held both his legislative seat and the governorship concurrently.

The Civil War was ongoing during Robinson's administration. During Robinson's tenure, the Confederacy made its major advance into the Commonwealth. In an attempt to protect the citizens of the Commonwealth, Robinson raised taxes in an effort to revive Kentucky's state militia. He was also concerned with the effect the war had on public education in the state. He asked the General Assembly to investigate the condition of state schools, especially in war-ravaged areas, and encouraged them to accept the Lincoln administration's offer of land to establish an agricultural and mechanical college.

Robinson proudly noted that by January 1, 1863, a divided Kentucky had still managed to send 44,000 soldiers – fifty-one regiments – to aid the Union cause. At the same time, he lamented what he perceived as poor treatment of the state as disloyal by the Federal government. He cited examples such as the declaration of martial law in the Commonwealth and the suspension of the right of habeas corpus for its citizens. He answered President Lincoln's contention "that military necessity is not to be measured by Constitutional limits" by warning "If military necessity is not to be measured by Constitutional limits, we are no longer a free people."

On completion of his term, Robinson supported his eventual successor, Thomas E. Bramlette. The constitutional questions Robinson raised during his administration shaped much of the political debate for Bramlette's term.

== Later life and death ==
Following his term as governor, Robinson retired to "Cardome," his family farm in Scott County. Politically, he became more distant from the national administration, supporting George B. McClellan for president in 1864. He served as president of the Farmers' Bank of Georgetown and chair of the Georgetown College Board of Trustees. On December 1, 1873, he married his third wife, Caroline "Carrie" Hening of Georgetown, who was 36 years his junior. He died on October 31, 1882, and is buried in the Georgetown Cemetery in Georgetown, Kentucky.

== See also ==
- Kentucky in the Civil War

Political offices
Preceded by Beriah Magoffin	Governor of Kentucky; 1862–1863	Succeeded by Thomas E. Bramlette
