= The Oxford (Waltham, Massachusetts) =

- U.S. National Register of Historic Places
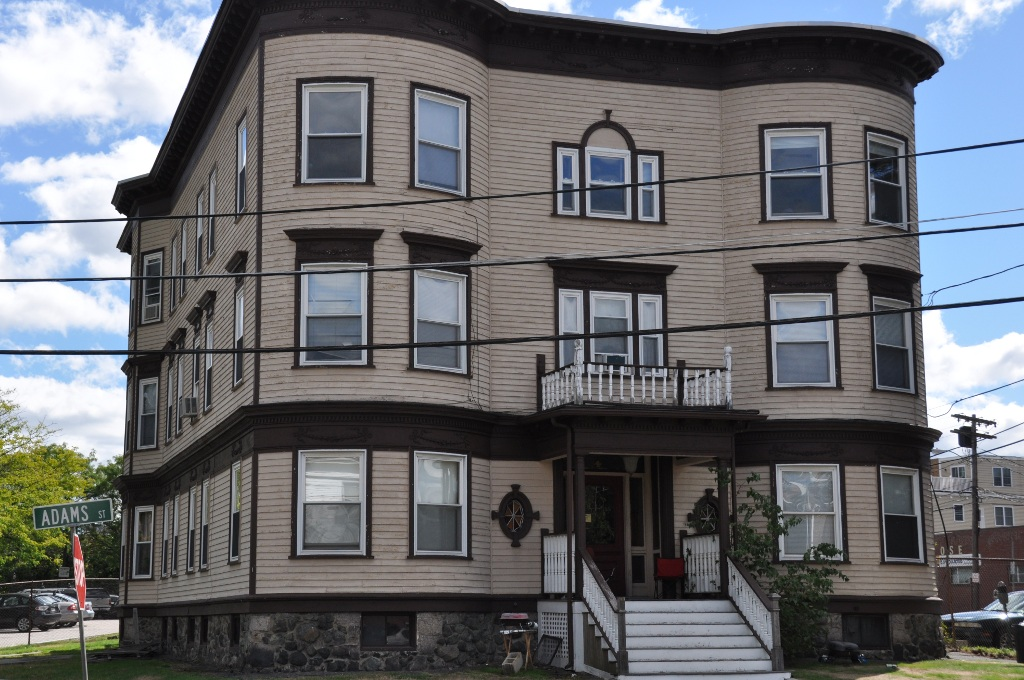

- Location within Massachusetts Location within the United States
- Location: 4 Adams St., Waltham, Massachusetts
- Coordinates: 42°22′16″N 71°14′21″W
- Built: 1897
- Architectural style: Colonial Revival
- MPS: Waltham MRA
- NRHP reference No.: 89001483
- Added to NRHP: September 28, 1989

The Oxford is a historic multiunit residential building in Waltham, Massachusetts. The double triple decker apartment house was built in 1897, during the last major phase of development on the city's South Side, and is one of its only surviving houses of that type. It has well-preserved Colonial Revival features, including a dentillated and modillioned cornice. Its front entry is flanked by a pair of bowed window projections, and is sheltered by a portico supported by Tuscan columns.

The building was listed on the National Register of Historic Places in 1989.

== See also ==
- National Register of Historic Places listings in Waltham, Massachusetts
