= Yuko-En on the Elkhorn =

Garden in Georgetown, Kentucky

Coordinates: 38.2195°N 84.5646°W

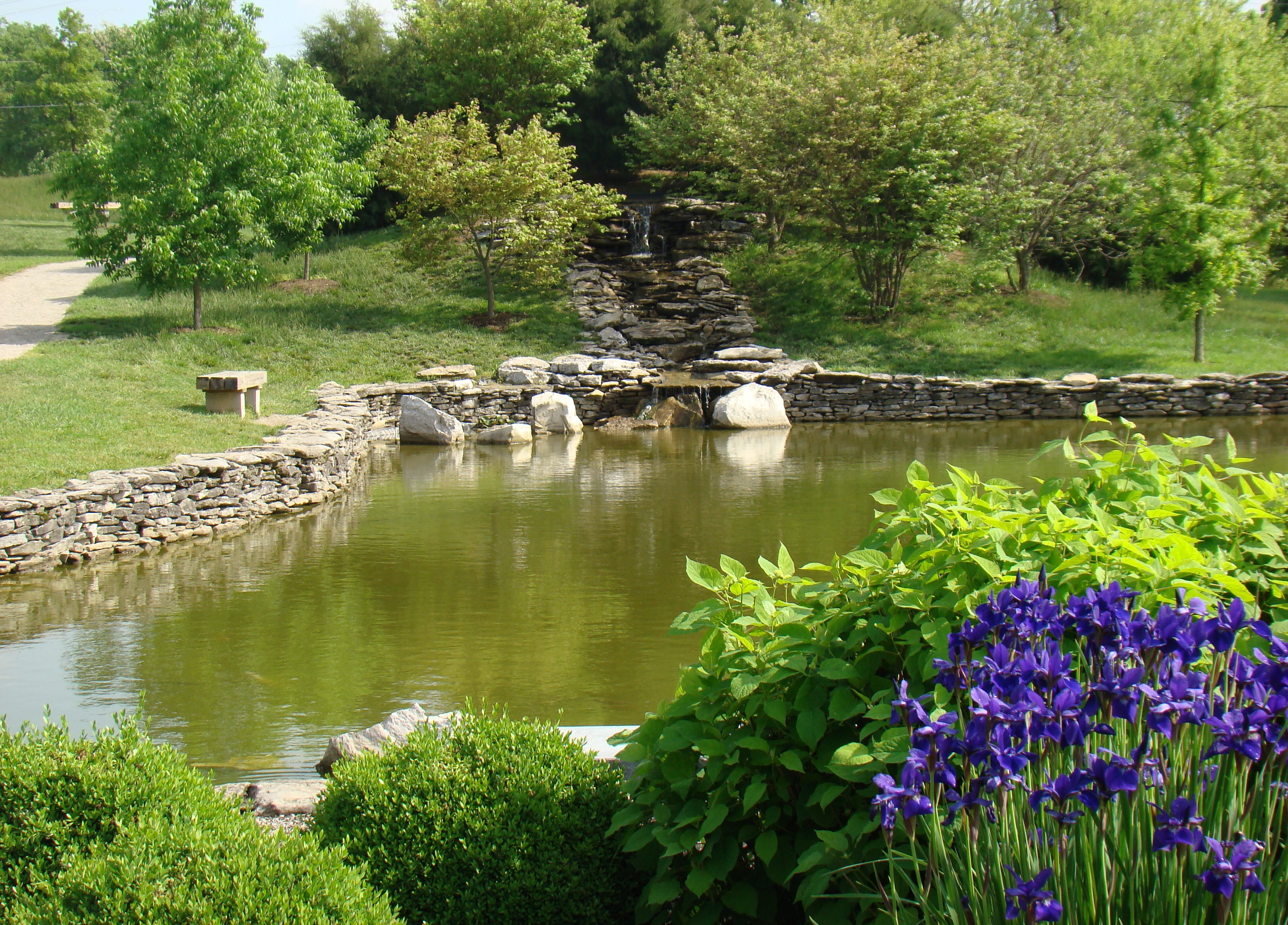
- Interactive map of Yuko-En on the Elkhorn
- Type: Urban park
- Location: Georgetown, Kentucky
- Area: 6 acres (0.024 km^{2})
- Created: 2000
- Operator: Scott Education and Community Foundation
- Visitors: 50,000
- Status: Open all year

Yuko-En on the Elkhorn, the official Kentucky-Japan Friendship Garden, is located in Georgetown, Kentucky on the north fork of Elkhorn Creek. The 6-acre (24,000 m^{2}) garden is designed to have the appearance of a Japanese style strolling garden.

== History ==
The community Japanese Friendship Garden was built in 2000 as a project between the local citizens of Georgetown and the citizens of Georgetown's sister city, Tahara in Japan. Local landscape architects Steve Austin and Jeff Singer helped design and build the garden, incorporating the Bluegrass landscape with the features of a Japanese strolling garden. The Kentucky legislature designated Yuko-En on the Elkhorn, the "Official" Kentucky-Japan friendship garden.

== Features ==
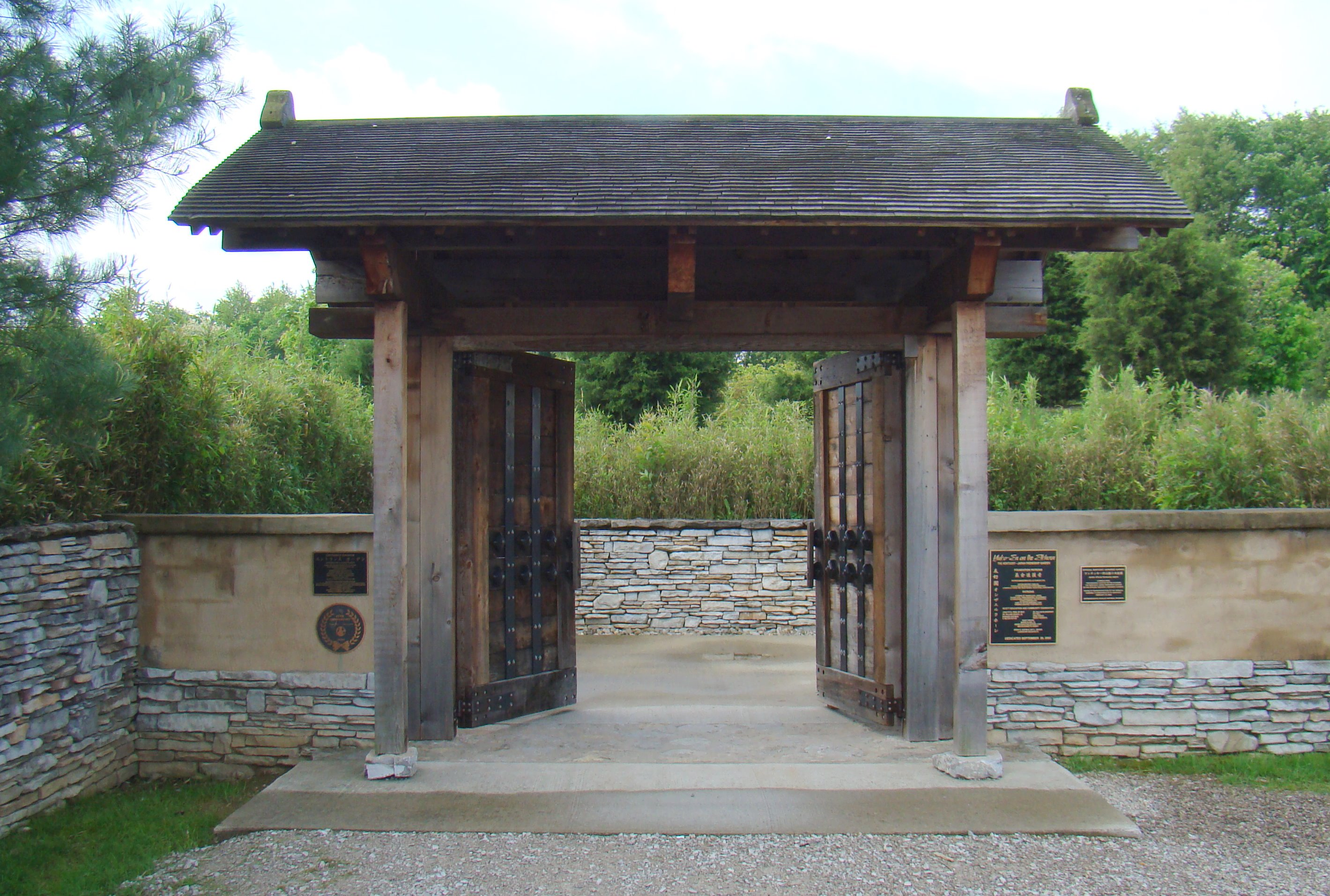
Tokugawa-style entrance gates

The Yuko-En on the Elkhorn garden features the traditional elements of a Japanese garden with plants and landforms native to Japan and Kentucky. The site's flat land was converted with 1400 truckloads of earth into gentle rising hills with gravel paths and arched bridges leading through a water garden, a Zen rock garden, and past the banks of Elkhorn Creek.

The Tokugawa Gates at the entrance to the garden depict the Tokugawa Shogunate era in the form of Medieval European castle gates. A zigzag path leads into the garden through a patch of native cane.

The Tahara Snow Lantern and Maple grove are gifts from the citizens of Tahara. The Maple grove includes species from America and Japan.

A koi pond is the central feature of the garden. Above the koi pond is the Upper Waterfall and Mountain. This feature depicts limestone waterfalls along Elkhorn creek with the cone shaped mountains representing the island of Yakushima, where streams flow down the mountain. The Kazan Sculpture/Tahara Waterfall Garden area has a sculpture of a young Watanabe Kazan, a Japanese painter, scholar and statesman.

The Elkhorn viewing hut is a log structure that is similar to local log buildings in form, but differs with its triangle cut logs representing the treasury building in Nara. The Zen rock garden, best seen from the Elkhorn Viewing Pavilion, has patterns created by local volunteers. The Arched Bridge, painted Japanese red, goes over a dry rock stream that represents streams flow down volcanic peaks in Japan.

== Gallery ==
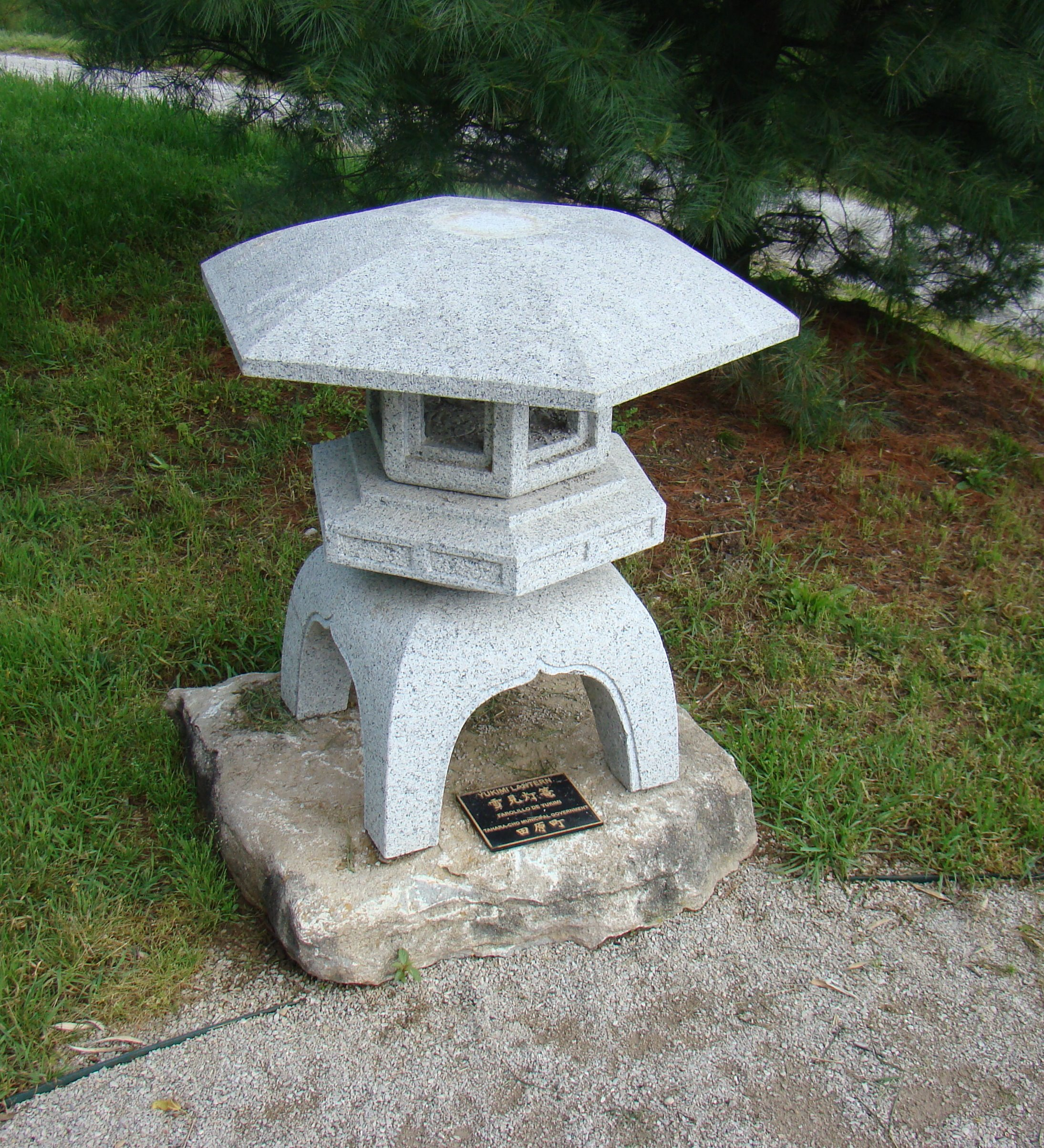
Tahara Snow Lantern.

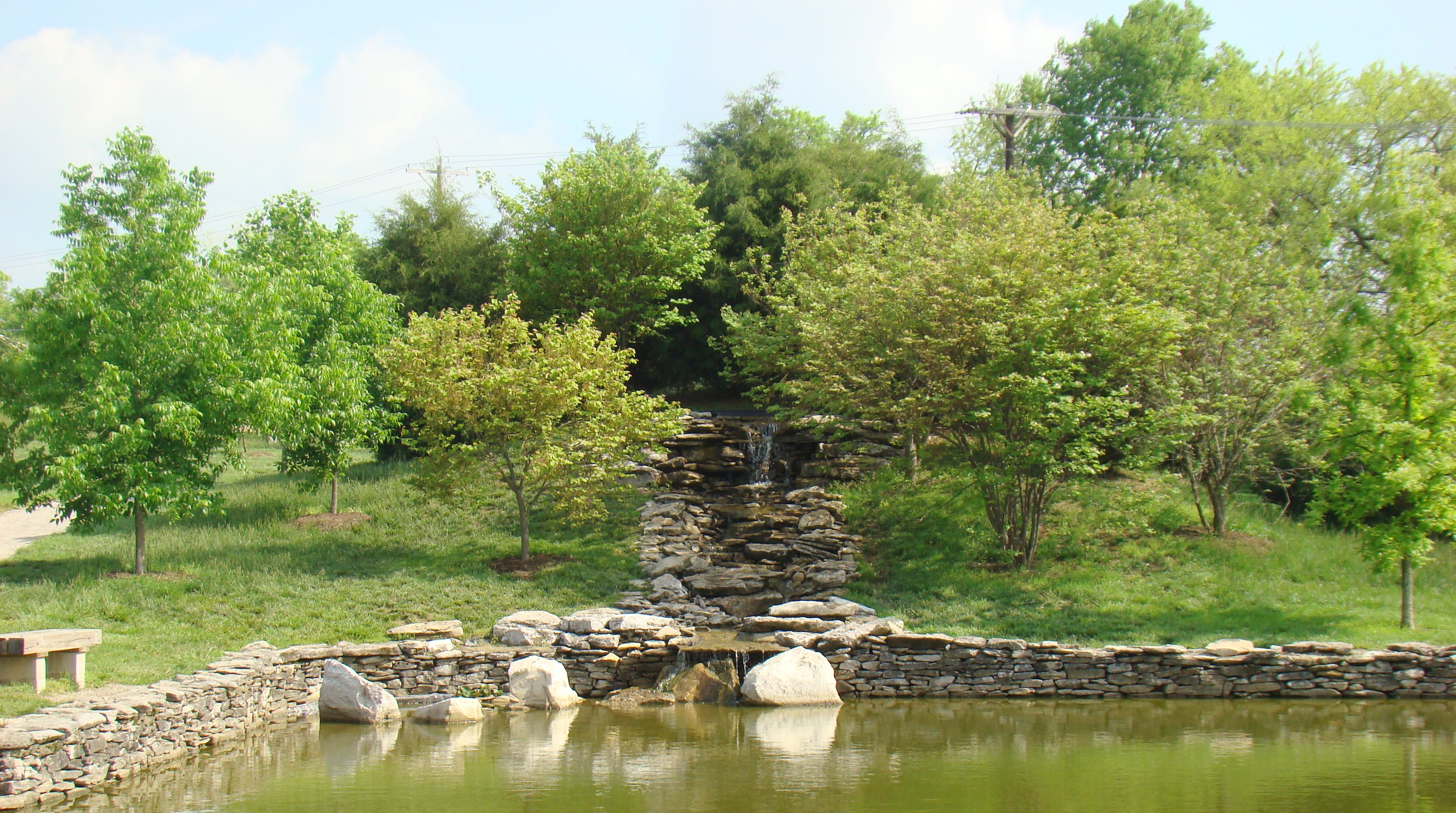
Upper waterfall and Koi pond

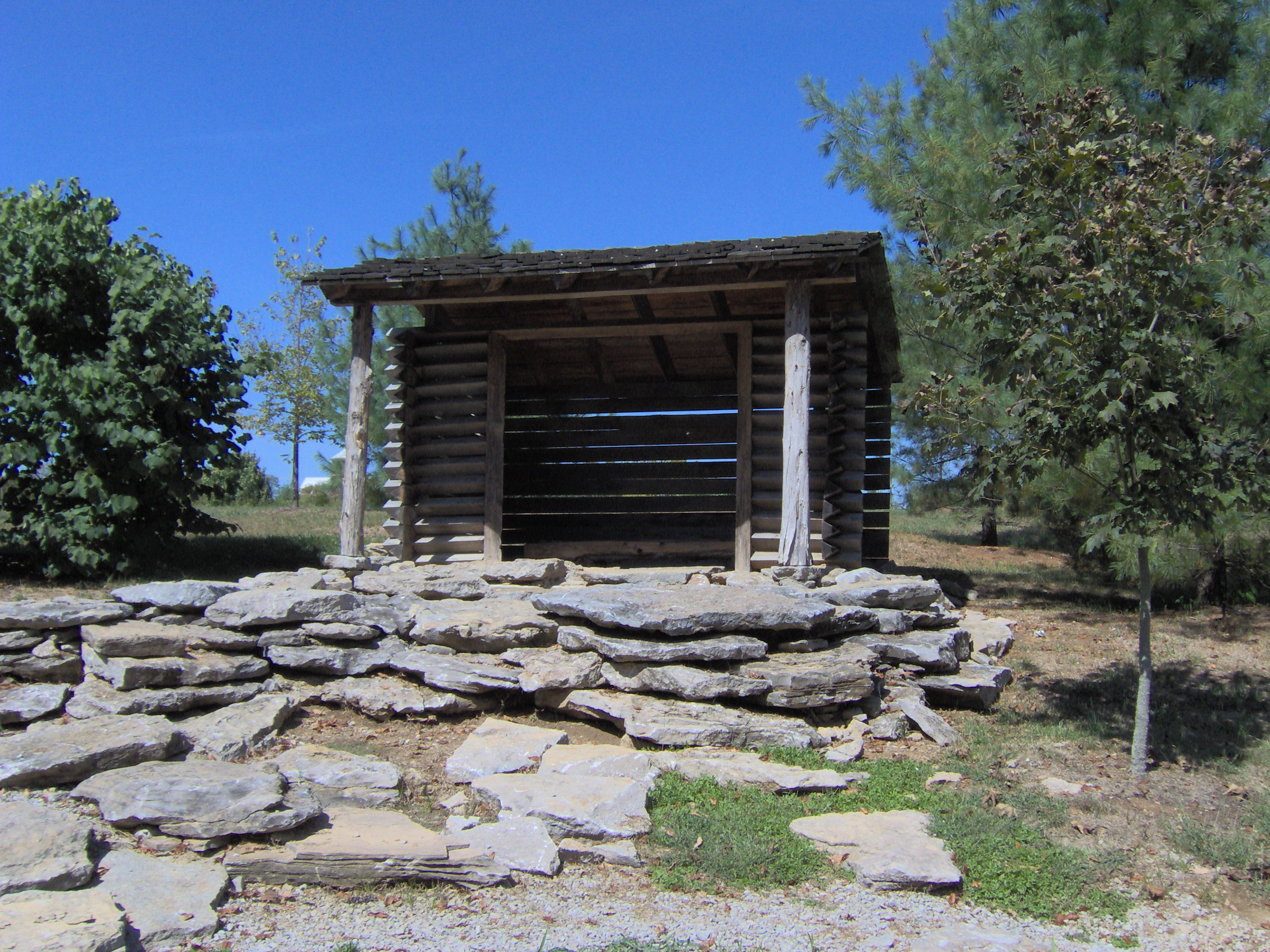
Elkhorn viewing hut

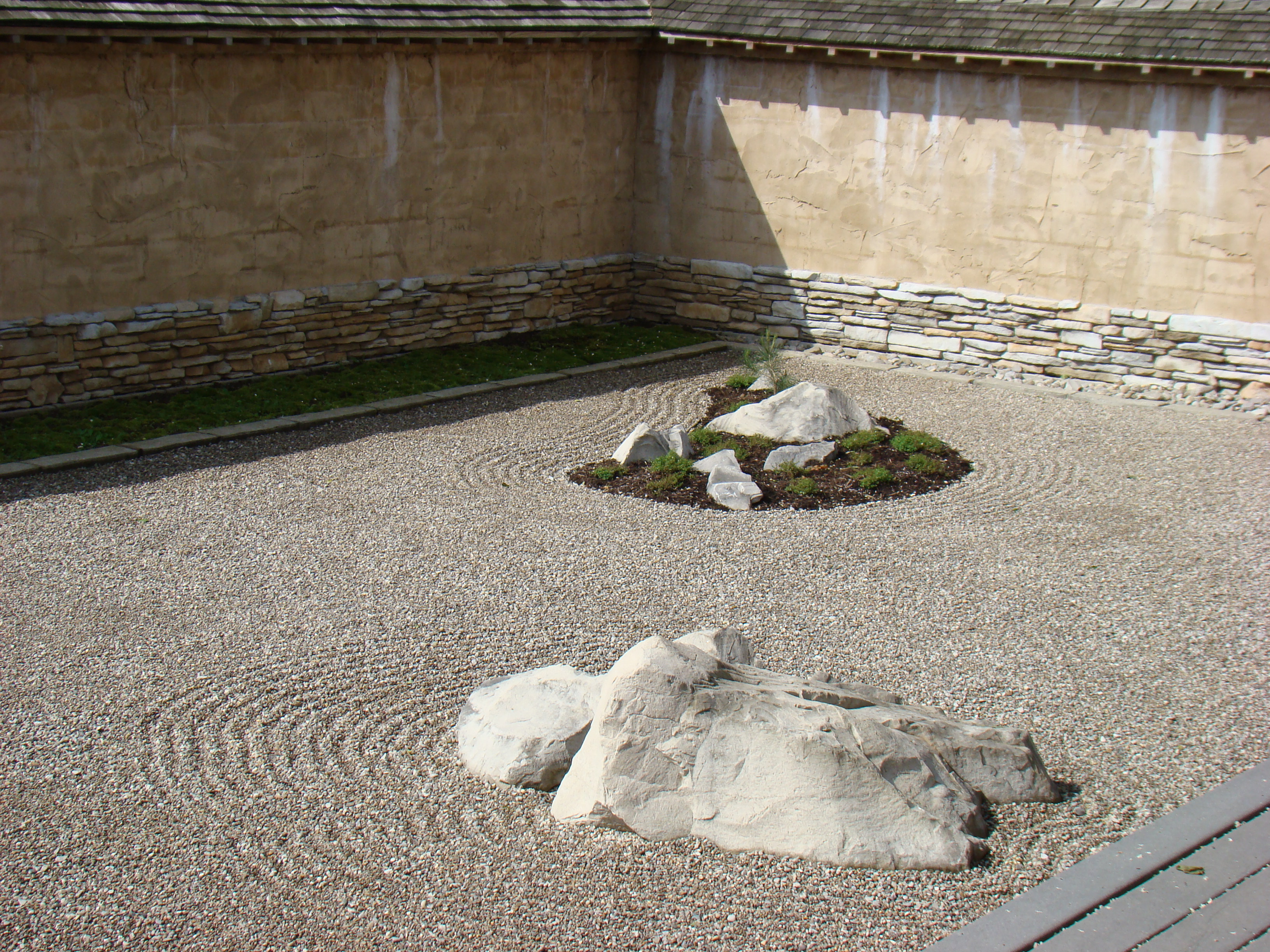
Zen Garden
