= Oxford Historic District (Georgetown, Kentucky) =

Historic district in Kentucky, United States

- U.S. National Register of Historic Places
- U.S. Historic district
- Location within Kentucky Location within the United States
- Nearest city: Georgetown, Kentucky
- Coordinates: 38°16′8″N 84°30′4″W
- Area: 32 acres (13 ha)
- Architect: Multiple
- Architectural style: Greek Revival, Late Victorian
- NRHP reference No.: 79001031
- Added to NRHP: September 11, 1979

Oxford Historic District in Georgetown, Kentucky is a historic district that was listed on the National Register of Historic Places in 1979. It includes Greek Revival and Late Victorian architecture.

It is the site of a historic crossroads community dating from 1836, when Reuben Anderson built a tavern/residence at the northeast corner of what is now the Georgetown-to-Cynthiana Road and the Newtown Pike. Opposite was the Robert Barkley family's log and frame house. Early other buildings which survived until the NRHP listing were another tavern, the William Gray House, the Charles Hamilton House, and the Ward-Hendricks house.

The 32-acre (13 ha) district contained 36 structures, 31 of which were contributing resources.
