= Oxford–Crown Historic District =

Historic district in Massachusetts, United States

- U.S. National Register of Historic Places
- U.S. Historic district
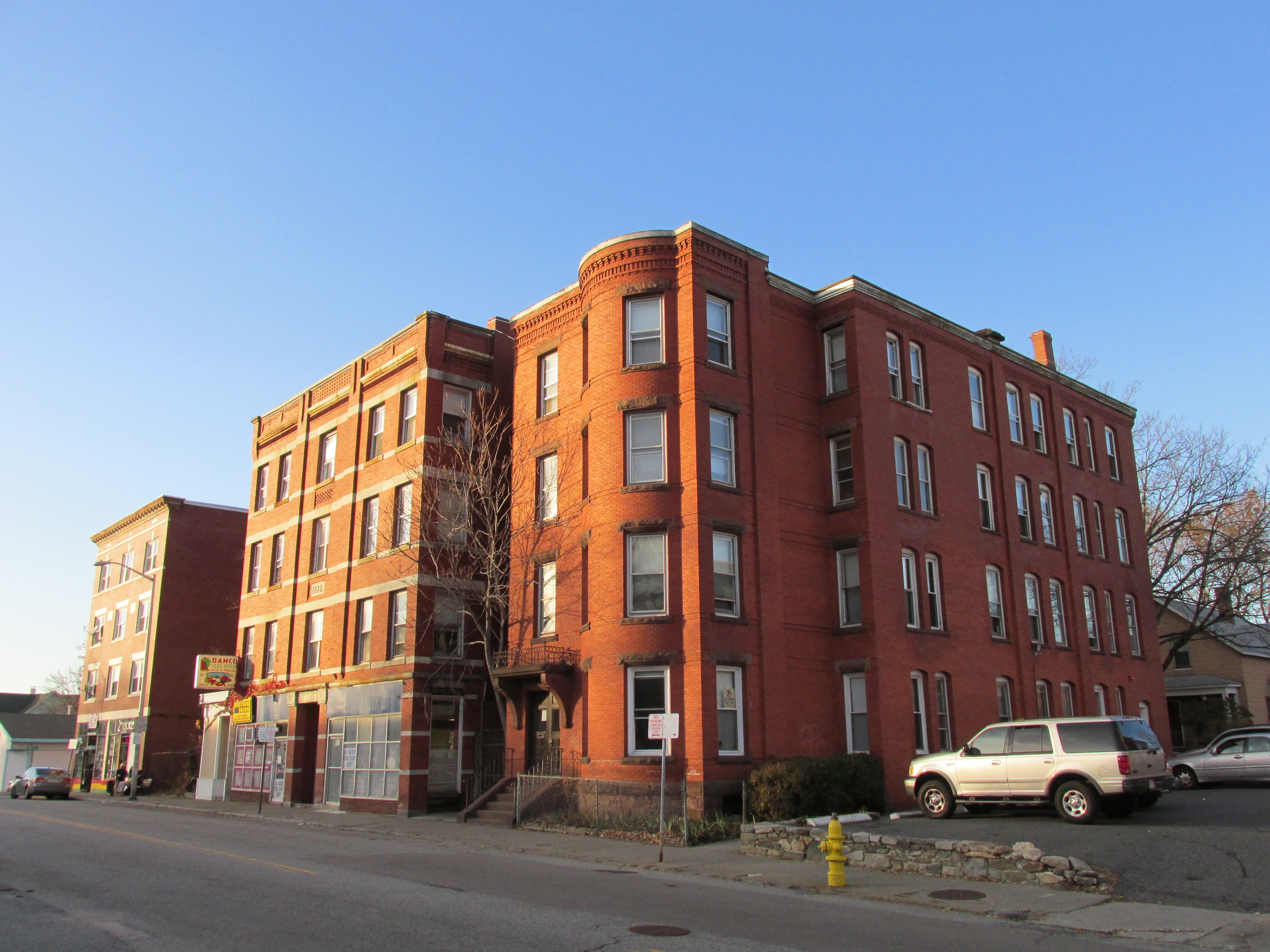
- Pleasant Street at Crown Street

- Location within Massachusetts Location within the United States
- Location: Roughly bounded by Chatham, Congress, Crown, Pleasant, Oxford Sts. and Oxford Pl., Worcester, Massachusetts
- Coordinates: 42°15′54″N 71°48′30″W
- Built: 1836
- Architect: Earle, Stephen C.; Multiple
- Architectural style: Mid 19th Century Revival, Greek Revival, Renaissance
- MPS: Worcester MRA
- NRHP reference No.: 76000954 (original); 80000605 (increase)

Significant dates
- Added to NRHP: May 06, 1976
- Boundary increase: March 05, 1980

Oxford–Crown Historic District is a historic district roughly bounded by Chatham, Congress, Crown, Pleasant, Oxford Streets and Oxford Place in Worcester, Massachusetts.

The district contains Mid 19th Century Revival, Greek Revival, and Renaissance architecture. The area was added to the National Register of Historic Places in 1976, and expanded in 1980.

Due to its proximity to the city's downtown and the assemblage of historically significant properties, the Crown Hill Neighborhood Association gathered to petition City Council to form a Local Historic District in 2008. In October 2010, the Crown Hill Survey Project commenced and in February 2011 the boundaries were created with the help of the neighborhood's property owners. Approval was granted by the Worcester Historical Commission two years after efforts began.

== See also ==
- National Register of Historic Places listings in northwestern Worcester, Massachusetts
- National Register of Historic Places listings in Worcester County, Massachusetts
