= National Register of Historic Places listings in McCracken County, Kentucky =

Location of McCracken County in Kentucky

This is a list of the National Register of Historic Places listings in McCracken County, Kentucky.

This is intended to be a complete list of the properties and districts on the National Register of Historic Places in McCracken County, Kentucky, United States. The locations of National Register properties and districts for which the latitude and longitude coordinates are included below, may be seen in a map.

There are 34 properties and districts listed on the National Register in the county.

This National Park Service list is complete through NPS recent listings posted December 12, 2025.

== Current listings ==
	Name on the Register	Image	Date listed	Location	City or town	Description
1	Artelia Anderson Hall	Artelia Anderson Hall	May 26, 1983 (#83002824)	1400 H.C. Mathis Dr. 37°05′28″N 88°37′59″W	Paducah	Formerly known as the West Kentucky Industrial College from 1909 to 1936, renamed Artelia Anderson Hall from 1936 to 1938. In 1938, it became part of the new West Kentucky Vocational School for Negroes.
2	Anderson-Smith House	Anderson-Smith House	March 1, 1984 (#84001824)	Lone Oak Rd. 37°03′03″N 88°39′10″W	Paducah	Now a welcome center for the state of Kentucky called Whitehaven, it is the only historic house used as any state's welcome center. The building contains the furniture of Vice President Alben Barkley.
3	The Angles	The Angles	July 19, 1976 (#76002147)	Alben W. Barkley Dr. near 40th St. 37°03′35″N 88°38′49″W	Paducah	Home of Vice President Alben W. Barkley
4	Archeological Site 15McN51	Archeological Site 15McN51	July 11, 1985 (#85001513)	Under the Interstate 24 bridge over the Ohio River; 37°07′33″N 88°41′24″W	Paducah vicinity	Also known as the "Reed Site"
5	California Apartments	California Apartments	February 11, 2016 (#16000011)	2900 Clay St. 37°04′39″N 88°38′11″W	Paducah	
6	Confederate Monument in Paducah	Confederate Monument in Paducah	July 17, 1997 (#97000678)	Oak Grove Cemetery, west of the junction of Park Ave. and 13th St. 37°05′10″N 88°37′24″W	Paducah	
7	Grace Episcopal Church	Grace Episcopal Church	March 16, 1976 (#76002148)	820 Broadway; 37°05′03″N 88°36′13″W	Paducah	
8	Home of the Friendless	Home of the Friendless	November 15, 2000 (#00000860)	1335 Burnett St. 37°05′15″N 88°37′02″W	Paducah	
9	Hotel Irvin Cobb	Hotel Irvin Cobb	August 24, 1978 (#78003065)	Broadway and 6th St. 37°05′08″N 88°36′02″W	Paducah	
10	Hotel Metropolitan	Hotel Metropolitan	April 12, 2002 (#01001251)	724 Oscar Cross Ave. 37°04′46″N 88°35′57″W	Paducah	Jackson St. was renamed to Oscar Cross Ave. in 2004
11	Jefferson Street-Fountain Avenue Residential District	Jefferson Street-Fountain Avenue Residential District	July 14, 1982 (#82002735)	Jefferson and Madison Sts., Broadway, Fountain Ave., and Harahan Boulevard; also generally bounded by Park, Madison, and Fountain Aves., and Harahan Boulevard; 37°05′00″N 88°37′00″W	Paducah	Second set of boundaries represents a boundary increase of August 6, 2012
12	Kenmil Place	Kenmil Place	February 11, 2009 (#09000008)	4300 Alben Barkley Dr. 37°03′30″N 88°38′58″W	Paducah	
13	Lincoln School	Lincoln School	June 23, 1988 (#88000895)	S. 8th St., between Ohio and Tennessee Sts. 37°04′40″N 88°35′57″W	Paducah	
14	Lower Town Neighborhood District	Lower Town Neighborhood District	March 15, 1982 (#82002736)	Roughly bounded by Park Ave. and Jefferson, 5th, and 9th Sts. 37°05′17″N 88°36′17″W	Paducah	
15	Market House	Market House	June 19, 1973 (#73002255)	S. 2nd St. between Broadway and Kentucky Ave. 37°05′14″N 88°35′43″W	Paducah	
16	Masonic Temple	Masonic Temple	December 4, 2002 (#02001470)	501-505 S. 7th St. 37°04′50″N 88°35′57″W	Paducah	
17	Nashville, Chattanooga, and St. Louis Railway Office and Freight House	Nashville, Chattanooga, and St. Louis Railway Office and Freight House	July 17, 1979 (#79003118)	300 S. 3rd St. 37°05′06″N 88°35′42″W	Paducah	
18	Paducah City Hall	Paducah City Hall	July 13, 2017 (#100000742)	300 S. 5th St. 37°05′01″N 88°35′50″W	Paducah	
19	Paducah Coca-Cola Bottling Plant	Paducah Coca-Cola Bottling Plant	July 30, 2013 (#13000564)	3121 Broadway; 37°04′16″N 88°38′16″W	Paducah	
20	Paducah Downtown Commercial District	Paducah Downtown Commercial District	April 20, 1982 (#82002737)	Roughly bounded by 7th, 1st, Clark, and Monroe Sts.; also roughly bounded by 1st, Clark, 7th, and Monroe Sts. 37°05′11″N 88°35′56″W	Paducah	Second set of boundaries represents a boundary increase of May 2, 1985
21	Paducah Market House District	Paducah Market House District	April 3, 1978 (#78003066)	2nd St. between Broadway and Kentucky Ave. 37°05′14″N 88°35′44″W	Paducah	
22	Paducah Northside Historic District		October 28, 2022 (#100008325)	Roughly bounded by North 10th St., Park Ave., North 15th, and Northview St. 37°05′20″N 88°36′59″W	Paducah	
23	People's First National Bank and Trust Company Building	People's First National Bank and Trust Company Building	August 11, 1980 (#80001655)	300 Broadway; 37°05′13″N 88°35′49″W	Paducah	
24	Pettit Building	Pettit Building	April 25, 2019 (#100003681)	1135 Park Ave. 37°05′18″N 88°36′47″W	Paducah	
25	Saint Mary Academy Complex	Saint Mary Academy Complex	March 17, 1987 (#87000449)	Bounded by 4th, 5th, Monroe, and Jefferson Sts. 37°05′16″N 88°36′00″W	Paducah	
26	St. Francis DeSales Roman Catholic Church	St. Francis DeSales Roman Catholic Church	April 16, 1979 (#79003119)	116 S. 6th St. 37°05′08″N 88°36′01″W	Paducah	
27	Shawnee Steam Plant	Shawnee Steam Plant	August 4, 2016 (#16000504)	7900 Metropolis Lake Rd. 37°08′29″N 88°45′56″W	West Paducah	
28	Augusta Tilghman High School	Augusta Tilghman High School	April 3, 1995 (#95000300)	401 Walter Jetton Boulevard; 37°04′48″N 88°36′14″W	Paducah	
29	Lloyd Tilghman Memorial	Lloyd Tilghman Memorial	July 17, 1997 (#97000679)	Lange Park, Madison St. between 16th and 19th Sts. 37°04′55″N 88°37′10″W	Paducah	
30	Tilghman-Woolfolk House	Tilghman-Woolfolk House	August 13, 1998 (#98000940)	631 Kentucky Ave. 37°05′04″N 88°36′04″W	Paducah	
31	Union Station School	Union Station School	August 19, 2011 (#11000539)	3138 Flagman Dr. 37°02′21″N 88°36′20″W	Paducah	School for black children until integration in 1966
32	Wallace Park Neighborhood Historic District	Wallace Park Neighborhood Historic District	February 22, 2012 (#12000047)	Roughly bounded by Buckner Ln., Maple Ave., Forest Circle, and Lone Oak Rd. 37°04′00″N 88°38′30″W	Paducah	
33	Westminster Presbyterian Church	Westminster Presbyterian Church	August 2, 2017 (#100001426)	2732 Broadway; 37°04′23″N 88°37′50″W	Paducah	
34	Mayor David A. Yeiser House	Mayor David A. Yeiser House	March 7, 1973 (#73002130)	533 Madison St. 37°05′21″N 88°36′08″W	Paducah	

== See also ==
- List of National Historic Landmarks in Kentucky
- National Register of Historic Places listings in Kentucky
