= Mayo–Underwood School =

American public school in Frankfort, Kentucky (1882–?)

Location
- corner of Mero and Wilkinson Streets, Frankfort, Franklin County, Kentucky; United States
- Coordinates: 38.202883°N 84.8772°W

Information
- Former names: Clinton Street High School (1882/1884–1928)
- Established: 1929
- Closed: 1964

The Mayo–Underwood School (1929–1964), a successor to the Clinton Street High School (1882/1884–1928), was a segregated public elementary and high school for African American students in Frankfort, Kentucky, United States. There is a historic plaque at the former site of the Mayo–Underwood School.

== History ==
=== Clinton Street High School ===
Clinton Street High School was founded in either 1882 or 1884 as both an elementary school and high school, at what was once 168-170 East Clinton Street. The Clinton Street High School closed in 1928, and many of the students were transferred to the newly opened Mayo–Underwood School, located at the corner of Mero and Wilkinson Streets. Former teachers at Clinton Street High School included Charity A. Boyd, Annie L. Fairs, Margaret E. Gray, Bianca Parker, Sadie M. Kirby, Virginia M. Madison, Katie Smith, Julia M. Spencer, Lettye A. Williams, Martha E. Williams, and Winnie A. Scott.

Central High School in Louisville, was the first African American high school in the state. Neighboring Kentucky cities added their own segregated public schools for African American students soon after, including the Clinton Street High School; the Paris Colored High School in Paris; William Grant High School in Covington; Russell School in Lexington; Lincoln High School in Paducah; and Winchester Freedmen School (or Winchester High School) in Winchester.

=== Mayo–Underwood School ===
The Mayo–Underwood School was also founded as an elementary school and high school. It was named after two people, the first being William H. Mayo the former principal of the Clinton Street High School and founder of the State Normal School for Colored Persons (now Kentucky State University); and the second being Edward Ellsworth Underwood, a local physician, activist, and an organizer of the NAACP chapter in Frankfort. The Tiger Inn Café (active from 1931 to 1963) was located near the school and was a popular hangout for students. Alumni of Mayo–Underwood School included football player, Kermit E. Williams (1930–2006); and Luska Joseph Twyman (1913–1988), Kentucky state's first African American mayor in 1968.

The school was torn down in the 1960s as part of an urban renewal plan. Many African American Frankfort community members were upset with the decision to remove the school, as it was associated with important local history they wished to share with the younger generations.

In 2019, the Mayo-Underwood Building at 500 Mero Street, a state building in Frankfort was named in honor of the former school (and replaced the Capital Plaza Tower).

== See also ==
- History of African Americans in Kentucky
