= Union Station School =

Segregated public school, 1928–1966

- U.S. National Register of Historic Places
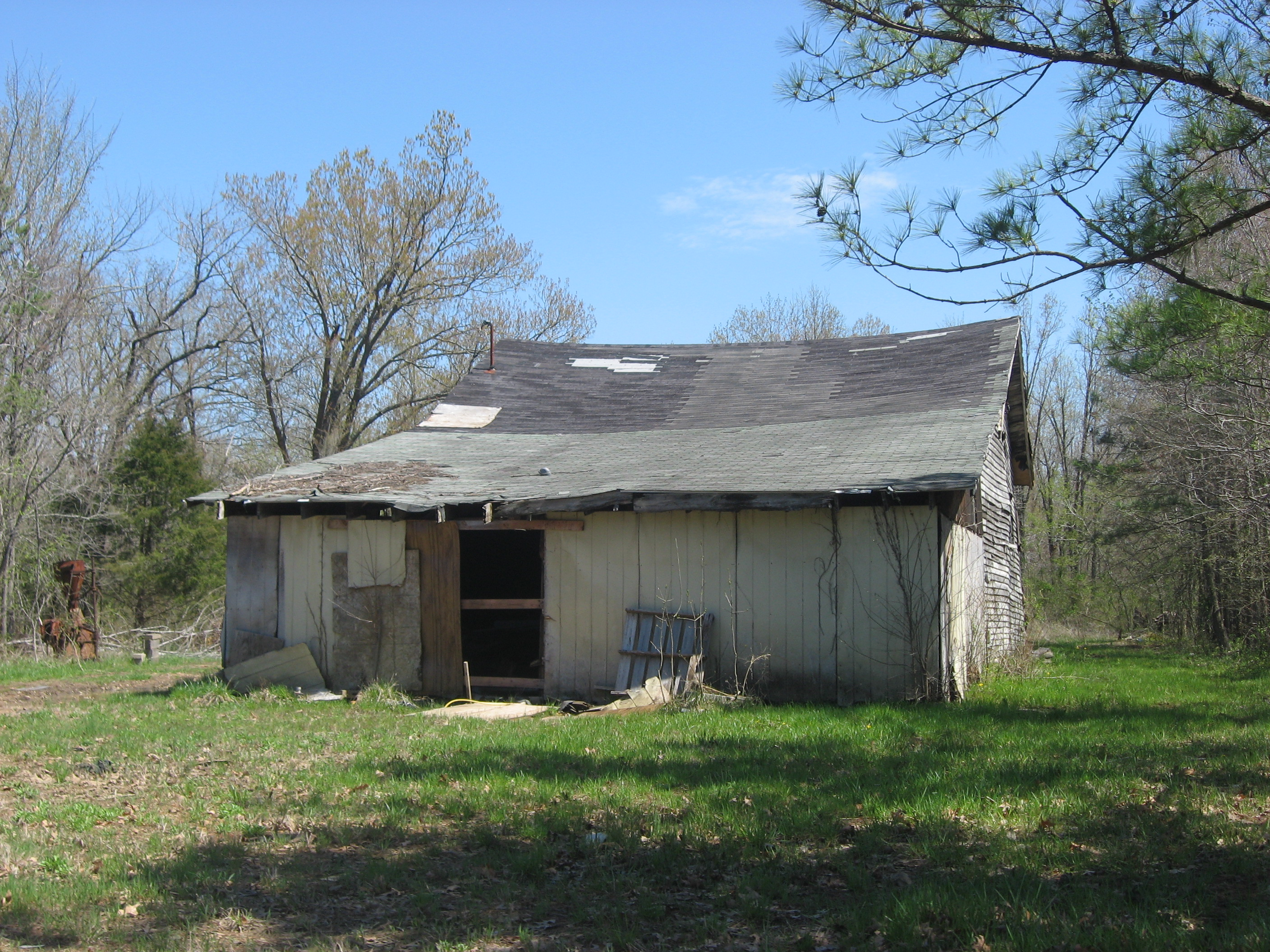
- Location: 3138 Roosevelt Drive (also known as 3138 Flagman Street), Paducah, McCracken County, Kentucky, U.S.
- Coordinates: 37.039167°N 88.605556°W
- Built: c. 1928
- NRHP reference No.: 11000539
- Added to NRHP: August 19, 2011

The Union Station School is a historic building and former segregated public school for African-American students from 1928 until 1966, located in Paducah, Kentucky. It has been listed on the National Register of Historic Places since August 19, 2011 for ethnic heritage.

== History ==
The Union Station School is a one-story wood-frame craftsman style building, built in 1928 and served as a Rosenwald School. From 1928 until 1966, the building was a school house for African American children, grades 1–8. The total cost for the construction of Union Station School was US$4,145 (per Rosenwald files at Fisk University). The Rosenwald Fund contributed US$200; the Black community contributed US$1,200; the White school system contributed US$1,200; and the general fund gave the remaining US$1,545. The building was called a "one teacher school" floor plan and was a single classroom (22’x30) with a chalk board and wood burning stove, a "community room, and two small cloakrooms.

After 1966, the Union Station School students were transferred to the Lone Oak schools (Lone Oak Elementary, and Lone Oak Middle School) in McCracken County during integration, and the building was abandoned. As of 2020, the former school building is still standing but is in disrepair, with roof holes and broken windows.

== African American education in Kentucky ==
Between 1917 and 1920, thirty-three schools were built in the state of Kentucky under the supervision of Rosenwald and Tuskegee Institute, using Rosenwald funding; the following Rosenwald Schools were built in McCracken County: Woodland School (c. 1929), Union Station School (1928), Sanders School (c. 1926), and Grahamville School (c. 1925). Other African-American public schools in the city of Paducah during this time period were Lincoln School at 1715 South Eighth Street; Lincoln Elementary at 8th Street; Rowlandtown School at 1400 Thompson Avenue; Dunbar School at 2510 Yeiser Street; Garfield Elementary at Harris Street; and Sanders Elementary at Levin Avenue.

== See also ==
- National Register of Historic Places listings in McCracken County, Kentucky
- List of African-American historic places
