= Russell School (Lexington, Kentucky) =

Public school active from 1895 to 2003

- U.S. National Register of Historic Places
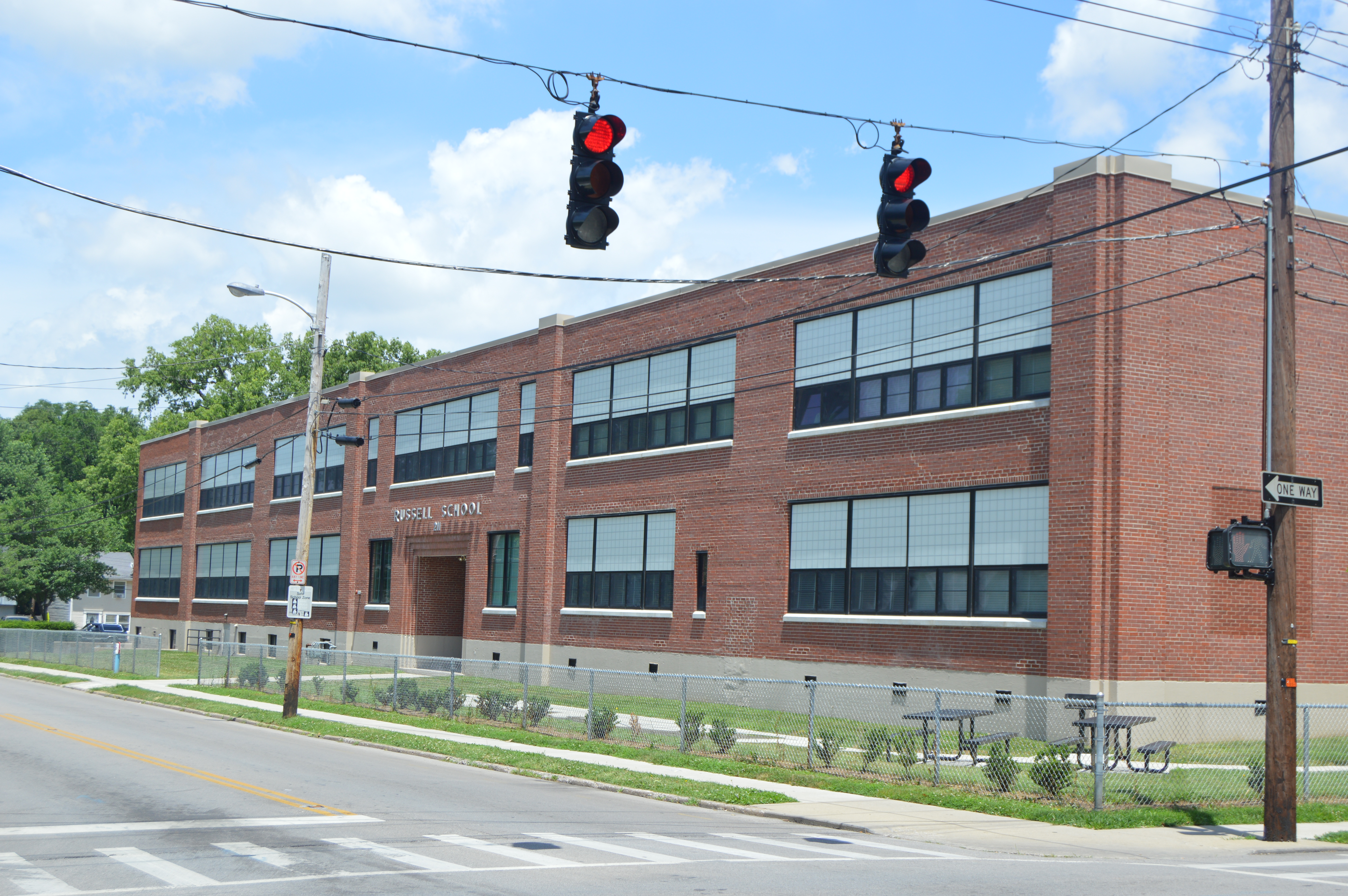
- Location: 201 West Fifth Street, Lexington, Fayette County, Kentucky, U.S.
- Coordinates: 38.053889°N 84.489444°W
- Area: 3.4 acres (1.4 ha)
- Built: 1953
- Architect: John F. Wilson
- Architectural style: International Style
- NRHP reference No.: 06000215
- Added to NRHP: April 5, 2006

The Russell School (1895–2003) is a former public school located in the Northside neighborhood of Lexington, Kentucky. From 1895 until roughly the mid-1960s, the school was segregated and served African American students.

It has been listed on the National Register of Historic Places since April 5, 2006, for its association with African American education in Lexington, Kentucky, between 1953 and 1956.

== Pre-history ==
After the formation of Central High School in Louisville in 1870, neighboring Kentucky cities added their own segregated public schools for African American students including the Russell School in Lexington; Paris Colored High School in Paris; Clinton Street High School (later known as Mayo–Underwood School) in Frankfort; William Grant High School in Covington; Lincoln High School in Paducah; and Winchester High School in Winchester.

The Russell School was initially named Colored School No. 1., founded in 1882 on Fourth Street near the site location of Russell School. By 1888, they erected a new building at the site, an eight-room brick building.

== History ==
In 1895, Colored School No. 1, was renamed the Russell School by the mayor H. C. Duncan of the Lexington; in honor of Green Pinckney Russell, the first licensed African-American teacher in Lexington and the school district superintendent for Black schools. In 1950, the building eventually reached a state of decay and city decided to replace the old school building.

The new building was designed by architect John F. Wilson from Lexington in an International Style, and was completed in 1953 at 201 West Fifth Street. The W. Fifth Street building shared the lot and a field with the Dunbar High School (at North Upper Street). The site was in close proximity to local churches, businesses, and parks and was an anchor to the Northside community. The new school building opened in January 1954, the same year as the U.S. Supreme Court decision for Brown v. Board of Education. By the mid-1960s, the Kentucky Department of Education issued an order for all schools in the state to comply with federal laws and end the process of school segregation through racial integration. However, despite the mandates for integration, the city's schools remained racially identifiable into the early–1970s. In 1972, Judge Mac Swinford ruled that segregation of public schools was in violation of the Equal Protection Clause of the U.S. Constitution, which started the process of students being bussed to other school districts.

In 2003, the school was closed. The school building was remodeled and became the Russell School Apartments, 27 low-income senior housing apartments, and a Head Start/Early Head Start child development center.

== See also ==
- National Register of Historic Places listings in Fayette County, Kentucky
- Douglass School (Lexington, Kentucky)
