= William Warley =

William Warley (January 6, 1884 – April 2, 1946) was an American journalist, newspaper editor, and civil rights activist. He was the chapter president of the NAACP in Louisville, Kentucky. He went to court over the city's segregated housing policy in what became the U.S. Supreme Court case Buchanan v. Warley. Warley had been blocked from buying a home in a "white neighborhood" in 1915. In 1917 the U.S. Supreme Court ruled unanimously that government ordinances segregating housing violated constitutional rights. Warley also protested segregated streetcars.

His mother, Belle, was a dressmaker. He attended Central High School and spoke out about the inferior educational offerings available to African Americans in Louisville. He graduated from Louisville's State University. He worked at the Pendennis Club before he secured a job with the United States Post Office.

The white real estate agent selling the property, Charles H. Buchanan, and Warley the buyer wanted the ordinance overturned. Moorfield Storey argued the housing segregation case before the U.S. Supreme Court.

Warley founded the Louisville News in 1912 and served as its editor. He married and had two daughters.

Louisville's Republican Party refused to back Warley's campaign for a seat in the state legislature. With Democrats openly hostile to African Americans, this and other instances of lack of support led some African Americans to form their own Lincoln Independent Party.

After complications from an operation, Warley died on April 2, 1946.

== See also ==
- History of African Americans in Kentucky
- Racial segregation in the United States
