= Central High School (Louisville, Kentucky) =

Coordinates: 38.25010°N 85.77020°W

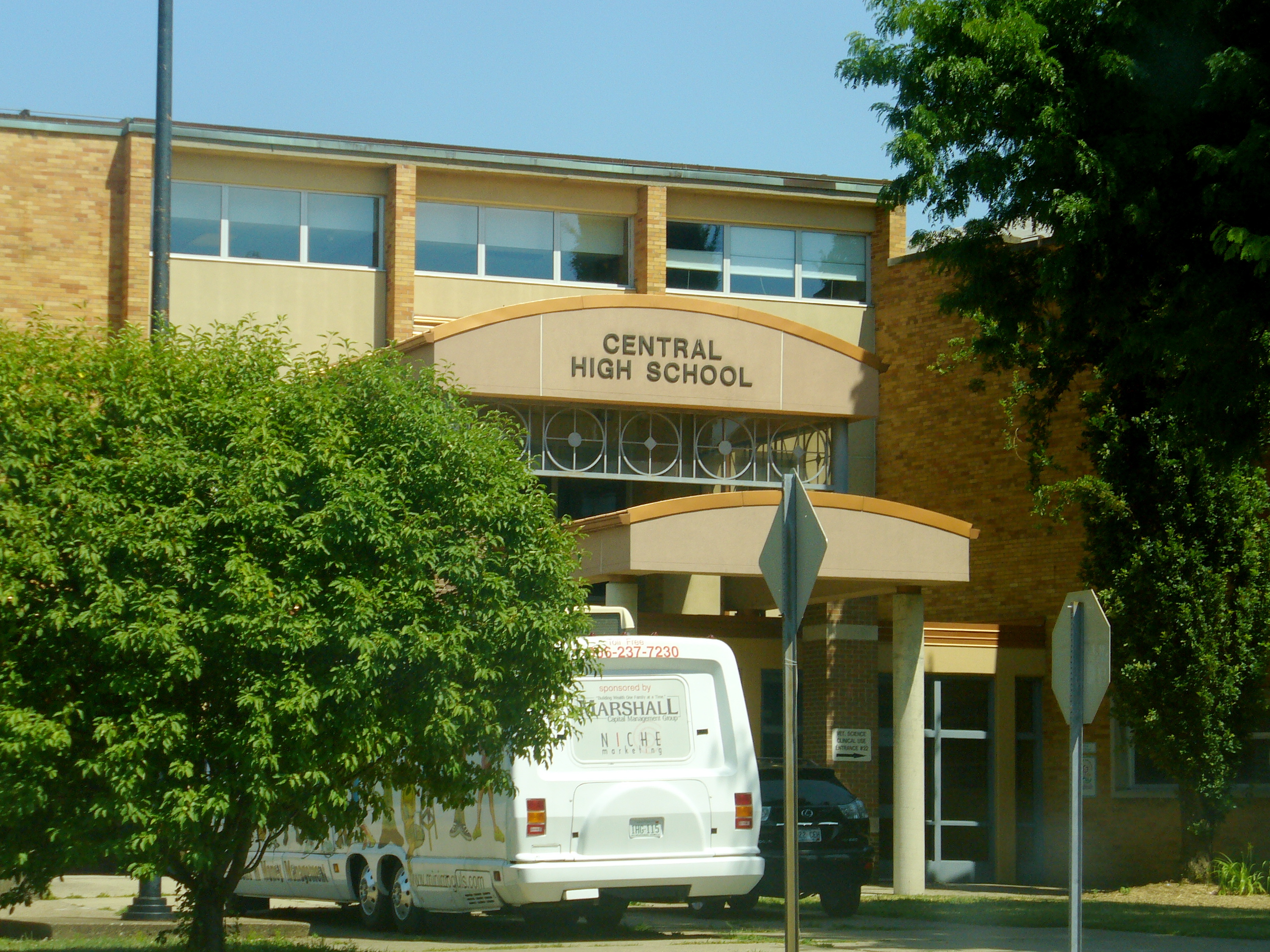

Location
- 1130 West Chestnut Street; Louisville, Kentucky 40202; United States

Information
- Type: Public high school
- Motto: "Simply the Best"
- Established: 1870
- School district: Jefferson County Public Schools
- Principal: Tamela Compton
- Staff: 81.03 (FTE)
- Grades: 9–12
- Enrollment: 1,256 (2024–2025)
- Student to teacher ratio: 15.50
- Campus: Urban
- Colors: Gold █ and Black █
- Team name: Yellow Jacket
- Website: jefferson.kyschools.us/o/centralhs

Central High School, formally known as Central High Magnet Career Academy, is a public high school located in the Russell neighborhood of Louisville, Kentucky, United States. Founded in 1870 as Central Colored School, it was the first African-American high school in the state of Kentucky. It was a segregated school for African American students from 1870 until 1956. It was formerly known as Central Colored High School.

== 19th and 20th-century history ==
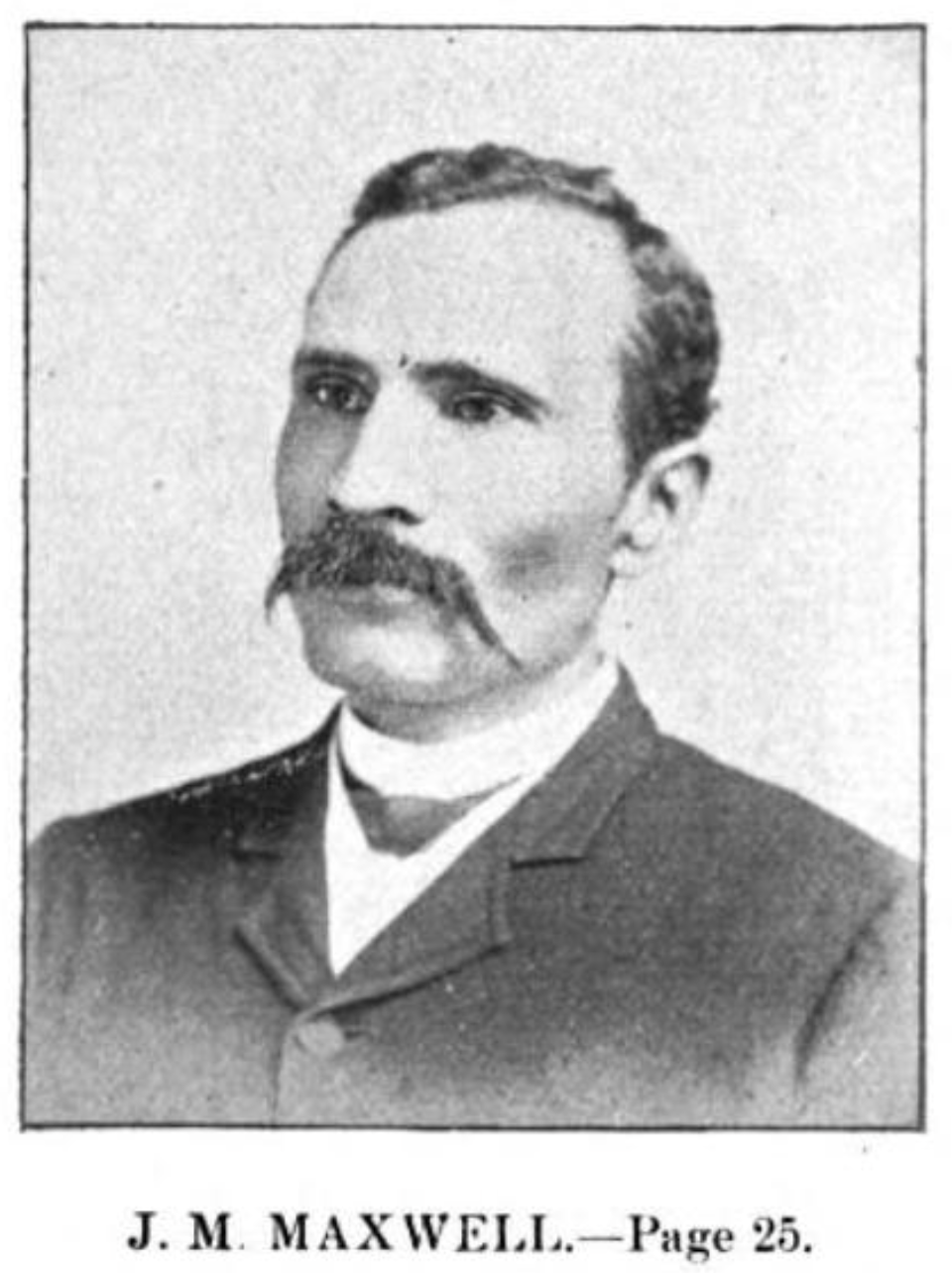
John Miller Maxwell (c. 1897), first principal of Central High School

Central Colored School opened on October 7, 1873, and was located at Sixth and Kentucky. It became the first African-American high school in the state of Kentucky when high school classes were added. The first class of students enrolled was 87 pupils and they received 2 years of high school-level education.

After the formation of Central High School (Louisville Colored High School), neighboring Kentucky cities added their own segregated public schools for African American students including Paris Colored High School in Paris; Clinton Street High School (later known as Mayo–Underwood School) in Frankfort; William Grant High School in Covington; Russell School in Lexington; Lincoln High School in Paducah; and Oliver High School in Winchester.

Central High School would go on to have four other locations: Ninth and Magazine Streets, Ninth and Chestnut Streets, Eighth and Chestnut Streets, and its current location of Eleventh and Chestnut Streets since 1952.

The school was renamed Central Colored High School in 1892 and John Miller Maxwell was its first principal. William Warley, civil rights campaigner, attended Central and while a student in 1902 prepared a speech about the inferior educational offerings available to African Americans in Louisville.

In 1917, a former school for whites was remodeled for it.

Until 1956, Louisville Central High School was the only public high school in the city for African Americans. The United States Supreme Court struck down racial segregation in public schools in 1954 in the famous Brown v. Board of Education, Topeka, Kansas case. In 1956, Louisville public schools desegregated.

Louisville Central High School and the rest of the Louisville school system played a part in both integration efforts and the Cold War. In 1957, as many around the world began to take notice of racial problems within the United States, the United States Information Agency produced promotional materials touting "The Louisville Story" as an example of peaceful integration.

In 1978, a committee of the Jefferson County Public Schools considered renaming Central High School in honor of its most famous alumnus Muhammad Ali, but the motion failed to pass.

== Programs and curriculum ==
Specializing in preparing students for professional careers, Central High School offers many magnet programs. As an all-magnet school, it has no home district, instead it brings in students from throughout the Jefferson County Public School System. Magnet programs offered include:

- Street law
- Law and government
- Writing Skills and Mentorship Program
- Marshall-Brennan Civil Liberties
- University of Louisville College Credit
- Pre-Medical
- Pharmacy
- Pre-Nursing
- Veterinary
- Dentistry
- Management
- Montessori
- Sports Marketing
- Computer Science
- Robotics
- Microsoft ID Academy

The Law and Government magnet is the only program like it in the JCPS school system, directed by Joe Gutmann. The Law and Government magnet has a signature partnership with the University of Louisville and Louisville Bar Association.

Louisville Central High School offers Kentucky's first public high school Montessori program in 2017. Dr. Montessori's vision for cosmic education, micro-economics, grace, and peace, is paired with Central's successful career themed magnet program.

Central High School principal is Tamela Compton.

== Athletics ==
Central High School's band features the "C PHI" drumline, performing alongside the "Honeybees", "The Twirlettes" and the "Stingettes" majorette dance team. It is the first in the county to incorporate majorettes into the band.

In the 1950s, Central High School won three national basketball high school championships.

In 1983, Central High School won the WAVE-TV's High Q Championship. In 2007, when Central won the 3A State Football Championship, Head Coach Ty Scroggins became the first African-American high school coach in Kentucky history to win a state football championship. On December 12, 2008, Central's football team repeated the feat of winning the 3A State Championship, becoming the first Louisville public high school to do so in 44 years.

Louisville Central's 2007, 2008, 2010, 2011, 2012 and 2018 football team become 3A champions and their basketball team won 2008's regional basketball championship.

In 2009, the Central High School basketball team (which started 0–8) repeated as regional basketball champions and advanced to the sweet sixteen championship game against Holmes High School. Central also swept the boys' and girls' 2-A Track & Field Regional Championship titles.

In 2010 Central made history by beating the Belfry Pirates to win the 3A Conference Championship. This is their 3rd championship in four seasons.

In 2011 Central again made history by beating Phillip Haywood's' Belfry Pirates in the KHSAA 3A State Championship. This was their 4th Championship in five seasons.

In December 2012 for the 3rd consecutive year Central High School claimed the KHSAA 3A State Championship. They defeated the Belfry Pirates with a score of 12–6. This was their 5th championship in 6 seasons.

On November 30, 2018, the Yellow Jackets won another KHSAA 3A State Championship, their first under coach Marvin Dantzler.

== Racial preference controversy ==
Until 2000, all high schools in Jefferson County were required to maintain a percentage of African-American students between 15 and 50%. In 2000, a group of black parents sued after their children were denied admission to Central High School. As a result, in 2007 U.S. District Judge John Heyburn II struck down the use of race-conscious school assignment procedures for Jefferson County magnet and traditional schools such as Central.

== Notable people ==
=== Notable alumni ===
- Cassius Clay (Muhammad Ali; 1942–2016), class of 1960, three-time World Heavyweight Champion and boxing Hall of Famer
- Elmer Lucille Allen (born 1931), class of 1949, ceramic artist and first African-American chemist
- Bill Beason (1908–1988), swing jazz drummer
- Yvonne Young Clark (1929–2019), first woman to graduate from Howard University with a Bachelor of Science degree in Mechanical Engineering
- Keelan Cole (born 1993), NFL wide receiver with the Las Vegas Raiders
- Jimmy Ellis (1940–2014), former WBA Heavyweight champion
- Sam Gilliam (1922–2022), painter, contemporary visual artist
- Helen Humes (1913–1981), blues, R&B and classic popular singer
- Alberta Odell Jones (1930–1965), class of 1948, Kentucky's first practicing African-American woman attorney; victim of unsolved 1965 murder
- Jonah Jones (1909–2000), jazz trumpeter
- Lenny Lyles (1936–2011), color-barrier-breaking football star at the University of Louisville; 11-season player in the NFL
- Bob Miller (born 1956), NBA basketball player for the San Antonio Spurs
- Darryl Owens (1937–2022), Kentucky State Representative
- Greg Page (1958–2009), former WBA Heavyweight champion
- Corey Peters (born 1988), NFL player with the Jacksonville Jaguars
- William H. Perry Sr. (1860–1946), class of 1877, educator, principal and physician
- Maurice Rabb Jr. (1932–2005), ophthalmologist
- D'Angelo Russell, NBA player with the Los Angeles Lakers attended only his freshman year
- Ed Smallwood (1937–2002), basketball player
- C. J. Spillman (born 1986), former NFL player
- Bob Thompson (1937–1966), painter
- Dicky Wells (1907–1985), jazz trombonist

=== Notable faculty ===
- Lyman T. Johnson (1906–1997), former faculty, plaintiff in Federal Court case that desegregated the University of Kentucky in 1949

== See also ==
- List of public schools in Louisville, Kentucky
- List of African-American historic places
- National Register of Historic Places listings in Jefferson County, Kentucky
- Jeffersontown Colored School
