= Delaware and Hudson Railroad Freight House (Cohoes, New York) =

- U.S. National Register of Historic Places
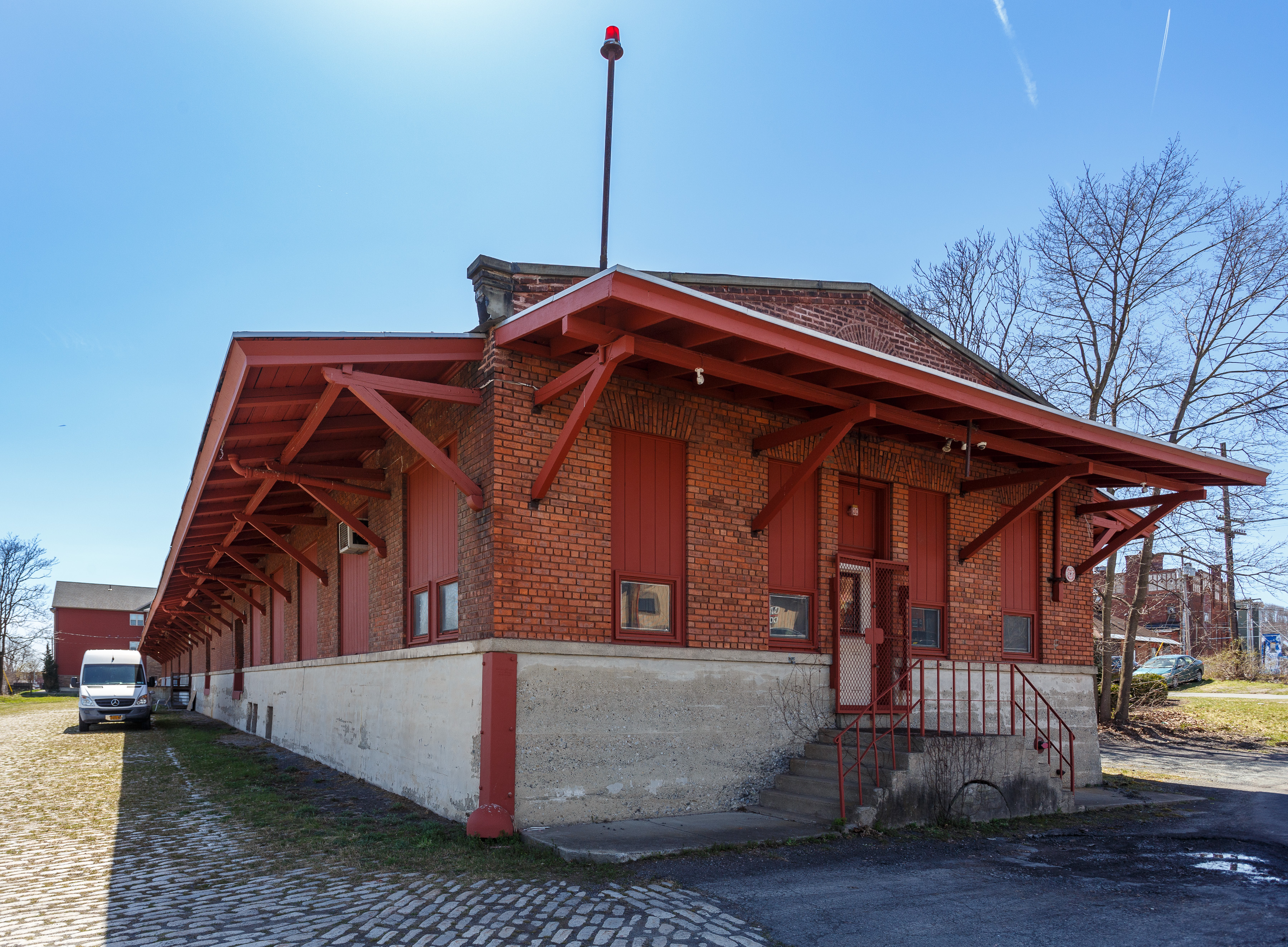

- Location within New York Location within the United States
- Location: 116 Saratoga Avenue, Cohoes, New York
- Coordinates: 42°46′20″N 73°41′56″W
- Area: less than one acre
- Built: 1910
- NRHP reference No.: 98000135
- Added to NRHP: February 20, 1998

The Delaware and Hudson Railroad Freight House is a historic railroad building located at Cohoes, Albany County, New York. The freight house was built in 1910 by the Delaware and Hudson Railway. It is a one-story, rectangular brick building on a raised, battered concrete basement. It measures approximately 40 feet (12 m) wide and 300 feet (91 m) long, and has a low pitched gable roof.

It was added to the National Register of Historic Places on February 20, 1998.

== See also ==
- National Register of Historic Places listings in Albany County, New York
