= Paducah Freight House =

- Nashville, Chattanooga, and St. Louis Railway Office and Freight House
- U.S. National Register of Historic Places
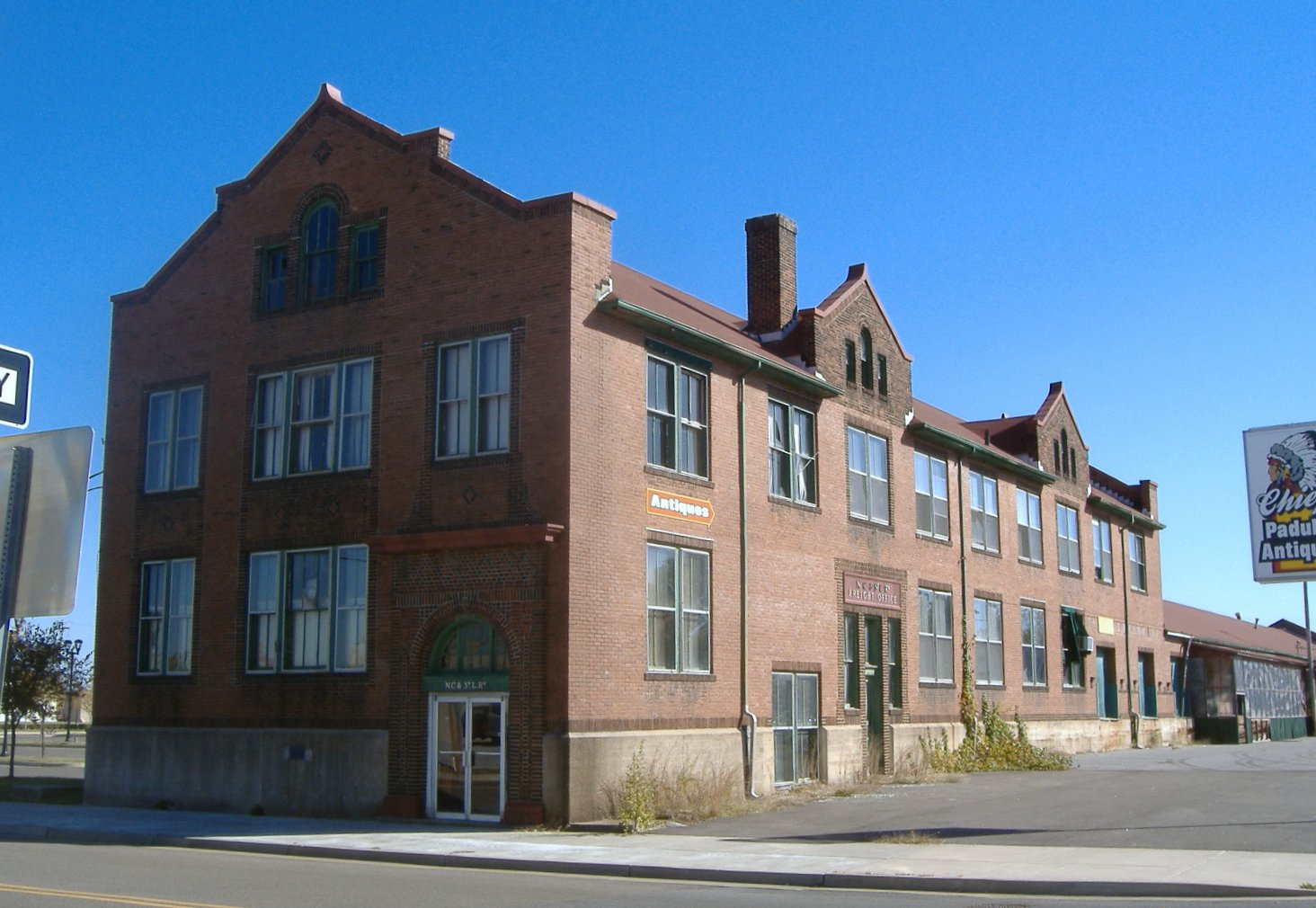

- Location within Kentucky Location within the United States
- Location: 300 S. 3rd St., Paducah, Kentucky
- Coordinates: 37°5′6″N 88°35′42″W
- Built: 1925
- NRHP reference No.: 79003118
- Added to NRHP: July 17, 1979

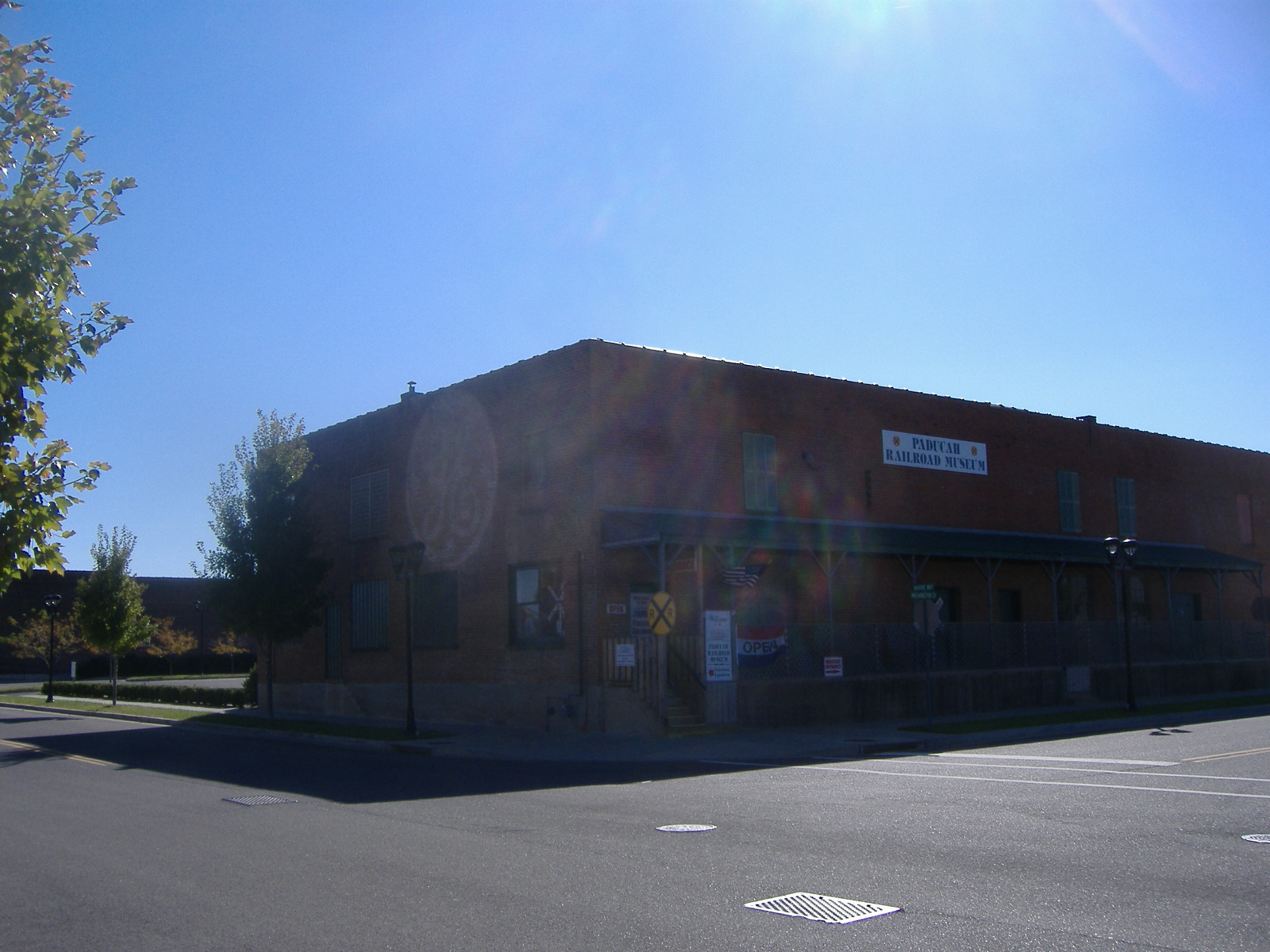
Paducah Railroad Museum

The Nashville, Chattanooga, and St. Louis Railway Office and Freight House, simply known as the Paducah Freight House, is a historic railroad freight depot located in the southern portion of downtown Paducah, Kentucky.

In 1852 the first charter to build a railroad for Paducah was established. Lloyd Tilghman, representative of the New Orleans & Ohio Railroad, established the first seven miles of track for Paducah, connecting the town to Florence Station, Kentucky.

The freight house was constructed in 1925 by the Nashville, Chattanooga and St. Louis Railway in hopes of future connections with other railroads, such as the Big Four Railroad. As such, it was built larger than it needed to be, as those connections were never built. The station was usually used to transport fruits and vegetables that required refrigeration from trains to the private transportation of produce dealers. The Railway was absorbed into the Louisville & Nashville Railroad in 1957. In 1974 the L&N reduced their presence in Paducah and moved their workers to a different depot at 6th and Norton in Paducah. The Johnston-Backus Brokerage Company purchased the building in November 1976. In 1993 Johnston and Backus retired, selling it to Charles and Carolyn Simpson, who made it an antique mall.

The Freight House is a two-story brick structure with a limestone foundation. It has a Tudor look with its Palladian-type windows and parapeted dormers and end walls. Its different colored bricks detail the openings of the building.

The Paducah Railroad Museum is next door. It started on the second floor of the freight house, but once the freight house was sold the museum moved to Washington and 2nd streets.

Preceding station	Louisville and Nashville Railroad	Following station
Terminus	Paducah - Bruceton	Benton toward Bruceton
