= Capital Plaza Office Tower (Frankfort, Kentucky) =

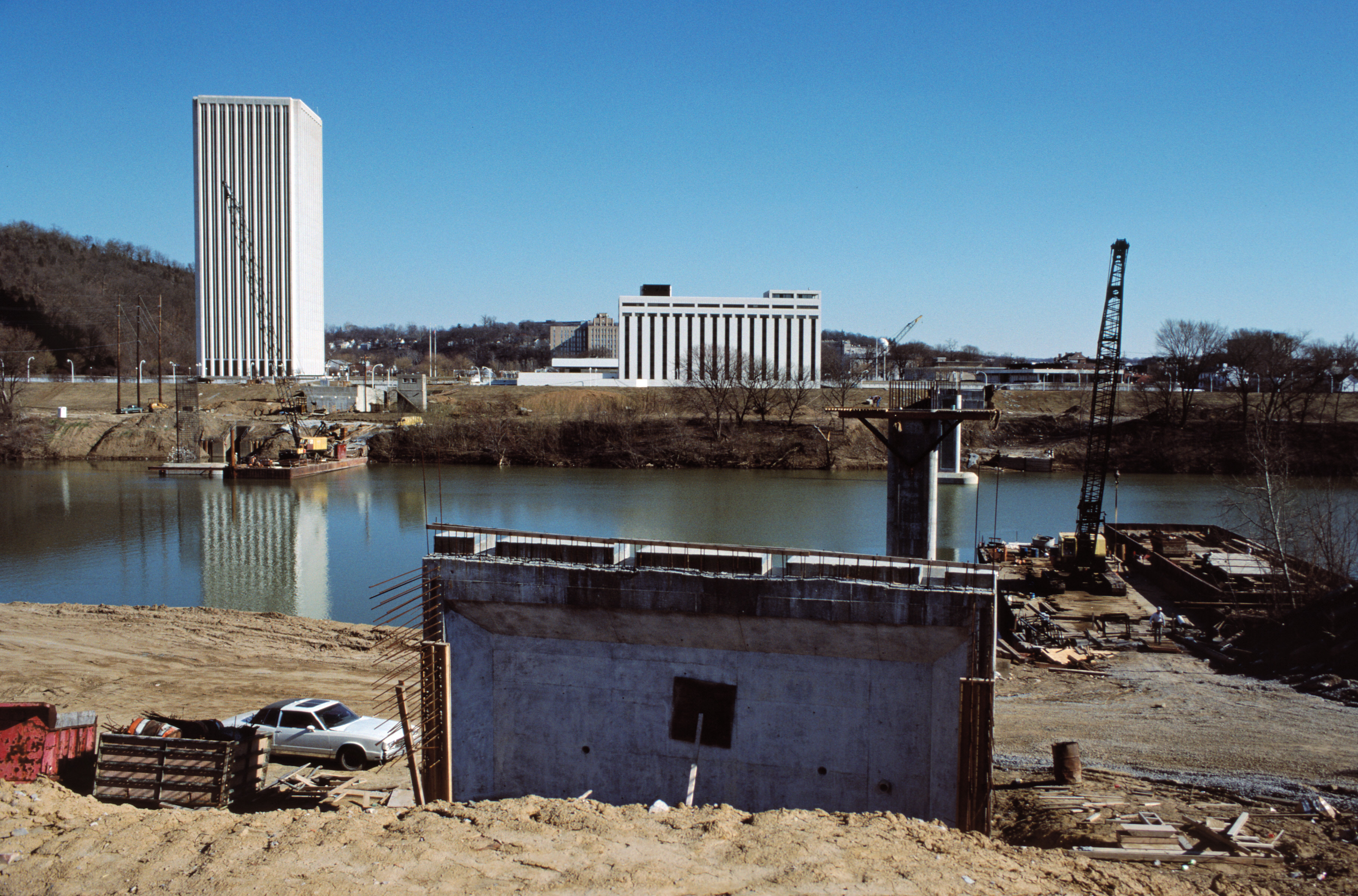
- West Frankfort Connector Bridges under construction in 1988 (Capital Plaza Office Tower in the background to the left).
- Interactive map of the Capital Plaza Office Tower area

General information
- Type: Governmental Office
- Architectural style: Modernist
- Location: 500 Mero Street, Frankfort, Kentucky, United States
- Coordinates: 38°12′12″N 84°52′37″W
- Construction started: 1968
- Completed: 1972
- Opened: 1972
- Closed: 2016
- Demolished: March 11, 2018
- Owner: Commonwealth of Kentucky

Height
- Roof: 338 feet (103 m)

Technical details
- Floor count: 28

Design and construction
- Architect: Edward Durell Stone
- Architecture firm: Edward Durell Stone & Associates, Lee Potter Smith, Pritchett, Hugg & Carter
- Structural engineer: Praeger-Kavanaugh-Waterbury
- Main contractor: Robert E. McKee General Contractor, Inc.

The Capital Plaza Office Tower was a 338-foot tall, 28-story office skyscraper located at 500 Mero Street in Frankfort, Kentucky. It was the tallest building in Frankfort and the 11th tallest building in the state of Kentucky.

== History ==
Construction for the tower started in 1968 and completed in 1972 as part of the Capital Plaza Project, which also included the Frankfort Convention Center and Fountain Place Shoppes. The building was designed by architect Edward Durrell Stone, who was also the architect for the Aon Center (then known as the Standard Oil Building) in Chicago, Illinois, and the General Motors Building in Manhattan, New York City. The Robert E. McKee Co. of Dallas Texas was general contractor.

The building mainly housed state government offices.

By the early 2000s, the Capital Plaza Complex had fallen into disrepair including the Capital Plaza Office Tower, with sections of the plaza being closed to pedestrians due to safety. In August 2008, a Lexington-based architecture firm and city officials recommended the demolition of the Capital Plaza Office Tower and redevelopment of the site after determining it would be more cost efficient to demolish the tower and put a new building in its place.

== Closure and demolition ==
In 2016, the building was abandoned and closed due to the structural condition of the building; the final tenants moved out by October 2016. In July 2016, the building went up for sale. Falling concrete and water leaks from the building were reported in its later years, and after two years of debate as to whether to restore or tear down the building, the decision was ultimately made to demolish the tower.

On March 11, 2018, the Capital Plaza Office Tower was demolished via implosion with 1,500 pounds of explosives by main contractor Renascent, Inc. and subcontractor Controlled Demolition, Inc. to make room for a new 5-story office building, park, and 1,100-space parking garage.

In 2019, the Mayo-Underwood Building, a new state building, opened in the same location, named after the former Mayo–Underwood School.
