= Edward Ellsworth Underwood =

American physician (1864–1942)

- Born: June 7, 1864; Mount Pleasant Township, Jefferson County, Ohio, U.S,
- Died: May 31, 1942 (aged 77); Frankfort, Kentucky, U.S.
- Burial place: Frankfort Cemetery
- Other name: E. E. Underwood
- Education: Case Western Reserve University
- Occupations: Medical doctor, minister, community leader, teacher, writer, newspaper editor
- Political party: Republican
- Spouse: Sara J. Walker
- Children: 2

Edward Ellsworth Underwood (June 7, 1864 – May 31, 1942) was an American medical doctor, minister, and community leader. He was Black, and an organizer of the NAACP chapter in Frankfort, Kentucky. Additionally he worked as a teacher, writer, and newspaper editor. The Mayo–Underwood School in Frankfort was named in part in his honor.

== Early life and education ==
Edward Ellsworth Underwood was born on June 7, 1864, in Mount Pleasant Township, Jefferson County, Ohio, to parents Harriet (née Clanton) and Rev. Johnson P. Underwood. He attended schools in Mount Pleasant, and graduated from Mount Pleasant High School in 1881.

After graduating high school, Underwood taught at the Emerson Colored School in Dayton, Ohio, from 1881 until 1888. He became licensed to preach with the African Methodist Episcopal Church (AME) at age 19.

Underwood completed his medical degree in 1891 at Western Reserve University (now Case Western Reserve University) in Cleveland.

== Career ==
Underwood had a private medical practice from 1891 until 1942, in Frankfort. He was the assistant city physician in Frankfort from 1897 until 1900, and the first African American to hold this role. He was president of the Kentucky Medical Society. Additionally he was the physician for Kentucky State College for Negroes (now Kentucky State University).

Underwood was one of the founders in 1919 of the National Association for the Advancement of Colored People (NAACP) branch in Frankfort. He also served as the first president of the NAACP branch.

Underwood was editor for 10 years of the Bluegrass Bugle, an African American weekly newspaper. He was a member of many organizations and held offices, including the Masons, Knights Templar, Knights of Pythias, Independent Order of Odd Fellows, the Union Benevolent Society, and United Brothers of Friendship.

He was active in Republican politics in the state of Kentucky. He organized the first State League of Colored Republicans Clubs of Kentucky in 1898 and served as the first president.

== Death and legacy ==
He died on May 31, 1942, in Frankfort and was buried at Frankfort Cemetery.

The Mayo–Underwood School in Frankfort, Kentucky was named in part in his honor.

== Publications ==
- Underwood, E. E. (1906). A Brief History of the Colored Churches of Frankfort, Kentucky. Frankfort, KY: Bugle Publishing Company.
