= Freight house =

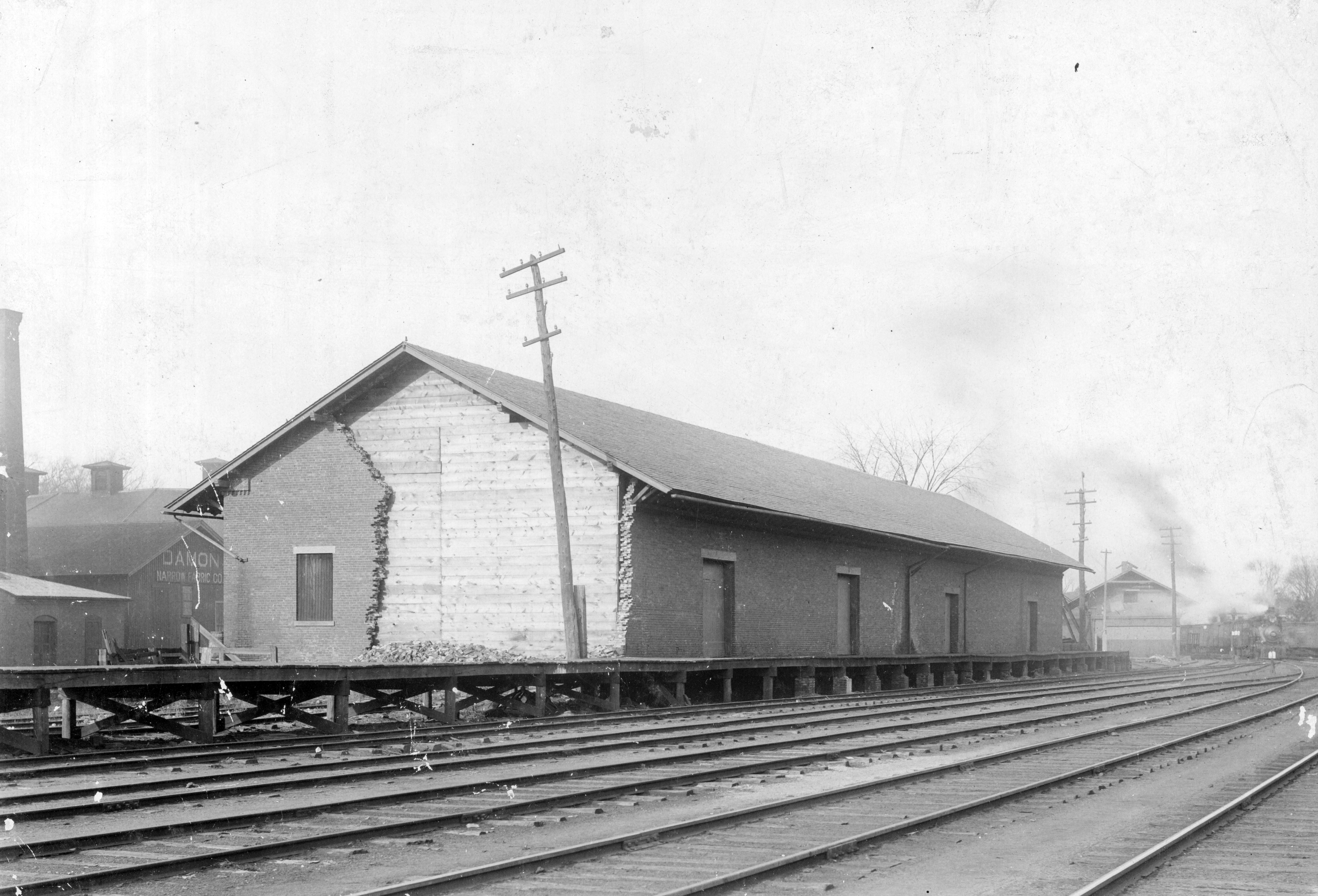
This freight house has a typical arrangement of loading doors adjacent to the house track.

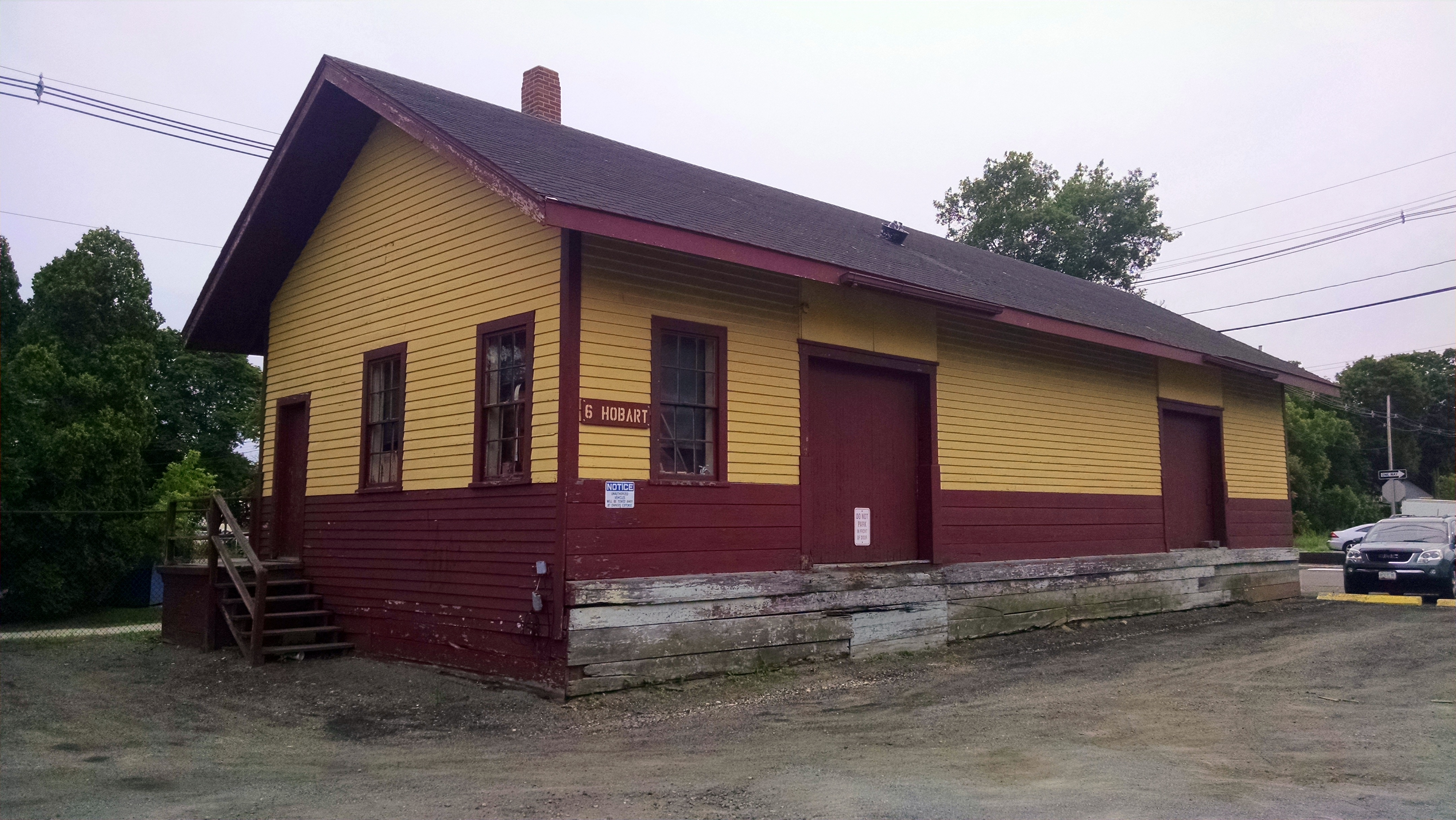
This freight house with a small agent's office in the near end of the structure has two doors for loading trucks.

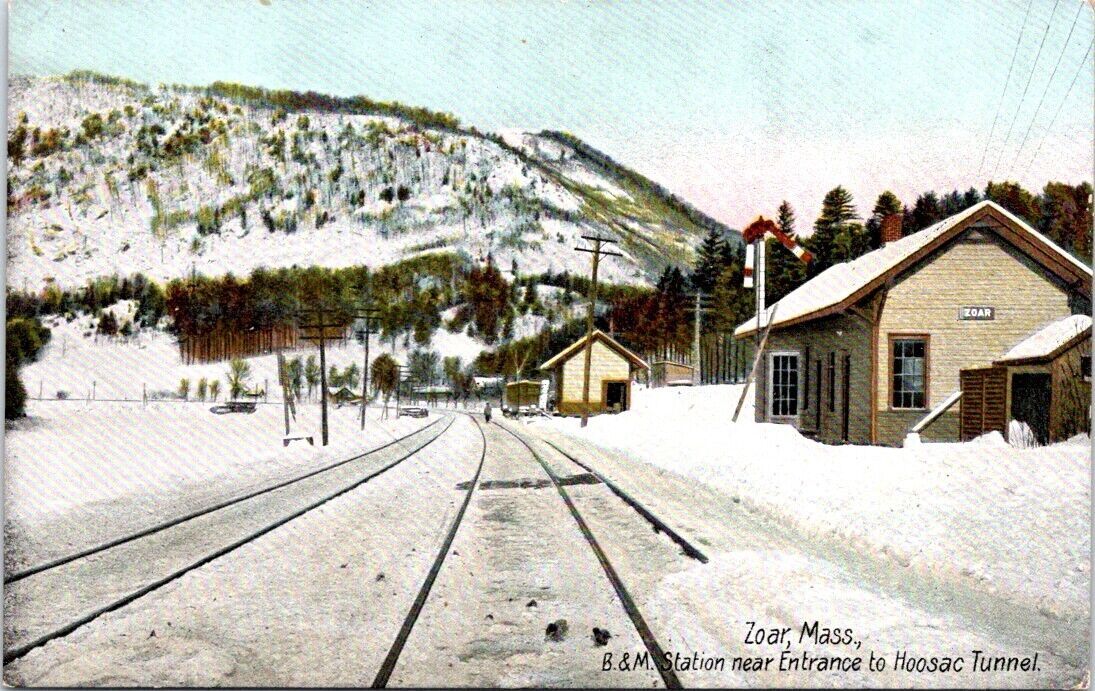
This town has a small freight house in the background near the passenger depot in the right foreground.

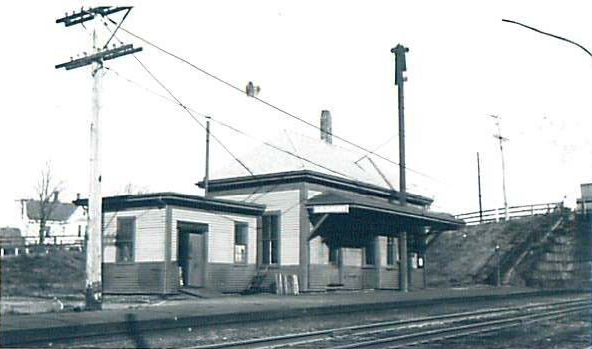
Distance from the track made load transfer less convenient at this very small freight house left of the passenger depot.

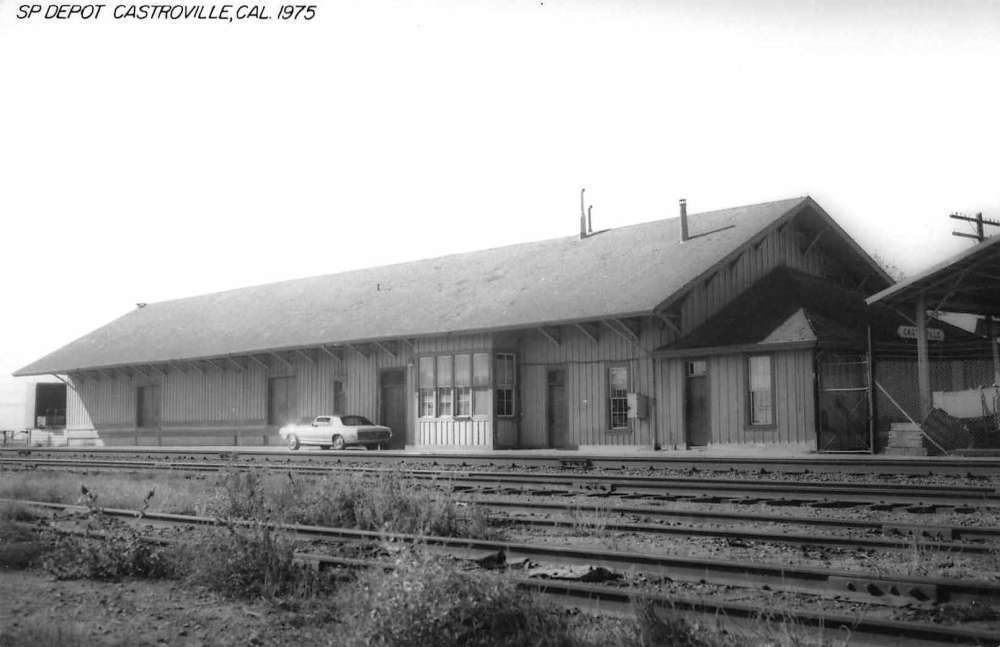
This multipurpose building is a freight house on the left end and a passenger depot on the right end.

A freight house, in North America, is a building owned and operated by a railroad for receiving, loading, unloading, and temporary storage of less-than-car load (LCL) freight. Having a protected area for temporary freight storage improves efficiency by allowing railroads to accommodate customers' delivery and pickup schedules without leaving boxcars idle at loading points and destinations. A typical freight house has at least one trackside door with one or more doors for trucks or wagons to load and unload on the opposite side of the building.

== House tracks ==
The track adjacent to the freight house is called a house track. Boxcars are positioned on the house track with their door adjacent to the freight house door, so a portable short steel bridge can be positioned allowing wheeled vehicles to move between the freight house and boxcar while loading and unloading. Some freight houses use several parallel house tracks by carefully positioning boxcars on the more distant house tracks adjacent to boxcars on the closest house tracks so boxcars on the inner tracks serve as a bridge to boxcars on the outer tracks; but providing a platform between the house tracks allows more flexible positioning of boxcars on the more distant house tracks.

== Procedures ==
Larger communities might have separate freight houses for inbound and outbound freight. Railroad employees in the outbound or receiving freight house take freight in through the doors on the driveway side; and inspect it, weigh it, and handle billing and marking before moving it into boxcars on the house track. Inbound or receiving freight houses are typically wider to allow temporary storage of freight unloaded from boxcars before the customer is ready to load it. Both functions are combined in a single freight house which is the more common installation in smaller communities.

== Variations for larger cities ==
Most freight houses are single-story structures, but some have been built with multiple levels where land values are high. Upper floors may be used for storage, and the ground floor may be used for freight transfer to trucks and wagons, while elevated or subterranean house tracks serve a different level. Some rail hubs have special freight houses dedicated to sorting and transfer of LCL freight into different boxcars so freight originating from different locations may be placed in boxcars for similar destinations.

== Legacy ==
Although early railroads shipped a large percentage of freight in LCL quantities, most rail freight now moves in bulk quantities directly between mines, ports, and industrial sidings. Freight houses which were once among the larger structures in their communities have found a variety of uses when no longer needed for their original purpose. Others have been preserved as historic structures:

- Freight House (Kansas City, Missouri), constructed in 1887
- Freight House (La Crosse, Wisconsin), listed on the National Register of Historic Places in La Crosse County, Wisconsin
- Allamuchy Freight House, constructed in 1906
- Chicago, Milwaukee, St. Paul and Pacific Freight House - in Davenport, Iowa
- Delaware and Hudson Railroad Freight House (Cohoes, New York), National Register of Historic Places listings in Albany County, New York
- Paducah Freight House, constructed in 1925
- Spring Street Freight House, constructed in 1925
- Southern Indiana Railroad Freighthouse, constructed in 1901
