= Lincoln Independent Party =

- Abbreviation: LIP
- Prominent members: Arthur D. Porter; I. Willis Cole; William Warley; Willson Lovett
- Founded: 1921
- Dissolved: 1922
- Split from: Republican Party
- Merged into: Republican Party
- Newspaper: Louisville Leader; Louisville News
- Ideology: Pro-civil rights Anti-corruption

The Lincoln Independent Party (LIP) was a political party established in 1921 by young African-American leaders in Louisville, Kentucky who became disaffected with a lack of support from the Republican Party to which they had been allied against the Democratic Party's open hostility. The LIP was the manifestation of young African Americans' dissatisfaction with the status quo upheld by the Republican Party elite and the older and more conservative African-American leaders of Louisville. According to one of the several founders, Arthur D. Porter, African-Americans were "in the very unenviable of being owned by the Republican Party and hated by the Democrats." Issues for the LIP included continued segregation (despite a Republican victory), voting rights, political representation, corruption, and unequal economic opportunities.

The Republican Party instantly denounced the LIP as they had the most to lose from a successful black independent party in Louisville. Almost 100% of African Americans voted for the Republican Party during this time and according to the Louisville Leader, 26,549 of the 58,933 (45.05%) registered Republicans in Louisville were black. They accused the LIP of being supported by the Democrats and spent nearly $200,000 in its campaign to ensure an absolute defeat of the LIP. Another opposition to the LIP came in the form of older African-American leaders who feared that a sudden change in political allegiance would cause prominent whites to stop donating money to African-American issues.

In the 1921 local elections, the LIP nominated an all-black slate of candidates for all offices in Louisville and several offices in Jefferson County. The party also nominated some people for state house and senate elections. Ultimately, the LIP failed to convince African Americans to switch over from the Republican Party. In fact, the LIP only pulled 274 votes for the Louisville mayoral election compared to the Republican's 63,332. During the election black voters were beaten away from the polls by police and LIP officials weren't represented during the counting of votes. The LIP had around the same turnout for all the other offices they ran candidates and believed that the Republicans had dumped their votes in the Ohio River. Nonetheless, the LIP planted the seed for political change in Louisville that would eventually allow for the hiring of African-Americans as police and firemen and would lead to the election of the first black legislator in Kentucky.

Months after the election the LIP and the Republicans came together to make peace. During this meeting, the old leaders urged for reconciliation and a return to complete black support for the Republican Party. William Warley, one of the founders of the LIP, spoke last and proclaimed that he did not have anything to say to a group that applauded "such a truckling, pussy-footing, and self-serving speeches." Warley demanded that changes would have to be made before he would rejoin the Republican Party.

== Works cited ==
- Osborne, Cassie (1984). Kentucky government and politics. College Town Press. p. 221. ISBN 9780899174211.
- Wright, George C. (1983). "Black Political Insurgency in Louisville, Kentucky: The Lincoln Independent Party of 1921". Journal of Negro History. 68 (68): 8–23. doi:10.2307/2717456. JSTOR 2717456. S2CID 150024748.
