= David Yeiser House =

- Mayor David A. Yeiser House
- U.S. National Register of Historic Places
- U.S. Historic district – Contributing property
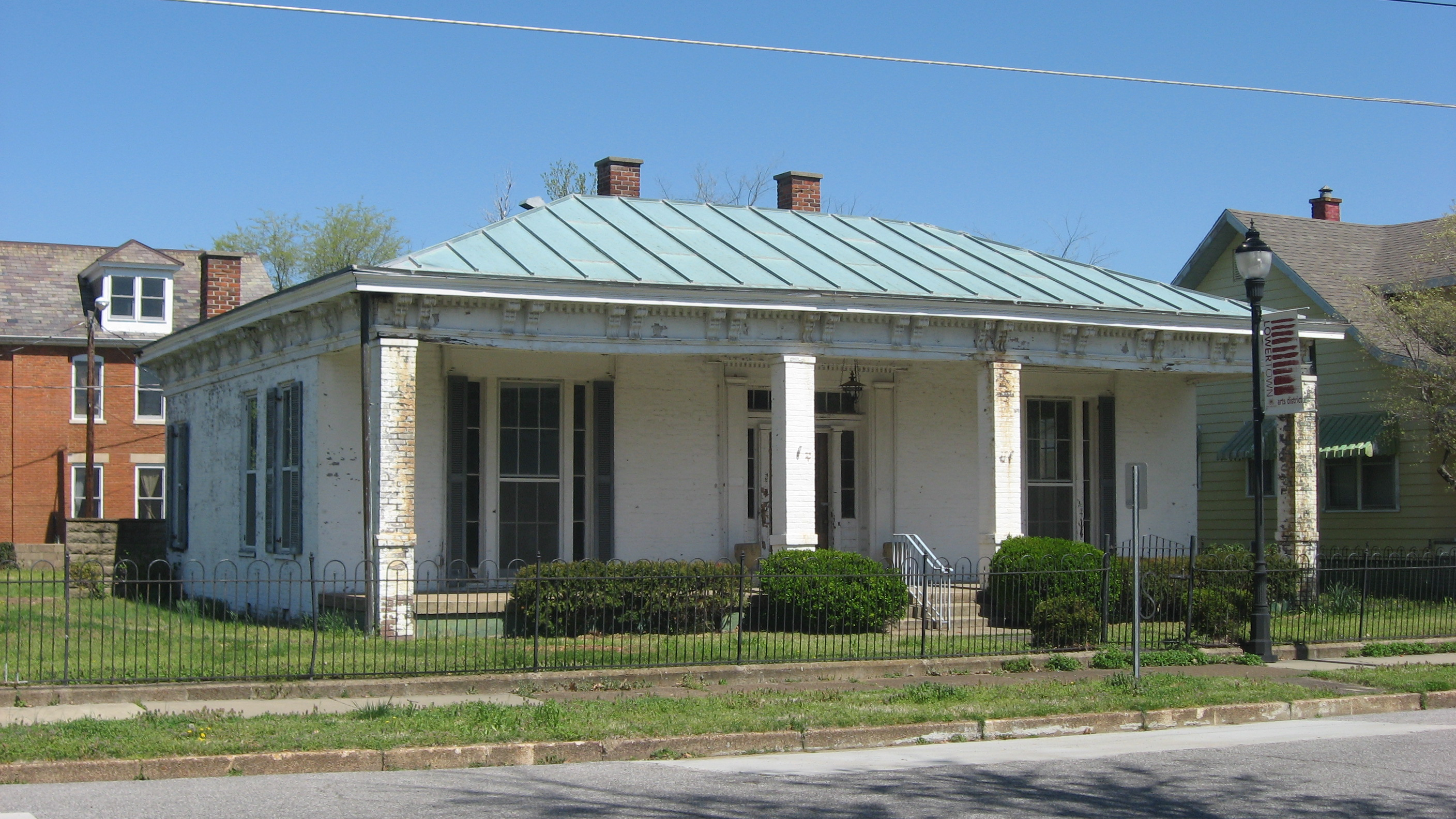
- Front of the house

- Location within Kentucky Location within the United States
- Location: 533 Madison St., Paducah, Kentucky
- Coordinates: 37°5′21″N 88°36′8″W
- Area: Less than 1 acre (0.40 ha)
- Built: 1852
- Architectural style: Greek Revival, Italianate
- Part of: Lower Town Neighborhood District (ID82002736)
- NRHP reference No.: 73002130

Significant dates
- Added to NRHP: March 7, 1973
- Designated CP: March 15, 1982

The David Yeiser House is a historic residence on the western side of Paducah, a city in the far western part of the U.S. state of Kentucky. Built in the 1850s, it is named for an early resident who served as Paducah's mayor and presided over numerous civic improvements. One of the city's few Greek Revival houses predating the 1860s, it sits on the field of a battle that resulted in the destruction of most of the houses around it. Once operated as a museum for Paducah resident Alben W. Barkley, it has been named a historic site.

== Occupants ==
When constructed in 1852, it was the home of William Smedley, owner of a wharf boat on Paducah's Ohio River landing and of a boat-supply dealership. It was later purchased by David A. Yeiser, a pharmacist and politician; during his thirteen years as mayor, the city constructed its first sewers, placed its first electric lights along the streets, and paved some of its most important streets.

After a period of deterioration, the Yeiser House underwent restoration and was converted into a museum under the operation of Paducah's Young Historians Association. Composed of students from the local high school and middle school, the adult-guided group created exhibits and interpreted the museum for visitors. The museum's focus was Paducah resident Alben Barkley, who served as Vice President of the United States under Harry S. Truman; among its exhibits were Barkley's hat and vice-presidential desk, along with photographs of him meeting individuals such as the Pope. Although named the Alben W. Barkley Museum, its exhibits were not completely dedicated to the vice-president; a smaller section was devoted to Paducah native Linn Boyd, a four-year Speaker of the United States House of Representatives.

== Architectural history ==
Paducah annexed the Lower Town neighborhood in 1836. The neighborhood's built environment is highly varied, ranging from the earlier Greek Revival style to the later Queen Anne, and also including numerous vernacular structures such as shotguns. Very few of the buildings predate the 1860s: during the Civil War, the Battle of Paducah was fought in the neighborhood. Confederate invaders sought to attack the nearby Union-controlled Fort Anderson, and after the invaders were repulsed, the Union commander ordered that the nearby houses be destroyed in order to deny future invaders the opportunity of approaching the fort by sneaking through the houses. Chief among the few surviving pre-war buildings on the battlefield is the Yeiser House; like most of the other survivors, it is Greek Revival in style, although it differs from most contemporary Kentucky houses because of the sheltered porch on its facade.

== Structure ==
One story tall, the Yeiser House is a brick structure with a shallow hip roof pierced by a pair of chimneys on the roofline. Its walls, fully 1 foot (0.30 m) thick, are divided into three bays on the facade. Both Greek Revival and Italianate styling are present: ornamental brackets form a cornice for the roof of the front porch, which is supported by four square columns of brick; the porch is approximately 9 feet (2.7 m) deep and 50 feet (15 m) wide. Located in the facade is the main entrance, framed by sidelights, a transom window, and a pair of elaborate pilasters.

The Yeiser House's appearance from the street is virtually identical to its original appearance. From the rear, the appearance is substantially different: during the 1940s, a porch on the western side of the house was enclosed and made part of the house, and one of the original chimneys were removed. Greater differences were made at the same time to the interior: two fireplaces were destroyed, the bathroom was updated, and the furniture was replaced.

== Preservation ==
In March 1973, the Yeiser House was added to the National Register of Historic Places, qualifying both because of its architecture and because of its connection to Yeiser. It was the first McCracken County location to be given this designation, although the Market House downtown was listed approximately three months later. Among the twenty-eight other National Register locations in the county is the Lower Town Neighborhood District, which encompasses part or all of eighteen city blocks in the neighborhood; the Yeiser House is among the most important of the contributing properties in the historic district.

Despite the historic status of its building, the Alben W. Barkley Museum is no longer in existence: a single history teacher had supported the museum with both personal efforts and finances, and after the money ran out in 2008, the museum closed. Board members announced the closure at the beginning of August; the city bought the building, and the contents were split up, with some going to the museum in the Market House and others going to other museums.
