= African-American neighborhoods in Lexington, Kentucky =

African American history in Lexington, Kentucky

African-American neighborhoods in Lexington, Kentucky were established after the Civil War.

== History ==
African-American life changed drastically as protections of the Thirteenth, Fourteenth, and Fifteenth Amendments legislated rights for formerly enslaved people during Reconstruction. Cities in America saw rapidly growing urban black populations as African-Americans migrated toward urbanity. For southern communities, while African-American enclaves had existed within towns and cities across the South long before the Civil War, it was not until after the conflict that large residential neighborhoods began to form among such groups. This growth of urban black clusters occurred during the first twenty years after the war. One such antebellum confluence could be seen in Lexington, Kentucky, which became a center for black refugees that sought protection in a time where legal status became contradictory. With time, communities began to form within Lexington, including areas on, what was then, the outskirts of town. Places such as Adamstown, Brucetown, Davis Bottom, Goodlowtown, Kinkeadtown, and Pralltown were neighborhoods in which large amounts of African-American families and individuals found themselves surveying the changing landscapes around them during the antebellum period. While some of these neighborhoods still exist today, many have been removed via policy of the local government, or through the expansion of private developments.

== Adamstown ==
Adamstown was an African-American neighborhood located in Lexington, Kentucky in the period 1872 - 1943. The community established itself after George M. Adams began selling land to working class citizens that would become individual residents. Over time the neighborhood would grow, becoming residence to a total of 65 African-American families by 1880. Positioned at the bottom of a hill, the area was considered at the edge of the city situated where Adams Street was (near Euclid Avenue today). However, with time, the community would become displaced as expansion of the city, specifically in respect to the University of Kentucky (UK) and its construction of Memorial Coliseum, would ultimately lead to the removal of the neighborhood. Today, Adamstown no longer exists. The only sign of its presence is through that of a placard next to the Coliseum.

== Brucetown ==
Brucetown was an African-American neighborhood located in Lexington, Kentucky that was established in 1865. The community was formed by W. W. Bruce, who parceled and provided the land for his newly freed slaves, which had become employed by him for hemp manufacturing after the Civil War. Adjacent to Bruce's hemp factory, the land is now considered the area just north of Seventh Street. This area saw notable conflict, specifically in racial divide. Brucetown made national news in January 1878, where, following the hanging of an African-American man who was suspected to have murdered a white man, a mob formed that attacked Brucetown, killing an individual named Tom Turner in the process. Brucetown remains a prominent part of Lexington and the city's overall history. The Brucetown Neighborhood Association holds an annual festival, Brucetown day, for the public in August each year.

== Davis Bottom ==
Davis Bottom, also referred to as Davistown, is an African-American neighborhood located in Lexington, Kentucky that was established in 1865. A small, working-class neighborhood, this locality became home to thousands of European, African-American, and Appalachian families during mass-transits of migration toward the city. Before its creation, the area included a creek, marshlands, pastures, a coal yard, and two quarries, with a railroad line running across its northern boundary, whereas a civil war fort, Fort Clay, remained at its southern ridge. In December 2010, a team of archaeologists excavated the site where two homes once stood, finding a privy composed of thimbles, buttons, and trash, as survey went underway for the Newtown Pike Extension. The extension has displaced residents among the southern portion of the neighborhood.

== Goodlowtown ==
Goodlowtown, also referred to as Goodloetown, or Goodloe, is an African-American neighborhood that was established around 1871. Named after William Cassius Goodloe, the district was the largest of any black residential area in Lexington, Kentucky. A total of 290 African-American families resided in these areas by 1880. It was centered around Race, Second, Third, Fourth, and Fifths streets, even coming to envelop other neighborhoods such as Gunntown and Bradley Bottoms by 1887. Today, it remains a highly-prominent African-American community, although considered “shielded from view” by the thoroughbred park that is now in place nearby.

== Kinkeadtown ==
Kinkeadtown was an African-American neighborhood located in Lexington, Kentucky that was established between 1865 - 1870. This historic section of Lexington was created when George Blackburn Kinkead parceled the land near his home to be divided and sold to African Americans. Residents would build shotgun and T-plan houses, although such homes would later become destroyed for an extension of Rose Street. Kinkeadtown, itself, would come to extinction as its inhabitants gained better social and economic status. However, a testament of the neighborhood can be visited at the George B. Kinkead House, home to the Living Arts and Science Center.

== Pralltown ==
Pralltown is an African-American neighborhood located in Lexington, Kentucky that was established between 1868 - 1877. It is considered the oldest subdivision in Lexington. It was established by lawyer and state legislator John Andrew Prall. The community was said to be formed by Colonel John Andrew Prall, who founded the enclave for newly freed African Americans after the Civil War. By 1940, it encompassed over 200 houses. Pralltown has had attempts by the local government to undertake renewal projects. An interview was done in 1978 with a long-time resident of the community.

== See also ==
- List of African American neighborhoods
- List of U.S. metropolitan areas with large African-American populations
- List of U.S. communities with African American majority populations
