= Bruceton =

Bruceton can refer to:

- Bruceton, Tennessee, a town
- Bruceton, Pennsylvania, an unincorporated suburb of Pittsburgh
- Bruceton Subdivision, a railroad line in Tennessee

== See also ==
- Bruceton Mills, West Virginia
- Bruceton analysis of explosives
