= History of African Americans in Kentucky =

Ethnic group in Kentucky

African Americans in Kentucky
Total population
- 361,230 (2020)

Regions with significant populations
- Louisville, Fort Campbell, the western tip of the state and parts of the Bluegrass Region

Languages
- Southern American English, African American English, African American Vernacular English, African languages

Religion
- Protestantism (Black Protestant) with smaller numbers of Catholics, Muslims, Buddhists and others

Black Kentuckians are residents of the state of Kentucky who are of African ancestry. The history of Blacks in the US state of Kentucky starts at the same time as the history of White Americans; Black Americans settled Kentucky alongside white explorers such as Daniel Boone. As of 2019, according to the U.S. Census Bureau, African Americans make up 8.5% of Kentucky's population. Compared to the rest of the population, the African American census racial category is the 2nd largest.

== History ==
=== Arrival ===
The first white explorer of the Ohio valley, Christopher Gist, who surveyed territory along the Ohio river in 1751, was accompanied by a Black "servant"; they found another Black man, enslaved in an Indian village, on the Scioto River (now Ohio). Daniel Boone, on his exploratory trips to the west, also had African Americans in his groups. One of them guided him across the Blue Ridge Mountains in 1760, and a number of them were included in the group that tried to settle with him in Kentucky in 1773. In 1775, Boone led another group of settlers into Kentucky, including many Black people. They settled near present-day Richmond where they encountered several attacks by Native Americans. Blacks played an integral role in the defense of Boonesborough in 1778. Alongside the whites, African Americans fought to protect their frontier. They knew that if they fled, they could die from wild animals, Indian attacks, and starvation. Instead they stayed, enduring a life of slavery.

=== Slavery and black population ===
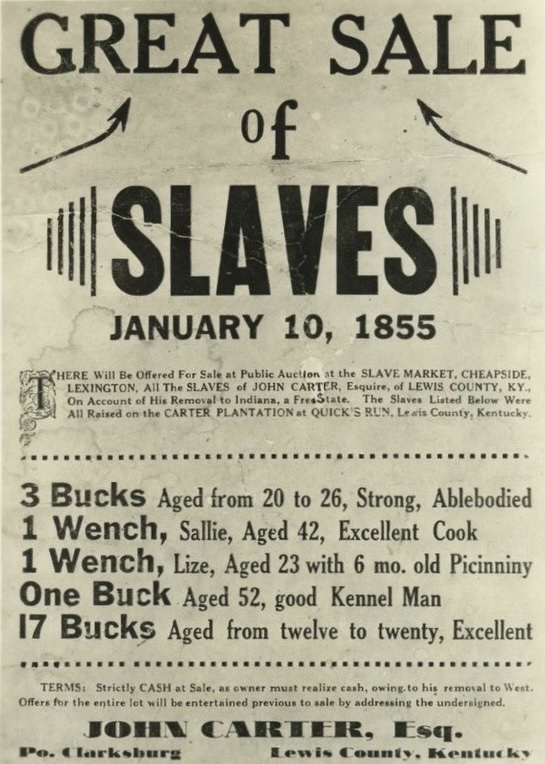
Slave ad in Kentucky

In 1792, Kentucky drafted up its first constitution, a close reflection of Virginia's. When it came to slavery, those who were considered slaves in Virginia were also slaves in Kentucky. In addition to the constitution, in 1798 the Kentucky legislature enforced slave codes which stated that all black people of Kentucky, free or enslaved, were inferior in status of all aspects of life. Much of their slave work was steps to improving civilization. This included clearing trees to build cabins and fences.

The black population grew as more people came along with their slaves. As early as 1777, Blacks made up about 10% of Kentucky residents. In 1784, Kentucky was estimated to have 4,000 Blacks. In 1790, the black population grew to 16% with 11,830 slaves and 114 freemen. Then in 1800, the population was up to 19% with 41,084 black residents. The freeman population also increased to 741 people within that decade. After 1790, the population of blacks steadily increased by 2% each decade, hitting its highest point of 24.7% in 1830. There were 165,213 slaves and 4,917 freemen. At this point, Blacks were growing faster than the white population, but soon after, there was a slow decline. This was a result of a lesser need for a large labor force as well as a law in 1833 banning the importation of slaves and southern slave trade. In 1860, Kentucky's black population was at 20% with 236,167 Blacks.

African American slaves cultivated hemp and tobacco for white slave owners.

=== Mid 1800s ===
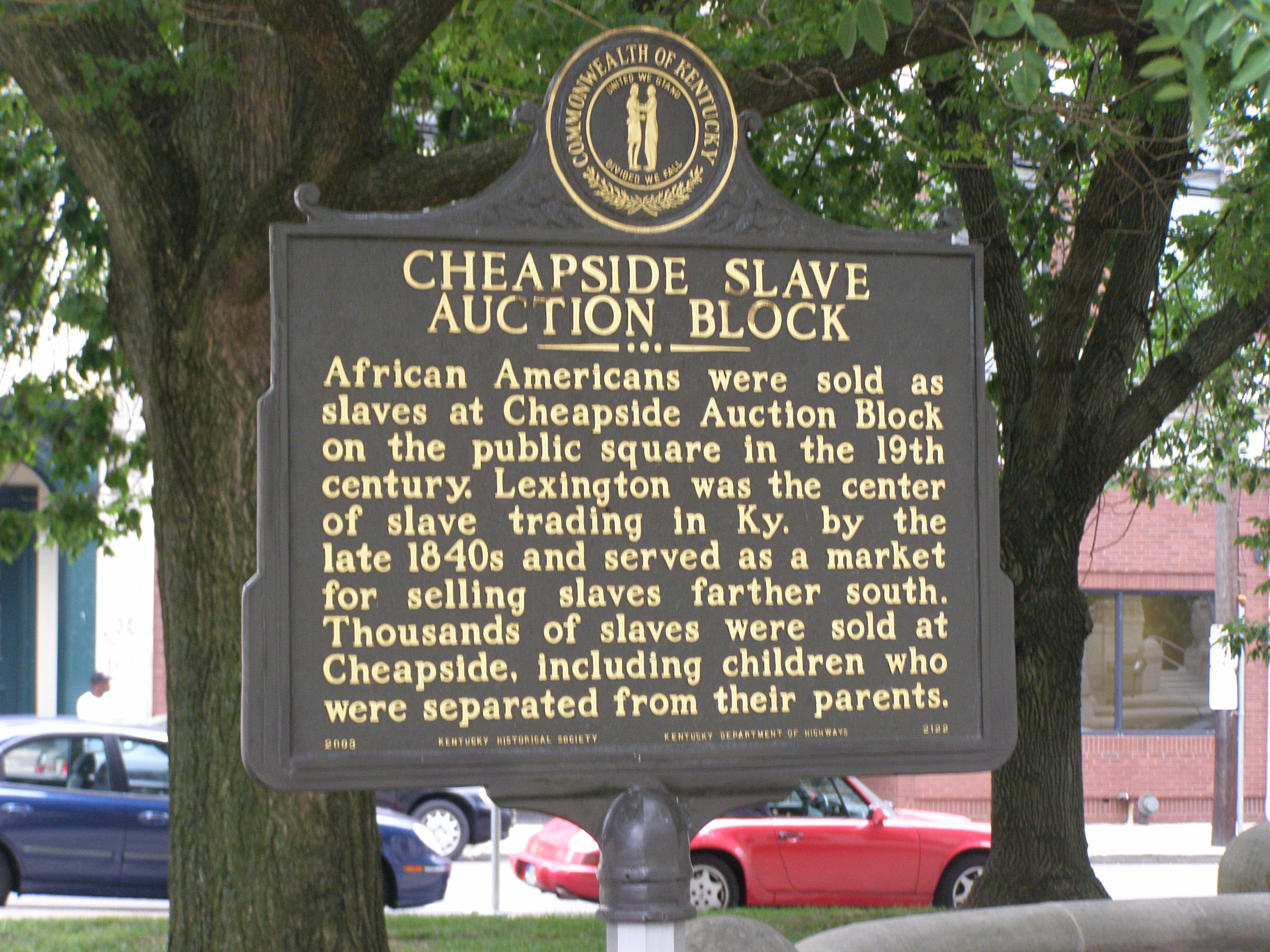
Lexington was the center of slave trading in Kentucky by the late 1840s.

Most people started settling beyond the mountains of eastern Kentucky. In almost all counties, the black population was fewer than 10%. Many Blacks settled in towns, rather than the countryside, signifying that they were laborers or household servants. The northern counties had undesirable soil, making it hard to grow crops. Western and Central Kentucky with fertile soil and southern climate developed large tobacco plantations with the use of slave labor. Slave labor in these areas made the black population grow slowly. From 1830 to 1860 the population of Blacks only grew from 7,920 to 9,982.

=== Civil War and recognitions ===
From the start of the war, Kentucky slaves had the goal of obtaining their own freedom for the benefit of themselves and their families. Newspapers were documenting numerous slave runaways. In May 1861, the states were fearful of slave revolts. As Northern troops arrived into Kentucky, slaveholders attempted to keep the slaves from hearing abolitionist ideas. Blacks learned about the war anyway, and how it would have an effect on slavery. They gained this information by eavesdropping on council meetings and getting literate women to read to them stories from the war.

Large groups of slaves were fleeing Kentucky to north of the Ohio River, in search for freedom. Other slave groups were escaping to Indiana. Despite the orders of the army in Kentucky, soldiers would let Blacks join the lines. September 1862, reports from an Ohio soldier said that about 600 slaves entered the Union troops in Lebanon, Kentucky. Slaves realized that they had authority and protection now that they were with the army.

In 1865, the 13th Amendment to the U.S. Constitution was ratified, ending slavery. Kentucky, however, did not ratify the amendment until 1976. This is because there was resistance from both the government and the slave owners in Kentucky. They believed that since they did not all betray the Union and fully side with the Confederacy as there was dueling Unionist and Confederate state governments in Kentucky, that they would be able to keep their slaves. Despite the resistance Abraham Lincoln tried to negotiate with them, even offering 300 dollars per slave to owners, but this was turned down. In the end they got nothing and had to ratify the amendment in 1976.

In total, there were about 25,000 African American Kentuckians who served in the United States Colored Troops (USCT) in the Civil War. This made up nearly one-third of the union soldiers in Kentucky. Besides Louisiana, Kentucky has the most black men serve in the Civil War. Enlisting into the war was delayed, but once they could, almost half were prepared and sent to Camp Nelson in Jessamine County. A monument located in Greenhill Cemetery in Frankfort is one of the few monuments that recognizes African Americans in the war. Engraved on one side is "In Memory of the Colored Soldiers Franklin County, Kentucky Who Fought in the Civil War 1861–1865". The rest of the sides include 142 names of African American soldiers.

=== Jim Crow era ===
The Jim Crow era was a period in history marked by racial segregation. This meant all public areas such as schools, churches, and neighborhoods were separated by race. The establishment of segregated schools in Kentucky happened in 1874. It wasn't until 1884, in the Claybrook v. Owensboro lawsuit, when legal action was taken to receive equal funding of public education. However, black schools still did not have access to the same resources as the whites. They lacked books, supplies, equipment, and even building construction. In 1896, the Plessy v. Ferguson case ruled that being separate but equal was constitutional. This led Kentucky to outlaw the integration of higher education by enforcing the Day Law. Throughout Kentucky there were measures other than school systems taking part in segregation. The Eastern State Hospital in Lexington, Kentucky segregated the mentally ill patients. There were residential segregation ordinances passed in Madisonville, Kentucky and Louisville, Kentucky, continuing the divide of whites and Blacks. Later on, in the 1950s and 1960s, civil rights movements were slowly ending the Jim Crow era.

=== Civil Rights movement (1950-1996) ===
Starting from the Day Law in 1950, some universities started admitting Blacks. These include Kentucky State College, Berea College, University of Louisville, and Bellarmine University. Also in 1950, as a result of Hardinsburg hospital refusing emergency care to three black men, a black man died in the waiting-room floor. This led to a new law prohibiting the hospital license of anyone who denies emergency health care.

In 1954, the Brown v. Board of Education of Topeka required segregation of schools to stop. The University of Kentucky finally admitted black students being one of the earlier Southern states to desegregate. There was also open admittance at Russellville, Prestonsburg, Owensboro, Waynes County, and Lexington public schools. In 1955, segregation of housing in Louisville was banned because of a suit by the NAACP. Louisville schools began integrating in 1956. However, a mob at Sturgis High School against eight black students lead governor Chandler to send the state police and National Guard to protect them from violence. Another stride was taken in 1957 when the Kentucky High School Athletic Association allowed participation of black schools in its state tournaments.

In 1960, a voter registration campaign to replace city officials was hosted in Louisville, followed by a rally and a speech featuring Dr. Martin Luther King Jr. There were demonstrations at local businesses by the Congress on Racial Equality. Discrimination in state employment was banned by the Kentucky Commission on Human Rights. In 1961, a boycott called "Nothing New for Easter" was organized to stop segregation of Louisville's local businesses. Other local commissions were created to promote equality in public accommodations and teacher employment. In 1963, Governor Bert Combs even issued the Fair Service Executive Order to increase public accommodations before it got suspended.

Also in 1963, Harry M. Sykes and Luska Twyman of Lexington and Glasgow became the first African American city council members. Later on, Twyman became the mayor of Glasgow in 1969. The Kentucky Real Estate Commission banned the use of scare tactics to force Blacks out of integrated neighborhoods. This helped form the West End Community Council, which urged peaceful integration of Louisville neighborhoods.

The Civil Rights Act of 1964 was passed by the U.S. Congress. The public accommodation bill was not supported by the Kentucky legislature, leading to a massive march of over 10,000 people in Frankfort, Kentucky. This march featured activists Dr. Martin Luther King Jr. and Jackie Robinson. A hunger strike was later held to force legislation to pass the bill, but it was never passed through the committee. In 1965, a conference on Civil Rights was held in Louisville to address employment and public accommodations. Finally, in 1966, the General Assembly passed the Kentucky Civil Rights Act that prohibited the issues talked about in the conference, while also passing laws against housing discrimination. Jesse Warders, the only black member of the General Assembly as well as a Louisville Republican, assisted the legislature to repeal the Day Law. Bardstown later adopted these laws.

In 1967, the Kentucky House of Representatives elected Mae Street Kidd. Housing ordinances to ban discrimination were passed in Kenton County, Covington, and Lexington. This was just one step in helping strengthen the ordinances against housing discrimination. In 1968, Georgia Davis Powers was elected into the Kentucky Senate, helping the General Assembly add housing discrimination to the state's Civil Rights Act. Also in 1968, there was a Louisville protest, turned violent, against police mistreatment, leading to six African American being arrested. They were charged of conspiracy of bombing the Ohio River oil refineries, but after two years of court hearings, the charges were dropped.

Louisville's local housing law was enforced in 1970, and centers were opened to help African Americans move into their new neighborhoods. In 1975, there was cross-district busing Louisville, helping the equality of public schools, while also bringing about some racial violence. In 1976, Kidd lead a campaign, encouraging the General Assembly to ratify the 13th, 14th, and 15th Amendments to the U.S. Constitution. Finally, in 1996, the state fully removed poll tax and segregated schools from its constitution.

== Notable people ==
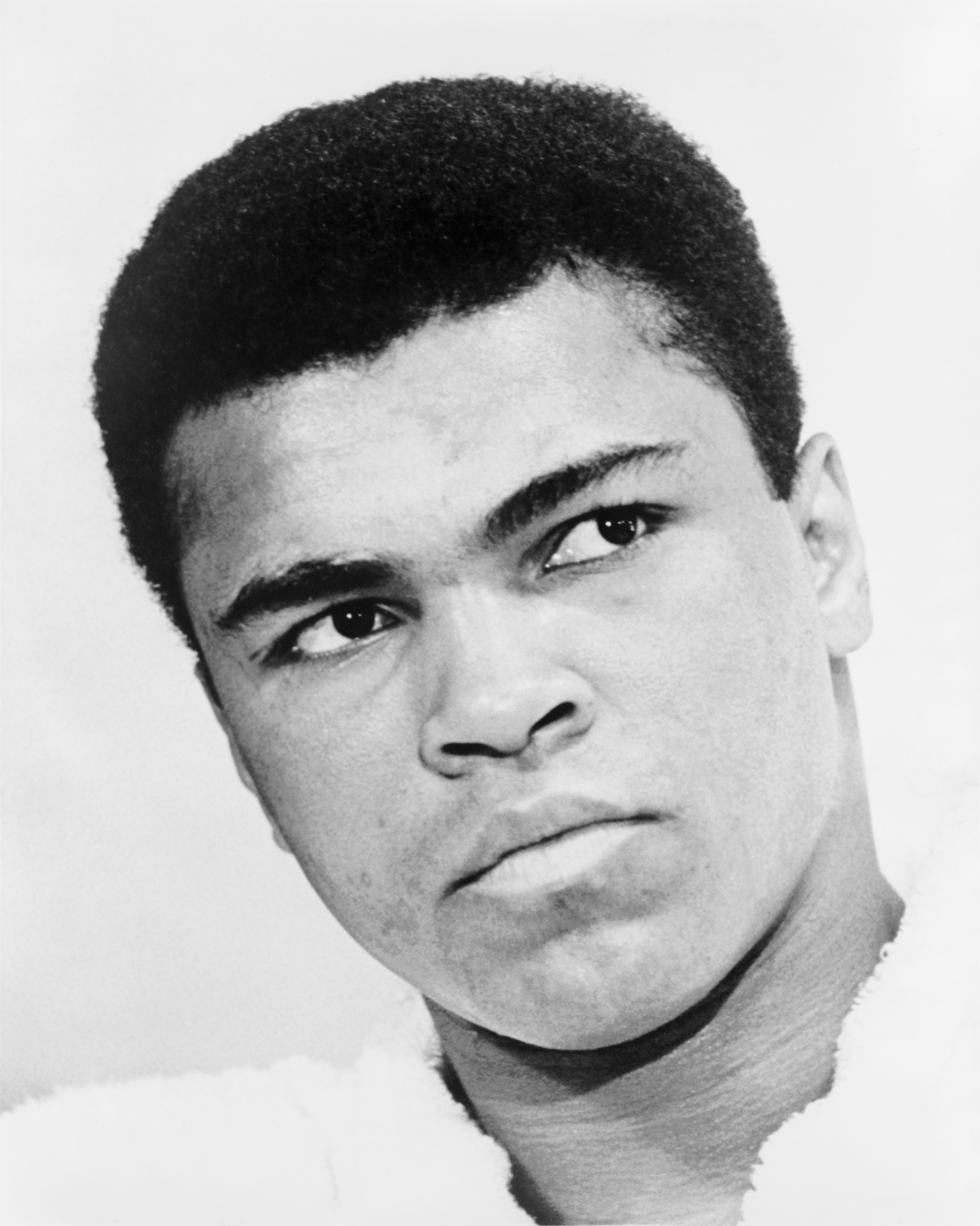
Muhammad Ali

=== 19th–21st century ===
- Muhammad Ali, professional boxer, philanthropist and activist (1942–2016)
- Mary E. Britton, physician, educator, journalist, suffragist, and civil rights activist (1855–1925)
- Willa Brown Chappell, first licensed female pilot (1906–1992)
- Anna Mac Clarke, first Kentucky woman to enlist in U.S. military after WWII and was a member of WAAC (1919–1944)
- Alice Dunnigan, newspaper writer and teacher (1906–1983)
- Lionel Hampton, jazz musician (1908–2002)
- Mae Street Kidd, businesswoman and civic leader (1909–1999)
- Garrett Morgan, inventor (1877–1963)
- Georgia Davis Powers, first African American Kentucky senator, (1923–2016)
- Moneta Sleet Jr., first African American Pulitzer Prize winner in photography (1926–1996)
- Allen Allensworth, chaplain (1842–1914)
- bell hooks, author, academic, essayist, activist, born in Kentucky and came back to her land (1952–2021).
- Toni Morrison, novelist, essayist, children's writer, professor, won the Pulitzer Prize for Fiction for writing Beloved (novel) (1987) and the Nobel Prize for Literature (1931–2019).

== See also ==
- Demographics of Kentucky
- History of slavery in Kentucky
  - List of plantations in Kentucky
- List of African-American newspapers in Kentucky
- Black Southerners
- History of Kentucky
- African-American neighborhoods in Lexington, Kentucky
