= Luska Twyman =

American politician (1913–1988)

Luska Joseph Twyman
- Born: May 19, 1913; Hiseville, Kentucky, U.S.
- Died: January 28, 1988 (aged 74); Glasgow, Kentucky, U.S.
- Burial place: Bearwallow Baptist Cemetery, Horse Cave, Hart County, Kentucky, U.S.
- Other name: Luska J. Twyman
- Education: Kentucky State College; Indiana University; Simmons College of Kentucky
- Occupations: Politician, educator

Luska Joseph Twyman (May 19, 1913 – January 28, 1988) was a Kentucky politician and educator. Twyman became Kentucky's first African American mayor in 1968 when he became mayor of Glasgow, Kentucky, the county seat for Barren County. He also was World War II veteran.

== Biography ==
Luska Joseph Twyman was born on May 19, 1913, in Hiseville, Kentucky. Twyman attended public schools in Barren County and he graduated from the Mayo–Underwood School in Frankfort, Kentucky. He was an alumnus of Kentucky State University (1938; then known as Kentucky State College), and a 1936 initiate of Kappa Alpha Psi fraternity, Alpha Upsilon chapter. Twyman also received a MS degree from Indiana University; and a LLD degree from Simmons University (later known as Simmons College of Kentucky). He was also a World War II veteran.

Twyman was an appointee of the United States Commission on Civil Rights. During his tenure as mayor, Twyman was also the principal of Ralph Bunche School (named after Ralph Bunche) in Glasgow, which originally was the city's school for African-Americans before integration. After integration in 1964, the school became the sixth-grade school for the entire Glasgow Independent Schools.

He died on January 28, 1988, in Glasgow. The Luska J. Twyman Memorial Park in Glasgow, Kentucky is named for him. Additionally historical marker #2019 in Glasgow was in his honor.

== See also ==
- List of first African-American mayors
