= St. Francis de Sales Catholic Church (Paducah, Kentucky) =

Historic church in Kentucky, United States

- St. Francis DeSales Roman Catholic Church
- U.S. National Register of Historic Places
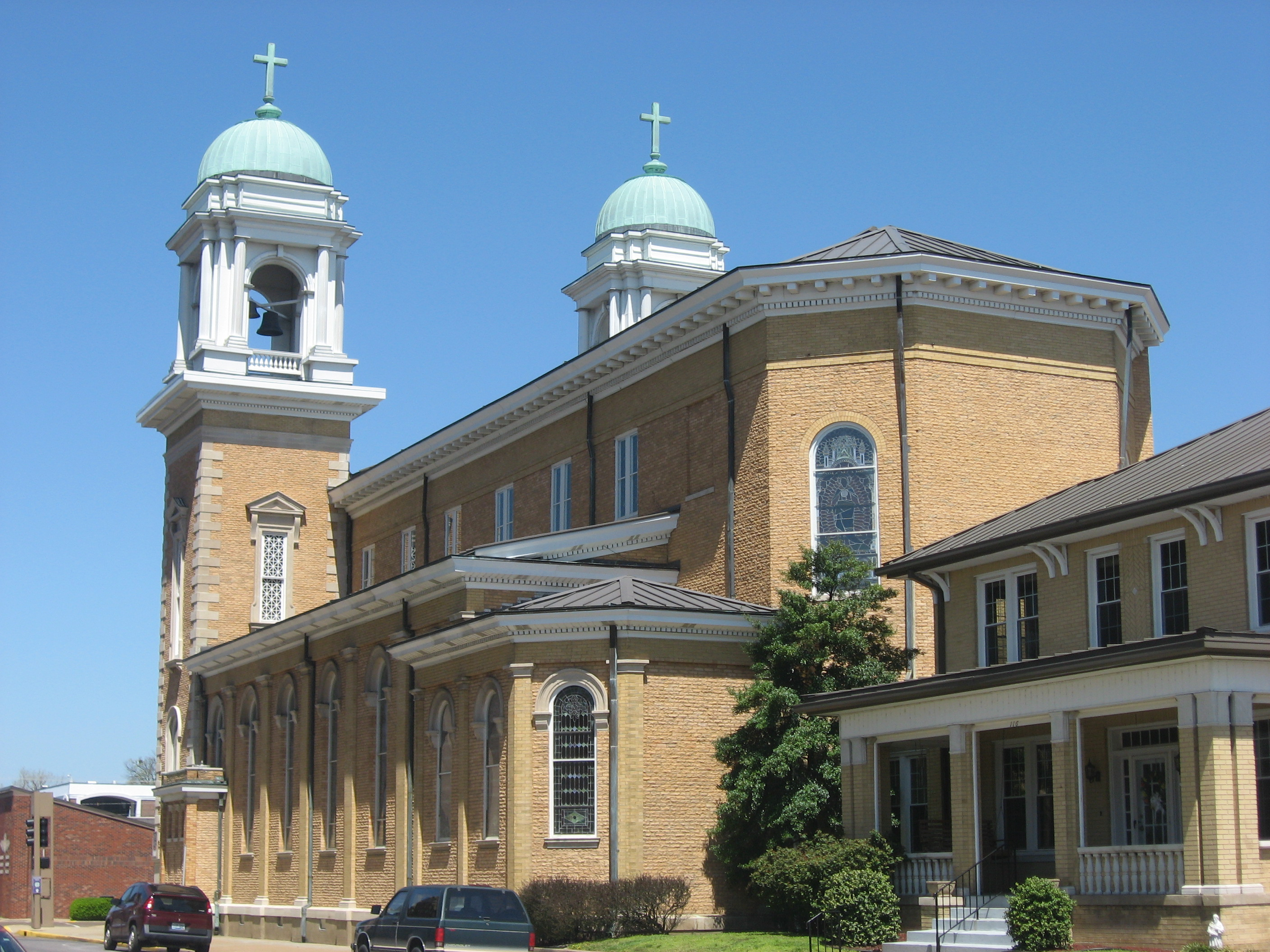
- Side of the church with its rectory

- Location within Kentucky Location within the United States
- Location: 116 S. 6th St. Paducah, Kentucky
- Coordinates: 37°5′8″N 88°36′0″W
- Area: 0.8 acres (0.32 ha)
- Built: 1899
- Architectural style: Classical Revival
- NRHP reference No.: 79003119
- Added to NRHP: April 16, 1979

The St. Francis DeSales Roman Catholic Church (Church of St. Francis de Sales) is a historic church building at 116 S. 6th Street in Paducah, Kentucky. It was built in 1899 and, together with its 1927-built rectory, was added to the National Register of Historic Places in 1979.

It is a Classical Revival-style building named for St. Francis de Sales.
