= Confederate Monument in Paducah =

- U.S. National Register of Historic Places
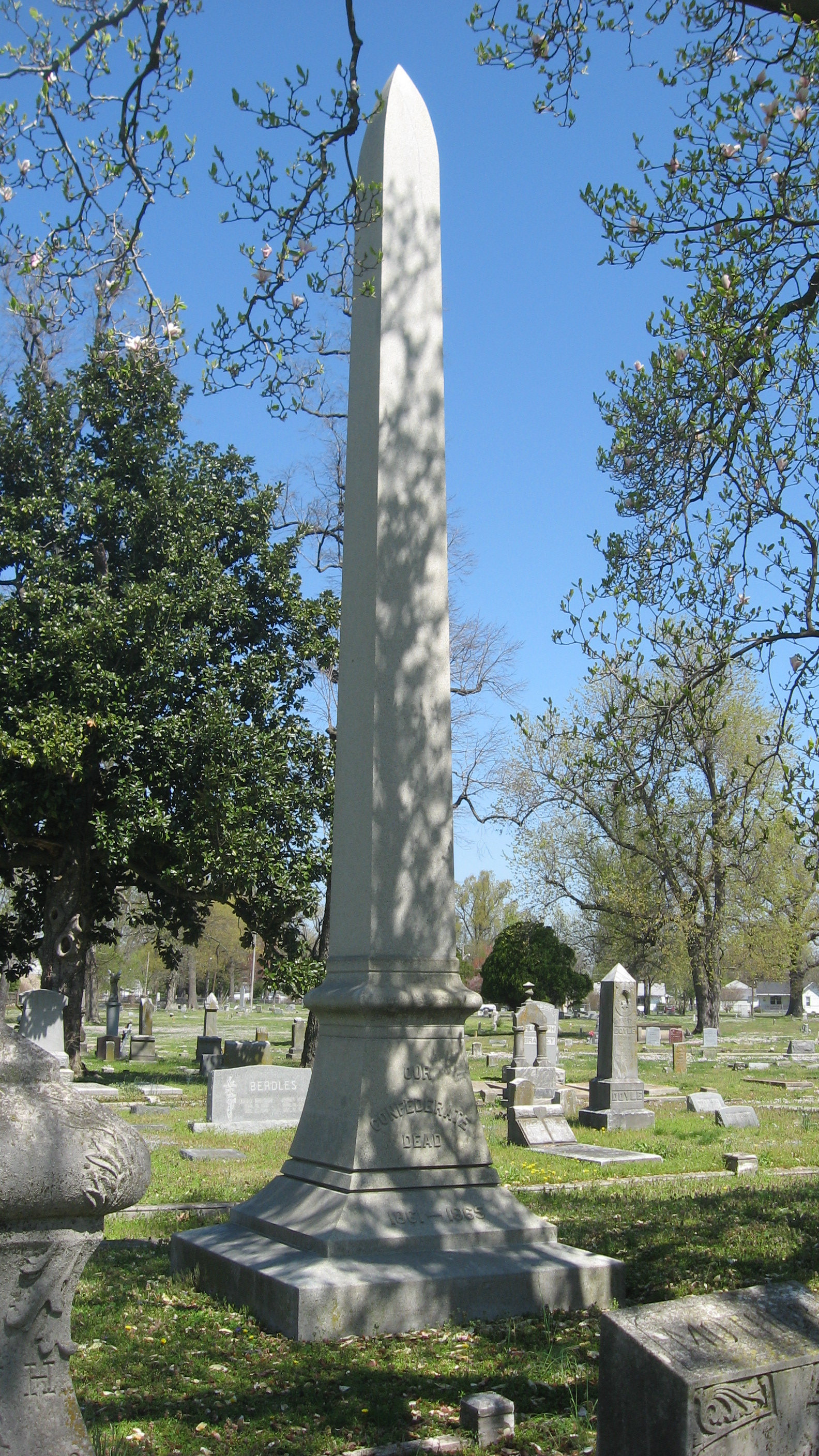
- View from the south

- Location within Kentucky Location within the United States
- Location: Oak Grove Cemetery. W of jct. of Park Ave. and 13th St., Paducah, Kentucky
- Built: 1907
- MPS: Civil War Monuments of Kentucky MPS
- NRHP reference No.: 97000678
- Added to NRHP: July 17, 1997

The Confederate Monument in Paducah, located northwest of downtown Paducah, Kentucky, is a historic monument located in Paducah's Oak Grove Cemetery.

It was built in 1907 on behalf of the United Daughters of the Confederacy. It is a 20-foot-tall (6.1 m) granite obelisk. Six Confederate war dead are buried by the monument.

On July 17, 1997, it was one of sixty-one different monuments to the Civil War in Kentucky placed on the National Register of Historic Places, as part of the Civil War Monuments of Kentucky Multiple Property Submission. One other monument on the list, the Lloyd Tilghman Memorial, is nearby.
