= Kenmil Place =

Historic house in Kentucky, United States

- U.S. National Register of Historic Places
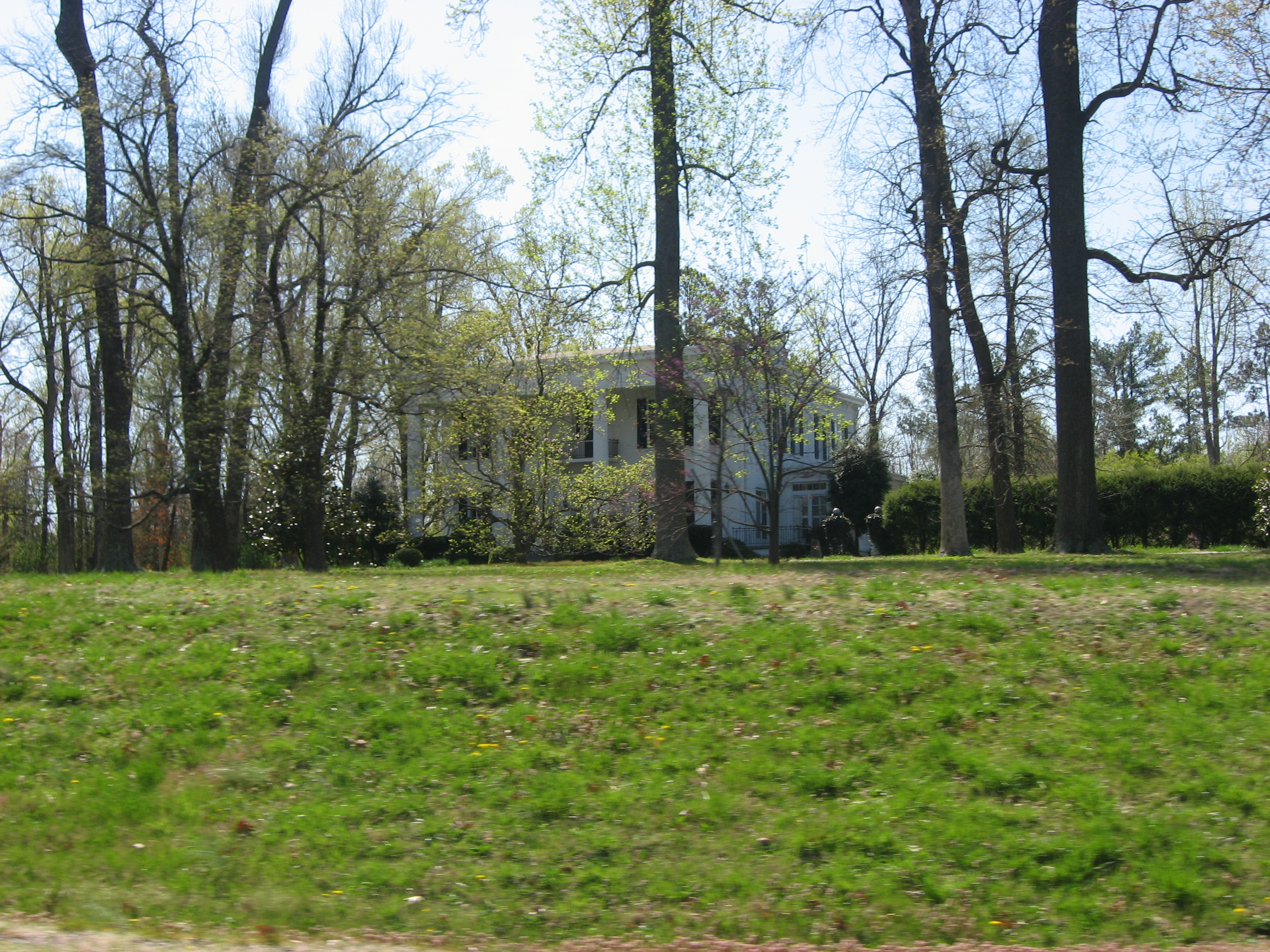
- Roadside view

- Location within Kentucky Location within the United States
- Location: 4300 Alben Barkley Dr., Paducah, Kentucky
- Coordinates: 37°3′30″N 88°38′58″W
- Area: 5 acres (20,000 m^{2})
- Built: 1869/1923
- Architect: G. Tandy Smith
- Architectural style: Classical Revival
- NRHP reference No.: 09000008
- Added to NRHP: February 11, 2009

Kenmil Place in Kentucky was listed on the National Register of Historic Places in 2009. Although the house was Italianate in style until its renovation in 1923, it is significant for its Classical Revival style, popular in Kentucky from 1895 until 1950. The building's Italianate incarnation was built in 1869, and the house was known as Brighton.

It was listed on the National Register of Historic Places in February 2009.

The property was the Highlighted Property of the Week when the National Park Service released its weekly list on February 20, 2009.
