= Lincoln School (Paducah, Kentucky) =

American public school (1894–1970)

- U.S. National Register of Historic Places
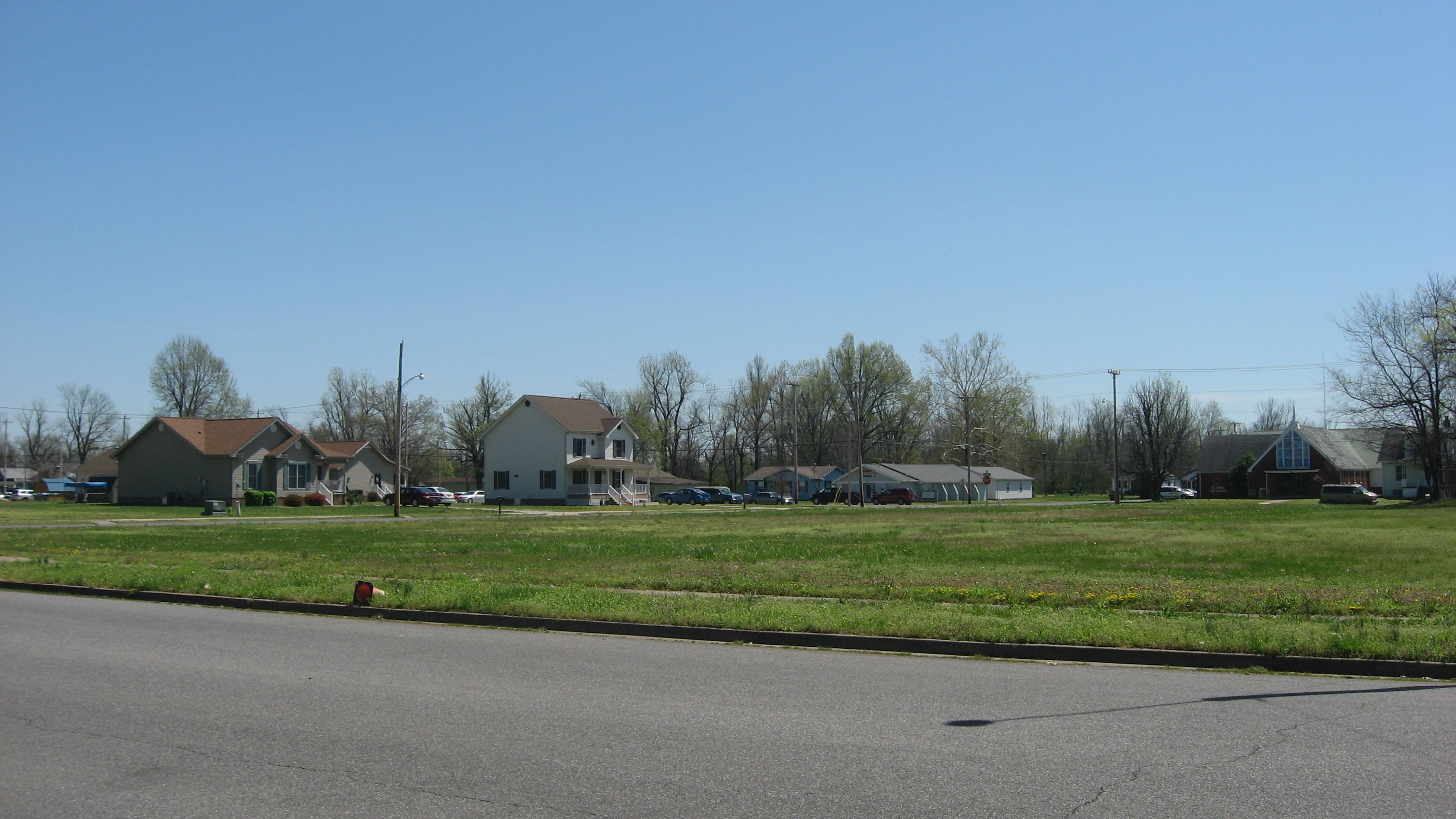
- Site of the former Lincoln School in Paducah
- Location: South Eighth Street, Paducah, McCracken County, Kentucky, U.S.
- Coordinates: 37.077778°N 88.599167°W
- Built: 1894
- Architect: Nevin, Henry & Wischmeyer
- Architectural style: Classical Revival, Italianate
- Demolished: after 1988
- NRHP reference No.: 88000895
- Added to NRHP: June 23, 1988

The Lincoln School (1894–1970), also known as Lincoln High School, was a segregated public elementary and high school for African American students, located in Paducah, Kentucky, United States. The buildings for the school complex were demolished, sometime after 1988.

It is listed on the National Register of Historic Places (NRHP) since June 23, 1988 for its contribution to educational history and ethnic heritage.

== History ==
After the formation of Central High School in Louisville in 1870, neighboring Kentucky cities established their own segregated public schools for African American students including the Lincoln School in Paducah; Paris Colored High School in Paris; the Clinton Street High School (later known as Mayo–Underwood School) in Frankfort; the William Grant High School in Covington; the Russell School in Lexington; and Winchester High School in Winchester. Garfield School (now destroyed) had been constructed in for African American students in a neighboring school district within Paducah.

Lincoln School was named in honor of former President Abraham Lincoln.

== Architecture and campus ==
The former campus is near other NRHP-listed or nominated locations for Black community history, including the Paducah Downtown Commercial District, Burks Chapel A.M.E. Church, the Black Masonic Lodge building, and Artelia Anderson Hall (formerly West Kentucky Industrial College, and West Kentucky Vocational School for Negroes).

The school campus was a complex of three buildings in a U-shaped configuration, constructed in 1894, 1921, and 1938. The earliest building was in a late-Italianate architecture style; and the 1921 and 1938 buildings were in the Classical Revival architecture style. Louisville's Nevin Henry Wischmeyer (or Hugh Nevin, Earl Henry, and Herman Wischmeyer) completed the design for the 1921 building. The additional neighboring buildings were purchased as the enrollment in the school increased (one of which was the former site of the Second Baptist Church).

== Principals ==
Former principals for Lincoln School included E. W. Benton from 1894 to 1906; G. W. Jackson from 1906 to 1915; J. G. G. Prather from 1915 to 1917; E. W. Whiteside from 1927 to 1965; and B. W. Browne in 1965. E. W. Whiteside introduced the school motto, "Enter to Learn, Depart to Serve".

== Closure ==
In 1965, the Lincoln School was consolidated into the Paducah Tilghman High School, the formerly segregated high school for White students. However the elementary school continued to operate until 1970. From 1970 to 1980, the campus was used for the Head Start Program.

== See also ==
- National Register of Historic Places listings in McCracken County, Kentucky
- List of African-American historic places
