= Paris Western High School =

Public school in Kentucky, United States

- 7th Street, Paris, Bourbon County, Kentucky; United States

Information
- Former name: Paris Western School; Paris Western City School; Paris–Western High School
- School type: Public
- Opened: September 1925
- Closed: 1964
- Color
- Mascot: Tigers

Paris Western High School, formerly Paris Western School, was a segregated public school for African American students in Paris, Kentucky, United States.

== History ==
Paris Colored High School opened in 1895 as a segregated public school for African American students in Paris. It preceded Paris Western High School which opened in September 1925, with G. W. Adams as principal, and Ennis B. Toles as assistant professor. During the 1926 commencement ceremony for Paris Western High School, politician Roscoe Conkling delivered the address to the 18 graduating students.

The school was known for their basketball team and in 1953, the school won the "National Negro High School Championship" a basketball tournament held at Tennessee State University.

Former principals at Paris Western High School included teacher G. W. Adams, Ennis B. Toles, Francis Marion Wood, and William B. Reed. Faculty included Mary E. Kellis, Orletta Elizabeth Porter Hurley.

=== Closure ===
After Brown v. Board of Education (1954), the city integration committee was led by chair, Grover Baldwin Jr. In 1963, four Black students were sent to attend Paris High School, the segregated public high school for White students. The following year in 1964, the school was consolidated and all students from Paris Western High School were moved into Paris High School. The community reaction to assimilation was rocky at best.

After the racial-integration, the former Paris Western school building was briefly used as a junior high school.

== Notable people ==
Alumni of the school include:

- Jim Tucker, basketball player
- George W. Wilson Sr., the first African American to serve in the Kentucky State Cabinet
- William "Chief" B. Reed, former city councilman

== See also ==
- History of African Americans in Kentucky
