= Lloyd Tilghman Memorial =

- U.S. National Register of Historic Places
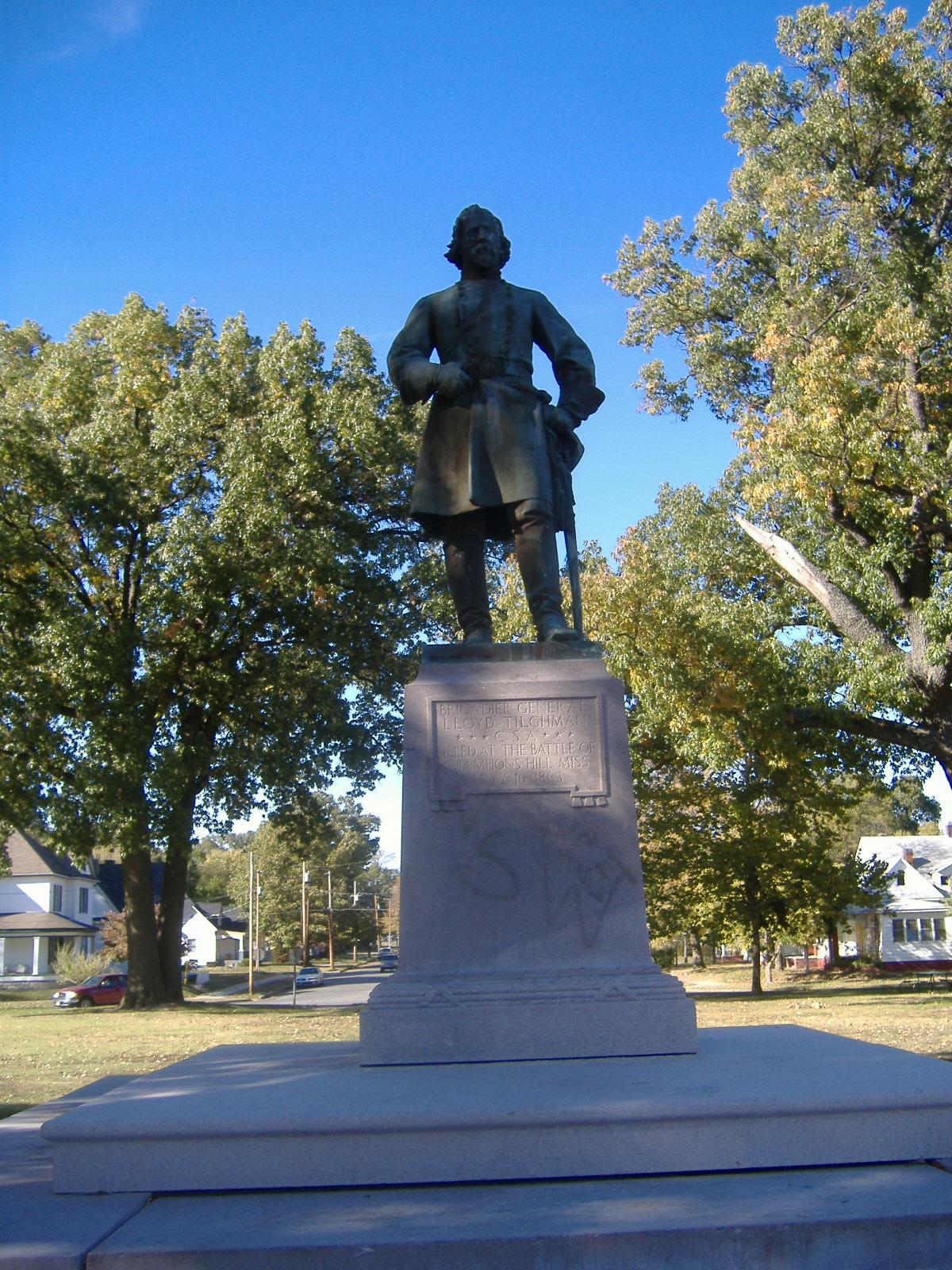

- Location within Kentucky Location within the United States
- Location: Lange Park. Madison St. between 16th and 19th Sts., Paducah, Kentucky
- Built: 1909
- Architect: Henry Hudson Kitson
- MPS: Civil War Monuments of Kentucky MPS
- NRHP reference No.: 97000679
- Added to NRHP: July 17, 1997

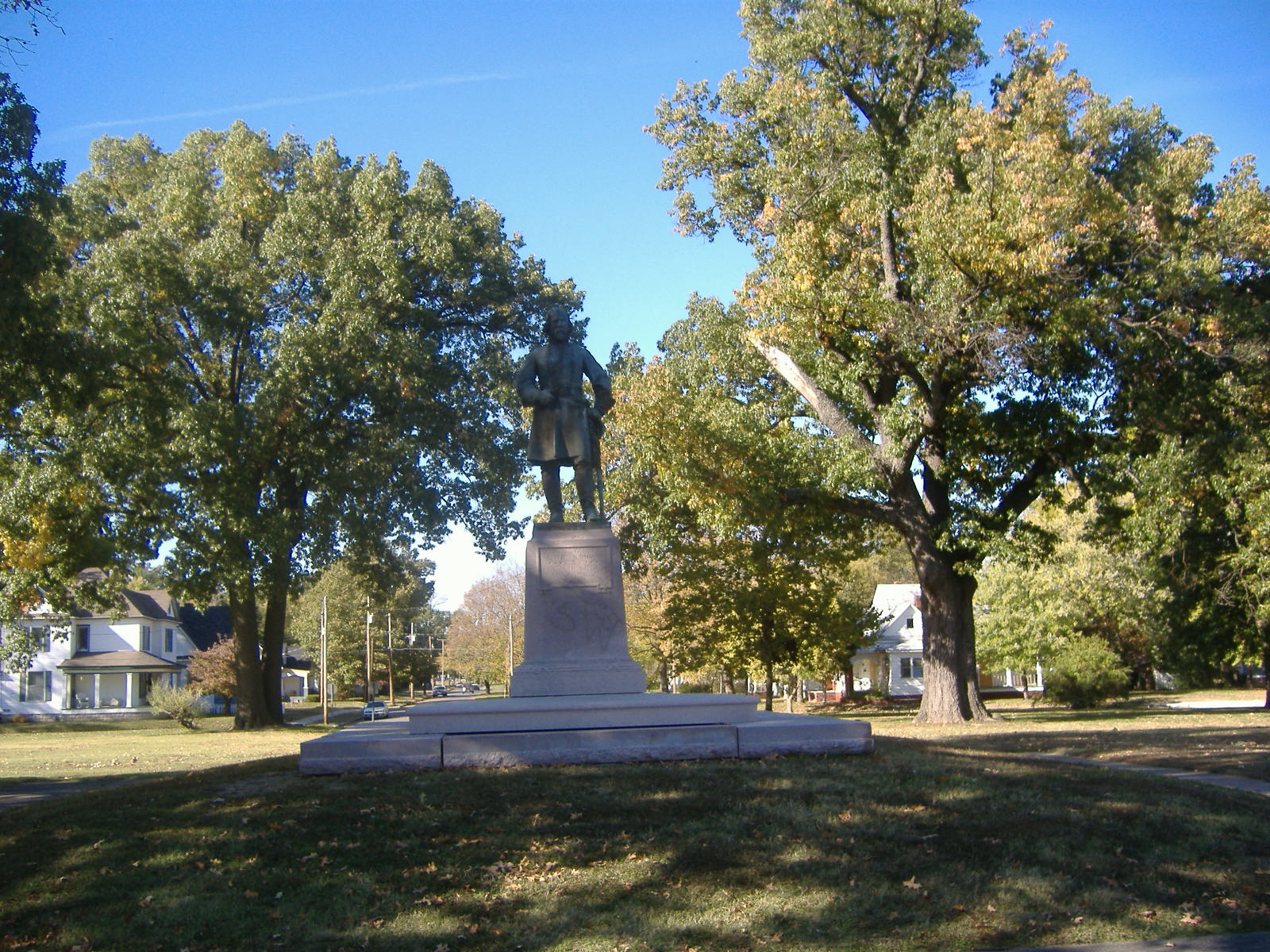
Farther view of Tilghman Memorial

The Lloyd Tilghman Memorial is a statue located in Paducah Kentucky, of Lloyd Tilghman, a brigadier general for the Confederate States of America who died at the Battle of Champion Hill in May 1863.

Lloyd Tilghman was a native of Maryland who lived in Paducah from 1852 to 1861. He joined the Confederate army on July 5, 1861, as a colonel, but was promoted to general the next October. He was placed in charge of the engineering of Fort Henry and Fort Donelson, succeeding another general, but was unable to stop the building of the militarily deficient Fort Henry until too late. He was captured at the Battle of Fort Henry, and would not return to duty until the next Fall, which led to his death during the Vicksburg Campaign.

In 1909 it was decided to honor Tilghman. Tilghman's sons Frederick and Sidell and the United Daughters of the Confederacy jointly paid for the building of the monument, with the brothers paying $10,000 and the UDC paying $5,000.

The statue was made by Henry Hudson Kitson, then a resident of Boston, Massachusetts, who emigrated from England. The statue depicting Tilghman is made of bronze, and is on top of a pink granite pedestal and base. The total height is twelve feet. The two bases are perfect squares of seventeen feet and 25 feet. The historical marker at the site was placed there by the Augusta Tilghman High School class of 1929.

On July 17, 1997, it was one of sixty-one different monuments to the Civil War in Kentucky placed on the National Register of Historic Places, as part of the Civil War Monuments of Kentucky Multiple Property Submission. One other monument on the list, the Confederate Monument in Paducah, is nearby. Tilghman's home in Paducah is also on the National Register, and currently serves as a museum.
