= J. T. Riddle =

American baseball player (born 1991)

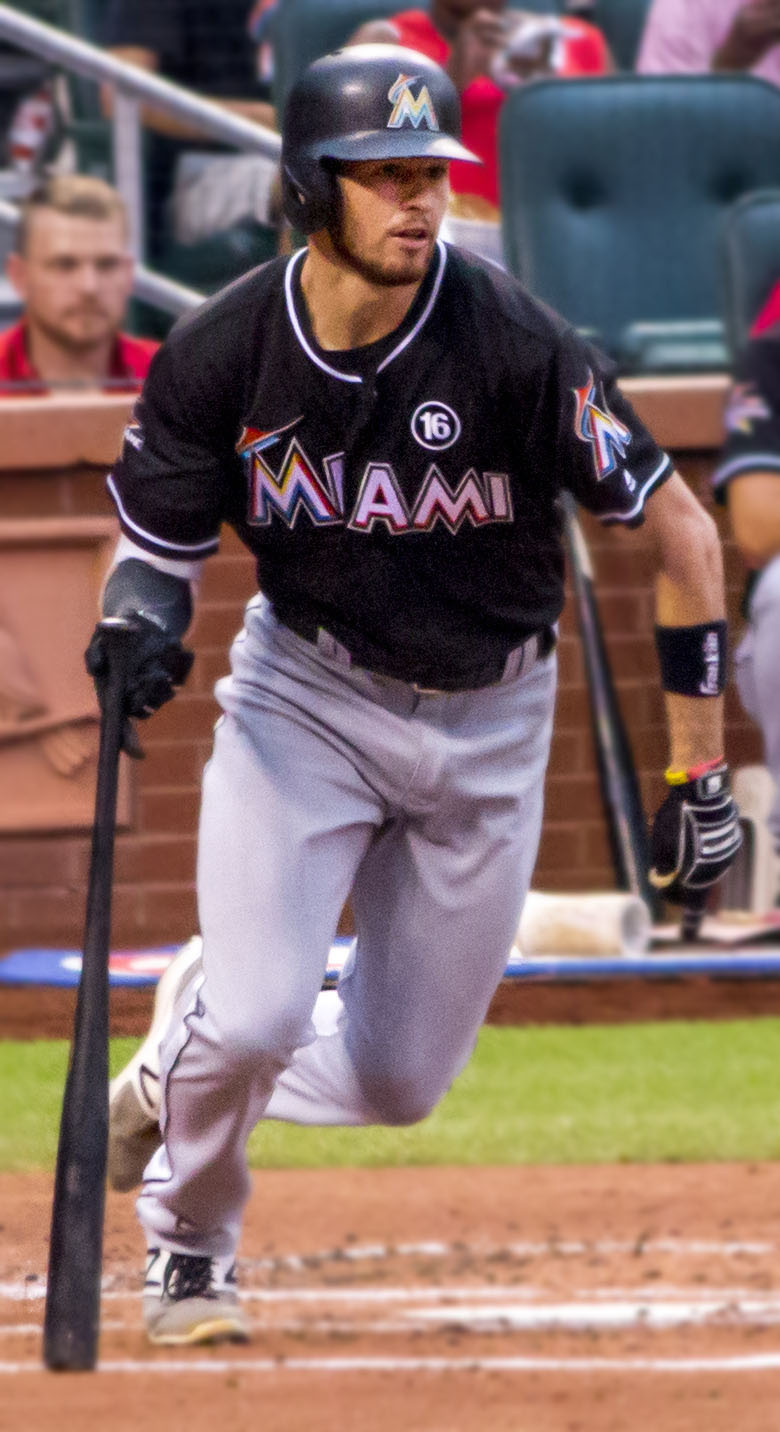
- Riddle with the Miami Marlins in 2017
- Shortstop / Outfielder
- Born: October 12, 1991 (age 34); Frankfort, Kentucky, U.S.
- Batted: Left Threw: Right

MLB debut
- April 11, 2017, for the Miami Marlins

Last MLB appearance
- April 24, 2022, for the Cincinnati Reds

MLB statistics
- Batting average: .223
- Home runs: 19
- Runs batted in: 80
- Stats at Baseball Reference

Teams
- Miami Marlins (2017–2019); Pittsburgh Pirates (2020); Minnesota Twins (2021); Cincinnati Reds (2022)

Joshua Travis Riddle (born October 12, 1991) is an American former professional baseball shortstop and outfielder. He played in Major League Baseball (MLB) for the Miami Marlins, Pittsburgh Pirates, Minnesota Twins, and Cincinnati Reds. Prior to playing professionally, Riddle attended the University of Kentucky, where he played college baseball for the Wildcats.

== Amateur career ==
Riddle attended Western Hills High School in Frankfort, Kentucky. As a senior in 2010, he was named Mr. Kentucky Baseball after batting .514 with 7 home runs and 20 stolen bases, while pitching to an 8–0 record and 1.26 earned run average. He then enrolled at the University of Kentucky, where he played college baseball for the Kentucky Wildcats. In three seasons, he batted .283 with 9 home runs in 168 games. In 2012, he played collegiate summer baseball with the Orleans Firebirds of the Cape Cod Baseball League.

== Professional career ==
=== Miami Marlins ===
The Miami Marlins selected Riddle in the 13th round of the 2013 Major League Baseball draft. He signed with Miami and began his professional career with the Batavia Muckdogs of the Low-A New York–Penn League. He spent all of 2013 there, batting .243 with two home runs and 18 RBI in 59 games. He played for the Greensboro Grasshoppers of the Single-A South Atlantic League in 2014 and batted .280 with nine home runs and 60 RBIs in 103 games. Riddle began the 2015 season with the Jupiter Hammerheads of the High-A Florida State League, and after batting .270/.311/.314 in 45 games, received a midseason promotion to the Jacksonville Suns of the Double-A Southern League. In 44 games for Jacksonville he posted a .289 batting average with five home runs and 20 RBI. After the 2015 season, the Marlins assigned Riddle to the Mesa Solar Sox of the Arizona Fall League.

In 2016, the Marlins invited Riddle to spring training. He spent the season with both Jacksonville and the New Orleans Baby Cakes of the Triple-A Pacific Coast League, compiling a combined .276 batting average with four home runs and 53 RBIs in 116 games between both teams. On November 19, the Marlins added Riddle to their 40-man roster to protect him from the Rule 5 draft.

Riddle began 2017 with New Orleans, and was promoted to the major leagues on April 10. He recorded his first major league hit on April 12, on a checked swing infield single against the Atlanta Braves. On April 16, he hit a walk-off home run against the New York Mets, his first major league home run.

Following the trade of Adeiny Hechavarria in June, Riddle became the Marlins' primary shortstop. In mid-July Riddle tore a shoulder labrum, requiring season-ending surgery in August. He had batted .250 with a .282 on-base percentage, a .355 slugging percentage, three home runs, and 31 runs batted in in 70 games prior to his injury.

Riddle began 2018 on the disabled list and was optioned to New Orleans after he was activated. He was recalled to Miami on May 26. Riddle was non-tendered on December 2, 2019, and became a free agent.

=== Pittsburgh Pirates ===
On January 31, 2020, Riddle signed with the Pittsburgh Pirates. With the Pirates in 2020, Riddle batted .149 with one home run and 1 RBI in 23 games. Riddle was designated for assignment after the season on October 1, 2020, following the acquisition of Sean Poppen. Riddle was outrighted on October 5, but rejected the assignment in favor of free agency.

=== Minnesota Twins ===
On January 7, 2021, Riddle signed a minor league contract with the Minnesota Twins. On April 14, Riddle was selected to the active roster. On April 29, Riddle was designated for assignment after notching 2 hits in 6 at-bats. On May 3, he was outrighted to the Triple-A St. Paul Saints. In 91 games for St. Paul, he slashed .202/.269/.322 with 7 home runs and 40 RBI. On October 13, Riddle elected free agency.

=== Cincinnati Reds ===
On March 15, 2022, Riddle signed a minor league contract with the Cincinnati Reds. On April 19, Riddle has his contract selected to the major league roster. He went 1-for-4 with the Reds. He was designated for assignment on April 24. He cleared waivers and was sent outright to the Triple-A Louisville Bats on April 28.

=== New York Mets ===
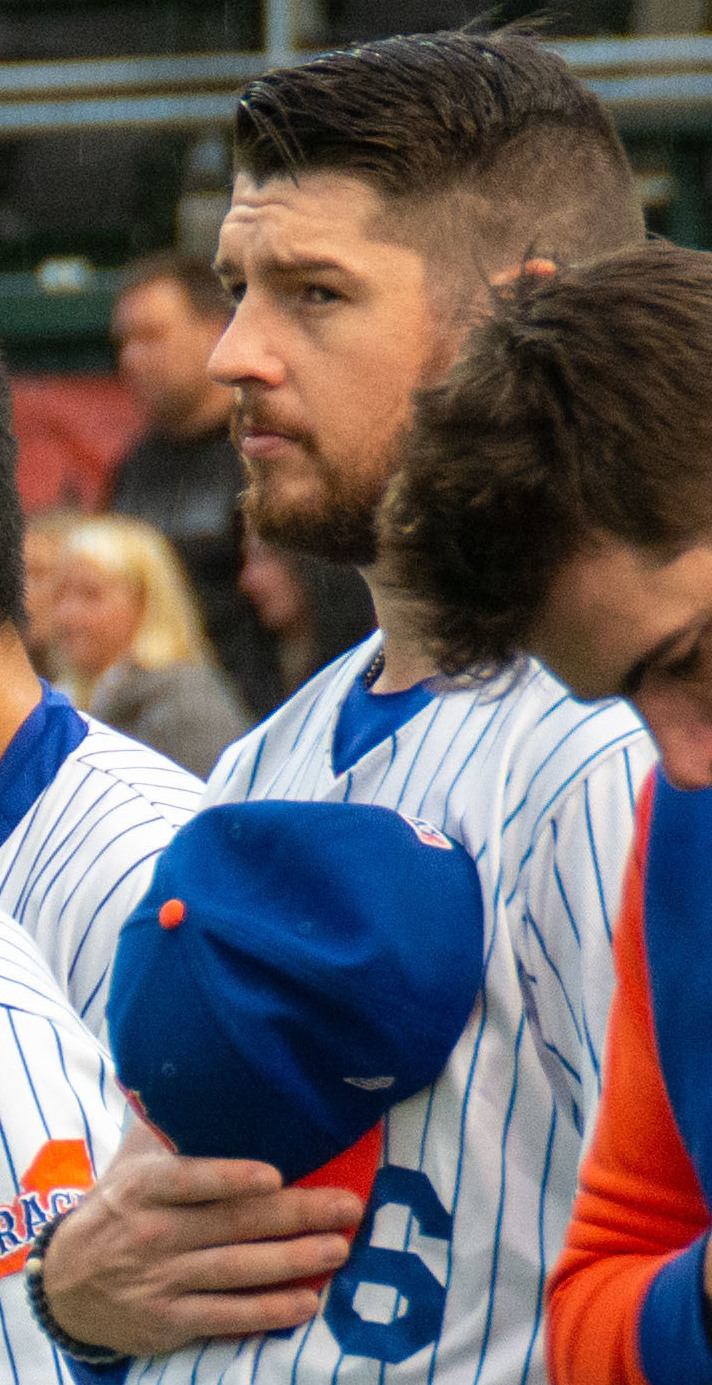
Riddle with the Syracuse Mets in 2022

On May 29, 2022, Riddle was traded to the New York Mets for cash considerations. He was assigned to the Triple-A Syracuse Mets as a depth option. In 61 appearances for Syracuse, he batted .254/.276/.436 with eight home runs and 30 RBI. On October 13, Riddle elected to become a free agent.

=== Lexington Legends ===
On June 28, 2024, Riddle signed with the Lexington Legends of the Atlantic League of Professional Baseball. In 50 games for Lexington, he slashed .220/.295/.376 with seven home runs, 32 RBI, and five stolen bases. Riddle retired from professional baseball on December 4 to coach the Franklin County High School baseball team.

On June 6, 2025, Riddle came out of retirement and re-signed with the Legends. In 30 appearances for the club, he batted .252/.315/.339 with two home runs, 14 RBI, and one stolen base. On September 18, it was announced that Riddle would again be retiring from professional baseball.

== Personal life ==
Riddle has a younger sister. In high school, he also played basketball.
