= Frankfort, Kentucky =

Capital of Kentucky, United States

Frankfort
- State capital
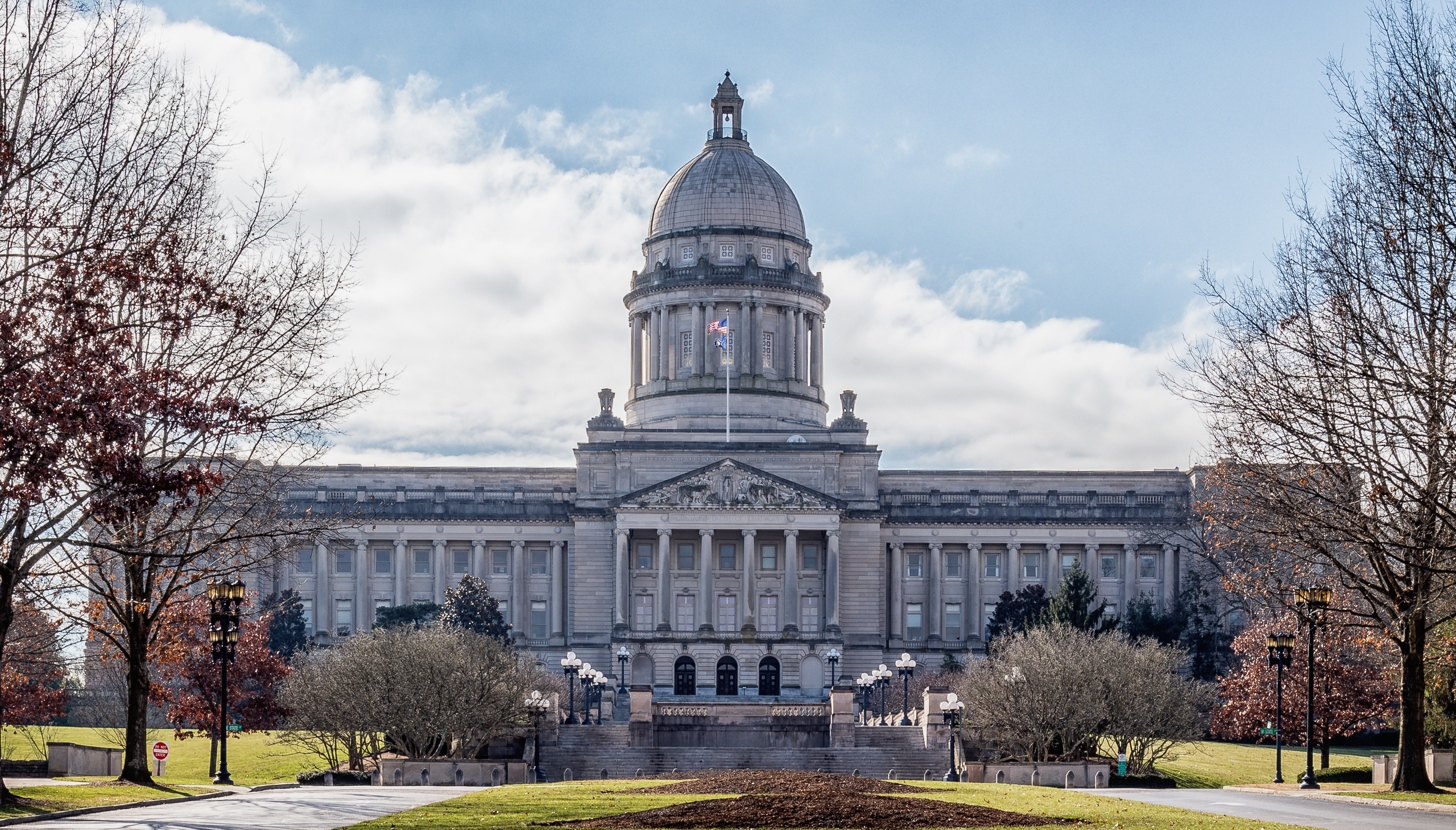
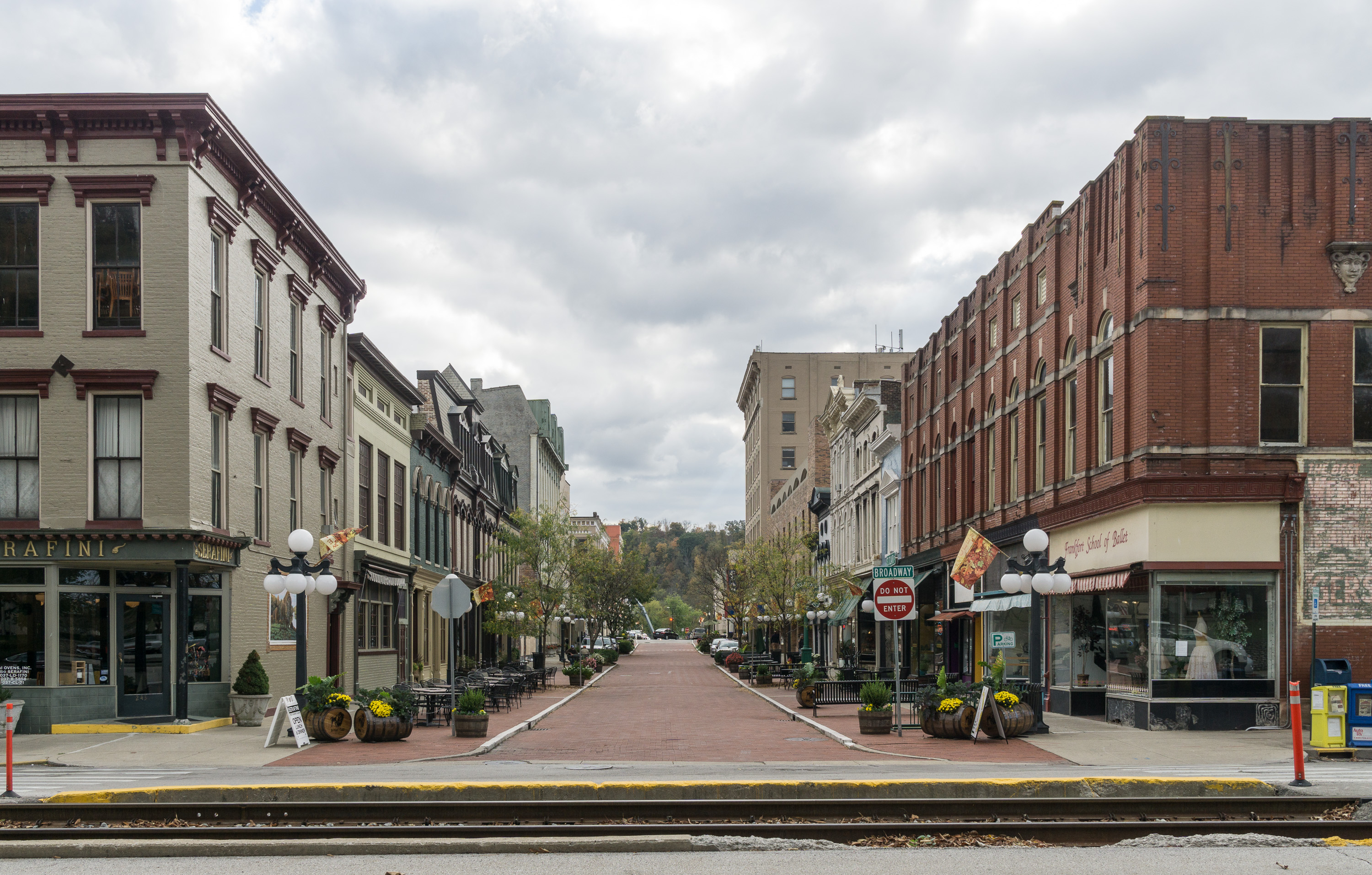
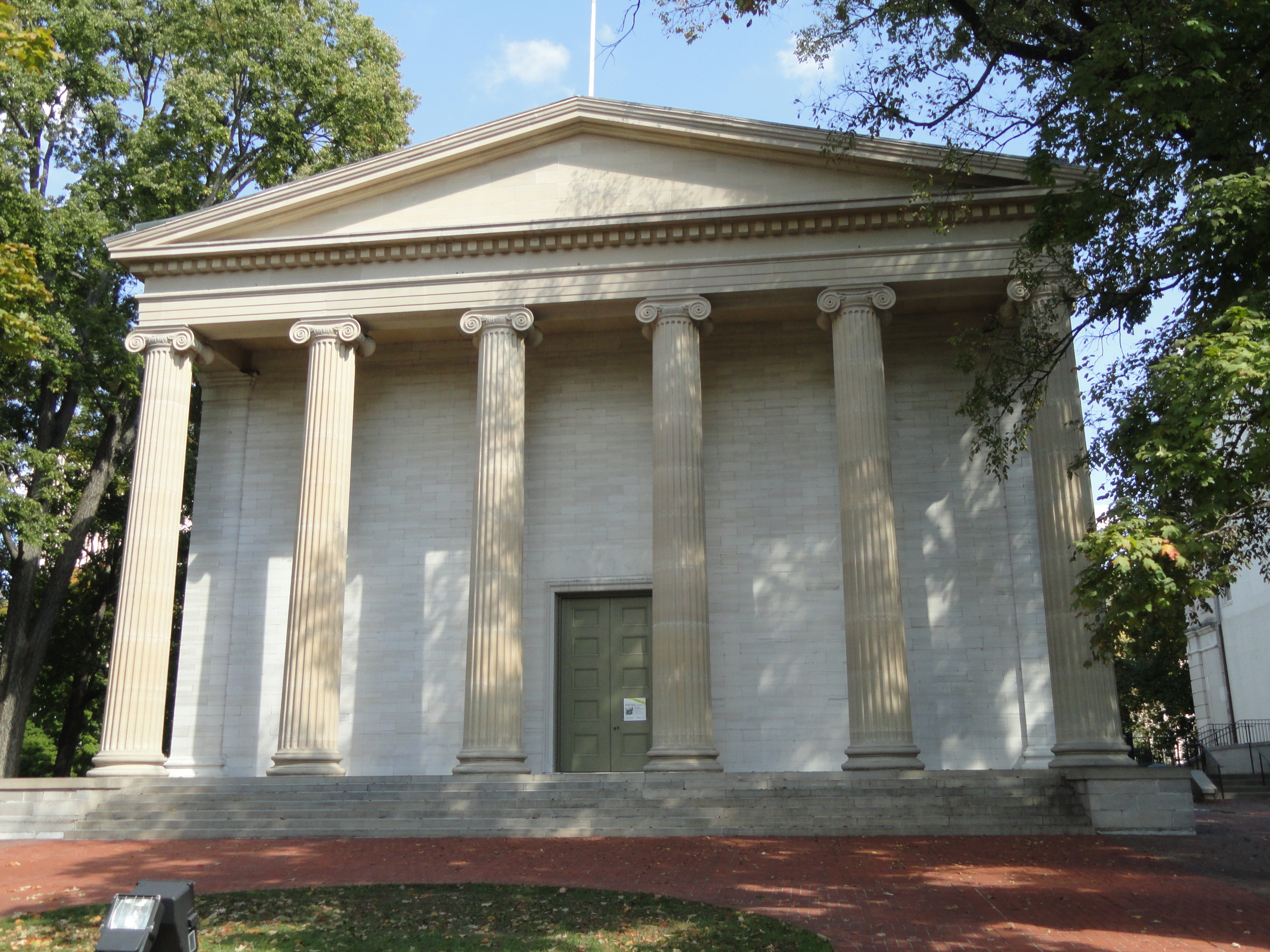
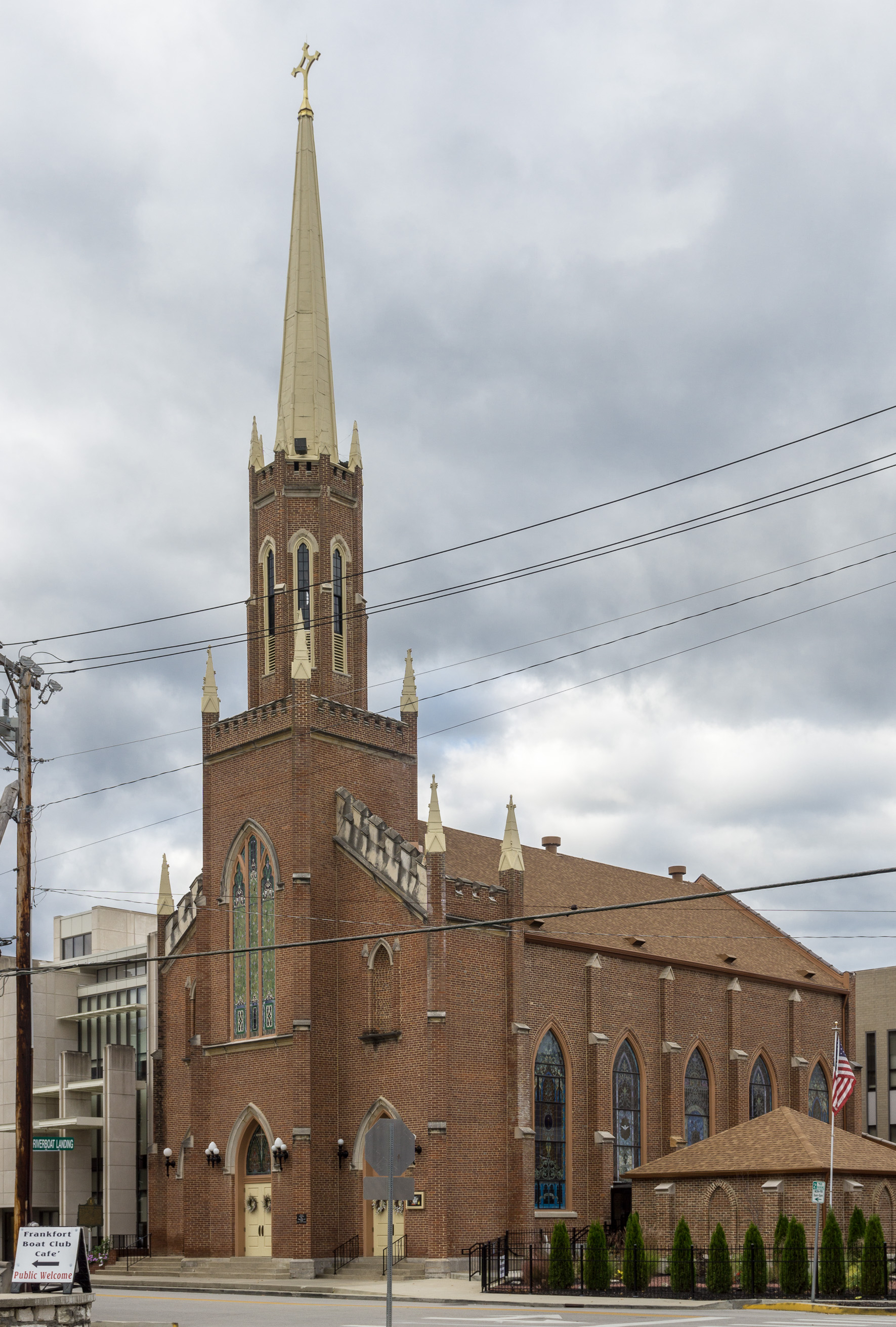
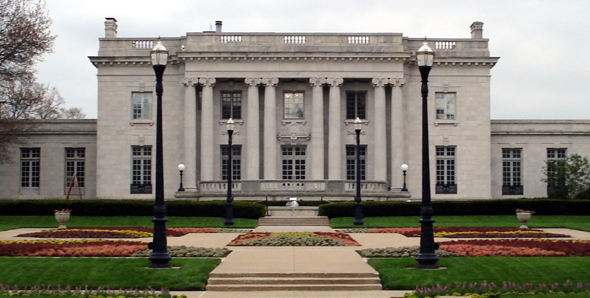
- Kentucky State Capitol Historic District, downtown Old Statehouse Church of the Good Shepherd Kentucky Governor's; Mansion

- Flag Seal Logo
- Interactive map of Frankfort
- Location within Kentucky Location within the United States
- Coordinates: 38°12′N 84°52′W
- Country: United States
- State: Kentucky
- County: Franklin
- Established: 1786
- Incorporated: February 28, 1835

Government
  - Type: Commission/Manager
  - Mayor: Layne Wilkerson

Area
  - Total: 15.07 sq mi (39.03 km^{2})
  - Land: 14.77 sq mi (38.25 km^{2})
  - Water: 0.30 sq mi (0.78 km^{2})
- Elevation: 505 ft (154 m)

Population (2020)
  - Total: 28,602
  - Estimate (2022): 28,391
  - Density: 1,937/sq mi (747.8/km^{2})
- Time zone: UTC−05:00 (EST)
  - Summer (DST): UTC−04:00 (EDT)
- ZIP Code: 40601-40604, 40618-40622
- Area code: 502
- FIPS code: 21-28900
- GNIS feature ID: 517517
- Website: frankfort.ky.gov

Frankfort is the capital city of the U.S. state of Kentucky. It is a home rule-class city and the seat of Franklin County. As of the 2020 census, the population was 28,602, making it the 13th-largest city in Kentucky and 4th-smallest U.S. state capital by population. Located along the Kentucky River in the Upland South, Frankfort is the principal city of the Frankfort, Kentucky micropolitan area, which includes all of Franklin and Anderson counties.

Before Frankfort was founded, the site was a ford across the Kentucky River, along one of the great buffalo trails used as highways in colonial America. English explorers first visited the area in the 1750s. The site evidently received its name after an incident in 1780, when pioneer Stephen Frank was killed in a skirmish with Native Americans; the crossing was named "Frank's Ford" in his memory. In 1786, the Virginia legislature designated 100 acres (40 hectares) as the town of Frankfort and, after Kentucky became a state in 1792, it was chosen as capital.

The city is located in the inner Bluegrass region of Kentucky. The Kentucky River flows through the city, making a turn as it passes through the center of town; the Downtown and South Frankfort districts are opposite one another on each side of the river. The suburban areas on either side of the river valley are known as East and West Frankfort. Frankfort has four distinct seasons; winter is normally cool with some snowfall, while summers are hot and humid.

Because of the city's location on the Kentucky River, it has flooded many times, with the two highest recorded floods occurring in 1937 and 1978. The North Frankfort levee, finished in 1969, and the South Frankfort floodwall, built in the 1990s, were constructed for flood protection. Five bridges cross the river in downtown Frankfort, including the St. Clair Street bridge and Capitol Avenue bridge. Notable locations include the Kentucky State Capitol building, the Capital City Museum, and Fort Hill, a promontory with a view of downtown.

As of 2016, the city's largest industry was public administration with 28% of the workforce. Manufacturing totaled over 12% of the workforce. Frankfort is adjacent to Interstate 64, and Interstate 75 is nearby; general aviation access is via the Capital City Airport, and commercial air travel is available through Blue Grass Airport in Lexington.

== History ==
=== 18th and 19th centuries ===
The town of Frankfort likely received its name from an event that took place in the 1780s. Native Americans attacked a group of early European colonists from Bryan Station, who were on their way to make salt at Mann's Lick in Jefferson County. Pioneer Stephen Frank was killed at the Kentucky River and the settlers thereafter called the crossing "Frank's Ford". This name was later elided to Frankfort.

In 1786, James Wilkinson purchased a 260-acre (110-hectare) tract of land on the north side of the Kentucky River, which developed as downtown Frankfort. He was an early promoter of Frankfort as the state capital. Wilkinson felt Frankfort would be a center of transportation using the Kentucky River to ship farm produce to the Ohio River and then to the Mississippi and on to New Orleans.

After Kentucky became the 15th state in 1792, five commissioners from various counties were appointed, on June 20, 1792, to choose a location for the capital. They were John Allen and John Edwards (both from Bourbon County), Henry Lee (from Mason), Thomas Kennedy (from Madison), and Robert Todd (from Fayette). A number of communities competed for this honor, but Frankfort won. According to early histories, the offer of Andrew Holmes' log house as capitol for seven years, a number of town lots, £50 worth of locks and hinges, 10 boxes of glass, 1,500 pounds (680 kg) of nails, and $3,000 in gold helped the decision go to Frankfort.

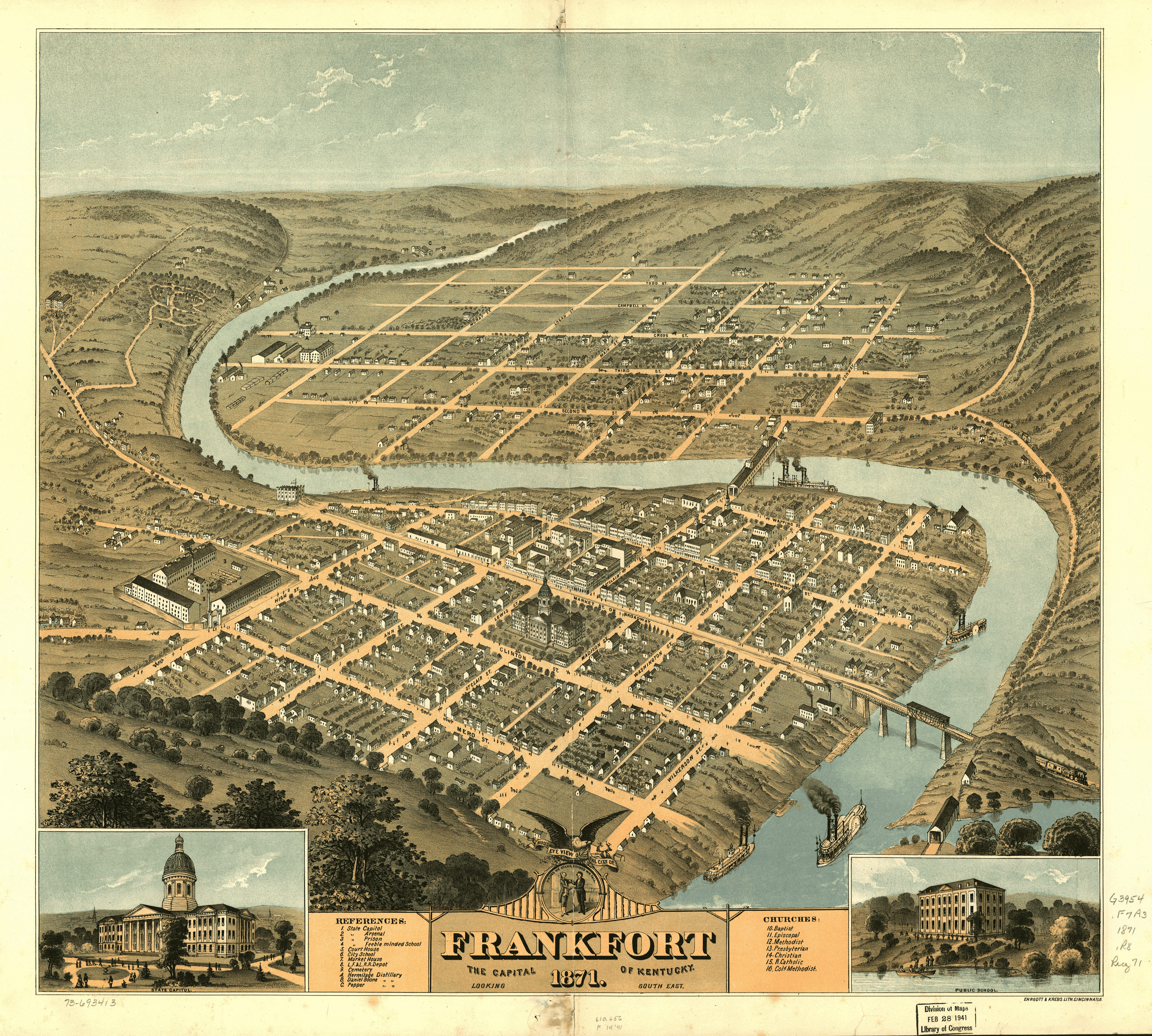
Downtown Frankfort is seen in the foreground, while South Frankfort lies across the river in the background. Fort Hill is in the lower left-hand corner (1871).

Frankfort had a United States post office by 1794, with Daniel Weisiger as postmaster. On October 1, 1794, Weisiger sent the first quarterly account to Washington.

John Brown, a Virginia lawyer and statesman, built a home now called Liberty Hall in Frankfort in 1796. Before Kentucky statehood, he represented Virginia in the Continental Congress (1777−78) and the U.S. Congress (1789−91). While in Congress, he introduced the bill granting statehood to Kentucky. After statehood, he was elected by the state legislature as one of the state's U.S. Senators.

In 1796, the Kentucky General Assembly appropriated funds to provide a house to accommodate the governor; it was completed two years later. The Old Governor's Mansion is claimed to be the oldest official executive residence still in use in the United States. In 1829, Gideon Shryock designed the Old Capitol, Kentucky's third, in Greek Revival style. It served Kentucky as its capitol from 1830 to 1910. The separate settlement known as South Frankfort was annexed by the city on January 3, 1850.

The Argus of Western America was published in Frankfort from 1808 until 1830.

During the American Civil War, the Union Army built fortifications overlooking Frankfort on what is now called Fort Hill. The Confederate Army also occupied Frankfort for a short time, starting on September 3, 1862, the only such time that Confederate forces took control of a Union capitol.

The Clinton Street High School, a segregated public school for African American students in Frankfort operated from either 1882 or 1884 until 1928.

On February 3, 1900, William Goebel was assassinated in Frankfort while walking to the capitol on the way to the Kentucky Legislature. Former Secretary of State Caleb Powers and several others were later found guilty of a conspiracy to murder Goebel; however, all were later pardoned.

=== 20th century ===
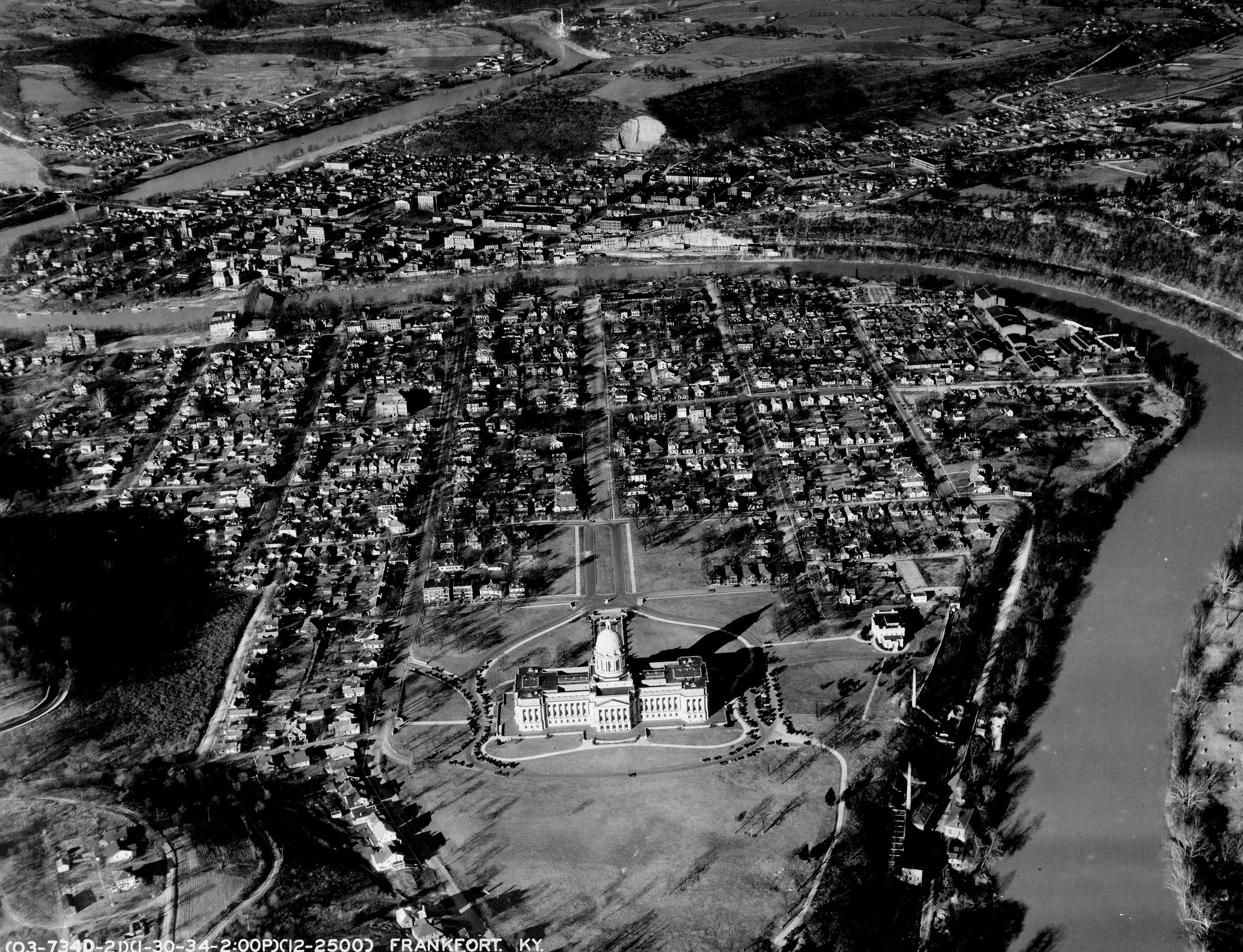
View of Frankfort in 1934, Kentucky State Capitol in the foreground

The Mayo–Underwood School, the successor to the Clinton Street High School, was a public school for African American students in Frankfort and operated from 1929 until 1964. The school was torn down as part of an urban renewal plan, and to make way for the Capital Plaza.

The Capital Plaza comprised the Capital Plaza Office Tower, the tallest building in the city, the Capital Plaza Hotel (formerly the Holiday Inn, Frankfort), and the Fountain Place Shoppes. The Capital Plaza Office Tower opened in 1972 and became a visual landmark for the center of the city. By the early 2000s, maintenance of the concrete structures had been neglected and the plaza had fallen into disrepair, with sections of the plaza closed to pedestrian activity out of concerns for safety. In 2018 the Capital Plaza was demolished and a new state office building was constructed to take its place. The new building was named The Mayo-Underwood State Office Building to honor the namesake school that was razed for the sake of the original Capital Plaza.

Frankfort grew considerably with state government in the 1960s. A modern addition to the State Office Building was completed in 1967. The original building was completed in the 1930s on the location of the former Kentucky State Penitentiary. Some of the stone from the old prison was used for the walls surrounding the office building.

=== 21st century ===
Although there was some rapid economic and population growth in the 1960s, both tapered off in the 1980s and have remained fairly stable since that time.

In August 2008, state government officials recommended demolition of the Capital Plaza Office Tower and redevelopment of the area over a period of years. Ten years later, the demolition of the office tower was completed on Sunday, March 11, 2018, and was televised by WKYT-TV on WKYT-DT2, as well as streamed live on Facebook. Demolition of the nearby convention center, which opened in 1972 and has hosted sporting events, concerts, and other local events, was completed in spring 2018. State officials replaced the outdated office tower with a smaller building called the Mayo–Underwood Building (2019), in order to create a more pedestrian-oriented scale at the complex, to encourage street activity.

Frankfort is home to three distilleries including the Buffalo Trace Distillery (Kentucky Bourbon), Castle & Key Distillery (spirits), and Three Boys Farm Distillery (bourbon and whiskey).

In 2018, thousands of teachers protested in the city in response to Senate Bill 151 having been passed on March 29, 2018. The bill was shortly overturned on December 13, 2018, by the Kentucky Supreme Court as unconstitutional, which prevented the bill from going into effect on January 1, 2019.

== Geography ==
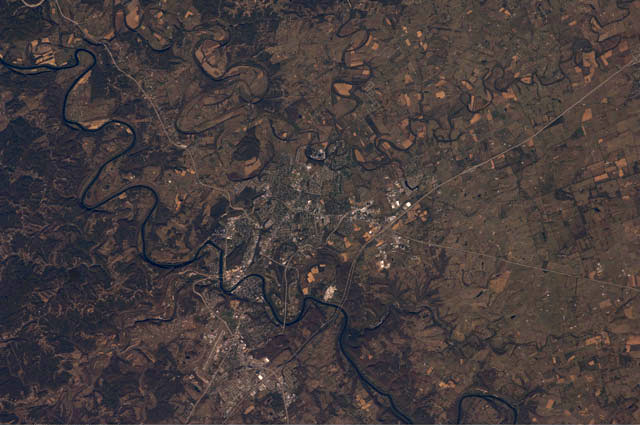
Astronaut photography of Frankfort, Kentucky, taken from the International Space Station (ISS)

Frankfort is located in the (inner) Bluegrass region of Central Kentucky. The city is bisected by the Kentucky River, which makes an s-turn as it passes through the center of town. The river valley widens at this point, which creates four distinct parts of town. The valley within the city limits contains Downtown and South Frankfort districts, which lie opposite one another on the river. A small neighborhood with its own distinct identity, Bellepoint, is located on the west bank of the river to the north of Benson Creek, opposite the river from the "downtown" district. The suburban areas on either side of the valley are respectively referred to as the "West Side" and "East Side" (or "West Frankfort" and "East Frankfort").

According to the United States Census Bureau, the city has a total area of 14.6 square miles (37.8 km^{2}), of which 14.3 square miles (37.0 km^{2}) is land and 0.3 square miles (0.78 km^{2}) is water.

Frankfort does not have a commercial airport and travelers fly into Blue Grass Airport in Lexington, the closest; Cincinnati/Northern Kentucky International Airport near Covington or Louisville Muhammad Ali International Airport in Louisville. Capital City Airport serves general and military aviation.

=== Climate ===
Frankfort has a humid subtropical climate with four distinct seasons. Winter is generally cool with some snowfall. Spring and fall are both mild and relatively warm, with ample precipitation and thunderstorm activity. Summers are hot and humid.

Climate data for Frankfort Capital City Airport, Kentucky (1991–2020 normals, extremes 1996–present)
Month	Jan	Feb	Mar	Apr	May	Jun	Jul	Aug	Sep	Oct	Nov	Dec	Year
Record high °F (°C)	73 (23)	80 (27)	84 (29)	87 (31)	91 (33)	100 (38)	103 (39)	103 (39)	99 (37)	97 (36)	84 (29)	73 (23)	103 (39)
Mean maximum °F (°C)	65.0 (18.3)	68.8 (20.4)	76.0 (24.4)	82.7 (28.2)	87.5 (30.8)	92.1 (33.4)	94.0 (34.4)	93.7 (34.3)	91.8 (33.2)	84.0 (28.9)	73.8 (23.2)	66.5 (19.2)	96.0 (35.6)
Mean daily maximum °F (°C)	43.1 (6.2)	47.6 (8.7)	57.2 (14.0)	68.5 (20.3)	76.7 (24.8)	84.7 (29.3)	87.6 (30.9)	87.1 (30.6)	81.1 (27.3)	69.5 (20.8)	56.7 (13.7)	46.8 (8.2)	67.2 (19.6)
Daily mean °F (°C)	34.1 (1.2)	37.8 (3.2)	46.2 (7.9)	56.7 (13.7)	65.5 (18.6)	73.7 (23.2)	77.2 (25.1)	76.1 (24.5)	69.2 (20.7)	57.6 (14.2)	46.1 (7.8)	38.1 (3.4)	56.5 (13.6)
Mean daily minimum °F (°C)	25.1 (−3.8)	28.0 (−2.2)	35.3 (1.8)	44.8 (7.1)	54.4 (12.4)	62.8 (17.1)	66.8 (19.3)	65.1 (18.4)	57.3 (14.1)	45.7 (7.6)	35.6 (2.0)	29.3 (−1.5)	45.8 (7.7)
Mean minimum °F (°C)	2.0 (−16.7)	8.2 (−13.2)	14.9 (−9.5)	26.7 (−2.9)	37.0 (2.8)	48.7 (9.3)	55.7 (13.2)	53.5 (11.9)	43.1 (6.2)	28.8 (−1.8)	18.9 (−7.3)	10.2 (−12.1)	0.0 (−17.8)
Record low °F (°C)	−8 (−22)	−21 (−29)	−10 (−23)	21 (−6)	28 (−2)	42 (6)	50 (10)	48 (9)	35 (2)	22 (−6)	9 (−13)	−3 (−19)	−21 (−29)
Average precipitation inches (mm)	3.27 (83)	3.40 (86)	4.72 (120)	4.55 (116)	5.10 (130)	4.34 (110)	4.69 (119)	3.15 (80)	3.35 (85)	3.64 (92)	3.36 (85)	3.77 (96)	47.34 (1,202)
Average precipitation days (≥ 0.01 in)	11.2	11.4	12.3	12.9	13.6	12.6	11.9	10.9	9.4	10.1	10.1	12.0	138.4
Source: NOAA

Climate data for Downtown Frankfort, Kentucky (1981–2010 normals, extremes 1895–present)
Month	Jan	Feb	Mar	Apr	May	Jun	Jul	Aug	Sep	Oct	Nov	Dec	Year
Record high °F (°C)	80 (27)	80 (27)	87 (31)	95 (35)	99 (37)	106 (41)	111 (44)	105 (41)	106 (41)	98 (37)	84 (29)	78 (26)	111 (44)
Mean daily maximum °F (°C)	41.5 (5.3)	46.0 (7.8)	55.8 (13.2)	66.5 (19.2)	75.2 (24.0)	83.6 (28.7)	87.3 (30.7)	86.7 (30.4)	80.4 (26.9)	69.5 (20.8)	57.3 (14.1)	45.0 (7.2)	66.2 (19.0)
Daily mean °F (°C)	31.7 (−0.2)	35.3 (1.8)	43.5 (6.4)	53.5 (11.9)	62.7 (17.1)	71.5 (21.9)	75.5 (24.2)	74.6 (23.7)	67.5 (19.7)	56.2 (13.4)	45.6 (7.6)	35.4 (1.9)	54.4 (12.4)
Mean daily minimum °F (°C)	21.9 (−5.6)	24.7 (−4.1)	31.2 (−0.4)	40.5 (4.7)	50.1 (10.1)	59.5 (15.3)	63.8 (17.7)	62.5 (16.9)	54.6 (12.6)	43.0 (6.1)	34.0 (1.1)	25.9 (−3.4)	42.6 (5.9)
Record low °F (°C)	−27 (−33)	−16 (−27)	−3 (−19)	16 (−9)	27 (−3)	36 (2)	48 (9)	41 (5)	30 (−1)	20 (−7)	−1 (−18)	−17 (−27)	−27 (−33)
Average precipitation inches (mm)	3.70 (94)	3.07 (78)	4.39 (112)	3.74 (95)	4.01 (102)	4.06 (103)	4.14 (105)	3.45 (88)	2.90 (74)	2.53 (64)	3.29 (84)	3.49 (89)	42.77 (1,086)
Average snowfall inches (cm)	3.4 (8.6)	2.8 (7.1)	1.2 (3.0)	0.0 (0.0)	0.0 (0.0)	0.0 (0.0)	0.0 (0.0)	0.0 (0.0)	0.0 (0.0)	0.0 (0.0)	0.4 (1.0)	1.6 (4.1)	9.4 (24)
Average precipitation days (≥ 0.01 in)	11	10	11	11	11	10	9	8	7	7	9	10	114
Source 1: NOAA
Source 2: Southeast Regional Climate Center (precipitation, snow 1895–2002)

== Demographics ==
Historical population
Census	Pop.	Note	%±
1800	628		—
1810	1,099		75.0%
1820	1,679		52.8%
1830	1,682		0.2%
1840	1,917		14.0%
1850	3,308		72.6%
1860	3,702		11.9%
1870	5,396		45.8%
1880	6,958		28.9%
1890	7,892		13.4%
1900	9,487		20.2%
1910	10,465		10.3%
1920	9,805		−6.3%
1930	11,626		18.6%
1940	11,492		−1.2%
1950	11,916		3.7%
1960	18,365		54.1%
1970	21,902		19.3%
1980	25,973		18.6%
1990	25,968		0.0%
2000	27,741		6.8%
2010	25,527		−8.0%
2020	28,602		12.0%
2024 (est.)	28,657		0.2%
U.S. Decennial Census 2020

=== 2020 census ===
As of the 2020 census, Frankfort had a population of 28,602 and 12,698 households. The median age was 37.9 years; 21.1% of residents were under 18 and 16.7% were 65 years of age or older. For every 100 females there were 91.9 males, and for every 100 females age 18 and over there were 88.5 males age 18 and over.

99.9% of residents lived in urban areas, while 0.1% lived in rural areas.

There were 12,698 households in Frankfort, of which 27.1% had children under the age of 18 living in them. Of all households, 31.8% were married-couple households, 22.8% were households with a male householder and no spouse or partner present, and 36.9% were households with a female householder and no spouse or partner present. About 39.1% of all households were made up of individuals and 14.3% had someone living alone who was 65 years of age or older.

There were 14,221 housing units, of which 10.7% were vacant. The homeowner vacancy rate was 2.2% and the rental vacancy rate was 8.5%.

Racial composition as of the 2020 census
Race	Number	Percent
White	21,327	74.6%
Black or African American	3,701	12.9%
American Indian and Alaska Native	105	0.4%
Asian	639	2.2%
Native Hawaiian and Other Pacific Islander	6	0.0%
Some other race	751	2.6%
Two or more races	2,073	7.2%
Hispanic or Latino (of any race)	1,499	5.2%

=== Income ===
The median income for a household in the city was $50,211, and the median income for a family was $43,949. Full-time male workers had a median income of $37,445 versus $34,613 for females. The per capita income was $29,288. About 19.8% of families and 16.3% of the population were below the poverty line, including 38.7% of those under age 18 and 7.5% of those age 65 or over.

=== Other demographics ===
Frankfort is the focal point of a micropolitan statistical area consisting of Frankfort and Franklin County as well as adjacent Lawrenceburg and Anderson County. The city is also classified in a combined statistical area with Lexington and Richmond to the east.

Frankfort's municipal population makes it the fourth least populous capital city in the United States.

== Parks and recreation ==
The city operates nine parks:

- Capitol View—playing fields, nature trails, picnic areas
- Cove Spring Park—240 acres (97 hectares), divided into three sections. The Lower Entrance features nature trails, picnic areas, and waterfalls. The Upper Entrance includes an archery range and the Sky Trail. The Middle Section consists of a wetland area with a walking trail leading to a scenic overlook with views of downtown Frankfort.
- Dolly Graham—basketball courts, picnic, community garden, playground
- East Frankfort—nature trails, dog park, picnic areas, playgrounds, volleyball court, 18-hole disc golf course.
- Juniper Hill Park—124 acres (50.2 hectares), pool, golf course, play areas, picnic areas, war memorials
- Lakeview (operated jointly with Franklin County)—ball fields, golf course, horse show arena, skatepark
- Leslie Morris Park on Fort Hill—American Civil War battlefield, wilderness forest, forts, trails
- River View—picnic area along the Kentucky River, walking trail with historic cultural sites, amphitheatre, boat ramp, farmers market
- Todd Park—trail, picnic areas, community garden

Other recreation in the area:

- Walk/Bike Frankfort - Volunteer group to improve the city for pedestrians and cyclists.
- Josephine Sculpture Park - Provides community arts education and creative experiences.
- The Folkbike Re-Cyclery - Volunteer organization that restores and repairs used bicycles, and then gives them to riders who cannot afford to buy one.

== Education ==
Kentucky State University is located within the Frankfort city limits. KSU (also known as KYSU) is a public historically black university and an 1890 land-grant institution.

Two public school districts serve the city, with three public high schools within the city limits.

Frankfort Independent School District serves the downtown neighborhoods including Downtown, South Frankfort, Bellepoint and Tanglewood. FIS operates The Early Learning Academy (a preschool), Second Street School (primary and middle grades), Frankfort High School, and Panther Transition Academy (a non-traditional high school program).

Franklin County Public Schools serves the rest of the city and county, including seven elementary schools (Bridgeport, Collins Lane, Early Learning Village, Elkhorn, Hearn, Peaks Mill, Westridge), two middle schools (Bondurant, Elkhorn), and two high schools (Franklin County High School and Western Hills High School).

There are several private schools in the area, including Capital Day School, Frankfort Christian Academy, and Good Shepherd Catholic School.

Frankfort has a lending library, Paul Sawyier Public Library, named in 1965 after the watercolor artist Paul Sawyier whose many paintings document the history of the area.

== Points of interest ==
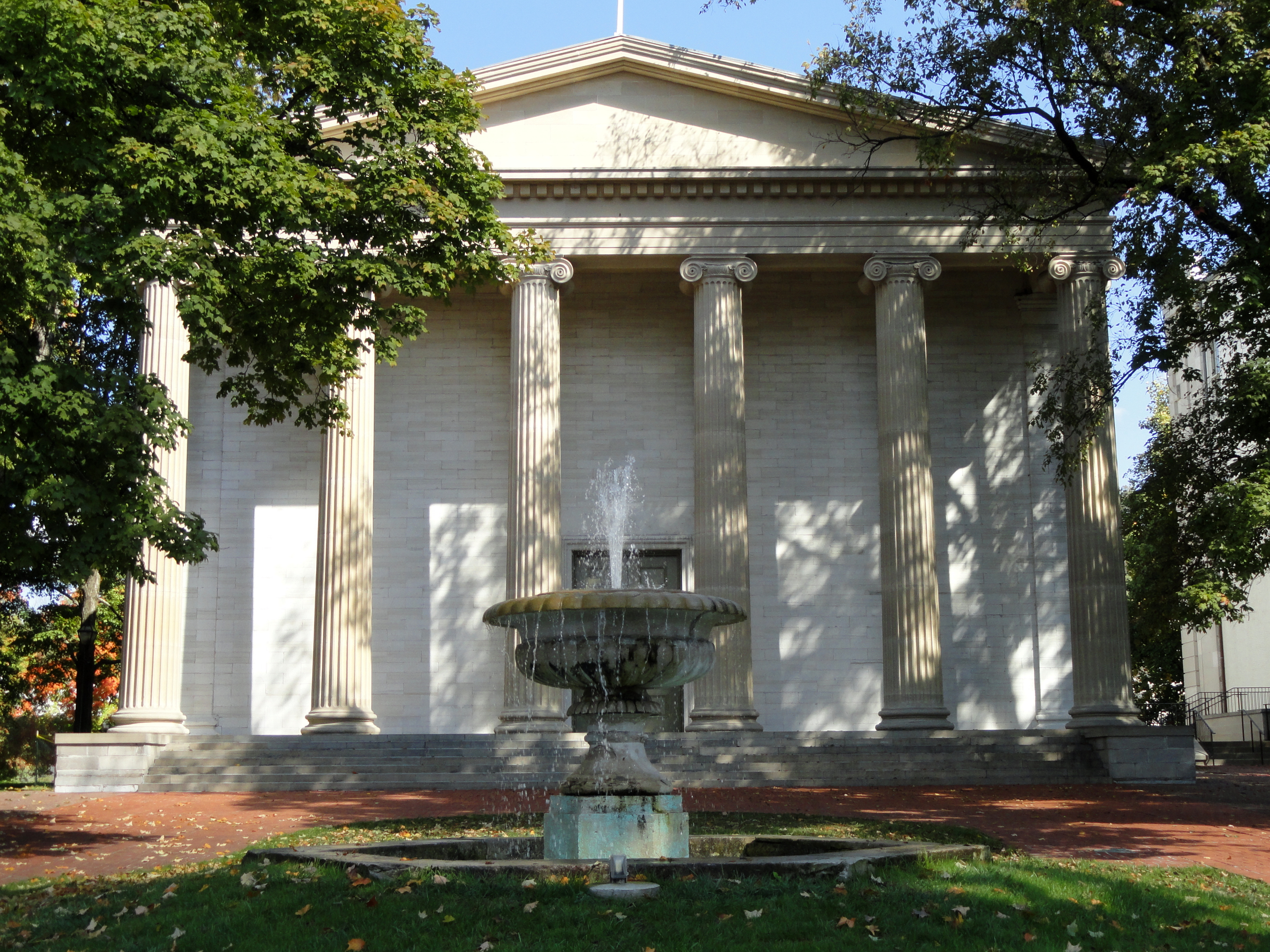
Old State Capitol building and museum

- Kentucky State Capitol building, built 1909
- Kentucky Governor's Mansion, residence of the Governor of Kentucky, built 1914
- Old State Capitol building, now a museum, built 1837
- Courthouse, built 1887
- Singing Bridge, a 125-year-old bridge that crosses the Kentucky River, built 1893
- Liberty Hall, historic house museum, built 1796
- Fort Hill, a hill overlooking downtown, American Civil War site, now a park
- Frankfort Cemetery, historic military monuments and final resting place of numerous statesmen and famous figures, established 1844
- Corner in Celebrities Historic District
- Buffalo Trace Distillery, built 1792
- Jesse R. Zeigler House (private), Kentucky's only Frank Lloyd Wright, built 1909
- Capital City Museum, a repository of the history of Frankfort and Franklin County
- Leestown, Kentucky (historical site established in 1775, currently in the city of Frankfort)

== Transportation ==
Frankfort Transit provides deviated fixed-route and demand-response transit service throughout the city.

U.S. Route 60 and U.S. Route 460 pass east–west through Frankfort. U.S. Route 127 and U.S. Route 421 pass north–south through Frankfort. Interstate 64 passes to the south of the city.

Capital City Airport, a public use airport, is one mile (1.5 kilometers) southwest of the central business district of Frankfort. The nearest airport with commercial flights is Blue Grass Airport, 22 miles (35 kilometers) southeast of Frankfort.

Frankfort Union Station was a medium scale hub passenger train station for north-central Kentucky. It served the Chesapeake & Ohio Railway, the Frankfort and Cincinnati Railroad and the Louisville and Nashville Railroad. Until the mid-1950s, Union Station served Louisville-Ashland sections of the C&O's Sportsman. Until 1971, the C&O's George Washington stopped in Frankfort.

== Notable people ==
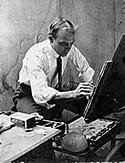
Paul Sawyier, Frankfort artist

- William Wirt Adams (1819−1888), brigadier general in the Confederate Army
- Thomas Carlin, seventh Governor of Illinois
- Will Chase, actor and singer best known for Broadway musicals and the ABC series Nashville
- Elijah Craig, Baptist preacher and early bourbon distiller, moved to Frankfort from Virginia in the 1780s
- Tim Farmer, outdoorsman and television presenter; host of Kentucky Afield
- William Goebel, 34th Governor of Kentucky
- John Marshall Harlan, U.S. Supreme Court justice
- Elizabeth Ann Hulette, professional wrestling manager
- Grover Land (1884−1958), professional baseball player
- Crit Luallen, lieutenant governor of Kentucky (2014–2015), Kentucky State Auditor (2004–2012)
- S. I. M. Major (1830–1886), Kentucky state legislator, mayor of Frankfort
- Archer Prewitt, musician and cartoonist
- J. T. Riddle, professional baseball player for the Minnesota Twins
- Wan'Dale Robinson, professional football player for the Tennessee Titans
- Green Pinckney Russell (1861/1863–1939), American school administrator, college president, and teacher
- Paul Sawyier (1865−1917), Kentucky Impressionist artist
- Arthur St. Clair, 1700s soldier and politician, after whom St. Clair Street is named
- Edmund H. Taylor Jr. (1830–1923), mayor of Frankfort, Kentucky state politician
- Landon Addison Thomas (1799−1889), state legislator
- George Graham Vest (1830−1904), U.S. Senator from Missouri, best known for popularizing the notion that a dog is a man's best friend
- James Wilkinson, who named Mero St. after his paymaster, Louisiana Governor Esteban Rodríguez Miró.
- Anne Elizabeth Wilson (1901–1946), writer, poet, editor
- George C. Wolfe (born 1954), Broadway producer, playwright, and film director
- Logan Woodside, NFL quarterback

== Sister cities ==
- Shimamoto, Osaka Prefecture, Japan

== Gallery ==
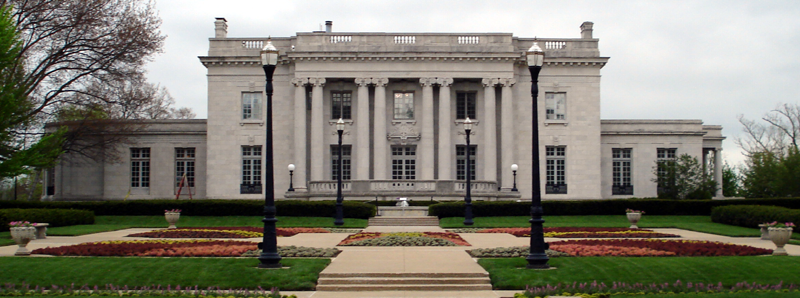
Kentucky Governor's Mansion

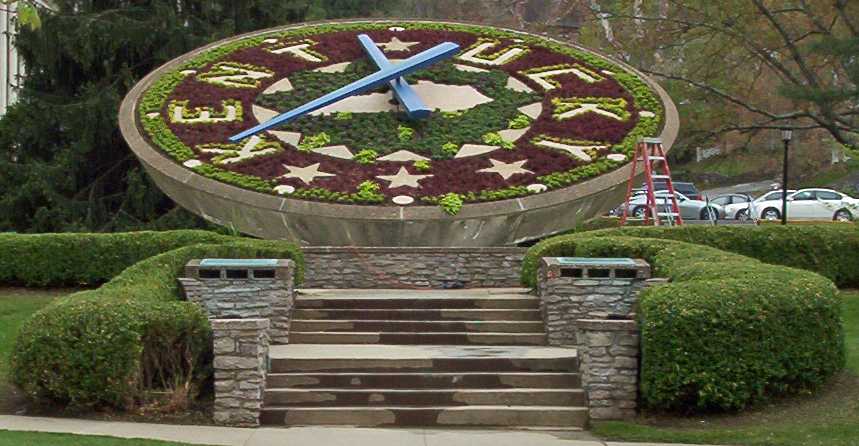
The floral clock near the Capitol building

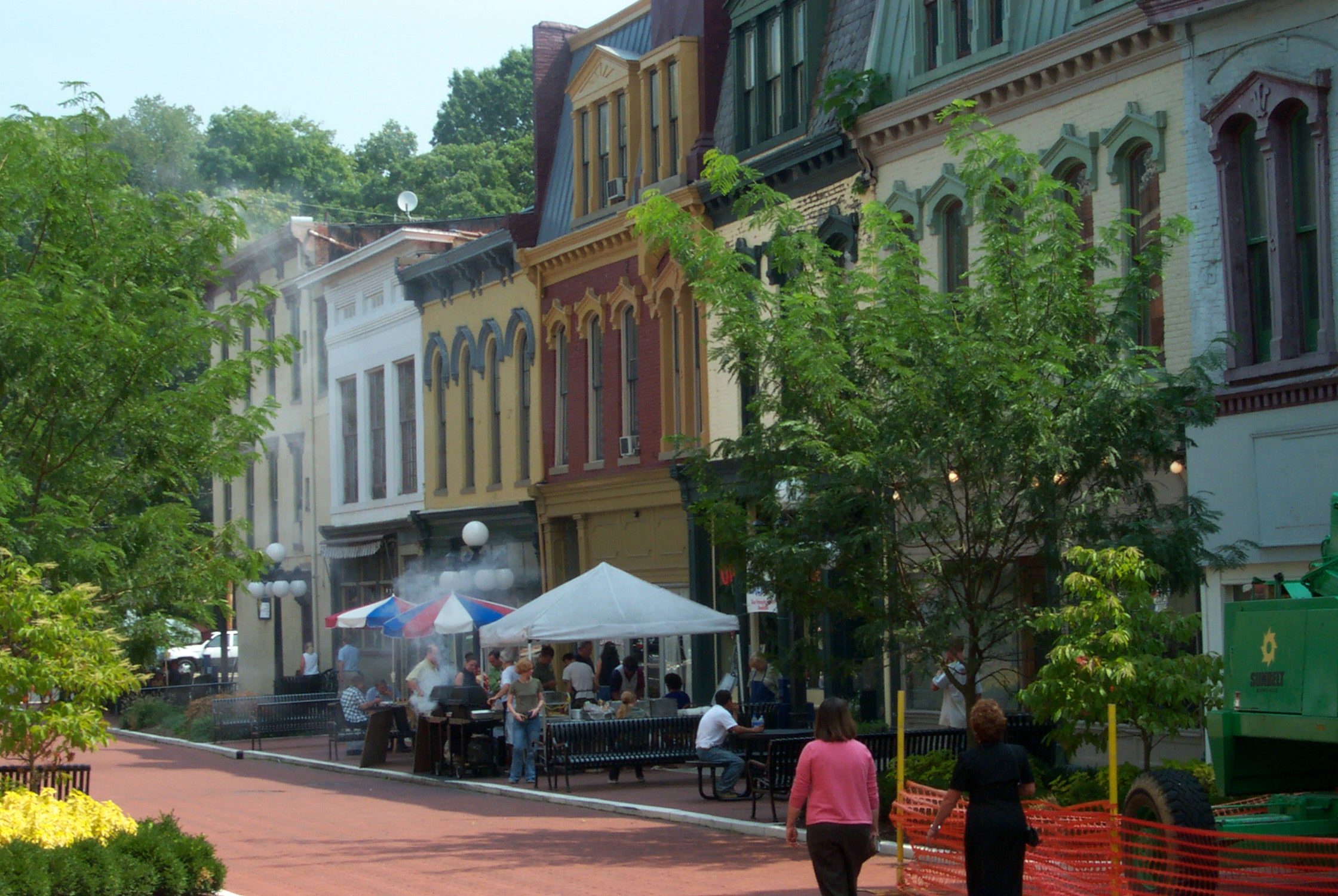
Downtown Frankfort

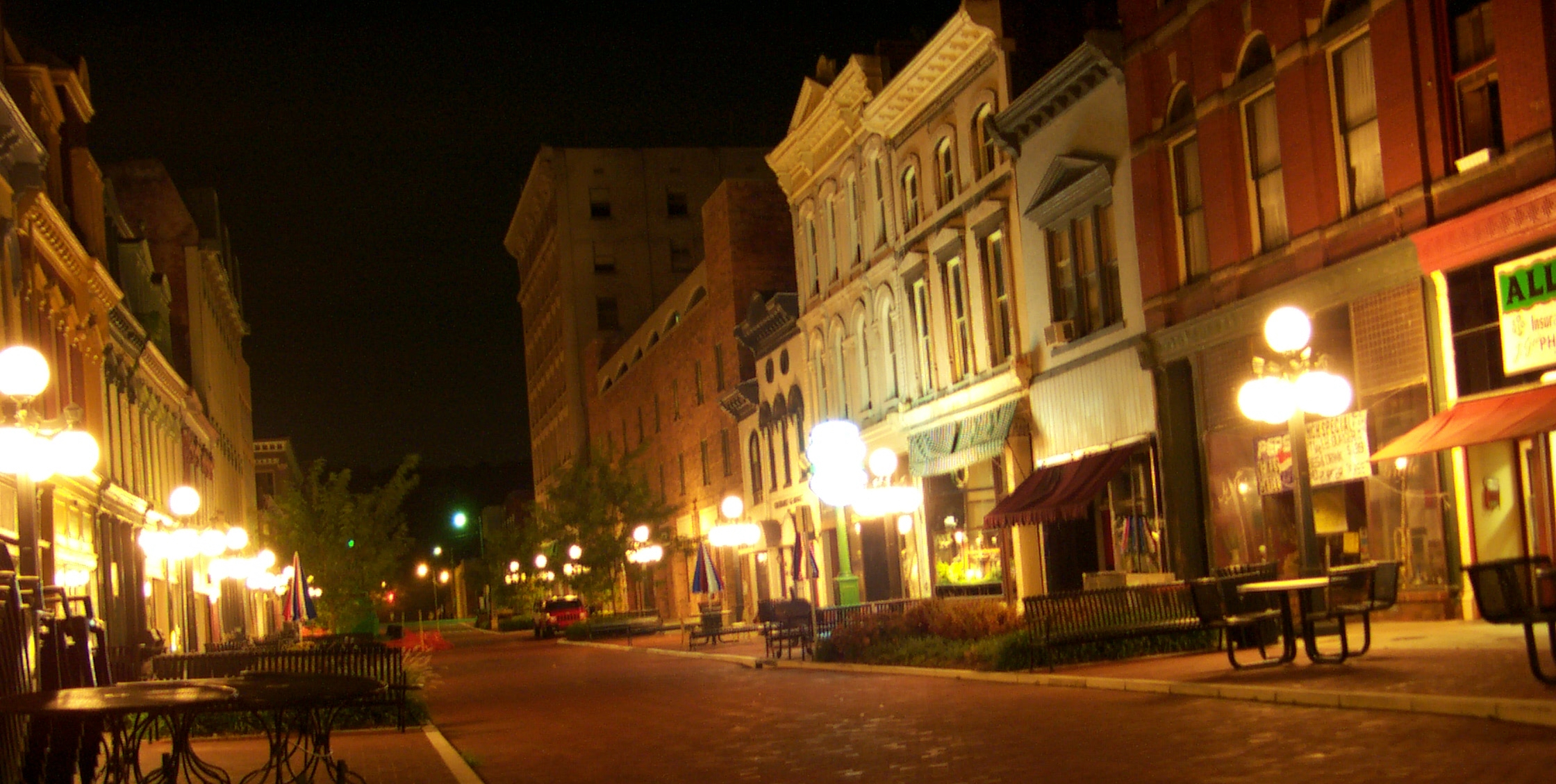
Downtown Frankfort at night

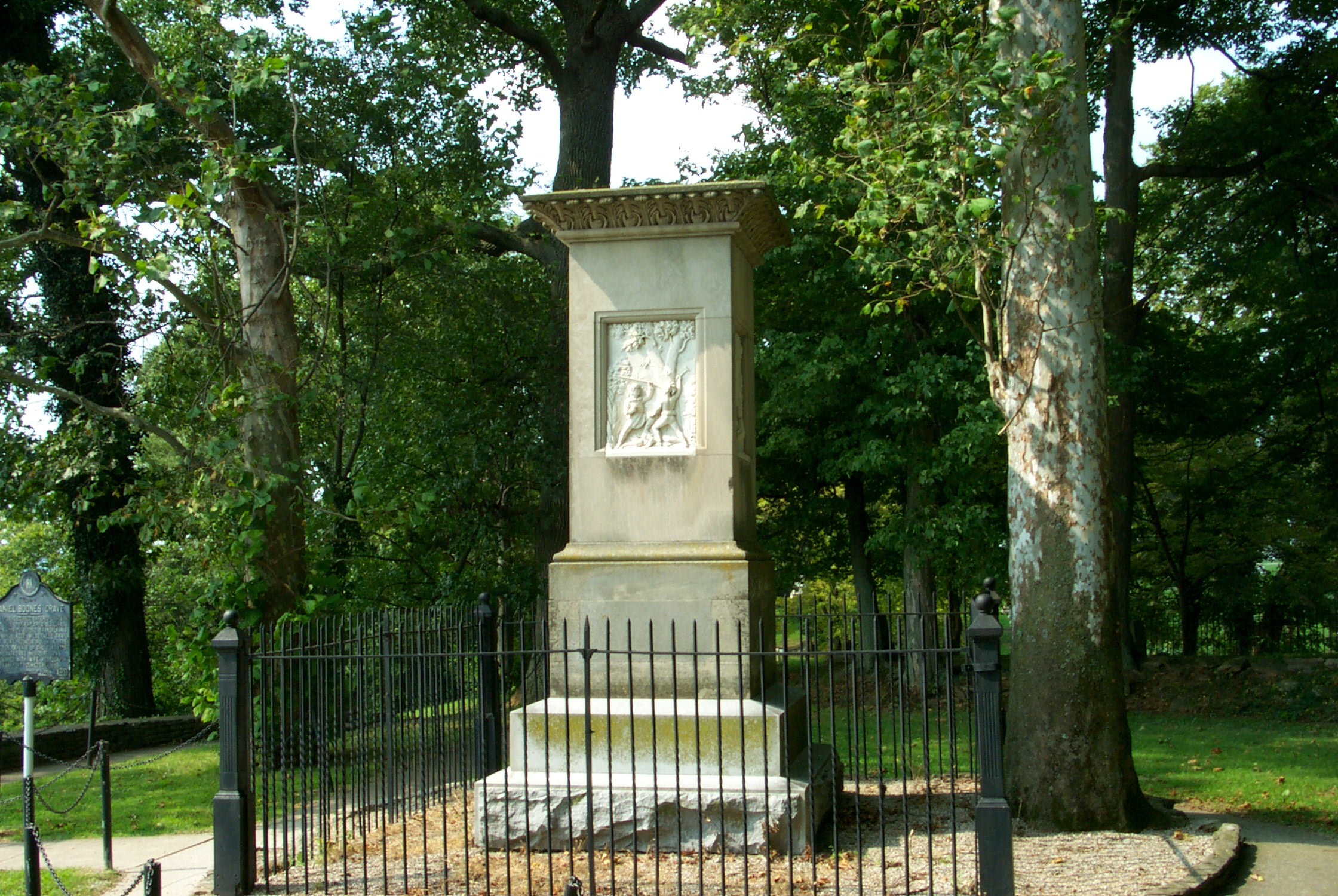
Gravesite of pioneer Daniel Boone and his wife at Frankfort Cemetery

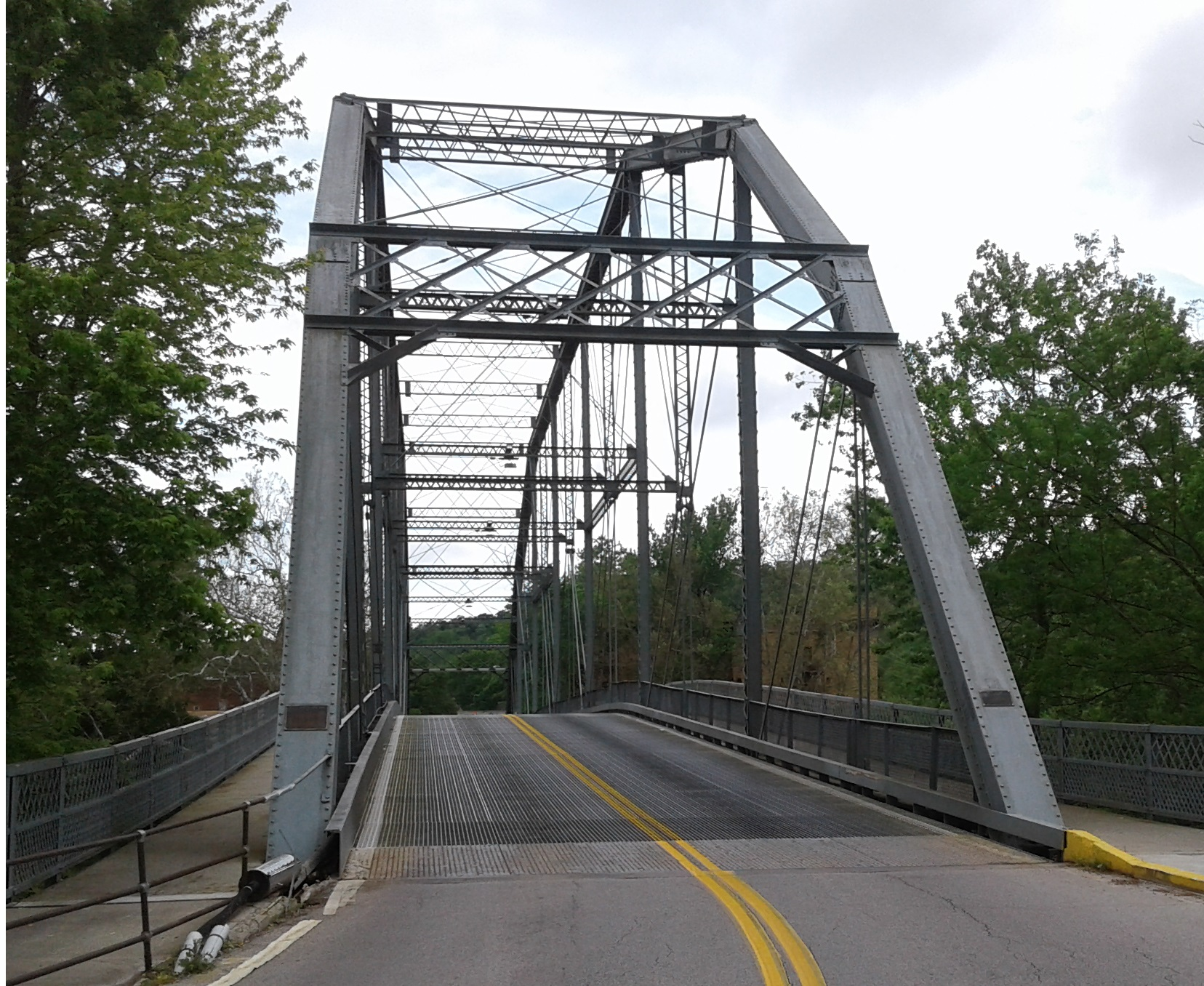
Singing Bridge

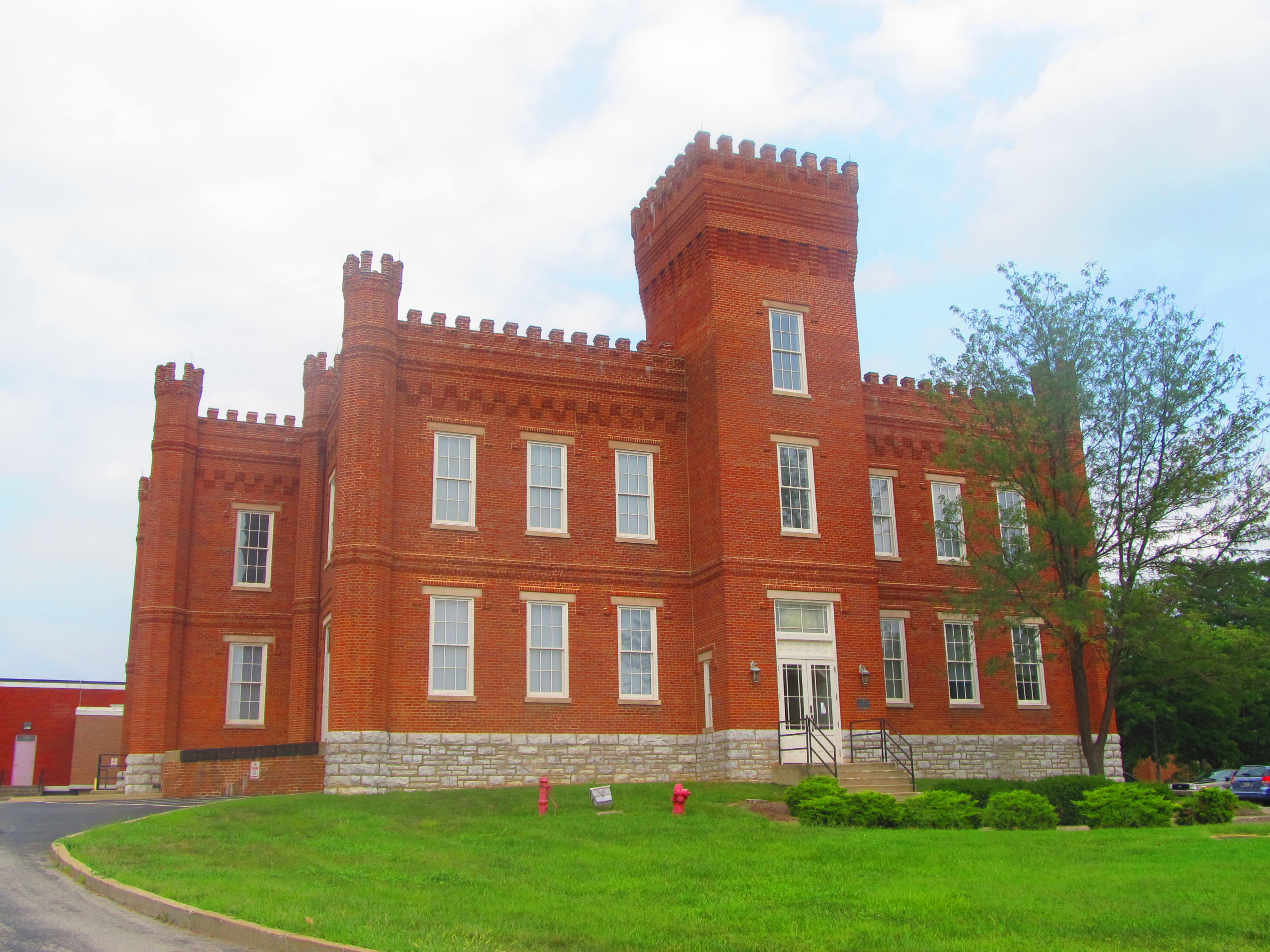
Jackson Hall of Kentucky State University

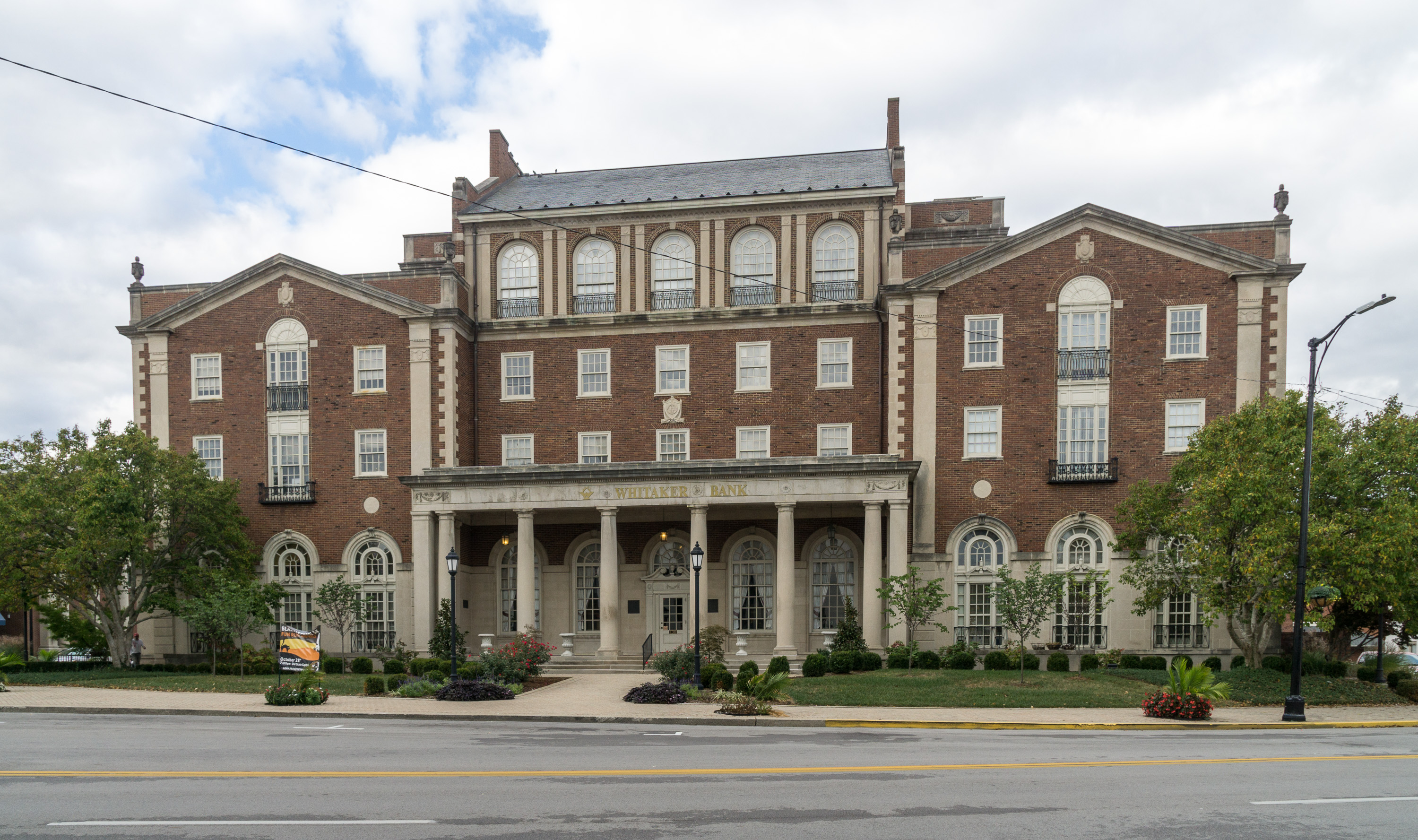
Whitaker Bank building

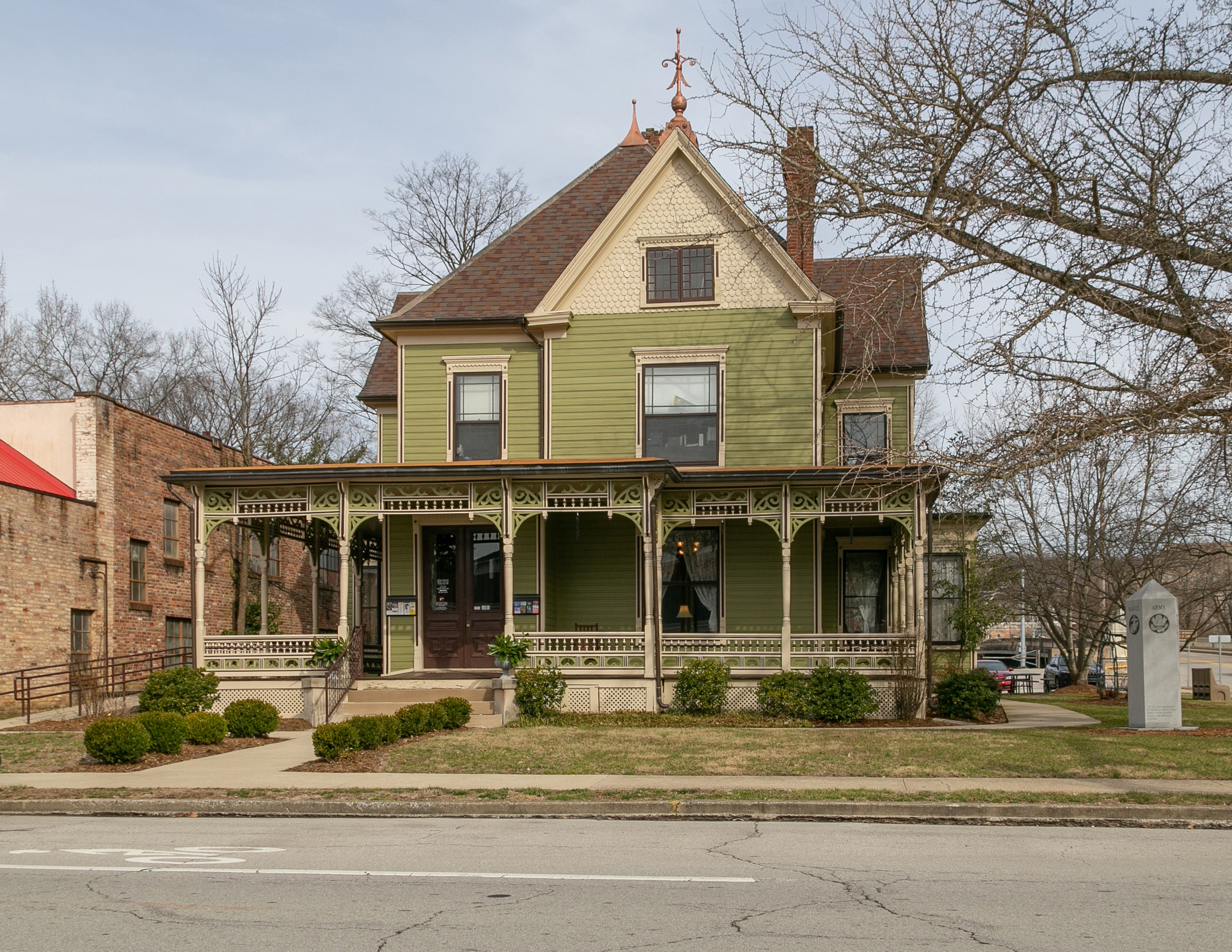
Gooch House

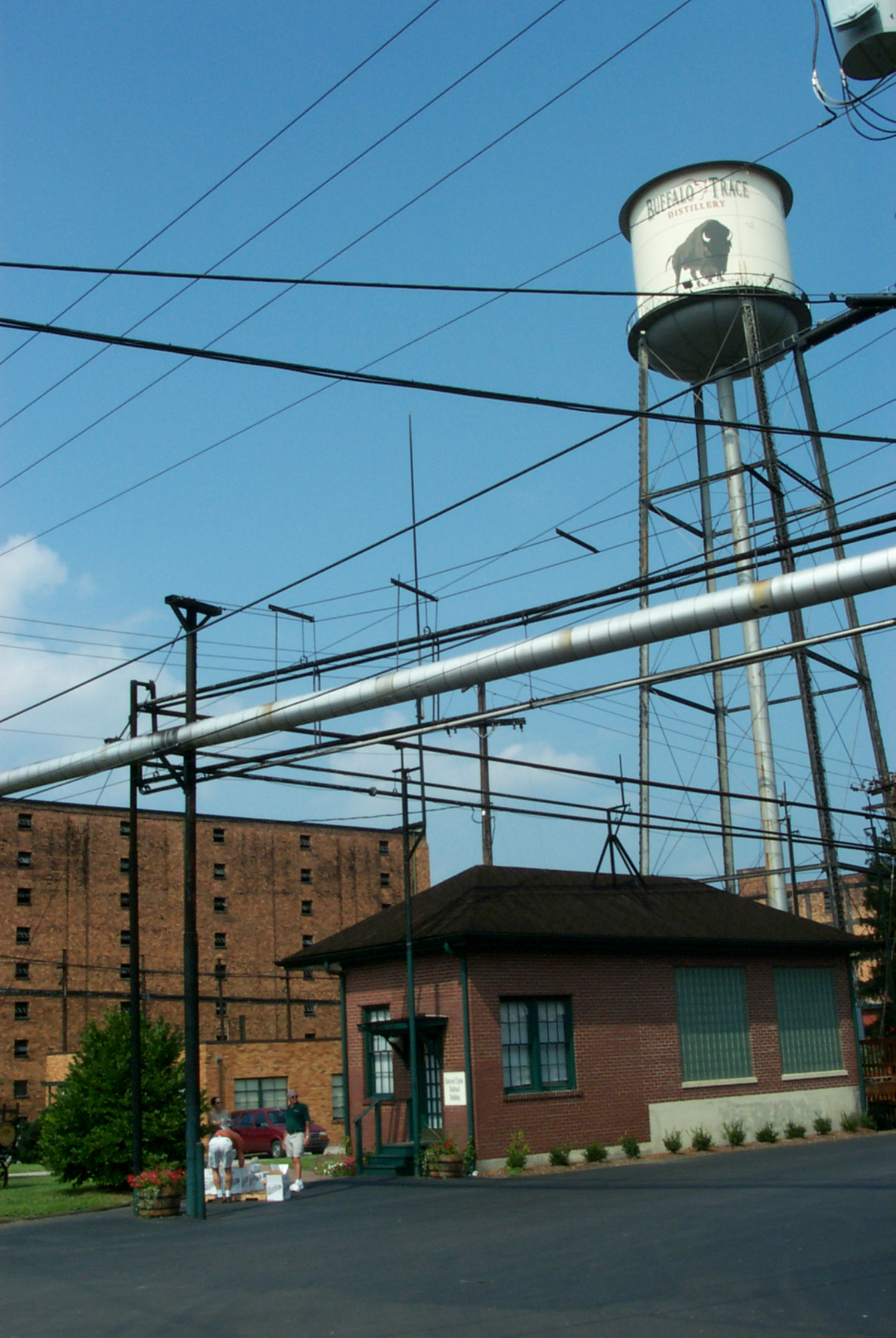
Buffalo Trace Distillery
