= Flag of Frankfort, Kentucky =

City of Frankfort, Kentucky
- Proportion: 10:19
- Adopted: 2024; 2 years ago
- Designed by: Amanda Cross

The city flag of Frankfort, Kentucky is an indigo background with a light blue wave fimbriated in white. Separating the wave is an outlined golden five-pointed star on the fly. It was unanimously adopted by the Frankfort Board of Commissioners on December 9, 2024, and was designed by Amanda Cross.

== Symbolism ==
The blue and gold stars represent the unity of historic Frankfort and modern Frankfort, as well as the new and old capital buildings from the previous flag. The S-bend represents the Kentucky River that flows through downtown, growing larger towards the hoist to symbolize Frankfort's bright future. The colors mirror the Kentucky state flag, just as the old flag did, with the intention that it will look at home flying side by side with it.

== Former flag ==
City of Frankfort, Kentucky
- Adopted: September 14, 1959; 67 years ago
- Relinquished: January 24, 2022; 4 years ago
- Designed by: Col. George M. Chinn, Ermina Jett Darnell, Eudora Lindsay South, Margaret Brown Sullivan, and Allan M. Trout.

The former flag of Frankfort, Kentucky, is a white background with a yellow disk in the center. The disk is split with an S-shaped blue line, forming a yin-yang type figure. In the top half of the disk is the old State Capitol building and in the lower half is the new State Capitol building, both outlined with blue.
