= Leestown, Kentucky =

Leestown
- Village
- Location within Kentucky Location within the United States
- Coordinates: 38°12′N 84°52′W
- Country: United States
- State: Kentucky
- Established: 1775
- Elevation: 505 ft (154 m)
- Website: City of Frankfurt website

Leestown, Kentucky was a settlement located originally in colonial Virginia, now in present-day Franklin County, Kentucky, on the east side of the Kentucky River, roughly a mile north of the area that later became Frankfort, Kentucky.

== History ==
First surveyed in 1773, Leestown was established in 1775 by Hancock Lee and Willis Lee; it was the first Anglo-American settlement on the north side of the Kentucky River. The settlement was recognized by the Virginia legislature in 1776, temporarily abandoned in 1777 due to attacks by Native Americans aligned with the British during the American Revolution, but reestablished soon after. Today, the site is within the city limits of Frankfort.

The site is marked by the Kentucky Historical Society, with the Kentucky Department of Highways (Marker Number 103).
