= Gooch House =

Historic house in Kentucky, United States

- U.S. National Register of Historic Places
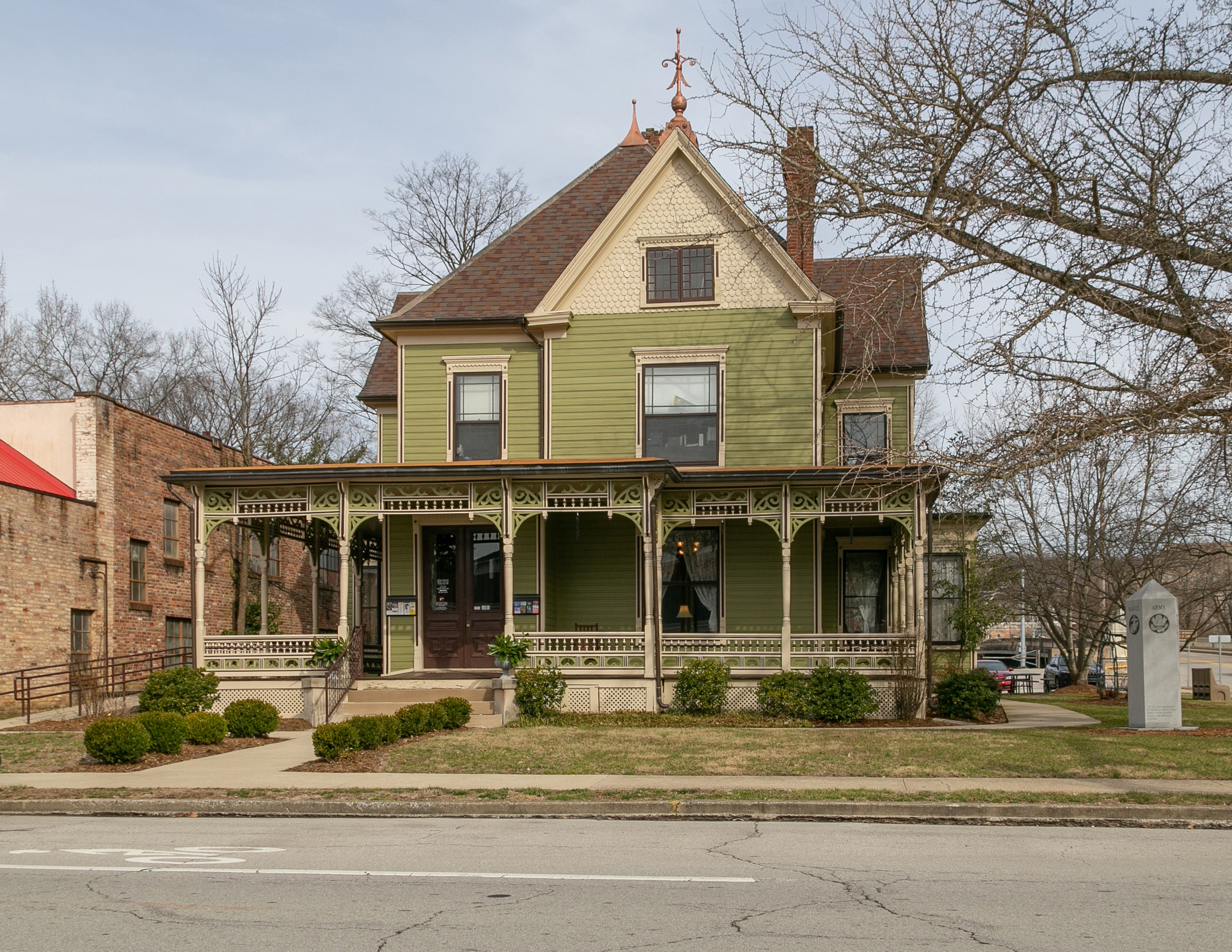

- Location within Kentucky Location within the United States
- Location: Frankfort, Kentucky
- Coordinates: 38°11′42″N 84°52′29″W
- Built: 1895
- Architectural style: Queen Anne
- NRHP reference No.: 80001528
- Added to NRHP: April 30, 1980

The Gooch House is a Queen Anne style house located in Frankfort, Kentucky. The building formerly housed the Frankfort Visitor Center and the offices of the Frankfort/Franklin County Tourist & Convention Commission, the Frankfort Area Chamber of Commerce, and the Downtown Frankfort, Inc. It was purchased in 2019 by the Kentucky Distillers Association to be used as the new headquarters for the non-profit trade group that represents the state's signature Bourbon and distilled spirits industry. The property was added to the U.S. National Register of Historic Places in 1980.
