= Paul Sawyier =

American painter (1865–1917)

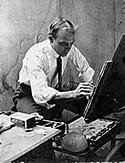
- Paul Sawyier, 1905
- Born: 23 March 1865; Madison County, Ohio, US
- Died: 8 November 1917 (aged 52); Fleischmanns, New York, US
- Resting place: Frankfort Cemetery
- Years active: circa 1881-1917

Paul Sawyier (March 23, 1865 – November 5, 1917), one of Kentucky's most renowned artists, was an American impressionist painter.

== Early life and education ==
Sawyier, the son of Dr. Nathaniel and Ellen Wingate Sawyier, was born on March 23, 1865, on his grandfather's farm near London in Madison County, Ohio. In 1870, he moved with his family to Frankfort, Kentucky, where he took his first art lessons with Elizabeth S. Hutchins of Cincinnati.

After high school Sawyier attended the McMicken School of Design (now the Art Academy of Cincinnati), studying under Frank Duveneck and Thomas Satterwhite Noble. In 1889, he furthered his art studies under William Merritt Chase at the Art Students League of New York.

== Career as artist ==
Sawyier worked mostly in watercolor and is best known for his scenes in the Frankfort, Kentucky area and New York. Sawyier is noted for his paintings of the Kentucky and Dix rivers. In 1893, Sawyier went to the Chicago's World's Columbian Exposition, where some of his works were in the State of Kentucky display. The commissions he received from his work in portraiture provided the bulk of his income for many years. He also sold his landscape watercolors in local stores.

Sawyier originals are on display in Frankfort, Kentucky at Liberty Hall & Orlando Brown House, Paul Sawyier Art Gallery, Kentucky History Center, Kings Daughter's Apartments, and at the University of Kentucky Art Museum in Lexington and Speed Art Museum in Louisville, Kentucky.

Some of Paul Sawyier's painting
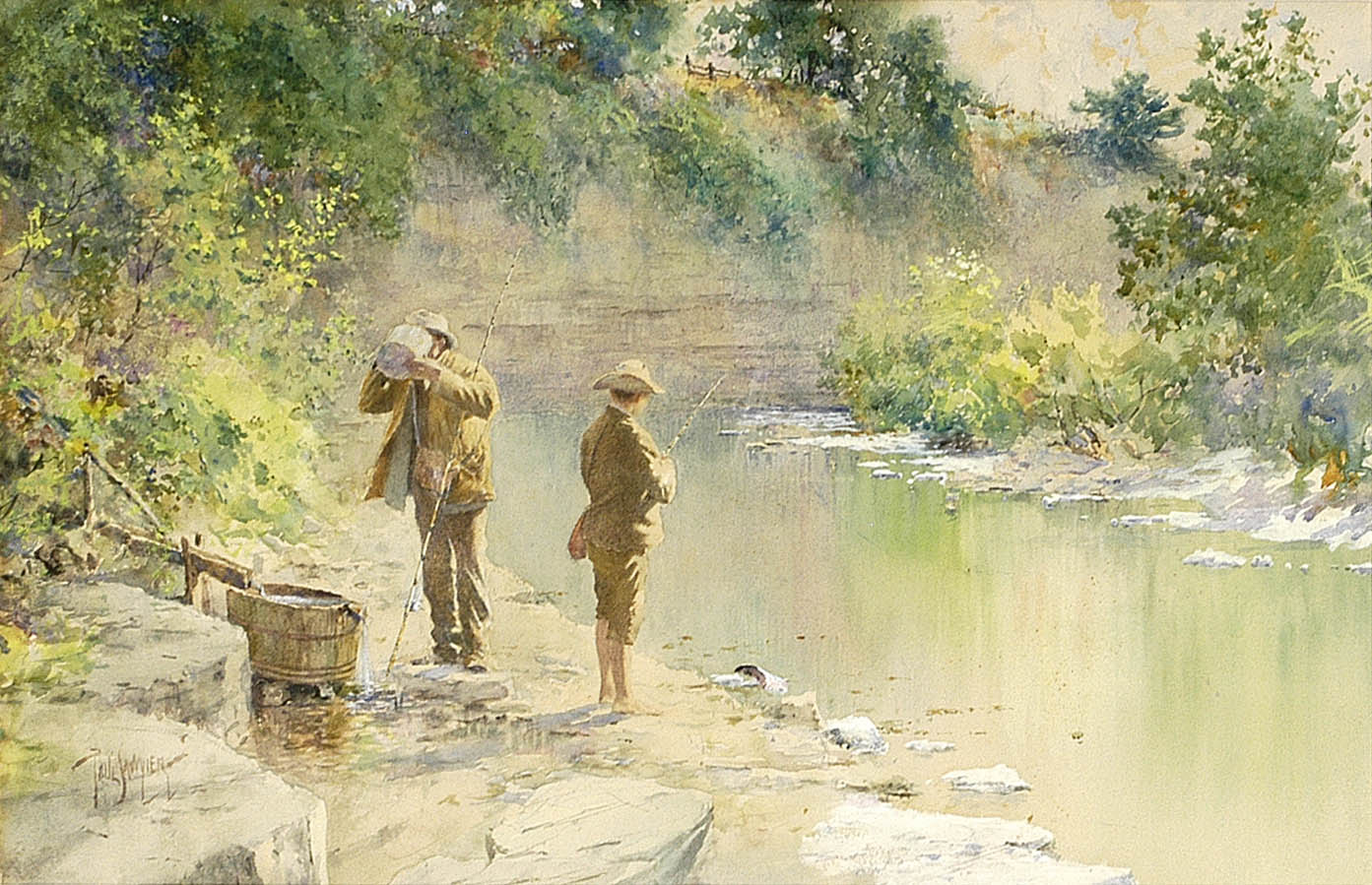
Kentucky Fishing Scene

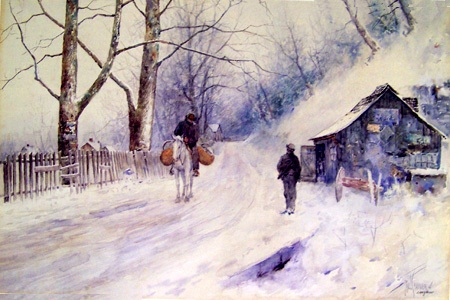
The Blacksmith Shop (Frankfort, Kentucky)

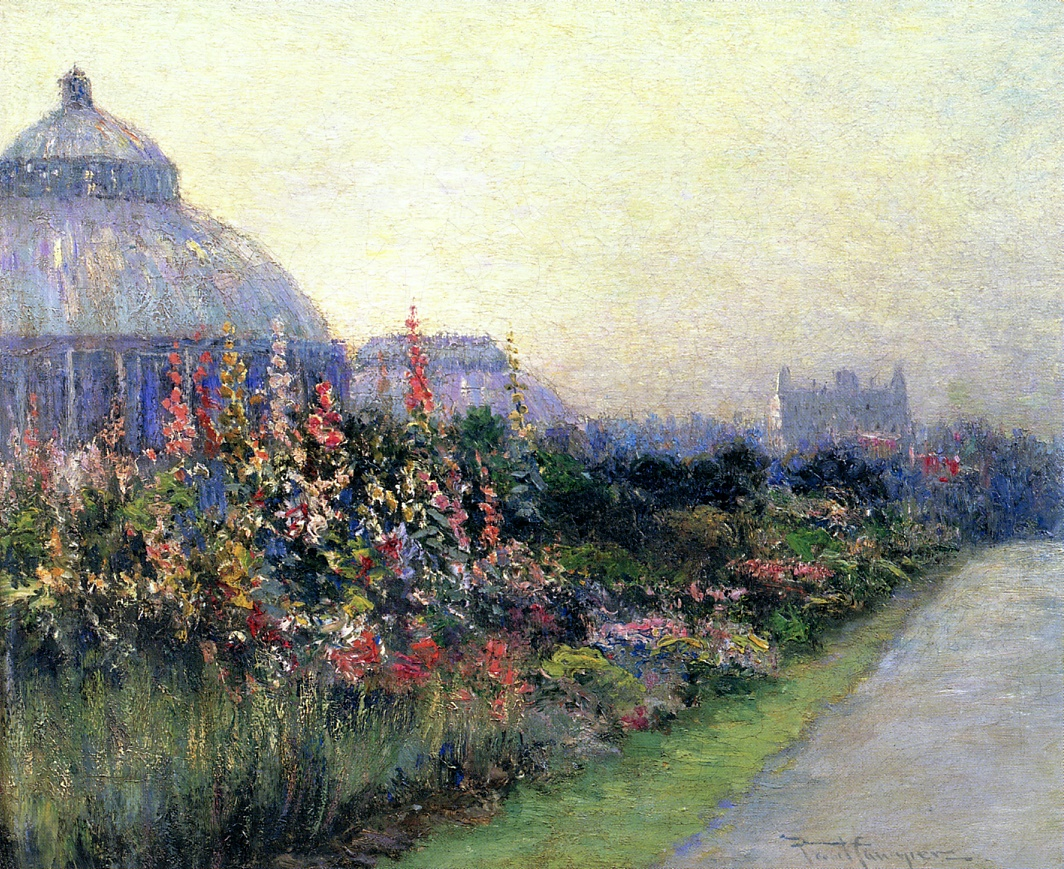
Brooklyn Botanical Gardens

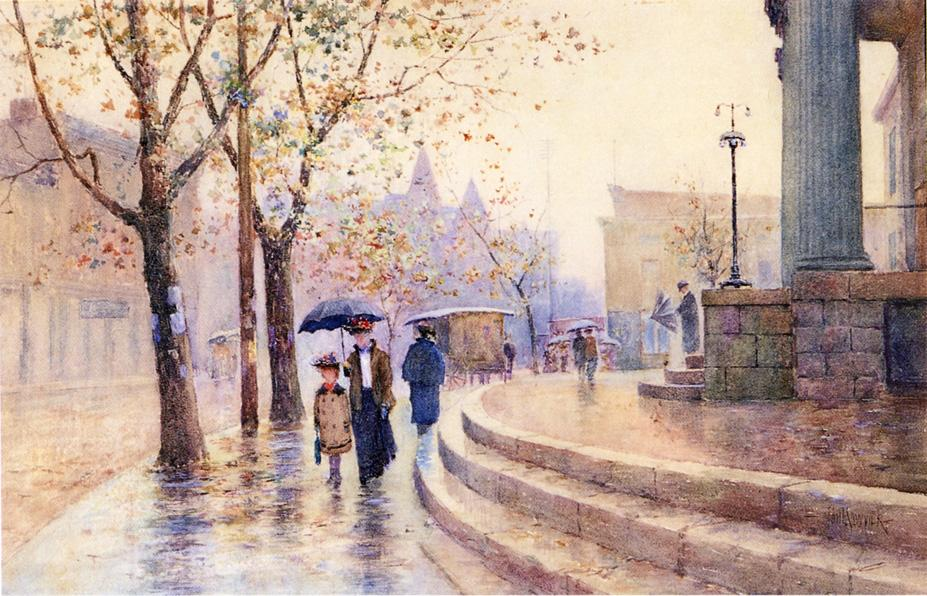
Walking in the Rain

== Later life and death ==
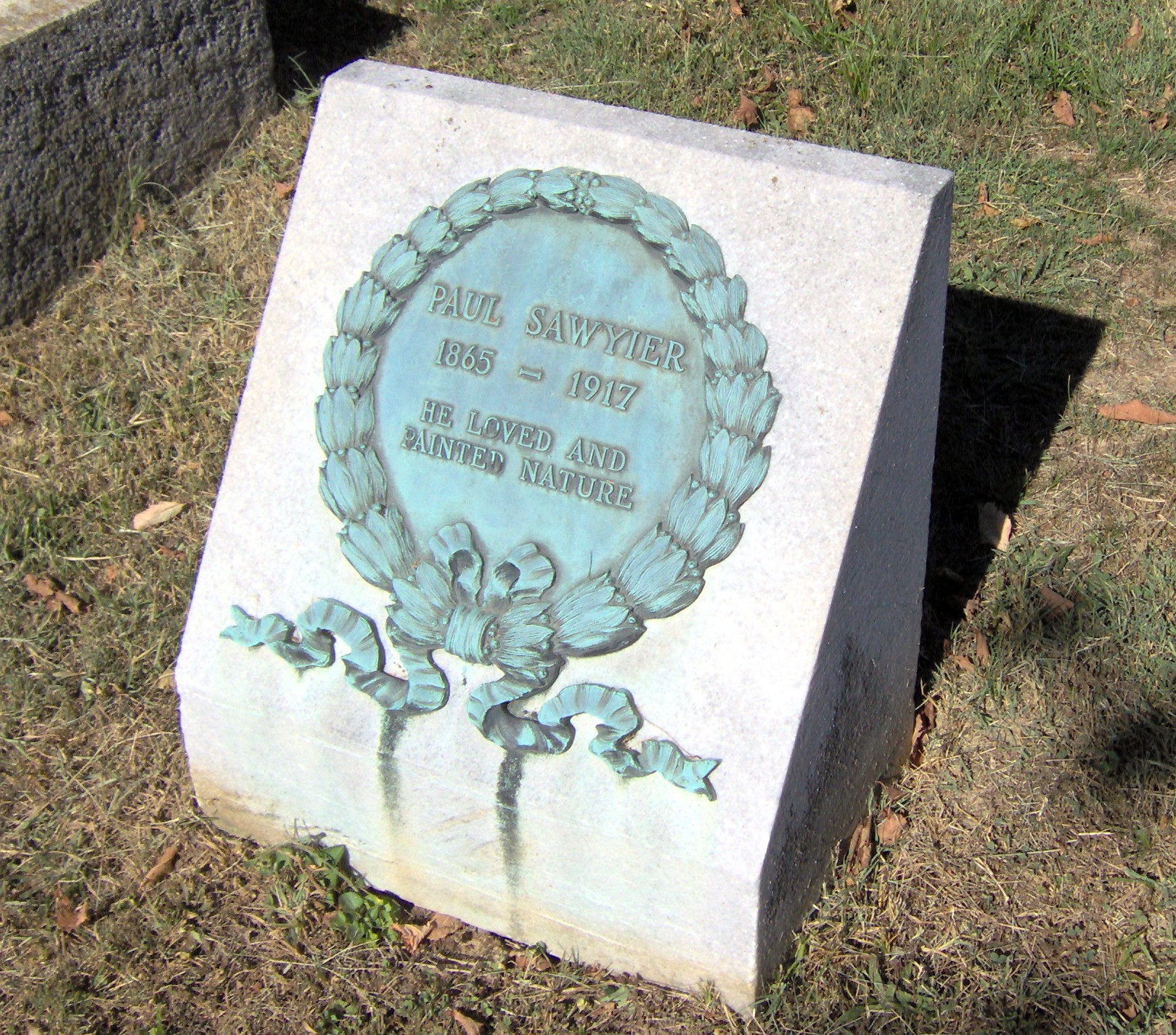
Gravestone of Sawyier located in Frankfort Cemetery.

In 1908 Sawyier moved his residence to a houseboat, a small tug boat, where he lived all year round. From 1913 until his death, Sawyier lived in a converted chapel at "Highpoint," the estate of art patron Mrs. Marshall L. Emory in the New York Catskills. While in New York, Sawyier began to binge drink using the money from the sale of his paintings. He found himself in debt, resulting in despression from his financial stress. On November 5, 1917, at the age of 52, Sawyier died of a heart attack. He was buried in a cemetery in Fleischmanns, New York. Five years later, his cousin, Judge Russel McReary, returned Sawyier's body to be reinterred on June 9, 1923, in the Sawyier-Wingate family plot in Frankfort Cemetery in Kentucky. At the time of his death it is estimated that he painted 3,000 works, mostly watercolor landscapes.
