= Fort Hill (Frankfort, Kentucky) =

Coordinates: 38.20467°N 84.87067°W

- Archeological Site 15 FR 368
- U.S. National Register of Historic Places
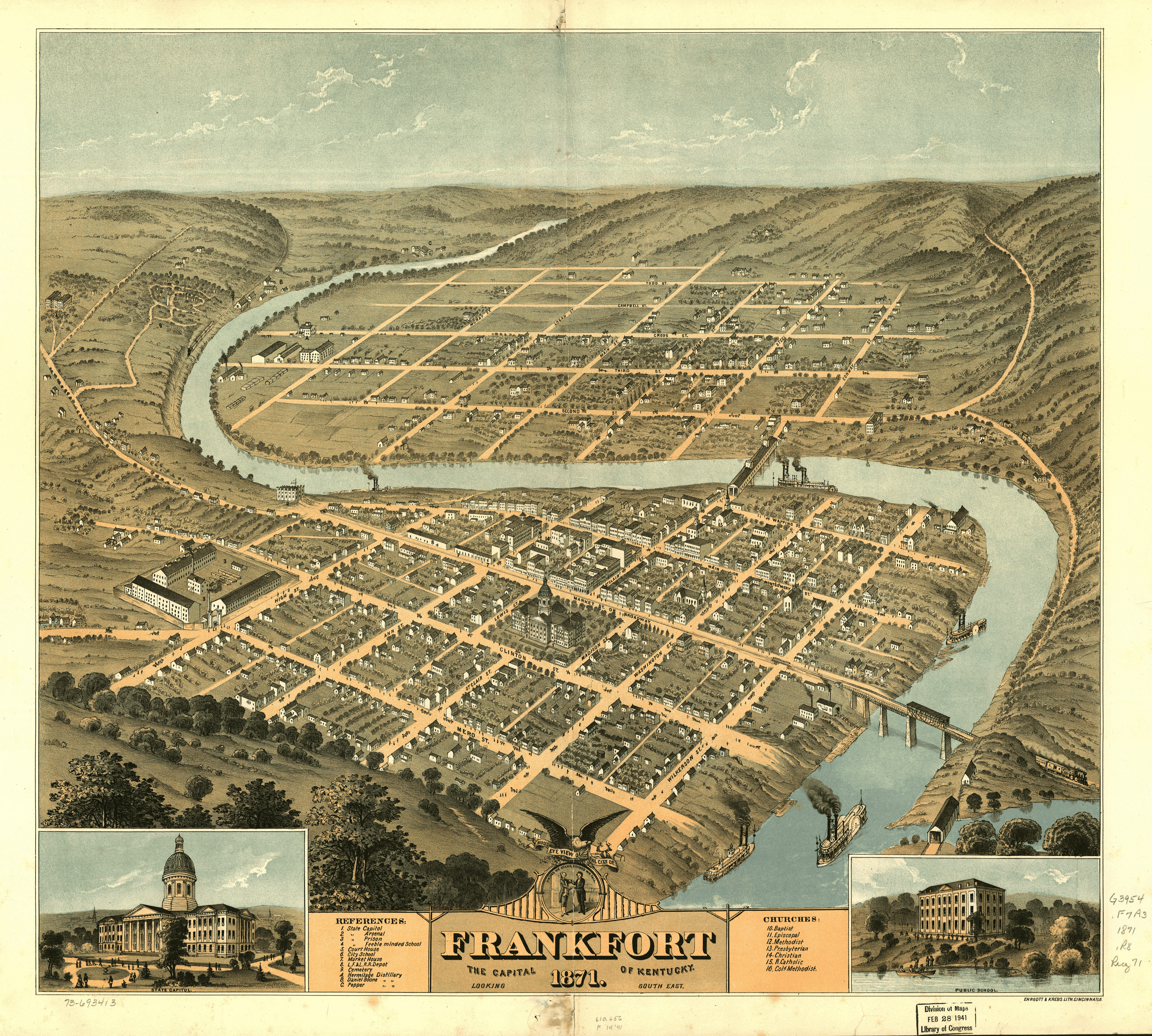
- 1871. Downtown Frankfort is seen in the foreground, while South Frankfort lies across the river in the background. Fort Hill is in the lower left hand corner.

- Location within Kentucky Location within the United States
- Nearest city: Frankfort, Kentucky
- Area: 4 acres (1.6 ha)
- Built: 1862
- NRHP reference No.: 85002370
- Added to NRHP: September 12, 1985

Fort Hill (formerly known as Blanton's Hill) is a promontory overlooking downtown Frankfort, Kentucky. It is the site of two earthwork forts from the American Civil War. Fort Hill is on the National Register of Historic Places and is now a public park.

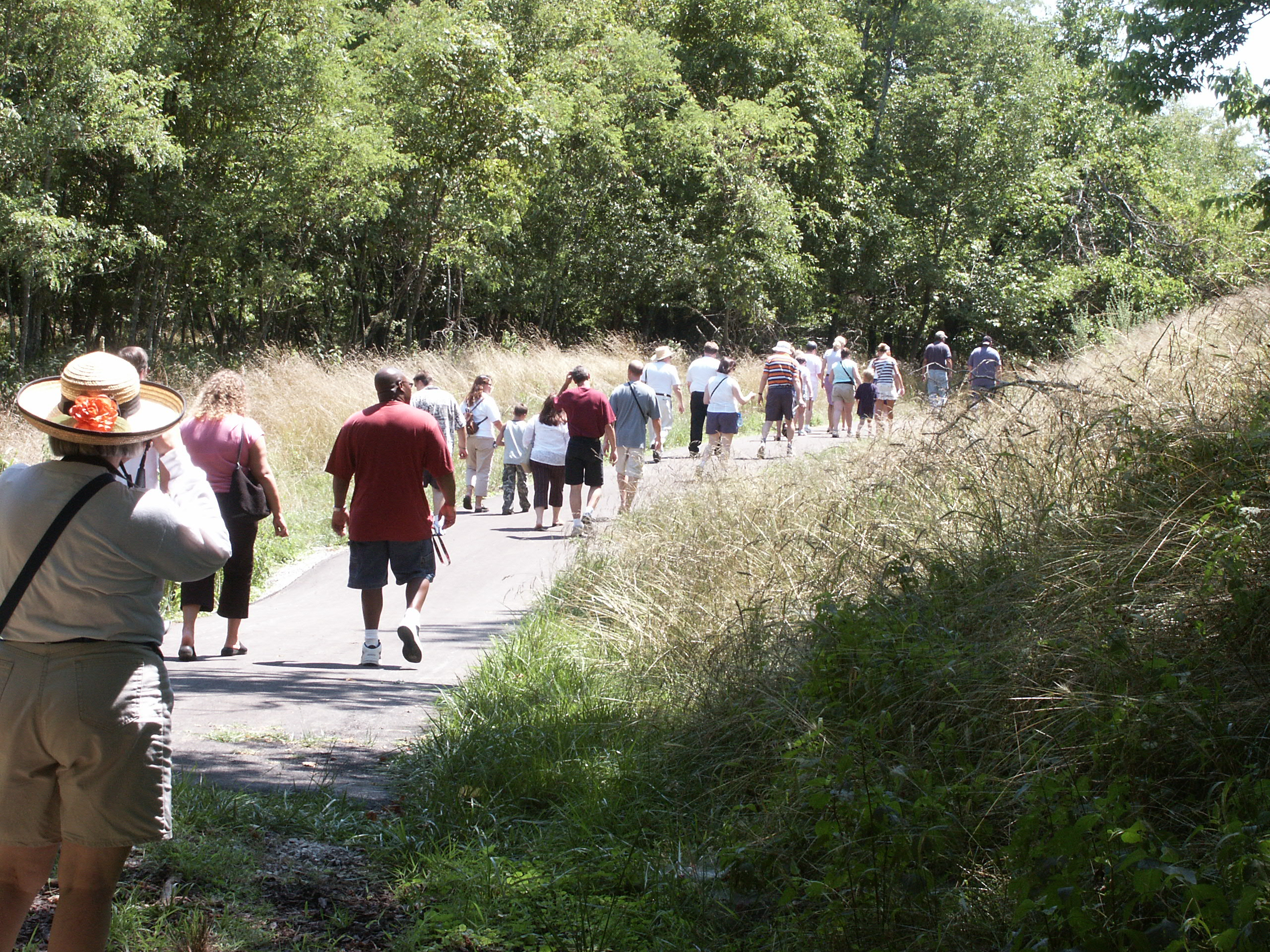
Tourists at Fort Hill.

== History ==
Military fortifications were built on the hill by the 103rd Ohio Infantry during the American Civil War to protect the city and its pro-Union state government. In September 1862, the Confederate States of America took control of Frankfort. Frankfort is the only Union capital to have been conquered by Confederate forces during the Civil War.

Although the Commonwealth of Kentucky did not secede from the Union, an attempt was made to set up a Confederate government at Bowling Green in western Kentucky. A Bluegrass Kentuckian, George W. Johnson of Scott County, was elected first Confederate Governor of Kentucky. He was killed at the Battle of Shiloh. After his death, Richard Hawes of Bourbon County was inaugurated the next Confederate governor at the Old Capitol Building in Frankfort, on October 4, 1862.

While the inauguration ceremonies were still underway, Federal forces appeared on the hill to the west of Frankfort and caused Governor Hawes and the Confederates to speedily conclude the ceremony and withdraw from Frankfort toward Versailles in Woodford County. When the Union forces advanced on Frankfort from Louisville on Oct. 4, 1862, the Southerners retreated south. Four days later, the Battle of Perryville was fought in Boyle County. Unable to capitalize on their battlefield success at Perryville, the Confederates left the state via the Cumberland Gap.

Two earthen forts, Fort Boone (not to be confused with Fort Boone) and the larger New Redoubt, were constructed by army engineers, 103rd Ohio Infantry, slave labor, and civilian labor. Written by Lyman Beecher Hannaford, 103rd OVI, March 26, 1863, "we have now moved our encampment up on the hill in the rear of the fort. The regiment moved yesterday morn early". In 1864, local militia in Fort Boone successfully repulsed an attack on Frankfort by raiders from the Confederate cavalry under John Hunt Morgan. Built after the Confederate capture of the Capitol, the New Redoubt never saw conflict and was abandoned soon after construction finished.

The land was then returned to farm and pastures, where modifications and adaptations to the Forts were completed in order to increase crop yield.

== Today ==
Fort Hill is now a park and historic site, owned and operated by the city of Frankfort's Parks, Recreation, and Historic Sites Department. The main attraction other than the two earthwork forts, is a tremendous a view of the city and the Kentucky River Valley. The 124-acre (0.50 km^{2}) heavily forested Leslie Morris Park at Fort Hill preserves the remains of the two Civil War earthwork forts. In the early 2000s, the park was heavily used for Civil War reenactments. In 2001, an early 1800s log house, formerly belonging to the Sullivan Family, was gifted to the city of Frankfort by the Kentucky Fish & Wildlife Department. It is now known as the Sullivan House Visitor Center, and is open seasonally for guests. The home contains a meeting space, a gift shop, and is the primary station for tour guides. It is open for visitors from Memorial Day until Halloween. The park is open year-round, from dawn until dusk.
