= Capital City Airport (Kentucky) =

- IATA: FFT; ICAO: KFFT; FAA LID: FFT

Summary
- Airport type: Public
- Owner: Commonwealth of Kentucky
- Serves: Frankfort, Kentucky
- Elevation AMSL: 812 ft (247 m)
- Coordinates: 38°10′55″N 084°54′22″W
- Website: cca.ky.gov
- Interactive map of Capital City Airport

Runways
Direction	Length		Surface
Direction	ft	m	Surface
7/25	5,506	1,678	Asphalt

Statistics (2022)
- Aircraft operations (year ending 6/20/2022): 39,216
- Based aircraft: 60
- Source: Federal Aviation Administration

Capital City Airport (IATA: FFT, ICAO: KFFT, FAA LID: FFT) is a public use airport located one nautical mile (1.85 km) southwest of the central business district of Frankfort, a city in Franklin County, Kentucky, United States. This airport is owned by the Commonwealth of Kentucky. It is used mostly for general aviation and, to a limited extent, for military aviation.

== Facilities and aircraft ==
Capital City Airport covers an area of 375 acres (152 ha) at an elevation of 812 feet (248 m) above mean sea level. It has one asphalt paved runway designated 7/25 which measures 5,506 by 100 feet (1,678 x 30 m).

For the 12-month period ending June 20, 2022, the airport had 39,216 aircraft operations, an average of 107 per day: 78% general aviation, 13% military, and 9% air taxi. At that time there were 60 aircraft based at this airport: 43 single-engine, 5 multi-engine, 1 jet, 7 helicopter, 3 military, and 1 ultralight.

== See also ==
- List of airports in Kentucky
