= Western Hills High School (Frankfort, Kentucky) =

Location
- 100 Doctors Drive; Frankfort, Kentucky 40601; United States; 38.16249°N 84.90778°W

Information
- Type: Public
- Motto: A tradition of excellence
- Established: 1981; 45 years ago
- School district: Franklin County Public Schools
- Principal: Geoff Cody
- Teaching staff: 45.00 (on an FTE basis)
- Grades: 9-12
- Enrollment: 855 (2023-2024)
- Student to teacher ratio: 19.00
- Campus: Small city
- Color
- Nickname: Wolverines
- Rival: Franklin County High School
- Website: whhs.franklin.kyschools.us/o/whhs

Western Hills High School is a 9–12 secondary school in Frankfort, Kentucky. It is the more recently constructed of the two high schools in the Franklin County Public Schools district, having opened to students in 1979. The first student body selected the Warrior as the mascot, as the feeding middle school's mascot is the Brave. However, that majority vote was overruled during that vote by the school's future first principal and the Wolverine became the mascot. There is a strong rivalry with Franklin County High School, the older school in the district.

== Academics ==
WHHS offers two diploma choices for students: Enrichment and Academic. The Enrichment Diploma requires 26 credits. The Academic option requires 27 credits . Students are graded on a 4-point GPA scale.

== Notable alumni ==
- J. T. Riddle (Class of 2010), Major League Baseball player
- Will Chase (Class of 1988), Broadway and television star
- Wan'Dale Robinson (Class of 2019), National Football League wide receiver for the Tennessee Titans.
