= Franklin County High School (Kentucky) =

Location
- 1100 East Main Street (US 60); Frankfort, Kentucky 40601; United States; 38.21087°N 84.82690°W

Information
- Type: Public
- Motto: Go Flyers!
- Established: 1958
- School district: Franklin County Public Schools
- Principal: Joey Thacker
- Teaching staff: 55.00 (on an FTE basis)
- Grades: 9–12
- Enrollment: 968 (2023–2024)
- Student to teacher ratio: 17.60
- Campus: Small city
- Colors: Navy, white and gold
- Mascot: Flyer
- Nickname: Flyers
- Website: fchs.franklin.kyschools.us/o/fchs

Franklin County High School is the largest of three public high schools in Frankfort, Kentucky, United States, and is one of two high schools operated by Franklin County Public Schools. The campus also houses the Franklin County Career & Technical Center, which offers vocational training. The principal of the school is Chris Tracy.

== History ==
Franklin County High was opened in the fall of 1958 and dedicated on November 30 of that year. It consolidated Elkhorn, Bridgeport, Bald Knob, and Peaks Mill High Schools. Franklin County is named for Benjamin Franklin, and the high school's mascot, the Flyer, was chosen in honor of Franklin's kite experiment. The mascot itself is a bird named "Freddie Falcon".

In 1981, the Franklin County district was split into two high school attendance zones with the opening of Western Hills High School, with Franklin County High now serving primarily the eastern half of the county, including eastern portions of the city of Frankfort. The central part of the city is served by a separate district, Frankfort Independent Schools, which operates the other public high school in the county, Frankfort High School.

In 1990, science classrooms and some math classrooms were enlarged, two computer labs were added, and the library was expanded. A more extensive renovation project began in the summer of 1997 and continued uninterrupted through the summer of 2001. The facade was updated, the original band room and administrative offices were torn down, and the original bus circle was removed. New music classrooms, practice rooms, business classrooms, and offices were constructed. Also added was a new center hallway on both the first and second floors; the second-floor hallway connects the original front wing with the back foyer. The cafeteria, auditorium, and gymnasium also were updated, and the library and the remaining original classrooms were enlarged.

In late 2015 Franklin County High School was featured in a national OxiClean commercial. The first of the two 30-second commercials is called "Pride", and it features the team's members and equipment manager sharing their enthusiasm for OxiClean and how clean the team's uniforms look.

In 2023, the school and community began building the Adam Hyatt Outdoor Classroom, an outdoor learning space on campus created in memory of teacher Adam Hyatt, who died in 2019.

== Head principals ==
- Clyde Orr (1958–1959)
- Garland Kemper (1959–1960)
- Ronald Connelly (1960–1963)
- Elmer Moore (1963–1966)
- John Underwood (1966–1967)
- Robert Hoagland (1967–1991)
- Jim Shrock (1991–1999)
- Mike Henderson (1999)
- Sharon Collett (1999–2012)
- Stirling "Buddy" Sampson (2012–2017)
- Charles Lewis (2017–2021)
- Chris Tracy (2022–2026)
- Joey Thacker (2026–present)

== Academics ==
FCHS offers two diploma choices for students: Enrichment and Academic diplomas. Students are graded on a 4-point GPA scale.

== JROTC ==
There is an Air Force Junior ROTC Wing at the school. KY-20021 supports the school by providing Color Guards for home football and basketball games. The Color Guard has presented flags flown over the capital for former congressman Ben Chandler at Hearn Elementary, and also participated in the 2007 Inauguration Parade for the former Governor of Kentucky, Steve Beshear and the 2015 Inauguration Parade for the former Governor Matt Bevin.

The rifle exhibition team started in 2005, has performed for the school, a Kentucky State University football game at halftime, and various elementary schools in the area.

== Athletics ==
The school is a member of the Kentucky High School Athletic Association (KHSAA). FCHS offers its students the opportunity to participate in multiple sports:

- Boys and girls:
  - Cheerleading (not governed by KHSAA), basketball, cross country, golf, soccer, swimming, track and field, tennis, Archery
- Boys:
  - Baseball, football, wrestling
- Girls:
  - Dance Team (not governed by KHSAA), softball, volleyball

The Flyers' football stadium, Benny Watkins Field, also hosts the sprint football team of nearby Midway University. Sprint football is a variant of American football which restricts player weights to 178 pounds (81 kg). Midway began play in that sport in 2022.

=== Team records ===
Team	Year	Achievement
Football	2025	Class 4A state championship runner-up
Esports	2023	State champions (Rocket League)
Girls' Basketball	2021	Sweet Sixteen Appearance
Football	2020	Class 4A state championship runner-up
Girls' Basketball	2020	Sweet Sixteen Appearance
Girls' Basketball	2017	State runners-up
Girls' Basketball	2016	State runners-up
Girls' Basketball	2015	Sweet Sixteen Appearance
Chess Club	2007	Most Checkmates
Dance Team	2004	National champions (beat 3 teams in division)
Baseball	2001	State Final Four
Softball	1995–2006	11th most wins (200)
Girls' Golf	1996	State champions
Girls' Golf	1995	State champions
Boys' Basketball	1995	Sweet Sixteen Appearance
Boys' Golf	1991	State champions
Boys' Golf	1990	State champions
Girls' Basketball	1998	5th most rebounds in a season (1,355)
Boys' Cross Country	1986	AA state champions
Girls' Cross Country	1986	AA state runners-up
Girls' Cross Country	1983	AA state runners-up
Girls' Basketball	1980	State runners-up
Football	1979	Undefeated regular season
Football	1978	AAAA state at-large runners-up
Girls' Cross Country	1977	AA state runners-up
Girls' Cross Country	1975	AA state champions
Girls' Track and Field	1972	AA state champions
Girls' Track and Field	1972	AA state champions
Girls' Track and Field	1971	AA state champions

=== Theatre productions ===
Year	Production	Type
2026	Hadestown	Musical
2025	The SpongeBob Musical	Musical
2024	Mean Girls	Musical
2023	Seussical	Musical
2022	Matilda the Musical	Musical
2020	Little Shop of Horrors	Musical
2019	Hairspray	Musical
2018	Shrek the Musical	Musical
2017	The Addams Family	Musical
2017	The Outsiders	Play
2016	The Little Mermaid	Musical
2015	Legally Blonde	Musical
2013	Oklahoma!	Musical
2012	Cinderella	Musical
2011	Footloose	Musical

== Notable alumni ==
- Logan Woodside, NFL quarterback for the Atlanta Falcons
