= Henry W. Barry =

American politician (1840–1875)

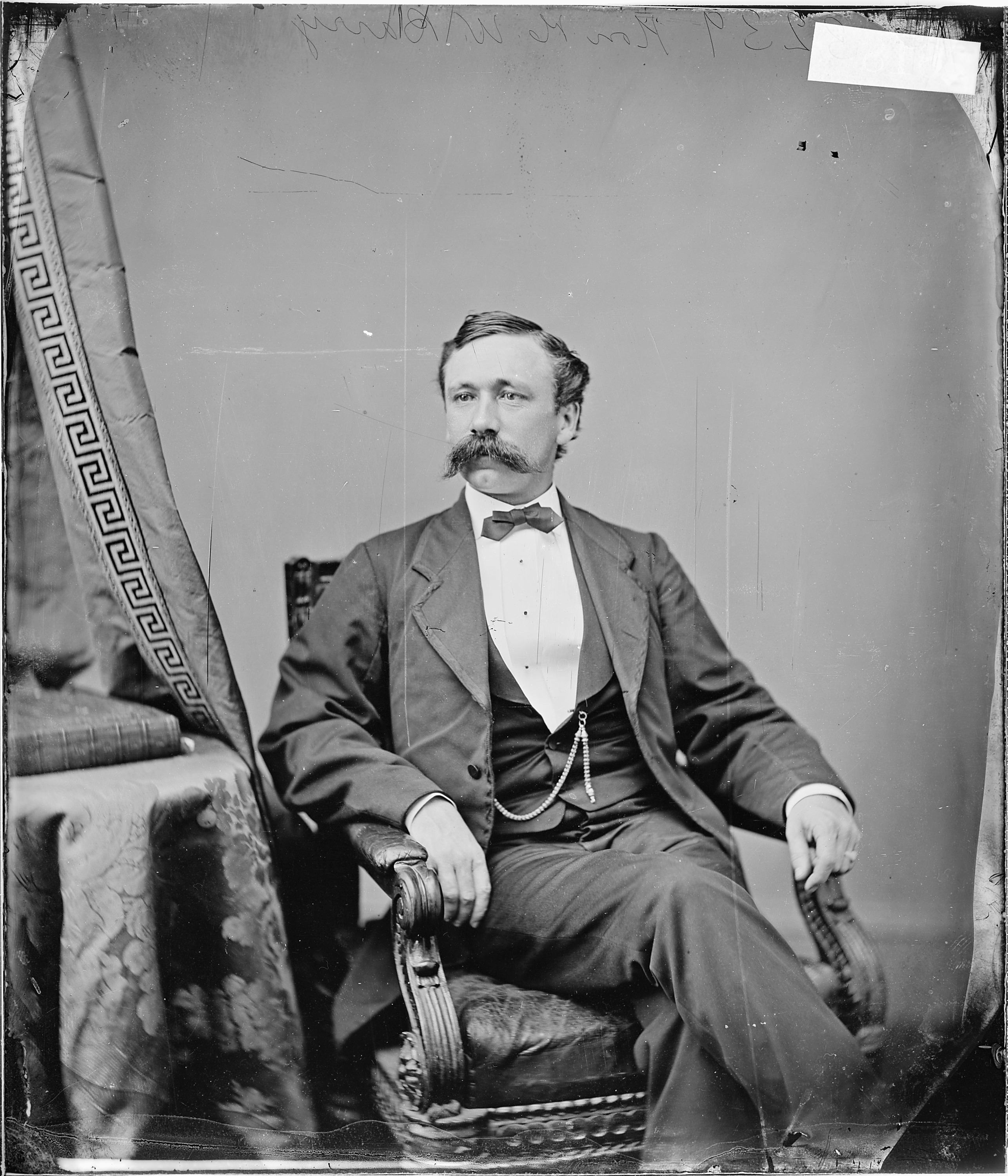
- Congressman Henry W. Barry

Member of the U.S. House of Representatives from Mississippi's 3rd district
- In office April 8, 1870 – March 4, 1875
- Preceded by: William Barksdale
- Succeeded by: Hernando Money

Personal details
- Born: April 1840 Schoharie County, New York, US
- Died: June 7, 1875 (aged 35) Washington, D.C., US
- Party: Republican
- Spouse: Kate Thyson Barry
- Profession: Soldier, lawyer, politician

Military service
- Allegiance: United States
- Branch/service: United States Army; Union Army
- Years of service: 1861–1866
- Rank: Brevet Brigadier General; Colonel
- Unit: 10th Kentucky Volunteer Infantry
- Commands: 8th U.S. Colored Heavy Artillery
- Battles/wars: American Civil War

Henry W. Barry (April 1840 – June 7, 1875) was a Union army officer during the American Civil War, reaching the rank of Brevet Brigadier General. He commanded a regiment of United States Colored Troops. After the war, he became an attorney and politician.

Born in New York, Barry moved to Kentucky as a young man to teach school. He enlisted there in the Union Army during the war, being commissioned as an officer. In 1862 Barry recruited African Americans to Kentucky's militia. After the United States Colored Troops were established in 1863, Barry served as an officer of an African-American unit stationed in Kentucky and Texas.

After the war Barry earned a law degree in Washington, D.C. He moved to Columbus, Mississippi, where he set up a practice and became involved in politics. He served as a delegate to the 1867 state constitutional convention, and was elected to the Mississippi State Senate in 1868. In 1870 he was elected as U.S. Representative from Mississippi's 3rd congressional district, serving until 1875. He died shortly after, at age 35.

== Early life and Civil War service ==
Born in Schoharie County, New York in 1840, Henry Barry was a largely self-educated man. At the age of eighteen, he moved to Kentucky, where he taught at Locust Grove Academy near Louisville. When the Civil War started, Barry enlisted in the Union Army as a private. He was commissioned as First Lieutenant of Company H in the 10th Kentucky Volunteer Infantry on November 21, 1861.

He served about a year, resigning on November 17, 1862, to assist in the recruitment of colored troops in Kentucky. He was commissioned Colonel of the 1st Regiment Kentucky Heavy Artillery, African Descent on April 28, 1864, when it was organized at Paducah. The regiment was renamed as 8th United States Colored Heavy Artillery around that time, as the United States Colored Troops had been established. Stationed to defend Fort Anderson, Kentucky, Barry and his men took part in the skirmishes of Haddix's Ferry and Smithland.

Barry was promoted to Brevet Brigadier General in the wave of mass actions of March 13, 1865 in the closing days of the war. In April 1865 the regiment was transferred to Texas for occupational duty. There the regiment was mustered out in February 1866, and Barry followed on May 11.

== Law and politics in later life ==
After the war Barry moved to Washington, D.C. to study law, graduating from the law department of Columbian College (now George Washington University) in 1867. Admitted to the bar the same year, he moved to Mississippi, where he set up a practice in Columbus. There Barry entered politics, serving as delegate to the State constitutional convention in 1867 and being elected as a Republican Party member of the Mississippi State Senate in 1868.

After Mississippi was readmitted to the Union in 1870, Barry was elected as Republican representative of Mississippi's 3rd congressional district, succeeding Confederate General William Barksdale. He was elected for the Forty-first, Forty-second, and Forty-third Congresses, serving from April 8, 1870, to March 4, 1875. During that period, he was chairman of the Committee on Expenditures in the Post Office Department (Forty-second and Forty-third Congresses).

In 1874 Barry nominated Henry E. Baker to the United States Naval Academy; he was the nation's third African-American naval cadet. After most blacks were disenfranchised across the South due to states' imposing barriers to voter registration, no African Americans received appointments to the Naval Academy for more than six decades.

Barry died at the age of 35 in Washington, D.C. shortly after his term ended. He was interred in Oak Hill Cemetery on June 7, 1875. He was survived by his wife Kate (Thyson) Barry (1850-1907) and their son Frank Thyson "Francis" Barry (1874-1889).

== Notes ==
U.S. House of Representatives
Preceded by William Barksdale (Prior to Civil War)	Member of the U.S. House of Representatives from Mississippi's 3rd congressional district April 8, 1870 – March 4, 1875	Succeeded by Hernando Money
