= 8th Regiment Heavy Artillery U.S. Colored Troops =

8th U.S. Colored Heavy Artillery
- Active: 1864–1866
- Country: United States of America
- Branch: Union Army; US Colored Troops
- Type: Heavy Artillery
- Garrison/HQ: Fort Anderson (Kentucky)
- Engagements: American Civil War: Battle of Paducah; Skirmish at Haddix's Ferry, July 1864

Commanders
- Notable commanders: Henry W. Barry

The 8th United States Colored Heavy Artillery Regiment was an artillery regiment of African-American troops recruited from Kentucky that served in the Union Army during the American Civil War.

== Unit history ==
Initially organized at Paducah as the 1st Kentucky Heavy Artillery, African Descent, the regiment was renamed the 7th Regiment Heavy Artillery U.S. Colored Troops, then received its final designation as the 8th Heavy Artillery on April 26, 1864. Most African-American artillery units recruited in the Civil War were assigned to heavy artillery, meaning they manned cannons built within fixed fortifications, rather than mobile field artillery.

The regiment was based at Fort Anderson for the entirety of the war and took part in the Battle of Paducah, an 1864 Confederate raid on the town led by General Nathan Bedford Forrest's cavalry troops. During this battle, the newly recruited soldiers of the regiment successfully repelled a Confederate attack on the fort. Afterwards, the commander of Fort Anderson's garrison, Stephen G. Hicks wrote: "Permit me to remark that I have been one of those men who never had much confidence in colored troops fighting, but those doubts are now all removed, for they fought as bravely as any troops in the fort."

A detachment from the regiment took part in a skirmish with Confederate troops on July 27, 1864, near Haddix's Ferry, Kentucky.

Once the war ended, the 8th Heavy Artillery was one of several USCT regiments sent to Brownsville, Texas to guard the Mexican border. General Godfrey Weitzel ranked the 8th Heavy Artillery as the least effective of the 18 Black regiments under his command, most likely due to lack of combat experience and effective officers. The regiment was mustered out of service on February 10, 1866.

== Commanders ==
Commanding officers of the regiment:

- Col. Henry W. Barry
- Lt. Col. James D. McBride
- Lt. Col. Richard D. Cunningham

== See also ==
- List of United States Colored Troops Civil War units
