= Susan Bradley (disambiguation) =

Susan Bradley (born 1940) is a Canadian psychiatrist.

Susan or Sue Bradley may also refer to:

- Susan Hinckley Bradley (1851–1929), American painter
- Susan Bradley-Cox (born 1937), American triathlete
- Sue Worthington Bradley (1883–1970), American first lady of Guam

== See also ==
- Susan Brawley (born 1951), American academic marine ecologist
