= Battle of Paducah =

Battle of the American Civil War

Coordinates: 37.0931°N 88.6058°W

- Part of the American Civil War
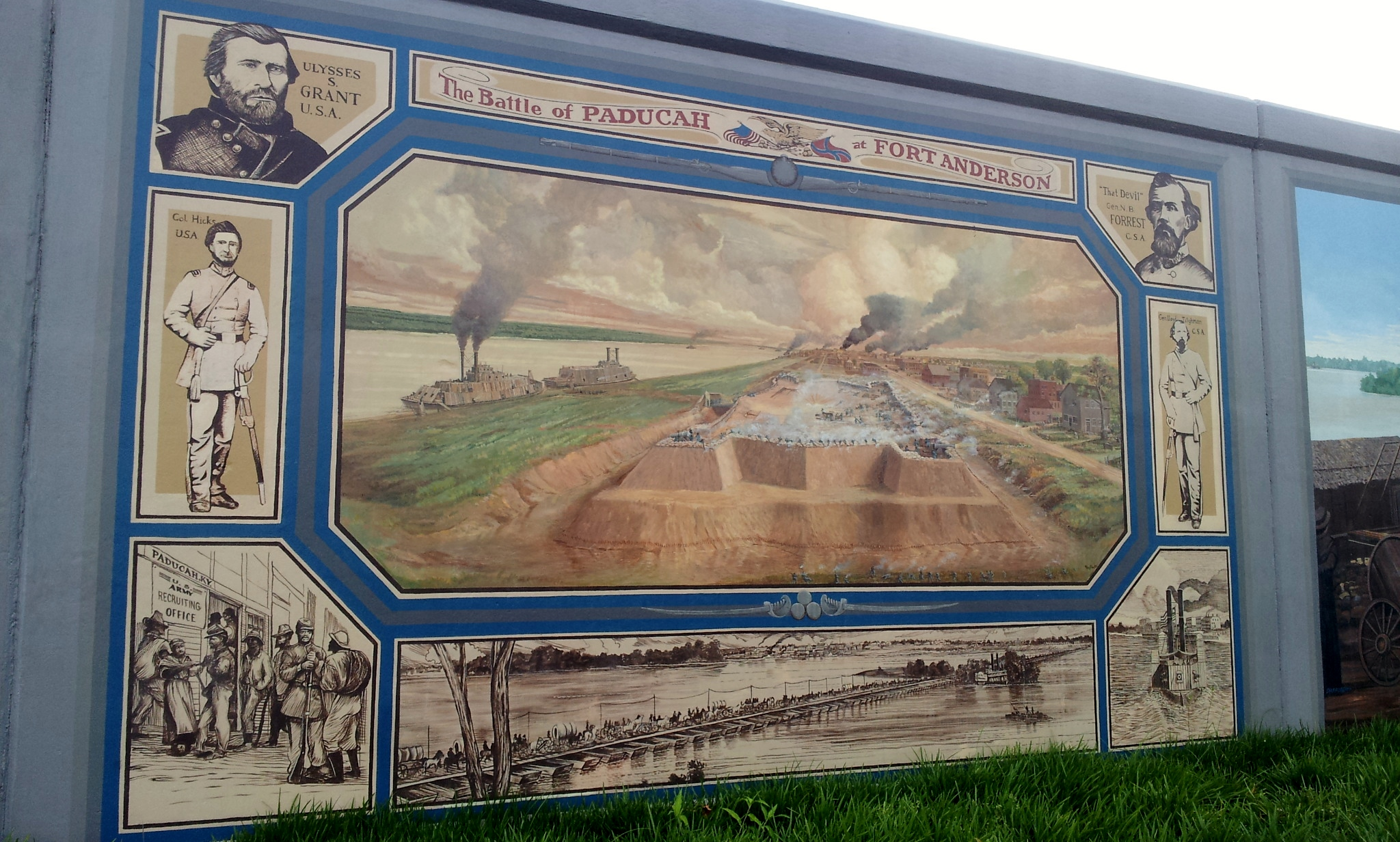
- Depiction of the battle at flood barrier in Paducah, Kentucky
Date	March 25, 1864
Location	McCracken County, Kentucky
Result	Confederate victory

Belligerents
United States of America (Union)	(Confederate States of America) CSA (Confederacy)

Commanders and leaders
Stephen G. Hicks; James Shirk	Nathan Bedford Forrest

Units involved
8th Colored Heavy Artillery; 16th Kentucky Cavalry; 122nd Illinois Infantry; USS Peosta (1857); USS Paw Paw (1863)	Forrest's Cavalry Corps

Strength
650 men 2 gunboats	3,000

Casualties and losses
90	50

The Battle of Paducah was fought on March 25, 1864, during the American Civil War. A Confederate cavalry force led by Maj. Gen. Nathan Bedford Forrest moved into Tennessee and Kentucky to capture Union supplies. Tennessee had been occupied by Union troops since 1862. He launched a successful raid on Paducah, Kentucky, on the Ohio River.

== Events ==
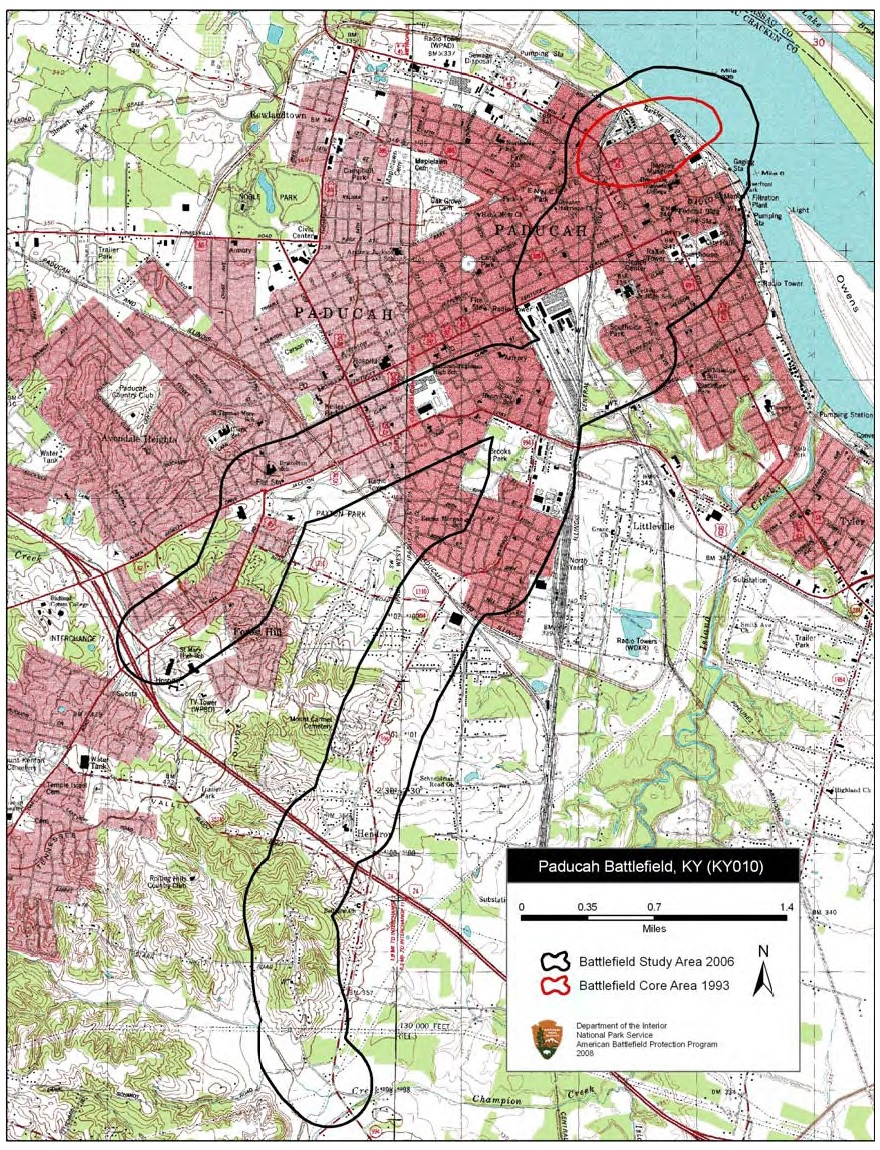
Map of Paducah Battlefield core and study areas by the American Battlefield Protection Program.

In March 1864, Forrest set out from Columbus, Mississippi, for raiding in West Tennessee and Kentucky, with a force of just under 3,000 men. His object was to recruit soldiers, re-equip his men with supplies, and disrupt Union activities. He reached Paducah on March 25 and quickly occupied the town. The Union garrison of 650 men under Col. Stephen G. Hicks withdrew to Fort Anderson, in the town's west end. The fort was supported by two Union gunboats on the Ohio River, and Hicks began shelling the area with his artillery.

Forrest tried to bluff Hicks into surrendering, warning him, "... if I have to storm your works, you may expect no quarter." Knowing the fort could not be easily taken, Hicks rejected the demand.

With the Union garrison holed up in their fort, Forrest's men began loading any Union Army supplies they could use into wagons and destroyed the rest. They rounded up all the army horses and mules they could find. A portion of Forrest's men from Kentucky decided to attack Fort Anderson on their own, much to his irritation. This attack constituted the Battle of Paducah. It was repulsed, causing the Confederates heavy and needless casualties, including Colonel A.P. Thompson, a native of Paducah who led the unauthorized assault on the federal fortifications. In reporting on the raid, many newspapers stated that Forrest missed more than a hundred fine horses hidden by the Yankees. As a result, Forrest sent Colonel Abraham Buford back to Paducah in mid-April and he captured these horses.

Casualties during the Paducah raid totaled 90 Union soldiers and 50 Confederates, most of them during the attack on the fort. The raid was counted as a victory for the Confederates because they had fewer casualties and gained some supplies, but they achieved little beyond destroying Union supplies and capturing needed cavalry mounts. They did not take the fort or alter control of the region. The raid put the Union Army on notice that Forrest and other Confederates raiders could still strike deep into Union-held territory.

The attack on Fort Anderson was the first time Forrest's Cavalry had fought African-American soldiers, as the newly recruited Black troops of the 1st Kentucky Heavy Artillery successfully repelled the assault on the fort. One historian has argued that the anger of Forrest's men towards the Black troops who thwarted their attack and refused Forrest's demand to surrender led to the massacre of surrendering Black troops at Fort Pillow, Tennessee two weeks later.

== See also ==
- List of battles fought in Kentucky
