= Paducah International Raceway =

Racetrack

PIR
- Location: 4445 Shemwell Lane; Paducah, KY
- Coordinates: 36.969°N 88.5589°W
- Owner: Adam and Brittany Elliott
- Opened: 1972
- Major events: USA World 50, ATV Nationals, UMP Dirt Car Summer Nationals

Oval
- Surface: Clay
- Length: 0.37 mi (6/10 km)
- Turns: 4

Paducah International Raceway (PIR) is a 3/8 mile, clay oval track located near Paducah, Kentucky. UMP Super Late Models, CARS Crate Late Models, UMP Open Wheel Modified, UMP Pure Streets, Warrior, and Mini Sprints have raced at PIR. PIR also hosted Demolition Derby events.

The track was first opened in 1972 and was operated by numerous ownership groups until it was purchased by NASCAR drivers Dale Earnhardt Jr. and Kenny Schrader along with promoter Bob Sargent in 2005. This was Earnhardt Jr.'s first track while Schrader and Sargent both previously owned tracks in Illinois and Missouri. The group was joined by NASCAR driver Tony Stewart in late 2006, who also owned Eldora Speedway in Rossburg, Ohio, and is part owner in Macon Speedway, Macon, Illinois.

The track's signature race was the USA World 50, billed as "The World's Richest 50-Lap Race". First held in 1978, the race featured Super Late Model racing cars. The race featured drivers from the MARS Racing Series and the UMP Racing Series.

At the end of the 2016 season, the track went dormant, with no racing taking place in the 2017 season. The track reopened in April 2018, but was again shut down in May of that year. This led to a dispute between the owners and those who purchased season tickets, expecting a full racing season. In 2021 the track was purchased and has been holding events since May 2022.
