= Blockware Mining =

- Industry: Cryptocurrency mining
- Area served: Kentucky
- Products: Bitcoin mining infrastructure
- Services: Bitcoin mining

Blockware Mining was an American cryptocurrency mining company. Blockware Mining operated bitcoin mining facilities and infrastructure projects, particularly in western Kentucky. Riot Platforms acquired Blockware Mining for approximately $140 million on July 23, 2024.

== Background ==
Blockware Mining emerged as part of a broader expansion of cryptocurrency mining in Kentucky in the early 2020s, supported by state-level tax incentives which were aimed at attracting energy-intensive industries. The company was approved for state tax incentives tied to a proposed facility in Paducah, Kentucky. Newspapers in Illinois, Indiana, and Kentucky reported on the company's role in the growth of cryptocurrency mining operations in the Ohio Valley and surrounding areas.

Industry publications reported that the company raised approximately $25 million in 2021 to expand its bitcoin mining operations and increase its computational capacity.

Public radio reporting placed Blockware among several firms contributing to the rise of cryptocurrency mining in the Ohio Valley, a development linked to regional economic transition and access to low-cost electricity.
