= Paducah–McCracken County Riverport =

Port authority in Kentucky, USA

Coordinates: 37.068°N 88.582°W

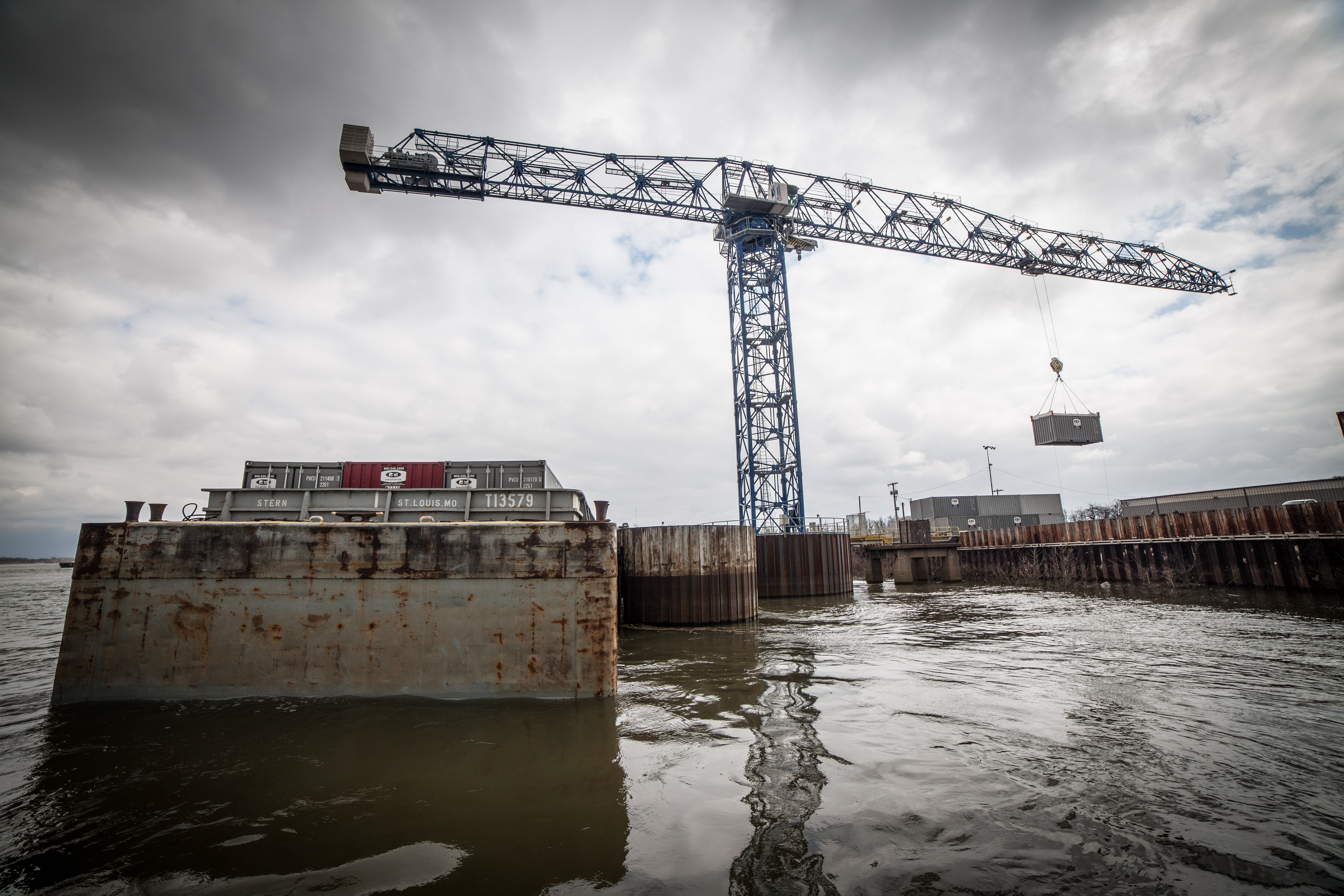
Container on Barge Service at the Paducah-McCracken County Riverport Authority

The Paducah–McCracken County Riverport Authority is a port on the Tennessee River in Kentucky, United States, established in 1964.

== Description ==
The Riverport Authority was established in 1964 by the legislative bodies of McCracken County and the City of Paducah in Kentucky, United States, under an equal ownership agreement. The port is a quasi-government agency that provides essential maritime services for the rural regions of Western Kentucky, Southern Illinois, Southeast Missouri, and Northwestern Tennessee. The operating port facility is located between river mile 1.3 and 2.0 on the left descending bank of the Tennessee River, near its confluence with the Ohio River. This property is in the City of Paducah and in McCracken County, Kentucky.

Paducah is at the heart of the Central U.S. MARAD's Marine Highway System. It lies at the confluence of the Tennessee-Tombigbee Waterway (M-65) and the Ohio River (M-70) and near the confluence of the Cumberland River and Ohio River and near the confluence of the Ohio and Mississippi River (M-55).

The Port is physically located at 2000 Wayne Sullivan Drive in Paducah, Kentucky, at the confluence of the Ohio and Tennessee Rivers and is located approximately 30 miles from the confluence of the Ohio and Mississippi Rivers. The Port is located on a section of 0.43 miles on the banks of a channel on the Tennessee River. The Port is also the northernmost, ice-free inland port facility in the U.S., which guarantees year-round shipment of cargoes and can serve as a diversion port for cargoes to be offloaded in the event of northern ports being frozen.

The central location provides any industry a strategic logistical advantage, which allows the Jackson Purchase Area region of Kentucky to become a major hub for manufacturing and distribution centers access to utilize all four multimodal modes of transportation - water, rail, road, and air. The region offers a reliable supply chain model with access to over 65% – according to the Kentucky Cabinet of Economic Development – of the U.S. population and Canadian border within a single day's drive.

== Marine Highway Designation and Container on Barge Service ==
MARAD's American Marine Highway Program was established by Section 1121 of the Energy Independence and Security Act of 2007 to reduce landside congestion through the designation of MARAD's Marine Highway Routes. The program was further expanded from reducing landside congestion to generate public benefits by increasing the utilization or efficiency of domestic freight or passenger transportation on MARAD's Marine Highway Routes between U.S. ports. In 2016, The National Defense Authorization Act for Fiscal Year 2016 added to the definition of short sea shipping to include cargo shipped in discrete units or packages that are handled individually, palletized or unitized for purposes of transportation; or freight vehicles carried aboard commuter ferry boats.

The Paducah–McCracken County Riverport Authority submitted a MARAD's Marine Highway Designation Application for a Container on Barge Service (COB) along the M-55, M-65, and M-70 systems on December 30, 2015. After an extensive review, The Paducah–McCracken County Riverport Authority was awarded a MARAD Marine Highway Designation on July 7, 2016, from MARAD.

The Paducah–McCracken County Riverport Authority is the only Department of Transportation - Maritime Administration (MARAD) Marine Highway Designation on the Ohio River and the only Marine Highway port on the Ohio River that is designated for Container on Barge service. The Paducah–McCracken County Riverport Authority intends to create the first Container on Barge service on the Tennessee River, the Ohio River, and the first in the state of Kentucky. Container on Barge (COB) service at its simplest form is a method of transportation utilizing containerized cargoes, as seen on international container ships, and placing the containerized cargoes on barges for transport throughout the inland waterway system.

In 2017, Admiral Mark H. Buzby, the Maritime Administrator of the Department of Transportation said that the "Paducah-McCracken County Riverport is the strategic center of a very valuable and impressive complex of integrated ports, multi-modal connectors, and productive inland waterways. It is a model for the rest of the country." Admiral Buzby also stated that Paducah is home to more U.S.-flag inland waterway operators than anywhere else in the nation.

== Cargo ==
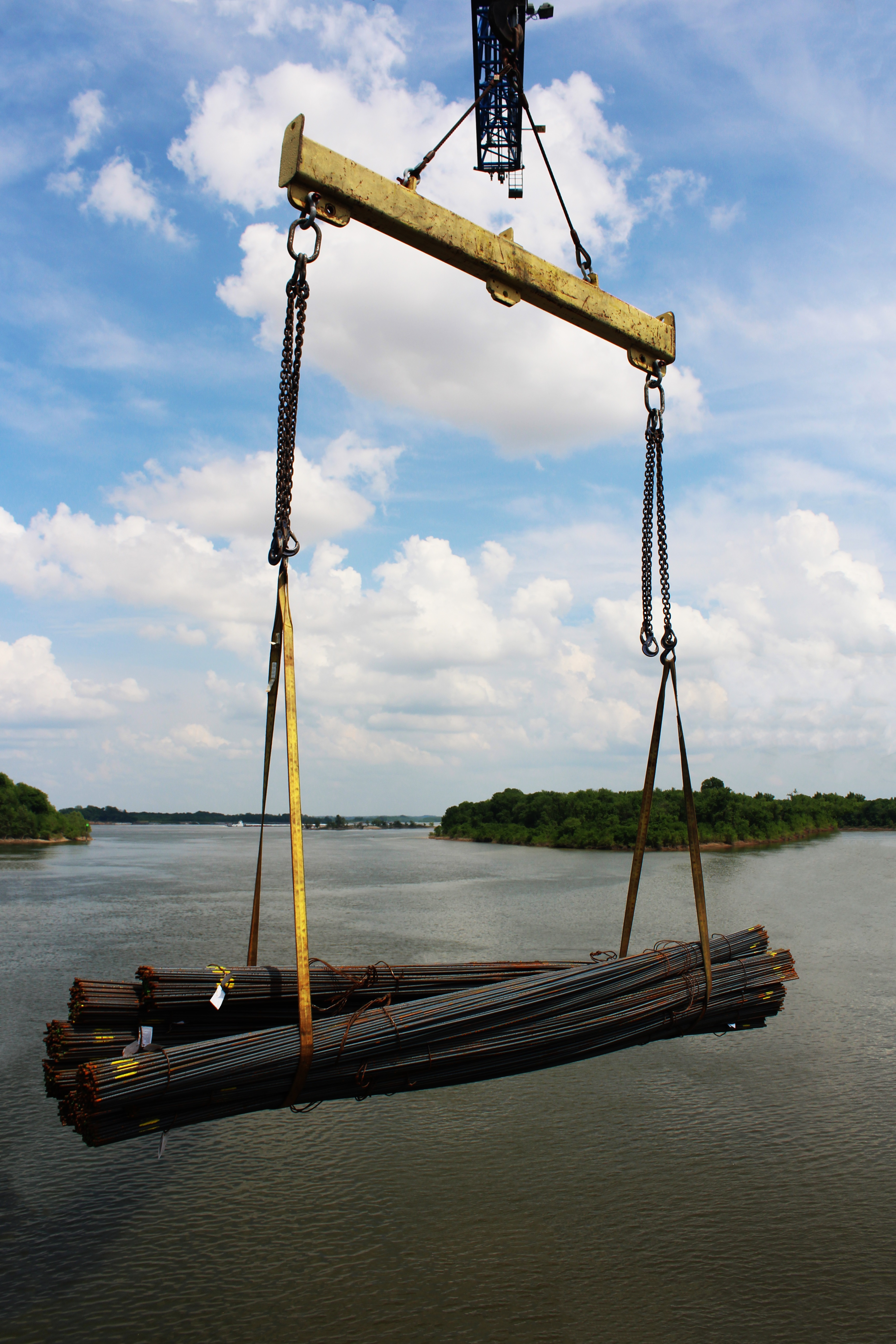
Rebar lifted by the Linden Comansa Crane at the Paducah-McCracken County Riverport Authority above the Tennessee River

The Paducah–McCracken County Riverport Authority has 48 total acres of space and 2,300 cumulative feet of river frontage on the banks of the Tennessee River. The Port boasts on-site warehouse capacity exceeding 14,000 tons, outside storage yards and complete fleeting and switching services are available. These features make Paducah an attractive – and economical – site for warehousing and distributing a wide variety of products.

- Multiple mooring facilities can simultaneously handle barges carrying different cargoes.
- Fully equipped for bulk, general, and containerized cargoes .
- Warehouse Capacities:
  - Bulk – 14,000-ton capacity
  - General Cargo – 70,000 sq. ft.
- Outside Storage:
  - 100,000 tons on 27 acres with room to expand.
- Packaging Capabilities:
  - Facilities and equipment for bagging, bundling, and repackaging.
- Around the clock switching service.

By way of the Mississippi River (M-55), freight can reach the blue water port of New Orleans, LA, or go north to access the Great Lakes (M-90) at Chicago, IL, and further on to Canada. From the Ohio River (M-70), you can reach the states Indiana, Ohio, Pennsylvania, and West Virginia. From the Tennessee-Tombigbee Waterway you can reach the blue water port of Mobile, AL. and from the Cumberland River, you can reach Nashville and Knoxville, TN. At any point, the freight can be removed from the waterway and put on other surface transportation modes – creating coast-to-coast access.

== Equipment ==
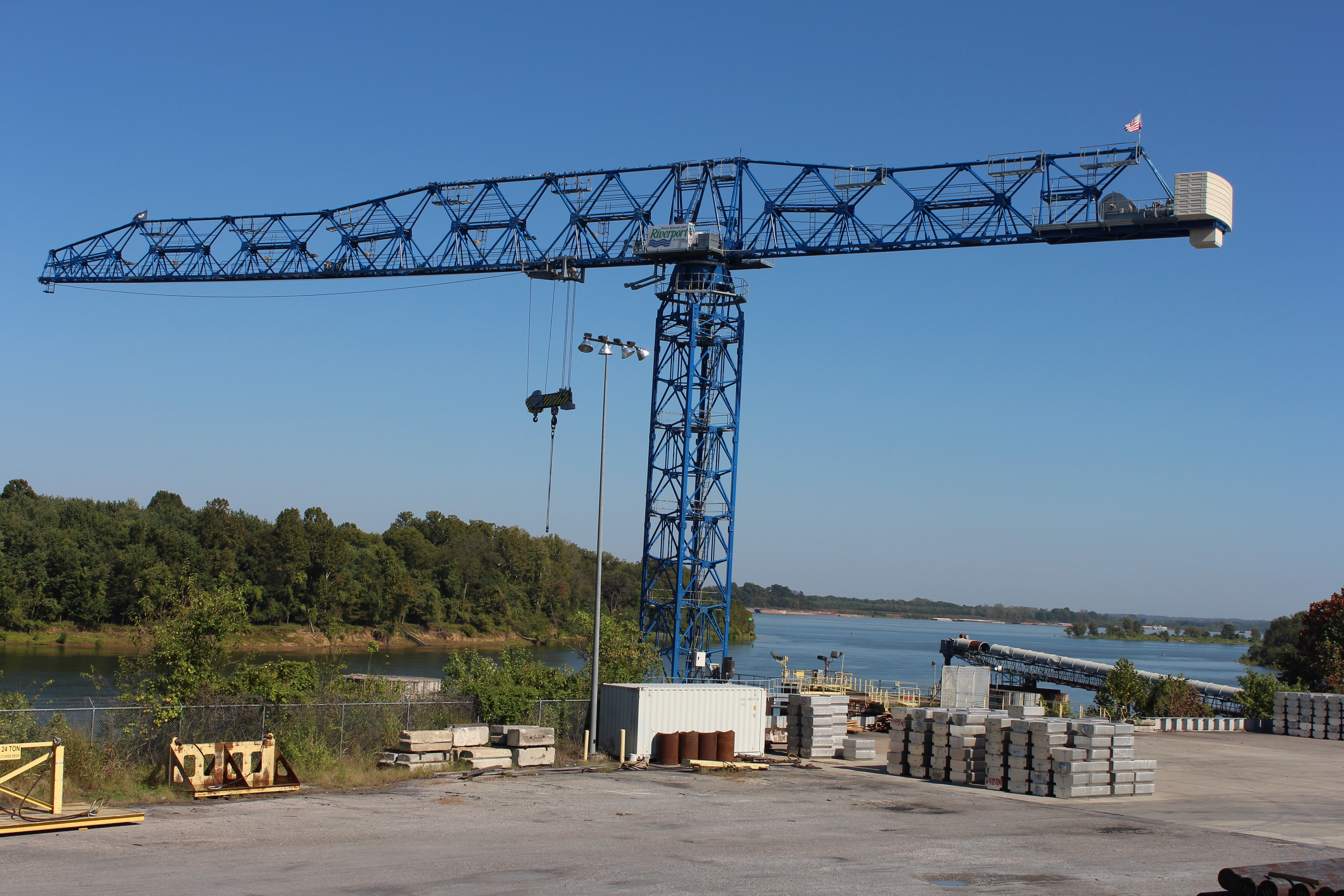
Largest Flat Top Crane in North America - Owned and Operated by the Paducah-McCracken County Riverport Authority

The Paducah–McCracken County Riverport Authority operates the largest flat top crane in North America - a 53-ton Linden Comansa 30LC 1450 flat top tower crane that sits on a 25,000 sq. ft. berth. The Linden Comansa flat top crane services the General Cargo Berth area.

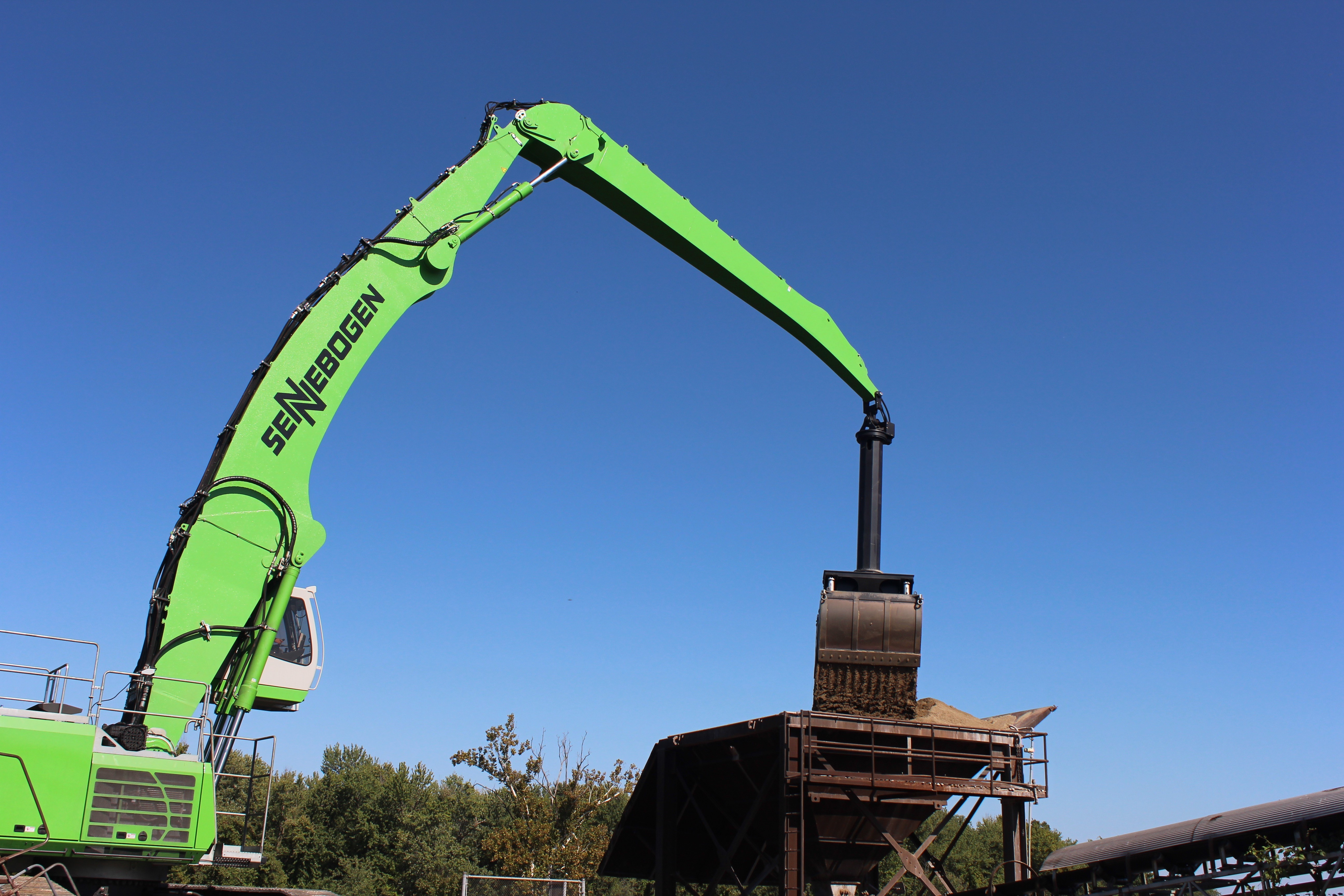
Sennebogen Material Handler purchased in 2017

The Paducah–McCracken County Riverport Authority purchased a new material handler in 2017 - an 870 R-HD Sennebogen. Among the newest of Sennebogen designs, the distinctive look of the 870 is notable for the massive “Green Hybrid” hydraulic cylinder mounted between its two main boom lift cylinders. The Green Hybrid system captures boom energy on every down movement of the boom and stores it safely in secure and protected containers at the rear of the machine. The energy is then released to assist the next lift of the boom. According to Sennebogen, this energy recovery process reduces the 870's fuel consumption by as much as 30 percent.

The Sennebogen material handler places bulk cargoes on a network of conveyors, which connects the bulk products to various warehouses and outdoor storage areas on Paducah–McCracken County Riverport Authority property. This conveyor system allows for loading bulk material directly into trucks for distribution throughout mid-America.
