= USS Peosta =

Gunboat of the United States Navy

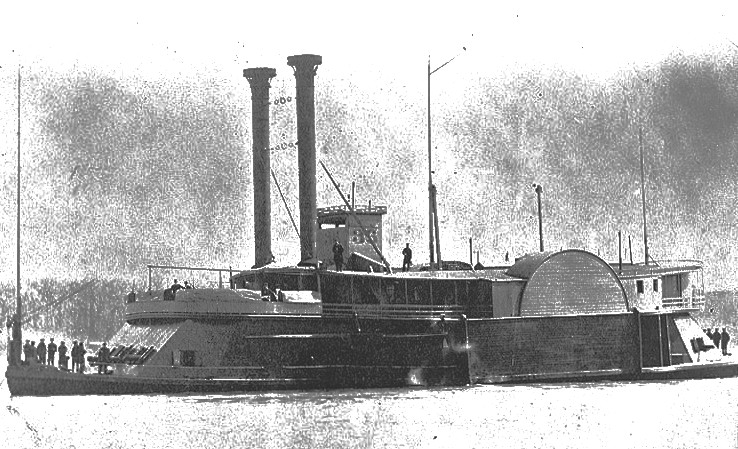
- USS Peosta photographed on the Western Rivers, during 1864-65. Note identification number "36" painted on her pilothouse.

History

United States
- Name: USS Peosta
- Completed: 1857
- Acquired: 13 June 1863
- Commissioned: 2 October 1863
- Decommissioned: 7 August 1865
- Fate: Sold, 17 August 1865

General characteristics
- Type: steamboat
- Tonnage: 204 tons
- Displacement: 233 tons
- Length: 151 ft 2 in (46.08 m)
- Beam: 34 ft 3 in (10.44 m)
- Draft: 6 ft (1.8 m)
- Depth of hold: 5 ft 2 in (1.57 m)
- Propulsion: steam engine, side-wheel propelled
- Armament: 3 × 30-pounder Parrott rifles; 3 × 32-pounder rifled guns; 2 × 12-pounder smoothbore guns; 6 × 24-pounder howitzers

USS Peosta—also known as "Tinclad" # 36—was a steamboat acquired by the Union Navy during the American Civil War. Peosta was outfitted as an armed gunboat, with heavy guns for battles at sea, and large howitzers for shore bombardment. She served on the rivers and other waterways of the Confederate States of America enforcing the Union blockade on the South.

== Service history ==
Peosta, a side-wheel wooden gunboat, was built in 1857 at Cincinnati, Ohio, for civilian employment. She was purchased at Dubuque, Iowa, 13 June 1863; fitted out at Cairo, Illinois, and commissioned 2 October 1863, Lt. Thomas E. Smith in command. Assigned to the Naval forces on the Tennessee River, Peosta departed Cairo 28 October and arrived at Paducah, Kentucky, 3 November. Remaining on the Tennessee River throughout the Civil War, she cruised between Paducah and Eastport, Mississippi, to protect Union shipping and support Union Army activities. In the spring of 1864 she assisted in halting a Confederate land and river offensive against Paducah as they moved through Union lines to repossess defenses along the river. On 25 March 1864, she engaged Confederate troops at Paducah. Remaining on the Tennessee River into June 1865 she arrived at Mound City, Illinois, on the 5th for inactivation. On 7 August 1865 she decommissioned and 10 days later was sold to John W. Waggoner. She retained her name in postwar merchant service and burned at Memphis, Tennessee, on 25 December 1870.

== See also ==
- Anaconda Plan
