= Fort Anderson (Kentucky) =

Coordinates: 37°05.580′N 88°36.121′W

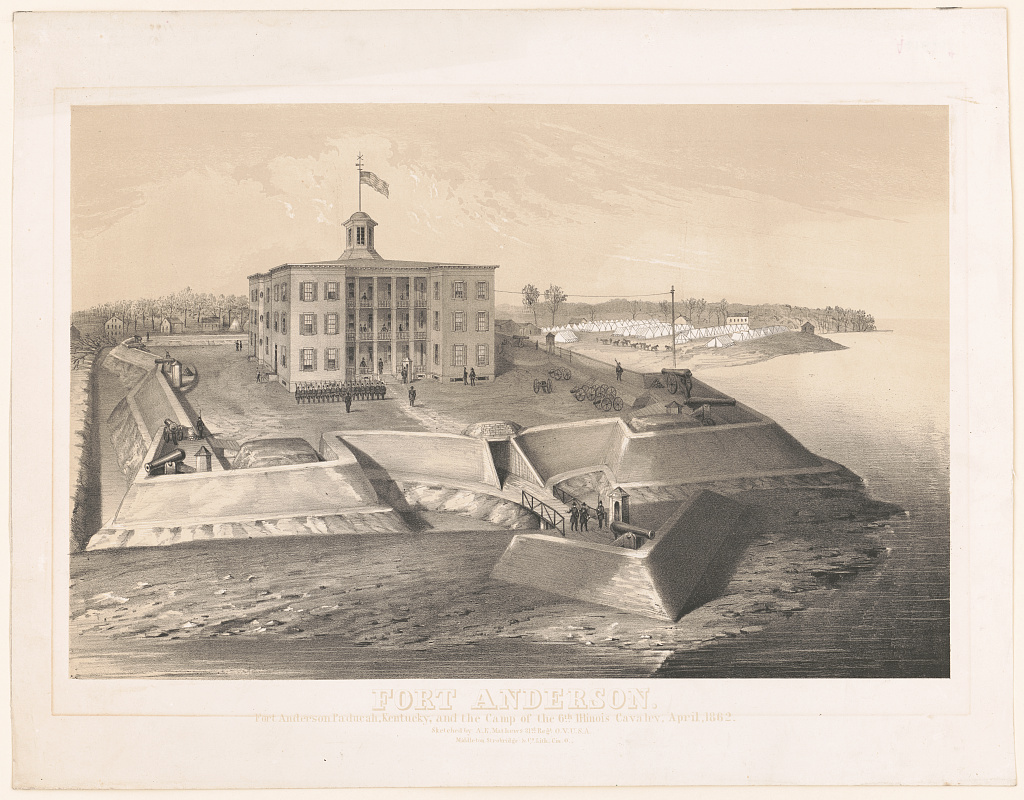
Fort Anderson painting by Alfred E. Matthews, showing the Marine Hospital building surrounded by the fort

Fort Anderson, in Paducah, Kentucky was the site of the Battle of Paducah.

== Marine Hospital ==
The site was originally the site of the Paducah U.S. Marine Hospital, which was funded by the federal Marine Hospital Fund primarily for the benefit of the civilian merchant marine. The building's construction was part of the hospital system's expansion to the "western waters" of the Mississippi River, Ohio River, and Great Lakes. The site was selected in 1842 and the building was constructed during 1849–1852. The building layout was based on the then-standard Marine Hospital plan by Robert Mills and Thomas Lawson. Stephen Harriman Long was in charge of its construction.

During the years of its operation it was only lightly used.

== Fort ==
Upon the outbreak of the American Civil War in 1861, the Union military took possession of the hospital and constructed Fort Anderson around it. The building itself burned down in 1862.

Originally a supply depot, it was rebuilt as a seven-gun fort. Fort Anderson was 400 feet long and ran 160 feet toward the Ohio River, surrounded on the west, north and south by 50 foot ditches filled with water. The fort was commanded by Colonel Stephen G. Hicks, a federal commander. The fort was occupied by 665 men, including Black soldiers of the 8th Regiment Heavy Artillery U.S. Colored Troops.

=== Battle of Paducah ===
In March 1864, Confederate Major-General Nathan Bedford Forrest set out from Columbus, Mississippi, with a force of less than 3,000 men on a multipurpose expedition (recruit, reoutfit, disperse Yankees, etc.) into West Tennessee and Kentucky. He arrived in Paducah on March 25, and quickly occupied the town. The cavalry began destroying unwanted supplies, and took what they wanted, mainly horses and mules.

Fort Anderson was commanded by Union officers Col. Stephen G. Hicks and Lt. Cdr. James W. Shirk. They had support of two gunboats on the Ohio River, and refused to surrender.

A message was sent by Forrest to Hicks asking for unconditional surrender. The letter reads as follows:

Colonel:
Having a force amply sufficient to carry your works and reduce the place, and in order to avoid the unnecessary effusion of blood, I demand the surrender of the fort and troops, with all public property. If you surrender, you shall be treated as a prisoner of war; but if I have to storm your works, you may expect no quarter.
N.B. Forrest,
Major-General, Commanding Confederate Troops.

Colonel Hicks answered with a letter of his own, which reads:

Sir:
I have this moment received yours of this instant, in which you demand the unconditional surrender of the forces under my command. I can answer that I have been placed here by the Government to defend this post, and in this, as well as all other orders from my superiors, I feel it to be my duty as an honorable officer to obey. I must, therefore, respectfully decline surrendering as you may require.
S.G. Hicks
Colonel, Commanding Post

As a result, on March 25, 1864, at 4:30, the order to charge came from Forrest. Led by Colonel Albert P. Thompson, of Paducah, the Confederate cavalrymen swooped down on the fort. They were met with a barrage of grapeshot and canister from newly converted gunboats. They fell back, and then charged once more, only to meet with the same fierce barrage. The Confederates entered homes near the fort and began firing under cover of the houses. General Forrest gave the order to cease firing.

Although this is considered to be a Confederate victory, it was not a conflict that made any lasting changes.

== Later history ==
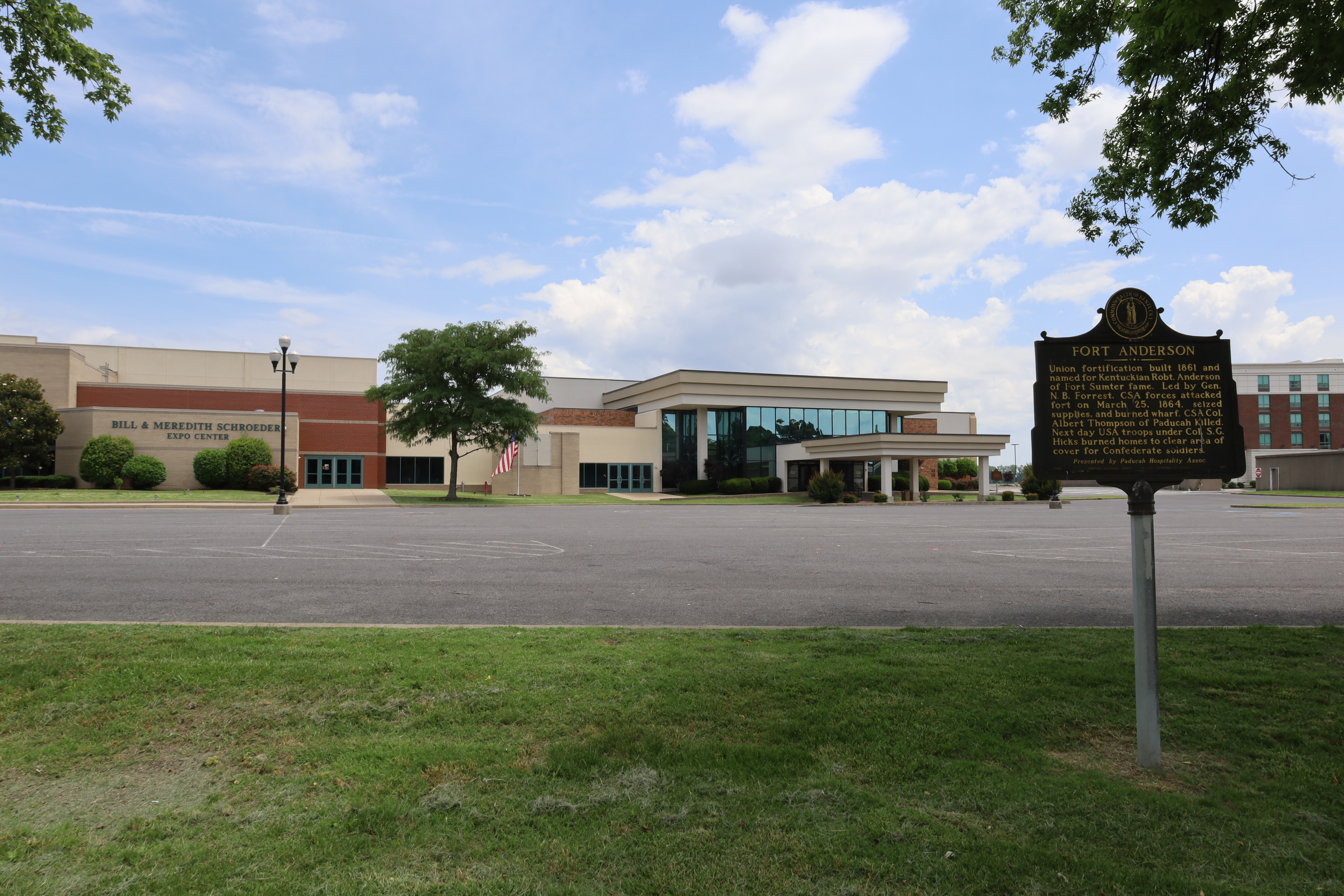
Paducah–McCracken County Convention & Expo Center with Fort Anderson historical marker in 2022

In 1905, Riverside Hospital opened on the site. Initially operated by the city, it was sold to the Catholic Diocese of Owensboro in 1959 and renamed Lourdes hospital. The hospital was sold in 1973 and became a nursing home.

The site is now occupied by the Paducah–McCracken County Convention & Expo Center.
