= Susan Bradley-Cox =

American triathlete

Susan Bradley-Cox (born November 9, 1937) is a triathlete from Paducah, Kentucky. She was named to the USA Triathlon Hall of Fame in 2011. In 1986, Bradley-Cox was 2nd at the Ironman World Championships. From 1989 to 2010, Bradley-Cox participated at the International Triathlon Union World championships. During these ITU championships, Bradley-Cox won 11 times and accumulated 18 medals. She won gold medals for the 50–54, 65–69, and 70–74 female age group. From 1997 to 1998, Bradley-Cox was chosen as the Athlete of the Year in the grand masters category by USA Triathlon.

In the US, Bradley-Cox earned 11 National Titles while racing at championships held by USA Triathlon. She has competed in over 200 triathlons since the beginning of her career in 1982. Bradley-Cox co-created the Susan Bradley-Cox Tri for Sight Triathlon. In 2014, Bradley-Cox was inducted into the Kentucky Sports Hall of Fame

For her coaching career, Bradley-Cox has worked in triathlon with the Kentucky Leukemia/Lymphoma Society and swimming with the Wildcat Masters. Bradley-Cox has been interviewed on the Champion of Active Women podcast as part of the Active Women's Health Initiative at the University of Kentucky.

== ITU World Championship race results ==
Source: Union, International Triathlon. "Triathlon.org". Triathlon.org.

Date	Pos	Event	Time
Sep 12, 2009	1	2009 Dextro Energy Triathlon – ITU World Championship Grand Final Gold Coast 70–74 Female AG	03:00:26
Sep 2, 2006	1	2006 Lausanne ITU Triathlon World Championships 65–69 Female AG	03:28:05
Oct 9, 2005	2	2005 Honolulu ITU Age Group Triathlon World Championships 65–69 Female AG	02:54:02
May 9, 2004	2	2004 Madeira ITU Triathlon World Championships 65–69 Female AG	03:12:15
Sep 15, 1990	4	1990 Orlando ITU Triathlon World Championships 50–54 Female AG	02:39:52
Aug 6, 1989	1	1989 Avignon ITU Triathlon World Championships 50–54 Female AG	02:37:18
