= Stephen G. Hicks =

American soldier

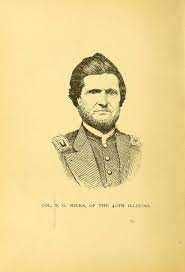

Stephen G. Hicks (February 22, 1809 – December 14, 1869 (or 1866)) was an American soldier born in Jackson County, Georgia. His father, John Hicks, was one of the seven soldiers killed in action at the Battle of New Orleans. Stephen Hicks served in the army during the Black Hawk War, Mexican War and Civil War.

== Career ==
During the American Civil War he enlisted in the 40th Illinois Infantry Regiment on July 22, 1861, and was honorably discharged on the July 24, 1865, at Louisville, Kentucky. In April 1862, he was wounded at the Battle of Shiloh. Because of this injury, he was deemed unfit for active duty and was instead appointed commander at Fort Anderson, Kentucky and took part in the Battle of Paducah in March 1864.

It was there, at Paducah, Kentucky, on March 25, that Confederate General Nathan Bedford Forrest unsuccessfully demanded Hicks' surrender:

... if I have to storm your works, you may expect no quarter.

Hicks courteously declined.

A bronze bas relief by Bruce Saville of Hicks can be found at Vicksburg National Military Park.

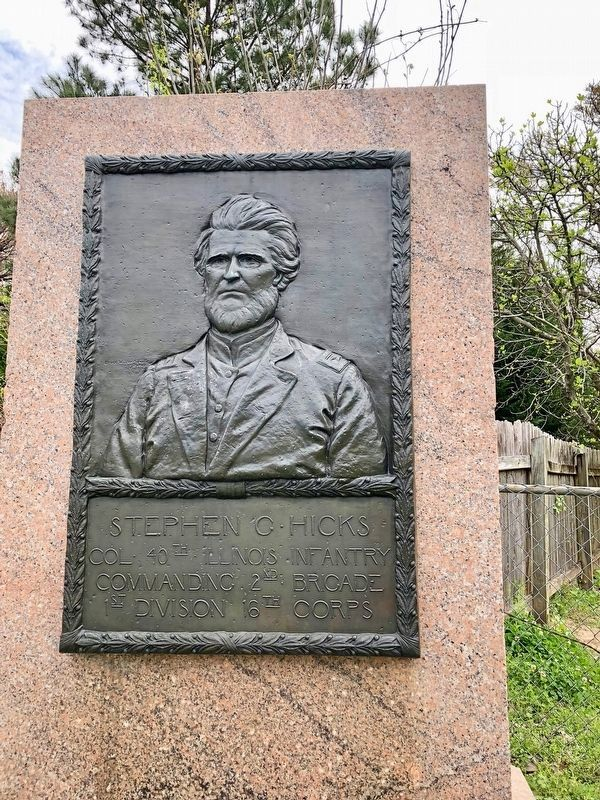
