= Paducah, Kentucky =

- City
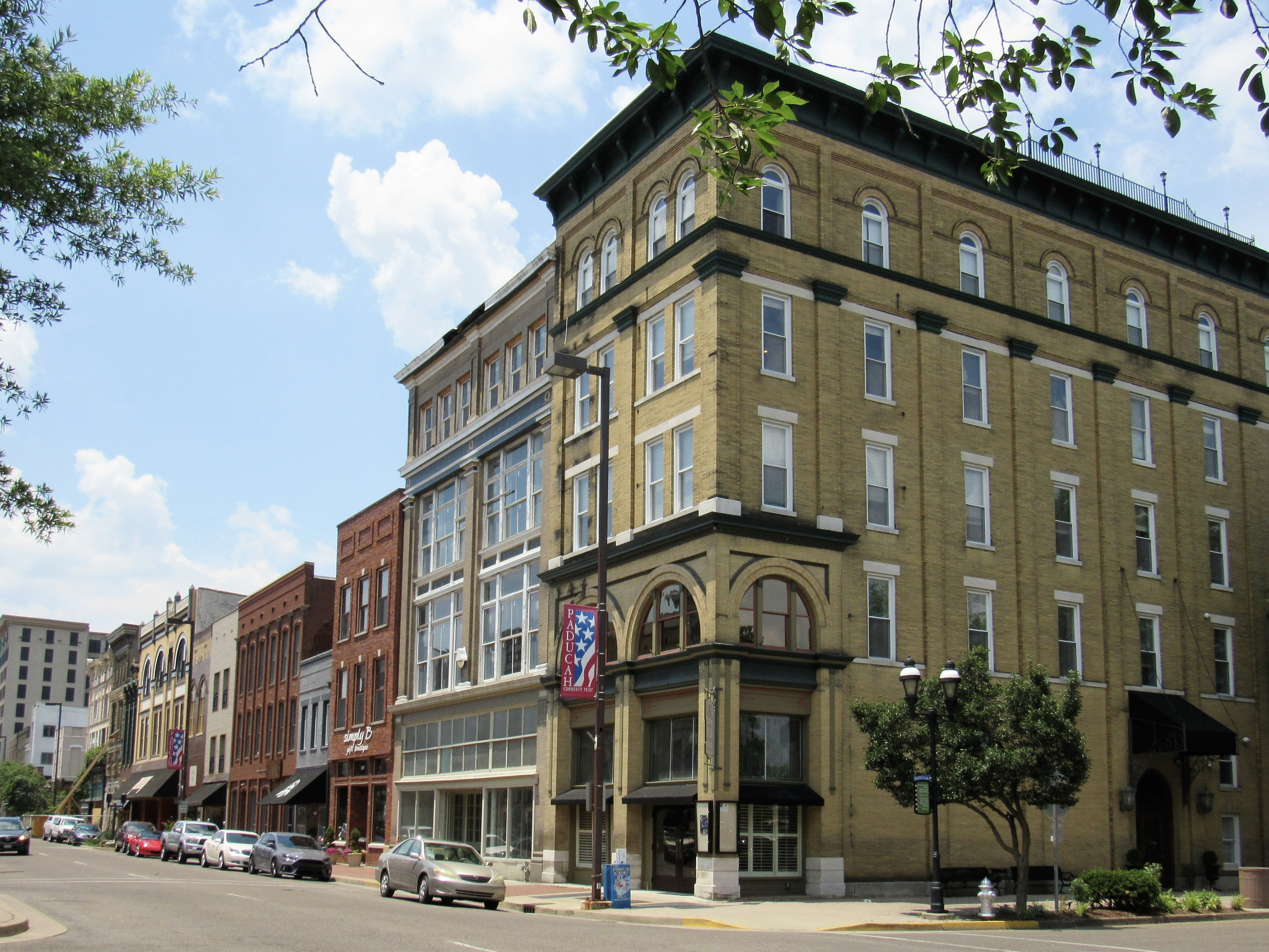
- Broadway, Paducah Downtown Commercial District

- Flag Seal
- Interactive map of Paducah, Kentucky
- Location within Kentucky Location within the United States
- Coordinates: 37°4′20″N 88°37′39″W
- Country: United States
- State: Kentucky
- County: McCracken
- Settled: c. 1821
- Established: 1830
- Incorporated: 1838
- Named for: the Chickasaw Tribe

Government
  - Type: City Manager
  - Mayor: George Bray
  - City Commissioners: Sandra Wilson. Raynarldo Henderson, Robert Smith, Dujuan Thomas

Area
  - City: 20.75 sq mi (53.74 km^{2})
  - Land: 20.31 sq mi (52.59 km^{2})
  - Water: 0.44 sq mi (1.15 km^{2})
- Elevation: 341 ft (104 m)

Population (2020)
  - City: 27,137
  - Estimate (2023): 27,205
  - Density: 1,336.6/sq mi (516.06/km^{2})
  - Metro: 103,481
- Demonym: Paducahan
- Time zone: UTC−6 (CST)
  - Summer (DST): UTC−5 (CDT)
- ZIP Code: 42001-42002-42003
- Area codes: 270 & 364
- FIPS code: 21-58836
- GNIS feature ID: 0500106
- Website: paducahky.gov

Paducah (/pəˈduːkə/ pə-DOO-kə) is a city in the Upland South and the county seat of McCracken County, Kentucky, United States. The most populous city in the Jackson Purchase region, it is located in the Southeastern United States at the confluence of the Tennessee and the Ohio rivers, halfway between St. Louis, Missouri, to the northwest and Nashville, Tennessee, to the southeast. As of the 2020 census, the population was 27,137, up from 25,024 in 2010. Twenty blocks of the city's downtown have been designated as a historic district and listed on the National Register of Historic Places.

Paducah is the principal city of the Paducah metropolitan area, which includes McCracken, Ballard, Carlisle and Livingston counties in Kentucky and Massac County in Illinois. The total population of the metro area was 103,481 in 2020. The Paducah–Mayfield combined statistical area had a total population of 140,138. Paducah is a home-rule class city under Kentucky law.

== History ==
=== Early history and etymology ===
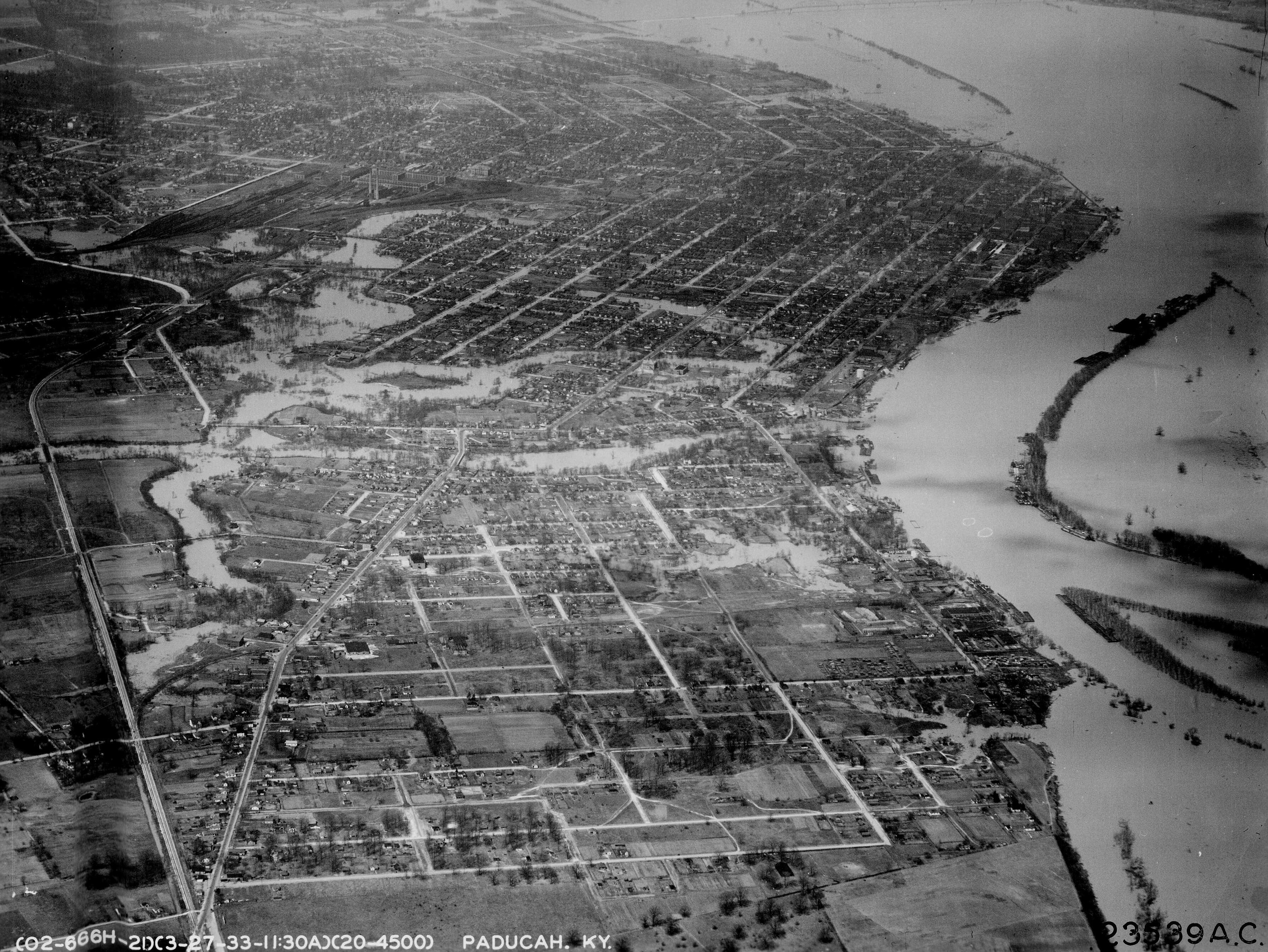
Paducah in 1933

Paducah was first settled as "Pekin" around 1821 by European Americans James and William Pore. The town was laid out by explorer and surveyor William Clark in 1827 and renamed Paducah.

Although local lore long connected this name to an eponymous Chickasaw chief "Paduke" and his band of "Paducahs", authorities on the Chickasaw have since said that there was never any chief or tribe of that name, or anything like it. The Chickasaw language does not have related words. Instead, historians believe that Clark named the town for the Comanche people of the western plains. They were known by regional settlers as the Padoucas, from a Spanish transliteration of the Kaw word Pádoka or the Omaha Pádoⁿka.

=== Incorporation, steamboats and railroads ===
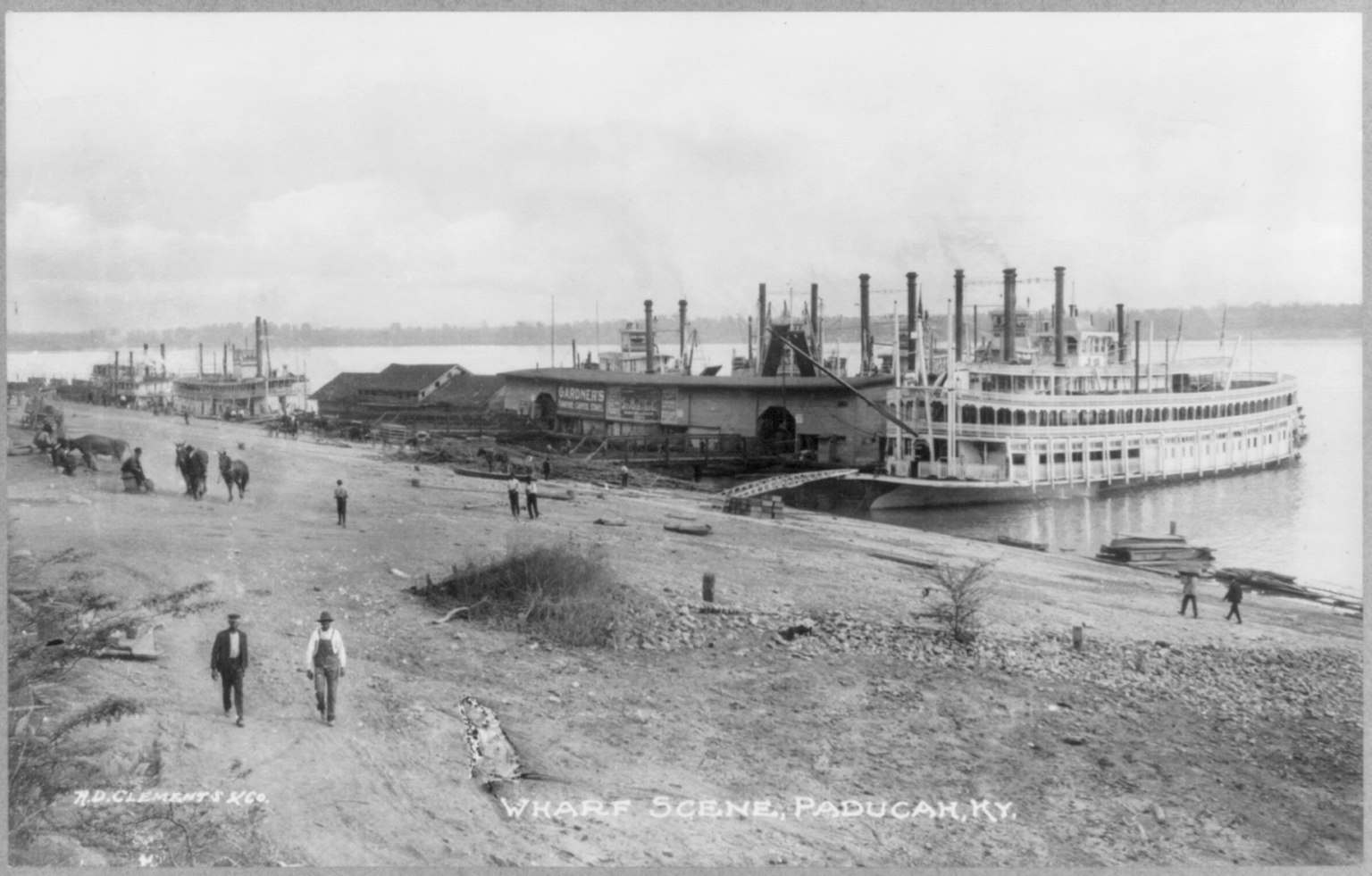
The wharf in Paducah, 1890

Paducah was formally established as a town in 1830 and incorporated as a city by the state legislature in 1838. The city charter was drafted by Quintus Quincy Quigley and H. Clay King in 1856.

By this time, steam boats traversed the river system, and its port facilities were important to trade and transportation. In addition, developing railroads began to enter the region. A factory for making red bricks, and a foundry for making rail and locomotive components became the nucleus of a thriving "River and Rail" economy. Paducah became the site of dry dock facilities for steamboats and towboats, and thus headquarters for many barge companies. Because of its proximity to coalfields further to the east in Kentucky and north in Illinois, Paducah also became an important railway hub for the Illinois Central Railroad. This was the primary north–south railway connecting the industrial cities of Chicago and East St. Louis to the Gulf of Mexico at Gulfport, Mississippi, and New Orleans, Louisiana. The Illinois Central system also provided east–west links to the Burlington Northern and the Atchison, Topeka, and Santa Fe Railways (which later merged to become the BNSF Railway).

In 1924 the Illinois Central Railroad began construction at Paducah of their largest locomotive workshop in the nation. Over a period of 190 days, a large ravine between Washington and Jones streets was filled with 44,560 carloads of dirt to enlarge the site, sufficient for the construction of 23 buildings. The eleven million dollar project was completed in 1927 as the fourth-largest industrial plant in Kentucky. The railroad became the largest employer in Paducah, having 1,075 employees in 1938.

As steam locomotives were replaced through the 1940s and 1950s, the Paducah shops were converted to maintain diesel locomotives. A nationally known rebuilding program for aging diesel locomotives from Illinois Central and other railroads began in 1967. The shops became part of the Paducah and Louisville Railway in 1986. In the early 21st century, they are operated by VMV Paducahbilt.

=== Civil War ===
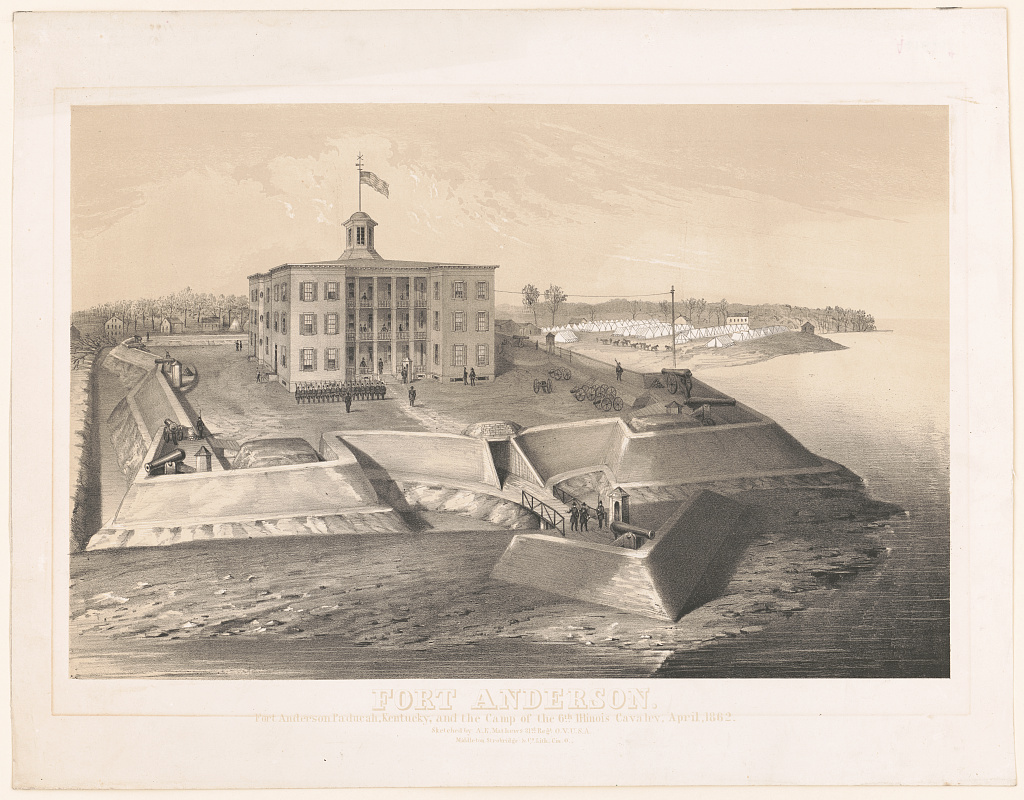
Fort Anderson was the site of the Battle of Paducah in March 1864.

At the outset of the Civil War, Kentucky attempted to take a neutral position. However, when a Confederate force occupied Columbus, a Union force under General Ulysses S. Grant responded by occupying Paducah. Throughout most of the war, Col. Stephen G. Hicks was in charge of Paducah, and the town served as a massive supply depot for Federal forces along the Ohio, Mississippi, and Tennessee river systems.

On December 17, 1862, under the terms of General Order No. 11, US forces required 30 Jewish families to leave their long-established homes. Grant was trying to break up a black market in cotton, in which he assumed Jewish traders were involved due to racial stereotyping associated with antisemitic tropes. Cesar Kaskel, a prominent local Jewish businessman, dispatched a telegram of complaint to President Lincoln and met with him. As there were similar actions taken by other Jewish businessmen and loud complaints by Congress about the treatment of their constituents, Lincoln ordered the policy to be revoked within a few weeks.

On March 25, 1864, Confederate Gen. Nathan Bedford Forrest raided Paducah as part of his campaign northward from Mississippi into Western Tennessee and Kentucky. He intended to re-supply the Confederate forces in the region with recruits, ammunition, medical supplies, horses and mules, and especially to disrupt the Union domination of the regions south of the Ohio River. Known as the Battle of Paducah, the raid was successful in terms of the re-supply effort and in intimidating the Union, but Forrest returned south. According to his report, "I drove the enemy to their gunboats and fort; and held the city for ten hours, captured many stores and horses; burned sixty bales of cotton, one steamer, and a drydock, bringing out fifty prisoners." Much of the fighting took place around Fort Anderson on the city's west side, in the present-day Lower Town neighborhood; most buildings in the neighborhood postdate the war, as most of the neighborhood was demolished soon after the battle to deny any future raids the advantage of surprise that they had enjoyed during the battle. Among the few houses that were not destroyed is the David Yeiser House, a single-story Greek Revival structure.

Later having read in the newspapers that 140 fine horses had escaped the raid, Forrest sent Brigadier General Abraham Buford back to Paducah, to get the horses and to keep Union forces busy there while he attacked Fort Pillow in Tennessee. His forces were charged with a massacre of United States Colored Troops among the Union forces whom they defeated at the fort. On April 14, 1864, Buford's men found the horses hidden in a Paducah foundry, as reported by the newspapers. Buford rejoined Forrest with the spoils, leaving the Union in control of Paducah until the end of the War.

=== 1937 flood ===
1884 flood

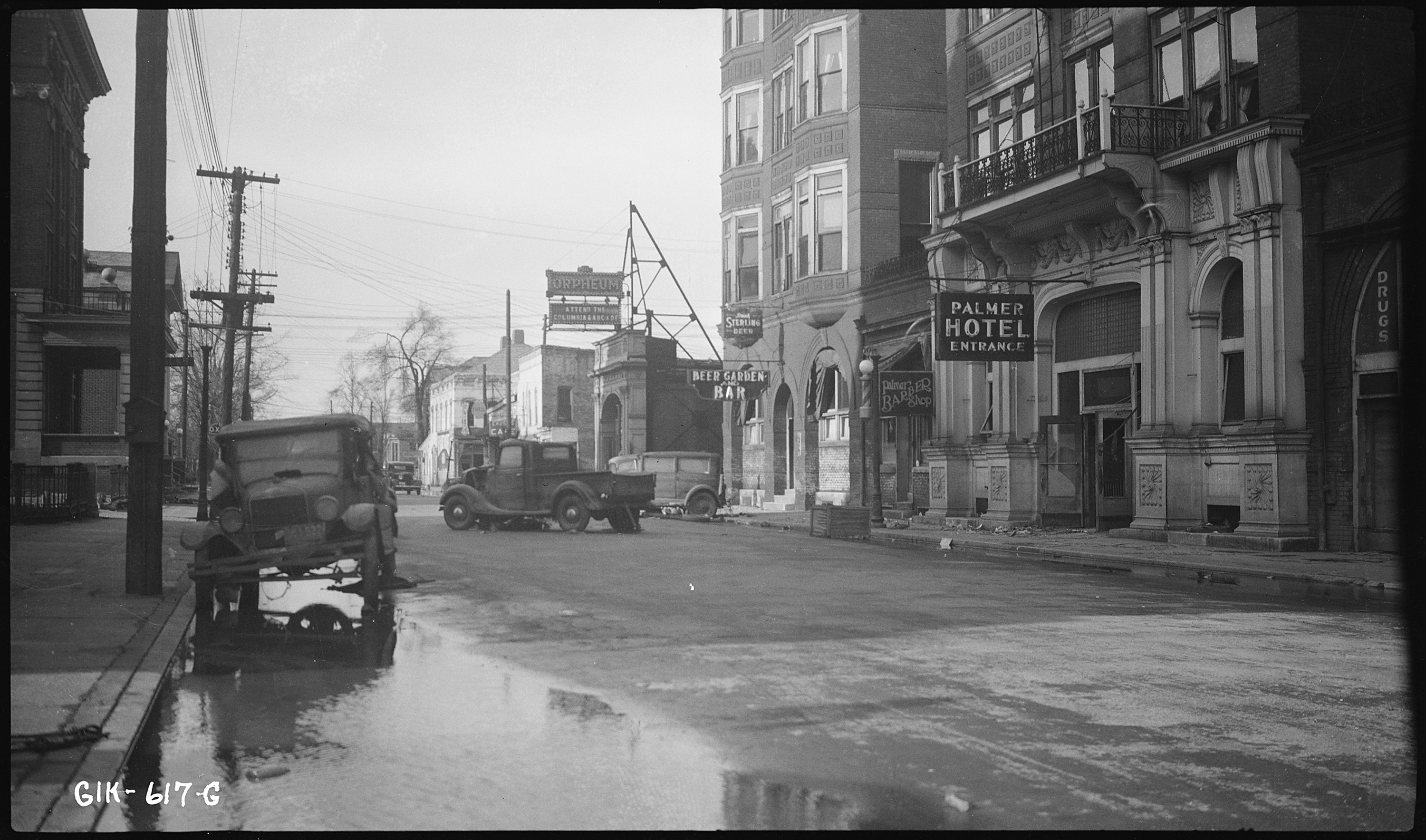
Downtown Paducah in the aftermath of the 1937 flood

In a far-reaching flood, on January 21, 1937, the Ohio River at Paducah rose above its 50-foot (15 m) flood stage, cresting at 60.8 feet (18.5 m) on February 2 and receding again to 50 feet on February 15. For nearly three weeks, 27,000 residents were forced to flee or to stay with friends and relatives on higher ground in McCracken or other counties. The American Red Cross and local churches provided some shelters. Buildings in downtown Paducah still bear historic plaques that define the high water marks.

Driven by 18 inches (460 mm) of rainfall in 16 days, along with sheets of swiftly moving ice, the Ohio River flood of 1937 was the worst natural disaster in Paducah's history and elsewhere in the Ohio Valley. The earthen levee was ineffective against this flood. As a result, Congress authorized the United States Army Corps of Engineers to build the flood wall that now protects the city.

=== Quilt City ===
On April 25, 1991, the National Quilt Museum opened in downtown Paducah. Paducah has been part of the UNESCO Creative Cities Network in the category of craft and folk art since November 2013. The national quilt show takes place yearly at the Schroeder Expo Center. The American Quilter's Society hosts a week of quilt shows with quilt classes, fabric shops and a variety of vendors. They host a variety of award-winning quilts from across the country. The show features exhibits that include hand pieced and appliqued quilts, Kentucky heritage quilts, and Paducah contest quilts.

=== The Heath shooting ===
On December 1, 1997, 14-year-old Michael Carneal brought five loaded guns to Heath High School and shot a group of fellow students in the school's lobby as they were leaving a prayer group before school. Three students, all girls, were killed and five others were wounded; one of the wounded was left a paraplegic. Carneal subsequently received a sentence of life with the possibility of parole after 25 years. In 2022, the Kentucky Parole Board denied his bid for parole.

== Geography ==
According to the United States Census Bureau, the city has a total area of 20.0 square miles (52 km^{2}), of which 19.9 square miles (52 km^{2}) is land and 0.10 square miles (0.26 km^{2}), comprising 0.52%, is water.

=== Climate ===
Paducah has a humid subtropical climate (Köppen: Cfa) with four distinct seasons and is located in USDA hardiness zone 7a. Spring-like conditions typically begin in mid-to-late March, summer from mid-to-late-May to late September, with fall in the October–November period. Seasonal extremes in both temperature and precipitation are common during early spring and late fall; severe weather is also common, with occasional tornado outbreaks in the region. Winter typically brings a mix of rain, sleet, and snow, with occasional heavy snowfall and icing. The city has a normal January mean temperature of 34.6 °F (1.4 °C) and averages 13 days annually with temperatures staying at or below freezing; the first and last freezes of the season on average fall on October 25 and April 8, respectively. Summer is typically hazy, hot, and humid with a July daily average of 78.9 °F (26.1 °C) and drought conditions at times. Paducah averages 48 days a year with high temperatures at or above 90 °F (32 °C). Snowfall averages 8.9 inches (23 cm) per season, contributing to the average annual precipitation of 50.32 inches (1,280 mm). Extremes in temperature range from 108 °F (42 °C) on July 17, 1942, and June 29, 2012, down to −15 °F (−26 °C) on January 20, 1985. Paducah is prone to river flooding from the Ohio River, and as of late February 2018, the river had been expected to crest at 49 feet on February 28.

Climate data for Paducah, Kentucky (Barkley Regional Airport), 1991–2020 normals, extremes 1937–present
Month	Jan	Feb	Mar	Apr	May	Jun	Jul	Aug	Sep	Oct	Nov	Dec	Year
Record high °F (°C)	77 (25)	78 (26)	85 (29)	90 (32)	96 (36)	108 (42)	108 (42)	106 (41)	104 (40)	96 (36)	86 (30)	77 (25)	108 (42)
Mean maximum °F (°C)	65.4 (18.6)	70.7 (21.5)	77.9 (25.5)	84.0 (28.9)	89.6 (32.0)	95.0 (35.0)	96.9 (36.1)	96.4 (35.8)	93.4 (34.1)	86.5 (30.3)	76.0 (24.4)	67.0 (19.4)	98.4 (36.9)
Mean daily maximum °F (°C)	44.7 (7.1)	49.7 (9.8)	59.7 (15.4)	70.4 (21.3)	79.1 (26.2)	87.1 (30.6)	89.9 (32.2)	89.5 (31.9)	83.2 (28.4)	71.8 (22.1)	58.5 (14.7)	48.3 (9.1)	69.3 (20.7)
Daily mean °F (°C)	36.0 (2.2)	40.1 (4.5)	49.0 (9.4)	59.0 (15.0)	68.4 (20.2)	76.5 (24.7)	79.7 (26.5)	78.2 (25.7)	71.0 (21.7)	59.7 (15.4)	48.0 (8.9)	39.5 (4.2)	58.8 (14.9)
Mean daily minimum °F (°C)	27.3 (−2.6)	30.5 (−0.8)	38.3 (3.5)	47.6 (8.7)	57.7 (14.3)	66.0 (18.9)	69.4 (20.8)	66.8 (19.3)	58.9 (14.9)	47.6 (8.7)	37.5 (3.1)	30.7 (−0.7)	48.2 (9.0)
Mean minimum °F (°C)	7.9 (−13.4)	11.6 (−11.3)	19.1 (−7.2)	30.6 (−0.8)	41.6 (5.3)	53.2 (11.8)	58.8 (14.9)	55.7 (13.2)	43.0 (6.1)	30.4 (−0.9)	21.0 (−6.1)	12.7 (−10.7)	4.0 (−15.6)
Record low °F (°C)	−15 (−26)	−14 (−26)	−6 (−21)	21 (−6)	32 (0)	44 (7)	47 (8)	44 (7)	34 (1)	22 (−6)	−3 (−19)	−10 (−23)	−15 (−26)
Average precipitation inches (mm)	3.85 (98)	3.94 (100)	4.64 (118)	5.17 (131)	4.87 (124)	4.51 (115)	4.30 (109)	3.11 (79)	3.55 (90)	3.99 (101)	4.09 (104)	4.30 (109)	50.32 (1,278)
Average snowfall inches (cm)	2.7 (6.9)	3.0 (7.6)	1.1 (2.8)	0.0 (0.0)	0.0 (0.0)	0.0 (0.0)	0.0 (0.0)	0.0 (0.0)	0.0 (0.0)	0.1 (0.25)	0.2 (0.51)	1.8 (4.6)	8.9 (23)
Average precipitation days (≥ 0.01 in)	10.4	9.3	11.2	11.1	11.5	9.4	8.7	7.6	6.9	8.0	9.5	10.2	113.8
Average snowy days (≥ 0.1 in)	2.3	2.1	0.9	0.0	0.0	0.0	0.0	0.0	0.0	0.1	0.3	1.3	7.0
Source: NOAA

== Demographics ==
Historical population
Census	Pop.	Note	%±
1830	105		—
1850	2,428		—
1860	4,590		89.0%
1870	6,866		49.6%
1880	8,036		17.0%
1890	12,797		59.2%
1900	19,446		52.0%
1910	22,760		17.0%
1920	24,735		8.7%
1930	33,541		35.6%
1940	33,765		0.7%
1950	32,828		−2.8%
1960	34,479		5.0%
1970	31,627		−8.3%
1980	29,315		−7.3%
1990	27,256		−7.0%
2000	26,307		−3.5%
2010	25,024		−4.9%
2020	27,137		8.4%
2025 (est.)	26,730		−1.5%
U.S. Decennial Census

=== 2020 census ===
As of the 2020 census, Paducah had a population of 27,137. The median age was 40.0 years. 21.6% of residents were under the age of 18 and 18.8% of residents were 65 years of age or older. For every 100 females there were 88.6 males, and for every 100 females age 18 and over there were 85.4 males age 18 and over.

99.5% of residents lived in urban areas, while 0.5% lived in rural areas.

There were 11,779 households in Paducah, of which 5,561 were families. 26.8% had children under the age of 18 living in them. Of all households, 31.3% were married-couple households, 21.4% were households with a male householder and no spouse or partner present, and 40.4% were households with a female householder and no spouse or partner present. About 40.4% of all households were made up of individuals and 16.0% had someone living alone who was 65 years of age or older.

There were 13,193 housing units, of which 10.7% were vacant. The homeowner vacancy rate was 2.9% and the rental vacancy rate was 7.1%.

Racial composition as of the 2020 census
Race	Number	Percent
White	18,376	64.7%
Black or African American	10,014	35.2%
American Indian and Alaska Native	120	0.4%
Asian	276	1.0%
Native Hawaiian and Other Pacific Islander	11	0.0%
Some other race	504	1.9%
Two or more races	1,836	6.8%
Hispanic or Latino (of any race)	1,047	3.9%

=== 2010 census ===
As of the census of 2010, there were 25,024 people, 11,462 households, and 6,071 families residing in the city. The population density was 1,251.0 inhabitants per square mile (483.0/km^{2}). There were 12,851 housing units at an average density of 642.5 per square mile (248.1/km^{2}). The racial makeup of the city was 70.99% White, 23.67% African American, 0.22% Native American, 1.02% Asian, 0.02% Pacific Islander, 1.07% from other races, and 3.01% from two or more races. Hispanics or Latinos of any race were 2.68% of the population.

There were 11,462 households, out of which 26.1% had children under the age of 18 living with them, 32.5% were married couples living together, 16.4% had a female householder with no husband present, 4.0% had a male householder with no wife present, and 47.0% were non-families. 41.5% of all households were made up of individuals, and 15.7% had someone living alone who was 65 years of age or older. The average household size was 2.09 and the average family size was 2.84.

In the city, the population was spread out, with 21.8% under the age of 18, 8.0% from 18 to 24, 24.4% from 25 to 44, 27.7% from 45 to 64, and 18.2% who were 65 or older. The median age was 41.4 years. For every 100 females, there were 85.2 males. For every 100 females age 18 and over, there were 81.2 males.

The median income for a household in the city was $31,220, and the median income for a family was $42,645. Males had a median income of $36,778 versus $27,597 for females. The per capita income for the city was $20,430. About 18.1% of families and 22.0% of the population were below the poverty line, including 34.3% of those under age 18 and 12.8% of those age 65 or over.

=== 2000 census ===
As of the census of 2000, there were 26,307 people, 11,825 households, and 6,645 families residing in the city. The population density was 1,350.2 inhabitants per square mile (521.3/km^{2}). There were 13,221 housing units at an average density of 678.6 per square mile (262.0/km^{2}). The racial makeup of the city was 72.78% White, 24.15% African American, 0.25% Native American, 0.64% Asian, 0.08% Pacific Islander, 0.55% from other races, and 1.56% from two or more races. Hispanic or Latino of any race were 1.38% of the population.

There were 11,825 households, out of which 25.0% had children under the age of 18 living with them, 36.8% were married couples living together, 16.2% had a female householder with no husband present, and 43.8% were non-families. 39.3% of all households were made up of individuals, and 17.3% had someone living alone who was 65 years of age or older. The average household size was 2.12 and the average family size was 2.84.

In the city the population was spread out, with 22.5% under the age of 18, 8.5% from 18 to 24, 26.2% from 25 to 44, 22.5% from 45 to 64, and 20.3% who were 65 years of age or older. The median age was 40 years. For every 100 females, there were 83.4 males. For every 100 females age 18 and over, there were 77.9 males.

The median income for a household in the city was $26,137, and the median income for a family was $34,092. Males had a median income of $32,783 versus $21,901 for females. The per capita income for the city was $18,417. About 18.0% of families and 22.4% of the population were below the poverty line, including 33.8% of those under age 18 and 16.8% of those age 65 or over.

== Economy ==
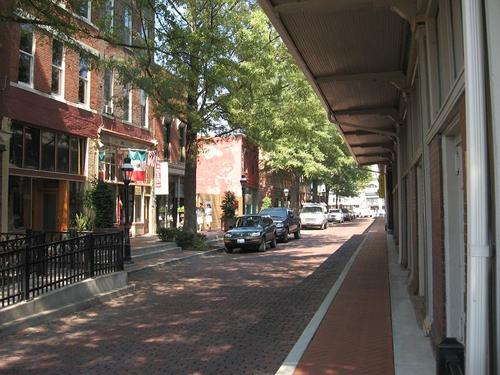
Downtown Paducah

Dippin' Dots, the Paducah & Louisville Railway and several barge companies have their headquarters in Paducah.

The river continues to be a prominent source of industry for Paducah. Twenty-three barge companies have their operating or corporate headquarters in Paducah. In 2017, the city of Paducah opened a 340-foot (100 m) transient boat dock that provides space for transient boaters to tie up for a few hours or several nights, increasing tourism in the city. Amenities include fuel (diesel and marine grade gasoline), water, power pedestals, and a sewer pumpout station (seasonal for water and sewer amenities). A federal National Weather Service Forecast Office is based in Paducah, providing weather information to western Kentucky, western Tennessee, southeastern Missouri, southern Illinois, and southwestern Indiana.

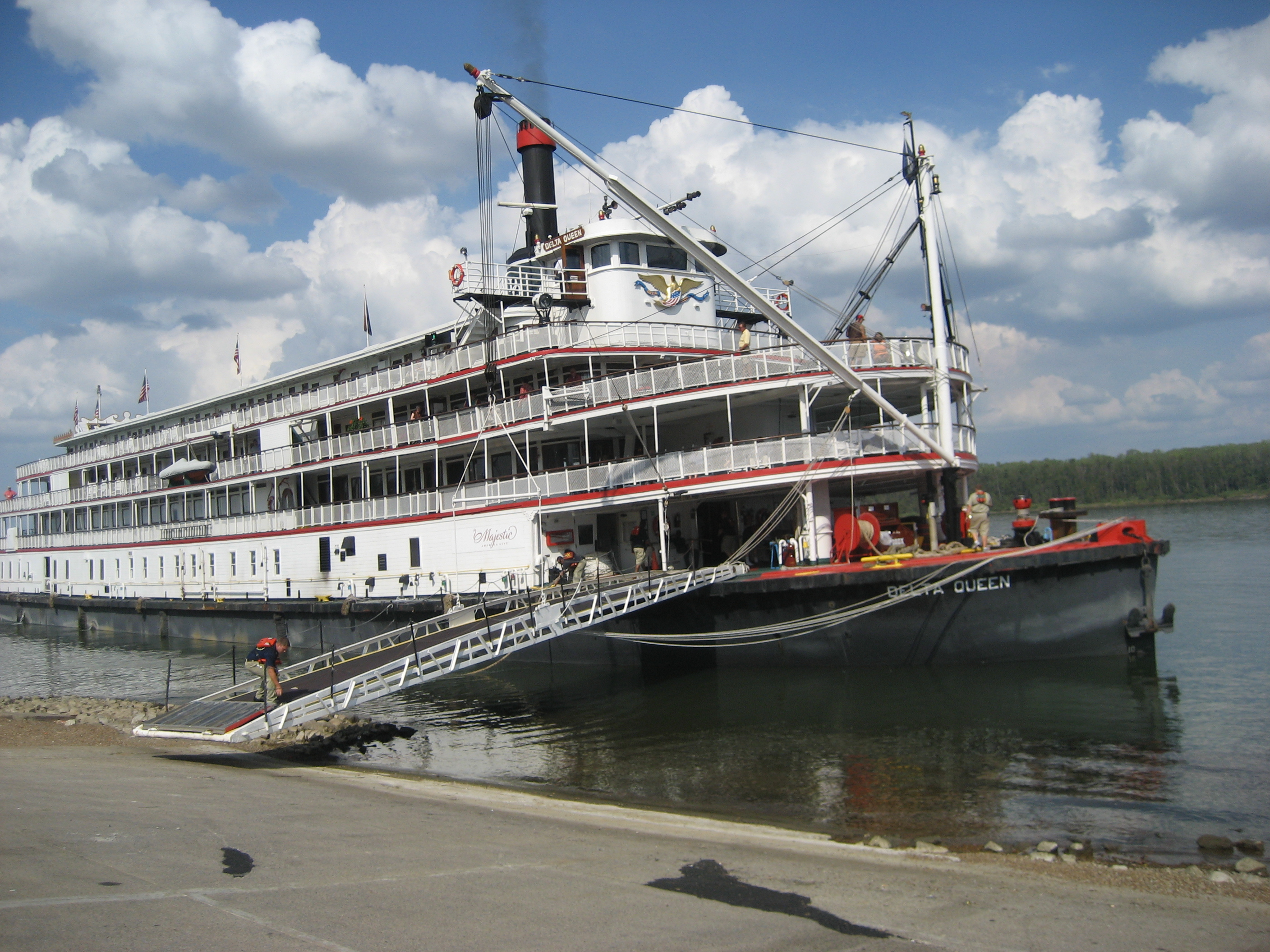
The Delta Queen in Paducah

In the early 2020s, cryptocurrency mining companies also established operations in the Paducah area. Blockware Mining announced plans for a cryptocurrency mining facility in Paducah and received state tax incentives for the proposed project.

=== Enrichment uranium facility ===
In 1950, the U.S. Atomic Energy Commission selected Paducah as the site for a new uranium enrichment plant. Construction began in 1951 and the plant opened for operations in 1952. Originally operated by Union Carbide, the plant has changed hands several times. Martin Marietta, its successor company Lockheed-Martin, and now the United States Enrichment Corporation have operated the plant in turn. The U.S. Department of Energy (DOE), successor to the AEC, remains the owner. The plant was closed in June 2013, and the Department of Energy began the process of decontaminating and shutting down the facilities.

In August 2025, General Matter, an American uranium enrichment company, signed a lease with the U.S. Department of Energy (DOE) for the former Paducah Gaseous Diffusion Plant. Plans for the $1.5 billion updated facility include uranium enrichment technology for the production of fuel needed for the next generation of nuclear energy, which are vital for future growth of manufacturing, artificial intelligence and other key industries.

In January 2026, General Matter received a $900 million contract from the U.S. Department of Energy for reshoring to produce American enriched uranium.

In March 2026, Global Laser Enrichment (GLE), announced a $1.76 Billion Project to develop the Paducah Laser Enrichment Facility (PLEF) which will re-enrich more than 200,000 metric tons of depleted uranium at the site under contract with the U.S. Department of Energy (DOE). The DOE also awarded Global Laser Enrichment $28.5 million for the project, which will occupy a 665-acre site adjacent to the gaseous diffusion plant.

=== AI data center campus ===
In July 2026, a consortium led by Brookfield Asset Management and NextEra Energy announced plans to develop a $100 billion privately funded investment over time in a new AI data center and energy campus at the former Paducah Gaseous Diffusion Plant site. The project will transform part of the former DOE uranium enrichment complex into one of the largest AI computing campuses in the United States. The full build-out of the AI Campus is expected by 2032, with the first phases expected to come online around 2028. Approximately 8,000 construction jobs during the build-out process, with around 600 permanent operations jobs once the campus is fully operational.

=== Top employers ===
According to Paducah's 2023 Comprehensive Annual Financial Report, the top employers in the city were entities in healthcare and education services:

#	Employer	# of Employees
1	Bon Secours Mercy Health, Inc.	1,445
2	Baptist Healthcare Systems	1,432
3	Wal-Mart Associates, Inc.	969
4	Paducah Board of Education	623
5	Baptist Health Medical Group	410
6	City of Paducah	339
7	West Kentucky Community & Technical College	376
8	ViWinTech Window & Door	370
9	Lowes of Paducah No. 465	329
10	GMRI	319

Several employers in McCracken County call Paducah home, although their facilities are located outside the city limits. Paducah and McCracken County jointly operate Greater Paducah Economic Development ("GPED"). GPED lists the top employers in McCracken County, several of which include employers within the City of Paducah limits, and is more reflective of the true top employer situation as perceived by citizens of Paducah, as:

#	Employer	Product/service
1	Baptist Health Paducah	Healthcare
2	Mercy Health-Lourdes	Healthcare
3	Four Rivers Nuclear Partnership	Clean-up contractor-gaseous diffusion plant
4	James Marine	Inland marine/barge manufacturing
5	McCracken County Public Schools	K–12 education
6	Marquette Transportation	Marine transportation/HQ
7	Walmart	Retail
8	Beltline Electric	Electrical Contractor
9	City of Paducah	Government
10	Computer Services, Inc.	Bank Processing
11	Credit Bureau Systems	Credit reporting
12	Independence Bank	Banking
13	Ingram Barge	Inland marine
14	Lowes	Retail
15	Lynx Services	Call center
16	Paducah Public Schools	K–12 education

== Arts and culture ==
=== Art ===
==== Murals ====
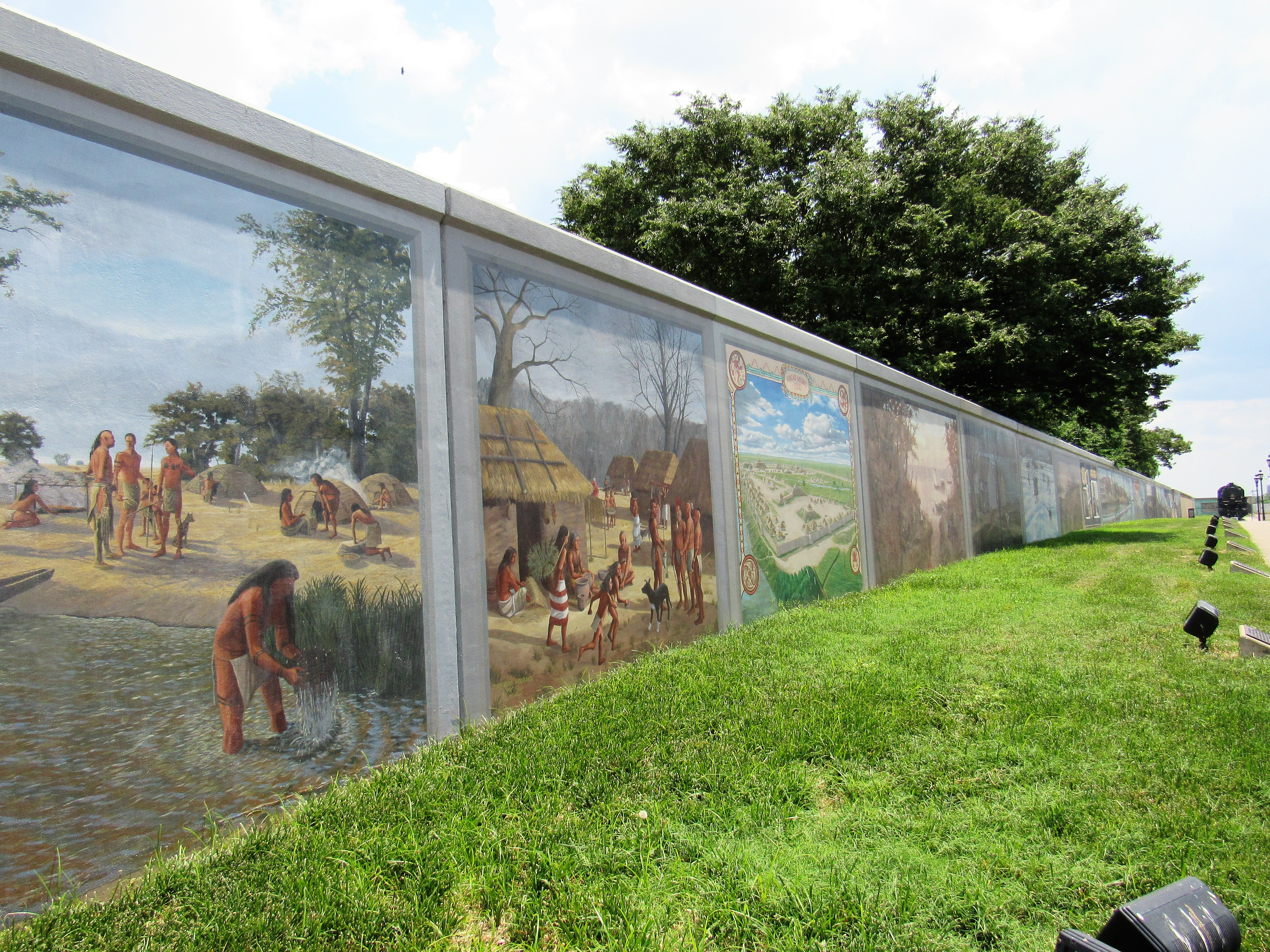
Paducah Flood Wall

In 1996, the Paducah Wall to Wall mural program was begun by the Louisiana mural artist Robert Dafford and his team on the floodwall in downtown Paducah. They have painted more than 50 murals addressing numerous subjects, including Native American history, industries such as river barges and hospitals, local African-American heritage, the historic Carnegie Library on Broadway Street, steamboats, and local labor unions.

In May 2003, photographer Jim Roshan documented the painting of the Lewis and Clark Expedition mural during the America 24/7 project. One of the images was used in the book Kentucky24/7, published in 2004.

By 2008 the mural project was completed and being maintained. Muralist Herb Roe returned to the city each year to repaint and refurbish the panels. Roe is the only muralist associated with the project to have worked on all of the panels. Roe added a new mural to the project in the summer of 2010. It shows the 100-year history of the local Boy Scout troop, Troop 1. Troop 1 is one of only a handful of troops who share their centennial with that of the national scouting organization itself. The dedication for the mural was held on National Scout Sunday, February 6, 2011.

In 2017, artist Char Downs debuted the newest addition to the Wall to Wall mural program: a series of murals of award-winning quilts on the floodwall facing Park Street. Downs invested nearly 500 hours recreating Caryl Bryer Fallert-Gentry's historic award-winning quilt Corona II: Solar Eclipse—the first quilt in the series—in her studio in Paducah's Lower Town Arts District.

The Paducah Art Alliance has a program of Artist in Residencies to bring respected artists in to the city. In 2018 British Artist Ian Berry came and put on an exhibition to great acclaim. Ian is famed around the world with his art in denim, and fitted in with the textile art that Paducah is known for.

==== Lower Town Artist Relocation Program ====
In August 2000, Paducah's Artist Relocation Program was started to offer incentives for artists to relocate to its historic downtown and Lower Town areas. The program has become a national model for using the arts for economic development. It has received the Governors Award in the Arts, the Distinguished Planning Award from the Kentucky Chapter of the American Planning Association, the American Planning Association's National Planning Award, and most recently, the Kentucky League of Cities' Enterprise Cities Award.

Lower Town, home of the Artist Relocation Program, is the oldest neighborhood in Paducah. As retail commerce moved toward the outskirts of the city, efforts were made to preserve the architectural character, and historic Victorian structures were restored in the older parts of the city. The artists' housing program contributed to that effort and became a catalyst for revitalizing the downtown area. The Luther F. Carson Center for the Performing Arts was completed in downtown Paducah in 2004.

==== UNESCO Creative City ====
On November 21, 2013, Paducah was designated by the United Nations Educational, Scientific and Cultural Organization (UNESCO) as a Creative City of Crafts and Folk Art. Arts and cultural initiatives have included the Lower Town Artist Relocation program, the National Quilt Museum, Paducah "Wall to Wall" floodwall murals, and the Paducah School of Art and Design. Participation in the program has been criticized by local business owners and by Paducah's economic development council due to the financial cost to the city, and because the "UNESCO Creative Cities Network only benefits a small portion of Paducah's economy".

=== Music ===
The Luther F. Carson Center for the Performing Arts was completed in downtown Paducah in 2004. From Crosby, Stills & Nash to Garrison Keillor, Shanghai Circus to STOMP, the Carson Center hosts touring Broadway productions, well-known entertainers, dramas, dance and popular faith-based and family series.

In September 2004, plans came together to highlight Paducah's musical roots through the redevelopment of the southern side of downtown. The centerpiece of the effort is the renovation of Maggie Steed's Hotel Metropolitan.[28] Prominent African-American musicians such as Louis Armstrong, Duke Ellington, Cab Calloway, Chick Webb's orchestra, B.B. King, Bobby "Blue" Bland, Ike and Tina Turner and other R & B and blues legends have performed here as part of what has become known as the "Chitlin' Circuit". Supporters want to promote Paducah's role in the history of American music.

Paducah is the birthplace and residence of musicians in various genres. Rockabilly Hall of Fame artists Ray Smith, whose recording of "Rockin' Little Angel" was a hit in 1960, and Stanley Walker, who played guitar for Ray Smith and others, grew up in Paducah. Terry Mike Jeffrey, an Emmy-nominated songwriter, is a resident of Paducah. Nashville, Tennessee–based composer–violinist, Mark Evitts, is also from Paducah. The most prominent mainstream artist is Steven Curtis Chapman, the top-selling Christian artist of all time.

Paducah is one of only two cities named in the world-famous song "Hooray for Hollywood", which is used as the opening number for the Academy of Motion Picture Arts and Sciences Awards (the Oscars). The 1937 song, with music by Richard Whiting and lyrics by Johnny Mercer, contains in the second verse: "Hooray for Hollywood! That phony, super Coney, Hollywood. They come from Chilicothes and Padukahs..."

Both cities were misspelled in the original published lyrics, though that may have been the fault of the publishers rather than Mercer. He was noted for his sophistication and the attention to detail he put into his lyrics. The correct spellings are "Chillicothe" and "Paducah".

Paducah is also mentioned in the song "Paducah", sung by Benny Goodman and Carmen Miranda, from the 1943 musical film The Gang's All Here.

== Sports ==
Paducah was home to professional baseball's minor league Class D Kentucky–Illinois–Tennessee League (or KITTY League) Paducah Paddys (1903), Paducah Indians (1904–1906, 1910, 1914, 1922–1923, 1936–1941), Paducah Polecats (1911), Paducah Chiefs (1912–1913, 1951–1955), and Paducah Redbirds (1935). The Chiefs competed in the Mississippi-Ohio Valley League from 1949 to 1950.

The Chiefs played in J. Polk Brooks Stadium from its opening in 1948 until the KITTY League folded after the 1955 season. Since then, the ballpark has served as the home venue for Paducah Tilghman High School and American Legion Post 31 baseball teams, as well as various special baseball games and tournaments. In recent years, Brooks Stadium hosted the Ohio Valley Conference baseball tournament (2001–2009) and the National Club Baseball Association World Series (2015 and 2016).

Brooks Stadium currently is the home field for the Paducah Chiefs of the Ohio Valley Summer Collegiate Baseball League.

In 1969, the Paducah Community College Indians won the National Junior College men's basketball championship.

The Paducah International Raceway is a 3/8-mile motorsport racetrack built in 1972.

== Government ==
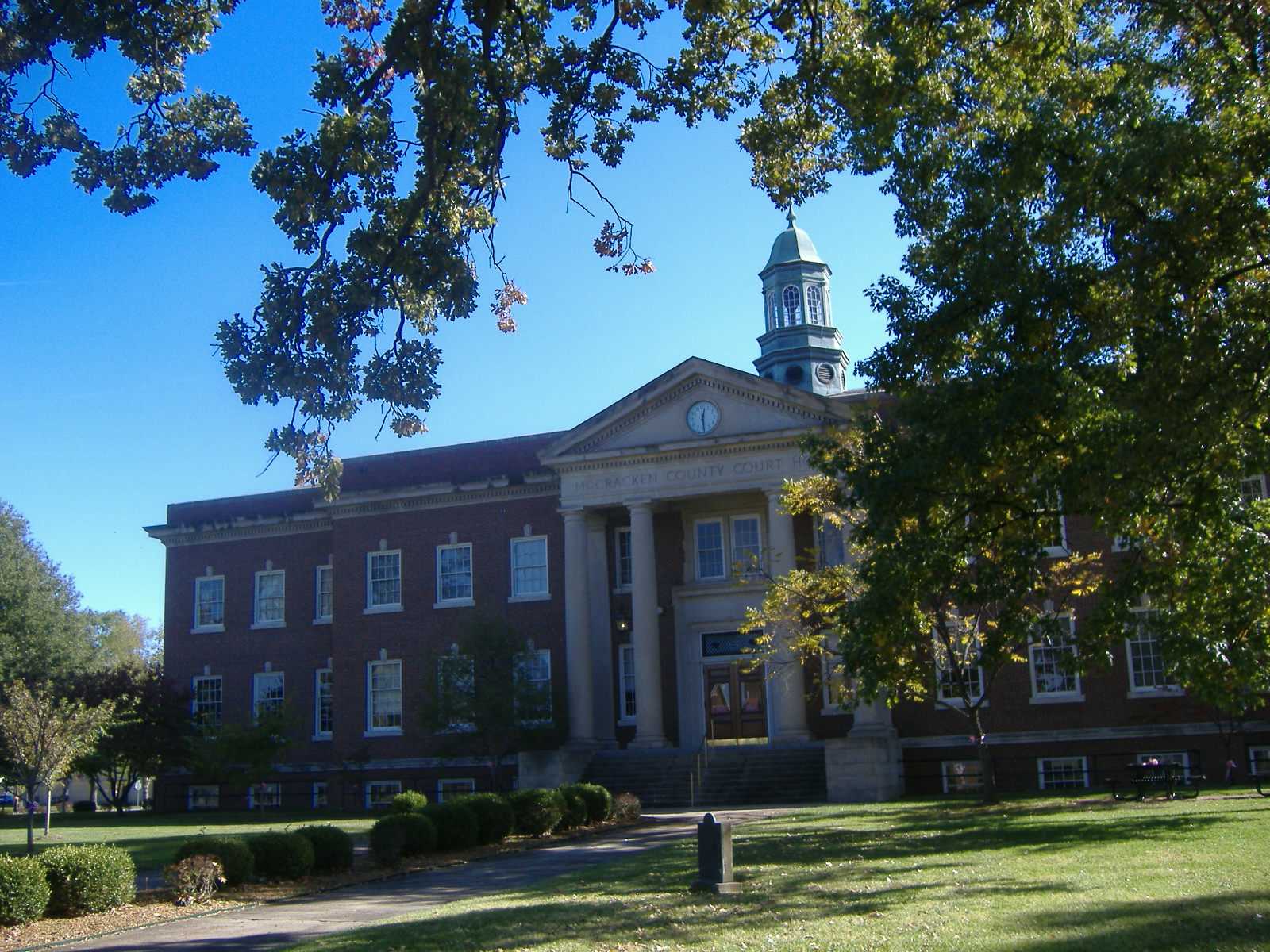
McCracken County Courthouse

Paducah operates under a council–manager form of city government. The Paducah Board of Commissioners is made up of the mayor and four commissioners elected at-large by the citizens on a non-partisan basis. The mayor is elected for a four-year term and commissioners each for a two-year term. The mayor and council select and appoint a city manager to operate the city.

== Education ==
Paducah Public Schools operates public schools serving most of the City of Paducah. Three K–5 elementary schools, Clark Elementary School, McNabb Elementary School and Morgan Elementary School, serve the city. All district residents are zoned to Paducah Middle School and Paducah Tilghman High School.

Parts of the city and the remainder of the surrounding county are instead served by the McCracken County Public Schools. Concord Elementary School and Reidland Elementary/Intermediate serve students through the 5th grade; Lone Oak Elementary School and Hendron–Lone Oak Elementary School end at the third grade, with 4th and 5th grade students in those schools' attendance zones attending Lone Oak Intermediate School. Middle school students in those areas may be zoned into Heath, Lone Oak, or Reidland Middle School. The county district began operating a single, consolidated McCracken County High School on August 9, 2013. The Paducah city district did not participate in this consolidation and Paducah Tilghman High School remains separate.

Paducah is also home to two private school systems, St. Mary High School and Community Christian Academy.

=== Higher education ===
West Kentucky Community and Technical College (WKCTC) is a member of the Kentucky Community and Technical College System and is a public, two-year, degree-granting institution serving the Western Region of Kentucky. There are approximately 6,200 students enrolled at the college. WKCTC was rated as one of the top 10 community colleges in the United States by the Aspen Institute for 2011, 2013, 2015 and 2017.

There is a Paducah campus of the University of Kentucky College of Engineering located on the WKCTC campus.

There is also a Paducah campus of Murray State University, which offers approximately 20 bachelor's and master's degree programs. It has a 43,000-square-foot (4,000 m^{2}) facility located on a 23-acre (9.3 ha) campus adjacent to WKCTC that was opened in 2014.

=== Public library ===
Paducah has a lending library, the McCracken County Public Library.

== Media ==
=== Broadcast ===
Paducah is one of three principal cities of the Paducah-Cape Girardeau-Harrisburg media market. Locally, television stations in Paducah include NBC affiliate WPSD-TV, MyNetworkTV affiliate WDKA (a sister station to Cape Girardeau-based Fox affiliate KBSI), and Kentucky Educational Television satellite station WKPD. Paducah is also served by Harrisburg-based ABC affiliate WSIL-TV and Cape Girardeau-based CBS affiliate KFVS-TV. Paducah was also previously home to WQWQ-LD, which served as the area's affiliate of The CW. That station now operates from Cape Girardeau as the market's Telemundo affiliate, but is still nominally licensed in Paducah.

Six radio stations are located in Paducah; half of the stations are owned by Bristol Broadcasting Company.

=== Print ===
The main print outlet is the regional daily newspaper The Paducah Sun, owned by Paxton Media Group, which owns WPSD. The weekly newspapers, the West Kentucky News and The Good Neighbor, enjoy significant readership.

The bi-monthly magazine Paducah Life debuted in 1994 and continues publication today. The magazine features articles about life and residents in and around Paducah. Purchase Area Family Magazine, a monthly publication distributed throughout Western Kentucky and Metropolis, Illinois, debuted in 2003. The magazine features a comprehensive calendar of events for the Purchase Area as well as unique articles about events, organizations and activities for families in the region.

== Infrastructure ==
=== Transportation ===
==== Port Authority ====
- The Paducah–McCracken County Riverport Authority was established in 1964 by the legislative bodies of the County of McCracken and the City of Paducah under an equal ownership agreement. The Riverport Authority is a quasi-government agency that provides essential maritime services for the rural regions of Western Kentucky, Southern Illinois, Southeast Missouri, and Northwestern Tennessee. The agency specializes in bulk, agricultural, general, and containerized cargoes, and operates Foreign Trade Zone No. 294. It is the only United States Maritime Administration Marine Highway Designation on the Ohio River and the only Marine Highway port on the river that is designated for container on barge service. The authority owns the largest flat-top crane in North America.

==== Air service ====
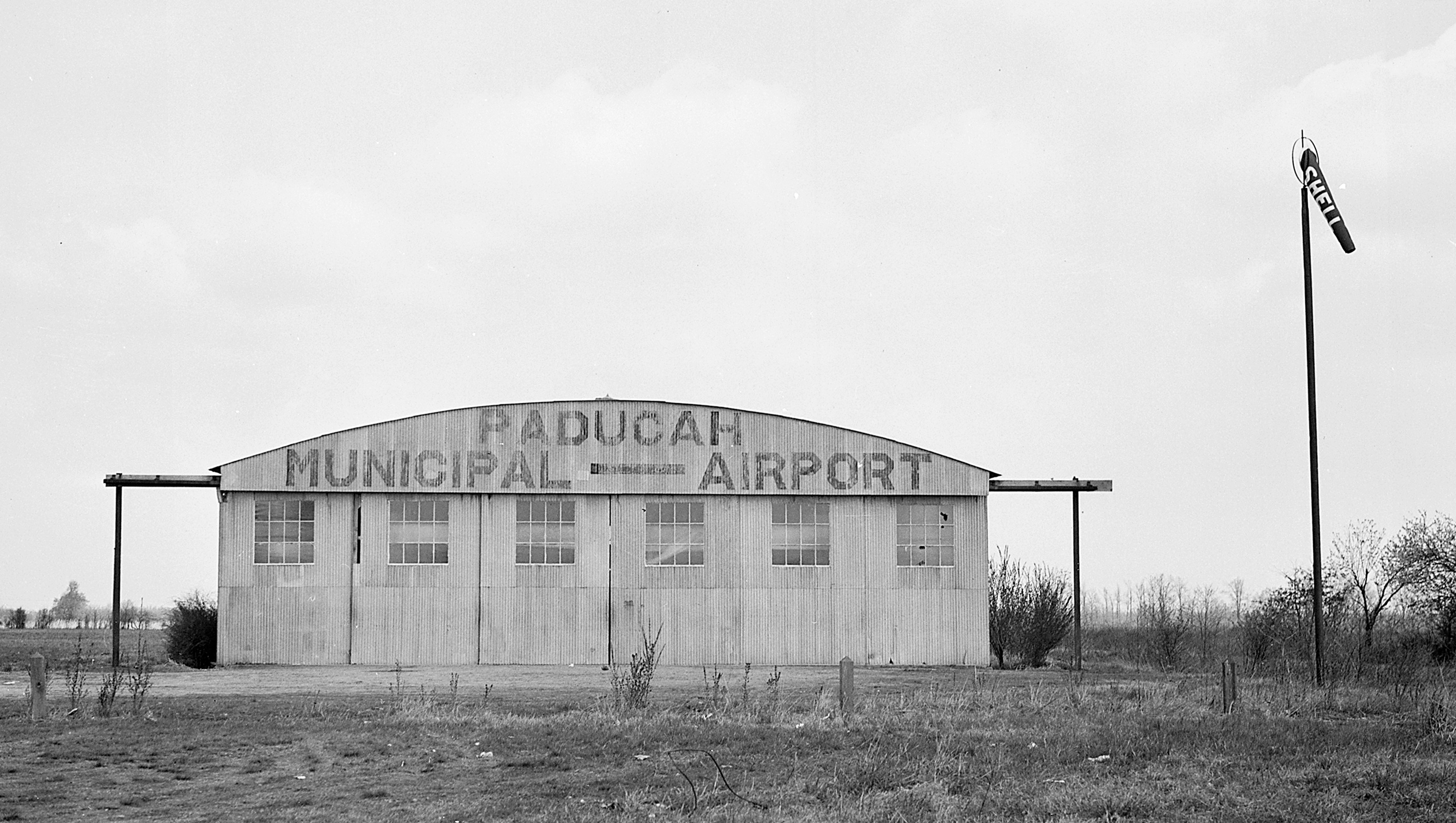
Paducah Airport, 1938

- Barkley Regional Airport (PAH) serves the area offering regional jet service to Charlotte Douglas International Airport (CLT). CLT is ranked among the world's top 10 busiest airports, offering nonstop service to 178 destinations, including 36 international. Barkley Regional Airport is served by one airline, Contour Airlines. Barkley Regional Airport is concluding a multi-million dollar construction/relocation of its terminal.

==== Transit ====
The Paducah Area Transit System (PATS) provides fixed-route transit and paratransit service in and around the city. Fixed-route services operate from Monday through Saturday from 7 am to 7 pm on four routes.

==== Roadways ====
- Interstate 24 is a four-lane freeway that runs west to provide access to St. Louis and east to Nashville. The highway has a business loop that runs through downtown Paducah.
- Interstate 69 is a U.S. Interstate that has recently been constructed and designated as I-69 through Kentucky, which follows the route of the retired Purchase Parkway to the south, starting in Fulton, running south encircling Paducah to the east, and heading towards Evansville, where an I-69 crossing is currently planned. When the full interstate route is completed, it will connect north to Indianapolis and south to Memphis.
- US 60 is a major east–west highway that runs through the Paducah business district.
- US 45 enters the city from the north via the Irvin S. Cobb Bridge from Brookport, Illinois, and runs south down to Mayfield.
- US 62 connects to Cairo, Illinois, to the west and Calvert City to the east.
- US 68 connects the Land Between the Lakes National Recreation Area, Hopkinsville and Bowling Green to the east-southeast.

== Notable people ==
- Michael Adams, Kentucky Secretary of State
- Annie Andrews, Senator-elect for South Carolina
- Charles "Speedy" Atkins, an African-American pauper whose body was mummified and occasionally put on display at funeral home until finally being buried 66 years later in 1994
- Alben W. Barkley, 35th Vice President of the United States (during the presidency of Harry Truman)
- Benjamin Beaton, Judge of the United States District Court for the Western District of Kentucky (2020–present)
- Isaac Wolfe Bernheim, distiller and philanthropist, founder of I. W. Harper brand of bourbon whiskey and Bernheim Arboretum and Research Forest
- Sara Bradley, chef
- Susan Bradley-Cox, USA Triathlete, named USA Triathlon Grand Masters Athlete of the Year in 1997 and 1998 and was selected as Masters Triathlete of the Year by Triathlete magazine in 1997
- Fred Burch, professional songwriter, P.T. 109, Tragedy, and many others
- William O. Burch, a decorated naval aviator and triple Navy Cross recipient during who reached the rank of Rear Admiral in the United States Navy.
- Julian Carroll, former Governor of Kentucky, member of Kentucky House of Representatives and Kentucky Senate
- Sam Champion, television weatherman and managing editor of The Weather Channel
- Steven Curtis Chapman, Christian music singer-songwriter, record producer, actor, author, and social activist
- Joseph "'Jumpin' Joe" Clifton, Navy officer who served in World War II and rose to rank of Rear Admiral
- Irvin S. Cobb, author, screenwriter and humorist, anti-Prohibition campaigner
- Russ Cochran, professional golfer on Champions Tour, previously on PGA Tour and Nationwide Tour
- Jan Crutchfield, country music singer and songwriter.
- Jerry Crutchfield, country and pop music producer and songwriter
- Vic Dana, Billboard Top 100 hit recording artist and professional dancer. Popular hits include "Red Roses for a Blue Lady", "Little Altar Boy", "I Will", "More", "Shangri-La", "I Love You Drops", and "If I Never Knew Your Name".
- Pierre DuMaine, Roman Catholic bishop
- Edwin E. Ellis, U.S. Navy photographer who visually documented Antarctica, inventor, businessman
- Mark Evitts, composer, string-arranger, producer and multi-instrumentalist
- Maria Farmer, American visual artist, known for being the first victim of Jeffrey Epstein to report to law enforcement sexual abuse related to him and associates, in 1996.
- May Mourning Farris McKinney, President General of the United Daughters of the Confederacy
- Steve Finley, former baseball player, two-time All-Star, World Series champion, and five-time Gold Glove Award winner
- Josh Forrest, former linebacker for the Los Angeles Rams
- Clarence "Big House" Gaines, Hall of Fame basketball coach, with a 47-year coaching career at Winston-Salem State University in Winston-Salem, North Carolina
- J. D. Grey, Southern Baptist clergyman influential in Southern Baptist Convention
- Robert H. Grubbs, Nobel Laureate in Chemistry for work on the organic reaction Olefin Metathesis
- Eddie Haas, Major League Baseball outfielder, coach, manager and scout
- Molly Harper, author of multiple contemporary and paranormal romance novels, including the Nice Girls vampire series and the Southern Eclectic series
- Tim Jaeger, artist
- Robert Karnes, actor, starred in television series The Lawless Years
- Callie Khouri, screenwriter, producer and director, won an Academy Award for Best Screenplay for Thelma and Louise
- Brent Leggs, African American historical preservationist, founding director of the African American Cultural Heritage Action Fund (part of the National Trust for Historic Preservation)
- Kelley Lovelace, country music songwriter known primarily for his work with country music artist Brad Paisley
- Fate Marable, jazz pianist, bandleader, and player of a steam calliope
- Jeffrey L. McWaters, CEO/founder of Amerigroup Corp., Virginia state senator
- Matty Matlock, Dixieland clarinetist, saxophonist, and arranger, replaced Benny Goodman in the Ben Pollack band doing arrangements and performing on clarinet
- Kenny Perry, golfer on PGA Tour and Champions Tour
- Ersa Poston, civil service and employment opportunity reformer
- Boots Randolph, saxophonist who was a major part of the "Nashville Sound" for most of his professional career, best known for his hit "Yakety Sax", which became Benny Hill's signature tune
- Trevor "Ricochet" Mann, professional wrestler in AEW
- Adelaide Day Rollston, poet and author
- Gene Roof, former Major League Baseball outfielder and coach
- Phil Roof, former Major League Baseball catcher for Kansas City/Oakland Athletics and Minnesota Twins, bullpen coach for several MLB teams, and minor league team manager
- Phil Maton, Major League Baseball pitcher for the New York Mets, San Diego Padres, Tampa Bay Rays, Houston Astros, and Cleveland Guardians
- Jeri Ryan, actress known for work on the television series Star Trek: Voyager and Boston Public; winner of 1989 Miss Illinois pageant
- John Scopes, teacher accused for teaching the theory of evolution in the Scopes Trial
- Terry Shumpert, Major League Baseball utility player for the Kansas City Royals
- Roy Skinner, former Vanderbilt basketball coach
- Ray Smith, rockabilly musician
- Josh Stewart, Major League Baseball pitcher for Chicago White Sox and in Japan for the Orix Buffaloes
- Larry Stewart, lead singer of country pop band Restless Heart
- Patsy Terrell, former Kansas state representative
- Lloyd Tilghman, Confederate general who commanded a brigade in the Vicksburg Campaign and was killed at the Battle of Champion Hill
- Emma Talley, LPGA golfer, 2013 U.S. Women's Amateur champion, 2015 NCAA Division I Women's Golf Championship champion
- Paul Twitchell, founder of religious movement known as Eckankar
- Stephen Vaughn, acting United States Trade Representative (2017)
- Marcy Walker (also known as Marcy Smith), minister and former actress known for television appearances on daytime soap operas
- Robert McDaniel Webb (known as Danny), former MLB pitcher with the Chicago White Sox
- J.D. Wilkes, visual artist, musician, author, and amateur filmmaker
- Rumer Willis, actress and daughter of Bruce Willis and Demi Moore, born in Paducah while her parents were visiting for filming of In Country
- George Wilson, former football safety for NFL's Tennessee Titans

== See also ==
- List of cities and towns along the Ohio River
- Paducah, Texas
- WIAR (Kentucky)
