= The Harvard Advocate =

Art and literary magazine of Harvard College

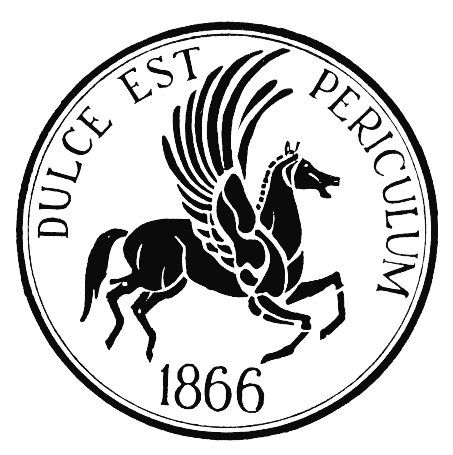

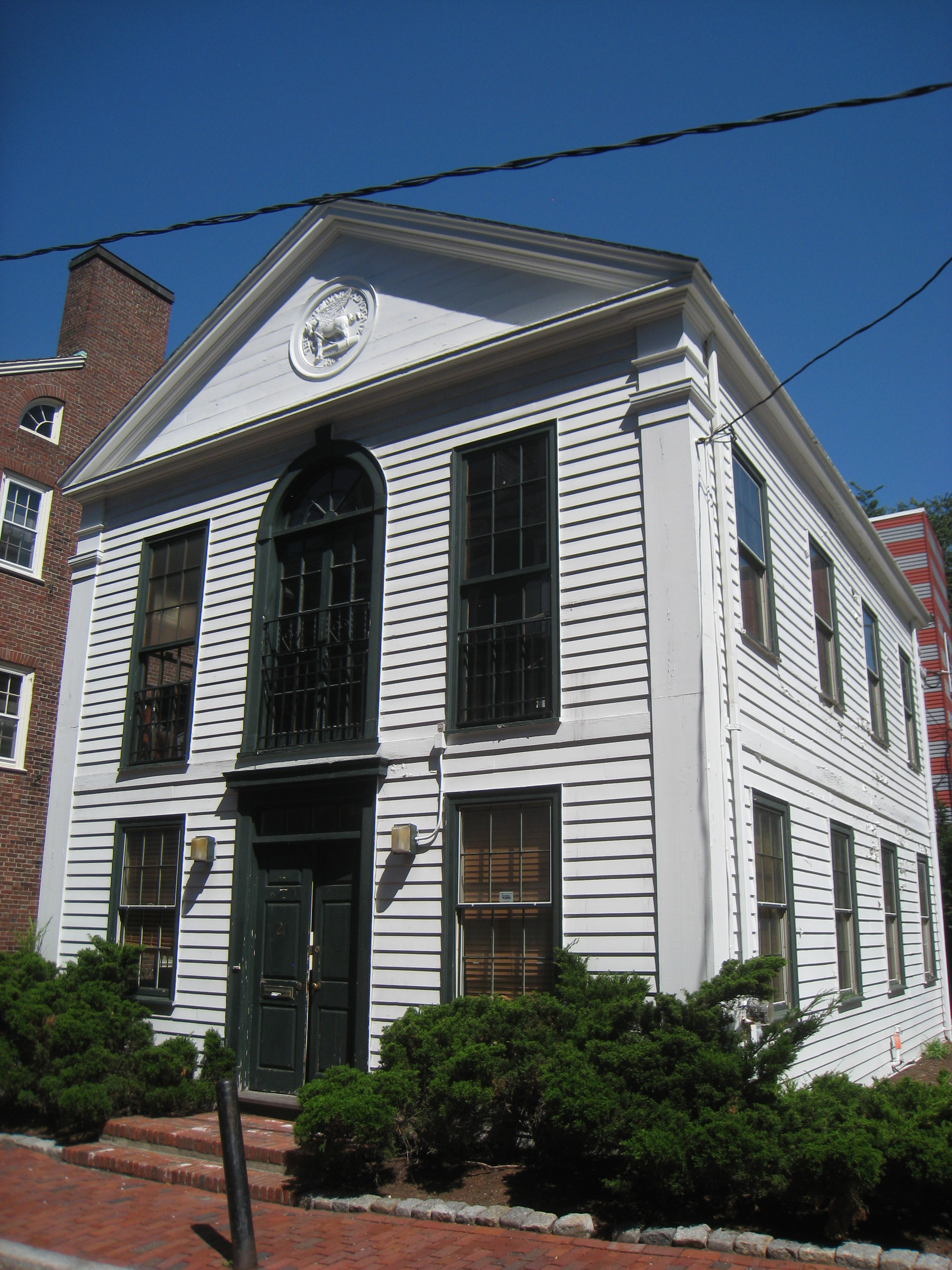
- Headquarters of The Harvard Advocate at 21 South Street, Cambridge, Massachusetts, United States
- Categories: Art, culture, fiction, humor
- Frequency: Quarterly
- Founder: Charles S. Gage; William G. Peckham
- Founded: May 11, 1866; 160 years ago
- Country: United States
- Website: www.theharvardadvocate.com
- ISSN: 0017-8004
- OCLC: 8158155

The Harvard Advocate, the art and literary magazine of Harvard College, is the oldest continuously published college art and literary magazine in the United States. The magazine (published then in newspaper format) was founded by Charles S. Gage and William G. Peckham in 1866 and, except for a hiatus during the last years of World War II, has published continuously since then. In 1916, The New York Times published a commemoration of the Advocate's fiftieth anniversary. Fifty years after that, Donald Hall wrote in The New York Times Book Review: "In the world of the college—where every generation is born, grows old and dies in four years—it is rare for an institution to survive a decade, much less a century. Yet the Harvard Advocate, the venerable undergraduate literary magazine, celebrated its centennial this month." Its current offices are a two-story wood-frame house at 21 South Street, near Harvard Square and the university campus.

Today, the Harvard Advocate publishes quarterly. Its mission is to "publish the best art, fiction, poetry and prose the Harvard undergraduate community has to offer." It also accepts submissions from professional writers and artists beyond the Harvard community.

== History ==
=== Founding and early years ===
When the Advocate was founded, it adopted the mottos Dulce est Periculum (Danger Is Sweet) and Veritas Nihil Veretur (Truth Fears Nothing), which had been used by an earlier Harvard newspaper, the Collegian. The magazine originally avoided controversial topics, lest university authorities shut it down; by the time the editors were making the then-radical demand for coeducation at Harvard, the magazine had attracted the support of James Russell Lowell and Oliver Wendell Holmes, and its life was less precarious.

The founding in 1873 of The Harvard Crimson newspaper (originally the Magenta) and in 1876 of the Harvard Lampoon humor magazine led the Advocate by the 1880s to devote itself to essays, fiction, and poetry.

Over the years, the undergraduate editors of and contributors to the Advocate have attained fame, literary and otherwise. Theodore Roosevelt edited the magazine in 1880. Edwin Arlington Robinson, Wallace Stevens, E. E. Cummings, and T. S. Eliot all published their undergraduate poetry in the Advocate. Before World War II, undergraduates who worked on the Advocate included Malcolm Cowley, James Agee, Robert Fitzgerald, Leonard Bernstein, James Laughlin (who got into trouble with local police for publishing a racy story by Henry Miller) and Norman Mailer.

=== After World War II ===
The Advocate suspended publication during World War II, and resumed publication with its April 1947 issue. Editors after the war included Daniel Ellsberg. The postwar Advocate published undergraduate and/or graduate work by Richard Wilbur, Robert Bly, John Ashbery, Donald Hall, Frank O'Hara, John Hawkes, Harold Brodkey, Kenneth Koch, and Jonathan Kozol, as well as illustrations by Edward Gorey. Contributors from outside Harvard during this time included Ezra Pound, William Carlos Williams, and Archibald MacLeish.

Other contributors after World War II included Adrienne Rich (the first woman to publish regularly in the magazine), Howard Nemerov, Marianne Moore, Robert Lowell, Tom Wolfe, James Atlas, and Sallie Bingham.

Some recent alumni of note include novelists Louis Begley, Peter Gadol, Lev Grossman, Benjamin Kunkel, and Francine Prose, poets Carl Phillips and Frederick Seidel, biographer and critic Jean Strouse, journalists Elif Batuman and Timothy Noah, literary scholar Peter Brooks, editors Jonathan Galassi and Susan Morrison, businessmen Steve Ballmer and Thomas A. Stewart, filmmaker Terrence Malick, and writer and video game developer Austin Grossman.

First Flowering: The Best of the Harvard Advocate, 1866–1976, an anthology of selections from the magazine edited by Richard Smoley, was published by Addison-Wesley in 1977. In 1986, The Harvard Advocate Anniversary Anthology was published in conjunction with the 120th year of the magazine's publication and Harvard's 350th anniversary. The anthology reproduced actual pages and artwork published in the magazine, introducing each literary era with a brief historical overview.

=== 21st century ===
The Advocate received a degree of national press attention after a controversial 2000 interview with writer Dave Eggers.

In 2016, the Advocate celebrated its sesquicentennial. The celebrations included the launching of a new website, a campaign to raise $150,000 for the magazine, and a party in New York City.

As of 2023, the Advocate publishes two print issues annually, and has increased its digital presence with increased engagement through social media and a renewed website, replacing the sesquicentennial website.

== Notable past members ==
=== Academics and criticism ===
- Svetlana Alpers, art historian, critic and professor at University of California at Berkeley
- Elif Batuman, author, academic, critic
- Amy Boesky, writer, professor of English at Boston College
- Van Wyck Brooks, literary critic
- John Mason Brown, drama critic, author
- Richard Bulliet, professor of history at Columbia University
- Stephanie Burt, literary critic, poet, professor at Harvard University
- Charles Townsend Copeland, Harvard professor of English literature
- Holland Cotter, art critic with The New York Times, winner of the Pulitzer Prize for Criticism
- Malcolm Cowley, poet, literary critic, editor at The New Republic
- Jonathan Culler, literary critic, professor of English at Cornell University
- Thomas F. Glick, professor of history at Boston University
- Mark Greif, critic, co-founder of the literary journal n+1
- Allen Grossman, poet, critic, professor of humanities at Johns Hopkins University
- Lev Grossman, novelist, journalist, book critic for Time Magazine
- Rachel Hadas, poet, professor of English at Rutgers University
- Leslie Kirwan, government official, Harvard Dean for Finance and Administration
- George Lyman Kittredge, literary critic, Harvard professor of English literature
- Susan Manning, dance historian, professor of English and theatre at Northwestern University
- James Matisoff, professor of linguistics, UC Berkeley
- Margaret Mills, folklorist, professor of Near Eastern languages and cultures at Ohio State University
- Christopher Minkowski, professor of Sanskrit at the University of Oxford
- Stephen Minot, novelist
- William Vaughn Moody, literary critic, Harvard English professor
- Laurie L. Patton, author, poet, dean of Arts and Sciences and professor of religion at Duke University
- Harriet Ritvo, historian, professor of history at Massachusetts Institute of Technology
- Kenji Yoshino, professor of constitutional law at New York University
- Arthur Waldron, professor of international relations at the University of Pennsylvania

=== Art, architecture, and engineering ===
- Miles Coolidge, photographer, art educator
- Ellen Harvey, visual artist
- Antoinette LaFarge, artist, writer, and professor of art at the University of California, Irvine
- Peter Soriano, artist and sculptor

=== Business and philanthropy ===
- Steve Ballmer, businessman, former CEO of Microsoft
- Jonathan Galassi, president and publisher of Farrar, Straus and Giroux
- Thomas W. Lamont, financier and philanthropist
- Michael Lynton, businessman, current CEO of Sony Pictures Entertainment
- Jeffrey Rayport, consultant author, businessman
- Andrew Wylie, literary agent, founder of The Wylie Agency

=== Editing and translation ===
- Witter Bynner, poet, translator
- John Keene, writer and translator
- Maxwell Perkins, editor for Ernest Hemingway, F. Scott Fitzgerald and Thomas Wolfe
- Richard Sieburth, translator, essayist, editor, professor of French and comparative literature at New York University
- Peter Theroux, translator

=== Fiction ===
- Conrad Aiken, novelist and poet
- Emily Barton, novelist, critic, professor of English at Smith College
- William Bayer, novelist, screenwriter
- Louis Begley, novelist
- Caleb Crain, novelist and critic
- Nicholas Delbanco, novelist, professor at Bennington College
- Sean Desmond, writer of Adams Fall, the basis for the 2002 film Abandon
- Nell Freudenberger, novelist, travel writer
- Peter Gadol, novelist
- Allegra Goodman, novelist
- Chad Harbach, novelist, co-founder of literary journal n+1
- Julie Hilden, novelist and lawyer
- Ann Hodgman, author of children's books
- Sara Houghteling, novelist and educator
- Angela Hur, novelist
- Benjamin Kunkel, novelist, co-founder of literary journal n+1
- Oliver LaFarge, writer, anthropologist, Pulitzer Prize winner
- Norman Mailer, writer
- Francine Prose, writer

=== Film, theater, television, and entertainment ===
- Robert Anderson, playwright
- William Bayer, novelist and screenwriter
- Harry Brown, poet, novelist, Oscar-winning screenwriter
- Chris Gerolmo, screenwriter, director
- Austin Grossman, author and game designer
- Maeve Kinkead, soap opera actress
- Franklin Leonard, co-founder of The Black List survey
- Karin Lewicki, screenwriter
- Percy MacKaye, dramatist and poet
- Terrence Malick, filmmaker
- Julie Mallozzi, documentary filmmaker, producer
- Lawrence Osgood, playwright and essayist
- Justin Rice, musician and actor
- Richard E. Robbins, documentarian
- Adam Stein, film director, writer and editor
- James Toback, filmmaker
- Ali Sethi, singer, songwriter and writer

=== Journalism and non-fiction writing ===
- Emily Benedek, journalist and author
- Jacob Brackman, journalist, musical lyricist
- Christopher Caldwell, journalist, senior editor at The Weekly Standard
- Amy Davidson, senior editor at The New Yorker
- Ben Downing, cultural historian
- William Emerson, journalist, editor-in-chief at the Saturday Evening Post
- Hermann Hagedorn, biographer
- Mark Helprin, novelist, journalist, conservative commentator
- Catherine Herridge, chief intelligence correspondent for the Fox News Channel
- H.V. Kaltenborn, radio broadcaster at NBC and CBS
- Perri Klass, pediatrician and writer
- David Laskin, writer, travel journalist
- Jonathan Larsen, former editor-in-chief at The Village Voice
- Sarah Manguso, memoirist, novelist, and poet
- Liz Marlantes, ABC News Correspondent
- Lance Morrow, essayist and writer at Time Magazine
- Timothy Noah, journalist and author, past senior editor of The New Republic
- Katha Pollitt, feminist poet, essayist and critic
- John Reed, journalist, poet, social activist
- Tom Reiss, author, historian, journalist, winner of the Pulitzer Prize for Biography or Autobiography
- Charlie Savage, newspaper reporter with The New York Times, recipient of the 2007 Pulitzer Prize
- Arthur M. Schlesinger, Jr., historian, writer
- Neil Sheehan, journalist, received the Pentagon Papers from Daniel Ellsberg
- Richard Smoley, writer on esotericism
- Thomas A. Stewart, journalist, editor, director of National Center for the Middle Market at the Fisher College of Business at Ohio State University
- Jean Strouse, biographer
- Melanie Thernstrom, author, contributing writer at The New York Times Magazine

=== Law and politics ===
- Daniel Baer, United States Ambassador for the Organization for Security and Co-operation in Europe
- Thomas C. Foley, American diplomat, businessman
- Learned Hand, judicial philosopher, judge in the United States Court of Appeals for the Second Circuit
- Todd M. Hughes, United States Circuit Judge
- Peter Jaszi, author, expert on copyright law
- Peter Junger, internet activist
- Grover Norquist, conservative political advocate
- Theodore Roosevelt, President of the United States
- Barbara Underwood, New York Solicitor General
- Charles Proctor Sifton, United States federal judge
- Kenji Yoshino, Chief Justice Earl Warren Professor of Constitutional Law at New York University

=== Poetry ===
- Judith Baumel, poet
- April Bernard, poet
- e.e. cummings, poet
- T.S. Eliot, poet
- Arthur Davison Ficke, poet
- Sidney Goldfarb, poet
- Alice Goodman, poet and librettist
- Donald Hall, poet, editor, 14th United States poet laureate
- Matthea Harvey, poet
- Robert Hillyer, poet, Harvard English professor
- Wayne Koestenbaum, poet, cultural critic, professor of English at the City University of New York
- Joyelle McSweeney, poet, critic, professor at University of Notre Dame
- Elise Paschen, editor, poet, co-founder of Poetry in Motion
- Carl Phillips, writer, poet, professor of English and Afro-American studies at Washington University in St. Louis
- Adrienne Rich, poet
- Edwin Arlington Robinson, poet, three time Pulitzer Prize winner
- Mary Jo Salter, poet, professor in Writing Seminars at Johns Hopkins University, co-editor of The Norton Anthology of Poetry
- Frederick Seidel, poet
- Wallace Stevens, poet
- John Hall Wheelock, poet, editor at Scribners
- John Brooks Wheelwright, poet
- Stephanie Burt, poet, Harvard English Professor

=== Science, technology, medicine, and mathematics ===
- Jordan Ellenberg, mathematician, professor at University of Wisconsin–Madison
- Sarah Blaffer Hrdy, anthropologist and primatologist
- Edward Hallowell, psychiatrist and author
- Wendell Lim, professor of cellular and molecular pharmacology at University of California, San Francisco
- Seth Lloyd, professor of mechanical engineering at the Massachusetts Institute of Technology
- James Propp, professor of mathematics at University of Massachusetts Lowell

=== Past presidents ===
1868: M Williams

1869: M.S. Severance

1870: R. Wolcott

1871: W.S. Bigelow

1872: P.C. Severance

1873: J. Lyman

1874: W.R. Tyler

1875: C.F. Canfield

1876: A.A. Wheeler

1877: George Edward Woodberry

1878: L. Hancock, E.W. Morse

1879: E. Hale

1880: Albert Bushnell Hart, H. Townsend

1881: C. Sprague

1883: C.H. Grandgent

1884: C.R. Clapp

1885: G.R. Nutter

1886: T.T. Baldwin

1887: Winthrop Wetherbee

1888: L. McK Garrison

1889: J.H. Sears

1890: G.P. Wardner

1891: S.C. Brackett

1892: John Corbin

1893: Learned Hand

1894: C.W. Slope

1895: C. M. Flandrau, J Mack Jr.

1896: J.A. Gade

1897: C.H. Hovey

1898: R. Putter

1899: John A. Macy

1900: William R. Castle, Jr.

1901: Wallace Stevens

1902: J.C. Grew

1903: Richard Washburn Child

1904: A.D. Fickle

1905: Arthur W. Page

1906: R.W. Beach

1907: J.L. Price

1908: Edward B. Sheldon

1909: A Whitman, F. Schenck

1910: W.G. Tinckom-Fernandez

1911: C.P. Aiken

1912: G.W. Gray

1913: Philip James Roosevelt

1914: P.W. Thayer

1915: H. Jackson Jr.

1916: H. Amory

1917: J.D. Parson

1918: Robert Nathan Cram, William Allis Norris, E. Whittlesey

1919: Charles MacVeagh Jr., Lloyd Kirkham Garrison, J.R. Parsons

1920: J.G. King Jr.

1921: Steddard Benham Colby

1922: W. Whitman

1923: M.A. Best

1924: Oliver LaFarge

1925: John Finley Jr.

1926: Walter Dumaux Edmonds Jr.

1927: Kendall Foss

1928: C.C. Abbott

1929: Robeson Bailey

1930: T. Hall Jr.

1931: Wilson Mumford Wing

1932: James Rufus Agee

1933: Robert Hatch

1934: C.L. Sulzberger

1935: Hugh M. Wade

1936: J.J. Slocum, Julian S. Bach

1937: F. Corning Kenly Jr.

1938: Alvah W. Sulloway

1939: Samuel N. Hinckly

1940: Thornton Frederick Bradshaw

1941: Westmore Wileox III

1944: Kingsley Ervin Jr.

1947: Donald B. Watt Jr.

1948: A.G. Haas

1949: Lloyd Staube Gilmour Jr.

1950: Donald Andrew Hall Jr., Daniel Ellsberg

1951: Harvey Slom Ginsberg

1952: George A. Kelly

1953: Samuel D. Stewart

1954: Allen Grossman

1955: Eugene S. Dodd

1956: John Ratte

1957: A. Whitney Ellsworth

1958: Peter P. Brooks

1959: E.J. Bresson

1960: E. deBresson

1961: B.A. Melnick

1962: J. Urrutia

1963: Terence Cogley

1964: Gerald P. Hillman

1965: Stuart A. Davis

1966: Stuart A. Davis

1967: Peter Shaw

1968: Thomas A. Stewart

1969: James R. Atlas

1970: Jonathan Galassi

1971: Chris Ma

1972: Gregory Moore

1973: R. Paul

1974: M. Leib

1975: Paul K. Rowe

1976: Douglas A. McIntyre

1977: John McCullough

1978: Richard V. Nalley

1979: Sarah V. Chace

1980: C. Gerard

1981: Sandra DeJong

1982: L. Murphy

1983: D. Longobardi

1984: S. Harney

1985: Peter D. Gadol

1986: Vivian S.M. Wang

1988: W. Caleb Crain

1989: M. Charters

1990: Rebecca Zorach

1991: Elizabeth Elsas

1992: Peter Nohrnberg

1993: Kelli Rae Patton

1994: Alp Aker

1995: Priya Aiyar

1996: C. You

1997: Daley C. Haggar

1998: Etienne Benson

1999: Saadi Soudavar

2000: Caroline Whitbeck

2001: Brooke Lampley

2002: Cody Carvel

2003: Walt Hunter

2004: Andrews Little

2005: Steven R. Williams

2006: Casey N. Cep

2007: Gregory R. Scruggs

2008: Alexandra Hays

2009: Sanders I. Bernstein

2010: Dana Kase

2011: Emily Chertoff

2012: Alexander J.B. Wells

2013: Tyler Richard

2014: Julian Lucas

2015: Kiara Barrow

2016: Henry Shah

2017: Lily Scherlis

2018: Natasha Lasky

2019: Sabrina Helen Li

2020: Owen Torrey

2021: Madi Howard

2022: Albert B. Zhang

2023: Annika Inampudi

2024: Maren E. Wong

2025: Frank Y.C. Liu

2026: Aran Sonnad-Joshi

== See also ==
- List of literary magazines
