= NCMM =

The abbreviation NCMM may stand for

- National Center for the Middle Market, Ohio State University, United States
- National Commission for Museums and Monuments, Nigeria
