= Culture of New York City =

New York City has been described as the cultural capital of the world. Its urban culture is reflected in its size and ethnic diversity. As many as 800 languages are spoken in New York, making it the most linguistically diverse city in the world. Many American cultural movements first emerged in the city. Large numbers of Irish, Italian, Jewish, Russian, and eventually African, Latino, and Asian Americans also migrated to New York throughout the 20th century and continuing into the 21st century, significantly influencing the city's culture and image. The city became the center of stand-up comedy in the early 20th century. The city was the top venue for jazz in the 1940s, expressionism in the 1950s and home to hip hop, punk rock, and the Beat Generation. Along with London's West End, New York City is the global center of musical theatre, often referred to as "Broadway" after the major thoroughfare in Manhattan. The Stonewall Inn in Greenwich Village, Lower Manhattan, is a designated U.S. National Historic Landmark and National Monument, as the site of the June 1969 Stonewall riots and the cradle of the modern gay rights movement.

The city is the birthplace of many cultural movements, including the Harlem Renaissance in literature and visual art; abstract expressionism (also known as the New York School) in painting; and hip hop, punk, salsa, freestyle, Tin Pan Alley, certain forms of jazz, and (along with Philadelphia) disco in music. New York has been considered the dance capital of the world. The city is also frequently the setting for novels, movies (see List of films set in New York City), and television programs. New York Fashion Week is one of the world's preeminent fashion events and is afforded extensive coverage by the media. New York has also frequently been ranked the top fashion capital of the world on the annual list compiled by the Global Language Monitor. Artists have been drawn into the city by opportunity, as the city government funds the arts with a larger annual budget than the National Endowment for the Arts, and New York is the center of the global art market, which grew up along with national and international media centers.

== Pace ==
One of the most common traits attributed to New York is its fast pace, which spawned the term "New York minute". Journalist Walt Whitman characterized New York's streets as being traversed by "hurrying, feverish, electric crowds".

== Department of Cultural Affairs ==
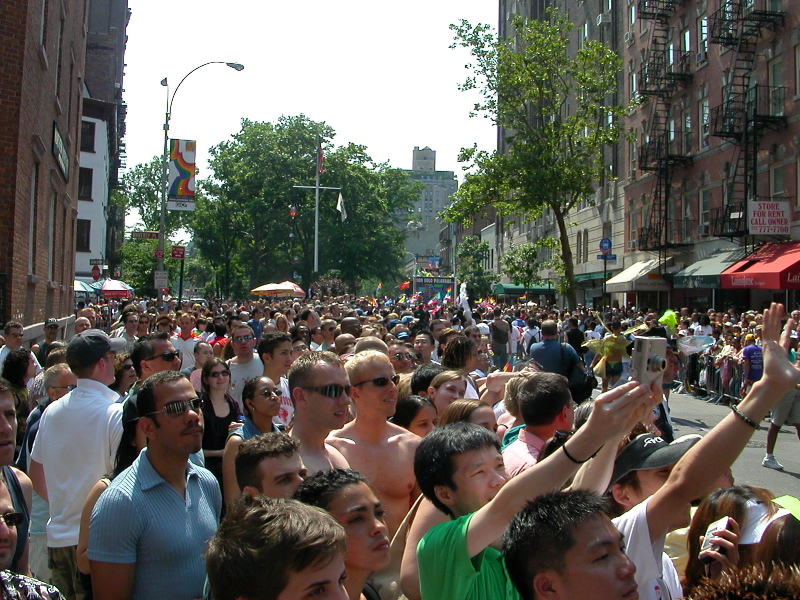
Millions of spectators gather every June to attend the NYC Pride March.

The Department of Cultural Affairs (DCLA), a branch of the government of New York City, is the largest public funder of the arts in the United States. DCLA's funding budget is larger than that of the National Endowment for the Arts, the federal government's national arts funding mechanism. DCLA provides funding and support services to about 1,400 art and cultural organizations in the five boroughs, including 375 museums, 96 orchestras, 24 performing arts centers, 7 botanical gardens, 5 zoos and 1 aquarium. Recipients span many disciplines, including the visual, literary and performing arts; public-oriented science and humanities institutions including zoos, botanical gardens and historic and preservation societies; and creative artists at all skill levels who live and work within the city's five boroughs. DCLA also administers the Percent for Art program, which funds public art at building sites. In fiscal year 2007, DCLA's expense budget, used for funding programming at non-profits, was $151.9 million. Its capital budget, used to support projects at 196 cultural organizations throughout the city ranging from roof replacement to new construction, is roughly $867 million for the period between 2007 and 2011.

== Arts ==
=== Music ===
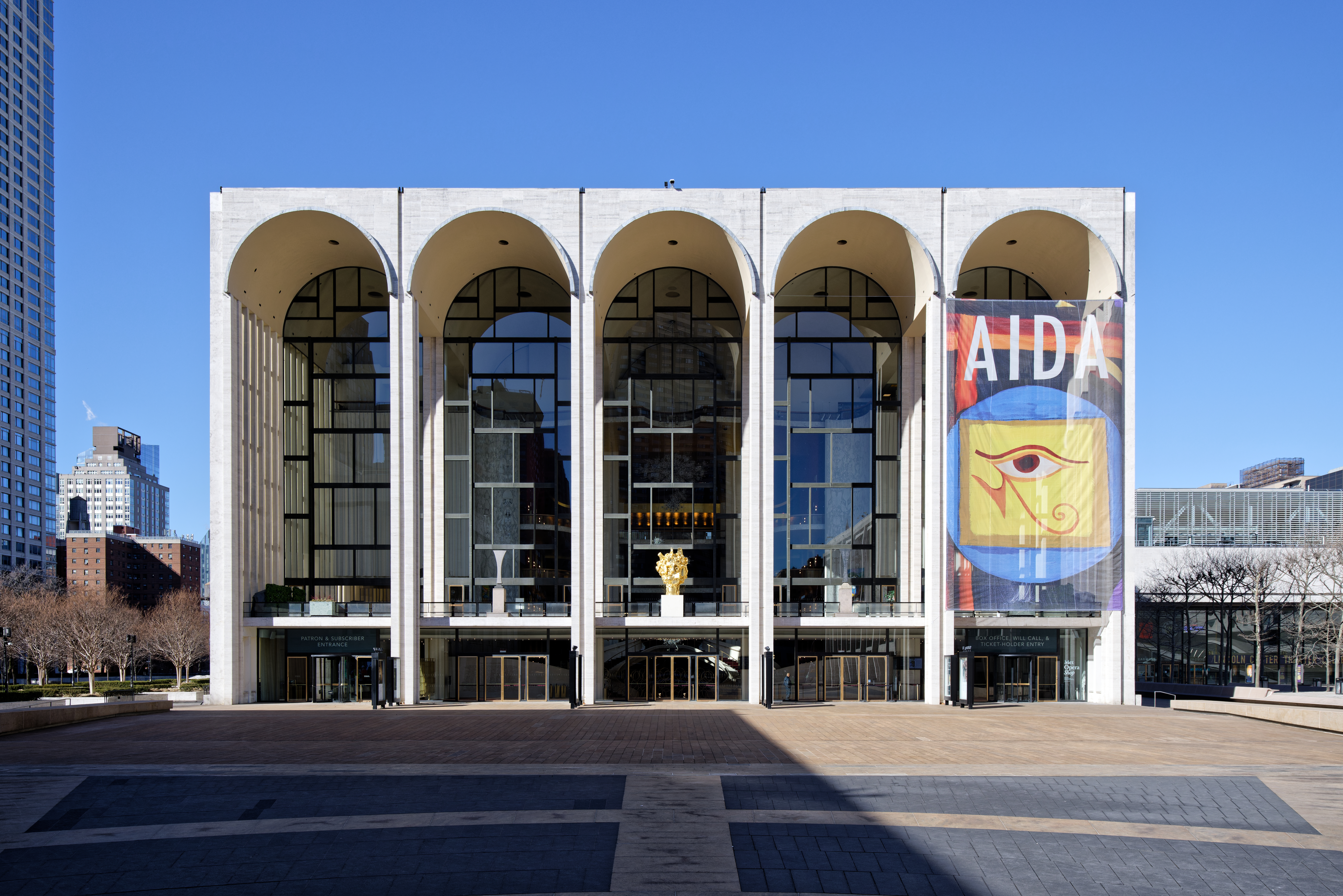
The Metropolitan Opera House at Lincoln Center

Beginning with the rise of popular sheet music in the early 20th century, New York's Broadway musical theater and Tin Pan Alley's songcraft, New York became a major center for the American music industry. Since then the city has served as an important center for many different musical topics and genres.

New York's status as a center for European classical music can be traced way back to the early 19th century. The New York Philharmonic, formed in 1842, did much to help establish the city's musical reputation. The first two major New York composers were William Fry and George Frederick Bristow, who in 1854 famously criticized the Philharmonic for choosing European composers over American ones. Bristow was committed to developing an American classical music tradition. His most important work was the Rip Van Winkle opera, which most influentially used an American folktale rather than European imitations.

The best-known New York composer, indeed, the best-known American classical composer of any kind, was George Gershwin. Gershwin was a songwriter with Tin Pan Alley and the Broadway theatres, and his works synthesized elements of many styles, including the music of New York's Yiddish theatre, vaudeville, ragtime, operetta, jazz and the post-Romantic music of European composers. Gershwin's work gave American classical music unprecedented international recognition. Following Gershwin, the next major American composer was Aaron Copland from Brooklyn, who used elements of American folk music and jazz in his compositions. His works included the Organ Symphony, which earned him comparisons to Igor Stravinsky, and the music for the ballet Appalachian Spring and the Copland Piano Variations.

The New York blues was a type of blues music characterized by significant jazz influences and a more modernized, urban feel than the country blues. Prominent musicians from this field include Lionel Hampton and Big Joe Turner. In New York, jazz became fused with stride (an advanced form of ragtime) and became highly evolved. Among the first major New York jazz musicians was Fletcher Henderson, whose jazz orchestra, first appearing in 1923, helped invent swing music. The swing style that developed from New York's big jazz bands was catchy and very danceable, and was originally played largely by black orchestras. Later, white bands led by musicians like Jimmy Dorsey and Benny Goodman began to dominate and produced a number of instrumentalists that had a profound effect on the later evolution of jazz. Star vocalists also emerged, mainly women like the bluesy Billie Holiday and the scat singer Ella Fitzgerald.

Beginning in the 1940s, New York was the center of a roots revival in American folk music. Many New Yorkers developed a renewed interest in blues, Appalachian folk music and other roots styles. Greenwich Village, in Lower Manhattan, became a hotbed of American folk music as well as leftist political activism. The performers associated with the Greenwich Village scene had sporadic mainstream success in the 1940s and 1950s; some, like Pete Seeger and the Almanac Singers, did well, but most were confined to local coffeehouses and other venues. Performers like Dave Van Ronk and Joan Baez helped expand the scene by appealing to university students. In the early 1960s, Baez was instrumental in introducing the up-and-coming young folk artist Bob Dylan to her audience and he quickly achieved national prominence. By the mid-1960s, folk and rock were merging, with Bob Dylan taking the lead in July 1965, releasing "Like a Rolling Stone", with a distinctive, revolutionary rock sound for its time, steeped in tawdry New York imagery, followed by an electric performance in late July at the Newport Folk Festival. Dylan plugged an entire generation into the milieu of the singer-songwriter, often writing from an urban, distinctly New York point of view. By the mid to late 1960s, bands and singer-songwriters began to proliferate the underground New York art and music scene. The release of The Velvet Underground & Nico in 1967, featuring singer-songerwriter Lou Reed and German singer and collaborator Nico was described as "most prophetic rock album ever made" by Rolling Stone in 2003.

Other New York based singer-songwriters began to emerge, using the urban landscape as their canvass, a backdrop for lyrics in the confessional style of poets like Anne Sexton and Sylvia Plath. In July 1969, Newsweek magazine ran a feature story, "The Girls-Letting Go", describing the groundbreaking music of Joni Mitchell, Laura Nyro, Lotti Golden and Melanie, as a new breed of female troubadour: "what is common to them are the personalized songs they write, like voyages of self discovery, brimming with keen observation and startling in the impact of their poetry." The work of these early New York based singer-songwriters, from Laura Nyro's New York Tendaberry (1969), to Lotti Golden's East Village diaries on Motor-Cycle her 1969 debut on Atlantic Records, has served as inspiration to generations of female singer-songwriters in the rock, folk and jazz traditions.

Disco music developed from the funk, soul and jazz of the 1960s, becoming a distinct genre of music, eschewing the raw sound of a four piece garage band and embracing a new technology that employed driving synthesizers with booming a bass drum that defined the disco sound with a steady quarter note beat, or Four on the floor (music). It was not unusual for producers to contract local symphony and philharmonic orchestras as well as session musicians to further refine the sound. Disco, a musical idiom that was strongly associated with minorities (primarily black and gay audiences), became a phenomenon in dance clubs and discothèques in the 1970s. Many of the major disco nightclubs were in New York, including Paradise Garage, Danceteria and Studio 54, attracting notable followers from the art world, such as Andy Warhol, the fashion industry like Karl Lagerfeld, as well as socialites, musicians and intellectuals. This tradition continued in the 1980s with Area, Danceteria, and Limelight.

In the 1970s, punk rock emerged in New York's downtown music scene with seminal bands such as the New York Dolls, Ramones and Patti Smith. Anthrax and Kiss were the best known heavy metal and glam rock performers from the city. The downtown scene developed into the "new wave" style of rock music at downtown clubs like CBGB's. The 1970s were also when the Salsa and Latin Jazz movements grew and branched out to the world. Labels such as the "Fania All Stars", musicians like Tito Puente and Celia Cruz and Ralph Mercado, the creator of the RM&M record label, all contributed to stars like Hector LaVoe, Ruben Blades and many others. The New Yorican Sound, differed somewhat from Salsa that came from Puerto Rico, it was being sung by Puerto Rican Americans from New York and had the swagger of the Big Apple.

Hip hop first emerged in the Bronx in the early 1970s at neighborhood block parties when DJs, like DJ Kool Herc, began isolating percussion breaks in funk and R&B songs and rapping while the audience danced. For many years, New York was the only city with a major hip-hop scene, and all of the early recordings came from New York. People like Kurtis Blow and LL Cool J brought hip hop to the mainstream for the first time, while so-called East Coast rap was defined in the 1980s by artists including Eric B. & Rakim, Kurtis Blow and Run-D.M.C. Major New York stars emerged to go on and produce multi-platinum records, including Puff Daddy, Jay-Z and The Notorious B.I.G., along with acts like Wu-Tang Clan, Nas, Big L, and Busta Rhymes.

New York is also one of only five cities in the United States with permanent professional resident companies in all of the major performing arts disciplines: The Metropolitan Opera, New York Philharmonic, New York City Ballet, and the Public Theater. The Lincoln Center for the Performing Arts, actually a complex of buildings housing 12 separate companies, is the largest arts institution in the world. It is also home to the internationally renowned Jazz at Lincoln Center. Other notable performance halls include Carnegie Hall, Radio City Music Hall, and the Brooklyn Academy of Music.

With nearly 8 million people riding the city's subway system each day, New York's transit network is also a major venue for musicians. Each week, more than 100 musicians and ensembles – ranging in genre from classical to Cajun, bluegrass, African, South American and jazz – give over 150 performances sanctioned by New York Transit at 25 locations throughout the subway system, playing instruments ranging from musical saw by Natalia Paruz, sitar by Anthony Carrera, to guitarists and vocalists such as G Will and Nicola Vazquez. .

=== Visual art ===
The 1913 Armory Show in New York, an exhibition which brought European modernist artists' work to the U.S., both shocked the public and influenced art making in the United States for the remainder of the twentieth century. The exhibition had a twofold effect of communicating to American artists that artmaking was about expression, not only aesthetics or realism, and at the same time showing that Europe had abandoned its conservative model of ranking artists according to a strict academic hierarchy. This encouraged American artists to find a personal voice, and a modernist movement, responding to American civilization, emerged in New York. Alfred Stieglitz (1864–1946), photographer, Charles Demuth (1883–1935) and Marsden Hartley (1877–1943), both painters, helped establish an American viewpoint in the fine arts. Stieglitz promoted cubists and abstract painters at his 291 Gallery on 5th Avenue. The Museum of Modern Art, founded in 1929, became a showcase for American and international contemporary art. By the end of World War II, Paris had declined as the world's art center while New York emerged as the center of contemporary fine art in both the United States and the world.

In the years after World War II, a group of young New York artists known as the New York School formed the first truly original school of painting in America that exerted a major influence on foreign artists: abstract expressionism. Among the movement's leaders were Jackson Pollock (1912–1956), Willem de Kooning (1904–1997), and Mark Rothko (1903–1970). The abstract expressionists abandoned formal composition and representation of real objects to concentrate on instinctual arrangements of space and color and to demonstrate the effects of the physical action of painting on the canvas.

New York's vibrant visual art scene in the 1950s and 1960s also defined the American pop art movement. Members of this next artistic generation favored a different form of abstraction: works of mixed media. Among them were Jasper Johns (1930– ), who used photos, newsprint, and discarded objects in his compositions. Pop artists, such as Andy Warhol (1930–1987), Larry Rivers (1923–2002), and Roy Lichtenstein (1923–1997), reproduced, with satiric care, everyday objects and images of American popular culture—Coca-Cola bottles, soup cans, comic strips.

Today New York is a global center for the international art market. The Upper East Side has many art galleries, and the downtown neighborhood of Chelsea is known for its more than 200 art galleries that are home to modern art from both upcoming and established artists. The industry is also present in neighborhoods known for their art galleries such as DUMBO, where dealers representing both established and up-and-coming artists compete for sales with bigger exhibition spaces, better locations, and stronger connections to museums and collectors. Wall Street money and funds from philanthropists flow steadily into the art market, often prompting artists to move from gallery to gallery in pursuit of riches and fame.

Enriching and countering this mainstream commercial movement is the constant flux of underground movements, such as hip-hop art and graffiti, which engendered such artists as Keith Haring and Jean-Michel Basquiat, and continue to add visual texture and life to the atmosphere of the city.

Long Island City, Queens is a rapidly flourishing art scene in New York, serving as home to the largest concentration of arts institutions outside of Manhattan. Its abundance of industrial warehouses provide ample studio and exhibition space for many renowned artists, museums and galleries.

==== Public art ====
New York has a law that requires no less than 1% of the first twenty million dollars of a building project, plus no less than one half of 1% of the amount exceeding twenty million dollars be allocated for art work in any public building that is owned by the city. The maximum allocation for any site is $400,000.

Many major artists have created public works in the city, including Jeff Koons, Louise Bourgeois, Nam June Paik, and Jim Power the "Mosaic Man". Anish Kapoor's Sky Mirror, a highly reflective stainless steel dish nearly three stories tall, was on view at Rockefeller Center in September and October 2006.

In 2005 Christo and Jeanne-Claude installed The Gates, a site-specific art project inspired by traditional Japanese torii gates. The installation consisted of 7,503 metal "gates" along 23 miles (37 km) of pathways in Central Park. From each gate hung a flag-shaped piece of saffron-colored nylon fabric.

The subway system also hosts several public art projects, including intricate tile mosaics and station signage.

Subversive public art trends have also coursed through New York. Toward the end of the 1960s the modern American graffiti subculture began to form in Philadelphia, 95 miles (153 km) south of New York. By 1970, the center of graffiti innovation moved from Philadelphia to New York, where the graffiti art subculture inspired an artistic style and social philosophy dubbed "Zoo York". The name originated from a subway tunnel running underneath the Central Park Zoo that was the haunt of very early "oldschool" graffiti writers like ALI (Marc André Edmonds), founder of The Soul Artists. The subway tunnel became a scene where crews of Manhattan graffiti artists gathered at night. With greater law enforcement and aggressive cleaning of subway trains in the 1980s and 1990s, the graffiti movement in New York eventually faded from the subway.

== Film ==
New York's film industry is smaller than that of Hollywood, but its billions of dollars in revenue makes it an important part of the city's economy and places it as the second largest center for the film industry in the United States.

New York was an epicenter of filmmaking in the earliest days of the American film industry, but the better year-round weather of Hollywood eventually saw California becoming the home of American cinema. The Kaufman-Astoria film studio in Queens, built during the silent film era, was used by the Marx Brothers and W. C. Fields. As cinema moved west, much of the motion picture infrastructure in New York was used for the burgeoning television industry. Kaufman-Astoria eventually became the set for The Cosby Show and Sesame Street.

New York has undergone a renaissance in film-making with 276 independent and studio films in production in the city in 2006, an increase from 202 in 2004 and 180 in 2003. More than a third of professional actors in the United States are based in New York.

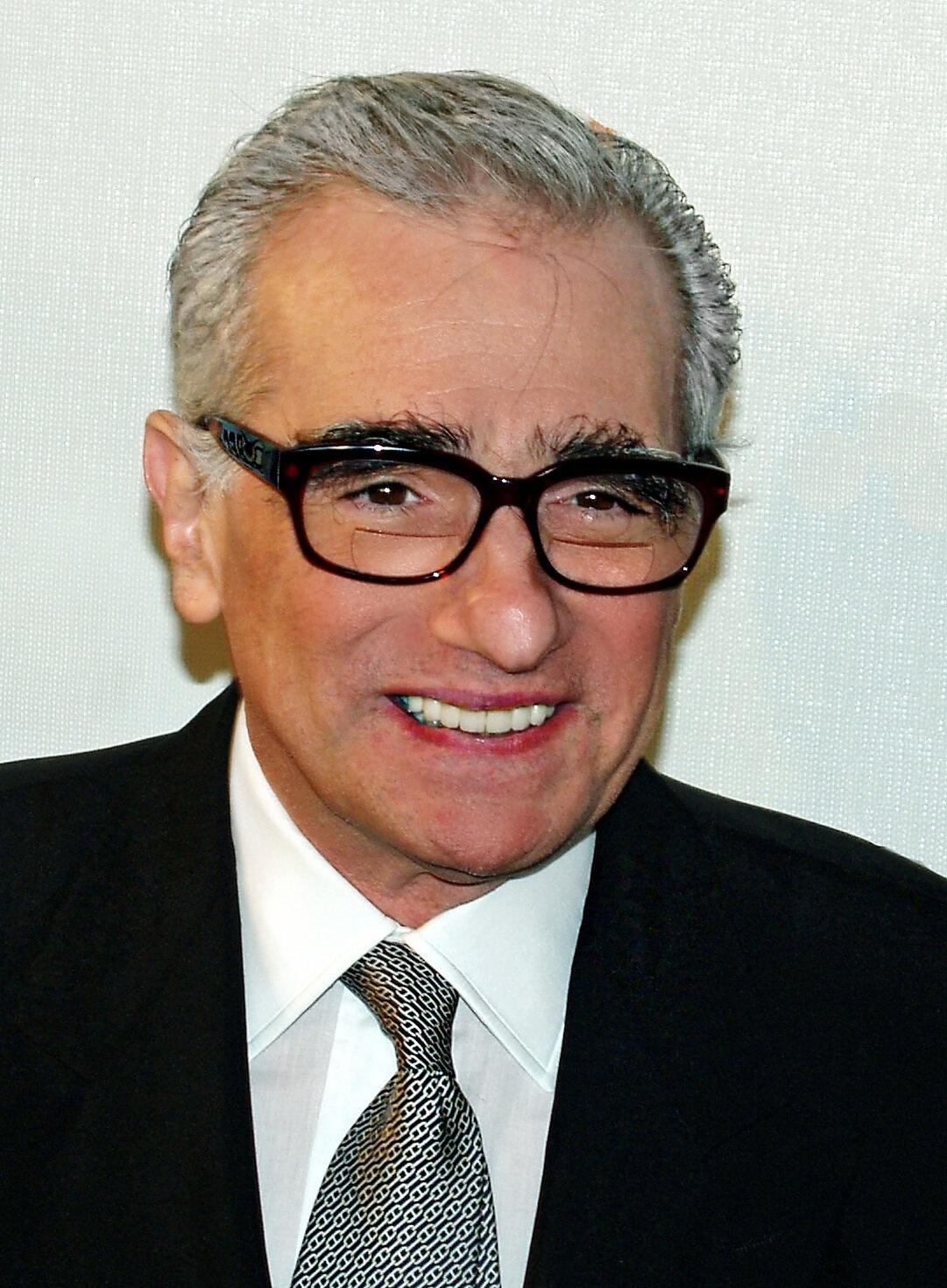
Martin Scorsese at the Tribeca Film Festival in 2007

One of the filmmakers most associated with New York is Woody Allen, whose films include Annie Hall and Manhattan. Other New Yorkers in film include the actor Robert De Niro, who started the Tribeca Film Festival after the terrorist attacks on September 11, 2001, and the directors Martin Scorsese, Francis Ford Coppola, Spike Lee, Jim Jarmusch, Joel and Ethan Coen, and many others.

While major studio productions are based in Hollywood, New York has become a capital of independent film. The city is home to a number of important film festivals, including the Tribeca Film Festival, the New York Film Festival and the Human Rights Watch Film Festival, as well as major independent film companies like Miramax Films. New York is also home to the Anthology Film Archives, which preserves and exhibits hundreds of avant-garde works from the entire span of film history.

The oldest public-access television in the United States is the Manhattan Neighborhood Network, well known for its eclectic local programming that ranges from a jazz hour to discussion of labor issues to foreign language and religious programming. There are eight other Public, educational, and government access (PEG) cable TV channels in New York, including Brooklyn Cable Access Television.

New York's municipally owned broadcast television service, NYC Media, creates original programming that includes Emmy Award-winning shows like Blue Print New York and Cool in Your Code, as well as coverage of New York City government. Other popular programs on NYC TV include music shows; New York Noise showcases music videos of local, underground, and indie rock musicians as well as coverage of major music-related events in the city like the WFMU Record Fair, interviews of New York icons (like The Ramones and Klaus Nomi), and comedian hosts (like Eugene Mirman, Rob Huebel, and Aziz Ansari). The Bridge, similarly, chronicles old school hip hop. The channel has won 14 New York Emmys and 14 National Telly awards.

== Stage performance ==
=== Dance ===
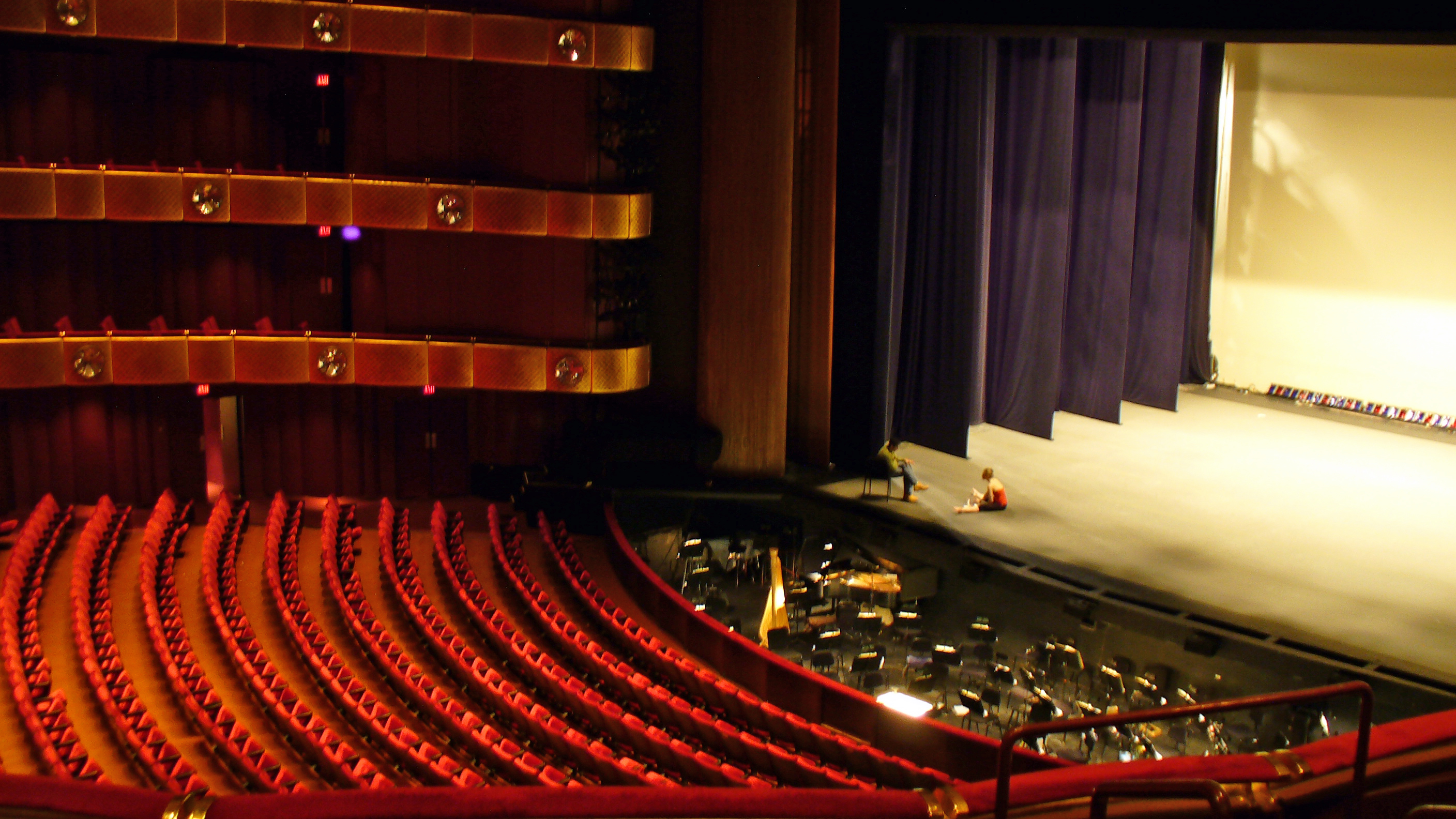
New York State Theater

The early 20th century saw the emergence of modern dance in New York, a new, distinctively American art form. Perhaps the best known figure in modern dance, Martha Graham, was a pupil of pioneer Ruth St. Denis. Many of Graham's most popular works were produced in collaboration with New York's leading composers – Appalachian Spring with Aaron Copland, for example. Merce Cunningham, a former ballet student and performer with Martha Graham, presented his first New York solo concert with John Cage in 1944. Influenced by Cage and embracing modernist ideology using postmodern processes, Cunningham introduced chance procedures and pure movement to choreography and Cunningham technique to the cannon of 20th century dance techniques. Cunningham set the seeds for postmodern dance with his non-linear, non-climactic, non-psychological abstract work. In these works each element is in and of itself expressive, and the observer determines what it communicates. George Balanchine, one of the 20th century's foremost choreographers and the first pioneer of contemporary ballet, formed a bridge between classical and modern ballet. Balanchine used flexed hands (and occasionally feet), turned-in legs, off-centered positions and non-classical costumes to distance himself from the classical and romantic ballet traditions. Balanchine also brought modern dancers in to dance with his company, the New York City Ballet; one such dancer was Paul Taylor, who in 1959 performed in Balanchine's piece Episodes. Another significant modern choreographer, Twyla Tharp, choreographed Push Comes To Shove for the American Ballet Theatre under Mikhail Baryshnikov's artistic directorship in 1976; in 1986 she created In The Upper Room for her own company. Both these pieces were considered innovative for their use of distinctly modern movements melded with the characteristics of contemporary ballet such as the use of pointe shoes and classically trained dancers.

New York has also historically been a center for African-American modern dance. Alvin Ailey, a student of Lester Horton (and later Martha Graham), spent several years working in both concert and theatre dance. In 1958 Ailey and a group of young African-American dancers formed the Alvin Ailey American Dance Theater. Alvin Ailey American Dance Theater performs annually at City Center Theater in New York. Ailey drew upon his memories of Texas, the blues, spirituals and gospel as inspiration. Bill T. Jones, winner of a MacArthur "Genius" Award in 1994, choreographed for the Alvin Ailey American Dance Theater, among others. Another significant African-American dancer, Pearl Primus, made her debut on February 24, 1943, at the 92nd Street Y as a social-protest dancer. Her concerns and expression fit into the landscape of the ongoing Harlem renaissance and gained much public support, and was immediately graced with attention after her first professional solo debut. Her dances were inspired by revolutionary African-American choreographer Katherine Dunham. Primus became known for her singular ability to jump very high while dancing. She focused on matters such as oppression, racial prejudice, and violence.

Breakdance, a well-known hip hop dance style, first appeared in African-American and Puerto Rican communities in the South Bronx in the early 1970s. Popular speculations of the early 1980s suggest that breakdancing, in its organized fashion seen today, began as a method for rival gangs of the ghetto to mediate and settle territorial disputes. In a turn-based showcase of dance routines, the winning side was determined by the dancers who could outperform the other by displaying a set of more complicated and innovative moves. It later was through the highly energetic performances of the late funk legend James Brown and the rapid growth of dance teams, like the Rock Steady Crew of the Bronx, that the competitive ritual of gang warfare evolved into a pop-culture phenomenon receiving massive media attention. Parties, disco clubs, talent shows, and other public events became typical locations for breakdancers, including gang members for whom dancing served as a positive diversion from the threats of city life.

Tap dancing originated in New York in the Five Points District.

=== Theatre ===
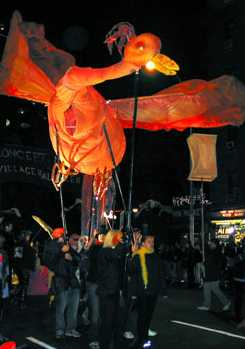
A Phoenix rises to new life at the Village Halloween Parade fifty days after the September 11, 2001, terrorist attacks

The advent of electric lighting led to elaborate theatre productions, and in the 1880s New York theaters on Broadway and along 42nd Street began to showcase a new stage form that came to be known as the Broadway musical. Strongly influenced by the feelings of immigrants to the city, these productions used song in narratives that often reflected themes of hope and ambition.

Many musicals in New York became seminal national cultural events, like the controversial 1937 staging of Marc Blitzstein's labor union opera The Cradle Will Rock, directed by Orson Welles and produced by John Houseman. Originally to open at the Maxine Elliott Theatre with elaborate sets and a full orchestra, the production was shut down on opening night, and Welles, Housman, and Blitzstein scrambled to rent the Venice Theatre twenty blocks north. The crowds gathered to see the production walked up 7th Avenue, and by nine o'clock the Venice Theatre's 1,742 seats were sold out. Blitzstein began performing the musical solo, but after beginning the first number he was joined by cast members, who were forbidden by the Actor's Union to perform the piece "onstage", from their seats in the audience. Blitzstein and the cast performed the entire musical from the house. Many who attended the performance, including poet Laureate Archibald MacLeish, thought it to be one of the most moving theatrical experiences of their lives. Performances of the musical to this day rarely use elaborate sets or an orchestra in homage to this event. Houseman and Wells went on to found the Mercury Theatre and do radio drama, in which they performed one of the most notable radio broadcasts of all time, The War of the Worlds.

Many New York playwrights, including Elia Kazan and Arthur Miller, became icons in American theater.

Professional Yiddish theatre in New York, a major cultural influence in the city, began in 1882 with a troupe founded by Boris Thomashefsky, an immigrant from Ukraine. The plays in the late 19th century were realistic, while in the beginning of the 20th century, they became more political and artistic in orientation. Some performers were well-respected enough to move back and forth between the Yiddish theatre and Broadway, including Bertha Kalich and Jacob Adler. Some of the major composers included Abraham Goldfaden, Joseph Rumshinsky and Sholom Secunda, while playwrights included David Pinski, Solomon Libin, Jacob Michailovitch Gordin and Leon Kobrin.

Concurrently with Yiddish theatre was the development of Vaudeville (a term thought to be a corruption of the old French word vaudevire, meaning an occasional or topical light popular song), a style of multi-act theatre which flourished from the 1880s through to the 1920s. An evening's schedule of performances (or "bill") could run the gamut from acrobats to mathematicians, from song-and-dance duos and Shakespeare to animal acts and opera. The usual date given for the "birth" of vaudeville is October 24, 1881, the night during which variety performer and theatre owner Tony Pastor, in his effort to lure women into the male-dominated variety hall, famously staged the first bill of self-proclaimed "clean" vaudeville in New York. African American audiences had their own Vaudeville circuits, as did speakers of Italian and Yiddish. The Palace Theatre on Broadway, described by its owner, Martin Beck, as "the Valhalla of vaudeville" opened with vaudeville shows from the Keith Circuit and lured the best and brightest in vaudeville. Its shift to a full bill of movies on November 16, 1932, is generally regarded as the death of vaudeville.

Today the 39 largest theatres (with more than 500 seats) in New York are collectively known as "Broadway" after the major thoroughfare through the Theater District, and are mostly located in the Times Square vicinity. Many Broadway shows are world-famous, such as the musicals Cats and The Phantom of the Opera. Along with those of London's West End, theaters in New York's Broadway district are often considered to be the most professional in the English language.

Smaller theatres, termed off Broadway and off-off-Broadway depending on their size, have the flexibility to produce more innovative shows for smaller audiences. An important center of the American theatre avant-garde, New York has been host to such seminal experimental theatre groups as The Wooster Group and Richard Foreman's Ontological-Hysteric Theater.

The subways of New York are also occasional venues for beauty pageants and guerrilla theater. The MTA's annual Miss Subways contest ran from 1941 to 1976 and again in 2004 (under the revised name "Ms Subways"). Past Miss Subways winners include Eleanor Nash, an FBI clerk described by her poster that hung in subway cars in 1960 as "young, beautiful and expert with a rifle". The 2004 Ms Subways winner, Caroline Sanchez-Bernat, was an actress who played a role in Sunday Brunch 4. The 35-minute piece of performance art was a full enactment of a Sunday brunch — including crisp white tablecloth, spinach salad appetizer and attentive waiter in black tuxedo — performed aboard a southbound A train in 2000. With subway riders looking on, the actors chatted amiably about Christmas, exchanged gifts and signed for a package delivered by a United Parcel Service delivery man who entered the scene at the West 34th Street stop.

==== Theatre companies ====
- Circle Repertory Company
- Classic Stage Company
- Great Jones Repertory Company
- Ma-Yi Theater Company
- No.11 Productions
- Pick Up Performance Company
- Roundabout Theatre Company

=== Stand-up comedy ===
New York is considered by many to be the heart of stand-up comedy in the United States. The city is home to a number of leading comedy clubs including Carolines.

== Literature ==
=== Novels ===
Several important movements originated in New York. One of the first American writers to gain critical acclaim in Europe, Washington Irving, was a New Yorker whose History of New York (1809) became a cultural touchstone for Victorian New York. Diedrich Knickerbocker, an old-fashioned Dutch New Yorker in Irvin's satire of chatty and officious logistical history, made "Knickerbocker" a bye-word for quaint Dutch-descended New Yorkers, with their old-fashioned ways and their long-stemmed pipers and knee-breeches long after the fashion had turned to trousers. This served as the inspiration for the New York Knicks's moniker, whose corporate name is the "New York Knickerbockers".

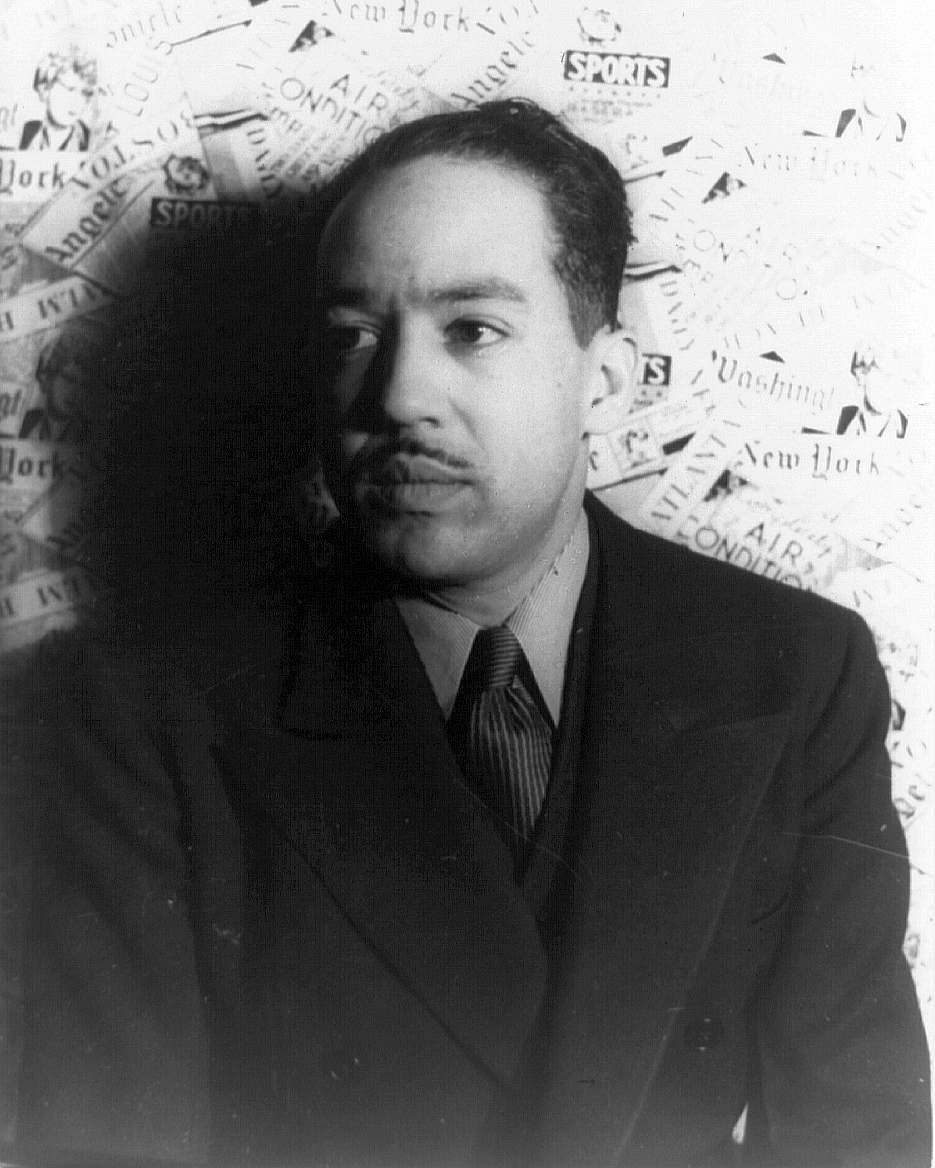
Langston Hughes was part of the Harlem Renaissance that flourished in the 1920s.

The Harlem Renaissance established the African-American literary canon in the United States. The zenith of this "flowering of Negro literature", as James Weldon Johnson called it, was between 1924, when Opportunity magazine hosted a party for black writers where many white publishers were in attendance, and the Wall Street Crash of 1929 and the start of the Great Depression. African-Americans of the northward Great Migration and African and Caribbean immigrants converged in Harlem, which became the most famous center of Negro life in the United States at that time. A militant black editor indicated in 1920 that "the intrinsic standard of Beauty and aesthetics does not rest in the white race" and that "a new racial love, respect, and consciousness may be created". The work of black Harlem writers sought to challenge the pervading racism of the larger white community and often promoted progressive or socialist politics and racial integration. No singular style emerged; instead there was a mix ranging from the celebration of Pan-Africanism, "high-culture" and "street culture", to new experimental forms in literature like modernism, to Classical music and improvisational jazz that inspired the new form of jazz poetry.

The mid-20th century saw the emergence of The New York Intellectuals, a group of American writers and literary critics who advocated leftist, anti-Stalinist political ideas and who sought to integrate literary theory with Marxism. Many of the group were students at the City College of New York in the 1930s and associated with the left-wing political journal The Partisan Review. Writer Nicholas Lemann has described the New York Intellectuals as "the American Bloomsbury". Writers often considered among the New York Intellectuals include Robert Warshow, Philip Rahv, William Phillips, Mary McCarthy, Dwight Macdonald, Lionel Trilling, Clement Greenberg, Irving Kristol, Sidney Hook, Irving Howe, Alfred Kazin, and Daniel Bell. The 1940s and 1950s also saw the rise in prominence of Ayn Rand, who was based in New York for many years and whose novels The Fountainhead and Atlas Shrugged were both set in the city.

Parallel and counter to these mainstream groups have been such New York-centered underground movements as the Beat poets and writers, including Allen Ginsberg, Jack Kerouac, Gregory Corso and others, continuing into the 1980s and beyond with such writers as Kathy Acker and Eileen Myles. Various movements down through the years have centered on avant-garde publishing enterprises such as Grove Press and Evergreen Review, as well as unnumbered zine-style pamphlets and one-off literary productions still available in independent bookstores today. At present the underground continues to thrive in the form of small press literary publishers, including Soft Skull Press, Fugue State Press, Dennis Cooper's Little House on the Bowery/Akashic Press, and many others.

Over the years many literary institutions have developed in the city, including PEN America, the largest of the international literary organization's centers. The PEN America plays an important role in New York's literary community and is active in defending free speech, the promotion of literature, and the fostering of international literary fellowship. Literary journals, including The Paris Review, The New York Review of Books, n+1, The New Criterion, and New York Quarterly are also important in the city's literary scene.

Contemporary writers based in the city, many of whom live in the Park Slope neighborhood of Brooklyn, include Norman Mailer, Barbara Garson, Don DeLillo, Jhumpa Lahiri, Paul Auster, Siri Hustvedt, Jonathan Safran Foer, Jonathan Lethem, Thomas Pynchon and many others. New York has also been a flourishing scene for Jewish American literature, as well as for Puerto Rican poets and writers, who call themselves "nuyoricans" (a blending of the phrases "New York" and "Puerto Rican"). The landmark Nuyorican Poets Café is a bastion of the Nuyorican Movement, an intellectual movement involving poets, writers, musicians and artists of Puerto Rican descent, mostly notably the late Pedro Pietri and Giannina Braschi.

While the state has an official poet Laureate, New York City does not. Instead, by tradition it hosts an annual "People's Poetry Gathering", curated by the City University of New York and city poetry groups, in which ordinary New Yorkers offer their own lines to an epic poem for the city. This technique was also used in the creation of a spontaneous poetic response by New Yorkers to the September 11, 2001 attacks that became a travelling exhibition called Missing: Streetscape of a City in Mourning. The poems, with 110 lines each for the 110 stories of the destroyed World Trade Center towers, were printed on black, billowing cotton banners over 25 feet (7.6 m) in height.

=== Comic books ===
The American comic book was invented in New York in the early 1930s as a way to cheaply repackage and resell newspaper comic strips, which also experienced their major period of creative growth and development in New York papers in the first decades of the 20th century. Immigrant culture in the city was the central topic and inspiration for comics from the days of Hogan's Alley, the Yellow Kid, The Katzenjammer Kids and beyond. Virtually all creators and workers employed in the early comic book industry were based in New York, from publishers to artists, many of them coming from immigrant Jewish families on the Lower East Side and in Brooklyn.

It can be argued that superheroes, the uniquely American contribution to comic books, owe their origin to New York, despite the fact that the first superhero, Superman, was created by two artists from Cleveland, Ohio. Even when not based explicitly in New York, superhero stories often make use of recognizable stand-ins for the city, such as Metropolis or Gotham City (Gotham being a common nickname for New York). The form and narrative conventions of superhero stories frequently dictate New York-sized cities as the settings, even generically.

Marvel Comics became famous for breaking with convention and setting their stories explicitly in a "real" New York, giving recognizable addresses for the homes of their major characters. Peter Parker, Spider-Man, lived with his Aunt May in Forest Hills, Queens. The Baxter Building, long-time home of the Fantastic Four, was located at 42nd and Madison Avenue. In 2007, the City of New York declared April 30-May 6 "Spider-Man Week" in honor of the release of Spider-Man 3. Both of the previous Spider-Man movies made heavy use of New York as a backdrop and included crowd scenes filled with "stereotypical New Yorkers".

New York also served as an inspiration and home for much of America's non-superhero comic books, famously starting with cartoonist and Brooklyn native Will Eisner's many depictions of everyday life among poor, working-class and immigrant New Yorkers. Today New York's alternative comics scene is thriving, including native New Yorkers Art Spiegelman, Ben Katchor and Dean Haspiel, graduates of the School of Visual Arts cartooning program (the first accredited cartooning program in the country) and many others.

Meanwhile, New York's comic book history has worked its way into other facets of New York culture, from the Pop Art of Roy Lichtenstein to the recent literary production of Brooklyn-based Jonathan Lethem and Dave Eggers.

== Museums ==
The Metropolitan Museum of Art is one of the world's largest and most important art museums, and is located on the eastern edge of Central Park. It also comprises a building complex known as "The Cloisters" in Fort Tryon Park at the north end of Manhattan Island overlooking the Hudson River which features medieval art. The Museum of Modern Art (MoMA) is often considered a rival to the Metropolitan Museum of Art. The Brooklyn Museum is the second largest art museum in New York and one of the largest in the United States. One of the premier art institutions in the world, its permanent collection includes more than one-and-a-half million objects, from ancient Egyptian masterpieces to contemporary art, and the art of many other cultures.

There are many smaller important galleries and art museums in the city. Among these is the Frick Collection, one of the preeminent small art museums in the United States, with a very high-quality collection of old master paintings housed in 16 galleries within the former mansion of steel magnate Henry Clay Frick. The collection features some of the best-known paintings by major European artists, as well as numerous works of sculpture and porcelain. It also has furniture, enamel, and carpets.

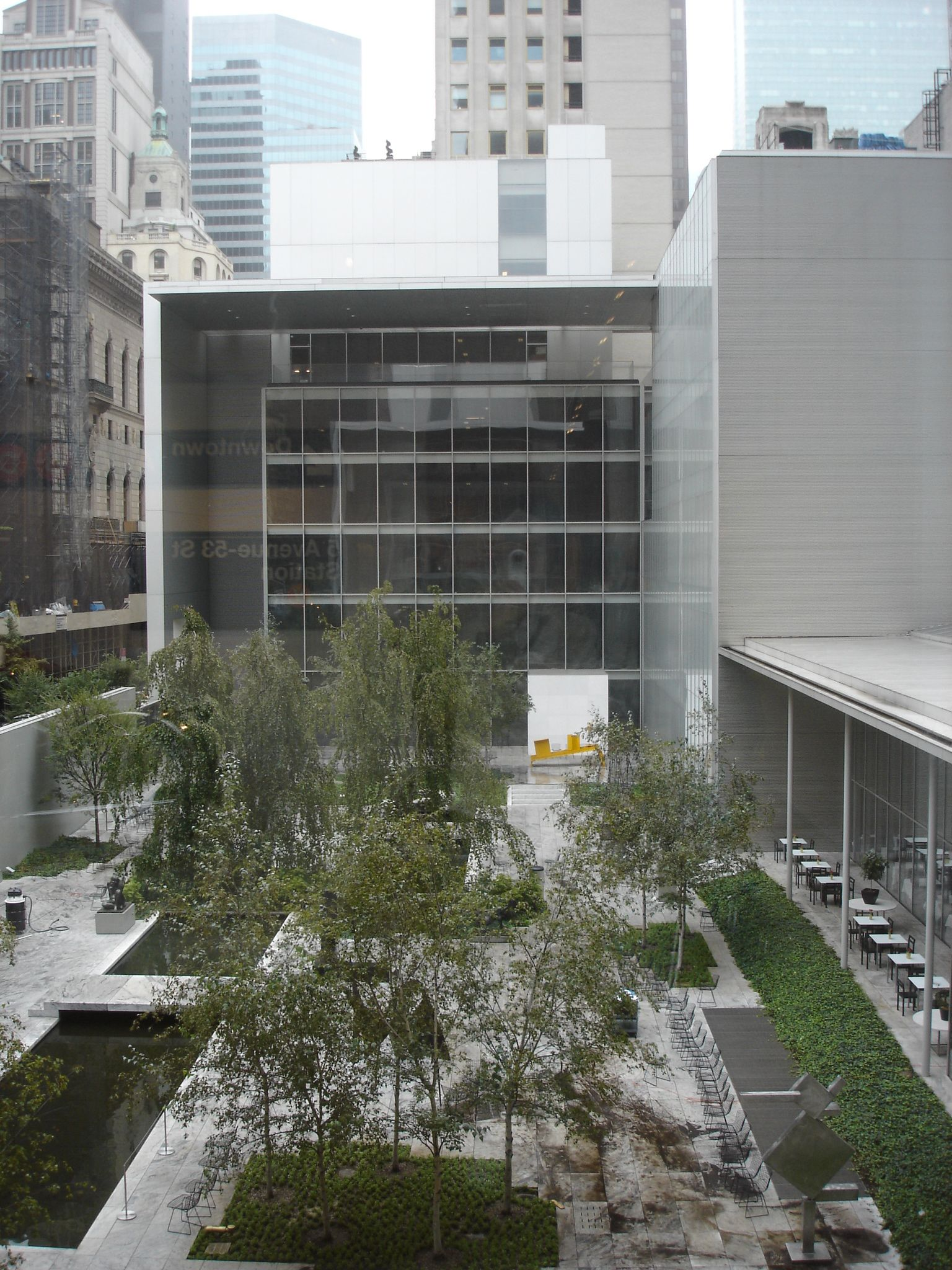
The Yoshio Taniguchi building at the Museum of Modern Art

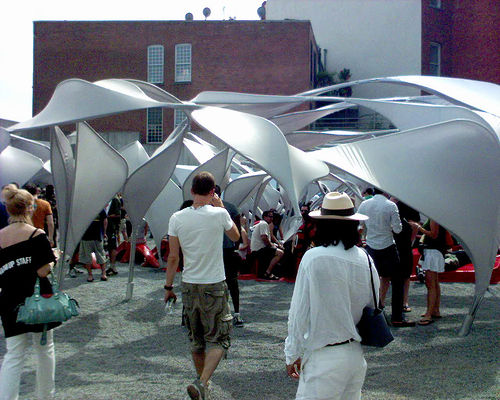
SUR by Xefirotarch at the P.S.1 Contemporary Art Center in Queens

The Jewish Museum of New York was first established in 1904, when the Jewish Theological Seminary received a gift a 26 Jewish ceremonial art objects by Judge Mayer Sulzberger. The museum now boasts a collection 28,000 objects including paintings, sculpture, archaeological artifacts, and many other pieces important to the preservation of Jewish history and culture.

Founded in 1969 by a group of Puerto Rican artists, educators, community activists and civic leaders, El Museo del Barrio is located at the top of Museum Mile in Spanish Harlem, a neighborhood also called 'El Barrio'. Originally, the museum was a creation of the Nuyorican Movement and Civil Rights Movement, and primarily functioned as a neighborhood institution serving Puerto Ricans. With the increasing size of New York's Latino population, the scope of the museum is expanding.

The American Museum of Natural History and its Hayden Planetarium focus on the sciences. There are also many smaller specialty museums, from the Cooper-Hewitt, National Design Museum to the International Center of Photography and The Museum of Television and Radio. There is even a Museum of the City of New York. A number of the city's museums are located along the Museum Mile section of Fifth Avenue.

In recent years New York has seen a major building boom among its cultural institutions. Long Island City in Queens is an increasingly thriving location for the arts, home to P.S.1 Contemporary Art Center and SculptureCenter for example. SculptureCenter, New York's only non-profit exhibition space dedicated to contemporary and innovative sculpture, re-located from Manhattan's Upper East Side to a former trolley repair shop in LIC, renovated by artist/designer Maya Lin in 2002. The museum commissions new work and presents challenging exhibits by emerging and established, national and international artists and hosts a diverse range of public programs including lectures, dialogues, and performances. In 2024 The Louis Armstrong House Museum won the prestigious National Medal for Museum and Library Service.

In 2006 more than 60 arts institutions spread across the five boroughs, from smaller community organizations like the Museum of Contemporary African Diasporan Arts in Brooklyn to major institutions like The Morgan Library & Museum, underwent architectural renovation or new construction. In aggregate the projects represented more than $2.8 billion in investment. The New York City Department of Cultural Affairs budget for building projects was the largest in the city's history: $865 million from 2006 through 2010, up from a $339.6 million planned budget for the 2001–4 period. The Alliance for the Arts, a nonpartisan, nonprofit arts advocacy and research group, reported in 2003 that the economic impact of cultural construction projects in New York — including factors like jobs created and collateral spending in the city — between 1997 and 2002 was $2.3 billion, with an anticipated impact of $2.7 billion for the period from 2003 through 2006.

== Inventions ==
New York City, like any other city across the United States and the world, has changed with its own unique inventions, among which are:

- Air conditioning
- Club sandwiches
- Jell-O
- Oreos
- Glow stick

== Cultural diversity ==
=== Demographics ===
Select Holy Days Officially Observed in New York City
Holy Day	Culture	Month (2006)
Eid al-Adha	Muslim	January
Asian Lunar New Year	East Asia	January
Ash Wednesday	Christian	March
Purim	Jewish	March
Nowruz	Iranian	March
Passover	Jewish	April
Good Friday	Christian	April
Shavuot	Jewish	June
Feast of Assumption	Catholic	August
Rosh Hashanah	Jewish	September
Yom Kippur	Jewish	September
Succoth	Jewish	October
Diwali	Hindu	October
Eid ul-Fitr	Muslim	October
All Saints' Day	Catholic	November
Eid al-Adha	Muslim	December

To some observers, New York, with its large immigrant population, seems more of an international city than something specifically "American". But to others, the city's very openness to newcomers makes it the archetype of a "nation of immigrants". The term "melting pot" derives from the play The Melting Pot, by Israel Zangwill, who in 1908 adapted Shakespeare's Romeo and Juliet to a setting in the Lower East Side, where droves of immigrants from diverse European nations in the early 1900s learned to live together in tenements and row houses for the first time. In 2000, 36% of the city's population was foreign-born. Among American cities this proportion was higher only in Los Angeles and Miami. While the immigrant communities in those cities are dominated by a few nationalities, in New York no single country or region of origin dominates. The seven largest countries of origin are the Dominican Republic, China, Jamaica, Russia, Italy, Poland and India.

The cultural diversity of New York can be seen in the range of official city holidays. With the growth of New York's South Asian community, Diwali, the Hindu Festival of Lights, was added to the calendar in 2022-2023.

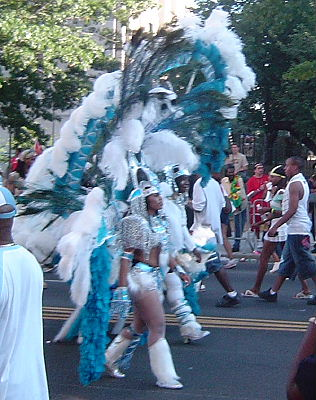
The West Indian Labor Day Parade is an annual carnival along Eastern Parkway in Brooklyn.

As in many major cities, immigrants to New York often congregate in ethnic enclaves where they can talk and shop and work with people from their country of origin. Throughout the five boroughs the city is home to many distinct communities of Indians, Irish, Italians, Chinese, Koreans, Dominicans, Puerto Ricans, Salvadorians, Caribbeans, Hasidic Jews, Latin Americas, Russians and many others. Many of the largest citywide annual events are parades celebrating the heritage of New York's ethnic communities. Attendance at the biggest ones by city and state politicians is politically obligatory. These include the St Patrick's Day Parade, probably the top Irish heritage parade in the Americas; the Puerto Rican Day Parade, which often draws up to 3 million spectators; the West Indian Labor Day Parade, among the largest parades in North America and the largest event in New York; and the Chinese New Year Parade. New Yorkers of all stripes gather together for these spectacles. Other significant parades include the Gay Pride Parade, Greenwich Village Halloween Parade and the Coney Island Mermaid Parade, all icons in the city's counter-culture pantheon.

New York has a larger Jewish population than any other city in the world, larger than even Jerusalem. Approximately one million New Yorkers, or about 13%, are Jewish. As a result, New York culture has borrowed certain elements of Jewish culture, such as bagels. The city is also home to the Jewish Theological Seminary of America, the headquarters of Orthodox Jewish movements, one of three American campuses of Hebrew Union College of Reform Judaism, Yeshiva University, and the home of the Anti-Defamation League. Temple Emanu-El, the largest Jewish house of worship in the world, became the first Reform congregation in America in 1845. It is also the home of such Jewish comedians as Woody Allen and Jerry Seinfeld.

=== Festivals and parades ===
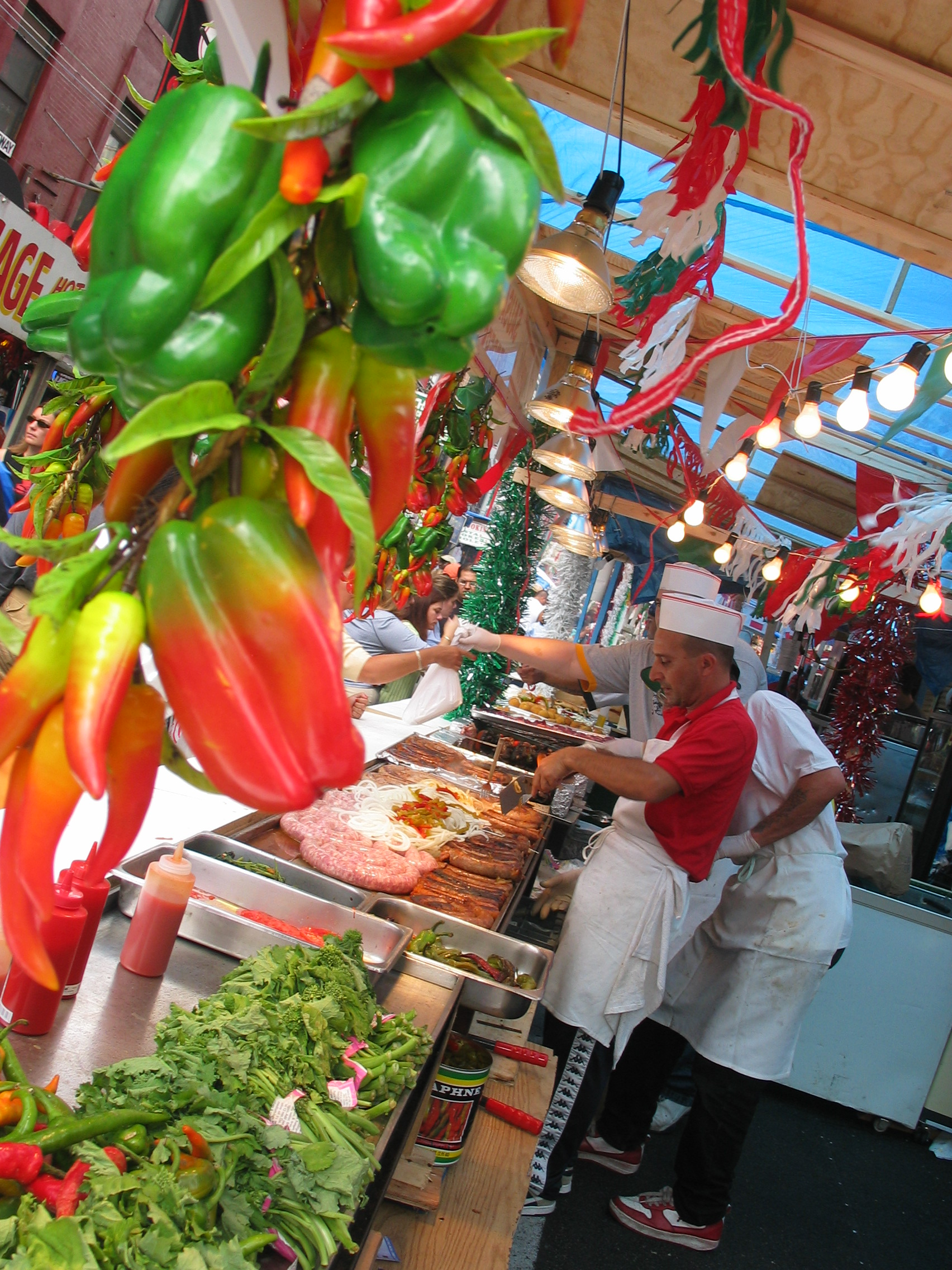
Street vendors at the Feast of San Gennaro in Little Italy, Lower Manhattan

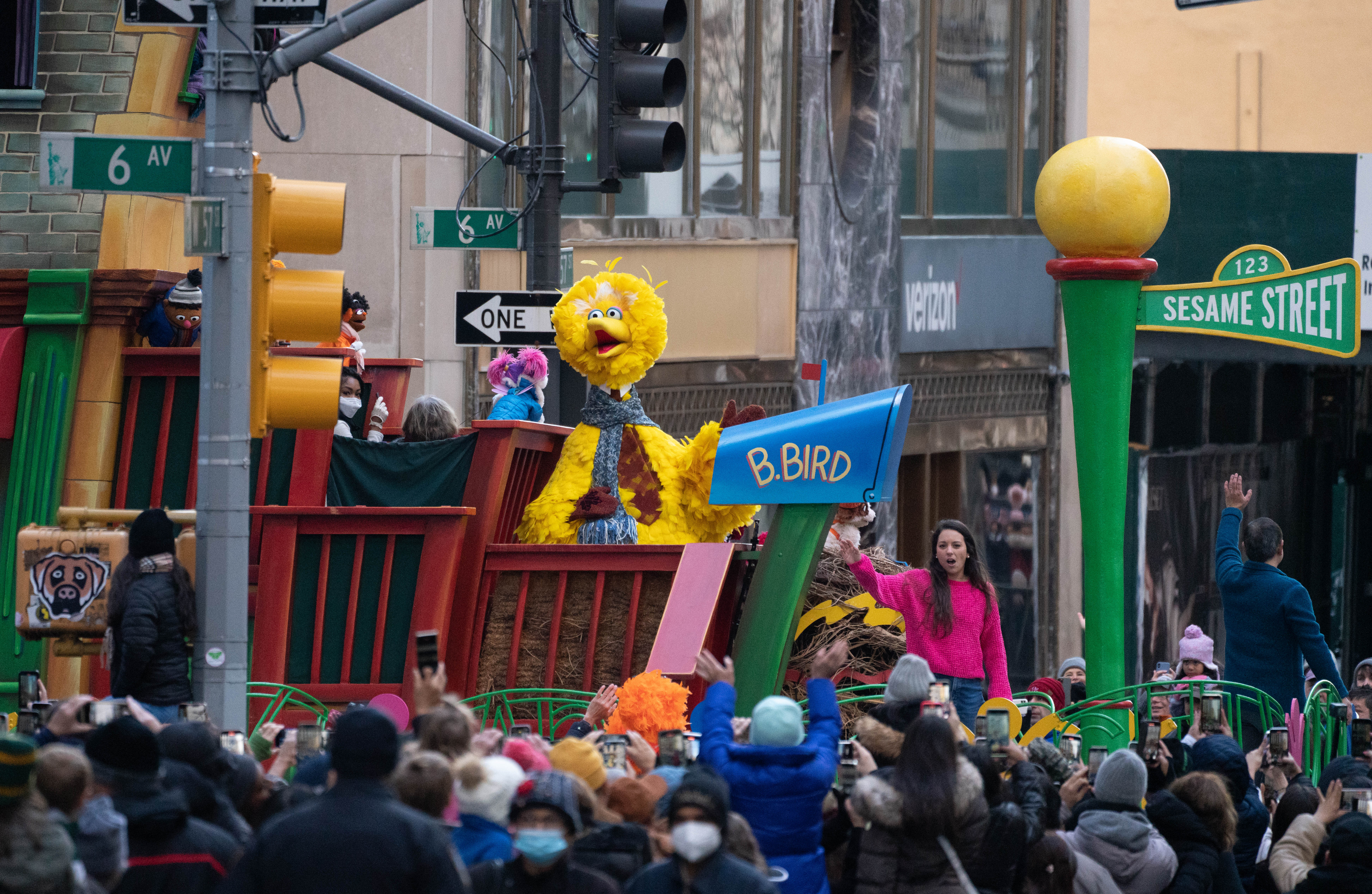
The Macy's Thanksgiving Day Parade is the world's largest parade.

New York, with its many ethnic communities and cultural venues, has a large number of major parades and street festivals. SummerStage in Central Park is one of about 1,200 free concerts, dance, theater, and spoken word events citywide sponsored by the City Parks Foundation.

The Village Halloween Parade is an annual holiday parade and street pageant presented the night of every Halloween (October 31) in Greenwich Village. Stretching more than a mile, this cultural event draws two million spectators, fifty thousand costumed participants, dancers, artists and circus performers, dozens of floats bearing live bands and other musical and performing acts, and a worldwide television audience of one hundred million.

The Feast of San Gennaro, originally a one-day religious commemoration, is now an 11-day street fair held in mid-September in Manhattan's Little Italy. Centered on Mulberry Street, which is closed to traffic for the occasion, the festival generally features parades, street vendors, sausages and zeppole, games, and a religious candlelit procession which begins immediately after a celebratory mass at the Church of the Most Precious Blood. Another festival is held with the same attractions at New York's other Little Italy, in the Fordham/Belmont area in the Bronx. The streets are closed to traffic and the festivities begin early in the morning and proceed late into the night.

Other major parades include the annual Macy's Thanksgiving Day Parade, the world's largest parade, presented by Macy's Department Store and lasting three hours on Thanksgiving Day, which features enormous inflatable balloons, and Puerto Rican Day Parade which is held along Fifth Avenue (Manhattan) from 44th Street to 86th Street. The parade also extends through other ethnic Puerto Rican neighborhoods throughout the city in Brooklyn and the Bronx.

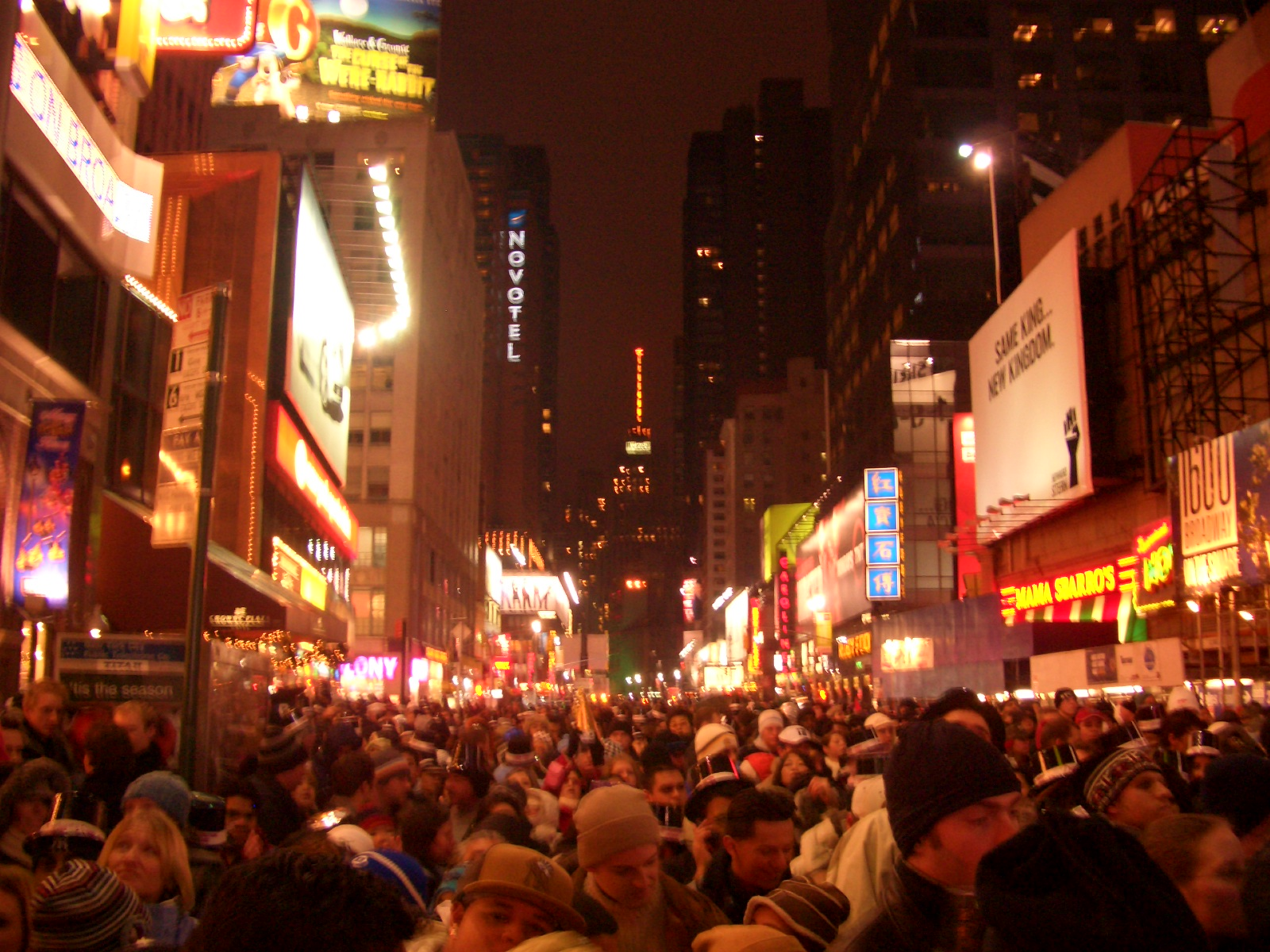
A crowd in Times Square awaits the countdown to the start of 2006.

The largest New Year's Eve celebration in the world is the "ball dropping" on top of One Times Square that is broadcast live on national television. A 1,070-pound, 6-foot-diameter Waterford Crystal ball, high above Times Square, is lowered starting at 23:59:00 and reaching the bottom of its tower at the stroke of midnight (00:00:00). New York Harbor From 1982 to 1988, New York dropped a large apple in recognition of its nickname, "The Big Apple". Dick Clark hosted televised coverage of the event from 1972 to 2011 with his show, Dick Clark's New Year's Rockin' Eve. For about four decades, until one year before his death in 1977, Canadian violinist and bandleader Guy Lombardo and his Royal Canadians serenaded the United States from the ballroom of the Waldorf-Astoria Hotel on Park Avenue. Their recording of the traditional song Auld Lang Syne still plays as the first song of the new year in Times Square.

== Sports ==
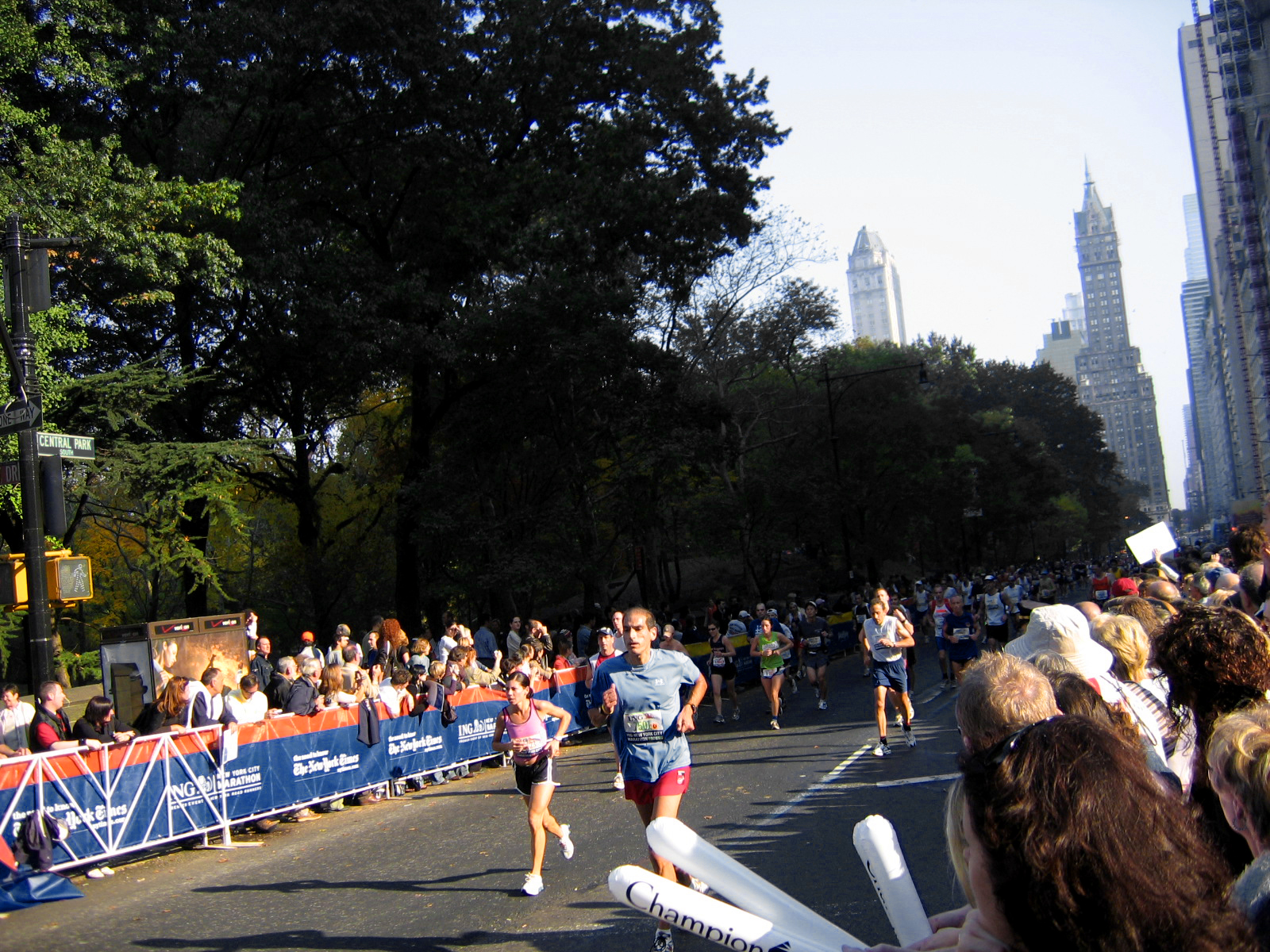
The New York City Marathon is the largest marathon in the world.

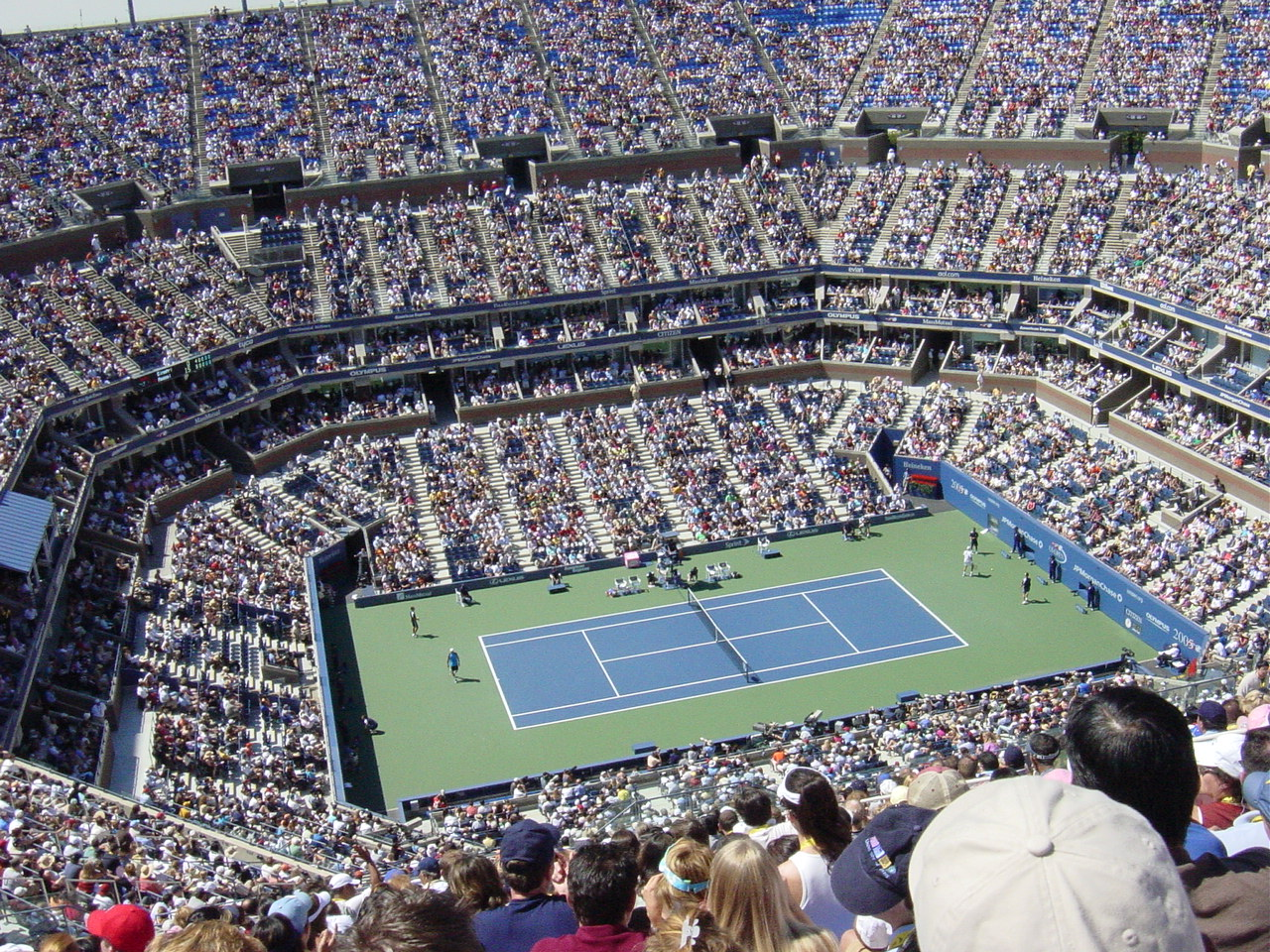
The US Open Tennis Championships are held every August and September in Flushing Meadows-Corona Park, Queens.

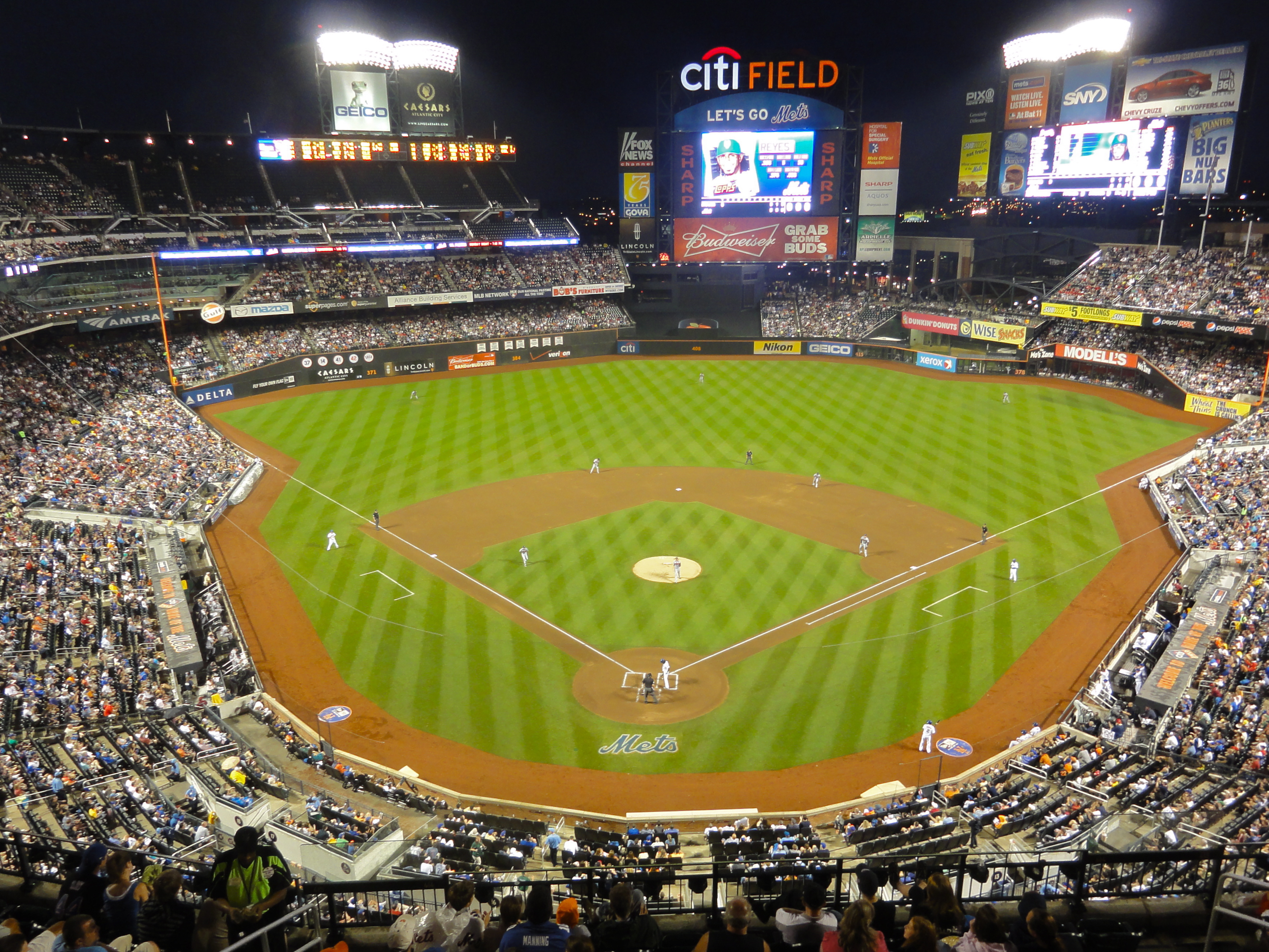
Citi Field, also in Flushing Meadows-Corona Park, has been home to the New York Mets since 2009.

New York is home to the headquarters of the National Football League, Major League Baseball, the National Basketball Association, the National Hockey League, and Major League Soccer. The New York metropolitan area hosts the most sports teams in these five professional leagues. Five of the ten most expensive stadiums ever built worldwide (MetLife Stadium, the new Yankee Stadium, Madison Square Garden, Citi Field, and Barclays Center) are located in the New York metropolitan area.

=== Baseball ===
New York has been described as the "Capital of Baseball". There have been 35 Major League Baseball World Series and 73 pennants won by New York teams. It is also one of only five metro areas (Los Angeles, Chicago, Baltimore–Washington, and the San Francisco Bay Area being the others) to have two major league teams. Additionally, there have been 14 World Series in which two New York teams played each other, known as the Subway Series and occurring most recently in 2000. No other metropolitan area has had this happen more than once (Chicago in 1906, St. Louis in 1944, and the San Francisco Bay Area in 1989).

The city's two current MLB teams are the New York Mets and the New York Yankees, who compete in four games of interleague play every regular season that has also come to be called the Subway Series. The Yankees have won a record 27 championships, while the Mets have won the World Series twice. The city also was once home to the Brooklyn Dodgers (now the Los Angeles Dodgers), who won the World Series once, and the New York Giants (now the San Francisco Giants), who won the World Series five times. Both teams moved to California in 1958. There are also two Minor League Baseball teams in the city, the Brooklyn Cyclones and Staten Island Ferryhawks.

=== Football ===
The city is represented in the NFL by the New York Giants and the New York Jets, although both teams play their home games at MetLife Stadium in nearby East Rutherford, New Jersey, which hosted Super Bowl XLVIII in 2014.

The New York Rangers represent the city in the NHL. The New York Islanders, who originally played in Nassau County on Long Island, and moved to the Barclays Center in 2015. Also within the metropolitan area are the New Jersey Devils, who play in nearby Newark, New Jersey.

=== Basketball ===
The city's NBA teams include the Brooklyn Nets and the New York Knicks, while the city's Women's National Basketball Association team is the New York Liberty. The first national college-level basketball championship, the National Invitation Tournament, was held in New York in 1938 and remains in the city.

The Basketdolls is a recreational basketball league established in June 2024 in New York City. Founded by Devin Myers, the organization operates primarily in Brooklyn's Bushwick neighborhood and serves transgender participants. The league conducted its inaugural season from June 1 to September 2024, hosting 15 meetings at various public courts throughout New York City. As of 2024, the organization conducts its activities primarily on public basketball courts throughout New York City's five boroughs.

=== Soccer ===
In soccer, New York is represented by New York City FC of MLS, who play their home games at Yankee Stadium. The New York Red Bulls play their home games at Red Bull Arena in nearby Harrison, New Jersey. Historically, the city is known for the New York Cosmos, the highly successful former professional soccer team which was the American home of Pelé, one of the world's most famous soccer players.

=== Tennis ===
Queens is host of the U.S. Open Tennis Championships, one of the four annual Grand Slam tournaments.

=== Track and field ===
The New York Marathon is one of the world's largest, and the 2004–2006 events hold the top three places in the marathons with the largest number of finishers, including 37,866 finishers in 2006. The Millrose Games is an annual track and field meet whose featured event is the Wanamaker Mile.

=== Boxing ===
Boxing is also a prominent part of the city's sporting scene, with events like the Amateur Boxing Golden Gloves being held at Madison Square Garden each year.

=== Additional sports ===
Many sports are associated with New York's immigrant communities. Stickball, a street version of baseball, was popularized by youths in the 1930s. A street in Clason Point in the Bronx has been renamed Stickball Boulevard, as tribute to New York's most known street sport.

== In popular culture ==
Because of its sheer size and cultural influence, New York has been the subject of many different, and often contradictory, portrayals in mass media. From the sophisticated and worldly metropolis seen in many Woody Allen films, to the hellish and chaotic urban jungle depicted in such movies as Martin Scorsese's Taxi Driver, New York has served as the backdrop for virtually every conceivable viewpoint on big city life.

In the early years of film, New York was characterized as urbane and sophisticated. By the city's crisis period in the 1970s and early 1980s, however, films like Midnight Cowboy, The French Connection, Dog Day Afternoon, Taxi Driver, Marathon Man, Cruising, Dressed to Kill, and Death Wish showed New York as full of chaos and violence. With the city's renaissance in the 1980s and 1990s came new portrayals on television; Friends, Seinfeld, and Sex and the City showed life in the city to be glamorous and interesting. Nonetheless, a disproportionate number of crime dramas, such as Law & Order, continue to make criminality in the city as their subject even as New York has become the safest large city in the United States in the 2000s and 2010s.

== See also ==
- Culture of The Bronx
- Culture of Brooklyn
- Culture of Manhattan
- Culture of Queens
- Culture of Staten Island
- Alliance for the Arts
- LGBT culture in New York City
- List of nightclubs in New York City
- List of people from New York City
- Media in New York City
- New York City arts organizations
- Public Art Fund
- Transgender culture of New York City
