= Arthur Ellsworth =

Arthur Ellsworth can refer to:

== People ==
- Arthur E. Foote (born 1874), American tennisist
- Arthur Ellsworth Summerfield (1899–1972), American politician
- A.E. Dick Howard (born 1933), American legal scholar
- A. Whitney Ellsworth (1938–2011), American editor and publisher

== Books ==
- Clarence Arthur Ellsworth [1885–1961]; gifted painter of Indians, 1961 book by Bertha Parker Pallan
- Clarence Arthur Ellsworth,: Artist of the Old West, 1885–1964, 1967 book by Otha Wearin
