= Sallie Bingham =

American dramatist (1937–2025)

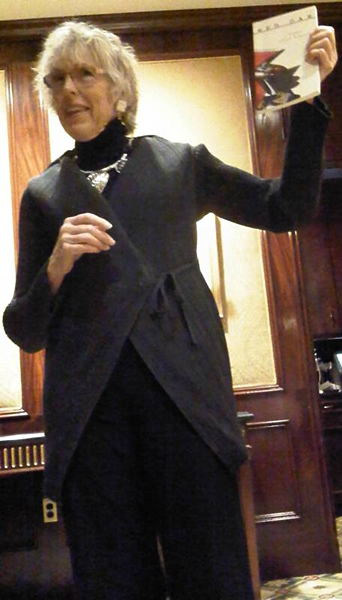
- Bingham at a reading for Red Car, 2010
- Born: January 22, 1937; Louisville, Kentucky, U.S.
- Died: August 6, 2025 (aged 88); Santa Fe, New Mexico, U.S.
- Education: Radcliffe College
- Occupation: Writer
- Relatives: Barry Bingham Sr. (father)
- Writing career
- Genres: Short story, novel, poetry, drama, memoir

Sarah Montague "Sallie" Bingham (January 22, 1937 – August 6, 2025) was an American author, playwright, poet, teacher, feminist activist, and philanthropist. She was the eldest daughter of Barry Bingham Sr.

== Early life ==
She was born Sarah Montague Bingham in Louisville, Kentucky, on January 22, 1937. After growing up in Louisville, she received a BA in English from Radcliffe College in Massachusetts. Having met A. Whitney Ellsworth in college, she married him and they lived together in Boston, having one child, now-film producer Barry Ellsworth. She then moved to New York after finishing her first novel and she and Ellsworth divorced.

== Career ==
Sallie Bingham's first novel, After Such Knowledge, was published by Houghton Mifflin in 1960. It was followed by six collections of short stories, seven additional novels, three collections of poetry, and eight plays (produced off-Broadway and regionally). She also wrote three family memoirs: Passion and Prejudice (Knopf, 1989), The Blue Box (Sarabande Books, 2014), and Little Brother (Sarabande Books, 2022).

Her short stories have appeared in The Atlantic Monthly, Greensboro Review, The Connecticut Review, and Southwest Review, among others, and have been anthologized in Best American Short Stories, Forty Best Stories from Mademoiselle, Prize Stories: The O. Henry Awards, and The Harvard Advocate Centennial Anthology. She received fellowships from Yaddo, the MacDowell Colony, and the Virginia Center for the Creative Arts.

Bingham worked as a book editor for The Courier-Journal in Louisville and was a director of the National Book Critics Circle. She was the founder of the Kentucky Foundation for Women, which published The American Voice. In 1988, she endowed a women's studies archivist position at the Duke University Special Collections Library. This position eventually became the Sallie Bingham Center for Women's History and Culture in 1999.

In the 1980s, Bingham sat on the board of the newspaper company run by her family, whose publications included The Courier-Journal and The Louisville Times. Dissatisfied with how the company treated women and racial minorities who worked there, her political activity brought her into direct conflict with her brother, Barry Bingham Jr., who by then led the board. Barry Bingham Jr. eventually expelled all his family members from the board and Sallie Bingham responded by putting her shares up for public sale, which eventually led the Bingham family to divest entirely from the newspaper business in 1986, selling the company.

== Later life and death ==
Bingham was married three times: to publisher A. Whitney Ellsworth, attorney Michael Iovenko, and contractor Tim Peters. She had three sons—Barry Ellsworth, William Iovenko, and Christopher Iovenko—and five grandchildren.

Bingham died from a stroke at her home in Santa Fe, New Mexico, on August 6, 2025, at the age of 88. Her last book, the story collection How Daddy Lost His Ear, was published posthumously by Turtle Point Press in September 2025.

== Bibliography ==
=== Memoirs ===
- Passion and Prejudice (Knopf, 1989)
- The Blue Box: Three Lives in Letters (Sarabande Books, 2014)
- Little Brother: A Memoir (Sarabande Books, 2022)

=== Other nonfiction ===
- The Silver Swan: In Search of Doris Duke (Farrar, Straus and Giroux, 2020)

=== Short story collections ===
- The Touching Hand (Houghton Mifflin, 1967)
- The Way It Is Now (Viking Press, 1972)
- Transgressions (Sarabande Books, 2002)
- Red Car (Sarabande Books, 2008)
- Mending: New and Selected Stories (Sarabande Books, 2011)
- Treason: A Sallie Bingham Reader (Sarabande Books, 2020) (also includes a novella and a play)
- How Daddy Lost His Ear: And Other Stories (Turtle Point Press, 2025)

=== Novels ===
- After Such Knowledge (Houghton Mifflin, 1960)
- Small Victories (Zoland Books, 1992)
- Upstate (Permanent Press, 1993)
- Matron of Honor (Zoland Books, 1994)
- Straight Man (Zoland Books, 1996)
- Cory's Feast (Sunstone Press, 2005)
- Nick of Time (Sunstone Press, 2007)
- Taken by the Shawnee (Turtle Point Press, 2024)

=== Poetry collections ===
- The High Cost of Denying Rivers Their Floodplain (privately published, 1995)
- The Hub of the Miracle (Sunstone Press, 2006)
- If in Darkness (Tebot Bach, 2010)

=== Plays ===
- Milk of Paradise (Women's Project Theater, New York, 1980)
- Couvade (Actors Theatre of Louisville, Kentucky, 1983)
- Paducah (Women's Project Theater, New York, 1985)
- In the Presence (Goucher College, Maryland, 1984; Mill Mountain Theatre, Virginia, 1986)
- Hopscotch (Horse Cave Theatre, Kentucky, 1986)
- The Awakening (Horse Cave Theater, Kentucky, 1988)
- Treason (Perry Street Theatre, New York, 2006)
- A Dangerous Personality (Perry Street Theatre, New York, 2008)

=== Selected work reprinted in anthologies ===
- "Winter Term" in Identity: Stories for this Generation, ed. Katherine Hondius (Scott, Foresman and Co., 1966)
- "The Banks of the Ohio" in Prize Stories 1964: The O. Henry Awards, ed. Richard Poirier (Doubleday, 1966)
- "Mending" in Solo: Women on Woman Alone, eds. Linda Hamalian and Leo Hamalian (Delacorte Press, 1977)
- "A New Life" in American Wives: 30 Short Stories by Women, ed. Barbara Solomon (Signet, 1987)
- "Pleyben" in New Stories by Southern Women, ed. Mary Ellis Gibson (University of South Carolina Press, 1989)
- "Milk of Paradise" in Playwriting Women: 7 Plays from the Women's Project and Productions, ed. Julia Miles (Heinemann Drama, 1993)
- "Bare Bones" in Home and Beyond: An Anthology of Kentucky Short Stories, ed. Morris A. Grubbs (The University Press of Kentucky, 2001)
- "Apricots" in The Kentucky Anthology: Two Hundred Years of Writing in the Bluegrass State, ed. Wade Hall (University Press of Kentucky, 2005)
