= Peter Gadol =

American author (born 1964)

- Born: Peter Daniel Gadol; April 15, 1964 (age 62); Summit, New Jersey, United States
- Education: Harvard College (AB)
- Occupations: Novelist, educator
- Known for: Fiction

Peter Gadol (born April 15, 1964), is an American novelist, and educator. He is chair and professor of MFA writing program at Otis College of Art and Design in Los Angeles.

== Early life and education ==
Peter Daniel Gadol was born on April 15, 1964, in Summit, New Jersey, and grew up in Westfield, New Jersey.

He received an A.B. magna cum laude in English and American literature from Harvard College in 1986. While at Harvard College, he studied writing with Seamus Heaney, and wrote a thesis on Wallace Stevens under the supervision of Helen Vendler. He also edited the literary magazine The Harvard Advocate, and served for two years as an intern in fiction at The Atlantic.

== Career ==
Gadol is the author of seven books. His debut novel, Coyote, published by Crown in 1990, was hailed by The Los Angeles Times as "the work of an energetic mind, one seemingly unfettered by fashionable norms," and his second novel, The Mystery Roast (Crown, 1993), was described by The Washington Post as "a savory spoof of trends, but ultimately...a love story involving secrets and dreams, anxieties about fulfillment and intimacy and the Muses that inspire us nonetheless."

Closer to the Sun, published by Picador USA in 1996, was inspired by Gadol's move to Los Angeles. It tells the story of a young couple who, after having lost their home in a canyon wildfire, enlist the help of a drifter to rebuild the house themselves, the drifter himself overcoming the loss of a lover to AIDS.

In The Long Rain (Picador USA, 1997), Gadol returned to California, this time wine country, to write a literary thriller about a lawyer who defends a man wrongly accused of committing a crime the lawyer himself committed. The novel was translated into several languages and nominated for a prize from PEN West.

Light at Dusk (Picador USA, 2000), is set in the Paris of a slightly near-future in which the far right has ascended and white power skinhead gangs freely roam the streets. The daylight abduction of a Lebanese boy causes a young American ex-diplomat to re-enter the morally questionable world he abandoned in order to find the child. LA Weekly applauded the novel for its "elegant, but mannered prose; tight, suspenseful plotting; moody Parisian setting; fearlessly high-modernist concerns," and claimed the novel "will not look out of place slouching on the shelf somewhere between Joseph Conrad and Graham Greene."

Gadol's sixth novel Silver Lake, was published by Tyrus Books in September 2009. Silver Lake is about two architects, two men turning forty who have been involved professionally and personally for twenty years, and who are beginning to see their practice and their marriage falter. One day, a peculiar young man drifts into their storefront office claiming he has car trouble, asking to use the phone. The men get to talking; the young stranger is curious but enchanting, and one of the architects ends up playing tennis with him that afternoon, ultimately inviting him home for dinner. The ensuing evening involves a lot of wine and banter and then increasingly dark conversation, and when the stranger has had too much to drink, the two men insist he sleep in their guest room. During the night, the stranger commits an act of violence which shatters the architects' ordered lives, each man in his own way over the days and months that follow coping with blossoming doubt and corrosive secrets. The reviewer for Booklist wrote: "In his trademark crystalline prose, reminiscent of Patricia Highsmith, Gadol vividly illustrates the universal themes of the stranger who comes to town, the quest for redemption, and the entanglement of deception." Silver Lake was nominated for awards from the Southern California Independent Booksellers Association and Lambda Literary.

The Stranger Game, a novel about a woman who is drawn into a dangerous game following random strangers, was published on October 2, 2018, by Hanover Square Press, an imprint of HarperCollins. The reviewer for Kirkus called the book a "beautiful, thoughtful meditation on the invisible ties that bind us—even to strangers." The Stranger Game has been optioned by FX to be developed as a television series.

His short fiction has appeared in Story, Tin House, StoryQuarterly, Bloom, and the Los Angeles Review of Books Quarterly Journal. He has taught at UCLA and the California Institute of the Arts.
