= Middle-market company =

Category of business

A middle-market or mid-market company is one that is larger than a small business and smaller than a big business. Different authorities use different metrics to compare company sizes — some look at revenue, others at either asset size or number of employees — with the result that different authorities give different definitions of the "middle market".

Definitions of the middle market are generally derived by dividing the United States economy into three categories: small business, middle-market, and big business. According to figures collected by the U.S. Census Bureau, the total revenue of all U.S. businesses in 2012 was roughly $32.6 trillion. The largest of these companies, which are big businesses with revenue of over $3 billion, make up roughly one-third of that total, and businesses with a revenue of under $100 million made up about another third of the total revenue. The middle market can thus be defined as the companies larger than small businesses but smaller than big businesses that account for the middle third of the U.S. economy's revenue.

Other authorities define middle-market firms differently. The National Center for the Middle Market at the Ohio State University Fisher College of Business as well as Dun & Bradstreet’s proprietary database of commercially-active U.S. firms define middle market businesses as those companies with revenues between $10 million and $1 billion per year. The definition is defined in reference to small businesses, which earn less than $10 million in annual revenue, and big business, which earn at least $1 billion in revenues and are generally the smallest eligible for a credit rating by one of the "major" credit-rating agencies. Investopedia considers middle market firms to be those with sizable annual revenues, ranging from $50 million to $1 billion, which straddle the market between smaller companies and billion-dollar giants.

== In the United States ==
The 200,000 plus US-based mid-market companies are essential to America's economic success. They account for $10 trillion annually of the $30 trillion U.S. private sector gross receipts and 30 million jobs. If the U.S. middle market were a country, its GDP would rank it as the fourth-largest economy in the world.

== In Europe ==
Mid-market companies—companies that are too big to be considered SMEs, but smaller than big, exchange listed businesses—play a key role in the UK and in the other top European economies.

According to an in depth report by ESSEC Business School and GE Capital, across the UK, Germany, France and Italy (the EU-4), the mid-market represents a relatively small number of companies (ranging from a low of 1.2% in Germany to 1.7% in France) and yet it generates about one third of private sector revenue and employs about a third of each country's workforce. Combined, the middle market in the four European countries contributes €1.11 trillion ($1.48 trillion) to the EU-4 GDP. This makes the middle market in the EU-4 one of the top 10 economies in the world, ahead of India and Russia.

In the study, Professor Ashwin Malshe of ESSEC defined the middle market differently for each country. For example, Italy has 3.7 million firms with revenue of less than€5 million, while Germany has only 1.7 million companies this size this means that applying a single European or global definition of a mid-market firm is difficult. In the UK, mid-market firms are those with between £15m and £800m of annual revenues.

The average UK middle market firm has revenue of £78 million (€98 million) and employs 500 people, similar in size to its German counterparts but larger than the typical mid-market firm in France or Italy.

== Middle-market organizations ==
Entities have evolved to serve businesses in the middle market, including for-profit and institutions of higher learning. In the latter category, the Graziadio School of Private Capital Markets at Pepperdine University produces quarterly and annual data on the middle market via their Private Capital Markets Project. Other entities include the Association for Corporate Growth (ACG), which provides a global community for mergers, acquisitions, and corporate growth professionals. ACG's stated objective is to drive middle-market growth. ACG publishes Middle Market Growth online. International alliances such as Alliott Group bring together independent local practices that offer professional services (accounting, tax and legal) to middle market companies targeting growth through expansion to the international marketplace.

== See also ==
- Free float
- List of finance topics
