= No.11 Productions =

American non-profit theater company

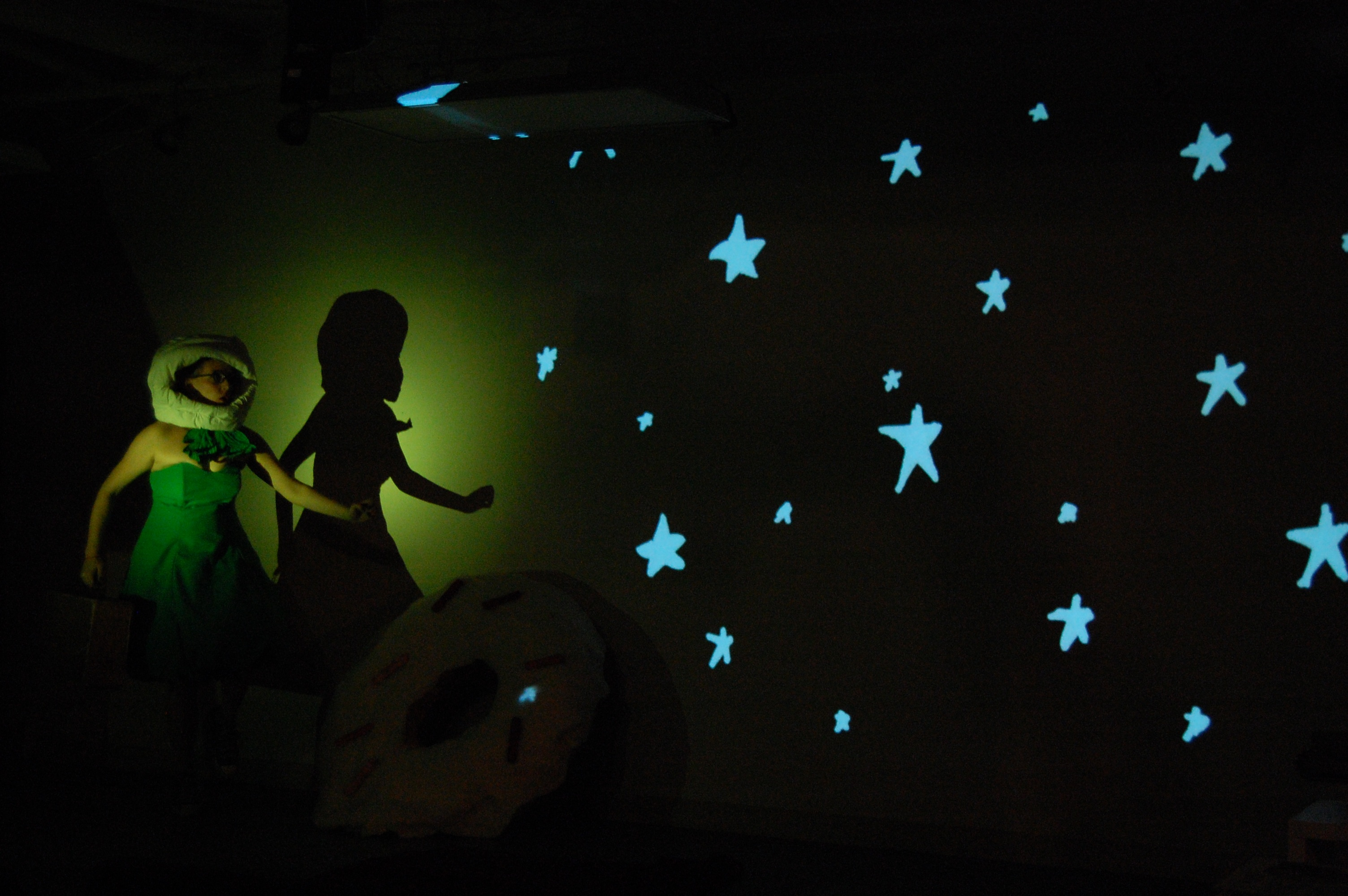
Haley Greenstein in No.11 Production's "Coosje."

No. 11 Productions is a non-profit 501(c)(3) theatre company based in New York City. The company's productions have been reviewed by The Washington Post, NYTheatre.com, The Happiest Medium, BroadwayWorld, and DCTheatreScene.com. No.11 Productions has produced works at the New York International Fringe Festival, FRIGID New York, Kentucky Repertory Theatre, Fringe Wilmington, The Bushwick Starr, @Seaport, Capital Fringe Festival, 14th Street Theatre, Van Cortlandt Park, and SaratogaArtsFest.

== History ==
No.11 Productions was founded in 2008 by Skidmore College alumni Julie Congress, Mitchell Conway, Erin Daley, Ryan Emmons and Jen Neads. The company has produced eleven full-length productions, ten staged readings, a music video and a fundraiser.

== Full Production Timeline ==
=== 2012 ===
- Quest for the West: Adventures on the Oregon Trail!
- MythUnderstood
- Coosje

=== 2011 ===
- A Christmas Carol
- 11-11-11 Cabaret Gala
- MythUnderstood
- Quest for the West: Adventures on the Oregon Trail!
- Lysistrata
- Places

=== 2010 ===
- Cat People
- Lysistrata
- Assemblywomen
- Cogito
- Medea

=== 2009 ===
- Lysistrata
- Claire and the Ornithological Shadow
- The Elephant Man - The Musical
- Seaport the Arts Fundraiser
- MythUnderstood
- Jet of Blood
- 11 Celebrates 10 Reading Series

=== 2008 ===
- Claire and the Ornithological Shadow
- We Three
- Lysistrata
