= Abandon (film) =

- Theatrical release poster
- Directed by: Stephen Gaghan
- Written by: Stephen Gaghan
- Based on: Adams Fall by Sean Desmond
- Produced by: Gary Barber; Roger Birnbaum; Lynda Obst; Edward Zwick
- Starring: Katie Holmes; Benjamin Bratt; Charlie Hunnam; Zooey Deschanel; Gabrielle Union; Gabriel Mann; Melanie Lynskey; Will McCormack; Fred Ward
- Cinematography: Matthew Libatique
- Edited by: Mark Warner
- Music by: Clint Mansell
- Production companies: Spyglass Entertainment; Lynda Obst Productions
- Distributed by: Paramount Pictures (North America); Spyglass International (International)
- Release date: October 18, 2002
- Running time: 99 minutes
- Country: United States
- Language: English
- Budget: $25 million
- Box office: $12.3 million

Abandon is a 2002 American psychological thriller drama film written and directed by Stephen Gaghan in his directorial debut. It follows a college student (Katie Holmes) whose boyfriend (Charlie Hunnam) disappeared two years previously. Despite being set at an American university, much of the movie was filmed in Montreal, Quebec at McGill University's McConnell Hall. It is based on the book Adams Fall by Sean Desmond. The book was re-titled Abandon for the movie tie-in paperback printing. The film co-stars Zooey Deschanel, Gabrielle Union, and Melanie Lynskey, with Benjamin Bratt playing the detective who is investigating the boyfriend's disappearance.

Abandon was released by Paramount Pictures on October 18, 2002 in the United States and by Spyglass International in other territories. It was a critical and commercial failure, grossing $12.3 million against a $25 million budget.

== Plot ==
Brilliant, senior college student Katie Burke is struggling to deal with the stress of completing her thesis and succeeding in an upcoming rigorous interview process. To make matters even more complicated, Detective Wade Handler, a recovering alcoholic, is tasked with reopening the two-year-old police investigation into the disappearance of her boyfriend, Embry Larkin. An orphaned young man of considerable means, Larkin had purchased two tickets to Athens, Greece before his disappearance: the tickets had never been used, and Embry's financial assets had not been touched since his disappearance. Katie begins to see Larkin lurking around campus, stalking her.

In her meetings with Detective Handler, Katie tells him about her seeing Larkin. He continues his investigation even though his preliminary conclusion is that Larkin is, indeed, dead. She supplies to Handler notes that Larkin had written to her, a two-year-old note and a note scribbled on a postcard ad, presumably new. Handler takes them to a forensics expert who finds that they are both two years old.

Along with flashbacks of her early childhood when her father abandoned her and her mother, Katie also has flashbacks of her relationship with Embry Larkin, which are exciting and pleasurable at first but then become violent. Handler finds out that Larkin was hostile toward Katie's male friends on campus. One of these friends, Harrison, an admirer of Katie, turns up missing until he is seen with Katie and her other friends on their graduation day.

Katie has encounters or, possibly, flashbacks of being with Embry Larkin either in a café, the college library, or at the Larkin family country house. She is trying to find Harrison, whom she thinks Larkin has abducted or killed. After a violent encounter with Larkin, Katie flees the country house and goes to Detective Handler's home. She finds comfort with him, and they begin to have a relationship.

Handler resigns from the police force, intending to retreat to his cabin in New Hampshire, possibly with Katie, who hints to her friends that she might take a year break from college. Just as he leaves on his last day, the forensic expert gives him the troubling results of his analysis of Embry Larkin's two notes. Handler is devastated to realize that Katie is mentally ill, and he starts drinking again.

Handler keeps his rendezvous with Katie on campus near the old, abandoned college hall that will shortly be demolished to make room for a new building. Katie tells him that Embry Larkin had assaulted her and gone to the abandoned hall. Handler goes into the lower level of the hall in search of Larkin. Katie follows him. In the course of the search, Katie has a flashback of her actual last meeting with Larkin.

Larkin tells her that he does not want to take her to Athens and dismisses her as unappealing to him. In anger, Katie kills Larkin with a rock and pushes his body into a deep pool of water. Handler tenderly confronts Katie in her hallucination, telling her that there is nothing there. Like Larkin two years before he tells Katie that she cannot come with him, and that he will find help for her.

Handler spots Larkin's skeleton in the deep pool. Katie then kills Handler with a rock as she did Larkin, pushing his body into the pool. As a psychotic, traumatized by being abandoned by her father, Katie killed the two men who would dare abandon her again. The demolition of the old building and the construction of the new building would hide the bodies.

Fast forward to after Katie's graduation: she is employed by the financial firm that interviewed her, presumably facilitated by a romantic relationship with a young, senior employee, who is close to being made a partner. He tells her that since company rules forbid "interoffice romance," he needs to break off his relationship with her. A familiar look passes over Katie's face.

== Cast ==
- Katie Holmes as Katie Burke
- Benjamin Bratt as Detective Wade Handler
- Charlie Hunnam as Embry Larkin
- Zooey Deschanel as Samantha Harper
- Fred Ward as Lieutenant Bill Stayton
- Mark Feuerstein as Robert Hanson
- Melanie Lynskey as Julie 'Mousy Julie'
- Philip Bosco as Professor Jergensen
- Gabriel Mann as Harrison Hobart
- Gabrielle Union as Amanda Luttrell
- Tony Goldwyn as Dr. David Schaffer

== Release ==
=== Box office ===
The film opened at #7 at the U.S. box office, taking $5,064,077 in its first opening weekend.

=== Critical reception ===
Reception was largely negative. Rotten Tomatoes judged the film to have a 16% "rotten" critical approval rating based on 114 reviews, with an average score of 4.28/10, with the consensus stating: "The plotline for Abandon is too disjointed and muddled to offer much in the way of thrills." On Metacritic, the film's score is 36/100 based on 26 reviews, indicating generally unfavorable reception. Variety magazine described it as "a tricked-up Fatal Attraction wannabe".

Audiences polled by CinemaScore gave the film an average grade of "D" on an A+ to F scale.

== See also ==
- Adams Fall, a novel by author Sean Desmond, which served as a loose basis for the plot of Abandon
