= The American Voice =

- Founding Editors: Frederick Smock and Sallie Bingham
- Frequency: Quarterly
- Publisher: Kentucky Foundation for Women
- First issue: 1985
- Final issue: 1999
- Country: United States
- Based in: Louisville, Kentucky
- Language: English
- ISSN: 0884-4356

The American Voice was an American literary magazine published in Louisville, Kentucky. The journal featured poetry, short stories, and essays.

== Background and content ==
The American Voice was founded in 1985 by Frederick Smock and Sallie Bingham while they were both part-time teachers at the University of Louisville. When the two started discussing making a literary journal, they initially thought of naming it "Other Voices," to represent the Latin Americans, regionalists, women, and other minority writers they liked. When their friend Frank MacShane suggested they locate the journal more centrally by calling it "The American Voice," Smock and Bingham adopted the title immediately.

The journal has been described as feminist in orientation as it highlights the work of women and marginalized writers in general. Contributors come from the U.S., Canada and Latin America. They featured well-known and obscure writers alike. Some of the well-known writers The American Voice published include: Marge Piercy, Wendell Berry, Jorge Louis Borges, Elaine Equi, Isabel Allende, Fenton Johnson, Kay Boyle, Joyce Carol Oates, Reynolds Price, Anne Firor Scott, Jo Carson, Doris Grumbach, Paula Gunn Allen, Robin Morgan, Minnie Bruce Pratt, and Joy Harjo.

The founding editors' primary goal was to promote marginalized writers who could not publish through literary establishments—especially those who were denied access to mainstream journals.
