= Kentucky Repertory Theatre =

Horse Cave Theatre
- Interactive map of Horse Cave Theatre
- Former names: Kentucky Repertory Theatre
- Address: 107 E. Main St. Horse Cave, Kentucky; United States
- Coordinates: 37.1795°N 85.9071°W
- Capacity: 346
- Type: Repertory

Construction
- Opened: June 10, 1977
- Years active: 1977-2013

Website
- http://www.horsecavetheatre.com

Kentucky Repertory Theatre was a theater company located in Horse Cave, Kentucky, United States. The company was located in two former commercial buildings in the city's downtown area.

KRT was formed as Horse Cave Theatre in 1976, and was a novelty for its time: a professional theater company located in a small rural town, producing a series of plays in a repertory cycle. The theater's proximity to the Mammoth Cave National Park tourist area was hoped to help attract theatergoers, and that has been proven to be the case over the years, though the theater enjoys substantial support from the town's residents as well, as those in neighboring Cave City, Glasgow, Munfordville and other surrounding cities.

The primary season for KRT was originally in the summer, when tourism business in the area is at its peak. In recent times, the company shifted its season to a period between autumn and Christmas, while continuing to present a single production in the summer to attract tourists. Over the years, KRT productions have run the gamut of theater, from George Bernard Shaw to Neil Simon, with one play by William Shakespeare being featured nearly every season. The company has also encouraged works by Kentucky playwrights, including at least one such work in its repertory nearly every season. Sallie Bingham, a descendant of the Bingham family of Louisville (former owners of The Courier-Journal and numerous other media properties), has had three of her plays produced by KRT.

The theater was housed in two renovated buildings, and seated 346 people in its main auditorium. An entrance building, built to resemble a tobacco barn typically found in southern Kentucky, was added at the opening. In 1998, the company purchased a residential building for office space, and a nearby warehouse for scenery and prop construction. The main theater buildings are listed on the National Register of Historic Places. In 2004 the theatre rebranded itself to Kentucky Repertory Theatre at Horse Cave.

Warren Hammack was KRT's first artistic director, serving the company for 25 years until his retirement.

He was succeeded by the director, Robert Brock. Brock was the Artistic Director of Kentucky Repertory Theatre from 2002 to 2011. In that time he produced 86 plays, 11 of them were new scripts premiering at the theatre. Under his directorship, the theatre's Educational Outreach Programs tripled the number of students impacted (15,000 students in 22 counties annually). He created the very popular and successful Young Performers Program in 1999 and produced and directed 14 shows involving middle and high school students from the region. The Young Performers Program produced a number of young actors that went on to receive theatre scholarships to colleges and universities nationwide. 9 Young Performers were accepted into the Governor's School for the Arts. Brock also initiated a cooperative program with T J Samson Hospital and Barren County Drug Prevention to address health issues with young people in the region. The program was called Project HEAT (Health Education Awareness Theatre) and produced three plays that toured to schools. These plays offered an entertaining and imaginative approach to looking at substance use, bullying and hygiene. In 2008 Brock accepted the Governor's Arts Award on behalf of KRT. While Brock was Artistic Director, KRT received many accolades, among them being named "one of the Top Ten small regional theatres in the nation" by USA Today. The Theatre's Educational Outreach Program was written up in the Cincinnati Enquirer, The Indianapolis Star, The Evansville Courier, and The Dallas Morning News. While Brock was Director, KRT was commissioned by the Kentucky Humanities Council and the Kentucky Abraham Lincoln Bicentennial Commission to produce two plays about Lincoln ( Abraham Lincoln and One Man's Lincoln) during the bicentennial years 2008–2009. Mr Brock performed with Annie Potts in 2 productions of Love Letters in 2002 and 2003 that played in Horse Cave, Elizabethtown and Bowling Green, and directed Sally Struthers in another production of Love Letters in 2010. He was succeeded by Christopher Carter Sanderson for one season. For the 2013 season, RepALLIANCE under the direction of Ken Neil Hailey took over the producing duties. In May 2013, the theatre was closed due to debt that had built up over a number of the later seasons. The theatre and its board suspended operations while the core directors and actors who produced the successful final season moved on and formed a new company, Kentucky Stage(s), in residence at Bowling Green's new SKyPAC (Southern Kentucky Performing Arts Center) during the 2013–14 season. Kentucky Stage(s) observed the process after closure and attempted to reacquire and restore the theatre, re-re-branding the facility again as THE HORSE CAVE THEATRE. Plans to reopen the theatre by the summer of 2015 were unsuccessful.
