= National Center for the Middle Market =

Research center in Ohio State University

The National Center for the Middle Market (NCMM) is a research center located at The Ohio State University Fisher College of Business. The center conducts research about and for middle market companies. The center focuses its efforts on research, outreach, events, student programs, and policy to spread awareness of the middle market, which is defined as businesses with revenues from $10 million to $1 billion.

Thomas A. Stewart is the Executive Director of the NCMM.

The NCMM was created in 2011 out of a partnership between the Fisher College of Business and GE Capital. It works on a variety of academic research each year. The center publishes the quarterly Middle Market Indicator as a check of middle market businesses, with over 1,000 senior executives of middle market companies surveyed on questions about revenue and employment growth, plans to invest, and other areas of concern.
