= A. Whitney Ellsworth =

American editor and publisher

Arthur Whitney Ellsworth (May 31, 1936, Manhattan – June 18, 2011, Salisbury, Connecticut) was an American editor and publisher best known as the first publisher of The New York Review of Books.

In 1957, Ellsworth was President of The Harvard Advocate. After graduating with a bachelor's degree from Harvard University in 1958 he began his career as an editor at The Atlantic Monthly. In 1963 he became the first publisher of The New York Review of Books; a post he maintained until his retirement in December 1986. He thereafter worked as managing partner of the publishing firm The Lakeville Journal Company. In 1979 he founded the London Review of Books. His first marriage to writer Sallie Bingham ended in divorce.

From 1976 to 1978, Ellsworth served as chairman of Amnesty International USA, devising a method of greatly increasing the organization's size and capabilities by setting up a direct-mail fund-raising operation. He also served as treasurer of the group for several years.

Ellsworth died of pancreatic cancer.
