= Caleb Crain =

American writer

- Education: Harvard University; Columbia University
- Occupations: Novelist, non-fiction
- Spouse: Peter Terzian
- Writing career
- Period: 1990s–present
- Notable works: American Sympathy, Necessary Errors

Caleb Crain is an American writer, who was a Lambda Literary Award nominee in the Gay Fiction category at the 26th Lambda Literary Awards in 2014 for his debut novel Necessary Errors.

A graduate of Harvard University and Columbia University, Crain has published book reviews and essays in publications including The New Yorker, The New York Review of Books, The London Review of Books, The Nation, The New York Times Book Review, Out and The New Republic. He also published the non-fiction book American Sympathy: Men, Friendship, and Literature in the New Nation in 2001.

He lives in New York City with his husband, blogger and editor Peter Terzian.

== Bibliography ==
=== Books ===
- Crain, Caleb (2001). American sympathy : men, friendship, and literature in the new nation.
- Crain, Caleb (2013). Necessary Errors: a novel.
- Crain, Caleb (2019). Overthrow: a novel

=== Essays and reporting ===
- Crain, Caleb (September 12, 1999). "There but for Fortune : Hearts in Atlantis By Stephen King". The New York Times.
- Crain, Caleb (December 17, 2007). "Twilight of the Books". The New Yorker.
- Crain, Caleb (October 28, 2013). "Four legs good : the life of Jack London". The Critics. Books. The New Yorker. Vol. 89, no. 34. pp. 73–77.
- — (November 7, 2016). "None of the above : the case against democracy". The Critics. Books. The New Yorker. Vol. 92, no. 36. pp. 67–71.
