= Thomas A. Stewart (journalist) =

American journalist

Thomas A. Stewart (born 1948) is the Executive Director of the National Center for the Middle Market (NCMM) at the Fisher College of Business at The Ohio State University. He joined the NCMM after a stint as Chief Marketing and Knowledge Officer of management consulting firm Booz & Company. Prior to joining Booz & Company, he was the editor and managing director of Harvard Business Review (HBR) from 2002-2008. Prior to joining HBR, he was editorial director of Business 2.0 and a member of the Board of Editors of Fortune magazine.

In a series of Fortune articles, Thomas Stewart pioneered the field of intellectual capital, which led to his 1997 book, Intellectual Capital: The New Wealth of Organizations. His second book, Wealth of Knowledge: Intellectual Capital and the Twenty-first Century Organization, reveals how today’s companies are applying the concept of intellectual capital in their operations to increase success in the marketplace. In 2016, he published "Woo, Wow, and Win: Service Design, Strategy, and the Art of Customer Delight", co-authored with Patrica O'Connell . Stewart is a member of the Advisory Council of the Information and Knowledge Strategy master's degree program at Columbia University. He is also a fellow of the World Economic Forum.

In 2005, the European Foundation for Management Development named him seventeenth on its “Thinkers 50” list of the 50 most influential management thinkers. He is the recipient of a number of awards, including the Gay and Lesbian Alliance Against Defamation Media Award in 2002, the Champion of Workplace Learning and Performance Award from the American Society for Training and Development in 1999, and the Blue Chip Newsroom Award of best business journalists from the Journal of Financial Reporting in 1993.

Stewart graduated summa cum laude from Harvard College with a B.A. in English Literature. In 2004, he was awarded an honorary Doctor of Sciences Degree from Cass Business School, City University, London.
