= Adams Fall =

Benjamin Stylea

- First edition hardcover
- Author: Sean Desmond
- Language: English
- Genre: Thriller
- Publisher: St. Martin's Press
- Publication date: October 2000 (First ed.)
- Publication place: United States
- Media type: Print (Hardcover)
- Pages: 245 pp
- ISBN: 978-0-312-26254-9
- OCLC: 44128214
- Dewey Decimal: 813/.6 21
- LC Class: PS3554.E842 A64 2000

Adams Fall is writer Sean Desmond's first novel. It recounts the events which occur to a college student in his senior year at Harvard University. In the midst of completing his thesis and applying for a study abroad program, the narrator copes with his stresses by resorting to alcohol and other drugs.

Adams House, a real House at Harvard, features prominently in the novel; the author is himself a Harvard graduate.

The novel was the (loose) basis for the 2002 film Abandon starring Katie Holmes.

The novel appears to have been republished with the movie title in 2016 - 9781250124449
