= Zephine Humphrey =

American writer

Zephine Humphrey Fahnestock
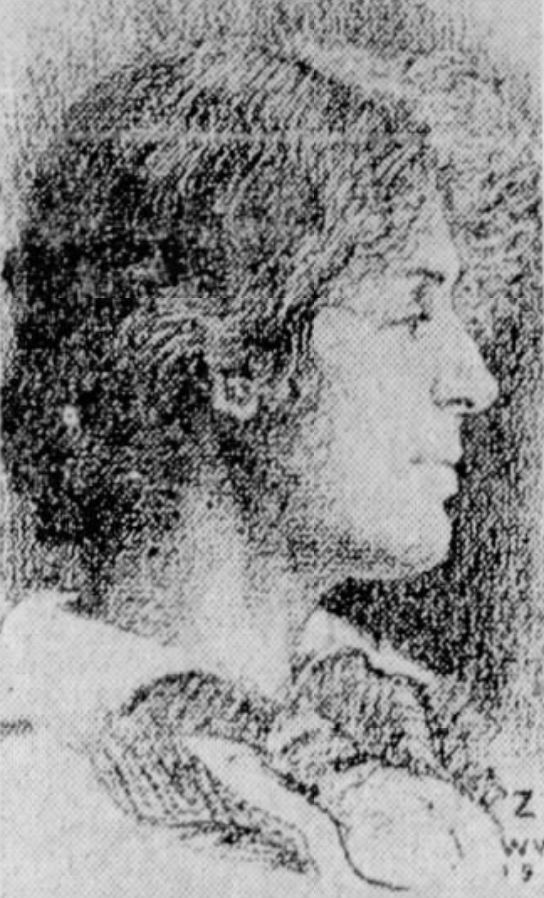
- Zephine Humphrey Fahnestock, from a 1919 newspaper
- Born: December 15, 1874; Philadelphia, Pennsylvania
- Died: 1956 (aged 81–82); Dorset, Vermont
- Occupation: Writer
- Relatives: Heman Humphrey (grandfather), Edward Porter Humphrey (uncle); James Humphrey (uncle); Edward William Cornelius Humphrey (cousin), Alexander Pope Humphrey (cousin)

Harriette Zephine Humphrey Fahnestock (December 15, 1874 – November 14, 1956), usually writing as Zephine Humphrey, was an American writer based in Vermont.

== Early life and education ==
Harriette Zephine Humphrey was born in Philadelphia in 1874, the daughter of Zephaniah Moore Humphrey and Harriet (Hattie) Lee Sykes Humphrey. Her mother was a lecturer who influenced Jane Addams. Her grandfather was Heman Humphrey, the second president of Amherst College. Presbyterian leader Edward Porter Humphrey and politician James Humphrey were her uncles. Her first cousins included Presbyterian scholar Edward William Cornelius Humphrey and judge Alexander Pope Humphrey. She graduated from Smith College in 1896. She traveled in Europe for two years after college, with her widowed mother.

== Career ==
Humphrey was known as a prolific writer of fiction and essays with regional, nature, travel, and religious themes. The New York Times wrote in a 1938 review that "she writes the entire first chapter of her travel book about her husband's sciatica and makes it a thoroughly charming introduction". She was often associated with fellow Vermont writers Dorothy Canfield Fisher and Sarah Norcliffe Cleghorn. She worked with them on political causes including the abolition of the death penalty, and traveled with both women to Rome. Poet Robert Frost called the three women "Vermont's Three Verities". She objected to the creation of the Green Mountain Parkway, noting that, "Alone among the New England States, Vermont still retains a measure of freedom from the opportune standards of the present day." She was active with the Vermont Children's Aid Society.

== Publications ==
=== Books ===
- The Calling of the Apostle (1900)
- Uncle Charley (1902)
- The Story of Mary Mecome (1906)
- Over Against Green Peak (1908, 1911)
- Recollections of my Mother (1912)
- The Edge of the Woods and other Papers (1913)
- Grail Fire (1917)
- The Homestead (1919)
- The Sword of the Spirit (1920)
- Mountain Verities (1923)
- The Story of Dorset (1924)
- Winterwise (1927)
- Chrysalis (1928)
- The Beloved Community (1930)
- Green Mountains to Sierras (1936)
- Cactus Forest (1938)
- 'Allo good-by (1940)
- A Book of New England (1947)
- God and Company (1953)

=== Essays and stories ===
- "Five Women on the Trail" (1909)
- "Nothing" (1913)
- "In the Wilderness" (1915)
- "The Passing of Indoors" (1916)
- "The Glory of the States: Vermont" (1917)
- "Corners" (1920)
- "The New Crop" (1923)
- "On Writing a Town History" (1925)
- "On Re-reading the Bible" (1925)
- "The Modern Woman's Home" (1926)

== Personal life ==
In 1914, Zephine Humphrey married artist Wallace Weir Fahnestock and moved to Dorset, Vermont. She died there in 1956, aged 81 years. A box of her papers is in the collection of the University of Vermont Libraries. The Dorset Historical Society also has materials related to Zephine Humphrey Fahnestock.
