= George Griffiths =

George Griffiths may refer to:

- George Griffiths (British politician) (1880–1945)
- George Griffiths (Australian politician) (1840–1905)
- George Griffiths (cricketer) (born 1938), Australian cricketer
- George Griffiths (footballer, born 1865) (1865–1918), Welsh footballer
- George Griffiths (footballer, born 1924) (1924–2004), English footballer
- George Griffiths (historian) (1933–2014), New Zealand historian and journalist
- George Richard Griffiths (1802–1859), merchant and banker in the then Colony of New South Wales

== See also ==
- George Griffith (disambiguation)
- Georges Griffiths (1990–2017), Ivorian footballer
- Griffiths (surname)
- George Griffin (disambiguation)
