= Edward Humphrey =

Edward Humphrey may refer to:

- Edward Porter Humphrey (1809–1886), Presbyterian minister, orator and writer
- Edward William Cornelius Humphrey (1844–1917), his son, theological and legal scholar
