= Samuel Booth (politician) =

Former politician in Brooklyn, New York

Samuel Booth (July 4, 1818 – October 19, 1894) was an English-American carpenter, builder, politician, and Mayor of Brooklyn.

== Life ==
Booth was born on July 4, 1818, in England, the son of Thomas Booth and Rebecca. When he was three weeks old, he immigrated with his family to America. The family initially settled in New York City, New York for ten years, at which point they moved to Brooklyn.

After finishing school at 14 Booth became a clerk in the wholesale grocery house of Thomas McLean on Maiden Lane. When he was 16, he became an apprentice for Brooklyn carpenter and builder Elias Combs. In 1843, he began to work on his own, building houses and business blocks. In 1851, he was elected alderman and supervisor of the Fourth Ward as a Whig. As supervisor, he personally supervised the construction of the county penitentiary as well as the county courthouse. He declined a re-election in 1855, but in 1857 he was elected supervisor and was continuously re-elected until 1865, by then a member of the Republican Party. He was also appointed a member of the board of education for two years.

In 1865, Booth was elected Mayor of Brooklyn. He served in that office for two years, but was hampered by the majority of the board of aldermen. In 1869, he was appointed Postmaster of Brooklyn.

Booth never married. He was an active member of the Hanson Place Methodist Church, and served as superintendent of its Sunday School.

Booth died at home on October 19, 1894. He was buried in Green-Wood Cemetery.

Political offices
Preceded by Alfred M. Wood	Mayor of Brooklyn; 1866–1867	Succeeded by Martin Kalbfleisch
