= George Griffith (disambiguation) =

George Griffith (1857–1906) was a science fiction writer and explorer.

George Griffith may also refer to:

- George Griffith (MP), Member of Parliament (MP) for Staffordshire
- George Griffith (cricketer) (1833–1879), English cricketer
- George Griffith (bishop) (1601–1666), bishop of St. Asaph
- George Marshall Griffith (1877–1946), early aviator in the Royal Flying Corps
- George Henry Wilson Griffith (1891–1978), lord mayor of Birmingham, England, 1953–54
- George Griffith, former headmaster of The Perse School

== See also ==
- George Griffiths (disambiguation)
- Georges Griffiths (1990–2017), Ivorian footballer
- Griffith (surname)
- George Griffin (disambiguation)
