= Alfred M. Wood =

American politician (1825–1895)

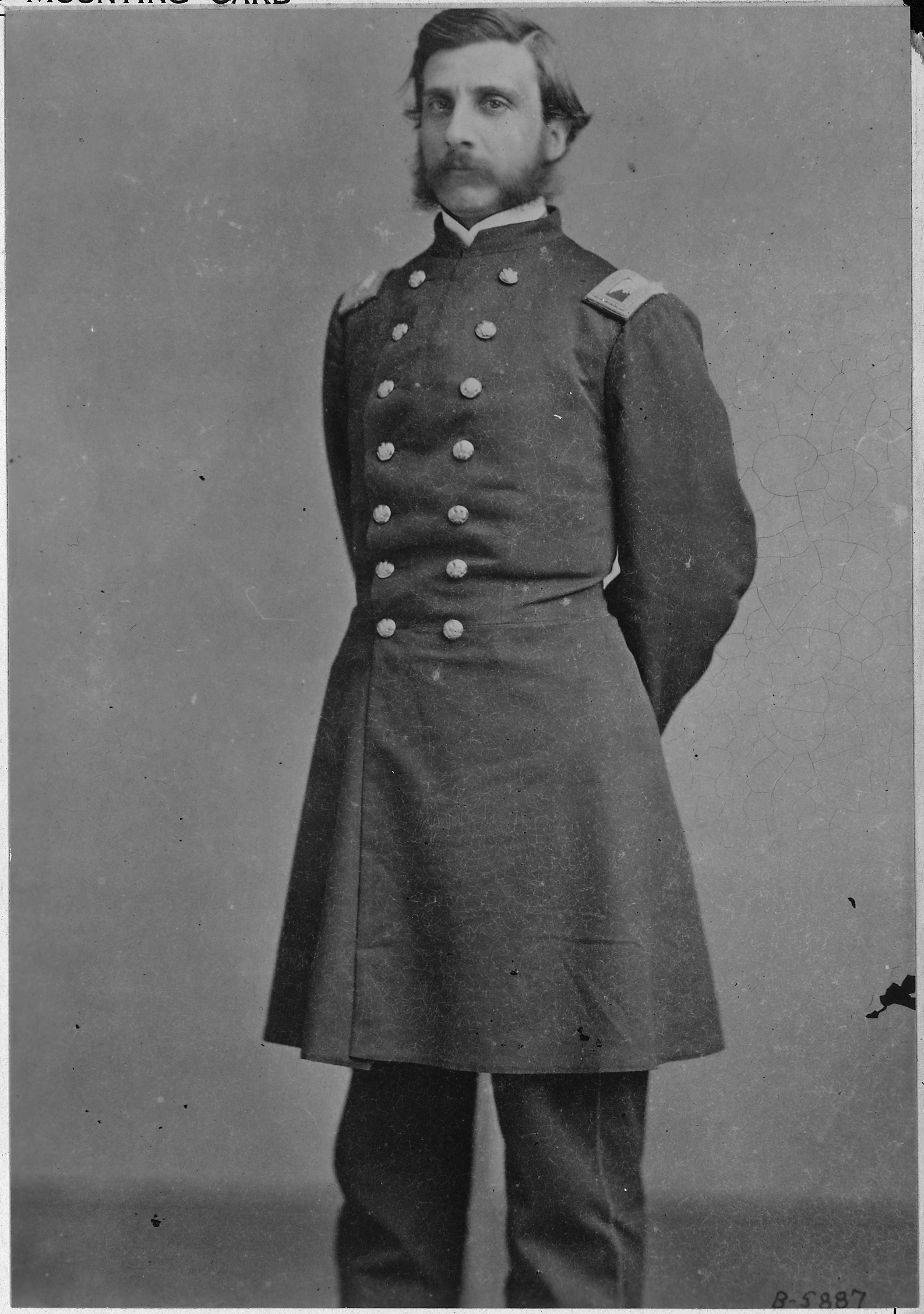
- Colonel A.M. Wood

Mayor of Brooklyn
- In office 1864–1865
- Preceded by: Martin Kalbfleisch
- Succeeded by: Samuel Booth

Personal details
- Born: April 19, 1825
- Died: July 28, 1895 (aged 70)
- Party: Republican

Military service
- Battles/wars: American Civil War: First Battle of Bull Run

Alfred M. Wood (April 19, 1825 – July 28, 1895) was an officer in the Union Army during the American Civil War.

On April 13, 1858, Wood was commissioned as colonel of the 14th New York Militia (14th Brooklyn), a local antebellum militia regiment.

When the Civil War erupted, Wood enlisted at the age of 35 on April 4, 1861, in Brooklyn, New York, to serve three years. He was wounded and captured on July 21, 1861, at the First Battle of Bull Run, exchanged for a Confederate colonel, and returned to field duty. Because of his wounds received at the battle of First Bull Run, he was discharged for disability on October 18, 1861. After the war Alfred Wood became very involved in the post war affairs of his beloved 14th Brooklyn; helping the veterans of the unit. He also became Mayor of Brooklyn, 1864–1865.
