= Edward Dorr Griffin =

American Christian minister and educator

The Reverend Edward Dorr Griffin D.D.
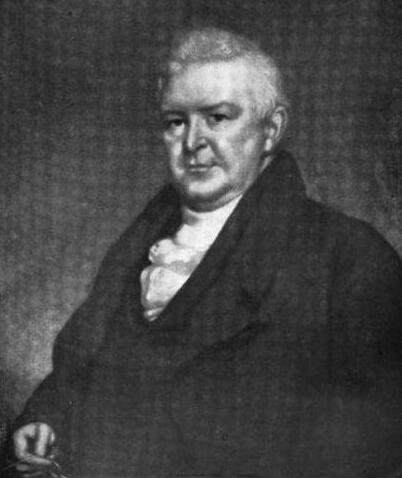

Orders
- Ordination: 1795

Personal details
- Born: January 6, 1770 East Haddam, Connecticut Colony, British America
- Died: November 8, 1837 (aged 67) Newark, New Jersey, U.S.
- Denomination: Congregationalism
- Education: Yale College (1790); Union College D.D. (1808)
- Relatives: George Griffin (brother)

3rd President of Williams College
- In office 1821–1836
- Preceded by: Zephaniah Swift Moore
- Succeeded by: Mark Hopkins

1st Pastor of Park Street Church
- In office 1811–1815
- Succeeded by: Sereno Edwards Dwight

Edward Dorr Griffin (January 6, 1770 – November 8, 1837) was a Christian minister and an American educator who served as President of Williams College from 1821 to 1836 and served as the first pastor of Park Street Church from 1811 to 1815.

== Life and career ==
Griffin was born in East Haddam, Connecticut. His brother was the theological author George Griffin.

Griffin graduated from Yale College in 1790 as the school's first Phi Beta Kappa student. He was licensed in 1792 and began his ministry in New Salem, Massachusetts the next year. In 1795 he was ordained at the Congregational Church in New Hartford, Connecticut. He earned his Doctorate of Divinity from Union College in 1808 and became professor of rhetoric at Andover Theological Seminary the next year. In 1811 he officially became the first pastor of Park Street Church in Boston where he preached a prominent series of sermons opposing New Divinity.

When Griffin came to Williams College in 1821, it had two professors; one planned to move, and the other was gravely ill. Griffin raised funds and hired brothers Mark Hopkins and Albert Hopkins.

He resigned in 1836 for health reasons and died in Newark, New Jersey the next year. Griffin Hall at Williams College is named in his honor.

== Selected publications ==
A plea for Africa. A sermon preached October 26, 1817, in the First Presbyterian Church in the City of New-York, before the Synod ... Date: 1817 Location: United States—New York—New York City. Author: Griffin, Edward Dorr, 1770–1837. Physical description: 76 p. 22 cm.

- Lectures delivered in Park Street Church, Boston, on Sabbath Evening (Boston, 1813) (accessible on Google Books Oct. 14, 2009)
- Sixty Sermons on Practical Subjects (New York, 1844).(accessible on Google Books Oct. 14, 2009)
- William Buell Sprague, Ed. (1839). Sermons by the Late Edward Dorr Griffin, to which is Prefixed a Memoir of His Life. (2 vols.) New York: M.W. Dodd.accessible online https://archive.org/details/sermonsbylaterev01grif
