= Edward William Cornelius Humphrey =

American lawyer

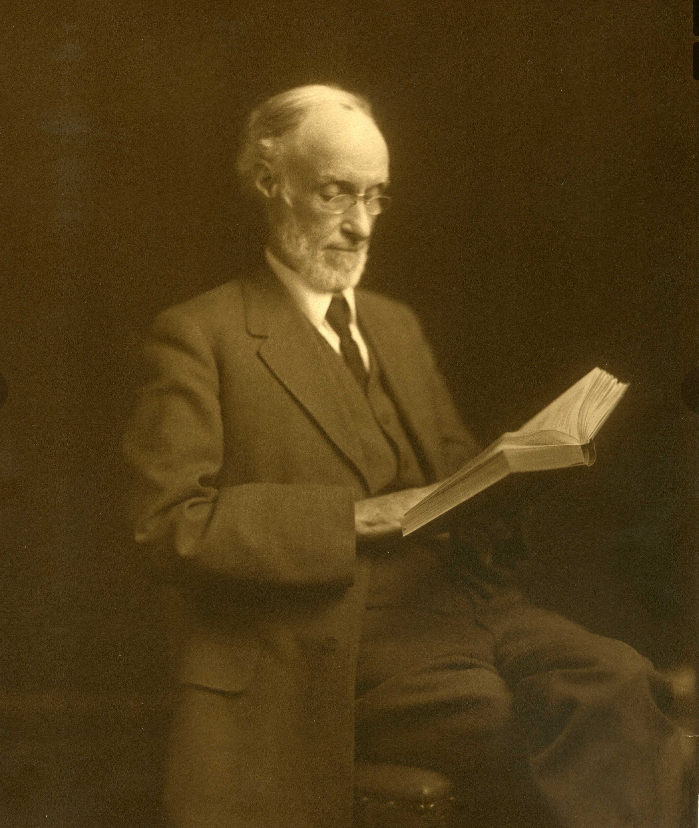
- Born: May 23, 1844; Louisville, Kentucky, U.S.
- Died: March 22, 1917 (aged 72); Jefferson County, Kentucky, U.S.
- Education: Centre College, Amherst College Honorary A.M., Harvard University
- Occupations: Lawyer; legal scholar
- Spouse: Jessamine Barkley Humphrey (died 1905)
- Children: Lewis Craig Humphrey
- Father: Edward Porter Humphrey

Edward William Cornelius Humphrey (May 23, 1844 – March 22, 1917), also known as "Alphabet Humphrey" and "Judge Humphrey", was a theological and legal scholar and influential member of the National Presbyterian General Assembly. A Harvard graduate with an honorary degree from Amherst, he was also an 1864 graduate of Centre College, of which he became a trustee in 1885. He was a trustee of the Louisville Presbyterian Theological Seminary and for forty-four successive terms was elected Director of the Louisville Law Library Company. He was a key figure in a long discussion and eventual acceptance of a Presbyterian creed revision held in May 1902 in New York City by the national Presbyterian General Assembly.

== Early life and education ==
Humphrey was born in Louisville, Kentucky, the son of Presbyterian minister Edward Porter Humphrey and Catherine Cornelia (née Prather). His mother Catherine died shortly after Edward's birth, and afterwards his father married Martha Anne Fontaine Pope. He was the grandson of Congregationalist minister Heman Humphrey, an author of theological treatises and the second president of Amherst College. Humphrey graduated in 1864 from Centre College, and received an honorary A.M. degree from Amherst College. Subsequently, he studied law at the University of Louisville and at Harvard, class of 1866.

== Law practice ==
Humphrey practiced law with the firm of Humphrey & Davie of Louisville. During his long career on the Board of Trustees of Centre College, he was in charge of the school's extensive property interests. He was also a trustee of the Louisville Presbyterian Theological Seminary and served on the committee which united the North and South Presbyterian Kentucky seminaries and colleges.

In 1874 Humphrey was appointed as director and treasurer of the Louisville Law Library Company, a position for which he was re-elected for forty-four successive terms.

== Presbyterianism ==
Humphrey's drafted creed proposal was accepted by vote of the General Assembly of which he was a voting member. He was one of six Presbyterians charged with drafting the proposal regarding creed revision. The other five members of the committee were ordained Presbyterian ministers, one of whom was the General Assembly moderator.

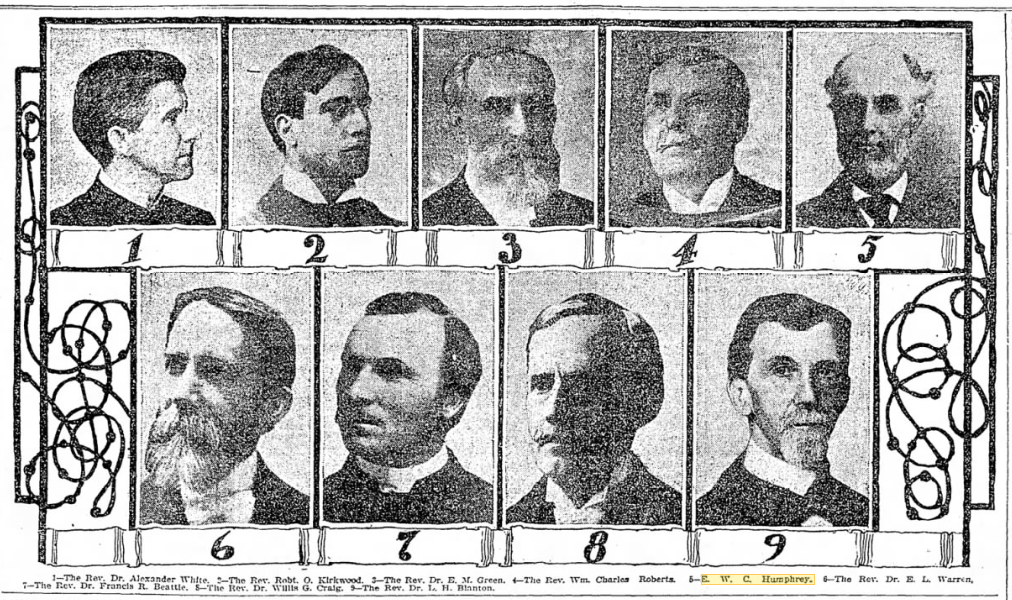
2016-05-10 1951 Louisville-Courier-Journal photo September 28, 1902 of Centenary Jubilee Presbyterian leaders

E.W.C. Humphrey was an active Presbyterian elder, legal advisor to a large body of Presbyterian associations based in Louisville, Kentucky and a voting participant on a strategic creed revision enacted at the National Presbyterian General Assembly of 1901. At an 1895 meeting of the congregation of the College Street Presbyterian Church of Louisville, elders of the church E.W.C. Humphrey and Thomas Speed, a United States representative from Kentucky were designated to notify the Presbytery of the members' vote to accept the resignation of the church minister. (In Presbyterianism church governance involves levels of decision-making, from church member, to Presbyterian elder, to Presbyterian session, to Presbyterian synod, to representatives to the Presbyterian General Assembly, where final votes on Presbyterian Church creed and Presbyterian polity are decided.)

In 1897, in accordance with Presbyterian polity a meeting of Presbyterian elders and ministers was held at Edward William Cornelius's home in Louisville, Kentucky to begin to organize and discuss the merging of the northern Presbyterian church and the southern Presbyterian church in the United States.

In 1901, an overflow crowd gathered to hear discussions on Presbyterian creed revision which was held at Princeton Theological Seminary. At this meeting Humphrey and Dr. William McKibben presented the minority report.

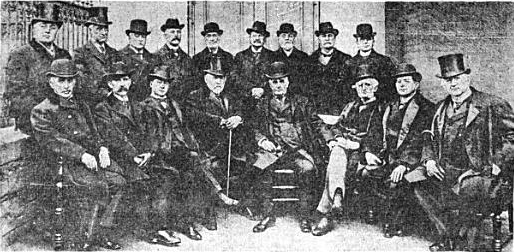
A meeting of the Presbyterian creed revision committee before submitting proposal to the national General Assembly. Photo includes President Benjamin Harrison and Judge Edward William Cornelius Humphrey.

On October 15, 1902, the Centenary Jubilee of Kentucky Presbyterians was the cause for reflection and celebration in Lexington, Kentucky of the history of the church formed in the Kentucky wilderness of 1802. Included in the event was "A Historical Sketch of the Synod" by Hon. E.W.C. Humphrey.

Humphrey, as a Presbyterian Church Elder from Louisville, was appointed by the Presbyterian General Assembly to serve on the national committee which met in Philadelphia on February 5, 1902, to consider creed revision. The group of six was charged with preparing the statement for changes to be presented to the General Assembly the following May in New York. The Fort Wayne Sentinel reported, "Final action, it is expected, will also be taken on the questions of a brief statement from Presbyterian doctrine and a declaratory statement concerning debatable points in the Confession of Faith."

On the final vote of the Presbyterian General Assembly, all of the committee's creed changes were accepted except those not recommended by Humphrey and McKibben, who led the dissenting opinion on those changes.

== Personal life ==
By his second wife, Jessamine Barkley, Humphrey was father of several children, including Lewis Craig Humphrey, editor of the Louisville Evening Post and Louisville Herald.
