= William Buell Sprague =

American historian and theologian (1795–1876)

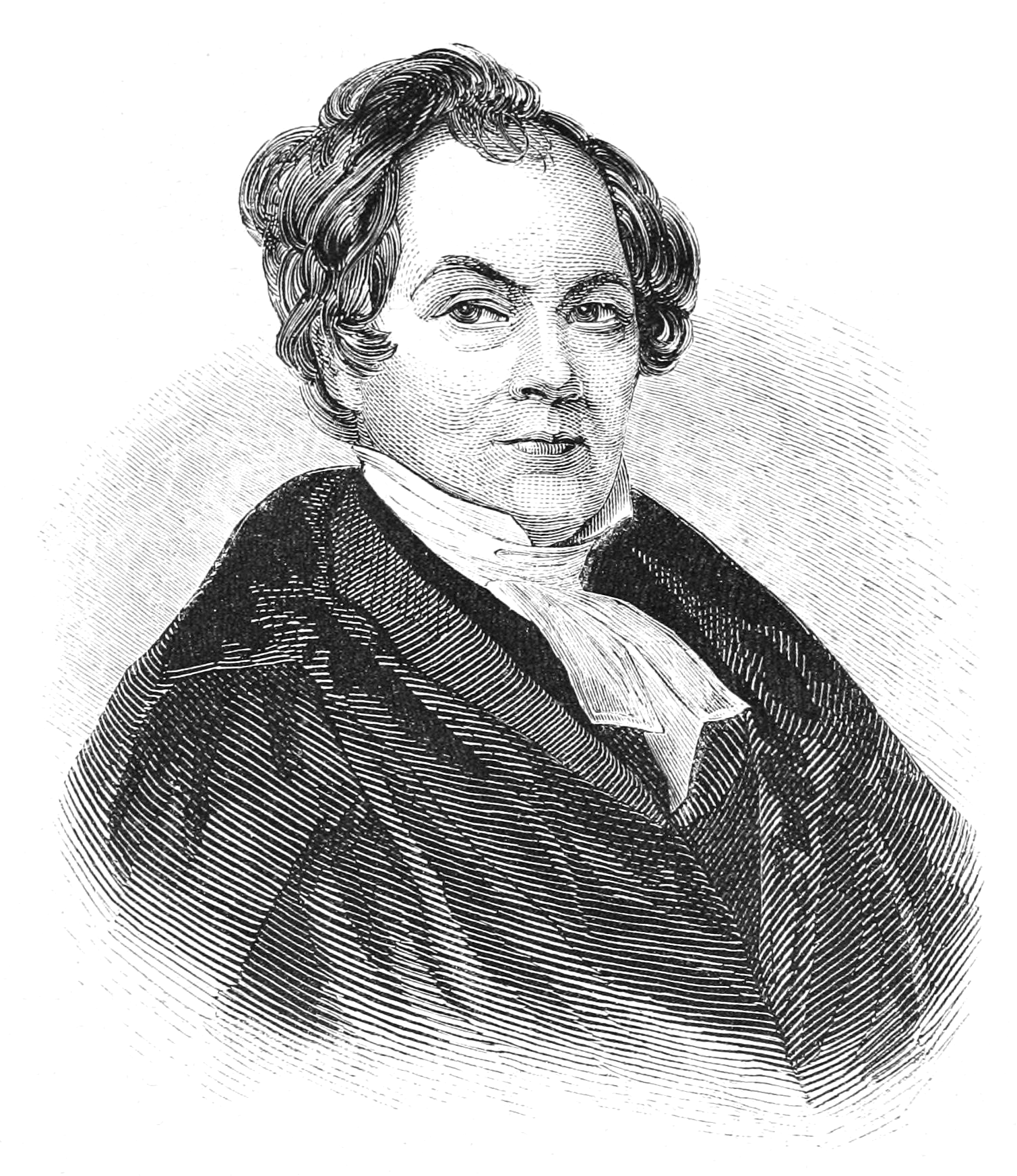
Engraved portrait of William Buell Sprague

William Buell Sprague (October 16, 1795 – May 7, 1876) was an American Congregational and Presbyterian clergyman and compiler of Annals of the American Pulpit (nine volumes, 1857–1869), a comprehensive biographical dictionary of the leading American Protestant Christian ministers who died before 1850.

== Biography ==
He was educated at Yale under Timothy Dwight IV, graduating in 1815, then studied at Princeton Theological Seminary under Dr. Archibald Alexander and Samuel Miller. He became assistant to the Rev. Joseph Lathrop at the West Springfield, Massachusetts, Congregational church in 1819. The following year, when Lathrop died after sixty years as pastor there, Sprague became senior minister and served there nine more years. Thereafter, he accepted a call to pastor the Second Presbyterian Church, Albany, New York, where Edward Norris Kirk had been an assistant, and where Sprague ministered for forty years. Sprague wrote numerous books, including Lives of the Rev. Edward Dorr Griffin, D. D, (1838), Timothy Dwight (1845), and the Rev.Jedidiah Morse (1874), his greatest contribution to literature being his Annals of the American Pulpit, an invaluable compilation of Trinitarian Congregationalist, Presbyterian, Baptist, Methodist, Episcopalian, Unitarian Congregationalist, and other biographies. Although no edition of his collected works ever was published, Sprague's published individual sermons, discourses, and addresses in pamphlet form exceed 150 in number.

Sprague was also a collector of historical documents and pamphlets and became the first person to gather a complete set of the autographs of the signers of the United States Declaration of Independence. He completed this task by February, 1833, according to correspondence with friend Jared Sparks at about that time. He also gathered a collection of the signatures of all of the members of the Convention which framed the Constitution of the United States in 1787, and a complete set of the autographs of the presidents of the United States and all the officers of the United States government during the administrations of Presidents Washington, John Adams, Jefferson, Madison, Monroe and John Quincy Adams. This latter collection included signatures of the presidents, vice presidents, all the members of the Cabinet, and all of the justices of the United States Supreme Court and all of the foreign ministers. Further, he collected the signatures of all the military officers involved in the American Revolutionary War, from all nations, during the whole war. He collected signatures of great men of the Reformation and great skeptics. He even owned a copy of the autograph of Saint Augustine. He was America's foremost philographer by the time of his death. His autographs, numbering nearly 100,000, probably the largest private collection in the world at that time, were left to his son.

He was elected a member of the American Antiquarian Society in 1846.

He was married three times and had children. After his retirement from the Albany pulpit in 1870, he and his wife lived with his son Edward Everett Sprague, a lawyer, in Flushing, New York. He died there in 1876 and was buried in Albany Rural Cemetery in Menands, New York.

== Works ==
He authored;

- "Letters on Practical Subjects from a Clergyman of New England to His Daughter" (Hartford, 1822)
- "Letters from Europe First Published in the New York Observer" (New York, 1828)
- "Lectures to Young People" (New York, 1830)
- "Lectures on the Revival of Religion" (Albany, 1832)
- "Hints Designed to Regulate the Intercourse of Christians" (Albany, 1834)
- "Lectures Illustrating the Contrast Between True Christianity and Various Other Systems" (New York, 1837)
- "Memoir of the late Rev. Edward Dorr Griffin, D.D." (Albany, 1838)
- "Letters to Young Men" (Albany, 1844)
- "Life of Timothy Dwight" (Albany, 1845)
- "Aids to Early Religion" (New York, 1847)
- "Words to a Young Man's Conscience by a Father" (Albany, 1848)
- "Monitory Letters to Church Members" published anonymously (Philadelphia, 1855)
- "Visits to European Celebrities" (Boston, 1855)
- "Annals of the American Pulpit" (New York, 1857–1869) (9 vols.)
- "Memoirs of the Rev. John McDowell, D.D., and the Rev. William A. McDowell" (New York, 1864)
- "The Life of Jedidiah Morse" (New York, 1874)
