= Alexander Pope Humphrey =

American lawyer and judge (1848–1928)

- Born: January 26, 1848; Louisville, Kentucky, U.S.
- Died: August 17, 1928 (aged 80); Glenview, Kentucky, U.S.
- Occupations: Lawyer; judge

Alexander Pope Humphrey (1848 – 1928), was an American lawyer and judge. He attended Centre College in Danville, Kentucky and the University of Virginia law school.

== Career ==
Humphrey was a chancellor of the Louisville, Kentucky chancery court (a court of equity), having been appointed at age 32 to fill the unexpired term of Judge Horatio Washington Bruce, who had resigned on March 10, 1880, to accept a position as attorney for the Louisville and Nashville Railroad. A journal, The Virginia Law Review, published Humphrey's record in the Virginia Law Register on the impeachment of Samuel Chase.

Humphrey was a member of the law firm Humphrey, Crawford, and Middleton, and was counsel to the Southern Railway Company and other corporations. He was also a member of the law firm Barr, Goodloe & Humphrey. After retiring from the bench, he was a member of the law firm Brown, Humphrey & Davie. Following the death of his law partner Colonel John Mason Brown, he continued to practice with George M. Davie. He was the half-brother of Judge Edward William Cornelius Humphrey (1844–1917), whose son Edward Porter Humphrey (1873–1955) he invited as the third partner to the newly named firm of Humphrey, Davie, and Humphrey.

Humphrey delivered the annual address before the Virginia State Bar Association at Hot Springs, Virginia on August 3, 1899. This was an address which was later printed in the Virginia Law Register and Virginia Law Review.

== Family ==
Humphrey was the only son of Kentuckians Rev. Dr. Edward Porter Humphrey and his second wife, Martha Ann Fontaine Pope Humphrey.

The wedding of Alexander and Mrs. Humphrey's daughter Ethel to Mr. Edward Mellon of Paris, France, grandson of Thomas Mellon, patriarch of the Mellon family of Pittsburgh, was held at her parents' spacious home, "Fincastle", in Glenview, Kentucky. The wedding is described in detail in the Leavenworth Times, a Kansas newspaper.

== Filson Club ==
Humphrey was one of the organizers of the Filson Club, Louisville's privately operated history society, historical museum, and archive, in the Ferguson Mansion in Old Louisville, now known as the Filson Historical Society.
