= William H. DeBevoise =

Union Army officer (1828–1862)

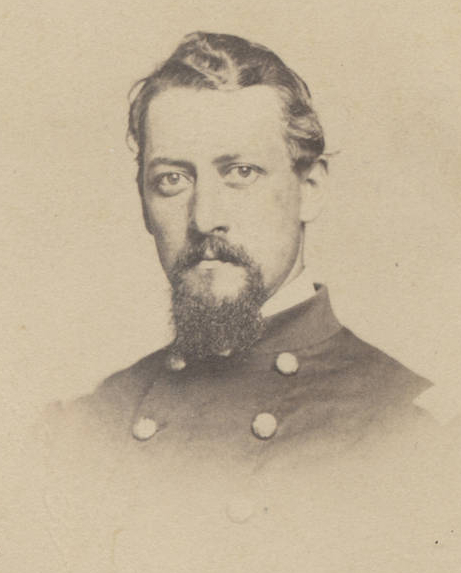
- Born: May 10, 1828; Brooklyn, New York, U.S.
- Died: September 17, 1862 (aged 34) Sharpsburg, Maryland, U.S.
- Buried: Green-Wood Cemetery, Brooklyn, New York
- Allegiance: United States (Union)
- Branch: U.S. Army (Union Army)
- Service years: 1861–1862
- Rank: Lieutenant Colonel
- Commands: 14th Regiment New York State Militia
- Conflicts: First Battle of Bull Run; Battle of South Mountain; Battle of Antietam †

William H. DeBevoise (May 10, 1828 – September 17, 1862) was a Union Army officer in the American Civil War, best known for leading the celebrated 14th Regiment New York State Militia (also known as the 84th New York Volunteer Infantry Regiment or the 14th Brooklyn) and falling at the Battle of Antietam.

== Early life and career ==
William Henry DeBevoise was born May 10, 1828, in Brooklyn, New York, to Samuel DeBevoise and Elizabeth (Hart) DeBevoise. Raised in a prominent Dutch-American family with deep roots in Kings County, New York, he came of age in a Brooklyn transforming into a major urban center. Active in civic life, he graduated from New York University in 1848, where he was noted for his public speaking and interest in politics. After graduation, he worked as a commission merchant, a position that connected him to the city's growing commercial elite.

By 1860, DeBevoise was a lieutenant in the 13th New York State Militia and a member of the Brooklyn Chamber of Commerce. He was active in local Democratic politics and known as a vigorous supporter of Unionism even before secession. His militia experience and public reputation made him a natural leader in the spring of 1861, when Brooklyn moved quickly to contribute troops to the war effort. He played a leading role in mustering and organizing the 14th Brooklyn, a regiment famed for its Zouave drill, red-trimmed blue jackets, and distinctive gaiters, modeled after elite French light infantry.

== Civil War service ==
=== First Bull Run ===
DeBevoise was commissioned captain of Company H on May 18, 1861. The 14th Brooklyn was among the first regiments to leave New York for Washington and became part of the First Brigade, First Division, Army of Northeastern Virginia. At the First Battle of Bull Run (July 21), the regiment held the left flank during the Union advance and later covered the retreat under severe fire. DeBevoise's company fought fiercely to hold ground near the Henry House and suffered heavy losses—nearly 40% of its strength—in the brutal withdrawal through the woods and fields of northern Virginia.

=== Peninsula Campaign ===
Promoted to major in February 1862, DeBevoise continued to serve with distinction as the 14th joined the Army of the Potomac under General George B. McClellan. During the Peninsula Campaign, he led the regiment through grueling marches and engagements, including the Siege of Yorktown and the Battle of Gaines' Mill, where the regiment was heavily engaged in forested terrain and suffered additional losses.

=== Maryland Campaign ===
After the Union setback at Second Bull Run, DeBevoise was promoted to lieutenant colonel on August 30, 1862, assuming effective command of the depleted 14th Brooklyn. In the opening days of the Maryland Campaign, he led the regiment up the rugged slopes of South Mountain. On September 14 at Turner's Gap, the 14th Brooklyn assaulted Confederate positions held by seasoned Southern troops. The regiment fought with determination, clearing woods and stone walls in bitter close-quarters combat, but was reduced to fewer than 150 effective soldiers by day's end.

==== Battle of Antietam and death ====
At Antietam on September 17, 1862, DeBevoise led the 14th Brooklyn into the deadly fighting around the Cornfield, one of the bloodiest sites of the entire war. The regiment advanced through tall corn stalks under intense musket and artillery fire. DeBevoise, mounted and rallying his men with sword drawn, was struck by a bullet in the chest and died almost instantly. His death occurred early in the engagement, but his leadership in the advance was widely praised. The regiment remained in action for hours, and DeBevoise was one of 27 New York officers killed that day.

He never married. Letters to his sister, preserved at the Brooklyn Historical Society, reveal his commitment to duty and compassion for wounded men. One letter, written shortly before Antietam, expressed foreboding about the coming battle but affirmed his belief in the righteousness of the struggle.

== Legacy ==
DeBevoise's funeral in Brooklyn on September 28 drew thousands, including Governor Edwin D. Morgan. The procession passed through the streets of Brooklyn, with flags at half-staff and businesses closed in his honor. He was buried with full military honors at Green‑Wood Cemetery, where his grave monument bears a bronze bas‑relief portrait modeled from a wartime photograph. In later years, veterans of the 14th Brooklyn held annual reunions and commemorations at his grave. The 14th Brooklyn's battle flag, pierced by seventeen bullets at Antietam, is exhibited at the New York State Military Museum and Veterans Research Center as a testament to their sacrifice.
