= Edward Porter Humphrey =

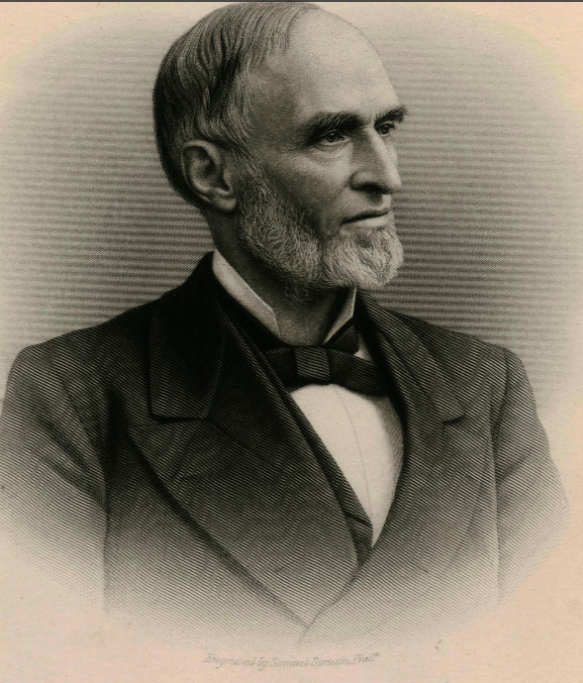
- Born: January 28, 1809; Fairfield, Connecticut
- Died: December 9, 1886
- Burial place: Cave Hill Cemetery
- Education: Amherst
- Occupations: Presbyterian minister, orator, writer, and Moderator of the Presbyterian General Assembly
- Spouses: Catherine Cornelia Prather; Martha Pope
- Children: Edward William Cornelius Humphrey; Alexander Pope Humphrey
- Parent(s): Heman Humphrey; Sophia Porter

Edward Porter Humphrey (1809–1886) was an American Presbyterian minister, orator, writer, and moderator of the national Presbyterian General Assembly. He was a planner and co-founder of Cave Hill Cemetery in Louisville, Kentucky.

== Biography ==
Humphrey was the son of Heman Humphrey, a Congregationalist minister and the second president of Amherst College, and his wife Sophia Porter (1785–1868), daughter of Noah Porter. He was born in Fairfield, Connecticut. In 1841, he married his first wife, Catherine Cornelia Prather, daughter of Thomas Prather. Their only son, Edward William Cornelius Humphrey, became a legal expert and representative to the national Presbyterian General Assembly. A daughter died as an infant shortly after Catherine died during childbirth on September 28, 1844.

On April 3, 1847, Humphrey married his second wife, Martha Pope, daughter of Alexander Pope and Martha Fontaine and widow of her cousin, Charles Pope, son of William Pope Jr., and Cynthia Sturgess. Humphrey's second son, Alexander Pope Humphrey, was a lawyer with the firm of Brown, Humphrey, & Davie in Louisville.

== Religious training and ministry ==
Humphrey grew up in Connecticut, and he trained for college at the Amherst academy. In 1828 he graduated with honors from Amherst College. In 1833 he graduated at the Andover Theological Seminary, and in 1834 he answered the call to begin his ministry as pastor of a Presbyterian church in Jeffersonville, Indiana. He soon, in 1835, became pastor of the Second Presbyterian Church in Old Louisville, Kentucky, and served that rapidly expanding church for eighteen years. In 1846 the Rev. Stuart Robinson, for whom the Stuart Robinson School was later named, filled the pulpit during a nine-month absence of Rev. Dr. Edward P. Humphrey. In 1852, Humphrey was elected Moderator of the General Assembly of the Old School Presbyterian Church, and he preached a sermon called "Our Theology" as retiring moderator to the national assembly gathered in Charleston, South Carolina. The sermon was well received and was distributed by the Presbyterian Board of Publications. He served as pastor in Louisville of the old Presbyterian Church on Third Street between Green and Walnut Streets, a building later converted into a theatre and eventually known as the Metropolitan building.

He received the degree of Doctor of Divinity from Hanover College in Indiana in 1852, and in 1853 he was named by the General Assembly of the Presbyterian Church as a professor in Princeton Theological Seminary. He declined the professorship at the Princeton Seminary but accepted one offered as Professor of Church History at the Theological College in Danville, Kentucky. In the later years of his residence in Danville, his health began to fail, perhaps because of the ongoing American Civil War. He had a devoted loyalty to the Union forces of the national government and a strong desire for conciliation of the differing factions in the nation and in the church.

In 1848, he gave the dedicatory address for Cave Hill Cemetery, saying, "Let the place of graves be rural and beautiful. Let trees be planted there. Let the opening year invite to their branches the springing leaf and birds of song . . . . Let the tokens of fond remembrance in the shrub and flower be there."

== Member, National Presbyterian General Assembly ==
In 1866 he answered an appeal to return to Louisville. Members of the old Second Church, where he had been pastor for many years, started a newly organized College Street Presbyterian Church, of which he became the pastor. The church became one of Louisville's largest and most notable places of worship. In 1871, Amherst College, his alma mater conferred upon him the degree of L.L.D.
