= George Griffin =

George Griffin may refer to:

- George C. Griffin (1897–1990), served in various positions at the Georgia Institute of Technology, including Dean of Men
- George Griffin (butler) (1849–1897), American freed slave and butler for Mark Twain
- George Griffin (rugby league) (born 1992), rugby league footballer
- George Griffin (animator) (born 1943), American animator
- George Griffin (author) (1778–1860), American lawyer and author
- George Eugene Griffin, English pianist and composer
- G. Edward Griffin (George Edward Griffin), American author, filmmaker, and conspiracy theorist

== See also ==
- George Griffith (disambiguation)
