= Lewis Craig Humphrey =

American newspaper editor (1875–1927)

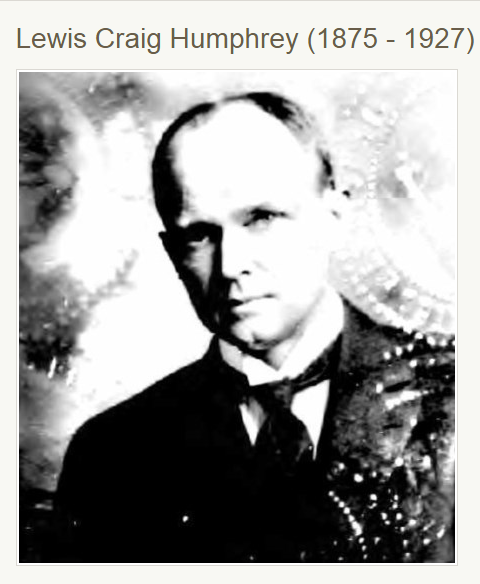
- Born: September 28, 1875; Louisville, Kentucky, U.S.
- Died: February 3, 1927 (aged 51); Jefferson County, Kentucky, U.S.
- Resting place: Cave Hill Cemetery; Louisville, Kentucky, U.S.
- Education: Centre College
- Occupations: Editor, Evening Post, Editor, Louisville Herald, Associate editor, Louisville Herald-Post
- Spouse: Eleanor Silliman Belknap
- Father: Edward William Cornelius Humphrey

Lewis Craig Humphrey (1875–1927) was an American Kentucky newspaper editor who began his journalistic career as a reporter at the Louisville daily newspaper, the Louisville Evening Post, under the supervision of editor and publisher Richard W. Knott. Upon Knott's death, Humphrey became chief editor of the paper.

== Early life and education ==
Humphrey was the son of Judge Edward William Cornelius Humphrey (1844–1917) and Jessamine Barkley (1846–1905). He attended public school in Louisville and graduated from Centre College in Danville, Kentucky, in 1896.

== Political activity ==
Humphrey was active in politics with the Democratic Party of Kentucky. The Kentucky Irish American, a newspaper in Louisville, reported that Humphrey was a member of the organizational committee which wanted to "mark the end of Republican machine rule in Kentucky." According to the Kingsport Times (Tennessee), shortly after he became a reporter he was made news writer, city editor, and associate editor of the Evening Post until it merged with the Herald, at which time he became associate editor of the Louisville Herald-Post. The merger was planned by publisher/financier James Buckner Brown to balance the influence of the Barry Bingham Sr. family newspapers, including the Louisville Courier Journal, but the Herald-Post lost its financial support when another of Brown's enterprises failed.

== Newspaper career ==
Humphrey was editor of The Cento, the Centre College newspaper. After his tenure at the Louisville Evening Post with editor and publisher Knott, Humphrey worked his way up through the ranks to become chief editor at the Louisville Herald. After the Herald's merger with the Louisville Post, he became associate editor of the Louisville Herald-Post, a broadsheet daily newspaper founded by its original owner, financier James Buckner Brown, in 1925. After additional takeovers and bankruptcies, the Louisville Herald-Post ceased publication in 1936. The newspaper's photo morgue was then donated to the Louisville Free Public Library before being accessioned by the University of Louisville Photographic Archives in 1994.

== Personal life ==
Humphrey married Eleanor Silliman Belknap (1876–1964), the eldest daughter of William Richardson Belknap, on December 19, 1904, at Lincliff, the home of the bride's parents.

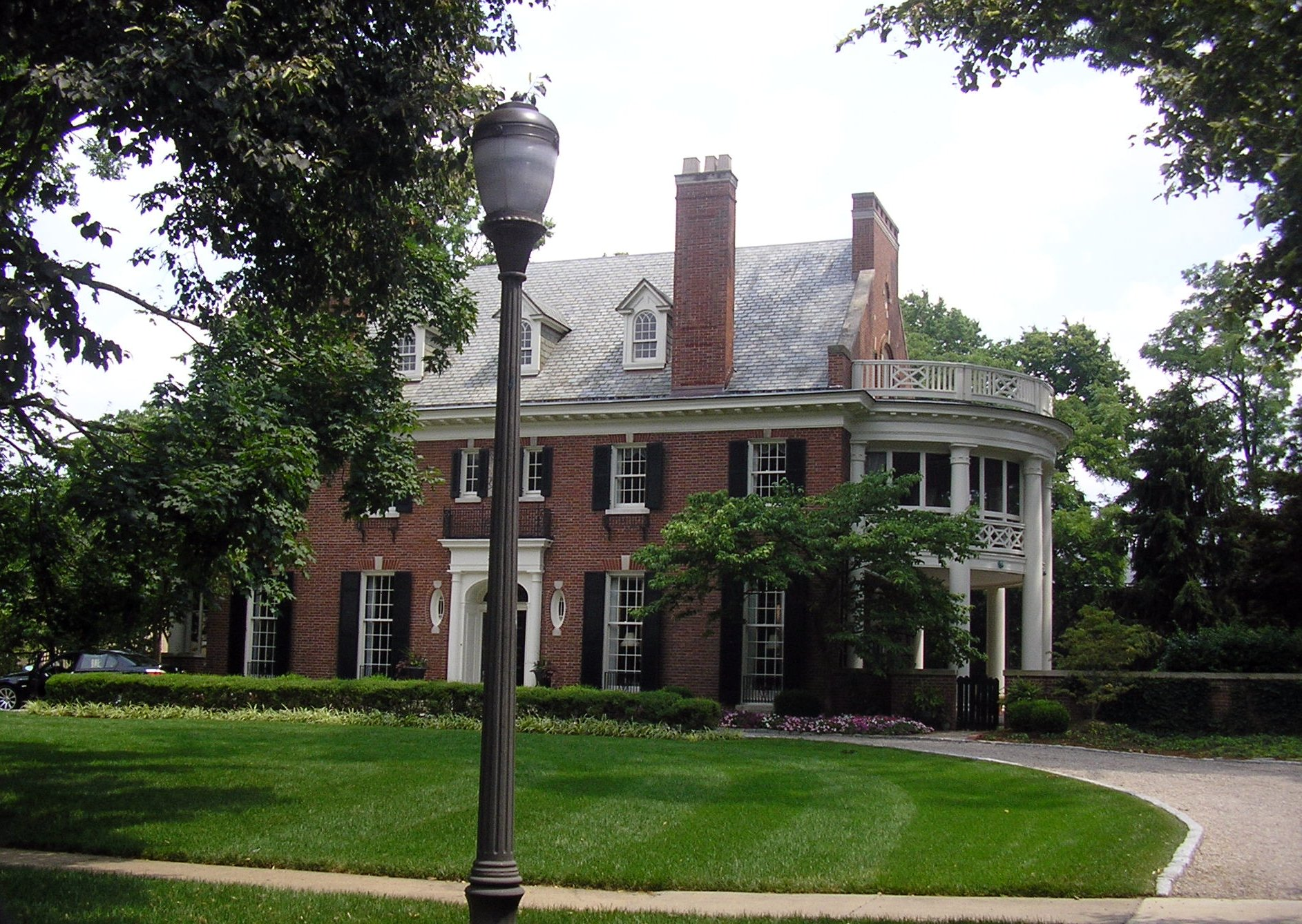
Humphrey-McMeekin House

In 1914, he and his wife commissioned the design by Gray and Wischmeyer of their home in The Highlands. The house, built by the Alfred Struck Company is known as the Humphrey-McMeekin House and was placed on the National Register of Historic Places in 1983. The couple had two daughters and two sons.

Humphrey contracted cancer and died on February 3, 1927. He was buried at Louisville's Cave Hill Cemetery.
