= Harry C. Payne =

Harry C. "Hank" Payne (March 25, 1947 – January 7, 2008) was the 17th president of Hamilton College (1988-1993), the 14th president of Williams College (1994-1999), and later president of Woodward Academy. Born in Worcester, Massachusetts, he earned academic degrees in history from Yale University, and taught at Colgate University before becoming provost of Haverford College and then president at Hamilton and Williams. He is known for disputing the story that Zephaniah Swift Moore, in his attempt to move Williams College closer to Boston, pilfered its library.
