= Humphrey-McMeekin House =

Historic house in Kentucky, United States

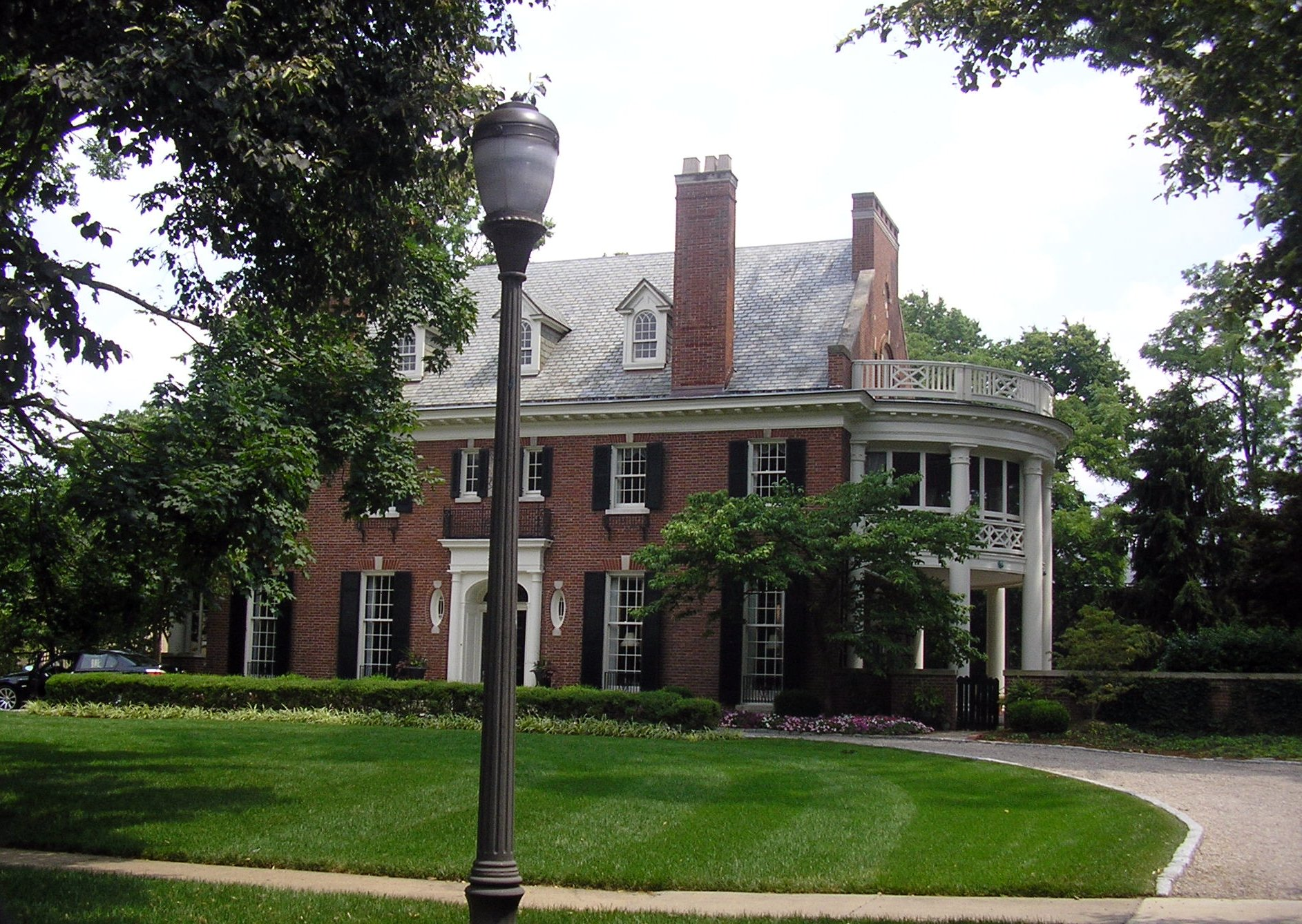
Humphrey-McMeekin House

Humphrey-McMeekin House is considered one of the finest Colonial Revival houses in Louisville, Kentucky. It was designed and built in 1914–1915 as their private residence by newspaper editor Lewis Craig Humphrey (1875–1927) and his wife Eleanor Silliman Belknap Humphrey (1876–1964), both Louisville natives. The mansion was placed on the National Register of Historic Places in 1983.

The Humphrey-McMeekin House, located at 2240 Douglass Boulevard in the historic Highlands section of Louisville, was co-designed by architects George Gray and Herman Wishmeyer and built by Alfred Struck & Company in accordance with the design and lifestyle criteria of its owners, Lewis Craig Humphrey and Eleanor Silliman Belknap Humphrey. According to the application to the National Register of Historic Places the house was entered under Criterion C of the application as one of Louisville's finest examples of the colonial revival style.

The 1986 application to the National Register further states, "The next prominent owners of the property were Sam H. and Isabel McMeekin. They purchased this property in 1973." Sam McMeekin, a former sports editor for Louisville's Courier-Journal (1911–1923), became "placing judge" and racing steward at Churchill Downs and later became city safety director, a civilian post.

Owners and residents of the house at the time of the 1986 application for listing on the National Register of Historic Places were Mr. and Mrs. Don Ingwerson.

== See also ==
- National Register of Historic Places listings in The Highlands, Louisville, Kentucky
