= George Taylor (New York politician) =

American politician

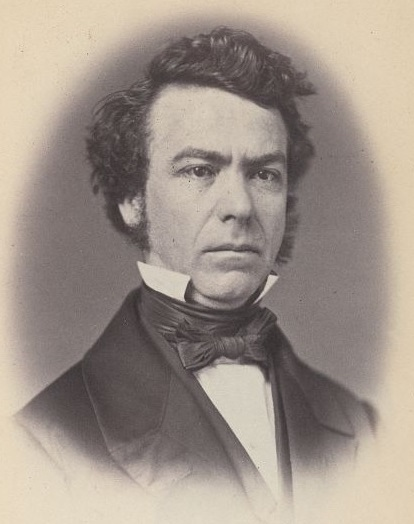

Member of the U.S. House of Representatives from New York's 2nd district
- In office March 4, 1857 – March 3, 1859
- Preceded by: James S. T. Stranahan
- Succeeded by: James Humphrey

Personal details
- Born: October 19, 1820 Wheeling, Virginia, U.S.
- Died: January 18, 1894 (aged 73) Washington, D.C., U.S.
- Resting place: Rock Creek Cemetery, Washington, D.C., U.S.
- Party: Democratic
- Profession: Politician, attorney

George Taylor (October 19, 1820 – January 18, 1894) was an American attorney and Democratic politician. He served as a U.S. representative from New York for one term from 1857 to 1859.

== Biography ==
Born in Wheeling, Virginia (now West Virginia), Taylor studied medicine and law. He was admitted to the bar and began the practice of law in Indiana.

He moved to Alabama in 1844, and to Brooklyn, New York, in 1848, where he continued his practice and held several local offices.

=== Congress ===
Taylor was elected as a Democrat to the Thirty-fifth Congress (March 4, 1857 – March 3, 1859). In 1858, he was an unsuccessful candidate for reelection to the Thirty-sixth Congress.

=== Later career and death ===
He then resumed his practice of law in Washington, D.C., until his death.

George Taylor died at age 73 in Washington. He is interred in Rock Creek Cemetery.

U.S. House of Representatives
Preceded by James S. T. Stranahan	Member of the U.S. House of Representatives from New York's 2nd congressional district 1857–1859	Succeeded by James Humphrey
