= Zephaniah Swift Moore =

American academic administrator (1770–1823)

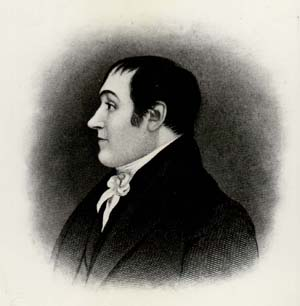

President of Williams College
- In office 1815–1821
- Preceded by: Ebenezer Fitch
- Succeeded by: Edward Dorr Griffin

President of Amherst College
- In office 1821–1823
- Succeeded by: Heman Humphrey

Personal details
- Born: November 20, 1770 Palmer, Massachusetts
- Died: June 29, 1823 (aged 52) Amherst, Massachusetts, U.S.

Zephaniah Swift Moore (November 20, 1770 – June 29, 1823) was an American Congregational clergyman and educator. He taught at Dartmouth College during the early 1810s and had a house built in Hanover, New Hampshire, that now serves as Dartmouth's Blunt Alumni Center. He served as the President of Williams College between 1815 & 1821 and the first President of Amherst College between 1821 & 1823. He is most famous for leaving Williams in order to found Amherst, taking some of the faculty and 15 students with him. The rumor that Williams College library books were also taken to Amherst College was declared false in 1995 by Williams College President Harry C. Payne.

Moore died two years after Amherst was founded, and was succeeded by Heman Humphrey, a trustee of Williams College. Moore's departure from Williams College established the foundation for the intense Williams–Amherst rivalry that persists to the present. To this day, he is regarded with a measure of derision on the Williams campus.

Cyrus Pitt Grosvenor wrote to him in 1823.

Academic offices
Preceded by Ebenezer Fitch	President of Williams College; 1815–1821	Succeeded by Edward Dorr Griffin
Preceded by None	President of Amherst College; 1821–1823	Succeeded by Heman Humphrey
