= James Humphrey (New York politician) =

American politician (1811–1866)

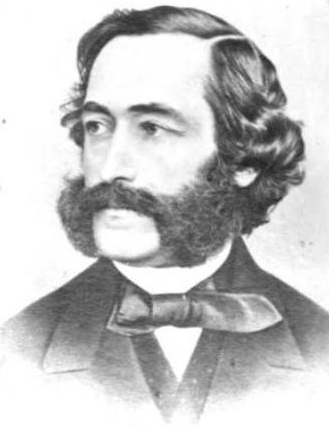

Member of the U.S. House of Representatives from New York
- In office March 4, 1859 – March 4, 1861
- Preceded by: George Taylor
- Succeeded by: Moses F. Odell
- In office March 4, 1865 – June 16, 1866
- Preceded by: Moses F. Odell
- Succeeded by: John W. Hunter
- Constituency: 2nd district (1859–1861); 3rd district (1865–1866)

Personal details
- Born: October 9, 1811 Fairfield, Connecticut
- Died: June 16, 1866 (aged 54) Brooklyn, New York
- Party: Republican
- Relations: Heman Humphrey (father)
- Education: Amherst College

James Humphrey (October 9, 1811 – June 16, 1866) was a U.S. representative from New York.

Born in Fairfield, Connecticut, Humphrey pursued classical studies under his father Heman Humphrey. He graduated from Amherst College in 1831. He studied law. He was admitted to the bar and practiced. He moved to Louisville, Kentucky, in 1837 and one year later to Brooklyn, New York.

Humphrey was elected as a Republican to the Thirty-sixth Congress (March 4, 1859 – March 3, 1861). He was an unsuccessful candidate for reelection in 1860 to the Thirty-seventh Congress and for election in 1862 to the Thirty-eighth Congress.

Humphrey was elected to the Thirty-ninth Congress and served from March 4, 1865, until his death in Brooklyn, New York, June 16, 1866. He served as chairman of the Committee on Expenditures in the Department of the Navy (Thirty-ninth Congress). He was interred in Greenwood Cemetery.

== See also ==
- List of members of the United States Congress who died in office (1790–1899)

U.S. House of Representatives
Preceded by George Taylor	Member of the U.S. House of Representatives from New York's 2nd congressional district 1859–1861	Succeeded by Moses F. Odell
Preceded by Moses F. Odell	Member of the U.S. House of Representatives from New York's 3rd congressional district 1865–1866	Succeeded by John W. Hunter
