= George Griffin (author) =

American lawyer and writer (1778–1860)

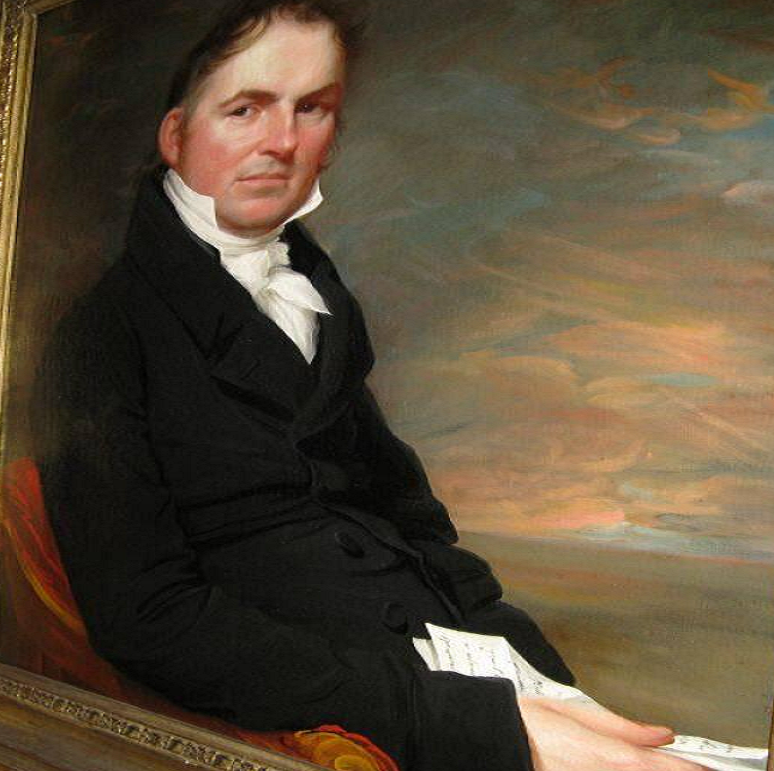
- Portrait of Griffin by Samuel Lovett Waldo
- Born: January 14, 1778; East Haddam, Connecticut, U.S.
- Died: May 6, 1860 (aged 82); New York City, New York, U.S.
- Resting place: New York City, New York, U.S.
- Education: Yale University; Litchfield Law School
- Occupations: Lawyer; writer
- Spouse: Lydia Butler
- Children: 2
- Relatives: Edward Dorr Griffin (brother); Zebulon Butler (father-in-law)

George Griffin (January 14, 1778 – May 6, 1860) was an American lawyer and writer.

== Early life ==
George Griffin was born on January 14, 1778, in East Haddam, Connecticut, to George Griffin. His younger brother was reverend Edward Dorr Griffin. He graduated from Yale University in 1797. He then studied law with Noah B. Benedict of Woodbury, Connecticut. He graduated from Litchfield Law School. He also studied law with Judge Butler of Wyoming, Pennsylvania. He was admitted to the bar in December 1799.

== Career ==
In the summer of 1800, Griffin moved to Wilkes Barre, Pennsylvania, and practiced law there for six years. In the fall of 1806, he moved to New York City and practiced law there. Around 1850, he stopped practicing law.

Griffin studied theological studies and general literature in his last ten years. He published The Sufferings of our Saviour and the Evidences of Christianity.

== Personal life ==
Griffin married Lydia Butler, the daughter of Zebulon Butler. He had two sons, Edmund and Francis.

Griffin died on May 6, 1860, at his home on West 20th Street in New York City. He was buried in a cemetery on 2nd Avenue in New York City.
