= George Marshall Griffith =

- Born: 1877; Waterbeach, Cambridgeshire, England
- Died: 1946 (aged 68–69); Brighton, England
- Military career
- Allegiance: United Kingdom
- Branch: British Army; Royal Air Force
- Rank: Lieutenant-Colonel; Wing Commander
- Commands: Commandant of the Royal Flying Corps in India
- Conflicts: World War I

Lieutenant-Colonel and Wing Commander George Marshall Griffith (1877–1946) was an early aviator in the Royal Flying Corps. He began his military career in the Royal Artillery but, having obtained his Aviator's Certificate in 1913, became a senior officer in the Royal Flying Corps and Director of Aviation in 1917 during World War I. He was later appointed Commandant of the Royal Flying Corps in India.

== Life ==
George Marshall Griffith was born in 1877 and educated at Bedford Modern School where he was in the first XI in 1894 and 1895.

Griffith became a Second Lieutenant in the Royal Garrison Artillery in 1900, and was a Captain in 1913. He joined the Royal Flying Corps almost at its inception where he was awarded his Aviator's Certificate on 3 June 1913. Griffith was made Deputy Assistant Director of the Royal Flying Corps in 1916, Director of Aviation in 1917, and relinquished his role as Wing Commander to return to the Army in 1920. Griffith was subsequently made Commandant of the Royal Flying Corps in India.

George Marshall Griffith died in Brighton, England, in 1946.
