= George Griffiths (footballer, born 1865) =

Welsh footballer

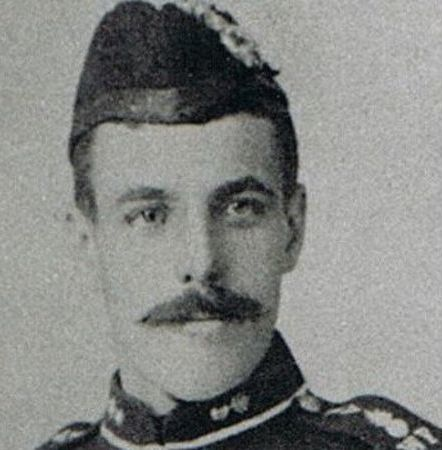

Personal information
- Date of birth: 11 April 1865
- Place of birth: Chirk, Wales
- Date of death: 7 July 1918 (aged 53)
- Place of death: Leigh, England
- Position: Inside left

Senior career*
Years	Team	Apps	(Gls)
- Chirk

International career
1887	Wales	1	(0)
- * Club domestic league appearances and goals

George Griffiths (11 April 1865 – 7 July 1918) was a Welsh amateur footballer who played for Chirk as an inside left. He was capped by Wales at international level.

== Personal life ==
Griffiths worked as a miner and had eight children. He also served in the Royal Welch Fusiliers. Griffiths served in the Army Service Corps during the First World War and was discharged in 1917 after an injury to his knee. He died of stomach cancer in July 1918.
