= Henry House Hill =

- Henry House Hill, Manassas National Battlefield
- U.S. Historic district – Contributing property
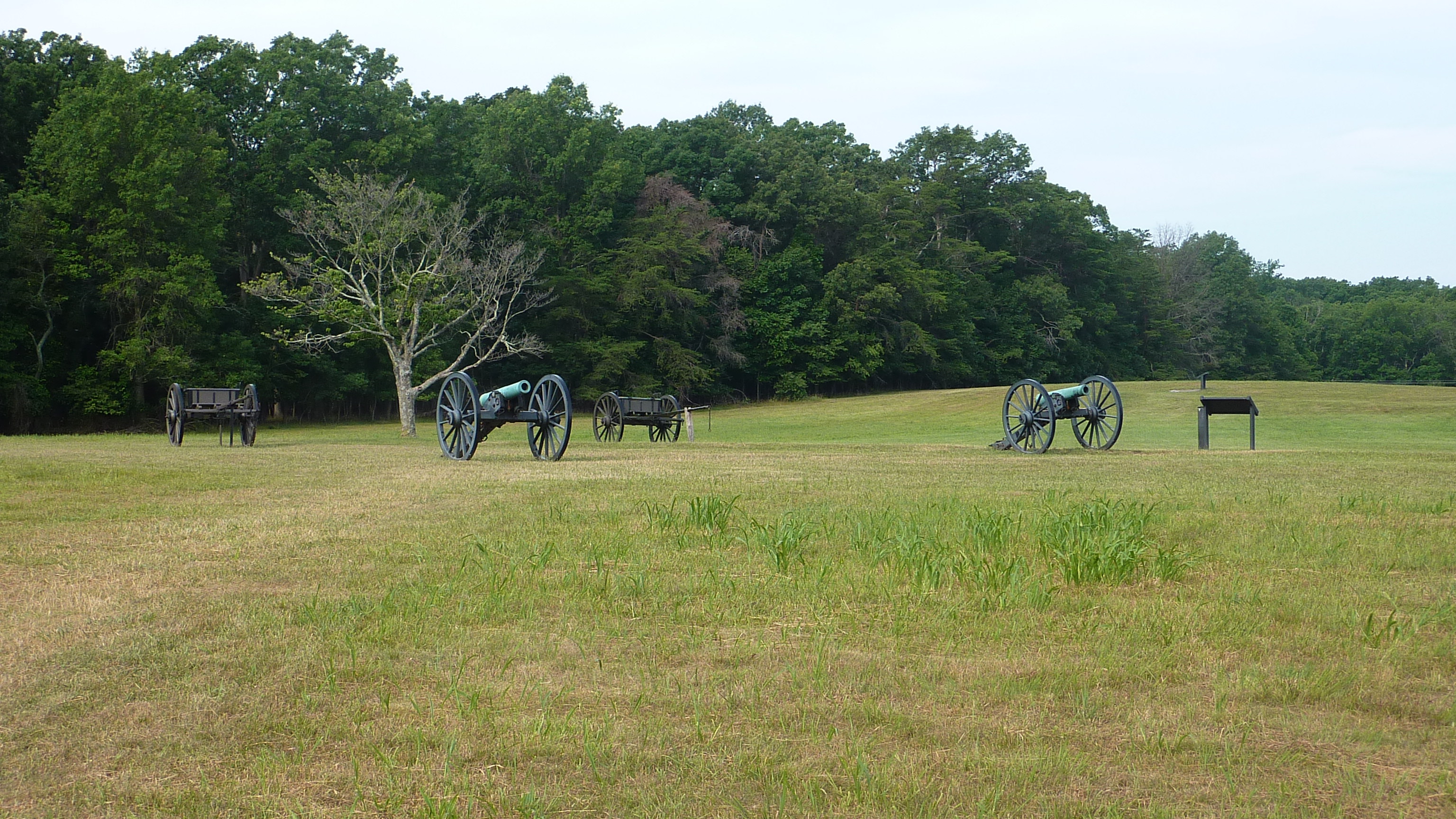
- Two Union Howitzers placed in the flanking position which they held during the First Battle of Bull Run
- Location: Bull Run, Virginia
- Coordinates: 38°48′53″N 77°31′22″W
- Part of: Manassas National Battlefield Park (ID66000039)

Henry House Hill is a location near Bull Run, a tributary of the Occoquan River, in the U.S. state of Virginia. It was an important battle site during the American Civil War.

== History ==
Named for the house of the Henry family that sits atop it, the hill begins near the road of Centreville, Virginia, after Gainesville, Virginia, to today's U.S. Route 29, the Warrenton Turnpike. It is a slow, constant rise toward the south over a length of approximately 2,400 feet (730 m).

This hill was an important site of the battles of First and Second Bull Run (also known as First and Second Manassas) in the American Civil War. The battle raged on the north side of the hill in predominantly open grass country; the south side was relatively closely covered with trees. The hill received its name from Dr. Isaac Henry, who lived with his family in a house on the plateau of the hill. On July 21, 1861, the house was inhabited by his widow, Judith Carter Henry, and their two sons. The 85-year-old woman was bed-ridden and unable to leave the house. Mrs. Henry was mortally wounded when a projectile of the Union artillery crashed through the bedroom wall and tore off one of her feet and inflicted multiple injuries, from which she died later that day.

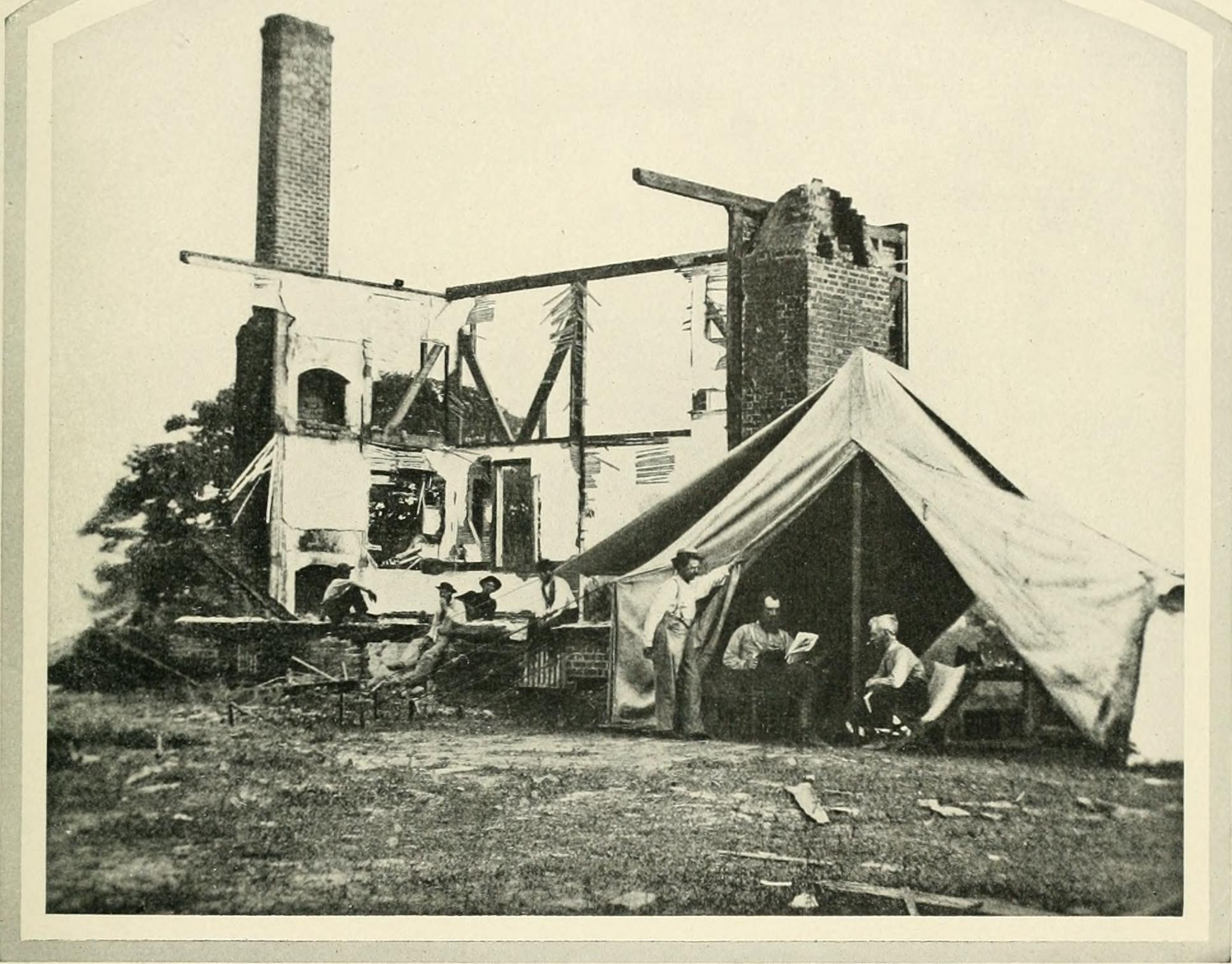
The house after the First Battle of Bull Run.

During the First Battle of Bull Run, Brig. Gen. Thomas J. Jackson and his Confederate soldiers had taken up positions on Henry House Hill. The 14th Brooklyn, 11th New York, and 1st Minnesota were placed into position by Major William Farquhar Barry, McDowell's chief of artillery, at the crest of Henry House Hill. They were ordered to hold their position and assault if the opportunity was there, but were under no circumstances to leave the guns to the Confederates. The three regiments and cannon found themselves confronting the 33rd Virginia Infantry on the left of General Jackson's line.

Confusion soon gripped the Union line of battle. Assuming the 33rd Virginia, clad in dark blue frock coats and dark blue trousers, were the Union troops supporting the guns, Major Barry ordered Ricketts to hold his fire. This allowed the Virginians to charge the batteries and capture the guns. The 14th Brooklyn, however, rushed up the slope and drove the 33rd Virginia back, recapturing the two guns. The 14th then continued to fire into the left flank of Jackson's line, driving the 33rd Virginia back through the 2nd Virginia Infantry. Under the pressure from the 14th Brooklyn, a large portion of the 2nd Virginia joined the retreating 33rd Virginia and the left of Jackson's line began to collapse. However, Jackson ordered the 4th and 27th Virginia forward. They were joined by the 49th Virginia Infantry, two companies of the 2nd Mississippi Infantry, and the 6th North Carolina Infantry. In hand-to-hand combat the New Yorkers were driven back to the Manassas-Sudley Road and Ricketts' battery and Griffin's two guns captured. In the midst of the combat on Henry Hill, Brig. Gen. Barnard Bee shouted to his men, "There is Jackson standing like a stone wall. Let us determine to die here, and we will conquer. Follow me." That gave Thomas Jackson the famous nickname "Stonewall." In the retreat from the hill, a Union wagon tipped over on Cub Run Bridge, blocking the Federal retreat, causing many of the undisciplined volunteers to drop their rifles and run.

== National Park ==
Henry House Hill is preserved as part of the Manassas National Battlefield Park. The National Park Service has a dedicated hiking path for visitors to Henry Hill, the "Henry Hill Loop Trail".
