= Louisville Herald-Post =

Defunct newspaper published in Louisville, Kentucky, United States

The Louisville Herald-Post
- Type: Daily newspaper
- Format: Broadsheet
- Owner(s): James Buckner Brown, 1925-1930; bankruptcy receiver 1930-1931; John B. Gallagher; 1931-1933; Walter H. Girdler; 1933-1936
- Founded: 1925
- Ceased publication: 1936
- Language: English
- Headquarters: Louisville, Kentucky, U.S.

The Louisville Herald-Post was a newspaper that was published in Louisville, Kentucky.

== Origins ==
The Herald-Post was created in 1925 from the merging of the old Louisville Herald and Louisville Post newspapers. Louisville financier James Buckner Brown (1872–1940) sought to operate the paper as a counter to the positions of the Bingham newspapers the Louisville Times and the Courier-Journal. The Louisville Post's former editor Lewis Craig Humphrey became associate editor of the Louisville Herald-Post.

Brown invested nearly five million dollars in the combined newspapers.

== Bankruptcy and new ownership ==
Brown lost his fortune in 1930 when his bank holding company BancoKentucky failed. After the BancoKentucky's failure, Brown had to reduce the newspapers expenditures and it suffered in quality as a result.

== John B. Gallagher ==
In December 1930 The Herald-Post was put into bankruptcy. John B. Gallagher, a New York City advertiser purchased the newspaper in a bankruptcy receiver's sale for $315,000.

== Walter H. Girdler ==
Walter H. Girdler Sr., President of Girdler Corporation, purchased a large portion of the stock in The Herald-Post in 1933 and took over control of the newspaper.

== Bankruptcy and closure ==
The paper went bankrupt again in 1936 and this time it ceased publication and was closed.

== See also ==
- History of Louisville, Kentucky

== Bibliography ==
- History of The Herald-Post from the University of Louisville Libraries.
- Herald-Post Collection from the University of Louisville Photographic Archives.
- Kleber, John E: The Kentucky Encyclopedia pages 127–128, (1992).
- Kleber, John E: The Encyclopedia of Louisville pages 655–656, (2001).
- New York Times, JAMES B. BROWN, KENTUCKY BANKER; Former Bookkeeper Who Rose to Be Head of $50,000,000 Banco Corp. Dies at 68 LOST FORTUNE IN CRASH Publisher of the Old Louisville Herald-Post Had Been Tax Receiver for the City page 15, (October 26, 1940).
