= George Griffiths (cricketer) =

Australian cricketer (born 1938)

Personal information
- Born: 9 April 1938 (age 88); Sydney, Australia
- Source: ESPNcricinfo, 30 December 2016

George Griffiths (born 9 April 1938) is an Australian cricketer. He played nineteen first-class matches for New South Wales and South Australia between 1962/63 and 1967/68.

== See also ==
- List of New South Wales representative cricketers
- List of South Australian representative cricketers
