= Moses F. Odell =

American politician (1818–1866)

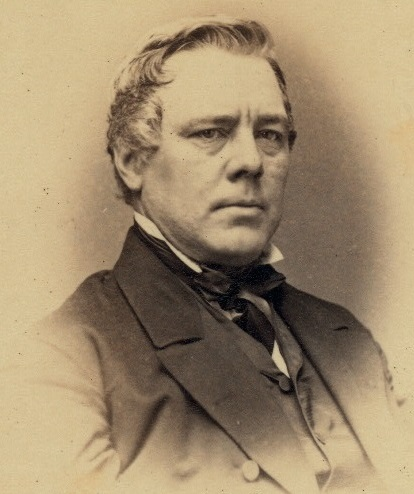
- Odell, c. 1861

Member of the U.S. House of Representatives from New York
- In office March 4, 1861 – March 3, 1865
- Preceded by: James Humphrey (2nd); Benjamin Wood (3rd)
- Succeeded by: Martin Kalbfleisch (2nd); James Humphrey (3rd)
- Constituency: 2nd district (1861–63); 3rd district (1863–65)

Personal details
- Born: Moses Fowler Odell; February 24, 1818 Tarrytown, New York, USA
- Died: June 13, 1866 (aged 48) Brooklyn, New York, USA
- Resting place: Greenwood Cemetery
- Party: Democratic

Moses Fowler Odell (February 24, 1818 – June 13, 1866) was a 19th-century American politician who served two terms as a U.S. representative from New York during the American Civil War.

== Biography ==
Born in Tarrytown, New York, Odell completed preparatory studies. He was appointed entry clerk in the New York customhouse in 1845 and became public appraiser.

=== Congress ===
Odell was elected as a Democrat to the Thirty-seventh and Thirty-eighth Congresses (March 4, 1861 – March 3, 1865). He served as chairman of the Committee on Expenditures in the Department of the Treasury (Thirty-seventh Congress), and also served on the United States Congress Joint Committee on the Conduct of the War during the American Civil War. He was one of 14 House Democrats to vote in favor of the Thirteenth Amendment to the United States Constitution on its second and final vote, and also one of 4 to vote in favor of it on its first vote.

=== Later career and death ===
He was appointed Navy agent at the city of New York in 1865 and served until his death in Brooklyn, New York, June 13, 1866.

He was interred in Greenwood Cemetery.

U.S. House of Representatives
Preceded by James Humphrey	Member of the U.S. House of Representatives from New York's 2nd congressional district 1861–1863	Succeeded by Martin Kalbfleisch
Preceded by Benjamin Wood	Member of the U.S. House of Representatives from New York's 3rd congressional district 1863–1865	Succeeded by James Humphrey
