= Martin Kalbfleisch =

American politician

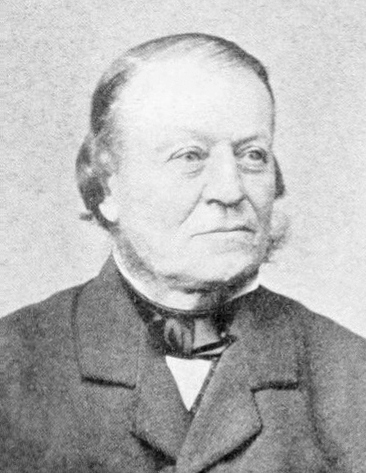
- Born: February 8, 1804; Flushing, Netherlands
- Died: February 12, 1873 (aged 69); Brooklyn, New York, U.S
- Occupations: Mayor of Brooklyn, New York, United States Representative

Martin Kalbfleisch (February 8, 1804 – February 12, 1873) was a Dutch pioneer in the chemical industry, mayor of the city of Brooklyn, New York, and a United States representative from New York during the American Civil War. He served one term in the U.S. House from 1863 to 1865.

== Early life ==
Born in Flushing, Netherlands, Kalbfleisch attended the public schools where he studied chemistry. At the age of eighteen, he embarked with an American captain to engage in trading in Sumatra, but returned on account of cholera. Forming a partnership with an American, he carried on business in Le Havre, France, for four years.

== Immigration to the United States ==
Kalbfleisch immigrated to the United States and settled in New York City in 1826, where he engaged in the manufacture and sale of paints. He was health warden in 1832, school trustee in 1836, and established a chemical factory at Greenpoint in 1844. He was Town Supervisor of Bushwick from 1852 to 1854 and was an unsuccessful candidate for mayor of the City of Brooklyn in 1854. He was an alderman in Brooklyn from 1855 to 1861 and mayor from 1862 to 1864.

== Later life ==
Kalbfleisch was elected as a Democrat to the Thirty-eighth Congress, holding office from March 4, 1863, to March 3, 1865. He voted against the Thirteenth Amendment to the United States Constitution. He was a delegate to the Union National Convention at Philadelphia in 1866, and was again mayor of Brooklyn from 1867 to 1871. He was an unsuccessful independent candidate for reelection and retired from active pursuits. Kalbfleisch died in Brooklyn. He is interred at Green-Wood Cemetery.

== Notes ==
U.S. House of Representatives
Preceded by Moses F. Odell	Member of the U.S. House of Representatives from New York's 2nd congressional district 1863–1865	Succeeded by Teunis G. Bergen
