= College Street Presbyterian Church =

Historic church in Kentucky, United States

- U.S. National Register of Historic Places
- Location within Kentucky Location within the United States
- Location: 113 W. College St., Louisville, Kentucky
- Coordinates: 38°14′36″N 85°45′18″W
- Area: 0.1 acres (0.040 ha)
- Built: 1867
- Architect: Stirewalt, John
- Architectural style: Greek Revival
- NRHP reference No.: 78001350
- Added to NRHP: November 29, 1978

College Street Presbyterian Church, also known as Louisville Bible Church, is a historic church at 113 W. College Street in Louisville, Kentucky. It was built in 1867 and added to the National Register in 1978.

It was designed by architect John Shirewalt (1811–1871), who studied under New York architects Ithiel Town and Alexander Jackson Davis.

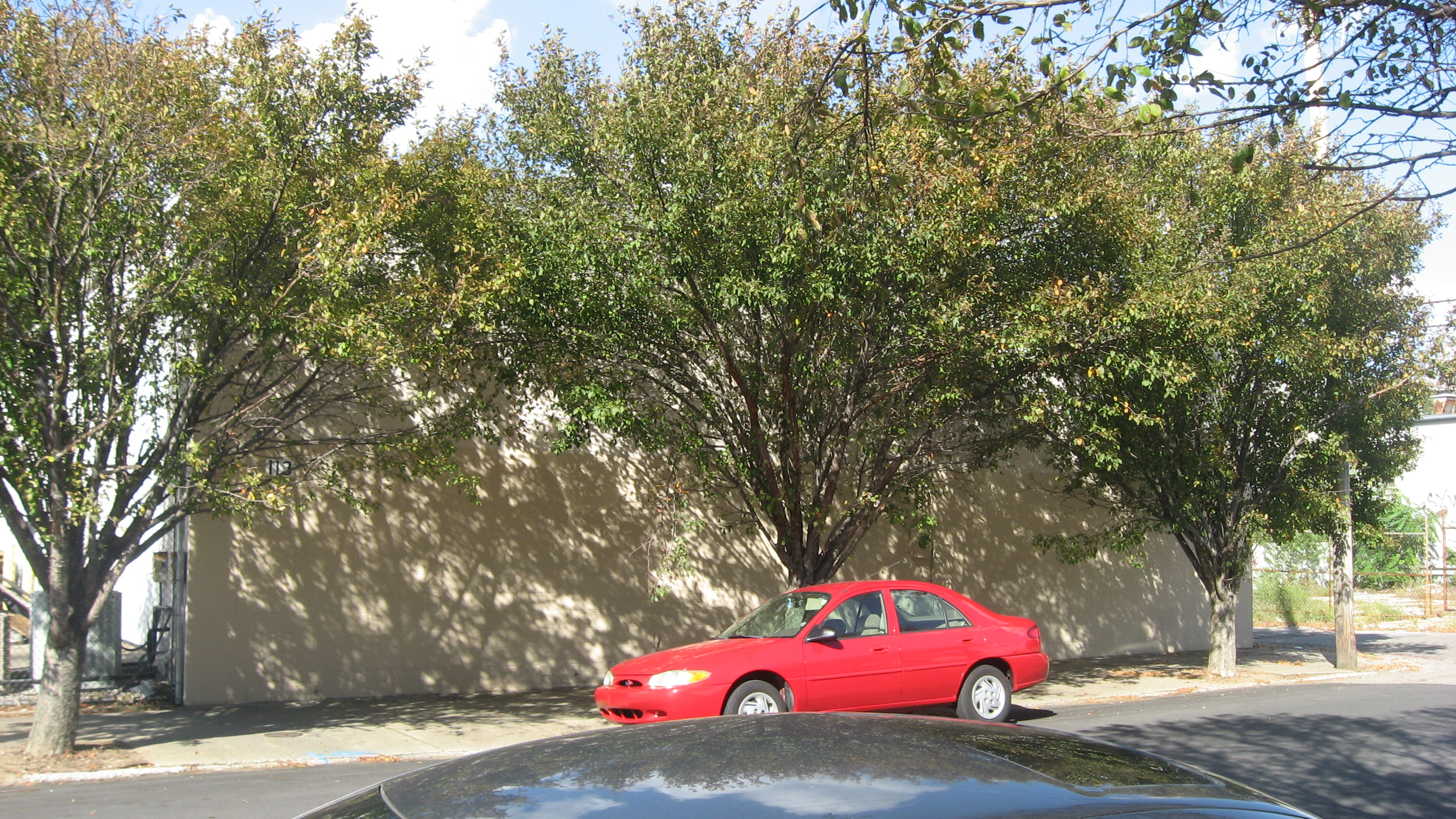
Site of the church

The church may no longer exist.
