= Heman Humphrey =

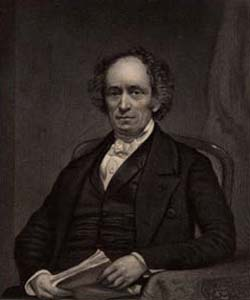

President of Amherst College
- In office 1823–1845
- Preceded by: Zephaniah Swift Moore
- Succeeded by: Edward Hitchcock

Personal details
- Born: March 26, 1779 West Simsbury, Connecticut
- Died: April 3, 1861 (aged 82) Pittsfield, Massachusetts
- Spouse: Sophia Porter (1785-1868)
- Children: James Humphrey (New York politician)
- Education: Yale University

Heman Humphrey (March 26, 1779 – April 3, 1861) was a 19th-century American author and clergyman who served as a trustee of Williams College and afterward as the second president of Amherst College, a post he held for 22 years.

== Early life and education ==
Humphrey was born in West Simsbury, Hartford County, Connecticut (which became Canton, Connecticut) to farmer Solomon Humphrey, of a family that came from England before 1643, and Hannah, daughter of Captain John Brown. His family moved to present-day Burlington, Connecticut at the age of six. He taught at local schools starting at age 15. He worked as a farm laborer for John Treadwell before entering university.

Humphrey graduated from Yale University with an A.M. in 1805 and was ordained a Congregational minister on March 16, 1807. He became a minister in Fairfield, Connecticut, in 1807, moving to Pittsfield, Massachusetts, in 1817. His 1813 report to the Fairfield Association is one of the earliest temperance tracts published in America. Humphrey is also said to have published six articles in The Panoplist and Missionary Magazine on the cause, origin, effects and remedy of intemperance.

Following his tenure at Williams College, in 1823 he was appointed president of Amherst. He was elected a Fellow of the American Academy of Arts and Sciences in 1842. Humphrey was influential in the nineteenth-century temperance movement and typical of the early proponents of prohibition. He was the father of U.S. Representative James Humphrey.

== Bibliography ==
- Humphrey, Heman (1813). Intemperance: an address, to the churches and congregations of the Western district of Fairfield County. New Haven, Connecticut: Eli Hudson. p. 31.
- Humphrey, Heman (1826). Debates of conscience, with a distiller, wholesale dealer, and a retailer. New York: American Tract Society. p. 16.
- Humphrey, Heman (1828). Parallel Between Intemperance and the Slave Trade: An Address Delivered at Amherst College, July 4, 1828. Amherst, MA: J. S. & C. Adams. p. 42 – via Google Books.
- Humphrey, Heman (1854). The Missouri Compromise. Pittsfield, Massachusetts: Reed, Hull & Peirson. pp. 32. OL 7171247M – via Internet Archive.
- Humphrey, Heman (1859). Revival Sketches and Manual: in Two Parts. Pittsfield, Massachusetts: American Tract Society. OL 6363048M – via Internet Archive.

Academic offices
Preceded by Zephaniah Swift Moore	President of Amherst College; 1823–1845	Succeeded by Edward Hitchcock
