= Barry Bingham =

Barry Bingham may refer to:

- Barry Bingham Sr. (1906–1988), American media executive
- Barry Bingham Jr. (1933–2006), American media executive, son of the above
- Edward Bingham (1881–1939), Royal Navy admiral and Victoria Cross recipient
