= WHAS =

WHAS may refer to:

- WHAS (AM), a radio station (840 AM) licensed to Louisville, Kentucky, United States
- WHAS-TV, a television station (channel 11 analog/55 digital) licensed to Louisville, Kentucky, United States
- Wet Hot American Summer, a 2001 film
