= WHAS Crusade for Children =

Annual telethon for children's charities in Louisville, KY, US

The WHAS Crusade for Children is an annual telethon broadcast by WHAS-TV and WHAS (AM) Radio in Louisville, Kentucky. The telethon benefits a wide range of children's charities throughout Kentucky and southern Indiana.

The Crusade was begun in 1954, in large part through the efforts of Barry Bingham Sr., the patriarch of the family that owned the stations and The Courier-Journal newspaper together. (WHAS-TV is currently under the ownership of Tegna, Inc.—spun off in 2015 from Gannett Company, which still owns the Courier-Journal — while WHAS Radio is now owned by iHeartMedia) The first telethon was telecast from the Memorial Auditorium, and featured actor Pat O'Brien as the celebrity guest. Contributions on the first telethon totaled more than $156,000.

The 2025 telethon, the 72nd of the series, was broadcast on June 7-8 and raised $5,890,189.77.

The total does not include bequests, which go into a special endowment set up in 2004 that is used to pay the expenses of the Crusade organization so that 100 percent of all monies collected by the public go directly to children's special needs, a practice that the Crusade promotes in many of its promotions. The record tote board total for the Crusade, not including bequests, was more than $6 million (2004, the 50th edition).

The Crusade has become a major local institution. For months before the telethon broadcast each June, grass-roots collection efforts are held throughout the area—from "pickle jars" at restaurants, to bingo games, to benefit concerts and hundreds of similar events.

In the early days of television, local telethons were quite common. In recent years, most local telethons gave way to well-produced national telethons such as the Jerry Lewis MDA Telethon, but many of those have since fallen by the wayside while the Crusade rolls on. The Crusade for Children may be an anachronism, but a hugely successful one. It is by far the most successful local telethon in America, by almost any measure, though its outreach has grown well past the Louisville metro area. It is second in longevity only to a local telethon in Green Bay, Wisconsin on WBAY-TV that benefits those with cerebral palsy; that telethon was first produced in March 1954, seven months before the first Crusade for Children.

The Crusade broadcast is normally held on the first weekend of June each year, beginning on Saturday afternoon and ending sometime on Sunday night (in past years, it occasionally even into the wee hours of Monday). In 2020, the Crusade was postponed because of the COVID-19 pandemic to August 8–9, with most of the broadcast done in large or outdoor venues to facilitate social distancing. The telethon resumed its traditional dates in 2021.

== The firefighters ==
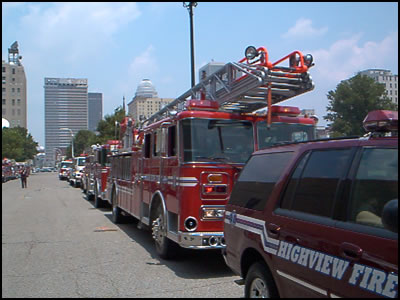
Fire departments are preparing to go on-air with the WHAS Crusade for Children; this one is the Highview, Kentucky Fire Dept.

The backbone of the collection efforts, and the signature of the Crusade itself, are the dozens of local fire departments who collect millions of dollars each year. Most of those donations come at road blocks set up at hundreds of intersections throughout the region, where firefighters ask motorists to put donations in boots. On a Saturday or Sunday in late spring, it's not uncommon for someone driving across metro Louisville to encounter multiple road blocks staffed by volunteers.

During the telethon, each fire department brings in those donations, dumping them out of the boots and into "fishbowls" (aquarium-like containers) before the cameras. Before the "dump," a representative from each department usually reads a list of significant contributors, businesses who helped the department during fund-raising efforts, and numerous others who helped in any way, a process which can be lengthy. Crusade organizers have tried to streamline the process of the years in the same way awards shows have attempted to reduce acceptance speeches to reduce time, to mixed results.

In the past, the fire departments brought the collections directly to the television studio, parading their trucks down the street outside with sirens blaring. But the number of participating departments has become so large that in recent years, remote broadcasts are set up in outlying communities such as Elizabethtown, Corydon and elsewhere, which also allows those fire departments to keep their equipment and trucks in their areas to allow emergency deployment. The increase in fire department donations forced the Crusade to broadcast a pre-telethon show, featuring the departmental reports and remotes from across the area. In 2007, Crusade organizers simply moved the official start of the broadcast to 1:30 p.m. local time, with a one-hour break for local and network newscasts. The 2008 Crusade followed a similar schedule, except for a two-hour break Saturday afternoon for the ABC broadcast of the 2008 Belmont Stakes; the telethon broadcast its final total during halftime of Sunday night's ABC broadcast of Game 2 of the 2008 NBA Finals. In 2011 the Crusade ended at 6:30 p.m., in order to clear the 2011 NBA Finals, the earliest on-air finish in many years; since then, the telethon has ended at or near the same time, mainly because of the NBA Finals commitment.

Departments compete each year to win the Jim Walton Trophy, given to departments that record the largest percentage increase in donations from the previous year. The trophy is named for Jim Walton, a WHAS-TV personality who was the Crusade's master of ceremonies for 26 years and was its first executive director. Fire department collections typically account for more than half of the Crusade's final total each year.

== On-air performers ==
Almost every Crusade features a celebrity guest, who usually performs on Saturday night during a variety-show segment that leads off the traditional Crusade telecast. In 2006, Peabo Bryson made his second appearance as the headline guest, and returned for his third in 2013. In 2007, The Kentucky Headhunters—whose origins are in Edmonton, Kentucky—are the headliners. Other past guests have included magicians Lance Burton and Mac King (two Las Vegas headliners with roots in Louisville), Kenny Rogers, Lee Greenwood, Steve Wariner, Ricky Skaggs, Tammy Wynette, Alan Thicke, Bobby Goldsboro, B. J. Thomas, Florence Henderson, Diahann Carroll, McLean Stevenson, Merv Griffin, Eydie Gorme, and Cab Calloway.

Larnelle Harris, a popular Gospel singer and Louisville resident, has appeared on many Crusade telecasts. Magicians Mac King and Lance Burton, both Kentucky natives, have been featured on several Crusade broadcasts. Other local artists with multiple Crusade appearances include Melissa Combs, JoAnn Hale, Judy Marshall, Karen Kraft and Kiks, The Monarchs, and Louisville's Thoroughbred Chorus, a world champion men's barbershop chorus. Mel Owen directed the Crusade Orchestra for many decades.

WHAS radio and television personality Terry Meiners and WHAS-TV news anchor Shay McAlister are the co-hosts of the Crusade telecast. Longtime WHAS radio and television host Milton Metz is one of a handful of people who have been involved with every Crusade since the inaugural event; he appeared on every Crusade until his death in 2016.

The Crusade broadcast goes on through Saturday night and Sunday morning, as is traditional with most telethons, but some of the overnight portion of the show consists of segments taped beforehand.

== Broadcast and webcast outlets ==
In recent years, all or portions of the Crusade have been telecast by stations other than WHAS television and radio. In 2007, television stations in Bowling Green (WBKO), Lexington (WKYT), Paducah (WQTV/WQWQ) and Hazard (WYMT-TV) carried portions of the broadcast, as well as sister station (WBKI-TV) in Louisville. Starting in 2010, WBKO has carried remote broadcasts of its own from locations in south Central Kentucky.

On radio, stations from the Commonwealth Broadcasting Company group carried the telecast in Bowling Green, Glasgow, Bardstown, Campbellsville, Princeton, Madisonville and Elizabethtown.

The Crusade is also webcast via the WHAS-TV website and on the Crusade's Facebook page.

== Where the money goes ==
Throughout the year, various agencies throughout Kentucky and southern Indiana apply for grants from the Crusade. These applications are evaluated, and grants are made by the Crusade Advisory Panel, a group of local clergy. This task was originally administered by the panel of The Moral Side of the News, a long-running public affairs program on WHAS-TV and Radio where local clergy discuss current events. (The program remains one of the longest-running continually aired broadcasts of any kind in radio history.) In later years, the panel's Crusade duties grew larger than the program, hence the name change in recent years; additionally, other members outside of the show have been added to the panel, so that the Moral Side panel members are now a subset of the Crusade Advisory Panel.

Grants are made in all 120 Kentucky counties and in 50 Indiana counties. The Crusade returns donations from a certain area to that area—for instance, donations from Hardin County will be assigned to grant requests from that county. This has been Crusade policy since the beginning. All grants are on an annual basis; thus, charities must reapply each year. Grant requests typically total about three times the amount collected.

The Crusade prides itself in the fact that 100% of all donations go directly to grants, a fact particularly emphasized in its 2011 campaign and later. All overhead costs of the Crusade organization are covered by donations from businesses, and more recently from proceeds of an endowment set up for that purpose. During the years of Bingham family ownership of WHAS, the stations and the family covered many of such costs themselves.

Former Jefferson County Judge-Executive Rebecca Jackson was named the Crusade's executive director in 2005. Jackson was the first Crusade director to come from outside the WHAS corporate organization. She replaced Dan Miller, a longtime WHAS-TV employee who left in 2004 to become vice president at Georgetown College in Georgetown, Kentucky. Jackson retired at the end of 2008. Dawn Dison Lee became the current Crusade director in February 2009.

== Charges against chairman ==
In 2010, an indictment was brought against Paul Barth, chairman of the Crusade's board of directors and then chief of the McMahan Fire Protection District volunteer fire department. The charges accused Barth of federal mail fraud, money laundering and embezzlement, among other charges. Barth was accused of embezzling at least $189,000 from the Crusade. Barth faced trial in October 2011, Barth pleaded guilty to 15 felony counts in June 2012. As part of a plea bargain agreement, the court ordered him to pay full restitution to the WHAS Crusade for Children and sentenced him to 41 months in federal prison without any possibility of an early parole.

As a result of the incident, tighter controls have been placed on money as it comes in to the Crusade. Money is placed in secure money bags by firefighters, and is deposited on arrival at the studio or remote broadcast location. The traditional pouring of money from boots and buckets into fishbowls during the broadcast now is merely a prop utilizing a smaller amount of money for show, with the contributed amount pre-counted and revealed at that time.

== See also ==
- List of attractions and events in the Louisville metropolitan area
