= Lachlan McLean (news anchor) =

Lachlan McLean is a news anchor for Spectrum News 1, a 24-hour cable news network serving the state of Kentucky. He has been the primary 5:00pm anchor since the network debuted in November 2018.

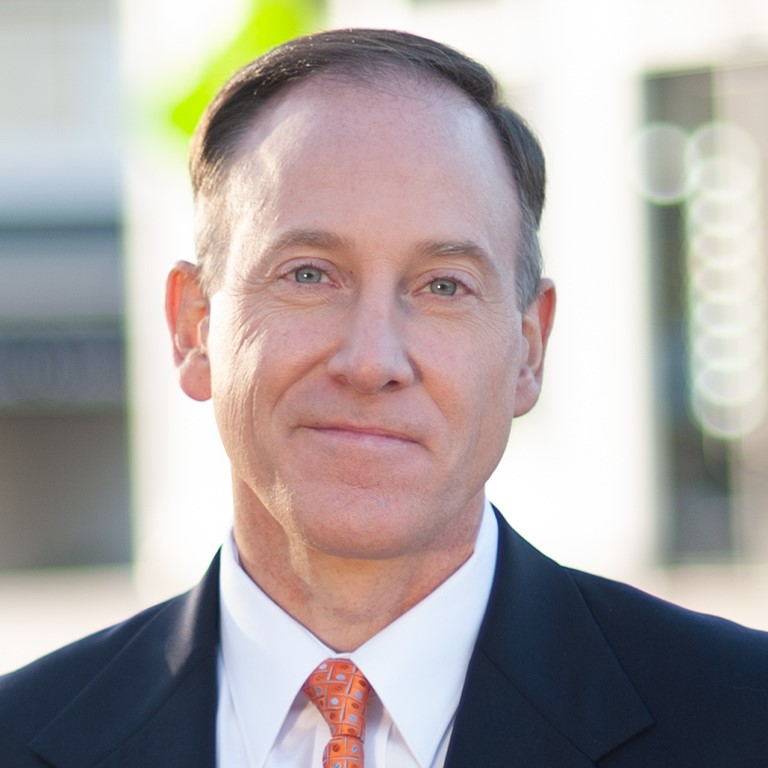

He formerly hosted "The Midday Rush" sports talk radio show on ESPN680 (WHBE). The show aired from March 2016 to August 2020 from 10:00am-12:00n ET. He co-hosted with Andy Sweeney for the first three years of the show until Sweeney moved to afternoons in 2019 and McLean was a solo host for the final year of the show.

Prior to ESPN Louisville, he was host of the popular radio show "Sports Talk 840" (formerly "Sports Talk 84"), weeknights on WHAS-AM radio in Louisville, hosting from July 2004 to May 2015. He also delivered the afternoon sportscasts for the Terry Meiners Show. In February 2015, McLean announced he would leave the show to move to Charlotte, North Carolina after his wife got a job there. In April 2015, WHAS-AM announced it would discontinue the sports talk show after his departure, ending a tradition that started in the 1980s. In January 2016 McLean moved back to Louisville with his family.

Before his radio career, McLean worked as a television sports Anchor/Reporter at WFXL-TV in Albany, Georgia, WRDW-TV in Augusta, Georgia and WHAS-TV in Louisville. He also worked in station promotions for WBKI-TV in Louisville.

He graduated from the University of Virginia with an Economics degree in 1989 and was a corporate finance analyst for Lehman Brothers in New York City. His first sports job was a production position at ESPN in 1992.

He is married to former WAVE-TV reporter Carolyn Gaeta and they have two daughters.
