= David Dick (journalist) =

American journalist (1930–2010)

- Born: David Barrow Dick; February 18, 1930; Cincinnati, Ohio, U.S.
- Died: June 16, 2010 (aged 80); Bourbon County, Kentucky
- Resting place: North Middletown, Kentucky
- Education: University of Kentucky
- Occupations: 1959-1966 WHAS Radio & WHAS TV Writer & Journalist; 1966-1985 CBS News Television journalist Author; Professor
- Spouses: Rose Ann Casale (m. 1953–1978) Eulalie Cumbo "Lalie" (m. 1978–2010)

David Barrow Dick (1930 – 2010), was an American journalist. He was an Emmy-winning correspondent for CBS News from 1966 to 1985. He became a professor of journalism at the University of Kentucky after retiring from CBS News.

== Early life and education ==
David Dick was born on 18 Feb 1930 in Cincinnati, Ohio. He was raised in Bourbon County, Kentucky, where he attended school, and later after graduation, he attended the University of Kentucky where he obtained his bachelor's and later master's degrees in English Literature. He served in the US Navy during the Korean War.

== Career at CBS ==
From 1959 to 1966, Dick worked at WHAS Radio and WHAS TV in Louisville, where he served as a writer before advancing to an on-air journalist. From 1966 to 1985 he was a correspondent with CBS News anchored by Walter Cronkite.

His assignment locations included Washington, D.C., Atlanta, Georgia, and Dallas, Texas. He also worked as Bureau Chief for CBS' Latin America Bureau in Caracas. While in Dallas, he covered Mexico, Central, and South America.

He won an Emmy for his coverage of the attempted assassination of George Wallace during his bid for president in 1972. He covered the aftermath of the mass suicides in Guyana.

== Later life and legacy ==
Upon retirement, Dick became an Associate Professor of Journalism at the University of Kentucky. He also wrote a column for Kentucky Living magazine. He wrote and publish several books including "Follow the Storm" in 2002.

He died from prostate cancer on July 16, 2010, in Bourbon County, Kentucky. He is buried North Middletown Cemetery in North Middletown, Kentucky.

The University of Kentucky created The David Dick "What a Great Story!" Storytelling Awards program in his memory.

== Works by David Dick ==
- A Journal for Lalie: Living Through Prostate Cancer
- Peace at the Center
- A Conversation with Peter P. Pence
- The Quiet Kentuckians
- The Scourges of Heaven
- Follow the Storm: A Long Way Home
- Jesse Stuart – The Heritage, a look at the Kentucky author Jesse Stuart
- The View from Plum Lick

With his wife Lalie Dick, he co-authored:

- Home Sweet Kentucky
- Rivers of Kentucky
- Kentucky: A State of Mind.
