= Milton Metz =

American broadcaster

- Born: c. 1921; Cleveland, Ohio, U.S.
- Died: January 12, 2017 (aged 95) near Louisville, Kentucky
- Occupations: Radio and television talk show host
- Years active: 1946–2017
- Employer(s): WHAS (AM), WHAS-TV
- Television: WHAS Crusade for Children

Milton Metz (c. 1921 – January 12, 2017) was an American radio and television personality in Louisville, Kentucky. He occasionally did commercial work for local radio and television stations until he was unable to due to his health in the last year of his life.

== Personal life ==
Metz was born in Cleveland, Ohio. In the 1930 census he is listed as eight years old, living in Cleveland with his father, Russian-born Solomon Metz, his mother, English-born Sarah (Silverman) Metz, and two older sisters, Florance and Mildred. He attended Ohio State University.

Little is publicized about Metz's personal life, including his age. In an interview with columnist Tom Dorsey of The Courier-Journal just prior to the end of his radio show in 1993, Metz would only say, "Let's just say I'm older than Diane Sawyer and younger than Mike Wallace." Wallace was 75 at the time.

== Broadcast career ==
"El Metzo", as he was known to fans, was best known for his work at WHAS (AM) radio, which began in 1946. His call-in show, Metz Here, which began its run on July 20, 1959 (with the title Juniper-5-2385), and ended on June 10, 1993. Though records aren't clear on the subject — Larry King began his first local show a year before, but it isn't clear if he took calls on the air — Metz Here is believed to be one of the first call-in shows on radio, pioneering a format that is in widespread use today as talk radio. Metz usually featured guests, and was always kind (almost to a fault) to both guests and callers. Thanks to the station's 50,000-watt clear channel AM signal, Metz Here was heard by listeners in 40 states and much of Canada.

Metz was also widely seen on local television, serving as co-host and co-producer of Omelet, a morning–lunchtime talk and news program on WHAS-TV, and was the station's weatherman for 19 years. He also interviewed countless celebrities on the first Saturday in May during WHAS-TV's traditional marathon pre-race show before the Kentucky Derby, where he was a fixture on "Millionaire's Row", home to well-heeled spectators in the clubhouse of Churchill Downs. Metz later pared down his work to a series of daily 90-second commentaries on WHAS radio. They were discontinued around the turn of the century, and his voice heard almost exclusively on local commercials, though he still participated annually in the WHAS Crusade for Children telethon—as he had since the very first Crusade in 1954.

Metz also recorded talking books for the American Printing House for the Blind through 1980.

Metz was inducted into the University of Kentucky Journalism Hall of Fame in 1989. He was also named as a Gold Circle Honoree in 2009 by the Ohio Valley Chapter of the National Academy of Television Arts and Sciences.

Metz died on January 12, 2017, at the age of 95, at a senior-care facility near Louisville where he lived after a rehabilitation stint for injuries suffered in a fall in 2016. His wife Mimi died a few months beforehand.

== See also ==
- List of people from the Louisville metropolitan area
