= Hugh Haynie =

American cartoonist

Hugh Smith Haynie
- Born: February 6, 1927; Reedville, Virginia, U.S.
- Died: November 30, 1999 (aged 72)
- Education: College of William and Mary; University of Louisville
- Occupation: Political cartoonist
- Years active: 1958–1996
- Employer: Louisville Courier-Journal
- Military career
- Allegiance: United States
- Branch: U.S. Coast Guard
- Conflicts: World War II; Korean War

Hugh Smith Haynie (February 6, 1927 – November 30, 1999) was an American political cartoonist.

== Life ==
Haynie was born in Reedville, Virginia. He studied at the College of William and Mary in Virginia and at the University of Louisville in Kentucky. He also served in the United States Coast Guard during the end of World War II and the Korean War.

In 1958, Barry Bingham, Sr., hired Haynie to serve as a political cartoonist for the Louisville Courier-Journal, a position he held until his retirement in 1996, after which he was retained as an emeritus. His cartooning style was clean lined, heavily inked, and somewhat reminiscent of Al Capp. Haynie regularly penned his wife's name, Lois, into his drawings.

Haynie won several awards for his work. He won the Headliner Award in 1966, the Freedoms Foundation Medal in 1966 and 1970 and the Sigma Delta Chi award in 1972. The Kentucky Civil Liberties Union named him Civil Libertarian of the Year in 1978, and he was inducted into the Kentucky Journalism Hall of Fame in 1987.
