= Barry Bingham Jr. =

American businessman (1933–2006)

- Born: September 23, 1933
- Died: April 3, 2006 (aged 72); Louisville, Kentucky, U.S.
- Resting place: Cave Hill Cemetery, Louisville
- Education: Brooks School; Harvard University
- Occupations: Newspaper publisher; television and radio executive
- Spouse: Edith Wharton Stenhouse Franchini
- Children: 2, including Emily and Molly

George Barry Bingham Jr. (September 23, 1933 – April 3, 2006 in Louisville, Kentucky) was an American newspaper publisher and television and radio executive. He was the third and last generation of the Bingham family that controlled Louisville's daily newspapers, a television station, and two radio stations for much of the 20th century.

== Early life ==
Bingham was educated at Eaglebrook School, Brooks School and Harvard University.

"Barry Jr.," as he was almost always called, was the surviving son of Barry Bingham Sr. and the grandson of Robert Worth Bingham, who originally purchased controlling interest in The Courier-Journal and The Louisville Times in 1919. The original plan by Bingham Sr. was for Barry Jr. to control the family's broadcast properties, WHAS-AM-FM-TV, as well as the Standard Gravure rotogravure print plant. Robert Worth Bingham III (known as Worth), the brother of Barry Jr., was slated to run the newspapers, but Worth was killed in a freak driving accident at the age of 34 that broke his neck and killed him instantly in 1966 which changed the elder Bingham's plans, and Barry Jr. took over management of the newspapers in 1971. (His younger brother, Jonathan Worth Bingham, was electrocuted in an accident on the family estate in 1964 at the age of 22.)

== Career ==
Bingham Jr. was a different breed of newspaper publisher. Besides his distinctive mustache and fondness for Scottish Tam o' Shanters, Bingham Jr. was a stickler for journalistic ethics—sometimes to a fault, critics claimed—and public service that sometimes trumped profits. He insisted on professionalism at all levels, even to the point of insisting on the removal of his own wife, mother, and two sisters from the company board of directors. This ongoing struggle, particularly with sister Sallie Bingham, eventually led Bingham Sr., who remained chairman, to sell off the family media empire in 1986, with the newspapers being sold to Gannett Company, the radio stations to Clear Channel Communications, and WHAS-TV to The Providence Journal.

During the tenure of Bingham Jr., the C-J won Pulitzer Prizes in three separate years: 1976, for photography regarding of court-ordered public school busing and desegregation; 1978, for an investigation of the Beverly Hills Supper Club fire; and, 1980 for a series of stories and photos from Cambodia.

After the sale of the media properties, Bingham Jr. briefly published a newsletter about ethics in journalism. After that effort ended, he largely stayed out of the public light, surfacing only on occasion and then usually to criticize the management of the former Bingham companies. He also was an active supporter of and fund-raiser for Actors Theatre of Louisville and Bernheim Arboretum and Research Forest.

Bingham Jr. was particularly critical of Gannett's operation of The Courier-Journal, particularly its practice of running advertisements on the front page (in a banner across the very bottom) and its closing of the newspaper's regional bureaus throughout the state. Bingham Jr. had kept the bureau network in operation throughout his tenure, despite their high expense.

== Personal life ==
Barry Bingham Jr. died of respiratory failure on April 3, 2006, at his home in Louisville. He was survived by his wife, the former Edith Wharton Stenhouse Franchini; two daughters from their marriage, author Emily S. Bingham and Journalist and former CEO Mary C. Bingham (known as Molly); two stepsons from Edith's first marriage, Philip John Franchini and Charles Wharton Bingham; and the two sisters whom he fought for control of the media properties.

== See also ==
- List of people from the Louisville metropolitan area
