= Tampa newsroom hacking scandal =

1989 event

Between 1988 and 1989, two senior employees of WTSP, a television station in St. Petersburg, Florida, conspired to access the newsroom computer system of their rival, WTVT in Tampa. They obtained confidential information including coverage plans for news stories and details of contract information for WTVT's news anchors. After the access was uncovered, the men were arrested, fired by the station, and pleaded no contest to charges against them.

== Background ==
In 1988, television station WTSP in St. Petersburg, Florida, hired Terry Cole of KWCH-TV in Wichita, Kansas, as its new news director. At the time, the station was in third place in local news ratings. Cole's focus was to make WTSP news competitive with its rivals; his biggest priority was giving the station a news presence in the mornings, which debuted in January 1989, and he was interested in adding a second early evening newscast. Ratings appeared to be improving under Cole, though the change in direction also saw an increase in crime stories and an excessive use of live shots and so-called "exclusive" stories.

Cole's first newsroom hire was Michael Shapiro as news director. Shapiro came from Tampa Bay's market leader, WTVT, where he was the assignments manager, with responsibility for story planning and daily news coverage. Cole and Shapiro had worked together in the early 1980s at KTIV in Sioux City, Iowa. While at WTVT, Shapiro oversaw the installation and maintenance of WTVT's Basys newsroom computer system, which was installed in August 1988. When he was hired, he brought with him a manual for the Basys and a diskette which contained personnel files, among them copies of contracts for four WTVT news employees including anchor Hugh Smith. Another WTVT employee, Cary Williams, let Shapiro keep his password to the WTVT computer system, under the impression he could read sports wire copy and send him electronic messages.

== Unauthorized access and legal proceedings ==
From his home and from WTSP, at Cole's direction, Shapiro accessed WTVT's newsroom computer system on at least 14 occasions. Cole and Shapiro used the information to learn WTVT's plans for story coverage, notes from reporters' interviews, and the names of the station's sources. In addition to accessing WTVT, he accessed a server maintained by television news consultants Frank Magid and Associates, which worked with WTVT in the Tampa–St. Petersburg market. Shapiro frequently used information gleaned from the WTVT files to determine or change the order of stories aired on WTSP's evening newscasts, and he handed out copies of WTVT's coverage plans to staffers in WTSP news meetings. The accesses were not noticed until January 12, when WTVT's morning news producer found that stories, research files, and evening news files were missing. The files had been purged in a 54-minute period when someone on a personal computer had logged in. That login came from a code belonging to assistant news director Bob Franklin, but Franklin did not have a modem and had never used the codes. Shapiro, who had been trained on the Basys, denied any knowledge of the events. The station contacted the Florida Department of Law Enforcement (FDLE) and General Telephone Company of Florida. Because Shapiro had moved to St. Petersburg, calls back to WTVT in Tampa were traceable long-distance calls. General Telephone uncovered that he had dialed into the system from WTSP three times in early January, that the 54-minute phone call originated from Shapiro's new home phone, and that someone at Shapiro's home phone had attempted to log in to the system six times on January 26.

On February 7, 1989, the FDLE arrested Shapiro at his home and charged him with 14 felony counts of computer-related crime. WTVT reported that, at Cole's house, FDLE agents collected evidence including computer software and manuals that were still the property of WTVT. On a tip, state investigators later searched WTSP and found a folder hidden behind a storage shed that contained printouts of the personnel files. Rumors swirled in the WTSP newsroom over the presence of printouts from WTVT computer systems.

Cole and Shapiro were fired by WTSP on March 14. General manager Vince Barresi noted in a statement, "[A]s a news organization, we realize that if at all possible we must avoid any questions about the objective way we do our business in keeping the public informed through our newscast." Don North of WKRC-TV in Cincinnati, which was co-owned with WTSP, was seconded to Tampa to serve as the interim news director before the station hired Mel Martin of WJXT in Jacksonville the next month.

Though Cole was fired by WTSP, he was not charged by authorities until April 10. The two men pled no contest on May 19 and were sentenced by a Hillsborough County circuit judge to five years of probation, 250 hours of community service, and a small fine.

== Disposition ==
While the state could have pursued a racketeering case against WTSP to seize the station, it opted not to start a years-long, expensive case and reached a $750,000 settlement with the station; the money went to the state victims' assistance program as well as public service announcements and investigation costs. As part of the settlement, WTSP produced a new video to be shown to prospective jurors in Hillsborough County courts. Two computers used to access WTVT systems were obtained by the Florida Department of Law Enforcement, under a law allowing for the seizure of equipment used to commit a felony. WTVT and WTSP entered into an out-of-court settlement in October.

Cole returned to television news late in 1989 as the news director of KOTA-TV in Rapid City, South Dakota, later working at WOWK-TV and WCHS-TV in Charleston, West Virginia, and as the general manager of WGME in Portland, Maine, and WEAR-TV in Pensacola, Florida. Shapiro appeared at a panel at the Radio and Television News Directors Association conference that year.
