= Velocity (newspaper) =

Velocity's debut issue from December 3, 2003.

Velocity was a free, weekly newspaper published between December 3, 2003, and June 15, 2011, by The Courier-Journal of Louisville, Kentucky. It was discontinued during a round of budget cuts by Gannett.

== History ==
Velocity started in 2003 as a free youth-oriented tabloid. It routinely ran 104 colour pages and had a related online website called MetroMix. Initially, Velocity and The Courier-Journal never shared content, but this eventually changed.

In 2011, much of the Velocity staff was laid off, and it became part of The Courier-Journal rather than an independently distributed publication.
