= Mike McQueary =

American football player and coach

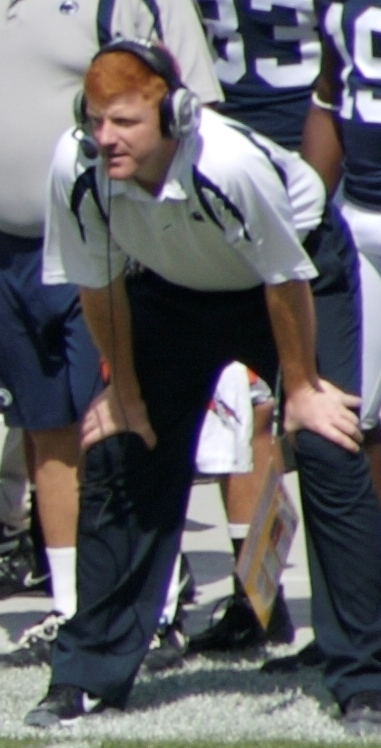
- McQueary in 2007

Biographical details
- Born: October 10, 1974 (age 52); Durham, North Carolina, U.S.
- Education: Penn State University

Playing career
- 1994–1997: Penn State
- Position: Quarterback

Coaching career (HC unless noted)
- 2000–2003: Penn State (assistant)
- 2004–2011: Penn State (WR/RC)

Michael Jacob McQueary (born October 10, 1974) is a former American football assistant coach for the Pennsylvania State University (Penn State) under head coach Joe Paterno until late in the 2011 football season. McQueary was identified as a key witness in the Penn State child sex abuse scandal.

== Playing career ==
After a high school career at State College Area High School, McQueary was a quarterback for Penn State from 1994 through 1997. He backed up Kerry Collins in 1994, and backed up Wally Richardson in 1995 and 1996. He started all 12 games as a senior in 1997, leading Penn State to a 9–3 record and a Citrus Bowl bid. In his first college start against Pittsburgh (on September 6), McQueary passed for a then-Penn State record 366 yards in a 34–17 victory over the Panthers. For the season, he completed 146 of 255 passes for 2211 yards and 17 touchdowns (both yards and touchdowns second in the Big Ten to Purdue's Billy Dicken), while tossing 9 interceptions.

== Coaching career ==
McQueary returned to Penn State in 2000 following attempts to catch on in the National Football League (NFL) with the Oakland Raiders and in NFL Europe with the Scottish Claymores. His roles on the football coaching staff included graduate assistant coach (2000–2002), administrative assistant (2003), and recruiting coordinator and receivers coach (2004–2011). As recruiting coordinator, McQueary oversaw the recruitment of several high-profile recruits including Justin King, Derrick Williams and Andrew Quarless.

On November 11, 2011, Penn State announced McQueary would not be serving as receivers coach in the final home game of the season due to threats against him, and put him on indefinite paid administrative leave. Later that day, The Patriot-News reported that McQueary told his receivers in a conference call that he would no longer be their coach.

McQueary later filed a lawsuit seeking up to $4 million in damages from the university for wrongful termination. The trial date was set for October 17, 2016, upon which it opened with testimony by a state prosecutor. The university's action, framed both as wrongful dismissal and for damages in defamation (libel and slander), was seen as such by a jury and McQueary was awarded $7.3 million, including compensatory and punitive damages, on October 27, 2016. Penn State filed an appeal on November 7, 2016, and on November 30, another almost $5 million was ordered payable to McQueary based on a separate charge that his firing was retaliation for whistleblowing. Penn State appealed the verdicts, and McQueary ended his lawsuit in November 2017, after reaching undisclosed settlement terms with the university.

== Role in sex abuse scandal ==
McQueary was identified as a key witness in the Penn State child sex abuse scandal. Grand jury testimony alleged McQueary reported to Paterno of witnessing Jerry Sandusky raping a 10-year-old boy in a campus locker room; McQueary first told his father about the incident, then the next day informed Paterno, and then ten days later informed other university officials. Journalist John Ziegler has questioned the case's reported dates and timelines, particularly the night of the incident being February 9, 2001, as there was a concert underway that evening.

According to investigators and legal experts, McQueary was initially not implicated in any wrongdoing because he reported the incident to Paterno. Under Pennsylvania state law of the time, any state employee who learns about an allegation of child abuse was required to report it to his or her immediate supervisor. In this case, McQueary did what he was legally obligated to do by reporting it to his immediate supervisor, Paterno. However, he was criticized for not intervening to protect the boy from Sandusky, as well as for not reporting the incident to police himself. McQueary later said he made sure the observed assault stopped before he left, and that he discussed the incident with police. However, McQueary's claim to have contacted police officials could not be corroborated by either university police or the State College police department.

The university senior vice president and others have been charged with perjury for saying that McQueary had reported only horseplay at the time. A prominent Pennsylvania nephrologist says that he was present when McQueary described the incident to his father and the description mentioned hearing but not seeing "rhythmic slapping sounds" in the other room, seeing Sandusky put his hand around the child's waist and later emerging wearing a towel. Mike McQueary's testimony for the preliminary perjury trial indicates that he heard 'two or three' slapping sounds before entering the locker room, and later saw Sandusky with his arms around the child's waist while hearing 'more than one' of the showerheads running and saw that the child's hair 'was wet'; although he did not see any sexual contact of hands or genitals or any evidence of arousal, just from the positions of the bodies he knew it was 'over the line' and 'extremely sexual' and 'some sort of intercourse' was taking place, and that he tried to explain what he had seen to Coach Paterno by using the word 'fondling.' Pennsylvania governor Tom Corbett, who as state attorney general opened the grand jury investigation, has said that McQueary "met the minimum obligation in reporting it up, but did not in my opinion meet a moral obligation that all of us would have." It has been speculated that he was still employed because he was protected by Pennsylvania's whistleblower law.

== Personal life ==
As of March 2014, he was separated from his wife Barbara, who was living in Virginia with their daughter, then four years old. McQueary has an older brother, John II. Their father, physician John Sr, has described theirs as "an unusually close family", having been close before the sex abuse scandal and more so after it became so well known.

In April 2017, McQueary was among several passersby who came to the aid of an elderly woman who was a victim of an automobile crash near Harrisburg, Pennsylvania.
