= Paul Plaschke =

Paul Albert Plaschke
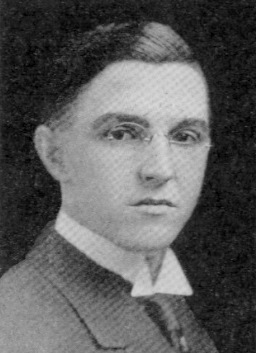
- Paul Albert Plaschke
- Born: February 2, 1880; Berlin, Germany
- Died: February 12, 1954 (aged 74); New Albany, Indiana, U.S.
- Education: Art Students League of New York under George Luks
- Known for: Editorial cartooning, Landscape painting
- Movement: Impressionism

Paul Albert Plaschke (February 2, 1880 – February 12, 1954) was a German-American artist recognized for his editorial cartooning and impressionist landscape painting.

== Biography ==
Born in Berlin, Germany, Plaschke immigrated to the United States in 1884 with his family and settled in Hoboken, New Jersey. He studied drawing at the Cooper Union Art School and painting at the Art Students League of New York under George Luks.

== Career ==
Plaschke's career as an editorial cartoonist began in the early 20th century, with his work featured in newspapers like the Louisville Courier-Journal and the Chicago Herald-Examiner. His cartoons, often featuring the character "Monk," were known for their pithy social commentary. Simultaneously, he pursued his passion for painting, developing a reputation as an Impressionist landscape artist and earning places at major American art exhibitions, such as the Hoosier Salon.

== Personal life and death ==
Plaschke married Ophelia Bennett in 1899 in Louisville, Kentucky. They had three sons. They eventually settled in nearby New Albany, Indiana.

Plaschke died on February 12, 1954, in New Albany and was interred in Cave Hill Cemetery. His contributions to art, both in cartooning and painting, have made him a notable figure in American art history.
