= Bearing Witness (2005 film) =

- Written by: Maryam d'Abo
- Directed by: Bob Eisenhardt; Barbara Kopple; Marijana Wotton
- Starring: Molly Bingham; Marie Colvin; Janine di Giovanni; Mary Rogers; May Ying Welsh
- Theme music composer: Joel Goodman
- Country of origin: United States
- Original language: English

Production
- Producer: Marijana Wotton
- Cinematography: Joan Churchill; Richard Connors; Luke Geissbuhler
- Editor: Bob Eisenhardt
- Running time: 90 minutes
- Production company: Cabin Creek Films

Original release
- Network: A&E Network
- Release: 2005

Bearing Witness is a 2005 documentary by Barbara Kopple and Marijana Wotton.

== Synopsis ==
It follows five women reporters and the challenges they face as they work in Iraq during the Second Gulf War. Molly Bingham is an experienced photographer who was held for several days at Abu Ghraib prison at the start of the war. Marie Colvin was a reporter who lost her eye to a grenade while working in Sri Lanka. Janine di Giovanni has to deal with the difficulties of becoming a mother and still working to fulfill her duties as a journalist. Mary Rogers is a camerawoman who continues to put herself in harm's way in an effort to get the proper footage to cover her stories.

== Production ==
Bearing Witness was made for and premiered on the A&E television network on May 26, 2005. The film was invited to open the 2005 Full Frame Documentary Film Festival in Durham, North Carolina, with the subject that year being on "Why War?".

== Reception ==
Alessandra Stanley of The New York Times was critical of the documentary, calling it a "beautifully shot feminist film with an oddly old-fashioned, Ladies Home Journal approach". Stanley was critical of the film boxing women into a sub-category of "women war correspondents" and the film's lack of focus on male and non-Western voices while also acknowledging the role that gender plays in their work.
