= Samuel C. Brightman =

American journalist (1911–1992)

Samuel C. Brightman (1911–1992) was a journalist, war correspondent, freelance writer and adult educator.

Brightman started his career with the Louisville (KY) Courier-Journal covering education and politics and eventually becoming their Washington correspondent. In 1939 he spent seven months travelling a Europe on the verge of war, writing a series of articles for the Courier-Journal (his last installment was written from Poland shortly before Hitler invaded).

He enlisted in the army in World War II and was assigned as a Public Relations Officer, responsible for transport, billeting, and general assistance for a group of newspaper reporters. He and his collection of reporters landed on Omaha Beach on D-Day with the American forces; Brightman's were the first reports to reach the U.S. after the landing, despite the fact that their equipment landed nearly a mile away and there was no reliable route for their stories. Brightman received a Bronze Star for his efforts.

After the war he took a position with the Democratic National Committee, an organization he remained with for nearly twenty years in various capacities including Deputy Director of Publicity, Director of Publicity, and managing editor of their monthly publication, The Democratic Digest, later called The Democrat. He was involved in several Democratic National Conventions in the 1950s and 1960s, generating publicity, press releases, and informational brochures for the party.

Throughout his career he wrote extensively—columns, newsletters, essays, and speeches—on health care, the perils of aging, politics and political humor and, in his later years, on the importance of education in a democratic society and on ways to encourage civic literacy in the general population. He was the founding editor of "Adult and Continuing Education Today" and the first journalist to become devoted fully to covering adult education.
