= Mary Walter (radio) =

American radio show host

- Born: New Jersey
- Education: Villanova University
- Awards: 2018 Gracie Award Honoree, 2020 Gracie Award Honoree
- Presenting career
- Show: "Mornings on the Mall"
- Station: WMAL-FM
- Network: Fox News Channel
- Time slot: 5-9am EST
- Show: "Mary Walter Show"
- Station: WHAS
- Time slot: 6-8pm EST
- Country: United States
- Website: marywalter.com

Mary Walter is an American radio show host, political commentator, and voiceover artist.

== Early ==
Mary Walter was born and raised in New Jersey. She graduated from Villanova University with a degree in communications.

== Career ==
Walter got her start in radio after winning a contest. She was listening to WKXW (NJ 101.5) out of Trenton, New Jersey when she heard they were holding a contest to determine who would "take over" the relationship show, "The Passion Phones". She called in "on a whim" and a week later had the job. She was there five years before being "summarily fired", three weeks after being congratulated on her ratings and being presented a performance bonus.

After collecting unemployment for "a couple of months", Walter was hired to host the morning show on WCTC (1450 AM) in New Brunswick, New Jersey, which she did for four years as “Mary in the Morning” — the first female anchor of a morning show in the state. She then joined a "short-lived" syndicated show. When WKXW sold, the new owners asked her to return as host of the relationship show. Walter did both shows for "a couple of months" until she "finally got tired of working for the syndicated show for free."

Walter was back at WKXW for five more years until they fired her again. From 2008 to 2014 she was a commentator on the Fox News Channel (television), and from 2006 she has guest hosted on Fox News Talk (radio) for Brian Kilmeade, John Gibson. and others. She is still guest hosting the Brian Kilmeade Show & the Guy Benson Show.

In 2013 Longport Media asked her to join their KOOL 98.3 team to redux her relationship show, this time rebranded as “Life! with Mary Walter”, which she hosted until June 2015. After guest hosting at WHAS for seven years, she applied for a full-time opening. They hired her as host of the “Mary Walter Show” on iHeartMedia’s 840AM WHAS out of Louisville, Kentucky. Kelly Carls, Director of AM Programming, iHeartMedia Louisville, commented: “We’ve had the pleasure of working with Mary as a fill-in host. She’s always prepared, keeps her finger on the pulse of the news, and does a great job connecting with our listeners. We’re delighted she’ll be offering her unique perspectives every day.”

WMAL-FM named Walter as the new co-host of its “Mornings on the Mall” in February 2017. She joined incumbent host Brian Wilson after Larry O'Connor moved from mornings to afternoons at the beginning of the year. Walter said of the move:

I am really excited about joining "Mornings on the Mall". Bill Hess has built WMAL into a powerhouse and this is an opportunity I just couldn’t pass up. I am honored to be working alongside Brian Wilson, and to be on the same station as Chris Plante and Larry O'Connor – it’s an incredible line-up!

Walter and co-host Vince Coglianese are known for their interviews with prominent figures in the news. Walter's favorites have been Carson Kressley and John Edward "on the entertainment side". "The audience LOVED them both," she remembers. "I was shocked to find out that Carson is crazy smart — I'm talking Mensa smart! And John is just the nicest, most down to earth guy." Political favorites "would have to be either Dr. Ben Carson or Vice President Pence. Both men were just so kind and sincere; I could have spoken to both of those men for hours," she says. Her comments on illegal immigration have been noted by Media Matters. She now says that former President Donald Trump is her favorite political interview.

Walter was "a little surprised" at the negative reaction the show received for having a regular woman co-host at first — after having guest-hosted on WMAL for years and always having got "a positive response from the audience".

What's interesting is that the majority of blowback comes from other women! Hearing a woman voice strong political opinions is just hard for some people. Talk radio audiences are used to hearing men, and when you bring a woman in to a role that has been held by a man for 50+ years on a station, you can expect a lot of whining and complaining.

She was a regular guest commentator on “The Sean Hannity Show” and “America Live with Megyn Kelly.”, "Red Eye" and other shows on the Fox News Channel from 2008 - 2014.

Walter had "a brief stint" on NewsMax TV in 2014 and is now back on the Channel as a regular commentator on the Chris Salcedo Show, the Wendy Bell Show and the Sean Spicer Show.

She also provides voice over services for a variety of clients.

Walter left the "Mornings on the Mall" co-hosting position on May 13, 2021 due to family considerations.

== Awards, honors, and distinctions ==
Walter was a 2018, 2020 & 2022 Gracie Award Honoree for Breaking News Coverage Large/Major Market, Co-host (Talk/Personality) Large/Major – Morning [Radio – Local] and Interview Feature in a Large/Major Market. Gracies are awarded by the Alliance for Women in Media Foundation to recognize and inspire women across the media industry.

In 2019 Walter helped WMAL-FM earn the honor of placing a trio of its show hosts in the Top 100 TALKERS Magazine "Heavy Hundred" awards along with Vince Coglianese, Larry O’Connor, and Chris Plante. Mary Walter and Vince Coglianese were ranked 54th in The Talkers Magazine 2020 Heavy Hundred as a team broadcasting from WMAL-FM.
