= Adele Brandeis =

American art historian (1885–1975)

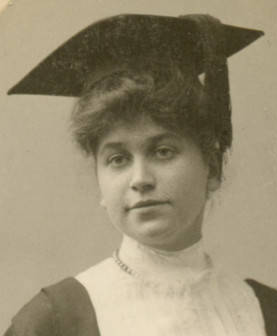
- Brandeis in 1904
- Born: 1885
- Died: 1975 (aged 89–90); Louisville, Kentucky, U.S.
- Occupations: Art administrator, writer
- Employer: Louisville Courier-Journal
- Organization(s): Federal Art Project, Section of Painting and Sculpture
- Parent(s): Alfred Brandeis, Jennie Taussig
- Relatives: Uncle, Louis D. Brandeis

Adele Brandeis (1885–1975) was an American art administrator from Louisville, Kentucky.

== Work ==
In 1911, Brandeis presented a paper on "The Development of Art in Cincinnati" to the Women's Club of Louisville, where she highlighted the crucial role women had played in promoting art in Cincinnati. She encouraged her listeners to work toward the establishment of an art museum and art school in Louisville, which would then lead to greater development of the arts in Louisville.

During the Great Depression of the 1930s, Brandeis worked for the WPA Federal Art Project and the Section of Painting and Sculpture. Brandeis did art research for the Index of American Design, a comprehensive collection of American material culture, and managed the creation of visual artwork by local artists. Brandeis focused on ensuring that Shaker art in Kentucky was recorded in the Index of American Design. She knew that the Shaker community near Harrodsburg was closed, and that furniture and other items were being auctioned off. In order to keep a record of the Shaker's furniture, weaving, clothing, and other work, Brandeis arranged for four artists to lodge in Harrodsburg and document the surviving Shaker arts for the Index. The materials in the Index informed the later reconstruction of Shakertown.

Brandeis lectured on art at the University of Louisville in the 1930s, for the Art Association in Louisville, and became a member of the first Arts Center Association Board in Louisville in 1942. She wrote for the Louisville Courier-Journal starting in 1945. Among other jobs, she did research for the editorial page. She was the first woman to be nominated to the board of trustees of the University of Louisville in 1949 and served various Kentucky art organizations.

== Life ==
Brandeis was the daughter of Alfred Brandeis, who was the brother of United States Supreme Court Justice Louis D. Brandeis, and Jennie Taussig. She died at Mount Holly Nursing Home on June 1, 1975, at 89 years old.
