= Meeting Resistance =

- Theatrical release poster
- Directed by: Molly Bingham; Steve Connors
- Written by: Molly Bingham; Steve Connors
- Distributed by: Nine Lives Documentary Productions
- Release date: October 2007
- Running time: 84 minutes
- Country: United States
- Languages: Arabic, English

Meeting Resistance is a 2007 documentary film about the Iraq War. The film presents the views of eleven Iraqi resistance fighters in the Adhamiyah neighborhood of Baghdad. The film was directed by journalists Molly Bingham (United States) and Steve Connors (UK).

The interviewees are all anonymous and (with one exception) faceless or out-of-focus on camera. They are presented as nicknames: The Teacher, The Warrior, The Traveler, The Imam, The Wife, The Syrian, The Fugitive, The Local, The Republican Guard, The Lieutenant, and The Professor.

The US military currently organizes showings for its forces in Iraq so they can know who they are fighting.

== See also ==
- BattleGround: 21 Days on the Empire's Edge
