= John Ziegler (journalist) =

American television host and conservative journalist

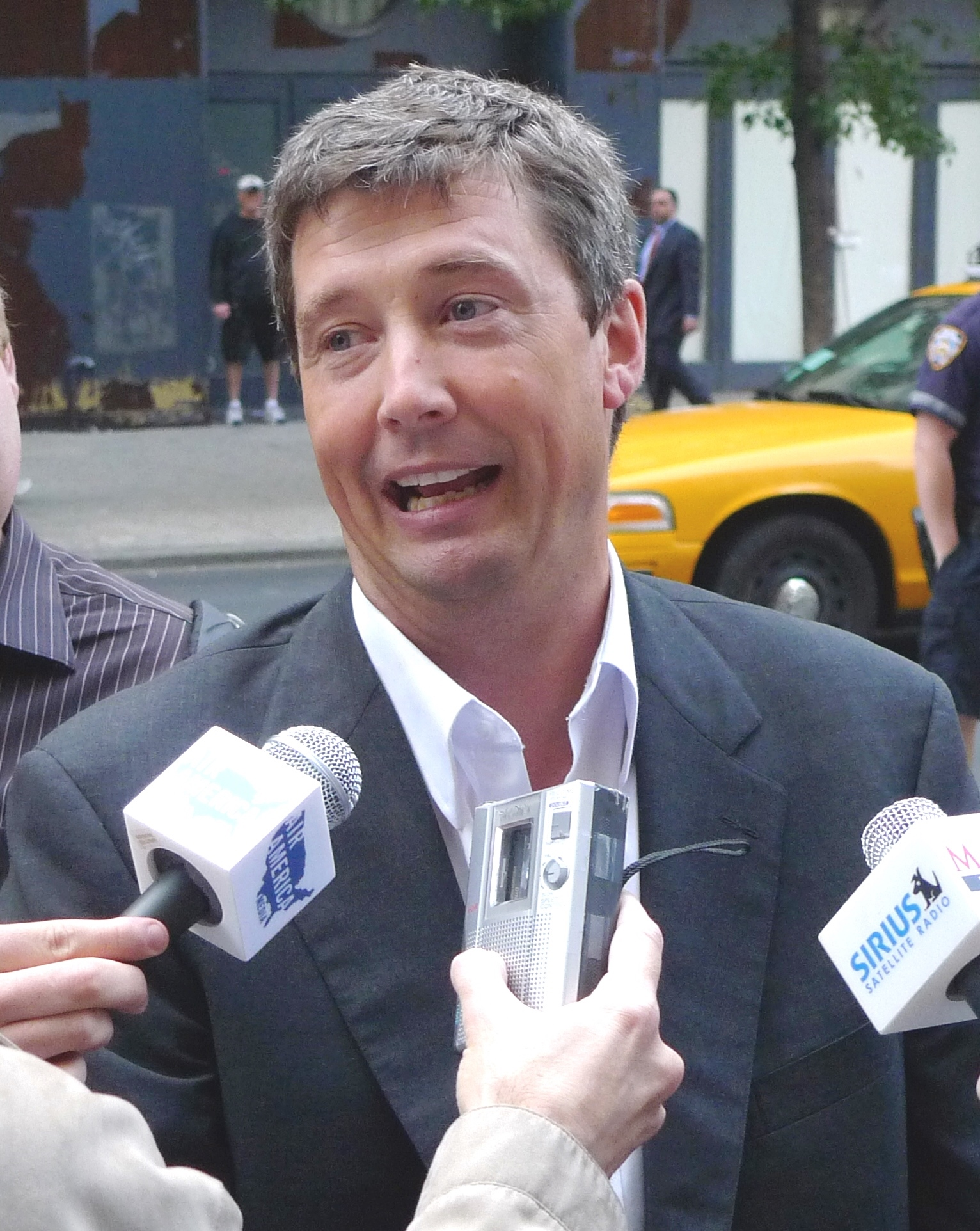
- John Ziegler at a demonstration in New York City, June 2009
- Born: March 28, 1967 (age 59); Heidelberg, West Germany
- Education: Georgetown University (BA)
- Occupation: Broadcaster

John Ziegler (born March 28, 1967) is a former radio program host, documentary film writer/director, and conservative journalist.

He was the evening (7–10 PM) host of a radio talk show called The John Ziegler Show on KFI AM 640 in Los Angeles, California, from 2004 to 2007. He has also hosted a Sunday evening radio program, the John and Leah Show. He is a former staff columnist for Mediaite.

== Early life and education ==
Ziegler was born in a U.S. Army post in Heidelberg, Germany, and grew up as the eldest son of a financial manager in the small village of Washington Crossing, Bucks County, Pennsylvania. He was named High School Golfer of the Year by the Bucks County Courier Times. In 1985, Ziegler graduated from the Catholic Holy Ghost Preparatory School located in Bensalem, Pennsylvania. He attended Georgetown University, graduating in 1989 with a degree in Government and a minor in Theology and Philosophy. While attending Georgetown, he lettered in golf for three years.

Ziegler has stated that he "grew up in an incredibly, very strict Roman Catholic family on both sides, my mother and my father's side. I've got numerous aunts who've been in the convent. I went to Catholic high school, Catholic college, as did almost all of my relatives, so, I mean, I'm very steeped in Catholicism". Ziegler is, however, an agnostic, referring to himself as a "recovering Catholic".

== Career ==
After graduating from college, Ziegler became a sportscaster, moving his way up to a full-time position at WTOV in Ohio. He left the position to write a book about high school football in Steubenville, Ohio, called Dynasty of the Crossroads. After the book, he took a position as a sportscaster at WRAZ in Raleigh, North Carolina, but was fired in 1995 after making what he describes as an "incredibly tame" joke about his belief that O. J. Simpson was guilty.

He worked at various stations before ending up at WWTN in Nashville, Tennessee, where he was fired after having said the word "nigger" on the air. Ziegler has explained this event as him referencing what the boxer Mike Tyson said at a press conference, where Tyson referred to himself using that word. He then began writing columns for The Philadelphia Inquirer and Philadelphia Daily News and co-hosted a talk show on Comcast's CN8 Television Network, which later resulted in his winning a regional Emmy.

In 2002, wanting to return to radio, Ziegler was hired by Louisville, Kentucky, radio station WHAS. Once again, his tenure did not last long, as during a Ask John Anything segment, he discussed Darcie Divita, a former Los Angeles Lakers cheerleader and WDRB morning television host with whom Ziegler had a relationship until Divita broke up with him.

In 2003, while still employed by WHAS, he joined forces with Louisville Democrat and former 3rd district Congressional Representative John Yarmuth to debate political issues on the weekly WAVE program Yarmuth & Ziegler, with Yarmuth taking the progressive side and Ziegler the conservative side. This gig lasted through November of that year. In 2006, Ziegler supported the Yarmuth election campaign for Kentucky's 3rd congressional district, both financially and as a political adviser. Yarmuth won the election to Congress, defeating his incumbent Republican opponent Anne Northup.

On January 12, 2004, Ziegler began work at KFI as a late evening host. As both WHAS and KFI are owned by Clear Channel, this placed him in the unusual situation of having been fired and re-hired by the same company within a short time frame. He moved to the 7-10 p.m. slot on February 21, 2005. In November 2007, he left KFI.

== The John Ziegler Show ==
=== KFI AM 640 ===
John Ziegler was the evening (7-10 PM) host of a radio talk show called The John Ziegler Show on KFI AM 640 in Los Angeles, California from January 12, 2004, until November 13, 2007.

The program was mostly news-based political commentary, but it also brought up other issues such as events happening in Ziegler's personal life. The John Ziegler Show was advertised as Getting it Right at Night and a common catchphrase that Ziegler used to describe the show was "three hours of rationality in a world of ever increasing insanity".

Ziegler was suspended for two days in 2006 following an on-air confrontation with John Kobylt of KFI's John and Ken Show. On November 13, 2007, the day after he announced his departure from KFI, Ziegler broadcast his last show. He told a reporter that the decision was due to mental and physical exhaustion, and to his work on a documentary.

=== KGIL 1260 AM ===
In June 2009, Ziegler began a show on Los Angeles news/talk radio station KGIL 1260 AM, which ran from 11 AM until 1 PM. weekdays.

=== Nationally syndicated program ===
Beginning November 2, 2014, Ziegler rejoined Brandon to host the John and Leah Show on KHTS in Santa Clarita, California. In March 2015, the program became nationally syndicated through Envision Networks, with 24 stations nationwide doing business under the name Free Speech Broadcasting Network. The program moved its home base to KRLA in Los Angeles in August 2015. John and Leah was named as one of the 100 most influential radio talk shows in the United States by Talkers Magazine in 2016, coming in at #99. Leah Brandon left the show in November 2016.

== Documentaries ==
After leaving his talk show on KFI AM 640, Ziegler was involved in two documentary film projects. In August 2008, John Ziegler and producer David Bossie of Citizens United premiered a documentary co-produced, written and directed by Ziegler entitled Blocking The Path to 9/11, which revisits the political controversy about the ABC docudrama miniseries The Path to 9/11. Through interviews with the Path to 9/11 filmmakers and others, news clips about the controversy, and footage from the miniseries, the documentary makes the claim that Disney/ABC ultimately shelved plans to release a DVD of the miniseries as a result of pressure from the political left, specifically the Clintons. As noted in the documentary, Disney/ABC denies this and claims the move was merely a business decision. But commission member Richard Ben-Veniste said that the miniseries misrepresented facts presented in the 9/11 Commission report. Two FBI agents also criticized the film's accuracy. Thomas E. Nicoletti was hired by the filmmakers as a consultant, but quit, saying "There were so many inaccuracies...I'm well aware of what's dramatic license and what's historical inaccuracy," Nicoletti said. "And this had a lot of historical inaccuracy.'"

Shortly after the 2008 U.S. presidential election, Ziegler announced that a documentary titled Media Malpractice: How Obama Got Elected was in production (the full title was later changed to Media Malpractice: How Obama Got Elected And Palin Was Targeted). The film claims that a liberal bias in the media was responsible for Barack Obama being elected president. The film was originally released live on the Today Show on February 23, 2009.

=== Jerry Sandusky child sex abuse scandal documentary ===
Ziegler released a 32-minute "mini-documentary" on the Penn State child sex abuse scandal, criticizing media accounts that Joe Paterno was aware of Jerry Sandusky's abuse of children. The documentary interviews former Penn State players Franco Harris and Christian Marrone, as well as Sandusky's attorney Joe Amendola and Penn State trustee Anthony Lubrano. They argue that Paterno was not fully informed of Mike McQueary's allegations and thus could not have "covered up" the abuse.

Ziegler interviewed Sandusky from prison and debuted some of that interview live on the Today Show on March 25, 2013. Ziegler steadfastly maintains that Sandusky was a "chaste pedophile" and committed no sexual acts with his victims. Ziegler, who initially said he believed Sandusky was guilty of the crimes he was accused of, now believes that Sandusky is innocent. Ziegler's prison interview with Sandusky came under fire by the Paterno family. Paterno family attorney Wick Sollers released a statement, describing it as "transparently self-serving and yet another insult to the victims and anyone who cares about the truth in this tragic story"

== Mediaite column ==
Ziegler worked as a columnist at Mediaite starting in 2016 and has not published an article on the site since November 8, 2021.

The last of Ziegler's Mediate articles, published on that date, criticized the media in the Jerry Sandusky child molestation and child rape case and trial. Declaring "the media got this story catastrophically wrong and that those convicted at Penn State, including Sandusky himself, should not have been".
