= BattleGround: 21 Days on the Empire's Edge =

- Directed by: Stephen Marshall
- Produced by: Lisa Kawamoto Hsu; Anthony Lappé; Jeff Hull executive producer Ian Inaba executive producer Bob Jason executive producer Robert Kravitz executive producer Joshua Shore executive producer Stephen Marshall executive producer
- Starring: Sgt. Robert Hollis; Rana al Aiouby; Farhan al Bayati; Hesham Barbary; Raed Jarrar; Col. Fred Rudesheim; Lt. Col. Nate Sassaman; May Ying Welsh
- Cinematography: Stephen Marshall
- Edited by: Leo Cullen; Stephen Marshall
- Music by: Soulsavers
- Distributed by: Guerrilla News Network; Artists/Media Cooperation (Co.Op)
- Release date: October 14, 2004
- Running time: 82 minutes
- Country: United States
- Language: English

BattleGround: 21 Days on the Empire's Edge was released in 2004, and received the Silver Hugo Award for documentaries at the 2004 Chicago International Film Festival. It aired on Showtime and was released on DVD by Home Vision. The film follows the story of Frank al-Bayati, a former Shiite guerrilla traveling back to Iraq for the first time since the 1991 uprising against Saddam Hussein. Al-Bayati was wounded, captured, tortured and then escaped. He spent more than a year in a Saudi Arabian refugee camp before being repatriated to the U.S. Lappé and Marshall follow al-Bayati as he tracks down his family members and capture the emotional reunions. Al-Bayati's optimism for what he calls "liberated Iraq" is countered by the reality the filmmakers find on the ground. A growing insurgency is creating more enemies than it is killing. With candid interviews with top American commanders, the filmmakers capture the U.S. military's inability to grasp the nature of their enemy. In addition, Lappé and Marshall bring a Geiger counter and conduct their own radiation tests on Iraqi armor that has been hit by American shells. They find evidence of the use of depleted uranium, the controversial radioactive metal used in some American munitions.

The film was directed by Stephen Marshall, and produced by Anthony Lappé and Lisa Hsu.

== Cast ==
- Robert Hollis as Self (as Sgt. Robert Hollis)
- Rana al Aiouby as Self
- Farhan al Bayati as Self
- Hesham Barbary as Self
- Raed Jarrar as Self
- Fred Rudesheim as Self (as Col. Fred Rudesheim)
- Nate Sassaman as Self (as Lt. Col. Nate Sassaman)
- May Ying Welsh as Self

== See also ==
- Meeting Resistance
