= Janine di Giovanni =

American journalist

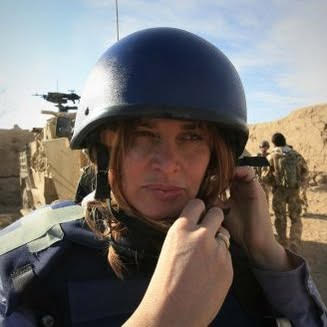
- Di Giovanni in Helmand Province, Afghanistan in 2010 (photo by Pete Nicholls)
- Born: New Jersey, United States
- Education: University of Maine (BA); University of London (MA); University of Iowa (MFA); Tufts University (MA)
- Occupations: Academic, war correspondent, human rights defender
- Title: Executive Director, The Reckoning Project; Senior Fellow, Yale University Jackson School of Global Affairs
- Spouse(s): Marc Schlossman (m. 1986; div. 1995) Bruno Girodon (m. 2003; sep. 2008)
- Children: Luca Costantino Girodon
- Website: www.janinedigiovanni.com

Janine di Giovanni is an American author, journalist, and war correspondent currently serving as the executive director of The Reckoning Project, a war crimes documentation organization. She is a senior fellow at Yale University's Jackson School of Global Affairs, a life member of the Council on Foreign Relations, and a recipient of the 2019 Guggenheim Fellowship.

Over a 35-year career, di Giovanni has covered major conflicts including the Siege of Sarajevo, Rwandan genocide, Kosovo War, conflicts in Chechnya, Afghanistan, Iraq War, Somalia, South Sudan, Sierra Leone, Ivory Coast, Zimbabwe, Libya, Yemen, Lebanon, Israel/Palestine, Ukraine and the Syrian civil war. She is a "human rights reporter" with a focus on war crimes and crimes against humanity. In 2016, she was awarded the prestigious Courage Award from the International Women's Media Foundation for her lifetime body of work. In 2020, the American Academy of Arts and Letters awarded her the Blake-Dodd Prize for her lifetime body of work in non-fiction.

== Early life and education ==
Di Giovanni is the seventh child in an Italian-American family from New Jersey. Her father emigrated from Naples to complete his studies, while her mother was a third-generation Italian-American from a prominent political and medical family in Newark, New Jersey. She is a cousin of the late Democratic congressman Peter W. Rodino, who oversaw the impeachment process against Richard Nixon in 1974.

Di Giovanni grew up in Caldwell, New Jersey.

Originally aspiring to become a humanitarian doctor in Africa, di Giovanni instead pursued an academic career. She attended the University of Maine, where she majored in English, and later earned an MA in European Languages and Literature from the University of London, where her thesis, on Chekhov, was supervised by Dr. Donald Rayfield. She was admitted to the prestigious Iowa Writers' Workshop, where she studied fiction under editor Rust Hills and poet Joy Williams alongside contemporaries including Suketu Mehta and Colin Harrison. She later completed an MA from the Fletcher School of Law and Diplomacy at Tufts University, focusing on international law and mediation with a thesis on Track Two Diplomacy.

== Career ==
=== Early journalism (1987–1992) ===
Di Giovanni's transition from fiction writing to journalism occurred in 1989 when she met Felicia Langer, an Israeli Jewish lawyer and Holocaust survivor who defended Palestinians in military courts in Jerusalem. Langer sent di Giovanni to the West Bank and Gaza Strip with a list of contacts, including Palestinian lawyer Raji Sourani, founder of the Palestinian Center for Human Rights, and Dr. Eyad al-Saraj, founder of the Gaza Community Mental Health Program.

Di Giovanni began covering the First Intifada and Nicaragua in 1989 for the London Times and The Spectator. After three years documenting the intifada, she published her first book, Against the Stranger: Lives in Occupied Territory (1993), which examined the emotional and psychological impacts on both Palestinians and Israelis, blending sociopolitical analysis with ground-level reporting.

=== Bosnia and the Balkans (1992–1999) ===
In 1991, while working for The Spectator and The Sunday Times, di Giovanni was mentored by legendary Scottish editor Andrew Neil, who sent her to Sarajevo against the wishes of the Foreign Editor, whom di Giovanni would later claim was misogynistic. She arrived in autumn 1992 "with a satellite phone, cash and some protein bars" and remained in Bosnia for most of the conflict.

During the Siege of Sarajevo, di Giovanni reported from frontline battles including the Battle of Žuc, traveled throughout Central, Northern, and Western Bosnia, and in summer 1993 breached the siege of the East Bank of Mostar to report on the starving population. Her coverage of the Srebrenica massacre and advocacy for international intervention earned recognition for extreme bravery and courage in battle. She published two books about her Balkan experiences: The Quick and the Dead: Under Siege in Sarajevo (1994) and Madness Visible: A Memoir of War (2004), the latter described by critics as "extraordinarily brave war correspondence."

Di Giovanni has often quoted war correspondent Martha Gellhorn's sentiment: "You can only love one war. The rest is responsibility," describing how she and fellow journalists "fell in love" with the Sarajevo conflict in a "gruesome and horrible" but profoundly intense way, while subsequent wars became matters of duty.

=== Global conflicts (1994–2001) ===
In 1994, di Giovanni was sent to Rwanda during the genocide. In her 2010 TED Talk "What I Saw in the War," she reflected on witnessing "miles and miles" of bodies "melting in the sun." She described the genocide's brutality, noting that "a million people being slaughtered in three months... was labor-intensive killing" carried out with machetes rather than firearms, highlighting the intense and personal nature of the violence.

During the 78-day Kosovo War, di Giovanni was embedded with the Kosovo Liberation Army front lines for The Times, The New York Times, and Vanity Fair. Early in the war, she was kidnapped along with two French reporters by drunken Serb paramilitaries on a snowy mountain pass between Montenegro and Kosovo. The paramilitaries stole their equipment and made them kneel in the forest with hands behind their backs while shooting over their heads before releasing them. One refugee witness later told her: "We saw them march you off. We saw them take you at gunpoint. You were very lucky. God was with you."

While embedded with a Kosovo unit, she and Magnum Photos photographer Alex Majoli were accidentally bombed by a NATO fighter jet that mistook their position for a Serbian one. She was trapped in a frontline trench for "two nights, have slept in ditches, days on a muddy slope, covered in soldier's excrement," and later helped administer first aid and load the dead into trucks. Her article "Madness Visible" about this incident won the 1999 National Magazine Award and established her as a contributing editor to Vanity Fair.

In January 2000, di Giovanni traveled to Chechnya, which was closed to Western journalists without Russian military permission. She crossed on foot from Ingushetia, arriving a week before Grozny fell to Russian forces. She was one of only three Western journalists to witness the fall of the city. Her depiction of the terror after the fall won her several media awards, including the Amnesty International Prize and Britain's Foreign Correspondent of the Year, and resulted in her being banned from entering Russia.

=== Post-9/11 wars (2001–2013) ===
Following the September 11 attacks, di Giovanni reported extensively on what she termed "Post-9/11 wars," beginning to research crimes committed by Al-Qaeda. She crossed into Taliban-held northern Afghanistan on a raft from Tajikistan, followed the Northern Alliance into Kabul, and was present at Tora Bora during the hunt for Osama bin Laden. She remained in Afghanistan for several months before being sent to Iraq to prepare for the US invasion.

She opened The Times of London bureau in Baghdad and remained to report on civilian life during the run-up to the Iraq War. Before the invasion, she received a rare pass to travel the length of Iraq from Basra to Kurdistan for National Geographic. During this period, she was featured alongside the late war reporter Marie Colvin in Barbara Kopple's documentary Bearing Witness.

She also reported on child soldiers from Liberia and Sierra Leone, where in May 2000 she was covering Médecins Sans Frontières' work with amputated children, victims of Revolutionary United Front militias. Her reporting from Sierra Leone during this period, including "Dark Days in Sierra Leone" for The Times of London, won the 2001 Amnesty International Award for News Reporting. When fighting broke out, she fled to the abandoned residence of President Ahmad Tejan Kabbah, where she took documents linking UN peacekeepers and other high-level officials to the blood diamond trade. She later gave the documents to British officer Brigadier David Richards (later General Sir David Richards) who submitted them to the special tribunal for Rwanda.

=== Middle East Editor and Syria (2013–2018) ===
In 2013, di Giovanni joined Newsweek as Middle East Editor, covering the Arab Spring beginning in Tunisia, then Egypt, Libya, Yemen, and Syria. She also reported from South Sudan on post-conflict resolution and from Yemen on child marriages in collaboration with UNICEF. That year, di Giovanni was named one of the 100 most influential people in the world reducing armed violence by the organization Action on Armed Violence.

Her Syria coverage proved particularly significant. Initially reporting from the Bashar al-Assad regime side for The New York Times, Newsweek, Granta, and Vanity Fair, she was denied further visas following her report in The Guardian on the Daraya massacre in August 2012. She then worked from the opposition side, entering illegally from Turkey to collect testimonies from torture victims, largely in Aleppo and to report on the destruction and attacks on hospitals. Her film "Seven Days in Syria," directed by Robert Rippberger, documented this work. Her colleague and friend, Steven Sotloff, was subsequently kidnapped by militants of the Islamic State and executed in the Syrian desert in September 2014.

Her book The Morning They Came for Us: Dispatches from Syria (2016) focused on individual civilian stories affected by state terror and was translated into over 20 languages. Michiko Kakutani of The New York Times wrote: "Ms. Di Giovanni writes here with urgency and anguish—determined to testify to what she has witnessed because she wants people never to forget." Turkish novelist Elif Shafak praised it for revealing "human stories behind the news... with heartbreaking eloquence."

The book won the Hay Festival's Nonfiction Prize, was shortlisted for the Helen Bernstein Prize at the New York Public Library, and was named a New York Post book of the year in 2016. Di Giovanni was awarded the International Women's Media Foundation "Courage in Journalism" Award in 2016 for her lifetime body of work.

=== Christian persecution and academic career (2014–2022) ===
Starting with the fall of Mosul to ISIS in 2014, di Giovanni reported extensively from the Nineveh Plains in Iraq and throughout the Middle East on the erosion of Christianity under ISIS and other extremist regimes. This work culminated in The Vanishing: Faith, Loss and the Twilight of Christianity in the Land of the Prophets (2021), which was personally presented to Pope Francis and shortlisted for the Moore Prize for Human Rights. Salman Rushdie praised it as "a tragic portrait of a disappearing world, created with all of the great Janine di Giovanni's passion and literary grace."

In 2017, di Giovanni became the Edward R. Murrow Fellow at the Council on Foreign Relations, focusing on ISIS-related crimes against Christians in Iraq. The following year, she was recruited by Yale's Jackson School of Global Affairs to teach human rights and conflict analysis until 2022, when she left to focus on The Reckoning Project.

=== The Reckoning Project (2022–present) ===
In February 2022, days after Russia's full-scale invasion of Ukraine, di Giovanni co-founded The Reckoning Project with British academic Peter Pomerantsev, initially funded by the U.S. government and later by the Howard G. Buffett Foundation. Based on her previous work with the United Nations Democracy Fund project "Enabling Witnesses," the organization trains Ukrainian investigative reporters to identify war crimes and collect legally admissible witness testimonies.

In three years, under di Giovanni's leadership, the organization tripled its budget and grew to 30 staff members, including human rights researchers, a legal team of four lawyers, investigators, and data scientists. In 2024, they launched a universal jurisdiction torture case in Argentina, bringing a Ukrainian witness to testify. The Board includes human rights luminaries such as former Human Rights Watch director, Kenneth Roth, and former Assistant Secretary General for Human Rights at the United Nations, Andrew Gilmour, as well as advisory board members such as Nobel Laureate Oleksandra Matviichuk, and Ukraine experts like Timothy Snyder, Serhiy Plokhy, and Philippe Sands.

The team has compiled numerous UN submissions and produced groundbreaking research based on di Giovanni's thesis that Vladimir Putin's wars in Chechnya, Syria, and Ukraine follow similar patterns of targeting civilians, particularly attacks on hospitals.

The project maintains over 600 testimonies in its archives and works directly within the office of the Prosecutor General of Ukraine while contributing to international justice mechanisms.

== Awards and recognition ==
- National Magazine Award (2000), for "Madness Visible"
- Amnesty International Award (2000, 2001), for reporting on Bosnia and Sierra Leone
- What the Papers Say Foreign Correspondent of the Year (Granada Television, UK), for reporting on Chechnya
- Courage in Journalism Award (2016)
- Hay Festival Medal for Prose (2016), for The Morning They Came for Us
- Guggenheim Fellowship (2019)
- Blake-Dodd Prize, American Academy of Arts and Letters (2020), for lifetime achievement in non-fiction
- Moore Prize for Human Rights Reporting
- International Impact Award — University of Iowa (2017)
- Helen Bernstein Book Award for Excellence in Journalism (shortlist, 2017)
- Edward R. Murrow Press Fellowship — Council on Foreign Relations (2016–17)
- Ida Beam Distinguished Professor — Iowa Writers’ Workshop (2016)
- Pakis Fellow — Fletcher School of Law and Diplomacy, Tufts University (2015–16)
- Named one of 100 Influential People Reducing Armed Violence — Action on Armed Violence (2013)
- The Nation Investigation Fund — two-time recipient (2012, 2013)
- Spears Memoir of the Year for Ghosts by Daylight — Spear’s Magazine (2011)
- President of the jury, Prix Bayeux-Calvados Awards for War Correspondents (2010)
- Stillwater Alumni Award — University of Maine (2008)
- Headliner Award for Excellence in Journalism (reporting on Syria) — National Headliner Awards (2016)

== Personal life ==
Di Giovanni has been married twice. Her first husband was photographer Marc Schlossman. The couple married in a New Jersey Roman Catholic church in 1986; they divorced in 1995. While based in Sarajevo, di Giovanni met French journalist Bruno Girodon; the couple married in August 2003 in St.-Guillaume, France in a civil ceremony, but separated in 2008. Her book, Ghosts by Daylight: A Memoir of War, published in 2010, chronicles their wartime love story and consequent struggles with trauma and war-time damage.

She is the mother of Luca Costantino Girodon, born in Paris in 2004. Motherhood significantly influenced her approach to risk-taking in conflict zones, shifting from being in extreme danger in battle to more calculated risk assessments. She began to report stories such as AIDS in India and abandoned children post-Tsunami as well as consulting for the United Nations and other NGOs.

Di Giovanni has described experiencing severe PTSD symptoms from her decades of war correspondence and the difficulty of returning to ordinary life between assignments. She has been vocal about the personal costs of conflict journalism, including surviving kidnapping, mock execution, death threats, and bombing raids that killed colleagues around her.

She returns to Yale in autumn 2025 to resume teaching Human Rights while continuing her work with The Reckoning Project, which expands operations to Darfur, Syria and Gaza.

== Publications ==
- Against the Stranger: Lives in Occupied Territory. Viking, 1993. ISBN 978-0670842803.
- The Quick and the Dead: Under Siege in Sarajevo. Phoenix, 1995. ISBN 978-1857993332.
- Madness Visible: A Memoir of War. Bloomsbury and Knopf, 2004. ISBN 0375724559.
- The Place at the End of the World. London: Bloomsbury, 2006. ISBN 978-0-7475-8036-2.
- Ghosts by Daylight. Bloomsbury and Knopf, 2011. ISBN 978-1-4088-2051-3.
- Eve Arnold: Magnum Legacy. Prestel, 2015. ISBN 978-3791349633.
- The Morning They Came for Us: Dispatches from Syria. Liveright, 2016. ISBN 978-0871407139.
- The Vanishing: Faith, Loss, and the Twilight of Christianity in the Land of the Prophets. PublicAffairs, 2021. ISBN 978-1541756717.

== Filmography ==
=== Documentaries made by di Giovanni ===
- Lessons from History (2000, BBC)
- Dead Men Tell No Tales (2001, BBC)

=== Documentary films featuring di Giovanni ===
- No Man's Land (1993) – Canadian filmmaker Shelley Saywell followed di Giovanni in Sarajevo to make this film about her life as a war correspondent, also featuring BBC journalist Lyse Doucet
- Bearing Witness (2005) – a television film by Barbara Kopple and Marijana Wotton featuring di Giovanni alongside the late war reporter Marie Colvin
- 7 Days in Syria (2015) – documentary film directed/produced by Robert Rippberger, co-produced by and co-starring di Giovanni. The film had a screening at the House of Lords

== Media appearances and lectures ==
Di Giovanni has been a frequent commentator and speaker on international affairs and war correspondence:

- Regular analysis on CNN, BBC, and NPR
- TED Talk: "What I Saw in the War" (2010) – has over 1 million views
- President of the Jury of the Bayeux-Calvados Awards for war correspondents (2010)
- Featured in The Paris Review's "Art of War Reporting" interview (2016)
- Multiple NPR appearances including TED Radio Hour coverage of courage in conflict zones
- Speaking engagements at major universities and journalism festivals worldwide
- Delegate to British Foreign Secretary William Hague's Global Summit on Sexual Violence (2015)
- Delegate to the World Economic Forum (2012, 2023)
- Delegate to the Munich Security Conference (2024, 2025)

== Academic positions and fellowships ==
- Non-resident Fellow in International Security at New America in Washington, D.C.
- Associate Fellow at the Geneva Centre for Security Policy in Switzerland
- Non Resident Fellow, New America Foundation
- Edward R. Murrow Press Fellow at the Council on Foreign Relations (2017–2018)
- Adjunct Professor of International and Public Affairs at the School of International and Public Affairs at Columbia University (2018)
- Senior Fellow at Yale University Jackson School of Global Affairs (2018–2022, returning 2025)
- Tom and Andi Bernstein Visiting Fellow for Human Rights at Yale Law School (2025–present)
- Guggenheim Fellow (2019)

== Professional associations ==
- Life member of the Council on Foreign Relations
- Board member of the Institute for War and Peace Reporting
- Board member of the Association of Foreign Press Correspondents
- Contributing editor to Vanity Fair (1999–present) and Foreign Affairs
- Regular columnist for Foreign Policy Magazine and The National (Abu Dhabi)

== Anthology and collection contributions ==
Janine di Giovanni's work has been widely anthologized in literary magazines, journalism collections, and travel writing series. The following is a verified, chronological list of her contributions to anthologies and edited collections:

- Zlata's Diary: A Child's Life in Sarajevo (1994). Author: Zlata Filipović; Translator: Christina Pribichevich-Zorić; Publisher: Viking/Penguin Books. Contribution: Introduction by Janine di Giovanni. ISBN 978-0140240092.
- The Best American Magazine Writing 2000 (2000). Editor: American Society of Magazine Editors; Publisher: Public Affairs. Contribution: "Madness Visible" (originally published in Vanity Fair, June 1999). ISBN 978-1586480097.
- Moments in Hell: Notes of a War Correspondent (2007). Author: Richard Harding Davis; Publisher: Anthem Travel Classics. Contribution: Editor/contributor for this republished edition.
- Granta 111: Going Back (2010). Editor: John Freeman; Publisher: Granta Publications. Contribution: "The Book of the Dead" (memoir).
- Granta 116: Ten Years Later (2011). Publisher: Granta Publications. Contribution: "In a Land of Silence" (essay).
- Paris Was Ours: Thirty-Two Writers Reflect on the City of Light (2011). Editor: Penelope Rowlands; Publisher: Algonquin Books. Contribution: "Parenting, French Style". ISBN 9781565129535.
- Ox Travels: Meetings of Remarkable Travel Writers (2011). Editors: Mark Ellingham, Peter Florence, Barnaby Rogerson; Publisher: Profile Books. Contribution: "Decide to be Bold".
- Granta 112: Pakistan (2012). Publisher: Granta Publications. Contribution: Introduction to Monika Bulaj's photographic essay.
- Granta 122: Betrayal (2013). Publisher: Granta/Grove Press. Contribution: Essay contribution to themed issue.
- The Best American Travel Writing 2014 (2014). Guest Editor: Paul Theroux; Series Editor: Jason Wilson; Publisher: Houghton Mifflin Harcourt. Contribution: "Life During Wartime" (originally published in Harper's Magazine, April 2013). ISBN 9780544330153.
- The Best American Nonrequired Reading 2014 (2014). Editor: Daniel Handler; Publisher: Mariner Books. Contribution: "Seven Days in Syria".
- Granta 145: Ghosts (2018). Editor: Sigrid Rausing; Publisher: Granta Publications. Contribution: Photography introduction for Monika Bulaj's photographs.
- My Country: A Syrian Memoir (2018). Author: Kassem Eid; Publisher: Bloomsbury Publishing. Contribution: Foreword by Janine di Giovanni. ISBN 9781408895092 (UK), 9781635572841 (US).
- Granta 152: Still Life (2020). Editor: Sigrid Rausing; Publisher: Granta Publications. Contribution: "Le Flottement" (essay).

== Critical reception and influence ==
The New York Times reviewer Michiko Kakutani compared di Giovanni's work to that of Belarusian Nobel laureate Svetlana Alexievich, writing: "Like the work of the Belarussian Nobel laureate Svetlana Alexievich, Ms. di Giovanni's book gives voice to ordinary people living through a dark time in history; ...it chronicles the intimate fallout that war has on women, children and families."

Kirkus Reviews described her as "a master of war reporting, especially its civilian side," noting that her work helps "Western readers... appreciate the chaos that Syrian refugees continue to flee. This brilliant, necessary book will hopefully do for Syria what Herr's Dispatches (1977) did for Vietnam."

Aidan Hartley, writing in The Daily Telegraph, called her "one of our generation's finest foreign correspondents," while the British Review of Journalism described her work as showing "established, accomplished brilliance."
