= Credo Harris =

American writer and radio station manager (1874–1956)

Credo Fitch Harris (1874–1956) was a journalist, novelist, and radio station manager in the United States. He lived in Kentucky and worked at WHAS in Louisville. The University of Louisville has a photograph of him.

The 1918 film One Dollar Bid was an adaptation of his novel Toby.

== Bibliography ==
- Toby; A Novel of Kentucky (1912)
- Motor Rambles in Italy (1912)
- Sunlight Patch (1915)
- Where the Souls of Men are Calling (1918)
- Wings of the Wind (1920)
- Microphone Memoirs; of the Horse and Buggy Days of Radio (1937), an autobiography
