= Hugh Smith (news anchor) =

American journalist

Hugh L. Smith
- Born: May 12, 1934; Madison, South Dakota
- Died: December 16, 2007 (aged 75); St. Petersburg, Florida
- Education: University of Minnesota
- Occupation: Reporter

Hugh L. Smith (May 12, 1934 - December 16, 2007) was a reporter, news anchor, and news director at WTVT in Tampa, Florida, from 1963 until his retirement in 1991. Having worked at WTVT for over 27 years, he is considered a television pioneer, being part of the first live color telecast in Tampa, the first remote broadcast, and the first hour-long newscast.

== Early life ==
Smith was born in Madison, South Dakota, and grew up in the small town of Pipestone, Minnesota. He developed an interest in radio by listening to broadcasters Edward R. Murrow, Eric Sevareid, Douglas Edwards, and Robert Trout. He earned a journalism degree at the University of Minnesota where he was a member of Phi Sigma Kappa fraternity. Smith graduated in 1956. He was editor-in-chief of the Minnesota Daily student newspaper during the 1955–56 academic year.

== Career ==
Smith's broadcast career started as staff writer for WCCO-AM in Minneapolis, Minnesota. He later went to work at WHAS AM/TV in Louisville, Kentucky, and later went to work at KVTV in Sioux City, Iowa, before coming to WTVT in 1963. He was named assistant news director of WTVT in 1966. In 1966 he anchored the first color newscast in Tampa. In 1976 he did their first remote live broadcast while reporting from a helicopter hovering 500 feet over a news scene. As news director he was instrumental in increasing the duration of WTVT's news coverage slots - first from 15 to 30 minutes, and then to 60 minutes. He held the dual post of news director and news anchor for 15 years. He left the station in 1991. He then substituted in April 1991 for radio station WMTX morning broadcaster Pat Brooks, and joined the WMTX's Mason Dixon morning show as news anchor. He died in St. Petersburg, Florida, on December 16, 2007, from complications from melanoma.
