= Molly Bingham =

American journalist and filmmaker

- Born: Louisville, Kentucky
- Education: Harvard College
- Years active: 1994–present
- Website: https://orbmedia.org/

Mary C. "Molly" Bingham is an American journalist and filmmaker.

== Early life ==
Molly Bingham grew up in Louisville, Kentucky and went to Brooks School in North Andover, Massachusetts, before getting her BA in 1990 at Harvard College in Medieval European History. In 1993 she traveled to Russia and Tibet and produced a portfolio from those trips that she showed to magazine and newspaper photo editors.

== Career as a journalist ==
In 1994 she traveled to Rwanda to cover ongoing events after the genocide. From that time until 1998, Bingham focused her work on central Africa, including Rwanda, Burundi and the Congo (then called Zaire). In addition to working as a journalist, Bingham has worked on three projects with Human Rights Watch over the years, one in Burundi, one on small arms trafficking in the Great Lakes region of central Africa and later a short emergency project in Sierra Leone.

In August 1998 Bingham began work as official photographer to the vice president at the White House, a job documenting the life of the vice president that she continued until January 2001.

Bingham returned to Africa in the spring of 2001, working on a story for the New York Times Sunday Magazine on the mining of the mineral coltan that is used to coat computer chips. On September 11th, 2001, Bingham was in western Virginia on a training course for journalists, but returned to Washington, D.C. to photograph the Pentagon and the feeling in the capital in the wake of the attacks for the New Yorker. Post 9/11 Bingham has spent time in Afghanistan, the Gaza Strip, Iran and fourteen months in Iraq.

During the 2004–05 academic year Bingham won a mid-career Nieman Fellowship at Harvard University and in 2011 was a Sulzberger Fellow at Columbia University. Bingham has won several awards including Pictures of the Year awards for her photography and an honorable mention from the Overseas Press Club for her story, "Ordinary Warriors: The Iraqi Resistance" that ran in the July 2004 issue of Vanity Fair. Bingham has given numerous talks at universities, on television and radio and is additionally one of five women journalists featured in the documentary Bearing Witness screened on A&E in May 2005. Bingham was named one of "20 Women to Watch" by The Columbia Journalism Review in July 2012.

Bingham co-directed and produced the documentary film Meeting Resistance with journalist Steve Connors. The film was reported over ten months in Baghdad in 2003 and 2004, and features interviews with Iraqis (and one Syrian) directly involved in the violent resistance to the occupation of the country. Meeting Resistance opened in theatres in the U.S. in the fall of 2007 and was released on DVD the following year. The film has subsequently been invited to screen around the world at universities, community groups and film festivals, as well as for US military audiences—including Baghdad where the directors were brought to how the film to military and diplomatic audiences.

The film won the "Golden Prize" at the Al Jazeera Film Festival among others and Bingham and Connors traveled extensively for sixteen months in support of the film and talking about their understanding of and experience in Iraq and how that knowledge translated into current events.

Bingham has expanded her work from photography to include writing and filmmaking. Her written work has been published in Vanity Fair, The Guardian, Nieman Reports and other online and print publications. After her Nieman Fellowship Bingham began considering the changes necessary within the structure of journalism to bring it into the current age. In 2009 she set up a site called "Transforming the Media" as a way to articulate her thinking on the media and interact with others on media issues.

== Recent work ==
Molly is currently president and CEO of Orb Media, a non-profit journalism organization whose research and global reporting produces stories that matter to billions of people around the world. Orb simultaneously publishes with members of its Orb Media Network, a group of the world's agenda setting media, reaching audiences in 180+ countries. By working this way Orb's journalism catalyzes global dialogue, generating change.

Bingham is a trustee of The Listen Campaign, a UK charity that campaigns for the needs and rights of the world's most vulnerable children, and on the advisory board of the Kentucky Center for Investigative Reporting, a nonprofit, nonpartisan newsroom focused on investigative journalism based in Louisville, KY.
