= WHAS (AM) =

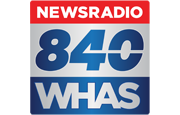
- Louisville, Kentucky; United States
- Broadcast area: Louisville metropolitan area
- Frequency: 840 kHz
- Branding: Newsradio 840 WHAS

Programming
- Format: News/talk
- Affiliations: ABC News Radio; CBS News Radio; Compass Media Networks; Premiere Networks; Westwood One; WLKY; UK Sports Network

Ownership
- Owner: iHeartMedia; (iHM Licenses, LLC)
- Sister stations: WAMZ; WKJK; WKRD; WSDF; WNRW; WQMF; WTFX-FM

History
- First air date: July 18, 1922
- Former frequencies: 833 & 619 kHz (1922); 750 & 619 kHz (1922–1923); 750 kHz (1923–1927); 650 kHz (1927); 930 kHz (1927–1928); 820 kHz (1928–1941)
- Call sign meaning: "We Have A Signal" (a backronym, as the call was randomly assigned by the government)

Technical information
- Licensing authority: FCC
- Facility ID: 11934
- Class: A
- Power: 50,000 watts
- Transmitter coordinates: 38°15′40″N 85°25′43″W (main antenna); 38°15′40″N 85°25′37″W (auxiliary antenna)
- Repeater: 97.5 WAMZ-HD2 (Louisville)

Links
- Public license information: Public file; LMS
- Webcast: Listen live (via iHeartRadio)
- Website: whas.iheart.com

WHAS (840 kHz) is a commercial AM radio station in Louisville, Kentucky, airing a news/talk radio format. It is owned by iHeartMedia, with studios in downtown Louisville, in the Fourth Street Live! entertainment complex. First licensed in July 1922, it is the oldest radio station in Kentucky.

WHAS is a Class A clear-channel station, powered at 50,000 watts non-directional, the maximum for commercial AM stations. Its daytime signal can be heard in most of central Kentucky, as well as almost half of Indiana (including Indianapolis) and much of southwestern Ohio (including Cincinnati and Dayton). Its nighttime signal can be heard in most of the Eastern and Central United States and much of Canada with a good radio.

== Programming ==
=== News and talk ===
iHeartMedia owns two talk stations in Louisville. WKJK 1080 AM is mostly a pass-through for syndicated shows while WHAS features mostly local programming and news. Weekdays begin with the Kentuckiana Morning News anchored by Tony Cruise. Tony & Dwight (Tony Vanetti and Dwight Witten) are heard in late mornings and The Terry Meiners Show airs in afternoon drive time. Syndicated programs include The Clay Travis and Buck Sexton Show, The Mark Levin Show, Ground Zero with Clyde Lewis and Coast to Coast AM with George Noory.

Weekends feature specialty shows on money, health, the outdoors, the law and home repair, some of which are paid brokered programming. Syndicated shows include Armstrong & Getty, The Ramsey Show with Dave Ramsey, The Weekend with Michael Brown, Bill Handel on the Law, Somewhere in Time with Art Bell, At Home with Gary Sullivan and Sunday Nights with Bill Cunningham. Nights and weekends, most hours begin with an update from ABC News Radio. WHAS is the flagship radio station for the annual WHAS Crusade for Children Telethon.

=== Sports ===
WHAS is Louisville's primary station for the University of Kentucky athletic broadcasts from the UK Sports Network. Play-by-play includes Wildcats football and men's basketball games.

Starting in 2015, iHeartMedia began broadcasting Louisville City FC soccer games. WHAS had been the flagship for U of L Sports Network coverage of Louisville Cardinals football and basketball, and still carries some the Cardinals games. When there is a conflict with Wildcats games, co-owned WKRD 790 AM broadcasts Cardinals games.

== History ==
=== Early years ===
The U.S. Department of Commerce, which regulated radio in its early days, adopted regulations, effective December 1, 1921, that formally established a broadcast service category. The wavelength of 360 meters (833 kHz) was designated for "entertainment" broadcasting, with 485 meters (619 kHz) assigned for "market and weather reports". On July 13, 1922, the Courier-Journal and Louisville Times were issued a license for operation on both the 360- and 485-meter wavelengths. The WHAS call letters were randomly assigned from a sequential list. Station manager Credo Fitch Harris travelled to Washington, D.C., to pick up the station license, and later recounted the following:

In the Department of Commerce a young man stated that our call letters were WHAS... "What does WHAS stand for?" I asked. "Search me," he answered agreeably. ... "I'm just reading it off your license."

WHAS was the first broadcasting station in Kentucky, which was the 45th out of the then-48 states to establish a station. Following a short series of test transmissions, WHAS made its formal debut broadcast on July 18, 1922.

In September 1922, the U.S. Department of Commerce set aside a second entertainment wavelength, 400 meters (750 kHz) for "Class B" stations, including WHAS, that had quality equipment and programming. However, concerned that an abrupt frequency change would make it difficult for listeners to pick up the signal, station manager Credo Fitch Harris made arrangements to temporarily remain on 360 meters. In May 1923, additional "Class B" frequencies were made available, with 750 kHz now reserved nationwide for Louisville, which was exclusively assigned to WHAS.

WHAS was originally part of the local media empire managed by the Bingham family, which also published Louisville Courier-Journal and Louisville Times (now owned by the Gannett Company and merged in 1987). On May 16, 1925, the first live broadcast of the Kentucky Derby horse race was made by WHAS and also by WGN in Chicago. The call of the Derby featured an announcer who watched from the windows of one of the famous twin spires of Churchill Downs.

On November 11, 1928, the Federal Radio Commission's (FRC) General Order 40 made a major reallocation of the broadcasting frequencies. This introduced a category known as "clear channel stations" that included WHAS, which was assigned exclusive nationwide use of 820 kHz.

=== CBS Radio Network ===
On May 15, 1932, WHAS changed from being an NBC Red Network affiliate, which it joined in late 1926. It switched to the Columbia Broadcasting System (CBS), which previously aired on WLAP, now relocated in Lexington. WHAS carried the network's dramas, comedies, sports and news during the "Golden Age of Radio." The studios were at 300 Liberty Street in Downtown Louisville, co-located with the Courier-Journal.

In the early 1930s, WHAS operated with 10,000 watts of power. But in 1932, the output was increased to 25,000 watts as authorized by the FRC.

During the Ohio River flood of 1937, the station gained nationwide notice for its coverage of the disaster. WHAS would broadcast Louisville flood bulletins over the facilities of WSM in Nashville after Louisville authorities were forced to cut electrical power to the city due to rising flood waters. This took WHAS's own signal off the air. During the flood, the station aired 115,000 messages.

=== Move to 840 AM ===
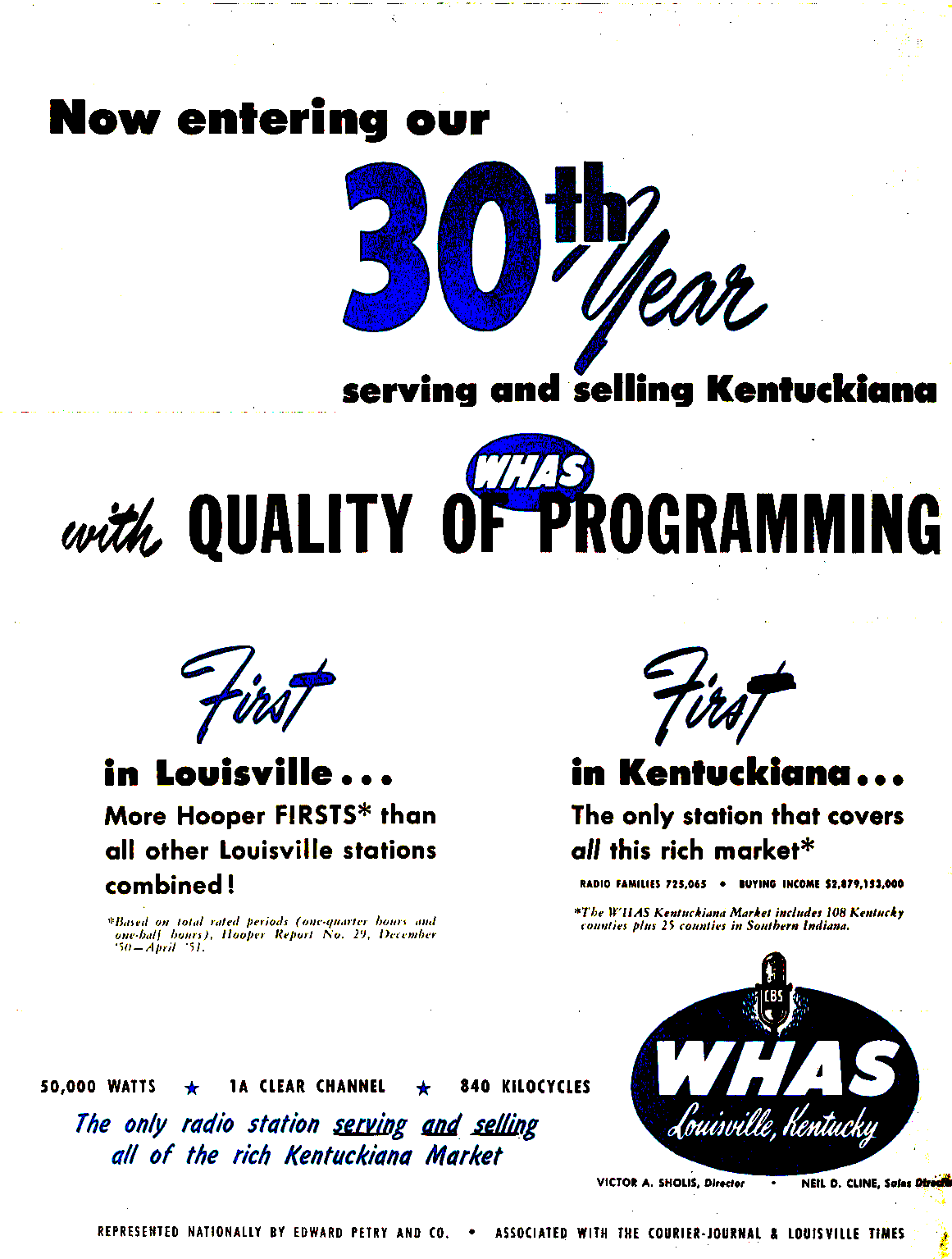
1951 advertisement

On March 29, 1941, the enactment of the North American Regional Broadcasting Agreement (NARBA) required many radio stations to change their dial positions. WHAS's clear channel frequency was shifted to its current assignment of 840 kHz.

In 1950, WHAS helped WSM-TV establish television service in Middle Tennessee with a microwave signal link from WHAS-TV.

WHAS was the home of The Moral Side of the News, one of the oldest public affairs programs in American broadcasting, dating back to the 1940s. The show was also seen on WHAS-TV since the 1950s. The program's panel of clergy members were involved in distributing the proceeds of the Crusade for Children among local charities since the telethon's beginning.

=== FM and TV stations ===
Experimental W9XEK began in 1944, at 45.5 MHz, on the original FM band. A second FM station was established on the newer FM band in 1947, when WCJT started at 99.7 FM, co-owned with WHAS. The WCJT call sign represented the initials of The Courier-Journal and Louisville Times. By the following year, W9XEK was taken off the air and WCJT became WHAS-FM. Few people owned FM radio receivers in that era. Seeing little chance to make it profitable, the Bingham Family returned WHAS-FM's license to the FCC on December 31, 1950. Their attention was already on setting up a new television station.

WHAS-TV first signed on the air on March 27, 1950. Originally broadcasting on channel 9, it was the second television station in Kentucky, after NBC affiliate WAVE-TV, which started in November 1948. WHAS-TV operated from brand-new studios in the Courier-Journal/Times Building at 6th & Broadway. Because WHAS 840 was a longtime CBS affiliate, WHAS-TV also aired CBS programming.

A second WHAS-FM began on September 7, 1966. It broadcast at 97.5 MHz with a 100,000-watt transmitter, airing an automated classical music format. The Binghams ran the station as a public service with almost no advertising. This format lasted until September 3, 1975, when WHAS-FM was renamed WNNS and adopted the NBC Radio Network's "News and Information Service" (NIS) all-news radio format. Today, that station is co-owned country music outlet WAMZ.

=== MOR and Adult Contemporary ===
As network programming moved from radio to television in the 1950s, WHAS began a full service format of news, sports and middle of the road (MOR) music. Disc jockeys hosted music shows with frequent breaks for news, weather, sports scores and other information.

WHAS modernized its format in the early 1970s. The playlist switched to adult contemporary, featuring adult-appeal hits and recent oldies. One longtime slogan was "Good and Gold" (as in "good music", or adult contemporary, and "golden" oldies). For a time in the 1980s, it was also the Louisville affiliate for Casey Kasem's American Top 40.

WHAS was the original radio home to locally produced coverage of American Basketball Association games involving the Kentucky Colonels during that league's 1967–1976 existence.

On the afternoon of April 3, 1974, Louisville was hit by an F4 tornado that developed during the 1974 Super Outbreak. WHAS broke away from regular programming to track the storm as it passed through the Louisville metropolitan area. In the hours immediately following the storm, the station delivered important information about what areas had been directly impacted by the storms, and traffic reporter Dick Gilbert followed the tornado in his helicopter, reporting on the damage as he flew at a safe distance behind the storm. The station stayed with continuous coverage of the disaster in Louisville and across the state of Kentucky and the southern portion of Indiana until well into the early morning hours of April 4. For their efforts, the station's personnel earned thanks from then-Kentucky Governor Wendell Ford and President Richard Nixon.

=== Clear Channel acquisition ===
In 1986, the Bingham Family decided to divest its media company holdings. WHAS and WAMZ (the former WHAS-FM) were acquired in 1986, by Clear Channel Communications based in San Antonio. In 2014, Clear Channel changed its name to iHeartMedia, WHAS's current owner.

WHAS 840 continued to air a full-service AC and oldies format through the 1980s. WHAS one of the last 50,000-watt clear-channel radio stations to feature music programming on a regular basis. Personalities on the weekday lineup included Terry Meiners and Lachlan McLean on "SportsTalk 840". By the 1990s, the music shows were ending and the station switched to a news–talk format.

On January 17, 1994, a record overnight snowstorm paralyzed the city and much of the state of Kentucky. WHAS had round the clock updates and school closing information for nearly a week. On May 28, 1996, another tornado outbreak occurred in Kentuckiana and the station suspended its election coverage that night to cover the storm.

Prior to 1995, WHAS broadcast in C-QUAM AM stereo. Following an initial testing period which started in 2006, beginning in September 2007 WHAS broadcast full-time using the HD Radio IBOC digital radio system. HD Radio has since been turned off.

=== Changes in air personalities ===
The late morning slot (9 am to noon) has seen several changes. Francene Cucinello hosted "The Francene Show" until her death on January 15, 2010. She was replaced that summer by Mandy Connell. In turn, Connell left in August 2013, to become the morning host on co-owned KHOW 630 AM in Denver. Her last show on WHAS was on August 9. For several months after her move, Connell provided daily one-minute commentaries, known as "Mandy Minutes", to WHAS. Connell's slot was filled by Leland Conway, previously a talk radio host in Lexington and most recently Richmond, Virginia, whose show began airing on September 16.

Significant changes came to the afternoon and evening lineup in the first half of 2015. In February, McLean announced he would leave WHAS on May 15 and move to Charlotte, North Carolina. In April, it was confirmed that Sports Talk 840 would end when McLean left WHAS. Effective May 18, Meiners' show was cut back by an hour. The 6–8 time slot was filled by Connell, who returned to the Louisville market with a locally focused talk show. Then longtime fill-in host Mary Walter took over as the permanent host and continued the local focused format. The Mark Levin Show moved to the 8–11 pm slot, being delayed by two hours instead of three. An extra hour of Ground Zero with Clyde Lewis was picked up.

At the same time as the spring 2015 lineup changes, WHAS replaced The Bill Cunningham Show in its Sunday night lineup with The John and Leah Show, a syndicated weekly news review program hosted by former WHAS personality John Ziegler and Leah Brandon. Cunningham's show, based at co-owned WLW Cincinnati, has since returned to Sunday evenings.

== Notable former on-air personalities ==
- Randy Atcher, children's host, cowboy singer
- Ford Bond, network announcer in the era of old-time radio
- Foster Brooks, show host and emergency reporter, 1937 Flood coverage
- Gary Burbank, afternoon DJ
- David Dick, newscaster, later with WHAS-TV and from 1966 to 1985 CBS News
- Cawood Ledford, sports
- Lachlan McLean, sports; final host of Sports Talk 840
- Don McNeill, national morning radio host
- Milton Metz, talk show host, notable for live broadcast after April 3, 1974, tornado that shared information about the aftermath.
- Hugh Smith
- Mary Walter, talk show host
- John Ziegler, talk show host

== See also ==
- WHAS-TV
- List of radio stations in Kentucky

== Bibliography ==
- Birdwhistell, Terry L. (1981). "WHAS Radio and the Development of Broadcasting in Kentucky, 1922–1942". Register of the Kentucky Historical Society. 79 (4): 333–353. JSTOR 23379633.
- Harris, Credo Fitch (1937). Microphone Memoirs of the Horse and Buggy Days of Radio. Bobbs-Merrill Company. (about WHAS and early radio in general)
