= Terry Meiners =

American radio and television personality (born 1957)

Terry Allen Meiners (born January 22, 1957) is an American radio and television personality on WHAS (AM) and WHAS-TV in Louisville, Kentucky. On radio, The Terry Meiners Show has aired weekday afternoons since 1985.

Meiners is known for broadcasting impersonations of prominent local citizens, and his satirical interviews of eclectic news figures, comedians, film and television stars, and politicians. Meiners co-hosted Great Day Live (news, knowledge, and nonsense) for 8 years with news anchor Rachel Platt weekday mornings on WHAS-TV. Pat Forde, a veteran sportswriter and Louisville resident now with Sports Illustrated, has called Meiners "a skilled smart aleck, a local legend who is able to skewer almost everyone without making too many enemies."

Academy Award winner Jennifer Lawrence calls Meiners her "first celebrity friend" and claims that "Terry Meiners still makes me starstruck."
