= WHAS-TV =

Television station in Louisville, Kentucky

- Louisville, Kentucky; United States
- Channels: Digital: 11 (VHF); Virtual: 11
- Branding: WHAS 11

Programming
- Affiliations: 11.1: ABC; for others, see § Subchannels

Ownership
- Owner: Tegna Inc., a subsidiary of Nexstar Media Group; (Sander Operating Co. I LLC D/B/A WHAS Television)

History
- Founded: September 19, 1946
- First air date: March 27, 1950
- Former channel numbers: Analog: 9 (VHF, 1950–1953), 11 (VHF, 1953–2009); Digital: 55 (UHF, 2000–2009)
- Former affiliations: CBS (1950–1990); ABC (secondary, 1950–1961)
- Call sign meaning: Derived from WHAS radio

Technical information
- Licensing authority: FCC
- Facility ID: 32327
- ERP: 16.4 kW
- HAAT: 392 m (1,286 ft)
- Transmitter coordinates: 38°21′23″N 85°50′52″W

Links
- Public license information: Public file; LMS
- Website: whas11.com

WHAS-TV (channel 11) is a television station in Louisville, Kentucky, United States, affiliated with ABC. Owned by the Tegna subsidiary of Nexstar Media Group, the station maintains studios on West Chestnut Street in Downtown Louisville, and its transmitter is located in rural northeastern Floyd County, Indiana (northeast of Floyds Knobs).

== History ==
The station first signed on the air on March 27, 1950. Originally broadcasting on VHF channel 9, it was the second television station to sign on in the Louisville market and the Commonwealth of Kentucky (after NBC affiliate WAVE-TV, which started in November 1948). WHAS-TV was founded by the Bingham family, publishers of morning newspaper The Courier-Journal, afternoon newspaper The Louisville Times and operator of WHAS (840 AM), Louisville's oldest radio station. It operated from brand-new studios in the Courier-Journal/Times Building at 6th & Broadway, in downtown Louisville. Even though WHAS-TV's construction permit was issued in 1946, before WAVE-TV's (1947), the Bingham family waited until the new TV facility was finished to go on the air. As a result, channel 9 signed on 16 months after WAVE-TV, who adapted an existing building at Preston and Broadway.

The station originally operated as a primary CBS affiliate, owing to its sister radio station's longtime affiliation with the CBS Radio Network, with a secondary affiliation with ABC. It moved to VHF channel 11 on February 7, 1953, one of several channel shifts resulting from the Federal Communications Commission's 1952 Sixth Report and Order. Under the same decree, WAVE-TV relocated from channel 5 to channel 3.

Following the move to channel 11, the station became to first to increase its effective radiated power to 316,000 watts, the maximum allowed for a high-band VHF station, resulting in a greatly increased signal coverage area. When the FCC gradually enforced print-broadcast cross-ownership restrictions in the early 1970s, the Commission granted the Binghams a grandfathered cross-ownership waiver to retain their Louisville holdings.

Barry Bingham Sr., patriarch of the family media empire, handed over control to his son Barry Jr. upon his retirement from active involvement in 1971. But following nearly fifteen years of family infighting, the senior Bingham decided to break up the family's media holdings in early 1986. The decision resulted in the sales of WHAS radio (and its sister FM station, WAMZ) to Clear Channel Communications; the Courier-Journal and the Times to the Gannett Company; and WHAS-TV to the Providence Journal Company. The Journal Company merged with the Belo Corporation in 1997.

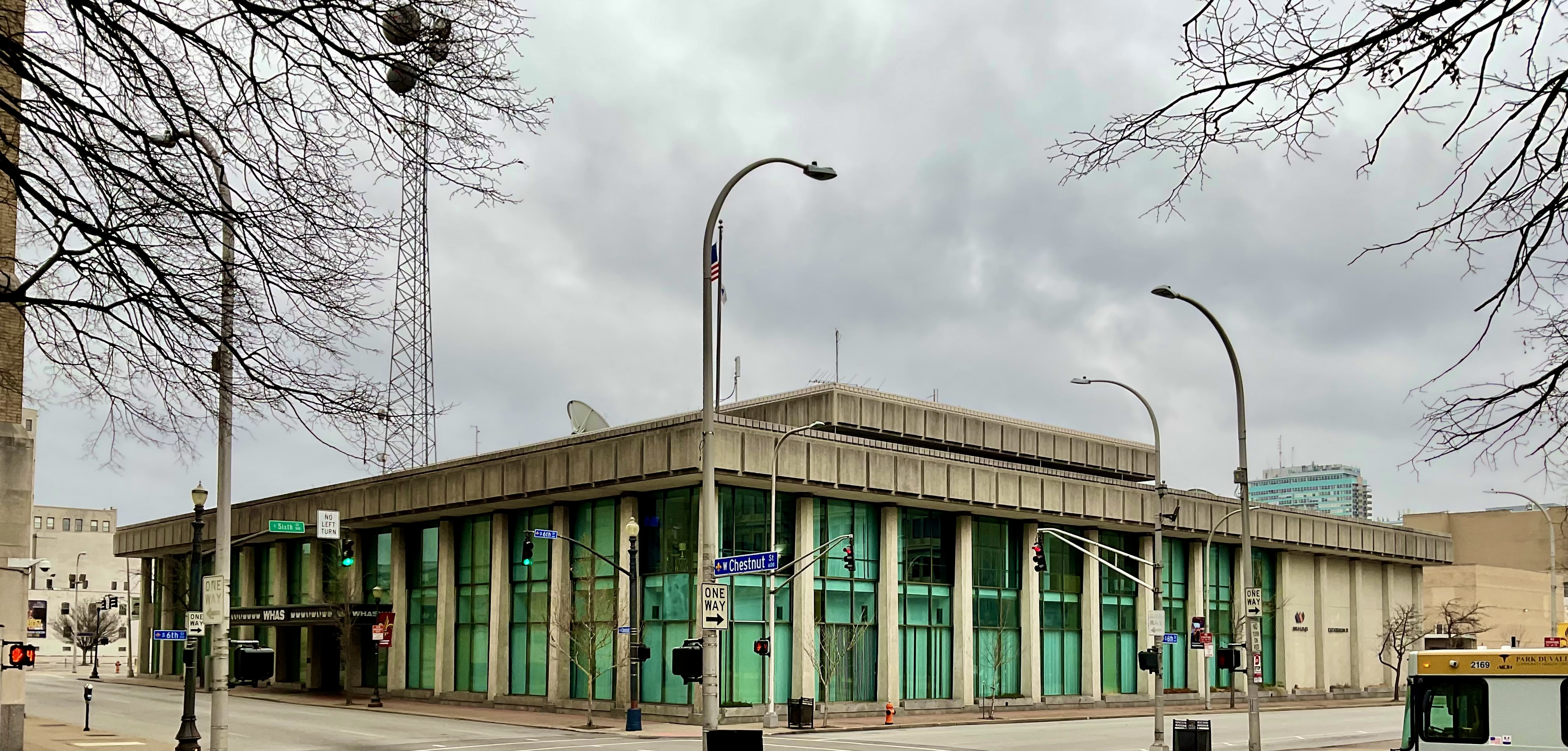
WHAS-TV's downtown studio, which share the same block as that of its former sister paper, the Courier-Journal, to the south.

WHAS-TV lost ABC programming for nearly 30 years when WLKY (channel 32) signed on September 16, 1961, as that network's Louisville affiliate, with channel 11 becoming an exclusive CBS affiliate. Nearly three decades later as mentioned on September 8, 1990, channel 11 terminated its prolonged relationship with CBS and rejoined ABC, this time as an exclusive affiliate of the network, of which it remains to this day. At the time of the switch, ABC was the second-most-watched network in the country (after NBC), and the network was concerned with perennial third-place WLKY's ratings. At the same time, CBS was at a distant third during the midway-point of president Laurence Tisch's helming of the network. WLKY, which became the market's CBS affiliate, has since made strong strides in the market as cable penetration allowed WLKY's traditional disadvantage of being on the UHF band to fade, and other factors allowed the station to strengthen its news operation and adequately compete with WHAS-TV's newscasts. In addition, WLKY became the local home for the NCAA Division I men's basketball tournament, and owing to the region's status as a college basketball hotbed with local teams such as Kentucky, Louisville and Indiana being longtime fixtures in the tournament, NCAA tournament games on WLKY are consistently among the highest-rated programs in the market during the tournament's run. Channel 11 has seen some struggles over the years during television seasons when ABC suffers from a weaker-rated schedule, while WLKY's ties to CBS have boosted that station through most of the 2000s. With ABC's current schedule, both stations usually exchange the top rankings in the Louisville market's news ratings.

On June 13, 2013, Belo announced that it would be acquired by the Gannett Company. Due to Gannett's ownership of The Courier-Journal, the company chose to spin off WHAS-TV to Sander Media, LLC (a media company operated by former Belo executive Jack Sander), with Gannett operating the station through a shared services agreement. The sale was completed on December 23. The SSA marked a re-entry into Louisville television for Gannett, which owned WLKY from 1979 (after Combined Communications merged with Gannett) until it sold the station to Pulitzer, Inc. in 1983.

On June 29, 2015, Gannett split into two publicly traded companies. The print interests retained the Gannett name, while the broadcasting and digital media interests became Tegna. Shortly afterward, Sander Media filed with the FCC to transfer WHAS-TV's license to Tegna's Belo Kentucky, Inc.; the acquisition was completed on December 3, 2015.

== Programming ==
As an ABC station, WHAS-TV splits the syndicated block Litton's Weekend Adventure over two days, with the first two hours airing after its Saturday morning newscast and the third hour airing on Sunday mornings. The station produces the hour-long talk program Great Day Live!, which airs weekdays at 9 a.m. The program debuted in September 2011, replacing longtime 9 a.m. slotholder Live with Kelly, and is formatted as a mix of interviews and paid demonstration segments.

=== Special programming ===
The station broadcasts the annual WHAS Crusade for Children, a highly successful local telethon benefiting children's charities throughout Kentucky and southern Indiana, with fundraisers leading up to the telethon broadcast on the first weekend of June. It also originated one of the nation's longest-running public service programs, Moral Side of the News, featuring a local interfaith clergy panel discussing the week's events in the light of faith. The panel also administers the annual grants from the Crusade for Children telethon.

=== Sports programming ===
WHAS-TV originated the first television broadcast of the Kentucky Derby locally in 1950 and 1951, and once network lines were extended to Louisville in 1952, the station originated a national telecast for CBS that year. Through CBS, WHAS-TV continued to carry the Derby through 1974. When the Derby's broadcast rights moved to ABC (which was affiliated with WLKY at the time) in 1975, Churchill Downs included a provision in the contract requiring ABC to allow channel 11 to produce its own local Derby coverage, including the race itself. The provision became moot when WHAS-TV joined ABC fifteen years later. However, after the Triple Crown races moved to NBC in 2001, WHAS-TV lost the Kentucky Derby rights to that network's Louisville affiliate, WAVE. Channel 11, through ABC, regained the rights to the Belmont Stakes in 2006, and the station also simulcast the 2006 Breeders' Cup from Churchill Downs that aired on ESPN. With the departure of the Belmont to NBC in 2011, WHAS-TV no longer broadcasts any Triple Crown horse races.

In May 2014, WHAS-TV and NBC affiliate WAVE were granted rights to Atlantic Coast Conference football and basketball coverage provided by the Raycom Sports–operated ACC Network. This is due in part of the University of Louisville joining the ACC in July of that year. The arrangement ended after the 2019 ACC men's basketball tournament, after which the ESPN-partnered cable-only ACC Network launched.

On May 8, 2024, WHAS-TV was announced as one of several television stations to carry Indiana Fever regional telecasts syndicated by local broadcast partner and sister station WTHR. The 17 games were scheduled to be split between WHAS's main channel and WHAS-DT2. These will air in addition to national WNBA telecasts on ABC.

=== News operation ===
WHAS-TV at present broadcasts 38 1/2 hours of locally produced newscasts each week (with 6 1/2 hours each weekday and three hours each on Saturdays and Sundays). Not surprisingly for a station with roots in a newspaper, WHAS-TV has been an innovator in news coverage. It was the first television station in Kentucky to use newsreel film to gather footage for stories. From the late 1970s until 1991, as a CBS affiliate, the station's newscasts were titled Action 11 News. In 1991, its news branding was changed to Kentuckiana's News Channel, WHAS 11. In 1999, the station rebranded its newscasts as WHAS 11 News.

In the late 1970s, WHAS-TV displaced long-dominant WAVE-TV in the local news ratings and became the highest-rated news station in Louisville. It held the lead through the early 21st century, often by a wide margin. While it still leads WAVE and WLKY in most timeslots, its dominance is not nearly as absolute as it once was. In recent years, it has lost the lead in the 11 p.m. slot to WLKY. During the May 2006 ratings period, WHAS-TV placed fourth at 11 p.m. (behind syndicated reruns of Sex and the City on Fox affiliate WDRB (channel 41)); however by May 2007, it had regained the runner-up spot behind WLKY.

On January 2, 2006, WHAS-TV began producing a 10 p.m. newscast for then-WB affiliate WBKI-TV (channel 34, later a CW affiliate) through a news share agreement. On August 24, 2009, WHAS-TV became the second station in the Louisville market (after WAVE) to begin broadcasting its local newscasts in a widescreen picture format. Unlike WAVE (and eventually WDRB), WHAS-TV produces its newscasts in 16:9 standard definition. The WBKI-TV broadcast was presented in 4:3 standard definition as that station did not have a modernized master control facility to allow the program to be transmitted in native widescreen. WHAS-TV's news share agreement with WBKI-TV ended on October 26, 2012, the result of a shared services agreement that was formed between Block Communications, which owns WDRB and then-MyNetworkTV affiliate WMYO (channel 58), and WBKI-TV owner LM Communications, LLC (the 10 p.m. newscast was replaced by syndicated programming, with WDRB subsequently producing a half-hour 7 p.m. newscast for WBKI-TV).

On July 2, 2014, WHAS-TV changed over to Gannett's USA Today-inspired standard graphics design, requiring local cable and pay-TV providers to display the station in widescreen full-time on standard definition sets with the AFD#10 code. It also discontinued use of the Frank Gari-composed "Newschannel" theme package, which the station had used in various forms since 1991, switching to Gannett's standard "This is Home" package, also produced by Gari.

==== Notable current on-air staff ====
- Elle Smith – reporter and Miss USA 2021

==== Notable former on-air staff ====
- Mort Crim
- Terry Meiners – former co-host of Great Day Live!
- Milton Metz – host of WHAS-TV's Omelet (1970–1979) and WHAS Radio's Metz Here (1960s–1980s)
- Tom Mintier – reporter
- Hugh Smith
- Stacy Smith
- Richard Threlkeld

== Technical information ==
=== Subchannels ===
The station's signal is multiplexed:

Subchannels of WHAS-TV
Subchannel	Res.	Short name	Programming
11.1	720p	WHAS-HD	ABC
11.2	480i	Crime	True Crime Network
11.3	480i	Quest	Quest
11.4	480i	BUSTED	Busted
11.5	480i	NEST	The Nest
11.6	480i	GetTV	Great
11.7	480i	HSN	HSN
11.8	480i	QVC	QVC
11.9	480i	DABL	Dabl

In October 2009, WHAS-TV began carrying the Wazoo Sports Network, a regional sports network devoted to high school and minor league athletics and sports from the University of Louisville and University of Kentucky, over digital subchannel 11.3; both WHAS-TV and Lexington NBC affiliate WLEX-TV served as Wazoo's charter affiliates. The network had previously operated as an online-only service before becoming a multicast service. Wazoo Sports was dropped by WHAS-TV on December 18, 2011, due to the network's parent failing to pay the station for services and a lack of confidence by station management in the network's business plan. Wazoo's parent company filed for bankruptcy on January 9, 2012. A still screen noting the Wazoo termination remained on 11.3 until November 21, when it was replaced by a live image of the station's Doppler radar system.

=== Analog-to-digital conversion ===
WHAS-TV ended regular programming on its analog signal, over VHF channel 11, on June 12, 2009, the official date on which full-power television stations in the United States transitioned from analog to digital broadcasts under federal mandate. The station's digital signal relocated from its pre-transition UHF channel 55, which was among the high band UHF channels (52–69) that were removed from broadcasting use as a result of the transition, to its analog-era VHF channel 11.

== Out-of-market coverage ==
=== Frankfort ===
WHAS-TV, along with WAVE and WLKY, is available on the Frankfort Plant Board's cable system serving Kentucky's state capital. On December 20, 2017, the Frankfort Plant Board announced that it would drop WHAS and competitor WAVE on January 1, 2018 in order to curb rising retransmission consent costs that were being passed on to its customers. However, by December 28, Frankfort Plant Board had re-entered negotiations to continue carriage of WHAS. On December 29, Frankfort Plant Board announced they had reached a deal to keep the station on the cable system through December 31, 2020. The channel was never removed and remained on its longtime channel positions of 11 and 511 (HD).

=== Lawrenceburg ===
WHAS-TV, along with WAVE, is available on cable providers in Lawrenceburg, Kentucky (Anderson County).

=== Southern Kentucky ===
In Barren County, Kentucky, which is in the Bowling Green media market, WHAS-TV and WHAS-DT2 (along with a few other Louisville stations) were also piped in by the cable system of the Glasgow Electric Plant Board, as well as the cable television system of the South Central Rural Telephone Cooperative. Mediacom's customers in Hart and Metcalfe counties also have access to the main channel of WHAS-TV as a second choice for ABC programming as opposed to local ABC station WBKO in the event that either station preempts an ABC program for severe weather coverage or breaking news coverage. The SCRTC's customers in Monroe County, Kentucky (in the Nashville media market), also had access to WHAS-TV, as well as WBKO and Nashville's ABC station WKRN-TV. WHAS and WAVE, along with WAVE's Bounce TV subchannel were both dropped from both Glasgow-based cable systems (except for the SCRTC systems in Green and Larue Counties) in 2018.

Prior to the 1990 network affiliation swap, WHAS-TV also served as one of the two default CBS affiliates for parts of the Bowling Green market on cable along with Nashville's WTVF, because Bowling Green did not have a CBS affiliate of its own. Bowling Green's Storer Communications (later Insight Communications, now Spectrum) franchise has dropped WHAS from its lineup as that system was also carrying Nashville's WKRN-TV alongside WBKO at the time of the affiliation change; it was later replaced by WLKY as a backup CBS affiliate on that system. WLKY would eventually be dropped from the Insight Communications lineup in Bowling Green on February 1, 2007, when NBC affiliate WNKY launched a CBS-affiliated second digital subchannel.

== See also ==
- WHAS (AM)
- List of media of Louisville, Kentucky
