= Barry Bingham Sr. =

American journalist (1906–1988)

- Born: George Barry Bingham; February 10, 1906; Louisville, Kentucky, U.S.
- Died: August 15, 1988 (aged 82); Louisville, Kentucky, U.S.
- Resting place: Cave Hill Cemetery, Louisville
- Education: Harvard University
- Years active: 1937–1971
- Children: Barry Bingham Jr. (son); Sallie Bingham (daughter)

George Barry Bingham Sr. (February 10, 1906 – August 15, 1988) was the patriarch of a family that dominated local media in Louisville for several decades in the 20th century.

== Family and career ==
George Barry Bingham Sr. was born on February 10, 1906, in Louisville, Kentucky. Bingham's family owned a cluster of influential media properties – The Courier-Journal and The Louisville Times newspapers, plus WHAS Radio and WHAS Television. The papers had been purchased by his father, Col. Robert Worth Bingham, using proceeds from an inheritance left by his second wife, Mary Lily Kenan Flagler, herself the widow of railroad magnate Henry Flagler.

Bingham attended Harvard University, then went into the family businesses. In 1931, he married Mary Caperton, a Radcliffe graduate. Bingham Sr. took the reins of the company in 1937; his elder brother Robert Worth Bingham Jr was considered incapable of taking control of the family business because of his alcoholism, and settled in England, where he married. At the time, "The C-J" was little more than a Democratic Party organ, but Bingham built it into national prominence, thanks to reporting that was ambitious in scope for a newspaper in a city of Louisville's size. Throughout Bingham's tenure, the editorial voices of the C-J & Times was forthrightly liberal, especially for a fairly conservative (though predominantly Democratic at the time) state like Kentucky. The newspapers were recipients of six Pulitzer Prizes, including one for public service in 1967, plus multiple other awards during the Bingham years. The Courier-Journal became the commonwealth's dominant newspaper, a position it retains to this day. He also founded WHAS-TV, the city's second television station, and founded the WHAS Crusade for Children, a telethon broadcast on both the radio and television stations that today collects more than $6,000,000 each year for local children's charities. The family also owned Standard Gravure, a rotogravure printing company that printed the newspapers' Sunday magazine section, plus Sunday sections for other newspapers.

In World War II, Bingham served as an officer in the United States Navy, and was twice awarded the Bronze Star. Bingham Sr. was given the rank of Commandeur, Légion d'honneur, by French government for service. In 1950, he was elected a Fellow of the American Academy of Arts and Sciences. He was a Fulbright lecturer at Oxford University in 1955.

On July 7, 1951, Bingham, along with Jane Darwell, was a guest on the CBS variety television series, Faye Emerson's Wonderful Town, when the program hosted Louisville and its music heritage.

In 1971, Bingham stepped down from day-to-day operations and handed over the operations of the company to his remaining son, Barry Bingham Jr. Bingham Sr. died at his home in Louisville on August 15, 1988, at age 82. Bingham Jr. died on April 3, 2006.

== See also ==
- List of people from the Louisville metropolitan area
- Louisville Falls Fountain, a floating fountain in the Ohio River made possible by a $2.6 million donation from Bingham and his wife Mary in 1988
- Worth Bingham Prize, established in memory of Barry Bingham's son, Worth Bingham
