= Courier Journal =

American daily newspaper in Louisville, Kentucky

The Courier-Journal
- The July 27, 2005 front page of The Courier-Journal
- Type: Daily newspaper
- Format: Broadsheet
- Owner: USA Today Co.
- President: Eddie Tyner
- Editor: Mary Irby-Jones
- Founded: November 8, 1868; 158 years ago
- Political alignment: Whig (formerly)
- Headquarters: 525 West Broadway; Louisville, Kentucky 40201; United States
- Circulation: 29,818 daily; 40,898 Sunday; (as of Q3 2022)
- ISSN: 1930-2177
- Website: courier-journal.com

The Courier Journal, also known as the Louisville Courier Journal (and informally The C-J or The Courier), and called The Courier-Journal between November 8, 1868, and October 29, 2017, is a daily newspaper published in Louisville, Kentucky, and owned by USA Today Co., which bills it as "Part of the USA Today Network".

It is the newspaper with the highest number of recorded circulation in Kentucky. According to the 1999 Editor & Publisher International Yearbook, the paper is the 48th-largest daily paper in the United States.

== History ==
=== Origins ===
The Courier-Journal was created from the merger of several newspapers introduced in Kentucky in the 19th century.

A pioneer paper called The Focus of Politics, Commerce and Literature was founded in 1826 in Louisville when the city was an early settlement of less than 7,000 individuals. In 1830 a new newspaper, The Louisville Daily Journal, began distribution in the city and, in 1832, the Journal absorbed The Focus of Politics, Commerce and Literature. The Louisville Journal was an organ of the Whig Party and was founded and edited by George D. Prentice, a New Englander who initially came to Kentucky to write a biography of Henry Clay. Prentice edited the Journal for more than 40 years.

In 1844, another newspaper, the Louisville Morning Courier, was founded in Louisville by Walter Newman Haldeman. The Louisville Daily Journal and the Louisville Morning Courier were leading newspapers in Louisville and were politically opposed throughout the Civil War; The Journal was against slavery while the Courier was pro-Confederacy. The Courier was suppressed by the Union and had to move to Nashville, but it returned to Louisville after the war.

Upon the announcement of the Emancipation Proclamation that ended slavery in the Confederate states, the Journal opposed the Proclamation as an unconstitutional use of presidential power, and predicted: "Kentucky cannot and will not acquiesce in this measure. Never!" In 1868, an ailing Prentice persuaded the 28-year-old Henry Watterson to come edit for the Journal. During secret negotiations in 1868, The Journal and the Courier merged, and the first edition of The Courier-Journal was delivered to Louisvillians on Sunday morning, November 8, 1868.

=== Watterson era ===
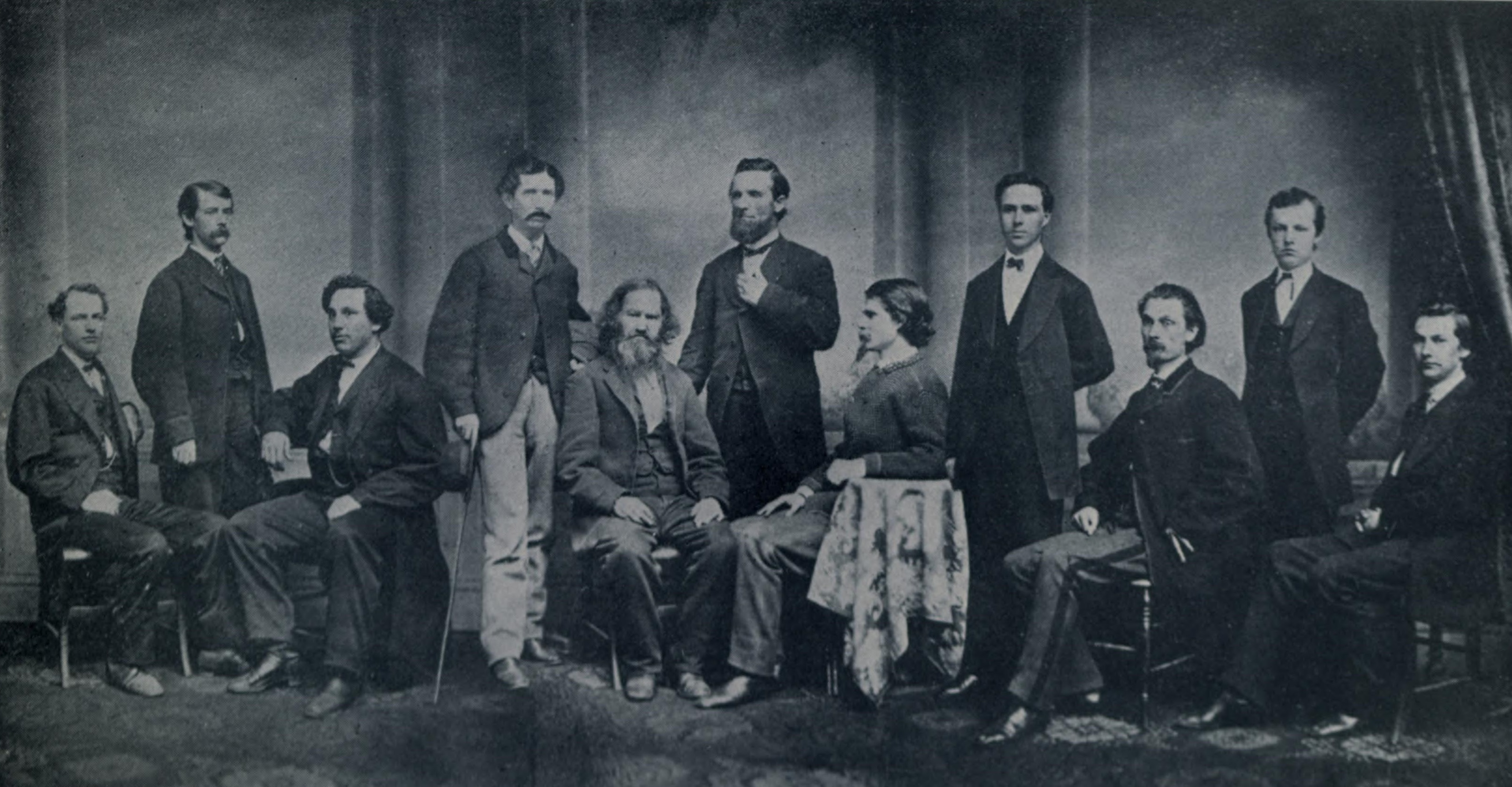
Editorial staff of The Courier-Journal, 1868

Henry Watterson, the son of a Tennessee congressman, had written for Harper's Magazine and The New York Times before enlisting in the Confederate Army. He became nationally known for his work as The Courier-Journal emerged as the region's leading paper. He supported the Democratic Party and pushed for the industrialization of Kentucky and the South in general, notably through urging the Southern Exposition be held in Louisville. He attracted controversy for attempting to prove that Christopher Marlowe had actually written the works of Shakespeare. He won a Pulitzer Prize in 1917 for editorials demanding the United States enter World War I.

The Courier-Journal founded a companion afternoon edition of the paper, The Louisville Times, in May 1884. In 1896, Watterson and Haldeman opposed Democratic presidential candidate William Jennings Bryan over his support of free silver coinage. This unpopular decision upset readers and advertisers, many of whom pulled their support for The Courier-Journal. Kentucky voted for the Republican candidate in 1896, the first time in state history, and local political leaders blamed the Courier. Only the popularity of The Louisville Times, which had no strong editorial reputation, saved the newspaper company from bankruptcy. The Courier supported Bryan in future elections.

Haldeman had owned the papers until his death in 1902, and by 1917 they were owned by his son, William, and Henry Watterson.

=== Bingham ownership ===
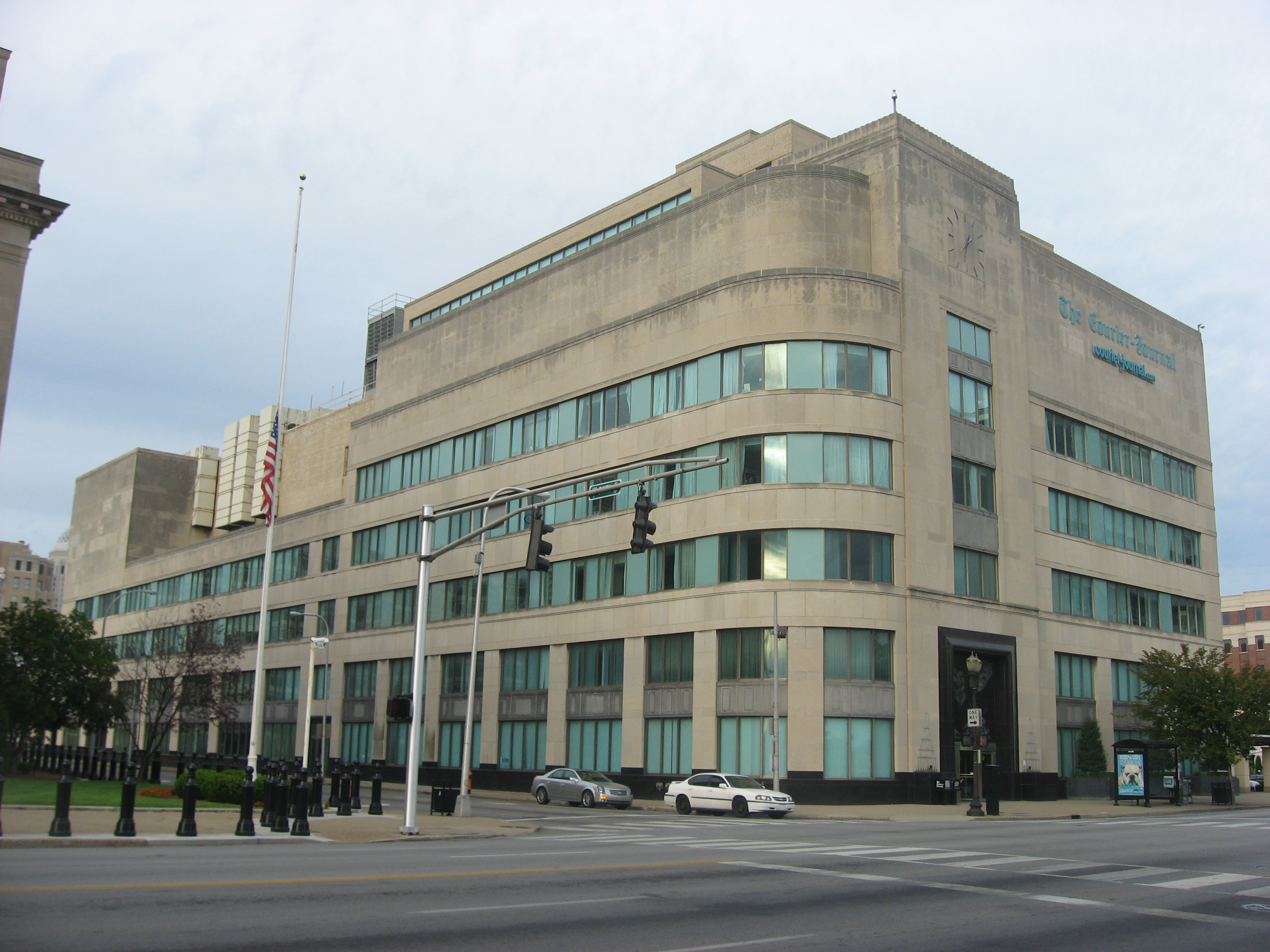
Courier-Journal offices in downtown Louisville, built during the Bingham era

On August 8, 1918, Robert Worth Bingham purchased two-thirds interest in the newspapers and acquired the remaining stock in 1920. The liberal Bingham clashed with longtime editor Watterson, who remained on board, but was in the twilight of his career. Watterson's editorials opposing the League of Nations appeared alongside Bingham's favoring it, and Watterson finally retired on April 2, 1919.

I have always regarded the newspapers owned by me as a public trust and have endeavored so to conduct them as to render the greatest public service.

— Robert Worth Bingham

As publisher, Bingham set the tone for his editorial pages, and pushed for improved public education, support of African Americans and the poor of Appalachia. In 1933, the newspapers passed to his son, Barry Bingham, Sr. Barry Bingham would continue in his father's footsteps, guiding the editorial page and modernizing the paper by setting up several news bureaus throughout the state, expanding the news staff. During Barry Bingham, Sr.'s tenure, the paper was considered Kentucky's "Newspaper of Record" and consistently ranked among the 10 best in the nation.

In 1971, Barry Bingham, Jr. succeeded his father as the newspapers' editor and publisher.

The Binghams also owned the leading local radio and television stations—WHAS-TV, WHAS-AM, and WAMZ-FM—and Standard Gravure, a rotogravure printing company that printed The Courier-Journal's Sunday Magazine as well as similar magazines for other newspapers.

Barry Bingham Jr. sought to free the papers from conflicts of interests, and through The Louisville Times, experimented with new ideas such as signed editorials. Bingham Jr. also parted with tradition by endorsing several Republican candidates for office.

In 1974, Carol Sutton became managing editor of The Courier-Journal, the first woman appointed to such a post at a major US daily newspaper. Under the leadership of C. Thomas Hardin, director of photography, the combined photography staff of The Courier-Journal and Louisville Times was awarded the 1976 Pulitzer Prize for Feature Photography for its coverage of school desegregation in Louisville.

Barry Bingham, Jr. served as editor and publisher until he resigned in 1986, shortly after his father announced that the newspaper company was for sale, in large measure because of disagreements between Bingham Jr. and his sister Sallie.

=== Gannett ownership ===
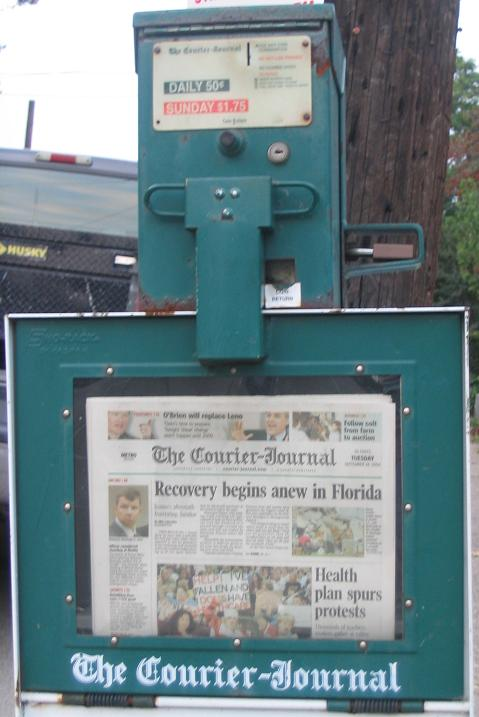
A Courier Journal dispenser

On January 8, 1986, Barry Bingham Sr. announced his intent to sell the family owned media properties including the Courier-Journal. In July 1986, Gannett Company, Inc. purchased the newspaper company for $300 million, outbidding The Washington Post and the Tribune company. Gannett appointed George N. Gill President and Publisher who had been with the newspaper and the Binghams for over two decades. Gill worked his way up from copy editor to chief executive officer of the Bingham Companies. In 1993, Gill retired and Edward E. Manassah became president and Publisher.

February 1987 saw the last publication of The Louisville Times, which like most afternoon papers had experienced declining readership; the news operations of the two papers had previously been consolidated under Gannett. The surviving Courier featured a strong news content increase by 29%.

In 1989, the paper's news staff won the Pulitzer Prize for general local reporting for what the Pulitzer board called "exemplary initial coverage" of a collision that was the nation's worst drunk-driving crash and school-bus accident. In 2005, cartoonist Nick Anderson won the paper's 10th Pulitzer, but when he left for the Houston Chronicle, the paper did not replace him, instead relying largely on submissions from local cartoonists. One, lawyer Marc Murphy, has become a near-regular and gained respect for his work.

The newspaper resumed polling on elections, and began video streaming its editorial-board conferences with major candidates, under Publisher Arnold "Arnie" Garson, who came from the Argus Leader, Gannett's paper in Sioux Falls, South Dakota, in late 2008. Garson is an outspoken promoter of the future of printed newspapers in the digital age. Under him, the paper began keeping occasional major stories or sports columns off its website and promoting them as print exclusives. Most of these have run on Sundays; in July 2009, Garson announced that the paper's Sunday home-delivery circulation was up 0.5 percent over the previous year.

In March 2022, the Courier Journal moved to a six-day printing schedule, eliminating its printed Saturday edition.

== Awards ==
=== Pulitzer Prize ===
Year	Category	Recipient	For
1918	Editorial Writing	Henry Watterson	For his two World War I editorials "War Has Its Compensations" (April 10, 1918), and "Vae Victis!" (May 17, 1918)
1926	Reporting	William Burke "Skeets" Miller	For his coverage of the attempts to rescue Floyd Collins trapped in Sand Cave, now part of Mammoth Cave National Park (February 1925)
1956	Editorial Cartooning	Robert York	For his cartoon "Achilles" showing a bulging figure of American prosperity tapering to a weak heel labeled "farm prices". Appeared in The Louisville Times, (September 16, 1955)
1967	Public Service	The Courier-Journal	For its "meritorious public service" during 1966 in its fight against the ravages of Kentucky strip mining
1969	Local General or Spot News Reporting	John Fetterman	For coverage of the funeral for a Vietnam casualty from Kentucky, "Pfc. Gibson Comes Home" (July 28, 1968)
1976	Feature Photography	The Courier-Journal and The Louisville Times	For photo coverage of court-ordered busing in Jefferson County in 1975
1978	Local General or Spot News Reporting	Rich Whitt	For his coverage and three months of investigation of the disastrous May 28, 1977, fire at the Beverly Hills Supper Club, Southgate, Kentucky in Campbell County
1980	International Reporting	Joel Brinkley and Jay Mather	For international reporting in a series of articles, "Living the Cambodian Nightmare", their vivid account of refugees in Southeast Asia (December 1979)
1989	General Reporting	The Courier-Journal	For its exemplary initial coverage of a bus crash in Carroll County, Kentucky that claimed 27 lives and its subsequent thorough and effective examination of the causes and implications of the tragedy (1988)
2005	Editorial Cartoon	Nick Anderson	For his portfolio of twenty editorial cartoons
2020	Breaking News Reporting	The Courier-Journal	For coverage of outgoing Kentucky Gov. Matt Bevin's hundreds of pardons.

== Other notable staff ==
- Herbert Agar, Courier-Journal editor
- Anne and Carl Braden, Courier-Journal reporters and civil rights activists
- Adele Brandeis, Courier-Journal writer and arts administrator
- Samuel C. Brightman, Courier-Journal reporter and Washington correspondent
- Grady Clay, Courier-Journal urban affairs editor
- Byron Crawford, Courier-Journal columnist
- Joe Creason, Courier-Journal columnist, known for "Joe Creason's Kentucky" column
- R. G. Dunlop, Courier-Journal reporter
- Howard Fineman, Courier-Journal reporter and Washington correspondent
- Pat Forde, Courier-Journal sports columnist
- Michael Gartner, Courier-Journal editor
- Kate Harrington, Louisville Journal reporter
- Hugh Haynie, Courier-Journal political cartoonist
- Paul Janensch, Courier-Journal executive editor
- Mike King, Courier-Journal reporter, editor, Washington correspondent, and medical writer
- Alan Levy, Courier-Journal reporter
- Ronni Lundy, Courier-Journal and Louisville Times pop music editor
- Paul Plaschke, Courier-Journal and Louisville Times cartoonist
- Priscilla Robertson, Courier-Journal literary editor
- Harvey Magee Watterson, Courier-Journal editorial staff, father of the paper's first editor

== See also ==
- Branzburg v. Hayes – landmark Supreme Court case involving a Courier-Journal reporter
- Lexington Herald-Leader – second-largest newspaper in Kentucky
- Louisville Eccentric Observer (aka LEO Weekly or LEO) – free urban alternative weekly newspaper
- News and Tribune – six-day daily newspaper serving Clark and Floyd Counties in Southern Indiana
- Scripps National Spelling Bee – formerly the National Spelling Bee, organized by The Courier-Journal in 1925
- Velocity (2003–2011) – free weekly magazine published by The Courier-Journal
- List of newspapers in Kentucky
