= List of people from the Louisville metropolitan area =

This is a list of people from the Louisville metropolitan area in the United States. The Louisville metropolitan area consists of twelve counties in two states—Kentucky and Indiana. Included are notable people who were either born or raised there, or have maintained residency for a significant period.

== Actors and entertainment ==
- Matt Battaglia, actor in and producer of more than 100 films; produced Brothers with Tobey Maguire, Jake Gyllenhaal and Natalie Portman; co-founder of Derby Eve cancer benefit the Mint Jubilee
- Ned Beatty, character actor of film, TV and stage; appeared in a wide variety of roles in movies such as The Life and Times of Judge Roy Bean, Deliverance, Superman (1978), Network, 1941 and Toy Story 3
- James Best, character actor, known for his role as Sheriff Rosco P. Coltrane on The Dukes of Hazzard
- Lois Bewley, dancer and choreographer
- Foster Brooks, actor and comedian; known for his "Lovable Lush" character; long-time Las Vegas headliner; appeared on numerous TV programs from the mid-1960s to mid-1990s; cameo roles in The Villain and Cannonball Run II; perhaps best known for his frequent appearances on the Dean Martin Celebrity Roasts, and on the Dean Martin Show
- Tod Browning, film actor and director; directed several films starring silent screen legend Lon Chaney Sr., among them The Unholy 3 (1925) and West of Zanzibar (1928); known for directing the horror classic Dracula (1931) starring Bela Lugosi, and the cult classic Freaks (1932)
- John W. Bubbles, tap dancer, vaudevillian, movie actor, and television performer; performed in the duo "Buck and Bubbles", the first black artists to appear on TV; known as the father of "rhythm tap"; appeared in films A Star Is Born (1937) and Cabin in the Sky (1943); originated the role of the character "Sportin' Life" in George Gershwin's musical Porgy and Bess; first black entertainer to appear on The Tonight Show Starring Johnny Carson
- Lance Burton, stage magician
- Jennifer Carpenter, actress best known as Debra Morgan on Showtime's Dexter
- Harry Carter, silent film actor; appeared in numerous films including the 1921 serial The Hope Diamond Mystery
- Andrew Colville screenwriter; worked on Mad Men, for which he won a Writers Guild of America (WGA) Award
- William Conrad, actor and narrator in radio, film and television from the 1930s through the 1990s; provided the voice for Marshal Matt Dillon in the radio version of Gunsmoke; later starred on television as private detective Frank Cannon in the series Cannon and prosecutor J. L. "Fatman" McCabe in the series Jake and the Fatman
- Iman Crosson, actor, internet celebrity and Obama impersonator who became an example of professional promotion using the Internet
- Tom Cruise, actor born in Syracuse, New York, lived in Louisville until his mid-teens; star of the films Risky Business, Top Gun, A Few Good Men, Jerry Maguire, and the Mission: Impossible film series
- Vadim Dale, Australian reality television personality (Outback Jack); officer with the Louisville Metro Police Department
- Josh Dallas, actor, best known for his roles as Prince Charming/David Nolan in the ABC television series Once Upon a Time and Fandral in the Marvel Comics film adaptation Thor
- Roger Davis, actor in Dark Shadows and Alias Smith and Jones; custom home designer and builder in Los Angeles
- Irene Dunne, actress, starred in 1931 Academy Award Best Picture Cimarron
- Scott Fischer, film producer
- Kelly Fisher, fashion model and ex-fiancée of Dodi Fayed
- Mayme Gehrue, Vaudeville dancer, on Broadway and silent film, also lyricist
- Billy Gilbert, film actor during the 1930s and 1940s; appeared in supporting roles in Laurel & Hardy shorts The Music Box and County Hospital; model and voice for Sneezy in Disney's Snow White
- William Girdler, director and producer of 1970s B-grade films such as Abby, Asylum of Satan and Grizzly
- Petey Greene, television and radio talk show host; two-time Emmy Award-winner
- Griffin Sisters, African-American Vaudeville performers and entrepreneurs
- D. W. Griffith, film director and innovator; credited with originating many camera techniques still commonly used in films today; directed The Birth of a Nation, Intolerance and Way Down East; lived several years in the Brown Hotel, until his death in 1948
- Heather French Henry, Miss America 2000
- John Hensley, television and film actor, regular cast member on the cable TV program Nip/Tuck
- Doan Hoang, movie director, movie producer, series producer for documentary series Turning Point: The Vietnam War and war documentary Oh, Saigon (2007); graduate of Seneca High School (1990) in Louisville
- Audrey Hollander, pornographic actress
- James Horan, television and film actor
- Henry Hull, stage and film actor, star of the 1935 film Werewolf of London
- Ken Jenkins, stage and film actor; co-founder of Actors Theatre of Louisville; Scrubs, Gone in 60 Seconds, I Am Sam
- Tom Kennedy, game show host
- Jennifer Lawrence, film actress, known for her Oscar-winning performance in Silver Linings Playbook and Oscar-nominated performances in Winter's Bone, American Hustle and Joy, as well as Mystique in the X-Men film series and Katniss Everdeen in The Hunger Games film series
- Maggie Lawson, television actress known for her role as Juliet on the detective drama/comedy Psych
- Tom London, bit player and stunt performer in numerous films, primarily westerns; began film career in early silent era; transitioned to TV roles in the early 1950s; listed in Guinness World Records as Hollywood's most prolific actor, with over 600 film appearances
- Desi Lydic, film actress, correspondent on The Daily Show
- William Mapother, film and television actor and entrepreneur; Lost, In the Bedroom
- Victor Mature, actor; My Darling Clementine, Kiss of Death, Samson and Delilah, The Robe
- Alexandra McVickers, film and television actor; co-starred in the TV series Vice Principals (2017) and in the film Action Point (2018)
- Terry Meiners, television and radio personality
- Milton Metz, television and radio personality
- Alexandria Mills, Miss World 2010
- Barbara Milton, theatre actress
- Jack Narz, game show host, television and radio personality
- Alanna Nash, author
- Mary Nolan, actress
- Grady Nutt, humorist and television personality (Hee Haw); lived in Louisville from 1960 until his death in 1982; graduate of Southern Baptist Theological Seminary
- Marty Pollio, stand-up comic and mime; has appeared on The Tonight Show Starring Johnny Carson; has performed his semi-autobiographical one-man show "Prisoners Of Cheese" at The Montreal Fringe Festival
- Wes Ramsey, television and film actor, daytime serial Guiding Light and independent film Latter Days
- Marisha Ray, voice actress and cast member of Critical Role
- Rob Riggle, actor on The Daily Show, The Office, and Saturday Night Live
- Martha Rofheart (née Jones), model, actress and author; born in Louisville 1917, moved to New York City in late 1930s; actress Lynn Fontanne's protege; appeared on Broadway; published six historical novels in 1970s and 1980s
- Diane Sawyer, television journalist, anchor of ABC World News; former co-anchor of ABC's Good Morning America
- Nicole Scherzinger, actress, singer and dancer; lead vocalist of the Pussycat Dolls and host of The Masked Singer
- Kevin M. Sullivan, true crime author, historian
- Gus Van Sant, film director, photographer, musician, and author
- Shannon Tindle, screenwriter, character designer
- Jack Warden, film and television actor; began his career in the early 1950s on TV shows such as Playhouse 90 and Studio One; later appeared in films such as Run Silent, Run Deep, Shampoo and All the President's Men
- Jess Weixler, film and television actress; starred in the film Teeth as well as a plethora of other independent films; graduated in 1999 from Atherton High School; also attended the Walden Theatre Conservatory Program and was in The River City Players acting group and in the Chamber Singers choral group
- Sarah Wright, film and television actress; costarred in the film American Made among other films and TV series; graduated from Seneca High School
- Sean Young, film and television actress; had notable supporting roles in films such as Blade Runner, Stripes and Dune

== Artists and designers ==
- Norris Embry, expressionist painter
- Fontaine Fox, nationally syndicated cartoonist; creator of The Toonerville Trolley (aka Toonerville Folks), one of the most popular strips of the World War I era
- Sam Gilliam, abstract expressionist painter
- Ed Hamilton, sculptor noted for his many public monuments
- Barbara Tyson Mosley (born 1950), mixed media artist
- Momo Pixel, video game designer and advertiser
- Gee Horton, African American Artist
- Don Rosa, illustrator of Scrooge McDuck, Donald Duck and other Disney characters
- Bob Thompson, figurative abstract expressionist painter known for his bold and colorful canvases
- Paul Plaschke, cartoonist for various newspapers including The Courier-Journal; lived in Louisville and New Albany, Indiana
- Patty Prather Thum, painter and art critic
- Enid Yandell, sculptor

== Business ==
- John McDougal Atherton, businessman; former proprietor of Atherton Whiskey
- Peter Lee Atherton, businessman
- Morris Burke Belknap, businessman with Belknap Hardware and Manufacturing Company; Republican nominee for governor of Kentucky
- W. B. Belknap, businessman, founder of Belknap Hardware and Manufacturing Company
- William Richardson Belknap, businessman, President of W. B. Belknap Company
- Ulysses "Junior" Bridgeman, Louisville businessman; basketball star at the University of Louisville; had a long NBA career, mostly with the Milwaukee Bucks; owner of Ebony magazine
- Charles T. Hinde, businessman, railroad executive, founder of the Hotel del Coronado
- Wade Houston, Louisville businessman; player and assistant coach at the University of Louisville; head men's basketball coach at the University of Tennessee
- Boland T. Jones, entrepreneur and executive
- David A. Jones Sr., businessman, philanthropist, co-founder of Humana
- Herbert Marcus, co-founder and CEO of Neiman Marcus
- Carrie Marcus Neiman, co-founder and chair of Neiman Marcus
- Colonel Harland Sanders, founder of Kentucky Fried Chicken; born, raised, and lived in Henryville, Indiana until adulthood
- John Schnatter, founder of Papa John's Pizza; born and raised in Jeffersonville, Indiana until founding his pizza chain
- James Breckenridge Speed, businessman and philanthropist, President of the Louisville Railway Company
- R. C. Tway, local business, agriculture whose Plainview Farms evolved into the Plainview neighborhood of Jeffersontown
- Evan Williams, early Kentucky settler and distiller

== Educators ==
- Abraham Flexner, educator, best known for his role in the 20th-century reform of medical and higher education in the US and Canada
- Susan B. Merwin, educator, publisher, and superintendent of the Kentucky School for the Blind
- William H. Perry Sr. (1860–1946) educator, principal, and physician
- Frank Lunsford Williams (1864–1953), head teacher and educator in St. Louis, Missouri, born in Louisville

== Health care ==
- Horace Signor Brannon (1884–1970), physician
- William DeVries, cardiothoracic surgeon, mainly known for artificial heart transplantation; spent key period of career in Louisville
- Simon Flexner (1863–1946), physician
- Linda Peeno, physician and health insurance whistleblower

== Musicians ==
- Terry Adams, musician, founding member of NRBQ
- Mickey Baker, blues guitarist and singer; had million-seller hit in 1956 with "Love Is Strange" with wife Sylvia
- Odell Brown, jazz organist
- EST Gee, rapper
- Harvey Fuqua, musician, member of The Moonglows (1929–2010), songwriter, record producer, and record label executive
- Eric Genuis, pianist and composer
- Sid Griffin, musician and founder of the bands The Long Ryders and Coal Porters, and author of books on Bob Dylan, Gram Parsons and bluegrass music
- David Grissom, guitarist for Storyville, Joe Ely, The Allman Brothers Band, John Mellencamp
- Gary Guthrie, the original producer of You Don't Bring Me Flowers for Barbra Streisand and Neil Diamond, and recognized as a chief pioneer of the Classic rock radio format
- Lionel Hampton, bandleader and jazz musician
- Jack Harlow, rapper, songwriter, co-founder of Private Garden
- Jonathan Hay, jazz record producer who landed at the top of Billboard charts
- Mildred and Patty Hill, music composers of the song "Happy Birthday to You"
- Telma Hopkins, singer and actress, member of the 1970s pop music trio Tony Orlando and Dawn
- Jim James, born as "Jim Olliges"; musician, lead singer of My Morning Jacket
- Karen Kamensek, orchestral and opera conductor known for her work with Philip Glass, including the Metropolitan Opera production of Akhnaten
- James Kottak, drummer for metal band Scorpions; Yamaha drums endorser and clinician; drummer for Kingdom Come, Warrant and Wild Horses
- Tim Krekel, musician, recording artist, hit songwriter, member of Jimmy Buffett's band
- Paul Laird, Musicologist, professor at University of Kansas
- Patty Loveless, country music singer-songwriter; moved to Louisville at the age of 12
- Sara Martin, blues singer, prominent in the 1920s, recorded with King Oliver and Fats Waller
- Josephine McGill (1877–1919), composer, music historian, and folk song collector
- Brian McMahan, rock musician known for work in Squirrel Bait, Slint, Palace Brothers, The For Carnation, and King Kong
- Will Oldham, songwriter and musician
- Joan Osborne, singer-songwriter
- David Pajo, indie musician known for work in Slint, Tortoise, and Zwan
- Buddy Pepper, songwriter, pianist, and actor, best known as co-writer of Les Paul and Mary Ford song "Vaya Con Dios," the most popular song of 1953
- Wilson Pickett, R&B singer, buried at Evergreen Cemetery
- Artimus Pyle, drummer for the Southern rock band Lynyrd Skynyrd
- Jimmy Raney, jazz guitarist
- Johnny "Hammond" Smith, jazz organ player
- Space Laces, dubstep producer
- Static Major, record producer who gained fame posthumously for featuring in Lil Wayne's "Lollipop"
- Bryson Tiller, singer-songwriter and rapper
- Mary Travers, folk singer with Peter, Paul and Mary
- Alicia Van Buren, composer and poet
- Vory, rapper
- Britt Walford, drummer for Slint
- Hannah Welton, drummer for Prince's backing band, 3rdeyegirl
- Keke Wyatt, R&B singer, most prominent in the late 1990s and early 2000s
- Mia Zapata, murdered singer of the Seattle punk band The Gits

== Politicians, military, civil service, activists ==
- Jerry Abramson, former Louisville Mayor, Lt. Governor of Kentucky and Director of Intergovernmental Affairs for the Obama Administration
- Jon Ackerson, Louisville lawyer who formerly served in both houses of the Kentucky State Legislature
- Robert Anderson, Union Army officer in the Civil War, known for his command of Fort Sumter at the start of the war
- S. Thruston Ballard, politician, philanthropist, and miller, who served as the 33rd Lieutenant Governor of Kentucky
- Anna Simms Banks, first African-American female elected as a delegate at the 7th Congressional District Republican Convention in Kentucky
- Thomas Barlow, member of the United States House of Representatives from Kentucky's 1st congressional district
- J. C. W. Beckham, the 35th Governor of Kentucky and a United States Senator from Kentucky
- Morris B. Belknap, Republican nominee for Governor of Kentucky in 1903
- William Burke Belknap, served two terms as a representative in the Kentucky General Assembly
- Andy Beshear, 63rd Governor of Kentucky, 2019–present; 50th Attorney General of Kentucky (2016–2019)
- Steve Beshear, 61st Governor of Kentucky, 2007–2015; 49th Lieutenant Governor of Kentucky (1983–1987); 43rd Attorney General of Kentucky (1979–1983)
- Charles Booker, Director of Kentucky's Office of Faith-Based Initiatives and Community Involvement, former Kentucky House Representative (2019–2021), and the first African American to be a major party nominee for U.S. Senate in Kentucky
- Marion L. Boswell, Air Force lieutenant general who was assistant vice chief of staff, Headquarters U.S. Air Force, Washington, D.C.; served as chairman and senior Air Force representative, United States Delegation to the Military Staff Committee, United Nations
- Anne Braden, civil rights activist
- Carl Braden, trade unionist, journalist, and civil rights activist
- Louis Brandeis, Justice of the Supreme Court of the United States; namesake of the University of Louisville School of Law
- Alice Barbee Castleman, social leader, philanthropist, and suffragist
- Margaret Weissinger Castleman, suffragist, member of the Kentucky Equal Rights Association and campaigner for the Democratic Party
- George Rogers Clark, preeminent military leader on the northwestern frontier during the American Revolutionary War
- William Clark, co-leader of the Lewis and Clark Expedition, grew up in Louisville and considered it his home
- Richard Frymire, Kentucky State Representative (1962–1964), State Senator (1966–1968), Adjutant General (1971–1977)
- Craig Greenberg (born 1973), businessman, lawyer, and politician; Mayor of Louisville
- William Birch Haldeman, state adjutant general for the Kentucky Army National Guard and part owner of The Courier-Journal and The Louisville Times
- Frank Kerr Hays, flying ace in WWI
- Bob Heleringer, Kentucky State Representative (1980–2003) from the 33rd district
- Alexander Pope Humphrey, judge of chancery court
- James R. Lindsay, U.S. Army brigadier general
- William E. McAnulty, Jr., first African American to serve on the Kentucky Supreme Court
- Mitch McConnell, United States Senator, former U.S. Senate Majority and Minority Leader
- Morgan McGarvey, U.S. representative for Kentucky
- James J. Nash, Medal of Honor recipient for his service during the Spanish–American War
- Carl Nett, Kentucky State Representative (1970–1990)
- Anne Northup, U.S. Representative from Louisville, 1997–2007; member of the Consumer Product Safety Commission; sister of Mary T. Meagher
- Zach Payne, member of the Indiana House of Representatives
- Clarence M. Pendleton, Jr., Chairman of the United States Commission on Civil Rights, from 1981 until his death in 1988; born in Louisville in 1930
- Dean Schamore, member of the Kentucky House of Representatives
- James Speed, lawyer, politician, and professor, the 27th United States Attorney General
- John C. Squires, Medal of Honor recipient for his service during World War II
- Evan B. Stotsenburg, President Pro Tempore of the Indiana Senate; Indiana Attorney General (1915–1917)
- Amelia Tucker, first African-American woman to serve in the Kentucky House of Representatives (1961–1963)
- John Yarmuth, U.S. Representative from Louisville, 2007–2023; founder of the alt-weekly Louisville Eccentric Observer

== Religion ==
- LaVerne Butler, pastor of 9th & O Baptist Church in Louisville, 1969–1988; president of Mid-Continent University, 1988–1997
- Columba Carroll, mother superior of the Sisters of Charity of Nazareth, 1862–1868 and 1874–1878; Irish immigrant
- Edward Porter Humphrey, Presbyterian minister, gave dedicatory address for Cave Hill Cemetery
- Edward William Cornelius Humphrey, lawyer, Presbyterian leader, author, trustee of Centre College and Louisville Presbyterian Theological Seminary
- Adolph S. Moses, rabbi of Adath Israel Temple, 1881–1902
- Eugene Ulrich, theologist and chief editor for interpretation of the Dead Sea Scrolls

== Science ==
- James S. Albus, engineer and Senior NIST Fellow; developer of digital solar aspect sensor, Real-time Control System, Robocrane
- John James Audubon, ornithologist, naturalist and painter; lived in Louisville for two years
- James Gilbert Baker, astronomer and designer of optics systems; president of the Optical Society of America; helped found the Louisville Astronomical Society; born and raised in Louisville; attended the Louisville duPont Manual High School and the University of Louisville
- Dixie Lee Bryant, geologist and educator, born in Louisville in 1862
- Frederick Detweiler, Sociologist, born in Louisville in 1881
- George Devol, inventor of the first industrial robot
- Thomas Alva Edison, inventor and businessman; before fame he lived in Butchertown during 1866–1867 around age 19; a house near where he lived is now a museum in his honor
- Louis B. Flexner, researcher who studied the biochemistry of memory
- Simon Flexner, pioneer of scientific medicine
- Dian Fossey, former nurse at Kosair Children's Hospital; ethologist interested in gorillas
- Edwin Hubble, astronomer, astrophysicist; basketball coach at New Albany High School; namesake of the Hubble Space Telescope; lived in the Highlands
- Thomas MacGillivray Humphrey, economist, historian of economic thought, author, Federal Reserve Bank editor, grandson of Eleanor Silliman Belknap Humphrey
- Rudy Rucker, Computer scientist and science fiction author
- Gary J. Sullivan, Electrical engineer who led the development of the H.264/MPEG-4 AVC and HEVC international standards for video coding; created the DirectX Video Acceleration (DXVA) API/DDI video decoding feature of the Microsoft Windows operating system
- Jacek M. Zurada, professor of electrical engineering at the University of Louisville J. B. Speed School of Engineering, specializing artificial neural networks

== Sports ==
- 2 Tuff Tony, professional wrestler; real name Anthony Borcherding
- Marcelo Acosta, the first swimmer from El Salvador to qualify for the Olympic Games
- Muhammad Ali, multiple heavyweight boxing champion; iconic figure of 20th-century American sports
- Derek L. Anderson, former Kentucky Wildcat basketball player; played on the 1996 NCAA Championship team; former 12-year NBA basketball player drafted by Cleveland in 1997; won an NBA Championship with Miami in 2006
- Chuck Armstrong, former president of the Seattle Mariners
- Richard Ballard, soccer player
- Ralph Beard, attended Louisville Male High School; former Kentucky Wildcat basketball player; played on the 1948 and 1949 NCAA Championship teams; won gold medal with Team USA Basketball in the 1948 Summer Olympics
- Grace Berger, WNBA player for the Indiana Fever
- Rob Bironas, professional football player for Tennessee Titans of the NFL
- Chase Boldt, football player for the NFL Louisville Brecks (1921–23)
- Phil Bond, professional basketball player for the Houston Rockets
- Brian Brohm, football player; former University of Louisville and Buffalo Bills quarterback
- Jeff Brohm, football player; former University of Louisville and NFL quarterback; current head coach at Louisville
- Pete Browning, 19th-century Major League Baseball player; first to use custom bats; uncle of Tod Browning
- Clark Burckle, Member of the 2012 United States Olympic Swim Team, where he placed 6th in the final of the 200 meter breaststroke
- Paul Byrd, professional baseball player for the Boston Red Sox
- David Cohen (born 1984), jockey
- Jim Cornette, professional wrestling manager and promoter
- Bernie Crimmins, the University of Notre Dame football player; head football college football coach at Indiana University; assistant football coach at Notre Dame and Purdue University
- Denny Crum, University of Louisville men's basketball head coach; member of the Naismith Memorial Basketball Hall of Fame as a coach
- Kelsi Worrell Dahlia, Olympic swimmer and 7 time gold medalist
- Hugh Durham, former college basketball coach
- Adam Duvall, Major League Baseball outfielder for the Atlanta Braves
- Jerry Eaves, Basketball player; former University of Louisville and NBA player; head coach for North Carolina A&T
- Jimmy Ellis, heavyweight boxing champion
- Pervis Ellison, basketball player; born in Savannah, Georgia; "Never Nervous Pervis" was the starting center for the University of Louisville for four years, including the 1986 national championship year; second freshman to be named the Most Outstanding Player of the NCAA Final Four; first overall pick in the 1989 NBA Draft by the Sacramento Kings
- Andrew Farrell, soccer player
- Jazzmarr Ferguson, professional basketball player who last played for Vanoli Cremona of the Lega Basket Serie A
- Salem Ford, halfback for University of Louisville (1914–16) and the NFL Louisville Brecks (1922–23)
- Brooke Forde, Olympic swimmer and silver medallist
- Chris Gabehart, NASCAR crew chief and former stock car racing driver
- Gertrude Ganote, All-American Girls Professional Baseball League player, 1944–1945
- Darrell Griffith, basketball player; won 1980 NCAA basketball championship and John R. Wooden Award, 1980 NCAA basketball tournament Most Outstanding Player, 1981 NBA Rookie of the Year Award; played 11 seasons with the Utah Jazz; nicknamed "Dr. Dunkenstein" for aerial exploits
- Scott Harrington, racing driver; Indianapolis 500 veteran and Indy Car Rookie of the Year
- Marvin Hart, heavyweight boxing champion
- Paul Hornung, football player with the National Football League's Green Bay Packers and Notre Dame Fighting Irish; member of the Pro Football Hall of Fame
- Allan Houston, NBA player, New York Knicks; son of Wade Houston
- Matt Hughes, Canadian steeplechase runner and Olympian
- Anna May Hutchison, All-American Girls Professional Baseball League player, 1944–1949
- Jessica Javelet, Olympian and multi-sport athlete
- Joe Jacoby, Football player for the Washington Redskins
- Wesley Korir, Kenyan marathoner; winner of the 2012 Boston Marathon; member of the National Assembly of Kenya; ran track at, and graduated from, the University of Louisville; before his election to the National Assembly, he kept a home in Louisville
- Stefan LeFors, quarterback for University of Louisville, and in the NFL and CFL; head football coach for the high school team of the Christian Academy of Louisville
- Sarah Logan, professional wrestler
- Joe E. Martin, Olympic boxing coach who trained World Heavyweight Champions Muhammad Ali and Jimmy Ellis, and several National Golden Gloves champions
- Oksana Masters, paralympic medalist in rowing and cross-country skiing; graduate of Atherton High School
- A'dia Mathies, WNBA player for Los Angeles Sparks
- Mary T. Meagher, Olympic gold medalist and multiple world record holder in swimming
- Angel McCoughtry, Olympic gold medalist and professional WNBA basketball player
- Bobby Nichols, professional golfer, known for winning the 1964 PGA Championship, one of the Majors in men's golf
- Jimmy Osting, Major League Baseball player
- Bo Otto, football player for the NFL Louisville Brecks (1922–23)
- Scott Padgett, former Kentucky Wildcat basketball player, played on the 1996 and 1998 NCAA Championship teams; former 7-year NBA basketball player drafted by Utah in 1998; now head men's basketball coach at Samford University
- Greg Page, heavyweight boxing champion
- Bubba Paris, offensive tackle for the 1982 Super Bowl-winning San Francisco 49ers; graduate of Louisville's DeSales High School
- Devante Parker, former University of Louisville Football Wide Receiver; currently plays in the NFL for the Miami Dolphins
- Fred Pfeffer, Major League Baseball player
- Rick Pitino, men's basketball coach at St. John's University; former head coach at the University of Louisville, Iona University, Providence College, Boston University, the University of Kentucky and the Boston Celtics
- John Quast, NFL player for the Louisville Brecks
- Steve Raible, NFL player for the Seattle Seahawks; co-anchor of local KIRO News in Seattle
- Jon Rauch, professional baseball player for the Arizona Diamondbacks
- Pee Wee Reese, Hall of Fame shortstop for the Brooklyn and Los Angeles Dodgers; noted for his acceptance of Jackie Robinson when the latter broke baseball's color line
- Ben Rhodes, NASCAR Craftsman Truck Series driver
- Desmond Ridder, quarterback for the Atlanta Falcons
- Rajon Rondo, former Kentucky Wildcat basketball player; won an NBA Championship with the Boston Celtics in 2008, and the Los Angeles Lakers in 2020; participated in several NBA All-Star games
- D'Angelo Russell, NBA player for the Brooklyn Nets
- Phil Simms, quarterback for the NFL's New York Giants; television sportscaster
- Donta Smith, professional basketball player for Maccabi Haifa, 2014 Israeli Basketball Premier League MVP
- Will Smith, professional baseball player for the Los Angeles Dodgers of Major League Baseball
- Rudell Stitch, welterweight boxer
- Danny Sullivan, race car driver and winner of the 1985 Indianapolis 500
- Grigoriy Tarasevich, olympic swimmer known for his meldonium doping scandal
- Justin Thomas, golf player, major winner and former World Number One
- Dan Uggla, former professional baseball infielder in Major League Baseball
- Johnny Unitas, quarterback at University of Louisville; went on to a Hall of Fame career, mainly with the Baltimore Colts
- Wes Unseld, basketball player and coach in the NBA; member of the Naismith Memorial Basketball Hall of Fame as a player
- Jimmy Van Dyke, football player for the NFL Louisville Brecks (1921–23)
- Jeff Walz, women's basketball coach at the University of Louisville
- George Wanless, football player for the NFL Louisville Brecks (1922–23)
- Brent Weedman, mixed martial artist
- Barb Weinberg, field hockey coach
- Todd Wellemeyer, Major League Baseball player, Chicago Cubs, Florida Marlins, Kansas City Royals, St. Louis Cardinals
- Gus Weyhing, MLB pitcher for 11 teams
- Albert Wolff, French-born American Olympic fencer
- Will Wolford, Pro Bowl NFL offensive lineman, played for Pittsburgh Steelers, Buffalo Bills, and Indianapolis Colts; head football coach at his alma mater of St. Xavier High School; radio color analyst for the Indianapolis Colts
- Logan Wyatt, professional baseball first baseman in the San Francisco Giants organization
- Joshua Wynder, soccer player
- Fuzzy Zoeller, professional golfer; winner of two major championships (1979 Masters, 1984 U.S. Open); born, raised, and lives on the Indiana side of the metropolitan area in Floyd County

== Writers, publishers, journalists ==
- Cynthia Arrieu-King, poet; raised in Louisville
- Barry Bingham Jr., publisher of The Courier-Journal
- Barry Bingham Sr., publisher of The Courier-Journal and The Louisville Times; led both papers to national prominence
- Emily Lucas Blackall, writer; philanthropist
- Jon Bois, writer
- Tracy Clayton, writer and co-host of BuzzFeed's podcast Another Round
- Joe Creason, journalist for The Courier-Journal, known for his columns on the everyday lives of Kentuckians
- Reuben T. Durrett, lawyer, jurist, linguist, poet, editor, journalist, history writer, and Kentucky bibliographer; a founder of the Louisville Free Public Library
- Pat Forde, sportswriter; reporter and columnist for The Courier-Journal, ESPN.com, and Yahoo! Sports
- C. W. Grafton, author, crime novelist
- Sue Grafton, writer
- Walter Newman Haldeman, founder and publisher, Louisville Courier-Journal; founder of Naples, Florida; Major League Baseball owner of Louisville Grays
- Anna J. Hamilton, educator, journalist, writer, and editor; one of the editors for Kentucky on "A Woman of the Century", helped edit the National Encyclopedia of America
- Agnes Leonard Hill, journalist, author, poet, newspaper founder/publisher, evangelist, social reformer
- Lewis Craig Humphrey, editor of Louisville newspapers The Evening Post and The Herald-Post
- Annie Laurie Wilson James, journalist
- Nelly Nichol Marshall, author
- George Madden Martin (pen name of Mrs. Attwood R. Martin), writer
- Jane Mayhall, poet
- Beverle Graves Myers, author of mystery novels and short stories
- Marsha Norman, playwright; won the 1983 Pulitzer Prize for Drama
- ZZ Packer, writer; born in Chicago; lived in Louisville in her teens and graduated from Seneca High School in 1990
- Bill Plaschke, Los Angeles sports columnist, panelist on ESPN's Around the Horn
- George Dennison Prentice, newspaper editor and journalist for the Louisville Journal
- Scott Ritcher, magazine publisher of K Composite Magazine, musician
- Hunter S. Thompson, journalist and author, long-time contributing writer for Rolling Stone magazine
- Henry Watterson, founder of The Courier-Journal; namesake of the Henry Watterson Expressway

== Other ==
- Joanna Banks, book collector
- William Burke Belknap, philanthropist, breeder of American saddlebred horses, owner of Land O' Goshen Farms
- Squire Boone, frontiersman and brother of Daniel Boone
- Kathy Cary, chef and seven-time James Beard Award nominee
- Jennie Casseday, philanthropist
- Laura Miller Derry, attorney, first woman to defend a court-martial case brought by the United States Army
- Bob Edwards, broadcaster for National Public Radio
- Lillian Haydon Childress Hall, first professionally trained African American librarian in Indiana
- Increase A. Lapham, surveyor, naturalist, helped found the U.S. Weather Bureau
- Frank Neuhauser, winner of the first National Spelling Bee, held in 1925
- Jeffrey Wigand, 60 Minutes tobacco industry whistleblower
- York, William Clark's manservant and participant in Lewis and Clark Expedition
- John Ziegler, radio talk show host

== See also ==
- List of University of Louisville people
- List of people from Kentucky
- List of people from Lexington, Kentucky
