= Seneca High School MCA =

Coordinates: 38°12′27.82″N 85°39′18.91″W

Seneca High School

Location
- 3510 Goldsmith Lane; Louisville, Kentucky 40220; United States

Information
- Type: Public Secondary
- Established: 1957
- School district: Jefferson County Public Schools
- Teaching staff: 88.75 (FTE)
- Grades: 9–12
- Enrollment: 1,317 (2023–2024)
- Student to teacher ratio: 14.84
- Campus: Urban
- Color
- Team name: RedHawks
- Fight song: Seneca Forever
- Website: Seneca High School

Seneca High School MCA (Magnet Career Academy) is a Louisville, Kentucky, USA, public school. It is located at 3510 Goldsmith Lane, Louisville, Kentucky 40220, in the Hikes Point neighborhood and is part of Jefferson County Public Schools. Seneca is one of 15 Academies of Louisville schools in JCPS.

== Academics ==
Seneca is a public senior high school with a full complement of academics including learning and academic disabilities education and English as a Second Language. Seneca has an Honors program, an Advanced Placement program, a Competitive Music Program, an Urban AgriScience magnet program, and It previously had a JROTC program, which has since been discontinued. A professional career theme called Creating Our Global Community offers courses in human services, education, and international studies. The foreign languages offered are French, Latin, Japanese, German, Spanish and Chinese. Students are now required to follow a dress code, although uniform is no longer enforced.

== Athletics ==
- Baseball
- Basketball (boys and girls)
- Bowling
- Cross Country
- E-Sports
- Field Hockey
- Football
- Golf (boys and girls)
- Soccer (boys and girls)
- Softball
- Tennis (boys and girls)
- Volleyball (girls)
- Wrestling
- Archery

== Administrators ==
- Executive Principal: Michael Guy
- Academy Principal: Matt Foster
- Academy Principal: Noah Klein
- Academy Principal: Hans Probst
- Academy Principal: Rebecca Merkel

== Notable alumni ==
- Jerry Abramson – Louisville, Kentucky mayor and Kentucky lieutenant governor. (1964)
- Cyb (Priscilla) & Patricia Barnstable – Identical twin actresses who appeared as the Doublemint Twins in commercials for Wrigley chewing gum, portrayed Betty 1 and Betty 2 in the short lived 1970s television series, Quark, and co-host the Barnstable Brown Kentucky Derby Party, a celebrity charity event. (1969)
- J. J. Eubanks (born 1968) – basketball player, scored 101 points during an Israeli league game, was the top scorer in the 1994-95 Israel Basketball Premier League. (1985)
- Doan Hoang – Director of Oh, Saigon, award-winning documentary about her family's separation during the fall of Saigon and her attempt to reunite them. (1990)
- ZZ Packer – short-fiction writer and author of Drinking Coffee Elsewhere featured on the Today Show Book Club. (1990)
- Mike Redd – Basketball player. All-State three years and Kentucky Mr. Basketball in 1963 when Seneca won the Kentucky state championship. Led Kentucky Wesleyan to third in the 1964 NCAA Division II men's basketball tournament. Drafted in 1967 by the Boston Celtics. Won the AAU Men's National Basketball Championship in 1969 and 1970 with the U.S. Armed Forces All-Stars. Elected to the Kentucky High School Athletic Association Hall of Fame in 1999. (1963)
- Diane Sawyer – Television journalist for ABC News (1963)
- Kevin M. Sullivan (author) - true crime author, historian
- Wes Unseld – NBA basketball player for the Baltimore/Washington Bullets elected to the Basketball Hall of Fame in 1988. Led Seneca High School to two Kentucky state championships in 1963 and 1964. His 88 rebounds in the 1964 tournament, and 72 rebounds in the 1963 tourney, rank as the two top tournament marks in that category. As a senior he was named Kentucky Mr. Basketball. Elected to Kentucky High School Athletic Association Hall of Fame in 1989. (1964)
- Garry Williams – Offensive lineman for the NFL Carolina Panthers and University of Kentucky. (2004)

== See also ==
- Public schools in Louisville, Kentucky
