= Tway =

Tway may refer to:

== People ==
- Bob Tway (born 1959), American golfer
- Kevin Tway (born 1988), American golfer
- R. C. Tway (1881–1964), American businessman and politician

== Places ==
- Tway, Saskatchewan, Canada, a hamlet
- Tway, Kentucky, U.S., an unincorporated community

== See also ==
- Tway Ma Shaung (born 1982), retired Burmese lethwei fighter (boxer)
- A Tway, a 1962 Burmese black-and-white drama film
- T'way Air, a South Korean low-cost airline
- Liverpool–Parramatta T-way, a rapid bus system in the western suburbs of Sydney
- North-West T-way, a rapid bus system in the north-western suburbs of Sydney
