= RASU =

RASU or Rasu may refer to:

- Joshua Rasu, a Vanuatuan cricketer
- Monte Rasu, a mountain in Sardinia, Italy
- Perumal Rasu, an Indian poet
- Rangoon Arts and Sciences University, former name of University of Yangon, Myanmar
- Rasu Jilani
- Rasu Madhuravan, a Tamil film director
