= Riverport =

Riverport may refer to:

- Inland port
- Riverport, Nova Scotia
- Jefferson Riverport International
- Riverport Amphitheater
  - Riverport riot
