= Zzyw =

New media art duo based in New York

- Education: Interactive Telecommunication Program, New York University
- Known for: New Media Art, Computational Art
- Notable work: ThingThingThing, Computational Haze
- Website: https://www.zzyw.org/

zzyw is a New York-based New media art and research duo, founded in 2013 by Zhenzhen Qi and Yang Wang. The duo is known for creating software applications, installations, and texts that examine the cultural, political, and educational impacts of computation. Since 2014, zzyw has collaborated with various art institutions, including the New Museum, Asia Art Archive, and Power Station of Art, to develop educational initiatives that examine the potential of computation as a mode of expression and speculation. Zzyw's works have been exhibited in arts and culture institutions worldwide, including the Power Station of Art, Rhizome (organization) of the New Museum. Zzyw has made scholarly contributions to the field of new media art and simulation through presentations and publications. Notable events in which zzyw has participated include the Art School Critique 2.0 Symposium and Museum 2050's 2020 Annual Symposium.

== Background ==
Zhenzhen Qi and Yang Wang met while studying at the Interactive Telecommunication Program (ITP) at New York University. Qi holds a BS in Applied mathematics from the University of California, Berkeley, and an MPS from ITP at New York University. She is currently a Doctor of Education candidate at Teachers College, Columbia University. Wang holds a BA in Artistic design from the University of Science and Technology Beijing (USTB), and an MPS from ITP at New York University

== Teaching ==
Both members of the zzyw duo serve as adjunct professors at various colleges and universities. As of April 2023, they teach simulation and game during the spring semester at Cooper Union. Zhenzhen Qi, one half of the duo, has been actively involved in college-level teaching since 2014. Her experience includes instructing courses in game design, simulation, new media art, and theory at institutions as New York University Tisch School of the Arts, Teachers College, Columbia University, Baruch College, and Guangzhou Academy of Fine Arts, among others.

== Notable works ==
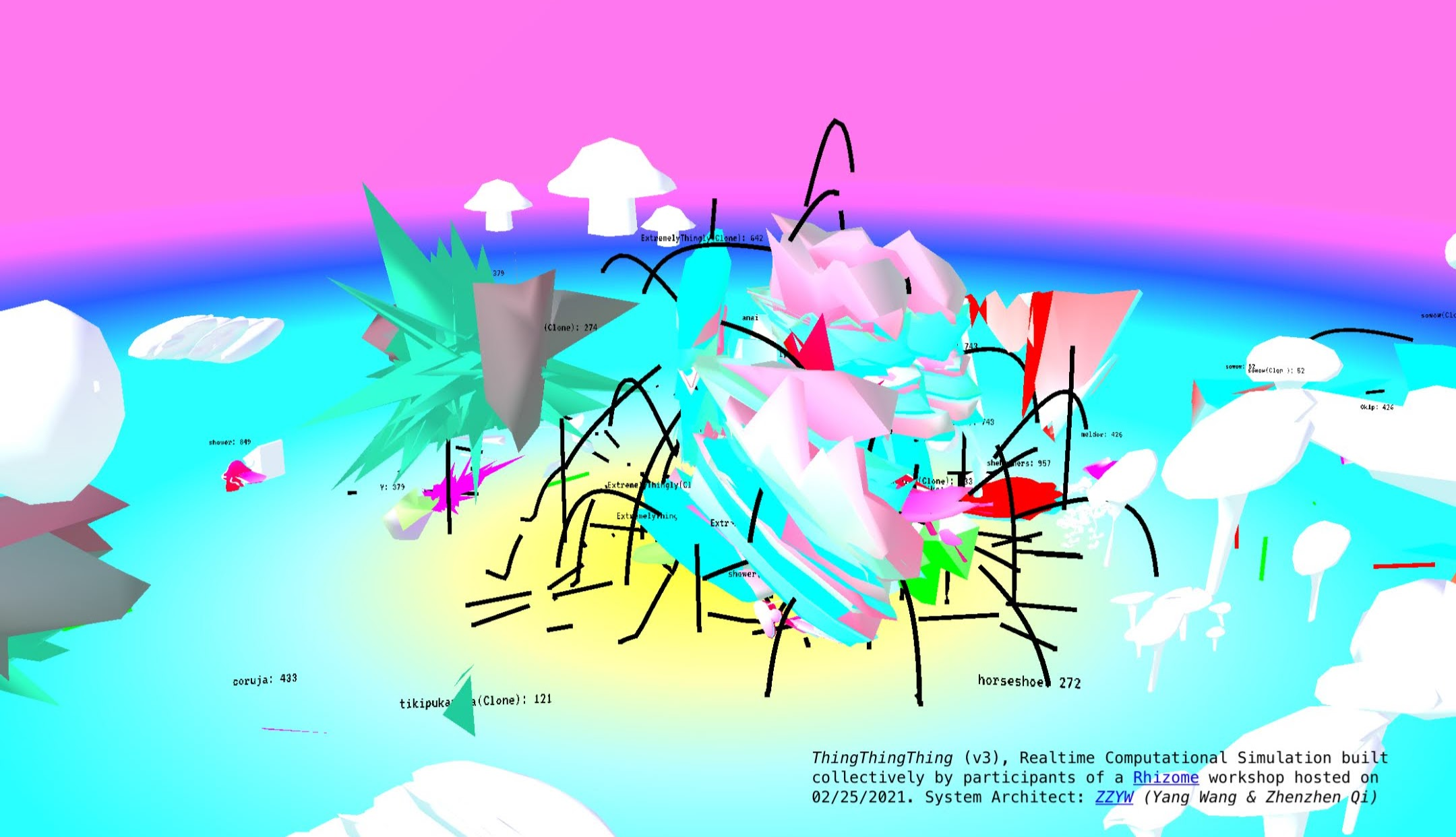
A still render from a simulation of ThingThingThing. This particular render was generated from a workshop hosted by Rhizome on February 25th, 2021.

=== ThingThingThing ===
"ThingThingThing" (2019) is a computational system for collaborative worlding, resulting in a live simulation where user-generated entities interact in an ever-evolving three-dimensional world. The work was included in the "World on a Wire" exhibition at Hyundai Motor Studio Beijing and online at worldonawire.net. In collaboration with various institutions, zzyw has conducted workshops that engage participants in collective worlding projects, designing their algorithmic entities, or "Things," to help populate "ThingThingThing." These workshops explore ideas from systems theory that can be applied to computational, social, and biological phenomena, such as Tulip Mania and the human body. The resulting simulations are accessible online for everyone.

=== LENNA ===
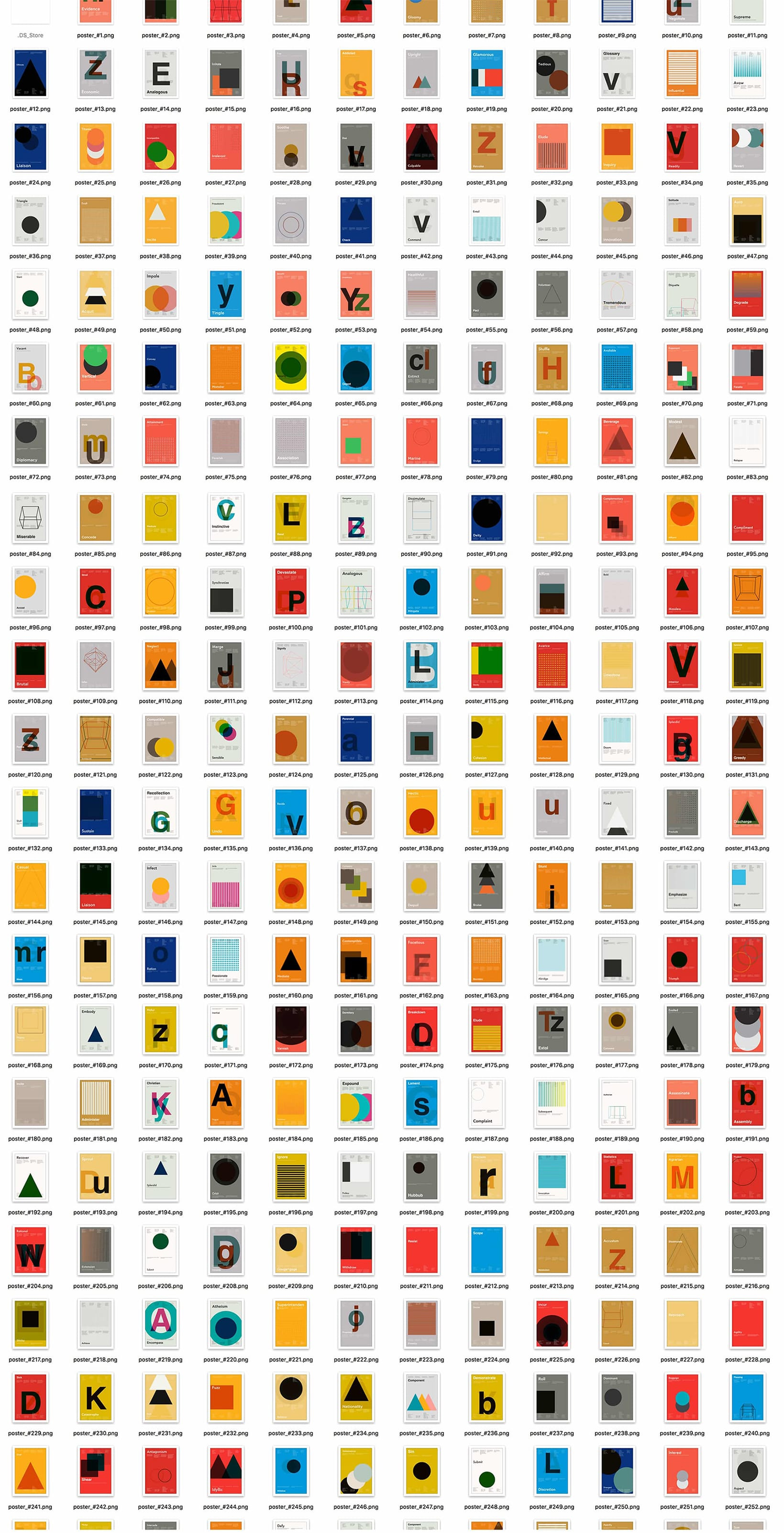
A screenshot of a file directory containing posters generated by the algorithm of LENNA, a procedural generative system that automates the graphic design process.

LENNA (2015) is a system designed to autonomously create graphic design using a combination of software and hardware components, including a custom algorithm written in Java, a computer, a plotter printer, and an LED monitor. Adhering to the International Typographic Style, LENNA automates the entire graphic design process, from ideation to printout. The name "LENNA" references the widely-used Lenna image, a standard test image in the field of image processing and digital imaging.

== Recognition ==
zzyw has received awards and residencies in various institutions, including:

- Finalist for the 5th VH Award from Hyundai Artlab, 2022
- Shortlisted for the Lumen Prize in the Still Image category, 2021
- Grantee of Brooklyn Arts Fund, Brooklyn Arts Council, 2020.
- Technology Residency, Pioneer Works, 2020 Fall.
- Year 6 Member in NEW INC at the New Museum.
- Laboratory Residency in Spokane, Washington, 2015
