= Green Wix Unthank =

American judge

Senior Judge of the United States District Court for the Eastern District of Kentucky
- In office June 14, 1988 – June 25, 2013

Judge of the United States District Court for the Eastern District of Kentucky
- In office June 18, 1980 – June 14, 1988
- Appointed by: Jimmy Carter
- Preceded by: Seat established by 92 Stat. 1629
- Succeeded by: Seat abolished

Attorney of the 26th Judicial District of Kentucky
- In office 1970–1980

Assistant United States Attorney for the Eastern District of Kentucky
- In office 1966–1969

Judge of the Harlan County Court
- In office 1951–1958

Personal details
- Born: Green Wix Unthank; June 14, 1923 Tway, Kentucky
- Died: June 25, 2013 (aged 90) Harlan, Kentucky
- Resting place: Wix Howard Cemetery, Loyall, Kentucky
- Education: University of Miami School of Law (JD)
- Nickname: Wix

Military service
- Allegiance: United States
- Branch/service: United States Army
- Years of service: 1940–1945
- Unit: 509th Infantry Regiment
- Battles/wars: World War II
- Awards: Bronze Star Medal; Purple Heart

Green Wix Unthank (June 14, 1923 – June 25, 2013) was an American attorney and United States district judge of the United States District Court for the Eastern District of Kentucky, from 1980 to 1988, when he took senior status. A veteran of World War II, he went to college and to law school after the war. He served as a judge of Harlan County Court, had a private practice for several years, and also served as an Assistant United States Attorney for the Eastern District of Kentucky.

== Education and career ==
Unthank was born on June 14, 1923 in Tway, Kentucky, an unincorporated community in Harlan County. He was the son of Green W. Unthank and Estelle (née Howard) Unthank, who were both teachers in the Harlan County public school system.

After graduating from Loyall High School in 1940, Unthank enlisted in the United States Army, serving during World War II as a paratrooper in the 509th Infantry Regiment. He was awarded the Bronze Star Medal and a Purple Heart, the latter due to injuries sustained in 1943 from a German hand grenade while in enemy territory. He was honorably discharged in 1945.

After the war, Unthank completed his undergraduate degree and law school. He earned a Juris Doctor from the University of Miami School of Law in 1950. He served as a judge of the Harlan County Court in Kentucky from 1951 to 1958, where he used the name G. Wix Unthank professionally. After this tenure, he entered private law practice.

He served as an Assistant United States Attorney for the Eastern District of Kentucky from 1966 to 1969. He was appointed as Commonwealth's Attorney of the 26th Judicial District of Kentucky, serving from 1979 to 1980.

== Federal judicial service ==
On December 19, 1979, Unthank was nominated by President Jimmy Carter to a new seat on the United States District Court for the Eastern District of Kentucky, created by 92 Stat. 1629. He was confirmed by the United States Senate on June 18, 1980, and received his commission the same day.

President Ronald Reagan involuntarily certified Unthank as disabled on November 30, 1987, pursuant to 71 Stat. 586 which entitled the President to appoint an additional judge for the court and provided that no successor to the judge certified as disabled be appointed. Karl Spillman Forester was appointed to the additional judgeship. Pursuant to the certification, Unthank assumed senior status on June 14, 1988, but continued to maintain a substantial caseload.

== Death ==
Unthank died on June 25, 2013, in Harlan, Kentucky at the age of 90. He was survived by his wife, Marilyn Ward Unthank.

== Honors and legacy ==
On August 14, 2017, the Green Wix Unthank Memorial Bridge was dedicated in his honor. It crosses the Clover Fork River in Harlan County, Kentucky.

== Sources ==
Legal offices
| Preceded by Seat established by 92 Stat. 1629 | Judge of the United States District Court for the Eastern District of Kentucky; 1980–1988 | Succeeded by Seat abolished |
