= Brooklyn Arts Council =

Arts organization in New York City

Brooklyn Arts Council (BAC) is a Brooklyn, NY-based arts non-profit that began in 1966 and has supported Brooklyn artists through grants, festivals, arts education, cultural heritage preservation, professional development, on-demand programming, and community events. The organization also has an arts consultancy and wellness studio. BAC is one of the 5 New York City arts councils.

== Organizational events ==
Brooklyn Arts Council has hosted an annual Spring Gala, the Brooklyn Arts Council Film and Video Festival, and Folk Feet dance workshops.

== History and leadership ==
Brooklyn Arts Council began in 1966 as the Brooklyn Arts and Cultural Association in Flatbush, Brooklyn, NY. The organization began showcases of Brooklyn artists and community members.

Brooklyn Arts Council's first executive director was Charlene Victor (1966-1999), the second was Ella Weiss (1999-2015), the third was Charlotte Cohen (2015-2023), and the current executive director is Rasu Jilani (2023-to current).

== Grants organization ==
According to executive director Rasu Jilani, “Most of the artists that are funded are first-time artists, early-stage artists and mid-career artists,. Almost 33 percent of the grantees are getting their first grant in the arts." The organization gives grants to Brooklyn artists and arts organizations. In 2023, the organization gave $592,000 to Brooklyn-based 136 projects.

== Past grantees and awardees ==
Past grantees and affiliates include filmmakers Spike Lee, Danny DeVito, 1980 Academy Award (Best Documentary) winner, Ira Wohl, documentary filmmaker Doan Hoang, arts organizations: Brighton Ballet Theater Co. Inc., the Brooklyn Classical Guitar Society, Fulton Art Fair, Maaa Theater, NYC Radio Live, and Steps Theater & Production Company
