= Garry Williams (gridiron football) =

American football player (born 1986)

No. 65
- Position: Offensive tackle

Personal information
- Born: August 20, 1986 (age 40); Atlanta, Georgia, U.S.
- Listed height: 6 ft 3 in (1.91 m)
- Listed weight: 315 lb (143 kg)

Career information
- High school: Louisville (KY) Seneca
- College: Kentucky
- NFL draft: 2009: undrafted

Career history
- Carolina Panthers (2009–2014); Calgary Stampeders (2015); Chicago Bears (2016)*
- * Offseason or practice squad member only

Awards and highlights
- 2× Second-team All-SEC (2007, 2008)

Career NFL statistics
- Games played: 41
- Games started: 21
- Fumble recoveries: 1
- Stats at Pro Football Reference
- Stats at CFL.ca (archive)

Garry Williams (born August 20, 1986) is an American former professional football player who was an offensive tackle for the Carolina Panthers of the National Football League (NFL). He attended the University of Kentucky, where he played college football for the Wildcats while studying community communications and leadership development.

Williams signed the Panthers as an undrafted free agent in 2009. He dealt with repeated injuries while playing for the Panthers. His injuries prevented him from being a consistent starter despite multiple opportunities. In 2012, Williams played a complete season and contributed to a team record 29 first downs in a single game.

== Early life ==
Williams played high school football at Seneca High School MCA for the Red Hawks, where he started at the defensive tackle position as a freshman before switching to offensive tackle. The Red Hawks competed in the playoffs each year that Williams played. In his senior year, he was named a 2003 first-team all-state player by the Associated Press and the Courier-Journal after leading his team to a 10–2 record and the second round of state playoffs. The Red Hawks were also ranked first in the state for the first time in school history that season. Williams also played track and field at Seneca, and he was ranked second in the state at shot put in 2003.

== College career ==
In early 2004, Williams committed to play football at the University of Kentucky, but he did not join the team that season. He later recommitted to Kentucky in 2005 and enrolled that year. In the 2005 season, Williams played in five games before starting in the final three matches of the season at left tackle. He started 12 games in his sophomore year and was named the Most Outstanding Offensive Lineman by the team. In early 2007, Williams was indefinitely suspended from the Wildcats for academic reasons, but his suspension was later lifted prior to the start of the season.

In 2007, Williams started in all 13 games and was named a second-team All-SEC player. The Wildcats offense also broke the team record for most points scored in a season with 475 points in Williams' junior year. Williams was named the SEC's offensive lineman of the week for his play against the Florida Atlantic Owls on September 29. As a senior, Williams was again named to the All-SEC second-team after starting in 11 games. He was also named the team's most outstanding offensive lineman after allowing only a single sack the entire season. A knee injury caused Williams to miss two games as a senior. He finished his career at Kentucky with 45 games played and 39 starts.

== Professional career ==
=== Carolina Panthers ===
Williams was eligible for the 2009 NFL draft but went undrafted. He was later signed by the Carolina Panthers as a free agent, and was the only undrafted rookie to make the active roster of the Panthers following training camp. Williams made his NFL debut in Week 11 of his rookie season against the Miami Dolphins. He went on to play in seven games in 2009, where he was utilized mostly on special teams. In 2010, Williams played in all 16 regular season games, while starting in 11. He started for the first time against the San Francisco 49ers in Week 7, and remained a starter for the rest of the season. In Carolina's final preseason game of 2011, Williams suffered a broken ankle, causing him to miss the entire season. Head coach Ron Rivera later said the Panthers had planned on Williams taking on the role of a starter prior to his injury.

In 2012, Williams played in all 16 games and started in nine. In Week 15 against the San Diego Chargers, Williams started and contributed to the Panthers breaking a team record with 29 first downs. Williams also started on the offensive line that helped reach 273 rushing yards and 530 total offensive yards in Week 17 against the New Orleans Saints, both the second highest values in team history. Prior to the 2013 season, the Panthers released right guard Geoff Hangartner and announced Williams as the likely starter. He started against the Seattle Seahawks in the regular season opener, but was injured and left the game. He was later diagnosed with a torn ACL and MCL in his left knee, ending his season. Williams played in the 2014 season opener against the Tampa Bay Buccaneers, but left practice later that week with coaches citing a sore hip. He was later placed on injured reserve with a back injury, ending his season. Williams became a free agent in 2015 and the Panthers did not resign him.

=== Calgary Stampeders ===
The Calgary Stampeders signed Williams as an international free agent on May 28, 2015. Williams made the Stampeders' active roster following preseason and made his CFL debut on July 18 against the Winnipeg Blue Bombers. He started three games at left tackle before being forced to leave the August 1 game against the Montreal Alouettes with an arm injury. After Williams reportedly had X-rays of his elbow taken, he was diagnosed with a hyperextended right elbow. He suffered multiple injuries during the rest of the regular season, causing him to sit out several games. He returned in time to play in both playoff games for Calgary.

=== Chicago Bears ===
Williams signed with the Chicago Bears on August 4, 2016. On September 2, he was released by the team.

== Personal life ==
Williams was born in Atlanta, Georgia to Garry Williams Sr. and Angela Williams. While playing college football and studying public service and leadership at the University of Kentucky, he was involved in community service. He helped with a "Breakfast with Santa" event at the University of Kentucky Children's Hospital and rang bells to collect donations for the Salvation Army.
