= Susan B. Merwin =

American educator

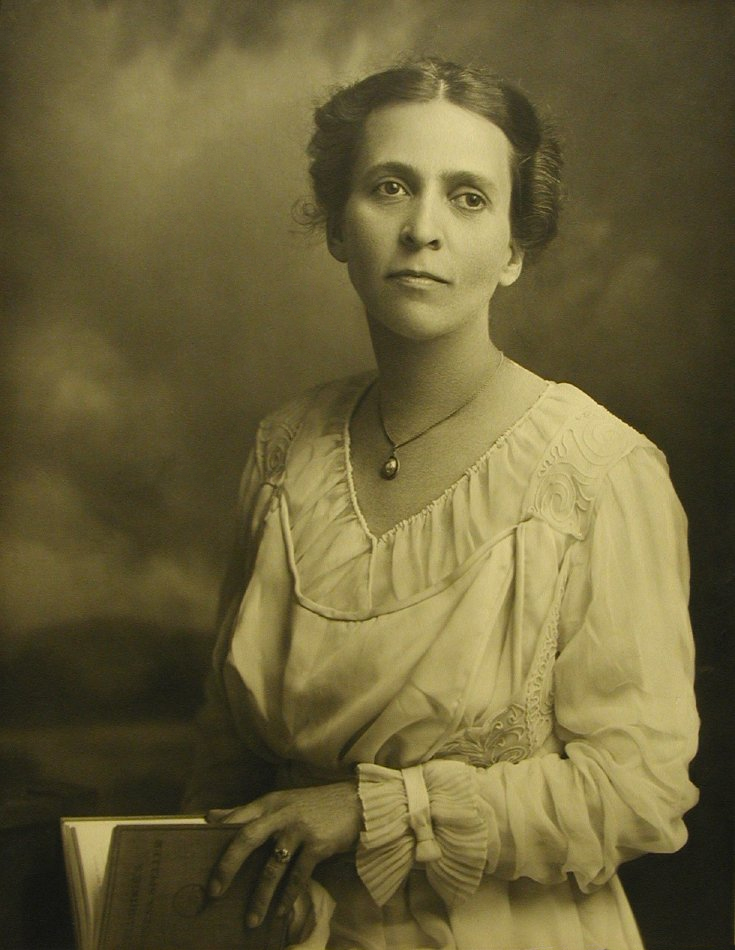
- Susan B. Merwin, photographed in 1916; photo appeared with her 1923 obituary in the Outlook for the Blind magazine.
- Born: Susan Buckingham Merwin; November 21, 1874; Louisville, Kentucky, U.S.
- Died: May 6, 1923 (aged 48); Louisville, Kentucky, U.S.
- Occupations: Educator, publisher, superintendent
- Years active: 1895-1923
- Known for: Superintendent of the Kentucky School for the Blind and of the American Printing House for the Blind

Susan Buckingham Merwin (November 21, 1874 – May 6, 1923) was an American educator, publisher, and superintendent of the Kentucky School for the Blind.

== Early life ==
Merwin was born in Louisville, Kentucky, one of the five children of Samuel Miles Merwin and Mary Irvine Merwin. Her father was from Connecticut, and her mother was from Pennsylvania. She attended Girls' High School in Louisville, and trained in the city's normal school to become a teacher.

== Career ==
Merwin taught at the Kentucky School for the Blind beginning in 1895, and was superintendent of the school from 1913 to her death in 1923. She was the second woman in the United States to become superintendent of a state school for the blind. She started Boy Scout and Girl Scout troops at the school, and wrote articles about the school's work. She was elected vice-president of the American Association of Instructors of the Blind in 1915. She also served as president of the Louisville Council of Social Workers.

Beginning in 1919, Merwin was also secretary of the American Printing House for the Blind, and associate editor of the national magazine Outlook for the Blind. She served on the Commission on Uniform Type for the Blind. She testified before a Congressional committee in 1920, explaining the work of the American Printing House for the Blind, and its need for federal funding.

== Personal life ==
Merwin died in 1923, from pneumonia and influenza, aged 48 years, in Louisville.
