= Rasu Jilani =

American cultural producer and community organizer

Rasu Jilani is an American cultural producer, arts advocate, and community organizer based in Brooklyn, New York City. As of 2023, he serves as the Executive Director of the Brooklyn Arts Council. His work focuses on the intersection of art, community engagement, and social justice, including public exhibitions, lectures, dialogues, and festivals.

== Early influences ==
Jilani has cited the 1980s hip-hop scene in New York City and racial justice movements as formative influences on his work. He credits the video for Public Enemy’s "Fight the Power" and the broader ethos of hip-hop for shaping his interest in political and cultural expression.

== Career ==
Before joining the Brooklyn Arts Council, Jilani held various roles in arts and nonprofit organizations. From 2016 to 2019, he was Director of Recruiting and Community Engagement at NEW INC, the cultural incubator at the New Museum. He previously worked at MAPP International Productions (2013–2016) as Director of Community Programs, and served as the Cultural Network Curator at the Lambent Foundation.

In 2015, he was an artist-in-residence with The Laundromat Project, where he created "Griots in the Stuy," a storytelling project exploring local narratives and the impact of gentrification in Bedford–Stuyvesant, Brooklyn.

From 2011 to 2013, Jilani was a Senior Fellow in Arts, Culture, and Sustainability at the Pratt Center for Community Development, affiliated with the Pratt Institute. There, he partnered with local organizations to implement arts-based strategies for sustainable urban development.

He is also a co-founder of the Coup d'état Art Collective, a Brooklyn-based group that produces socially engaged art events throughout New York City.

== Exhibitions ==
Jilani has curated and contributed to a number of exhibitions and art events, including:

Date	Exhibition	Venue
April 2012	Amplify Action: Sustainability Through the Arts	Skylight Gallery, Bedford-Stuyvesant Restoration Corporation
November 2009	Live To Change Something Through Art	Skylight Gallery, Bedford-Stuyvesant Restoration Corporation
June 2009	We’ve Gotta Have It!: Art Inspired by Spike Lee	Salena Gallery, Long Island University
November 2008	Coup d'état Art Show	SlyArt & Robot City
June 2007	Afropunk Festival Mural	Brooklyn Academy of Music

== Selected projects ==
- Brooklyn Greens Sustainability Leadership Conference (2012)
- Cypress Hills Verde Summit – Youth Arts Workshop (2011)
- Restoration Rocks: “Live Healthy, Live Green, Live Well” (2011)
- Afropunk Festival – Art production contributor (2008–2012)

== Venues curated ==
Jilani has curated exhibitions and programs at several New York cultural institutions, including:

- Skylight Gallery (Bedford-Stuyvesant Restoration Corporation)
- Salena Gallery, Long Island University
- SlyArt & Robot City
- Brooklyn Academy of Music
