= Plainview, Louisville =

Neighborhood in Jeffersontown, Kentucky

Coordinates: 38°13′53″N 85°33′58″W

Plainview is a neighborhood in the city of Jeffersontown, Kentucky and is located on the former site of the Plainview Dairy Farm. It is a Planned Unit Development which includes housing, workplaces, and shopping within a single development.

Plainview is located between I-64 and Shelbyville Road east of Hurstbourne Parkway.

The Plainview community has many amenities; such as the Swim & Tennis Center, where there is a swim team, with competitions throughout the year. There is also a yearly yard sale.

== See also ==
- R. C. Tway, owner of farmland that evolved into this neighborhood
