= Scott Fischer (producer) =

American film producer

Scott Fischer (born May 1, 1966, in Louisville, Kentucky) is an American film producer.

== Biography ==
Fischer is President of Firstar Films, a Los Angeles–based film production company. He has been credited with producing such films as Henry's Crime (2010), Brothers (2009), Get Low (2009), A Perfect Getaway (2009), The Forbidden Kingdom (2008), The Bank Job (2008) and Battle in Seattle (2007).

== Personal life ==
Fischer has two daughters, Alexis (Lexi) Diana and Jaclyn (Jadi) Dinah.
