= R. C. Tway =

American businessman (1881–1964)

Robert Chester Tway, Sr.
- Born: October 21, 1881; Louisville, Kentucky, U.S.
- Died: May 13, 1964 (aged 82)
- Resting place: Cave Hill Cemetery; Louisville, Kentucky, U.S.
- Occupations: Executive, Entrepreneur
- Known for: Business, Horse and Cattle Livestock Leader, Civic Leader
- Political party: Republican

Robert Chester Tway Sr. (October 21, 1881 – May 13, 1964), known as R. C. Tway, was a business, agricultural and political icon in the Louisville, Kentucky area. His activities provided a long-lasting footprint in Kentucky as his farm (named Plainview Farms) evolved into a large subdivision and business center located off Hurstbourne Lane, and his former Kentucky Trailer Company continues to manufacture trailers in Jefferson Riverport International. He is the namesake of Tway, Kentucky, where he owned a coal mining company for over forty years.

== Business career ==
Tway was involved in various activities as a businessman, livestock cattle and horse breeder and political leader in Louisville, Kentucky area. His contributions included the ownership of a 975-acre Jersey Cattle dairy and American Saddlebred farm in Jeffersontown, Kentucky. The dairy and horse farm was named Plainview Farms. Other contributions included the ownership and operation of a coal mining company (named R.C. Tway Coal Company) located in Harlan County, Kentucky, a trailer manufacturing company (named Kentucky Trailer or Kentucky Manufacturing Company), and participation in various Kentucky political activities. He was instrumental in formulating the first American Saddlebred Horse Museum to be located in Lexington, Kentucky.

== Kentucky Trailer ==
In 1936 Tway purchased Kentucky Wagon Manufacturing Company. With a name change (Kentucky Manufacturing Company under the name of Kentucky Trailers), Tway revolutionized the mode of the transportation industry by building large trailers for the road rather than the more common railway system. The company was located in Louisville, Kentucky near the University of Louisville campus. In 2008, the University of Louisville Foundation agreed to purchase the 33-acre manufacturing tract. Kentucky Trailer relocated to southwestern Jefferson County (Jefferson Riverport International). Kentucky Trailer (known also as Kentucky Manufacturing Company) is currently owned by several fourth generation members of R.C. Tway.

== Political career ==
He was actively involved in Kentucky and Jefferson County politics, primarily participating in Republican Party activities. Tway served as an alternate delegate to the 1940 Republican National Convention, and a delegate to the 1944, 1948, 1952 and 1956 Republican National Conventions representing Kentucky. He was a member of the Louisville-Jefferson County Republican Party Committee and Vice-Chair of the GOP State Central Committee.

== Plainview Farms ==
Tway lived or recreationed most of his entire life on a former potato farm, formerly known as the Garr Farm, which located in Jeffersontown, Kentucky. Tway inherited the farm from his mother (Harriet Amelia Garr). Tway developed the 970-acre farm into a very successful livestock breeding farm specializing in American Jersey Dairy cattle and American Saddlebred horses. The dairy farm utilized over 100 head of Jersey Cattle delivering jersey creamline milk and other dairy products in the Louisville area and would serve customers as far away as the University of Kentucky. He raised a national prize-winning American Champion Jersey Cow and owned a winner of the 1939 Grand Champion Kentucky Jersey Cattle Club Trophy -Best Female (Mighty Patsy). In 1941, Kentucky Governor Keen Johnson presented Tway with the Tattersall Trophy having the two best Jersey cattle bred by an exhibitor at the Kentucky State Fair. Plainview Farms was considered the largest dairy in the region.

Tway was a very successful breeder and exhibitor of American Saddlebred Horses. On his Plainview Farm, over 50 horses would be annually stalled under his direction. He was most famous for his ownership of Plainview's Julia, the 1959 and 1960 World's Grand Champion Five-gaited American Saddlebred and Plainview's Sophia Van Cleve, the 1960 World's Reserve Champion Three-Year-old Five-gaited American Saddlebred. He was a former director of the National Saddle Horse Breeders Association.

The name of the farm is credited to his wife, Mrs. R.C. (Estelle S. Bennett) Tway. When Estelle was asked to name the farm, she noted the farm simply had a plain view, thus "Plainview" became the name for the former potato farm.

== R.C. Tway Coal Company ==
Tway was founded in 1912 as Tway operated a coal company from 1914 to 1948 which employed 250 miners and staff in Harlan County, Kentucky. The coal company formed a nearby coal camp named Tway, Kentucky roughly 1 mile south of Harlan. An additional coal camp, also called Tway, was located in Southern Knox County, between Kay-Jay and Anchor. He was also a former owner of the James Coal Company. He served as a member of the Southern Appalachian Coal Operators Association and the Harlan County Coal Operators Association president for sixteen years.

== Awards ==
Tway was named to the 1964 World's Championship Horse Show Hall of Fame.

== Personal ==
Tway was raised on his mother's Plainview Farm (formerly Garr farm) home. In 1923, Tway built a Greek Revival home and remained there until his death. He was married to the former Estelle S. Bennett. R.C. Tway Sr. and Estelle had three children: Robert C. Tway Jr who inherited the oversight of Kentucky Trailer, William T. Tway (married the daughter of Churchill Downs CEO/Board Chair "Willam H. Veeneman") who inherited oversight of the Plainview Farms, and Helen Harriet Tway (Robertson).

Tway is a 1902 graduate of the Louisville Male High School and attended Kentucky Military Institute for college studies. He was a member and benefactor of Middletown Methodist Church. Tway served on the Kentucky Board of Agriculture and as a University of Kentucky trustee from 1941 to 1949, along with being a former director of the American Jersey Cattle Club.

Tway's home, a Greek Revival structure, became a clubhouse to the Plainview subdivision. It is currently owned by the City of Jeffersontown. The "Tway House" is listed on the National Register of Historic Places.

Tway is buried at Cave Hill Cemetery in eastern Louisville, Kentucky.
