= ZZ Packer =

American writer

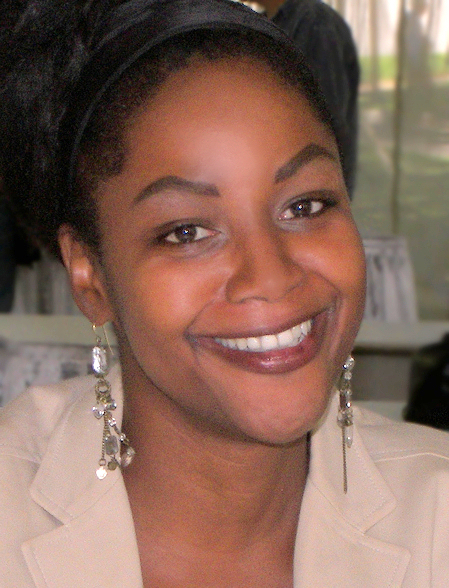
- ZZ Packer at the 2009 Texas Book Festival.
- Born: Zuwena Packer; January 12, 1973 (age 53); Chicago, Illinois, U.S.
- Education: Yale University (BA); Johns Hopkins University (MA); Iowa Writers' Workshop, University of Iowa (MFA)
- Writing career
- Period: 2000-present
- Notable awards: 5 Under 35 Honoree; Guggenheim Fellow (2005); Whiting Award (1999)

Zuwena "ZZ" Packer (born January 12, 1973) is an American writer, primarily of works of short fiction, and teacher. She is the recipient of the Rona Jaffe Foundation Writers' Award, the Whiting Award, and the Guggenheim Fellowship. Her book Drinking Coffee Elsewhere won the Commonwealth First Fiction Award and an ALEX award. It became a finalist for the PEN/Faulkner award and was selected for the Today Show Book Club by John Updike. In 2006, she was named a 5 Under 35 Honoree by the National Book Foundation.

== Early life and education ==
Born in Chicago, Illinois, Packer grew up in Atlanta, Georgia, and Louisville, Kentucky. "ZZ" was a childhood nickname; her given name is Zuwena. Packer enjoyed reading from a young age, visiting the local library daily with her mother in Atlanta. Her writing was published in the magazine Seventeen at the age of 19. Packer is a 1990 graduate of Seneca High School in Louisville, Kentucky.

Packer attended Yale University, receiving her BA in 1994. Her graduate work included an MA at Johns Hopkins University in 1995 and an MFA from the Iowa Writers' Workshop of the University of Iowa in 1999, where she was mentored by James Alan McPherson and Marilynne Robinson.

== Writing career ==
Her work was first published in the Debut Fiction issue of The New Yorker in 2000. Her short story in the issue became the title story in her collection Drinking Coffee Elsewhere. As Publishers Weekly put it, "this debut short story collection is getting the highest of accolades from the New York Times, Harper's, the New Yorker and most every other branch of the literary criticism tree."

"ZZ Packer’s Drinking Coffee Elsewhere is taught in creative writing courses nationwide and with good reason. This short story collection is brimming with characters who are striving to find themselves, to understand themselves, and to survive", commented novelist Colson Whitehead.

In a 2015 interview, when Packer was a Radcliffe Fellow, she reported that she was working on a novel set during Reconstruction in the aftermath of the Civil War. The novel-in-progress, The Thousands, "chronicles the lives of black, white, and Native American families shortly after the Civil War, through Reconstruction and the Indian Campaigns in the Southwest". She has been regularly contributing to The New York Times Magazine and The New Yorker.

== Teaching and fellowships ==
Packer has held teaching posts at Stanford University, where she was a Jones Lecturer, the Michener Center at the University of Texas at Austin, Vassar College, and San Francisco University. As of 2025, she is Assistant Professor of English at the Robert Penn Warren Center for the Humanities at Vanderbilt University and teaches Advanced Narrative Techniques on the American Short Fiction MFA for All.

She has been the recipient of a Dobie Paisano Fellowship, a Guggenheim Fellowship, a Rona Jaffe Foundation Writers’ Award, a National Endowment for the Arts grant, a Wallace Stegner Fellowship at Stanford University, a Hodder Fellowship at Princeton University, a Hutchings Fellowship at Harvard University, a Knafel Fellowship at the Harvard Radcliffe Institute, and the Whiting Award.

== Works ==
=== Books ===
Year	Title
2003	Drinking Coffee Elsewhere

=== Anthologies ===
Year	Title
2000	Best American Short Stories 2000
2003	Best American Short Stories 2003
2008	New Stories from the South: The Year's Best
2015	100 Years of the Best American Short Stories

==== Other works ====
Year	Title	Publication
1999	Brownies	Harper's Magazine
2000	Drinking Coffee Elsewhere	The New Yorker
2002	The Ant of the Self	The New Yorker
2002	Every Tongue Shall Confess	Ploughshares
2002	The Stranger	The Washington Post Magazine
2004	Derby Pie	The New York Times Magazine
2004	An Interview with John Kerry	The Believer Magazine
2004	I Was Black, and I Told Her	O, The Oprah Magazine
2004	Losing My Religion	Salon
2005	'Dr. King's Refrigerator': Thinking Outside the Icebox	The New York Times Magazine
2005	Sorry, Not Buying	The American Prospect
2007	Buffalo Soldiers	Granta
2007	Pita Delicious	The Washington Post Magazine
2007	Gideon	The Guardian
2007	The Finishing Party: ZZ Packer's Writing Group	O, The Oprah Magazine
2008	I want Obama to be daily proof that race is no barrier	The Guardian
2008	Saved to ‘Drafts’	Granta
2008	Working the Reunion	The New York Times Magazine
2009	No Polenta, No Cry	The New York Times Magazine
2009	Remembering Updike: ZZ Packer	The New Yorker
2009	A Finished Revolution?	The Oxford American
2009	Confessions of a Shopaholic's Wife	Glamour
2010	Dayward	The New Yorker
2011	Ferraro's Barack Problem	HuffPost
2012	Keeping it Weird in Austin, Texas	Smithsonian
2013	It's Beyoncé's World and We're Just Living In It	Newsweek
2017	Trump Talk: Your Translation Guide	The New Yorker
2017	What to Expect When You're Expecting Fascism	The New Yorker
2018	News of an ‘Outrage’ Used to Mean Something Very, Very Different	The New York Times Magazine
2018	When Is ‘Civility’ a Duty, and When Is It a Trap?	The New York Times Magazine
2019	July 30, 1866	The New York Times Magazine
2019	Truth And Fiction	Port Magazine
2020	Preacher of the New Antiracist Gospel	GQ
2020	Sarah Cooper Doesn't Mimic Trump. She Exposes Him.	The New York Times Magazine
2020	The Empty Facts of the Breonna Taylor Decision	The New Yorker

== Awards ==
Year	Title	Notes
1997	Rona Jaffe Foundation Writers' Award	Winner
1999	Whiting Award	Winner
1999	Bellingham Review Award	Winner
2003	Commonwealth Club of California Award	Winner
2004	PEN/Faulkner Award	Finalist
2004	PEN/Hemingway Award	Finalist
2004	Alex Award	Winner

=== Other honors ===
Year	Title
2006	5 under 35 honoree by the National Book Foundation
2007	America's Best Young Novelists by Granta
2007	Smithsonian Magazine's Young Innovators
2010	The New Yorker magazine's "20 under 40" luminary fiction writers.
