= Kathy Cary =

American chef

Kathy Cary (born 1954) is owner and executive chef at Lilly's Bistro in Louisville, Kentucky and a seven-time James Beard Award nominee.

Cary grew up on a farm and has been noted for her work in the farm-to-table movement, emphasizing locally sourced ingredients.

In addition to Lilly's Bistro, Cary also owns La Peche Gourmet To Go. In May 2015, she competed on the Food Network's show Beat Bobby Flay. Among other nominations, Cary was one of 20 semifinalists for the 2015 James Beard Foundation's restaurant and chef awards. In 2016, she was again named a semifinalist, one of 20 named to the foundation's "Best Chef: Southeast" list.

Cary's daughter Lilly Cary, for whom Lilly's Bistro is named, is now a pastry chef with a doughnut delivery service in Louisville.
