= Gee Horton =

American artist

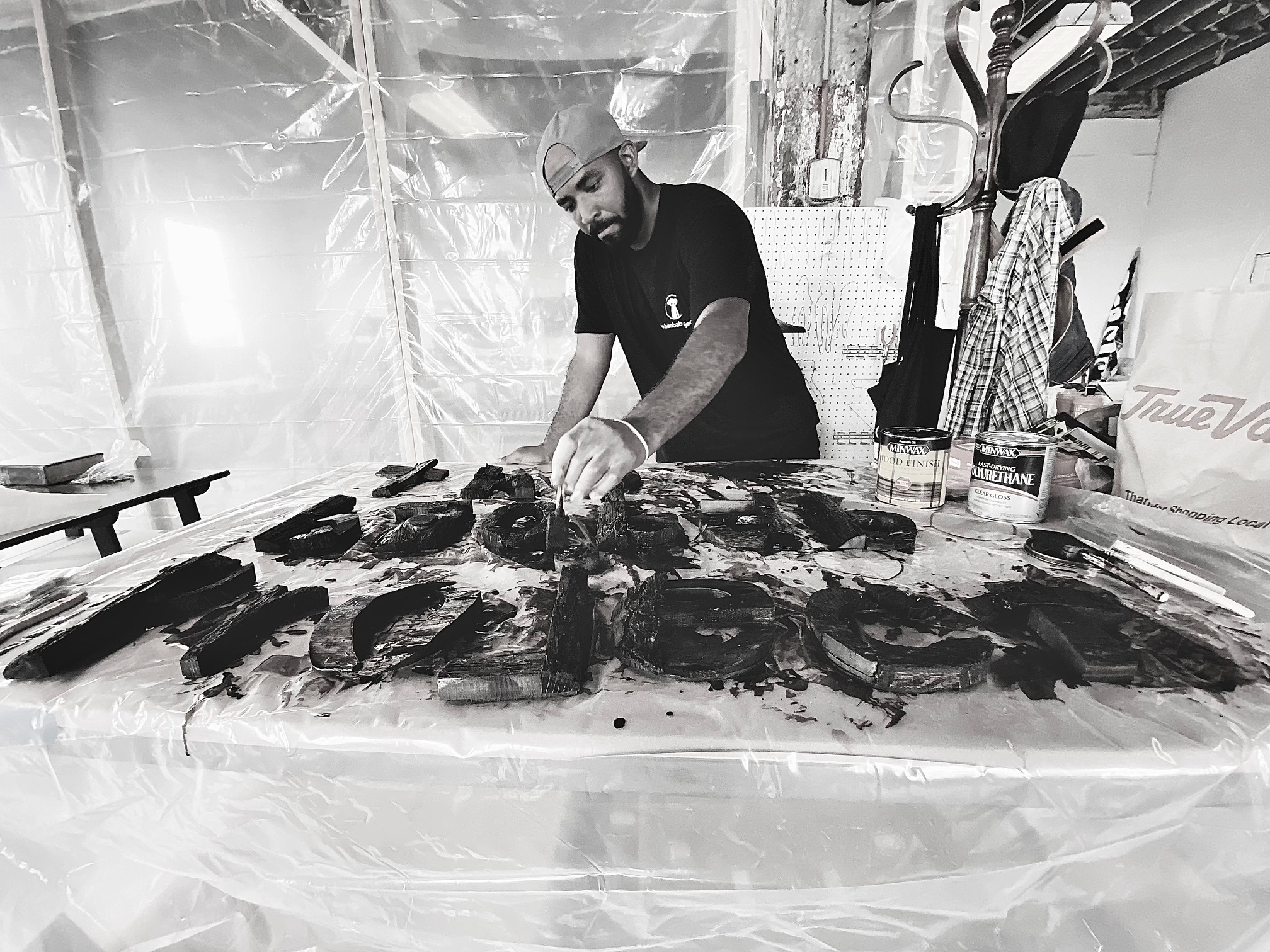
- Born: Louisville, Kentucky
- Years active: 2020 - Present
- Notable work: Coming of Age series, The Baobob Project, BLINK 2024 Mural Series
- Website: https://www.geehorton.com/

Gee Horton (/dʒi ˈhɔːrtən/) is an American contemporary artist based in Cincinnati, Ohio. He is recognized for his graphite and charcoal portraiture, as well as mixed-media works that address themes of identity, memory, and emotional experience. Horton's practice often integrates photorealistic drawing with archival materials and installation, focusing on aspects of Black adolescence and masculinity.

== Early life and education ==
Horton was born in Louisville, Kentucky. He earned a Bachelor of Psychology from Thomas More University in 2006 and a Master of Social Work from the University of Louisville in 2008. His academic training in psychology and trauma theory has influenced his approach to art. Horton transitioned from a corporate career to full-time art practice in 2020.

== Work ==
In 2020, Horton began the "Coming of Age" portrait series and received ArtsWave's Truth and Reconciliation Grant. He also launched The Baobab Project, a space for Black men to explore vulnerability and personal narratives through visual storytelling. During this period, Horton served as an artist-in-residence at the Mercantile Library of Cincinnati, where he produced a portrait of abolitionist Peter H. Clark, recognized with an Emmy Award. Horton's work has been featured in television productions such as HBO's Insecure and Amazon Prime's Harlem. His debut solo exhibition, "Chapter One: Coming of Age" (2021) at the Alice F. and Harris K. Weston Art Gallery, examined African American adolescence through contemporary cultural references. The Cincinnati Art Museum acquired his work for the "Coming of Age: New Acquisition Exhibit" in 2022

His subsequent exhibitions include "Chapter Two: A Subtle Farewell to the Inner Child" (2024) as part of the FotoFocus Biennial at Kennedy Heights Arts Center. and "Chapter Three: Be Home Before the Streetlights" at KMAC Contemporary Art Museum in Louisville, Kentucky. These exhibitions further explored themes of identity, memory, and healing

Horton participated in the 2023 FotoFocus + Creative Time Symposium, where he engaged in discussions on land, identity, and the role of art in social transformation. He also contributed to the Blink Festival in Cincinnati with the "Coming of Age" mural series, which spans three blocks of Vine Street, addressing youth vulnerability and celebrating community

Gee Horton is the founder of Gee Horton Studio Gallery in Cincinnati's Over-the-Rhine district, which functions as an art studio, print shop, and gallery space providing services to local artists and collectors.

== Exhibitions ==
=== Selected solo exhibitions ===
2021: Chapter One: Coming of Age, Alice F. & Harris K. Weston Art Gallery, Cincinnati, Ohio

2022: Coming of Age: New Acquisition Exhibit, Cincinnati Art Museum, Cincinnati, Ohio

2024: Chapter Two: A Subtle Farewell to the Inner Child, Kennedy Heights Cultural Arts Center, Cincinnati, Ohio

2024–2025: Chapter Three: Be Home Before the Streetlights, KMAC Contemporary Art Museum, Louisville, Kentucky

=== Selected group exhibitions ===
2019: Manifestations of Time, The Mohawk Gallery, Cincinnati, Ohio

2019: Banz Studios Presents, Banz Studios Gallery, Cincinnati, Ohio

2020: Uprising, Kennedy Heights Arts Center, Cincinnati, Ohio

2020: Black & Brown Faces, Cincinnati Art Museum, Cincinnati, Ohio

2020: Truth & Reconciliation, National Underground Railroad Museum, Cincinnati, Ohio

2022: Let’s Grow, Alpha Arts Alliance, Brooklyn, New York

2023: Ohio Voices, Cincinnati Art Museum, Cincinnati, Ohio

2023: A Flower For Our Inner Child, Koik Contemporary Gallery, Mexico City, Mexico

2024: Proximity of Fate, Mansfield Art Center, Mansfield, Ohio

2025: The Light We Share, The Portal Gallery at Toledo School for the Arts, Toledo, Ohio

== Public art projects and commissions ==
2020: Black Lives Matter Mural, Cincinnati City Hall, Cincinnati, Ohio
2020: Cincinnati Music Festival Outdoor Art Museum, Washington Park, Cincinnati, Ohio
2021: Coming of Age Mural, Court Street Plaza, Cincinnati, Ohio
2021: Harlem, Amazon Prime, Season 1, Episode 11 (artwork appearance)
2024: Blink Lights Festival, Cincinnati, Ohio

== Public collections ==
2021: Mercantile Library of Cincinnati
2022: Cincinnati Art Museum

== Residencies ==
2021: Artist in Residence, Mercantile Library of Cincinnati
2022: Diasporic Soul Artist Residency, Sebikhotane, Senegal

== Honors and recognition ==
2021: ArtsWave Truth and Reconciliation Grant
2022: Best Gallery Exhibit, CityBeat Cincinnati – Coming of Age: Chapter I – In Search of Self…Identity at Weston Art Gallery
2022: Emmy Award for Artist Residency at the Mercantile Library of Cincinnati
2023: Cincinnati Business Courier 40 Under 40 honoree
2024: Creative Ohio Semi-Finalist, Champion Advocacy Awards
2025: Be Home Before the Streetlights (short film), Official Selection, OTR International Film Festival
2025: CODA Summit Creative Revolutionary Honoree
