= Brooklyn Arts Council Film and Video Festival =

The BAC International Film and Video Festival is an independent film festival held in the borough of Brooklyn in New York City sponsored by the Brooklyn Arts Council.

Established in 1966, the festival is the longest running event of its kind in Brooklyn. The selection groupings accepted and screened in the festival include work by independent, college student and youth (K-12) in both feature and short length. Categories are narrative, experimental, documentary, animation, and films by Brooklyn filmmakers and women of African descent.

The event is held at several venues including Brooklyn Arts Council office, Pratt Institute, and Long Island University.
