= Columba Carroll =

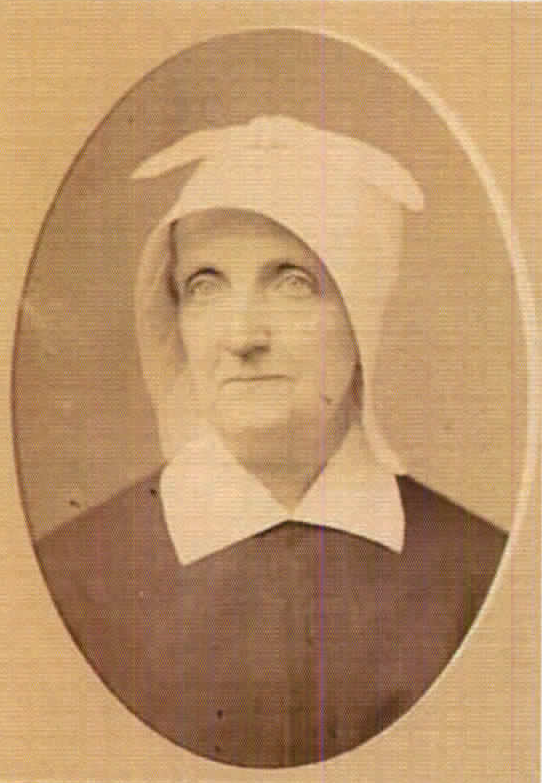
- Born: June 5, 1810; Dublin
- Died: December 18, 1878; Louisville

Columba Carroll (June 5, 1810 – December 18, 1878) was an Irish-born American nun and educator. She served as mother superior of the Sisters of Charity of Nazareth from 1862 to 1868 and from 1874 to 1878.

She was born Margaret Carroll was born on June 5, 1810, in Dublin, Ireland, the daughter of James Carroll and Eliza Cooney of County Wicklow. In 1815, the family relocated to Albany, New York and then a year later to Louisville, Kentucky. Both parents died due to the 1822 Louisville typhoid fever epidemic. Orphaned, she was placed at the Nazareth Academy of the Sisters of Charity and her sister Sophia at the academy run by the Sisters of Loreto. When she entered the Sisters of Charity at age fifteen, she chose her name to honor one of her deceased Academy teachers, Sister Columba Tarleton.

For most of her five decades in the Sisters of Charity, she served as teacher and Directress of Study for the Nazareth Academy. She oversaw education of students as well as sisters who would serve as teachers, writing pedagogical texts and developing the curriculum. As mother superior, during the American Civil War she dispatched sisters to serve as nurses for war wounded and obtained, through Senator Lazarus Powell, a letter of protection from President Abraham Lincoln for the order and their school. Thanks to a donation from William Shakespeare Caldwell, whose late wife studied at the Nazareth Academy, the order founded Saints Mary and Elizabeth Hospital in Louisville in 1874.

Columba Carroll died on December 18, 1878, in Louisville, Kentucky, of yellow fever.
