= Joanna Banks =

American book collector

Joanna Banks (March 28, 1943 – September 28, 2025) was an American book collector. In 2018 Banks donated her collection of African-American literature to Penn Libraries. The collection comprises over 10,000 books by African-American authors, primarily published from the 1970s onwards, with particular strengths in women's writing, children's literature, cookbooks, and African-American periodicals.

== Life ==
Banks grew up in Louisville, Kentucky. She began collecting books in 1965, with the Book-of-the-Month Club book The Langston Hughes Reader. Reading Langston Hughes inspired her to build a collection of African-American literature. In the 1980s Banks also documented African-American literary culture in Washington, D.C., compiling photograph albums of authors like Alice Walker and James Baldwin at readings, book signings and conferences. In 1984 she started a book club dedicated to reading works by black women authors, where she came to know Barbara Savage, a professor at the University of Pennsylvania. Savage suggested that the Kislak Center for Special Collections, Rare Books, and Manuscripts at Penn might be a good home for her collection. Banks gave the books to the university on the condition that the children's books in the collection "were not locked away behind closed doors, so that no child would have access to them".
