= Drinking Coffee Elsewhere =

Short story collection by ZZ Packer

- First edition
- Author: ZZ Packer
- Language: English
- Genre: Fiction
- Publisher: Riverhead Books
- Publication date: 2003
- Publication place: United States
- Pages: 238
- ISBN: 9781573222624

Drinking Coffee Elsewhere is a 2003 collection of eight short stories by ZZ Packer. Packer was given an advance for thousands of dollars and she promoted the book in a 13 city tour. The book deals with race, gender, identity, and the need for belonging. It received multiple awards.

== Plots ==
In the titular story, young black Yale University freshman Dina joins a series of orientation games that are meant to help students bond. In a game where students have to answer what inanimate object they would like to be, Dina says a revolver which leads her to have meetings with university staff and a psychiatrist. Her answer transforms her from an "honor roll student" into a "dangerous outcast" to others. Dina insults others, lies to the psychiatrist, and stays away from students who are also black. She begins an affair with a white female student who also has no friends, but Dina stops their relationship when the white girl publicly states that she is a lesbian due to Dina never being true to herself.

The story Speaking in Tongues is about a 14-year-old named Tia who runs away from her great-aunt to try to find her mother who abandoned her. Tia fails to find her mother in Atlanta, Georgia, but she meets a prostitute named Marie and a hustler named Dezi. After Tia has a sexual encounter with Dezi, Tia has a "visionary feeling that she's been unable to achieve in church".

Clareese discovers that the scriptures of her church are keeping her stuck in Every Tongue Shall Confess.

Doris Is Coming is based in 1961 in Louisville, Kentucky, in which segregation was ending.

The only male main character, Spurgeon, must deal with a father who bullies him and abandons him in a city in the story The Ant of the Self.

In Our Lady of Peace, Lynnea teaches inner-city children after moving to Baltimore, Maryland, from Kentucky.

Another girl named Dina visits Tokyo, Japan, to become rich in Geese.

In Brownies, a Brownie troop with only black girls want to attack a white Brownie troop while they are camping, but they find out that life can be cruel to anyone upon discovering that the troop is for girls with a learning disability.

== Publication ==
Packer was given an advance for thousands of dollars and she promoted the book in a 13 city tour. The title story was in The New Yorker's 2000 issue of debut fiction. The book deals with race, gender, identity, and the need for belonging.

== Reception ==
Bomb said, "This set of stories is a pleasure to dive into for the wit, the writing, the characters, and the novel plots, but most of all for the human truth that in the search for self-knowledge, we find we each defy category." E. Ce Miller of Bustle wrote that Drinking Coffee Elsewhere is "the one book every woman should read in her 20s." Packer was an honoree for the 2006 National Book Award for the 5 under 35 category due to the book. The book won an Alex Award from the American Library Association in 2004. It was a finalist for the PEN/Faulkner Award for Fiction. John Updike chose the book as a selection for the Today Show book club on NBC in 2003. Gale published a study guide about the book.
