= Barbara Milton =

American actress

Barbara Milton (8 July 1898 – 20 July 1971), also known as Barbara Milton Watkins Strater, was an American theatre actress.

== Biography ==
Barbara Milton was born Barbara Watkins in Louisville, Kentucky to Mrs. Edward J. Watkins. Her uncle was Bruce Haldeman, President of the company that published Colonel Henry Watterson's (also known as Marse Henry) Louisville Courier-Journal. Her grandfather, Colonel W. A. Milton, was Secretary-Treasurer of the company.

She spent her childhood in her native city. She attended the Louisville Girls' High School and in the spring of 1916, during her graduating year, she played the role of Katherine in the performance of The Taming of the Shrew given by the girls of the graduating class, at the Macauley Theatre. This performance fired her latent ambition to become an actress and follow a stage career. She communicated her desire to the first friend of the family, Colonel Watterson, who also suggested her stage name, Barbara Milton, after her grandfather. Later that summer, with a recommendation letter from Col. Watterson, she traveled with her mother to New York, to join Henry Miller's company as a general understudy. After a few weeks, her hard study and patience war rewarded with the role of Elisabeth Daingerfield, in the play Come out of the Kitchen. The New York Times from December 3, 1916, wrote:

When it was determined that 'Come out of the Kitchen' should be presented in New York […] Mr. Miller decided to intrust the role of the other Daingerfield girl to the newcomer from the South (i.e. Barbara Milton). His faith was rewarded by a performance so fresh and natural as to add to the effectiveness of the whole.

Between 1916 and 1920 she played another two roles: Harriet Lane in Call the Doctor, at the Empire Theatre and Nellie, in The Acquittal. In 1921 she married Edward L. Strater. She later performed with the Little Theatre Co. in Louisville.

=== Death ===
Barbara Watkins Strater died at 20 July 1971, in Louisville, at the age of 73.
