= Kentucky School for the Blind =

Educational facility in Louisville, Kentucky

Coordinates: 38°15′26″N 85°42′49″W

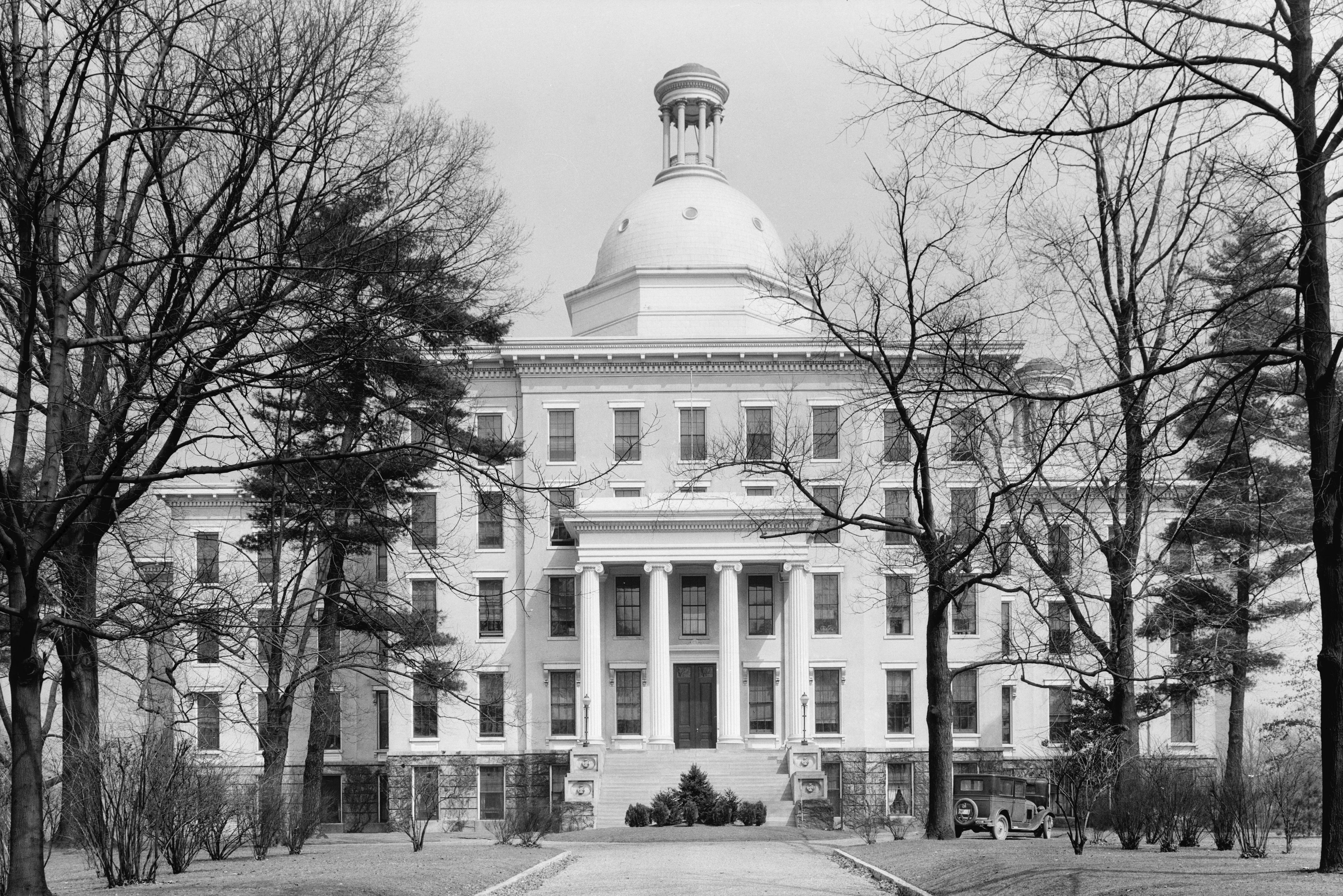

Location
- 1867 Frankfort Avenue; Louisville, Kentucky 40206; United States

Information
- Type: Public high school
- School district: Kentucky Department of Education
- Principal: Peggy Sinclair-Morris
- Enrollment: 64 (2023-2024)
- Colors: Red and white
- Nickname: Wildcats
- Website: ksb.k12.ky.us

The Kentucky School for the Blind (KSB) is an educational facility for blind and visually impaired students from Kentucky who are aged up to 21. The school provides a dormitory setting for its students.

KSB is a member of the North Central Association of Schools for the Blind (NCASB). It receives no basic school funding from the state government, and instead must "rely on money from the state’s general fund."

== History ==
Bryce McLellan Patten founded the Kentucky Institution for the Education of the Blind in 1839 in Louisville, Kentucky. In 1842, it was chartered as the Kentucky Institution for the Blind by the state legislature as the third state-supported school for the blind established in the United States. In 1855, it moved to its present location on Frankfort Avenue in the Clifton neighborhood. About this time, it was renamed the Kentucky School for the Blind.

The school separated African-American students under de jure educational segregation until it desegregated circa 1954.

In 2018, an ex-principal of the school accused the Kentucky Board of Education of gender discrimination.

== Notable alumni ==
Grammy winning bluegrass fiddler Michael Cleveland is a previous student of the facility. Another previous student became a notable advocate for others with visual impairments.
