= Tway, Kentucky =

Unincorporated community in Kentucky, United States

- Unincorporated community
- Location within Kentucky Location within the United States
- Coordinates: 36°49′38″N 83°18′58″W
- Country: United States
- State: Kentucky
- County: Harlan
- Elevation: 1,316 ft (401 m)
- Time zone: UTC-6 (Central (CST))
  - Summer (DST): UTC-5 (CST)
- GNIS feature ID: 505694

Tway is an unincorporated community in Harlan County, Kentucky, United States. Its post office is closed.

== Notable people ==
- Green Wix Unthank, United States District Court judge
