= Doan Hoang =

Film director, producer and screenwriter

Doan Hoang Curtis
- Hoàng Niên Thục-Đoan
- Born: 1972 (age 53–54); South Vietnam
- Other name: Doan Hoang
- Citizenship: United States
- Education: Smith College
- Occupations: Film producer, director, editor, writer
- Known for: 2007 documentary Oh, Saigon
- Spouse: John Francis Campbell (1998–2006) Philip Curtis (2014-present)
- Website: www.ohsaigon.com

Đoan Hoàng Curtis, Doan Hoang, Đoan Hoàng or Doan Hoàng Curtis is a Vietnamese-American documentary film director, producer, editor, and writer. Hoàng Curtis produced the Netflix 2025 documentary series Turning Point: The Vietnam War. She directed and produced the 2007 documentary Oh, Saigon about her family, after leaving Vietnam on the last civilian helicopter as Saigon fell. The documentary won several awards at film festivals and was broadcast on PBS from 2008 to 2012, and multiple channels at streaming services. Hoang Curtis was selected to be a delegate to Spain for the American Documentary Showcase. Hoang Curtis has received awards and grants from the Sundance Institute, ITVS, Center for Asian American Media, the Ms. Foundation for Women, Brooklyn Arts Council, and National Endowment of the Humanities.

== Biography ==
Hoang Curtis was born in the Republic of Vietnam, and is the daughter of a former South Vietnamese air force major from Saigon and a former Mekong Delta plantation heiress. On April 30, 1975, she was airlifted on the final civilian helicopter out of Vietnam at the end of the war. Four months afterwards, she settled in Louisville, Kentucky. When she was nine, she wrote her first book on the Vietnam War. At the age of 12, she made her first documentary The French Revolution. She graduated from Smith College in 1994.

Hoang Curtis worked as an editor and writer for national magazines, including Details, Saveur, House & Garden, Garden Design, and Spin.

Oh, Saigon: A War In the Family Hoang Curtis developed the film Oh, Saigon, in which she documented her family, over seven years. In 2005, the Sundance Institute awarded Hoang a grant for the then titled Homeland. She also received funding from the Independent Television Service (ITVS), the Center for Asian American Media, and the Corporation for Public Broadcasting.

Hoang Curtis premiered Oh, Saigon in March 2007 at the San Francisco International Asian American Film Festival, and received a nomination for Best Documentary. She appeared with Oliver Stone at the 2007 Austin Film Festival. She had her sold-out New York City premiere at the Museum of Modern Art in 2008, where curator William Sloan called the film, "truly strong, human, and brave." At the 2008 Los Angeles Asian Pacific Film Festival, her film received the Grand Jury Award for Feature Length Film (Documentary). Oh, Saigon won the Best Film and Best Feature Documentary at the 42nd Brooklyn Arts Council International Film Festival in 2008. It also screened at the Vietnam International Film Festival. In 2011 and 2012, as part of the American Documentary Showcase, Hoang took the film to 16 countries, including Spain, Colombia, Zimbabwe and Vietnam. She screened the film in Vietnam for the US Department of State at the US Embassy and the US Consulate. She was also invited by the Ambassador of Vietnam to the United Nations, Lê Hoài Trung, to return for an overseas Vietnamese senate.

Hoang Curtis heads her own film production company, Nuoc Pictures, based in New York and Los Angeles.

She is directing and producing a follow-up to Oh, Saigon called Oh, America: Divided Country, about the second generation division in her family in America. Hoang received funding from the Center for Asian American Media for Oh, America and was a 2022 Firelight Spark Fund recipient. She also received awards and grants from the Sundance Institute and the National Endowment of the Humanities.

Her 2015 film, Scars for Eyes was partly funded by grants from the Asian Women's Giving Circle and the Ms. Foundation.

In addition to French Revolution, Hoang has worked on a number of short films: A Requiem for Vegetables describes "the massacre of vegetables by a scary 1950s homemaker"; Good Morning, Captains features two Gen-Xers that are involved in a car accident; and Agent depicts the impact of a CIA agent's life on his family. American Geisha is a documentary of Hoang's aunt Yen, who had served as a geisha for Japanese businessmen in San Francisco. In 2013, she helped produce and direct a music video for pop singer Emily Newhouse called "Addicted to the Internet", which was featured at the Greenpoint Film Festival in Brooklyn.

Hoang Curtis is a member of the non-profit film group, Film Fatales. Hoang Curtis was an early board member of V-Day, a top-ranked charity working to end violence towards women using performances of the Vagina Monologues and other works. Hoang Curtis was also a character in The Vagina Monologues play and book.

In 2024–2025, Hoang Curtis was series producer on the Netflix series, Turning Point: The Vietnam War, releasing/released April 30, 2025, the 50th anniversary of the Fall of Saigon.

== Personal life ==
Hoang Curtis married composer Philip Curtis in 2014. The two collaborated on Scars for Eyes and Oh, America.

== Other ventures ==
Hoang is also "an intuitive trauma practitioner" and has a practice called Regenerate Healing and called by author Elizabeth Gilbert "not the only person I’ve ever met who was raised in war and violence who later became a mystic. In 2002–2006, Hoang had a yoga studio called Om Shanti in Weehawken, New Jersey. Hoang also set up a bicycle helmet company called Tat Hats. In 2009, Hoang founded the Los Angeles-based Camellia Creative Catering & Events, specializing in international cuisine made with locally sourced organic food.

== Filmography ==
=== Feature films ===
- Oh, America: Divided Country (work in progress)
- Oh, Saigon (2007)
- The Trail of Ho (2008)
- Legacy of Denial (2009)
- Side Man, in post-production
- Scars For Eyes, in post-production

=== Short films ===
- French Revolution (1984)
- A Requiem for Vegetables (1993)
- How Not To Make A Video (1994)
- Good Morning, Captains (1994)
- Nuoc (2000)
- Agent (2002)
- American Geisha (2011)
- Hard Times (2012) - co-producer
- "Addicted to the Internet" by Emily Newhouse (2013 music video)
- "The Longest Walk" (2024)
