= List of people from Lexington, Kentucky =

The following are notable people who were either born, raised, or have lived for a significant period of time in the Lexington, Kentucky, metropolitan area:

List of people from Lexington, Kentucky
| Name | Description |
|---|---|
| Chad Aull | Politician |
| Andy Barr | U.S. representative for Kentucky |
| Henry Bidleman Bascom | Editor, U.S. Congressional Chaplain, university president |
| Dotsie Bausch | Cyclist, national champion, Pan American Champion, and Olympic silver medalist |
| Dominic Black | Freestyle and folkstyle wrestler |
| Kent Blazy | Songwriter |
| Joseph Bosworth | Lawyer, politician, and businessman |
| Sweet Evening Breeze | Drag queen, activist, healthcare worker, and socialite. |
| John Breckinridge | U.S. Attorney General and Senator |
| John B. Breckinridge | U.S. Representative |
| John C. Breckinridge | U.S. vice president, U.S. Senator |
| Sophonisba Breckinridge | Founder, School of Social Works Administration, University of Chicago |
| Belle Brezing | Brothel madam |
| William Wells Brown | Abolitionist leader |
| Walker Buehler | Major League Baseball pitcher |
| Laura Bell Bundy | Actress |
| LaVerne Butler | Clergyman and college president |
| Mrs. Leslie Carter | Stage and silent-film actress |
| Elizabeth Pickett Chevalier | Silent-film director and screenwriter, author |
| Meredith Clark | Academic |
| Thomas D. Clark | Historian and author |
| Henry Clay | U.S. Representative and Senator, Secretary of State |
| Tyler Clippard | Major League Baseball pitcher |
| George Clooney | Actor, producer, film director |
| Joyce Compton | Actress |
| Kelly Craft | United States Ambassador to the United Nations and United States Ambassador to Canada |
| Drew Curtis | Founder of Fark |
| Guy Davenport | Author |
| Jefferson Davis | Politician, President of the Confederate United States of America |
| Dermontti Dawson | NFL player for the Pittsburgh Steelers |
| Carl H. Dodd | Major, Medal of Honor recipient for his service during the Korean War |
| Josiah Dunham | Secretary of State of Vermont and founder of Lafayette Female Academy |
| Charlotte Dupuy | Slave who sued Henry Clay for freedom in 1829 |
| Peter Durrett | Church founder |
| Henry Earl | Folk hero arrested approximately 1,500 times |
| Farah Fath | Actress |
| Henry Faulkner | Artist |
| London Ferrill | Religious leader |
| Randy Fine | U.S. Representative and gambling industry executive |
| Ralph Foody | Actor |
| Steve Gabbard | NFL player |
| Gatewood Galbraith | Author, lawyer |
| Marvin Gay Sr. | Pentecostal minister; father and murderer of R&B singer Marvin Gaye |
| Tyson Gay | Sprinter |
| Rayna Gellert | Bluegrass fiddler |
| Troy Gentry | Musician, country-music duo Montgomery Gentry |
| Arin Gilliland | National Women's Soccer League player for the Chicago Red Stars |
| Trevor Gott | Major League Baseball pitcher |
| Andy Green | Bench coach of the Chicago Cubs |
| James Baker Hall | Poet, photographer, novelist, teacher |
| Joe B. Hall | Hall of Fame basketball coach for University of Kentucky, 1972–1985 |
| Tom Hammond | NBC sportscaster |
| John O. Hodges | Kentucky state senator |
| Han Kuo-Huang | Ethnomusicologist |
| Haydar Hatemi | Painter |
| Isaac Scott Hathaway | Artist, professor at the Tuskegee Institute, first African-American to design a US coin |
| Lewis Hayden | Abolitionist leader |
| Bradlee L. Heckmann | Neuroimmunologist |
| Richard Hell | Punk-rocker |
| Ben Hoffman | Actor and writer best known for his satirical country music persona, Wheeler Walker Jr. |
| Josh Hopkins | Actor |
| Silas House | Author and 2023 Kentucky Poet Laureate |
| Shayna Hubers | Criminal convicted of killing her boyfriend Ryan Poston; compared with convicted killer Jodi Arias due to the similarity of their crimes |
| B. Wayne Hughes | Founder of Public Storage |
| Sarah Hutchings | Composer |
| Kevin Jarvis | Major League Baseball player |
| Robert Kirkman | Comic-book writer and TV producer best known for The Walking Dead |
| Laura Johnson Dandridge | 19th century White House chef, Lexington restaurateur |
| William Decker Johnson | English-born American newspaper founder, and editor |
| Ashley Judd | Actress |
| Naomi Judd | Musician |
| Gregory Kaidanov | Chess grandmaster |
| Austin Kearns | Major League Baseball player |
| Paul Levy | Writer |
| Mary Todd Lincoln | First Lady, wife of Abraham Lincoln |
| William Lipscomb | Nobel Prize in Chemistry |
| Brian Littrell | Musician, Backstreet Boys |
| Shirley Ardell Mason | a.k.a. Sybil, suffered from dissociative identity disorder |
| Tucker Max | Author |
| Les McCann | Jazz musician and painter |
| Anne Hazen McFarland | physician and medical journal editor |
| Shug McGaughey | Thoroughbred trainer |
| Ralph Eugene Meatyard | Photographer |
| Akhdiyat Duta Modjo | Singer. |
| Irene Moon | Also known as Katja Chantre Seltmann, musician |
| Charles Chilton Moore | Atheist |
| Davey Moore | Boxer, featherweight champion |
| Jessica Moore | Journalist |
| John Morgan | Attorney, founder of personal injury law firm Morgan & Morgan |
| John Hunt Morgan | C.S. Army general |
| Thomas Hunt Morgan | Nobel prizewinning evolutionary biologist, geneticist, embryologist |
| Gurney Norman | Author, professor |
| Natalie Novosel | Basketball player, WNBA's Washington Mystics |
| Luther Pennington | United Methodist pastor and politician |
| Grace Perreiah | Artist |
| John Peterman | Businessman |
| H. Foster Pettit | State representative, mayor of Lexington |
| Ben Revere | Major League Baseball player, Washington Nationals; played high school baseball in Lexington |
| Sarah Rice | Singer, musician, actress and artist |
| Kevin Richardson | Musician, Backstreet Boys |
| Charles P. Roland | Historian |
| Rubi Rose | Rapper |
| Robbie Ross Jr. | Major League Baseball player for the Boston Red Sox |
| Adolph Rupp | Hall of Fame basketball coach for the University of Kentucky, 1930–1972 |
| Alfred Francis Russell | 10th President of Liberia |
| Colton Ryan | Actor |
| Vincent Sanford | Basketball player for Hapoel Galil Elyon of the Israeli Basketball Premier League |
| Robert Schneider | Musician |
| Edwin B. Self | Playwright and novelist |
| Michael Shannon | Actor |
| Joseph O. Shelby | C.S. Army general |
| Eric Shelton | NFL running back for the Carolina Panthers |
| Tubby Smith | Basketball coach, University of Kentucky |
| Samuel J. W. Spurgeon | Christian minister, newspaper publisher, editor |
| Harry Dean Stanton | Actor |
| Chris Stapleton | Country musician |
| Henry A. Tandy | Born enslaved, entrepreneur and building contractor |
| Walter Tevis | Author of The Hustler and The Color of Money |
| Tinashe | Singer and actress |
| David Tolliver | Musician, Halfway to Hazard |
| John Tuska | Artist |
| Jim Varney | Actor and comedian |
| Adalin Wichman | Sculptor and artist, designer of Eclipse Award Trophy |
| Biddy Wood | Journalist and jazz promoter |
| Steve Zahn | Actor |

== See also ==
- List of University of Kentucky alumni
- List of people from Kentucky
- List of people from the Louisville metropolitan area
