= Henry Hogan =

American sergeant (1840–1916)

- Born: March 8, 1840; County Clare, Ireland
- Died: April 20, 1916 (aged 76); Montana, U.S.
- Burial place: Custer County Cemetery Miles City, Montana
- Military career
- Allegiance: United States of America
- Branch: United States Army
- Service years: 1865-1879
- Rank: First Sergeant
- Units: 5th United States Infantry Regiment, Company G
- Conflicts: Cedar Creek; Battle of Bear Paw Mountain
- Awards: Medal of Honor (2)

Henry Hogan (March 8, 1840 – April 20, 1916) was a First Sergeant in the United States Army during the Black Hills War. He is noted as one of only nineteen individuals to receive the Medal of Honor twice.

== Biography ==
Henry Hogan was born in County Clare, Ireland. He moved to the United States, enlisted into the United States Army, and was assigned to Company G, in the 5th United States Infantry Regiment, under the command of Colonel Nelson A. Miles. On October 21, 1876, Hogan fought at the Battle of Cedar Creek, in Montana Territory against Lakota warriors under the leadership of Native American Chief Sitting Bull. For his actions in this engagement, he would receive his first Medal of Honor.

Nearly one year after Cedar Creek on September 30, 1877, Hogan fought with the 5th Infantry against the Nez Perce under Chief Joseph in the Battle of Bear Paw. In this battle, he carried out a dramatic rescue of Henry Romeyn, carrying his wounded Second lieutenant off the field in the midst of heavy fire from the Nez Perce warriors. For this, he received a second Medal of Honor. Hogan lived in Miles City, Montana, which was named for Hogan's commander, the Colonel of the 5th Infantry Nelson A. Miles. He died at his ranch outside of Miles City and is buried in the Custer County Cemetery there.

== Medal of Honor citations ==
FIRST AWARD

Rank and organization: First Sergeant, Company G, 5th U.S. Infantry.
Place and date: At Cedar Creek, etc., Montana, October 21, 1876 to January 8, 1877.
Entered service at: United States.
Birth: Ireland.
Date of issue: June 26, 1894.

Citation:

... for bravery at Cedar Creek, Montana ...

SECOND AWARD

Place and date: At Bear Paw Mountain, Montana, September 30, 1877.

Citation:

... carried Lieutenant Romeyn, who was severely wounded, off the field of battle under heavy fire.

== See also ==
- List of Medal of Honor recipients
- List of Medal of Honor recipients for the Indian Wars
