= Marvin Young =

Marvin Young may refer to:

- Marvin R. Young (1947-1968), United States Army soldier and recipient of Medal of Honour
- Marvin Young (rapper) (born 1967), better known as Young MC, British-American rapper, singer and actor
- Marvin Young (footballer) (born 2005), Dutch footballer
