= Henry Earle (disambiguation) =

Henry Earle (1789–1838) was an English surgeon.

Henry Earle may also refer to:

- Henry Earle (politician) (1841–1934), Newfoundland politician
- Henry Robert Valence Earle (1912–1996), Canadian politician in Newfoundland
- Sir Henry Earle, 3rd Baronet (1854–1939) of the Earle baronets

== See also ==
- Henry Earl (1949–2024), American folk hero arrested 1,500 times
- Harry Earle (1868–1951), footballer
- Henry Earle Vaughan (1912–1978), American telephony engineer
