= Aquilla Coonrod =

American soldier

- Born: c. 1831; Springfield Township, Ohio, US
- Died: May 14, 1884 (aged 53); Fort Buford, Dakota Territory
- Burial place: Custer National Cemetery
- Military career
- Allegiance: United States of America; Union
- Branch: United States Army; Union Army
- Service years: 1861–1864; 1873–1884
- Rank: First Sergeant
- Units: 7th U.S. Cavalry; 5th U.S. Infantry
- Conflicts: American Civil War; Indian Wars; Black Hills War
- Awards: Medal of Honor

Aquilla Coonrod or Coonrad (c. 1831 – May 14, 1884) was an American soldier in the U.S. Army who served with the 14th, 48th and 125th Ohio Volunteer Infantry during the American Civil War and with the 7th U.S. Cavalry and the 5th U.S. Infantry during the Indian Wars.

He participated in several engagements against the Sioux in the Montana Territory between 1876 and '77, most notably at Cedar Creek and Wolf Mountain, and received the Medal of Honor for "extraordinary acts of heroism and gallantry in action" by General William T. Sherman. He was also the first known white child born in present-day Williams County, Ohio, and is one of two men from Williams County, the other being American Civil War hero William J. Knight, to receive the award.

Coonrod later served with the 5th U.S. Infantry at Fort Buford in Dakota Territory (now Williams County, North Dakota). In 1884, he and his men were escorting U.S. Army paymaster Major Whipple and a large payroll shipment for various frontier outposts when they were attacked by a group of bandits. Although Coonrod was mortally wounded, his men drove off the bandits and successfully defended the shipment valued at $20,000. His body was originally interred at the Post Cemetery at Fort Buford and moved to the Custer National Cemetery near the Crow Agency in 1896.

== Biography ==
Aquilla Coonrod was born to Woolery and Hulda Coonrod in Springfield Township, Ohio, in 1831. His parents were among the first settlers in Williams County, and Coonrod became the earliest known white child to be born in the area. His mother died less than a year after his birth, and his father, Woolery, married Mary Coy in 1835. After his father's death in 1847, Coonrod lived with his stepmother until the start of the American Civil War. He was among the first men in Williams County to volunteer for military service and enlisted with the 14th Ohio Volunteer Infantry on April 23, 1861. After his initial 90-day term ended, he joined the 48th and 125th Ohio Infantry eventually rising to the rank of captain. On May 9, 1864, he resigned his commission and took up farming in Pulaski Township. Seven years later, he moved to Bryan, Ohio, where he worked at the Hub and Spoke factory.

In 1873, Coonrod returned to the military and served with the 7th U.S. Cavalry then commanded by Colonel George Armstrong Custer. While with the 7th Cavalry, he was a sergeant and regimental standard-bearer. Coonrod eventually became a member of the 5th U.S. Infantry. Between October 21, 1876, and January 8, 1877, he took part in General Nelson Miles "winter campaign" against the Sioux Indians in the Montana Territory. In October 1876, Coonrod participated in actions against Chief Sitting Bull at Cedar Creek and, in April 1877, fought Crazy Horse at Wolf Mountain. He was one of 31 soldiers who received the Medal of Honor for "extraordinary acts of heroism and gallantry in action" during this period. Commended for his bravery at Cedar Creek and other operations, Coonrod personally received his medal from General William T. Sherman, then Commanding General of the Army, on April 27, 1877. He and Civil War hero William J. Knight were the only two men from Williams County ever to receive the award.

Coonrad remained in the military until his death. In late 1877, he commanded the escort of Chief Joseph, following his surrender to General Miles, from the Bear Paw Mountains in Montana to Fort Buford in the Dakota Territory. He was later permanently assigned to Fort Buford. On May 14, 1884, he led a small escort guarding U.S. Army paymaster Major Whipple and a $20,000 payroll shipment intended for Fort Buford and outlying frontier outposts. After leaving Glendive, Montana, the escort was ambushed by seven bandits about 46 miles southwest of Fort Buford. Coonrod and his men were able to drive off the outlaws; however, Coonrod himself was shot twice in the abdomen and died of his wounds. His body was taken back to the Post Cemetery at Fort Buford, where it was buried, then moved to the Custer National Cemetery near the Crow Agency in 1896.

Richard Cooley, a local historian in Bryan, published a biography of his life that was featured in the Williams County Historical Society newsletter in April 1991. In November 2003, a special plaque was displayed to commemorate both Coonrod and William J. Knight at the Williams County Courthouse in downtown Bryan. Both Coonrod and Knight were also profiled by The Bryan Times in 2003 and again in 2007.

== Medal of Honor citation ==
Rank and organization: Sergeant, Company C, 5th U.S. Infantry. Place and date: At Cedar Creek, Mont., October 1876 to January 1877. Entered service at Bryan, Ohio. Birth: Williams County, Ohio. Date of issue: April 27, 1877.

Citation:

Gallantry in action.

== See also ==
- List of Medal of Honor recipients
