= Laura Johnson (disambiguation) =

Laura Johnson is an American actress.

Laura Johnson may also refer to:

- Laura Lee Johnson, American biostatistician
- Laura Winthrop Johnson (1825–1889), American author and poet
- Laura Johnson Dandridge (1852–1918), née Johnson, African American female head chef at the White House
- Laura Knight (1877–1970), née Johnson, English artist
- Laura Emelia Naplin (1893–1985), née Johnson, American politician, member of the Minnesota State Senate
- Laura Waterman (born 1939), née Johnson, American author, outdoorswoman, and conservationist

== See also ==
- Lauri Johnson (born 1949), American actress
