= John Baker (Medal of Honor, 1876) =

- Born: c. 1855; Hessen, Germany
- Military career
- Allegiance: United States
- Branch: Army
- Unit: 5th Infantry Regiment
- Conflicts: Battle of Cedar Creek (1876)
- Awards: Medal of Honor

Musician John Baker was a soldier in the United States Army and a recipient of the Medal of Honor.

== Biography ==
John Baker was born in the Grand Duchy of Hesse, about 1855, emigrated to the United States and enlisted in the United States Army from Brooklyn, New York.

Baker was assigned to Company D of the 5th Infantry Regiment, commanded by Colonel (later Lieutenant General) Nelson A. Miles, and served in Montana where his regiment was fighting the Lakota Sioux under the leadership of Sitting Bull. Baker distinguished himself at the Battle of Cedar Creek (1876) and in other engagements between October 1876 and January 1877.

On April 27, 1877, he was awarded the Medal of Honor "for gallantry in engagements at Cedar Creek, Montana and other campaigns during the period 21 October 1876 to 8 January 1877."

His later life and place of burial are unknown.

== Medal of Honor citation ==
The President of the United States of America, in the name of Congress, takes pleasure in presenting the Medal of Honor to Musician John Baker, United States Army, for gallantry in engagements at Cedar Creek, Montana and other campaigns during the period 21 October 1876 to 8 January 1877, while serving with Company D, 5th U.S. Infantry. Date of Issue: April 27, 1877. Action Date: October 21, 1876 to January 8, 1877.
