= Joseph Cable (Medal of Honor) =

American soldier (1848–1877)

- Born: January 1, 1848; Cape Girardeau, Missouri, U.S.
- Died: October 15, 1877 (aged 29); Montana, U.S.
- Burial place: Custer National Cemetery, Crow Agency, Montana
- Military career
- Allegiance: United States of America
- Branch: United States Army
- Rank: Corporal
- Units: Company I, 5th U.S. Infantry
- Conflicts: American Indian Wars
- Awards: Medal of Honor

Joseph A. Cable (January 1, 1848 – October 15, 1877) was a United States Army soldier during the American Indian Wars who received the Medal of Honor for his actions at Cedar Creek, Montana and other campaigns.

== Life ==
Joseph A. Cable was born on January 1, 1848, in Cape Girardeau, Missouri. Later, his official residence was listed as Madison, Wisconsin.

Cable enlisted into the United States Army, and was assigned as a Private to Company I, of the 5th United States Infantry Regiment. While serving in that organization, he won the Medal of Honor for his actions in the Battle of Cedar Creek, Montana on October 21, 1876. He was promoted to Corporal, then mortally wounded at the Battle of Bear Paw, Montana, and died of wounds on October 15, 1877. Some have claimed that he was interred in the Custer National Cemetery, in Crow Agency, Montana, although the cemetery has no burial record for him.

== Medal of Honor citation ==
Rank and organization: Private, Company I, 5th United States Infantry Regiment. Place and date: At Cedar Creek, Montana Territory, October 21, 1876. Entered service at: United States. Born: January 1, 1848, Cape Girardeau, Missouri. Date of issue: 1877

Citation:

For gallantry in engagements at Cedar Creek, Montana and other campaigns during the period 21 October 1876 to 8 January 1877, while serving with Company I, 5th U.S. Infantry.

== See also ==
- List of Medal of Honor recipients
- List of Medal of Honor recipients for the Indian Wars
