= Adalin Wichman =

American artist

- Born: 1922; Paris, Kentucky
- Died: March 10, 2013; Lexington, Kentucky
- Known for: Sculpture
- Awards: Milner Award

Adalin Wichman (September 11,1922 – March 10, 2013) was an American sculptor and artist from the U.S. state of Kentucky. Wichman designed the Eclipse Award Trophy in 1971, which are awarded to horses and individuals who have made outstanding contributions to equestrian sport. Her work also included jewelry design, paintings, bronze sculptures, and portraits. Examples of her work can be found in public and private collections worldwide, including the art collection of Queen Elizabeth II, the Kentucky Derby Museum and the Lexington Public Library.

== Life ==
She was born in Paris, Kentucky, September 11, 1922. She earned her bachelor's degree from the University of Kentucky, graduating magna cum laude. She married her husband, architect William Wichman, and settled in Lexington, Kentucky, where she pursued a career as an artist. She also taught English.

Adalin Wichman served as the adverting director for Keeneland, a Kentucky thoroughbred horse racing facility, from 1969 until 1989.

In 1971, Keeneland's J.B. Faulconer asked Wichman to create a bronze statuette to serve as the prize for the Thoroughbred Racing Association's Eclipse Award. Wichman based her design for the Eclipse Award Trophy on an 18th-century painting of the undefeated English racehorse, Eclipse. The first Eclipse Awards, featuring Wichman's trophy, was held in 1972 to honor the 1971 racing season.

In addition equestrian pieces, Wichman also created other non-equestrian works as well. She created the Foucault pendulum clock, which is displayed in the rotunda of the Lexington Public Library. Wichman designed a two-sided bust of the Kentuckian historian Thomas D. Clark, which is housed at the Lexington History Museum. Her painting of Lucille Caudill Little can be found hanging in the Little Fine Arts Library at the University of Kentucky.

Wichman was awarded the Milner Award in 2011, the highest prize awarded by the Kentucky Governor's Awards in the Arts.

Adalin Wichman died from a brief illness at her home in Lexington, Kentucky, on March 10, 2013, at the age of 91. She was survived by her two daughters, Adrian and Alison. Her husband, William, died in 2000.
