= Christopher Freemeyer =

German-born soldier in the U.S. Army

- Born: 1838; Kingdom of Bavaria
- Died: October 14, 1894 (aged 56); Brooklyn, New York, United States
- Burial place: Cypress Hills National Cemetery
- Military career
- Allegiance: United States of America
- Branch: United States Army
- Service years: c. 1876–1877
- Rank: Private
- Unit: 5th U.S. Infantry
- Conflicts: Indian Wars
- Awards: Medal of Honor

Private Christopher Freemeyer (1838 – October 14, 1894) was a German-born soldier in the U.S. Army who served with the 5th U.S. Infantry during the Indian Wars. He was one of thirty-one men who received the Medal of Honor for gallantry during General Nelson A. Miles campaign against the Sioux in the Montana Territory from October 1876 to January 1877.

== Biography ==
Christopher Freemeyer was born in Bavaria, Germany in 1838. Emigrating to the United States, he enlisted in the U.S. Army in New York City, New York and joined Company D of the 5th U.S. Infantry. Freemeyer was assigned to frontier duty in the Montana Territory and took part in General Nelson A. Miles "winter campaign" against the Sioux lasting from October 21, 1876, to January 8, 1877. He distinguished himself in several engagements with the Sioux during this period, most notably, at the Battle of Cedar Creek. On April 27, 1877, Freemeyer was one of thirty-one soldiers who received the Medal of Honor for "gallantry in actions". After leaving the army, he returned to New York where he died on October 14, 1894, at the age of 56. Freemeyer was interred at Cypress Hills National Cemetery in Brooklyn.

== Medal of Honor citation ==
Rank and organization: Private, Company D, 5th U.S. Infantry. Place and date: At Cedar Creek, etc., Mont., October 21, 1876 to January 8, 1877. Entered service at: Chicago, Ill. Birth: Germany. Date of issue: April 27, 1877.

Citation:

Gallantry in action.

== See also ==
- List of Medal of Honor recipients for the Indian Wars
