= Wilson Bryant Burtt =

United States army officer (1875–1957)

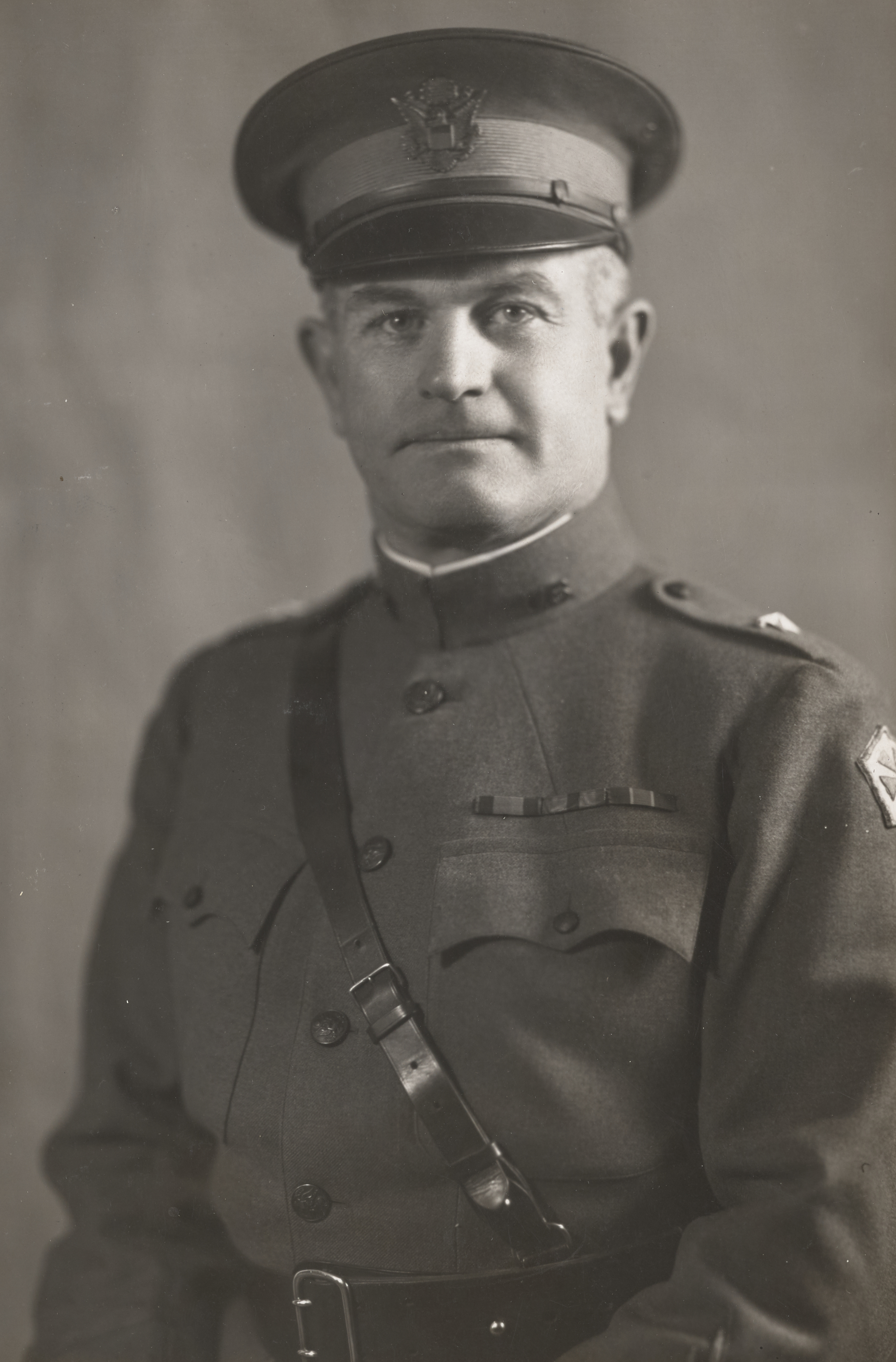
- Burtt as a brigadier general during World War I
- Born: January 1, 1875; Hinsdale, Illinois, US
- Died: March 21, 1957 (aged 82); Chelsea, Massachusetts, US
- Burial place: Arlington National Cemetery
- Military career
- Branch: United States Army
- Service years: 1899–1938
- Rank: Major General
- Conflicts: Spanish–American War; World War I
- Awards: Distinguished Service Medal; Legion of Honour; Croix de Guerre; Order of St Michael and St George; Order of the Crown of Italy

Wilson Bryant Burtt (January 1, 1875 – March 21, 1957) was a career United States Army officer and served as a brigadier general during World War I.

== Early life ==
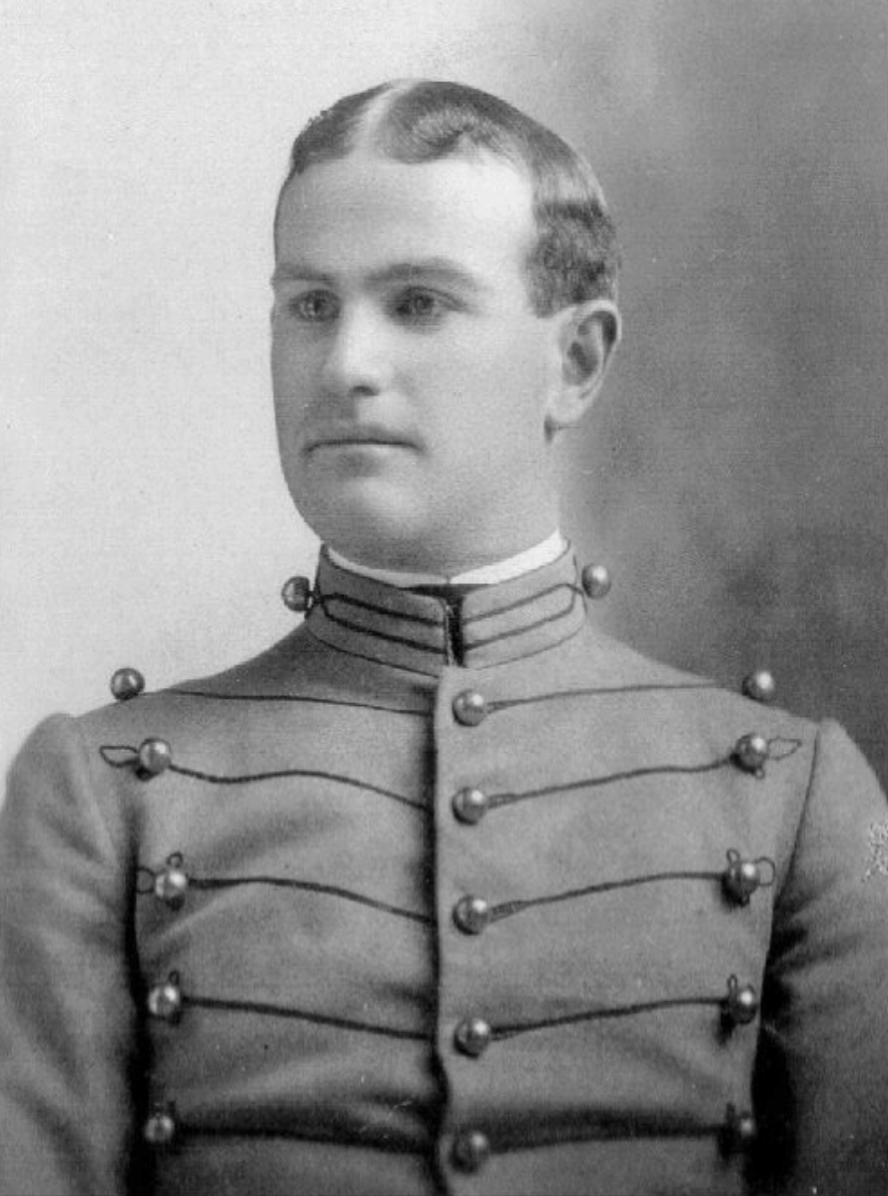
Burtt at West Point in 1899

Burtt was born in Hinsdale, Illinois on January 1, 1875.

== Military career ==
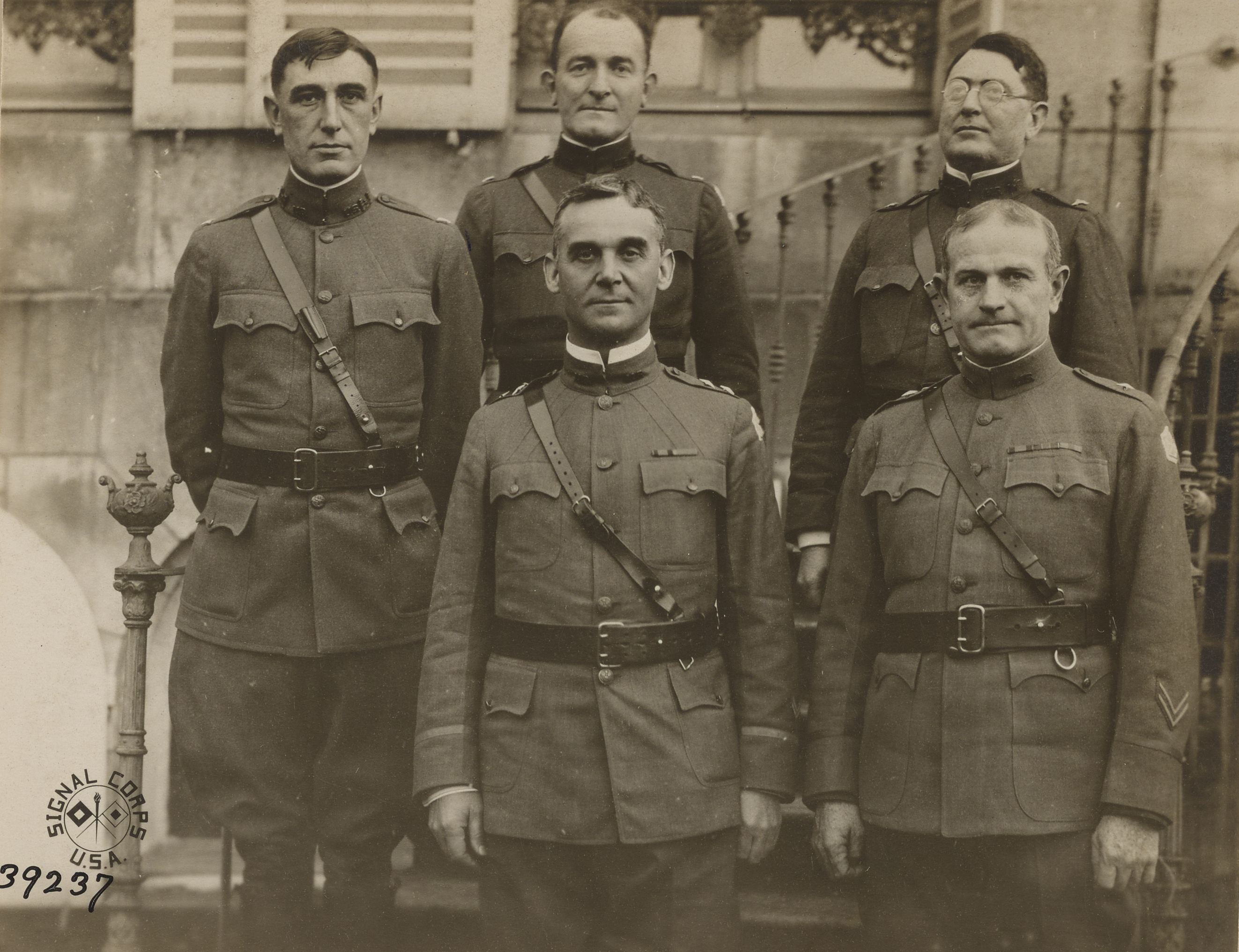
Major General Charles P. Summerall (left, first row), commanding V Corps, with Brigadier General Wilson B. Burtt (center, top row) as his chief of staff, in France, in either 1918 or 1919

Burtt graduated from the United States Military Academy at West Point in February 1899, was commissioned as a second lieutenant with the 8th Infantry Regiment, and was shipped off to Cuba immediately.

Following the Spanish–American War, Burtt was stationed in the Philippines from September 1900 to February 1901 with the 8th Infantry and March 1901 to July 1903 with the 5th Infantry. He returned to the States and was a professor of Military Science and Tactics at Kentucky State University from August 1904 to August 1907. Burtt returned to the Philippines with the 18th Infantry from November 1907 to December 1908. After six months at the Presidio of Monterey in California, he again returned to the Philippines with the 20th Infantry until June 1910. Burtt was an honor graduate of the Army School of the Line in 1911 and subsequently graduated from the Army Staff College in June 1912. In both 1914 and 1915, he instructed the California National Guard. He observed the German armies in the field from December 1914 to April 1915. During the Punitive Expeditionary Force in Mexico, he served under General John J. Pershing.

During World War I, Burtt was the Assistant Chief of the Air Service and chief of staff, Fifth Army Corps. He served in most of the major battles of the war. He was given the temporary rank of brigadier general from June 1918 to August 1919.

Following the war, Burtt was an instructor at the General Staff College. In 1920, he resigned as a major but was reappointed as a lieutenant colonel the same year. In 1927, Burtt graduated from the Army War College and was promoted to colonel. He resigned as a brigadier general in 1938, but in 1942 was made a major general on the retired list.

== Awards ==
Burtt was awarded the Distinguished Service Medal for his performance of duty as Chief of Staff of the 5th Corps. The citation for the medal reads:

The President of the United States of America, authorized by Act of Congress, July 9, 1918, takes pleasure in presenting the Army Distinguished Service Medal to Brigadier General Wilson Bryant Burtt, United States Army, for exceptionally meritorious and distinguished services to the Government of the United States, in a duty of great responsibility during World War I. As Chief of Staff of the 5th Corps, General Burtt displayed great tact and judgment in the organization of that command. He directed with marked ability the staff work of his corps during the St. Mihiel and Argonne-Meuse offensives and was a potent factor in insuring the successes of his organization in that campaign.

He also received the Legion of Honour and Croix de Guerre from France, Order of St Michael and St George from Britain, and the Order of the Crown of Italy.

== Death and legacy ==
Burtt died in Chelsea, Massachusetts on March 21, 1957. He was buried at Arlington National Cemetery.
