= Battle of Cedar Creek (1876) =

Battle of the Great Sioux War in southern Montana, 21 October 1876

Coordinates: 47°30′55″N 106°16′41″W

- Part of the Great Sioux War of 1876
| Date | October 21, 1876 |
| Location | Cedar Creek, Montana Territory |
| Result | United States tactical victory |

Belligerents
| Sioux | United States; Shoshone; Crow |

Commanders and leaders
| Sitting Bull | (United States) Nelson A. Miles |

Strength
| ~300 | 398 |

Casualties and losses
| 6 bodies recovered unknown wounded | 2 killed 2 wounded |

The Battle of Cedar Creek (also called Big Dry Creek or Big Dry River) occurred on October 21, 1876, in the Montana Territory between the United States Army and a force of Lakota Sioux Native Americans during the Great Sioux War of 1876. The battle broke out after talks between Colonel Nelson A. Miles and Chief Sitting Bull broke down, and ended with the surrender of 400 Lakota lodges (with approximately 2,000 men, women, and children) to Miles six days later.

== History ==
Colonel Nelson A. Miles led the 5th United States Infantry Regiment in the summer of 1876 from Fort Leavenworth, Kansas, up the Missouri River on a paddlewheel boat from Yankton, South Dakota to the Yellowstone River, to help subdue the Sioux, and Cheyenne, who had claimed a major victory that summer at the Battle of Little Bighorn. Miles joined General Alfred Terry on Rosebud Creek in autumn and marched with him up the Rosebud to join with General Crook. The two commanders together moved east and crossed the Tongue River, and reached the mouth of the Powder River. Here the two commands separated, with General Crook moving south and east toward the Black Hills, and a detachment under Captain Anson Mills engaged and defeated a force of Indians in September at the Battle of Slim Buttes. Mills had been sent by Crook to obtain supplies from the Black Hills because their supplies were running perilously low, and at times, the men had to resort to eating horseflesh to survive.

After separating from General Crook, General Terry with Col. Miles moved north up Dry Creek, east and then south again to eventually reached Glendive, in Montana Territory, on the Yellowstone River where the troops established winter headquarters. Col. Miles equipped his troops with winter gear and established a temporary base at the mouth of the Tongue River.

Troops under Col. Elwell S. Otis escorted a train of more than 100 supply wagons that had been dispatched from a post on Glendive Creek, Montana Territory, to supply Miles's troops. On October 11, Sioux warriors ambushed the slow moving wagon train near Spring Creek, killing several mules and temporarily driving off the wagons. Undaunted, the wagon train tried again to reach Miles, but the Indians again attacked it along Spring Creek on October 15. This time, the wagon crews and their escort managed to fend off their attackers and continue their passage.

Soon afterwards, two Indian emissaries approached Colonel Otis and suggested that Miles meet with Sitting Bull, the long revered spiritual leader of the Hunkpapa Sioux. Miles accepted the offer, and set out for Cedar Creek, Montana Territory, north of the Yellowstone River. On October 21, 1876, Miles met with the Indian leader to parley between the lines of the Indians and the soldiers, at Sitting Bull's request. Sitting Bull offered to trade for ammunition so his followers could hunt buffalo. He would not bother the soldiers, if they did not bother him. Miles informed Sitting Bull of the government's demands for a surrender. While neither leader was pleased, both agreed to meet on the morrow after consulting with their subordinates.

Some of Sitting Bull's minor chiefs wanted to leave the warpath and return to the reservations, but many others wanted to fight. On October 21, the conference resumed. Sitting Bull again demanded that Miles and his soldiers leave, and that no more wagon trains be allowed in Sioux territory. He threatened to kill any chief who still wanted to lead his band back to the reservations. The talks quickly broke down, and the leaders returned to their forces. Soon, gunfire erupted. After a sharp skirmish, Sitting Bull withdrew. The army claimed to have chased the Lakota for up to 42 miles (68 km), collecting large quantities of dried meat, lodge poles, camp equipage, ponies and broken down cavalry horses, and arms along the way. On October 27, over 400 lodges (with 2,000 men, women, and children) formally surrendered to Miles and peacefully returned to their reservations. However, some of Sitting Bull's more ardent followers headed northward for Canada, and Miles made preparations to pursue them throughout the winter.

== Order of battle ==
United States Army, Colonel Nelson Appleton Miles, 5th United States Infantry Regiment, Commanding.

- 5th United States Infantry Regiment, Companies A, B, C, D, E, G, H, and I.
- Crow and Shoshone Scouts.

Native Americans, Chief Sitting Bull.

- Lakota Sioux

== Medal of Honor recipients ==
5th United States Infantry Regiment

Company A:

- First Sergeant David Roche, Company A, 21 October 1876 – 8 January 1877, Cedar Creek, Montana.
- Sergeant Michael McLoughlin, Company A of the 5th U.S. Infantry received the Medal of Honor for his actions at Cedar Creek. Born in Ireland, January 4, 1840. He died on June 8, 1921.
- Corporal David Holland, Company A, October 1876 – 8 January 1877, Cedar Creek, Montana.
- Private Fred C. Hunt, Company A, October 1876 – 8 January 1877, Cedar Creek, Montana. Died 21 July 1918, Montana Soldier's Home, Columbia Falls, Montana. Buried in the adjacent cemetery. The headstone erroneously gives his name as Frederick C. Hunt.
- Private John McHugh, Company A, 21 October 1876 – 8 January 1877, Cedar Creek, Montana.
- Private Henry Rodenburg, Company A, 5th U.S. Infantry. Place and date: At Cedar Creek, Montana, October 21, 1876, to January 8, 1877. Birth: Germany. Entered service at: New York. Date of Issue: April 27, 1877. Citation: "Private Rodenburg personally helped in the security of settlers throughout the region. For extreme gallantry, he was awarded the Medal of Honor and promoted Corporal." Died December 13, 1899, New York City. Interred in Cypress Hills National Cemetery, Brooklyn, New York.
- Private Charles Sheppard, Company A, 21 October 1876 – 8 January 1877, Cedar Creek, Montana.

Company B:

- Corporal John Hadoo, Company B, October 1876 – 8 January 1877, Cedar Creek, Montana

Company C:

- First Sergeant Wendelin Kreher, Company C, 21 October 1876 – 8 January 1877, Cedar Creek, Montana.
- Sergeant Aquilla Coonrod, Company C, October 1876 – January 1877, Cedar Creek, Montana.
- Sergeant William Wallace, Company C, 21 October 1876 – 8 January 1877, Cedar Creek, Montana.
- Corporal Edward Johnston, Company C, October 1876 – 8 January 1877, Cedar Creek, Montana.
- Private James S. Calvert, Company C, October 1876 – January 1877, Cedar Creek, Montana.
- Private Philip Kennedy, Company C, 21 October 1876 – 8 January 1877, Cedar Creek, Montana.
- Private Owen McGar, Company C, 21 October 1876 – 8 January 1877, Cedar Creek, Montana.
- Private Patton G. Whitehead, Company C, 21 October 1876 – 8 January 1877, Cedar Creek, Montana.

Company D:

- Musician John Baker, Company D, October 1876 – January 1877, Cedar Creek, Montana.
- Private Christopher Freemeyer, Company D, 21 October 1876 – 8 January 1877, Cedar Creek, Montana.
- Private Edward Rooney, Company D, 21 October 1876 – 8 January 1877, Cedar Creek, Montana.

Company E:

- Sergeant Robert McPhelan, Company E, 21 October 1876 – 8 January 1877, Cedar Creek, Montana. Interred at Leavenworth National Cemetery

Company G:

- First Sergeant Henry Hogan, Company G, (one of 19 two-time recipients): October 1876 - January 1877, Cedar Creek, Montana.
- Sergeant Dennis Byrne, Company G, October 1876 – January 1877, Cedar Creek, Montana.
- Private Richard Burke, Company G, October 1876 – January 1877, Cedar Creek, Montana.
- Private John S. Donelly, Company G, October 1876 – January 1877, Cedar Creek, Montana.
- Private Michael McCormick, Company G, 21 October 1876 – 8 January 1877, Cedar Creek, Montana.
- Private David Ryan, Company G, 21 October 1876 – 8 January 1877, Cedar Creek, Montana.

Company H:

- George Miller, Corporal, Company H, 5th U.S. Infantry. Place and date: At Cedar Creek, etc., Mont., October 21, 1876 to January 8, 1877. Entered service at: ------. Birth: Brooklyn, N.Y. Date of issue: April 27, 1877. Citation: Gallantry in action.
- Corporal Charles Wilson, Company H, 21 October 1876 – 8 January 1877, Cedar Creek, Montana.

Company I:

- Joseph A. Cable, Private, Company I, 5th U.S. Infantry. Place and date: At Cedar Creek, etc., Montana, October 21, 1876, to January 21, 1877. Birth: Cape Girardeau, Mo. Entered service at: Wisconsin. Date of Issue: April 27, 1877. Citation: Gallantry in action. Additional information: Died of wounds on October 15, 1877, while engaged against the Nez Perce under Chief Joseph during the Battle of Bears Paw Mountain, Montana, September 30, 1877.
- Private Charles H. Montrose, Company I, 21 October 1876 – 8 January 1877, Cedar Creek, Montana

== Sources ==
- Greene, Jerome A., Yellowstone Command: Colonel Nelson A. Miles and the Great Sioux War, 1876-1877, University of Nebraska Press, 1994. ISBN 0-8032-7046-1
- Pohanka, Brian C., Nelson A. Miles, Arthur L. Clark, 1986. ISBN 0-87062-159-9
- Miles, General Nelson A., Personal Recollections of General Nelson A. Miles.
