= Patton G. Whitehead =

American soldier

Patton George Whitehead (1840–1900) was an American soldier who was awarded the Medal of Honor for heroism during campaigns against Native Americans in Montana from 1876 to 1877.

== Biography ==
Whitehead was born on September 25, 1840, in Russell County, Virginia. He enlisted in the U.S. Army in Louisville, Kentucky and was assigned to Company C, 5th U.S. Infantry

During the winter of 1876, Major General Nelson Miles led American soldiers in a series of engagements against the Sioux mostly in and around the Montana Territory. Whitehead was one of 31 soldiers to receive the Medal of Honor for "gallantry in action" during the period from October 21, 1876, to January 8, 1877. Whitehead was issued the Medal of Honor on April 27, 1877.

He died on December 8, 1900, and is buried in Calvary Cemetery in Los Angeles, California.

== Medal of Honor citation ==
Gallantry in action.
