= 5th Infantry Regiment (United States) =

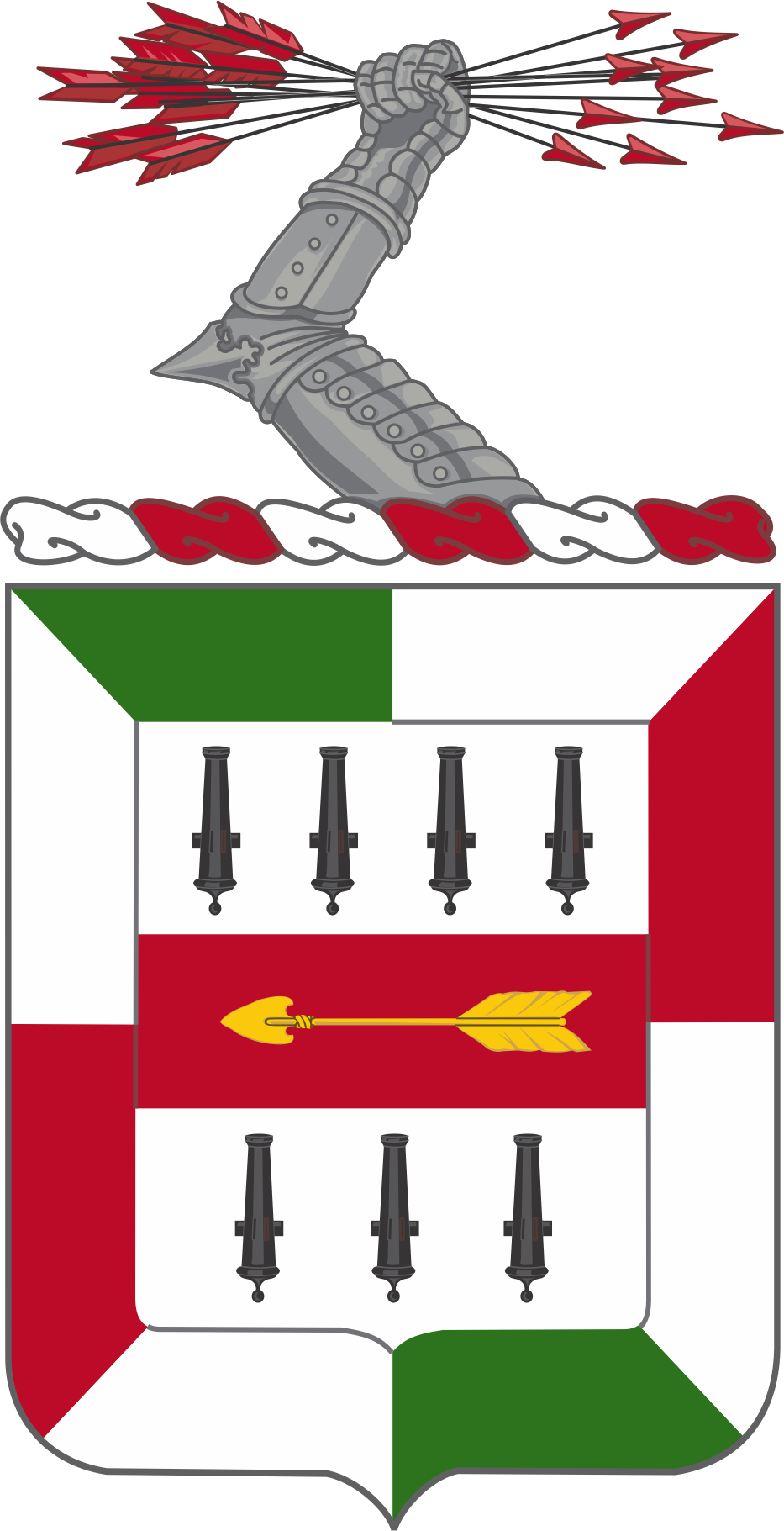
- Coat of arms
- Founded: 1808
- Country: United States
- Branch: United States Army
- Type: Infantry
- Garrison/HQ: Joint Base Lewis-McChord, Washington
- Nickname: Bobcats
- Mottos: "I'll Try, Sir"
- Engagements: War of 1812; Mexican–American War; Utah War; Civil War; Indian Wars; Philippine–American War; World War II; Korean War; Vietnam War; Global war on terrorism
- Decorations: Presidential Unit Citation (2); Valorous Unit Award (2); Army Superior Unit Award; Republic of Korea Presidential Unit Citation (3)

Commanders
- Notable commanders: Nelson A. Miles; Evan M. Johnson; Allen J. Greer; Wilson Burtt; John L. Throckmorton

Insignia
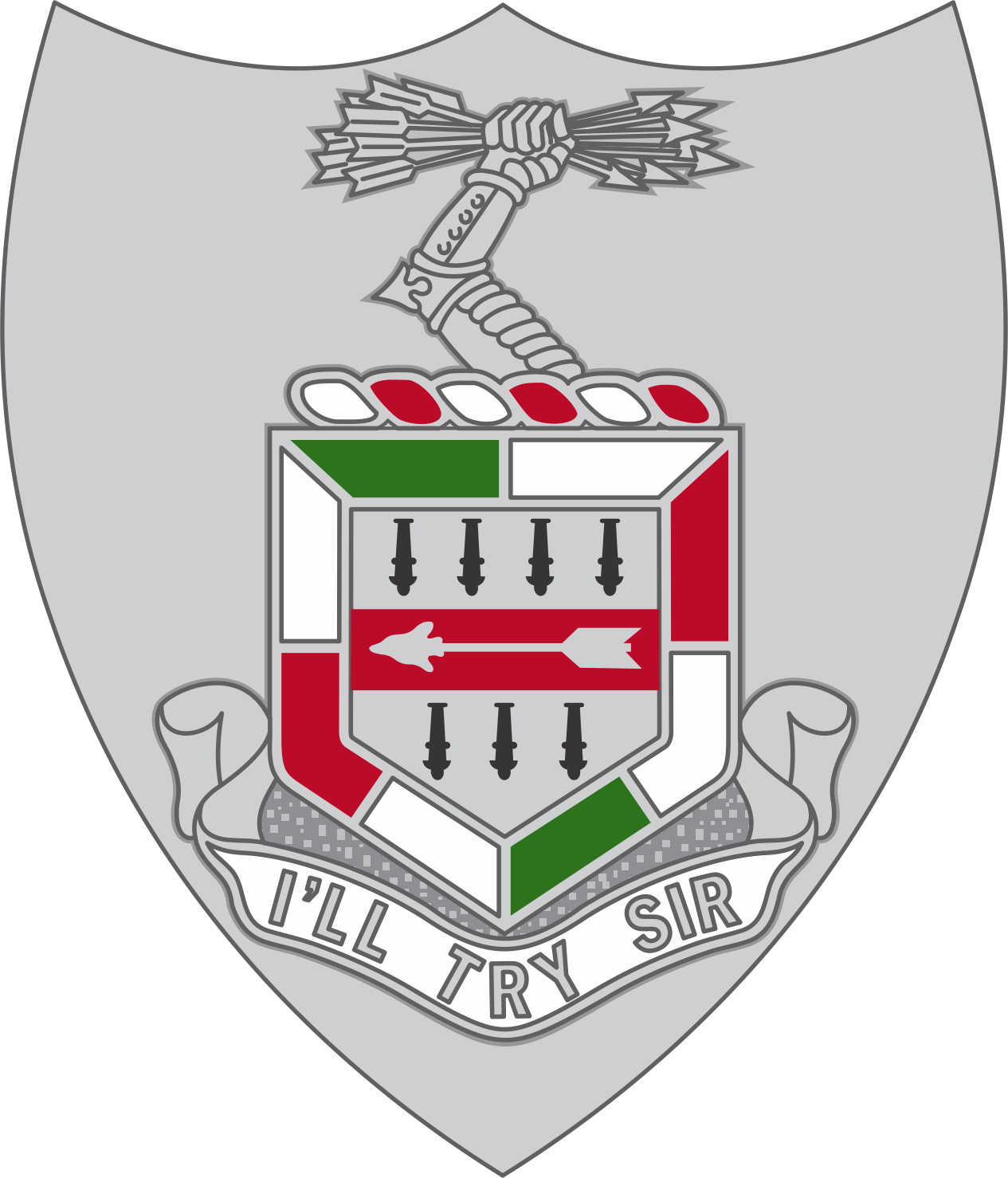
- Distinctive unit insignia

The 5th Infantry Regiment (nicknamed the "Bobcats") is an infantry regiment of the United States Army that traces its origins to 1808.

== Origins: War of 1812 ==
The 5th Infantry Regiment was created by an Act of Congress of 3 March 1815, which reduced the Regular Army from the 46 infantry and 4 rifle regiments it fielded in the War of 1812 to a peacetime establishment of 8 infantry regiments (reduced to 7 in 1821). The Army's current regimental numbering system dates from this act.

Six of the old regiments (4th, 9th, 13th, 21st, 40th and 46th) were consolidated into the new 5th Regiment, which was organized on 15 May 1815 under the command of Colonel James Miller. The current 5th Infantry traces its actual origins to the oldest of these regiments, the 4th, which was organized in May–June 1808. After three years' garrison duty in New England, the 4th assembled near Philadelphia in the spring of 1811. From there it proceeded by way of the Ohio and Wabash rivers to Vincennes, Indiana Territory, reporting to the territorial governor, William Henry Harrison, who assembled a force of volunteers and militia around the 4th. They proceeded into north central Indiana to confront the forces of the Shawnee leader Tecumseh and his brother Tenskwatawa, the Prophet, who attacked on the morning of 7 November in the Battle of Tippecanoe, where they were soundly defeated by U.S. forces.(Previously the old 4th US Infantry had served as the 4th Sub-Legion in Anthony Wayne's Legion of the United States which had fought at the Battle of Fallen Timbers in 1794).

In the spring of 1812, the 4th, commanded by then-Lieutenant Colonel Miller, was ordered to report to Brigadier General William Hull, commander of forces in the Northwest. They reached his headquarters at Detroit on 6 July, two days after being notified of the declaration of war. A week later, Hull's force crossed into Upper Canada, forming a base at Sandwich. On 9 August, marching south to rendezvous with a supply train from Ohio, the 4th fought an inconclusive engagement against a British-Indian force at the Battle of Maguaga. A week after that, Hull surrendered Detroit and his entire command, including the 4th, to an smaller British-Indian force. The 4th marched into captivity at Quebec City where the troops spent a month aboard prison ships in the St. Lawrence River before being exchanged on 29 October. The 4th lost 30 more men during the month's voyage from Quebec to Boston.

The 4th spent the years 1813–14 on the Lake Champlain front, participating in the battles of the Chateauguay (25 October 1813) and Lacolle Mills (30 March 1814) and the siege of Plattsburgh (September 1814).

The new 5th Regiment's other ancestors also saw considerable action.

On the Niagara Frontier, the old 9th Regiment served in Winfield Scott's brigade at the battles of Chippawa (5 July 1814) and Lundy's Lane (25–26 July 1814).

The 21st originally raised by Eleazar Wheelock Ripley was trained to both the US Manual of Arms as well as the British light infantry manual, Ripley felt that the 21st should be able to proficiently perform those skills which won the War of Independence, namely, hit and run and skirmish tactics, skills which was to serve the regiment well later in the war under a new commander. James Miller took over from Ripley in early 1814 after Ripley was promoted to brigadier general and saw the 21st through its most rigorous tests in battle. The 21st fought at York (26 April – 2 May 1813), Sackets Harbor (29 May 1813), as part of Ripley's Brigade at Chippawa, Lundy's Lane and Fort Erie (14 August 1814). At Lundy's Lane, Jacob Brown, the overall U.S. commander, asked Miller if he could take the British artillery on the high ground dominating the battlefield. Miller replied, "I'll try, sir." The 21st proceeded to break the British center and capture the guns with a volley and bayonet charge, holding them until the order to withdraw came from General Eleazar Ripley, with Generals Brown and Scott having been incapacitated by wounds earlier in the battle. "I'll try, sir," became the 5th Infantry's regimental motto.

The lineages of the units above that made up the 5th Infantry give the regiment campaign credit for the War of 1812.

== 1815–1845 ==
The 5th Regiment established headquarters at Detroit in 1815, and began a 30-year period in which it operated in the Upper Midwest, mostly in an area between the current states of Michigan and Nebraska, building and garrisoning a number of posts, protecting the great wave of settlers from native resistance, and serving as a first line of defense in case of another war with Great Britain. Perhaps the 5th's most lasting accomplishment was the construction in 1820–24, of Fort St. Anthony, at the mouth of the Minnesota River. On completion, the Army renamed the post in honor of its commanding officer, Colonel Josiah Snelling. Fort Snelling became the "seed pearl" around which the Twin Cities of Minneapolis and St. Paul grew.

The only noteworthy engagement with Indians during this period was in the Black Hawk War of 1832. Even here, the 5th saw limited action, engaging in combat only in the final act of the war, the Battle of Bad Axe on 1–2 August near the modern town of Victory, Wisconsin. Bad Axe was the last major fight between whites and Indians east of the Mississippi other than the Seminole resistance in Florida.

== Mexican–American War ==
On 1 March 1845, three days before he left office, President John Tyler signed a bill establishing an offer by the United States to annex the Republic of Texas, which had broken away from Mexico in 1836, and make it a state. This set off an immediate diplomatic crisis between the United States and Mexico over the southern boundary of Texas. Mexico claimed that the traditional southern boundary of Texas was the Nueces River; the U.S. and Texas claimed it was the Rio Grande, further south. Incoming President James Knox Polk directed Brigadier General Zachary Taylor to form an "Army of Observation" at Corpus Christi, Texas, ostensibly to protect the disputed zone from Mexican invasion. Five companies of the 5th Infantry under the command of Lieutenant Colonel James S. McIntosh reported to Taylor at Corpus Christi on 11 October 1845, two days before Texas voters accepted the annexation offer.

On 9 March 1846, Taylor's army left Corpus Christi to march to the Rio Grande and assert U.S. sovereignty over the expanded area. They arrived on 28 March, across the river from Matamoros and built a fortified camp, Fort Texas, on the site of the modern city of Brownsville, Texas. Taylor also established a supply base 27 miles east at Point Isabel, at the mouth of the river.

The 5th marched with Taylor from Fort Texas to Point Isabel in late April to clear their supply route of Mexican troops. While they were fortifying that base, the Mexican Army of the North laid siege to Fort Texas, beginning a bombardment of the post on 3 May. Taylor's army marched back from Point Isabel and met the enemy on 8 May, at Palo Alto, several miles east of the fort. In the resulting battle, the 5th Infantry broke a charge by Mexican lancers trying to break through to Taylor's supply train. Over night, the Mexicans withdrew to a better defensive position at Resaca de la Palma, which Taylor's army assaulted on the morning of the 9th. After stiff initial fighting, U.S. dragoons overran the Mexican artillery. The 5th and 8th Regiments then led a charge that broke the Mexican center and routed their army.

Taylor's troops relieved Fort Texas, crossed the Rio Grande into undisputed Mexican territory and occupied Matamoros, where they spent most of the summer. In late August Taylor moved south toward Monterrey, arriving on 19 September 1846. The 5th Infantry was assigned to the division of Brigadier General William J. Worth. The Battle of Monterrey began on 21 September. David Twiggs' division assaulted the city, soon finding itself in house-to-house fighting, while Worth's division went around the city, cutting off its communications. On the 23rd, the 5th Infantry captured Fort Soldado, surrounding the Mexican forces. Worth's division also fought its way into the city, contributing to the Mexicans' decision to negotiate. They surrendered the city to Taylor in exchange for a two-month truce.

After Monterrey, the 5th and the other regular regiments in Taylor's command were replaced by volunteers. They returned to Texas to join Major General Winfield Scott's expedition to Veracruz. The whole regiment was now together, though two companies were detached during the march to Mexico City and spent their time defending supply trains from guerilla attacks. Still in Worth's division, the 5th captured Perote on 22 April 1847.

Reaching the outskirts of Mexico City, the 5th was part of the flanking movement that led to the victory at Contreras on 19 August. The following day, they took the right flank in the assault on the bridgehead at Churubusco. The 5th provided storming parties for the assaults on the Molino del Rey on 8 September and Chapultepec Castle on the 13th; the full regiment followed up in the latter seizure. Later on the 13th, the 5th joined in the seizure of the Garita San Cosme, one of the city gates of Mexico City itself. This led to the city's surrender on the 14th.

== 1848–1861 ==
In May 1848, after the United States Senate ratified the Treaty of Guadalupe Hidalgo, the 5th Infantry marched from Mexico City to Veracruz and returned to the United States. They spent 1849–50 in Arkansas and the neighboring Indian Territory, then replaced the 7th Infantry in Texas. In 1851 they were stationed mainly along the upper Brazos River; by 1854 they had moved to Fort McIntosh outside the city of Laredo.

In early 1857 the 5th moved to south Florida, where they spent several months skirmishing with Seminoles in the area around Fort Myers. The 5th left Florida in June for Fort Laramie in modern-day Wyoming, where they took part in the Buchanan administration's expedition against the Mormons. The regiment stayed at Camp Floyd (later Fort Crittenden) in the Great Salt Lake valley until the autumn of 1860, when it moved to New Mexico for operations against the Navajos.

== Civil War ==
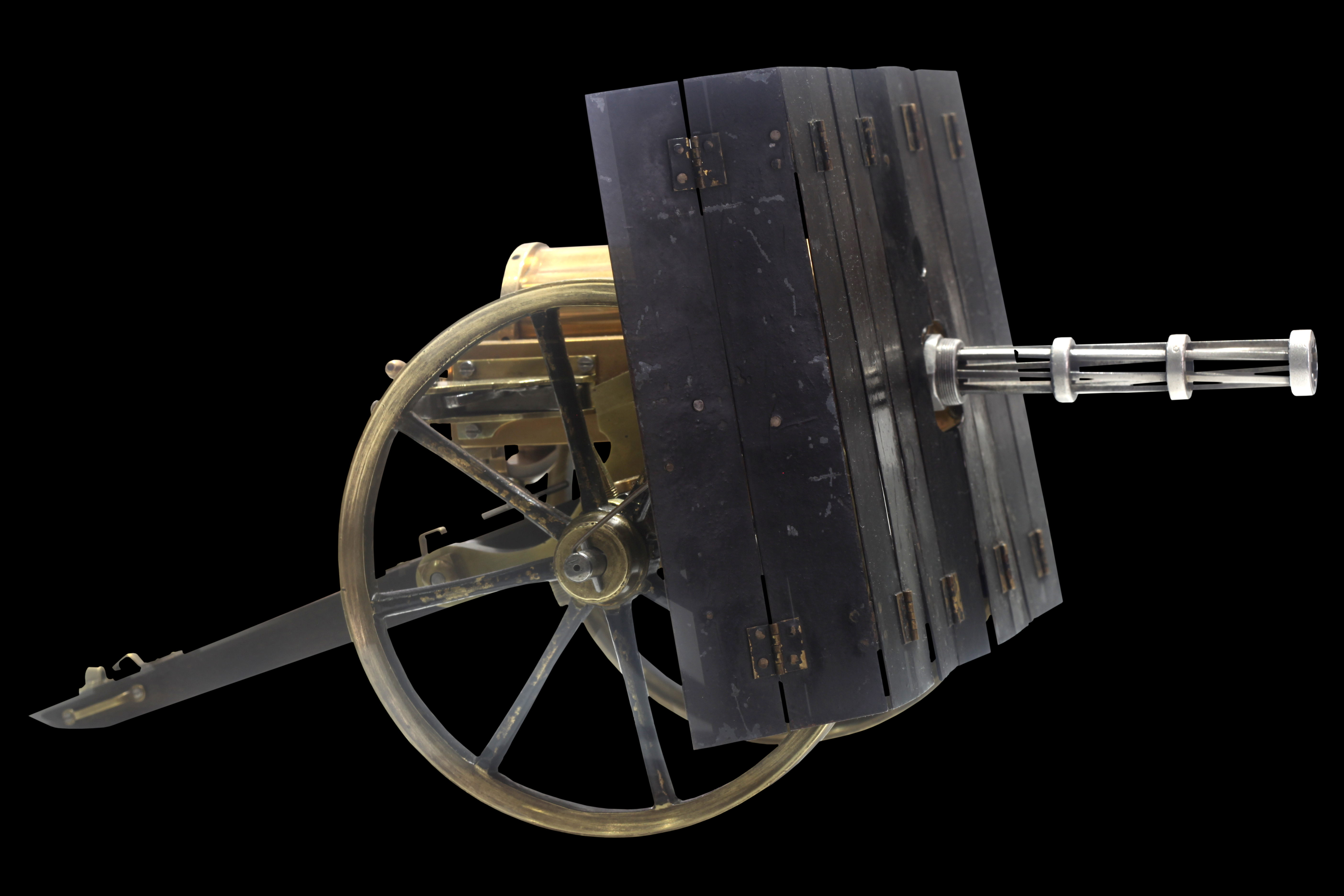
Model of the 4-pounder revolver gun offered to the 5th Infantry Regiment by J.-A. de Brame. on display at the Musée de l'Armée.

The 5th Infantry spent the Civil War in the territory of New Mexico. The regiment was ordered to concentrate at Albuquerque in the spring of 1861 for a move east, but the department commander persuaded Washington to leave the 5th on the frontier.

In late 1861, French inventor J.-A. de Brame had two 4-pounder revolver guns of his design built and offered them to the regiment. The prototype of the weapon is now on display at the National Museum of the Marine Corps, while a 1/6th model that Brame presented to Napoléon III is on display at the Musée de l'Armée in Paris.

In early 1862 a Confederate force from Texas invaded New Mexico. Four companies of the 5th formed the Union rear guard in the Confederate victory at Valverde on 21 February, after which the Confederates occupied Albuquerque and Santa Fe.

Two other companies of the 5th captured a field piece at the Battle of Glorieta Pass on 28 March, the beginning of the end for the Confederate forces. The 5th also fought in the action at Peralta on 15 April where the enemy lost a large part of their supply train. The Confederates ultimately withdrew to San Antonio, and the 5th spent the rest of the war on frontier duty, watching for another Confederate incursion, which never came.

On 1 June 1863 John F. Reynolds officially became colonel of the 5th; however, he was on detached service as a Major General of Volunteers, commanding a corps of the Army of the Potomac. He was killed a month later on the first day of the Battle of Gettysburg. His replacement as commander of the 5th was another volunteer general, Daniel Butterfield, the composer of the bugle call "Taps". Butterfield, also wounded at Gettysburg, did not join the regiment during the war.

== American Indian Wars ==
When the Civil War ended, the 5th Infantry moved from New Mexico to Kansas to provide security for settlers. By October 1868, the regiment manned seven posts across western Kansas, with headquarters at Fort Riley. In March 1869, Colonel and Brevet Major General Nelson A. Miles took command. Over the next dozen years, the regiment under its new commander would take part in many of the major Indian wars of the Great Plains.

=== Red River War ===
From July 1874 to February 1875, Miles led a mixed force of the 5th Infantry and 6th Cavalry in campaigns against the Southern Cheyenne, Comanche and Kiowa Indians along the Red and Washita Rivers in Indian Territory and Texas.

=== Great Sioux War of 1876–77 ===
In the spring of 1876 the largest Indian confederation of the post-Civil War period formed in the northern plains, led by Sitting Bull and Crazy Horse of the Lakota Indians. The Army organized a three-pronged expedition to round up this force, but the Indians scored major victories against two of the three, stopping George Crook's southern pincer at the Battle of the Rosebud on 17 June and destroying half of the 7th Cavalry, vanguard of Alfred Terry's eastern column, at the Battle of the Little Bighorn on 25–26 June.

Reinforcements were rushed in, including the 5th Infantry, which built Fort Keogh at the mouth of the Tongue River in Montana, and began operating from there. Miles and the 5th caught up to Sitting Bull at the Battle of Cedar Creek in late October and, failing to negotiate his surrender, defeated his band in battle, forcing them to abandon most of their food and equipment. 2000 Lakota of this group surrendered on 27 October, although Sitting Bull himself escaped. Three companies of the 5th pursued Sitting Bull along the Missouri River, capturing his camp and scattering his followers on 18 December 1876.

Miles returned to the Tongue River with a force from the 5th and 22nd Infantry to pursue Crazy Horse. They captured several important prisoners in the valley below the Wolf Mountains on 7 January 1877, leading to a confrontation with the main body the following day on 8 January, the Battle of Wolf Mountain. The 5th, attacking superior numbers in near-blizzard conditions, drove the Lakota and Cheyenne force off the high ground, forcing them to retreat. The 5th continued to pursue and round up bands from the broken confederacy into the summer of 1877.

=== Nez Perce War ===
In July 1877 the Nez Perce Indians under Chief Joseph began to march east from Idaho across Montana, pursued by Major General Oliver O. Howard's troops from the Department of the Columbia. Miles was in position to interdict this force, and moved toward them in mid-September with battalions of the 5th Infantry and 7th Cavalry. They attacked the Nez Perces in a valley of the Bear Paw Mountains 30 September, capturing their horses and forcing their surrender on 4 October 1877 in the Battle of Bear Paw.

=== Bannock War ===
The Bannock Indians tried to repeat the Nez Perces' march a year later. A detachment of the 5th attacked their camp on Clark's Fork of the Yellowstone on 4 September 1878 and broke up their incursion. The 5th continued in active pursuit of independent Lakota bands until the surrender of Sitting Bull on 20 July 1881.

=== Garrison Duty ===
After several quiet years, the regiment was transferred to Texas in 1888 and later to points farther east. By 1894, the regiment was dispersed from Texas to Kansas to Florida. With the closing of the frontier, its role had changed from Indian fighting to peacetime garrison duty.

=== Service Award Recipients ===
46 members of the regiment received the Medal of Honor for service during this period:

- First Lieutenant George W. Baird, regimental adjutant, 30 September 1877, Bear Paw Mountain, Montana
- First Lieutenant Frank Baldwin, commanding a scout company, McClellans Creek, Tex., 8 November 1874. This was his second award (one of 19 two-time recipients); first award was during the Civil War (Captain, Company D, 19th Michigan Infantry, Peach Tree Creek, Ga., 12 July 1864)
- Musician John Baker, Company D, October 1876 – January 1877, Cedar Creek, Montana, etc.
- Private Richard Burke, Company G, October 1876 – January 1877, Cedar Creek, Montana, etc.
- Captain Edmond Butler, 8 January 1877, Wolf Mountain, Montana
- Sergeant Dennis Byrne, Company G, October 1876 – January 1877, Cedar Creek, Montana, etc.
- Private Joseph A. Cable, Company I, October 1876 – January 1877, Cedar Creek, Montana, etc.
- Private James S. Calvert, Company C, October 1876 – January 1877, Cedar Creek, Montana, etc.
- First Lieutenant Mason Carter, 30 September 1877, Bear Paw Mountain, Montana
- Captain James S. Casey, 8 January 1877, Wolf Mountain, Montana
- Sergeant Aquilla Coonrod, Company C, October 1876 – January 1877, Cedar Creek, Montana, etc.
- Sergeant William De Armond, Company I, 9 – 11 September 1874, Upper Washita, Texas
- Private John S. Donelly, Company G, October 1876 – January 1877, Cedar Creek, Montana, etc.
- Private Christopher Freemeyer, Company D, 21 October 1876 – 8 January 1877, Cedar Creek, Montana, etc.
- Corporal John Haddoo, Company B, October 1876 – 8 January 1877, Cedar Creek, Montana, etc.
- Sergeant Fred S. Hay, Company I, 9 September 1874, Upper Wichita, Texas
- First Sergeant Henry Hogan, Company G, two awards (one of 19 two-time recipients):

October 1876 – 8 January 1877, Cedar Creek, Montana, etc.
30 September 1877, Bear Paw Mountain, Montana

- Corporal David Holland, Company A, October 1876 – 8 January 1877, Cedar Creek, Montana, etc.
- Private Fred O. Hunt, Company A, October 1876 – 8 January 1877, Cedar Creek, Montana, etc.
- Corporal John James, 9–11 September 1874, Upper Wichita, Texas
- Corporal Edward Johnston, Company C, October 1876 – 8 January 1877, Cedar Creek, Montana, etc.
- Corporal John J. H. Kelly, Company I, 9 September 1874, Upper Wichita, Texas
- Corporal Thomas Kelly, Company I, 9 September 1874, Upper Wichita, Texas
- Private Philip Kennedy, Company C, 21 October 1876 – 8 January 1877, Cedar Creek, Montana, etc.
- Sergeant John W. Knox, Company I, 9 September 1874, Upper Wichita, Texas
- Sergeant William Koelpin, Company I, 9 September 1874, Upper Wichita, Texas
- First Sergeant Wendelin Kreher, Company C, 21 October 1876 – 8 January 1877, Cedar Creek, Montana, etc.
- Second Lieutenant Oscar F. Long, 30 September 1877, Bear Paw Mountain, Montana
- Private Michael McCormick, Company G, 21 October 1876 – 8 January 1877, Cedar Creek, Montana, etc.
- First Lieutenant Robert McDonald, 8 January 1877, Wolf Mountain, 1877
- Private Owen McGar, Company C, 21 October 1876 – 8 January 1877, Cedar Creek, Montana, etc.
- Private John McHugh, Company A, 21 October 1876 – 8 January 1877, Cedar Creek, Montana, etc.
- Sergeant Michael McLoughlin, Company A, 21 October 1876 – 8 January 1877, Cedar Creek, Montana, etc.
- Sergeant Robert McPhelan, Company E, 21 October 1876 – 8 January 1877, Cedar Creek, Montana, etc.
- Corporal George Miller, Company H, 21 October 1876 – 8 January 1877, Cedar Creek, Montana, etc.
- First Sergeant John Mitchell, Company I, 9 September 1874, Upper Washita, Texas
- Private Charles H. Montrose, Company I, 21 October 1876 – 8 January 1877, Cedar Creek, Montana, etc.
- First Sergeant David Roche, Company A, 21 October 1876 – 8 January 1877, Cedar Creek, Montana, etc.
- Private Henry Rodenburg, Company A, 21 October 1876 – 8 January 1877, Cedar Creek, Montana, etc.
- First Lieutenant Henry Romeyn, 30 September 1877, Bear Paw Mountain, Montana
- Private Edward Rooney, Company D, 21 October 1876 – 8 January 1877, Cedar Creek, Montana, etc.
- Private David Ryan, Company G, 21 October 1876 – 8 January 1877, Cedar Creek, Montana, etc.
- Private Charles Sheppard, Company A, 21 October 1876 – 8 January 1877, Cedar Creek, Montana, etc.
- Sergeant William Wallace, Company C, 21 October 1876 – 8 January 1877, Cedar Creek, Montana, etc.
- Private Patton G. Whitehead, Company C, 21 October 1876 – 8 January 1877, Cedar Creek, Montana, etc.
- Corporal Charles Wilson, Company H, 21 October 1876 – 8 January 1877, Cedar Creek, Montana, etc.

== Spanish–American War, Philippine–American War ==
The 5th Infantry did not arrive in time to participate in the Spanish–American War though it performed occupation duties. It saw action in the Philippines during the war of 1900. For service in Philippines, the 5th Infantry was presented one campaign streamer without inscription.

== World War I ==
The 5th Infantry was assigned to the 17th Division in July 1918 at Camp Beauregard, Louisiana, but the war ended before the division could move overseas. On 5 December 1918, the 5th Infantry was relieved of assignment to the division and posted to Camp Zachary Taylor, Kentucky.

== Interwar period ==
The 5th Infantry Regiment was stationed at Camp Zachary Taylor as of June 1919. It was transferred on 10 September 1919 to Camp George G. Meade, Maryland. It departed the port of Hoboken, New Jersey, on 16 October 1919 on the troopship USAT President Grant and arrived in France on 30 October 1919. It was transferred on 6 November 1919 to Andernach, Germany, and was concurrently assigned to the 2nd Brigade, American Forces in Germany (AFG) on the same day. It was relieved from the brigade in December 1921 and assigned to the 1st Brigade. The regiment was relieved on 10 March 1922 from the AFG, sailed from Antwerp, Belgium, on 11 March 1922 on the troopship USAT Cantigny, and arrived at Portland, Maine, on 21 March 1922. The regiment was transferred to Fort Williams, Maine, on the same day, with Companies H and L transferred to Fort Preble, Maine and Fort Constitution, New Hampshire, respectively.

The initial wartime mission of the 5th Infantry Regiment in accordance with established war plans was to conduct a mobile defense of possible amphibious landing areas in support of the Harbor Defenses of Portsmouth. It was assigned to the reconstituted 18th Infantry Brigade, 9th Division, on 24 March 1923. It was relieved from the 9th Division on 15 August 1927 and assigned to the 5th Division; it was relieved from the 5th Division on 1 October 1933 and reassigned to the 9th Division. In 1939, the 18th Infantry Brigade was earmarked as reinforcements for the Panama Canal Zone, and the 3rd Battalion, 5th Infantry sailed 23 October 1939 from Portland on the troopship USAT Chateau Thierry, while the remainder of the regiment sailed 30 October 1939 from Portland on the troopship USAT St. Mihiel and arrived in the Canal Zone 7 November 1939. The entire unit was subsequently transferred to Camp Paraiso. With the pending reactivation and reorganization of the 9th Division into a "triangular" division, the 5th Infantry Regiment was relieved on 1 July 1940 from the 18th Infantry Brigade, relieved on 15 July 1940 from the 9th Division, and assigned to the Panama Mobile Force.

== World War II ==
With the onset of World War II, the 5th Infantry was made a part of the 71st Infantry Division in 1943 and participated in an experiment to develop a "light" infantry division, capable of operating in harsh terrain from the mountains to the desert. The light division was deemed unnecessary for World War II and the 71st Infantry Division was converted back to a regular infantry division. The 5th was sent to Europe in January 1945 with the rest of the division and was in the front lines a month later. Initially taking defensive positions, the 5th was soon on the offensive, driving into Germany. The regiment fought through southern Germany, capturing the cities of Fulda, Bayreuth and Nuremberg. The 5th Infantry was the first U.S. Army unit to cross the Danube River and the first to invade Austria. For its participation in the Second World War, the 5th was presented the following campaign streamers: Rhineland, Central Europe, and American Theater.

== Korean War ==
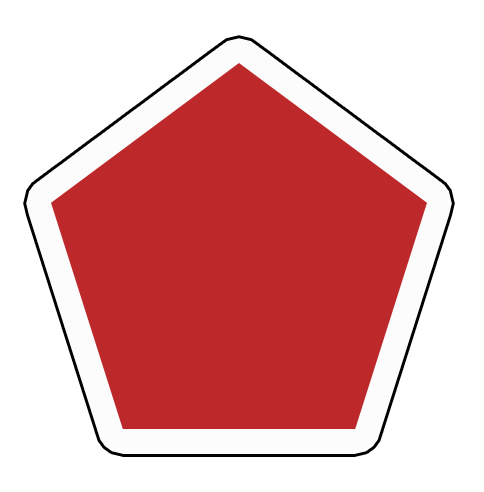
5th Regimental Combat Team SSI 1949-1963

The 5th Infantry performed occupation duty in Austria and Germany for a year after the war, and was inactivated in November 1946. The regiment reactivated in South Korea on 1 January 1949, with personnel and support units from the departing 7th Infantry Division. It constituted the core of the 5th Infantry Regimental Combat Team (RCT) with the mission to provide security while all U.S. troops were withdrawn from the country. The 5th RCT left Korea effective 30 June 1949 and was transferred to Schofield Barracks, Hawaii, where it was when the Korean War began.

It deployed to Korea on 25 July 1950 to reinforce Eighth Army in the shrinking area of United Nations control known as the Pusan Perimeter. In July and August it reinforced the 25th Infantry Division, then the 1st Cavalry Division on the Naktong River line. In September the RCT was attached to the 24th Infantry Division, replacing the 34th Infantry Regiment. It remained with the 24th Infantry Division until January 1952 when it officially became a separate RCT again and was assigned to IX Corps.

The 5th Regimental Combat Team consisted of:

- 5th Infantry Regiment
- 555 Field Artillery Battalion (105 mm) (The "Triple-Nickel")
- 72nd Engineer Company
- 5th Tank Company
- Heavy Mortar Company
- 5th Medical Company
- 5th Aviation Section

Fought in the Battle of Pusan Perimeter.

Three 5th Infantry soldiers received the Medal of Honor for service in Korea:

- Second Lieutenant Carl H. Dodd, Company E, 30–31 January 1951, near Subuk
- Master Sergeant Melvin O. Handrich, Company C, 25–26 August 1950, near Sobuk-San Mountain (posthumous)
- Private First Class Leonard M. Kravitz, Company M, 6–7 March 1951 near Yangpyong (posthumous)

On 11 October 1953, Company A, 1st Section, Machine Gun Platoon, Company D, and Forward Observer Team, 555th Field Artillery Battalion were awarded the Presidential Unit Citation, for actions in the vicinity of Songnae-dong, Korea on 12 June 1953. On 18 November 2005 the award was amended to include the following units:

2nd, 3rd, 5th and 7th Squads, 2d Section Machine Gun Platoon
Recoilless Rifle Platoon
Forward Observers, 81 MM Mortar Platoon, Company D

Actor James Garner (The Rockford Files) served in the 5th RCT during the Korean War, when he was awarded two Purple Hearts.

== Vietnam War ==
In 1959 the 1st Battle Group, 5th Infantry was assigned to the 1st Infantry Division at Fort Riley, Kansas. It was reassigned to the 25th Division on 1 February 1963 and reorganized and redesignated as the 1st Battalion, 5th Infantry on 12 August.

It was sent to Vietnam in January 1966 and it was one of the few mechanized units to serve in that war. One of its first engagements was Operation Circle Pines.

The 1st Battalion, 5th Infantry won a Valorous Unit Award as part of the 2nd Brigade Task Force, 25th Infantry Division, which:

distinguished itself by extraordinary heroism in ground combat against the Viet Cong in the Republic of Vietnam during the period January through April 1966. Ordered to secure a base of operations for itself and the remainder of the 25th Infantry Division in the vicinity of the town Tan An Hoi in the Cu Chi District of Vietnam, the Brigade Task Force embarked on 66 days of continuous combat operations in a completely Viet Cong dominated, heavily entrenched and fiercely defended area. In January 1966, combat operations began to seize, clear and secure the area selected for a base of operations. For the initial four days, brigade combat elements moved forward against devastating automatic weapons and continual harassing sniper fire, well established mine fields and vast underground systems of tunnels, trenches, spider holes and fortifications unrivaled in Vietnam. Displaying extraordinary heroism and unwavering determination, task force elements methodically cleared the area of a fanatical enemy force that was manning the fortifications. This entire action was characterized by numerous acts of personnel sacrifice and heroism. During the period 30 January to 5 April, the Brigade conducted eleven major operations against the Viet Cong with battalion or larger sized forces engaged in fierce battle against a hostile enemy. On 5 April 1966, after 66 days of continuous combat, the Brigade had seized, cleared and secured the base of operations and surrounding area in the vicinity of Cu Chi, Republic of Vietnam. A total of 449 Viet Cong had been killed by body count. Viet Cong activities throughout the Cu Chi District were severely disrupted and the Viet Cong greatly discredited in the eyes of the local populace. During those momentous 66 days, the Brigade displayed utmost courage and indomitable spirit, and as a unit it demonstrated extraordinary heroism as it unwaveringly and unceasingly pitted itself against hard core, experienced, and entrenched and determined enemy forces. The indomitable spirit and extraordinary heroism with which the 2nd Brigade Task Force engaged, battled and defeated a fortified and determined enemy during this period of continuous combat operations is in keeping with the finest tradition of the United States Army and reflects great credit upon all members of the Task Force who participated in the Battle for Cu Chi.

Under the command of Lieutenant Colonel (later Major General) Andrew H. Anderson, the 5th Infantry (Mech) received its third Presidential Unit Citation:

The 1st Battalion (Mechanized), 5th Infantry, 25th Infantry Division and its attached units distinguished themselves by extraordinary heroism in combat operations against numerically superior enemy forces in the Republic of Vietnam from 18 August to 20 September 1968. During this period the 1st Battalion Task Force, through reconnaissance in force, ambush, counterambush, and reaction missions effectively destroyed a regimental-size enemy force and prevented the enemy from seizing the initiative in its "third offensive." The officers and men of the Task Force displayed outstanding bravery, high morale, and exemplary esprit de corps in fierce hand-to-hand combat and counteroffensive action against well disciplined, heavily armed and entrenched enemy forces. An example of the outstanding bravery and aggressiveness occurred 21 August during a reconnaissance in force mission. The lead elements of Company C, 1st Battalion came under heavy mortar, rocket-propelled grenade, machine gun, and automatic weapons fire. The company deployed against the enemy forces while the scout platoon protected the company flank and prevented reinforcement by a battalion-size enemy unit. Through skillful use of close supporting fires from artillery, helicopter gunship and tactical air, the officers and the men of the Task Force repulsed human wave counterattacks and defeated a numerically superior enemy force, which left one hundred and eighty-two dead on the battlefield. The individual act of gallantry, the teamwork and the aggressiveness of the officers and men of the 1st Battalion Task Force continued throughout the period of prolonged combat operations, resulting in the resounding defeat of enemy forces in their operational area. The heroic efforts, extraordinary bravery and professional competence displayed by the men of the 1st Battalion, 5th Infantry and attached units are in the highest traditions of the military service and reflect great credit upon themselves, their units, and the Armed Forces of the United States."

The 5th fought for five years in Vietnam. For its participation in the Vietnam War, the 5th Infantry was presented the following campaign streamers: Counteroffensive, Counteroffensive Phase II, Counteroffensive Phase III, Tet Counteroffensive, Counteroffensive Phase IV, Counteroffensive Phase V, Counteroffensive Phase VI, Tet 69/ Counteroffensive, Summer–Fall 1969, Winter–Spring 1970, Sanctuary Counteroffensive, Counteroffensive Phase VII; Presidential Unit Citation, Ben Cui; Valorous Unit Award, Cu Chi.

In 1975 the 5th Infantry was deployed to Orote Point, Guam. Their mission was to build the first tent city to help process the refugees from Vietnam as part of Operation New Life. They not only built the city, but they also did supplies, cooking, and set up the electricity to maintain the city. Their mission lasted 90 days as part of the 5th Support Group.

Three 5th Infantry soldiers received the Medal of Honor for service in Vietnam:

- First Lieutenant Stephen Holden Doane, Company B, 1st Battalion, 25 March 1969, Hậu Nghĩa Province (posthumous)
- Staff Sergeant Marvin R. Young, Company C, 1st Battalion, 21 August 1968, near Ben Cui (posthumous)
- Sgt Daniel D. Fernández, Company C, 1st Battalion, 18 February 1966, Củ Chi District, Hậu Nghĩa Province (posthumous)

== 1975 to present ==
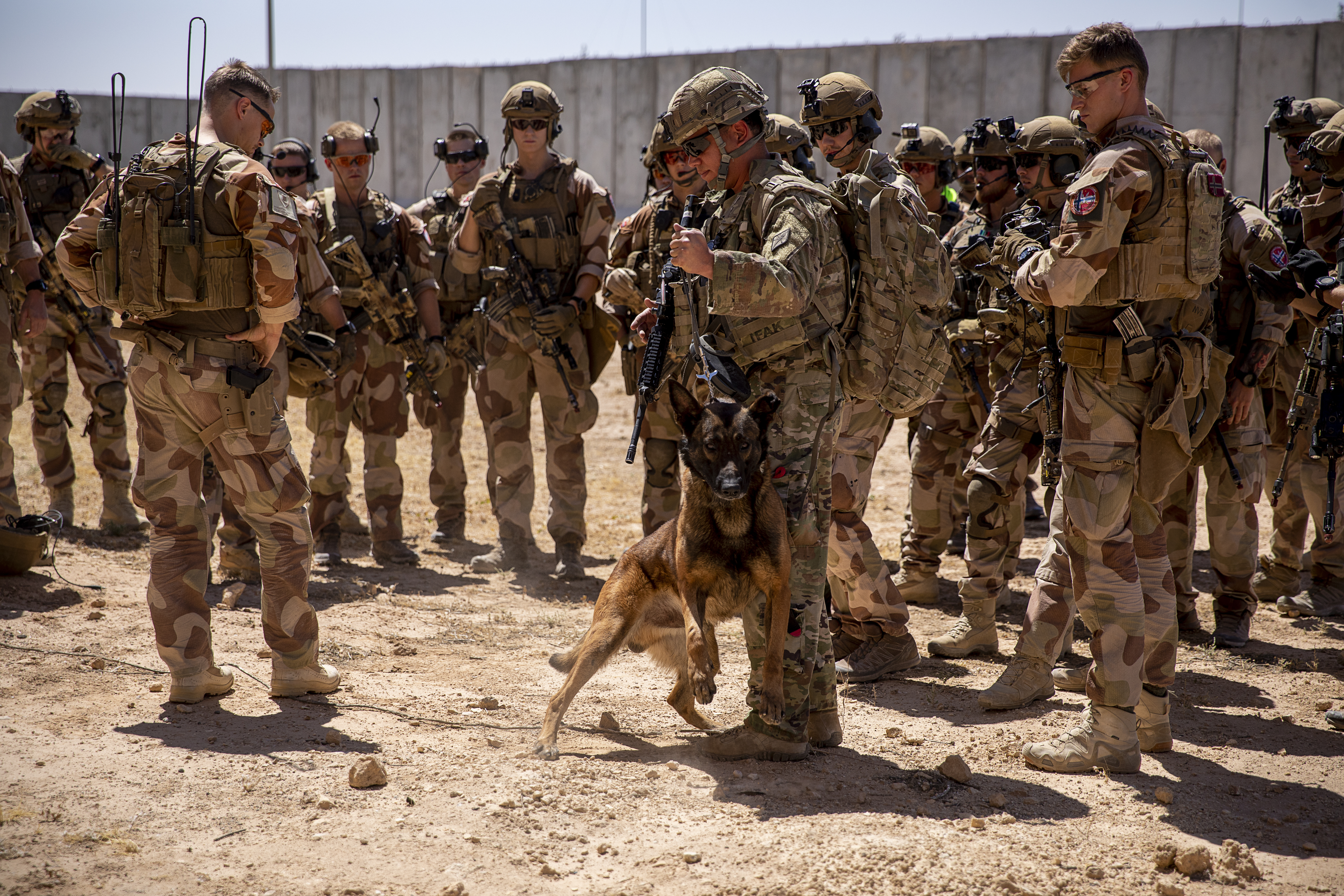
Soldiers of the 1st Battalion, 5th Infantry Regiment and Norwegian soldiers of the Telemark Battalion at Al Asad Airbase in Iraq, June 2020

After the Vietnam War the 1st Battalion, 5th Infantry returned to Hawaii where it served with the 25th Infantry Division until the late 1980s when it spent a brief period located at Camp Howze/Camp Edwards East with the 2nd Infantry Division in Korea.

The 1st Battalion, 5th Infantry was active at Camp Howze Korea as part of 3rd Brigade, 2nd Infantry Division from 1987 to August 1990, when it moved temporarily to Warrior Base to assume a three-month Korean Demilitarized Zone (DMZ) mission, and moved the remainder of its assets to Camp Hovey. The unit was probably active prior to 1989 in 3rd Bde. In 1992 3rd Bde was deactivated at Camp Howze. The battalion was active at Camp Hovey, Korea, as part of 2nd Bde 2nd Infantry Division from October 1990 to 1996 where it moved from Camp Howze after its 1990 DMZ mission.

In August 1995 the 1st Battalion, 5th Infantry Regiment was reassigned to Fort Lewis, Washington, as part of the 1st Brigade "Lancers," 25th Infantry Division (Light). In 1996 the 1st Battalion, 5th Infantry participated in the Advanced Warfighting Experiment, which culminated with a National Training Center rotation in March 1997. The battalion received the Army Superior Unit Award for its outstanding contribution to the Advanced Warfighting Experiment. For its participation in the Advanced Warfighting Experiment the 1st Battalion, 5th Infantry was presented with the Army Superior Unit Award, 1996–1997.

The 2nd Battalion, 5th Infantry was reactivated on 16 August 1995 and assigned to the 3rd Brigade, 25th Infantry Division. The 2nd Battalion served a one-year tour of duty in Afghanistan from May 2004 to May 2005 as part of the 25th Division's Task Force Bronco. For its service in Afghanistan, the 2nd Battalion, 5th Infantry was awarded a Meritorious Unit Commendation. As part of the modular conversion of the 25th Infantry Division, the 2nd Battalion was inactivated on 16 November 2005.

In early 2002 the 1st Brigade "Lancers" began its conversion from a light infantry brigade to a Stryker brigade. It began a one-year tour of duty in Iraq in October 2004 where they participated in Operation Phantom Fury. The brigade returned to Fort Lewis in September 2005. The 1st Brigade was temporarily inactive from June–October 2006.

In September 2011, the 3rd Brigade of the 1st Armored Division deployed to Afghanistan. 2nd Battalion, 5th Infantry Regiment was responsible for operations in southern Wardak Province until July 2012.

In December 2013, 2nd Battalion, 5th Infantry Regiment once again deployed to Afghanistan, this time to Herat province. On 6 May 2014, the Battalion Command Sergeant Major, CSM Martin Barreras, was wounded in action during an engagement with enemy personnel. He later died from his injuries.

In September 2019, 1-5IN deployed to Iraq.

The 1st Battalion, 5th Infantry Regiment is now part of the 1st Infantry Brigade Combat Team, 11th Airborne Division.

== Regimental lineage ==
1. Constituted 12 April 1808 in the Regular Army as the 4th Infantry
2. Organized May–June 1808 in New England
3. Consolidated May–October 1815 with the 9th and 13th Infantry (both constituted 11 January 1812), the 21st Infantry (constituted 26 June 1812), the 40th Infantry (constituted 29 January 1813), and the 46th Infantry (constituted 30 March 1814) to form the 5th Infantry
4. Consolidated in June 1869 with one half of the 37th Infantry (see ANNEX) and consolidated unit designated as the 5th Infantry
5. Assigned 27 July 1918 to the 17th Division
6. Relieved 10 February 1919 from assignment to the 17th Division
7. Assigned 24 March 1923 to the 9th Division
8. Relieved 15 August 1927 from assignment to the 9th Division and assigned to the 5th Division
9. Relieved 1 October 1933 from assignment to the 5th Division and assigned to the 9th Division
10. Relieved 15 July 1940 from assignment to the 9th Division
11. Assigned 10 July 1943 to the 71st Light Division (later redesignated as the 71st Infantry Division)
12. Relieved 1 May 1946 from assignment to the 71st Infantry Division
13. Inactivated 15 November 1946 in Germany.
14. Activated 1 January 1949 in Korea
15. Assigned 10 October 1954 to the 71st Infantry Division
16. Relieved 25 August 1956 from assignment to the 71st Infantry Division
17. Assigned 1 September 1956 to the 8th Infantry Division
18. Relieved 1 August 1957 from assignment to the 8th Infantry Division and reorganized as a parent regiment under the Combat Arms Regimental System
19. Withdrawn 16 April 1987 from the Combat Arms Regimental System and reorganized under the United States Army Regimental System
20. 1st Battalion 5th Infantry Regiment stationed Ft. Lewis Washington (Known between January 1999 and July 2005)
21. 5th Battalion 14th Infantry Regiment "Golden Dragons" reflagged and activated as 2nd Battalion 5th Infantry Regiment "Bobcats" July 1995.
22. Assigned Charlie Company, Heavy Weapons Platoon, 2nd Battalion 5th Infantry Regiment 5 July 1999.
23. Reassigned Headquarters Company 2nd Battalion 5th Infantry Regiment 19 July 1999.
24. 2nd Battalion 5th Infantry Regiment "Bobcats", 2nd Battalion 27th Infantry Regiment "Wolfhounds", 2nd Battalion 35th Infantry Regiment "Cacti" make up 3rd Brigade 25th Infantry Division (Light).
25. HHC "Vipers", Alpha Company "Quickstrike", Bravo Company "Bushmasters", Charlie Company "Cobras".
26. 613 Man Battalion as of 20 February 2003.
27. Deployed to Afghanistan.
28. Returns to Hawaii in 2004 after a year in Afghanistan.
29. 27 July 2005 unit deactivated.
30. 27 July 2005 1st Battalion 5th Infantry Regiment reassigned, stationed at Ft. Wainwright, Alaska.
31. 16 August 2009 2d Battalion 5th Infantry Regiment activated, stationed at Ft. Bliss, Texas.

=== Annex ===
1. Constituted 3 May 1861 in the Regular Army as the 3d Battalion, 19th Infantry
2. Organized May 1865 – September 1866 at Fort Wayne, Michigan; Newport Barracks, Kentucky; and Fort Columbus, New York
3. Reorganized and redesignated 23 November 1866 as the 37th Infantry
4. One half of the 37th Infantry consolidated in June 1869 with the 5th Infantry and consolidated unit designated as the 5th Infantry (remaining half of the 37th Infantry consolidated August–December 1869 with the 3d Infantry and consolidated unit designated as the 3d Infantry—hereafter separate lineage)

== Honors ==
=== Campaign participation credit ===
- War of 1812
1. Canada
2. Chippewa
3. Lundy's Lane
- Mexican–American War
1. Palo Alto
2. Resaca de la Palma
3. Monterey
4. Churubusco
5. Molino del Rey
6. Chapultepec
7. Vera Cruz 1847
- Civil War
1. New Mexico 1862
- Indian Wars
1. Tippecanoe
2. Seminoles
3. Comanches
4. Little Big Horn
5. Nez Perces
6. Bannocks
7. New Mexico 1860
8. Montana 1879
9. Montana 1880
10. Montana 1881
11. Montana 1887
- Philippine Insurrection
1. Streamer without inscription
- World War II
1. American Theater, Streamer without inscription;
2. Rhineland
3. Central Europe
- Korean War
1. UN Defensive
2. UN Offensive
3. CCF Intervention
4. First UN Counteroffensive
5. CCF Spring Offensive
6. UN Summer–Fall Offensive
7. Second Korean Winter
8. Korea, Summer–Fall 1952
9. Third Korean Winter
10. Korea, Summer 1953
- Vietnam
1. Counteroffensive
2. Counteroffensive, Phase II
3. Counteroffensive, Phase III
4. Tet Counteroffensive
5. Counteroffensive, Phase IV
6. Counteroffensive, Phase V
7. Counteroffensive, Phase VI
8. Tet 69/Counteroffensive
9. Summer–Fall 1969
10. Winter–Spring 1970
11. Sanctuary Counteroffensive
12. Counteroffensive, Phase VII
- War on Terrorism
1. Operation Iraqi Freedom (1st Battalion)
2. Operation Enduring Freedom Afghanistan (1st and 2nd Battalions)

=== Decorations ===
U.S. military decorations

1. Presidential Unit Citation (Army) for CHINJU
2. Presidential Unit Citation (Army) for SONGNAE-DONG
3. Presidential Unit Citation (Army) for BEN CUI 1968
4. Valorous Unit Award for CU CHI DISTRICT
5. Valorous Unit Award for NINEVEH PROVINCE 2005
6. Army Superior Unit Award for 1996–1997
7. Meritorious Unit Citation (1st Battalion) Iraq OIF 3
8. Meritorious Unit Citation (2nd Battalion) for Afghanistan

Foreign decorations

1. Republic of Korea Presidential Unit Citation for KOREA 1950–1952
2. Republic of Korea Presidential Unit Citation for KOREA 1950–1953
3. Republic of Korea Presidential Unit Citation for KOREA 1952–1954
4. Republic of Vietnam Cross of Gallantry with Palm for VIETNAM 1966–1968
5. Republic of Vietnam Cross of Gallantry with Palm for VIETNAM 1968–1970
6. Republic of Vietnam Civil Action Honor Medal, First Class for VIETNAM 1966–1970

== See also ==
- List of United States Regular Army Civil War units
