= Eclipse Award =

American Thoroughbred horse racing award

The Eclipse Award is an American Thoroughbred horse racing award named after the 18th-century British racehorse and sire, Eclipse.

An Eclipse Award Trophy is presented to the winner in each division. The trophy is made by a few small selected American foundries with expertise in studio bronze casting. It is then mounted on the hand-crafted native Kentucky walnut base to comprise the Eclipse Award on which a brass plate recites the award winner.

The equivalent award in Australia is the Australian Thoroughbred racing awards, in Canada the Sovereign Awards, and in Europe, the Cartier Racing Awards.

== 1971–present ==
The Eclipse Awards were created by three independent bodies in 1971 to honor the champions of the sport. Due to conflicting award winners for Horse of the Year in five years from 1949 to 1970, racing executive J.B. Faulconer gathered the interests of Daily Racing Form and the Thoroughbred Racing Associations (TRA), making them compromise on a unified set of awards, which would be called the Eclipse Awards.

Although widely viewed as a national standard, they are not an official national award as Thoroughbred racing in the United States has no sport governing body. The Eclipse Awards selections are made by the National Thoroughbred Racing Association, Daily Racing Form and the National Turf Writers Association who select all finalists at the end of the year. Those same voters then vote any of the three finalists in each category.

Winners are announced in January of the next year. J. B. Faulconer, the first full-time publicity director at Keeneland, is credited with starting the Eclipse Award program. The Lexington, Kentucky artist and sculptor Adalin Wichman designed the Eclipse Award, each of which is individually cast in the traditional lost wax method and is hand finished.

The Eclipse Awards are supported by official partners which in recent years has expanded significantly and in 2019 The Jockey Club became one of them.

== 1936–1971 ==
Prior to creation of the Eclipse Awards, the Thoroughbred Racing Associations of North America and the Daily Racing Form each published their own opinion of annual champions.

== 1887–1935 ==
For more than a century, annual champions have been chosen by various bodies and these have been compiled and condensed with Eclipse Award winners by The Blood-Horse magazine. Majority owner The Jockey Club states that "BloodHorse magazine is the flagship publication" and that its "mission is to serve the Thoroughbred owner and breeder with integrity." According to ESPN, The Blood-Horse is the thoroughbred industry's most-respected trade publication. The National Museum of Racing and Hall of Fame Website is among the initiatives and organizations supported by The Jockey Club. The National Museum of Racing and Hall of Fame uses the 1887-1935 Champions published by The Blood-Horse when referencing champions in the biography of its inductees. Churchill Downs Incorporated annually published a list of champions in which they state that "Champions prior to 1936 were selected retrospectively by a panel of experts as published by The Blood-Horse magazine." In his 2007 book titled Masters of the Turf: Ten Trainers Who Dominated Horse Racing's Golden Age, author and Thoroughbred racing historian Edward L. Bowen used the 1887-1935 Champions published by The Blood-Horse when referencing champions of that era.

== Thoroughbred Heritage ==
As well, Thoroughbred Heritage has their own list of "Champions of the Turf" with many from much earlier years based on a retrospective assessment by their own experts.

== Eclipse Award categories ==
1. American Horse of the Year
2. American Champion Two-Year-Old Male Horse
3. American Champion Two-Year-Old Filly
4. American Champion Three-Year-Old Male Horse
5. American Champion Three-Year-Old Filly
6. American Champion Older Dirt Male Horse
7. American Champion Older Dirt Female Horse
8. American Champion Sprint Horse
9. American Champion Female Sprint Horse
10. American Champion Male Turf Horse
11. American Champion Female Turf Horse
12. American Champion Steeplechase Horse
13. Outstanding Owner
14. Outstanding Breeder
15. Outstanding Trainer
16. Outstanding Jockey
17. Outstanding Apprentice Jockey
18. Eclipse Special Award
19. Eclipse Award of Merit
20. National Thoroughbred Racing Association Moment of the Year
