= Damita Jo DeBlanc =

American singer (1930–1998)

Background information
- Born: August 5, 1930; Austin, Texas, U.S.
- Died: December 25, 1998 (aged 68) Baltimore, Maryland, U.S.
- Genres: Traditional pop; Vocal jazz

Damita Jo DeBlanc (August 5, 1930 – December 25, 1998), known professionally as Damita Jo, was an American singer and comedian. Her second marriage was to her manager James "Biddy" Wood in 1961.

== Biography ==
DeBlanc was born in Austin, Texas, United States. She was the featured vocalist on albums by Steve Gibson and the Red Caps during the 1950s. She later married Gibson, but they parted ways professionally and personally in 1959. The couple had a daughter, Stephanie Latrelle Gibson born April 12, 1955, who carried on the family's musical tradition as a singer and pianist. Her lessons began at the age of 4. She married Nathan Fred Shelton of West Virginia, and had twin boys, Bruce Thomas Shelton and Brian Stephen Shelton in Montclair, New Jersey.

Credited as Damita Jo, DeBlanc had some chart success in the early 1960s with two answer songs: 1960's "I'll Save the Last Dance for You" (an answer to "Save the Last Dance for Me") and 1961's "I'll Be There" (an answer to "Stand by Me"). Both songs were originally sung by Ben E. King (the former with the Drifters) and made the R&B top 20, and "I'll Be There" also reached number 12 on the pop chart. In 1962 she recorded "Dance with a Dolly (With a Hole in her Stocking)", previously made famous by the Andrews Sisters and Bill Haley, for Mercury Records. In 1966 she had a minor hit with a cover of the Jacques Brel song "If You Go Away." She was successful in Sweden, where "I'll Save the Last Dance for You" peaked at number 2 (March 1961), "Do What You Want" at number 5 (July 1961) and "Dance with a Dolly (With a Hole in her Stocking)" at number 3 (January 1962).

She worked with Ray Charles, Count Basie, and Lionel Hampton. In 1963, she released a recording for Mercury with Billy Eckstine and the Bobby Tucker Orchestra. She was involved in comedy and toured with Redd Foxx.

In 1998, she suffered a respiratory illness and died on December 25 in Baltimore, Maryland.

It is widely claimed that Katherine Jackson, matriarch of the Jackson family, was a fan of DeBlanc, and named her youngest child Janet Damita Jo Jackson after her.

== Discography ==
=== Albums ===
Year	Title	Label
1961	The Big Fifteen	ABC-Paramount 378 (M) / S-378 (S)
1961	I'll Save the Last Dance for You	Mercury 20642 (M) / 60642 (S)
1962	Damita Jo at the Diplomat	Mercury 20703 (M) / 60703 (S)
1962	Sing a Country Song	Mercury 20734 (M) / 60734 (S)
1963	This One's for Me	Mercury MG 20818 (M) / WC 16333 (S)
1965	This Is Damita Jo	Epic LN 24131 (M) / BN 26131 (S)
1965	Go Go with Damita Jo	RCA Camden CAL-900 (M) / CAS-900 (S)
1965	Damita Jo Sings	Vee-Jay LP-1137(M) / LPS-1137 (S)
1966	Midnight Session	Epic LN 24202(M) / BN 26202 (S)
1967	If You Go Away	Epic LN 24244(M) / BN 26244 (S)
1968	Miss Damita Jo	Ranwood 8037

=== Singles ===
Year	"A" Side	"B" Side	US Pop	US CB Pop	US R&B	Label	Release date
1952	"I'd Do It Again"	"I Don't Care"	--	--	--	RCA Victor – 47-5022	October 1952
1953	"Missing (One Heart)"	"The Widow Walk"	--	--	--	RCA Victor 47-5253	January 1953
1960	"I'll Save The Last Dance For You"	"Forgive"	22	17	16	Mercury 71690	October 1960
1961	"Keep Your Hands Off Of Him"	"Hush, Somebody's Calling My Name"	75	74	--	Mercury 71760	January 1961
1961	"Do What You Want"	"Sweet Georgia Brown"	--	114	--	Mercury 71793	March 1961
1961	"I'll Be There"	"Love Laid Its Hands On Me"	12	30	15	Mercury 71840	June 1961
1961	"Dance With a Dolly (With a Hole in Her Stocking)"	"You're Nobody 'Til Somebody Loves You"	105	123	--	Mercury 71871	September 1961
1962	"You're Nobody 'Til Somebody Loves You" (Part 1)	(Part 2)	--	--	--	Mercury 71944	September 1961
1962	"Tennessee Waltz"	"The Window Up Above"	--	128	--	Mercury 72019	July 1962
1963	"Stop Foolin'" (with Brook Benton)		108	87	--	Mercury 72207	October 1963
1963		"Baby, You've Got It Made" (with Brook Benton)	111	133	--	Mercury 72207	October 1963
1965	"Silver Dollar"		--	104	--	Epic 9766	February 19, 1965
1965		"Tomorrow Night"	--	88	--	Epic 9766	February 19, 1965
1966	"If You Go Away"	"When The Fog Rolls in To San Francisco"	62	77	--	Epic 10061	August 19, 1966

== Filmography ==
- 2009 Damita Jo: The Lady is a Tramp (Arkadia Jazz DVD)
