= Edward Johnston (Medal of Honor) =

American soldier in the U.S. Army

- Born: February 8, 1844; Penn Yan, New York, United States
- Died: January 20, 1920 (aged 75); Penn Yan, New York
- Burial place: Lakeview Cemetery
- Military career
- Allegiance: United States of America
- Branch: United States Army
- Service years: c. 1876–1878
- Rank: Sergeant
- Unit: 5th U.S. Cavalry
- Conflicts: Indian Wars; Great Sioux War of 1876-77
- Awards: Medal of Honor

Edward Johnston (February 8, 1844 – January 20, 1920) was an American soldier in the U.S. Army who served with the 5th U.S. Cavalry during the Indian Wars. He was one of thirty-one men received the Medal of Honor for gallantry during General Nelson A. Miles winter campaign against the Sioux in the Montana Territory from October 21, 1876, to January 8, 1877.

== Biography ==
Edward Johnston was born in Penn Yan, New York on February 8, 1844. He enlisted in the U.S. Army in Chicago, Illinois and joined the 5th U.S. Cavalry where he eventually became a sergeant. Assigned to frontier duty in the Montana Territory, Johnston took part in General Nelson A. Miles winter campaign against the Sioux from October 21, 1876, to January 8, 1877. He fought at several major engagements during this time, most notably, at the Battle of Cedar Creek on October 21, 1876. He was one of the thirty-one men in his regiment who received the Medal of Honor for "gallantry in action". After leaving the military, Johnston returned to his hometown where he died on January 20, 1920, at the age of 75. He was interred at Lakeview Cemetery.

== Medal of Honor citation ==
Rank and organization: Corporal, Company C, 5th U.S. Infantry. Place and date: At Cedar Creek, etc., Mont., October 1876 to 8 January 1877. Entered service at: Buffalo, N.Y. Birth: Pen Yan, N.Y. Date of issue: 27 April 1877.

Citation:

Gallantry in action.

== See also ==
- List of Medal of Honor recipients for the Indian Wars
