= Lexington History Center =

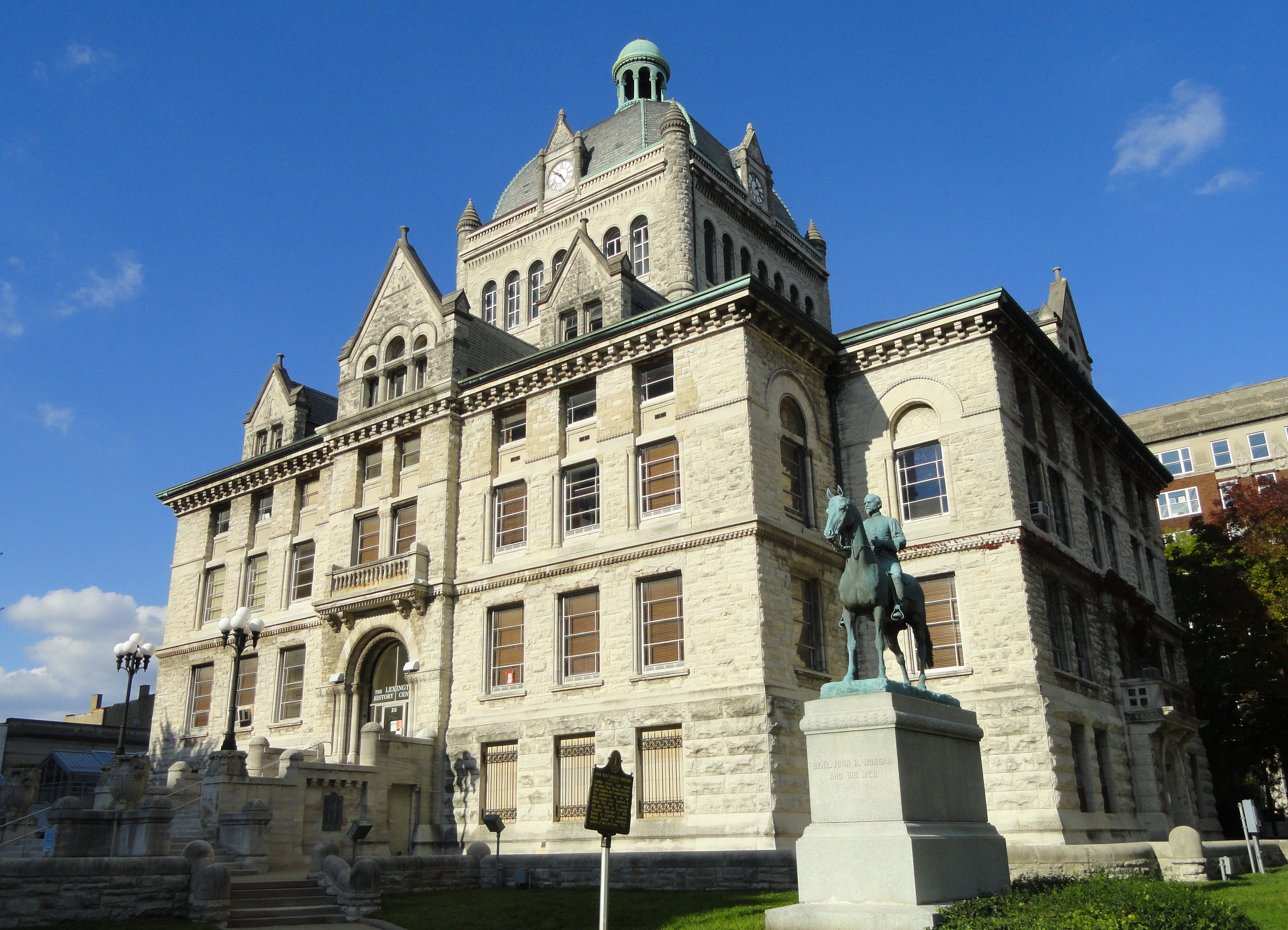

- Location within Kentucky
- Established: October 2003
- Dissolved: July 2012
- Location: 215 West Main Street; Lexington, Kentucky, United States
- Coordinates: 38.047732°N 84.497751°W
- Type: History museum

The Lexington History Center once housed several independent history museums in downtown Lexington, Kentucky. It was located in the former Fayette County Courthouse until 2012 when the city closed the building for renovation. Prior to the closing of the building, the Isaac Scott Hathaway Museum moved to a new location on Georgetown Street. The building has since been renovated into a multi-use commercial, tourist, office and event center.

== Museums ==
The building was opened as a museum center in October 2003 under a Memorandum of Understanding between the Lexington-Fayette Urban-County Government (Lexington, Ky.) and the Commonwealth of Kentucky that stipulated the municipal government would spend a "minimum $1,000,000" to renovate the Old Fayette County Courthouse as the Lexington History Museum—an amount that was never fulfilled. After evicting the Museums (see below) from the building, the city has committed to spending $30 million to renovate the building for commercial space.

The Lexington History Center was formerly host to several museums:

- The Lexington History Museum showcases numerous exhibits regarding Lexington's history, and offers programs tailored to all ages. Following the closure of the history center, the Lexington History Museum utilized empty spaces in downtown and created pocket museums to house its exhibits. The Lexington History Museum reopened to the public on August 26, 2023, at 210 North Broadway in the auditorium of the historic Thomas Hunt Morgan House. This reopening allows the museum to welcome visitors back to the beginning of a reimagined museum.
- The Lexington Public Safety Museum opened on November 20, 2004. The museum features exhibits that explore the history of Lexington's police, fire and corrections and those that gave the ultimate sacrifice and became Fallen Heroes. The Public Safety Museum has not reopened in a new location.
- The Kentucky Renaissance Pharmacy Museum is dedicated to the early history of Bluegrass region pharmacies. It has reopened in Frankfort.
- The Isaac Scott Hathaway Museum, focusing on local African American history.

== See also ==
- Cityscape of Lexington, Kentucky
