= The Bryan Times =

US newspaper

- Type: Daily newspaper
- Format: Broadsheet
- Owner: HD Media
- Publisher: Christopher Cullis
- Language: English
- Headquarters: 127 S. Walnut St., Bryan, Ohio 43506
- Circulation: 7,500
- ISSN: 2333-634X
- OCLC number: 9033845
- Website: bryantimes.com

The Bryan Times is a daily newspaper based in Bryan, Ohio. It came into being on February 2, 1949, as a result of a merger of The Bryan Democrat and The Bryan Press. On September 12, 1949, it became a daily newspaper delivered six days per week, Monday through Saturday.

== History ==
The Bryan Press, a weekly newspaper, had its roots in the Republican Standard of 1854 and the twice-weekly Bryan Democrat which began in 1863. The Bryan Democrat, founded by Robert N. Patterson, held its name through 1949 while the forerunners of The Bryan Press went through a series of name changes until 1869. At the time of the merger The Bryan Press was owned by Paul Van Gundy and Howard Carvin.

In 1923 Cass Cullis came to Bryan when he purchased the Democrat. Cullis had previously owned newspapers in Fayette, Ohio; Swanton, Ohio; and Buchanan, Michigan. Following World War II, Cullis' son, Ford Cullis, joined his father in operating the newspaper. According to Ford, it was evident that Bryan needed a daily newspaper, but World War II slowed the change.

New equipment, parts, and repairs were difficult to get, newsprint was scarce, and skilled help was difficult to find. By early 1948, the Democrat was able to find used equipment in satisfactory condition. The shop had three linotypes and automatic typesetting equipment was available. The real need for the newspaper in 1948 was a press to replace the slow-moving Babcock; this press had a separate folder, requiring hours of extra work. The choice was a Goss Comet purchased from the Celina Daily Standard, owned by the Parker Snyder family. It printed and folded 3,000 copies per hour. It was this press that made a daily newspaper possible. The Bryan Times became the 100th daily newspaper in Ohio.

In 1949 the Times was located at 108 E. Butler Street in Bryan. That building was small and soon became inconvenient since the shop equipment was on the upper floor and the press was in the basement. In 1958 Ford Cullis bought the property at 121–127 South Walnut Street, where the current offices are located. Plans were made for the new building. The pressroom, with a new press and a rotary press purchased from The Defiance Crescent News, was built in 1961. The entire operation was moved to its new location in October 1962. Since the press room was built the building has undergone several expansions, including a new press room and a mailroom.

By 1963 the Times had doubled its circulation to 6,000 and had begun to move its circulation base out into the entire area of Williams County.

In 1968 the Times purchased a 1968 Goss Community offset press, which was used until the printing of the paper was outsourced to Fort Wayne Newspapers in March 2015.

Cass Cullis was the co-publisher of The Bryan Times from 1949 until his death in 1980; Ford Cullis was co-publisher until his death in 2008. Christopher Cullis joined the Times in June 1981 as the assistant publisher and became co-publisher in 1992. Following his father's death in 2008, Christopher Cullis became the sole publisher. In 2010 Kimberly Cullis Imm joined her father as assistant publisher, bringing the Times into its fourth generation of Cullis management.

The weekly Leader Enterprise of Montpelier, Ohio, ended publication with its final issue on the last Wednesday in February, Feb. 27, 2019.

The Bryan Times was owned by the Bryan Publishing Company, which also published the daily Napoleon Northwest Signal, the weekly Montpelier Leader Enterprise, the free distribution, twice-monthly Countyline, and monthly real estate magazine Realty Northwest.

In November, 2022, the assets of Bryan Publishing Company were acquired by AIM Media Midwest, an affiliate of AIM Media Texas. In August 2026, the paper was sold to HD Media.
