= Eclipse Award Trophy =

The Eclipse Award for "Horse of the Year" displayed on the front panel of a brochure provided by the Thoroughbred Racing Association to promote the event of the Eclipse Award Ceremonies

The Eclipse Award Trophy is presented annually to recognize those horses and individuals whose outstanding achievements have earned them the title of Champion in their respective categories. Presently there are twenty categories that include American Horse of the Year, eleven Division Champions, five connection Champions and three miscellaneous awards.

The Eclipse Awards are co-sponsored by the National Thoroughbred Racing Association, the Daily Racing Form and the National Turf Writers Association. Prior to the start of the Eclipse Awards in 1971, the TRA and the Daily Racing Form separately honored racing's annual champions.

== History ==
The Eclipse Awards are named after the great 18th-century English racehorse and sire, Eclipse, who did not begin racing until age five. He was undefeated in 18 starts, including eight walkovers. Eclipse sired the winners of 344 races, three of his get winning the Epsom Derby.

The Eclipse Award Trophy was designed by acclaimed Lexington, Kentucky artist Adalin Wichman in 1971. Wichman based her bronze trophy on an 18th-century painting of Eclipse. Her husband, architect William Wichman, designed the award's walnut base. Ms. Wichman holds the Eclipse copyright and has produced each sculpture, working only with a few small selected American foundries with expertise in studio bronze casting by the lost wax method.

An Eclipse Award Trophy is presented to the winner in each of eleven horse divisions that include;American Champion Two-Year-Old Colt, American Champion Two-Year-Old Filly, American Champion Three-Year-Old Male Horse, American Champion Three-Year-Old Filly, American Champion Older Male Horse, American Champion Older Female Horse, American Champion Sprint Horse, American Champion Female Sprint Horse, American Champion Male Turf Horse, American Champion Female Turf Horse and Outstanding Steeplechase horse. The winner of the Eclipse Award allows the horse in each of the eleven categories to be designated as a "Champion" for the rest of their racing and breeding careers.

Five Eclipse Awards Trophies are presented to humans based on their affiliations to their horses. Those five categories are; Outstanding Owner, Outstanding Breeder, Outstanding Trainer, Outstanding Jockey and Outstanding Apprentice Jockey.

At the end of the Eclipse Award evening the coveted select solid gold Eclipse Award trophy is presented to the American Horse of the Year.

Each statue is hand finished, following the casting, by cleaning, patching, colouring and waxing using classical bronze sculpture finishing techniques by the artist to its final form and luster. It is then mounted on the hand crafted, native Kentucky walnut base to comprise the Eclipse Award on which a brass plate names the award winner.
