= Henry Romeyn =

United States Army Medal of Honor recipient

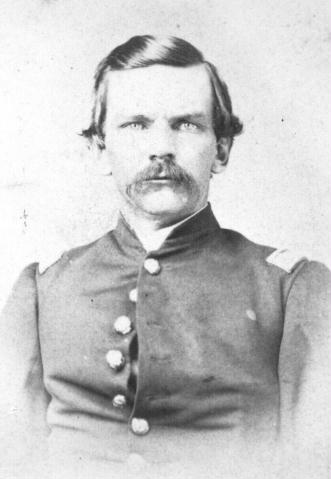
- Photograph of First Lieutenant Henry Romeyn published prior to his retirement in 1897.
- Born: June 1, 1833; Wayne County, New York
- Died: February 21, 1913 (aged 79)
- Burial place: Arlington National Cemetery
- Military career
- Allegiance: United States of America
- Branch: 5th Infantry Regiment (United States)
- Service years: 1862-1897
- Rank: Major
- Units: 105th Illinois Infantry Regiment; 5th Infantry Regiment (United States)
- Conflicts: Indian Wars; Battle of Bear Paw
- Awards: Medal of Honor

Henry Romeyn (June 1, 1833 – February 21, 1913) was a United States Army officer who received the U.S. military's highest decoration, the Medal of Honor.

Major Romeyn was a companion of the District of Columbia Commandery of the Military Order of the Loyal Legion of the United States.

== Medal of Honor citation ==
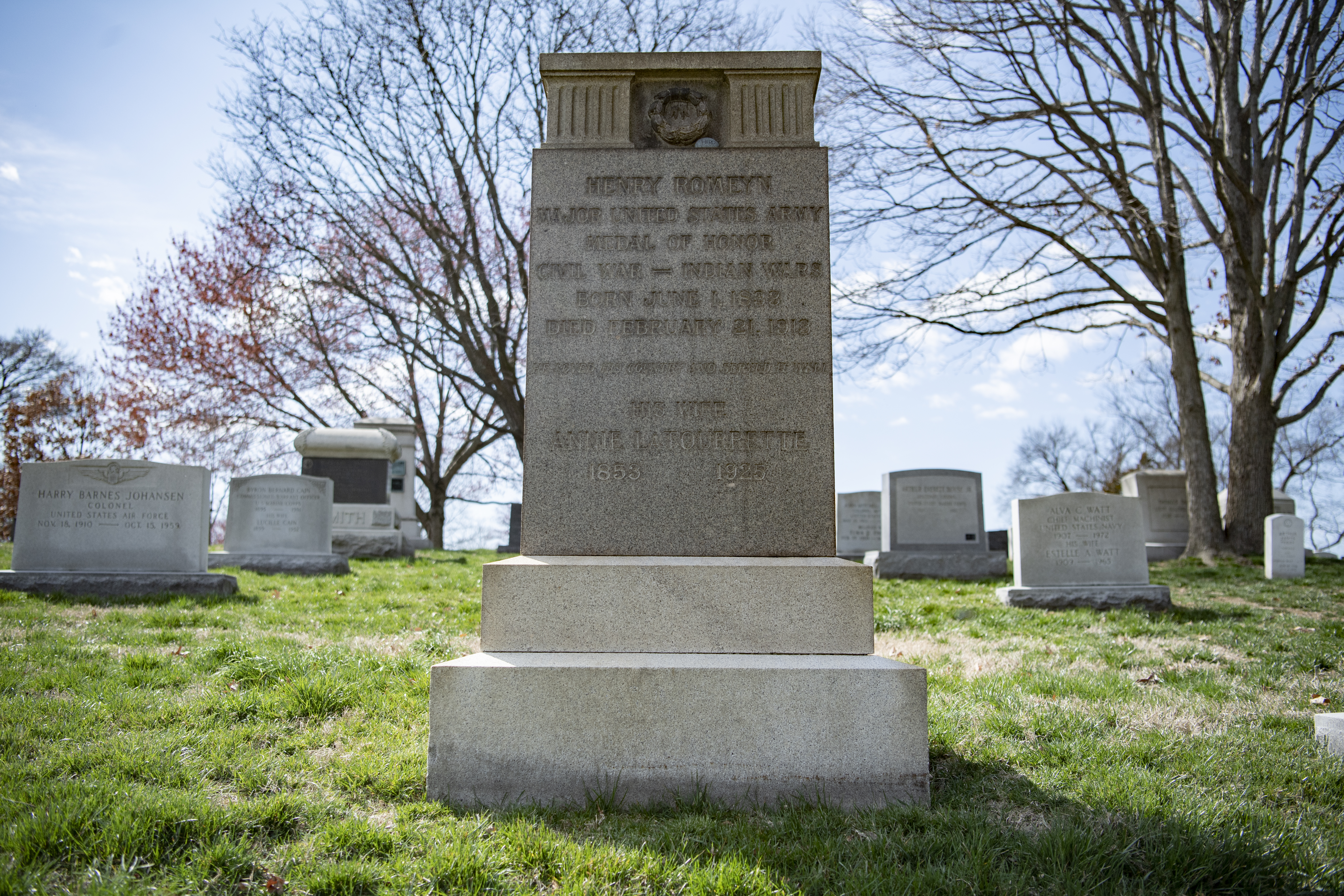
Grave at Arlington National Cemetery

Rank and organization: First Lieutenant, 5th U.S. Infantry. Place and date: At Bear Paw Mountain, Montana. 30 September 1877. Entered service at: Michigan. Birth: Galen, New York. Date of issue: 27 November 1894.

Citation text:

Led his command into close-range of the enemy, there maintained his position, and vigorously prosecuted the fight until he was severely wounded.

== See also ==
- List of Medal of Honor recipients for the Indian Wars
- Medal of Honor
- Battle of Bear Paw
