= Biddy Wood =

American film journalist (1924–2011)

James "Biddy" Wood (April 24, 1924 – October 7, 2011) was a film journalist, promoter, and disc jockey. He reported from Washington, D.C., and edited the Afro-American Newspaper, also reporting on nightlife and jazz activity along Baltimore's Pennsylvania Avenue. He also owned a club and produced newsreels with William D. Alexander.

== Early life and education ==
Wood was born in Lexington, Kentucky, on April 24, 1924. His parents were Francis Marion Wood, the first superintendent of Baltimore City Colored Schools, and Nellie née Hughes Wood. Raised in Catonsville, Maryland, he was nicknamed "Biddy" because he was small in stature as a child.

Wood graduated from Frederick Douglass High School in Baltimore and served in the military as a staff sergeant with the United States Army during World War II. He graduated from Howard University in Washington, D.C. with a degree in Fine Arts.

Wood married Damita Jo DeBlanc, who was one of the performers he managed.

== Career ==
A film journalist, Wood reported from Washington, D.C., and edited the Afro-American Newspaper. He also documented the jazz activity and other nightlife along Baltimore's Pennsylvania Avenue, and researched and produced newsreels with William D. Alexander Wood also owned a jazz club called the Sweet Chariot Gospel Night Club in New York

In his final years, Wood lived in Baltimore's Bolton Hill neighborhood.

== Death ==
Wood died from respiratory failure in the hospice unit of Harbor Hospital Center in Baltimore on October 7, 2011, at age 87. He was preceded in death by his son John Jeffrey Wood.

Wood was interred at the Garrison Forest Veterans Cemetery in Owings Mills, Maryland.
