= Carl H. Dodd =

United States Army Medal of Honor recipient

Carl Henry Dodd
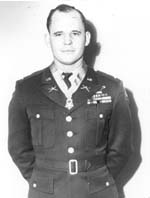
- Born: April 21, 1925; Harlan County, Kentucky, U.S.
- Died: October 13, 1996 (aged 71); Lexington, Kentucky, U.S.
- Burial place: Cumberland Memorial Gardens, Laurel County, Kentucky
- Military career
- Allegiance: United States
- Branch: United States Army
- Service years: 1943–1965
- Rank: Major
- Units: 5th Infantry Regiment, 24th Infantry Division
- Conflicts: World War II; Korean War • Battle of Masan • Operation Thunderbolt
- Awards: Medal of Honor; Silver Star

Carl Henry Dodd (April 21, 1925 – October 13, 1996) was a United States Army soldier and a recipient of the U.S. military's highest decoration, the Medal of Honor, for his actions in the Korean War. He was awarded the medal for conspicuous leadership during the taking of a strongly defended hill as part of Operation Thunderbolt.

== Family and early career ==
Dodd was born to Edward and Ruby Eagle Dodd on April 21, 1925, in the community of Cotes near Evarts, Kentucky. He enlisted in the U.S. Army in 1943 and developed a foot problem while helping train other soldiers. Discharged in March 1946 as a sergeant, Dodd re-enlisted only months later in September.

Dodd married Libbie Rose and had three children, sons Carl Jr. and David and daughter Lorana.

== Korean War ==
Upon the outbreak of the Korean War in 1950, Dodd was sent to Korea with Company E of the 2nd Battalion, 5th Infantry Regiment, 24th Infantry Division.

During the Battle of Masan on August 7, 1950, Dodd (then a master sergeant) earned the U.S. military's third-highest decoration, the Silver Star. When his platoon was overrun near Chindong-ni, he took over for the missing platoon leader and led the twelve remaining soldiers in reestablishing their position. A North Korean attack from all sides followed, and Dodd provided covering fire while the rest of the platoon pulled back, then returned to rescue two men who had been unable to withdraw due to heavy fire. He was awarded the Silver Star on November 13, 1950, for this action. He later received a battlefield commission and assumed the rank of second lieutenant.

Beginning on January 30, 1951, Dodd led his platoon against Hill 256, a strongly defended position near Subuk, Korea, as part of Operation Thunderbolt. Leading from the front despite intense hostile fire, he single-handedly destroyed a machine gun nest and a mortar position while organizing and encouraging his men. The next morning he and his platoon continued their advance and captured the hill. Dodd was subsequently promoted to first lieutenant and, on June 4, 1951, awarded the Medal of Honor for his actions during the fight for Hill 256.

== Later years ==
Dodd retired from the Army in 1965 as a major, ending a 21-year career of military service. He died at age 71 on October 13, 1996, at a Lexington, Kentucky, veterans' hospital. He was buried at Cumberland Memorial Gardens in Laurel County just outside Corbin, Kentucky, where he was residing at the time of his death.

== Medal of Honor citation ==
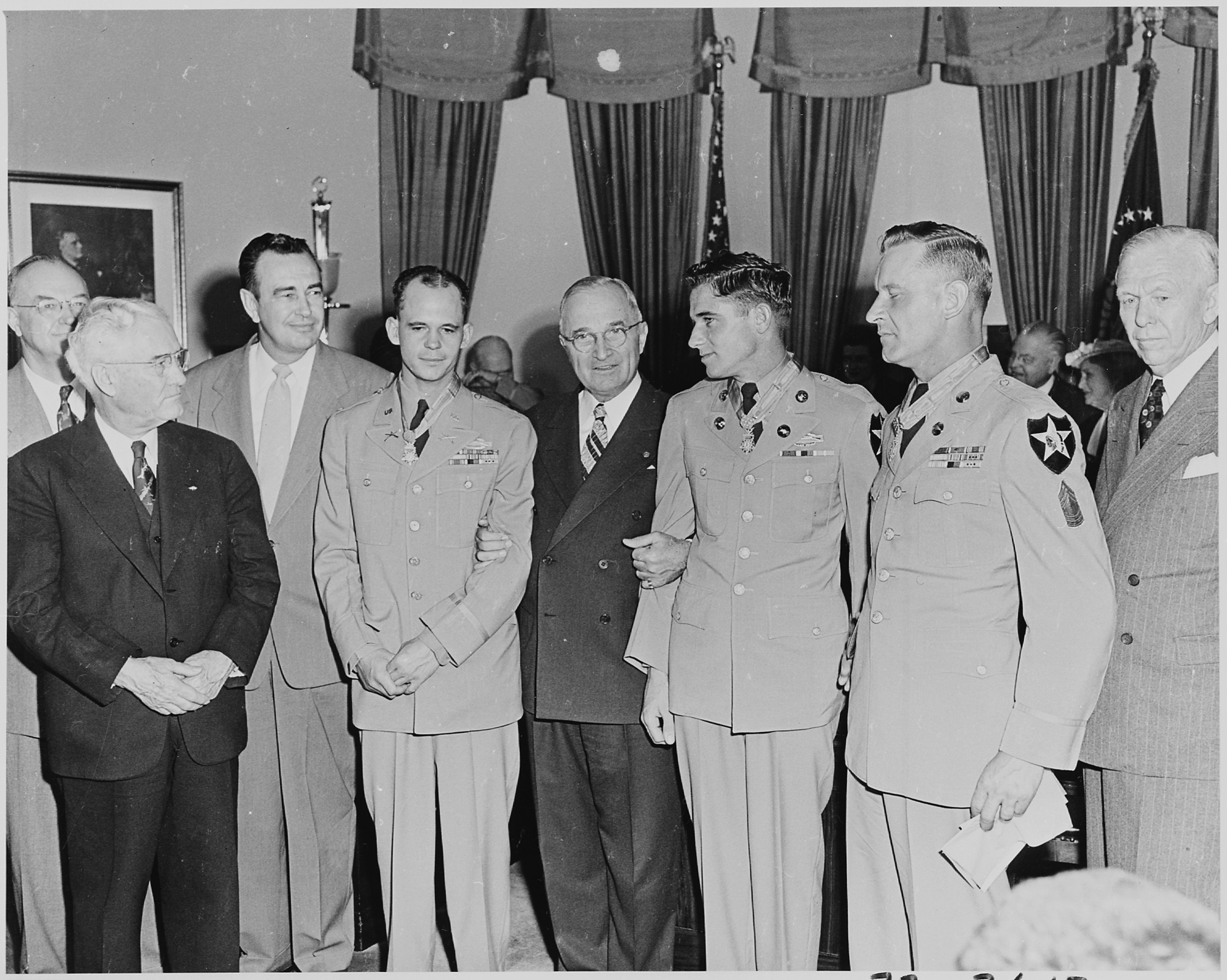
President Harry S. Truman (center) with Dodd, standing to the President's right, and other Medal of Honor recipients shortly after presenting them with their medals.

Dodd's official Medal of Honor citation reads:

1st Lt. Dodd, Company E, distinguished himself by conspicuous gallantry and intrepidity above and beyond the call of duty in action against the enemy. First Lt. Dodd, given the responsibility of spearheading an attack to capture Hill 256, a key terrain feature defended by a well-armed, crafty foe who had withstood several previous assaults, led his platoon forward over hazardous terrain under hostile small-arms, mortar, and artillery fire from well-camouflaged enemy emplacements which reached such intensity that his men faltered. With utter disregard for his safety, 1st Lt. Dodd moved among his men, reorganized and encouraged them, and then single-handedly charged the first hostile machine gun nest, killing or wounding all its occupants. Inspired by his incredible courage, his platoon responded magnificently and, fixing bayonets and throwing grenades, closed on the enemy and wiped out every hostile position as it moved relentlessly onward to its initial objective. Securing the first series of enemy positions, 1st Lt. Dodd again reorganized his platoon and led them across a narrow ridge and onto Hill 256. Firing his rifle and throwing grenades, he advanced at the head of his platoon despite the intense concentrated hostile fire which was brought to bear on their narrow avenue of approach. When his platoon was still 200 yards from the objective he moved ahead and with his last grenade destroyed an enemy mortar killing the crew. Darkness then halted the advance but at daybreak 1st Lt. Dodd, again boldly advancing ahead of his unit, led the platoon through a dense fog against the remaining hostile positions. With bayonet and grenades he continued to set pace without regard for the danger to his life, until he and his troops had eliminated the last of the defenders and had secured the final objective. First Lt. Dodd's superb leadership and extraordinary heroism inspired his men to overcome this strong enemy defense reflecting the highest credit upon himself and upholding the esteemed traditions of the military service.

== Awards and decorations ==

Badge	Combat Infantryman Badge		
1st row	Medal of Honor	Silver Star	Bronze Star Medal
2nd row	Army Good Conduct Medal with 2 Good Conduct Loops	American Campaign Medal	Asiatic-Pacific Campaign Medal
3rd row	World War II Victory Medal	Army of Occupation Medal	National Defense Service Medal with 1 Oak leaf cluster
4th row	Korean Service Medal with 4 Campaign stars	United Nations Service Medal Korea	Korean War Service Medal
Unit awards	Presidential Unit Citation		Korean Presidential Unit Citation

== See also ==
- List of Korean War Medal of Honor recipients
