= Henry Earl =

American folk hero arrested 1,500 times (1949–2024)

- Born: October 24, 1949
- Died: May 2024 (aged 74)
- Other name: James Brown
- Known for: Number of arrests

Henry Earl (October 24, 1949 – May 2024) was an American man known for being arrested approximately 1,500 times, mostly for charges involving the misuse of alcohol.

After his mug shots were posted online, he became an internet folk hero, known for his friendly demeanor and love of dancing.

Following an illness, Earl spent the last seven years of his life in the Owenton Healthcare and Rehabilitation Facility. He died in 2024.

== Life ==
Earl began drinking to cope with the death of his adoptive mother when he was 18 years old. By 1969, he was homeless and unemployed. While on the streets he would perform dance moves for money, earning him the moniker "James Brown", referencing the popular soul singer.

=== Arrests ===
Earl was arrested over 1,500 times, which is the record for the highest number of arrests of an individual in Lexington, Kentucky; he spent over 6,000 days behind bars. Most of his arrests were for public intoxication. Although initially given lighter sentences, allowing him to be arrested dozens of times a year, later sentences would be for months at a time.

=== Publicity ===
Around 2002, the county jail began publishing Earl's mugshots online. In January 2004, Fark.com began linking to the mugshots page, commenting on Earl's wide variety of facial expressions. He soon became the focus of multiple websites and online discussion forums reporting on his arrests and exchanging stories of interactions. The county jail's website crashed multiple times due to the significant increase in traffic; website administrators responded by restricting access to online records. Footage of Earl was featured on Jimmy Kimmel Live! after the producers decided against flying Earl to Los Angeles.

In a 2005 piece for the Victoria Advocate he is described as being a local icon. Lexington residents have written songs about him, created artwork featuring him, and sold autographed merchandise. Earl was known for his friendly demeanor and love of dancing.

== Later life and death ==
In 2017, following an illness, Earl was admitted to the Owenton Healthcare and Rehabilitation Facility. He remained in their care until his death in May 2024.
