= Laura Johnson Dandridge =

American chef and restaurateur (c. 1852–1918)

Laura Johnson Dandridge (1852–1918), also known as Dolly Johnson, was a 19th-century African American female head chef at the White House, the executive mansion of the U.S. government. She worked in the White House during the Benjamin Harrison administration and then again, after taking some time off for her daughter's health issues, during the Grover Cleveland administration. After she left federal service, she returned to her hometown of Lexington, Kentucky, and opened "several dining rooms and cafés in the early 1900s, including one establishment aptly named the White House Café."
