= List of people from Kentucky =

State flag of Kentucky

Location of Kentucky in the United States

The following list contains persons of note who were born, raised, or spent portions of their lives in the American state of Kentucky.

== Authors and journalists ==
Name	Notable for	Connection to Kentucky
James Lane Allen (1849–1925)	Author, called the state's first important novelist	Born near Lexington
Harriette Simpson Arnow (1908–1986)	Writer of novels, memoirs, and regional histories	Born in Wayne County, raised in Pulaski County
Wendell Berry (born 1934)	Author and poet	Born in New Castle
Myram Borders (born 1936)	20-year manager of Las Vegas United Press International bureau	Born in Kentucky
Pamela Brown (born 1983)	CNN reporter and newscaster	Born in Louisville
Harry M. Caudill (1922–1990)	Author, historian, and attorney	Born in Whitesburg
Irvin S. Cobb (1876–1944)	Author, humorist	Born in Paducah
Clive Cussler (1931–2020)	Author and oceanic explorer	Lived in Louisville
Rachael Denhollander (born 1984)	Author, advocate, lawyer	Lives in Louisville
Greg Downs (born 1971)	Author	Raised in Elizabethtown
John Fetterman (1920–1975)	Pulitzer Prize-winning journalist for Louisville Courier-Journal	Born in Danville
Larry Flynt (1942–2021)	Hustler magazine publisher	Born in Lakeville (Magoffin County)
Joey Goebel (born 1980)	Author	Born in Henderson
bell hooks (Gloria Jean Watkins) (1952–2021)	Author, feminist, and social activist	Born and raised in Hopkinsville
Silas House (born 1971)	Author	Born in Corbin, raised in Lily (Laurel County)
Lewis Craig Humphrey (1875–1927)	Editor of the Louisville Evening Post and co-editor of the Louisville Herald-Post	Born and reared in Louisville
Robert Kirkman (born 1978)	Comic book writer, co-creator of The Walking Dead	Raised in Cynthiana
Bobbie Ann Mason (born 1940)	Author	Born in Mayfield
Robert K. Massie (1929)	Pulitzer Prize-winning author	Born in Lexington
Ed McClanahan (1932–2021)	Novelist, essayist, professor	Born in Brooksville; lives in Lexington
Tony Moore (born 1978)	Comic book illustrator, co-creator of The Walking Dead	Born and raised in Cynthiana
Gurney Norman (born 1937)	Novelist, documentarian, professor	Raised in Allais; worked for Hazard Herald; professor at University of Kentucky
Marsha Norman (born 1947)	Author and lyricist	Born in Louisville
Andrew J. Offutt (1934–2013)	Author	Born near Taylorsville, lived in Haldeman
Chris Offutt (born 1958)	Author	Raised in Haldeman (Rowan County)
Bill Plaschke (born 1958)	Columnist for Los Angeles Times; TV personality	Born in Louisville, attended Ballard High School
Steve Raible (born 1954)	News anchor, sports announcer, former NFL player	Born in Louisville, attended Trinity High School
Elizabeth Madox Roberts (1881–1941)	Poet and novelist	Born in Perryville, spent most of her life in Springfield
Charles P. Roland (1918–2022)	Historian	Spent academic career partly at University of Kentucky, retired to Lexington
Adelaide Day Rollston (1854–1941)	Poet, periodical literature contributor, wrote novelettes	Born and died in Paducah
Jesse Stuart (1907–1984)	Novelist, poet, short-story writer	Born in Greenup County, poet laureate of Kentucky 1954
Allen Tate (1899–1979)	Poet, novelist, literary critic	Born in Winchester
Helen Thomas (1920–2013)	News service reporter in White House press corps	Born in Winchester
Hunter S. Thompson (1937–2005)	Journalist and author	Born in Louisville
Robert Penn Warren (1905–1989)	First poet laureate of the United States	Born in Guthrie
Anne Elizabeth Wilson (1901–1946)	Kentucky-born Canadian poet, writer, editor	Born in Frankfort

== Explorers, pioneers, and military personnel ==
Name	Notable for	Connection to Kentucky
Roy Bean (1825–1903)	Eccentric Old West justice of the peace	Born in Mason County
Stephen Bishop (1780–1857)	Cave explorer and guide, enslaved person	Published the first map of Mammoth Cave
Daniel Boone (1734–1820)	Iconic explorer and trapper, first entered Kentucky on hunting expeditions in 1767, carved Wilderness Trail from Eastern Tennessee through Cumberland Gap into Central Kentucky to Kentucky River; established his fort, Boonesborough, in Madison County where he lived from 1775 to 1779; fought during Revolutionary War, primarily against pro-British Indian tribes in region	
Jim Bowie (1796–1836)	Died at the Battle of the Alamo, made famous the Bowie knife	Born in Logan County
Creed Burlingame (1905–1985)	U.S. Navy submarine commander in the Pacific Theater during World War II	Born in Louisville
Kit Carson (1809–1868)	Indian agent, trapper scout	Born in Madison County
Floyd Collins (1887–1925)	Cave explorer	Trapped and killed in Sand Cave
William J. Crowe Jr. (1925–2007)	U.S. Navy admiral and chairman Joint Chiefs of Staff	Born in La Grange
William R. Higgins (1945–1990)	U.S. Marine colonel who was captured in 1988 and eventually murdered	Born in Danville
Joseph Holt (1807–1894)	United States Postmaster General and judge advocate general	Born in Breckinridge County
Husband E. Kimmel (1882–1968)	Commander of the U.S. Pacific Fleet during the attack on Pearl Harbor	Born in Henderson
Hal Moore (1922–2017)	US Army lieutenant general and author	Born in Bardstown
Franklin Sousley (1925–1945)	One of six in iconic photograph Raising the Flag on Iwo Jima	Born in Hilltop, Fleming County

== Film, radio, and television personalities ==
Name	Notable for	Connection to Kentucky
Ned Beatty (1937–2021)	Actor	Born in Louisville
James E. Cornette (Born 1961)	Star Wrestling Manager, Author and Podcast Host	Born in Louisville
James Best (1926–2015)	Actor	Born in Powderly
Rodger Bingham (born 1947), nicknamed "Kentucky Joe"	Fifth runner-up on Survivor: The Australian Outback	Lives in Crittenden
Olive Blakeney (1899–1959)	Actress	Born in Newport
Foster Brooks (1912–2001)	Comedian	Born in Louisville
W. Earl Brown (born 1963)	Actor	Born in Murray
Tod Browning (1880–1962)	Actor and director	Born in Louisville
Leo Burmester (1944–2007)	Actor	Born in Louisville
Jennifer Carpenter (born 1979)	Actress	Born in Louisville
John Carpenter (born 1948)	Film director	Reared in Bowling Green and attended Western Kentucky University
Will Chase (born 1970)	Actor	Born in Frankfort
George Clooney (born 1961)	Oscar-winning actor and director	Born in Lexington, reared in Augusta
Nick Clooney (born 1934)	Television personality and journalist	Born in Maysville
Rosemary Clooney (1928–2002)	Actress and singer	Born and reared in Maysville
Joyce Compton (1907–1997)	Actress	Born in Lexington
William Conrad (1920–1994)	Actor, director, narrator in radio, film, TV	Born and reared in Louisville
Tom Cruise (born 1962)	Actor and producer	Raised in Louisville
Kassie DePaiva (born 1961)	Actress best known for role on One Life to Live	Born and reared in Morganfield
Johnny Depp (born 1963)	Actor, producer, musician, singer, three-time oscar nominee, painter	Born in Owensboro
Irene Dunne (1898–1990)	Actress, five-time Oscar nominee	Born in Louisville
Bob Edwards (born 1947)	NPR radio host	Born in Louisville
Farah Fath (born 1984)	Actress known for her roles on Days of Our Lives and One Life to Live	Born in Lexington
Don Galloway (1937–2009)	Actor	Born and reared in Brooksville
Rebecca Gayheart (born 1971)	Actress	Born in Hazard
Billy Gilbert (1894–1971)	Actor and comedian	Born in Louisville
D. W. Griffith (1875–1948)	Filmmaker	Born in La Grange
Chris Hardwick (born 1971)	Host, comedian, and actor	Born in Louisville
Florence Henderson (1934–2016)	Actress best known for her role on The Brady Bunch	Reared in Owensboro
Boyd Holbrook (born c. 1981)	Actor	Born in Prestonsburg
Josh Hopkins (born 1970)	Actor	Born in Lexington
Elizabeth Ann Hulette, aka "Miss Elizabeth" (1960–2003)	Professional wrestling manager and valet	Born in Louisville, reared in Frankfort
Josh Hutcherson (born 1992)	Actor	Born in Union
Ashley Judd (born 1968)	Actress	reared in Ashland
Patricia Kalember (born 1956)	Actress	Partly reared in Louisville
Robert Karnes (1917–1979)	Actor	Born in Paducah
Tommy Kirk (born 1941)	Actor	Born in Louisville
Jennifer Lawrence (born 1990)	Oscar-winning actress	Born and reared in Louisville
Maggie Lawson (born 1980)	Actress	Born in Louisville
Matt Long (born 1980)	Actor	Born in Winchester
Lee Majors (born 1939)	Actor	reared in Middlesboro
Terrence Mann (born 1951)	Actor	Born in Ashland
William Mapother (born 1965)	Actor	Born in Louisville
Victor Mature (1915–1999)	Actor	Born in Louisville
Melissa McBride (born 1965)	Actress and casting director	Born in Lexington
Catherine McCord (born 1974)	Actress and model	Born in Louisville
Marie McDonald (1923–1965)	Actress and singer	Born in Burgin
Charles Middleton (1874–1949)	Actor	Born in Elizabethtown
Charles Napier (1936–2011)	Actor	Born in Scottsville
Patricia Neal (1926–2010)	Oscar-winning actress	Born in Packard (Whitley County)
Grady Nutt (1937–1981)	Religious humorist; television personality (Hee Haw)	Lived in Louisville from 1960 until his death including the entire time of his rise to fame
Warren Oates (1928–1982)	Actor	Born in Depoy (Muhlenberg County)
Sean O'Bryan (born 1963)	Actor	Born in Louisville
Annie Potts (born 1952)	Actress	Reared in Franklin
Lawrence Pressman (born 1939)	Actor	Born in Cynthiana
Wes Ramsey (born 1977)	Actor	Born in Louisville
Marisha Ray (born 1989)	Voice actress; co-founder and creative director of Critical Role Productions	Born in Mount Washington
Jeffrey Reddick (born 1969)	Screenwriter, actor, and film producer	reared in Jackson
Jessica Rey (born 1982)	Actress	Born in Fort Campbell
Rob Riggle (born 1970)	Actor on The Daily Show, The Office and Saturday Night Live	Born in Louisville
Kelly Rutherford (born 1968)	Actress on Melrose Place and Gossip Girl	Born in Elizabethtown
Jeri Ryan (born 1968)	Actress on Star Trek: Voyager and Star Trek: Picard	Reared in Paducah
Mitchell Ryan (1928–2022)	Actor	Born in Louisville
Diane Sawyer (born 1945)	TV journalist	Born and reared in Glasgow; lived in Louisville
Michael Shannon (born 1974)	Actor	Born in Lexington
William Shatner (born 1931)	Actor	Seasonally resides in Woodford County
Sam Shepard (1943–2017)	Actor and Pulitzer Prize-winning playwright	Lived in Midway
Molly Sims (born 1973)	Actress and model	Born in Murray
J. Smith-Cameron (born 1955)	Actress	Born in Louisville
Hal Sparks (born 1969)	Actor	Reared in Peak's Mill
Harry Dean Stanton (1926–2017)	Actor	Born in West Irvine (Estill County)
Chrishell Stause (born 1981)	Actress known for her role on All My Children and Selling Sunset	Born in Draffenville (Marshall County)
Martha Stewart (1922–2021)	Actress	Born in Bardwell
Madame Sul-Te-Wan (1873–1959)	Actress	Born in Louisville
Gus Van Sant (born 1952)	Film director	Born in Louisville
Jim Varney (1949–2000)	Actor and comedian	Born in Lexington
Jack Warden (1920–2006)	Actor	Reared in Louisville
Muse Watson (born July 20, 1948)	Actor	Attended Berea College; lives in Berea
Chuck Woolery (born 1940)	Game show host	Born in Ashland
Sean Young (born 1959)	Actress	Born in Louisville
Steve Zahn (born 1967)	Actor	Lives in Scott County

== Government and political leaders ==
Name	Notable for	Connection to Kentucky
Alben W. Barkley (1877–1956)	Vice president of the United States	Born in Graves County, lived much of his adult life in Paducah
Andy Beshear (born 1977)	Governor of Kentucky and attorney general of Kentucky	Born in Louisville
Steve Beshear (born 1944)	61st governor of Kentucky; 49th lieutenant governor of Kentucky and attorney general of Kentucky	Born in Dawson Springs
Louis Brandeis (1856–1941)	US Supreme Court justice	Born and reared in Louisville
John C. Breckinridge (1821–1875)	Vice president of the United States	Born just outside Lexington
John Y. Brown Jr. (1933–2022)	Governor of Kentucky	Born in Lexington
A. B. "Happy" Chandler (1898–1991)	Governor of Kentucky and baseball commissioner	Born in Corydon
Cassius Marcellus Clay (1810–1903)	Abolitionist; ambassador to Russia negotiating purchase of Alaska; newspaper editor	Born and lived in Clermont; resident of Madison County; buried in the Richmond Cemetery
Henry Clay (1777–1852)	Statesman	Lived in Lexington
Kelly Craft (née Guilfoil; born 1962)	United States ambassador to the United Nations and United States ambassador to Canada	Born in Lexington; grew up in Glasgow, Kentucky
John J. Crittenden (1787–1863)	US attorney general, senator, and representative; governor of Kentucky	Born in Versailles; lived in Frankfort
Jefferson Davis (1808–1889)	President of the Confederate States	Born in Christian County
Wendell Hampton Ford (1924–2015)	53rd governor of Kentucky, 1971–1974; 45th lieutenant governor 1967–1971; U.S. senator 1974–1999, member of Democratic Party, veteran of Army and Kentucky National Guard, serving 1944–1946 and 1949–1962	Born and reared in Owensboro
Sara Beth Gregory (born 1982)	Member of Kentucky State Senate; former member of state house, first elected at age 28; attorney	Born in Monticello in Wayne County
Julian Carroll (born 1931)	54th Governor of Kentucky; 46th Lieutenant Governor of Kentucky; member of the Kentucky State Senate, member of the Kentucky House of Representatives	Born in Paducah
Randy Fine (born 1974)	U.S. representative and gambling industry executive	
John Marshall Harlan (1833–1911)	US Supreme Court justice	Born in Boyle County
Jimmy Higdon (born 1953)	Current member of the Kentucky State Senate, former member of the Kentucky House of Representatives, businessman	Born in Taylor County; resident of Lebanon in Marion County
Clayborne F. Jackson (1806–1862)	15th governor of Missouri	Born in Fleming County
Gary C. Johnson (1946)	Former member of the Kentucky State Senate (1997–2001)	Born in Jefferson County
Richard M. Johnson (1780–1850)	9th vice president of the United States	Born in Jefferson County
Robert W. Johnson (1814–1879)	C.S. senator from Arkansas	Born in Scott County
Mae Street Kidd (1909–1999)	State legislator	Represented a district in Louisville
Juanita M. Kreps (1921–2010)	Former US Secretary of Commerce	Born in Lynch
Abraham Lincoln (1809–1865)	16th president of the United States	Born in a portion of Hardin County that now lies in LaRue County
Mary Todd Lincoln (1818–1882)	Wife of Abe Lincoln and First Lady 1861–1865; subject of multiple psychiatric case studies	Born and raised in Lexington
Mitch McConnell (born 1942)	U.S. senator from Kentucky since 1985 and Republican leader of the U.S. Senate	Raised in Louisville
Suzanne Miles (born 1970)	Member of Kentucky House of Representatives from District 7	Born and resides in Owensboro
Samuel Freeman Miller (1816–1890)	US Supreme Court justice	Born in Richmond
Doug Moseley (1928–2017)	State senator (1974–1987)	Resident of Campbellsville, Columbia, and Bowling Green
Carrie Nation (1846–1911)	Prohibitionist	Born in Garrard County
Ruth Ann Palumbo (born 1949)	Member of the Kentucky House of Representatives	Born, raised, and resides in Lexington
Scott Pruitt (born 1968)	Attorney general of Oklahoma	Grew up in Lexington
Stanley Forman Reed (1844–1980)	US Supreme Court justice	Born in Minerva
Wiley Blount Rutledge (1894–1949)	US Supreme Court justice	Born in Cloverport
Tony Snow (1955–2008)	White House Press Secretary to President George W. Bush	Born in Berea
James Speed (1812–1887)	US attorney general under Abraham Lincoln	Born in Jefferson County
Adlai E. Stevenson I (1835–1914)	Vice president of the United States	Born in Christian County
Zachary Taylor (1784–1850)	12th president of the United States	Raised in Kentucky
Ken Upchurch (born 1969)	Member of the Kentucky House of Representatives from District 52	Resides in his native Monticello in Wayne County
Fred M. Vinson (1890–1953)	Chief justice of the United States	Born in Louisa
Roger Vinson (born 1940)	Senior federal judge	Born in Cadiz
James E. Whitlock (born 1934)	State representative	Resident of Marion County
David L. Williams (born 1953)	Member of the Kentucky State Senate from 1987 to 2012, president of the state Senate from 2000 to 2012; Republican U.S. Senate nominee in 1992, gubernatorial nominee in 2011; current 40th District circuit judge	Born in Burkesville in Cumberland County
Max Wise (born 1975)	Member of the Kentucky State Senate from District 16 in south central Kentucky, former FBI agent	Born, reared, and resides in Campbellsville
Whitney Young (1921–1971)	Civil rights administrator	Born in Lincoln Ridge
Ron Ziegler (1939–2003)	White House Press Secretary to President Richard Nixon	Born in Covington

== Infamous persons ==
Name	Notable for	Connection to Kentucky
Larry Birkhead (born 1973)	Father of Anna Nicole Smith's daughter, Dannielynn Hope Marshall Birkhead	Born, resides in Louisville
Lynndie England (born 1982)	Convicted in the Abu Ghraib prison abuse scandal	Born in Ashland
Donald Harvey (1952–2017)	Convicted serial killer	Raised in Booneville
Charles Manson (1934–2017)	Convicted criminal and cult leader	Raised in Ashland

== Musicians ==
Name	Notable for	Connection to Kentucky
Tanner Adell (born 1996)	Country singer	Born in Lexington
David "Stringbean" Akeman (1916–1973)	Country and comedy musician, member of the Grand Ole Opry, cast member on Hee Haw	Born in Annville
John J. Becker (1886–1961)	Composer	Born in Henderson
Adrian Belew (born 1949)	Guitarist and vocalist for the band King Crimson	Born in Covington, raised in Alexandria and Ludlow
Kenny Bishop (born 1966)	Gospel and Christian singer	Raised in Richmond
Mark Bishop (born 1965)	Southern gospel singer	Raised in Richmond
Laura Bell Bundy (born 1981)	Country singer and actress	Raised in Lexington
Steven Curtis Chapman (born 1962)	Contemporary Christian musician	Born and raised in Paducah
Tyler Childers (born 1991)	Country singer	Born in Lawrence County
John Conlee (born 1946)	Country singer	Born and raised in Versailles
Billy Ray Cyrus (born 1961)	Country singer and actor	Born in Flatwoods
Skeeter Davis (1931–2004)	Country singer	Born in Dry Ridge
Jackie DeShannon (born 1941)	Singer-songwriter	Born in Hazel
Don Everly (1937–2021)	Member of the Rock and Roll Hall of Fame and the Country Music Hall of Fame	Born near Central City
Phil Everly (1939–2014)	Member of the Rock and Roll Hall of Fame and the Country Music Hall of Fame	Born near Central City
Red Foley (1910–1968)	Singer in Country Music Hall of Fame	Born in Blue Lick
Crystal Gayle (born 1951)	Country singer	Born in Paintsville
EST Gee (born 1994)	Rapper	Born and raised in Louisville
Troy Lee Gentry (1967–2017)	Country singer	Born in Lexington
Ashley Gorley	Country songwriter and record producer	Born in Danville
Tom T. Hall (born 1936–2021)	Country singer-songwriter	Born in Olive Hill
Lionel Hampton (1908–2002)	Jazz musician	Born in Louisville
Jack Harlow (born 1998)	Rapper	Born and raised in Louisville
Larnelle Harris	Gospel singer	Born in Danville
Telma Hopkins (born 1948)	Singer and actress	Born in Louisville
Grandpa Jones (1913–1998)	"Old time" country and gospel music singer, member of the Country Music Hall of Fame and Grand Ole Opry; cast member on Hee Haw	Born in Niagara
Jonah Jones (1919–2000)	Jazz trumpeter	Born in Louisville
Tinashe Jorgensen Kachingwe (born 1993)	Singer-songwriter, dancer, record producer, actress, and model	Born in Lexington
Naomi Judd (1946–2022)	Country singer	Born and raised in Ashland
Wynonna Judd (born 1964)	Country singer	Born and raised in Ashland
James Kottak (born 1962)	Former drummer for hard rock groups Kingdom Come, Wild Horses and Warrant; current drummer for German heavy metal band The Scorpions	Born in Louisville
Nick Lachey (born 1973)	Member of the band 98 Degrees; married to Jessica Simpson and starred on reality show Newlyweds: Nick and Jessica	Born in Harlan
Homer Ledford (1927–2006)	Bluegrass musician and instrument maker	Lived in Winchester
Brian Littrell (born 1975)	Member of the Backstreet Boys	Born in Lexington
Patty Loveless (born 1957)	Country singer	Born in Pikeville
Loretta Lynn (1932–2022)	Country singer	Born and raised in Butcher Holler
Les McCann (born 1935)	Soul jazz piano player and vocalist; crossover artist into R&B and soul	Born in Lexington
Bill Monroe (1911–1996)	"Father of bluegrass music" and member of the Country Music Hall of Fame	Born and raised in Rosine
Eddie Montgomery (born 1963)	Country singer	Born in Danville, raised in Garrard County
John Michael Montgomery (born 1965)	Country singer	Born in Danville, raised in Garrard County
Will Oldham (born 1970)	Songwriter and musician	Born in Louisville
Joan Osborne (born 1963)	Singer-songwriter	Born in Anchorage
Josh Osborne	Grammy-winning country music songwriter	Virgie
Artimus Pyle (born 1948)	Former drummer for the Southern Rock band Lynyrd Skynyrd	Born in Louisville
Dottie Rambo (1934–2008)	Member of the Gospel Music Hall of Fame	Born in Madisonville, raised in Morganfield
Kevin Richardson (born 1971)	Member of the Backstreet Boys	Born in Lexington, raised in Irvine
Jean Ritchie (1922–2015)	Folk singer	Born in Viper (Perry County)
Rubi Rose (born 1997)	Rapper, model	Born in Lexington
Nicole Scherzinger (born 1978)	Pop singer, former member of The Pussycat Dolls, television personality	Raised in Louisville
Sturgill Simpson (born 1978)	Grammy-winning musician	Born in Jackson, grew up in Versailles
Ricky Skaggs (born 1954)	Bluegrass and country music artist	Born and raised in Cordell (Lawrence County)
Kevin Skinner (born 1974)	Country singer, winner of 2009 America's Got Talent	Native of Mayfield
Jordan Smith (born 1994)	Pop singer, winner of The Voice season 9	Born in Harlan (Harlan County)
Chris Stapleton (born 1978)	Country singer	Born in Lexington
Rick Steier (born 1960)	Former guitarist for hard rock groups Kingdom Come, Wild Horses and Warrant	Born in Louisville
Mark Stuart (born 1968)	Member of the Christian band Audio Adrenaline	Born and raised in Owensboro
Noah Thompson (born 2002)	American Idol season 20 winner	Raised in Blaine (Lawrence County)
Bryson Tiller (born 1993)	Rapper	Born and raised in Louisville
David Tolliver	Singer-songwriter, Halfway to Hazard	Born in Hindman
Mary Travers (1936–2009)	Folk singer with Peter, Paul and Mary	Born in Louisville
Merle Travis (1917–1983)	Member of the Country Music Hall of Fame	Born in Rosewood (Muhlenberg County)
Keith Whitley (1955–1989)	Country singer	Born in Sandy Hook
Dwight Yoakam (born 1956)	Country singer	Born in Pikeville

== Scientists and inventors ==
Name	Notable for	Connection to Kentucky
James Gilbert Baker (1914–2005)	Astronomer, designer of optics systems, co-founder of Louisville Astronomical Society	Born in Louisville, graduated from the University of Louisville
Isaac Chuang	Inventor, realized the first quantum computer	Born in Corbin
George Devol (1912–2011)	Inventor of Unimate, the first industrial robot	Born in Louisville
Rex Geveden	Associate administrator of NASA	Born in Mayfield
J. Richard Gott (born 1947)	Princeton University astrophysical sciences professor and Doomsday argument theory	Born in Louisville
Robert H. Grubbs (1942–2021)	2005 Nobel laureate in Chemistry	Born in Marshall County, raised in Paducah
G. Scott Hubbard (born 1948)	NASA scientist, associate director of NASA's Ames Research Center, "Mars czar"	Born and raised in Elizabethtown
William Lipscomb (1919–2011)	1976 Nobel laureate in Chemistry	Raised in Lexington
Garrett A. Morgan (1877–1963)	Traffic light and gas mask inventor	Born in Paris
Thomas Hunt Morgan (1866–1945)	1933 Nobel laureate in Physiology or Medicine	Born in Lexington
Phillip A. Sharp (born 1944)	1993 Nobel laureate in Physiology or Medicine	Born in Falmouth
Nathan Stubblefield (1860–1928)	Inventor, demonstrated wireless radio	Born in Murray
John T. Thompson (1860–1940)	Inventor of the "Tommy" gun	Born in Newport
George Whitesides (1939–2026)	Harvard University chemistry professor	Born in Louisville
Terrence W. Wilcutt (born 1949)	Astronaut	Born in Russellville

== Sports figures ==
Name	Notable for	Connection to Kentucky
Nate Adcock (born 1988)	MLB relief pitcher	Born in Elizabethtown
David Akers (born 1974)	NFL placekicker	Born and raised in Lexington
Shaun Alexander (born 1977)	NFL running back	Born and raised in Florence
Muhammad Ali (born Cassius Clay) (1942–2016)	Olympic and professional boxing champion and activist	Born and raised in Louisville
Dave Anderson (born 1960)	MLB infielder and coach	Born in Louisville
Derek Anderson (born 1974)	NBA shooting guard	Born in Louisville
Josh Anderson (born 1982)	MLB center fielder	Born and raised in Somerset
Bill Arnsparger (1926–2015)	New York Giants and LSU head coach	Born in Paris, Kentucky
Len Barker (born 1955)	MLB pitcher	Born in Fort Knox
Jeremy Bates (born 1974)	Boxer nicknamed "The Beast"	Born in Argillite
Butch Beard (born 1947)	NBA player and coach	Born and raised in Hardinsburg
Gus Bell (1928–1995)	MLB player	Born in Louisville
Todd Benzinger (born 1964)	MLB player	Born in Dayton
Bernie Bickerstaff (born 1944)	Head coach of five NBA teams	Born in Benham
Rob Bironas (1978–2014)	NFL placekicker	Born and raised in Louisville
Gay Brewer (1932–2007)	Pro golfer, 1967 Masters champion	Raised in Lexington
Don Brumfield (born 1938)	Hall of Fame jockey	Born in Nicholasville
Greg Buckner (born 1976)	NBA shooting guard and coach	Born in Hopkinsville
Jay Buhner (born 1964)	MLB outfielder	Born in Louisville
Jim Bunning (1931–2017)	Baseball Hall of Fame pitcher and politician	Born in Southgate
Chris Burke (born 1980)	MLB second baseman	Born in Louisville
Paul Byrd (born 1970)	MLB pitcher	Born in Louisville
Dwane Casey (born 1957)	Head coach of NBA's Toronto Raptors	Born in Morganfield
Steve Cauthen (born 1960)	National Horse Racing Hall of Fame jockey	Born in Covington, raised in Walton
Ray Chapman (1891–1920)	Only Major League Baseball player to be killed during a game	Born in Beaver Dam
Rex Chapman (born 1967)	NBA shooting guard	Born in Bowling Green, attended Owensboro's Apollo High School
Jerry Claiborne (1928–2000)	College Football Hall of Fame coach	Born in Hopkinsville
Tyler Clippard (born 1985)	MLB pitcher	Born in Lexington
Blanton Collier (1906–1983)	Cleveland Browns and Kentucky head coach	Born in Millersburg
Cris Collinsworth (born 1959)	Wide receiver for Cincinnati Bengals, TV sportscaster	Resides in Fort Thomas
Earle Combs (1889–1976)	Baseball Hall of Famer	Born in Pebworth (Owsley County)
Tim Couch (born 1977)	NFL quarterback	Born and raised in Hyden
Dave Cowens (born 1948)	Basketball Hall of Famer	Born and raised in Newport
Denny Crum (1937–2023)	Basketball Hall of Fame coach	Lived in Louisville
Dermontti Dawson (born 1965)	NFL center	Born in Lexington
Paul Derringer (1906–1987)	MLB pitcher	Born in Springfield
E. A. Diddle (1895–1972)	Basketball Hall of Fame coach	Born in Gradyville (Adair County)
Chris Dowe (born 1991)	Professional basketball player in the Israeli Basketball Premier League	Born in Louisville
Scott Downs (born 1976)	MLB relief pitcher	Born in Louisville
Brian Doyle (born 1954)	MLB infielder	Born in Glasgow
Denny Doyle (1944–2022)	MLB infielder	Born in Glasgow
Laura duPont (1949–2002)	Tennis player	Born in Louisville
Hugh Durham (born 1937)	College Hall of Fame basketball coach	Born in Louisville
Steve Finley (born 1965)	MLB outfielder	Raised in Paducah
Hugh Durham (born 1937)	College Hall of Fame basketball coach	Born in Louisville
Bud Foster (born 1959)	Virginia Tech defensive coordinator 1995–2019	Born in Somerset
Woodie Fryman (1940–2011)	MLB infielder	Born and raised in Ewing
Joe Fulks (1921–1976)	Basketball Hall of Famer	Born in Birmingham (Marshall County)
Clarence Gaines (1923–2005)	College Hall of Fame basketball coach	Born in Paducah
Tyson Gay (born 1982)	Sprinter, 2007 world champion at 100 and 200 meters	Born and raised in Lexington
Jack Givens (born 1956)	Basketball player, 1978 Final Four MVP	Born in Lexington
Sean Green (born 1979)	MLB relief pitcher	Born in Louisville
Ted Greene (1932–1982)	AFL linebacker	Born in Kentucky
Darrell Griffith (born 1958)	College Hall of Fame basketball player	Born in Louisville
Don Gullett (born 1951)	MLB pitcher	Born in Lynn, attended high school in South Shore
Eddie Haas (born 1935)	MLB player	Born in Paducah
Cliff Hagan (1931–2026)	Hall of Fame basketball player	Born in Owensboro
Joe B. Hall (1928–2022)	College Hall of Fame basketball coach	Born in Cynthiana
Clem Haskins (born 1943)	NBA player and coach	Born in Campbellsville
Nicky Hayden (1981–2017)	MotoGP racer	Born and raised in Owensboro
JB Holmes (born 1982)	PGA Tour golfer	Born and raised in Campbellsville
Paul Hornung (1935–2020)	Notre Dame and Pro Football Hall of Famer, sportscaster	Born and raised in Louisville
Allan Houston (born 1971)	NBA shooting guard	Born and raised in Louisville
Lou Johnson (1932–2020)	MLB outfielder	Born in Lexington
Monique Jones (born 1979)	IFBB professional bodybuilder	Born in Fort Knox
Gregory Kaidanov (born 1959)	U.S. chess grandmaster	Lives in Lexington
Austin Kearns (born 1980)	MLB outfielder	Born in Lexington
Shawn Kelley (born 1984)	MLB relief pitcher	Born in Louisville
Shipwreck Kelly (1910–1986)	NFL halfback	Born in Simstown
Roy Kidd (born 1931)	College Football Hall of Fame coach	Born in Corbin
Stephen Mather (1970–2005)	Pro tennis player	Born and raised in Louisville
Jeremy Mayfield (born 1969)	NASCAR driver	Born and raised in Owensboro
Carl Mays (1891–1971)	MLB pitcher	Born in Liberty
George McAfee (1918–2009)	Pro Football Hall of Fame halfback for Chicago Bears	Born in Corbin
Mary T. Meagher (born 1964)	1984, 1988 Olympic medalist swimmer	Born in Louisville
Trever Miller (born 1973)	MLB pitcher	Born in Louisville
C. J. Mosley (born 1983)	NFL defensive end	Born in Fort Knox
Tori Murden (born 1963)	First woman to make solo crossing of Atlantic Ocean by rowboat or ski to geographic South Pole	Raised and lives in Louisville
Bobby Nichols (born 1936)	Pro golfer, 1964 PGA Championship winner	Born in Louisville
Betty Pariso (born 1956)	IFBB professional bodybuilder	Born in Cynthiana
John Pelphrey (born 1968)	University of Kentucky basketball player and Florida assistant coach	Born in Paintsville
Kenny Perry (born 1960)	Professional golfer	Born in Elizabethtown, raised in Franklin, graduated from high school in Lone Oak
Mel Purcell (born 1959)	Pro tennis player	Raised in Murray
Frank Ramsey (1931–2018)	Basketball Hall of Famer	Born in Corydon
Jon Rauch (born 1978)	Professional baseball pitcher	Born in Louisville and raised in Westport
Pee Wee Reese (1918–1999)	Baseball Hall of Famer	Born in Ekron and raised in Louisville
Mark Reynolds (born 1983)	MLB infielder	Born in Pikeville
Weston Richburg (born 1991)	Professional football player	Born in Louisville
Rajon Rondo (born 1986)	Professional basketball player	Born in Louisville
Gene Roof (born 1958)	MLB player	Born in Paducah
Phil Roof (born 1941)	MLB player	Born in Paducah
Jack Roush (born 1942)	International Motorsports Hall of Famer	Born in Covington
Vincent Sanford (born 1990)	Professional basketball player in the Israeli Basketball Premier League	Born in Lexington
Howard Schnellenberger (1934–2021)	College football coach, Miami, Louisville and Florida Atlantic	Raised in Louisville
Ferdie Schupp (1891–1971)	Professional baseball pitcher, New York Giants, St. Louis Cardinals, Brooklyn Robins, and Chicago White Sox	Raised in Louisville
Frank Selvy (born 1932)	College Hall of Fame basketball player	Born in Corbin
John Shelby (born 1958)	MLB outfielder	Born in Lexington
Jeff Sheppard (born 1974)	Basketball player for Kentucky Wildcats	resides in London (Laurel County)
Phil Simms (born 1955)	NFL quarterback and TV sportscaster	Born in Lebanon, raised in Louisville
Donta Smith (born 1983)	Professional basketball player in NBA and for Maccabi Haifa, 2014 Israeli Basketball Premier League MVP	Born in Louisville
C. J. Spillman (born 1986)	NFL safety and special teamer	Born in Louisville
Woody Stephens (1913–1998)	Hall of Fame thoroughbred trainer	Born in Stanton
Danny Sullivan (born 1950)	C.A.R.T. and Formula 1 auto racer; winner of 1985 Indianapolis 500	Born in Louisville
Jacob Tamme (born 1985)	NFL tight end	Born in Lexington
Justin Thomas (born 1993)	Pro golfer, 2017 PGA Championship champion	Born in Louisville
Dan Uggla (born 1980)	MLB second baseman	Born in Louisville
Wes Unseld (1946–2020)	Basketball Hall of Famer	Born and raised in Louisville
Darrell Waltrip (born 1947)	NASCAR driver and broadcaster	Born and raised in Owensboro
Michael Waltrip (born 1963)	NASCAR driver	Born and raised in Owensboro
Jeff Walz (born 1971)	Louisville women's basketball coach	Born and raised in Fort Thomas
Larry Warford (born 1991)	NFL offensive lineman	Raised in Richmond
Brandon Webb (born 1979)	MLB pitcher, 2006 National League Cy Young Award winner	Born and raised in Ashland
Todd Wellemeyer (born 1978)	MLB pitcher	Born in Louisville
John Wooden (born 1910)	Basketball player and coach	Taught English and coached several sports at Dayton High School

== Visual artists ==
Name	Notable for	Connection to Kentucky
Ann Stewart Anderson (1935–2019)	Painter, artist	Born in Frankfort, but spent most of her life in Louisville
John James Audubon (1785–1851)	Wildlife artist	Spent much of his career painting in Henderson
Lance Burton (born 1960)	Stage magician	Born in Louisville
Frank Duveneck (1848–1919)	Figure and portrait painter	Born in Covington
Larry Elmore (born 1948)	Fantasy artist	Born in Louisville
Fontaine Fox (1884–1964)	Cartoonist	Born in Louisville
Joel Tanner Hart (1810–1877)	Sculptor	Born near Winchester, in Clark County
Harlan Hubbard (1900–1988)	Artist and author	Born in Bellevue and lived in Fort Thomas and Trimble County
Mac King (born 1959)	Stage magician	Born in Hopkinsville
Loren Long	Illustrator	Raised in Lexington
David W. Mack (born 1972)	Comic book artist and writer	Lives in Bromley, graduate of Northern Kentucky University
Amanda Matthews (born 1968)	Artist of The Girl Puzzle (NYC), artist of United We Stand, Divided We Fall (COVID Memorial KY), public speaker	Born in Mt. Washington; lives in Lexington
Kate Matthews (1870–1956)	Photographer	Born in New Albany, Indiana, but spent most of her life in Pewee Valley
Ralph Eugene Meatyard (1925–1972)	Photographer	Born in Normal, Illinois, but established his photography and optometry careers in Lexington
Don Rosa (born 1951)	Cartoonist, Donald Duck illustrator	Born in Louisville
Paul Sawyier (1865–1917)	Painter, artist	Raised in Frankfort and spent most of his painting career there
Gideon Shryock (1802–1880)	Architect	Born in Lexington
Moneta Sleet Jr. (1926–1996)	1969 Pulitzer Prize for Feature Photography	Born in Owensboro
Bruce Tinsley (born 1958)	Cartoonist, known for his comic strip Mallard Fillmore	Born in Louisville
Edgar Tolson (1904–1984)	Woodcarver and folk artist	Born in Trent Fork

== Other notable persons ==
Name	Notable for	Connection to Kentucky
David Boaz (1953–2024)	Libertarian author, philosopher and editor	Born in Mayfield
Ben M. Bogard (1868–1941) Executive vice president of the Cato Institute	Clergyman, founder of American Baptist Association; pastor of Antioch Missionary Baptist Church of Little Rock, Arkansas, pastor under Southern Baptist Convention in 1890s Kentucky	Born in Elizabethtown
Anne Braden (1924–2006)	Civil rights activist, journalist, educator	Born in Louisville
LaVerne Butler (1926–2010)	Clergyman and college president	Born in Henderson County; pastor of 9th & O Baptist Church in Louisville, president of Mid-Continent University in Mayfield, also resided in Lexington
Brian Cashman (born 1967)	Senior VP and general manager of New York Yankees	Raised in Lexington
Edgar Cayce (1877–1945)	Mystic	Born in Beverly, seven miles (11 km) south of Hopkinsville
Thomas D. Clark (1903–2005)	Historian credited with preserving much of Kentucky's history	Lived in Lexington, taught at University of Kentucky for more than seven decades
Chris Clarke (born 1957)	Southern Baptist missionary to the equestrian community	Operates Happy Trails Ministry in Burna
David and Mary Conley	The Amazing Race contestants known as "Team Kentucky"	Live in Stone
Tara Conner (born 1985)	2006 Miss USA	Raised from early childhood in Russell Springs
Mordecai Ham (1877–1961)	Tent revivalist who preached the sermon, converting Billy Graham to Christianity	Born in Allen County
Heather French Henry (born 1974)	2000 Miss America	Born in Augusta, raised in Maysville
Duncan Hines (1880–1959)	Food critic	Born in Bowling Green
Willie K. Hocker (1862–1944)	Designer of the Arkansas state flag	Born in Madison County
Robert S. James (1818–1850)	Revivalist pastor; father of Jesse James and Frank James; co-founder of William Jewell College	Born in Logan County
Casey Jones (1864–1900)	Railroad engineer of song; killed trying to stop a train collision; subject of a television series based loosely on his career	Born in Cayce
Lexi Love	Drag performer on Rupaul's Drag Race Season 17	Based in Louville, and from Florence
Brandi Mudd (born 1989)	Elementary school teacher and contestant from MasterChef season 7	Born in Irvington
Venus Ramey (1924–2017)	1944 Miss America	Born in Ashland, raised in Paintsville
Gene Robinson (born 1947)	First openly gay noncelibate Episcopal bishop	Born in Lexington
Col. Harland Sanders (1890–1980)	Founder of KFC	Lived in Corbin
"Papa" John Schnatter (born 1962)	Founder of Papa John's Pizza	Lives in Anchorage

== See also ==
- List of Kentucky suffragists
- List of Kentucky women in the civil rights era
- List of people from Lexington, Kentucky
- List of people from the Louisville metropolitan area
