= Amanda Matthews =

American sculptor and painter

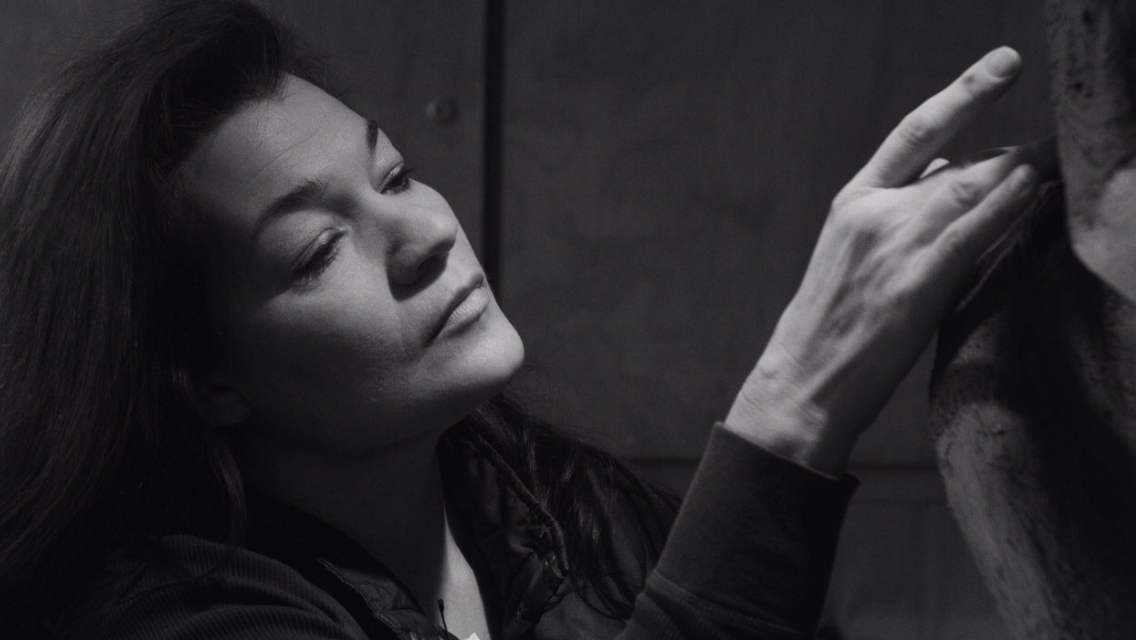
- Amanda Matthews in studio
- Born: September 1, 1968 (age 58); Louisville, Kentucky
- Education: University of Louisville
- Occupations: Sculptor, painter, CEO of Prometheus Foundry
- Spouse: Robert (Brad) Connell
- Children: 2

Amanda Matthews (born 1968) is an American sculptor and painter from Mt. Washington, Kentucky, United States, who lives in Lexington, Kentucky.

== Early life, education and family ==
Amanda Matthews was born in 1968 in Louisville, Kentucky to James (Jim) Matthews III and Brenda Matthews. She attended Bullitt East High School in Mt. Washington, Kentucky and graduated in 1986. Matthews earned her Bachelor of Arts in Studio Art with a minor in Philosophy from the University of Louisville in Louisville, Kentucky in 1990. She studied abroad in Paris, France in 1989 with the University of Louisville, studying Fine Art and Architecture while abroad.

== Career ==
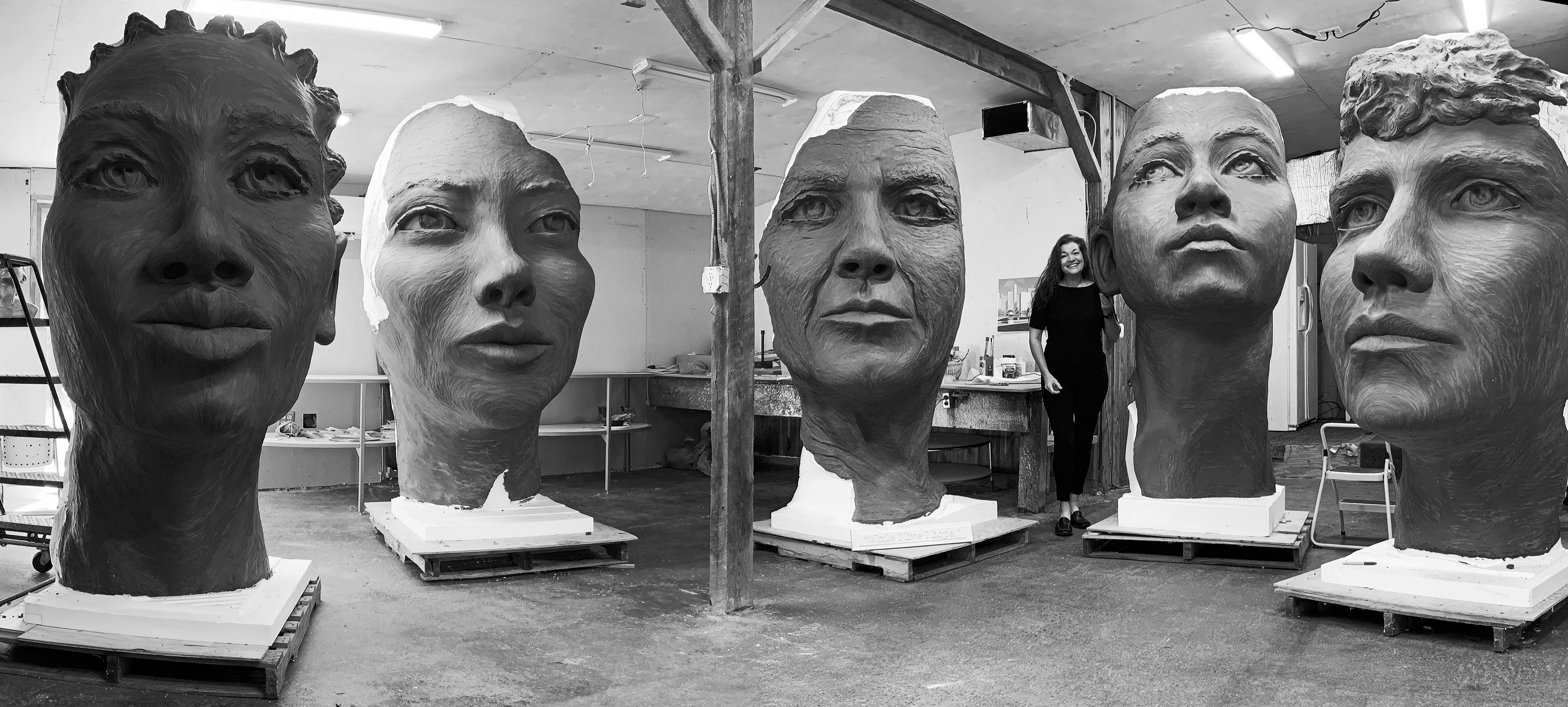
Amanda standing next to the clay faces in her studio for The Girl Puzzle Monument in New York City honoring Nellie Bly

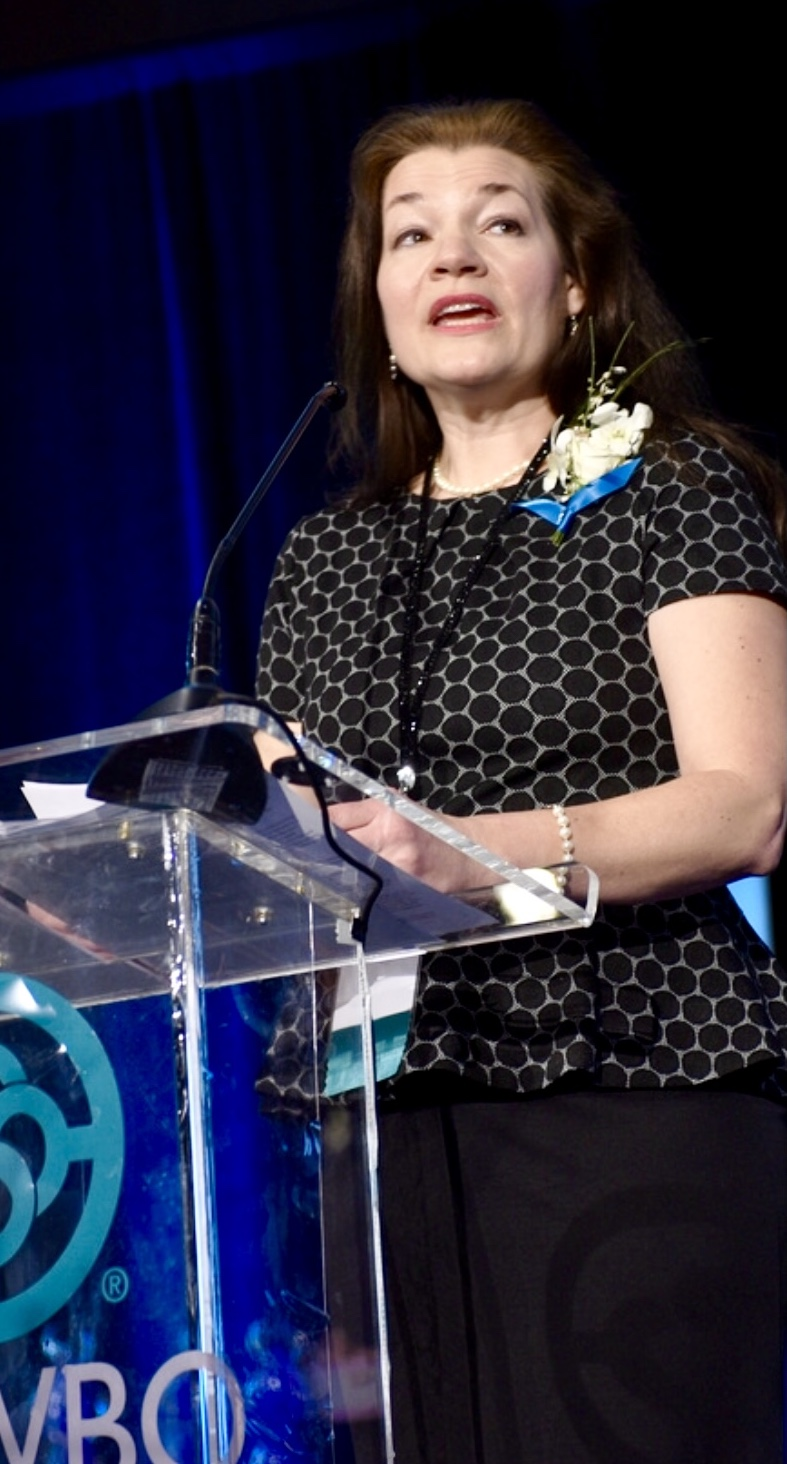
Matthews accepting NAWBO Strive Business Owner of the Year Award, 2018

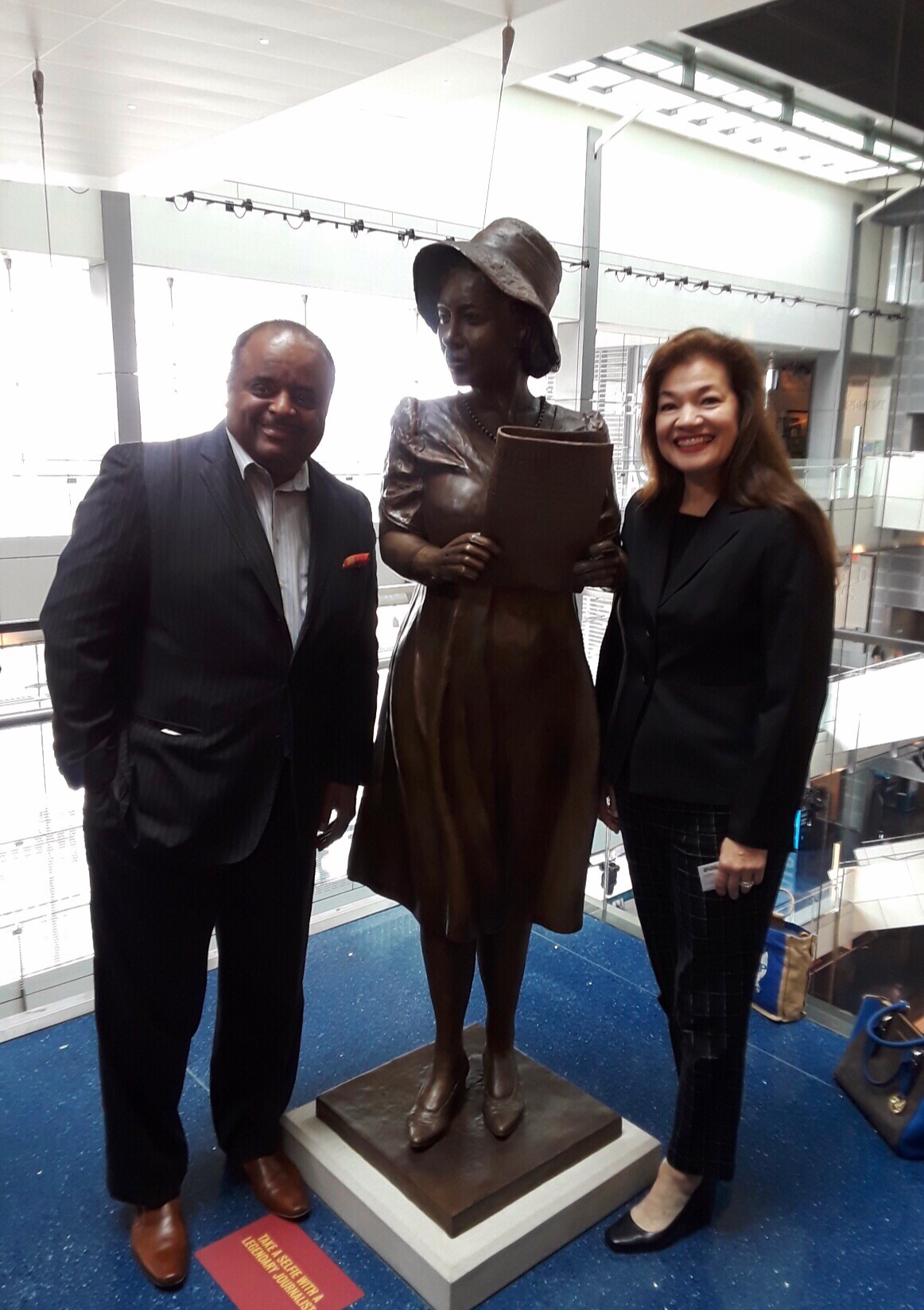
Amanda Matthews with Roland Martin at Newseum, Washington, DC for unveiling of Alice Allison Dunnigan statue

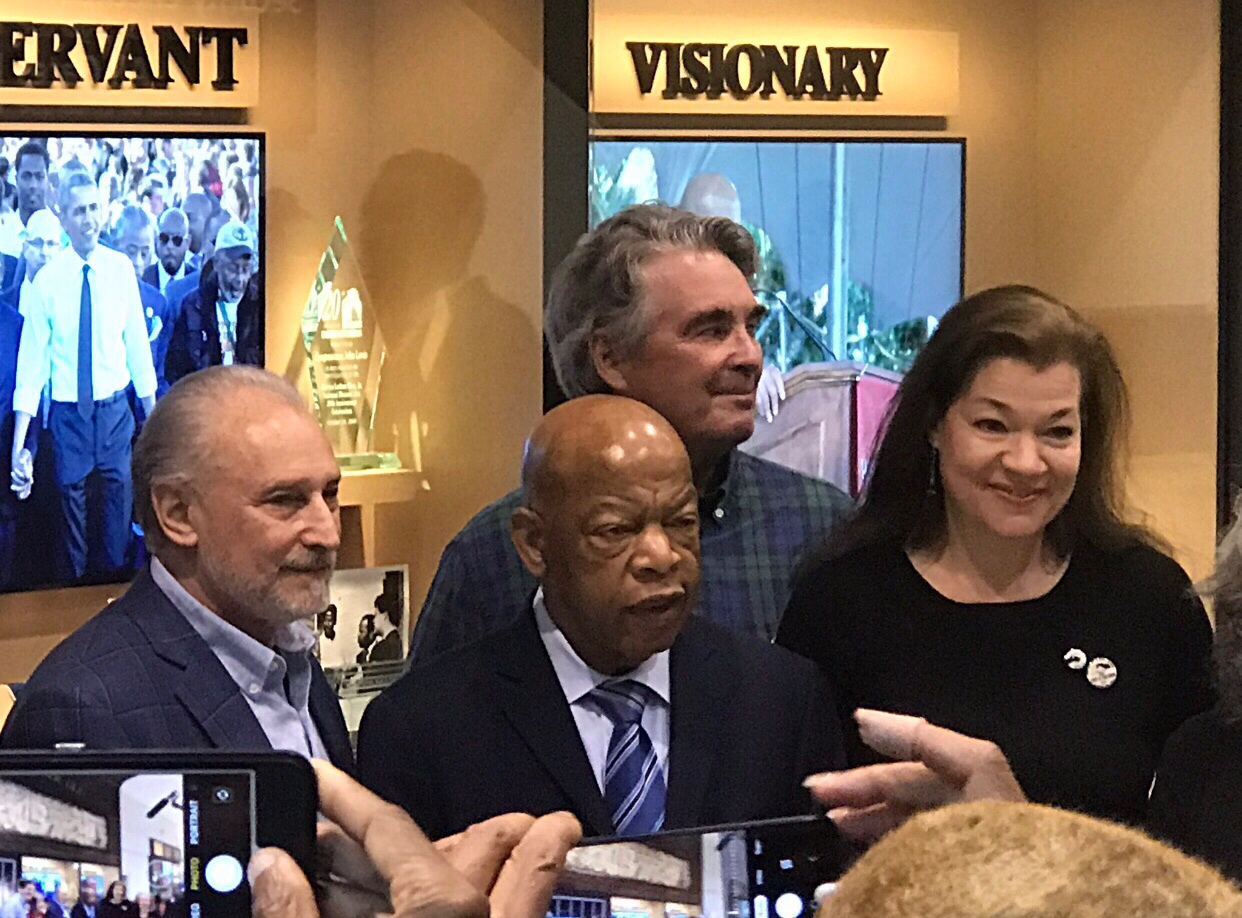
Amanda Matthews with Congressman John Lewis at Hartsfield-Jackson Atlanta International Airport for unveiling of “John Lewis – Good Trouble”

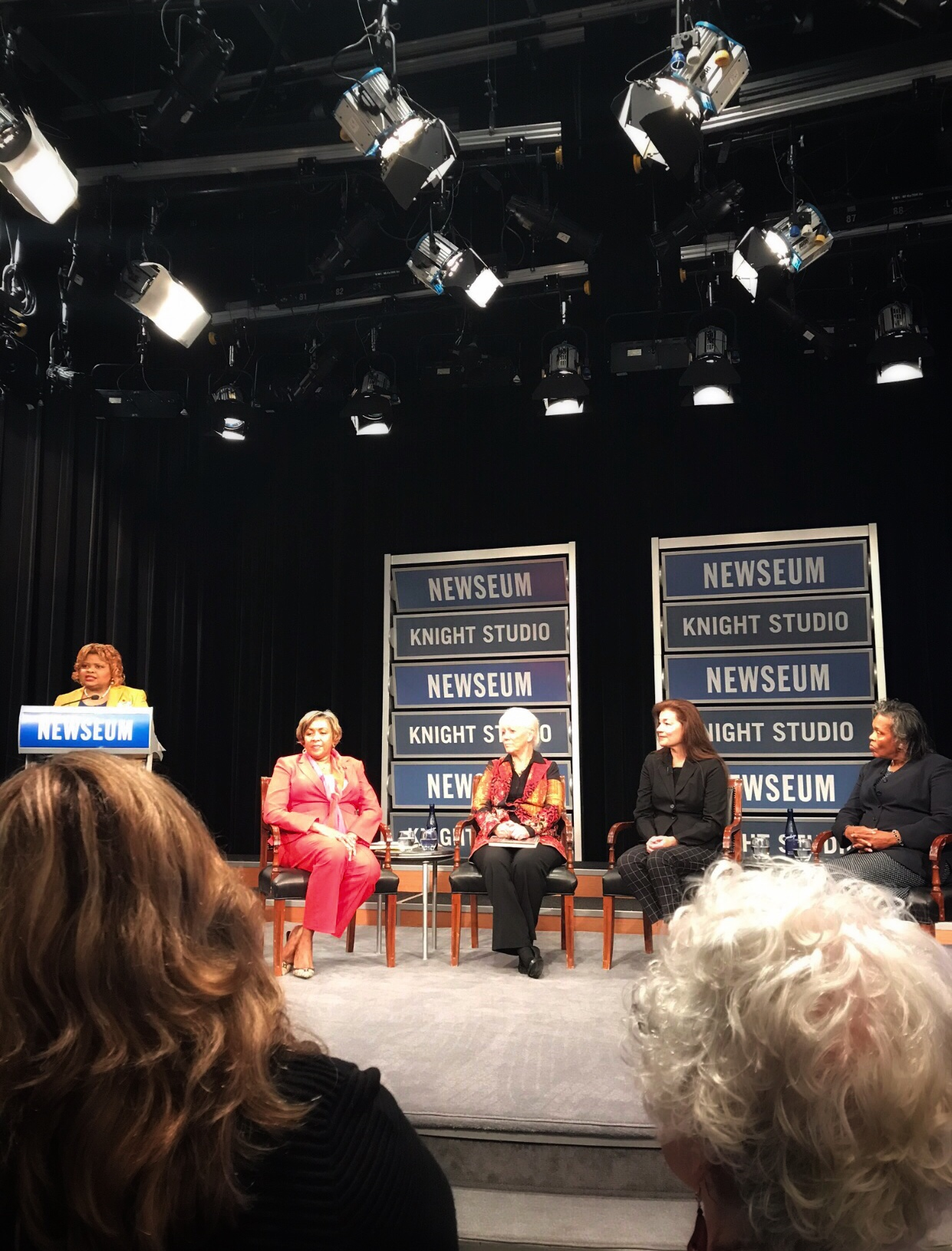
Amanda Matthews on panel with Sonya Ross and Carol McCabe Booker at Newseum, Washington DC for unveiling of Alice Allison Dunnigan statue

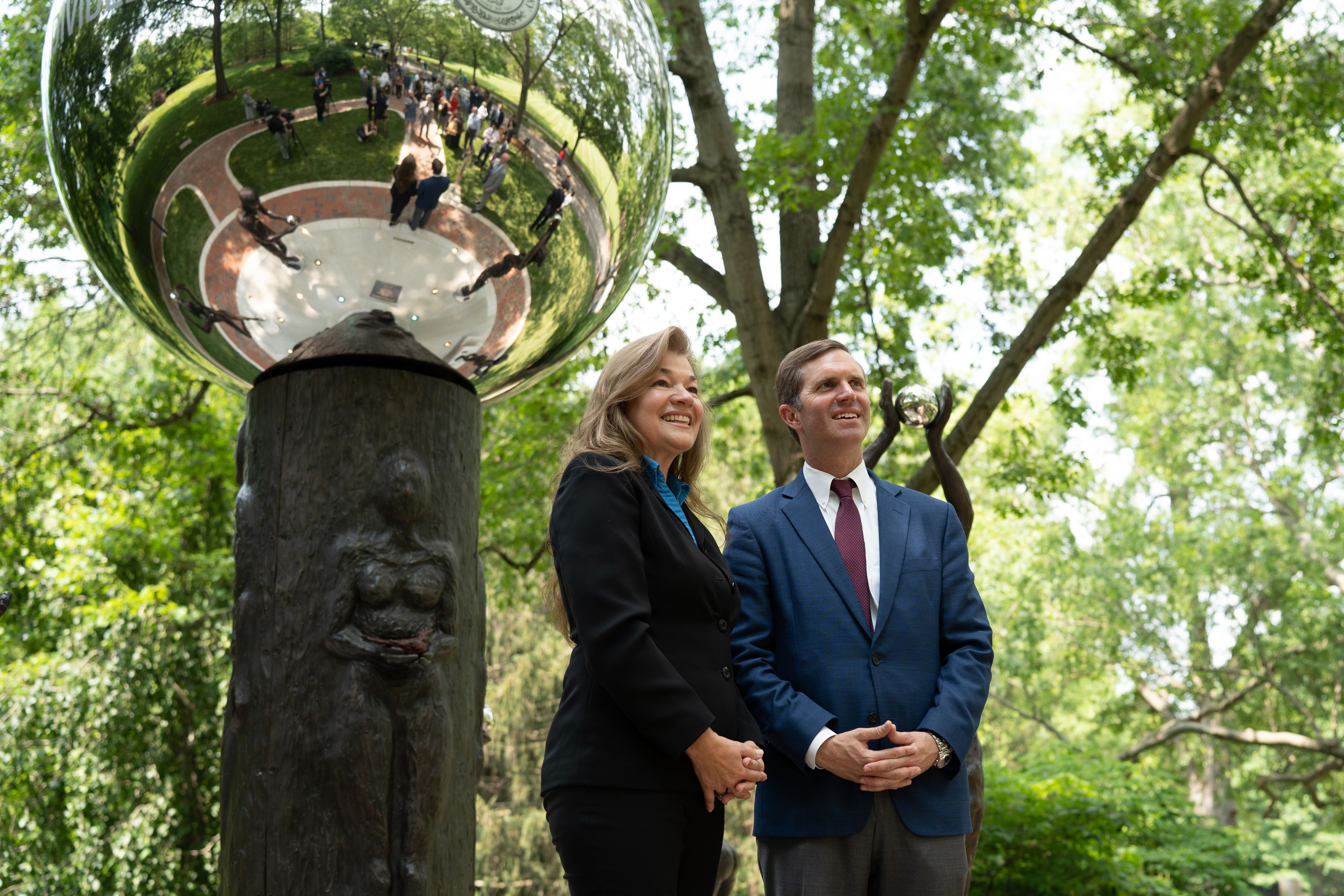
Governor Beshear: Thank you to Kentucky native Amanda Matthews for designing and sculpting “United We Stand. Divided We Fall.” This meaningful monument will honor those lost, while also ensuring Kentuckians know the strength of our people when we come together to overcome challenges.

Matthews is known for her award-winning work that honors women and celebrates diversity and inclusion. She began her career as a painter and faculty member for the Louisville Visual Arts Association. She founded Wild Honeysuckle Studio in 1998, which merged with Prometheus Bronze Foundry, LLC in 2009.

Matthews received her first grant as part of the Sister Cities International program and travelled to Mainz, Germany in 2006 to represent the City of Louisville, Kentucky and the United States during the tenure of Mayor Jerry Abramson. She participated in the Kunst in der Stadt, Kuenstlerarbeiten Public Exhibition at Gutenbergplatz, Mainz, Germany. Fourteen artists, two artists each from seven countries, were selected to participate. Her work while in Mainz was a permanent gift to the City of Mainz, Germany from the City of Louisville, KY. Later that year, she participated in the Kentuckians for the Commonwealth Appalachian Mountain Witness Tour for Artists and Writers in the fall of 2006, which marked the beginning of her decades-long body of large scale bronze Dryads, titled Messengers. In 2007, on Earth Day, she completed a 210' long Ephemeral Environmental Sculpture Installation, called Water is Life for the Louisville Zoo, an AZA and AAM Museum, with the help of 20 volunteers. Diane Heilenman, Visual Arts Critic for the Courier Journal stated, "The work, 'Water is Life,' fits the context of all her sculptures and paintings, which are often about environmental issues."

In 2015, she founded the Artemis Initiative, an IRS approved 501(c)(3) Public Charity.

In 2018, her work honoring Alice Allison Dunnigan, the first African American female to receive White House and Congressional credentials, was unveiled at the Newseum in Washington, D.C. The statue of Alice Dunnigan traveled extensively and was featured for programming at Kentucky State University, University of Kentucky, and the Truman Presidential Library. The bronze sculpture of Alice Dunnigan now permanently stands at the SEEK Museum in Russellville, Kentucky, which was added to the United States civil rights trail in 2020.

In 2019, she was selected to create a monumental sculptural installation titled, "The Girl Puzzle", in New York City on Roosevelt Island honoring investigative reporter Nellie Bly, which was planned to be unveiled in 2020, but due to the COVID-19 Pandemic, was completed and unveiled on December 10, 2021.

On November 14, 2021, at Kentucky's COVID-19 Memorial Ceremony to mourn the over 10,000 Kentuckians who lost their life to the COVID-19 Pandemic, it was announced that Matthews design proposal "United We Stand, Divided We Fall" (based on the Kentucky State Motto) was chosen for the permanent Team KY COVID-19 Memorial Monument.

Matthews is Nettie Depp’s great-great niece, and a bronze statue of Nettie created by Matthews was approved for display in the Kentucky Capitol. It is the first permanent large-scale monument of a woman inside that state capitol. While Nettie's influence was not statewide, the Historic Properties Advisory Commission considered her a representative example of Kentucky women who achieved professional and personal success. The statue’s unveiling occurred in November 2022.

Sculptor, Amanda Matthews, addressed United Nations Delegates on Art, Advocacy, and Rights of Women on March 9, 2025 in New York City to launch the 69th United Nations Commission on the Status of Women and to commemorate the 30th anniversary of the Beijing Declaration and Platform for Action.

== Selected public works and collections ==
- 2021–present: Team Kentucky COVID-19 Memorial Monument, "United We Stand, Divided We Fall" for KY Capitol Monuments Collection
- 2014–2022: Life Size Bronze Portrait of Nettie Depp, public education champion from Kentucky, for KY State Capitol Building for KY Capitol Monuments Collection
- 2019–2021: Monumental Sculptural Installation honoring Investigative Journalist, Nellie Bly, New York City, Roosevelt Island, titled "The Girl Puzzle" at Lighthouse Park,; Collection: New York City Public Art Collection
- 2020–2021: Giant Ginseng Shade Sculpture for Legacy Grove Park, Collection: Greater Clark Foundation
- 2016–2019: Life Size Bronze Portrait of Alice Allison Dunnigan for Russellville, Kentucky Collection: SEEK Museum (part of US Civil Rights Trail)
- 2018–2019: 3D Letters and Plaques for "John Lewis – Good Trouble" Tribute Wall at Hartsfield-Jackson Atlanta International Airport, part of a team of artists that collaborated on the construction of the installation; Collection: Hartsfield-Jackson Atlanta Airport Collection
- 2015–2016: Life Size Bronze Portrait of Capt. Solomon Lee Van Meter Jr., pioneer aviator whose backpack parachute invention is featured in the Smithsonian National Air & Space Museum, Washington, D.C., for the Aviation Museum of Kentucky and Bluegrass Airport Permanent Collection
- 2014: Life Size Ancient Greek Boxer Olympian Bronze Reproduction, Jasmine Hill Gardens, a Public Botanical & Sculpture Garden & Museum, Montgomery, Alabama, Jasmine Hill Gardens Permanent Collection
- 2013: Bronze portrait of Dr. George Zach, retired conductor of Lexington Philharmonic installed in Singletary Center for the Arts, University of Kentucky Art Museum Permanent Collection
- 2012: Good Shepherd Catholic Church Baptismal Font, Frankfort, KY, Roman Catholic Diocese of Lexington Permanent Public Collection
- 2010: Life Size Bronze Stephen Elrod Memorial Sculpture installed at Georgetown College in Permanent Public Sculpture Collection
- 2009: St. Paul Catholic Church Baptismal Font, Lexington, KY, Roman Catholic Diocese of Lexington Permanent Public Collection
- 2007: Louisville Zoo, an AZA and AAM Museum, 210' Ephemeral Environmental Sculpture Installation, Water is Life
- 2006: City of Mainz, Germany Permanent Collection

== Nominations and awards ==
- 2023 – Awarded 2022 Governor's Award in the Arts, Artist Award
- 2022 – Elected Chair of the Kentucky Oral History Commission
- 2022 – Elected Vice Chair of the Kentucky Oral History Commission
- 2021 – Small Business Association (SBA) Pacesetter Award; awarded to Amanda Matthews, Prometheus Art for The Girl Puzzle Monument
- 2020 – Appointed as member of the Kentucky Oral History Commission by Governor Andy Beshear
- 2019 – Board/Committee Member, Monumental Women of Kentucky
- 2018 – NAWBO (National Association of Women Business Owners) Kentucky Chapter awards Matthews 2018 "Strive Business Owner of the Year" Award
- 2018 – National Association of Women in Construction (Lexington Bluegrass Chapter 367) Bluegrass Diamond Award

== Public mentions and media ==
- 2025 – WHAS11: 'Now is not the time to be silent' | Kentucky artist speaks to high profile United Nations members
- 2022 – CNN: Kentucky unveils statue of Nettie Depp, the first woman to have a permanent large-scale monument inside the state Capitol
- 2022 – LEX18 News: Nettie Depp statue unveiled at the Kentucky State Capitol
- 2021 – Office of NY Governor: Governor Hochul Announces Opening of the Girl Puzzle Monument Honoring Nellie Bly
- 2021 – NBC News Now: How Roosevelt Island sculptures amplify stories of strong women
- 2021 – CBS Saturday Morning News: Monument honoring journalist Nellie Bly opens: "This installation is spiritual"
- 2021 – Office of KY Governor: Kentucky Artist Amanda Matthews to construct permanent Team Kentucky COVID-19 Memorial
- 2021 – Lexington Herald Leader: 'Not just a number.' Kentucky art installation will honor 10,000-plus COVID-19 deaths
- 2021 – The Courier-Journal: 20 Months, more than 10,000 deaths: Kentucky memorializes those who have died from COVID
- 2021 – The Lily (Washington Post): This Massive Monument to Women is Quietly Taking Shape in New York City
- 2020 – New York Times: Placing Women on a Different Sort of Pedestal
- 2020 – Smithsonian Magazine: Kentucky State Capitol Will Unveil Its First Statue Honoring a Woman
- 2020 – Smithsonian Magazine: The Must-See Outdoor Art Installations of 2020 Amanda Matthews' The Girl Puzzle, New York City, listed 3rd on worldwide list of 9
- 2019 – C-SPAN: African American Journalist Alice Allison Dunnigan Harry S. Truman Presidential Library and Museum, Dr. Nancy Dawson, Amanda Matthews, Soraya Dunnigan presented
- 2019 – Winchester Sun: Shade Sculpture will soon 'grow' at Legacy Grove
- 2018 – Politics: First black female White House reporter gets Newseum statue, The Washington Post
- 2018 – NATIONAL: Alice Dunnigan, First Black Woman To Cover White House, Gets Statue At Newseum, NPR, All Things Considered
- 2018 – Alice Dunnigan, First Black Woman to Cover White House, Will Get Statue at Newseum, The New York Times
- 2017 – Kentucky Historic Properties Advisory Commission approves life-size sculpture of Nettie Depp for Kentucky Capitol
- 2016 – Dunnigan to be honored with bronze statue
- 2016 – Aviation Museum to unveil bronze sculpture of aviation pioneer Van Meter
- 2015 – Lexington sculptor seeks – and starts creating – more statues of notable Kentucky women, minorities, Lexington Herald Leader, Lexington, KY
- 2015 – Appeared in Documentary Film, Dreamers and Doers: VOICES of Kentucky Women
- 2015 – Restored Gratz Park 'kids' return to James Lane Allen fountain
- 2013 – Dr. George Zach bronze portrait unveiled at Singletary Center for the Arts, in Lexington, KY, University of Kentucky Art Museum Permanent Collection
- 2010 – Stephen Elrod Memorial bronze sculpture unveiled at Georgetown College
- April 22, 2007 – Water is Life Ephemeral Environmental Art Installation at the Louisville Zoo, Courier Journal, Critics Pick by Diane Heilenman, visual art critic
- July 2006 – Amanda Matthews (Fields) work featured in Germany's Der Mainzer Magazine
- May 2006 – Art World News magazine lists Amanda Matthews (Fields) on their Artists Worth Watching list.

== See also ==
- List of sculptors
- List of female sculptors
- List of contemporary artists
- List of American artists 1900 and after
- List of 20th-century women artists
- List of people from Kentucky
