= Nettie Depp =

Education Reformer

Nettie Bayless Courts Depp
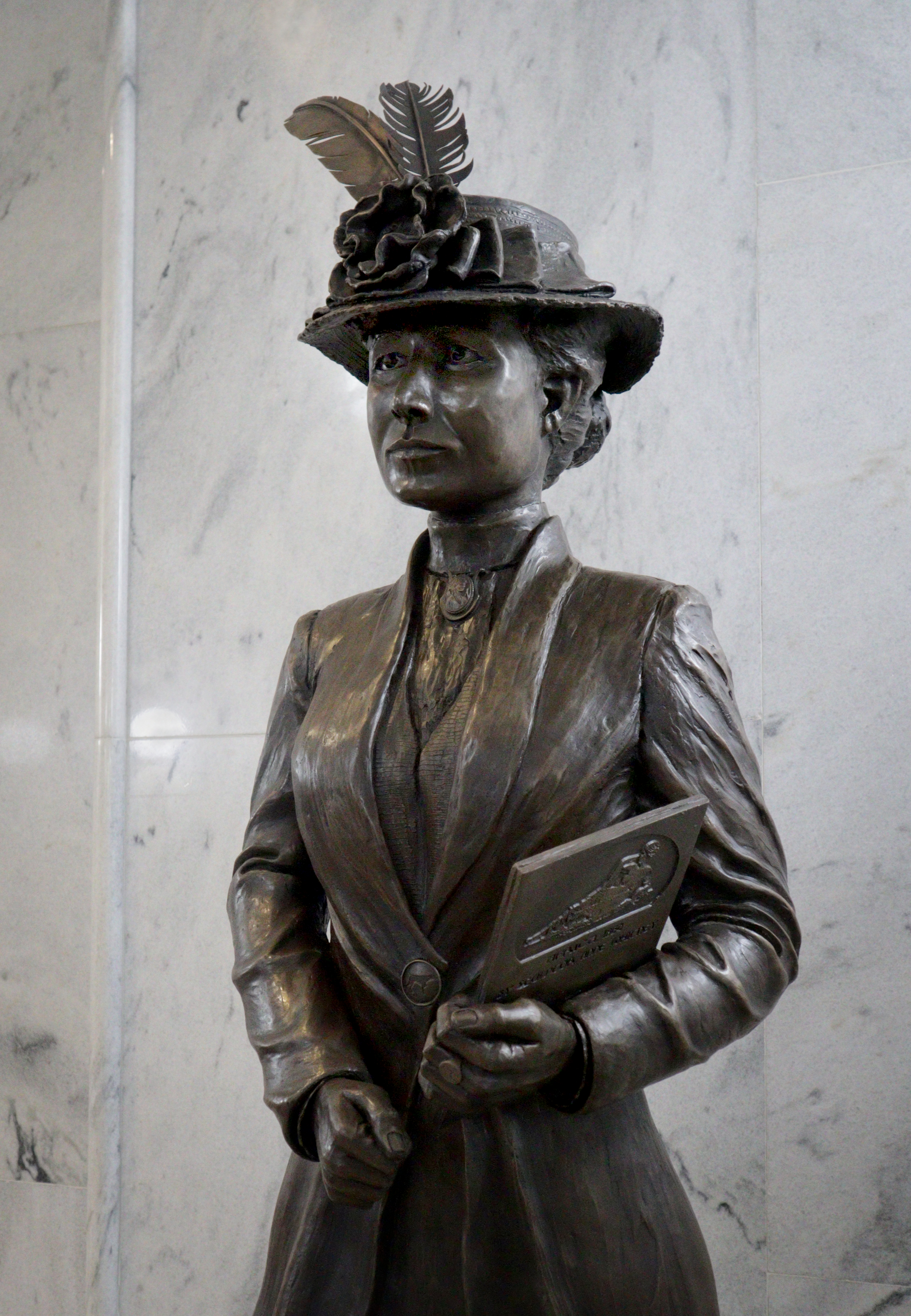
- Born: November 21, 1874; Barren County, Kentucky, US
- Died: August 3, 1932 (aged 57); Barren County, Kentucky, US
- Occupation: Educator
- Known for: First woman elected to public office in Barren County, Kentucky

Nettie Bayless Courts Depp (November 21, 1874 – August 3, 1932) was an education reformer and the first woman elected to public office in Barren County, Kentucky when she was elected Superintendent of Barren County Schools in 1913. She served from January 1, 1914, through December 31, 1917.

== Early life ==
Depp was the daughter of John Burks Depp, a member of the Kentucky House of Representatives, and of Mariba Elizabeth Reneau (1846–1928). She was one of six children, including Elizabeth Eola "Lizzie" Depp Allen, Mary Pitsy Depp Rowland, Tipton Hanson Depp, Oren Richard Depp, and Lillie Belle Depp Matthews. Her middle names came from her maternal great-grandmother, Mary Bayless Wood (1777–1863), and her paternal great-grandmother, Mary Hanson Courts Depp (1793–1840).

She was a member of Christian Church. Her grandfather, Isaac Tipton Reneau, was a well-known preacher in the Christian Church who served numerous churches in south central Kentucky and northern Tennessee.

== Education ==
Nettie B.C. Depp was educated in the common schools of Barren County, Kentucky. She was a graduate of Liberty Female College in Glasgow, Kentucky.

For more than a decade, Depp taught in various schools and concluded that expanding her own education to become a professional teacher would be her next goal. Depp enrolled at Southern Normal School, sometimes referenced as the Cherry Brothers' School (seminal institutions of Western Kentucky University), in Bowling Green, Kentucky to further her education. She studied under Dr. Henry Hardin Cherry, who became her mentor, and Thomas C. Cherry. As a student, Depp embraced the Cherry brothers' philosophies on education such as the Declaration on Principles and Policies for Southern Normal School which included goals such as:

- To be a live school and to impart to its students a burning zeal to do and be something.
- To be progressive, to use modern methods and equipment, but reject all worthless educational fads.
- To let the reputation of the school be sustained by real merit.
- To fight against ignorance, and for higher education and the liberation of the human soul.
- To instill in the minds of the students the great truth that every person is created to do something, to be a producer.
- To lead the student to understand that a broad and liberal education is essential to the highest degree of success in any endeavor in life.

During her studies in Bowling Green, Depp became an advocate of Henry Hardin Cherry's efforts to have the school accepted by the Commonwealth of Kentucky as a state normal school. Depp wrote a newspaper column for the Glasgow Times for several years using the pen name "Ora Ethel" and frequently used the opportunity to promote Cherry's school.

In her March 27, 1907 column, Depp wrote:

"There stands H.H. Cherry at the head of affairs; look at him, he has not so much avoirdupois as many, but he has the greatest influence upon a large student body of anyone I know. He controls that mass of humanity with the slightest effort. His power and influence is felt all over the city, county, and state; yes, and it broadens out until it reaches from ocean to ocean, for, are not there men and women from all parts of this grand old Union who are reaping the rewards from the self-government teachings that they receive here? No student can ever be in this school without realizing that self-government is in the soul, and that the un-governed spirit will never do much in this life. Within the walls of that building, boys and girls have been molded into educated men and women. Often upon entering, they could be compared to coarse rough ironware as it is dug from the earth. Here, they are placed under the best teachers that can be secured anywhere, and are carried through a thorough course of drawing out, until they, like the iron ore after it has been sheltered, heated and drawn out again and again, becomes the finest wrought steel."

In the same column, Depp challenged her fellow teachers to advance their own education:

"Teachers of Barren County, why are you neglecting your education? Why are you content to stay in the same old rut you were in long ago, when the State Normal offers not only you, but every teacher in the state such rich rewards.

On June 5, 1908, Nettie B.C. Depp earned a degree in education from Western Kentucky State Normal School, the first Barren County student to earn a degree from the institution.

== Professional career ==
Prior to attending Southern Normal as it transitioned into Western Kentucky State Normal School, Depp taught in numerous schools including various Barren County public schools including Bethel, Temple Hill (where she served as principal), Glasgow Junction; three years in Enid and Waukomis in the then-Oklahoma Territory.

In 1910, Nettie Depp went to work in Scottsville, Kentucky as a schoolteacher. She went reluctantly and felt she was underpaid as reflected in a letter she sent to Henry Hardin Cherry, then president of the Western Kentucky State Normal School, and a supporter of women's rights. She wrote to him then of her success in public speaking on behalf of education reform:

I tried to show the people the advantages the school gives and that they should use them as their own. If I only made one person see this in such a way that he will find his way into the school I shall feel that my little talk was not in vain.

Throughout her professional career, Depp was an advocate for fair pay for school teachers. In one of her newspaper columns relating to tax dollars, she wrote:

"Now, I can tell you why I place the schools first. It is this: We teachers take the children and teach them twenty days in the month for a little more than fifty-five cents each. Shame on you and all the rest of that class that would place higher value upon the sheep industry than you do upon the education of your people! How would you like to one child and care for it and train it for twenty days for fifty or sixty cents, say nothing of a whole community of them at the same low rate?"

While she was educating her pupils and defending fair pay for teachers, Depp was also an advocate for education. In one of her newspaper columns sharing the recent success of Bethel School, Depp editorialized with a message to parents:

"One word to school people, and most especially parents: Our governmental laws teach that wherever there is a right there is a corresponding duty. Parents, do you realize that one of the greatest rights your children can enjoy is the right to attend school? If it is a right it is indeed and in truth your duty to send them. You cripple them for life when you fail to educate them. Education means more than it did when you were children. Its value is above all the gold in the world. Then why not awake and give them what they need? It is in your power to give them a common school education, if no more. They need it and should not be robbed of their needs. Have a little less of this world's good rather than keep them away from school. This talk is for every parent, not only of my school, but of this county."

In another of Depp's columns while she was teaching at Bethel School, she addressed both teachers and parents:

"Teachers, we must realize that we have not only the mental but the moral and physical powers of childhood to develop. If we fail along these lines what will our country be in a short time? Who will be to blame for the ruin? I am bound to answer: teachers and parents. Who is to blame for the corruption of today? Unfair and false teachers and thoughtless parents. Now this sounds hard, and doubly so when it is said by a teacher, but it is high time that the judgement was beginning at home. I know that I have failed many times in doing what was best, but I have tried to be true to my profession, and I shall continue to try. I am anxious that all teachers, and especially young ones, see the need of being faithful and true."

== Running for office ==
Back in the classroom, Depp apparently grew weary of the role of politics in public schools. At the time, local school superintendents were not selected by the elected members of the school board; rather, would-be superintendents were elected by the voters and were considered county officials. Kentucky's compulsory attendance law requiring parents to send their children to school were loosely enforced. Recognizing Depp as a popular educator armed with a degree, both the Democratic and Republican Party committees viewed her as a highly qualified candidate.

In September 1909, the Barren County Republican Committee selected her as their choice of candidates to stand for election to become superintendent of county schools. Apparently, Depp was unaware of a plan to nominate her and her polite refusal became news. She faced three awkward situations: no woman had ever run for public office in Barren County, she was from a well-known family of Democrats, and her brother Oren R. Depp had sought the Democratic nomination for superintendent the previous cycle and lost.

On September 23, 1909, Depp wrote to S.T. Young, Chairman of the Republican Committee:

"My Dear Sir: I thank you people very, very much for the honor you have shown me. I believe you are sincere; I believe you are tired of rottenness - I know I am. Still under the embarrassing circumstances I cannot come out under either of the old heads at this time. Yours for success, Nettie B. Depp."

With much publicity about the Republican nomination, Depp felt it necessary to give the public some explanation which she did through a letter to the editor of the Glasgow Times published on September 28, 1909:

"'I'd rather be right than president,' are the words that have passed through my mind many, many times since last Monday night. Only the quotation was changed to suit my case. 'I'd rather be right than superintendent,' is the way I look at it. It would not be right for me to come out under another head after my brother running in confidence and trust under the one he did.

"While I thank the Republicans of my county for the honor they have given me, still I cannot accept their offer. Now, to make this plain to my friends, some of whom will be disappointed in my not accepting the nomination, I will say, that when I came home from Bowling Green from school last June and found you so eager for me to run for superintendent, I told you that I would come out if you would show me that the county was strong enough to elect me on a clean independent ticket. When I said that, I did not mean that I would come out under either of the old heads, but that I would come in the name of education.

"Since a child I have studied and studied hard to be a true woman. I have always tried to raise the standard of education above dishonesty and wrong. As it is, I feel that I would do wrong to accept the nomination. I want my friends to know that I am as true a believer in the Jeffersonian principles as ever lived.

"May God give us men and women that will work for true interest of their country.

/s/ Nettie B. Depp."

The following year, 1910, Depp accepted a position teaching in Scottsville where she was warmly welcomed professionally and socially. While becoming superintendent in her native Barren County may have been in her mind, it was overshadowed by the fact that her brother, Oren R. Depp, planned to seek the nomination in the next election cycle. He was head of the Hiseville school district in Barren County when he suddenly died at age 32 in March 1912.

Following Oren's death, talk of Nettie running for superintendent reemerged in the summer of 1912. Determined to show that local voters would support her candidacy, her advocates produced a petition bearing the signatures of 85 Barren County voters. She accepted the challenge and agreed to run as a representative of the Democratic Party more than a year before the 1913 General Election.

In the August Primary Election of 1913, Depp was confirmed as the Barren County Democratic Party's nominee. In mid-August, Depp was one of several Kentucky candidates for superintendent who were examined by the state board of education to confirm her qualifications to serve as superintendent. A few weeks later on September 10, candidates who met the requirements and granted certification were announced.

Depp was the first woman to run for public office in Barren County and the county's first female office-holder on January 1, 1914. In addition to a modest salary, the superintendent was provided an office and an apartment in the county courthouse.

Depp was one of 26 women who were elected superintendents of Kentucky Public Schools in the November 5, 1913 General Election.

== Superintendent of Barren County Schools ==
=== 1914-1915 ===
Taking office on January 1, 1914, Depp took on the challenge of overseeing nearly 100 segregated community school districts within Barren County, directing curricula, managing teachers and their professional development, constructing and maintaining facilities, poor roads, managing resources, and public relations.

In her biennial report to the Kentucky Superintendent of Public Instruction for 1915, Depp shared successes and areas needing improvement in Barren County Schools. She reported that Barren County's schools were not progressing as rapidly as she would like. In her first two years as superintendent, Depp built six new schools houses (including a four-room school building), repaired fifteen others, dug water wells, and built numerous outbuildings.

Like communities across the nation, Barren County's schools were segregated by race. Providing educational opportunities for African American students presented unique concerns. The vast majority of the African American population in Barren County were sharecroppers who moved from farm to farm. Depp clearly worried about how best to serve children in those families when she reported:

"We need some new [school] houses for colored children, as this population moves from place to place so rapidly that we need to put these [school] houses on wheels to keep up with the yearly moving."

Depp highlighted her expectations of teachers as well as the curricula taught:

"We are endeavoring to make our institutes progressive and helpful. We are anxious that our teachers come for a deeper motive than to show their new clothes, and the most of them have put their 'shoulders to the wheel,' and are striving to make our institutes all that they should be. Plans for vocal music in our schools, at least for morning exercises, have brought the necessity of a music instructor in our institute. One hour each day during the week will be devoted to music. Oh, that it may work the change that is so much needed! A song drives away childish troubles and makes work much easier. We are also trying to stress language and reading in such a way that innocent childhood will not always have to suffer on account of improper teaching along these lines of work.

"The Course of Study is made an objective point in our institute, and last year while visiting the schools, if I found a teacher who was not following this course, I marked his standard as a teacher low. We are going to try hard this year to have it followed by every teacher in the county.

"Many of our teachers are putting good libraries in their schools, and quite a number are taking advantage of the traveling library plan, which is working admirably."

When reporting on the county's four graded schools, Depp pronounced their work as excellent. Regarding one of those schools, Hiseville, Depp stated that the school house was being made larger and the school would have an additional teacher. She added that consolidation was under consideration as the area because "the country is level and the roads good, and as there are a number of small schools nearby, I believe this would be a big step in the right way." While Depp began the consolidation process, it would be more than 30 years before the dozens of schools into four districts was accomplished. An issue of concern for Depp was the modest success of Kentucky's compulsory school law. She explained that Barren County's Judge opined that the law was weak and didn't produce the anticipated results. Depp added,

"Mr. Superintendent, I hope this part of that law will be looked after in our next meeting of the General Assembly, and that we will, in the future, be able to reach every dilatory parent in the county, whether he votes for us again or not."

Depp's greatest accomplishment of the biennium was orchestrating the creation of Barren County's first four-year high school. At the time, Barren County's students had limited options for continuing their education after completing 8th grade; ideally, a local high school would expand educational opportunities exponentially. The Liberty District Baptist Association had closed Liberty Female College on Liberty Street in downtown Glasgow in 1913. Depp viewed the empty facility as ideal for a high school and negotiated a deal to lease the property. She reported:

"Last, but not least, is our county high school. Last year we worked and planned to unite the Glasgow Graded and Barren County High Schools. Finally, after about three months of careful deliberation on the part of the Barren County Board of Education and the Glasgow Graded School Board, we came together and framed a contract uniting the two schools. Results, where we had an enrollment of twenty before, and with two teachers handicapped so their work could not result as it should, we now have an enrollment of above seventy, and a faculty doubled. We have for the coming year secured our property, known as Liberty College. With an ideal location, excellent faculty and one of the best laboratories in the state, we are hoping to grow rapidly in the future."

=== 1916-1917 ===
Reporting on her third and fourth years as superintendent, Depp reported, "For almost four years we have labored faithfully to work out the faults so common in rural schools and to do good, honest work that will tell not only in the schools of the future, but for eternity." In her usual modest demeanor, she continued, "We feel that we have done nothing brilliant, nothing to boast of; we have simply been hunting for the right way and for the best methods, and as we have found them, we have gladly adopted them."

Depp reported that she had succeeded in establishing a uniform curriculum used throughout Barren County's public schools. "The Course of Study is no longer a shelf book, it has become a daily hand-book of useful information that the teacher know better than to leave out of his work," Depp explained.

During the biennium, Depp had overseen the construction of seven new school houses, the repair of thirty-five existing school houses, and prepared plans for four schools houses that needed extensive repairs or replacement, and put down numerous new wells. Summarizing this work, Depp concluded, "Even as it is, Barren County can boast of more comfortable school buildings than ever before."

The county's poor road conditions coupled with an abundance of large streams of water in the southern portion of the county presented challenges not easily resolved. It was necessary for several schools to be dismissed from time to time and resulting in emergency school sessions conducted as situations allowed. "It is hard to work out a plan that will...give all of the children proper school advantages. We feel like using the old biblical cry, 'Come over and help us.' Yet I doubt if you could do it with present laws and the natural inconveniences."

For the second biennium of her term, Depp was pleased with improvements in the compulsory school law. In 1916, six men were fined for not sending their children to school. In 1917, even fewer parents were cited.

During Depp's term in office, Barren County was assigned a county agent, A.C. Young, through the University of Kentucky Agriculture Extension Service. Young collaborated with Depp to establish corn and tomato clubs within the public schools. According to Depp's report, the clubs were eventually converted to agricultural clubs; the clubs ultimately became the first 4-H Clubs in the county. Depp lamented that due to Young being called to service in the U.S. Army, the progress of the clubs was greatly handicapped in 1917.

Depp reported that Barren County's schools were organized for participation in a county-wide school fair at which students and teachers showcased their respective schools for the citizens of the county.

The still-new four-year high school operating in the former facilities of Liberty College had grown rapidly from 70 students to 106 in 1916. Depp stated that the regular four-year state high school curriculum had been expanded to include vocal and instrumental music, expression, art, and a business course.

Depp concluded her final report, stating, "During the four years we have been able to meet debts amounting to $19,000 and we are justly proud that we can hand over the office keys to Mr. W.M. Totty, the newly elected superintendent, with no debt to impede further progress."

== Final years as an educator ==
After her term as superintendent, Depp was highly sought after. She was offered the principalship of the high school in Harlan, Kentucky but she accepted Cave City High School's offer to become principal. Depp remained in the position until 1923 when she returned to Scottsville High School where she served as a teacher and principal. Her health depleted by breast cancer, Depp ended her career in education in 1931.

== Suffrage and political involvement ==
While Depp never ran for public office again, she remained active in political work and suffrage for women.

The Commonwealth of Kentucky ratified the 19th Amendment to the U.S. Constitution on January 6, 1920, but it would be August of that year before enough states ratified the amendment to make it the law of the land. The U.S. Attorney General ruled that women would be allowed to voted in the November 1920 General Election.

In the meantime, Depp and other women were welcomed into the Barren County Democratic Party at its county convention on May 1, 1920. Her stature as a former elected official assured Depp's full involvement. Depp was appointed to the Resolutions Committee of the Barren County Democratic Party's local convention.

At the same meeting, Depp was one of 28 local women selected as voting delegates to the Kentucky Democratic Party convention on May 4, joining 35 male voting delegates to complete Barren County's delegation.

Not all of Depp's political involvement was partisan. On May 3, 1920, Depp was one of five Barren County women who attended and participated in the Kentucky League of Women Voters meeting in Louisville, Kentucky as the organization transformed itself from the former Kentucky Equal Rights Association.

== Death ==
Nettie Depp died of breast cancer on August 3, 1932. Her funeral was held at Refuge Church of Christ in Eighty-Eight, Kentucky. An estimated 1,500 people attended her funeral which was moved outdoors in an effort to accommodate the crowd. She was buried in her family's plot in the adjoining cemetery.

== Honors and Recognitions ==
In July 2013, Nettie B.C. Depp was honored with a Kentucky Historical Society marker (#2397) installed on the south-west corner of the lawn of the Barren County Courthouse in Glasgow, Kentucky. The marker was sponsored and funded by the Glasgow Business & Professional Women's Club.

Nettie B.C. Depp was a featured historical figure in the South Central Kentucky Cultural Center's annual event, Harvest of History, in September 2013. Elaine Alexander Richardson, a retired educator and former member of the Glasgow Independent School Board, portrayed Depp.

Nettie B.C. Depp was one of 46 women profiled in the documentary Dreamers and Doers: Voices of Kentucky Women produced by Michael Breeding Media for the Kentucky Commission on Women's Kentucky Women's History Project in 2015. Watch the video here: Dreamers & Doers: VOICES of Kentucky Women

Western Kentucky University enshrined Nettie B.C. Depp in the WKU Hall of Distinguished Alumni on October 26, 2018. She is the first graduate of one of WKU's seminal institutions to be so honored.

A seven-and-a-half-foot bronze statue by Amanda Matthews, Depp's great-great niece, was approved for display in the Kentucky Capitol. It is the first permanent large-scale monument of a woman inside that state capitol. While Nettie's influence was not statewide, the Historic Properties Advisory Commission considered her a representative example of Kentucky women who achieved professional and personal success. The statue's unveiling occurred in November 2022.

== Other ==
Nettie B.C. Depp was the great-great aunt of actor Johnny Depp, who himself is the great-grandson of Nettie's brother, Oren R. Depp.
