= Chris Offutt =

American writer (born 1958)

Christopher John Offutt (born August 24, 1958) is an American writer. He is most widely known for his short stories and novels, but he has also published three memoirs and multiple nonfiction articles. In 2005, he had a story included in a comic book collection edited by Michael Chabon, and another in the anthology Noir. He has written episodes for the TV series True Blood and Weeds.

== Early life and education ==
Chris Offutt was born in Lexington, Kentucky, the son of Andrew J. Offutt, an author, and his wife Jodie. His brother Jeff Offutt is a professor of software engineering. He has two sisters: Scotty Hyde, who lives in Bowling Green, Kentucky, and Melissa Offutt, who lives in San Diego. They grew up in Haldeman, a small former mining community located in Rowan County in the Appalachian Mountain foothills of eastern Kentucky. They all attended public schools. Offutt quit high school intending to join the army, but failed the physical. Offutt subsequently attended Morehead State University and graduated with a degree in theater and a minor in English. After college, he hitchhiked around the country, taking more than 50 jobs, all part-time, and began writing.

Offutt later attended the Iowa Writers' Workshop.

== Literary career ==
In 1992, Offutt published his first short story collection, Kentucky Straight. His second book was the 1993 memoir The Same River Twice. In 1997 he published his first novel, The Good Brother. In 1998 he published Two-Eleven All Around.

In 1999, he published his second collection of stories, Out of the Woods. His next book was a memoir, No Heroes: A Memoir of Coming Home (2002), about a six-month return to Rowan County where he had lived as a child.

Offutt's story, “Chuck’s Bucket,” was included in McSweeney’s Mammoth Treasury of Thrilling Tales (2002), edited by Michael Chabon. In 2005, Offutt made his comic book debut when he wrote "Another Man's Escape" for Michael Chabon Presents: The Amazing Adventures of the Escapist. A second comic is included in the anthology Noir, from Dark Horse Comics.

Offutt has been a visiting faculty member at the Iowa Writers' Workshop, the University of Montana, the University of New Mexico, Grinnell College, Morehead State University, and Mercer University. He is teaching at the University of Mississippi as visiting faculty.

In addition to his fiction, Offutt writes non-fiction articles, which have been published in The New York Times, Men's Journal, and the Oxford American and aired on National Public Radio. His work is widely translated, and it is taught in high schools and colleges. His stories are included in many anthologies, including Best American Short Stories, and New Stories of the South (four works). They have twice been featured on "Selected Shorts" on NPR. He has also written screenplays for TV series.

== Honors ==
His work has received awards from the Lannan Foundation, Guggenheim Foundation, the American Academy of Arts and Letters, and the National Endowment for the Arts. He received a Whiting Award in Fiction and Nonfiction. In 1996 Offutt was named one of the twenty best young American fiction writers by Granta magazine.

== Works ==
=== Bibliography ===
==== Mick Hardin mysteries ====
- The Killing Hills (2021)
- Shifty's Boys (2022)
- Code of the Hills (2023)
- The Reluctant Sheriff (2025)

=== Other novels ===
- The Good Brother (1997)
- Country Dark (2018)

=== Collections ===
- Kentucky Straight: Stories (1992)
- Out of the Woods (1999)

=== Short works ===
- Two-Eleven All Around (1998)
- "Moscow, Idaho," Originally Published in Granta 54: Best of Young American Novelists

=== Memoirs ===
- The Same River Twice: A Memoir (1993)
- No Heroes: A Memoir of Coming Home (2002)
- My Father, the Pornographer: A Memoir (February 2016)

=== Stories and articles ===
- "Chicken Eggs", Oxford American, Spring 2014
- "My Dad, the Pornographer", New York Times Magazine, 5 February 2015
- "Trash Food", Oxford American, Spring 2015

=== Television ===
- True Blood
  - "Burning House of Love" (1x07)
  - "I Don't Wanna Know" (1x10)
- Weeds
  - "A Distinctive Horn" (5x08)
