= Solomon Lee Van Meter Jr. =

American inventor

Coordinates: 38°02′47″N 84°29′49″W

- Born: 8 April 1888; Shenandoah Hall, Fayette County, Kentucky, United States
- Died: 3 November 1937 (aged 49); Lexington, Kentucky
- Resting place: Lexington Cemetery, Kentucky
- Education: Transylvania University; University of Iowa; Exeter College
- Known for: Backpack parachute
- Spouse: Lois Chapin (1924–1937)

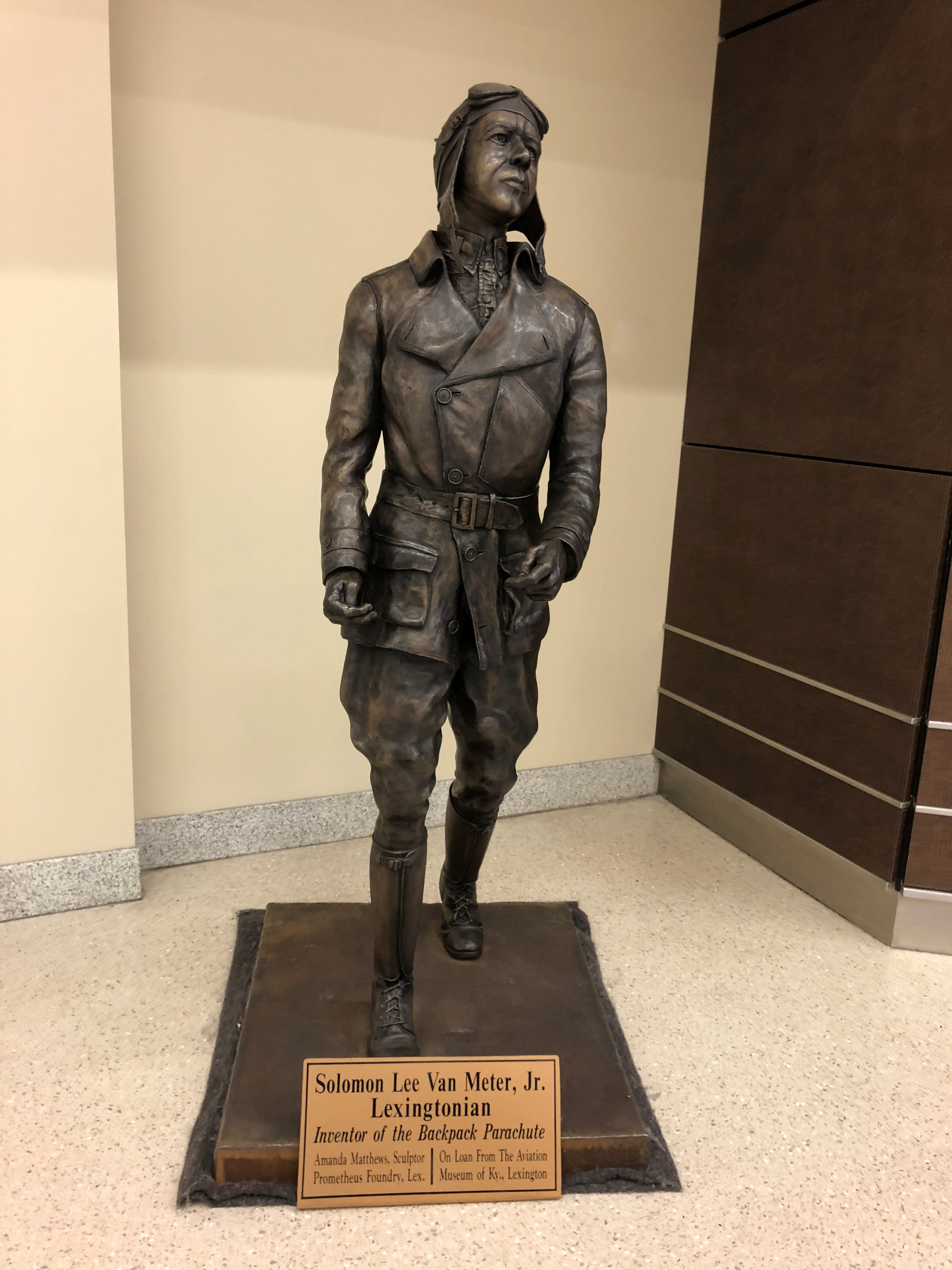
A statue of Meter in the Lexington, Kentucky airport

Solomon Lee Van Meter Jr. (April 8, 1888 - November 3, 1937) was an American inventor, famous for inventing the first successful backpack parachute.

== Early life ==
Solomon Lee Van Meter Jr. was born as Joseph Atkins Van Meter in a cabin behind where his family's country residence, Shenandoah Hall, stands today on Bryan Station Pike in Fayette County, Kentucky. His parents were Solomon Lee Van Meter and Evaline Trent "Evie" Swoope. He was the second of five siblings, and two half-siblings. His name was changed to Solomon Lee Van Meter Jr. before the 1900 Census.

His early education was at Miss Collier's Private School. He began tertiary education at Transylvania University, then at the University of Iowa, and finally Exeter College at Oxford University.

== Career ==
In 1910, Van Meter became the inventor of the first successful backpack parachute and filed for a patent on March 27, 1911. On July 25, 1916, he was granted patents on "inventions for saving the lives of aviators by the use of parachutes." including the Aviatory Life Buoy, Patent # 1,192,479. Van Meter joined the United States Army in 1917 in the wake of World War I. He, and two other students in his class, were commissioned to First Lieutenant of the Marine Corps Aviation. A model of his invention was built at Wright Field in 1918. After its successful testing, the United States Army allowed the Irving Air Chute Company to build parachutes for government use. In the meantime, Van Meter was assigned to McCook Field in Dayton, Ohio, where he was sent to improve his invention. Lt. Van Meter tested his invention himself on June 14, 1926, at West Point Academy.

Van Meter also invented the ejection seat, although was never properly credited for the invention.

== Marriage and family ==
Solomon Lee Van Meter Jr. married Lois Chapin on June 2, 1924, in Falls Church, Fairfax County, Virginia. They had four children, three daughters and one son:

- Solomon Lee Van Meter III; 1925–1953; soldier in the Korean War.
- Lois Lynn Van Meter; 1928–Present; Married James Leslie Parrish
- Mary McDowell Van Meter; 1931–Present; Married Hilary Johnson Boone Jr.
- Virginia Paul Chapin Van Meter; born 1938; Married William Robinson Patterson Jr. Died in Fayette Co, KY.

== Death ==
Solomon Lee Van Meter Jr. retired from the military, with the rank of captain. He died from an undisclosed illness on November 3, 1937, in Lexington, Kentucky, at the age of 49. He was interred at Lexington Cemetery on November 5, 1937.

== Monument ==
A life-size bronze portrait of Solomon Lee Van Meter Jr was created by artist Amanda Matthews and unveiled in 2016 at the Aviation Museum of Kentucky and the Blue Grass Airport in Lexington, Kentucky.
