= The Lily (Washington Post) =

- Available in: English
- Owner: The Washington Post
- Editor: Neema Roshania Patel
- Website: www.thelily.com
- Commercial: Yes
- Launched: June 12, 2017; 9 years ago

The Lily was a publication of The Washington Post targeting millennial women launched on June 12, 2017.

The publication was purposefully multiplatform, with a presence on Instagram, Facebook, Twitter and the Web. The platform also included a semi-weekly email newsletter, Lily Lines. The web publication initially utilized the Medium platform. In February 2018, the publication transitioned from Medium to the Post's suite of publishing tools, Arc. In February 2022, the web presence moved to the Washington Post website. In 2022, the Washington Post folded the publication into its general coverage and reassigned the team to other editorial desks, and in 2023 retired its social media accounts.

The Lily team at The Washington Post included Amy King (editor in chief and creative director), Neema Roshania Patel (deputy editor), Ross May (art director), Maria Alconada Brooks (art director), Nneka McGuire (multiplatform editor), Lena Felton (multiplatform editor), Maya Sugarman (video editor) and Rachel Orr (comics editor).

The Lily was named as an homage to The Lily, an American newspaper published for women between 1849 and 1853.

== Awards ==
The Lily won several awards in the Society for News Design's Best of Digital Design for 2018, including a silver medal overall portfolio, and a bronze medal for the design of “The Lily Lines” newsletter.

Lily Lines was also a 2018 Webby Award Winner in the email newsletter category.
