= The Girl Puzzle =

Public sculpture on Roosevelt Island in New York City, U.S.

Coordinates: 40.77256°N 73.94042°W

- Artist: Amanda Matthews
- Year: 2021
- Medium: 5 bronze sculptures, 3 stainless steel spheres, walkway and plaza with plaques offering audio links for descriptions of each sculpture
- Location: Lighthouse Park, northern tip of Roosevelt Island, Manhattan, New York, U.S.

The Girl Puzzle is a public sculptural installation by American artist Amanda Matthews honoring activist and journalist Elizabeth Cochrane Seaman (1864–1922), better known as Nellie Bly. The installation is located on the northern tip of Roosevelt Island in Lighthouse Park (named after the Blackwell Island Light) in the New York City borough of Manhattan. The location is significant because of its proximity to the remains of the old Blackwell Island Asylum: the Octagon is the last remnant of the original building where Bly went undercover as a patient while working as a reporter for the New York World. Bly wrote of the mistreatment of patients at the asylum in a series of articles and then in 1887 had them compiled into a book, Ten Days in a Mad-House.

The Roosevelt Island Operating Corporation (RIOC) awarded the project to Matthews as the result of a widely published open call for artists. In a press release from New York Governor Andrew Cuomo, Susan Rosenthal (the then President and CEO of RIOC) stated, "The committee, made up of RIOC employees and community leaders, unanimously selected this bold installation that will not only represent Nellie Bly's time here, but her impact on the world." The initial unveiling was scheduled for 2020, but was rescheduled to 2021 due to the COVID-19 pandemic.

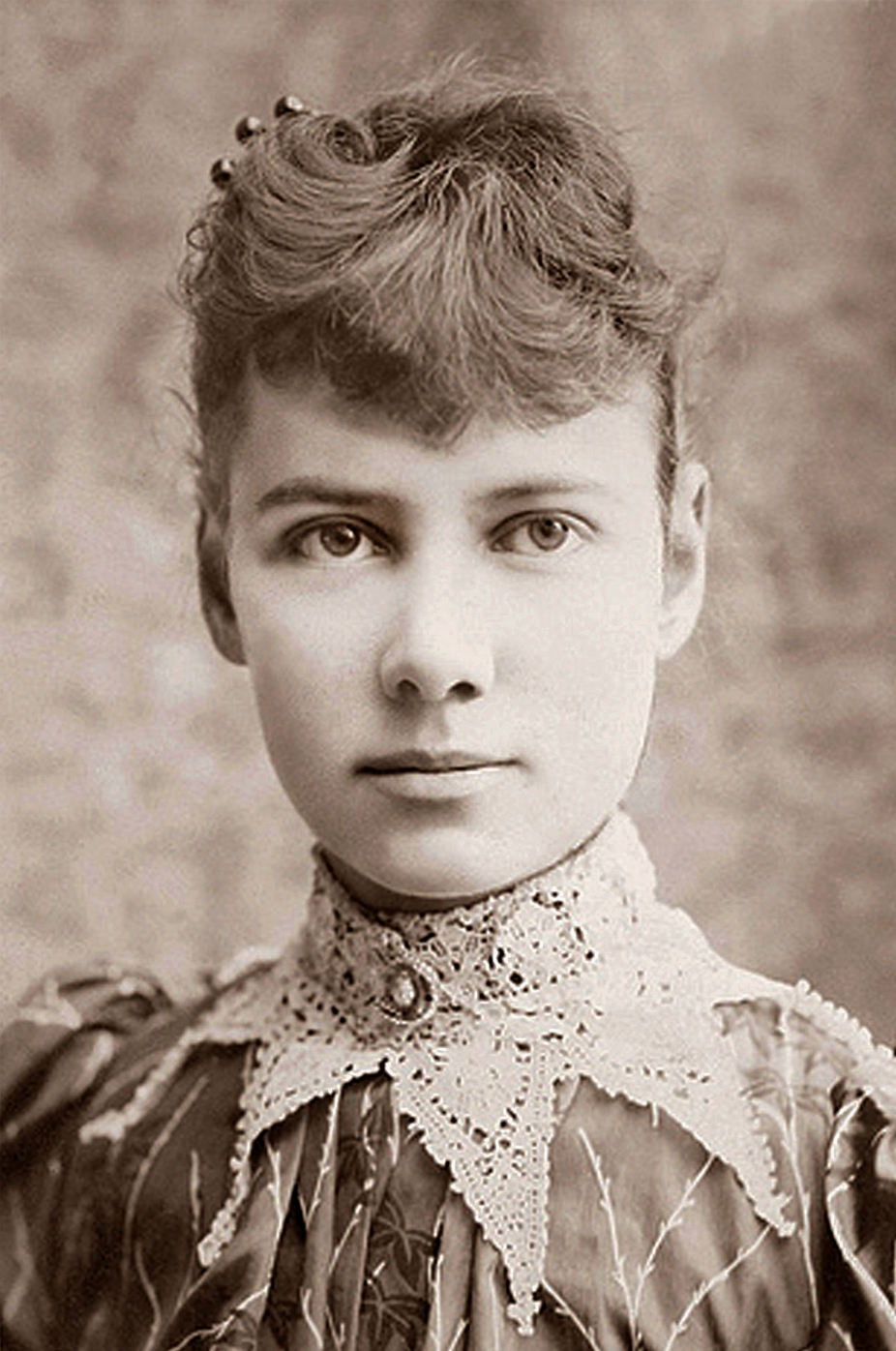
Nellie Bly circa 1890

== Concept ==
Amanda Matthews named the art installation after Nellie Bly's first published article, "The Girl Puzzle", which ran on January 25, 1885, in the Pittsburgh Dispatch newspaper. Only twenty years old, coming from a large working-class family, Bly had bravely responded to a previously published misogynist complaint about women wage-earners, and the editor hired her to write again for the newspaper, eventually as a full-time reporter. She chose her pseudonym after the title of a popular song by Stephen Foster, "Nelly Bly", but the misspelling of "Nellie" by the newspaper stuck. Her series of articles exposing the harrowing experiences of women factory workers in Pittsburgh led to the anger of local industrialists, and she eventually left to serve as a foreign correspondent in Mexico.

=== Nellie Bly's undercover work in New York ===
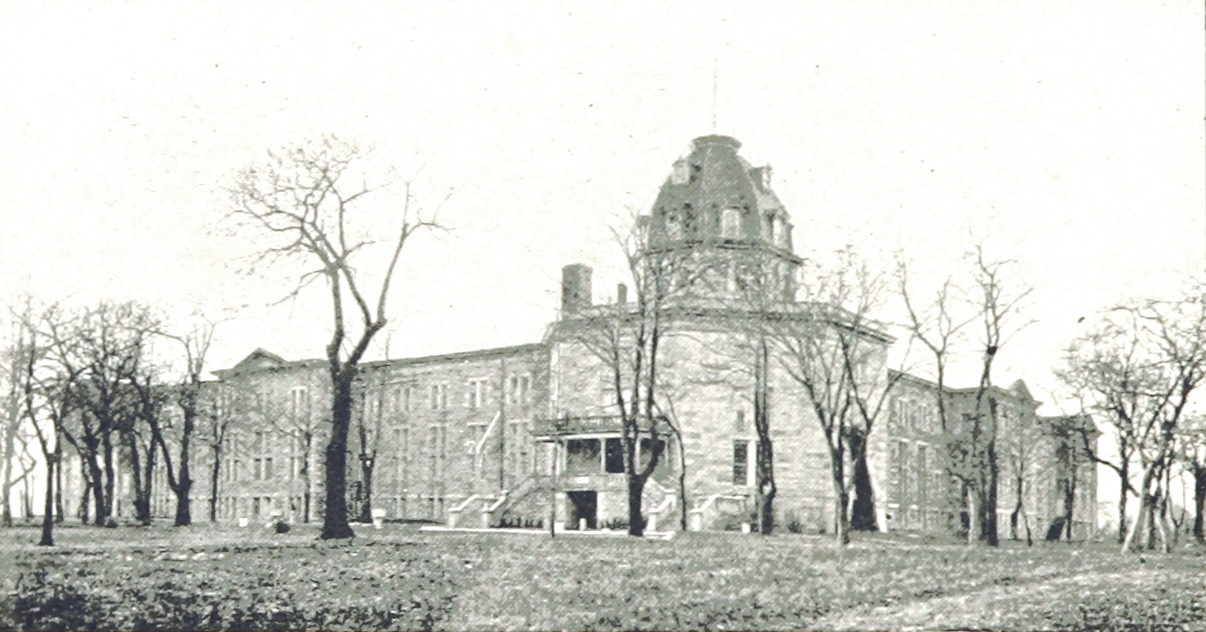
New York City Asylum for the Insane, 1890s

In 1887 Bly went to New York City and began working as the first female reporter for the New York World. She planned a ruse in which she would trick everyone into being admitted to the notoriously violent New York City Lunatic Asylum on Blackwell's Island, now Roosevelt Island, in the East River. Assuming the name Nellie Brown, she began her journey at a boarding house for women and quickly convinced the house matron, the policemen sent to remove her, the judge and eventually the Asylum's overworked psychiatrists that she was insane. She experienced not only the worst of the misogynist and xenophobic assumptions by the city's bureaucracy but also the abusive treatment of those deemed mentally ill. After only a few days, she tried to convince the asylum staff that she was not ill, but it was only after the New York World sent an attorney that she was finally released. Her first article (of six), "Behind Asylum Bars," ran on Sunday, October 9, 1887, and the City aldermen allotted an extra one million dollars a year to correct the abuses that Bly eventually exposed in her full report Ten Days in a Mad-House.

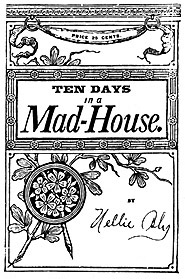
Cover of Bly's book Ten Days in a Mad-House

=== Three parts to the installation ===
The installation takes up the center of the Lighthouse Park, a 3.5-acre park at the northern tip of Roosevelt Island, with a 50-foot-tall lighthouse constructed by asylum patients in 1872[6] and listed in the National Register of Historic Places in 1972.[7] The community park was designed by landscape architect Nicholas Quennell in 1977 to encourage visitors to bring picnics or to fish.[8] The installation will bind the two landmarks—the remains of the New York Insane Asylum, The Octagon, and the lighthouse—together. 

The artist, Amanda Matthews, described the importance of Nellie Bly's undercover work at the asylum, asserting that Bly "gave a voice and a face to women who had no visibility or prominence in society." The installation is composed of three distinct parts:

- Five, giant seven-foot tall bronze faces represent different women, including a portrait of Nellie Bly. Each of the four other faces is rendered in partial sections to make them appear as puzzle pieces but also to show the depth of emotions of being broken and repaired.
- Three large stainless steel spheres within the walkway, represent different stages of Bly's life and career.
- The plaza itself, in which a 60-foot walkway and access walkway join the east and west promenades, allows visitors to view the spheres and faces from multiple angles, while seeing themselves and the surrounding cityscape in the reflective surfaces of the spheres. In this way, the viewer becomes part of the Girl Puzzle.

==== Faces ====
The portrait of Nellie Bly as a young woman is cast in silver bronze. The other faces, cast in bronze and portrayed in broken sections, include an Asian-American woman, an African-American woman, a young girl, and an older LGBTQ woman. These women are not specific people from Bly's life, but are inspired by women in the artist's life. The Asian-American woman's face was inspired by a woman who was 18 years old when, by Executive Order, she was imprisoned at the Rohwer War Relocation Center for several years. The African-American woman's face was inspired by a mother who dedicated her life to helping others after enduring the grief and agony of losing her infant child. The young girl's face depicts a child who was the subject of court cases where she had no voice. The older woman depicts a member of the LGBTQ community who has publicly advocated for civil rights and equality. Words written by Nellie Bly are inscribed on the inside of the female faces, providing visual and written clues to the story of marginalized and impoverished working women's lives.

==== Spheres ====
The three stainless steel spheres represent different stages of Nellie Bly's life. They increase in size, from two feet to four feet then six feet tall, showing her amplified voice over the course of her career as an investigative journalist, women's rights advocate, inventor and patent holder. Her trip around the world, traveling seventy-two days mostly on her own, is represented in the largest sphere. For the park visitor, the mirrored spheres allow for a visual representation of themselves "as part of the story."

==== Plaza and Walkway ====
The 60-foot walkway leads the visitor from the direction of The Octagon toward the lighthouse at the north end of Roosevelt Island. At the northern end of the plaza is the silvery bronze portrait of Bly. The accessible pathway, with space for visitors who use wheelchairs, includes braille plaques with audio links describing each face. The plaza thus creates a ADA compliant experience. The plaza is inspired by Japanese Zen Gardens, honoring Bly's love of Japan.

== Installation ==
The installation of The Girl Puzzle was planned for April 2021. However, the official opening of the monument finally occurred on Friday, December 10, 2021, at Roosevelt Island’s Lighthouse Park (910 Main Street). The opening of the monument, according to the announcement by New York Governor Kathy Hochul was set on a day to coincide with International Human Rights Day. Press coverage included:

- Forbes
- CBS Mornings
- CBS News (video clip)
- NBC News Now
- New York Yimby
- Women in Journalism

== See also ==
- List of public art in Manhattan
