= Haldeman, Kentucky =

Unincorporated community in Kentucky, United States

Haldeman
- Unincorporated community
- Location within the state of Kentucky Haldeman (the United States)
- Coordinates: 38°15′10″N 83°19′07″W
- Country: United States
- State: Kentucky
- County: Rowan
- Elevation: 994 ft (303 m)
- Time zone: UTC-5 (Eastern (EST))
  - Summer (DST): UTC-4 (EDT)
- GNIS feature ID: 512502

Haldeman is an unincorporated community located in Rowan County, Kentucky. It is 6 miles northeast of Morehead, the county seat.

== History ==
Haldeman was established in 1907 by L. P. Haldeman in order to house workers for his Kentucky Firebrick Company. 15 years later in 1922, a second and more efficient brick plant opened in Haldeman. It was estimated that several hundred workers were employed by these plants during their operation. Shortly after World War II, the original plant closed. In 1958, the second plant closed, ceasing all brick making operations for the community. Along with the brick factories, there was also a school constructed in 1936 that was ultimately closed in 1991, and partially destroyed by an arsonist's fire on September 28, 2007. A post office was built at the beginning of the towns formation, and was in operation from 1907 to 1997.
