= Western Kentucky University swim team hazing scandal =

2015 hazing scandal at Western Kentucky University

In 2015, there was a hazing scandal involving the swimming and diving program at Western Kentucky University (WKU). Investigations into the allegations began in January of that year and revealed instances of hazing dating back to at least 2012. The scandal resulted in the university placing the entire program on a five-year suspension, though, due to budget cuts, the program has not been reinstated as of 2026.

WKU is a public university in Bowling Green, Kentucky, whose swimming program had been noted for a history of success over several decades, including training one Olympic gold medalist. In January 2015, Collin Craig, a former member of the team, filed a report with the Bowling Green Police Department alleging several incidents of hazing that he had experienced the previous year as a freshman. The allegations included accusations of abuse, physical assault, and sexual assault, among other wrongdoing. Following a search of a house in which Craig said the incidents took place, the police charged one swim team member with possession of cannabis and drug paraphernalia. The search also revealed evidence of hazing, which prompted an investigation by the university's Title IX coordinator. The coordinator found a culture of hazing dating back several years which the coaching staff had been aware of but had not directly addressed in a consistent manner.

In April 2015, the university announced that the program would be placed on a five-year suspension and that the coaches would be terminated. The following year, Craig filed a federal lawsuit against the university and several administrators, coaches, and former team members, eventually settling out of court for $75,000. In 2018, budget cuts resulted in the funds being held for the swimming program being eliminated, casting doubt on the revival of the program. The WKU scandal is one of several that have affected collegiate swimming programs in the 2010s and 2020s, as several programs since have faced similar issues with hazing, sometimes resulting in team suspensions and investigations.

== Background ==
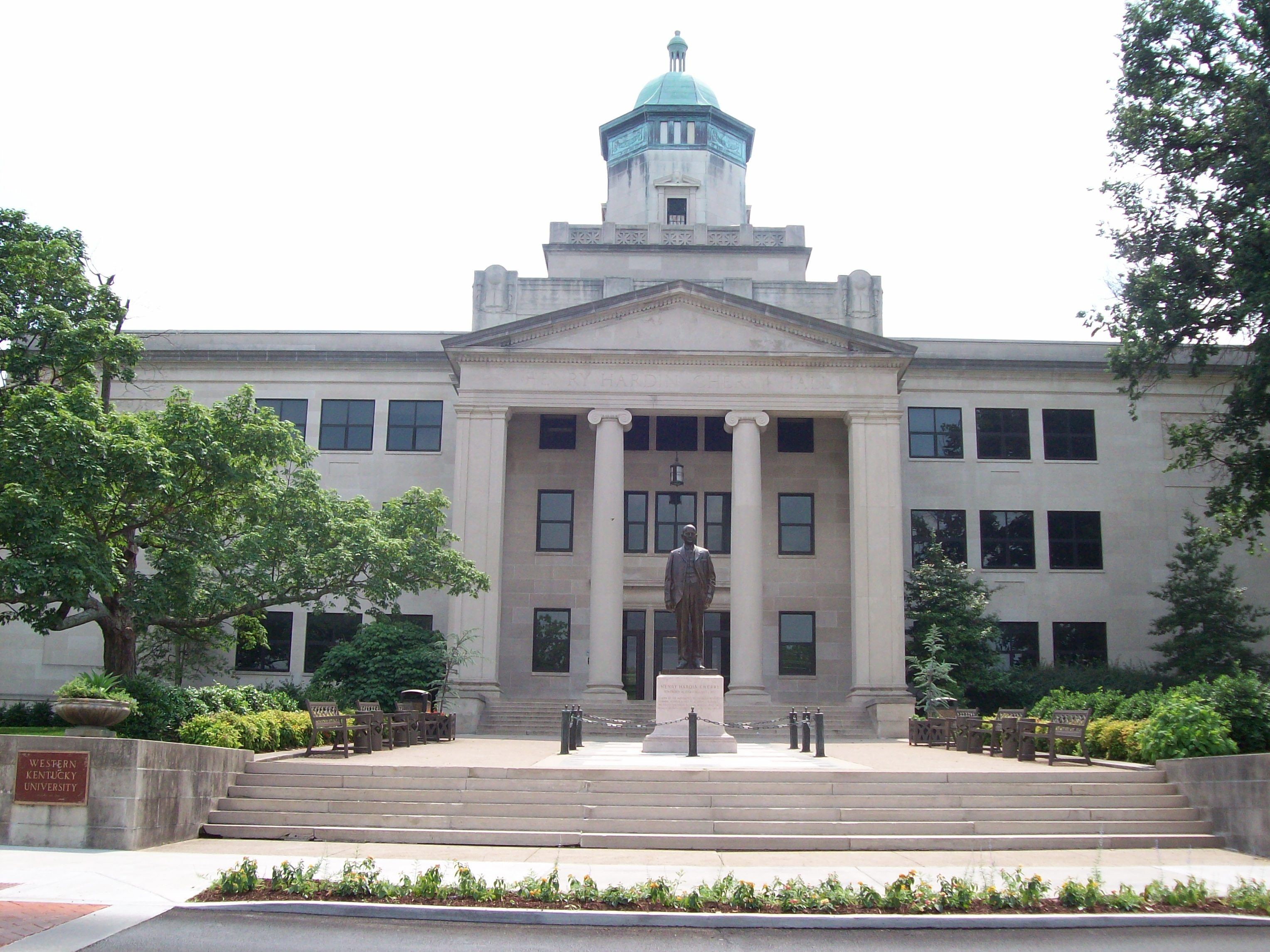
Henry Hardin Cherry Hall on the campus of Western Kentucky University in Bowling Green, Kentucky, pictured 2008

Western Kentucky University (WKU) is a public university in Bowling Green, Kentucky. According to multiple sources, the university's swimming and diving programs had, by the 2010s, developed a "rich history" that included numerous consecutive winning seasons and conference championships for both the men's and women's teams. In 2005, Bruce Marchionda became the programs' head coach, and under his leadership, the programs trained several high-profile swimmers, such as Olympic athlete Claire Donahue and All-American Fabian Schwingenschlögl, who were both training at the university in 2015. At that time, there were about 50 people who were either athletes in the programs or members of the coaching staff.

== Whistleblowing ==
On January 4, 2015, Collin Craig, a former freshman student and member of the swim team at WKU, filed a ten-page report with the Bowling Green Police Department (BGPD) alleging several instances of abuse by fellow members of the swim team. In his email to the police, Craig said that he had been physically assaulted and forced to drink alcohol by other swim team members as part of hazing. Craig described a common occurrence of being "sung to", where upperclassmen would sing a drinking song while underclassmen were required to drink a beer within 30 seconds. Additionally, the upperclassmen would hit the underclassmen in their genitals while they drank. Craig said that he had been "sung to" at at least 27 parties and was called derogatory names when he vomited. Craig also told the police that he had witnessed the sexual assault of a drunk female recruit and that a false accusation of rape had been threatened against him. Craig said that the events began in August 2014 and had continued throughout the Fall 2014 semester.

In response to the accusations, Bob Skipper, a member of the WKU Public Affairs Office, said, "Hazing is not tolerated, period. That is a culture we do not want on our campus. Fortunately, we haven't dealt with a situation like this in many years." In addition to notifying the police, Craig also submitted a formal complaint of sexual harassment to Huda Melky, WKU's Title IX coordinator and equal opportunity employment (EEO) director, via letter on January 7. Melky and Joshua Hayes, the university's Title IX investigator and EEO assistant director, then had a telephone interview with Craig and his father on January 19.

== Investigations ==
=== Police investigation ===
Following Craig's email, the BGPD obtained a search warrant for a house in which Craig said the hazing incidents occurred. The house, located in Bowling Green, had been occupied by various members of the swim team for several years and had a reputation as a place where large parties occurred. During the search, police seized, among other things various cannabis paraphernalia (including two smoking pipes, two herb grinders, and a pill bottle containing cannabis stems) and five picture boards. These picture boards contained photo collages depicting students who were visibly suffering from substance intoxication. Some of the photographs depicted individuals who were naked or near-naked, including one of a female in a bathroom with her underwear pulled down. Additionally, some of the intoxicated individuals had demeaning statements and images written on them, such as an image of a penis and a racial slur. In a 2015 article in USA Today, journalist Jonathan Lintner wrote that some of the images were "photos detailing sexual assault". The police investigation concluded on February 26.

=== Title IX investigation ===
In late February, the BGPD showed Melky and Hayes the picture boards they had obtained, after which the two initiated a Title IX investigation into the matter. On April 6, following the conclusion of the investigation, the two issued a memorandum stating that there was a "preponderance of evidence" indicating that hazing, sexual assault, and sexual harassment had occurred in violation of both the school's Student Code of Conduct, Discrimination and Harassment Policy and Title IX Sexual Misconduct/Assault Policy. According to their report, freshman members of the swim team were pressured into consuming alcohol, despite being underage, and in some cases, high school recruits may have been offered and accepted alcoholic beverages from members of the team. Additionally, freshman team members were subjected to a series of calisthenics exercises called the "freshman fuck around" and had embarrassing moments recorded and replayed by other team members as a form of ridicule, inflicting psychological abuse.

The investigation also revealed that the swim team's head coach Bruce Marchionda had been aware of the hazing since at least the spring of 2012, as evidenced by an email he had received from a former swimmer, but had enacted inconsistent disciplining that, by design, did not impact the program's ability to compete in championship meets and other competitions. Additionally, none of the coaches had reported sexual harassment incidents as required under Title IX. Melky and Hayes also discovered that Marchionda was aware that multiple members of the swim team had been arrested previously for cannabis possession, cannabis use, public intoxication, and theft. As reported by SwimSwam, the report offered three courses of action:

1. Individual students accused in the complaint should be referred to the Office of Judicial Affairs for further action.
2. Athletic Director Todd Stewart should determine the appropriate next steps regarding team leadership.
3. AD Stewart should consider the involvement of the swim team from an organizational perspective for its future.

The report was publicly released on April 7.

== Aftermath ==
In response to the Title IX memorandum, WKU President Gary Ransdell said in a statement to the College Heights Herald, WKU's student newspaper, that he had "serious concerns ... We are taking it very seriously and will address it ... It'll take a little time to deal with it, but we'll deal with it". On April 14, slightly over a week after the Title IX investigation concluded, Melky announced that she would be retiring from WKU.

=== Program suspension ===
On April 14, in direct response to the Title IX investigation, the university announced that the men's and women's swimming and diving programs would be suspended for five years. Additionally, the coaching positions for Marchionda, associate head coach Brian Thomas, and head diving coach Chelsea Ale, would be terminated effective June 30, the end of the fiscal year. As part of the announcement, WKU's athletic director Todd Stewart also stated that the student athletes on the swimming and diving programs would be free to transfer to other colleges and universities. Anyone who wished to remain at WKU would have their athletic scholarships honored, so long as they remained in good standing with the university. Discussing the program suspension, Ransdell said, "We have high standards for student conduct and conduct of our student organizations. The pervasive culture of misconduct in the swimming and diving program is intolerable. A five-year suspension is both necessary and prudent." Additionally, the university stated that violations of their student code of conduct would be handled by the university's office of judicial affairs.

==== Responses from coaches and swimmers ====
On the same day that the suspension was announced, former head coach Bill Powell, who had also founded and served as the first coach for the programs, put out a statement saying that he felt the university's decision went too far in punishing individuals not directly involved in the alleged wrongdoings. On April 22, Marchionda released a statement addressing the decision, stating in part, "With the clarity that only hindsight can afford, I accept the criticism that more supervision over the team members' personal conduct outside of Program activities should have been in place." However, WHAS-TV, the ABC affiliate in Louisville, Kentucky, noted in their reporting of the announcement that the coach "stops short of an apology". Donahue, when asked about the suspension, called it a "death sentence", but stated that she was intent on continuing her training under Marchionda at a different facility. At the time, Donahue, who had won a gold medal in a swimming competition at the 2012 Summer Olympics, was training as a postgraduate at WKU under Marchionda.

==== Transfers from Western Kentucky ====
By June 2015, according to Stewart, about 75 percent of Western Kentucky's swim team had transferred or were in the process of transferring to another university. That same month, Schwingenschlögl, who had earned All-America honors at WKU and was training to compete in the NCAA Division I men's swimming and diving championships, announced that he would be transferring to the University of Missouri. The following year, he placed first in the 2016 NCAA Division I Men's Swimming and Diving Championships in the 100-yard breaststroke competition, giving Missouri's swim program their first NCAA championship. Meanwhile, Donahue began training at the South Florida Aquatic Club and was later accepted into the postgraduate swimming program at the University of Tennessee. Craig enrolled in the University of the Pacific, where he competed in their swimming program. In addition to current swimmers and divers, Zach Apple and Haley Black, two high-profile recruits who were planning to attend Western Kentucky prior to the scandal, instead enrolled at Auburn University.

Concerning the coaching staff, Marchionda became the head coach for the TAC Titans swimming team in North Carolina. Additionally, he continued to serve as a trainer for Donahue at the South Florida Aquatic Club. Thomas became the head coach for the swim team at St. Bonaventure University, while Ale was hired by Ohio University to serve as their head diving coach.

=== Legal proceedings ===
Following their investigation, the BGPD turned over the case to the Warren County Commonwealth Attorney's Office, officially closing it on April 14, 2015. The police department had closed their investigation with one male swimmer being charged on possession of cannabis and drug paraphernalia. At the time, detectives did not believe they would be pursuing any more criminal charges related to the case. The police stated that they did not expect to file charges related to possible crimes exposed in the pictures on the photo collages, partially due to an inability to ascertain the identities of those involved in the pictures. However, they stated that more charges could be pursued if new evidence were obtained. Following the department's closure of the case, Vanessa Cantley, an attorney representing Craig, expressed disappointment that the police had made no arrests under a 2008 harassment statute that addressed hazing.

In late April 2015, Brian Lowder, an attorney representing several former WKU swimmers who were accused of wrongdoing by Craig, stated that the sexual abuse allegations leveled against his clients had no standing and that Craig had been a more willing participant than he had disclosed in his statements to the police. Lowder said that text messages allegedly sent by Craig to other swim team members requesting their help in obtaining alcohol demonstrated that Craig "was ... engaging in the very activity that he criticizes throughout his attorney's report, wherein he is opposed to giving recruits alcohol". Cantley rejected Lowder's assertions, stating, "I can tell you without a doubt that Mr. Craig did not participate in these activities voluntarily. He was harassed. He was bullied. He was hazed. He was led to believe that the only way he could stay as part of the swim team at Western Kentucky University, was to suck it up and live through it."

==== Federal lawsuit against the university ====
In April 2015, Cantley stated that Craig was not interested in filing a lawsuit against Western Kentucky University at that time, but she hoped that the university would pay for Craig's tuition at another institution. However, on October 2, 2015, multiple news sources reported that Craig had filed a federal lawsuit in Bowling Green against the university, several athletic officials, and former teammates, over the alleged abuse. Specifically, the lawsuit named Stewart, Marchionda, Thomas, associate athletic directors Craig Biggs and John McCammon, and former teammates Tyler Gorneck, Harrison Griffin, and Seth Musser, as defendants.

In addition to the allegations made by Craig to the police in January 2015, the lawsuit also alleges that during a party on October 6, 2014, Craig was "choked to the point of passing out" by a teammate and further ordered to strip to his underwear and wear a horse mask. Craig said that a video of the event was circulated among other swim team members. Craig said he was also ordered by team members to vandalize a statue of former WKU president Henry Hardin Cherry and was threatened with a rifle by team members to prevent him from whistleblowing. Pertaining to the coaches, the lawsuit states that Marchionda "created a culture of silence and encouraged swim team members not to disclose wrongdoing", while the administrators were accused of not providing support for athletes per NCAA and university guidelines. In the suit, Craig was seeking $75,000 (equivalent to $102,000 in 2025) in compensatory damages, plus an undisclosed amount in punitive damages. The university replied to the lawsuit with a statement that read, in part:

WKU completed a thorough investigation into this matter and will be defending the lawsuit filed by Mr. Craig. Given the fact this matter is in litigation, we do not feel as though we can make any further comment at this time and all other questions should be directed to our attorney, Thomas N. Kerrick.

On January 1, 2016, SwimSwam reported that the university had filed a motion requesting a judge to dismiss the case, arguing that the university could not be held responsible for events that occurred off of its campus. On August 4, Craig and the university agreed to a settlement to resolve the litigation. As part of the settlement, the university agreed to pay Craig $50,000 ($67,000 in 2025), in addition to a $25,000 ($34,000 in 2025) payment by the university's insurance carrier. In exchange, Craig agreed to cease from saying anything negative about the university, while the university continues to deny any wrongdoing on their part. Kerrick, the attorney representing the university in the case, called the settlement "an economic resolution of a doubted and disputed claim". Cantley stated, "The case in full has been resolved and everybody is moving on. We're happy with the way the university handled the investigation and felt like they did what they needed to do on that end."

=== Possible reinstatement ===
At the time that WKU announced the suspension of the swimming program, a journalist for Bleacher Report noted, "No one from the university commented about the availability of swimming and diving at WKU" following the end of the five-year period, and SwimSwam reported that the suspension could be a prelude to the full disbandment of the program. In June 2015, Stewart stated that the university did not plan to completely disband the program and had set aside funds to be used at the end of the five-year period for reviving the program. At the time, the swimming team had an average allotted budget of about $1.03 million ($1.4 million in 2025), which Stewart said had shrunk to about $780,000 ($1.06 million in 2025) due to the loss of subsidies from the National Collegiate Athletic Association caused by the suspension. In October 2017, a spokesperson for WKU stated that the university "will evaluate the return of the swimming and diving program closer to the expiration of the five-year suspension".

In June 2018, due to university-wide budget cuts to its athletic programs, all funds allocated towards the swimming and diving program were cut, making the likelihood of the team returning in 2020 uncertain. According to the university, approximately $1 million ($1.28 million in 2025) in funding would need to be secured in order for the program to be revived. In April 2024, nearly a decade after the initial suspension had begun, students at WKU had initiated a grassroots effort to revive the program, which they acknowledged could take years to accomplish.

=== Hazing issues at other college swimming programs ===
The scandal at WKU occurred within a few years of several other notable hazing scandals at different universities in the United States, including at the University of Virginia in 2014 and both Dartmouth College and East Carolina University in 2017. In the late 2010s, SwimSwam published several opinion pieces addressing the issue, saying that the problem was "almost reaching epidemic levels in the sport of swimming over the past few years".

== See also ==
- Death penalty (NCAA)
- List of college swimming and diving teams
- List of sporting scandals
- Swimming in the United States
