= Stadium College Sports =

Sports cable network

- Country: United States
- Broadcast area: Nationwide

Programming
- Language(s): English
- Picture format: 720p (HDTV) (HD feeds downgraded to letterboxed 480i for SDTV)

Ownership
- Owner: Sinclair Broadcast Group; Allen Media Group
- Parent: Diamond Sports Group
- Key people: David Nathanson, David Rone
- Sister channels: Tennis Channel; Bally Sports; Stadium

History
- Launched: June 2001; 23 years ago
- Closed: December 31, 2023
- Former names: Fox Sports Digital Networks (2001–2004); Fox College Sports (2004–2021)

Stadium College Sports (formerly Fox College Sports) was a group of three American sports networks. Owned by Sinclair Broadcast Group and Allen Media Group (under the joint venture Diamond Sports Group), the three channels aired college and high school sporting events and programming. The channels were divided into three feeds—Atlantic, Central, and Pacific. Programming was drawn from the Bally Sports regional sports networks and Stadium. The channels were shut down on December 31, 2023.

== History ==
Fox College Sports logo

The three networks were originally launched in June 2001 as Fox Sports Digital Networks as a complement to Fox Sports Net for digital cable subscribers, since they did not have access to out-of-market regional sports networks that were available on satellite. The networks were managed by FOX Sports executive, David Nathanson, from 2001 to 2005 and David Rone from 2005 to 2007. The majority of the programming presented on the networks originated from the various Fox Sports regional networks and affiliates. The networks focused on college sports, but also had out-of-market baseball games (which would be phased out after the first few years). In 2004, the networks were relaunched as Fox College Sports to emphasize their college sports programming.

On June 18, 2021, more than a year after the networks sold to Sinclair after having been sold to Disney as part of the 21st Century Fox purchase, and the rebranding of the FSN networks as Bally Sports in late March of that year, the channels were quietly rebranded as Stadium College Sports, taking their name from Sinclair and Silver Chalice's national sports channel Stadium. In August 2021, Verizon Fios became the first major provider to provide the networks in high definition.

On December 31, 2021, YouTube TV announced that the three channels would be removed from their Sports Plus tier on January 1, 2022. Coverage of ACC sports was lost with the move of those rights to The CW. With Sinclair's sale of their stake in Stadium in full to Silver Chalice and the Stadium network being replaced over-the-air with The Nest, Stadium College Sports was quietly and ultimately wound down on December 31, 2023.

== Programming ==
The channels are divided into three geographical areas, which are Stadium College Sports Atlantic (formerly FCS Atlantic), Stadium College Sports Central (formerly FCS Central), and Stadium College Sports Pacific (formerly FCS Pacific). In addition to the events, the network features weekly coach's shows for various universities, programs from the various conferences and schools that highlight their athletes, and the regional sports reports from Bally Sports and other regional sports channels not within the Bally Sports system. Also featured are high school basketball and football games, and some state championships for these sports.

Major events include:

- Football
- Basketball
- Baseball
- Wrestling
- Hockey
- Men's & women's soccer
- Women's volleyball
- Lacrosse
- Track and field
- Gymnastics
- Swimming and diving
- Tennis
- Paintball
- Softball

The three Stadium College Sports channels generally air simulcast and live games produced by the Bally Sports networks or by Stadium through the digital only WCC Network and Mountain West Network.

=== Former Programming ===
Previously, each network sourced its programming from the various Fox Sports Networks as follows:

- FCS Atlantic: Shows Atlantic Coast Conference, Big East Conference, East Coast Athletic Conference, Ivy League and Southeastern Conference content from Root Sports Pittsburgh, Fox Sports South, Fox Sports Carolinas, Fox Sports Tennessee, Fox Sports Southeast, Fox Sports Florida, Sun Sports, and MSG Plus.
- FCS Central: Shows Big 12 Conference and Mid-American Conference content from Fox Sports Detroit, Fox Sports Southwest, Fox Sports Oklahoma, Fox Sports North, Fox Sports Wisconsin, Fox Sports Midwest, Fox Sports Kansas City, Fox Sports Indiana, and Fox Sports Ohio
- FCS Pacific: Shows Big 12 Conference and Pac-12 Conference content from Fox Sports Arizona, Fox Sports West, Prime Ticket, Root Sports Rocky Mountain, Root Sports Utah, and Root Sports Northwest.
- Pac-12 Conference football and basketball
- FCS Final Score, a news program similar to FSN's former program Final Score, also aired on this network at the top of the hour; it has since been cancelled.
- The National Collegiate Bass Fishing Championship
- Exclusive Home to The Paradise Jam Tournament from the Virgin Islands
- The FCS Tailgate Tour
- The NSSA College Surfing Championships
- The South Padre Invitational
- FISU International Collegiate Olympic Games every 2 years - both Winter and Summer. FCS was the exclusive domestic television carrier for these events.
