= E. Daniel Cherry =

American military general (born 1939)

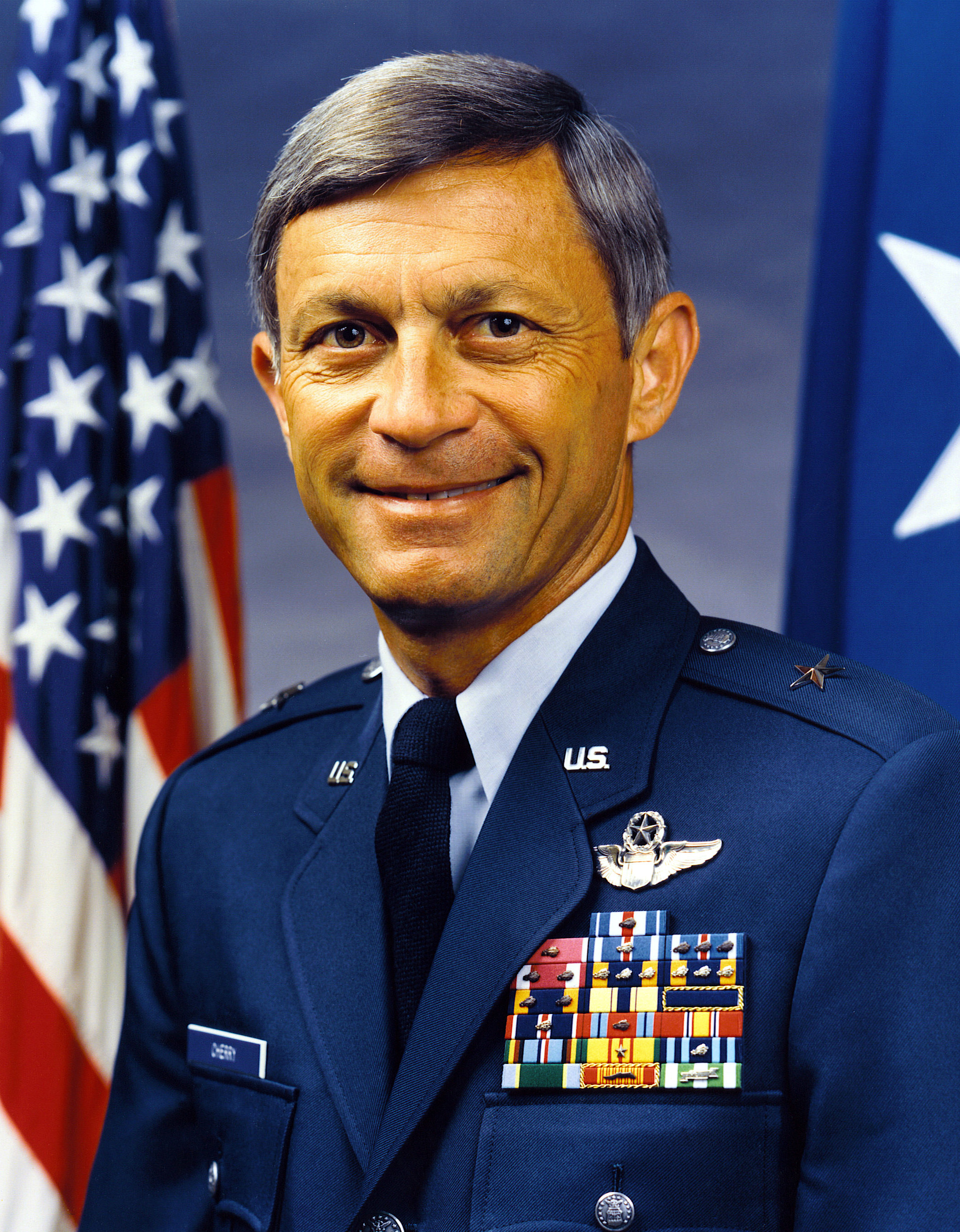
- Born: March 4, 1939 (age 87); Youngstown, Ohio, U.S.
- Relatives: Henry Hardin Cherry (grandfather)
- Military career
- Allegiance: United States of America
- Branch: United States Air Force
- Service years: 1959–1988
- Rank: Brigadier general
- Nickname: Dan
- Units: 421st Tactical Fighter Squadron; 44th Tactical Fighter Squadron; 13th Tactical Fighter Squadron
- Commands: United States Air Force Thunderbirds; 347th Combat Support Group; 347th Tactical Fighter Wing; 8th Tactical Fighter Wing; Air Force Recruiting Service
- Conflicts: Vietnam War
- Awards: Air Force Distinguished Service Medal; Silver Star (2); Legion of Merit (2); Distinguished Flying Cross (10); Meritorious Service Medal (3); Air Medal (35)

Edward Daniel Cherry (born March 4, 1939) is an American retired military officer who served as a brigadier general and a career fighter pilot in the United States Air Force. Cherry flew a combined total of 285 combat missions in F-105 Thunderchiefs and F-4 Phantoms during the Vietnam War, and was credited with destroying 1 enemy aircraft in aerial combat.

He retired in 1988, after 29 years of distinguished service.

== Early life ==
Edward Daniel Cherry was born in Youngstown, Ohio, on March 4, 1939, and moved to Bowling Green, Kentucky, when he was an infant. He graduated from South Cobb High School in Austell, Georgia, in 1957.

== Military career ==
Cherry entered the Air Force in July 1959 as an aviation cadet and was commissioned as a second lieutenant in July 1960. He served as a EC-121 navigator with the 522nd Airborne Early Warning and Control Wing at McClellan Air Force Base in California and McCoy Air Force Base in Florida, from February 1961 to March 1964. He then entered pilot training with the 3615th Pilot Training Wing at Craig Air Force Base in Alabama and graduated first in his class in March 1965.

He received training in F-105 Thunderchiefs at Nellis Air Force Base in Nevada and was assigned to the 8th Tactical Fighter Squadron in Spangdahlem Air Base, West Germany, where he flew F-105s from October 1965 to January 1967.

=== Vietnam war ===
In February 1967, Cherry was transferred to Korat Royal Thai Air Force Base, Thailand, where he served as an F-105 pilot with the 421st and 44th Tactical Fighter squadrons, and flew 100 combat missions over North Vietnam. In August 1967, he returned to the United States, and became an F-105 instructor pilot and flight examiner with the 23rd Tactical Fighter Wing at McConnell Air Force Base in Kansas. In 1968, he received a Bachelor of Science degree in mathematics from Florida Southern College.

In June 1971, he returned to Thailand, where he served as an F-4D Phantom pilot with the 13th Tactical Fighter Squadron at Udorn Royal Thai Air Force Base, and flew 185 combat missions. During this tour of duty, Cherry served as flight commander and chief of the 432nd Tactical Fighter Wing "Laredo" F-4 forward air controller program. On April 15, 1972, during an air patrol over Hanoi, Cherry shot down a North Vietnamese Air Force MiG-21, and the pilot ejected and parachuted to the ground. The mission is featured in the fifth episode of the first season of the History Channel series Dogfights, titled "Hell Over Hanoi", which recreated historical air combat campaigns using modern computer graphics.

=== Post war ===
In June 1972, Cherry was assigned as operations officer with both the 71st and 94th Tactical Fighter squadrons at MacDill Air Force Base in Florida. From January 1975 to August 1976, he served as chief of the Air Force operations briefing team at Headquarters U.S. Air Force in the Pentagon in Washington, D.C. He then served as commander and leader of the Air Force air demonstration squadron, the Thunderbirds, at Nellis Air Force Base. In April 1979, he became deputy commander of the 57th Combat Support Group at Nellis.

After graduating from the National War College in June 1980 and from University of Southern California with Master of Science degree in systems management also in the same year, he served as commander of the 347th Combat Support Group at Moody Air Force Base in Georgia and in July 1981, he was assigned as vice commander of the 347th Tactical Fighter Wing at Moody. In November 1982, he transferred to Headquarters of Pacific Air Forces in Hickam Air Force Base in Hawaii, as director of inspection and in July 1983, he became the inspector general of the Pacific Air Forces. Cherry served as commander of the 8th Tactical Fighter Wing, which was equipped with the F-16 Fighting Falcon, at Kunsan Air Base in South Korea, from May 1984 to June 1985, when he returned to Pacific Air Forces headquarters as deputy chief of staff for plans. He was promoted to brigadier general on October 1, 1985.

In August 1987, Cherry was appointed as commander of the Air Force Recruiting Service, and deputy chief of staff for recruiting service and commissioning programs at Headquarters of Air Training Command at Randolph Air Force Base in Texas, until his retirement from the Air Force on December 1, 1988. He is a command pilot with more than 4,000 flying hours.

== Later life ==
Cherry and wife Sylvia have two children and four grandchildren.

After his retirement from the Air Force, he moved to Bowling Green, Kentucky, where he worked as the secretary of the Kentucky Justice and Public Safety Cabinet within the State Government of Kentucky and as president of the Warren County Intermodal Transportation Authority. He was enshrined in the Kentucky Aviation Hall of Fame in 2000 and Georgia Aviation Hall of Fame in 2015. He was awarded the Western Kentucky University Hall of Distinguished Alumni on 2013.

The F-4D (66-7550), in which Cherry scored his MiG kill, is restored and currently on display at Aviation Heritage Park in Bowling Green, Kentucky.

In 2008, with the help of an attorney friend who had connections in Asia, Cherry sought to find the Vietnamese MiG-21 pilot whom he shot down on April 15, 1972. A Vietnamese TV program based in Ho Chi Minh City which specialized in reuniting long-separated friends or family called The Separation Never Seems to Have Existed (Vietnamese: Như chưa hề có cuộc chia ly) managed to find the pilot Nguyễn Hồng Mỹ, who was residing in Hanoi. On April 5, 2008, Cherry met with Nguyễn and shook hands with him on live TV. They quickly became friends, and Cherry and Nguyễn later traveled across the United States where they visited numerous airshows and landmarks, and took part in numerous speaking sessions where they recounted their experiences in aerial combat and their relationship. In 2009, Cherry published a book called My Enemy, My Friend: A Story of Reconciliation from the Vietnam War, which recounts his experiences in aerial combat and his subsequent friendship with Nguyễn.

He currently serves as the executive vice president of Aviation Heritage Park, and serves on the board of advisors of Western Kentucky University and its research foundation, and College Heights Foundation and Center for Information Technology.

== Awards and decorations ==
During his lengthy career, Cherry earned many decorations, including:

USAF Command Pilot badge
Air Force Distinguished Service Medal	Silver Star w/ 1 bronze oak leaf cluster	Legion of Merit w/ 1 bronze oak leaf cluster
Distinguished Flying Cross w/ 1 silver and 3 bronze oak leaf clusters	Distinguished Flying Cross (second ribbon required for accoutrement spacing)	Meritorious Service Medal w/ 2 bronze oak leaf clusters
Air Medal w/ 4 silver oak leaf clusters	Air Medal w/ 2 silver and 2 bronze oak leaf clusters (second ribbon required for accoutrement spacing)	Air Medal (third ribbon required for accoutrement spacing)
Air Force Commendation Medal	Air Force Presidential Unit Citation	Air Force Outstanding Unit Award w/ 1 bronze oak leaf cluster
Combat Readiness Medal w/ 1 bronze oak leaf cluster	National Defense Service Medal w/ 1 service star	Armed Forces Expeditionary Medal
Vietnam Service Medal w/ 1 silver campaign star	Korean Defense Service Medal	Air Force Longevity Service Award w/ 1 silver oak leaf cluster
Small Arms Expert Marksmanship Ribbon	Republic of Vietnam Gallantry Cross Unit Citation	Republic of Vietnam Campaign Medal
