= 8th Fighter Wing =

US Air Force unit

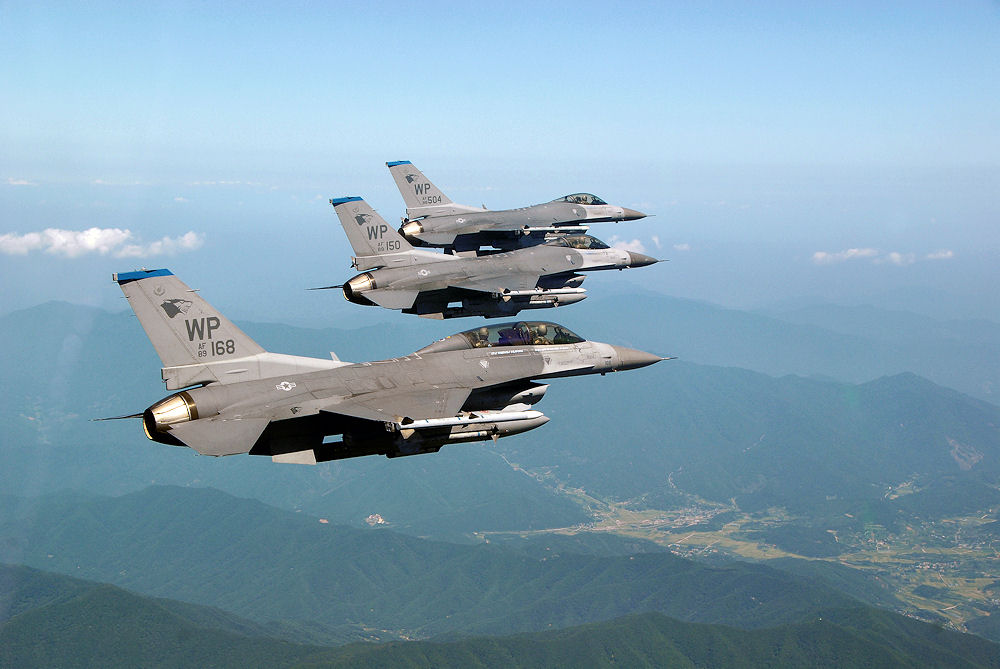
- 35th Fighter Squadron F-16DG Block 40F 89-2168 and CGs 89-2150 and 88-0504 in formation.
- Active: 1948–present
- Country: United States
- Branch: United States Air Force
- Role: Tactical Fighter
- Part of: Pacific Air Forces
- Garrison/HQ: Kunsan Air Base, Republic of Korea
- Nickname: Wolf Pack
- Engagements: Korean War(1950–1953) War in Vietnam (1965–1973)
- Decorations: Presidential Unit Citation; Air Force Outstanding Unit Award with Combat "V" Device; Air Force Outstanding Unit Award; Republic of Korea Presidential Unit Citation; Republic of Vietnam Gallantry Cross with Palm

Commanders
- Current commander: Colonel Kathryn K. Gaetke
- Vice Commander: Colonel Jason Monaco
- Command Chief: Chief Master Sergeant Nathan Chrestensen
- Notable commanders: William W. Momyer; Chesley G. Peterson; Robin Olds; Patrick Gamble; Mark Welsh; Gary North; Philip M. Breedlove; Burton Field; Robin Rand; Charles Q. Brown Jr. John L. Dolan; E. Daniel Cherry

Insignia
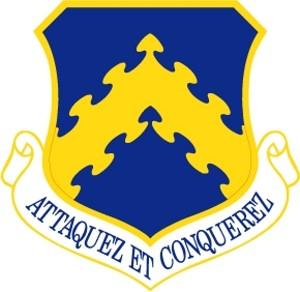
- 8th Fighter Wing emblem (approved 3 July 1952)
- Tail Code: WP

The 8th Fighter Wing is a fighter aircraft unit of the United States Air Force. It is the host unit at Kunsan Air Base, Republic of Korea and is assigned to Seventh Air Force. Seventh Air Force falls under Pacific Air Forces (PACAF). The Wing's 8th Operations Group is the successor of the 8th Pursuit Group, one of the 15 original combat air groups formed by the U.S. Army before World War II.

Established in Japan after World War II in 1948, the wing flew combat missions throughout the Korean War. Redesignated the 8th Tactical Fighter Wing in 1958, it remained in Japan until 1964. After a year in California, it moved to Southeast Asia, where its F-4 Phantom II crews earned the nicknames "MiG killers" and "bridge busters". In 1974 the wing relocated to Kunsan Air Base, South Korea, where it was redesignated the 8th Fighter Wing in 1992.

== History ==
For additional history and lineage, see 8th Operations Group

Established in August 1948 in Japan, the wing provided air defense to the islands. On 20 January 1951, the wing gained its new designation as the 8th Fighter Bomber Wing.

=== Korean War ===
On 25 June 1950, North Korea invaded South Korea, starting a war that would last three years. As the Korean War began, the 347th Fighter Group was assigned to the 8th to fly combat missions. The wing provided air cover for the evacuation of Americans from Korea on 26 June, the day after the invasion.

The wing had several additional squadrons attached to it during the first months of the war in addition to the 35th, 36th, and 80th Fighter Squadrons, these being:

- 9th Fighter Squadron (27 June – 9 July 1950) (F-80C)
- 68th Fighter Squadron, All Weather (1 March – 1 December 1950) (F-82E/G)
- No. 77 Squadron, Royal Australian Air Force (2 July – 10 October 1950; 25 June – 22 August 1951) (F-51D)
- 339th Fighter Squadron, All Weather (26 June – 5 July 1950) (F-82E/G)

Other units attached to the 8th in Korea were:

- 51st Fighter-Interceptor Wing (Attached September–October 1950) (F-80C)
- 452nd Bombardment Wing (Attached November 1950) (B-26)
- 49th Fighter-Bomber Group (Attached July–September 1950) (F-80C)

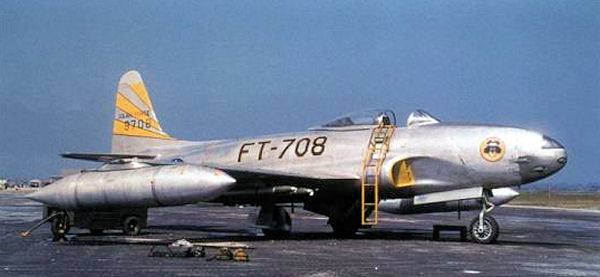
Lockheed F-80C-10-LO Shooting Star 49-8708 of the 8th Fighter-Bomber Group, Korea, 1950.

In these early operations, the wing flew the F-80 Shooting Star jet fighter and propeller driven aircraft such as the F-51 Mustang and F-82 Twin Mustang. The first aerial victory of the Korean War went to 1Lt William G. Hudson, of the 68th Fighter Squadron, All Weather in an F-82. Later the same day, 35th Fighter-Bomber Squadron F-80s scored the Air Force's first confirmed kills from jet aircraft. In August, the wing briefly reverted to the F-51 Mustang, returning to the F-80 in December 1950.

Throughout the war, the wing principally conducted air-to-ground operations, providing close air support to United Nations ground forces and attacking targets such as supply centers and transportation assets.

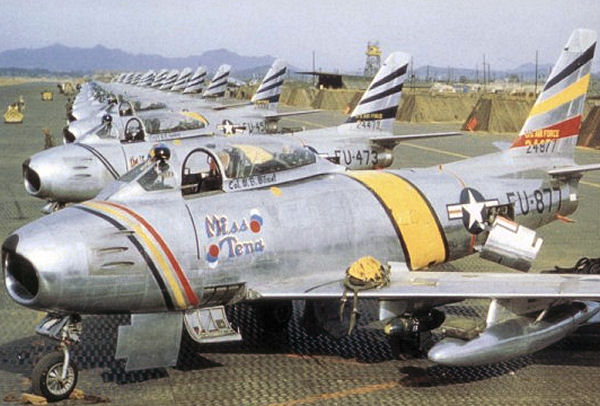
North American F-86F-30-NA Sabres of the 8th Fighter-Bomber Group, Korea, 1953. Serial 52-4877 in front in Wing Commander's colors, 52-4473 alongside.

The 8th Fighter Wing is known for the heroic actions of its members, including Major Charles J. Loring, a pilot in the 80th FS, who was posthumously awarded the Medal of Honor for his actions on 22 November 1952 when he flew his badly damaged F-80 aircraft into an enemy artillery emplacement near Sniper Ridge so that entrenched U.S. Infantry men could escape. During the next three years, the 8th flew more than 60,000 sorties while operating from bases in both Korea and Japan. The wing participated in 10 campaigns and earned three unit citations.

The wing finished the war flying the F-86 Sabre beginning in 1953 and became responsible for air defense over South Korea until relocated to Itazuke Air Base, Japan in October 1954. Its wartime participation in Korea earned the wing two Republic of Korea Presidential Unit Citations and ten campaign streamers, while the 8th Fighter-Bomber Group separately earned a Distinguished Unit Citation.

During the war in Korea, the 8th shot down 18 enemy aircraft, most in the earliest days of the war before the wing's mission changed to air-to-ground operations.

=== Cold War ===
With the end of the Korean War, the wing was assigned to Itazuke AB, Japan for the next ten years. On 1 October 1957, the 8th Fighter-Bomber Group inactivated, with the flying squadrons then assigned directly to the wing. Less than a year later, on 1 July 1958, the Air Force redesignated the wing as the 8th Tactical Fighter Wing. During its tenure at Itazuke, the wing flew several different aircraft, including the North American F-86 Sabre, North American F-100 Super Sabre, Convair F-102 Delta Dagger, and Republic F-105 Thunderchief.

As part of an overall effort to reduce the number of wings in Japan the wing's tactical squadrons were detached on 13 May 1964, and on 18 June 1964 all wing components except wing headquarters inactivated.

=== Vietnam War ===
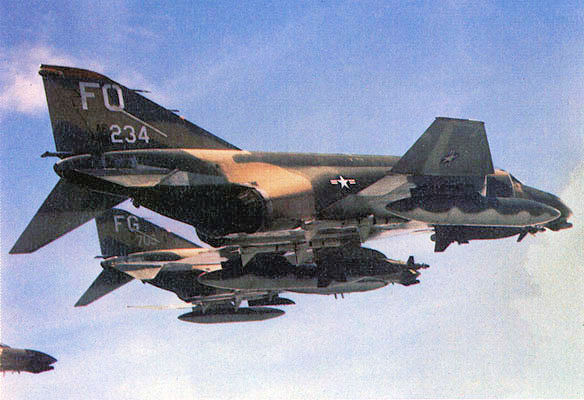
McDonnell F-4D-29-MC Phantom Serial Number 66-0234 of the 435th Tactical Fighter squadron with laser-guided bombs on a mission north.

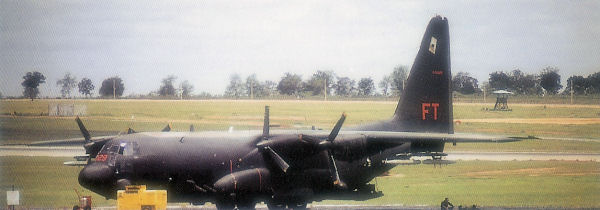
Lockheed C/AC-130A-LM Hercules Serial 55-0029 of the 16th Special Operations Squadron, May 1974.

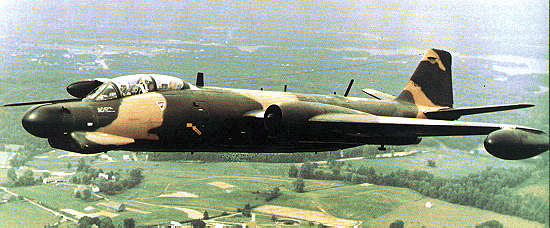
13th Bomb Squadron Martin B-57G from Ubon Royal Thai Air Force Base.

==== Off to war ====
On 18 June 1964, the wing moved without personnel or equipment to George AFB, California, replacing and absorbing the resources of the 32d Tactical Fighter Wing. Operational squadrons of the 8th TFW at George were:

- 68th Fighter-Interceptor Squadron
- 431st Fighter-Interceptor Squadron
- 497th Fighter-Interceptor Squadron

While at George AFB, the wing trained with the McDonnell Douglas F-4C Phantom II fighter aircraft and participated in numerous exercises, operational readiness inspections, and the like until the wing began to be moved to Ubon Royal Thai Air Force Base, Thailand in September 1965 to commence combat operations in the Vietnam War. The wing completed the move to Ubon in December 1965

At Ubon, the 8th TFW carried out its wartime mission as it led the way for other tactical Air Force fighter units during the Vietnam War. Initial F-4C operational squadrons were:

- 433d Tactical Fighter Squadron (December 1965 – July 1974) (Tail Code: FG)
- 497th Tactical Fighter Squadron (December 1965 – September 1974) (Tail Code: FP)
- Top cover for 8th TFW whilst at Ubon and over Thailand was provided by F-86 aircraft of 79 Squadron, Royal Australian Air Force.

Additional F-4C squadrons deployed and assigned to the 8th TFW were:

- 555th Tactical Fighter Squadron (February 1966 – June 1968) (Tail Code: FY/OY)
  (Reassigned from 51st Fighter Interceptor Wing, Naha AB, Okinawa)
  25th Tactical Fighter Squadron (May 1968 – July 1974) (Tail Code: FA)
  (Reassigned from 33d Tactical Fighter Wing, Eglin AFB, Florida)
- 476th Tactical Fighter Squadron (June 1966 – August 1974) (Tail Code: FU)
  (Reassigned from 479th Tactical Fighter Wing, George AFB, California)
- 435th Tactical Fighter Squadron (1966 - 1974) (Tail Code: FO)
  (Reassigned from 479th Tactical Fighter Wing, George AFB, California)

Note: The 555th TFS was reassigned to the 432nd Tactical Reconnaissance Wing at Udorn RTAFB where it would bring the unit up to strength. The 25th Tactical Fighter Squadron replaced the unit as the fourth F-4D fighter-bomber squadron at Ubon. (F-4D aircraft began arriving to Ubon approximately April 1967 to supplement aging F-4Cs.)

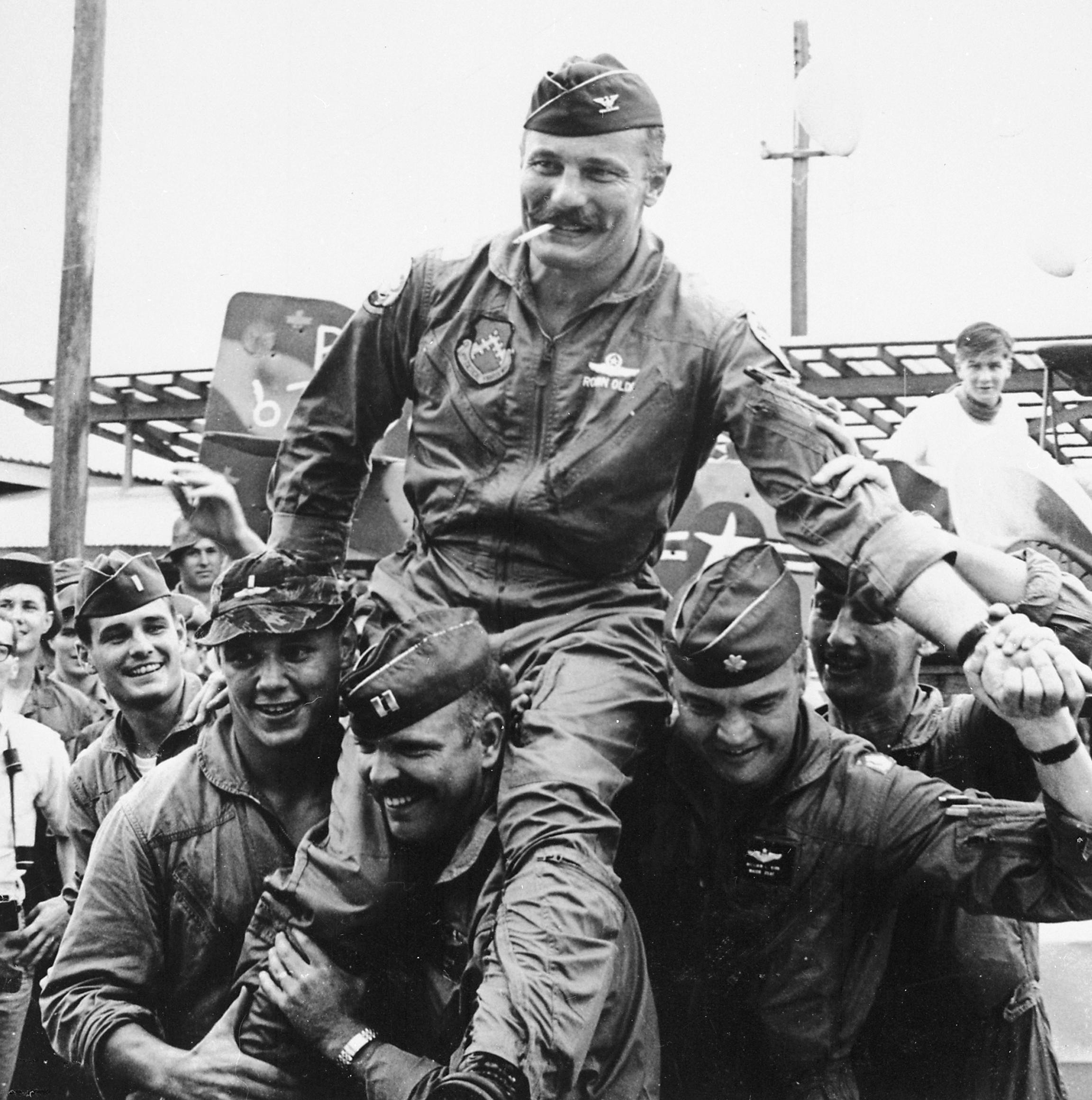
"Wolfpack" aviators of the 8th Tactical Fighter Wing carry their commanding officer, Colonel Robin Olds, following his return from his last combat mission over North Vietnam, on 23 September 1967.

The wing carried out a number of roles during combat. By the end of 1966, aircrews assigned to the 8th TFW flew nearly 14,000 combat missions into Vietnam. One of the squadrons assigned to wing, the 555th Tactical Fighter Squadron, became known as the "Ace" squadron of the conflict. During his tenure from September 1966 to September 1967, Col Robin Olds, Wing Commander, referred to his unit as the "Wolf Pack" because of pilot aggressiveness and teamwork while flying combat missions, much like a pack of wolves, which led to the wing's nickname. In May 1968, the wing was the first to use laser-guided bombs (LGBs) in combat.

==== Forward air control missions ====
In October 1968, the wing picked up a Fast FAC assignment, under the call sign "Wolf". Building on lessons learned by the earlier "Misty" and "Stormy" Fast FACs, five picked air crews were trained by the end of November. They drew their Phantom IIs from the wing's aircraft pool, and used up unflown Operation Commando Hunt sorties to justify their missions. By December 1968, the "Wolf" FACs were flying 3.5-hour missions in the Steel Tiger area of the Ho Chi Minh Trail. In the face of communist antiaircraft fire, a prudent FAC operated at 5,000 feet altitude and jinked his craft constantly to confuse gunners' aims. The "Wolf" FACs flew six sorties daily between 15 November 1968 and 15 April 1969. However, the dangerous and tiring visual reconnaissance missions were an important part of the interdiction campaign against the communist supply line.

In October 1969, 7th Air Force chose the 8th TFW for a night Fast FAC assignment flying interdiction against the Ho Chi Minh Trail. Flying under the call sign "Night Owl", the FACs dropped flares to illuminate air strikes against chokepoints along the Trail. They began operations on 18 October, and promptly lost two aircraft and crews when they collided with the ground while marking targets. Meanwhile, the antiaircraft threat to the FACs increased. In January 1970, 7th Air Force shut down the "Night Owl" FACs.

==== The Wing's assignment draws to an end ====
During 1970, the Wolf Pack flew its 100,000th combat sortie.

In addition to the F-4D fighter-bombers, the wing used Martin B-57G Canberras for night attacks, and AC-130 "Spectre" gunships for ground support and armed reconnaissance. Squadrons which operated these aircraft were:

- 16th Special Operations Squadron (October 1968 – July 1974) (AC-130A/E/H Tail Code: FT)
- 13th Bombardment Squadron (October 1970 – March 1972) (B-57G Tail Code: FS/FK)

After North Vietnam invaded the Republic of Vietnam in March 1972, the 8 TFW was augmented by additional Temporary Duty (TDY) F-4E units. These were:

- 334th Tactical Fighter Squadron
  (April 1972 – July 1972) (Tail Code: SA)
  (September 1972 – March 1973) (Tail Code: SJ) (TDY from 4th TFW, Seymour Johnson AFB, North Carolina)
- 335th Tactical Fighter Squadron
  (August 1972 – December 1972) (Tail Code: SJ) (TDY from 4th TFW, Seymour Johnson AFB, North Carolina)
- 308th Tactical Fighter Squadron
  (December 1972 – January 1973) (Tail Code: ZF) (TDY from 31st TFW, Homestead AFB, Florida)
- 58th Tactical Fighter Squadron
  (June 1973 – September 1973) (Tail Code: ED) (TDY from 33d TFW, Eglin AFB, Florida)

To make room for these forces, the 13th Bomb Squadron was reassigned to the 405th Fighter Wing at Clark AB, Philippines in December 1972.

In December 1972, the 8th became involved in Operation Linebacker II. Designed to make the enemy more serious about the peace negotiations in progress at Paris, France, the 8th TFW launched 524 sorties for bombing missions against North Vietnam between 18 and 31 December 1972. Early in 1973, the Wolf Pack mission included air interdiction into Laos against communist insurgents in Cambodia. All combat operations ended on 15 August 1973. In mid-1974 action began to phase down at Ubon Airfield, Thailand, and the wing began to lose personnel, aircraft, and units. The last scheduled F-4 training flight occurred on 16 July 1974.

- The 433d TFS was inactivated in July 1974.
- The 25th TFS was reassigned to the 18th TFW at Kadena Air Base, Okinawa in July 1974.
- The 16th SOS was reassigned to the 388th TFW at Korat RTAFB in July 1974.
- The 435th TFS was inactivated in August 1974.
- The 497th TFS was inactivated in September 1974.

With the exception of the 25th TFS's aircraft, the F-4D aircraft were flown back to the United States and reassigned to various Air National Guard units.

=== Back to Korea ===
The 8th TFW was transferred without personnel or equipment to Kunsan Air Base, South Korea on 16 September 1974, where the wing absorbed resources of the 3d Tactical Fighter Wing which had been reassigned without personnel or equipment to Clark AB, Philippines. For its efforts during the Vietnam War, the 8th TFW received four Presidential Unit Citations and five Air Force Outstanding Unit Awards. In addition, the wing led the Air Force with 38.5 MiG kills.

With the reassignment to Kunsan, the 8th TFW became responsible for air defense of South Korea. Operational F-4D squadrons of the wing were tail coded "WP" (for "Wolf Pack") and were as follows:

- 35th Tactical Fighter Squadron (Light Blue tail stripe)
- 80th Tactical Fighter Squadron (Yellow tail stripe)

In April 1975 the wing gained an air base squadron at Kwang Ju Air Base, often used during numerous tactical exercises. Following the killing of two U.S. Army officers by North Koreans on 18 August 1976, the 8th TFW went on increased alert and was quickly augmented by F-4Cs and F-4Ds from the 12th and 67th Squadrons at Kadena AB, Okinawa. The alert status relaxed on 8 September 1976 and the augmentation forces were released.

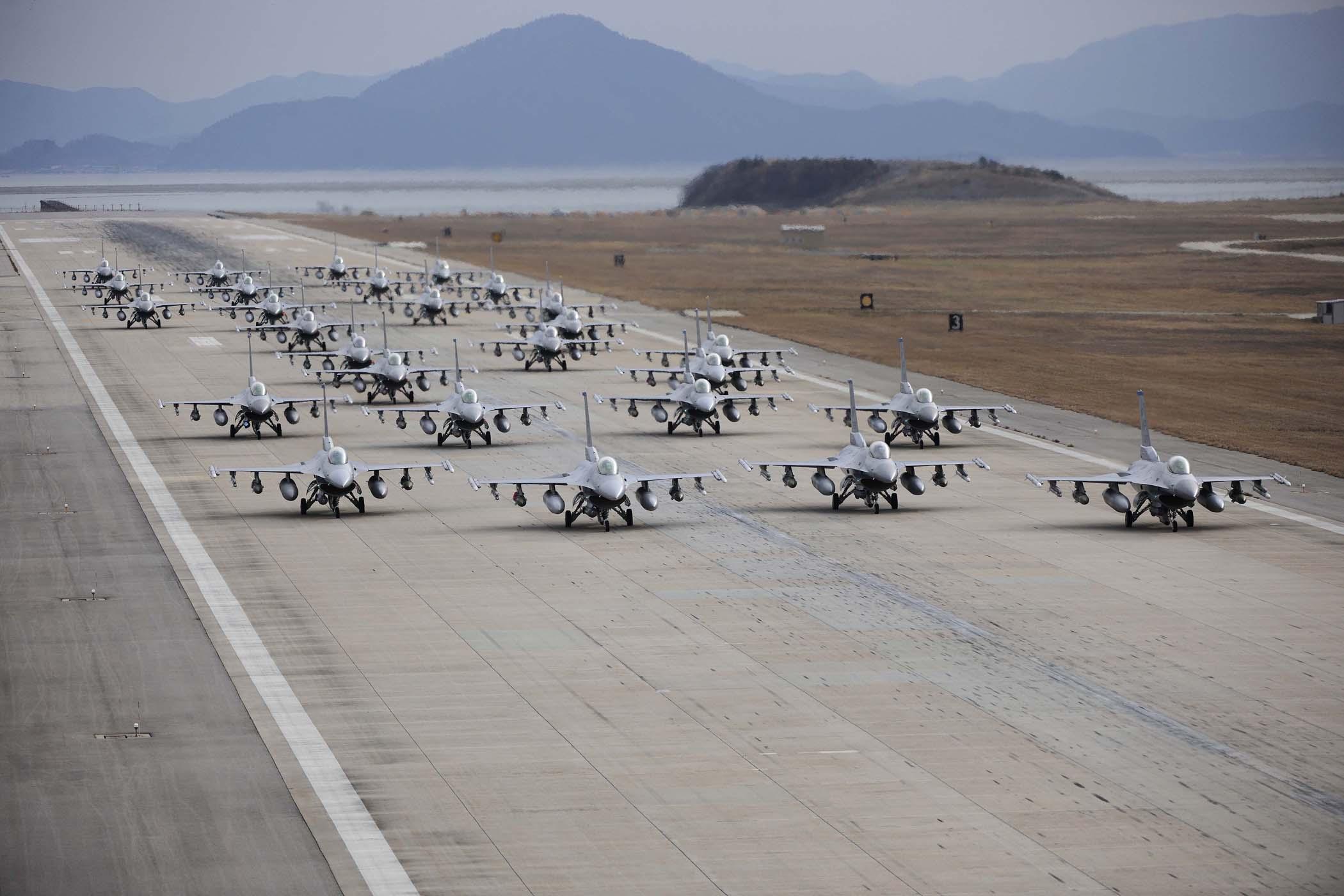
F-16's from the 8th and 419th Fighter Wings awaiting takeoff, in an elephant walk formation.

On 1 October 1978, the wing gained a third F-4D flying unit, the 497th Tactical Fighter Squadron, based at Taegu Air Base, South Korea. 497th TFS aircraft carried a red tail stipe. Operations continued unchanged for the next few years, until the wing transitioned from the F-4 to the newer F-16A Fighting Falcon in May 1981. The wing's first F-16 sortie was flown the following 18 September and, by 19 July 1982, the conversion of the 35th and 80th Fighter squadrons was complete as the last F-4 departed Kunsan. This aircraft conversion made the 8th the first active-duty overseas F-16 wing. On 1 January 1982, the 497th Tactical Fighter Squadron at Taegu inactivated. For the next ten years the wing used the F-16 to maintain combat readiness for the defense of Korea. In 1988 the F-16s were upgraded to the more capable F-16C/D models.

While the overall mission remained unchanged, the wing reorganized on 3 February 1992. The wing became the 8th Fighter Wing. Further, the wing adopted a new organizational structure. Under the former Tri-Deputy organization system, the wing commander had three deputy commanders, one each for operations, maintenance, and resources. As well, the squadrons were assigned directly to the wing.

=== Twenty-first century ===
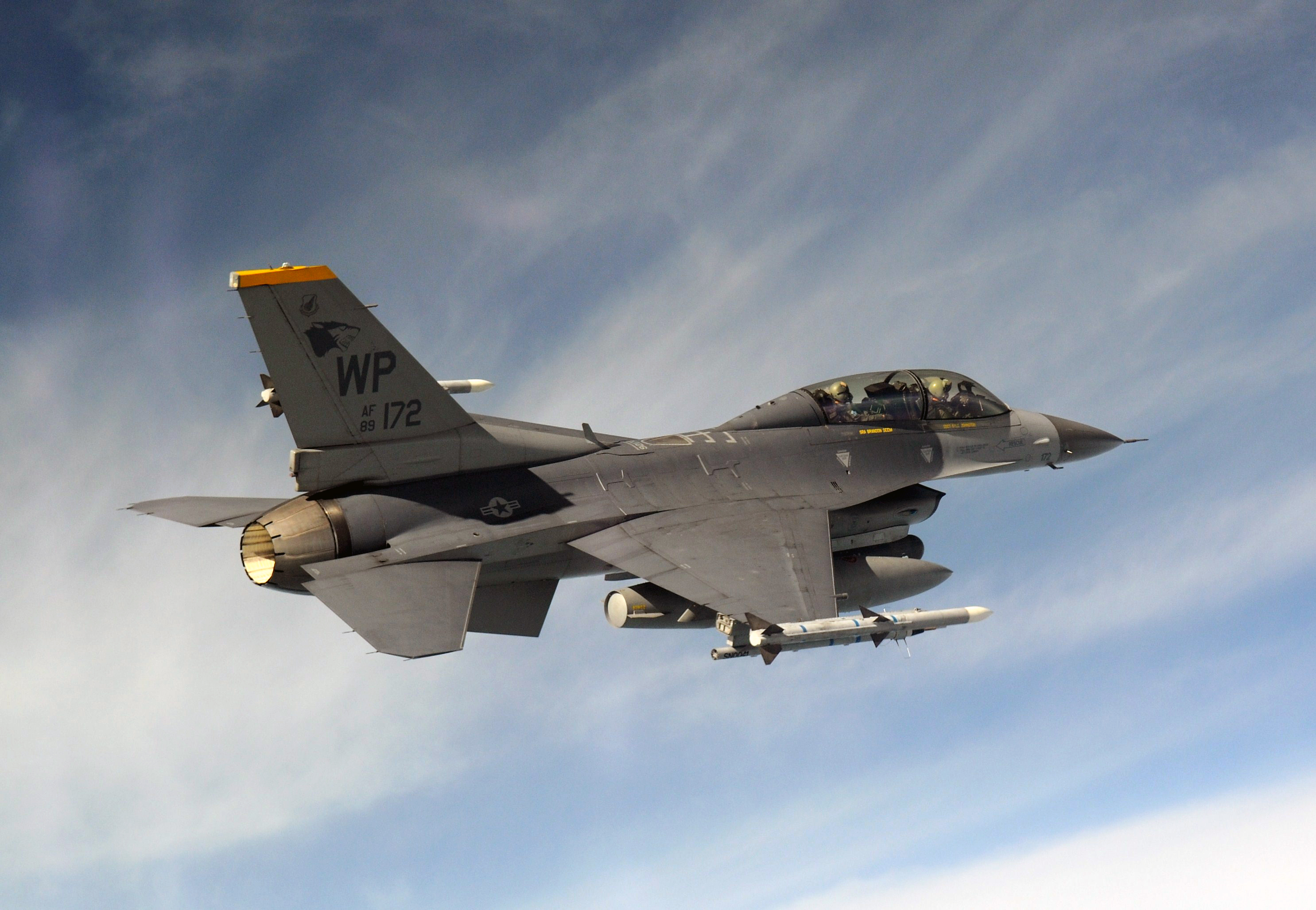
8th Fighter Wing Block 40 F-16D in training exercise.

The 8th Fighter Wing entered a new era in November 2000. On 17 November, the 35th Fighter Squadron received its first Block 40 F-16s. The new aircraft carried Low-Altitude Navigation & Targeting Infrared for Night (LANTIRN) pods. The 35th completed its conversion in February 2001. The combination of LANTIRN and night-vision goggles has allowed the Wolf Pack to take the fight into the night.

An inspection in November 2008 faulted the wing's adherence to technical orders and standards of documentation. As a result, on 10 November 2008 Colonel Bryan Bearden was removed as wing commander.

Today the 8th Fighter Wing is composed of four groups each with specific functions. The Operations Group controls all flying and airfield operations. The Maintenance Group performs Aircraft and Aircraft support equipment maintenance. The Mission Support Group has a wide range of responsibilities with a few of its functions being Security, Civil Engineering, Communications, Personnel Management, Logistics, Services and Contracting support. The Medical Group provides medical and dental care.

Wing Staff Agencies

- 8th Comptroller Squadron (8 CPTS)

8th Operations Group (8 OG) (Tail Code: WP)

- 8th Operations Support Squadron (8 OSS)
- 35th Fighter Squadron (35 FS) (F-16C/D, Blue tail stripe)
- 80th Fighter Squadron (80 FS) (F-16C/D, Gold tail stripe)

8th Maintenance Group (8 MXG)

- 35th Fighter Generation Squadron (35 FGS)
- 80th Fighter Generation Squadron (80 FGS)
- 8th Maintenance Squadron (8 MXS)

8th Mission Support Group (8 MSG)

- 8th Civil Engineer Squadron (8 CES)
- 8th Security Forces Squadron (8 SFS)
- 8th Force Support Squadron (8 FSS)
- 8th Logistics Readiness Squadron (8 LRS)
- 8th Communications Squadron (8 CS)

8th Medical Group (8 MDG)

- 8th Operational Medical Readiness Squadron (8 OMRS)
- 8th Healthcare Operations Squadron (8 HCOS)

== Lineage ==
- Established as the 8th Fighter Wing on 10 August 1948

Activated on 18 August 1948
Redesignated 8th Fighter-Bomber Wing on 20 January 1950
Redesignated 8th Tactical Fighter Wing on 1 July 1958
Redesignated 8th Fighter Wing on 3 February 1992

=== Assignments ===
- 315 Composite Wing, 18 August 1948
- Fifth Air Force, 1 March 1950
- 43d Air Division, 1 March 1955
- Fifth Air Force, 1 February 1957
- 41st Air Division, 10 November 1958
- Fifth Air Force, 1 June 1962
- Pacific Air Forces, 18 June 1964
- Tactical Air Command, 8 July 1964
- 831st Air Division, 10 July 1964
- Thirteenth Air Force, 8 December 1965

Attached to: 2d Air Division, 8 December 1965 – 31 March 1966
Attached to: Seventh Air Force, 1 April 1966 – 15 September 1974

- 314th Air Division, 16 September 1974
- Seventh Air Force, 8 September 1986 – present

=== Components ===
Wings

- 51st Fighter-Interceptor Wing: attached 25 September – 12 October 1950
- 452d Bombardment Wing: attached 15 – 30 November 1950

Groups

- 8th Fighter (later, Fighter-Bomber; Operations) Group: 18 August 1948 – 1 October 1957 (detached 14 August – 30 November 1950); 3 February 1992 – present
- 49th Fighter-Bomber Group: attached c. 9 July – 30 September 1950

Squadrons

- 4th Fighter-All Weather Squadron: attached 26 June – 13 July 1950
- 9th Fighter-Bomber Squadron: attached c. 27 June-c. 9 July 1950
- 13th Bombardment Squadron: attached 1–30 October 1970, assigned 31 October 1970 – 24 December 1972
- 16th Special Operations Squadron: 30 October 1968 – 8 December 1975 (detached 19 July 1974 – 8 December 1975).
- 25th Tactical Fighter Squadron 28 May 1968 – 5 July 1974
- 35th Tactical Fighter Squadron attached 1 February – 30 September 1957, assigned 1 October 1957 – 18 June 1964 (detached 13 May – 18 June 1964); assigned 16 September 1974 – 3 February 1992
- 36th Fighter-Bomber (later, Tactical Fighter) Squadron: attached 1 February – 30 September 1957, assigned 1 October 1957 – 18 June 1964 (detached 13 May – 18 June 1964); assigned 16–30 September 1974
- 58th Tactical Fighter Squadron: attached June-11 September 1973
- 68th Fighter-All Weather (later, Fighter Interceptor; Tactical Fighter) Squadron: attached 1 March – 1 December 1950, 20 October 1954 – 1 March 1955, and 1 December 1961 – 15 June 1964; assigned 25 July 1964 – 6 December 1965 (detached 24 August – 6 December 1965)
- 77th Squadron, Royal Australian Air Force: attached 2 July – 10 October 1950 and 25 June – 22 August 1951
- 80th Fighter-Bomber (later, Tactical Fighter) Squadron: attached 11 August – 1 October 1950 and 1 February – 30 September 1957, assigned 1 October 1957 – 18 June 1964 (detached 13 May – 18 June 1964); assigned 16 September 1974 – 3 February 1992
- 308th Tactical Fighter Squadron: attached December 1972 – June 1973
- 319th Fighter-Interceptor Squadron: attached 20 February – 17 August 1954
- 334th Tactical Fighter Squadron: attached 11 April – 8 July 1972 and 25 September 1972 – March 1973
- 335th Tactical Fighter Squadron: attached 8 July–December 1972
- 336th Tactical Fighter Squadron: attached 12 April – 25 September 1972 and March-7 September 1973
- 339th Fighter-All Weather Squadron: attached 26 June – 5 July 1950
- 431st Tactical Fighter Squadron: 25 July 1964 – 6 December 1965 (detached 26 August – 6 December 1965)
- 433d Tactical Fighter Squadron: 25 July 1964 – 23 July 1974
- 435th Tactical Fighter Squadron : attached 5 June – 23 July 1966, assigned 24 July 1966 – 8 August 1974
- 497th Tactical Fighter Squadron: 25 July 1964 – 6 December 1965; 8 December 1965 – 16 September 1974; 1 October 1978 – 1 January 1982
- 555th Tactical Fighter Squadron: attached c. 25 February – 24 March 1966, assigned 25 March 1966 – 1 June 1968

=== Stations ===
- Ashiya Air Base, Japan, 18 August 1948
- Itazuke Air Base, Japan, 25 March 1949
- Pyongyang Air Base (K-23), North Korea, 1 December 1950
- Seoul Air Base (K-16), South Korea, 9 December 1950
- Itazuke AB, Japan, 10 December 1950
- Kimpo Air Base (K-14), South Korea, 25 June 1951
- Suwon Air Base (K-13), South Korea, 23 August 1951
- Fukuoka Air Base, Japan, 20 October 1954 – 10 July 1964

Deployed at Kunsan Air Base, South Korea, 14–22 October 1955

- George Air Force Base, California, 10 July 1964 – c. 6 December 1965
- Ubon Air Base, Thailand, 8 December 1965 – 16 September 1974
- Kunsan Air Base, South Korea, 16 September 1974 – present

=== Aircraft ===
- Lockheed P-80 Shooting Star (1948–1953)
- North American F-86 Sabre (1953–1957)
- North American F-100 Super Sabre (1956–1963)
- Convair F-102 Delta Dagger (1961–1964)
- Republic F-105 Thunderchief (1963–1964)
- McDonnell F-4 Phantom II (1964–1982)
- Lockheed F-104 Starfighter (1966–1967)
- Lockheed AC-130 Spectre (1968–1974)
- Martin B-57 Canberra (1970–1972)
- General Dynamics F-16 Fighting Falcon (1981–present)
