= Henry Hardin Cherry =

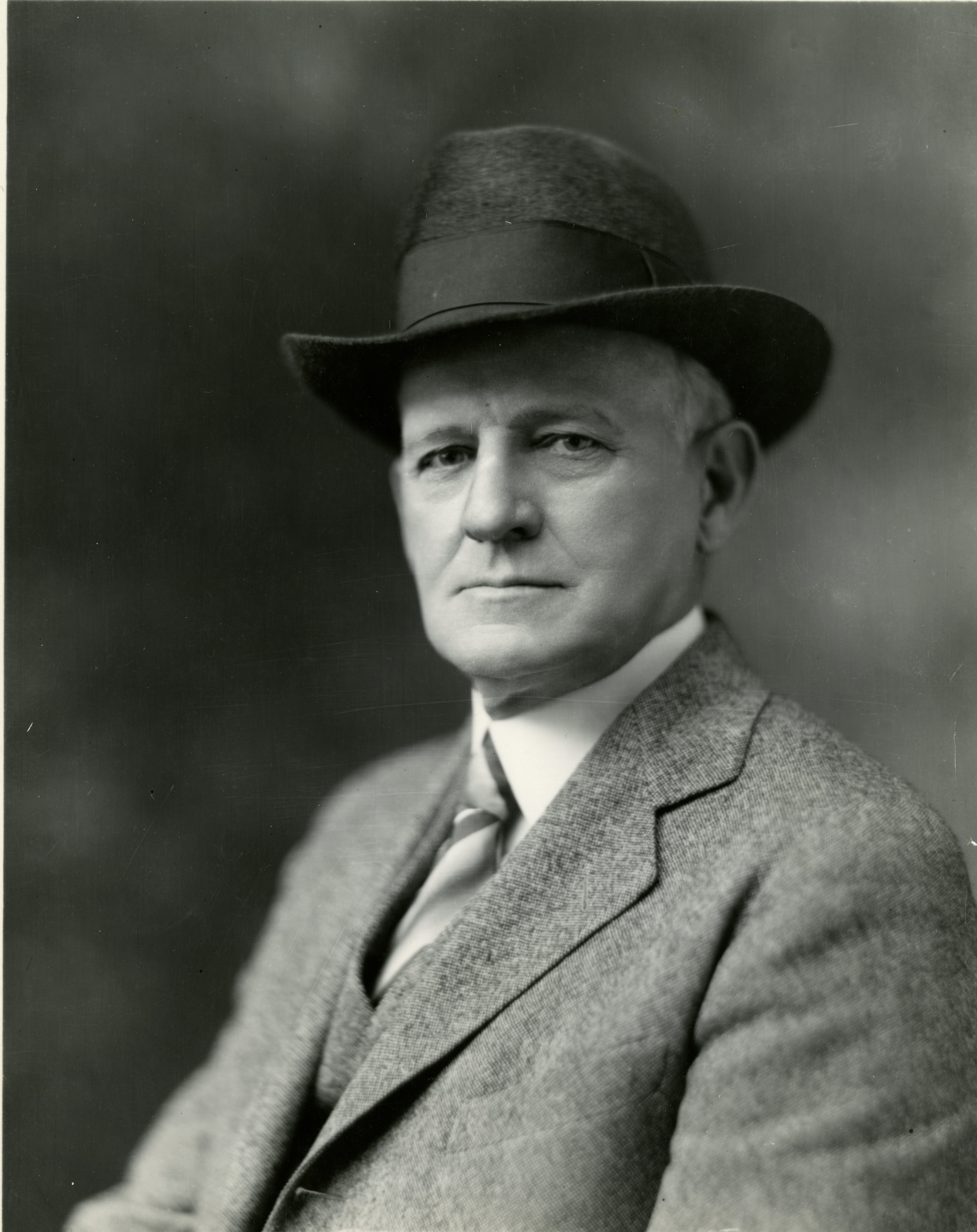
- Born: 16 November 1864; Bowling Green, Kentucky, United States
- Died: 1 August 1937 (aged 72); Bowling Green, Kentucky, United States
- Known for: Founder of Western Kentucky University
- Children: 3
- Relatives: E. Daniel Cherry (grandson)

Academic background
- Education: Southern Normal School

Academic work
- Discipline: Education

Henry Hardin Cherry (November 16, 1864 – August 1, 1937) was a leader in Kentucky higher education from the late nineteenth through early twentieth centuries. He was an active voice in the movement to establish normal schools in Kentucky and is best known as the founding president of Western Kentucky University. As a charismatic figure, he held a great amount of influence in Kentucky educational reform and politics, serving two times as the president of the Kentucky Education Association.

Henry Hardin Cherry Hall is a building named after Henry and is located on the campus of Western Kentucky University in Bowling Green, Kentucky.
