= Western Kentucky University =

Public university in Bowling Green, Kentucky, US

- Former names: Western Kentucky State Normal School (1906–1922); Western Kentucky State Normal School and Teachers College (1922–1930); Western Kentucky State Teachers College (1930–1948); Western Kentucky State College (1948–1966)
- Motto: The Spirit makes the Master; Life more life
- Type: Public university
- Established: 1906; 120 years ago
- Academic affiliations: ORAU; Space-grant
- Endowment: $305.65 million (2025)
- President: Timothy C. Caboni
- Faculty: 932 (658 full-time, fall 2020)
- Administrative staff: 1,691 (1,101 full-time, fall 2020)
- Students: 16,762 (fall 2024)
- Undergraduates: 14,593 (fall 2024)
- Postgraduates: 2,169 (fall 2024)
- Location: Bowling Green, Kentucky, United States; 36°59′1″N 86°27′27″W
- Campus: 200 acres (0.81 km^{2})
- Colors: Red and White
- Nickname: Hilltoppers and Lady Toppers
- Sporting affiliations: NCAA Division I FBS – CUSA
- Mascot: Big Red
- Website: wku.edu

Western Kentucky University (WKU) known as The Hill, is a public university in Bowling Green, Kentucky, United States. It was founded by the Commonwealth of Kentucky in 1906, though its roots reach back a few decades earlier. It operates regional campuses in Glasgow, Elizabethtown-Fort Knox, and Owensboro. The main campus sits atop a hill overlooking the Barren River valley.

== History ==
A statue of Dr. Henry Hardin Cherry, WKU's founder, stands at the top of The Hill, in front of Cherry Hall

The roots of Western Kentucky University go back to 1876 with the founding by A. W. Mell of the privately owned Glasgow Normal School and Business College in Glasgow, Kentucky. This moved to Bowling Green in 1884 and became the Southern Normal School and Business College. In 1890, Potter College was opened as a private women's college by Pleasant J. Potter. In 1906, Henry Hardin Cherry sold the Southern Normal School and became president of the Western Kentucky State Normal School, which had just been created by an act of the Kentucky General Assembly. Southern's student body and its building became the new school, with classes beginning on January 22, 1907. In 1909 Potter College closed and Western bought the buildings and property of the school. In 1911, Western relocated to its present site on the property that had been Potter College.

In 1922, the school was authorized by the state to grant four-year degrees and was renamed Western Kentucky State Normal School and Teachers College. The first four-year degrees were awarded in 1924. In 1927, the school merged with Ogden College, which occupied an adjacent campus. The name changed again in 1930 to Western Kentucky State Teachers College. The school was authorized to offer the Master of Arts degree in 1931. Another name change took place in 1948 when the school became simply Western Kentucky State College.

WKSC merged with the Bowling Green College of Commerce, which had formerly been the Bowling Green Business University, in 1963. Bowling Green Business University had originally been a part of the Southern Normal School and had been sold off by Henry Hardin Cherry when Southern Normal School was transferred to the state. The structure of the institution changed at this time, divided into separate colleges. Bowling Green College of Commerce maintained its identity in this way. The Graduate School also became a constituent college. In 1965, three additional colleges were created. In 1966, Western Kentucky State College became Western Kentucky University.

For many years, the college was popularly known as "Western", as indicated in its fight song, "Stand Up and Cheer". However, administrators in recent years have preferred to call it "WKU."

On July 1, 2017, Timothy C. Caboni became the university's 10th president.

=== Presidents ===
Western Kentucky University officially lists ten presidents since the formation of the Office of the President; Paul Cook served as interim president from 1985 to 1986.

No.	Name	Years served
1	Henry Hardin Cherry	1906–1937
2	Paul L. Garrett	1937–1955
3	Kelly Thompson	1955–1969
4	Dero Downing	1969–1979
5	John Minton	1979
6	Donald Zacharias	1979–1985
7	Kern Alexander	1986–1988
8	Thomas Meredith	1988–1997
9	Gary Ransdell	1997–2017
10	Timothy Caboni	2017–present

== Academics ==
Western Kentucky University houses five academic colleges, an honors college, and a graduate school.

- College of Education and Behavioral Sciences
- Ogden College of Science & Engineering
- Potter College of Arts & Letters
- Gordon Ford College of Business
- College of Health and Human Services
- Mahurin Honors College
- The Graduate School

=== Reputation and rankings ===
Academic rankings

National
- U.S. News & World Report: 363 (tie)
- Washington Monthly: 338

The Spirit Makes the Master, WKU's motto, is on the pylon at the entrance to the university.

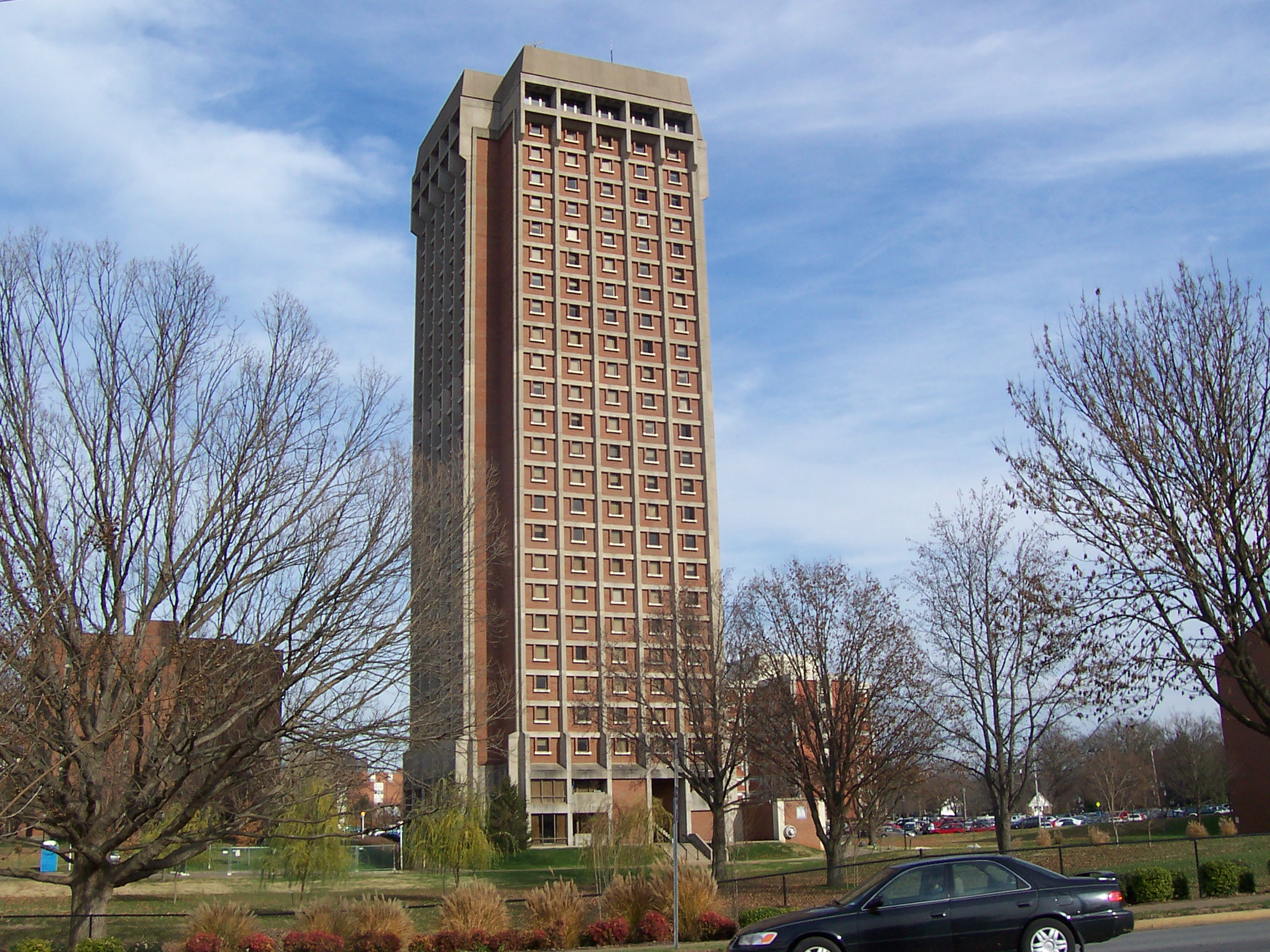
Pearce-Ford Tower, the largest dormitory at Western Kentucky University and the second largest in the United States

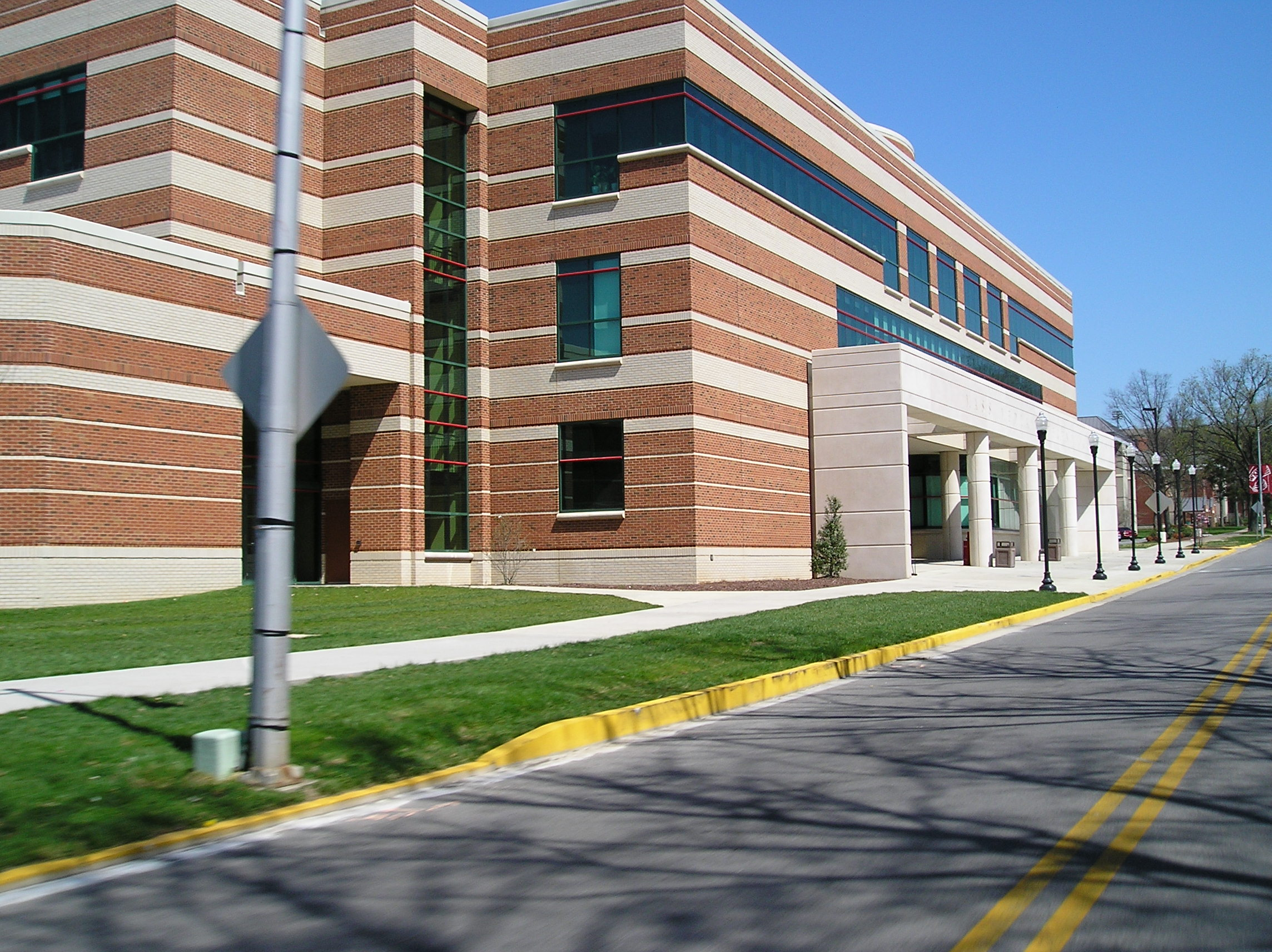
Jody Richards Hall, home to WKU's School of Journalism and Broadcasting

As of 2007, twenty-seven alumni of WKU's photo and print journalism programs have been awarded thirteen Pulitzer Prizes, including eleven alumni recognized for their coverage of the Carrollton bus crash. The school publishes a twice-weekly newspaper, the College Heights Herald.

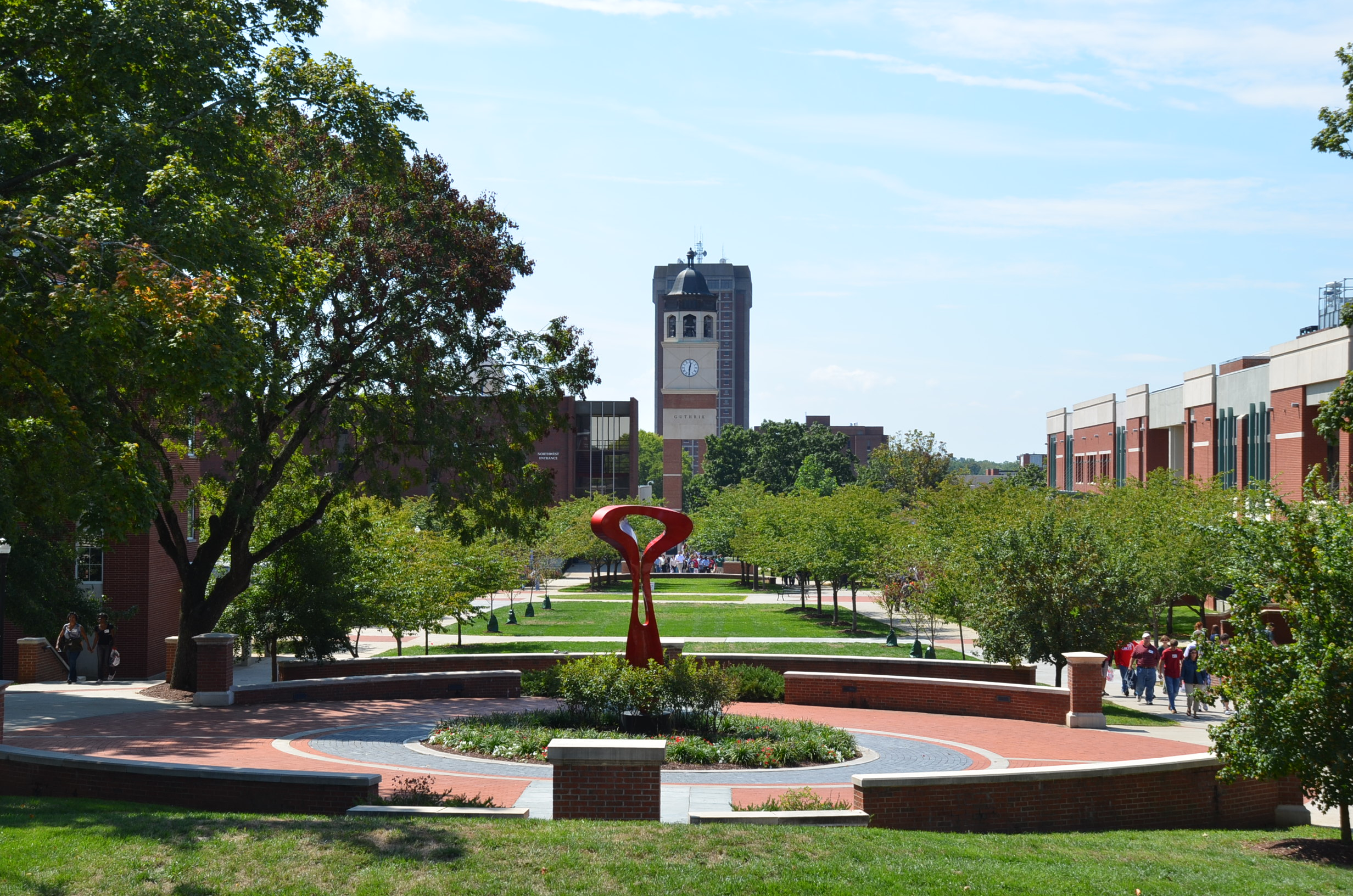
View from the middle of the campus

=== Mahurin Honors College ===
The WKU Honors College became the first Honors College in the Commonwealth of Kentucky on July 1, 2007. The Honors College serves over 1,300 active Honors students with the 2016 incoming freshman class ACT/SAT average ranking among the top 6% in the nation.

=== Center for Gifted Studies ===
WKU's Center for Gifted Studies conducts research and provides opportunities for gifted and talented students, educators, and parents.

=== The Carol Martin Gatton Academy of Mathematics and Science in Kentucky ===
The Carol Martin Gatton Academy of Mathematics and Science in Kentucky opened in the Fall of 2007. The project is based on the University of North Texas's Texas Academy of Mathematics and Science. The school accepts roughly 100 high school juniors each year. As incoming juniors, students can earn at least 60 college credit hours during their time at the school. The Gatton Academy was named "America's Best High School" by Newsweek in 2012 and 2013. The building, originally designed in 1929, was renovated and expanded by RossTarrant Architects to transform it into the Gatton Academy.

== Athletics ==
The Western Kentucky (WKU) athletic teams are called the Hilltoppers (men's) and Lady Toppers (women's). Their mascot is known as Big Red. The mascot has appeared in a series of ESPN promotions. The university is a member of the NCAA Division I ranks, primarily competing in the Conference USA (C-USA) since the 2014–15 academic year. The Hilltoppers and Lady Toppers previously competed in the Sun Belt Conference from 1982–83 to 2013–14; and in the Ohio Valley Conference (OVC) from 1948–49 to 1981–82.

WKU competes in 16 intercollegiate varsity sports: Men's sports include baseball, basketball, cross country, football, golf, and track & field; while women's sports include basketball, cross country, golf, soccer, softball, tennis, track & field, and volleyball.

=== Volleyball ===
Under coach Travis Hudson, WKU earned its 18th NCAA Tournament berth in 2025, including its seventh straight appearance and 11th in 12 seasons. The Hilltoppers have also won 21 of a possible 24 CUSA volleyball championships.

=== Swimming ===
The WKU swim team, before its suspension after the 2014–15 season, consistently placed in the top 5 in the Mid-Major National Rankings. In 2006 their men were undefeated in dual meets and were Sun Belt Conference Champions. The women won five consecutive championships from 2001 to 2005. In 2005, after 37 years as head coach, coach Bill Powell became an assistant coach, and holds the record for being the second-winningest coach in men's swimming in NCAA dual meet history.

Following the Western Kentucky University swim team hazing scandal in 2015, which revealed incidents of hazing dating back to at least 2012, the university placed the entire program on a five-year suspension. However, as of 2024, the program has not been revived.

=== Baseball ===
The baseball team has enjoyed some success, winning the Sun Belt Conference tournament championship in 2009. In April 2010, the WKU baseball team defeated the University of Kentucky 24–8 in a game at Bowling Green Ballpark. The crowd of 6,183 was the largest crowd to ever attend a WKU home baseball game. In 2025, WKU baseball celebrated "one of the best seasons in program history." The Hilltoppers finished with a 46–14 overall record, the second most wins in a season in program history. Their 46 wins finished one shy of the 1980 WKU Baseball team. WKU Baseball won the Conference-USA Championship, their first conference championship as a member of the CUSA. The team was also invited to the NCAA Tournament regionals, where they went 0–2 and their season ended with an 8–6 loss to Ole Miss.

=== Basketball ===
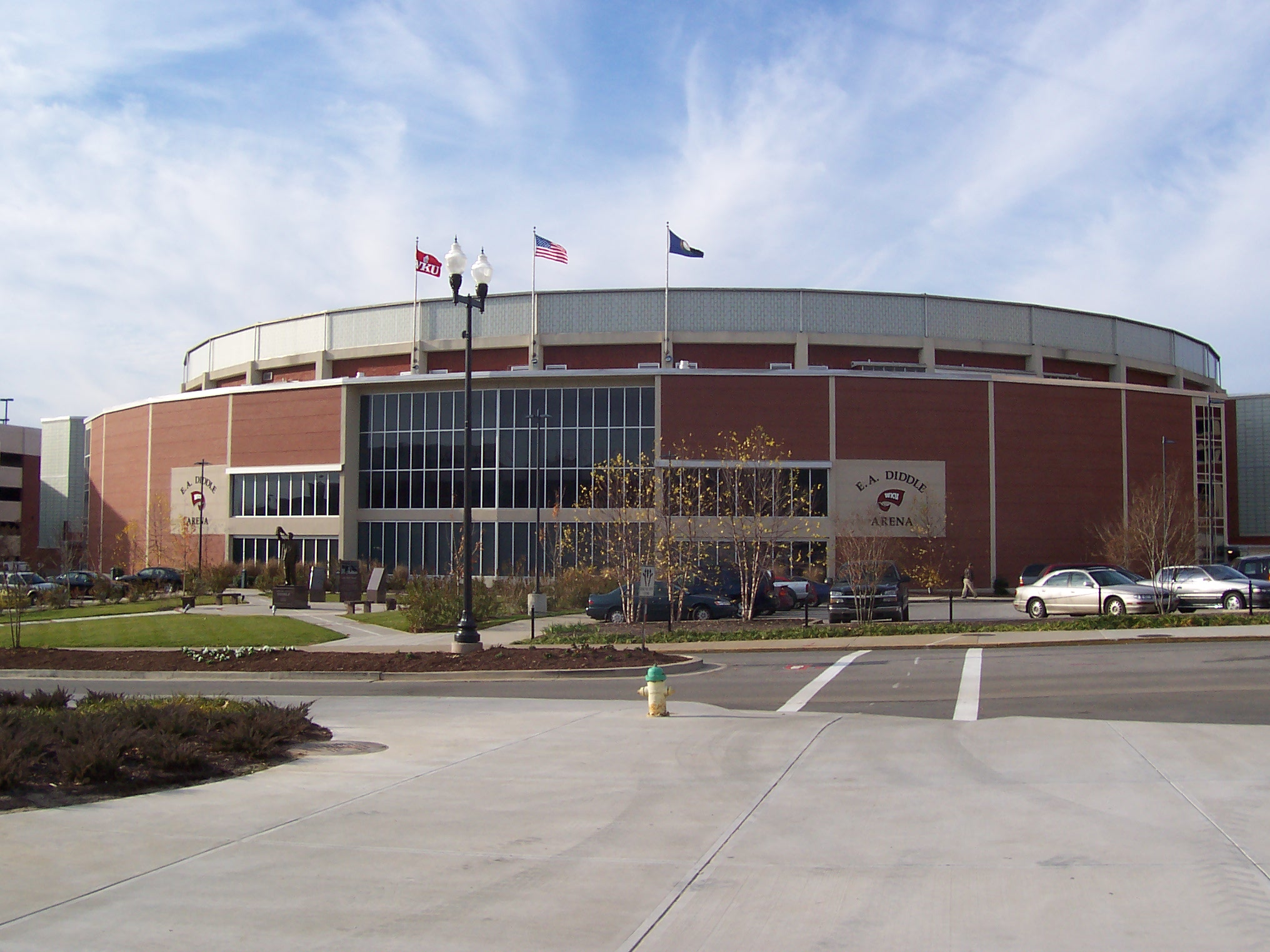
E.A. Diddle Arena, home to the Men's and Women's Basketball teams at WKU

The men's basketball program claims to have the 14th most victories in the history of the NCAA.

The men's basketball team defeated Middle Tennessee in the 2008 Sun Belt Conference tournament championship game to get a bid into the 2008 NCAA Tournament. The Hilltoppers won their first-round contest against Drake on a last-second three-pointer by Ty Rogers, and won their second-round game against San Diego, before losing to UCLA 88–78 in the Sweet 16. It was the Toppers' eighth all-time appearance in the Sweet 16 but their first since 1993. In 2009, the men's basketball team defeated Illinois in the first round of the NCAA Tournament 76–72 to advance to the second-round game against Gonzaga. The Toppers were beaten 83–81 on a last-second shot, failing to advance to their second straight Sweet 16. In the first round of the NCAA Tournament in 2012, the Toppers pulled off a stunning win against Mississippi Valley State, erasing a 16-point deficit with less than five minutes remaining, pulling off a 59–58 win as U.S. President Barack Obama and British Prime Minister David Cameron looked on.

=== Football ===
The Hilltopper football team belonged to what was then the Gateway Football Conference until 2006. In 2002, WKU won the NCAA Division I FCS (formerly I-AA) National Championship, under coach Jack Harbaugh. In 2006, the school's board of regents voted to move the team to the Division I Bowl Subdivision (formerly I-A). After two years of provisional status, they began to compete in 2009 as a member of the Sun Belt Conference. An extensive rivalry with Eastern Kentucky University, known as the Battle of the Bluegrass, ended in 2008 as WKU moved into FBS football. Starting with the 2014 season, WKU football has been a member of Conference USA, following cross-state rivals, Middle Tennessee State University, who joined C-USA a year prior.

== Campus ==
A defining characteristic of Western Kentucky University is its placement on top of a hill. This is a point of pride for many affiliated with the institution and its relative uniqueness is celebrated by members of the WKU community. "The Hill" is a common nickname for WKU's Bowling Green campus, especially in communication to prospective and current students. WKU's sports teams are also officially nicknamed the "Hilltoppers."

WKU's campus also features multiple buildings and sites included on the National Register of Historic Places. These include:

- Henry Hardin Cherry Hall
- Fort Lytle
- Helm Library
- The Industrial Education Annex
- Industrial Arts Building
- The Kentucky Building
- President's Home

== Greek organizations ==
Undergraduate demographics as of Fall 2023
Race and ethnicity	Total
White	75%
Black	9%
Hispanic	6%
Two or more races	4%
Asian	3%
Unknown	2%
International student	1%
Economic diversity
Low-income (Note: The percentage of students who received an income-based federal Pell grant intended for low-income students.)	34%
Affluent (Note: The percentage of students who are a part of the American middle class at the bare minimum.)	66%

In 1965 the Western Kentucky University Board of Regents allowed national fraternities and sororities to form local chapters. Currently, there are some 33 active organizations with approximately 1,500 active undergraduates.

== Media and publications ==
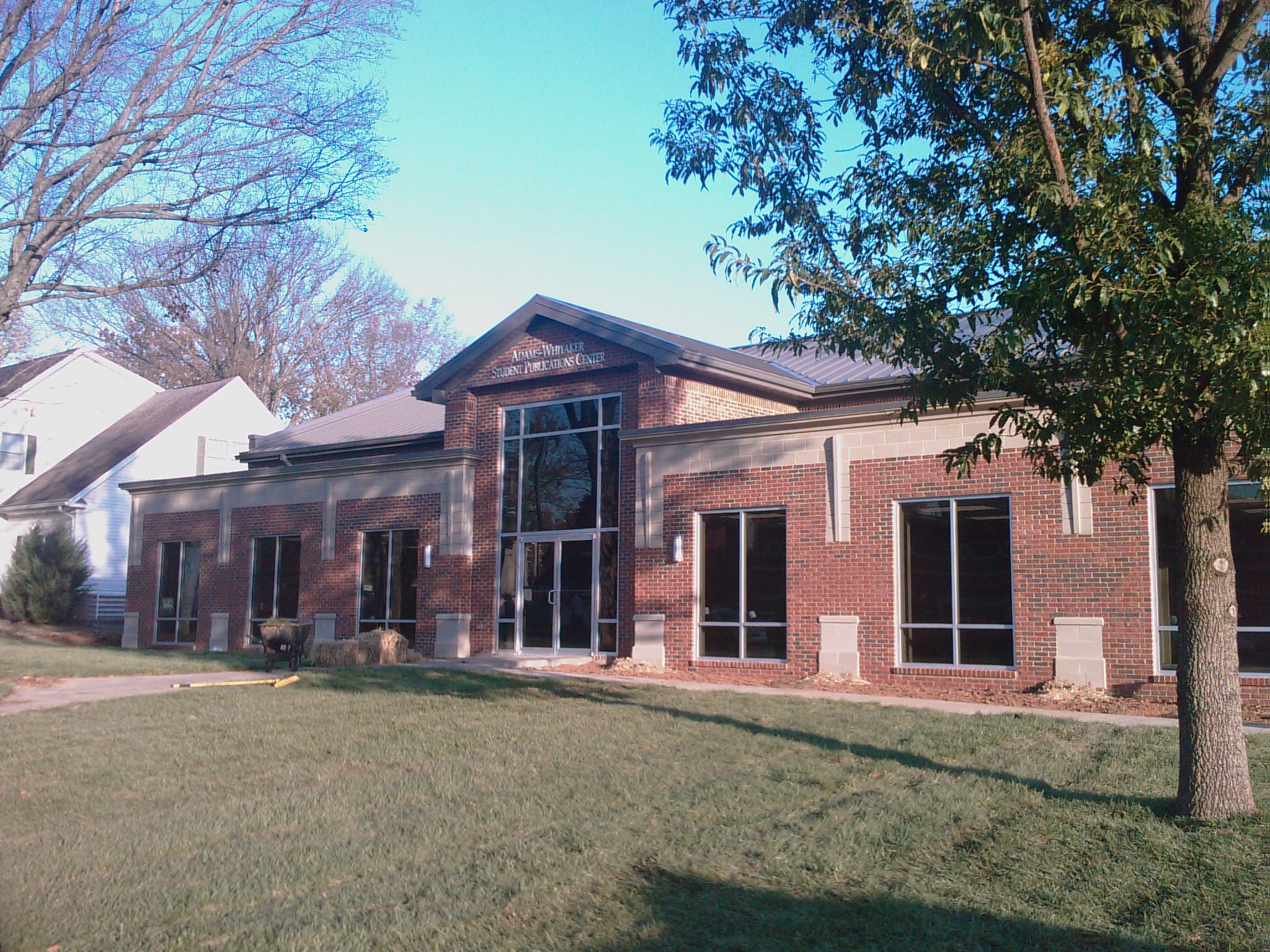
Adams-Whitaker Student Publications Center, home to the College Heights Herald, the Talisman and WKUHerald.com.

- College Heights Herald, WKU's student-run newspaper since 1924
- Talisman, WKU's yearbook
- Rise Over Run Magazine, WKU's online magazine for independent culture
- WKU SPIRIT, WKU's alumni magazine
- WWHR, Revolution 91.7 – WKU's college radio station
- WKU NewsChannel 12 – Student-run television newscast.
- The Extra Point – Student-run television sportscast.

== Bibliography ==
- Ellis, William E. (2011). A History of Education in Kentucky. Lexington, Kentucky: University Press of Kentucky. ISBN 978-0-8131-4023-0.
