= Henry Hardin Cherry Hall =

- Cherry Hall
- U.S. National Register of Historic Places
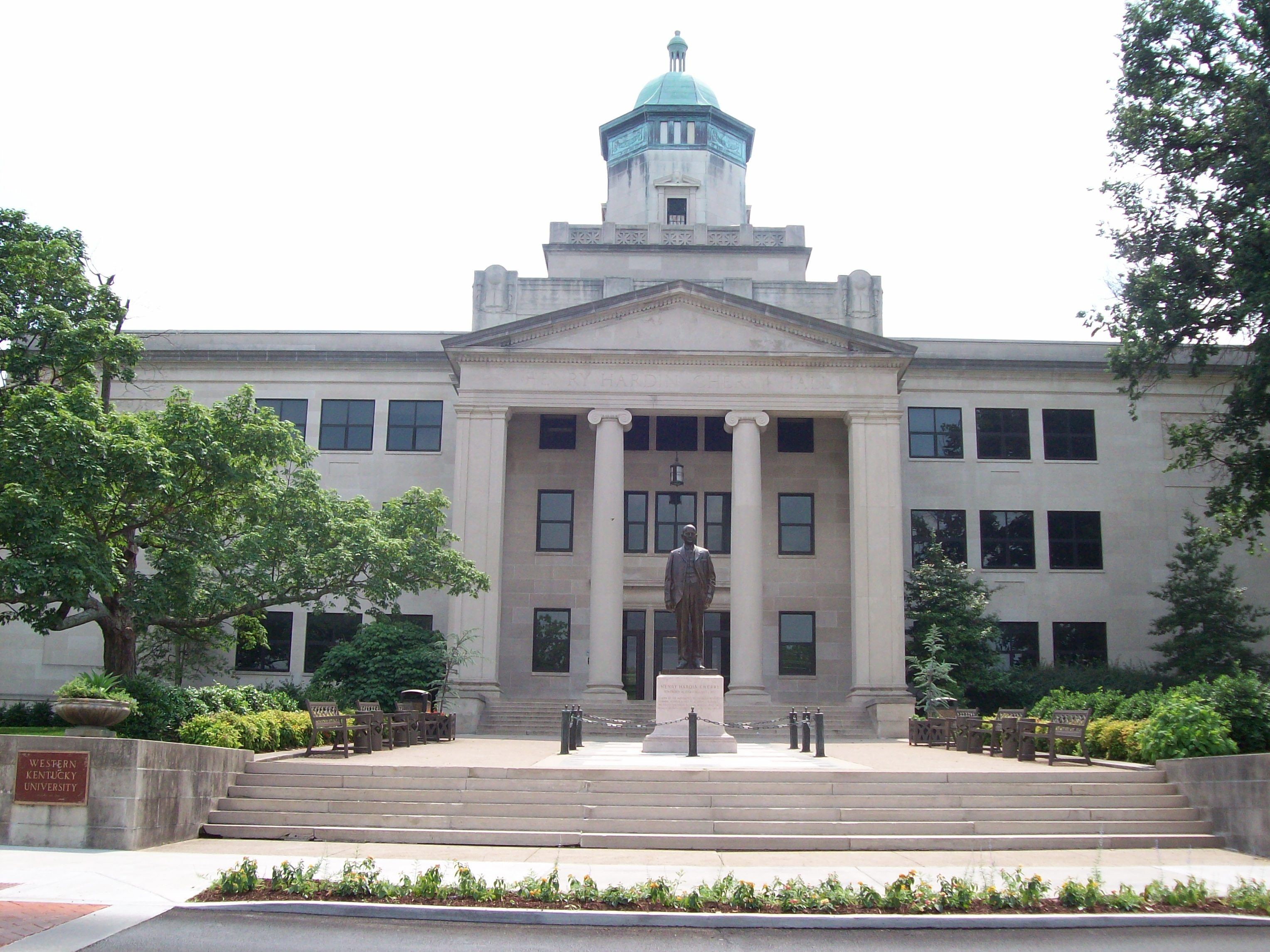
- Front view of Cherry Hall, facing College Street.
- Location: Bowling Green, Kentucky
- Coordinates: 36.98748°N 86.45115°W
- Built: 1937
- Architect: Brinton B. Davis, George H. Rommell Company
- Architectural style: Classical
- MPS: Warren County MRA
- NRHP reference No.: 79003496
- Added to NRHP: December 18, 1979

Henry Hardin Cherry Hall is a building located on the campus of Western Kentucky University in Bowling Green, Kentucky. Built with funds appropriated under the New Deal, the building was completed in 1937. It is named for Henry Hardin Cherry, who founded the Bowling Green Normal School, the forerunner of the modern university. It was added to the National Register of Historic Places in 1979.

== History ==
The idea for the construction of Henry Hardin Cherry Hall (or Cherry Hall for short) was formulated by Louisville architect Brinton B. Davis. Nicknamed "the hill builder," Davis had designed a majority of the buildings at what became Western Kentucky University prior to that time. His plan was to use funds appropriated through the Public Works Administration to make improvements to the campus and expand classroom space.

The crown jewel of the university, Cherry Hall was completed in 1937. Located at the intersection of College and 15th Streets, the building contained space for fifty classrooms, sixteen laboratories and sixty offices. At the time of its construction, Cherry also housed the campus bookstore and post office. The building contains three floors, as well as a basement which provides extra office and classroom space.

The hall was named after Dr. Cherry, who died shortly after the completion of the building.

== Modern usage ==
As the university expanded over the years, the usage of Cherry Hall was modified. Over time, the post office and bookstore moved to different buildings on campus, while the construction of the Kelly Thompson Complex for Science facilitated the removal of the laboratory space from Cherry Hall. The former laboratories were subsequently converted into more classroom space.

Cherry Hall currently serves as the locations of the Departments of English, history, religion, philosophy and University Experience. It also provides the headquarters of the WKU Forensics Team, a prominent club that has won numerous national competitions.

In April 2006, the lower floors of Cherry Hall were damaged by a fire, which was determined to be arson. The damage to the hall was repaired and classes resumed in the facility the next semester.

Four teenagers were arrested for the crime the following June.

== Symbolism ==
Cherry Hall provides a good deal of the symbolism associated with Western Kentucky University. The belltower atop the hall is part of the current logo of the school. The 25 chimes in the belltower cupola play once every fifteen minutes, to signal the time in order to aid students in keeping up with classtimes. At the top of every hour, the chimes play a longer tune to signal the new hour.
