= College Heights Herald =

Student newspaper of Western Kentucky University

- Type: Student magazine
- Format: Magazine
- Owner: Western Kentucky University
- Editor: Price Wilborn
- Founded: Jan. 29, 1925
- Political alignment: Independent
- Headquarters: Adams-Whitaker Student Publications Center, Bowling Green, Kentucky US
- Price: Free
- Website: wkuherald.com

The College Heights Herald is the student newspaper of Western Kentucky University in Bowling Green, Kentucky, United States. It is free and distributed throughout the campus and city. The school provides professional staff support and facilities for the newspaper but does not exercise editorial control. Called the Herald or the WKU Herald for short, the publication is supported through the sale of advertising and is entirely student-run.

== Distribution ==
During the fall and spring semesters, the Herald print edition is published as a news magazine three times a semester. With a circulation of about 3,000, it serves a campus of about 16,000 with exclusive enterprise not previously published online. The Herald is distributed to more than 100 locations on campus and in Bowling Green.

== Awards ==
The newspaper has been the recipient of 21 ACP Pacemaker awards, the highest award given to collegiate newspapers, most recently earning two Pacemakers in 2022 (news magazine and online). The Herald also was a finalist for the ACP Multiplatform Pacemaker. The College Heights Herald is a member of the ACP Hall of Fame and is No. 6 on the list of the most successful student media outlets in the century-long history of the ACP Pacemaker Awards.

The Herald also has won multiple Gold Crown Awards and Silver Crown Awards from the Columbia Scholastic Press Association (CSPA).

Other awards include being named the best non-daily student newspaper in the country by the Society of Professional Journalists and 12 General Excellence Awards from the Kentucky Press Association, the most recent in 2014, 2015 and 2016.
