= Swimming in the United States =

- Country: United States
- Governing body: USA Swimming
- National teams: United States Olympics team, United States national team

National competitions
- U.S. Masters Swimming

International competitions
- FINA World Aquatics Championships; Summer Olympics

Swimming in the United States began competitively in the 1880s. The first nationally recognized swimming organization was the Amateur Athletic Union in 1888.

== History ==
In the 1920s and 1930s, public swimming pools became more accessible to the general public.

=== USA Swimming ===
The Amateur Athletic Union (AAU) was the official organization responsible for the running of all amateur sports in the United States, established in 1888. The AAU was officially charged with the organization and operation of many sports in the US. During this time, swimming was one of the committees in the organization and was not an independent governing body.

The Amateur Sports Act of 1978 enabled the governance of sports in the US by organizations other than the AAU. This act made each sport set up its own National governing body (NGB). Each of these governing bodies would be part of the United States Olympic Committee, but would not be run by the committee. Thus, USA Swimming was born. From 1978 to 1980, the official responsibilities of governing the sport were transferred from the AAU Swimming Committee to the new United States Swimming. Bill Lippman, the last head of the Swimming Committee, and Ross Wales, the first president of United States Swimming, worked together to ease the transition. This process was made more complex because the United States boycotted the 1980 Summer Olympics and, during this time, the leadership of the sport was in flux.

=== International competition ===
The United States is the dominant force in international competitive swimming.

== Collegiate swimming ==
Young swimmers compete on club teams and may wish to continue their careers through college. Prior to July 1, people can complete recruiting questionnaires for schools they are interested in. The recruiting process for collegiate swimming often starts on 1 July following the athlete's junior year of high school. That date marks the day that college coaches can contact athletes via phone to discuss possibly swimming for their team. After speaking with high school recruits via phone and email, college coaches are able to invite athletes on official recruiting trips, during which the recruits participate in a wide range of activities. Such activities include meeting the team members, attending classes, meetings, and athletic events in order to gain an idea about what it might be like to attend that college. The trips are funded by the athletic department and are known as structured sales pitches designed to impress the student-athlete. Each student-athlete is allowed to take five official recruiting trips, each lasting no longer than 48 hours. Swimmers most often base their college decisions on how well they mesh with the existing team and coaching staff, the location of the school, the academic opportunities, and the cost of attendance.

Student-athletes must reach a certain standard of academic performance depending on which college they seek to attend. In some cases, the athletic department may have some control over who is admitted. Once admitted however, academic regulation and policies, such as mandated study hall and credit hours, are strictly enforced. Swimmers can choose from competing in Division I, Division II, Division III, or the NAIA. Swimmers that choose to compete in Divisions I through III adhere to the rules set by the NCAA.

The collegiate swimming season spans from mid-October to mid-March and ends with the NCAA Championship meet. Meets between two or three teams, known as dual meets or the latter as tri-meets, run throughout the season at collegiate facilities. Conference championships, usually lasting four or five days, include all teams in each conference and are usually held at larger aquatics facilities to accommodate spectators. Collegiate swimmers are eligible to compete in the NCAA championships for Division I, II, and III contingent upon swimmers meeting the qualifying time standards. The qualifying time standard for the NCAA Championships are based on the times that qualified for 16th and 24th place for the meets the previous three years.

The NCAA invites 235 male swimmers and 281 female swimmers to the competition each year based on the qualifying standards. There are two qualifying standards, "A" and "B", where those qualifying with the "A" time standard are automatically invited to the championship. Then the next fastest swimmers with the "B" time standard are invited to keep each of the events even. This process is repeated until all of invite spots are filled.

The NCAA qualifying times varies across the different Divisions. The qualifying standards for the NCAA Championship meet can be found on the NCAA championships site.

=== Hazing ===
In 2020, The Intercollegiate, a publication about college athletics, conducted a review of 236 different collegiate sports programs and found that the programs most likely to have rules specifically addressing hazing were the American football and swimming teams. In 2014, five members of the swim team at the University of Virginia had been suspended and later faced a lawsuit following allegations of hazing by a previous team member. The following year, a hazing scandal at Western Kentucky University resulted in the university's entire swimming and diving programs being suspended for five years. However, due to budget cuts in 2018, the program is still inactive as of 2024. Following this scandal, SwimSwam published an opinion piece written by sport psychologist Keith Bell and swimming coach Bridger Bell in which they discussed the prevalence of hazing practices in swimming teams across the United States, saying in part, "We don’t know of any swimmers who have died as a result of hazing; however, we do know that there is hazing on swim teams that bears striking resemblance to what happened at WKU and also resembles hazing that elsewhere has lead[sic] to student deaths".

In January 2017, Brian Reynolds, the head coach of Drury University's swimming program, announced that he would be "stepping back" from his coaching duties after he was implicated by a former swimmer of involvement in team hazing activities. Later that same year, the women's swim team at Dartmouth College was placed on probation for hazing, while the program at East Carolina University underwent an internal investigation following hazing allegations. These incidents, as well as another 2017 incident where the swimming program at Bucknell University was placed on probation due to alcohol-related hazing incidents, prompted another opinion piece from SwimSwam wherein they stated that the problem of hazing had reached "almost reaching epidemic levels in the sport of swimming over the past few years". The publication further states, "This has to be said. College swimmers: stop hazing and initiation drinking events for new members of your teams. Or you’re not going to have a team much longer". In 2023 and 2024, the swimming program at Boston College and the men's team at the University of Notre Dame, respectively, were placed on one-year suspensions for issues related to hazing.

== Ethnic minorities ==
Black people in the United States are less likely to be able to swim or swim regularly. This is partly due to aftereffects of segregation, during which access to swimming places for black people was limited due to racism.

Simone Manuel was the first African American woman to win a gold medal in Olympic swimming.
