= Stunt girl =

Type of woman investigative journalist

A stunt girl was a woman investigative journalist in the late 19th and early 20th centuries in the United States. The term was often used derogatorily.

The genre impacted the law, labor, and journalism.

== History ==
Throughout the 1880s and 1890s multiple newspapers employed women who went undercover into factories, mills, institutions, hospitals, agencies, and tenements to report on conditions or expose scams or scandals. Some investigations lasted for weeks or months, with the stunt girl writing regular reports while still undercover. Most stunt girls used pseudonyms.

Male reporters were designated "investigative journalists" while female reporters doing the same kind of work were called "stunt girls". The term referred to the idea that women doing this kind of work were doing something "bizarre or sensational" and that women who were strong or brave or independent were oddities. Sometimes called "participatory journalism", it was the means for many women writers to extend their journalism outside of the society pages to the front page. As stunt girl reporting became increasingly popular, there was a corresponding backlash of misogyny in the newsrooms. The World created the "Meg Merrilies" byline which was given credit for stories by any of the stunt girls other than Nellie Bly.

More traditional woman journalists, such as Ida Tarbell, scorned the stunt girls.

Over time the genre evolved from investigations of social ills to ever-more sensational capers such as describing what it felt like to be strapped into an electric chair or spending a night in a supposed haunted house.

By the end of the 19th century, the stunt girl genre was discredited, its journalists reduced to reporting on such things as nights spent in supposed haunted houses, and became associated with yellow journalism. According to academic Kim Todd, it was "disdained as a particularly female variety of trash." The genre had a resurgence with the advent of tabloid journalism in the 1920s.

By the modern period the genre was widely denigrated. According to Todd, "If the form is known at all, it is referenced with a sneer."

== Notable investigations ==
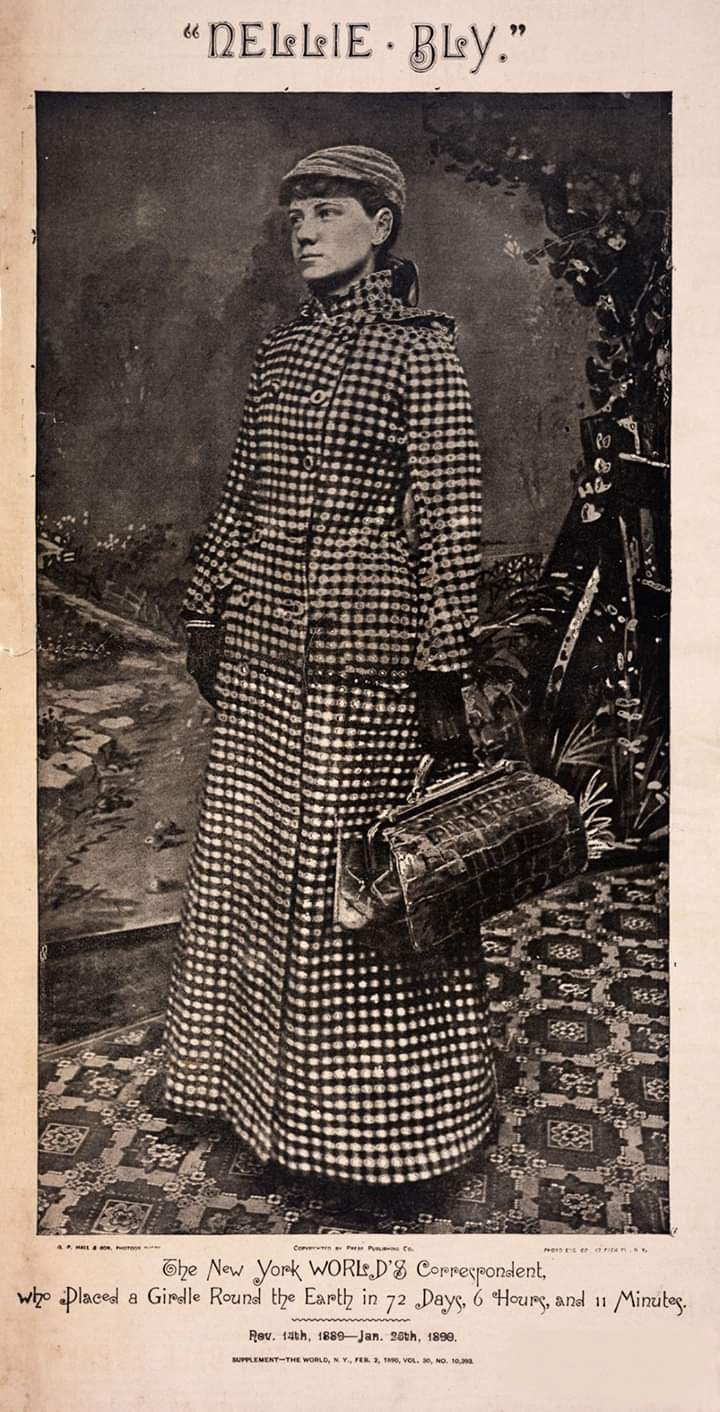
Publicity photo for Bly's "Around the World" series

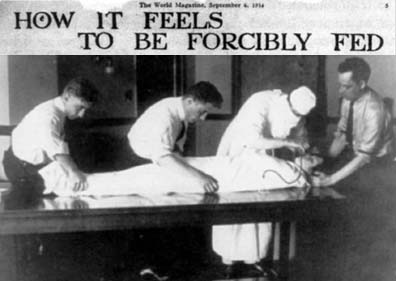
A photograph of Barnes being forcibly fed

In 1887, Nellie Bly spent ten days living in Blackwell's Island, an institution housing people with mental illness, and wrote for the World an exposé, Inside the Madhouse, which documented the abuse of patients. (Note: With due caution, Bly had notified the district attorney's office of her plans before being committed to the asylum.) Bly followed up her Madhouse series with similar investigations, such as The Girls Who Make Boxes: Nellie Bly Tells How It Feels to Be a White Slave, Visiting the Dispensaries: Nelly [sic] Bly Narrowly Escapes Having Her Tonsils Amputated, and Nellie Bly in Pullman: She Visits the Homes of Poverty in the 'Model Workingman's Town'.

A "girl reporter", whose identity remains unknown, in 1888 investigated the availability of abortion in Chicago by visiting over 200 physicians over the course of three weeks.

In 1888, Nell Cusack, under the by-line Nell Nelson, went undercover in the factories of Chicago for the Chicago Times. She wrote a 21-part "White Slave Girls" series that was endorsed by the Chicago Trades and Labor Assembly and earned her a book contract. The series was reprinted several months later in the World.

In 1889, Joseph Pulitzer, editor of The New York World, challenged Bly to circumnavigate the world, mimicking the novel Around the World in 80 Days. Almost a million readers submitted entries to Pulitzer's contest to guess how long it would take her. Bly completed the journey in 72 days, filing dispatches with the World as frequently as possible.

Although Djuna Barnes entered journalism after the heyday of the stunt girls, she incorporated their methods in her writing. Her most famous stunt, documented in the New York World Magazine in 1914, involved having herself force-fed to document how the British government was treating suffragists.

== Impact ==
Academic Kim Todd wrote that "stunt reporters changed laws, launched labor movements, and redefined what it meant to be a journalist." Articles by "Annie Laurie" for the San Francisco Examiner led to the establishment of an ambulance service in San Francisco; changes to the treatments for female patients at San Francisco Receiving Hospital; a ward for incurables at the San Francisco Children's Hospital; and financial donations for the leper colony on Molokai and for Galveston after the 1900 hurricane.

After Bly's exposé on Blackwell's Island, New York City spent $50,000 on management of institutions housing people with mental illness. In one stunt, Bly posed as an unwed mother and caught a trafficker in infants. In another, her exposé of a corrupt lobbyist ran him out of Albany. Eva McDonald's work investigating labor conditions impacted the rise of labor journalism.

== Legacy ==
Todd wrote that stunt girl journalism was an early example of immersion journalism, paved the way for muckraking and New Journalism, and were an early form of creative nonfiction.

== Notable stunt girls ==
- Elizabeth Banks
- Djuna Barnes
- Winifred Black
- Nelly Bly
- Dorothy Dare
- Faith Fenton
- Eliza Putnam Heaton
- Dorothy Kilgallen
- Caroline Lockhart
- Nora Marks
- Winifred Mulcahey
- Nell Nelson
- Kate Swan McGuirk
- Ada Patterson
- Eva Valesh

=== Fictional stunt girls ===
- Torchy Blane

== See also ==
- Immersion journalism
- Sob sister
- Women in journalism
- Women's page
