= Leaving Metropolis =

- Directed by: Brad Fraser
- Written by: Brad Fraser (play and screenplay)
- Produced by: Ken Mead; Paul Stiles; Kim Todd
- Starring: Troy Ruptash; Vince Corazza; Lynda Boyd; Cherilee Taylor; Thom Allison
- Cinematography: Daniel Vincelette
- Edited by: Earl Fudger
- Music by: Dennis Burke
- Distributed by: Film Tonic
- Release date: 2002
- Running time: 89 minutes
- Country: Canada
- Language: English

Leaving Metropolis is a 2002 Canadian drama film, written and directed by Brad Fraser as an adaptation of his theatrical play Poor Super Man. The film, about a gay man and a married heterosexual man who fall in love, was filmed in Winnipeg, Manitoba, and played the international gay and lesbian film festival circuit throughout 2002 and 2003.

== Plot ==
David (Troy Ruptash) is a well-known artist who is blocked. He decides to take a job as a waiter to try to find inspiration. His friend and roommate Shannon (Thom Allison), a pre-op male-to-female transsexual, stumbles across the Main St. Diner, owned by Matt (Vince Corazza) and Violet (Cherilee Taylor), who are looking for a waiter. David gets hired and quickly becomes close with the couple although they don't know of his standing in the art community and are surprised to learn that he's gay. David's friend Kryla (Lynda Boyd), a columnist for the Winnipeg Tribune, tracks David down at the diner against his wishes. An annoyed David demands that she write up the diner in her column, which she does. The diner's business picks up considerably.

Shannon, whose sex reassignment surgery has been repeatedly delayed because of her HIV-positive status, begins to become ill. David has a painting installed and Kryla gets his photo in the paper. Matt and Violet see the photo and realize that he's famous.

David and Matt start hanging out. Matt, who had tried his hand at drawing comic books, pesters David to show him his paintings but David resists. Matt confesses that he had once fallen in love with another man in college although he hadn't acted on it. David, finding himself drawn to Matt, paints him nude (although Matt doesn't pose). He tells Matt that there's a painting he needs to see. Matt comes to David's place and sees the painting. He becomes aroused and the two begin an affair.

David paints two more portraits of Matt, who still doesn't actually pose. Kryla and Shannon hail them as his best work and entreat him to exhibit them but Matt, nervous about how Violet would react, makes him promise not to. Each also tells the other that he loves him. They keep the relationship secret, though, especially in the face of the vehement disapproval Kryla expresses to David at the idea of his sleeping with a married man.

Kryla soon discovers the affair when she walks in on David and Matt having sex. A panicked Matt tells David that he lied about loving him and flees. In the aftermath of the affair, Shannon convinces David to break his promise and exhibit the paintings. He does so under the title "Straightman." When Matt learns of the show he confronts David, first threatening to destroy the paintings and then offering himself again sexually. David contemptuously dismisses him. Matt tells Violet about the paintings and about the affair and admits that he is in love with David. She demands a divorce.

Shannon, who has grown progressively more ill, decides to take her life. As she dies, David runs into Kryla at a bar and they have a bitter fight.

Violet attends the opening but merely tells David that the paintings are very good. As she's leaving Matt arrives and she refuses to give him another chance. After the opening Matt again approaches David who also rebuffs him.

At film's end, Violet sells the Main St. Diner and Matt has left town. David has also decided to leave. He and Kryla reconcile.

== Cast ==
- Troy Ruptash as David
- Vince Corazza (billed as Vincent Corazza) as Matt
- Lynda Boyd as Kryla
- Cherilee Taylor as Violet
- Thom Allison as Shannon
- Arne MacPherson as Homeless Man
- Tom Anniko as Businessman
- Paul Stafford as Goth Boy
- Chris Sigurdson (billed as Christopher Sigurdson) as Complimentary Customer
- Susan Kelso as Dr. Starbell
- Blake Taylor as Shepherd's Pie Customer
- Kirsten Johnson as Sharon
- John Bluethner as Mayor
- David Brindle as Television Announcer

== Superman ==
The film is set against the backdrop of several events in the fictional life of Superman in the early 1990s, including his revealing his secret identity and marriage to Lois Lane and The Death of Superman storyline. The events in the comics parallel events in the lives of the characters.

== Awards and nominations ==
2002 Montréal World Film Festival Grand Prix des Amériques - nominated

== DVD release ==
Leaving Metropolis was released on Region 1 DVD on April 6, 2004.
