= Six Months in Mexico =

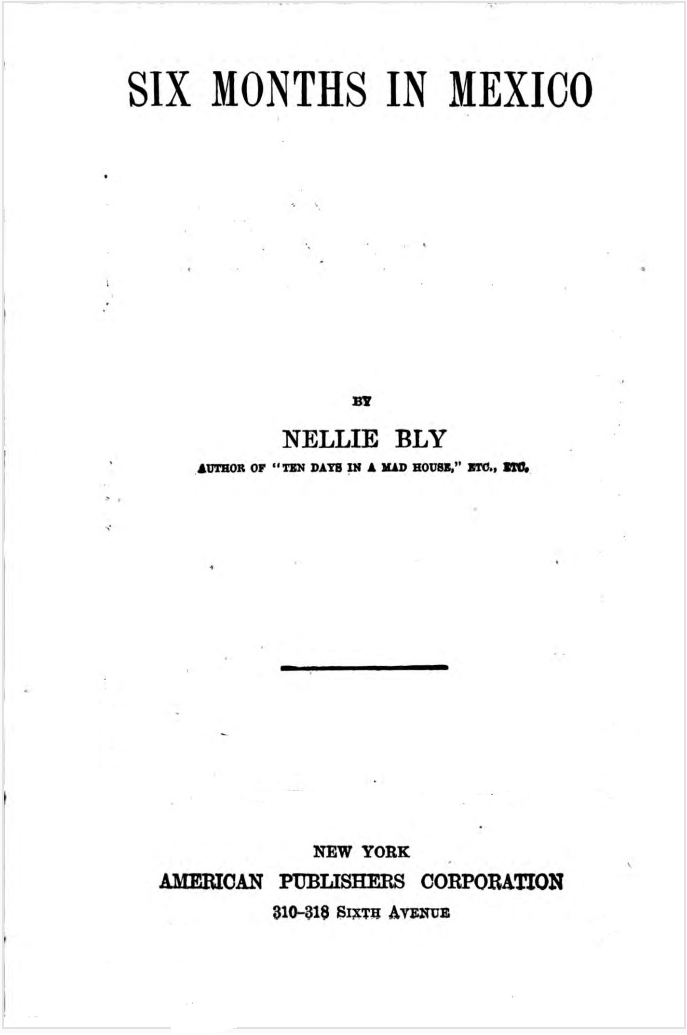
- Title page
- Author: Nellie Bly
- Language: English
- Genre: investigative journalism
- Publisher: American Publishers, New York City
- Publication date: 1888
- Publication place: United States
- Media type: Print (Hardback and Paperback)
- Pages: 205

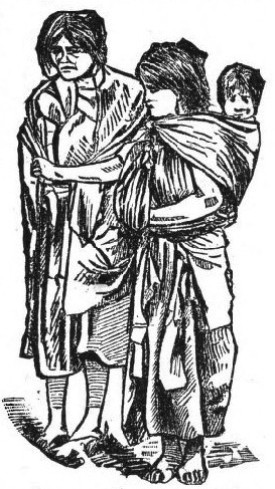
Illustration from the book depicting the Mexican people

Six Months in Mexico is a book written by Elizabeth Jane Cochrane under her pen name Nellie Bly about her travels through Mexico around 1885. She took the initiative to work as a foreign correspondent at the age of 21. At that point she had been writing for the newspaper The Pittsburgh Dispatch, but had become dissatisfied with having to write for the women's pages.

In the book she describes the lives and customs of the people of Mexico and the poverty of the common people. She was struck by the widespread addiction to playing the lottery, noting that people would even pawn their clothes in order to buy tickets. She also described courtship, wedding ceremonies, the popularity of tobacco smoking, the legend of the maguey plant from which pulque and mezcal were made, and the habits of the soldiers, including an early mention of their marijuana use:

The soldiers have an herb named marijuana, which they roll into small cigaros and smoke. It produces intoxication which lasts for five days, and for that period they are in paradise. It has no ill after-effects, yet the use is forbidden by law. It is commonly used among prisoners. One cigaro is made, and the prisoners all sitting in a ring partake of it. The smoker takes a draw and blows the smoke into the mouth of the nearest man, he likewise gives it to another, and so on around the circle. One cigaro will intoxicate the whole lot for the length of five days.

Bly returned to the United States after her reporting on the imprisonment of a journalist by dictator Porfirio Díaz put her in danger of imprisonment herself.

Bly later wrote a second travel book, Around the World in 72 Days, telling the story of her circumnavigation of the globe by ship and train.
