= Elizabeth Banks (journalist) =

American journalist

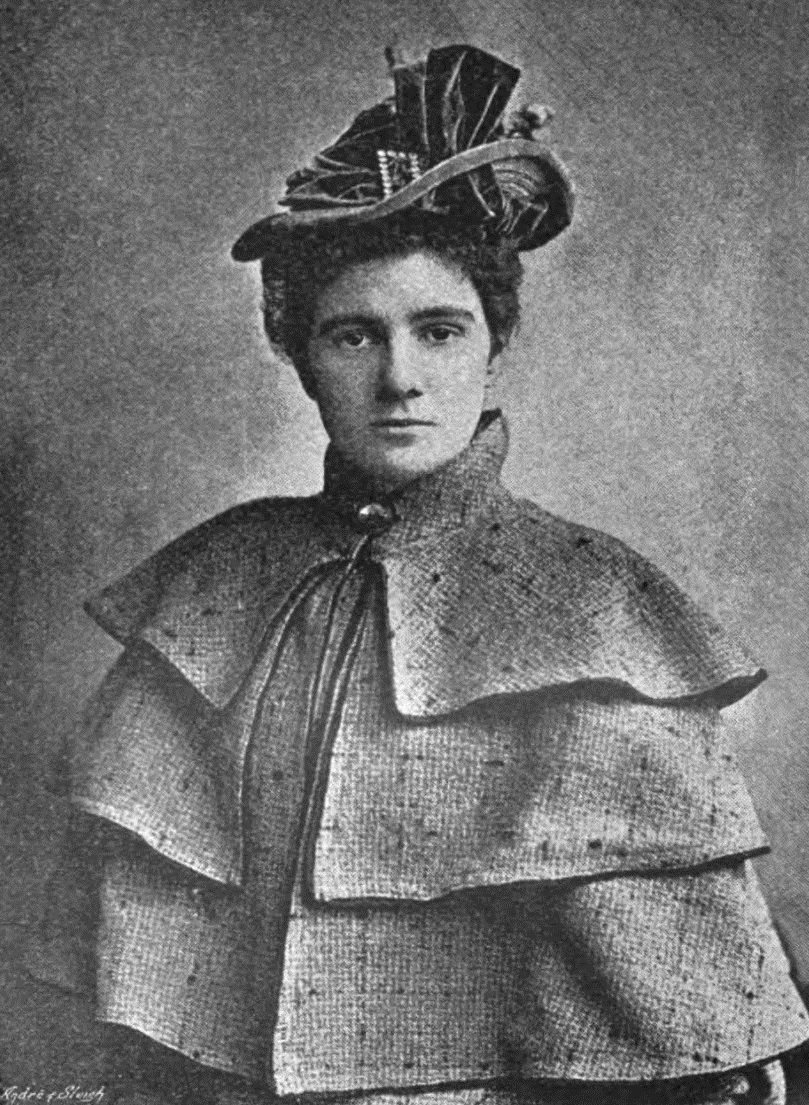
- Circa 1894
- Born: Elizabeth Brister Banks; May 2, 1865; Trenton, New Jersey, USA
- Died: July 18, 1938 (aged 73); London, England, UK
- Other names: "Enid", "Mary Mortimer Maxwell"
- Occupation: Journalist

Elizabeth Brister Banks (May 2, 1865 – July 18, 1938) (Note: Elizabeth Banks often provided a later birth year, in order encourage a perception that she was younger. However, US census reports indicate that she was born in 1865.) was an American journalist and writer. Although she never renounced her American citizenship, she remained in England throughout the last forty years of her life.

== Biography ==
Elizabeth was born in Trenton, New Jersey, the daughter of John Banks and Sarah Ann Brister. As a young child, she was raised by her aunt Elizabeth Brister and uncle Joseph Peck on "the experimental farm" north of Madison, Wisconsin, near Deansville. She attended Milwaukee Downer Female Seminary College in Milwaukee when it was still located at Fox Lake, Wisconsin.

She became a typewriter girl in a grocery store, then worked society pages in Baltimore and Saint Paul, Minnesota. She worked as secretary at the American Consulate in Peru, later becoming a stunt girl journalist when other women writers were relegated to society and fashion pages.

Unable to find reliable work in the United States, Banks moved to England in 1893. There, she undertook an undercover investigation into the lives of domestic services which she published in the Weekly Sun under the byline "American Girl in London"; the series of seven articles was later published as a book titled Campaigns of Curiosity. Referring to her immediate success, George Robert Sims noted the author was "the charming lady journalist who has made the biggest score out of the disguise business since the days of the Amateur Casual". Journalist William L. Alden, however, criticized Banks not for the deception of working undercover but for sharing details about British families. As he wrote, the stories were "certainly not in accordance with the ethics of decent London journalism" and "were generally thought to be in extremely bad taste".

She continued to work in London, where she became a regular contributor to publications such as The Daily News, Punch, St James' Gazette, London Illustrated, and Referee. She created a sensation in London by recording her observations on the plight of the lower classes, which she researched posing as a housemaid, street sweeper, and Covent Garden flower girl. Her journalistic writing under several pen names including pseudonyms of Mary Mortimer Maxwell and Enid, unceasingly promoted women's right to vote and denounced prison conditions for jailed suffragettes.

Elizabeth lived in London (Note: According to sources such as Who’s Who and US Department of State travel records, Banks lived in a number of places in London, with 5 Robert Street in the Adelphi area between the Strand and the Thames as the major one at the height of her career. Contributions to Who’s Who were usually made by the subject, and as such should be considered carefully.) at 17 Downing Street, close to the Prime Minister's residence. Her neighbors and friends included George Bernard Shaw, John Galsworthy, Thomas Hardy, H. G. Wells and suffragette Henrietta Marston. She made major contributions to British Intelligence in developing strategies to help protect London from German aerial attacks and developing propaganda schemes that helped draw the United States into the first world war. According to Who's Who in America (volume 20, 1938) "in 1914 she founded the Authors' Belgian Fund and Dirk's fund for the Allies. She originated and also wrote a series of controversial essays entitled The Lady at the Round Table".

She made a trip back to the United States and wrote an autobiographical work, The Remaking of an American (1928), which followed up previous autobiographies Campaigns of Curiosity (1894) and Autobiography of a Newspaper Girl (1902). Careful to protect her sources in both her letters and written works, the bulk of her personal papers were destroyed upon her death. She died on July 18, 1938, of arteriosclerosis, then was cremated and her ashes deposited at Golders Green Crematorium.
