= Eliza Putnam Heaton =

American journalist and editor

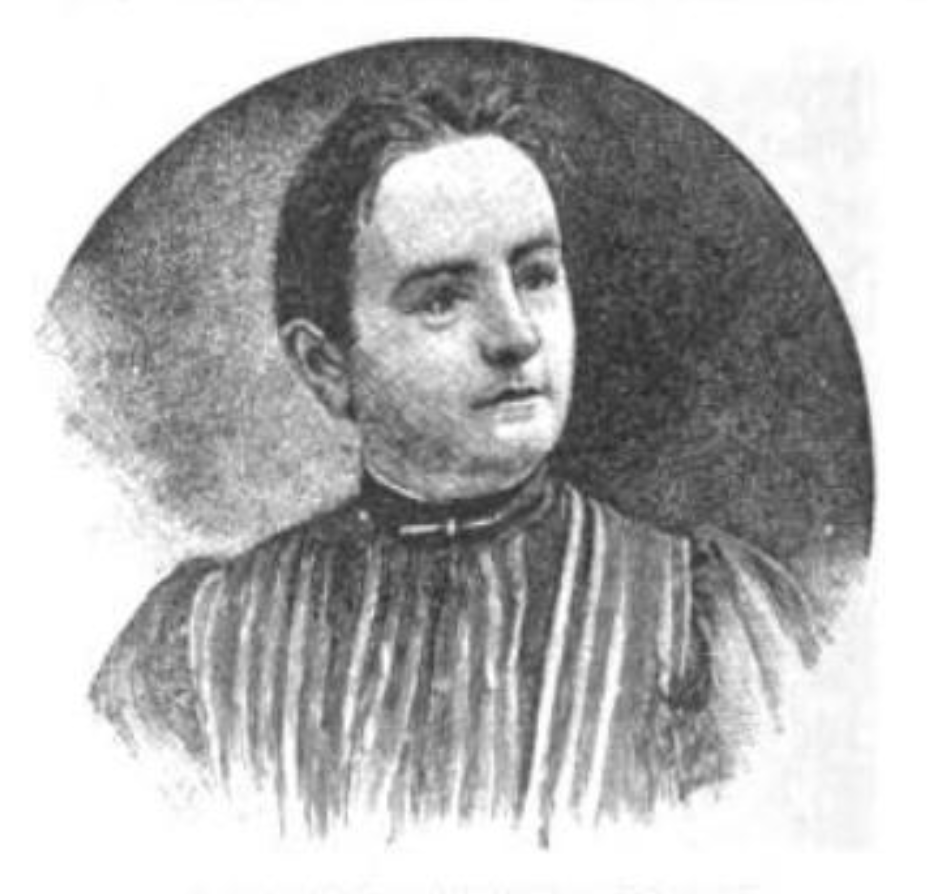
- Born: Eliza Osborn Putnam; August 8, 1860; Danvers, Massachusetts, U.S.
- Died: January 2, 1919 (aged 58); Brooklyn, New York, U.S.
- Occupations: Journalist, editor
- Spouse: John Langdon Heaton (m. 1882)
- Writing career
- Notable work: By-paths in Sicily

Eliza Putnam Heaton (née, Putnam; August 8, 1860 – January 2, 1919) was an American journalist and editor. After her marriage and removal to New York, Heaton began newspaper work, serving first as special writer and afterward as a managing editor in newspaper and syndicate offices, until failing health made arduous tasks impossible. When the New York Recorder was started in 1891, she undertook a task never before attempted by any New York daily – to run a daily news page dealing with women's movements. Marooned in Sicily by ill-health, the author turned for occupation to the study of peasant life, a study eagerly pursued until it was cut short by her death in 1919. Her By-paths in Sicily, could fairly be presented as completed.

== Early life and education ==
Eliza Osborn Putnam was born in Danvers, Massachusetts, August 8, 1860. She was the daughter of Rev. James W. Putnam, a Universalist minister. She came from Revolutionary ancestry, and was a delicate child.

Putnam attended school irregularly when she was young, her education beginning in Danvers and Salem schools. She studied at St. Lawrence University before transferring to Boston University. In 1882, she was graduated from that school, where she was an honor student in the classic tongues, well fitted her for a writer's career.

== Career ==
In 1882, she married John Langdon Heaton, then associate-editor of the Brooklyn Daily Times. Her newspaper work as an occasional contributor to the columns of that paper began almost immediately. In 1886, she took an office desk and position upon the editorial staff of the Times. For four years, she wrote in nearly every department of the paper, her work appearing mostly on the editorial page and in the special sheets of the Saturday edition, and ranging from politics to illustrated city sketches, for which her camera furnished the pictures. She handled the exchange editor's scissors and did a vast deal of descriptive writing and interviewing. Almost coincident with her engagement upon the Times was her entrance into the syndicate field. Through a prominent syndicate publishing firm of New York City, she sent out an average of three New York letters per week, illustrated from photographs taken by herself, and dealing with men, women and current topics of the day.

As a stunt girl reporter, she took passage from Liverpool, England to New York in the steerage of the Cunard Line's RMS Aurania in September, 1888, for the purpose of studying life among the immigrants. She landed with her fellow-travelers at New York City's Castle Garden, then accompanied them to Chicago by train. Her resulting article, titled "A Sham Emigrant's Voyage to New York" was published in multiple newspapers, including the Brooklyn Times.

When the New York Recorder was started in 1891, she undertook a task never before attempted by any New York daily – to run a daily news page dealing with women's movements. The experiment was successful and became recognized as the unique and especially attractive feature of the paper. She resigned this position to join her husband on the Providence News, which he established in September of that year. From the first issue of the new daily, Mr. and Mrs. Heaton were associated as joint-editors, and during a long and critical illness, into which Mr. Heaton fell at the end of the first few weeks of its existence, Mrs. Heaton was for months sole responsible editor.

== Personal life ==
Heaton was one of the founders of the Woman's Press Club, a member of the Brooklyn Woman's Club, and a member of the professional women's club Sorosis. In later life, she passed many of the winter seasons in Taormina, Italy. While there, she was able to do rescue work after the 1908 Messina earthquake. At that time she also wrote the book By-paths in Sicily, which was published after her death but, according to biographers, "could fairly be presented as completed."

She died January 2, 1919, at her home, 131 Westminster Road, Brooklyn, New York, and was survived by her husband, a son, James P. Heaton, a daughter, Mrs. Howard C Root, and two grandchildren.

== Selected works ==
- Thoughts by the way, 1891
- Among veiled women, 1897
- The steerage: a sham immigrant's voyage to New York in 1888, 1919
- By-paths in Sicily, 1920
