= Around the World in Seventy-Two Days =

1890 book by Nellie Bly

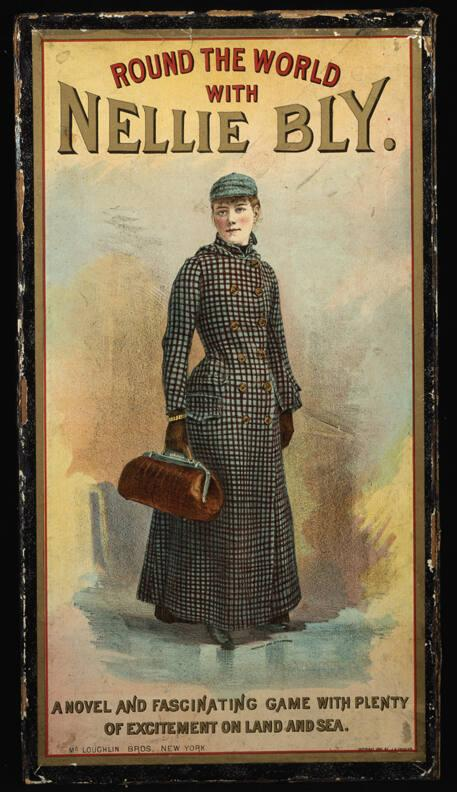
- "Round the World with Nellie Bly" board game box
- Author: Nellie Bly
- Language: English
- Publisher: Pictorial Weeklies
- Publication date: 1890
- Publication place: United States
- OCLC: 4363117
- Text: Around the World in Seventy-Two Days at Wikisource

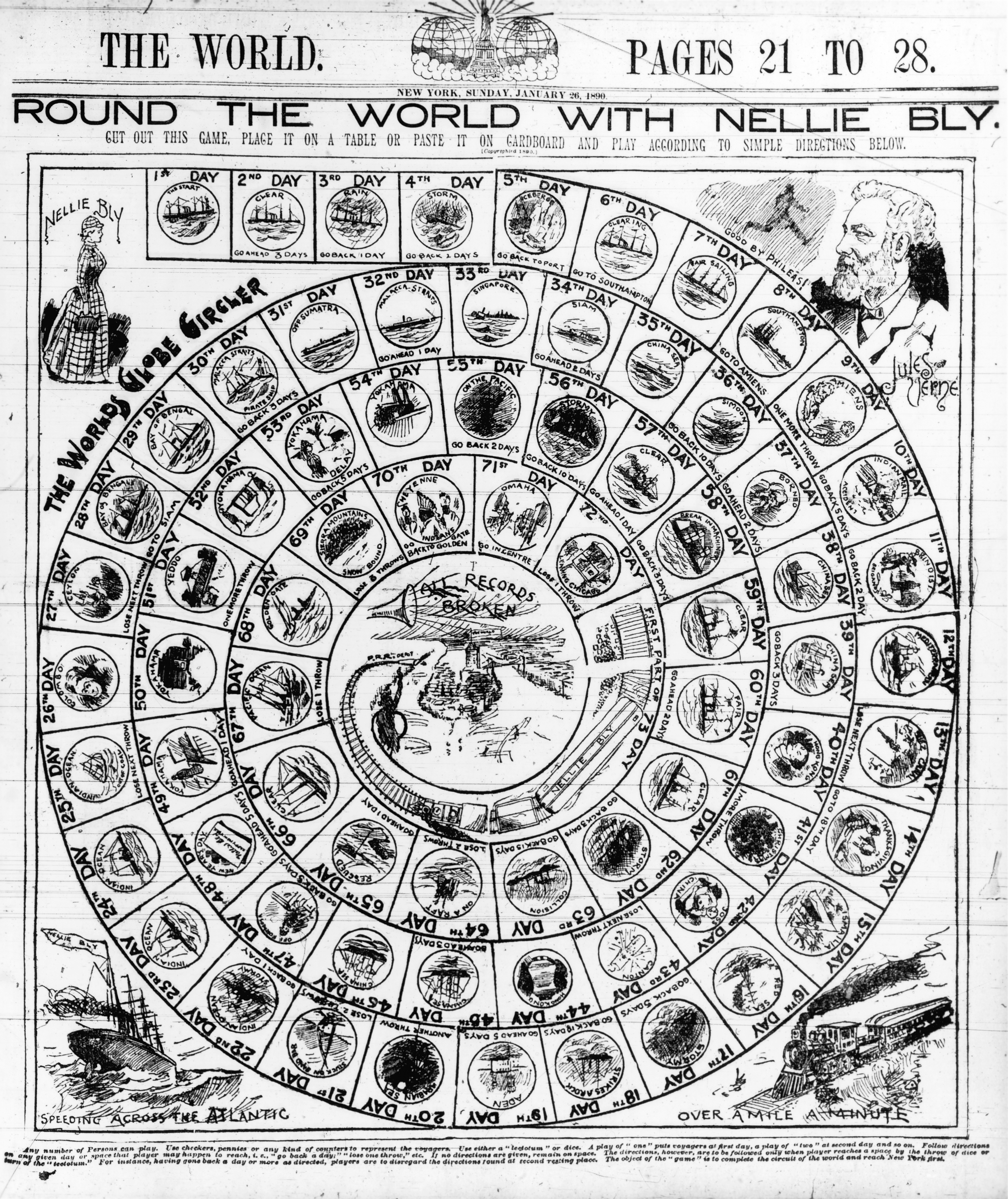
Game board illustrating journalist Nellie Bly's circumnavigation of the globe (1889–1890), in the New York World, 26 January 1890.

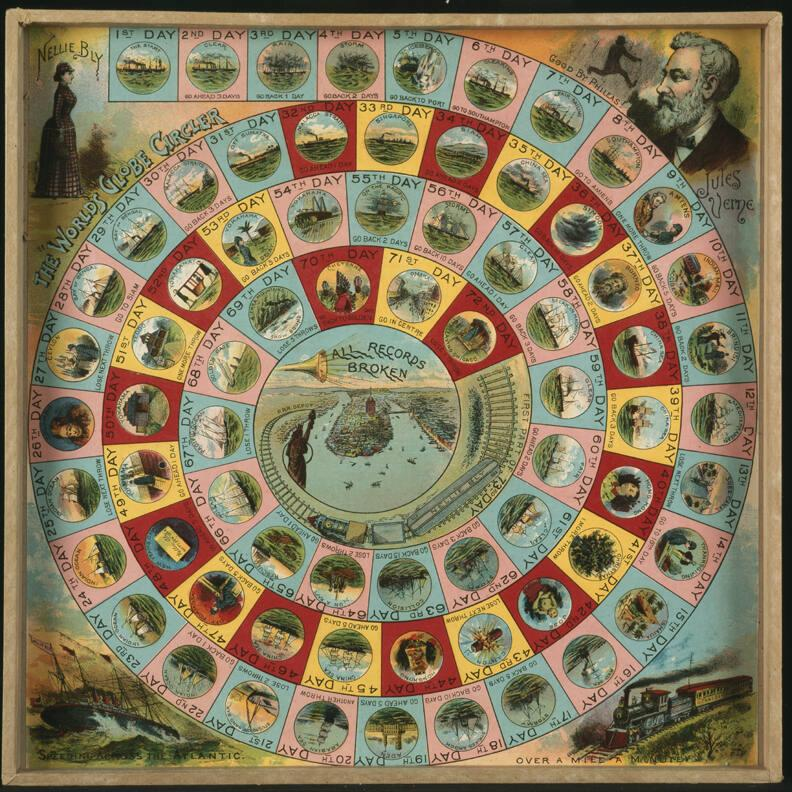
Round the World with Nellie Bly game board

Around the World in Seventy-Two Days is an 1890 book by journalist Elizabeth Jane Cochrane, writing under her pseudonym, Nellie Bly. The chronicle details her 72-day trip around the world, which was inspired by the 1873 book Around the World in Eighty Days by Jules Verne. She carried out the journey for Joseph Pulitzer's tabloid newspaper, the New York World.

== Journey ==
In 1888, Bly suggested to her editor at the New York World that she take a trip around the world, attempting to turn the fictional Around the World in Eighty Days into fact for the first time. A year later, at 9:40 a.m. on November 14, 1889, she boarded the Augusta Victoria, a steamer of the Hamburg America Line, and began her journey with the goal of finishing in 75 days.

She brought with her the dress she was wearing, a sturdy overcoat, several changes of underwear and a small travel bag carrying her toiletry essentials. She carried most of her money (£200 in English bank notes and gold in total as well as some American currency) in a bag tied around her neck.

The New York magazine Cosmopolitan sponsored its own reporter, Elizabeth Bisland, to beat the time of both Phileas Fogg and Bly. Bisland would travel the opposite way around the world. Bly, however, did not learn of Bisland's journey until reaching Hong Kong. She dismissed the cheap competition. "I would not race," she said. "If someone else wants to do the trip in less time, that is their concern."

To sustain interest in the story, the World organized a "Bly Guessing Match" in which readers were asked to estimate Bly's arrival time to the second, with the Grand Prize consisting at first of a free trip to Europe and, later on, spending money for the trip.

On her travels around the world, Bly went through England; France, where she met Jules Verne in Amiens; Brindisi in southern Italy; the Suez Canal; Colombo in Ceylon; the Straits Settlements (British territories) of Penang and Singapore on the Malay Peninsula; Hong Kong; and Japan. The development of efficient submarine cable networks and the electric telegraph allowed Bly to send short progress reports, though longer dispatches had to travel by regular post and were thus often delayed by several weeks.

Bly travelled using steamships and the existing railroad systems, which caused occasional setbacks, particularly on the Asian leg of her race. During these stops, she visited a leper colony in China and she bought a monkey in Singapore.

== Homecoming ==
As a result of rough weather on her Pacific crossing, she arrived in San Francisco on the White Star liner Oceanic on January 21, two days behind schedule. However, World owner Pulitzer chartered a private train to bring her home. The Miss Nellie Bly Special was a one-time, record-breaking passenger train operated by the Atchison, Topeka and Santa Fe Railway from San Francisco, California to Chicago, Illinois for reporter Nellie Bly. The specially missioned train set new speed records over the line, completing the 2,577-mile (4,147 km) journey in 69 hours, averaging 37 mph (60 km/h) in the process. Along the way, Bly presented each division superintendent with a quart of G. H. Mumm Extra Dry Champagne.

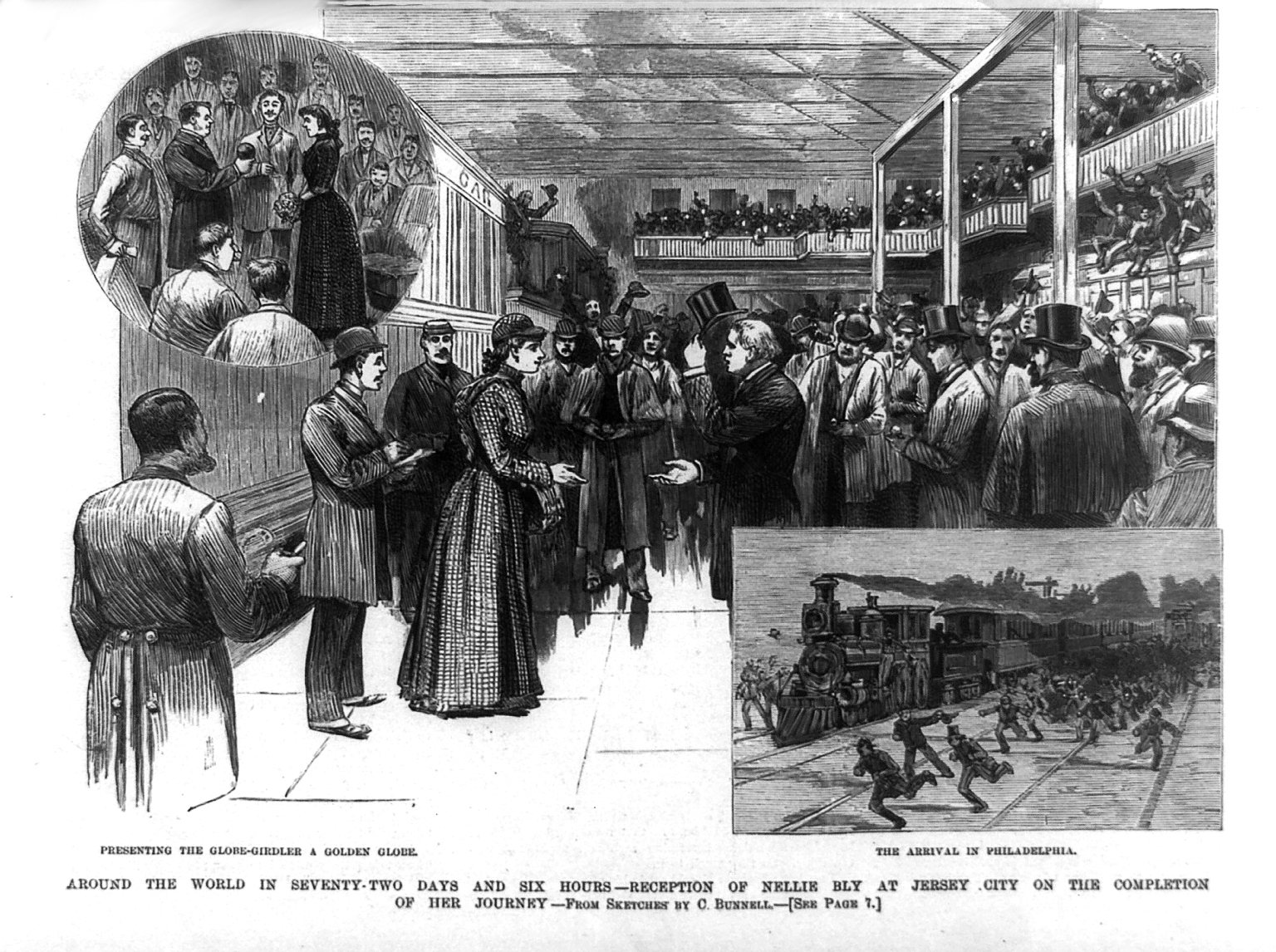
A woodcut image of Nellie Bly's homecoming reception in Jersey City printed in Frank Leslie's Illustrated News on February 8, 1890.

Bly arrived back in New Jersey on January 25, 1890, at 3:51 p.m, completing her journey 72 days, 6 hours, and 11 minutes after leaving Hoboken. At the time, Bisland was still going around the world. Like Bly, she had missed a connection and had to board a slow, old ship (the Bothnia) in the place of a fast ship (Etruria). Bly's journey, at the time, was a world record, though it was bettered a few months later by George Francis Train, who completed the journey in 67 days. By 1913, Andre Jaeger-Schmidt, Henry Frederick and John Henry Mears had improved on the record, the latter completing the journey in less than 36 days. The current record is approximately 90 minutes, a multi-way tie held by all astronauts who have ever completely orbited the earth.

== Route ==
The following table summarizes principal places in Bly's journey, based mainly on her published itinerary and on places named in the narrative of Around the World in Seventy-Two Days. Some intermediate rail points and approximate dates are inferred from Bly's stated route, sequence of travel, or travel times, and are marked as inferred.

| Place | Date/time | Source |
|---|---|---|
| Hoboken, New Jersey / New York Harbor | 14 November 1889, 9:40:30 a.m. | In Chapter II, Bly records leaving New York on the steamship Augusta Victoria and gives the start time of the journey as 9:40:30 a.m. |
| Southampton, England | 22 November 1889, 2:30 a.m. | In the itinerary, Bly gives Southampton as the first European arrival; in Chapter II, she describes the Augusta Victoria reaching Southampton in the early morning. |
| London, England | 22 November 1889; left Charing Cross Station at 10:00 a.m. | In Chapter III, Bly describes travelling from Southampton to Waterloo; the itinerary gives her departure from London, Charing Cross, at 10:00 a.m. |
| Folkestone, England | 22 November 1889, late morning or midday | Inferred: In Chapter III, Bly describes changing from the London train to a Channel boat at a pier; this is consistent with the Charing Cross–Folkestone–Boulogne route. |
| Boulogne, France | 22 November 1889 | In Chapter III, Bly states that the Channel boat anchored at Boulogne, where she entered France before continuing by train. |
| Amiens, France | 22 November 1889, evening | In Chapter III, Bly states that she travelled from Boulogne to Amiens and was met there by Jules Verne and his party. |
| Calais, France | Late 22 November / 23 November 1889, 1:30 a.m. departure | In Chapter V, Bly describes reaching Calais after visiting Amiens; the itinerary gives the Brindisi mail train departure from Calais as 1:30 a.m. |
| Paris, France | 23 November 1889 | Inferred: In the itinerary, Bly lists the journey through Paris between Calais and Turin, though the narrative gives no stop in Paris. |
| Modane, France | 23 or 24 November 1889 | Inferred: In Chapter V, Bly describes frontier baggage inspection before entering Italy; the location is printed as “Modena” in the text, but the Calais–Turin railway route passed through Modane at the French-Italian frontier. |
| Turin, Italy | 23 or 24 November 1889 | Inferred: In the itinerary, Bly lists Turin between Paris and Brindisi; the date follows from her departure from Calais and arrival at Brindisi. |
| Brindisi, Italy | 25 November 1889; arrived 1:30 a.m., departed 3:00 a.m. | In the itinerary, Bly gives the arrival at Brindisi and departure aboard the P&O steamer Victoria. |
| Port Said, Egypt | 27 November 1889, 3:30 p.m. | In the itinerary, Bly gives the arrival time at Port Said; in Chapter VII, she describes the ship coaling there. |
| Ismailia, Egypt | 28 November 1889, 11:00 a.m. | In the itinerary, Bly gives the arrival at Ismailia during the passage through the Suez Canal; Chapter VII describes the canal passage. |
| Suez, Egypt | 28 November 1889, 9:00 p.m. | In the itinerary, Bly gives Suez as the evening arrival after the canal passage; Chapter VII describes the approach through the canal and Bay of Suez. |
| Aden | 3 December 1889, 11:00 a.m. | In the itinerary, Bly gives the arrival at Aden; in Chapter VIII, she describes anchoring there and going ashore before leaving for Colombo. |
| Colombo, Ceylon | 8 December 1889, 11:00 a.m. | In the itinerary, Bly gives the arrival at Colombo; in Chapter IX, she describes the delay there before taking the Oriental onward. |
| Kandy, Ceylon | Between 8 and 13 December 1889 | In Chapter IX, Bly describes making a day trip from Colombo to Kandy during the delay before sailing east. |
| Penang | 16 December 1889, 7:00 a.m. | In the itinerary, Bly gives the arrival at Penang; in Chapter X, she describes a short visit ashore before the ship continued. |
| Singapore | 18 December 1889, 5:00 a.m. | In the itinerary, Bly gives the arrival at Singapore; in Chapter X, she describes the ship coaling there before continuing toward Hong Kong. |
| Hong Kong | 23 December 1889, early morning | In Chapter XI, Bly's narrative places the arrival at Hong Kong after the evening of 22 December; inferred: this gives 23 December, though the final table gives 25 December. |
| Canton, China | 25 December 1889 | In Chapter XIII, Bly describes leaving Hong Kong for Canton on Christmas Eve and arriving before daybreak on Christmas Day. |
| Hong Kong | 26 December 1889 | Inferred: In Chapter XIII, Bly describes returning from Canton to Hong Kong after the Christmas Day visit; the date follows from the overnight return after 25 December. |
| Hong Kong | 28 December 1889, 2:30 p.m. departure | In the itinerary, Bly gives the departure from Hong Kong for Yokohama aboard the Oceanic. |
| Yokohama, Japan | 3 January 1890 | Inferred: In the itinerary, Bly gives the Hong Kong–Yokohama leg as 131 hours and 40 minutes after leaving Hong Kong on 28 December, placing arrival around 3 January. |
| Yokohama, Japan | 7 January 1890, 10:55 a.m. departure | In the itinerary, Bly gives the departure from Yokohama aboard an Occidental and Oriental steamship; Chapter XV describes the departure scene from Yokohama. |
| San Francisco, California | 21 January 1890, 8:00 a.m. | In the itinerary, Bly gives the arrival at San Francisco after the Pacific crossing from Yokohama; Chapter XVI describes the final approach after the Pacific voyage. |
| Oakland Mole, California | 21 January 1890 | In Chapter XVII, Bly describes being taken by tug from the Oceanic to Oakland, where the special train was waiting. |
| Merced, California | 21 January 1890 | In Chapter XVII, Bly names Merced as an early stop on the special train eastward from Oakland. |
| Fresno, California | 21 January 1890 | In Chapter XVII, Bly names Fresno as the next major stop after Merced. |
| Needles, California | 21 or 22 January 1890 | Inferred: In the itinerary, Bly lists the Southern Pacific, Atlantic and Pacific, and Atchison, Topeka and Santa Fe route east from California; Needles lay on this route between California and Arizona. |
| La Junta, Colorado | 22 or 23 January 1890 | Inferred: In the itinerary, Bly's stated railway route eastward over the Atchison, Topeka and Santa Fe passed through La Junta before Kansas. |
| Dodge City, Kansas | 22 or 23 January 1890 | In Chapter XVII, Bly names Dodge City among the Kansas stops where crowds met the train. |
| Hutchinson, Kansas | 22 or 23 January 1890 | In Chapter XVII, Bly names Hutchinson among the Kansas stops on the eastward rail journey. |
| Topeka, Kansas | 22 or 23 January 1890 | In Chapter XVII, Bly names Topeka and describes a large crowd greeting the train there. |
| Kansas City area | 22 or 23 January 1890 | In Chapter XVII, Bly states that the train avoided entering Kansas City itself and stopped outside the city limits to save time. |
| Joliet, Illinois | 23 January 1890, early morning | In Chapter XVII, Bly states that members of the Chicago Press Club met her at Joliet before escorting her into Chicago. |
| Chicago, Illinois | 23 January 1890, 7:05 a.m. | In the itinerary, Bly gives the Chicago arrival time; in Chapter XVII, she describes the reception and transfer there. |
| Logansport, Indiana | 23 January 1890 | In Chapter XVII, Bly names Logansport as a dinner stop after leaving Chicago on the Pennsylvania Railway. |
| Columbus, Ohio | 23 January 1890, after dark | In Chapter XVII, Bly names Columbus as an evening stop where a crowd met the train. |
| Pittsburgh, Pennsylvania | Night of 23/24 January 1890 | In Chapter XVII, Bly states that she remained awake until after passing Pittsburgh. |
| Harrisburg, Pennsylvania | 25 January 1890 | In Chapter XVII, Bly names Harrisburg among the final Pennsylvania stops before Philadelphia. |
| Lancaster, Pennsylvania | 25 January 1890 | In Chapter XVII, Bly names Lancaster among the final Pennsylvania stops before Philadelphia. |
| Philadelphia, Pennsylvania | 25 January 1890 | In Chapter XVII, Bly names Philadelphia as the last major city before the final run to Jersey City. |
| Jersey City, New Jersey | 25 January 1890, 3:51 p.m. | In the itinerary, Bly gives the final arrival time as 3:51 p.m.; in Chapter XVII, she states that the journey ended on the Jersey City platform. |

== See also ==
- A Boy Scout Around the World, a 1928 book based on a similar idea.
