= David Blixt =

American dramatist (born 1973)

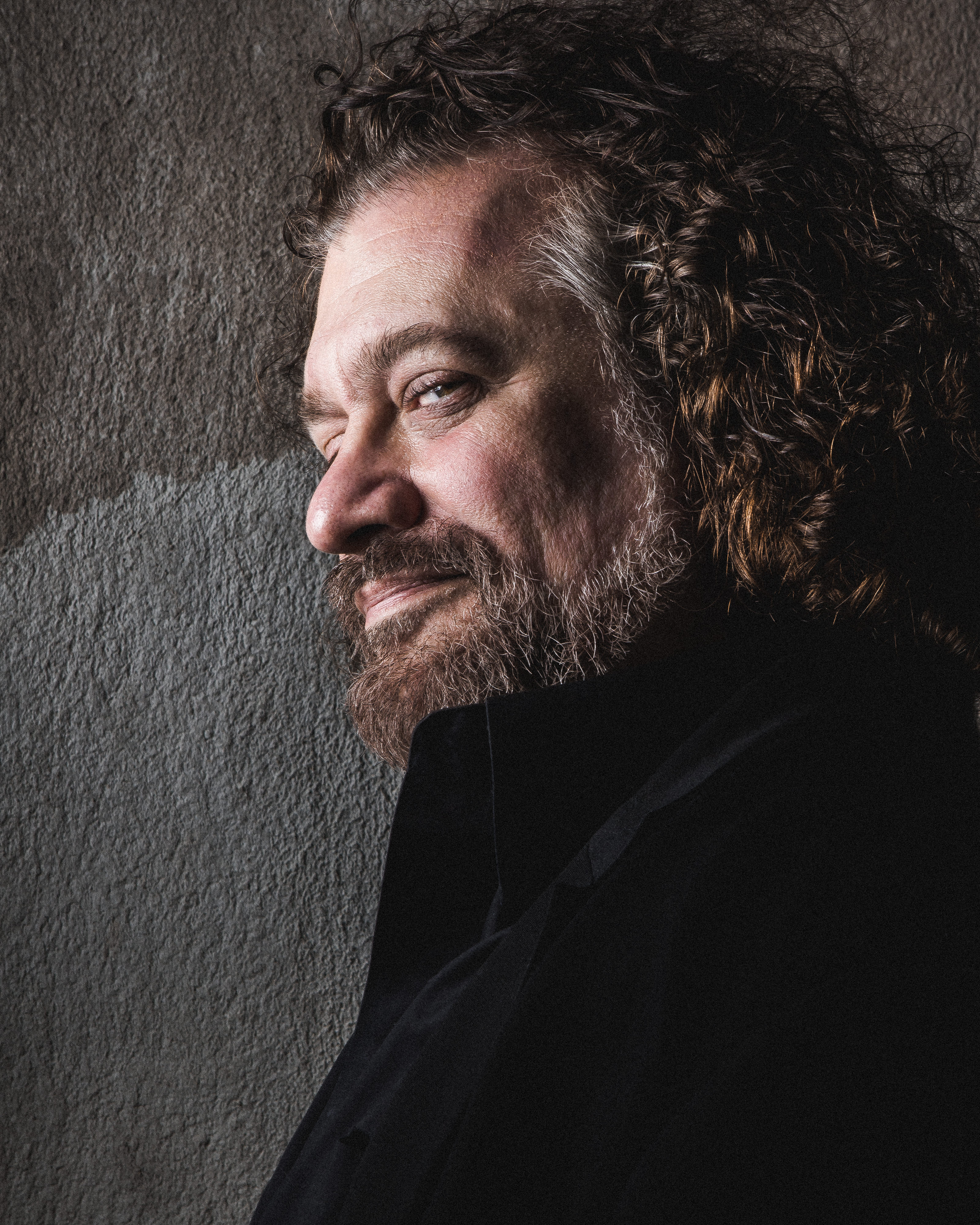
- Born: July 12, 1973 (age 53); Ann Arbor, Michigan, U.S.
- Occupation: Author
- Website: www.davidblixt.com

David Blixt (born July 12, 1973, in Ann Arbor, Michigan) is an American author, stage actor, and director living in Chicago, Illinois. He is the author of more than ten novels of historical fiction, ranging from the Trojan War to the Renaissance, from Ancient Rome to Gilded Age New York. He is best known for writing fiction involving Shakespearean characters, and for his work around journalist Nellie Bly.

Blixt currently serves as an Artistic Associate at the Michigan Shakespeare Festival and is the MSF's resident Fight Director (Violence Designer). He has directed several plays, including a 2004 production of The Complete Works of William Shakespeare (Abridged). Since 2011 he has been on the arts faculty of the Chicago High School for the Arts. In 2012 he and Broadway veteran Rick Sordelet launched their own printing imprint Sordelet Ink, which focuses on publishing playscripts as well as some of Blixt's own works.

An authority on Shakespeare's Romeo & Juliet, in 2014 Blixt and his wife Janice L Blixt were guests of the city of Verona, Italy for the launch of the Italian language edition of his novel The Master Of Verona. He also collaborated on the script for filmmaker Anna Lerario's documentary about the life of Verona's prince, Cangrande della Scala. He was the featured guest for Verona Bookwalk's inaugural Dinner With The Author event in November of 2025.

In 2017 his novel Her Majesty's Will, a comedy in which William Shakespeare and Christopher Marlowe foil a plot on Queen Elizabeth's life, was adapted for the stage by Robert Kauzlaric for Lifeline Theatre.

In 2021 Blixt announced the discovery of eleven lost novels by journalist Nellie Bly, which he subsequently published as The Lost Novels Of Nellie Bly.

Blixt is slated to complete his MFA in Creative Writing from Antioch University in December of 2026, with a dual concentration in Fiction and Screenwriting.

== Awards ==
- Wilde Award for Best Actor-Comedy (2014, won for The Importance of Being Earnest)
- Wilde Award for Best Actor-Comedy (2019, won for Cyrano de Bergerac)
- Joseph Jefferson Award for Fight Choreography (2022, won with Christian Kelly-Sordelet for Athena)
- Joseph Jefferson Award for Fight Choreography (2026, for Superior Donuts)
- Nominated for the Joseph Jefferson Award for Fight Choreography. (2015, for Macbeth at The Artistic Home, 2018 for Her Majesty's Will at Lifeline Theatre, 2023 for Witch at The Artistic Home)

== Bibliography ==
=== The Adventures Of Nellie Bly ===
- What Girls Are Good For: A Novel of Nellie Bly (2018) ISBN 978-1730978425
- Charity Girl: A Nellie Bly Novelette (2020)
- Clever Girl: A Nellie Bly Novella (2020)

=== Star-Cross'd Series ===
1. The Master of Verona (2007)
2. Voice of the Falconer (2010)
3. Fortune's Fool (2012)
4. The Prince's Doom (2014)
5. Varnished Faces: Star-Cross'd Short Stories (2015)

=== Colossus Series ===
1. Stone & Steel (2012)
2. The Four Emperors (2013)
3. Wail of the Fallen (TBA)
4. The Hollow Triumph (TBA)

=== Will & Kit Series ===
1. Her Majesty's Will (2012)

=== Anthologies ===
- A Song Of War: A Novel Of Troy (2023)
- We All Fall Down: Stories Of Plague And Resilience (2020)
- A Sea Of Sorrow: A Novel Of Odysseus (2017)

=== Scripts ===
- Eve of Ides (2012)

=== Non-fiction ===
- Shakespeare's Secrets: Romeo & Juliet (2018)
- Tomorrow & Tomorrow: Essays On Shakespeare's Macbeth (2012, with Janice L Blixt)
- Fighting Words: A Combat Glossary (2016)

=== Editor ===
The Lost Novels Of Nellie Bly

- The Mystery Of Central Park
- Eva The Adventuress
- New York By Night
- Alta Lynn, M.D. (Introduction by Blixt, edited by Robert Kauzlaric)
- Wayne's Faithful Sweetheart (Introduction by Blixt, edited by Robert Kauzlaric)
- Little Luckie, or Playing For Hearts
- In Love With A Stranger, or Through Fire And Water To Win Him
- The Love Of Three Girls
- Little Penny, Child Of The Streets (Introduction by Blixt, edited by Robert Kauzlaric)
- Pretty Merribelle
- Twins & Rivals

Other Nellie Bly Works

- Into The Madhouse: The Complete Reporting Surrounding Nellie Bly's Expose of the Blackwell's Island Insane Asylum (2021)
- Nellie Bly's World Vol 1: 1887–1888 (2021)
- Nellie Bly's World Vol 2: 1889–1890 (2021)
