= The Adventures of Nellie Bly =

1981 American TV drama film

- Genre: Drama
- Written by: Seeleg Lester; S. S. Schweitzer
- Directed by: Henning Schellerup
- Starring: Linda Purl
- Music by: Bob Summers
- Country of origin: United States

Production
- Executive producer: Charles E. Sellier Jr.
- Producer: James L. Conway
- Cinematography: Stephen W. Gray
- Editor: Brent A. Schoenfeld
- Running time: 96 minutes
- Production companies: Schick Sunn Classics; Taft International Pictures

Original release
- Network: NBC
- Release: June 11, 1981

The Adventures of Nellie Bly is a 1981 American made-for-television drama film starring Linda Purl as real-life 19th century journalist Nellie Bly and human rights crusader, depicting a dramatized retelling of her Around The World travels. The film was directed by Henning Schellerup. It was filmed in 1979 and aired on NBC on June 11, 1981. The film was also known as The Amazing Nellie Bly.

== Plot ==
The film begins in 1889, with Nellie Bly an established celebrity and investigative journalist focused on exposing corruption and mistreatment in New York. Inspired by Jules Verne's Around the World in Eighty Days, she decides to attempt such a trip as her next assignment. Despite doubts from her editor and the public that a woman could undertake such a trip, she sets forth. The film follows her travels, using every mode oftransportation available available, and ending with her successful return to New York in a little of 72 days, making it a new record.

== Cast ==
- Linda Purl - Nellie Bly
- Gene Barry - John Cockerill
- Ray Buktenica - Kenny Thompson
- J. D. Cannon - Boss James J. Palmer
- John Randolph - Joseph Pulitzer
- Paul Sylvan - Johnny Neesen
- Cliff Osmond - Stanfil
- Betsy Slade - Rose Woods
- Elayne Heilveil - Angela Harris
- Fran Ryan - Mrs. Roman
- Milton Selzer - Dr. Woodville
- Peg Stewart - Mrs. Long
- Betty Barry - Grace Palmer
- Michael Ruud - Horrigan
- Katherine Klekas - Miss Levy

== Production ==
Parts of the film were shot in Salt Lake City and Park City, Utah.
