= Robert Seaman =

American businessman (1822–1904)

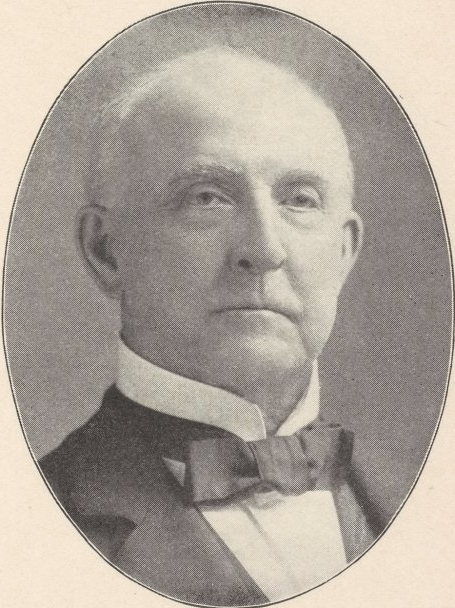
- Born: 1822; Catskill, New York, U.S.
- Died: March 11, 1904 (aged 81–82); U.S.
- Occupation: Industrialist
- Spouse: Nellie Bly (m. 1895)

Robert Livingston Seaman (1822 – March 11, 1904) was an American industrialist who was the husband of investigative journalist Elizabeth Jane Cochran (better known as Nellie Bly).

Born in Catskill, Greene County, New York to William and Ellen Seaman, Robert made his fortune in the wholesale grocery business and in 1869 started the Ironclad Manufacturing Company, manufacturing cans for shipping milk on trains, riveted boilers, tanks, and “The Most Durable Enameled Kitchen Ware Made.”

== Marriage to Elizabeth Cochran ==
In March 1895, Seaman met journalist Elizabeth Jane Cochran, better known by her pen name Nellie Bly, at a dinner party, or on a train, and on April 5, 1895, married her. An article announcing their marriage called him one of the most carefully dressed men in New York. Seaman's loved ones were suspicious, sure that she had married him for his money. One magazine even wondered if it was an example of her "stunt reporting" in which Bly would pretend to be married and then write about it. After their marriage, they resided in his home on West 37th Street in New York City. In 1896, they traveled to Europe, returning to New York in 1899 to take care of problems with his business.

== Death ==
On February 6, 1904, Seaman was struck by a horse and wagon while crossing a street and on March 11, 1904, he died of heart disease brought on by his injuries.

Seaman's business prospered during his lifetime and for a number of years after his death under his wife's management. At the 1901 Pan-American Exposition, Iron Clad factories were promoted as being, "Owned exclusively by Nellie Bly – the only woman in the world personally managing industries of such a magnitude." After his death in 1904, his wife became the energetic and innovative president of his Iron Clad Manufacturing Company. Later, however, embezzlement on the part of employees destroyed the company. At its peak, Iron Clad employed 1,500 and could produce 1,000 steel barrels daily, but then charges of fraud led to bitterly contested bankruptcy proceedings, beginning in 1911. The Iron Clad Manufacturing Company eventually succumbed to debt, and Bly returned to newspaper reporting, covering women's suffrage events and Europe's Eastern Front during the war. Bly died in 1922.

== Sources ==
Remarkable Nellie Bly's Oil Drum, Oil and Natural Gas History, Education Resources, Museum News, Exhibits and Events, Bylines: A Photobiography of Nellie Bly, National Geographic books, page 50, 51
