= Elizabeth Bisland =

American writer and journalist

Elizabeth Bisland Wetmore
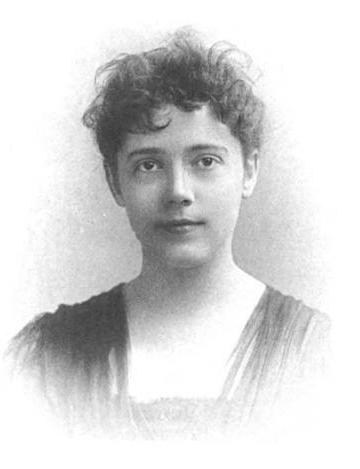
- Elizabeth Bisland circa 1891
- Born: Elizabeth Bisland; February 11, 1861; St. Mary Parish, Louisiana
- Died: January 6, 1929 (aged 67); Charlottesville, Virginia
- Occupation: Writer
- Spouse: Charles B. Wetmore (October 6, 1854 – June 1, 1919)
- Parent(s): Thomas Shields Bisland (1837–1908) and Margaret (Brownson) Bisland (m. June 24, 1858)

Elizabeth Bisland Wetmore (February 11, 1861 – January 6, 1929) was an American journalist and author, perhaps now best known for her 1889–1890 race around the world against Nellie Bly, which drew worldwide attention. The majority of her writings were literary works. She published all of her works as Elizabeth Bisland.

== Early career ==
Bisland was born on Fairfax Plantation, St. Mary Parish, Louisiana, on February 11, 1861. During the Civil War, the family fled the homestead prior to the Battle of Fort Bisland. Life was difficult when they returned, and when she was twelve the family moved to Natchez, Louisiana, site of her father's family home that he had inherited.

She began her writing career as a teenager, sending poetry to the New Orleans Times Democrat using the pen name B. L. R. Dane. Once her writing activity was revealed to her family and the editor of the paper, she was paid for the work, and she soon went to New Orleans to work for the paper.

Around 1887, Bisland moved to New York City and got her first work from The Sun newspaper. By 1889 she was doing work for a number of publications, including the New York World. Among other outlets, she later became an editor at Cosmopolitan magazine and she also contributed to the Atlantic Monthly and the North American Review.

== Journey around the world ==
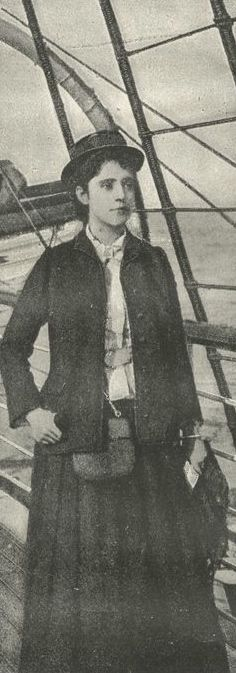
Elizabeth Bisland on a ship's deck during her around-the-world race against Nellie Bly

In November 1889, the New York World announced that it was sending its reporter Nellie Bly around the world, in a bid to beat Phileas Fogg's fictitious 80-day journey in Jules Verne's novel Around the World in Eighty Days. Catching wind of this publicity stunt, John Brisben Walker, who had just purchased the three-year-old and still-fledgling Cosmopolitan, decided to dispatch Bisland on her own journey.

Ultimately, however, Bly triumphed over Bisland. Critically, while in England, Bisland was told (and apparently believed) she had missed her intended ride, the swift German steamer Ems leaving from Southampton, even though her publisher had bribed the shipping company to delay its departure. It is unknown whether she was intentionally deceived. She was thus forced to catch the slow-going Bothnia on January 18, departing from Queenstown (now Cobh), Ireland, ensuring that Bly would prevail.

Bisland's ship did not arrive in Manhattan until January 30. She completed her trip in 76 1/2 days, well ahead of Fogg's fictional record but slower than Bly's 72 days. Bisland wrote a series of articles for the Cosmopolitan on her journey, subsequently published as a book entitled, In Seven Stages: A Flying Trip Around The World (1891).

== Later career ==
Bisland's writing was of a more literary nature than her participation in the world race might indicate (and her writings were a clear contrast from the more swashbuckling style of Bly's writings on her trip). Indeed, her 1929 New York Times obituary failed to even mention the journey, and she focused her writing on more serious topics after "the race". In 1906, she published the well-received The Life and Letters of Lafcadio Hearn; she had first met Hearn when both were living in New Orleans in the 1880s.

She co-wrote with Anne Hoyt Seekers in Sicily, which was written before, but published after, the 1908 Messina earthquake.

Bisland's final book, Three Wise Men of the East (1930), was published posthumously.

== Personal life ==
Bisland married lawyer Charles Whitman Wetmore in 1891, however, she continued to publish books under her maiden name. The couple constructed a noted summer residence called Applegarth (on Long Island's North Shore) in 1892.

Bisland died of pneumonia near Charlottesville, Virginia on January 6, 1929, and was buried at Woodlawn Cemetery in The Bronx, New York City, coincidentally, in the same cemetery as Bly, who also died of pneumonia in 1922.

== Selected bibliography ==
- In Seven Stages: A Flying Trip Around the World. Harper and Brothers. 1891.
- A Candle of Understanding (1903)
- The Secret Life: Being the Book of a Heretic (1906)
- The Life and Letters of Lafcadio Hearn (1906)
- Three Wise Men of the East (1930)

== In popular culture ==
Although Bisland is far less remembered than Bly, the race between the two has been the subject of two works of popular history and one musical theatre production:

- Goodman, Matthew (October 2013). "Elizabeth Bisland's Race Around the World". Public Domain Review.
- Marks, Jason. Around the World in 72 Days: The race between Pulitzer's Nellie Bly and Cosmopolitan's Elizabeth Bisland (Gemittarius Press 1993) (ISBN 978-0-9633696-2-8)
- DiFabbio, Marialena and Jones, Susannah. Bisland and Bly. Sycamore Theatre Company, 2018.
