= SS Bothnia (1874) =

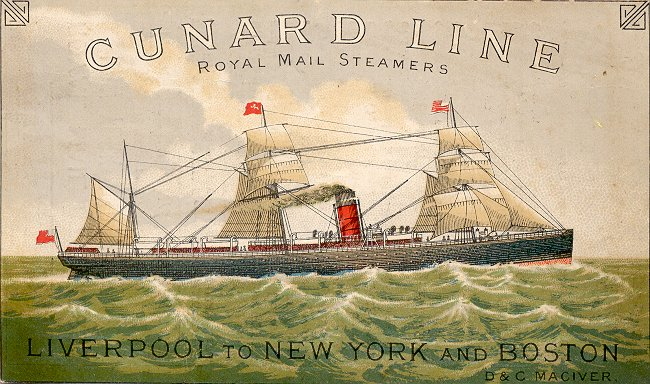
- Poster image of SS Bothnia

History

United Kingdom
- Name: SS Bothnia
- Namesake: Gulf of Bothnia
- Owner: Cunard Line
- Port of registry: Liverpool
- Builder: J. & G. Thomson & Co., Clydebank
- Yard number: 128
- Launched: 4 March 1874
- Completed: June 1874
- Maiden voyage: 8 August 1874
- Identification: Official number: 68094; Code letters: MVKQ
- Fate: Scrapped, 1899

General characteristics
- Type: Steamship
- Tonnage: 4,535 GRT; 2,923 NRT
- Length: 422 ft 2 in (128.68 m)
- Beam: 42 ft 2 in (12.85 m)
- Depth: 18 ft 11 in (5.77 m)
- Propulsion: 1 × 600 hp (447 kW) steam compound steam engine
- Sail plan: Barque-rigged
- Speed: 12.5 knots (23.2 km/h; 14.4 mph)
- Capacity: 1,400 passengers: 300 × 1st class; 1,100 × 3rd class

SS Bothnia was a British steam passenger ship that sailed on the trans-Atlantic route between Liverpool and New York City or Boston. The ship was built by J & G Thomson of Clydebank, and launched on 4 March 1874 for the British & North American Royal Mail Steam Packet Company, which became the Cunard Line in 1879.

Constructed with an iron hull ship, and 4,535 gross register tons, and with a length of 422 feet. She was powered by a 600 hp 2-cylinder compound steam engine, barque-rigged on three masts, and had a top speed of 12 1/2 knots. She could carry up to 1,400 passengers, 300 in first class and 1,100 in 3rd class.

Bothnia sailed on her maiden voyage from Liverpool to New York via Queenstown on 8 August 1874, and on 15 April 1885, made her first voyage from Liverpool to Boston. She was withdrawn from service in mid-1898 and then sold, and was scrapped in Marseille in 1899.
