= Nellie Bly =

American investigative journalist (1864–1922)

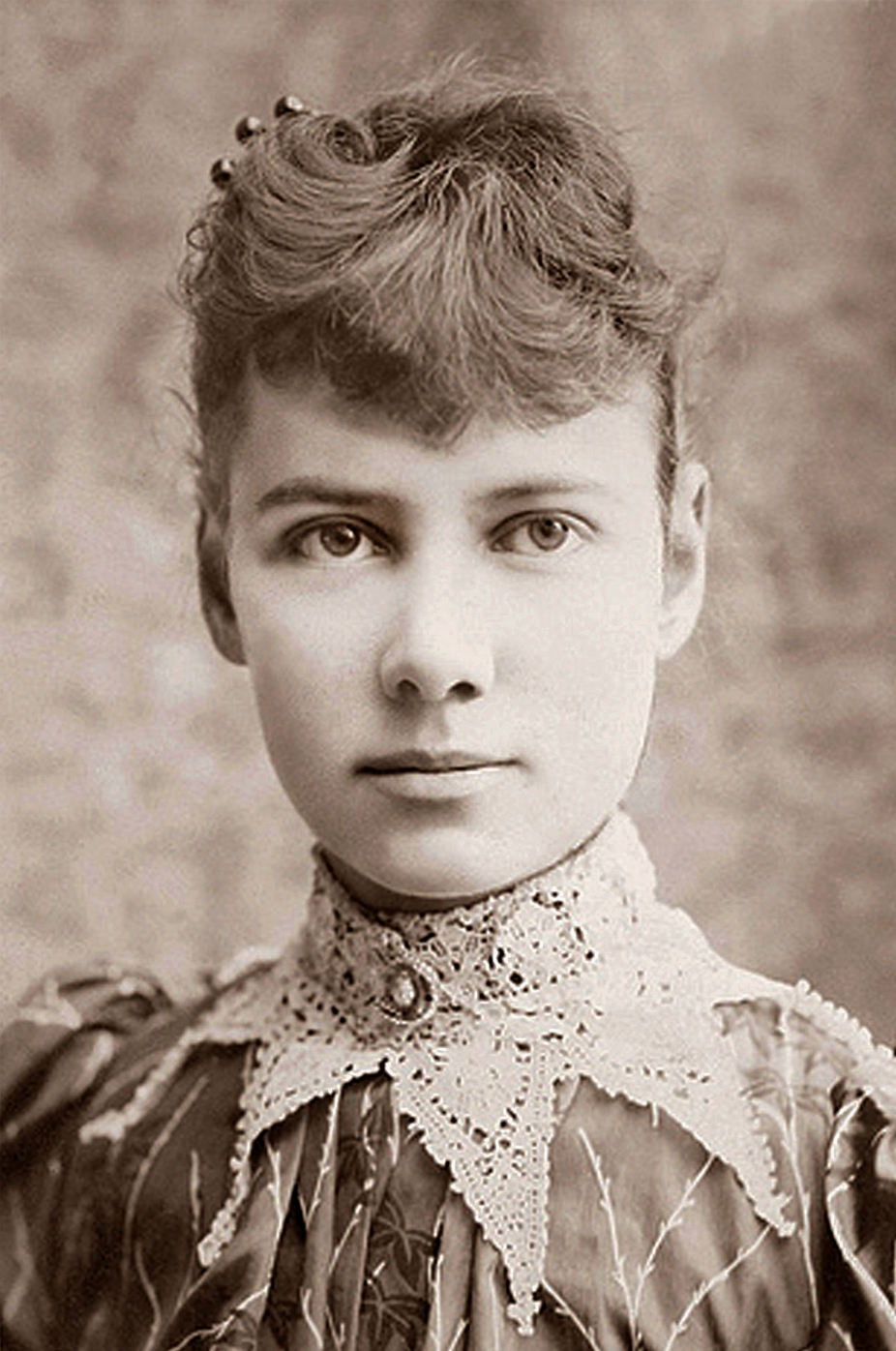
- Cochran c. 1890
- Born: Elizabeth Jane Cochran; May 5, 1864; Burrell Township, Pennsylvania, U.S.
- Died: January 27, 1922 (aged 57); New York City, U.S.
- Occupations: Journalist; writer; inventor
- Spouse: Robert Seaman (m. 1895; died 1904)
- Writing career
- Pen name: Elly Cochran, Elizabeth Jane Cochrane, Elizabeth Cochrane Seaman, and most commonly known by her pen-name Nellie Bly
- Language: English
- Notable awards: National Women's Hall of Fame (1998)

Elizabeth Cochrane Seaman (born Elizabeth Jane Cochran; May 5, 1864 – January 27, 1922), better known by her pen name Nellie Bly, was an American journalist who was widely known for her record-breaking trip around the world in 72 days in emulation of Jules Verne's fictional character Phileas Fogg, and for an exposé in which she worked undercover to report on a mental institution from within. She ushered in the era of stunt girl reporting and helped advance a new kind of immersion journalism.

== Early life ==
Elizabeth Jane Cochran was born May 5, 1864, in Cochran's Mills, now part of Burrell Township, Armstrong County, Pennsylvania. Her father, Michael Cochran, born about 1810, started as a laborer and mill worker before buying the local mill and most of the land surrounding his family farmhouse. He later became a merchant, postmaster, and associate justice at Cochran's Mills (named after him) in Pennsylvania. Cochran married twice. He had 10 children with his first wife, Catherine Murphy, and five more children, including Elizabeth, his thirteenth daughter, with his second wife, Mary Jane Kennedy. He died in 1870, when Elizabeth was 6.

As a young girl, Elizabeth often was called "Pink" because she so frequently wore that color. As a teenager, she wanted to portray herself as more sophisticated, so she dropped the nickname and changed her surname to Cochrane. In 1879, she enrolled at Indiana Normal School (now Indiana University of Pennsylvania) for one term but was forced to drop out due to lack of funds. In 1880, Cochrane's mother moved her family to Allegheny City, which was later annexed by the City of Pittsburgh.

== Career ==
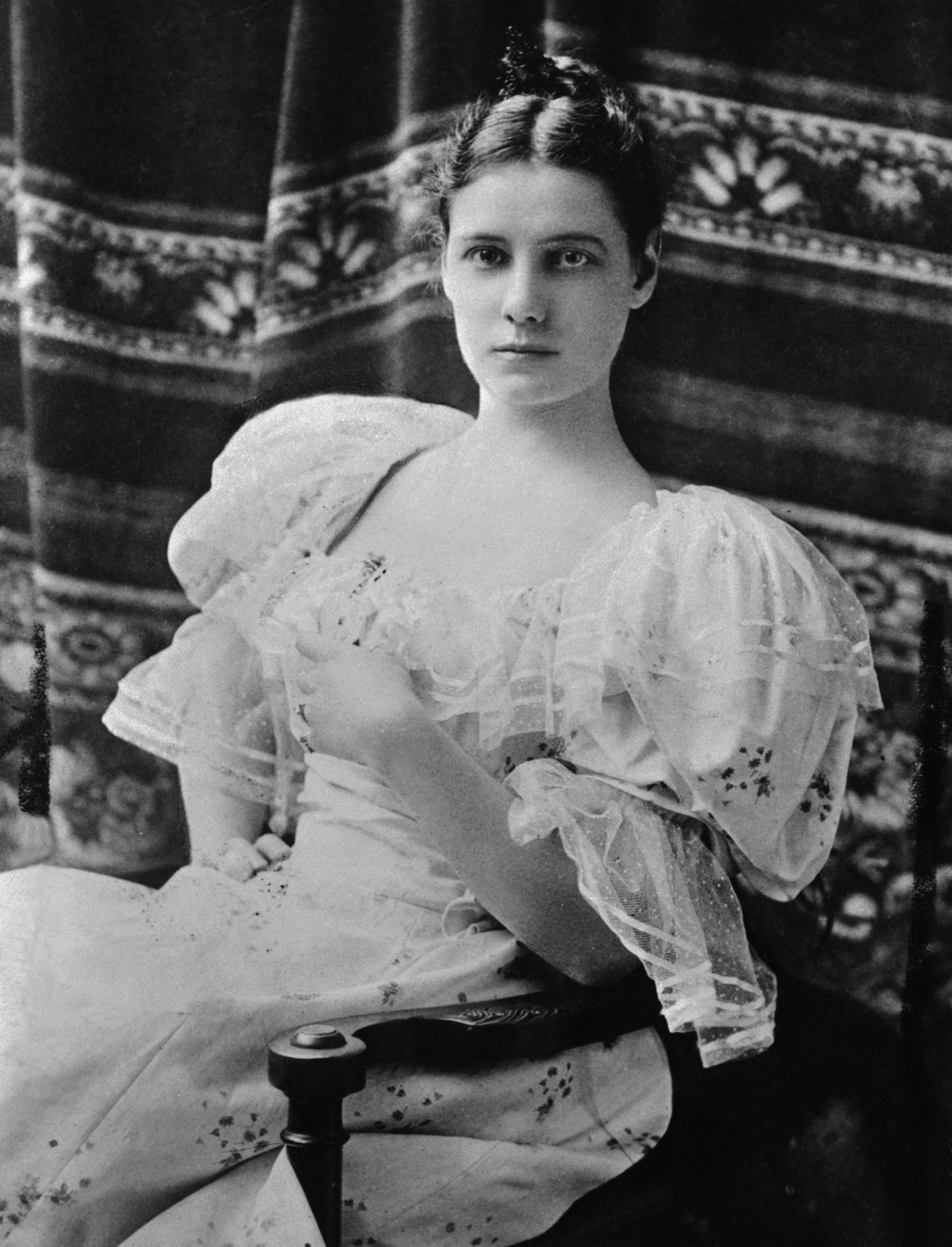
Portrait of a 21-year-old Bly in Mexico

=== Pittsburgh Dispatch ===
In 1885, a column in the Pittsburgh Dispatch titled "What Girls Are Good For" stated that girls were principally for birthing children and keeping house. This prompted Elizabeth to write a response under the pseudonym "Lonely Orphan Girl". The editor, George Madden, was impressed with her passion and ran an advertisement asking the author to identify herself. When Cochran introduced herself to the editor, he offered her the opportunity to write a piece for the newspaper, again under the pseudonym "Lonely Orphan Girl". Her first article for the Dispatch, titled "The Girl Puzzle", argued that not all women would marry and that what was needed were better jobs for women.

Her second article, "Mad Marriages", was about how divorce affected women. In it, she argued for reform of divorce laws. "Mad Marriages" was published under the byline of Nellie Bly, rather than "Lonely Orphan Girl" because, at the time, it was customary for female journalists to use pen names to conceal their gender so that readers would not discredit them. Cochrane chose "Nelly Bly", after the African-American title character in the popular song "Nelly Bly" by Stephen Foster. However, her editor wrote "Nellie" by mistake, and the error stuck. Madden was impressed again and offered her a full-time job.

As a writer, Nellie Bly focused her early work for the Pittsburgh Dispatch on the lives of working women, writing a series of investigative articles on female factory workers. Bly went undercover as a poor woman to get hired at a copper cable factory for a firsthand view of the poor working conditions that women and children faced in the typical factory setting. Her columns were applauded by factory workers for highlighting the hidden truth. However, the newspaper soon received complaints from factory owners about her writing, and she was reassigned to women's pages to cover fashion, society, and gardening, the usual role for female journalists, and she became dissatisfied. Still only 21, she was determined "to do something no girl has done before." She then traveled to Mexico to serve as a foreign correspondent, spending nearly half a year reporting on the lives and customs of the Mexican people. Her dispatches later were published in book form as Six Months in Mexico. In one report, she protested the imprisonment of a local journalist for criticizing the Mexican government, then a dictatorship under Porfirio Díaz. When Mexican authorities learned of Bly's report, they threatened her with arrest, prompting her to flee the country. Safely home, she accused Díaz of being a tyrannical czar suppressing the Mexican people and controlling the press.

=== Asylum exposé ===
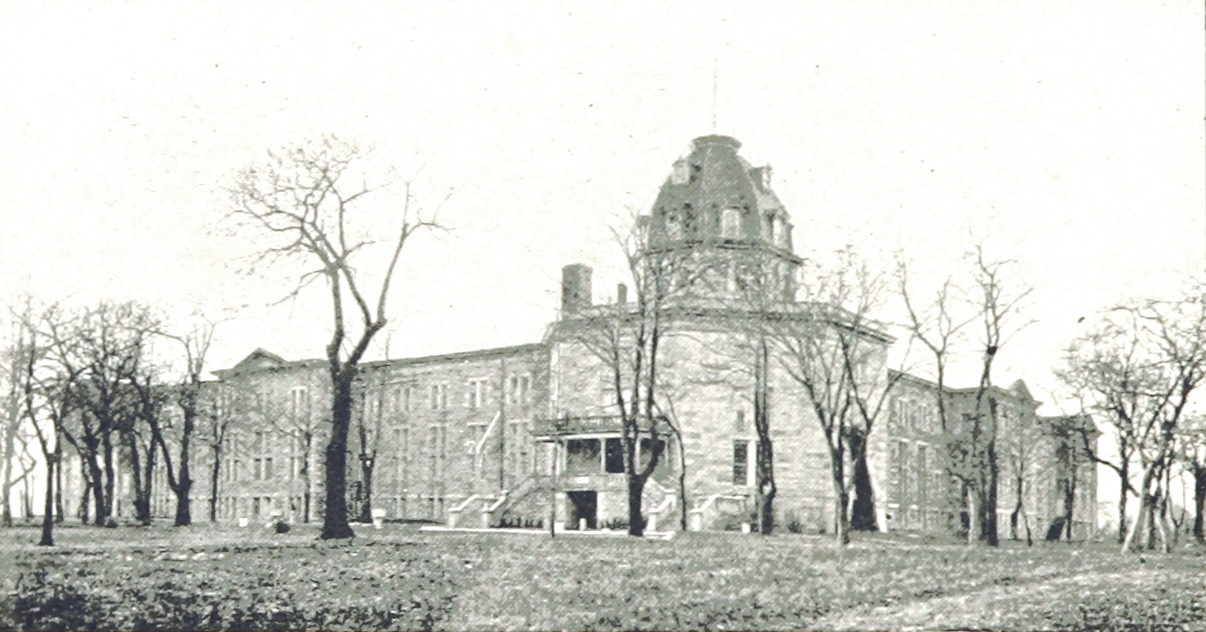
The New York City Mental Health Hospital on Blackwell's Island, c. 1893

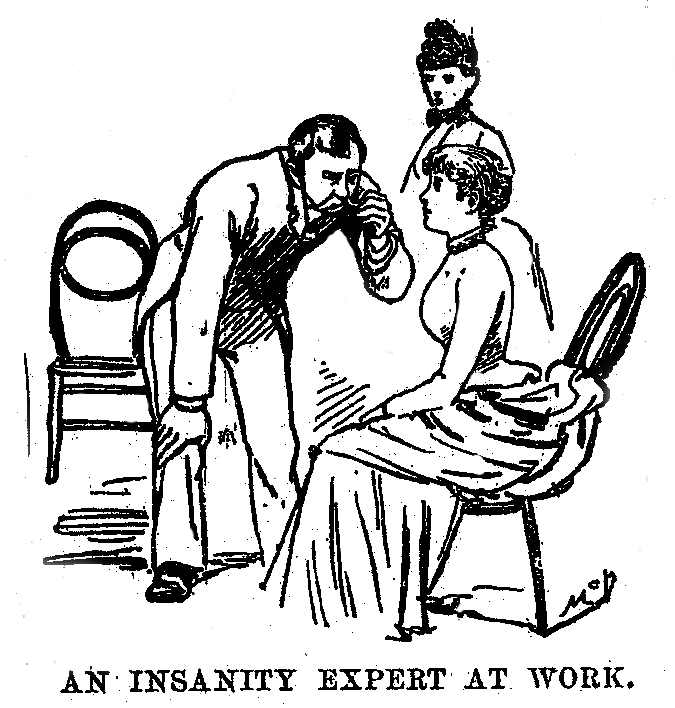
Illustration of Bly being examined by a psychiatrist, from Ten Days in a Mad-House

Burdened again with theater and arts reporting, Bly left the Pittsburgh Dispatch in 1887 for New York City. Bly faced rejection after rejection as news editors would not consider hiring a woman. Penniless after four months, she talked her way into the offices of Joseph Pulitzer's newspaper, the New York World, and took an undercover assignment for which she agreed to feign insanity to investigate reports of brutality and neglect at the Women's Lunatic Asylum on Blackwell's Island, now named Roosevelt Island.

It was not easy for her to be admitted to the asylum; she first decided to check herself into a boarding house called "Temporary Homes for Females". She stayed up all night to give herself the wide-eyed look of a disturbed woman and began making accusations that the other boarders were insane. Bly told the assistant matron: "There are so many crazy people about, and one can never tell what they will do." She refused to go to bed and eventually scared so many of the other boarders that the police were called to take her to the nearby courthouse. Once examined by a police officer, a judge, and a doctor, Bly was taken to Bellevue Hospital for a few days, then after evaluation was sent by boat to Blackwell's Island.

Committed to the asylum, Bly experienced the deplorable conditions firsthand. After a few days committed to the asylum, Bly dropped her feigned "madness" and, despite her lucid state and claimed sanity, underwent the same treatments as other inpatients in extremely cold, hostile conditions. She got to know other patients, noting the particular mistreatment of poor or immigrant patients with limited English language skills. After several days of lucidity and multiple denied requests to be discharged, an attorney from The World intervened. After ten days, the asylum released Bly at The World's behest. Her report, published October 9, 1887 and later in book form as Ten Days in a Mad-House, caused a sensation, prompted the asylum to implement reforms, and brought her lasting fame. Just twenty-three years old, Nellie Bly had a significant impact on American culture and shed light on the experiences of marginalized women beyond the bounds of the asylum as she ushered in the era of stunt girl journalism.

In 1893, Bly used the celebrity status she had gained from her asylum reporting skills to schedule an exclusive interview with the allegedly insane serial killer Lizzie Halliday.

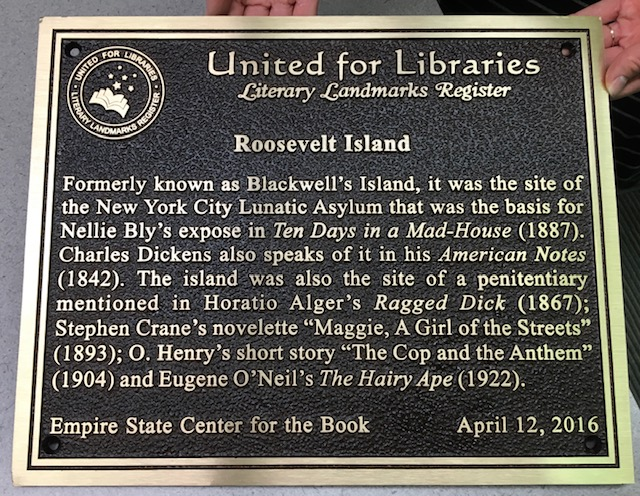
United for Libraries Literary Landmark on Roosevelt Island (formerly Blackwell's Island) that mentions Bly's connection to the island

Biographer Brooke Kroeger argues:

Her two-part series in October 1887 was a sensation, effectively launching the decade of "stunt" or "detective" reporting, a clear precursor to investigative journalism and one of Joseph Pulitzer's innovations that helped give "New Journalism" of the 1880s and 1890s its moniker. The employment of "stunt girls" has often been dismissed as a circulation-boosting gimmick of the sensationalist press. However, the genre also provided women with their first collective opportunity to demonstrate that, as a class, they had the skills necessary for the highest level of general reporting. The stunt girls, with Bly as their prototype, were the first women to enter the journalistic mainstream in the twentieth century.

=== Around the world and general impact ===
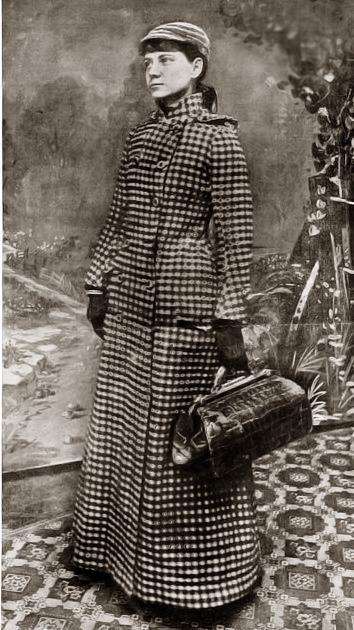
A publicity photograph taken by the New York World newspaper to promote Bly's around-the-world voyage

In 1888, Bly suggested to her editor at the New York World that she take a trip around the world, attempting to turn the fictional Around the World in Eighty Days (1873) into fact for the first time. The editor expressed doubts she could do it, reasoning that she only spoke English, that as a woman she would pack too much to travel successfully, and that she would have to be escorted by a man. A year later, at 9:40 a.m. on November 14, 1889, with only two days notice given to her editor, she boarded the Augusta Victoria, a steamer of the Hamburg America Line, and began her 24,898 mile (40,070 kilometer) journey.

To sustain interest in the story, the World organized a "Nellie Bly Guessing Match" in which readers were asked to estimate Bly's arrival time to the second, with the Grand Prize consisting at first of a trip to Europe and, later on, spending money for the trip. During her travels around the world, Bly went through England, France (where she met Jules Verne in Amiens), Brindisi, the Suez Canal, Colombo (in Ceylon), the Straits Settlements of Penang and Singapore, Hong Kong, and Japan.

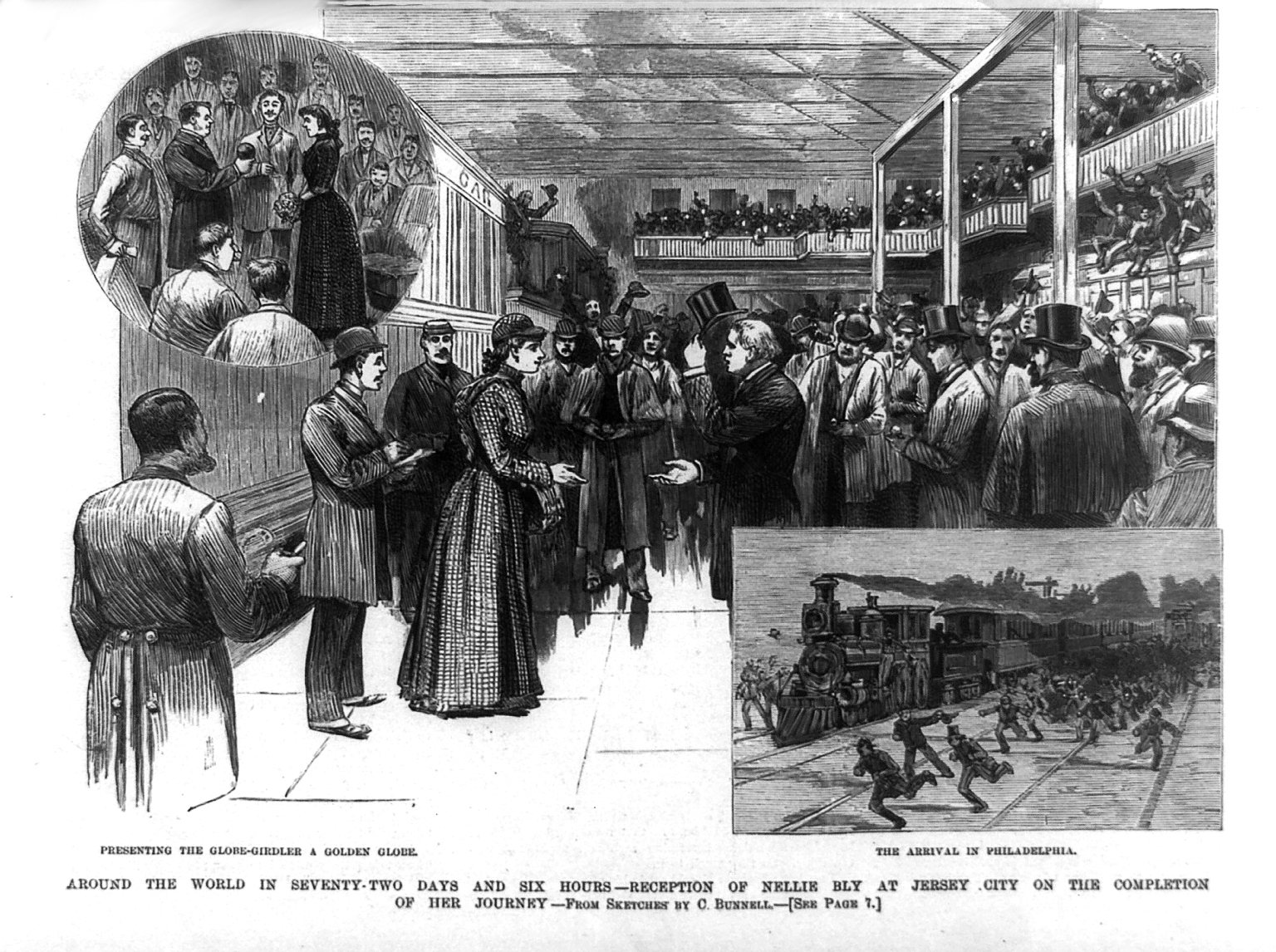
A woodcut image of Nellie Bly's homecoming reception in Jersey City printed in Frank Leslie's Illustrated News on February 8, 1890

Just over seventy-two days after her initial departure, Bly arrived in New York on January 25, 1890, completing her circumnavigation of the globe. She had traveled alone for almost the entire journey. Bly was not the only woman attempting to circumnavigate for newspaper sensation: Elizabeth Bisland Wetmore was attempting the journey in the opposite direction, for the Cosmopolitan. Bly's journey was a world record, though it only stood for a few months, until George Francis Train lowered it to 67 days.

Prior to setting forth on her round the world challenge in 1889, Bly wrote an article for the World on learning to ride a bicycle.

=== Novelist ===
After the fanfare of her trip around the world, Bly quit reporting and took a lucrative job writing serial novels for publisher Norman Munro's weekly New York Family Story Paper. The first chapters of Eva The Adventuress, based on the real-life trial of Eva Hamilton, appeared in print before Bly returned to New York. Between 1889 and 1895 she wrote eleven novels. As few copies of the paper survived, these novels were thought lost until 2021, when author David Blixt announced the discovery of 11 lost novels in Munro's British weekly The London Story Paper. In 1893, though still writing novels, she returned to reporting for the World.

=== Later work ===
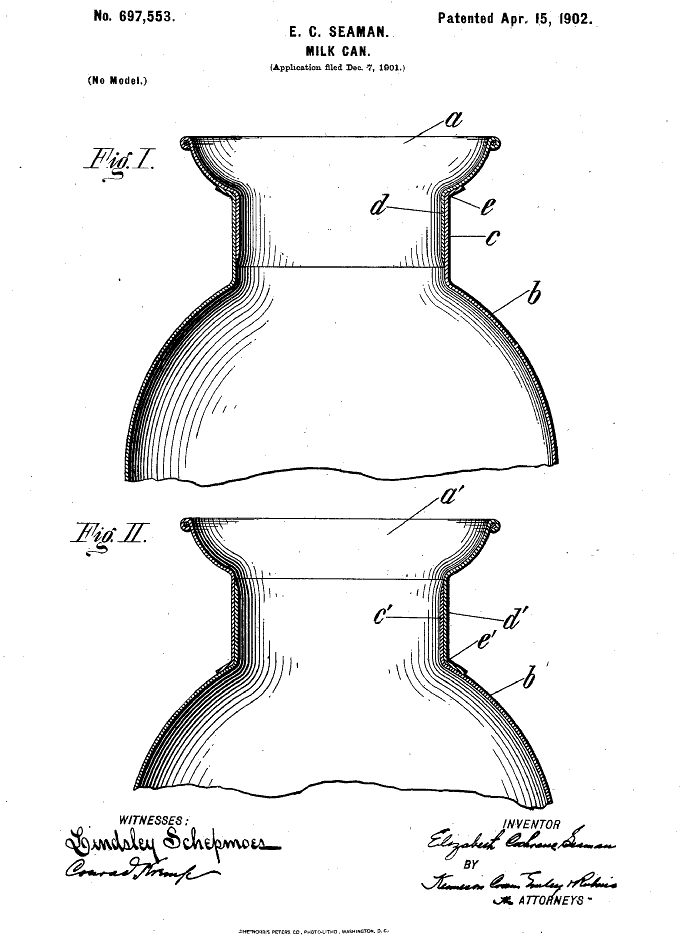
Patent for an improved milk can

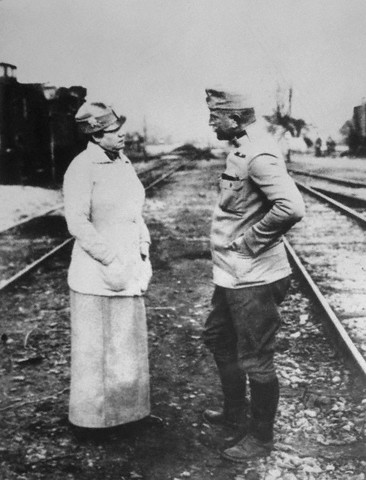
Bly speaking to a military officer in Poland during World War I c. 1914

In 1895, Bly married millionaire manufacturer Robert Seaman. Bly was 31 and Seaman was 73. Due to her husband's failing health, she left journalism and succeeded her husband as head of the Iron Clad Manufacturing Co., which made steel containers such as milk cans and boilers. Seaman died in 1904.

That same year, Iron Clad began manufacturing the steel barrel that was the model for the 55-gallon oil drum still in widespread use in the United States. There have been claims that Bly was responsible for the design, but the inventor was registered as Henry Wehrhahn (U.S. Patents 808,327 and 808,413).

Bly was also an inventor in her own right, receiving U.S. patent 697,553 for a novel milk can and U.S. patent 703,711 for a stacking garbage can, both under her married name of Elizabeth Cochrane Seaman. For a time, she was one of the leading women industrialists in the United States. But her ignorance of record keeping and accounting enabled embezzlement by a factory manager, which resulted in the Iron Clad Manufacturing Co. going bankrupt.

According to biographer Brooke Kroeger:

She ran her company as a model of social welfare, replete with health benefits and recreational facilities. But Bly was hopeless at understanding the financial aspects of her business and ultimately lost everything. Unscrupulous employees bilked the firm of hundreds of thousands of dollars, troubles compounded by protracted and costly bankruptcy litigation.

Back in reporting, she covered the Woman Suffrage Procession of 1913 for the New York Evening Journal. Her article's headline was "Suffragists Are Men's Superiors", and in its text she accurately predicted that women in the United States would be given the right to vote in 1920.

Bly wrote stories on Europe's Eastern Front during World War I. Bly was the first woman and one of the first foreigners to visit the war zone between Serbia and Austria. She was arrested when she was mistaken for a British spy.

== Death ==
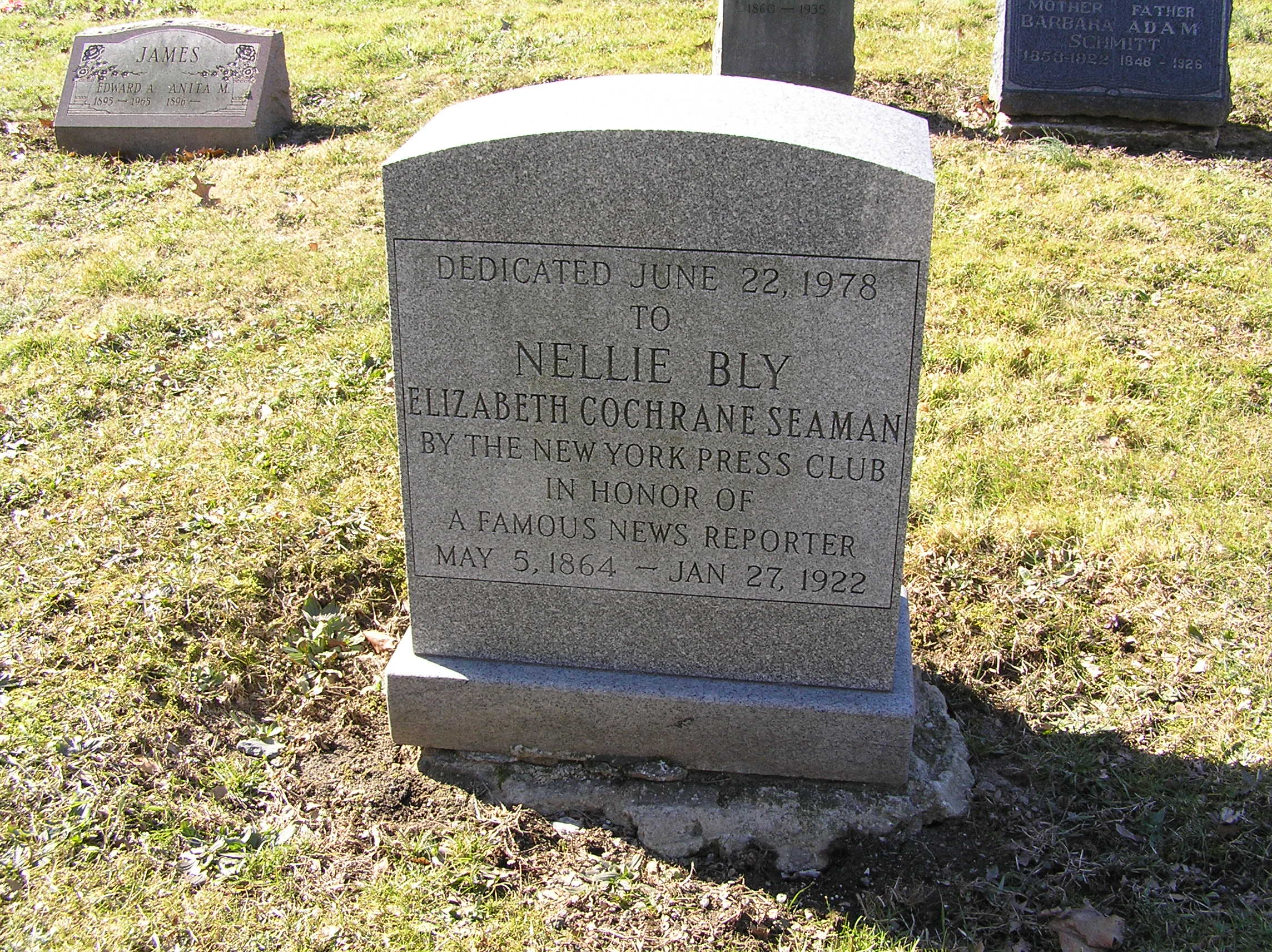
Bly's grave in Woodlawn Cemetery

Bly died of pneumonia on January 27, 1922, at St. Mark's Hospital, New York City, aged 57. She was interred at Woodlawn Cemetery in The Bronx, New York City.

== Legacy ==
=== Honors ===
In 1998, Bly was inducted into the National Women's Hall of Fame.

Bly was one of four journalists honored with a US postage stamp in a "Women in Journalism" set in 2002.

In 2019, the Roosevelt Island Operating Corporation put out an open call for artists to create a Nellie Bly Memorial art installation on Roosevelt Island. The winning proposal, The Girl Puzzle by Amanda Matthews, was announced on October 16, 2019. The Girl Puzzle opened to the public in December 2021.

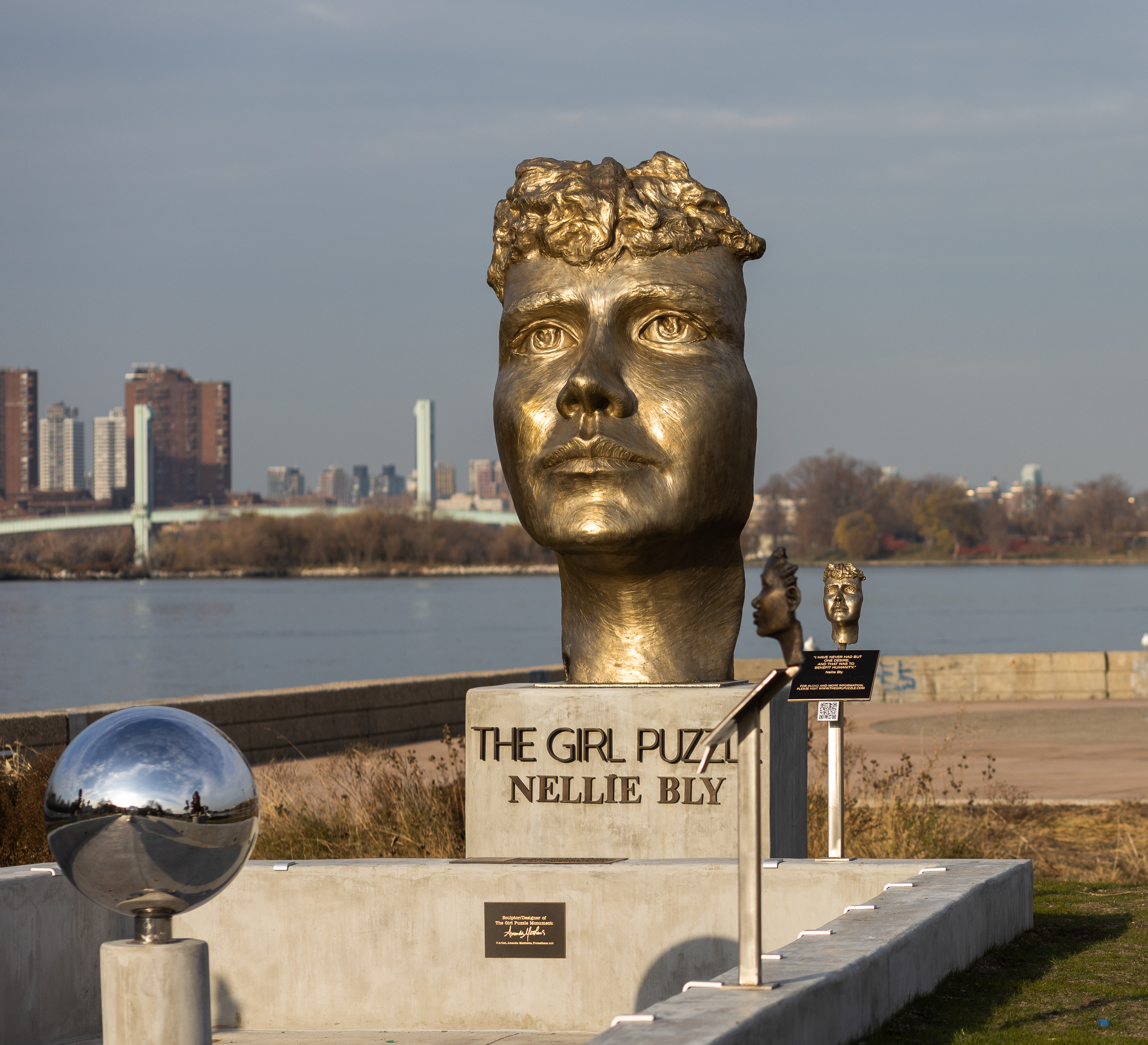
Nellie Bly depicted as part of The Girl Puzzle Monument Honoring Nellie Bly, by artist Amanda Matthews, located in Lighthouse Park on Roosevelt Island in New York City

The New York Press Club confers an annual Nellie Bly Cub Reporter journalism award to acknowledge the best journalistic effort by an individual with three years or fewer of professional experience. In 2020, it was awarded to Claudia Irizarry Aponte, of THE CITY.

Since 2017, the Museum of Political Corruption annually has honored journalists with the Nellie Bly award for investigative reporting.

=== Theater ===
Bly was the subject of the 1946 Broadway musical Nellie Bly by Johnny Burke and Jimmy Van Heusen. The show ran for just 16 performances.

During the 1990s, playwright Lynn Schrichte wrote and toured Did You Lie, Nellie Bly?, a one-woman show about Bly.

An opera based on 10 Days in a Madhouse premiered in Philadelphia, Pennsylvania, in September 2023. The music was by Rene Orth and the libretto by Hannah Moscovitch.

=== Film and television ===
Bly has been portrayed in the films The Adventures of Nellie Bly (1981), 10 Days in a Madhouse (2015), and Escaping the Madhouse: The Nellie Bly Story (2019). In 2019, the Center for Investigative Reporting released Nellie Bly Makes the News, a short animated biographical film. A fictionalized version of Bly as a mouse named Nellie Brie appears as a central character in the animated children's film An American Tail: The Mystery of the Night Monster. The character of Lana Winters (Sarah Paulson) in American Horror Story: Asylum is inspired by Bly's experience in the asylum. Bly was a subject of Season 2 Episode 5 of The West Wing in which First Lady Abbey Bartlet dedicates a memorial in Pennsylvania in honor of Nellie Bly and convinces the president to mention her and other female historic figures during his weekly radio address. On May 5, 2015, the Google search engine produced an interactive "Google Doodle" for Bly; for the "Google Doodle" Karen O wrote, composed, and recorded an original song about Bly, and Katy Wu created an animation set to Karen O's music.

=== Audio drama ===
Nellie's story was adapted into a Doctor Who audio drama by Big Finish Productions, released on September 8, 2021. The Perils of Nellie Bly was the second story in a three-story box set, and was written by Sarah Ward.

=== Literature ===
Bly has been featured as the protagonist of novels by David Blixt, Marshall Goldberg, Dan Jorgensen, Carol McCleary, Pearry Reginald Teo, Maya Rodale, Christine Converse and Louisa Treger. David Blixt also appeared on a March 10, 2021, episode of the podcast Broads You Should Know as a Nellie Bly expert.

A fictionalized account of Bly's around-the-world trip was used in the 2010 comic book Julie Walker Is The Phantom published by Moonstone Books (Story: Elizabeth Massie, art: Paul Daly, colors: Stephen Downer).

Bly is one of 100 women featured in the first version of the book Good Night Stories for Rebel Girls written by Elena Favilli & Francesca Cavallo.

=== Eponyms and namesakes ===
The board game Round the World with Nellie Bly created in 1890 is named in recognition of her trip.

The Nellie Bly Amusement Park in Brooklyn, New York City, was named after her, taking as its theme Around the World in Eighty Days. The park reopened in 2007 under new management, renamed "Adventurers Amusement Park".

A large species of tarantula from Ecuador, Pamphobeteus nellieblyae Sherwood et al., 2022, was named in her honour by arachnologists.

A fireboat named Nellie Bly operated in Toronto, Canada, in the first decade of the 20th century. From early in the twentieth century until 1961, the Pennsylvania Railroad operated an express train named the Nellie Bly on a route between New York and Atlantic City, bypassing Philadelphia.

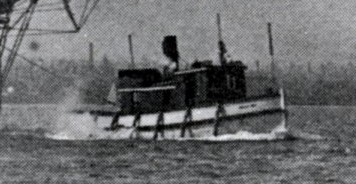
A steam tug named after Bly served as a fireboat in Toronto, Ontario, Canada.

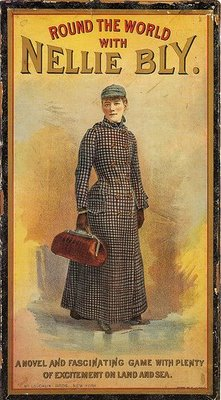
Cover of the 1890 board game Round the World with Nellie Bly

== Works ==
Within her lifetime, Nellie Bly published three non-fiction books (compilations of her newspaper reportage) and one novel in book form.

- Bly, Nellie (1887). Ten Days in a Mad-House. New York: Ian L. Munro.
- Bly, Nellie (1888). Six Months in Mexico. New York: American Publishers Corporation.
- Bly, Nellie (1889). The Mystery of Central Park. New York: G. W. Dillingham.
- Bly, Nellie (1890). Nellie Bly's Book: Around the World in Seventy-two Days. New York: The Pictorial Weeklies Company.

Between 1889 and 1895, Nellie Bly also penned twelve novels for The New York Family Story Paper. Thought lost, these novels were not collected in book form until their re-discovery in 2021.

- Eva The Adventuress (1889)
- New York By Night (1890)
- Alta Lynn, M.D. (1891)
- Wayne's Faithful Sweetheart (1891)
- Little Luckie, or Playing For Hearts (1892)
- Dolly The Coquette (1892)
- In Love With A Stranger, or Through Fire And Water To Win Him (1893)
- The Love Of Three Girls (1893)
- Little Penny, Child Of The Streets (1893)
- Pretty Merribelle (1894)
- Twins & Rivals (1895)

== See also ==
- Eleanor Riese, a psychiatric patient who sued over non-consensual administration of anti-psychotic medicine
- Elizabeth Bisland, who raced Nellie around the globe for a competing publisher
- Frances Farmer, actress who was involuntarily committed to mental hospitals
- List of American print journalists
- List of female explorers and travelers
- Nellie Bly Cub Reporter Award
- Women in journalism
