= Kim Todd =

American author (born 1970)

- Born: April 15, 1970 (age 56)

Academic background
- Education: University of Montana

Academic work
- Discipline: Creative writing
- Institutions: University of Minnesota; University of Montana

Kim Todd (born April 15, 1970) is an American author. She is also a professor of creative writing at the University of Minnesota. She has written essays and several books of nonfiction, primarily about environmental history and the natural sciences.

== Education and work ==
Todd received her master's in environmental studies and her M.F.A. in creative writing from the University of Montana.

Todd is the recipient of a PEN/Jerard Fund award. Her book Tinkering with Eden won the 2001 Sigurd Olson Nature Writing Award. Her book Chrysalis was selected by the New York Public Library as a "Book to Remember." Her work has been reviewed in The New Yorker, The New York Times, and The New York Review of Books.

== Bibliography ==
=== Books ===
- Tinkering with Eden, A Natural History of Exotic Species in America (2001) ISBN 978-0393048605.
- Chrysalis, Maria Sibylla Merian and the Secrets of Metamorphosis (2007) (See Maria Sibylla Merian.)
- Sparrow (2012) Reaktion Books. ISBN 978-1861898753.
- Sensational: The Hidden History of America's 'Girl Stunt Reporters', HarperCollins, New York, 2021. ISBN 9780062843616

=== Essays and articles ===
- "Curious." River Teeth (2014)
- "Road Warrior." River Teeth (2015)
- "Reintroductions and Other Translocations." Guernica (2015)
- "Real predators don’t eat popsicles." High Country News (2016)
- "The Language of Sparrows: How Bird Songs Are Evolving To Compete With Urban Noise." Bay Nature (2016)
- "These Women Reporters Went Undercover to Get the Most Important Scoops of Their Day." Smithsonian (2016)
- "The Children’s Hour, Theatre Rhinoceros, 1986." Guernica (2017)
- "The Island Wolves." Orion (2017)
- "Coyote Tracker: San Francisco's Uneasy Embrace of a Predator's Return." Bay Nature (2018)
- "In Turn Each Woman Thrust Her Head." Paris Review Daily (2018)
